= 2002 Turkish Cup final =

- Event: 2001–02 Turkish Cup
Kocaelispor	Beşiktaş
4	0
- Date: April 3, 2002
- Venue: Bursa Atatürk Stadium, Bursa
- Referee: Metin Tokat (Turkey)

The 2002 Turkish Cup final was a football match played on 3 April 2002 at the Bursa Atatürk Stadium in Bursa. It was the final and deciding match of the 2001–02 Turkish Cup.

== Match details ==
3 April 2002
20:00 CEST

Kocaelispor	4 – 0	Beşiktaş
Cihan 44'; Lazarov 59'; Dąbrowski 82'; Serdar 83'	(Report)

Bursa Atatürk Stadium, Bursa
Attendance: 22,000
Referee: Metin Tokat (Turkey)

Kocaelispor	Beşiktaş

Kocaelispor:
GK	77	(Turkey) Ahmet Şahin
DF	18	(Turkey) Cihan Haspolatlı
DF	2	(Turkey) Faruk Sarman
DF	8	(Turkey) Orhan Ak		(substituted off) 28'
DF	5	(Turkey) Nuri Çolak
MF	13	(Turkey) Ahmet Arslaner
MF	15	(Egypt) Ayman Abdel-Aziz	(yellow card) 46'
MF	10	(Bulgaria) Aleksandar Aleksandrov		(substituted off) 70'
MF	33	(Turkey) Cem Sinan Vergül
FW	7	(Poland) Roman Dąbrowski
FW	11	(Bulgaria) Zdravko Lazarov		(substituted off) 62'
Substitutes:
GK	1	(Turkey) Metin Mert
DF	3	(Turkey) Engin Öztonga		(substituted on) 28'
DF	6	(Turkey) Hasan Yiğit
MF	9	(Turkey) Kwame Ayew		(substituted on) 70'
MF	17	(Turkey) Ömer Aysan Barış
FW	21	(Turkey) Bülent Kaan Bilgen
FW	41	(Turkey) Serdar Topraktepe		(substituted on) 62'
Manager:
(Turkey) Hikmet Karaman

Beşiktaş:
GK	1	(Norway) Thomas Myhre
DF	18	(Turkey) Erman Güraçar
DF	4	(Turkey) Ahmet Yıldırım
DF	5	(Brazil) Ronaldo Guiaro
DF	19	(Turkey) İbrahim Üzülmez
MF	3	(Turkey) Tayfur Havutçu	(yellow card) 22'
MF	7	(Tunisia) Zoubeir Baya
MF	17	(Turkey) Tamer Tuna		(substituted off) 78'
MF	20	(Turkey) Tümer Metin		(substituted off) 88'
FW	10	(Turkey) Ahmet Dursun
FW	26	(Turkey) İlhan Mansız
Substitutes:
GK	33	(Sweden) Mattias Asper
DF	14	(Turkey) Ümit Bozkurt		(substituted on) 88'
DF	16	(Russia) Dmitri Khlestov
DF	25	(Turkey) Ali Eren Beşerler
MF	11	(Turkey) Bayram Bektaş
FW	9	(Norway) Arild Stavrum
FW	15	(Turkey) Sertan Eser		(substituted on) 78'
Manager:
(Germany) Christoph Daum
