= 1996–97 Galatasaray S.K. season =

Galatasaray
1996–97 season
- President: (Turkey) Faruk Süren
- Head coach: (Turkey) Fatih Terim
- Stadium: Ali Sami Yen Stadı
- 1. Lig: 1st
- Türkiye Kupası: Sixth round
- UEFA Cup Winners' Cup: Second round
- 1996 Süper Kupa: Winners
- 1997 Süper Kupa: Winners
- Top goalscorer: League: Hakan Şükür (38); All: Hakan Şükür (46)
- Highest home attendance: 38,518 vs Ç. Dardanel (1. Lig, 22 September 1996)
- Lowest home attendance: 18,037 vs Denizlispor (1. Lig, 4 October 1996)
- Average home league attendance: 26,362
Home colours	Away colours	Third colours

The 1996–97 season was Galatasaray's 93rd in existence and the 39th consecutive season in the 1. Lig. This article shows statistics of the club's players in the season, and also lists all matches that the club have played in the season.

== Board of directors ==
- Faruk Süren
- Atilla Donat
- Ates Ünal Erzen
- Ozhan Canaydin
- Ergun Gursoy
- Ali Durust
- Celal Gurcan
- Ahmet Yolalan
- Ahmet Ozdogan
- Ali Ogutucu
- Mahmut
- Irfan Kurtoglu

== Squad statistics ==
No.	Pos.	Name	1. Lig		Türkiye Kupası		Cup Winners' Cup		Süper Kupa		Total	
No.	Pos.	Name	Apps	Goals	Apps	Goals	Apps	Goals	Apps	Goals	Apps	Goals
-	GK	(Turkey) Hayrettin Demirbaş	11	0	1	0	4	0	0	0	16	0
-	GK	(Turkey) Volkan Kilimci	14	0	0	0	0	0	2	0	16	0
-	GK	(Turkey) Pierre Esser	1	0	0	0	0	0	0	0	1	0
-	GK	(Turkey) Mehmet Duymazer	8	0	0	0	0	0	0	0	8	0
-	DF	(Turkey) Bekir Gür	19	1	1	0	3	0	0	0	23	1
-	DF	(Romania) Iulian Filipescu	23	0	1	0	0	0	2	0	26	0
-	DF	(Turkey) Feti Okuroğlu	13	0	0	0	2	0	2	0	17	0
3	DF	(Turkey) Bülent Korkmaz	32	2	1	0	4	0	2	0	39	2
-	DF	(Turkey) Mert Korkmaz	4	0	0	0	2	0	0	0	6	0
-	DF	(Netherlands) Ulrich Van Gobbel	9	0	0	0	2	0	0	0	11	0
-	DF	(Turkey) Ufuk Talay	1	0	0	0	0	0	0	0	1	0
-	DF	(Turkey) Vedat İnceefe	29	2	1	0	4	0	2	0	36	2
11	DF	(Turkey) Hakan Ünsal	29	2	1	1	4	1	2	0	36	4
-	MF	(Turkey) Ergün Penbe	29	2	1	0	3	0	2	0	35	2
-	MF	(Turkey) Okan Buruk	17	3	1	0	3	0	1	0	22	3
-	MF	(Turkey) Evren Turhan	9	1	0	0	2	0	0	0	11	1
-	MF	(Turkey) İlyas Kahraman	10	0	1	0	0	0	2	0	13	0
-	MF	(Turkey) Tugay Kerimoğlu (C)	33	4	1	0	3	1	1	0	38	5
-	MF	(Turkey) Suat Kaya	25	2	0	1	0	0	2	0	28	2
-	MF	(Turkey) Emre Belözoğlu	1	0	0	0	0	0	0	0	1	0
-	MF	(Turkey) Ümit Davala	28	3	1	0	4	0	1	1	34	4
10	MF	(Romania) Gheorghe Hagi	30	14	1	0	3	1	2	0	36	15
6	FW	(Turkey) Arif Erdem	31	8	0	0	4	1	1	0	36	9
-	FW	(Turkey) Alp Küçükvardar	1	0	0	0	1	0	0	0	2	0
-	FW	(Romania) Adrian Ilie	18	6	0	0	0	0	1	0	19	6
-	FW	(Switzerland) Adrian Knup	9	1	1	3	1	0	0	0	13	2
9	FW	(Turkey) Hakan Şükür	32	38	1	0	4	4	2	4	39	46

=== Players in / out ===
==== In ====
Pos.	Nat.	Name	Age	Moving from
MF	(Romania)	Gheorghe Hagi	31	FC Barcelona
DF	(Romania)	Iulian Filipescu	22	FC Steaua București
MF	(Turkey)	Ümit Davala	23	Istanbulspor
DF	(Turkey)	Vedat İnceefe	22	Kardemir Karabükspor
FW	(Switzerland)	Adrian Knup	28	Karlsruher SC
FW	(Romania)	Adrian Ilie	22	FC Steaua București
GK	(Turkey)	Volkan Kilimci	24	Kocaelispor
GK	(Turkey)	Pierre Esser	26	Fortuna Düsseldorf

==== Out ====
Pos.	Nat.	Name	Age	Moving to
FW	(Turkey)	Uğur Tütüneker	33	career end
FW	(Wales)	Dean Saunders	32	Nottingham Forest FC
GK	(Turkey)	Nezih Ali Boloğlu	32	Bakırköy SK
DF	(Zimbabwe)	Norman Mapeza	24	Altay SK
GK	(United States)	Brad Friedel	25	Columbus Crew
DF	(Turkey)	Sedat Balkanlı	31	Fenerbahçe SK
GK	(Lithuania)	Gintaras Staučė	27	Sarıyer G.K.
DF	(Turkey)	Cihat Arslan	26	Zeytinburnu SK
MF	(Turkey)	Ceyhun Eriş	19	Çaykur Rizespor
FW	(Switzerland)	Adrian Knup	28	FC Basel
DF	(Netherlands)	Ulrich van Gobbel	25	Southampton FC
FW	(Turkey)	Saffet Sancaklı	29	Kocaelispor
MF	(Turkey)	Yusuf Tepekule	28	Vanspor on loan
MF	(Turkey)	Ufuk Talay	20	Antalyaspor on loan
GK	(Turkey)	Hayrettin Demirbaş	33	Zeytinburnu SK on loan

== 1. Lig ==
=== Standings ===
Pos	Team	Pld	W	D	L	GF	GA	GD	Pts	Qualification or relegation
1	Galatasaray (C)	34	25	7	2	90	30	+60	82	Qualification to Champions League second qualifying round
2	Beşiktaş	34	22	8	4	88	26	+62	74	Qualification to Champions League second qualifying round
3	Fenerbahçe	34	22	7	5	79	25	+54	73	Qualification to UEFA Cup first round
4	Trabzonspor	34	22	6	6	73	33	+40	72	Qualification to UEFA Cup second qualifying round
5	Bursaspor	34	17	8	9	55	37	+18	59	

Rules for classification: 1) points; 2) goal difference; 3) number of goals scored.
(C) Champions

=== Matches ===
10 August 1996 1	Vanspor	1–2	Galatasaray SK	Van
16:00 EET	Atnan Baytar 56'	(Report)	Gheorghe Hagi 43', 80'	Stadium: Atatürk Stadı; Referee: Ünsal Çimen

17 August 1996 2	Galatasaray SK	1–0	Trabzonspor	Istanbul
19:00 EET	Gheorghe Hagi 19'	(Report)		Stadium: Ali Sami Yen Stadı; Attendance: 27,333; Referee: Metin Tokat

23 August 1996 3	Kocaelispor	1–1	Galatasaray SK	İzmit
19:00 EET	Tayfur Havutçu 24'	Report	Ümit Davala 63'	Stadium: İsmet Paşa Stadium; Referee: İlhami Kaplan

8 September 1996 4	Galatasaray SK	0–4	Fenerbahçe SK	Istanbul
19:00 EET		Report	Saffet Sancaklı 10'; Jay-Jay Okocha 23'; Elvir Bolić 27', 78'	Stadium: Ali Sami Yen Stadı; Attendance: 27,542; Referee: Muhittin Boşat

15 September 1996 5	Sarıyer G.K.	0–4	Galatasaray SK	Istanbul
19:00 EET		(Report)	Tugay Kerimoğlu 35'; Hakan Şükür 43'; Arif Erdem 56', 65'	Stadium: İnönü Stadium; Referee: Sabri Çelik

22 September 1996 6	Galatasaray SK	1–0	Çanakkale Dardanelspor	İzmir
19:00 EET	Gheorghe Hagi 3'	(Report)		Stadium: İzmir Atatürk Stadium; Attendance: 38,518; Referee: Oğuz Sarvan

29 September 1996 7	Gençlerbirliği SK	0–2	Galatasaray SK	Ankara
19:00 EET		Report	Hakan Şükür 40'; Evren Nuri Turhan 84'	Stadium: Ankara 19 Mayıs Stadium; Referee: Ayhan Yücebilgiç

4 October 1996 8	Galatasaray SK	2–0	Denizlispor	Istanbul
19:00 EET	Hakan Şükür 70', 88'	Report		Stadium: Ali Sami Yen Stadı; Attendance: 18,037; Referee: Yılnur Önen

13 October 1996 9	Samsunspor	0–2	Galatasaray SK	Samsun
15:00 EET		Report	Hakan Ünsal 44'; Gheorghe Hagi 72'	Stadium: Samsun 19 Mayıs Stadium; Referee: Alican Lakot

20 October 1996 10	Galatasaray SK	6–1	Gaziantepspor	Istanbul
19:00 EET	Hakan Şükür 15', 30' (pen.), 82', 90'; Gheorghe Hagi 32' (pen.); Ümit Davala 72'	Report	Fernand Coulibaly 69'	Stadium: Ali Sami Yen Stadı; Attendance: 27,987; Referee: Selçuk Şahin

27 October 1996 11	Altay SK	1–8	Galatasaray SK	İzmir
19:00 EET	Edema Fuludu 89'	Report	Hakan Şükür 6', 23' (pen.); Ümit Davala 8'; Gheorghe Hagi 11'; Arif Erdem 13', 65', 72'; Okan Buruk 43'	Stadium: İzmir Atatürk Stadium; Attendance: 36,662; Referee: Metin Tokat

3 November 1996 12	Galatasaray SK	6–1	Istanbulspor	Istanbul
19:00 EET	Tugay Kerimoğlu 19', 87'; Vedat İnceefe 22'; Hakan Şükür 72' (pen.), 83'; Okan Buruk 79'	Report	Saffet Akyüz 26'	Stadium: Ali Sami Yen Stadı; Attendance: 26,982; Referee: Muhittin Boşat

15 November 1996 13	Galatasaray SK	2–2	Beşiktaş JK	Istanbul
19:00 EET	Hakan Şükür 32', 41'	Report	Ertuğrul Sağlam 23', 56' (pen.)	Stadium: Ali Sami Yen Stadı; Attendance: 30,000; Referee: Metin Tokat

22 November 1996 14	Zeytinburnuspor	2–5	Galatasaray SK	Istanbul
19:00 EET	Mustafa Kocabey 4'; Ali Çakır 20'	(Report)	Bekir Gür 12'; Ergün Penbe 14'; Adrian Knup 35'; Hakan Ünsal 40'; Hakan Şükür 64'	Stadium: İnönü Stadium; Attendance: 12,365; Referee: Mustafa Kalkandelen

1 December 1996 15	Galatasaray SK	3–1	Antalyaspor	Istanbul
19:00 EET	Hakan Şükür 10' (pen.), 36' (pen.); Gheorghe Hagi 48'	Report	Nuri Kamburoğlu 38' (pen.)	Stadium: Ali Sami Yen Stadı; Attendance: 25,997; Referee: Ayhan Yücebilgiç

6 December 1996 16	MKE Ankaragücü	0–1	Galatasaray SK	Ankara
19:00 EET		Report	Suat Kaya 53'	Stadium: Ankara 19 Mayıs Stadium; Attendance: 15,858; Referee: İbrahim Aksoy

21 December 1996 17	Galatasaray SK	4–1	Bursaspor	Istanbul
19:00 EET	Hakan Şükür 7', 56', 74'; Adrian Ilie 26'	Report	Elvir Baljić 42' (pen.)	Stadium: Ali Sami Yen Stadı; Attendance: 22,627; Referee: Mustafa Çulcu

17 January 1997 18	Galatasaray SK	1–1	Vanspor	Istanbul
20:00 EET	Gheorghe Hagi 57'	Report	Yusuf Tepekule 90'	Stadium: Ali Sami Yen Stadı; Attendance: 20,364; Referee: Murat Ilgaz

25 January 1997 19	Trabzonspor	0–0	Galatasaray SK	Trabzon
19:00 EET		Report		Stadium: Hüseyin Avni Aker Stadium; Referee: Ayhan Yücebilgiç

2 February 1997 20	Galatasaray SK	0–0	Kocaelispor	Istanbul
19:00 EET		Report		Stadium: Ali Sami Yen Stadı; Attendance: 24,399; Referee: Oğuz Sarvan

9 February 1997 21	Fenerbahçe SK	3–2	Galatasaray SK	Istanbul
19:00 EET	Jay Jay Okocha 15'; Elvir Bolić 53' (pen.), 76'	Report	Vedat İnceefe 19'; Arif Erdem 88'	Stadium: Şükrü Saracoğlu Stadium; Attendance: 25,680; Referee: Mustafa Çulcu

15 February 1997 22	Galatasaray SK	4–0	Sarıyer G.K.	Istanbul
19:00 EET	Okan Buruk 2'; Hakan Şükür 39', 55' (pen.); Adrian Ilie 49'	Report		Stadium: Ali Sami Yen Stadı; Attendance: 25,023; Referee: Orhan Erdemir

23 February 1997 23	Çanakkale Dardanelspor	0–3	Galatasaray SK	Çanakkale
13:30 EET		(Report)	Adrian Ilie 15'; Gheorghe Hagi 67'; Hakan Şükür 76'	Stadium: 18 Mart Stadı; Referee: İbrahim Aksoy

2 March 1997 24	Galatasaray SK	1–1	Gençlerbirliği SK	Istanbul
19:00 EET	Ümit Özat 9' (o.g.)	Report	Ümit Karan 85'	Stadium: Ali Sami Yen Stadı; Attendance: 28,243; Referee: İlhami Kaplan

7 March 1997 25	Denizlispor	2–3	Galatasaray SK	Denizli
20:00 EET	Hasan Çelik 40'; İlker Daşbulak 60'	(Report)	Bülent Korkmaz 26'; Hakan Şükür 43' (pen.); Suat Kaya 68'	Stadium: Atatürk Stadı; Referee: Mustafa Çulcu

15 March 1997 26	Galatasaray SK	3–1	Samsunspor	Istanbul
19:00 EET	Hakan Şükür 18', 63' (pen.), 72' (pen.)	Report	Daniel Timofte 79' (pen.)	Stadium: Ali Sami Yen Stadı; Attendance: 24,048; Referee: Ayhan Yücebilgiç

22 March 1997 27	Gaziantepspor	0–3	Galatasaray SK	Gaziantep
19:00 EET		Report	Ergün Penbe 10'; Bülent Korkmaz 42'; Arif Erdem 87'	Stadium: Kamil Ocak Stadium; Referee: Metin Tokat

6 April 1997 28	Galatasaray SK	2–1	Altay S.K.	Istanbul
15:00 EET	Adrian Ilie 5'; Hakan Şükür 17'	Report	Serdar Meriç 75'	Stadium: Ali Sami Yen Stadı; Attendance: 27,643; Referee: Kadir Tozlu

12 April 1997 29	Istanbulspor	2–3	Galatasaray SK	Istanbul
19:00 EET	Engin Özdemir 70'; Aykut Kocaman 74'	(Report)	Tugay Kerimoğlu 42'; Gheorghe Hagi 52', 90' (pen.)	Stadium: İnönü Stadium; Attendance: 26,982; Referee: Vahap Beyaz

20 April 1997 30	Beşiktaş JK	1–1	Galatasaray SK	Istanbul
19:00 EET	Daniel Amokachi 32'	Report	Gheorghe Hagi 86' (pen.)	Stadium: İnönü Stadium; Attendance: 33,200; Referee: Ahmet Çakar

4 May 1997 31	Galatasaray SK	4–0	Zeytinburnuspor	Istanbul
19:00 EET	Adrian Ilie 69'; Hakan Şükür 71' (pen.), 82', 87'	Report		Stadium: Ali Sami Yen Stadı; Attendance: 23,548; Referee: Sabri Çelik

10 May 1997 32	Antalyaspor	0–2	Galatasaray SK	Antalya
19:00 EET		(Report)	Hakan Şükür 24'; Gheorghe Hagi 88'	Stadium: Atatürk Stadı; Referee: Mustafa Çulcu

17 May 1997 33	Galatasaray SK	5–1	MKE Ankaragücü	Istanbul
19:00 EET	Adrian Ilie 10'; Hakan Şükür 25', 32', 51', 75'	Report	Vlado Bozinovski 36'	Stadium: Ali Sami Yen Stadı; Attendance: 29,861; Referee: İbrahim Aksoy

24 May 1997 34	Bursaspor	2–3	Galatasaray SK	Bursa
19:00 EET	Elvir Baljić 14'; Tunahan Akdoğan 59'	(Report)	Hakan Şükür 37', 66' (pen.); Arif Erdem 82'	Stadium: Bursa Atatürk Stadı; Referee: Yılnur Önen

== Türkiye Kupası ==
=== Sixth round ===
28 November 1996 1	Gençlerbirliği SK	1–1	Galatasaray SK	Ankara
20:00 EET	Roger Lukaku 10'	(Report)	Hakan Ünsal 51'	Stadium: Ankara 19 Mayıs Stadı; Attendance: 15,622; Referee: Erol Ersoy

== UEFA Cup Winners' Cup ==
=== First round ===
12 September 1996 1	Constructorul Chişinău	0–1	Galatasaray SK	Chișinău
		(Report)	Adrian Knup 73'	Stadium: Stadionul Republican; Referee: (Bulgaria) Kostadin Gerginov

26 September 1996 2	Galatasaray SK	4–0	Constructorul Chişinău	Istanbul
	Hakan Şükür 49', 80'; Arif Erdem 73'; Gheorghe Hagi 75'	(Report)		Stadium: Ali Sami Yen Stadı; Referee: (Serbia) Miroslav Radoman

=== Second round ===
17 October 1996 1	Galatasaray SK	4–2	Paris Saint-Germain F.C.	Istanbul
	Hakan Şükür 5', 49'; Tugay Kerimoğlu 13'; Hakan Ünsal 31'	(Report)	Paul Le Guen 18'; Julio Dely Valdés 19'	Stadium: Ali Sami Yen Stadı; Attendance: 25,627; Referee: (Italy) Pierluigi Collina

31 October 1996 2	Paris Saint-Germain F.C.	4–0	Galatasaray SK	Paris
	Leonardo Araújo 9'; Julio Dely Valdés 22'; Patrice Loko 59'; Raí 78'	(Report)		Stadium: Parc des Princes; Referee: (Slovakia) Karol Ihring

== Süper Kupa-Cumhurbaşkanlığı Kupası ==
Kick-off listed in local time (EET)

=== 1996 ===
12 March 1997 1996 Final	Fenerbahçe SK	0–3	Galatasaray SK	Ankara
20:00 EET		(Report)	Hakan Şükür 20', 68' (pen.), 76'	Stadium: 19 Mayıs Stadı; Referee: Oğuz Sarvan

=== 1997 ===
31 May 1997 1997 Final	Galatasaray SK	2–1	Kocaelispor	Ankara
20:00 EET	Ümit Davala 59'; Hakan Şükür 116'	(Report)	Roman Dąbrowski 90'	Stadium: 19 Mayıs Stadı; Attendance: 20,000; Referee: Sabri Çelik

== Friendly Matches ==
Kick-off listed in local time (EET)

=== TSYD Kupası ===
24 July 1996 1	Fenerbahçe SK	2–0	Galatasaray SK	Istanbul
20:00 EET	Elvir Bolić 13'; Tarık Daşgün 85'	(Report)		Stadium: İnönü Stadı; Attendance: 9,845; Referee: Serdar Çakır

27 July 1996 2	Galatasaray SK	1–3	Beşiktaş JK	Istanbul
19:00 EET	Vedat İnceefe 54'	(Report)	Sergen Yalçın 14', 33'; Orhan Kaynak 21'	Stadium: İnönü Stadı; Attendance: 7,912; Referee: Sabri Çelik

=== Gurbet Kupası ===
14 July 1996 1	Trabzonspor	1–1	Galatasaray SK	Krefeld
14:00 EET	Hasan Özer 33'	(Report)	Alp Küçükvardar 43'	Stadium: Grotenburg-Stadion; Attendance: 9,845; Referee: (Germany) Frank Gettke

17 July 1996 2	Fenerbahçe SK	0–0	Galatasaray SK	Frankfurt
14:00 EET		(Report)		Stadium: Waldstadion; Referee: (Germany) Thorsten Bastian

== Attendance ==
Competition	Av. Att.	Total Att.
1. Lig	26,362	448,152
CWC	25,627	25,627
Total	26,321	473,779
