= Miško Mirković =

Serbian footballer

Personal information
- Full name: Miško Mirković
- Date of birth: 7 August 1966 (age 60)
- Place of birth: Tutin, SR Serbia, SFR Yugoslavia
- Height: 1.78 m (5 ft 10 in)
- Position: Defender

Youth career
- Radnički Beograd

Senior career*
Years	Team	Apps	(Gls)
1986–1992	OFK Beograd	149	(16)
1992–2000	Kocaelispor	252	(21)
2000–2002	Fenerbahçe	39	(3)
2002–2003	Elazığspor	16	(0)
2003–2004	Kocaelispor	15	(0)
Total		471	(40)

International career
1984	Yugoslavia U18	1	(1)
1997	FR Yugoslavia	2	(0)
- * Club domestic league appearances and goals

Miško Mirković (Serbian Cyrillic: Мишко Мирковић; born 7 August 1966) is a Serbian former professional footballer who played as a defender. He also holds Turkish citizenship under the name Mert Meriç.

== Club career ==
In the summer of 1992, Mirković moved abroad to Turkey and signed with Kocaelispor. He spent eight years with the club, making 252 appearances and scoring 21 goals in the top flight. In September 2000, Mirković was transferred to Fenerbahçe, joining his compatriot and namesake Zoran Mirković. He played 27 league games and scored once in the remainder of the 2000–01 season, helping the club win the title after five years.

== International career ==
At international level, Mirković was capped twice for FR Yugoslavia, with both appearances coming in the 1997 Korea Cup.

== Post-playing career ==
In February 2019, Mirković was appointed as sporting director of OFK Beograd.

== Career statistics ==
=== Club ===
Appearances and goals by club, season and competition
Club	Season	League			Cup		Continental		Total	
Club	Season	Division	Apps	Goals	Apps	Goals	Apps	Goals	Apps	Goals
OFK Beograd	1986–87	Yugoslav Second League	24	3	0	0	—		24	3
OFK Beograd	1987–88	Yugoslav Second League	26	2	1	0	—		27	2
OFK Beograd	1988–89	Yugoslav Second League	20	1	2	0	—		22	1
OFK Beograd	1989–90	Yugoslav Second League	15	3	0	0	—		15	3
OFK Beograd	1990–91	Yugoslav Second League	33	1	6	2	—		39	3
OFK Beograd	1991–92	Yugoslav First League	31	6	1	1	—		32	7
OFK Beograd	Total		149	16	10	3	—		159	19
Kocaelispor	1992–93	Turkish First Football League	30	6	2	1	—		32	7
Kocaelispor	1993–94	Turkish First Football League	29	3	3	1	1	0	33	4
Kocaelispor	1994–95	Turkish First Football League	34	3	3	0	—		37	3
Kocaelispor	1995–96	Turkish First Football League	34	1	2	0	—		36	1
Kocaelispor	1996–97	Turkish First Football League	34	2	7	0	3	0	44	2
Kocaelispor	1997–98	Turkish First Football League	31	2	5	0	4	0	40	2
Kocaelispor	1998–99	Turkish First Football League	24	1	3	0	—		27	1
Kocaelispor	1999–2000	Turkish First Football League	33	3	2	0	3	0	38	3
Kocaelispor	2000–01	Turkish First Football League	3	0	0	0	—		3	0
Kocaelispor	Total		252	21	27	2	11	0	290	23
Fenerbahçe	2000–01	Turkish First Football League	27	1	5	0	—		32	1
Fenerbahçe	2001–02	Süper Lig	12	2	0	0	8	0	20	2
Fenerbahçe	Total		39	3	5	0	8	0	52	3
Elazığspor	2002–03	Süper Lig	16	0	1	0	—		17	0
Kocaelispor	2003–04	1. Lig	15	0	2	0	—		17	0
Career total			471	40	45	5	19	0	535	45

=== International ===
Appearances and goals by national team and year
National team	Year	Apps	Goals
FR Yugoslavia	1997	2	0
Total		2	0

== Honours ==
Kocaelispor

- Turkish Cup: 1996–97

Fenerbahçe

- Turkish First Football League: 2000–01
