= Charvel Surfcaster =

Electric guitar

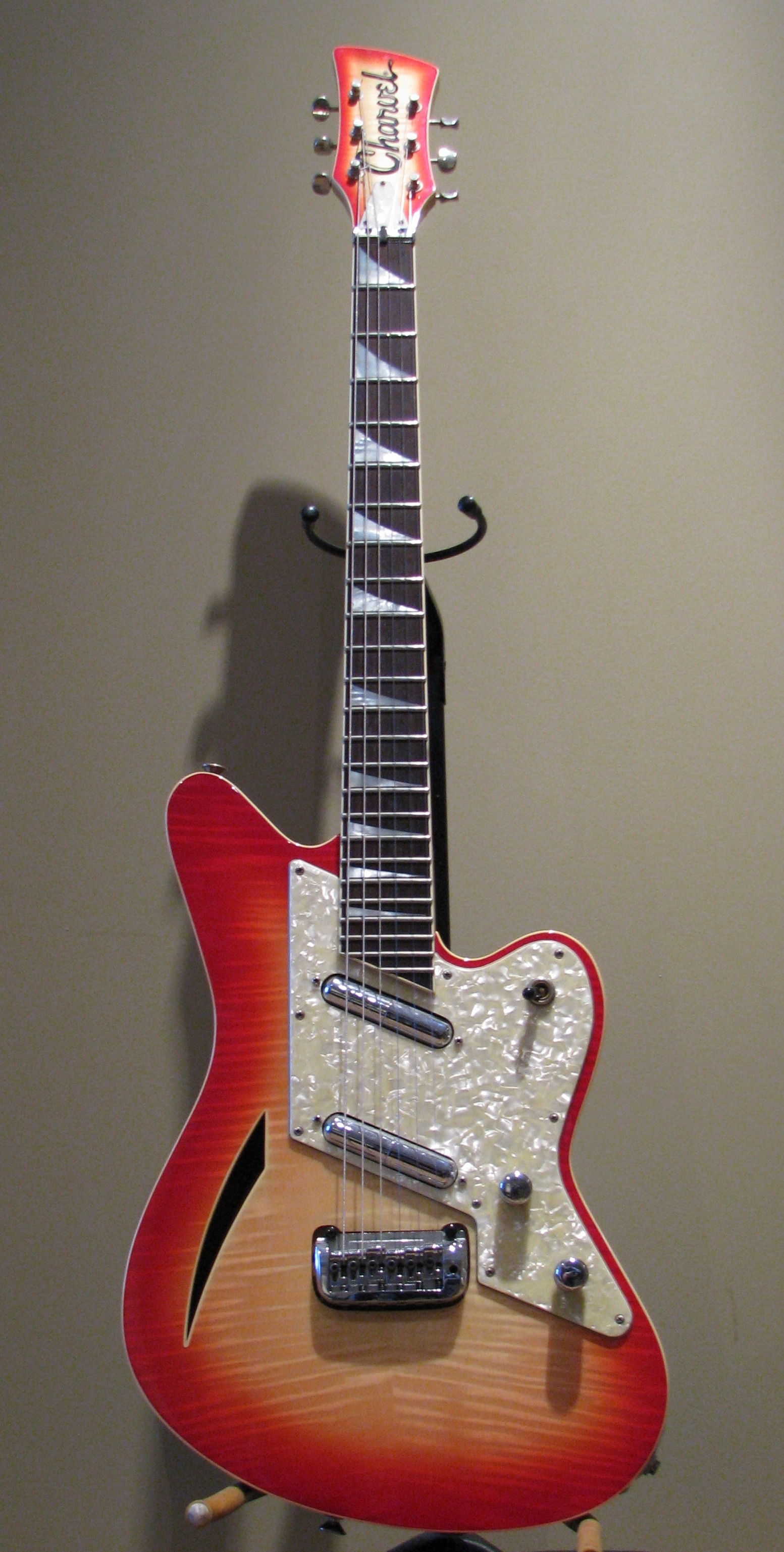
- Manufacturer: Charvel or Jackson
- Period: 1992 — 2005, 2025-

Construction
- Body type: Semi Hollow
- Neck joint: Bolt-on

Woods
- Body: Mahogany or Basswood
- Neck: Maple
- Fretboard: Rosewood or Maple

Hardware
- Bridge: Jackson JT-490 tremolo or 'C' stop tail
- Pickup(s): 2 lipstick single-coils, 1 lipstick and 1 humbucker

Colors available
- Solid colors: Sea Foam Green, Black, Magenta, Purple. Transparent finishes: Orange, Red, Cherryburst, Greenburst.

The Charvel Surfcaster is a model of electric guitar designed and produced in the early 1990s by the Charvel/Jackson guitar company. The Surfcaster was manufactured in Japan at the Chushin Gakki factory as were all the import Charvel guitars in this era. In addition the Charvel Jackson Guitar company released the Surfcaster in 1991 with advertising and public relations featuring Steve Cropper as an official endorsee. The Surfcaster has been considered a boutique style guitar that employs many retro styles from leading manufacturers of the fifties and sixties. These design aspects make it significantly different from other models by Charvel/Jackson that focused mainly on the hard rock guitarist. The Surfcaster was picked as a "Pawn Shop Prize" by Guitar Player magazine in July 2003.

== Sound and playability ==
The Surfcaster guitar is typically known for its twang and was originally targeted to the Surf Rock and Country music guitar player. The low output Chandler lipstick pickups contribute to the open airy sound. Later models with humbucker pickups appealed to Metal and Pop guitarists.

== Design ==
Originally available only in the two lipstick pickup configuration, later models would include a humbucking pickup in the bridge position. Later solid body 3 lipstick pickup variations were also produced. A twelve string and four string bass version were also created and are highly collectible. A double neck 12 string/6 string model was made in very small numbers and is now also highly collectible. In later years the Surfcaster was released under the Jackson brand name and production facilities changed from Japan to Indonesia. Quality & cosmetics suffered. When Charvel/Jackson was purchased by Fender in 2002 they dropped the Surfcaster because of its similarity to guitars sold under the Fender brand. In 2025, Jackson released several new variants redesigned and marketed towards metal players with Fender-profile necks, including a signature model for Lee Malia of United Kingdom-based metalcore band Bring Me the Horizon, and a single-pickup seven-string variant.

== Notable Surfcaster players ==
- Steve Cropper
- Bilge Kosebalaban of Direc-t
- Scott Ian of Anthrax
- Bruce Cockburn
- Tommy Victor of Prong (Cleansing era)
- Bilinda Butcher of My Bloody Valentine
- Mark Collins of The Charlatans (UK band)
- David Lowery of Cracker/Camper Van Beethoven
- Barry Hay of Golden Earring
- Richard Edwards of Margot and the Nuclear So and So's
- Martin Phillipps of The Chills
- Xavier Boyer of Tahiti 80
- Ryosuke Nagaoka
- Will Sergeant of Echo & the Bunnymen
- Vince Gill
