= Bilgen =

Bilgen is a Turkish surname, related to the name Bilge, meaning wise.

Notable people with this name include:

- Ayhan Bilgen (born 1971), Turkish journalist and politician
- Bülent Kaan Bilgen (born 1977), Austrian footballer of Turkish origin
- İbrahim Bilgen (1949–2010), Turkish politician
- Samim Bilgen (1910–2005), Turkish violinist
- Üstün Bilgen-Reinart (born 1947), Turkish-Canadian writer

== See also ==
- Bilge, Turkish given name
