= Bilge (disambiguation) =

The bilge is the lowest compartment on a ship.

Bilge may also refer to:

- Bilge, Mardin, a Turkish village
- Bilge (name), people with the name
