= Hikmet Karaman =

Turkish football manager

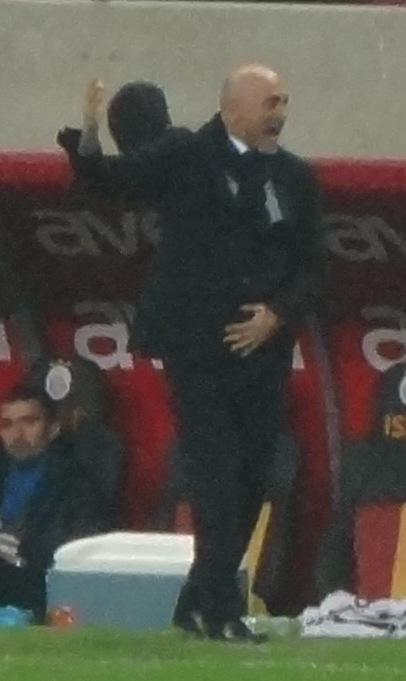
- Karaman in 2012

Personal information
- Date of birth: March 9, 1960 (age 66)
- Place of birth: Tirebolu, Giresun, Turkey
- Height: 1.75 m (5 ft 9 in)

Team information
- Current team: Esenler Erokspor (manager)

Managerial career
- Years: Team
- 1998: Zeytinburnuspor
- 1998–1999: Erzurumspor
- 1999: Çaykur Rizespor
- 1999–2000: Adanaspor
- 2000–2003: Kocaelispor
- 2003–2004: Çaykur Rizespor
- 2004–2005: Kayserispor
- 2006: Ankaragücü
- 2006: Malatyaspor
- 2006–2007: Ankaragücü
- 2007–2008: Ankaraspor
- 2008: Antalyaspor
- 2009: Ankaragücü
- 2010–2011: Manisaspor
- 2012–2013: Gaziantepspor
- 2013: Bursaspor
- 2013–2014: Kayseri Erciyesspor
- 2014–2017: Çaykur Rizespor
- 2018: Alanyaspor
- 2018–2019: Kayserispor
- 2020: Yeni Malatyaspor
- 2021: Ankaragücü
- 2021–2022: Kayserispor
- 2024: Adana Demirspor
- 2024–2025: Zimbru Chișinău
- 2026: Iğdır
- 2026: Iğdır (director of football)
- 2026–: Esenler Erokspor

Hikmet Karaman (born March 9, 1960) is a UEFA pro licensed Turkish football manager who is in charge of TFF 1. Lig club Esenler Erokspor.

In the beginning of his coaching career, Hikmet Karaman worked as an assistant coach for managers like Reinhard Saftig and Mustafa Denizli in Galatasaray and Kocaelispor, as well as Holger Osieck in both Kocaelispor and Fenerbahçe. As a head coach he previously worked for clubs, such as, Kocaelispor, Zeytinburnuspor, Erzurumspor, Çaykur Rizespor, Adanaspor, Kayserispor, MKE Ankaragücü, Ankaraspor, Antalyaspor, Manisaspor, and Gaziantepspor, respectively. During his career he has won the Turkish Cup with Kocaelispor and the TFF 1. Lig with Çaykur Rizespor and Antalyaspor.

== Biography ==
=== Professional career and education ===
He was born in Tirebolu, Giresun, Turkey on March 9, 1960. He holds a UEFA Pro-License and can speak German at advanced level and English at an elementary level. Hikmet Karaman started his Football career in the junior category of Kocaelispor; as a striker first, then as a midfielder, and finally as a left-back. While studying in Berlin, Germany, he played at Rot-Weiß football club. After Rot-Weiß, he played for Normania 08 club in Germany. Then he served as a trainer-player for Berlin Turkspor 1965, where they won the championships of A Liga, Landes Liga, and raised the team to the German third division. Hikmet Karaman received his C, B and A licenses at the Köln Hennef Sportschule. His course lecturers were Bernt Stöber, Holger Osieck, Rute Muller and Berti Vogts. Currently, Hikmet Karaman holds a UEFA pro-license.

=== 1994–2001 ===
In 1994, Hikmet Karaman returned to Turkey and worked for Kocaelispor as assistant coach, together with Reinhard Saftig. In 1995–1996, he was passed to Galatasaray together with Reinhard Saftig, as an assistant manager. That year, Galatasaray played against IFK Göteborg, Manchester United and Barcelona in the UEFA Champions League. In the 1997–1998 season, he came back to Kocaelispor and worked as the assistant for Mustafa Denizli, the former coach of Turkey national team, Galatasaray, Fenerbahçe and Beşiktaş. Later in 1998, Hikmet Karaman worked with Holger Osieck and won the Turkish Cup. In 1999, he left Kocaelispor and started his career as head coach with Zeytinburnuspor. He stayed there half a season and then moved to Erzurumspor in Turkish Super League. Again only spending half a season there, in 1999, Hikmet Karaman took over Adanaspor. He took the team that was last and finished them within the first eight. He stayed in Adanaspor for two years, until 2001.

=== 2001–2004 ===
In 2001, Hikmet Karaman came back to Kocaelispor, who had only gotten 9 points in 16 games, and completed the season with 41 points. To add to his success, he defeated Galatasaray, coached by Mircea Lucescu, with a score of 3–2 in Istanbul and won the next year's Turkish Cup by defeating another Istanbul giant, Beşiktaş, coached by Christoph Daum with even a more jaw-dropping score of 4–0 in the final. This victory had entitled his team to join the UEFA Cup. Furthermore, during the preparatory camp for this season, his team defeated Arsenal coached by Arsène Wenger with a remarkable score of 4–1. After spending two years in Kocaelispor, Hikmet Karaman worked for Çaykur Rizespor and left this job in February 2004 after a loss to Denizlispor at home.

=== 2004–2010 ===
In the same year, Hikmet Karaman started coaching Kayserispor. He came to the job facing a challenging problem. Kayserispor had only been able to accumulate 2 points in the first 7 weeks of the season before his arrival. He successfully laid the foundations of today's Kayserispor by getting only 4 losses in 17 games in the second half. Thus, he was able to save Kayserispor from relegation. In the summer of 2006, he signed with MKE Ankaragücü again in the Turkish Super League. The following season, he left MKE Ankaragücü for Ankaraspor. Hikmet Karaman helped Ankaraspor, which had only received 3 points in 9 games with no wins, stay in the Super League at the end of the season. In 2008, Hikmet Karaman started managing Antalyaspor in the second division and led the team to a promotion. In the 2009–2010 season, Hikmet Karaman came back to MKE Ankaragücü towards the end of the season and helped the team stay in the Super League, with five wins, in spite of the negative expectations. In 2010, he took over Manisaspor with 0 points after four games, and finished the season with 41 points with, even, some victories against The Big Three.

=== 2012– ===
In the 2012–13 season, Hikmet Karaman came to Gaziantepspor, replacing Abdullah Ercan. On February 4, 2013, Hikmet Karaman terminated his contract with Gaziantepspor and signed with Bursaspor two days later. After defeat of 0–3 at home to FK Vojvodina in UEFA Europa League second qualifying round, he was dismissed from Bursaspor, just before beginning of Turkish Super League 2013–14 season. On 11 December 2014, he was appointed as the manager of Çaykur Rizespor after Mehmet Özdilek. During the 2014-2015 season, he coached Rizespor for 22 matches and finished 14th in the league. He was kept as the manager of Rizespor in the following three seasons, coaching the team for 128 matches until he parted ways with the club by mutual agreement in 2017.

On 18 October 2024, the Moldovan Super Liga club Zimbru Chisinau announced that they had reached an agreement with Karaman for the head coach position.

On 10 September 2026, Karaman was hired by Esenler Erokspor.

== Honours ==
Kocaelispor

- Turkish Cup: 2001–02

== Managerial statistics ==
As of 2 March 2019

Managerial record by team and tenure
Team	Nat	From	To	Record				
Team	Nat	From	To	G	W	D	L	Win %
Zeytinburnuspor	(Turkey)	7 May 1998	1 July 1998	2	0	1	1	0.00
Erzurumspor	(Turkey)	1 July 1998	22 April 1999	34	11	8	15	32.35
Çaykur Rizespor	(Turkey)	22 April 1999	1 December 1999	21	14	1	6	66.67
Adanaspor	(Turkey)	1 December 1999	8 December 2000	41	15	9	17	36.59
Kocaelispor	(Turkey)	8 December 2000	19 February 2003	84	33	14	37	39.29
Çaykur Rizespor	(Turkey)	19 February 2003	1 October 2004	61	30	8	23	49.18
Kayserispor	(Turkey)	1 October 2004	30 June 2005	31	10	9	12	32.26
Ankaragücü	(Turkey)	10 February 2006	30 June 2006	17	6	3	8	35.29
Malatyaspor	(Turkey)	30 June 2006	15 September 2006	4	2	1	1	50.00
Ankaragücü	(Turkey)	15 September 2006	17 July 2007	34	15	6	13	44.12
Ankaraspor	(Turkey)	17 July 2007	4 March 2008	20	7	7	6	35.00
Antalyaspor	(Turkey)	31 March 2008	14 August 2008	7	3	3	1	42.86
Ankaragücü	(Turkey)	24 March 2009	12 November 2009	22	9	4	9	40.91
Manisaspor	(Turkey)	14 September 2010	30 June 2011	35	14	4	17	40.00
Gaziantepspor	(Turkey)	27 January 2012	4 February 2013	36	16	7	13	44.44
Bursaspor	(Turkey)	6 February 2013	13 August 2013	17	8	4	5	47.06
Kayseri Erciyesspor	(Turkey)	23 December 2013	31 May 2014	19	7	4	8	36.84
Çaykur Rizespor	(Turkey)	14 December 2014	5 October 2017	128	50	28	50	39.06
Alanyaspor	(Turkey)	3 January 2018	26 February 2018	6	1	0	5	16.67
Kayserispor	(Turkey)	6 December 2018		44	18	11	15	40.91
Total				663	269	132	262	40.57
