= Detlef Müller (footballer) =

Turkish footballer (born 1965)

Metin Mert
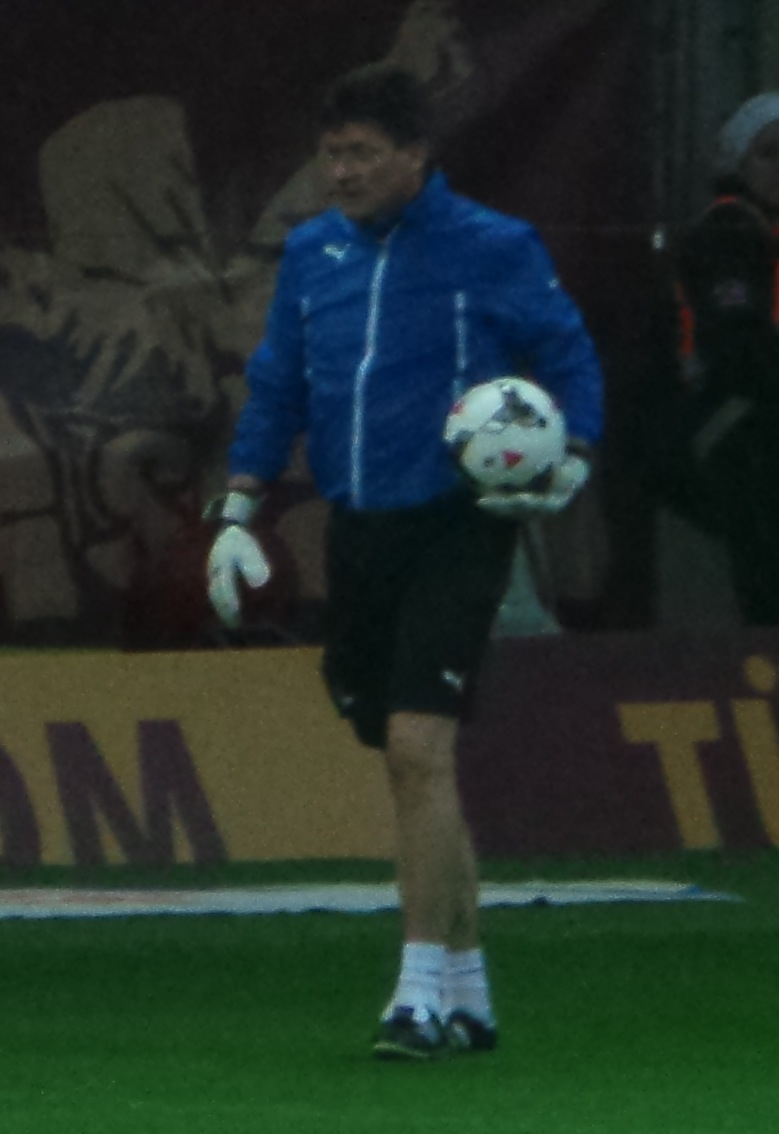

Personal information
- Birth name: Detlef Müller
- Date of birth: 21 May 1965 (age 61)
- Place of birth: Duisburg, West Germany
- Height: 1.80 m (5 ft 11 in)
- Position: Goalkeeper

Youth career
- SV Wanheim 1900
- Duisburger SV 1900
- VfB Homberg
- –1984: VfL Bochum

Senior career*
Years	Team	Apps	(Gls)
1983–1985	VfL Bochum II	5	(0)
1985–1988	Westfalia Herne		
1988–1995	Sarıyer		
1995–1997	Trabzonspor	19	(0)
1997–2002	Kocaelispor	73	(0)
2002–2003	Konyaspor	34	(0)
2003–2004	Antalyaspor	14	(0)

Managerial career
- 2005–2006: Ankaragücü (assistant coach)
- 2006–2008: Rizespor (goalkeeping coach)
- 2008: Ankaraspor (goalkeeping coach)
- 2008–2009: Malatyaspor (goalkeeping coach)
- 2009–2010: Eyüpspor (goalkeeping coach)
- 2010–2011: Denizlispor (goalkeeping coach)
- 2011–2014: Akhisar (goalkeeping coach)
- 2014–: Galatasaray (goalkeeping coach)
- * Club domestic league appearances and goals

Metin Mert (born Detlef Müller; 21 May 1965) is a German-born naturalised Turkish professional footballer who played as a goalkeeper.

== Career ==
Detlef Müller was born Duisburg, West Germany. His first Oberliga game for Bochum II was on 31 December 1983 in a 3–0 win against Hammer SpVg. He was substituted on in the 75th minute for Markus Croonen. In summer 1985 Müller transferred to Westfalia Herne, where he played until 1988.

During a vacation to Turkey in 1988 Müller was spotted by Erdal Keser playing Beach soccer. He was offered a contract from Sarıyer out of the Turkish First Football League, which he accepted.

== Career statistics ==
Appearances and goals by club, season and competition
Club	Season	League			Cup (Note: Includes DFB-Pokal, Turkish Cup)		Continental		Total	
Club	Season	Division	Apps	Goals	Apps	Goals	Apps	Goals	Apps	Goals
VfL Bochum II	1983–84	Oberliga Westfalen	5	0	—		—		5	0
VfL Bochum II	1984–85	Oberliga Westfalen	0	0	0	0	—		0	0
VfL Bochum II	Total		5	0	0	0	0	0	5	0
Westfalia Herne	1985–86	Oberliga Westfalen	27	0	—		—		27	0
Westfalia Herne	1986–87	Oberliga Westfalen			—		—			
Westfalia Herne	1987–88	Oberliga Westfalen			—		—			
Westfalia Herne	Total				0	0	0	0		
Sarıyer	1988–89	1.Lig					—			
Sarıyer	1989–90	1.Lig					—			
Sarıyer	1990–91	1.Lig	29	0	2	0	—		31	0
Sarıyer	1991–92	1.Lig	22	0	1	0	—		23	0
Sarıyer	1992–93	1.Lig	19	0	2	0	—		21	0
Sarıyer	1993–94	1.Lig	25	0	2	0	—		27	0
Sarıyer	1994–95	2.Lig	20	0	3	0	—		23	0
Sarıyer	Total									
Trabzonspor	1995–96	1.Lig	19	0	1	0	1	0	21	0
Trabzonspor	1996–97	1.Lig	0	0	0	0	0	0	0	0
Trabzonspor	Total		19	0	1	0	1	0	21	0
Kocaelispor	1997–98	1.Lig	11	0	2	0	0	0	13	0
Kocaelispor	1998–99	1.Lig	5	0	0	0	—		5	0
Kocaelispor	1999–2000	1.Lig	10	0	0	0				
Kocaelispor	2000–01	1.Lig	28	0	3	0	—		31	0
Kocaelispor	2001–02	Süper Lig	19	0	4	0	—		23	0
Kocaelispor	Total		73	0	9	0				
Konyaspor	2002–03	1.Lig	34	0	2	0	—		36	0
Antalyaspor	2003–04	1.Lig	14	0	1	0	—		15	0
Career total										

== Honours ==
Kocaelispor

- Turkish Cup: 2002
