= Kwame Ayew =

Ghanaian footballer (born 1973)

Personal information
- Date of birth: 28 December 1973 (age 52)
- Place of birth: Tamale, Ghana
- Height: 1.79 m (5 ft 10 in)
- Position: Striker

Youth career
- 1990: Africa Sports

Senior career*
Years	Team	Apps	(Gls)
1990–1992	Metz		
1992–1993	Al Ahli	22	(14)
1993–1995	Lecce	34	(7)
1995–1996	União Leiria	13	(1)
1996–1997	Vitória Setúbal	23	(8)
1997–1999	Boavista	56	(31)
1999–2000	Sporting CP	26	(7)
2000–2001	Yozgatspor	19	(11)
2001–2002	Kocaelispor	28	(10)
2002–2003	Shenyang Ginde	28	(14)
2004–2006	Inter Shanghai	56	(26)
2007	Vitória Setúbal	12	(3)
Total		317	(132)

International career
1992–2001	Ghana	25	(9)
Medal record
Men's association football
Representing Ghana
Olympic Games
Bronze medal – third place	1992 Barcelona	Team competition
- * Club domestic league appearances and goals

Kwame Ayew (born 28 December 1973) is a Ghanaian former professional footballer who played as a striker.

During nearly 20 years he played professionally in six countries, mainly in Portugal where he appeared for four teams in the 90s, amassing Primeira Liga totals of 131 games and 51 goals over the course of six seasons.

== Club career ==
Born in Tamale, Ayew started playing professionally in France at only 17, spending a couple of Ligue 1 seasons with FC Metz, then moved to Qatar with Al Ahli SC and played in another country in the following two years, Italy, appearing and scoring sparingly for U.S. Lecce (for instance, he netted four goals in 1993–94's Serie A as his club ranked last with only 28 goals, a competition-worst).

Ayew moved to Portugal in 1995, and would remain there in the following five years. He started with U.D. Leiria and Vitória de Setúbal, then impressed at Boavista F.C. also in the Primeira Liga, scoring 15 times in 27 games in his second season to earn his team a best-ever at the time runner-up place, behind neighbours FC Porto.

After nearly 50 official goals for Boavista, Ayew moved to country giants Sporting Clube de Portugal. Even though he was never an automatic first-choice (having to battle for a starting berth with Alberto Acosta, Edmílson and Mbo Mpenza), he netted seven goals in 13 starts as the Lions ended an 18-year drought and conquered the national championship.

In the following years Ayew would play in Turkey (two seasons) and China (five), rarely settling with a club. In January 2007 the 33-year-old returned to former side Setúbal, contributing solidly as the Sadinos avoided top flight relegation by one point; he retired from the game shortly after.

== International career ==
Ayew was a member of the Ghana national team that won the bronze medal at the 1992 Summer Olympics in Barcelona, scoring six goals in as many games. In total, he won 25 senior caps.

== Personal life ==
Football ran in Ayew's family: his brothers Abedi and Sola also played football, the former spending a big part of his career with Olympique de Marseille. His nephews, André, Jordan and Rahim, also played the sport professionally.

Ayew attended Ghana Senior High School in Tamale.

== Career statistics ==
Appearances and goals by club, season and competition
Club	Season	League		
Club	Season	Division	Apps	Goals
Metz B	1990–91			
Metz B	1991–92			
Metz B	Total			
Al Ahli	1992–93	Qatar Stars League	22	14
Lecce	1993–94	Serie A	18	3
Lecce	1994–95	Serie B	16	4
Lecce	Total		34	7
União Leiria	1995–96	Primeira Liga	13	1
Vitória Setúbal	1996–97	Primeira Liga	23	8
Boavista	1997–98	Primeira Liga	29	16
Boavista	1998–99	Primeira Liga	27	15
Boavista	Total		56	31
Sporting	1999–2000	Primeira Liga	26	7
Yozgatspor	2000–01	Süper Lig	19	11
Kocaelispor	2001–02	Süper Lig	28	10
Shenyang Ginde	2003	Chinese Jia-A League	28	14
Inter Shanghai, Inter Xian (Note: Renaming in 2006)	2004	Chinese Super League	20	17
Inter Shanghai, Inter Xian	2005	Chinese Super League	23	8
Inter Shanghai, Inter Xian	2006	Chinese Super League	13	1
Inter Shanghai, Inter Xian	Total		56	26
Vitória Setúbal	2006–07	Primeira Liga	12	3
Career total			317	132

== Honours ==
Boavista

- Supertaça de Portugal: 1997

Sporting

- Primeira Liga: 1999–2000

Kocaelispor

- Turkish Cup: 2001–02

Ghana

- Olympic Bronze Medal: 1992
