= Ömer Topraktepe =

Turkish footballer

Personal information
- Full name: Ömer Topraktepe
- Date of birth: March 1, 1980 (age 46)
- Place of birth: Istanbul, Turkey
- Height: 1.82 m (6 ft 0 in)
- Position: Defender

Youth career
- 1996–1997: Fatih Karagümrük S.K.
- 1997–1999: Gençlerbirliği S.K.

Senior career*
Years	Team	Apps	(Gls)
1999–2005	Gençlerbirliği S.K.	69	(0)
2003–2004	→ Osmanlıspor (loan)	28	(2)
2004–2005	→ Türk Telekom GSK (loan)	27	(1)
2005–2011	Türk Telekom GSK	167	(7)
2011–2013	Kızılcahamamspor	34	(1)
2013	Ünyespor	12	(1)

International career
1995–1996	Turkey U15	7	(0)
1995–1997	Turkey U16	24	(0)
1997–1998	Turkey U17	10	(0)
1997–1998	Turkey U18	7	(2)
- * Club domestic league appearances and goals

Ömer Topraktepe (born 2 March 1980) is a Turkish retired footballer best known for his stints as a defender with Gençlerbirliği S.K. in the Süper Lig, and Türk Telekom GSK in the TFF First League.

== Professional career ==
Topraktepe was a professional footballer in the top divisions of Turkey from 1999–2013. He made his professional debut with Gençlerbirliği S.K. in a 1–1 Süper Lig tie with Vanspor on 19 May 1999.

== Personal life ==
Ömer is the brother of the footballer Serdar Topraktepe.

== Honours ==
Gençlerbirliği

- Turkish Cup: 2000–01
