= Bilge (name) =

Bilge is a unisex Turkish given name. In Turkish, it means "wise" or "sage". The name is historically significant, as it was borne by Bilge Kağan, a ruler of the Second Turkic Khaganate in the 8th century.

== Given name ==
- Bilge Ebiri (born 1973), Turkish-American journalist and filmmaker
- Bilge Kağan, Göktürk ruler
- Kutlug I Bilge Khagan, founder of Uyghur Khaganate
- Bilge Demirköz (born 1980), Turkish professor
- Bilge Karasu (1930–1995), Turkish writer
- Bilge Kösebalaban (born 1980), Turkish musician
- Bilge Olgaç (1940–1994), Turkish film director
- Bilge Su Koyun (born 1999), Turkish women's footballer
- Bilge Tarhan (footballer) (1941–2016), Turkish Olympian footballer
- Bilge Tarhan (gymnast) (born 2004), Turkish female artistic gymnast
- Bilge Umar (1936–2023), Turkish writer
- Bilge Yıldız, Turkish nuclear engineer
- Nuri Bilge Ceylan (born 1959), Turkish film director
- Bilge Tonyukuk (646–726), Supreme Commander of Second Turkic Khaganate

== Surname ==
- Dilara Bilge, Turkish volleyball player
- Melek Bilge, Turkish basketball player

== See also ==
- Bilgen, list of people with a similar Turkish surname
- Bilgehan, list of people with a similar Turkish name
