= Bilgehan =

Bilgehan is a Turkish masculine name and a surname. It is a reference to Bilge Qaghan. In Turkish it has the meaning of a khan with deep knowledge.

Notable people with the name include:

- Ayşe Gülsün Bilgehan (born 1957), Turkish politician
- Cihat Bilgehan (1923–1981), Turkish jurist and politician

== See also ==
- Bilge (name), list of people with a similar name
