= 2001–02 Turkish Cup =

Türkiye Kupası

Tournament details
- Country: Turkey
- Teams: 64

Final positions
- Champions: Kocaelispor
- Runners-up: Beşiktaş

Tournament statistics
- Top goal scorer(s): Mehmet Yılmaz (5 goals)

The 2001–02 Turkish Cup was the 43rd edition of the annual tournament that determined the association football Super League (Süper Lig) Turkish Cup (Turkish: Türkiye Kupası) champion under the auspices of the Turkish Football Federation (Turkish: Türkiye Futbol Federasyonu; TFF). Kocaelispor successfully contested Beşiktaş by 4–0 in the final. The results of the tournament also determined which clubs would be promoted or relegated.

== First round ==
Team 1	Score	Team 2
Kütahyaspor	0–2	Çanakkale Dardanelspor
Cizrespor	2–0	Mardinspor
Gaziantep BB	2–0	Adana Demirspor
Iğdır Belediyespor	1–0	Bulancakspor
Tokatspor	0–1	Amasyaspor
Türk Telekom	3–2	Ankara Demirspor
Ispartaspor	2–1	Uşakspor
Mustafakemalpaşaspor	0–2	Sapancaspor
Yıldırım Bosnaspor	1–5	Kartalspor
Küçükköyspor	2–0	Gaziosmanpaşa
Batman Petrolspor	2–3 (aet)	Silopi Cudispor
Kahramanmaraşspor	4–0	Kayserispor
Mobellaspor	2–0	Ankaraspor
İzmirspor	0–1	Marmaris Belediyespor
Aydınspor	3–2	Karşıyaka
Sakaryaspor	4–2	Maltepespor
Gümüşhane Doğanspor	1–1 (3–0 p)	Akçaabat Sebatspor
Şanlıurfaspor	1–1 (5–3 p)	Malatyaspor

== Second round ==
Team 1	Score	Team 2
Elazığspor	2–1	Silopi Cudispor
Hatayspor	0–1 (aet)	Kahramanmaraşspor
Şanlıurfaspor	1–1 (3–5 p)	Gaziantep BB
Iğdır Belediyespor	1–1 (5–4 p)	Amasyaspor
Ispartaspor	2–1	Şekerspor
Türk Telekom	1–0	Konyaspor
Mobellaspor	2–3	Kayseri Erciyesspor
Marmaris Belediyespor	0–0 (3–5 p)	Altay
Küçükköyspor	0–4	Sakaryaspor
Çanakkale Dardanelspor	4–2	Kartalspor
İstanbul BB	3–0	Sapancaspor
Gümüşhane Doğanspor	2–2 (5–4 p)	Sivasspor
Cizrespor	0–2	Diyarbakırspor
Aydınspor	0–1	Göztepe

== Third round ==
Team 1	Score	Team 2
Gümüşhane Doğanspor	0–0 (4–5 p)	İstanbulspor
Erzurumspor	1–0 (aet)	Galatasaray
Çanakkale Dardanelspor	2–1	Elazığspor
Kahramanmaraşspor	0–4	Yimpaş Yozgatspor
Samsunspor	7–1	Siirt Jetpa
Kocaelispor	3–1	Türk Telekom
Ispartaspor	2–3	Gaziantepspor
Denizlispor	2–0	Kayseri Erciyesspor
Gaziantep BB	0–0 (4–5 p)	Çaykur Rizespor
Göztepe	3–2 (aet)	Bursaspor
İstanbul BB	1–2	Trabzonspor
Beşiktaş	2–1 (aet)	Sakaryaspor
Adanaspor	4–0	Antalyaspor
Ankaragücü	2–0	Diyarbakırspor
Fenerbahçe	3–0	Altay
Gençlerbirliği	2–1	Iğdır Belediyespor

== Fourth round ==
Team 1	Score	Team 2
Fenerbahçe	1–2	Denizlispor
Erzurumspor	2–2 (5–3 p)	Göztepe
Adanaspor	2–1 (aet)	Ankaragücü
Çanakkale Dardanelspor	0–2	İstanbulspor
Trabzonspor	3–0	Samsunspor
Gaziantepspor	2–0	Çaykur Rizespor
Beşiktaş	4–0	Yimpaş Yozgatspor
Kocaelispor	2–1	Gençlerbirliği

== Bracket ==
Quarter-finals
Erzurumspor	0
Kocaelispor (a.e.t.)	1
İstanbulspor	1
Adanaspor	2
Trabzonspor	0
Denizlispor	1
Gaziantepspor	2
Beşiktaş (a.e.t.)	3

Semi-finals
Kocaelispor	1
Adanaspor	0
Denizlispor	0
Beşiktaş	1

Final
Kocaelispor	4
Beşiktaş	0

== Quarter-finals ==
Team 1	Score	Team 2
Trabzonspor	0–1	Denizlispor
Erzurumspor	0–1	Kocaelispor
İstanbulspor	1–2	Adanaspor
Gaziantepspor	2–3	Beşiktaş

== Semi-finals ==
=== Summary table ===
Team 1	Score	Team 2
Kocaelispor	1–0	Adanaspor
Denizlispor	0–1	Beşiktaş

=== Matches ===
6 March 2002 Semi-final	Kocaelispor	1–0	Adanaspor	İzmit, Turkey
18:00 EET (UTC+02)	Lazarov 31'	Report		Stadium: İzmit İsmetpaşa Stadium; Referee: Sabit Hacıömeroğlu

6 March 2002 Semi-final	Denizlispor	0–1	Beşiktaş	Denizli, Turkey
20:00 EET (UTC+02)		Report	İlhan 51'	Stadium: Denizli Atatürk Stadium; Referee: Serdar Tatlı

== Final ==
3 April 2002 Final	Kocaelispor	4–0	Beşiktaş	Bursa, Turkey
20:30 EEST (UTC+03)	Cihan 44'; Lazarov 59'; Dabrowski 82'; Serdar 83'	Report		Stadium: Bursa Atatürk Stadium; Attendance: 18,000; Referee: Metin Tokat
