= 1996–97 Turkish Cup =

Türkiye Kupası

Tournament details
- Country: Turkey
- Teams: 87

Final positions
- Champions: Kocaelispor
- Runners-up: Trabzonspor

Tournament statistics
- Matches played: 93
- Goals scored: 298 (3.2 per match)
- Top goal scorer: Burhan Kaba (8 goals)

The 1996–97 Turkish Cup was the 35th edition of the tournament that determined the association football Süper Lig Turkish Cup (Turkish: Türkiye Kupası) champion under the auspices of the Turkish Football Federation (Turkish: Türkiye Futbol Federasyonu; TFF). champion under the auspices of the Turkish Football Federation (Turkish: Türkiye Futbol Federasyonu; TFF). Kocaelispor successfully contested Trabzonspor on both legs of the finals. The results of the tournament also determined which clubs would be promoted or relegated.

== First round ==
Team 1	Score	Team 2
Marmarisspor	2–1 (aet)	Ispartaspor
İzmirspor	0–1	Manisaspor
Bursa Merinosspor	2–2 (4–5 p)	Pendikspor
Tepecik Fıratpenspor	7–1	Eyüpspor
Çerkezköy Profilospor	1–2	İstanbul B.B.
İskenderun DÇ	1–2	Sankospor
Aksarayspor	2–1	Nevşehirspor
Askispor	2–0	Keçiörengücü
Akçaabat Sebatspor	1–0	Trabzon Telekomspor
Batman Petrolspor	2–1	Kurtalanspor

== Second round ==
Team 1	Score	Team 2
Marmarisspor	5–1	Muğlaspor
Alanyaspor	1–0	Kemerspor
Kuşadasıspor	2–1	Yeni Turgutluspor
Manisaspor	3–2	Yeni Salihlispor
Bucaspor	2–1	Aydınspor
Soma Linyitspor	1–3	Yeni Afyonspor
Karşıyaka	0–0 (4–5 p)	Göztepe
Sakaryaspor	1–2	Eskişehirspor
İnegölspor	2–1	Balıkesirspor
Nişantaşıspor	4–1	Anadolu Hisarı İ.Y.
İstanbul B.B.	0–1	Gaziosmanpaşa
Bakırköyspor	1–2	Beylerbeyi
Tepecik Fıratpenspor	3–3 (3–4 p)	Kartalspor
Pendikspor	2–1	Edirnespor
Adana Demirspor	4–0	Hatayspor
Mersin İdman Yurdu	2–2 (4–3 p)	İskenderun DÇ
Sankospor	3–2 (aet)	Adıyamanspor
Konyaspor	0–3	Kayserispor
Aksarayspor	4–2	Yeni Yozgatspor
Şekerspor	0–3 (aet)	PTT
Askispor	0–3	Ankara Demirspor
Çorumspor	1–2	Zonguldakspor
Düzcespor	3–2 (aet)	Kardemir D.Ç. Karabükspor
Diyarbakırspor	4–1	Batman Petrolspor
Siirt Köy Hiz.Yse Spor	2–0	Elazığspor
Akçaabat Sebatspor	3–2	Çaykur Rizespor
Artvin Hopaspor	4–3	Ünyespor
Erzincanspor	2–2 (4–2 p)	Erzurumspor
Şanlıurfaspor	3–3 (5–3 p)	Adanaspor

== Third round ==
Team 1	Score	Team 2
Yeni Afyonspor	1–1 (3–4 p)	PTT
Marmarisspor	2–1	Alanyaspor
Manisaspor	1–3	Göztepe
Bucaspor	0–1	Kuşadasıspor
Beylerbeyi	2–1 (aet)	Gaziosmanpaşa
Kartalspor	1–1 (4–5 p)	İnegölspor
Nişantaşıspor	3–3 (2–4 p)	Pendikspor
Adana Demirspor	2–1	Mersin İdman Yurdu
Sankospor	4–1	Şanlıurfaspor
Aksarayspor	0–4	Kayserispor
Ankara Demirspor	2–1	Eskişehirspor
Zonguldakspor	2–3	Düzcespor
Diyarbakırspor	1–0	Siirt Köy Hiz.Yse Spor
Erzincanspor	2–1	Malatyaspor
Artvin Hopaspor	1–2	Akçaabat Sebatspor

== Fourth round ==
Team 1	Score	Team 2
Marmarisspor	1–0	Kuşadasıspor
Çanakkale Dardanelspor	1–0	Göztepe
Pendikspor	0–1	Zeytinburnuspor
Beylerbeyi	1–2 (aet)	Sarıyer
Adana Demirspor	1–0	Kayserispor
Ankara Demirspor	0–0 (4–3 p)	PTT
Düzcespor	2–1	İnegölspor
Diyarbakırspor	1–2	Sankospor
Erzincanspor	3–0	Akçaabat Sebatspor

== Fifth round ==
Team 1	Score	Team 2
İstanbulspor	4–0	Ankara Demirspor
Bursaspor	1–1 (4–1 p)	Adana Demirspor
Zeytinburnuspor	2–2 (1–3 p)	Altay
Çanakkale Dardanelspor	3–2 (aet)	Sarıyer
Marmarisspor	1–1 (4–2 p)	Denizlispor
Ankaragücü	4–1	Erzincanspor
Sankospor	5–2	Düzcespor
Gençlerbirliği	5–0	Vanspor

== Sixth round ==
Team 1	Score	Team 2
İstanbulspor	2–3	Beşiktaş
Fenerbahçe	4–0	Marmarisspor
Altay	0–2 (aet)	Trabzonspor
Sankospor	1–4 (aet)	Gaziantepspor
Samsunspor	2–0	Bursaspor
Ankaragücü	3–1 (aet)	Antalyaspor
Kocaelispor	3–0	Çanakkale Dardanelspor
Gençlerbirliği	1–1 (17–16 p)	Galatasaray

== Quarter-finals ==
Team 1	Agg.	Team 2	1st leg	2nd leg
Trabzonspor	6–1	Gençlerbirliği	4–1	2–1
Gaziantepspor	3–3 (a)	Ankaragücü	1–1	2–2
Kocaelispor	1–0	Samsunspor	1–0	0–0
Fenerbahçe	3–4	Beşiktaş	2–2	1–2

== Semi-finals ==
=== Summary table ===
Team 1	Agg.	Team 2	1st leg	2nd leg
Gaziantepspor	0–2	Trabzonspor	0–0	0–2
Kocaelispor	2–2 (a)	Beşiktaş	1–0	1–2

=== 1st leg ===
19 February 1997 Semi-final	Gaziantepspor	0–0	Trabzonspor	Gaziantep
18:00 EET (UTC+02)				Stadium: Kamil Ocak Stadium; Referee: Ünsal Çimen

19 February 1997 Semi-final	Kocaelispor	1–0	Beşiktaş	Kocaeli
20:00 EET (UTC+02)	Faruk 21'			Stadium: İsmetpaşa Stadium; Referee: İlhami Kaplan

=== 2nd leg ===
4 March 1997 Semi-final	Beşiktaş	2–1	Kocaelispor	Istanbul
20:00 EET (UTC+02)	Oktay 40' (pen.), 51'		Moshoeu 14'	Stadium: BJK İnönü Stadium; Referee: Vahap Beyaz

5 March 1997 Semi-final	Trabzonspor	2–0	Gaziantepspor	Trabzon
18:00 EET (UTC+02)	Arveladze 20'; Hami 80'			Stadium: Hüseyin Avni Aker Stadium; Referee: Mustafa Çulcu

== Final ==
=== 1st leg ===
19 March 1997 Final	Trabzonspor	1–1	Kocaelispor	Trabzon, Turkey
19:00 EET (UTC+02)	İskender 25'		Soner 67'	Stadium: Hüseyin Avni Aker Stadium; Referee: Ahmet Çakar

=== 2nd leg ===
16 April 1997 Final	Kocaelispor	1–0	Trabzonspor	İzmit, Turkey
20:00 EEST (UTC+03)	Nuri 85'			Stadium: İsmetpaşa Stadium; Referee: Muhittin Boşat

== See also ==
- 1996–97 1.Lig
