= Pierre Esser =

German footballer (born 1970)

Personal information
- Date of birth: 4 December 1970 (age 55)
- Place of birth: Germany
- Height: 1.89 m (6 ft 2 in)
- Position: Goalkeeper

Senior career*
Years	Team	Apps	(Gls)
199x–1994	Viktoria Köln		
1994–1996	Fortuna Düsseldorf	2	(0)
1996–1998	Galatasaray	1	(0)
1998–1999	Eintracht Trier	3	(0)
- * Club domestic league appearances and goals

Pierre Esser (Turkish: Cengiz Dülgeroğlu; born 4 December 1970) is a German former professional footballer who played as a goalkeeper.

== Career ==
Esser started his senior career with Viktoria Köln. In 1996, he signed for Galatasaray, where he made one appearance. After that, he played for German club Eintracht Trier before retiring in 1999.

He later worked as a financial service provider to footballers and as a player agent.
