= Bülent Kaan Bilgen =

Austrian footballer

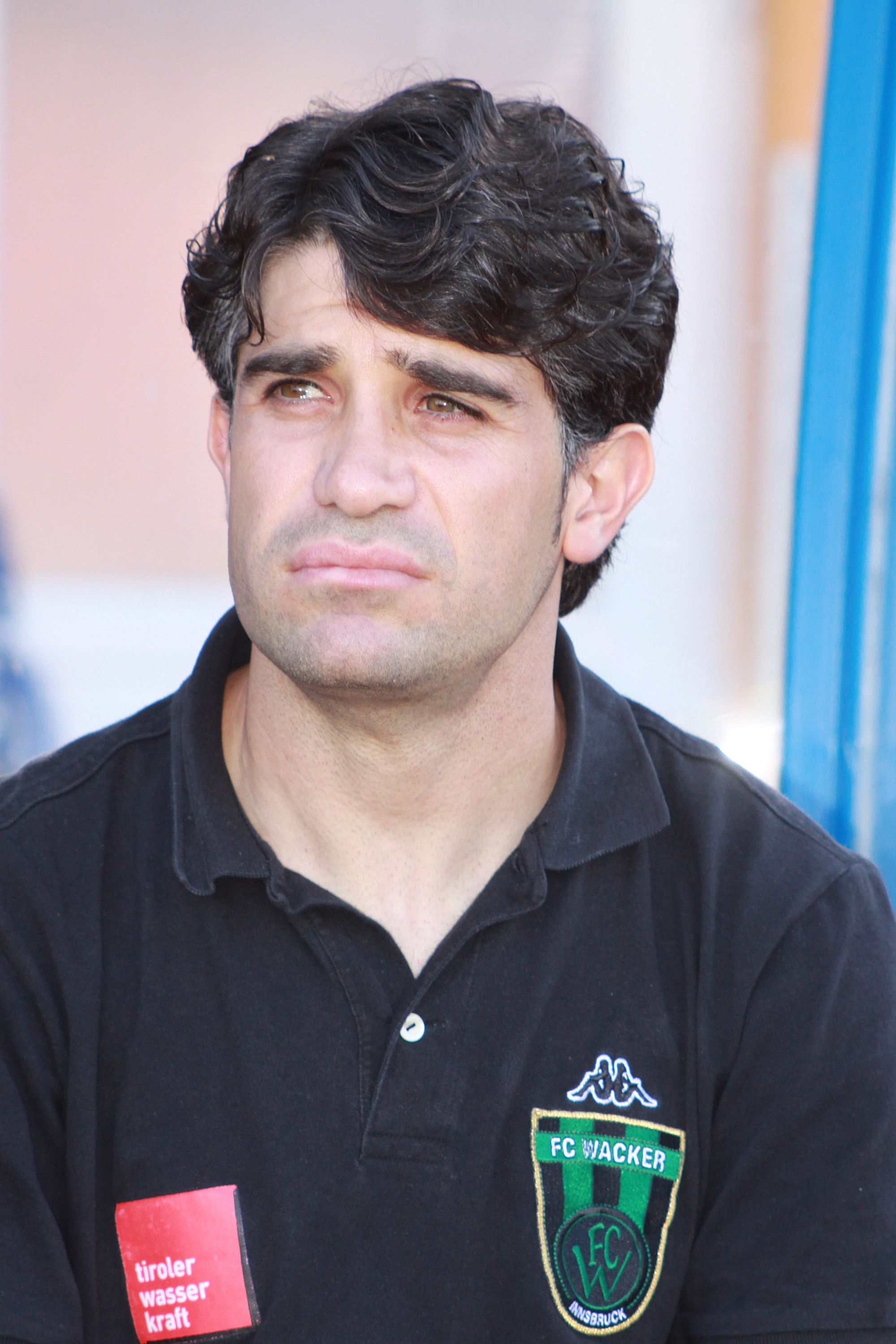

Personal information
- Date of birth: 5 April 1977 (age 49)
- Height: 1.70 m (5 ft 7 in)
- Position: Defender

Team information
- Current team: FC Union Innsbruck
- Number: 61

Youth career
- 1988–1997: SC Schwaz

Senior career*
Years	Team	Apps	(Gls)
1997–1999	FC Tirol Innsbruck	7	(1)
1999–2007	Kocaelispor	127	(3)
2007–2008	Körfez Belediyespor		
2008–2012	FC Wacker Innsbruck	11	(1)
2012–2014	SC Schwaz	9	(0)
2014–	FC Union Innsbruck	26	(8)
- * Club domestic league appearances and goals

Bülent Kaan Bilgen (born 5 April 1977) is an Austrian footballer who played for FC Union Innsbruck.

== Honours ==
- Kocaelispor
  - Turkish Cup (1): 2002
