= 2001–02 Süper Lig =

44th season of top-tier Turkish football

Süper Lig
- Season: 2001–02
- Champions: Galatasaray (15th title)
- Relegated: Çaykur Rizespor; Antalyaspor; Yozgatspor
- Champions League: Galatasaray; Fenerbahçe
- UEFA Cup: Beşiktaş; MKE Ankaragücü; Denizlispor; Kocaelispor
- Matches played: 306
- Goals scored: 910 (2.97 per match)
- Top goalscorer: İlhan Mansız; Arif Erdem (21 each)

The 2001–02 Süper Lig was the 44th edition of top-flight professional football in Turkey. Galatasaray S.K. became champions for the 15th time. Turkish First Football League was renamed as Turkish Super League in this season.

Turkey climbed from eleventh to seventh place in the UEFA association coefficient rankings at the end of the 2000–01 season, that means the league has gained additional two spots for the UEFA Cup and for the first time, the champions will now enter the group stage of the UEFA Champions League instead of having to compete in the qualifying rounds.

After beating cup winners Kocaelispor 4–0 at home last week, Denizlispor qualified for the first time to the UEFA Cup in their history.

== Final league table ==
Pos	Team	Pld	W	D	L	GF	GA	GD	Pts	Qualification or relegation
1	Galatasaray (C)	34	24	6	4	75	31	+44	78	Qualification to Champions League group stage
2	Fenerbahçe	34	24	3	7	70	31	+39	75	Qualification to Champions League third qualifying round
3	Beşiktaş	34	18	8	8	69	39	+30	62	Qualification to UEFA Cup first round
4	MKE Ankaragücü	34	15	8	11	72	58	+14	53	Qualification to UEFA Cup first round
5	Denizlispor	34	12	12	10	65	52	+13	48 (Note: Denizlispor were ahead of Gaziantepspor on head-to-head record: Denizlispor–Gaziantepspor 5–2, Gaziantepspor–Denizlispor 0–0.)	Qualification to UEFA Cup first round
6	Gaziantepspor	34	13	9	12	57	52	+5	48	
7	Göztepe A.Ş.	34	12	9	13	38	56	−18	45 (Note: Göztepe were ahead of Gençlerbirliği on head-to-head record: Göztepe–Gençlerbirliği 1–1, Gençlerbirliği–Göztepe 0–1.)	
8	Gençlerbirliği	34	11	12	11	47	51	−4	45	
9	İstanbulspor	34	12	8	14	33	38	−5	44 (Note: İstanbulspor were ahead of Bursaspor on head-to-head record: İstanbulspor–Bursaspor 3–0, Bursaspor–İstanbulspor 1–2.)	
10	Bursaspor	34	13	5	16	48	60	−12	44	
11	Kocaelispor	34	12	7	15	45	60	−15	43	Qualification to UEFA Cup first round (Note: Kocaelispor have won the 2001–02 Turkish Cup competition and thus are qualified for the first round of the UEFA Cup.)
12	Diyarbakırspor	34	10	10	14	41	50	−9	40 (Note: Diyarbakırspor were ahead of Malatyaspor and Trabzonspor on head-to-head points: Diyarbakırspor: 10 pts, Malatyaspor: 5 pts, Trabzonspor: 1 pts.)	
13	Malatyaspor	34	11	7	16	34	50	−16	40	
14	Trabzonspor	34	11	7	16	49	60	−11	40	
15	Samsunspor	34	10	8	16	32	43	−11	38	
16	Çaykur Rizespor (R)	34	9	10	15	43	51	−8	37 (Note: Çaykur Rizespor were ahead of Antalyaspor on head-to-head away goals scored: Çaykur Rizespor–Antalyaspor 1–1, Antalyaspor–Çaykur Rizespor 2–2.)	Relegation to Turkish Second League Category A
17	Antalyaspor (R)	34	9	10	15	46	61	−15	37	Relegation to Turkish Second League Category A
18	Yimpaş Yozgatspor (R)	34	6	9	19	46	67	−21	27	Relegation to Turkish Second League Category A

Rules for classification: 1) points; 2) goal difference; 3) number of goals scored.
(C) Champions; (R) Relegated

== Results ==
Home \ Away	ANT	BJK	BUR	ÇYR	DEN	DYB	FNB	GAL	GAZ	GEN	GÖZ	İST	KOC	MAL	AGÜ	SAM	TRA	YOZ
Antalyaspor		1–4	3–0	2–2	1–0	0–0	0–1	1–1	3–3	2–2	2–0	2–0	2–0	2–1	1–8	1–1	4–2	3–3
Beşiktaş	0–0		2–1	2–1	2–2	4–0	0–2	2–2	3–1	1–0	1–2	0–1	4–2	3–1	1–2	0–0	1–2	4–2
Bursaspor	0–1	2–2		1–0	3–3	2–1	0–1	5–0	0–2	0–1	0–0	1–2	2–1	1–0	2–1	2–1	2–2	3–1
Çaykur Rizespor	1–1	1–3	3–1		3–1	2–0	1–2	3–6	1–0	1–2	0–0	1–1	0–0	0–0	3–2	1–0	1–1	1–1
Denizlispor	3–2	3–3	0–0	1–2		2–1	1–2	1–1	5–2	4–1	2–1	1–1	4–0	4–1	3–4	4–1	2–1	5–0
Diyarbakırspor	3–1	0–0	2–3	1–0	3–0		2–1	0–0	2–3	1–2	1–2	1–0	1–1	0–0	2–1	1–1	3–1	1–1
Fenerbahçe	3–2	1–2	3–1	2–1	2–1	3–1		1–0	4–1	2–0	3–0	2–0	3–0	2–2	4–1	3–0	3–0	1–0
Galatasaray	2–1	1–0	2–1	4–1	1–0	5–1	2–0		2–0	3–1	4–1	4–1	5–1	1–0	2–0	2–0	3–1	5–0
Gaziantepspor	2–3	1–0	5–2	0–2	0–0	0–1	0–2	1–1		5–0	4–0	2–2	3–5	1–0	1–1	1–0	5–2	3–2
Gençlerbirliği	1–0	1–1	3–2	2–2	4–2	4–4	1–1	1–3	1–1		0–1	0–1	2–2	1–2	0–1	2–2	1–1	3–2
Göztepe	0–0	0–6	2–0	2–3	1–1	3–1	0–5	2–0	1–3	1–1		0–0	3–0	2–1	2–1	2–1	4–2	0–0
İstanbulspor	4–1	1–2	3–0	3–1	1–1	1–0	1–0	0–2	0–1	0–0	0–0		0–1	1–0	1–2	0–1	2–1	2–0
Kocaelispor	3–1	0–2	1–2	2–1	2–1	3–1	3–3	0–2	0–0	0–1	2–0	2–0		2–0	4–4	0–1	1–0	4–3
Malatyaspor	2–1	0–1	2–1	2–1	0–0	1–3	1–3	0–2	1–1	1–0	3–1	2–0	2–1		4–1	1–3	1–0	2–1
MKE Ankaragücü	2–0	3–4	0–1	1–1	1–1	1–1	3–2	2–1	1–1	2–5	4–2	4–2	2–0	6–0		2–0	4–2	1–1
Samsunspor	2–0	2–1	2–3	1–0	3–4	0–0	1–0	0–1	2–1	0–2	1–2	0–1	0–0	1–1	2–0		1–2	0–0
Trabzonspor	2–0	0–5	5–0	2–1	2–2	0–2	2–1	0–2	2–1	0–0	3–0	2–0	1–2	0–0	2–2	1–2		2–0
Yozgatspor	3–2	1–3	3–4	2–1	0–1	2–0	1–2	3–3	1–2	0–2	1–1	1–1	4–0	3–0	0–2	2–0	2–3	

Source: TFF, Mackolik
Legend: Blue = home team win; Yellow = draw; Red = away team win.

== Top scorers ==
Rank	Player	Club	Goals
1	(Turkey) İlhan Mansız	Beşiktaş	21
1	(Turkey) Arif Erdem	Galatasaray	21
3	(Ghana) Augustine Ahinful	Ankaragücü	19
4	(Turkey) Serhat Akın	Fenerbahçe	16
4	(Turkey) Veysel Cihan	Denizlispor	16
6	(Egypt) Ahmed Hassan	Gençlerbirliği	14
7	(Turkey) Okan Yılmaz	Bursaspor	13
7	(Ghana) Emmanuel Tetteh	Çaykur Rizespor	13
7	(Israel) Haim Revivo	Fenerbahçe	13
10	(Turkey) Fatih Tekke	Gaziantepspor	12
10	(Belarus) Maksim Romaschenko	Gaziantepspor	12
10	(Turkey) Ahmet Dursun	Beşiktaş	12
