= Faruk Yiğit =

Turkish footballer

Personal information
- Full name: Faruk Yiğit
- Date of birth: 15 April 1968 (age 58)
- Place of birth: Trabzon, Turkey
- Position: Striker

Youth career
- Yalovaspor

Senior career*
Years	Team	Apps	(Gls)
1986–1990	Yalovaspor		
1990–1992	Boluspor	56	(19)
1992–1997	Kocaelispor	137	(29)
1997–2001	Fenerbahçe	35	(7)
2000	→ Diyarbakırspor (loan)	2	(0)
2001–2002	Yalovaspor		
2005–2006	Orhangazi GB		

International career
1991–1996	Turkey	8	(1)
- * Club domestic league appearances and goals

Faruk Yiğit (born 15 April 1968 in Trabzon) is a Turkish former football player who played as a Striker.

He played for several clubs, including Orhangazi Gençlerbirliği, Yalovaspor, Boluspor, Kocaelispor, Fenerbahçe and Diyarbakırspor.

He played for Turkey national football team and was a participant at the 1996 UEFA European Championship.

== Honours ==
Kocaelispor

- Turkish Cup: 1997
