= Roman Dąbrowski =

Polish footballer (born 1972)

Personal information
- Full name: Roman Dąbrowski
- Date of birth: March 14, 1972 (age 54)
- Place of birth: Głuchołazy, Poland
- Height: 1.84 m (6 ft 0 in)
- Positions: Forward; winger

Senior career*
Years	Team	Apps	(Gls)
1988–1989	Czarni Otmuchów	7	(0)
1989–1990	Unia Krapkowice	11	(4)
1990–1994	Ruch Chorzów	89	(32)
1994–2002	Kocaelispor	225	(72)
2002–2005	Beşiktaş J.K	56	(5)
2005	Kocaelispor	9	(2)
2005–2006	Antalyaspor	17	(3)
2006–2007	Kocaelispor	15	(2)

International career
1994–2003	Poland	5	(0)

Managerial career
- 2008: Kocaelispor A2
- 2008–2009: Kocaelispor (assistant coach)
- 2009: Kocaelispor
- 2010: Kocaelispor (assistant coach)
- 2011–2012: Beşiktaş J.K. Football Academy
- 2012–2013: Orhangazispor
- 2015: 41 Futbol Kulübü
- 2015–2018: 41 Futbol Kulübü (assistant coach)
- * Club domestic league appearances and goals

Roman Dąbrowski (born 14 March 1972) is a Polish former professional footballer.

== Honours ==
Kocaelispor

- Turkish Cup: 1996–97, 2001–02

Beşiktaş J.K.

- Süper Lig: 2002–03
