= Silopi Cudispor =

Turkish sports club

- Full name: Si̇lopi̇ Cudi̇spor
- Ground: Si̇lopi̇ İlçe, Şirnak
- Capacity: 1000
- League: Bölgesel Amatör Lig

Si̇lopi̇ Cudi̇spor is a Turkish sports club based in Şirnak near Diyarbakır, mainly concentrated on football.

Sidespor is currently playing in the Turkish Regional Amateur League.

== Stadium ==
As of the 2016–2017 season, the team plays at the 1000-person capacity Si̇lopi̇ İlçe stadium.

== League participations ==
- TFF Second League: 2002–2003
- TFF Third League: 1998–2002, 2003–?
- Turkish Amateur Football Leagues
- Turkish Regional Amateur League: 2016–2017
