= Kocaelispor =

Turkish professional football club

- Full name: Kocaelispor Kulübü
- Nickname: Körfez (The Gulf)
- Founded: 24 April 1966; 60 years ago
- Stadium: Kocaeli Stadium
- Capacity: 34,829
- Coordinates: 40°46′29″N 30°01′03″E
- President: Recep Durul
- Head coach: Selçuk İnan
- League: Süper Lig
- 2025–26: Süper Lig, 10th of 18
- Website: kocaelispor.com.tr
| Home colours | Away colours | Third colours |

Kocaelispor (Turkish pronunciation: [kod͡ʒaˈelispoɾ], lit. 'Kocaeli Sports Club') is a professional football club based in İzmit, Kocaeli Province, Turkey. Founded in 1966, the club competes in the Süper Lig, the highest tier of the Turkish football league system, and plays home matches at the 34,829-seat Kocaeli Stadium. The traditional colours of the team are green and black.

Kocaelispor has had several top-flight spells, most notably from 1980 to 1988, 1992 to 2003, and in the 2008–09 season. Their best league finish was fourth in the 1992–93 season. The club has won the Turkish Cup twice, in 1997 and 2002, and has participated in European competition.

Nicknamed Körfez (The Gulf), the club has a strong following in İzmit and the surrounding Kocaeli region. Its fiercest rivalries are with Sakaryaspor and Gebzespor.

After financial collapse and successive relegations in the 2010s, Kocaelispor dropped into the amateur leagues. A rebuilding process led to successive promotions, culminating in a return to the Süper Lig in the 2024–25 season after a 16-year absence.

== History ==
=== Foundation and Early Years (1957–1980) ===
The roots of Kocaelispor go back to the late 1950s. In 1957, representatives of local side Baçspor petitioned the İzmit municipality for a dedicated training ground. Then-mayor Osman Gencal, himself a former athlete and Baçspor member, supported the project and oversaw the allocation of a 28-acre municipal plot in Baç for sporting use.

By the early 1960s Baçspor had redeveloped the area and in 1964 proposed forming a fully professional team to apply to the national second tier (2. Lig). At the time the federation’s regulations required a composite club structure with adequate facilities and staff, and encouraged local mergers to concentrate resources. In 1966 three İzmit clubs—Baçspor, İzmit Gençlik and Doğanspor—agreed to unite under a single umbrella; at a joint congress the name Kocaelispor was adopted and green–black were chosen as the club colours. The new board launched a subscription campaign that raised an initial budget reportedly around 175,000 lira to build the first squad and meet entry requirements for national competition.

Kocaelispor were admitted to the 1. Lig for the 1966–67 season and quickly became the region’s flagship representative in Turkish professional football. The club earned a first-ever promotion to the Süper Lig (top flight) in 1980, remaining at that level for eight consecutive seasons during the 1980s. After relegation battles and disputed disciplinary rulings in the late 1980s, Kocaelispor’s league status was the subject of appeals that culminated in a decision by the Council of State affecting relegation procedures; the club subsequently returned to the top tier during that period following the legal process.

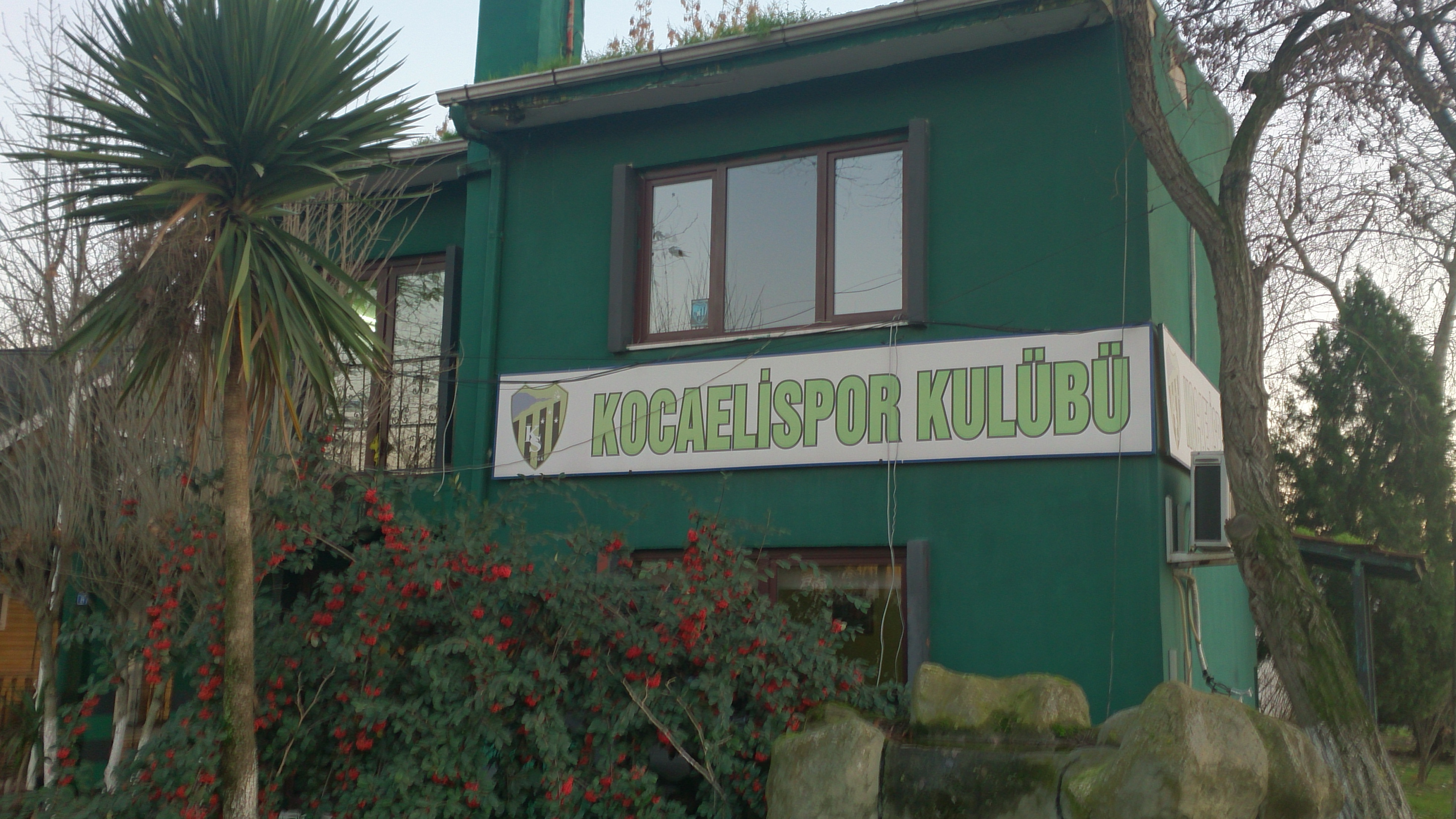
Kocaelispor former club building

=== The “Legendary Squad” and first European campaign (1992–93) ===
Back in the top division after promotion in 1991–92, Kocaelispor opened the 1992–93 1. Lig at full throttle under coach Güvenç Kurtar. On opening day they beat Kayserispor 7–2 in İzmit, a result widely reported as a statement of intent. Through the autumn the “Kocaeli fırtınası” put together a long unbeaten run and finished the first half among the leaders; a spring dip cost a podium place, but the team still recorded the club’s best top-flight finish to that date (4th) and qualified for Europe. That league placing earned a berth in the 1993–94 UEFA Cup, the first European campaign in Kocaelispor history.

Kurtar’s side blended a Balkan-school defensive spine with quick, vertical transitions. In goal, former Yugoslavia international Fahrudin Omerović provided commanding shot-stopping and organization after his 1992 summer move. At centre-back, Stevica Kuzmanovski and Mirko Mirković—who later took Turkish citizenship as Mert Meriç—formed a robust pairing noted for aerial strength and tight marking.

Up front, academy product Bülent Uygun partnered Saffet Sancaklı, creating one of the league’s most direct and productive forward lines; contemporaneous reports highlighted Uygun’s second-ball finishing and Sancaklı’s runs in behind as core patterns of Kurtar’s narrow 4-4-2. Sancaklı’s subsequent moves to Galatasaray and Fenerbahçe were framed as a natural step after his İzmit breakthrough. With contributors such as Bülent Baturman, Halil İbrahim Kara, Melih Erdem and Ergun Kula, the side set club records for top-flight wins and goals at the time.

The fourth-place finish secured Europe and fixed the 1992–93 squad in local memory as the “efsane kadro” (legendary roster). The momentum carried into the following autumn’s UEFA Cup, confirming the step-change in the club’s stature.

=== Successes, relegations, and fall to the amateur leagues (1995–2015) ===
Building on a top-five league finish in the 1995–96 campaign, Kocaelispor qualified for the summer UEFA Intertoto Cup, which—at the time offered additional paths into European competition. İzmit’s side treated the July fixtures as a continuation of their domestic momentum, drawing strong crowds at İzmit İsmetpaşa and recording competitive results against continental opposition before bowing out in the latter stages of the programme.

The club’s breakthrough arrived the following season in the national cup. Under the guidance of coach Güvenç Kurtar, Kocaelispor navigated a demanding bracket in the Turkish Cup, dispatching several top-flight opponents en route to the final and leaning on a compact defensive shape and rapid transitions that became the hallmark of the side. In the two-legged 1997 final they defeated Trabzonspor on aggregate, winning the club’s first major national trophy and earning a berth in European competition for the following season. The triumph was widely viewed as a landmark for Kocaelispor, validating a player-recruitment strategy that blended experienced domestic names with rising talents from the Yugoslav football school already on the roster.

Kocaelispor won its second 2002 Turkish Cup Final, defeating Beşiktaş by a wide margin. The match remains one of the most notable finals in the competition's history. Reports from the time emphasized the team's tactical flexibility and the vocal backing of İzmit supporters, which were seen as contributing factors to the victory.

Each cup victory carried a continental dividend. The 1997 success delivered European qualification under the then-existing format, while the 2002 title secured a place in the early rounds of the UEFA competition of the following season, giving Kocaelispor international exposure and revenue. More broadly, the victories led to Kocaelispor’s most successful period: they cemented the club’s reputation as one of the few sides outside the traditional Istanbul trio capable of lifting major silverware in the modern era, and they remain central to Kocaelispor's institutional identity and supporter culture today.

These victories remain historic milestones for the club and its supporters. However, following the 2002–03 season, Kocaelispor was relegated after finishing last in the Süper Lig. After spending five seasons in the TFF First League, they won the 2007–08 championship and earned promotion back to the Süper Lig. This return lasted only one season due to financial difficulties, and the club was relegated again after losing 3–1 at home to Trabzonspor on 9 May 2009 in Round 31, finishing 17th. The following season, after a 2–1 away defeat to Kartalspor on 4 April 2010, Kocaelispor was relegated to the TFF Second League, the third tier of Turkish football.

During the 2007–08 campaign Kocaelispor used three head coaches Fuat Yaman, Kayhan Çubuklu and Engin İpekoğlu yet still clinched the 1. Lig title and a return to the Süper Lig. A severe financial squeeze and squad turnover, however, triggered back-to-back relegations: first from the top flight in 2008–09, and then to the TFF Second League after the 2010–11 season. Finishing bottom of the Second League White Group in 2011–12 pushed the club down again — to the fourth tier — and, after protracted off-field problems, Kocaelispor fell into the Turkish Regional Amateur League in April 2014 following a 1–0 defeat to İstanbulspor with four rounds remaining.

In the 2014–15 Regional Amateur League season Kocaelispor battled promotion rivals including Tekirdağspor, Çengelköyspor and Arnavutköy Belediyespor, but despite a long spell at the summit finished 4th in Group 11. The following season brought a decisive turnaround: Kocaelispor won their group and then defeated Sultangazispor 2–0 in a neutral-venue promotion play-off at Eskişehir on 24 April 2016 — goals from Sinan Pektemek and Hamza Mutlu sealing a long-awaited rise back to the professional pyramid (TFF 3. Lig).

=== Return to the professional leagues (2016–present) ===
Promoted from the Regional Amateur League in April 2016, Kocaelispor restarted life in the 3. Lig in 2016–17. They finished 4th in their group but fell short in the promotion play-offs, remaining in the division; the following season (2017–18) brought a mid-table 13th-place finish. In 2018–19 Kocaelispor climbed to 2nd in their group but again could not secure promotion via the play-offs.

The pandemic-affected 2019–20 season was curtailed with Kocaelispor leading their 3. Lig group; the TFF confirmed group leaders would be promoted, sending the club up to the 2. Lig for 2020–21. Momentum continued in 2020–21: Kocaelispor finished 3rd in the 2. Lig Kırmızı Grup and won the promotion play-offs — defeating Sakaryaspor 4–0 in the final to return to the 1. Lig after a single year.

The step up proved difficult: in 2021–22 Kocaelispor finished 16th in the 1. Lig and were relegated back to the 2. Lig. The response was emphatic: in 2022–23 the club won their 2. Lig group to clinch immediate promotion back to the second tier. Back in the 1. Lig for 2023–24, Kocaelispor closed the season in 6th place and qualified for the promotion play-offs, where their campaign ended short of a top-flight return.

In the 2024–25 season, Kocaelispor’s long push back to the top tier finally came to fruition. Under head coach İsmet Taşdemir (appointed in late December 2024), the side put together a sustained spring run that kept them clear at the top of the Trendyol 1. Lig. On a weekend late in April, one day before Kocaelispor were due to visit Esenler Erokspor, Fatih Karagümrük’s 1–0 home defeat to Boluspor meant the İzmit club could no longer be caught, mathematically guaranteeing an automatic-promotion place with three matchdays remaining; the club confirmed promotion to the Süper Lig after a 16-year absence.

Beyond securing promotion early, season metrics published by the TFF showed Kocaelispor among the league’s top sides for goal difference and away points, while home fixtures at Kocaeli Stadium regularly drew five-figure gates during the run-in, underscoring the scale of the club’s return to the elite.

== Crest and colors ==
Kocaelispor's crest features a traditional shield shape with vertical black and green stripes, which represent the club's official colors — green and black. Prominently displayed in the center are the intertwined white initials "K" and "S", standing for Kocaelispor, along with the club's founding year 1966 at the bottom.

In the upper left corner of the crest, a blue silhouette represents the Gulf of İzmit (İzmit Körfezi), symbolizing the city's connection to the sea. Adjacent to it is a yellow sun, symbolizing energy and hope. On the right side of the crest, three yellow stars are aligned diagonally, typically symbolizing achievements and aspirations of the club. The green and black color scheme has been consistently used by the club since its founding, with green symbolizing nature and vitality, and black representing determination and strength.

== Supporters ==
Kocaelispor commands one of the most dedicated provincial followings in Turkey. Its core ultra collective, Hodri Meydan, was founded in 1989 as the successor to the “Çılgınlar” and “Eski Tüfekler” crews; the name was borrowed from journalist Uğur Dündar’s TV debate programme while supporters were travelling to a Bartınspor away match, and the group has occupied the Maraton stand ever since. Academic work on the club shows that even when Kocaelispor slid into the amateur divisions identification among local fans remained “high,” making the club a textbook case of civic loyalty over glory-hunting. That loyalty translates into gates most top-flight teams would envy: in the 2024–25 1. Lig season Kocaelispor drew 246 898 ticket-paying spectators at an average of 13 716 per home game, the highest in the division. The fan base extends well beyond İzmit, with sizeable pockets across the wider Marmara and Black Sea regions. Match-day culture revolves around continuous ninety-minute chanting, industrial drums, large-format tifos and the slogan “Burası Hodri Meydan,” all presented in the club’s green and black colours. The group has also shown a capacity for self-policing: after member Serhat Boz was murdered en route to an Altay fixture in March 2017, Hodri Meydan voluntarily withdrew from the terraces for the remainder of the campaign and issued a public apology to the city, citing fatigue with violence. Their fiercest enmity remains the regional clash with Sakaryaspor, known as the Marmara or Gulf Derby, which has produced some of the collective’s most elaborate choreographies and occasional unrest.

== Rivalry with Sakaryaspor ==
The Marmara Derby—also known as the Gulf Derby or, colloquially, the Green-Black Derby—is the football rivalry between Kocaelispor and Sakaryaspor, two neighbouring clubs from the provinces of Kocaeli and Sakarya. It has been regarded as the most significant fixture for both teams since their first official meeting on 6 January 1974, which ended in a 1–0 victory for Sakaryaspor in Adapazarı. As of 2025, the two clubs have faced each other in 42 competitive matches, with Sakaryaspor leading the series with 17 wins to Kocaelispor’s 15, along with 10 draws. The largest margin of victory belongs to Kocaelispor, who won 6–2 on 8 March 1992.

The clash between Kocaelispor and Sakaryaspor occurs because of the proximity of the two Gulf cities, which are 50 kilometers apart, and the strong hostility between the fans of the teams, Hodri Meydan and Tatangalar. Every match between the two teams is classified as risky by the security agencies in Turkey’s because of constant confrontations. The clash has been witnessed in numerous matches, including one played on May 8, 2011, where Gökhan Bozkaya of Kocaelispor decided to make an own goal in order to avoid a 4–1 score line that matches Kocaeli's "41" license plate code number. An earthquake relief friendly match on February 22, 2023, saw fans tampering with their flags and employing fireworks even when the funds raised were to be channeled to AFAD and the Red Crescent. The recent matches have been Kocaelispor's away match on November 10, 2024, and their home match against Sakarya on March 31, 2025.

== Stadium ==
For more than four decades Kocaelispor played at the centrally located İzmit İsmetpaşa Stadium, a municipal ground inaugurated in 1974. After periodic safety and seating works its official capacity settled at around 12,700, and the venue hosted the club through its 1. Lig and Süper Lig eras until the mid-2010s, as well as numerous regional and youth fixtures. Demolition of the ageing ground began in 2018 as part of an urban-renewal scheme once the new stadium project was delivered, bringing an end to one of İzmit’s longest-serving sports venues.

Kocaelispor subsequently relocated to the new Kocaeli Stadium (often referred to as İzmit Stadyumu), a purpose-built, all-seater arena in the Alikahya neighbourhood roughly 7 km from the İzmit city centre. Designed and delivered under the national stadium programme, the facility provides approximately 34,000 seats in a continuous lower–upper bowl with a full roof canopy and modern matchday/operational spaces, and is built to meet UEFA and Süper Lig requirements. The club completed its move during the 2017–18 period as the venue came on stream, with official opening events and early fixtures staged in 2018.

Access to Kocaeli Stadium is provided by arterial roads linking the D-605 corridor as well as dedicated matchday bus services arranged by the Kocaeli Metropolitan Municipality, with on-site parking and segregated turnstile zones integrated into the footprint.

== Statistics ==
=== Results of League and Cup Competitions by Season ===
| Season | League table | | | | | | | | | | Turkish Cup | UEFA | Top scorer | |
| Season | League | Pos | P | W | D | L | GF | GA | GD | Pts | Turkish Cup | UEFA | Player | Goals |
|---|---|---|---|---|---|---|---|---|---|---|---|---|---|---|
| 1966–67 | 1. Lig | 7th | 30 | 12 | 9 | 9 | 39 | 30 | 9 | 33 | R2 | DNQ | Ahmet Asena | 12 |
| 1967–68 | 1. Lig | 7th | 38 | 17 | 8 | 13 | 50 | 40 | 10 | 42 | ~~N/A.~~ | DNQ | Ahmet Asena | 9 |
| 1968–69 | 1. Lig | 7th | 34 | 14 | 9 | 11 | 37 | 30 | 7 | 37 | ~~N/A.~~ | DNQ | İbrahim Yazıcıoğlu | 9 |
| 1969–70 | 1. Lig | 10th | 30 | 9 | 8 | 13 | 26 | 35 | −9 | 26 | ~~N/A.~~ | DNQ | Cevat Öznalçın | 9 |
| 1970–71 | 1. Lig | 11th | 30 | 10 | 7 | 13 | 24 | 28 | −4 | 27 | ~~N/A.~~ | DNQ | İbrahim Yazıcıoğlu | 6 |
| 1971–72 | 1. Lig | 9th | 30 | 11 | 7 | 12 | 22 | 32 | −10 | 29 | ~~N/A.~~ | DNQ | Zeki Melen | 5 |
| 1972–73 | 1. Lig | 11th | 30 | 10 | 7 | 13 | 24 | 23 | 1 | 27 | ~~N/A.~~ | DNQ | Zeki Melen | 6 |
| 1973–74 | 1. Lig | 9th | 30 | 11 | 8 | 11 | 37 | 27 | 10 | 30 | ~~N/A.~~ | DNQ | Hayri Kara | 7 |
| 1974–75 | 1. Lig | 4th | 30 | 12 | 9 | 9 | 27 | 23 | 4 | 33 | ~~N/A.~~ | DNQ | ~~N/A.~~ | ~~N/A.~~ |
| 1975–76 | 1. Lig | 7th | 30 | 12 | 7 | 11 | 32 | 32 | 0 | 31 | R3 | DNQ | ~~N/A.~~ | ~~N/A.~~ |
| 1976–77 | 1. Lig | 4th | 30 | 12 | 9 | 9 | 35 | 25 | 10 | 33 | SF | DNQ | ~~N/A.~~ | ~~N/A.~~ |
| 1977–78 | 1. Lig | 4th | 32 | 13 | 11 | 8 | 37 | 25 | 12 | 37 | R2 | DNQ | Raşit Çetiner | 16 |
| 1978–79 | 1. Lig | 5th | 30 | 13 | 7 | 10 | 41 | 42 | −1 | 33 | SF | DNQ | ~~N/A.~~ | ~~N/A.~~ |
| 1979–80 | 1. Lig | 1st↑ | 30 | 20 | 5 | 5 | 53 | 20 | 33 | 45 | R3 | DNQ | ~~N/A.~~ | ~~N/A.~~ |
| 1980–81 | Süper Lig | 8th | 30 | 11 | 8 | 11 | 34 | 32 | 2 | 30 | R6 | DNQ | Güvenç Kurtar | 8 |
| 1981–82 | Süper Lig | 10th | 32 | 10 | 12 | 10 | 36 | 31 | 5 | 32 | QF | DNQ | Orhan Görsen | 8 |
| 1982–83 | Süper Lig | 9th | 34 | 10 | 13 | 11 | 34 | 37 | −3 | 33 | R5 | DNQ | Senad Ibrić | 8 |
| 1983–84 | Süper Lig | 8th | 34 | 11 | 10 | 13 | 35 | 32 | 3 | 32 | R5 | DNQ | Mustafa Pakyürekli | 6 |
| 1984–85 | Süper Lig | 7th | 34 | 11 | 12 | 11 | 30 | 31 | −1 | 34 | R4 | DNQ | Haluk Turfan | — |
| 1985–86 | Süper Lig | 14th | 36 | 12 | 8 | 16 | 37 | 47 | −10 | 32 | R4 | DNQ | Senad Ibrić | 9 |
| 1986–87 | Süper Lig | 16th | 36 | 10 | 11 | 15 | 39 | 50 | −11 | 31 | R6 | DNQ | Orhan Görsen | 11 |
| 1987–88 | Süper Lig | 18th↓ | 38 | 6 | 16 | 16 | 44 | 61 | −17 | 34 | QF | DNQ | Engelbert Buschmann | 15 |
| 1988–89 | 1. Lig | 7th | 34 | 15 | 5 | 14 | 40 | 38 | 2 | 50 | R4 | DNQ | Senai Kara | 8 |
| 1989–90 | 1. Lig | 14th | 32 | 9 | 12 | 11 | 33 | 31 | 2 | 39 | R1 | DNQ | Sefer Yılmaz | 10 |
| 1990–91 | 1. Lig | 2nd | 34 | 22 | 7 | 5 | 49 | 18 | 31 | 73 | R1 | DNQ | Yaşar Altıntaş | 14 |
| 1991–92 | 1. Lig | 1st↑ | 34 | 25 | 8 | 1 | 89 | 24 | 65 | 83 | SF | DNQ | Saffet Sancaklı | 30 |
| 1992–93 | Süper Lig | 4th | 30 | 17 | 8 | 5 | 56 | 30 | 26 | 59 | QF | DNQ | Ergun Kula | 19 |
| 1993–94 | Süper Lig | 6th | 30 | 14 | 6 | 10 | 44 | 45 | −1 | 48 | SF | R1 | Saffet Sancaklı | 24 |
| 1994–95 | Süper Lig | 9th | 34 | 12 | 8 | 14 | 57 | 60 | −3 | 44 | QF | DNQ | Faruk Yiğit | 13 |
| 1995–96 | Süper Lig | 5th | 34 | 16 | 11 | 7 | 61 | 43 | 18 | 59 | R6 | DNQ | Saffet Sancaklı | 14 |
| 1996–97 | Süper Lig | 7th | 34 | 12 | 12 | 10 | 37 | 35 | 2 | 48 | W | GS | Roman Dąbrowski | 11 |
| 1997–98 | Süper Lig | 10th | 34 | 12 | 7 | 15 | 46 | 46 | 0 | 43 | SF | R2 | Ahmet Dursun | 10 |
| 1998–99 | Süper Lig | 5th | 34 | 14 | 8 | 12 | 44 | 37 | 7 | 50 | QF | DNQ | Orhan Kaynak | 8 |
| 1999–00 | Süper Lig | 12th | 34 | 11 | 7 | 16 | 44 | 58 | −14 | 40 | R4 | R3 | Roman Dąbrowski | 15 |
| 2000–01 | Süper Lig | 13th | 34 | 10 | 11 | 13 | 56 | 60 | −4 | 41 | QF | R1 | Serdar Topraktepe | 16 |
| 2001–02 | Süper Lig | 11th | 34 | 12 | 7 | 15 | 45 | 60 | −15 | 43 | W | DNQ | Kwame Ayew | 11 |
| 2002–03 | Süper Lig | 18th↓ | 34 | 6 | 4 | 24 | 32 | 66 | −34 | 22 | QF | R1 | Hüseyin Karakayış | 8 |
| 2003–04 | 1. Lig | 5th | 34 | 16 | 9 | 9 | 54 | 44 | 10 | 57 | R2 | DNQ | Engin Öztonga | 16 |
| 2004–05 | 1. Lig | 5th | 34 | 17 | 11 | 6 | 49 | 28 | 21 | 62 | R2 | DNQ | Engin Öztonga | 17 |
| 2005–06 | 1. Lig | 9th | 34 | 11 | 12 | 11 | 41 | 41 | 0 | 45 | R2 | DNQ | Özgür Karakaya | 13 |
| 2006–07 | 1. Lig | 11th | 34 | 9 | 15 | 10 | 42 | 45 | −3 | 42 | R1 | DNQ | Mehmet Kahriman | 7 |
| 2007–08 | 1. Lig | 1st↑ | 34 | 19 | 7 | 8 | 59 | 37 | 22 | 64 | R1 | DNQ | Taner Gülleri | 21 |
| 2008–09 | Süper Lig | 17th↓ | 34 | 8 | 5 | 21 | 47 | 73 | −26 | 29 | R2 | DNQ | Taner Gülleri | 19 |
| 2009–10 | 1. Lig | 18th↓ | 34 | 2 | 8 | 24 | 23 | 66 | −43 | 14 | R2 | DNQ | Serdar Topraktepe | 8 |
| 2010–11 | 2. Lig | 12th | 34 | 10 | 15 | 9 | 39 | 41 | −2 | 39 | R2 | DNQ | Ali Bayraktar | 9 |
| 2011–12 | 2. Lig | 17th↓ | 32 | 2 | 3 | 27 | 30 | 130 | −100 | 9 | N/A | DNQ | Doğan Karakuş | 16 |
| 2012–13 | 3. Lig | 14th | 34 | 11 | 7 | 16 | 44 | 60 | −16 | 37 | R3 | DNQ | Doğan Karakuş | 23 |
| 2013–14 | 3. Lig | 17th↓ | 34 | 9 | 1 | 24 | 37 | 73 | −36 | 28 | R2 | DNQ | Melih Ahmet Kaçar | 8 |
| 2014–15 | Amateur | 4th | 24 | 13 | 6 | 5 | 35 | 22 | 13 | 45 | DNQ | DNQ | Sinan Pektemek | 9 |
| 2015–16 | Amateur | 1st↑ | 24 | 18 | 3 | 3 | 55 | 19 | 36 | 57 | DNQ | DNQ | Sinan Pektemek | 13 |
| 2016–17 | 3. Lig | 4th | 36 | 16 | 13 | 7 | 55 | 35 | 20 | 61 | R1 | DNQ | Sinan Pektemek | 13 |
| 2017–18 | 3. Lig | 13th | 34 | 9 | 13 | 12 | 35 | 42 | −7 | 40 | R3 | DNQ | Burak Süleyman | 9 |
| 2018–19 | 3. Lig | 2nd | 34 | 17 | 7 | 10 | 40 | 31 | 9 | 58 | R3 | DNQ | Burak Süleyman | 12 |
| 2019–20 | 3. Lig | 1st↑ | 27 | 21 | 1 | 5 | 56 | 22 | 34 | 64 | R3 | DNQ | Yakup Alkan | 14 |
| 2020–21 | 2. Lig | 3rd↑ | 36 | 20 | 8 | 8 | 59 | 32 | 27 | 68 | R5 | DNQ | Benhur Keser | 13 |
| 2021–22 | 1. Lig | 16th↓ | 36 | 12 | 8 | 16 | 40 | 49 | −9 | 44 | R5 | DNQ | Benhur Keser | 9 |
| 2022–23 | 2. Lig | 1st↑ | 38 | 25 | 9 | 4 | 73 | 28 | 45 | 84 | R2 | DNQ | Samed Kaya | 15 |
| 2023–24 | 1. Lig | 6th | 34 | 16 | 7 | 11 | 48 | 41 | 7 | 55 | R4 | DNQ | Douglas Tanque | 10 |
| 2024–25 | 1. Lig | 1st↑ | 38 | 21 | 9 | 8 | 68 | 41 | 27 | 72 | GS | DNQ | Oğulcan Çağlayan | 22 |
| 2025–26 | Süper Lig | 10th | 34 | 9 | 10 | 15 | 26 | 38 | -12 | 37 | GS | DNQ | Bruno Petković | 7 |
| 2026-27 | Süper Lig | TBD | | | | | | | | | | | | |

=== League participations ===
- Süper Lig: 1980–88, 1992–2003, 2008–09, 2025–
- 1. Lig: 1966–1980, 1988–92, 2003–08, 2009–10, 2021–22, 2023–25
- 2. Lig: 2010–12, 2020–21, 2022–23
- 3. Lig: 2012–14, 2016–20
- Amateur League: 2014–16

== Honours ==
- Turkish Cup
  - Winners (2): 1996–97, 2001–02
- 1. Lig
  - Winners (4): 1979–80, 1991–92, 2007–08, 2024–25
- 2. Lig
  - Winners (1): 2022–23
  - Promotion (1): 2020–21
- 3. Lig
  - Winners (1): 2019–20
- Amateur League
  - Winners (1): 2015–16

== Kocaelispor in Europe ==
Kocaelispor is one of the Turkish clubs that has represented Turkey in European competitions organized by UEFA. The club has played a total of 18 matches in European competitions: 4 matches in the UEFA Cup (now known as the UEFA Europa League), 4 matches in the UEFA Cup Winners' Cup, and 10 matches in the UEFA Intertoto Cup. In these matches, Kocaelispor recorded 5 wins, 5 draws, and 8 losses, scoring 15 goals and conceding 23.

=== Summary ===
| Competition | Pld | W | D | L | GF | GA | GD |
|---|---|---|---|---|---|---|---|
| UEFA Cup Winners' Cup | 4 | 2 | 1 | 1 | 4 | 2 | +2 |
| UEFA Cup | 4 | 0 | 1 | 3 | 0 | 7 | –7 |
| UEFA Intertoto Cup | 10 | 3 | 3 | 4 | 11 | 14 | –3 |
| Total | 18 | 5 | 5 | 8 | 15 | 23 | –8 |

=== Results ===
| Season | Competition | Round | Club | Home | Away | Aggregate |
|---|---|---|---|---|---|---|
| 1993–94 | UEFA Cup | R1 | (Portugal) Sporting CP | 0–0 | 0–2 | 0–2 |
| 1996 | UEFA Intertoto Cup | Group 11 | (Russia) Uralmash | —N/a | 0–2 | 4th |
| 1996 | UEFA Intertoto Cup | Group 11 | (Bulgaria) CSKA Sofia | 1–3 | —N/a | 4th |
| 1996 | UEFA Intertoto Cup | Group 11 | (France) Strasbourg | —N/a | 1–1 | 4th |
| 1996 | UEFA Intertoto Cup | Group 11 | (Malta) Hibernians | 5–3 | —N/a | 4th |
| 1997–98 | Cup Winners' Cup | R1 | (Romania) Național București | 2–0 | 1–0 | 3–0 |
| 1997–98 | Cup Winners' Cup | R2 | (Russia) Lokomotiv Moscow | 0–0 | 1–2 | 1–2 |
| 1999 | UEFA Intertoto Cup | R2 | (Latvia) Ventspils | 2–0 | 1–1 | 3–1 |
| 1999 | UEFA Intertoto Cup | R3 | (Germany) MSV Duisburg | 0–3 | 0–0 | 0–3 |
| 2000 | UEFA Intertoto Cup | R1 | (Lithuania) FK Atlantas | 0–1 | 1–0 | 1–1 (4–5 p) |
| 2002–03 | UEFA Cup | R1 | (Hungary) Ferencváros | 0–1 | 0–4 | 0–5 |

=== UEFA Ranking history ===
| Season | Rank | Points | Ref. |
|---|---|---|---|
| 1994 | 168 ▲ | 0.500 | |
| 1995 | 177 ▼ | 0.500 | |
| 1996 | 193 ▼ | 0.500 | |
| 1997 | 188 ▲ | 0.500 | |
| 1998 | 104 ▲ | 1.750 | |
| 1999 | 142 ▼ | 15.175 | |
| 2000 | 127 ▲ | 16.925 | |
| 2001 | 117 ▲ | 19.987 | |
| 2002 | 126 ▼ | 19.362 | |

As of 2002

== Players ==
=== Current squad ===
As of 4 September 2026

Note: Flags indicate national team as defined under FIFA eligibility rules; some limited exceptions apply. Players may hold more than one non-FIFA nationality.

| No. | Pos. | Nation | Player |
|---|---|---|---|
| 1 | GK | SRB | Aleksandar Jovanović |
| 2 | DF | SUR | Anfernee Dijksteel |
| 3 | DF | TUR | Muharrem Cinan |
| 4 | DF | FRA | Tanguy Zoukrou (on loan from Young Boys) |
| 5 | DF | TUR | Emir Ortakaya |
| 6 | DF | CRO | Matej Maglica |
| 7 | FW | GHA | Dan Agyei |
| 8 | MF | NOR | Tobias Gulliksen (on loan from Rapid Wien) |
| 9 | FW | CRO | Bruno Petković (captain) |
| 10 | MF | TUR | Berkan Kutlu |
| 11 | FW | POR | Gonçalo Sousa (on loan from FC Porto B) |
| 14 | MF | ANG | Show |
| 17 | FW | TUR | Arda Özyar |
| 18 | MF | TUR | Hulusi Destici |
| 19 | MF | TUR | Haydar Karataş |

| No. | Pos. | Nation | Player |
|---|---|---|---|
| 20 | MF | ESP | Mahamadou Susoho |
| 21 | DF | MLI | Massadio Haïdara |
| 22 | DF | TUR | Uğur Kaan Yıldız |
| 23 | GK | TUR | Onurcan Piri |
| 26 | FW | TUR | Metehan Altunbaş |
| 27 | MF | TUR | Ege Bilim |
| 32 | MF | GER | Makana Baku |
| 41 | DF | TUR | Onur Öztonga |
| 75 | MF | TUR | Tayfur Bingöl |
| 83 | GK | TUR | Serhat Öztaşdelen |
| 89 | MF | TUR | Bedirhan Yıldız |
| 97 | FW | FRA | Florian Ayé |
| 98 | GK | TUR | Talha Polat |
| 99 | FW | HON | Rigoberto Rivas |

=== Out on loan ===
Note: Flags indicate national team as defined under FIFA eligibility rules; some limited exceptions apply. Players may hold more than one non-FIFA nationality.

| No. / Pos. / Nation / Player; — / DF / TUR / Muhammed Efe Küçük (at Yalova FK 77 SK until 30 June 2027) | No. / Pos. / Nation / Player; — / FW / TUR / Bünyamin Dalkılıç (at Yalova FK 77 SK until 30 June 2027) |

=== Notable former players ===
The following players are among those who represented Kocaelispor in national and international competitions and have gained recognition:

- (Turkey) Orhan Ak
- (Turkey) Nuri Çolak
- (Turkey) Saffet Sancaklı
- (Turkey) Serdar Topraktepe
- (Turkey) Faruk Yiğit
- (Romania) Dumitru Stângaciu
- (South Africa) John Moshoeu
- (Germany) Detlef Müller
- (Ghana) Kwame Ayew
- (Bulgaria) Zdravko Lazarov
- (Egypt) Ahmed Hassan
- (Poland) Roman Dąbrowski
- (Serbia) Miško Mirković

== Non-playing staff ==
=== Administrative Staff ===
| Position | Name |
|---|---|
| Chairman | (Turkey) Recep Durul |
| Vice-President | (Turkey) Veli Başkurt |
| Vice-President | (Turkey) Ahmet Arık |
| Finance VP | (Turkey) Gürhan Darcan |
| Media & R&D | (Turkey) Fazile Ayşe Özkurt |
| Tech & Football | (Turkey) Osman Çakır |
| Clubs Coord. | (Turkey) Ramazan Daş |
| Investment | (Turkey) Kadir Genç |
| Investment & Ads | (Turkey) Serkan Akpolat |
| Ads VP | (Turkey) Engin Arat |
| Legal VP | (Turkey) Ahmet Şahin |
| Legal & R&D VP | (Turkey) Kamil Sert |
| Tickets & Stadium | (Turkey) Serkan Bulut |
| Fans VP | (Turkey) Mert Kavşut |
| TFF Relations VP | (Turkey) Orhan Dönmez |
| Football VP | (Turkey) Zeynel Abidin Akyol |
| Football VP | (Turkey) Serkan Bozbağ |
| Youth VP | (Turkey) Rafet Kırgız |
| Sports Branches | (Turkey) Okan Yıldırım |

=== Coaching staff ===
| Position | Name |
|---|---|
| Head coach | (Turkey) Selçuk İnan |
| Assistant coach | (Turkey) Sabahattin Yenilmez |
| Assistant coach | (Turkey) Volkan Kazak |
| Assistant coach | (Turkey) Olcan Adın |
| Goalkeeper coach | (Turkey) Hakan Bulut |
| Athletic coach | (Turkey) Ramazan Varli |
| Performance analyst | (Turkey) Emre Oğuz |
| Scout | (Turkey) Osman Yusuf Cömert |
| Club doctor | (Turkey) Gürbay Kahveci |
| Media officer | (Turkey) Fevzi Faruk Çetin |
| Youth development | (Turkey) Aydın Günaydın |
| Interpreter | (Turkey) Selim Kayalı |

== Coach History ==
Kocaelispor have been led by a mix of local and foreign coaches, with landmark spells under Holger Osieck and Hikmet Karaman. In the mid-1990s Mustafa Denizli stabilised the side and delivered a top-five league finish in 1995–96, setting up the strongest period in club history. Under Güvenç Kurtar the club also featured regularly in continental competition, including the 1996 Intertoto campaign and subsequent European ties recorded by the club’s archive.

German coach Holger Osieck arrived midway through 1996–97 and led Kocaelispor to the club’s first Turkish Cup. The two-leg final against Trabzonspor finished 1–1 in Trabzon and 1–0 in İzmit, with the return leg decided by a late goal at İsmetpaşa Stadium. Osieck’s role is widely marked in local coverage and anniversary events organised in İzmit. The cup win took Kocaelispor into the UEFA Cup Winners' Cup the following season; contemporary summaries note ties against Naţional Bucureşti and Lokomotiv Moskova.

Hikmet Karaman—initially an assistant in İzmit—returned as head coach in 2000 and guided Kocaelispor to a second Turkish Cup in 2001–02, defeating Beşiktaş 4–0 in the final at Bursa Atatürk Stadium. That success carried the club into the 2002–03 UEFA Cup, where they were eliminated by Ferencváros over two legs (0–5 agg.).

In addition to those title-winning tenures, other notable coaching spells include Denizli’s 1994–96 run (culminating in a top-five finish) and multiple appointments for Güvenç Kurtar, who took the team into European competition in the late 1990s and early 2000s.

| Season(s) | Manager |
|---|---|
| 1967–68 | (Turkey) Avni Kalkavan |
| 1968–69 | (Turkey) Selahattin Arın |
| 1970–71 | (Turkey) Avni Kalkavan |
| 1973 | (Turkey) Doğan Akı |
| 1973–74 | (Turkey) Suat Mamat |
| 1975–76 | (Turkey) Sabri Kiraz |
| 1975–76 | (Turkey) Tekin Yolaç |
| 1976–77 | (Turkey) Avni Kalkavan |
| 1976–77 | (Turkey) Muhterem Ar |
| 1977–78 | (Turkey) Çetin Güler |
| 1978–79 | (Turkey) Abdullah Matay |
| 1979–80 | (Turkey) Fethi Demircan |
| 1980–82 | (Turkey) Zeynel Soyuer |
| 1982 | (Turkey) Şener Dal |
| 1982 | (Turkey) Fethi Demircan |
| 1982–83 | (Turkey) Yılmaz Gökdel |
| 1983–84 | (Turkey) Özcan Arkoç |
| 1984–85 | (Turkey) Şener Dal |
| 1985–86 | (Turkey) Yılmaz Gökdel |
| 1986 | (Turkey) Çetin Güler |
| 1986–87 | (Turkey) Avni Kalkavan |
| 1987 | (Turkey) Ahmet Asena |
| 1988 | (Turkey) Şener Dal |
| 1988–89 | (Turkey) Nihat Atacan |
| 1990–91 | (Turkey) Adnan Dinçer |
| 1991–94 | (Turkey) Güvenç Kurtar |
| 1994 | (Germany) Reinhard Saftig |
| 1994–96 | (Turkey) Mustafa Denizli |
| 1996–97 | (Turkey) Hikmet Karaman |
| 1997–98 | (Germany) Holger Osieck |
| 1998–00 | (Turkey) Güvenç Kurtar |
| 2000 | (Turkey) Rasim Kara |
| 2000–02 | (Turkey) Hikmet Karaman |
| 2002–03 | (Turkey) Güvenç Kurtar |
| 2003 | (Turkey) Hüseyin Kalpar |
| 2003–04 | (Turkey) Erhan Arslan |
| 2004 | (Turkey) Engin Korukır |
| 2004–05 | (Turkey) Bahri Kaya |

| Season(s) | Manager |
|---|---|
| 2005 | (Turkey) Sadi Tekelioğlu |
| 2005–06 | (Turkey) Fuat Yaman |
| 2006 | (Turkey) Bülent Baturman |
| 2006 | (Turkey) Ümit Kayhan |
| 2006–07 | (Turkey) Fatih Uraz |
| 2007 | (Turkey) Orhan Şerit |
| 2007 | (Turkey) Fuat Yaman |
| 2007–08 | (Turkey) Kayhan Çubuklu |
| 2008 | (Turkey) Engin İpekoğlu |
| 2008–09 | (Turkey) Yılmaz Vural |
| 2009 | (Turkey) Erhan Altın |
| 2009–10 | (Turkey) Cihat Arslan |
| 2010 | (Turkey) Bülent Baturman |
| 2010 | (Turkey) Coşkun Demirkabakan |
| 2010–11 | (Turkey) Soner Alp |
| 2011 | (Turkey) Ceyhun Güray |
| 2011 | (Turkey) Yalçın Kıldıran |
| 2011–12 | (Turkey) Ekrem Albayrak |
| 2012–13 | (Turkey) Bülent Baturman |
| 2013 | (Turkey) Yalçın Kıldıran |
| 2013 | (Turkey) Faruk Sarman |
| 2013–14 | (Turkey) Ahmet Arslaner |
| 2014–15 | (Turkey) Kayhan Çubuklu |
| 2015–16 | (Turkey) Ergün Ortakcı |
| 2016–17 | (Turkey) Ümit Metin Yıldız |
| 2017 | (Turkey) Fatih Kavlak |
| 2018–19 | (Turkey) Galip Gündoğdu |
| 2019 | (Turkey) Engin Korukır |
| 2019–20 | (Turkey) Selahaddin Dinçel |
| 2020–21 | (Turkey) Erhan Altın |
| 2021–22 | (Turkey) Mustafa Reşit Akçay |
| 2022 | (Turkey) Mehmet Altıparmak |
| 2022–23 | (Turkey) Fırat Gül |
| 2023–24 | (Turkey) Ertuğrul Sağlam |
| 2024 | (Turkey) Mustafa Gürsel |
| 2024 | (Turkey) Ertuğrul Sağlam |
| 2024–25 | (Turkey) İsmet Taşdemir |
| 2025– | (Turkey) Selçuk İnan |

== President history ==
Over the course of the club’s history, Kocaelispor have been led by a long line of locally known administrators, beginning in the mid-1960s with figures such as İsmail Kolaylı, Baki Efe and İbrahim Küçükörs, and then by longer stints under Erol Köse (1972–78) and İsmail Kalkandelen in the late 1970s and mid-1980s. The presidency of Sefa Sirmen (1991–2002) is widely regarded as the club’s most successful modern era: during his tenure Kocaelispor consolidated their place in the top flight, built competitive squads and captured two Turkish Cups (1996–97 and 2001–02), the only major national trophies in the club’s cabinet.

The 2000s brought shorter administrations and financial headwinds, with a rapid succession of presidents (including Hikmet Erenkaya, İbrahim Saral, Cemal Derya and Serhan Gürkan) as the club navigated relegations and restructuring. From 2014 to 2019, Bahri Yavuz presided over a community-driven rebuild, followed by a period of stabilization and renewed professionalization under Hüseyin Üzülmez (2019–20) and Engin Koyun (2020–24), coinciding with the club’s steady climb back up the league pyramid and the settling of operations at the new Kocaeli Stadium. In March 2024, Recep Durul took office, with a mandate to maintain financial discipline, strengthen the academy-to-first-team pathway and keep the club competitive as it seeks sustainable success.

| Season(s) | President |
|---|---|
| 1966–68 | (Turkey) İsmail Kolaylı |
| 1968–69 | (Turkey) Baki Efe |
| 1969–70 | (Turkey) İbrahim Küçükörs |
| 1970–71 | (Turkey) Lütfü Tokoğlu |
| 1971 | (Turkey) Fuat Özçelebi |
| 1971–72 | (Turkey) İbrahim Küçükörs |
| 1972–78 | (Turkey) Erol Köse |
| 1978–79 | (Turkey) İbrahim Küçükörs |
| 1979–80 | (Turkey) İsmail Kalkandelen |
| 1980–82 | (Turkey) Hüseyin Kolaylı |
| 1982–83 | (Turkey) Ömer Gencal |
| 1983–86 | (Turkey) İsmail Kalkandelen |
| 1986–87 | (Turkey) Turan Sarı |
| 1987 | (Turkey) Necati Gençoğlu |
| 1987 | (Turkey) Mehmet Sait Yavuz |
| 1987–88 | (Turkey) Yusuf Dayı |
| 1988 | (Turkey) Mehmet Yalaz |
| 1988–89 | (Turkey) Muharrem Eskiyapan |

| Season(s) | President |
|---|---|
| 1989 | (Turkey) Mustafa Turan |
| 1989–90 | (Turkey) Güngör Kandemir |
| 1990–91 | (Turkey) İsmet Kaya |
| 1991–02 | (Turkey) Sefa Sirmen |
| 2002–04 | (Turkey) Hikmet Erenkaya |
| 2004–06 | (Turkey) İbrahim Saral |
| 2006–07 | (Turkey) Cemal Derya |
| 2007 | (Turkey) Mustafa Ekşi |
| 2007–09 | (Turkey) Serhan Gürkan |
| 2009–10 | (Turkey) Muammer Çelik |
| 2010–11 | (Turkey) Serkan Toprakoğlu |
| 2011–13 | (Turkey) Orhan Görşen |
| 2013–14 | (Turkey) Nebil Uzun |
| 2014–19 | (Turkey) Bahri Yavuz |
| 2019–20 | (Turkey) Hüseyin Üzülmez |
| 2020–24 | (Turkey) Engin Koyun |
| 2024– | (Turkey) Recep Durul |
