= Direc-t =

- Origin: Turkey
- Genres: Alternative rock
- Years active: 1997–present
- Label: ON-AIR Müzik
- Members: Alex Tintaru; Bilge Kösebalaban; Özgür Peştimalci
- Website: www.direc-t.com

Direc-t is an alternative rock band from Turkey, originally founded in Adana. Their members include Alex Tintaru, Bilge Kösebalaban and Özgür Peştimalci.

== Band history ==
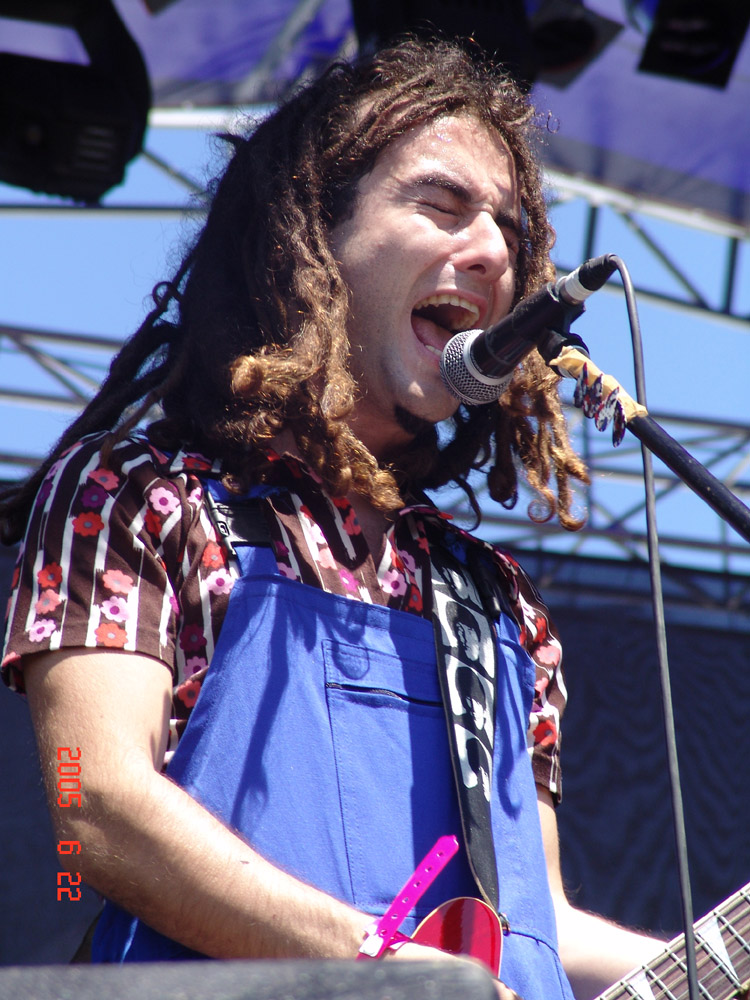
Bilge Kösebalaban (2005)

A car accident resulted in the naming of the band Direc-t in 1997. The band's name Direc-t means "post", named after the post that they crashed into. The band decided to stick with the name Direc-t as it was appealing to the members. The band broke up in 1998 and the re-teamed with different members in 1999.

Ozgur Pestimalci joined the band in 1999 as the drummer, while Alex Tintaru, bass guitarist from Moldova, joined the band in 2000. Direc-t won its first music award in 2001 at the Roxy Music Awards. In 2002 the band shared the same stage with David Byrne, Pulp, Sneaker Pimps and Carl Cox at the Alternative Festival in Istanbul. In 2002 they played on the demo stage at the H2000 festival.

In 2003 they played a show on the main stage at the H2000 festival. In 2003 Direc-t signed a contract with On-Air Productions and they recorded their first studio album with Deniz Yılmaz (Kurban) contributing as the producer. The first album Rus Kozmonatları ("Russian cosmonauts") was released in June 2004 with 10 songs in Turkish and one in English.

The band shot the first video from Rus Kozmonatları ("Russian Cosmonauts") to the song "Dur Sakın Konuşma" ("Stop Do Not Talk") and then to "Hasret" ("Longing") and "Ama Sen Varsın" ("But You are Exist") songs. The video of "Ama Sen Varsın" as an animated video caught the attention of the public.

In 2004 the band performed in the Rock Istanbul Festival which was broadcast live from Dream TV. In July 2004, Direc-t performed at the Pohoda Festival in Slovakia and assumed the title of the first Turkish band ever to have performed in Slovakia. In 2004 Direc-t played a benefit show for the Tsunami victims in South Asia at Yedi Kule Zindanları ("Dungeons of Yedikule") in Istanbul. In 2005 Direc-t started touring with the Fanta Gençlik Festvali ("Fanta Youth Festival") which included 17 cities all over Turkey.

In 2005 the band made an appearance on the main stage of the Rock Istanbul Festival. In addition, Direc-t performed in many bars in Istanbul such as Line, Kemancı, Life Bar, Bronx, Gitar Bar, Vox, Yeni Melek Gösteri Merkezi ("Yeni Melek Show Center"), Stüdyo Live and also in other cities such as Ooze Bar (İzmir), Saklıkent (Ankara), Bar Fly (Ankara) and Doors (Eskişehir). The band also appeared as musical guest at various University and High School Festivals (German High School, Ereğli Anatolian High School) all over Turkey.

Direc-t's second studio album Olympos was released in Turkey. In 2005 a song by Direc-t was released in a Turkish compilation in Russia and Ukraine. A song by Bilge Kosebalaban called "Anything I've done" was selected as a December finalist in VH1-Song of the Year-2005. It is a duet with Gulce Duru.

The band had two songs in two other compilations released in Australia by Starving Kids Records in 2007. Direc-t played in the Midpoint Music Festival on 2007 and also at Mo Pitkins Club in New York East Village.

In 2009 the band played two gigs in Germany: Sommerlounge festival in Pforzheim and in a club in Aachen. They also performed in the Ukraine-Slavske Rock Fest in Lviv region.

The band has shot their 3rd video for "Pembe Elbise" ("Pink Dress") and their 4th one "Derya" from their second album, Olympos.

Their last video, "Git", can be seen on TV channels and the band has finished recording their 3rd studio album.

== Personnel ==
- Alex Tintaru – bass
- Bilge Kösebalaban – vocals, guitar
- Özgür Peştimalci – drums

== Discography ==
- Rus Kozmonotlari (Russian Cosmonauts) (2004)
- Olympos (2005)
