= Nuri Çolak =

Turkish footballer

Personal information
- Date of birth: 17 August 1975 (age 51)
- Position: Defender

Senior career*
Years	Team	Apps	(Gls)
1994–2003	Kocaelispor		
2003–2005	Gaziantepspor		
2005	Kocaelispor		
2006–2007	Şekerspor		
2007–2008	Bozüyükspor		

International career
2001	Turkey	1	(0)
- * Club domestic league appearances and goals

Nuri Çolak (born 17 August 1975) is a retired Turkish football defender.

While at Kocaelispor he scored the winning goal in the 1997 Turkish Cup Final against Trabzonspor, which helped his team to a 2-1 aggregate win.

== Honours ==
=== Club ===
Kocaelispor

- Turkish Cup (2): 1996–97, 2001–02
