= Serdar Topraktepe =

Turkish retired footballer (born 1976)

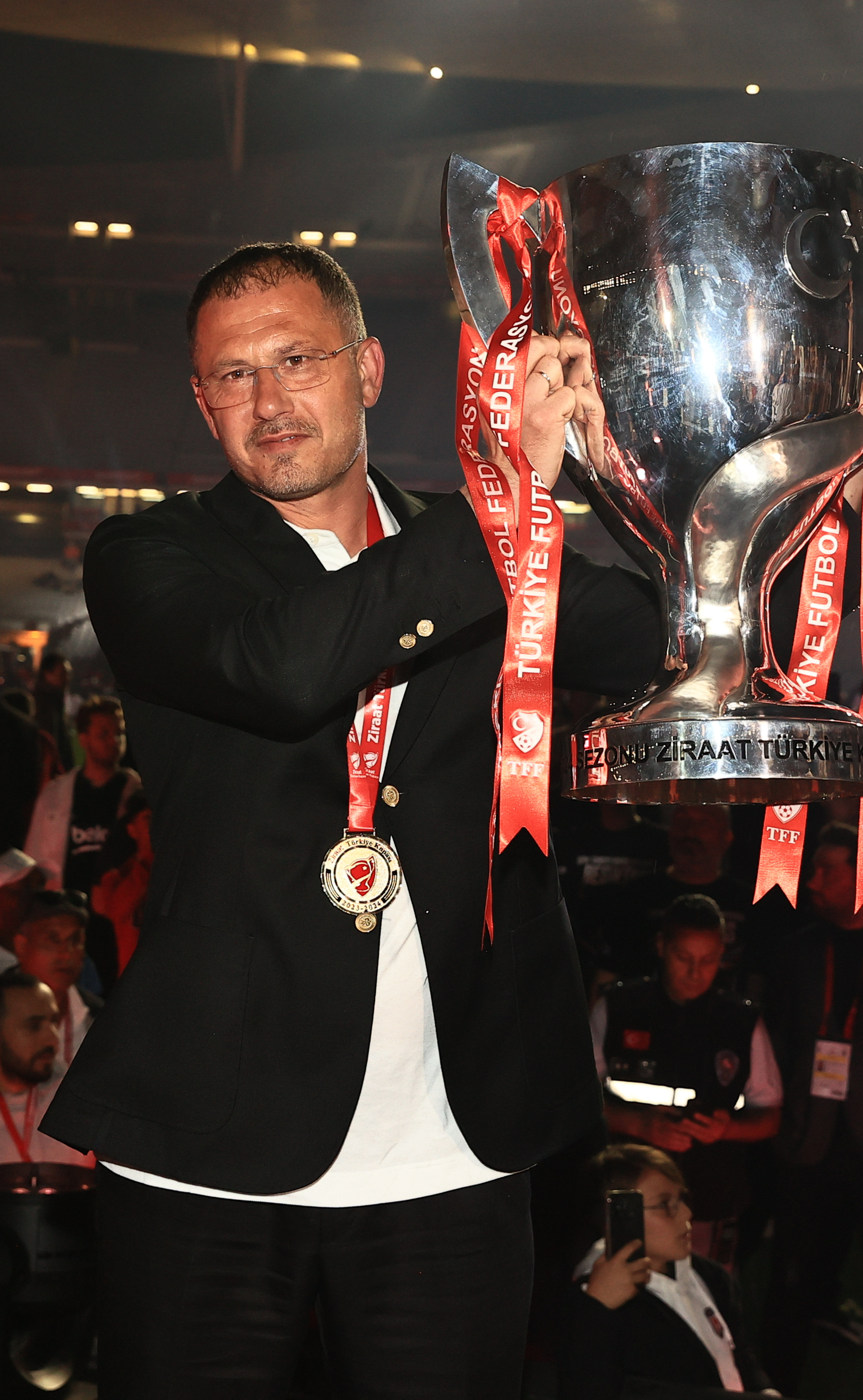

Personal information
- Date of birth: 25 August 1976 (age 50)
- Place of birth: Istanbul, Turkey
- Height: 1.83 m (6 ft 0 in)
- Positions: Attacking midfielder; winger; striker

Team information
- Current team: Beşiktaş (Assistant Manager)

Youth career
- 1989–1994: Karagümrükspor

Senior career*
Years	Team	Apps	(Gls)
1994–1999	Beşiktaş	94	(7)
1999–2002	Kocaelispor	92	(32)
2002–2004	Beşiktaş	25	(5)
2004	Kocaelispor	16	(4)
2005–2006	Bursaspor	43	(12)
2006–2007	Sivasspor	23	(0)
2007–2011	Kocaelispor	113	(25)
2011–2013	Kocaeli Birlik Spor	52	(8)

International career
1991–1992	Turkey U15	11	(?)
1992–1993	Turkey U16	23	(3)
1993	Turkey U17	5	(0)
1994–1995	Turkey U18	19	(6)
1996–1997	Turkey U21	10	(3)
1996–1997	Turkey	2	(0)
1997	Turkey U23	5	(0)

Managerial career
- 2016–2017: Dikilitaş SK (assistant)
- 2018–2019: Beşiktaş U19 (assistant)
- 2021: Adanaspor (assistant)
- 2021: Beşiktaş U19 (assistant)
- 2022: Beşiktaş (assistant)
- 2022: Beşiktaş U19 (assistant)
- 2022: Beşiktaş Reserves
- 2022: Beşiktaş U19
- 2023: Beşiktaş (assistant)
- 2023: Beşiktaş (caretaker)
- 2024: Beşiktaş (interim)
- 2024–: Beşiktas (assistant)
- * Club domestic league appearances and goals

Serdar Topraktepe (born 25 August 1976) is a Turkish football coach and former player who is the assistant manager at Beşiktaş. He played as a striker or as a left sided winger.

Topraktepe has previously played for Beşiktaş, Kocaelispor, Bursaspor, Sivasspor and Kocaeli Birlik Spor. During his playing time in Kocaelispor, he wore the jersey number 41, which is also the license plate for Kocaeli.

== Playing career ==
His displays in 2007–08 season for Kocaelispor helped his team to win promotion from TFF First League. Topraktepe was a skillful forward with flair and fierce shots. He was capped only twice for Turkey at senior level, despite having represented Turkey several times at youth levels. In his long career he had four league and two Turkish Cup titles.

== Managerial career ==
On 22 December 2023, after the resignation of Beşiktaş manager Rıza Çalımbay, Topraktepe became the interim coach of Beşiktaş. His first match as Beşiktaş manager was an away match on 25 December 2023 held at Mersin Stadium, in which Beşiktaş defeated Hatayspor 2–1. He returned to his assistant duties following Fernando Santos' assignment as manager on 7 January 2024, but was reappointed as interim on 13 April 2024 until the end of the 2023–24 season due to Santos' sacking.

On 9 January 2026 Topraktepe was referred to the Turkish Football Federation's disciplinary committee over allegations of placing bets. His referral is part of the 2025 Turkish football betting scandal.

== Managerial Statistics ==
As of 18 January 2025

Team	Nat	From	To	Record				
Team	Nat	From	To	G	W	D	L	Win %
Beşiktaş Reserves	(Turkey)	2022	2023	4	3	0	1	75.00
Beşiktaş U19	(Turkey)	2022	2024	34	19	7	8	55.88
Beşiktaş	(Turkey)	2023	2024	12	6	3	3	50.00
Beşiktaş	(Turkey)	2024	2024	9	3	4	2	33.33
Total				59	31	14	14	52.54

== Personal life ==
Topraktepe was born on 25 August 1976 in Istanbul. He is the brother of the footballer Ömer Topraktepe.

== Honours ==
=== Player ===
Beşiktaş

- Turkish Super League: 1994–95, 2002–03
- Turkish Cup: 1997–98
- Turkish Super Cup: 1998

Kocaelispor

- Turkish Cup: 2001–02
- TFF First League: 2007–08

Bursaspor

- TFF First League: 2005–06

=== Manager ===
Beşiktaş

- Turkish Cup: 2023–24
