= 2001–02 Galatasaray S.K. season =

Galatasaray
2001–02 season
- President: (Turkey) Mehmet Cansun (until 23 March 2002) (Turkey) Özhan Canaydın
- Head coach: (Romania) Mircea Lucescu
- Stadium: Ali Sami Yen Stadı
- Süper Lig: 1st
- Turkish Cup: Third round
- UEFA Champions League: Second group stage
- FIFA Club World Championship: Cancelled
- Top goalscorer: League: Arif Erdem (21); All: Arif Erdem (23)
Home colours	Away colours	Third colours

The 2001–02 season was Galatasaray's 98th in existence and the 44th consecutive season in the Süper Lig. This article shows statistics of the club's players in the season, and also lists all matches that the club have played in the season.

== Squad statistics ==
No.	Pos.	Name	Süper Lig		Türkiye Kupası		CL		Total	
No.	Pos.	Name	Apps	Goals	Apps	Goals	Apps	Goals	Apps	Goals
1	GK	(Colombia) Faryd Mondragón	28	0	0	0	15	0	43	0
61	GK	(Turkey) Mehmet Bölükbaşi	0	0	0	0	0	0	0	0
16	GK	(Turkey) Kerem İnan	6	0	1	0	1	0	8	0
35	DF	(Brazil) Capone	26	0	1	0	11	0	38	0
4	DF	(Romania) Gheorghe Popescu	1	0	0	0	3	0	4	0
3	DF	(Turkey) Bülent Korkmaz (C)	26	3	0	0	12	0	38	3
2	DF	(Turkey) Vedat İnceefe	11	1	0	0	3	0	14	1
5	DF	(Turkey) Emre Aşık	27	0	1	0	12	0	40	0
14	DF	(Colombia) Gustavo Victoria	21	1	1	0	6	0	28	1
15	DF	(France) Sébastien Pérez	18	3	1	0	14	1	32	4
57	DF	(Turkey) Hakan Ünsal	8	0	0	0	8	0	16	0
21	MF	(Turkey) Faruk Atalay	3	0	1	0	0	0	4	0
67	MF	(Turkey) Ergün Penbe	31	1	1	0	15	0	47	1
18	MF	(Turkey) Ayhan Akman	23	0	1	0	6	0	30	0
11	MF	(Turkey) Hasan Şaş	27	2	1	0	15	1	43	3
4	MF	(Brazil) João Batista	16	1	0	0	0	0	16	1
8	MF	(Turkey) Suat Kaya	19	1	0	0	12	1	31	2
13	MF	(Turkey) Sergen Yalçın	18	7	0	0	9	2	27	9
22	MF	(Turkey) Ümit Davala	3	2	0	0	5	1	8	3
23	MF	(Uruguay) Andrés Fleurquin	18	2	1	0	10	1	29	3
27	MF	(Turkey) Erhan Namlı	3	0	1	0	0	0	4	0
24	MF	(Czech Republic) Pavel Horváth	3	0	0	0	0	0	3	0
12	MF	(Turkey) Bülent Akın	17	2	1	0	11	0	29	2
53	MF	(Colombia) Jersson González	0	0	0	0	0	0	0	0
7	MF	(Turkey) Berkant Göktan	21	5	0	0	9	0	30	5
55	FW	(Turkey) Serkan Aykut	21	9	1	0	8	2	30	11
25	FW	(Turkey) Murat Sözkesen	7	1	0	0	1	0	8	1
6	FW	(Turkey) Arif Erdem	32	21	0	0	13	2	45	23
20	FW	(Croatia) Robert Špehar	1	0	0	0	0	0	1	0
19	FW	(Belgium) Mbo Mpenza	0	0	0	0	0	0	0	0
26	FW	(Romania) Radu Niculescu	9	3	0	0	4	1	13	4
9	FW	(Turkey) Ümit Karan	28	7	1	0	14	7	43	14

=== Players in / out ===
==== In ====
Pos.	Nat.	Name	Age	Moving from
FW	(Belgium)	Mbo Mpenza	25	Sporting CP
MF	(Czech Republic)	Pavel Horváth	26	Sporting CP
FW	(Croatia)	Robert Špehar	31	Sporting CP
GK	(Colombia)	Faryd Mondragón	30	Metz on loan
DF	(Colombia)	Gustavo Victoria	21	Deportivo Cali
DF	(France)	Sébastien Pérez	28	Marseille on loan
MF	(Turkey)	Ayhan Akman	24	Beşiktaş
MF	(Uruguay)	Andrés Fleurquin	26	Sturm Graz
MF	(Turkey)	Sergen Yalçın	29	Siirtspor
FW	(Turkey)	Ümit Karan	25	Gençlerbirliği
MF	(Turkey)	Erhan Namlı	27	Trabzonspor
MF	(Turkey)	Berkant Göktan	21	Bayern Munich
MF	(Brazil)	João Batista	26	Gaziantepspor
MF	(Colombia)	Jersson González	27	América de Cali
FW	(Turkey)	Murat Sözkesen	26	Bursaspor
FW	(Romania)	Radu Niculescu	26	Naţional București

==== Out ====
Pos.	Nat.	Name	Age	Moving to
MF	(Romania)	Gheorghe Hagi	36	career end
DF	(Romania)	Gheorghe Popescu	34	Lecce
GK	(Brazil)	Cláudio Taffarel	35	Parma
MF	(Turkey)	Okan Buruk	28	Inter Milan
MF	(Turkey)	Emre Belözoğlu	21	Inter Milan
FW	(Brazil)	Mário Jardel	28	Sporting CP
DF	(Turkey)	Fatih Akyel	24	Mallorca
FW	(Brazil)	Márcio Mixirica	26	Boavista
MF	(Turkey)	Mehmet Yozgatlı	22	Istanbulspor
MF	(Turkey)	Ahmet Yıldırım	27	Beşiktaş
FW	(Turkey)	Saffet Akyüz	31	Antalyaspor
MF	(Turkey)	Faruk Atalay	20	Bursaspor on loan
GK	(Ghana)	Richard Kingson	23	Antalyaspor on loan
DF	(Turkey)	Emrah Eren	22	Gaziantepspor on loan
MF	(Turkey)	Mehmet Gönülaçar	29	Erzurumspor on loan
FW	(Belgium)	Mbo Mpenza	25	Mouscron
MF	(Czech Republic)	Pavel Horváth	26	Teplice
FW	(Croatia)	Robert Špehar	31	Standard Liège
MF	(Turkey)	Erhan Namlı	27	Çaykur Rizespor on loan
DF	(Turkey)	Hakan Ünsal	28	Blackburn Rovers
DF	(Turkey)	Ufuk Talay	25	Nîmes on loan

== Süper Lig ==
=== Standings ===
Pos	Team	Pld	W	D	L	GF	GA	GD	Pts	Qualification or relegation
1	Galatasaray (C)	34	24	6	4	75	31	+44	78	Qualification to Champions League group stage
2	Fenerbahçe	34	24	3	7	70	31	+39	75	Qualification to Champions League third qualifying round
3	Beşiktaş	34	18	8	8	69	39	+30	62	Qualification to UEFA Cup first round
4	MKE Ankaragücü	34	15	8	11	72	58	+14	53	Qualification to UEFA Cup first round
5	Denizlispor	34	12	12	10	65	52	+13	48 (Note: Denizlispor were ahead of Gaziantepspor on head-to-head record: Denizlispor–Gaziantepspor 5–2, Gaziantepspor–Denizlispor 0–0.)	Qualification to UEFA Cup first round

Rules for classification: 1) points; 2) goal difference; 3) number of goals scored.
(C) Champions

=== Matches ===
12 August 2001 1	Gaziantepspor	1–1	Galatasaray	Gaziantep
	Tekke 20'	Report	Yalçın 42'; Kaya (red card) 66'	Stadium: Gaziantep Kamil Ocak Stadium

18 August 2001 2	Galatasaray	1–0	Denizlispor	Istanbul
	Ergün 59'	Report	Muzaffer Bilazer (red card) 58'	Stadium: Ali Sami Yen Stadium

26 August 2001 3	Çaykur Rizespor	3–6	Galatasaray	Rize
	Ümit Ozan Kazmaz 57'; Tetteh 65'; Recep Asil 87'	Report	Erdem 15', 62', 82'; Aykut 20'; Davala 23', 54'; Korkmaz (red card) 37'	Stadium: Rize Atatürk Stadium

8 September 2001 4	Galatasaray	2–1	Antalyaspor	Istanbul
	Yalçın 18'; Karan 90'	Report	Kamburoglu 49'	Stadium: Ali Sami Yen Stadium

15 September 2001 5	Malatyaspor	0–2	Galatasaray	Malatya
		Report	Kaya 4'; Korkmaz 25'	Stadium: Malatya İnönü Stadium

22 September 2001 6	Galatasaray	2–0	Fenerbahçe	Istanbul
	Akın 54'; Aykut 81' (pen.)	Report		Stadium: Ali Sami Yen Stadium

30 September 2001 7	Gençlerbirliği	1–3	Galatasaray	Ankara
	Mehmet Ali Çakmak 30'	Report	Yalçın 20'; Erdem 69', 70'	Stadium: Ankara 19 Mayıs Stadium

12 October 2001 8	Galatasaray	4–1	Göztepe	Istanbul
	İnceefe 1'; Aykut 3', 73'; Erdem 67'	Report	Kabát 19' (pen.)	Stadium: Ali Sami Yen Stadium

21 October 2001 9	Beşiktaş	2–2	Galatasaray	Istanbul
	Bektaş 10'; Aşık 30' (o.g.)	Report	Fleurquin 61'; Erdem 77'	Stadium: BJK İnönü Stadium

27 October 2001 10	Galatasaray	3–1	Trabzonspor	Istanbul
	Aykut 21' (pen.), 59' (pen.); Erdem 41'	Report	Mustafa Macit Güven 34'; Ataman (red card) 80' (at bench)	Stadium: Ali Sami Yen Stadium

2 November 2001 11	Bursaspor	5–0	Galatasaray	Bursa
	Ömer Kılıç 13'; Murat Sözkesen 34', 76'; Yılmaz 54', 90'	Report		Stadium: Bursa Atatürk Stadium

17 November 2001 12	Galatasaray	5–1	Diyarbakırspor	Istanbul
	Karan 6', 23'; Yalçın 48'; Erdem 52'; Korkmaz 55'	Report	N'Gole 82'	Stadium: Ali Sami Yen Stadium

24 November 2001 13	Galatasaray	2–0	Samsunspor	Istanbul
	Yalçın 30', 35' (pen.)	Report		Stadium: Ali Sami Yen Stadium

30 November 2001 14	Galatasaray	4–1	İstanbulspor	Istanbul
	Akın 10'; Erdem 49', 88'; Aykut 69'	Report	Petkov (red card) 30'; Bushi (yellow card) 32' (yellow-red card) 34'; Üçüncü 85' (pen.)	Stadium: Ali Sami Yen Stadium

9 December 2001 15	Ankaragücü	2–1	Galatasaray	Ankara
	Kennedy 9'; Keleş (yellow card) 42' (yellow-red card) 70'; Ahinful 79'	Report	Aşık (red card) 85'; Aykut 89'	Stadium: Ankara 19 Mayıs Stadium

23 December 2001 17	Yimpaş Yozgatspor	3–3	Galatasaray	Yozgat
		Report		Stadium: Bozok Stadium

15 January 2002 16(*)	Galatasaray	5–1	Kocaelispor	Istanbul
		Report		Stadium: Ali Sami Yen Stadium
Note: Matchweek 16 was originally played from 14 to 16 December 2001.

19 January 2002 18	Galatasaray	2–0	Gaziantepspor	Istanbul
		Report		Stadium: Ali Sami Yen Stadium

23 January 2002 19	Denizlispor	1–1	Galatasaray	Denizli
		Report		Stadium: Denizli Atatürk Stadium

27 January 2002 20	Galatasaray	4–1	Çaykur Rizespor	Istanbul
		Report		Stadium: Ali Sami Yen Stadium

3 February 2002 21	Antalyaspor	1–1	Galatasaray	Antalya
		Report		Stadium: Antalya Atatürk Stadium

8 February 2002 22	Galatasaray	1–0	Malatyaspor	Istanbul
		Report		Stadium: Ali Sami Yen Stadium

16 February 2002 23	Fenerbahçe	1–0	Galatasaray	Istanbul
		Report		Stadium: Şükrü Saracoğlu Stadium

23 February 2002 24	Galatasaray	3–1	Gençlerbirliği	Istanbul
		Report		Stadium: Ali Sami Yen Stadium

3 March 2002 25	Göztepe	2–0	Galatasaray	İzmir
		Report		Stadium: İzmir Atatürk Stadium

9 March 2002 26	Galatasaray	1–0	Beşiktaş	Istanbul
		Report		Stadium: Ali Sami Yen Stadium

23 March 2002 28	Galatasaray	2–1	Bursaspor	Istanbul
		Report		Stadium: Ali Sami Yen Stadium

30 March 2002 29	Diyarbakırspor	0–0	Galatasaray	Diyarbakır
		Report		Stadium: Diyarbakır Atatürk Stadium

3 April 2002 27(*)	Trabzonspor	0–2	Galatasaray	Trabzon
		Report	Arif 13'; Hasan Şaş 88'	Stadium: Hüseyin Avni Aker Stadium
Note: Matchweek 27 was originally played from 15 to 17 March 2002.

7 April 2002 30	Samsunspor	0–1	Galatasaray	Samsun
		Report	Niculescu 84'	Stadium: Samsun 19 Mayıs Stadium

13 April 2002 31	İstanbulspor	0–2	Galatasaray	Istanbul
	Ferdi (red card) 21'; Zdravkov (red card) 35'	Report	Saffet 18' (o.g.); Arif 37' (pen.)	Stadium: Güngören M.Yahya Baş Stadium

21 April 2002 32	Galatasaray	2–0	Ankaragücü	Istanbul
	Burak 31' (o.g.); Arif 84' (pen.)	Report		Stadium: Ali Sami Yen Stadium

28 April 2002 33	Kocaelispor	0–2	Galatasaray	İzmit
		Report	Hasan Şaş 44'; Niculescu 88'	Stadium: İzmit İsmetpaşa Stadium

4 May 2002 34	Galatasaray	5–0	Yimpaş Yozgatspor	Istanbul
	Pérez 31', 71'; Niculescu 34'; Arif 56', 86'	Report		Stadium: Ali Sami Yen Stadium

== Türkiye Kupası ==
Kick-off listed in local time (EET)

=== Third round ===
27 November 2001 1	Erzurumspor	1–0	Galatasaray	Erzurum
12:30 EET	Eyüp Saka 96'	(Report)		Stadium: Cemal Gürsel Stadı; Referee: Musa Eryılmaz

== UEFA Champions League ==
=== Second qualifying round ===
25 July 2001 1	Galatasaray	2–0	Vllaznia Shkodër	Istanbul
21:45 EET	Ümit Karan 18'; Suat Kaya 90'	(Report)		Stadium: Ali Sami Yen Stadı; Referee: (Portugal) Joaquim Paulo Paraty da Silva

1 August 2001 2	Vllaznia Shkodër	1–4 (1–6 agg.)	Galatasaray	Tirana
21:45 EET	Vioresin Sinani 26'	(Report)	Ümit Karan 38'; Hasan Şaş 49'; Arif Erdem 69'; Serkan Aykut 80'	Stadium: Qemal Stafa Stadium; Referee: (England) Mike Riley

=== Third qualifying round ===
8 August 2001 1	Galatasaray	2–1	Levski Sofia	Istanbul
21:45 EET	Ümit Karan 9'; Ümit Davala 75'	(Report)	Georgi Ivanov 77'	Stadium: Ali Sami Yen Stadı; Referee: (Germany) Herbert Fandel

22 August 2001 2	Levski Sofia	1–1 (2–3 agg.)	Galatasaray	Sofia
21:45 EET	Miodrag Pantelić 79'	(Report)	Serkan Aykut 50'	Stadium: Georgi Asparuhov Stadium; Referee: (France) Claude Colombo

=== Group stage ===
Pos	Team	Pld	W	D	L	GF	GA	GD	Pts	Qualification	NAN	GAL	PSV	LAZ
1	(France) Nantes	6	3	2	1	8	3	+5	11	Advance to second group stage	—	0–1	4–1	1–0
2	(Turkey) Galatasaray	6	3	1	2	5	4	+1	10	Advance to second group stage	0–0	—	2–0	1–0
3	(Netherlands) PSV Eindhoven	6	2	1	3	6	9	−3	7	Transfer to UEFA Cup	0–0	3–1	—	1–0
4	(Italy) Lazio	6	2	0	4	4	7	−3	6		1–3	1–0	2–1	—

Source: RSSSF

11 September 2001 1	Galatasaray	1–0	Lazio	Istanbul
21:45 EET	Ümit Karan 79'	Report		Stadium: Ali Sami Yen Stadı; Referee: (Poland) Ryszard Wójcik

19 September 2001 2	PSV Eindhoven	3–1	Galatasaray	Arnhem
21:45 EET	Arnold Bruggink 38'; Ernest Faber 53'; Mateja Kežman 90'	Report	Ümit Karan 68'	Stadium: GelreDome; Referee: (Spain) Manuel Mejuto González

26 September 2001 3	Nantes	0–1	Galatasaray	Nantes
21:45 EET		Report	Sergen Yalçın 79'	Stadium: Stade de la Beaujoire; Referee: (Norway) Tom Henning Øvrebø

16 October 2001 4	Galatasaray	0–0	Nantes	Istanbul
21:45 EET		Report		Stadium: Ali Sami Yen Stadı; Referee: (Germany) Hellmut Krug

24 October 2001 5	Lazio	1–0	Galatasaray	Rome
21:45 EET	Dejan Stanković 76'	Report		Stadium: Stadio Olimpico; Referee: (Russia) Nikolai Levnikov

30 October 2001 6	Galatasaray	2–0	PSV Eindhoven	Istanbul
21:45 EET	Sergen Yalçın 26'; Arif Erdem 50'	Report		Stadium: Ali Sami Yen Stadı; Referee: (Slovakia) Ľuboš Micheľ

=== Second group stage ===
Pos	Team	Pld	W	D	L	GF	GA	GD	Pts	Qualification	BAR	LIV	ROM	GAL
1	(Spain) Barcelona	6	2	3	1	7	7	0	9	Advance to knockout stage	—	0–0	1–1	2–2
2	(England) Liverpool	6	1	4	1	4	4	0	7	Advance to knockout stage	1–3	—	2–0	0–0
3	(Italy) Roma	6	1	4	1	6	5	+1	7		3–0	0–0	—	1–1
4	(Turkey) Galatasaray	6	0	5	1	5	6	−1	5		0–1	1–1	1–1	—

Source: RSSSF

20 November 2001 1	Galatasaray	1–1	Roma	Istanbul
21:45 EET	Sébastien Pérez 22'	Report	Emerson 90'	Stadium: Ali Sami Yen Stadı; Referee: (France) Claude Colombo

5 December 2001 2	Barcelona	2–2	Galatasaray	Barcelona
21:45 EET	Javier Saviola 49', 66'	Report	Ümit Karan 5'; Andrés Fleurquin 41'	Stadium: Camp Nou; Referee: (Germany) Markus Merk

20 February 2002 3	Liverpool	0–0	Galatasaray	Liverpool
21:45 EET		Report		Stadium: Anfield; Attendance: 41,605; Referee: (Portugal) Vítor Melo Pereira

26 February 2002 4	Galatasaray	1–1	Liverpool	Istanbul
21:45 EET	Radu Niculescu 71'	Report	Emile Heskey 79'	Stadium: Ali Sami Yen Stadı; Referee: (Switzerland) Urs Meier

13 March 2002 5	Roma	1–1	Galatasaray	Rome
21:45 EET	Cafu 52'	Report	Ümit Karan 45'	Stadium: Stadio Olimpico; Referee: (Sweden) Anders Frisk

19 March 2002 6	Galatasaray	0–1	Barcelona	Istanbul
21:45 EET		Report	Luis Enrique 58'	Stadium: Ali Sami Yen Stadı; Referee: (Netherlands) René Temmink

== FIFA Club World Championship ==
As winners of the 2000 UEFA Super Cup, Galatasaray was one of the 12 teams that were invited to the 2001 FIFA Club World Championship, which would be hosted in Spain from 28 July to 12 August 2001. However, the tournament was cancelled, primarily due to the collapse of ISL, which was a marketing partner of FIFA at the time.

=== Group stage ===
30 July 2001 1	Galatasaray (Turkey)	Cancelled	(Saudi Arabia) Al-Hilal	Madrid, Spain
				Stadium: Vicente Calderón

3 August 2001 2	Olimpia (Honduras)	Cancelled	(Turkey) Galatasaray	Madrid, Spain
				Stadium: Vicente Calderón

6 August 2001 3	Galatasaray (Turkey)	Cancelled	(Brazil) Palmeiras	Madrid, Spain
				Stadium: Vicente Calderón

== Attendances ==
Competition	Av. Att.	Total Att.
1. Lig	-	-
Türkiye Kupası	-	-
Champions League	21,709	173,674
Total	-	-
