= 2000–01 Galatasaray S.K. season =

Galatasaray
2000–01 season
- President: Faruk Süren (until 17 July 2001); Mehmet Cansun
- Head coach: Mircea Lucescu
- Stadium: Ali Sami Yen Stadı
- 1.Lig: 2nd
- Turkish Cup: Semi-finals
- UEFA Champions League: Quarter-finals
- UEFA Super Cup: Winners
- FIFA Club World Cup: Cancelled
- Top goalscorer: League: Mário Jardel (22); All: Mário Jardel (34)
Home colours	Away colours	Third colours

The 2000–01 season was Galatasaray's 97th in existence and the 43rd consecutive season in the 1. Lig. This article shows statistics of the club's players in the season, and also lists all matches that the club have played in the season.

== Club ==
=== Board of directors ===
Elected: 25 March 2000

Position	Staff
President	(Turkey) Faruk Süren
2nd President	(Turkey) Mehmet Cansun
Vice President	(Turkey) Ali Dürüst
Board Member	(Turkey) Cem Şaşmaz
Board Member	(Turkey) Doç. Dr. Celal Erkut
Board Member	(Turkey) Osman Hattat
Board Member	(Turkey) Celal Gürcan
Board Member	(Turkey) İbrahim Çağlar
Board Member	(Turkey) Aziz Üstel
Board Member	(Turkey) Burak Elmas

=== Facilities ===
Position	Staff
Stadium	(Turkey) Ali Sami Yen Stadium
Training facility	(Turkey) Florya Metin Oktay Facilities

== Squad statistics ==
No.	Pos.	Name	1. Lig		Türkiye Kupası		Europe		Total	
No.	Pos.	Name	Apps	Goals	Apps	Goals	Apps	Goals	Apps	Goals
1	GK	(Brazil) Claudio Taffarel	27	0	3	0	14	0	44	0
-	GK	(Turkey) Mehmet Bölükbaşı	0	0	0	0	0	0	0	0
16	GK	(Turkey) Kerem İnan	8	0	1	0	3	0	12	0
35	DF	(Brazil) Capone	16	1	2	0	11	1	29	2
4	DF	(Romania) Gheorghe Popescu	24	0	3	0	15	0	42	0
3	DF	(Turkey) Bülent Korkmaz (C)	27	0	2	0	15	1	44	1
14	DF	(Turkey) Fatih Akyel	27	0	4	0	12	0	43	0
26	DF	(Turkey) Emre Aşık	19	1	2	1	5	0	26	2
2	DF	(Turkey) Vedat İnceefe	9	0	2	0	2	0	13	0
57	DF	(Turkey) Hakan Ünsal	15	1	3	0	11	2	29	3
21	MF	(Turkey) Faruk Atalay	13	0	2	0	8	0	23	0
67	MF	(Turkey) Ergün Penbe	27	1	3	0	13	1	43	2
7	MF	(Turkey) Okan Buruk	26	2	3	0	14	0	43	2
11	MF	(Turkey) Hasan Şaş	30	7	4	1	13	2	47	10
18	MF	(Turkey) Ümit Aydın	1	0	0	0	0	0	1	0
8	MF	(Turkey) Suat Kaya	25	1	2	0	13	1	40	2
5	MF	(Turkey) Emre Belözoğlu	27	5	3	4	11	0	41	9
22	MF	(Turkey) Ümit Davala	26	5	4	3	15	2	45	10
10	MF	(Romania) Gheorghe Hagi	25	11	1	0	11	2	37	13
16	MF	(Turkey) Ahmet Yıldırım	11	1	2	0	5	0	18	1
28	MF	(Turkey) Bülent Akın	15	0	1	0	10	1	26	1
36	FW	(Brazil) Márcio Mixirica	5	0	1	0	7	0	13	0
20	FW	(Turkey) Serkan Aykut	26	14	3	3	4	0	33	17
6	FW	(Turkey) Arif Erdem	20	5	3	2	4	0	27	7
9	FW	(Brazil) Mário Jardel	24	22	2	1	17	11	43	34

=== Players in / out ===
==== In ====
Pos.	Nat.	Name	Age	Moving from
FW	(Brazil)	Mário Jardel	26	FC Porto
FW	(Turkey)	Serkan Aykut	25	Samsunspor
DF	(Turkey)	Emre Aşık	27	Istanbulspor
MF	(Turkey)	Bülent Akın	22	Denizlispor
MF	(Turkey)	Arif Erdem	28	Real Sociedad

==== Out ====
Pos.	Nat.	Name	Age	Moving to
FW	(Turkey)	Hakan Şükür	28	Inter Milan
FW	(Turkey)	Arif Erdem	28	Real Sociedad
FW	(Turkey)	Burak Akdiş	23	Kayseri Erciyesspor on loan
MF	(Turkey)	Tolunay Kafkas	32	Denizlispor
DF	(Turkey)	Emrah Eren	21	Istanbulspor on loan
DF	(Brazil)	Bruno Quadros	23	CR Flamengo
MF	(Turkey)	Osman Coşkun	28	K.S.K. Beveren
MF	(Turkey)	Mehmet Gönülaçar	28	K.S.K. Beveren on loan
GK	(Turkey)	Volkan Kilimci	28	KSK Beveren
FW	(Turkey)	Mehmet Yozgatlı	21	Adanaspor
FW	(Turkey)	Saffet Akyüz	30	Çaykur Rizespor on loan

== Friendlies ==
=== Opel Master Cup ===
4 August 2000 Semi final	FC Bayern München	3–1	Galatasaray SK	Munich
	Roque Santa Cruz 9'; Samuel Kuffour 56'; Alexander Zickler 83'	(Report)	Gheorghe Hagi 89'	Stadium: Olympiastadion; Attendance: 28,000

5 August 2000 3rd place	Real Madrid CF	3–2	Galatasaray SK	Munich
	Vedat İnceefe 11' (o.g.); Sávio 51'; Raúl 77'	(Report)	Faruk Atalay 6'; Márcio Mixirica 14'	Stadium: Olympiastadion

=== Atatürk Kupası ===
1 November 2000 1	Beşiktaş JK	2–1	Galatasaray SK	Ankara
21:30 EET	İlhan Şahin 38'; Pascal Nouma 77'	(Report)	Serkan Aykut 90'	Stadium: Ankara 19 Mayıs Stadı; Referee: Metin Tokat

== 1. Lig ==
=== Standings ===
Pos	Team	Pld	W	D	L	GF	GA	GD	Pts	Qualification or relegation
1	Fenerbahçe (C)	34	24	4	6	82	39	+43	76	Qualification to Champions League third qualifying round
2	Galatasaray	34	23	4	7	77	35	+42	73	Qualification to Champions League second qualifying round
3	Gaziantepspor	34	20	8	6	67	40	+27	68	Qualification to UEFA Cup qualifying round
4	Beşiktaş	34	19	7	8	68	48	+20	64	
5	Trabzonspor	34	17	7	10	69	52	+17	58	

Rules for classification: 1) points; 2) goal difference; 3) number of goals scored.
(C) Champions

=== Matches ===
13 August 2000 1	Denizlispor	0–1	Galatasaray SK	Denizli
19:00 EET				Stadium: Denizli Atatürk Stadı; Referee: Mustafa Çulcu

19 August 2000 2	Galatasaray SK	7–0	Erzurumspor	Istanbul
19:00 EET				Stadium: Ali Sami Yen Stadı; Referee: Murat Ilgaz

6 September 2000 3	Bursaspor	0–2	Galatasaray SK	Bursa
20:00 EET				Stadium: Bursa Atatürk Stadı; Referee: Oğuz Sarvan

9 September 2000 4	Galatasaray SK	1–2	Samsunspor	Istanbul
19:00 EET				Stadium: Ali Sami Yen Stadı; Referee: Serdar Tatlı

15 September 2000 5	Kocaelispor	1–4	Galatasaray SK	İzmit
20:00 EET				Stadium: İsmet Paşa Stadium; Referee: Sadık Ilhan

23 September 2000 6	Galatasaray SK	1–1	Istanbulspor	Istanbul
19:00 EET				Stadium: Ali Sami Yen Stadı; Referee: Ismet Cengiz

30 September 2000 7	Gençlerbirliği SK	1–4	Galatasaray SK	Ankara
19:00 EET				Stadium: Ankara 19 Mayıs Stadium; Referee: Oğuz Sarvan

== Türkiye Kupası ==
Kick-off listed in local time (EET)

=== Third round ===
29 November 2000 1	Galatasaray SK	7–0	Vanspor	Istanbul
20:00 EET	Ümit Davala 8'; Arif Erdem 17'; Alpaslan Öztürkci 22' (o.g.); Emre Belözoğlu 29'; Serkan Aykut 41', 63'; Emre Aşık 83'	(Report)		Stadium: Ali Sami Yen Stadı; Referee: Kuddusi Müftüoğlu

=== Fourth round ===
13 December 2000 1	Galatasaray SK	2–1	Adanaspor	Istanbul
20:00 EET	Arif Erdem 29'; Serkan Aykut 89'	(Report)	Cenk İşler 5'	Stadium: Ali Sami Yen Stadı; Referee: Selçuk Dereli

=== Quarter-final ===
31 January 2001 1	Trabzonspor	1–4	Galatasaray SK	Trabzon
19:00 EET	Hami Mandıralı 7'	(Report)	Emre Belözoğlu 6', 67'; Igor Nikolovski 41'; Ümit Davala 84'	Stadium: Hüseyin Avni Aker Stadı; Referee: Serdar Tatlı

=== Semi-final ===
6 February 2001	Fenerbahçe SK	4–4 (a.e.t.) (3–2 p)	Galatasaray	Ankara
20:30 EET	Ogün Temizkanoğlu 22'; Serhat Akın 29'; Samuel Johnson 37'; Haim Revivo 66'	(Report)	Emre Belözoğlu 5'; Hasan Şaş 52'; Mário Jardel 84'; Ümit Davala 90' (pen.)	Stadium: Şükrü Saracoğlu Stadium; Referee: Metin Tokat
	Penalties
	Ogün (penalty scored); Rapaić (penalty scored); Johnson (penalty missed); Lazetić (penalty scored)		(penalty scored) Emre; (penalty missed) Hasan; (penalty missed) Ümit; (penalty scored) Arif; (penalty missed) Jardel

== UEFA Super Cup ==
25 August 2000 Final	Real Madrid (Spain)	1–2 (a.e.t.)	(Turkey) Galatasaray	Monaco
20:45 CEST	Raúl 79' (pen.)	Report 1 Report 2	Jardel 41' (pen.), 103'	Stadium: Stade Louis II; Attendance: 15,000; Referee: Günther Benkö (Austria)

== UEFA Champions League ==
=== Third qualifying round ===
9 August 2000 1	FC St. Gallen	1–2	Galatasaray SK	Zürich
21:45 EET	Charles Amoah 34'	(Report)	Mário Jardel 39', 78'	Stadium: Hardturm; Referee: (Spain) Mejuto Gonzalez

22 August 2000 2	Galatasaray SK	2–2	FC St. Gallen	Istanbul
21:45 EET	Marc Zellweger 23' (o.g.); Mário Jardel 27' (pen.)	(Report)	Ionel Gane 30'; Charles Amoah 87'	Stadium: Ali Sami Yen Stadı; Referee: (Denmark) Knud Erik Fisker

=== First group stage ===
Pos	Team	Pld	W	D	L	GF	GA	GD	Pts	Qualification
1	(Austria) Sturm Graz	6	3	1	2	9	12	−3	10	Advance to second group stage
2	(Turkey) Galatasaray	6	2	2	2	10	13	−3	8	Advance to second group stage
3	(Scotland) Rangers	6	2	2	2	10	7	+3	8	Transfer to UEFA Cup
4	(France) Monaco	6	2	1	3	13	10	+3	7	

Source: UEFA

12 September 2000 1	Galatasaray SK	3–2	AS Monaco	Istanbul
21:45 EET	Mário Jardel 16'; Gheorghe Hagi 29'; Capone 80'	Report	Shabani Nonda 50'; Marco Simone 61' (pen.)	Stadium: Ali Sami Yen Stadı; Referee: (Spain) Arturo Dauden Ibanez

21 September 1999 2	SK Sturm Graz	3–0	Galatasaray SK	Graz
21:45 EET	Sergei Yuran 31'; Markus Schopp 64'; Markus Schupp 82'	Report		Stadium: UPC-Arena; Referee: (Netherlands) Rene Temmink

27 September 2000 3	Galatasaray SK	3–2	Rangers FC	Istanbul
21:45 EET	Bülent Akın 52'; Hakan Ünsal 57'; Mário Jardel 70'	Report	Andrei Kanchelskis 72'; Giovanni van Bronckhorst 90'	Stadium: Ali Sami Yen Stadı; Referee: (Italy) Pierluigi Collina

17 October 2000 4	Rangers FC	0–0	Galatasaray SK	Glasgow
21:45 EET		Report		Stadium: Ibrox Park; Attendance: 49,603; Referee: (Germany) Markus Merk

25 October 2000 5	AS Monaco	4–2	Galatasaray SK	Monaco
21:45 EET	Pablo Contreras 6'; Nicolas Bonnal 19'; Marco Simone 22'; Shabani Nonda 26'	Report	Hakan Ünsal 23'; Bülent Korkmaz 63'	Stadium: Stade Louis II; Referee: (Norway) Rune Pedersen

7 November 2000 6	Galatasaray SK	2–2	SK Sturm Graz	Istanbul
21:45 EET	Ergün Penbe (30o); Mário Jardel 75'	Report	Sergei Yuran 64'; Hakan Ünsal 86' (o.g.)	Stadium: Ali Sami Yen Stadı; Referee: (Sweden) Karl Erik Nilsson

=== Second group stage ===
Pos	Team	Pld	W	D	L	GF	GA	GD	Pts	Qualification
1	(Spain) Deportivo La Coruña	6	3	1	2	10	7	+3	10	Advance to knockout stage
2	(Turkey) Galatasaray	6	3	1	2	6	6	0	10	Advance to knockout stage
3	(Italy) Milan	6	1	4	1	6	7	−1	7	
4	(France) Paris Saint-Germain	6	1	2	3	8	10	−2	5	

Source: UEFA

21 November 2000 1	AC Milan	2–2	Galatasaray SK	Milan
21:45 EET	José Mari 48'; Andriy Shevchenko 73' (pen.)	Report	Mário Jardel 39'; Hasan Şaş 41'	Stadium: San Siro; Referee: (Switzerland) Urs Meier

6 December 2000 2	Galatasaray SK	1–0	Paris Saint-Germain FC	Istanbul
21:45 EET	Ümit Davala 51' (pen.)	Report		Stadium: Ali Sami Yen Stadı; Referee: (Poland) Ryszard Wójcik

14 December 2000 3	Galatasaray SK	1–0	Deportivo de La Coruña	Istanbul
21:45 EET	Suat Kaya 11'	Report		Stadium: Ali Sami Yen Stadı; Attendance: 22,000; Referee: (Denmark) Kim Milton Nielsen

20 February 2001 4	Deportivo de La Coruña	2–0	Galatasaray SK	A Coruña
21:45 EET	Víctor Sánchez 40'; Djalminha 73' (pen.)	Report		Stadium: Estadio Riazor; Referee: (Germany) Hartmut Strampe

7 March 2001 5	Galatasaray SK	2–0	AC Milan	Istanbul
21:45 EET	Gheorghe Hagi 20'; Mário Jardel 86'	Report		Stadium: Ali Sami Yen Stadı; Referee: (Germany) Hellmut Krug

13 March 2001 6	Paris Saint-Germain FC	2–0	Galatasaray SK	Paris
21:45 EET	Christian 3', 27'	Report		Stadium: Parc des Princes; Referee: (Portugal) Vítor Melo Pereira

=== Quarter-finals ===
3 April 2001 1	Galatasaray SK	3–2	Real Madrid CF	Istanbul
21:45 EET	Ümit Davala 47'; Hasan Şaş 66'; Mário Jardel 75'	Report	Iván Helguera 33'; Claude Makélélé 43'	Stadium: Ali Sami Yen Stadı; Attendance: 28,000; Referee: (Italy) Pierluigi Collina

18 April 2001 2	Real Madrid CF	3–0	Galatasaray SK	Madrid
21:45 EET	Raúl 15', 37'; Iván Helguera 28'	Report		Stadium: Santiago Bernabéu Stadium; Attendance: 75,000; Referee: (Sweden) Anders Frisk

== FIFA Club World Championship ==
=== Group stage ===
Group B

- (Saudi Arabia) Al-Hilal
- (Turkey) Galatasaray
- (Honduras) Olimpia
- (Brazil) Palmeiras

29 July 2001 1	Galatasaray SK (Turkey)	v	(Saudi Arabia) Al-Hilal	Madrid
20:00 CET				Stadium: Vicente Calderón Stadium

2 August 2001 2	Olimpia (Honduras)	v	(Turkey) Galatasaray SK	Madrid
19:30 CET				Stadium: Vicente Calderón Stadium

5 August 2001 3	Palmeiras (Brazil)	v	(Turkey) Galatasaray SK	Madrid
22:00 CET				Stadium: Vicente Calderón Stadium

== Attendance ==
Competition	Av. Att.	Total Att.
1. Lig	-	-
Türkiye Kupası	-	-
Champions League	20,643	144,500
Total	-	-
