= 2000 Atatürk Cup =

#heavenking_4u_yt

The 2000 Atatürk Cup was a single football match contested between Turkish domestic cup winners and rivals Beşiktaş J.K. and Galatasaray S.K. Beşiktaş won the game 2-1. This was the fourth and final edition of the Atatürk Cup.

== Match details ==
1 Kasım 2000
19:00

Galatasaray S.K.	1–2	Beşiktaş J.K.
Serkan Aykut 90'		38' İlhan Şahin; 77' Pascal Nouma

Referee: Metin Tokat

GALATASARAY:		
16	Kerem İnan	
4	Gheorghe Popescu	
7	Okan Buruk	
8	Suat Kaya	
20	Serkan Aykut	
21	Faruk Atalay	
26	Emre Aşık	
28	Bülent Akın	(substituted off) 28'
35	Capone	
36	Marcio	(substituted off) 46'
67	Ergün Penbe	(substituted off) 34'
Reserves		
6	Ahmet Yıldırım	(substituted on) 28'
2	Vedat İnceefe	(substituted on) 34'
11	Hasan Şaş	(substituted on) 46'

BEŞİKTAŞ:		
22	Fevzi Tuncay	
6	Rahim Zafer	
13	Bayram Bektaş	
16	Dmitriy Hlestov	
17	Erman Güraçar	(substituted off) 80'
18	Ayhan Akman	(substituted off) 87'
20	Murat Alaçayır	
23	Tunç Kip	
24	İlhan Şahin	
27	Jamal Sellami	
21	Pascal Nouma	
Reserves		
19	İbrahim Üzülmez	(substituted on) 80'
25	Salih Akkaya	(substituted on) 87'
