= Emre Belözoğlu =

Turkish football manager (born 1980)

- Emre Belözoğlu

Personal information
- Full name: Emre Belözoğlu
- Date of birth: 7 September 1980 (age 46)
- Place of birth: Istanbul, Turkey
- Height: 1.70 m (5 ft 7 in)
- Position: Midfielder

Team information
- Current team: Fenerbahçe (head coach)

Youth career
- 1989–1992: Zeytinburnuspor
- 1992–1996: Galatasaray

Senior career*
Years	Team	Apps	(Gls)
1996–2001	Galatasaray	102	(14)
2001–2005	Inter Milan	79	(3)
2005–2008	Newcastle United	58	(5)
2008–2012	Fenerbahçe	103	(12)
2012–2013	Atlético Madrid	7	(1)
2013–2015	Fenerbahçe	56	(14)
2015–2019	İstanbul Başakşehir	104	(11)
2019–2020	Fenerbahçe	26	(3)
Total		531	(60)

International career
1994–1995	Turkey U15	11	(7)
1995–1997	Turkey U16	35	(20)
1996–1997	Turkey U17	7	(2)
1997–1998	Turkey U18	6	(0)
1998–1999	Turkey U21	12	(4)
2000–2019	Turkey	101	(9)

Managerial career
- 2021: Fenerbahçe
- 2021–2023: İstanbul Başakşehir
- 2023–2024: Ankaragücü
- 2025: Antalyaspor
- 2025–2026: Kasımpaşa
- 2026–: Fenerbahçe
Medal record
Representing Turkey
Men's Football
FIFA World Cup
Third place	2002 Korea/Japan
UEFA European Championship
Bronze medal – third place	2008 Austria & Switzerland
- * Club domestic league appearances and goals

Emre Belözoğlu (Turkish pronunciation: [emˈɾe beˈlœzoːɫu], born 7 September 1980), simply known as Emre, is a Turkish football manager and former professional footballer who is currently head coach of Fenerbahçe.

A left-footed, tempo-setting midfielder most often used as a central midfielder or advanced playmaker, he came through the Galatasaray academy and debuted for the first team at 16, winning four consecutive Süper Lig titles, two Turkish Cups, the UEFA Cup (1999–2000) and the UEFA Super Cup (2000).

In 2001 he moved to Inter Milan for £5 million, was voted the club’s Pirata d'Oro (player of the year) in 2002–03 and reached the UEFA Champions League semi-finals. He later played for Newcastle United, had three spells with Fenerbahçe (winning the Süper Lig in 2010–11 and 2013–14, the 2012–13 Turkish Cup and the 2014 Turkish Super Cup), joined Atlético Madrid briefly in 2012, and captained İstanbul Başakşehir from 2015 to 2019 before returning to Fenerbahçe for a final season and retiring in 2020.

Internationally, Belözoğlu earned 101 caps and scored 9 goals for Turkey between 2000 and 2019. He was part of the squad that finished third at the 2002 FIFA World Cup and reached the semi-finals of UEFA Euro 2008, and is a member of the FIFA 100, the list of the world’s greatest living footballers selected by Pelé for FIFA’s centenary.

After retiring, he became Fenerbahçe’s director of football in October 2020 and served as the club’s interim head coach for the final ten league matches of the 2020–21 season. He subsequently managed İstanbul Başakşehir (securing European qualification and reaching the Turkish Cup final), Ankaragücü (relegated on the final day of 2023–24), and Antalyaspor, where he briefly resigned in June 2025 before the decision was reversed and he was confirmed to continue into 2025–26.

== Club career ==
=== Early years ===
Born in Istanbul’s Zeytinburnu district, Belözoğlu was introduced to football by his father, Mehmet, an amateur player who took him to the Zeytinburnuspor training ground. His mother, Fatma, having witnessed the difficulties her husband faced in the game, initially opposed a professional career, but his father encouraged him to pursue it.

At Zeytinburnuspor, coach Salih Bulgurlu identified his talent, praising his control with his left foot and giving him individual training for four years to refine his technique, fitness and stamina. His progress quickly drew wider attention. Former Galatasaray player and coach Bülent Ünder a close friend of then Galatasaray manager Fatih Terim recommended that Belözoğlu be taken into Galatasaray’s academy, which he duly joined in 1996. Ünder is reported to have told Bulgurlu:

Wait and see. In two years, this teenager will be playing proudly within the battlegrounds of Europe.

Belözoğlu represented Turkey at youth level from under-15 through under-21 before breaking into Galatasaray’s first team as a 16-year-old during the 1996–97.

=== Galatasaray ===
Belözoğlu came through Galatasaray’s youth system and was promoted to the senior squad in the 1996–97 season at the age of 16. He broke into the first team the following year under Fatih Terim, and between 1996 and 2001 made over 100 competitive appearances for the club.

During this period he was part of Galatasaray’s most successful modern era, winning four consecutive Süper Lig titles (1996–97, 1997–98, 1998–99, 1999–2000), two Turkish Cups (1998–99, 1999–2000), the 1999–2000 UEFA Cup, and the 2000 UEFA Super Cup against Real Madrid.

He also featured in the 2000–01 UEFA Champions League, including the quarter-final tie against Real Madrid in April 2001. Deployed primarily as a left-footed central midfielder, he was noted for his press resistance, intensity out of possession and ability to progress the ball through tight spaces, often forming part of a midfield unit with Gheorghe Hagi, Okan Buruk, Suat Kaya and Tugay Kerimoğlu under Terim.

Regarded domestically as one of the leading Turkish prospects of his generation, Belözoğlu left Galatasaray in the summer of 2001 to join Inter Milan for a reported multi-million euro fee.

=== Inter Milan ===
Belözoğlu moved to Inter Milan in July 2001. Across four seasons he made 115 competitive appearances and scored 5 goals for the Nerazzurri, playing under Héctor Cúper, Alberto Zaccheroni and Roberto Mancini. His standout year came in 2002–03, when he made 37 appearances in all competitions and was voted the Pirata d’Oro (Inter’s player of the year), becoming the 17th recipient of the award. That season Inter reached the UEFA Champions League semi-finals, losing to AC Milan on away goals.

From 2003–04 onward, a series of injuries curtailed his minutes and he gradually fell out of favour; in 2004–05 he made only 19 appearances before being made available for transfer at season’s end. Despite limited appearances, he was part of the Inter squad that won the Coppa Italia in the 2004–05 season under manager Roberto Mancini. He left the club in the summer of 2005 and subsequently signed with Newcastle United in the Premier League.

=== Newcastle United ===
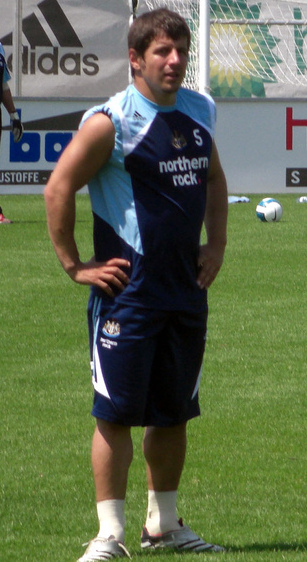
Emre in 2007

On 19 July 2005, Belözoğlu moved to Newcastle United on a five-year deal for a £3.8 million transfer fee. He made his debut on 3 August in a 2–1 home defeat to Deportivo La Coruña in the UEFA Intertoto Cup, and 11 days later on 3 August 2005, he started in Newcastle's first game of the Premier League season, a defeat to Arsenal. In his fourth game, on 23 October, he assisted the opener for Shola Ameobi from a corner and then scored the winner with a free kick in a 3–2 victory over Sunderland in the Tyne–Wear derby. On 28 January 2006, he made his FA Cup debut as a substitute, against Cheltenham in a 2-0 away win.

He finished his first season with 25 appearances in all competitions (20 in the league) and two Premier League goals, adding a second with a long-range strike in a 1–0 win over Birmingham City on 5 November.

Across the following two seasons, persistent injuries limited Belözoğlu to 35 Premier League appearances and three goals. On 17 January 2008, in an FA Cup replay against Stoke City, he was sent off after 29 minutes for retaliating following a foul by John Eustace. He left the club at the end of the 2007–08 season.

=== Fenerbahçe (2008–2012) ===
In July 2008, Belözoğlu joined Fenerbahçe on a free transfer after leaving Newcastle United, and was unveiled at the Şükrü Saracoğlu Stadium in a public signing ceremony. The move caused controversy among sections of Galatasaray supporters due to his formative years there, though Belözoğlu stated he had supported Fenerbahçe since childhood, a claim later echoed in Turkish media by former teammates Hakan Şükür and Hasan Şaş.

His first 2008–09 season, under Luis Aragonés, was stop–start due to recurring muscle injuries and Fenerbahçe finished fourth in the Süper Lig. In 2009–10, with Christoph Daum back in charge, Belözoğlu’s form and availability improved markedly; he became one of the side’s key midfielders as Fenerbahçe finished runners-up in the league and reached the Turkish Cup final.

In 2010–11, under newly appointed head coach Aykut Kocaman, Belözoğlu played a central role in Fenerbahçe’s dominant second half of the season as the club won the league title, finishing ahead of Trabzonspor on goal difference. Fenerbahçe were subsequently withdrawn by the TFF from the following season’s UEFA Champions League amid the 2011 Turkish match-fixing investigation, a decision that defined much of the discourse around the squad that summer.

Belözoğlu added the 2011–12 Turkish Cup Fenerbahçe’s first since 1982–83 again under Kocaman, while the team finished second in the league’s newly introduced play-off format behind Galatasaray. Over his first spell with the club, he made over 100 competitive appearances and reached double figures in goals, operating primarily as a left-footed central midfielder noted for his tempo control, pressing intensity and set-piece delivery.

On 1 June 2012, after the expiry of his contract, Belözoğlu signed for Atlético Madrid on a free transfer, ending his first stint at Fenerbahçe. Across his first spell (2008–2012), Belözoğlu made 141 competitive appearances and scored 16 goals for Fenerbahçe, won 2010–11 Süper Lig, 2011–12 and 2012–13 Turkish Cup.

=== Atlético Madrid ===
On 29 May 2012, Belözoğlu joined Atlético Madrid, then the reigning UEFA Europa League champions, on a two-year contract, reuniting with compatriot Arda Turan. He trained with his new teammates on 7 July and was presented at the Vicente Calderón Stadium shortly afterwards.

Belözoğlu made his competitive debut on 1 September 2012 in the 2012 UEFA Super Cup against Chelsea, coming on for the last minutes in place of Radamel Falcao as Atlético won 4–1. Used sparingly by Diego Simeone amid competition from Gabi, Mario Suárez, Tiago, Koke and Arda Turan, and hindered by minor injuries, he totaled seven competitive appearances (four in La Liga, two in the Copa del Rey, and one in the Super Cup) without scoring.

On 31 January 2013, midway through the season, he returned to Fenerbahçe on a free transfer (undisclosed terms). Atlético went on to win the 2012–13 Copa del Rey in May 2013, though Belözoğlu had already departed by the time of the final.

=== Fenerbahçe (second spell) ===
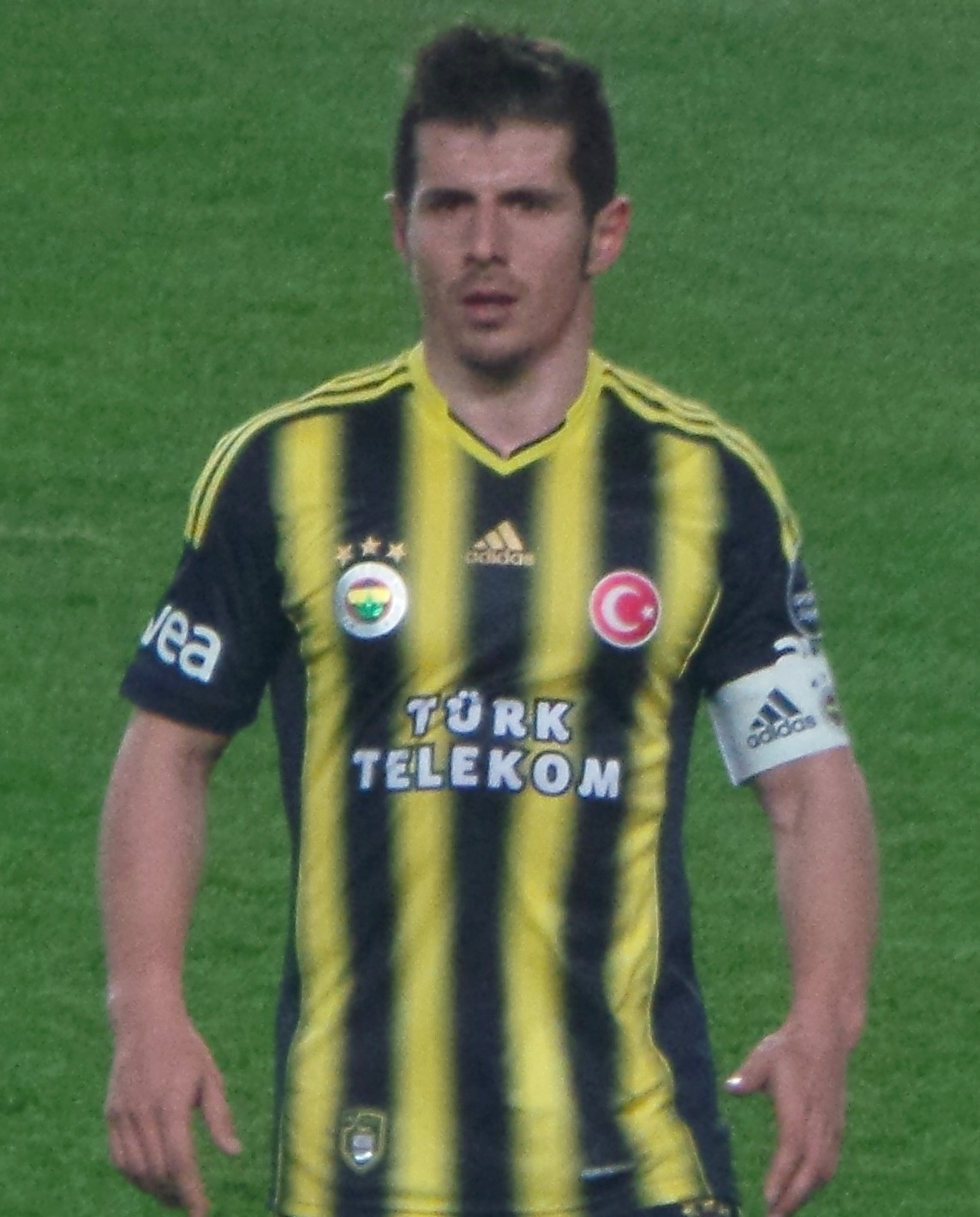
Emre Belözoğlu in 2014

On 31 January 2013, Belözoğlu returned to Fenerbahçe on a two-and-a-half-year contract. He made his second debut against Sivasspor in the Süper Lig. Fenerbahçe finished 2012–13 as league runners-up but won the Turkish Cup, with Belözoğlu featuring during the run to the final against Trabzonspor. He also appeared in the club’s run to the UEFA Europa League semi-finals, where Fenerbahçe were eliminated by Benfica.

In 2013–14, under head coach Ersun Yanal, he was a regular starter and part of the leadership group as Fenerbahçe won the 2013–14 Süper Lig title by nine points. The following season (2014–15), now under İsmail Kartal, he captained the side in stretches of the campaign, won the 2014 Turkish Super Cup on penalties against Galatasaray, and finished second in the league.

Across his second spell (2013–2015), Belözoğlu made 63 competitive appearances and scored 14 goals for Fenerbahçe, won 2013–14 Süper Lig and 2014.

=== İstanbul Başakşehir ===
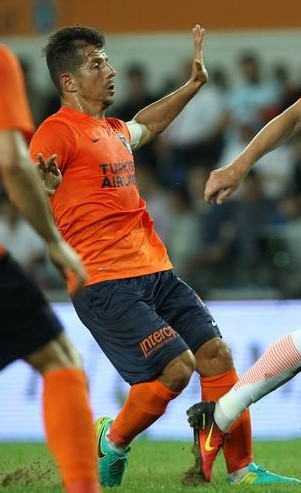
Emre Belözoğlu in 2016

On 7 July 2015, Belözoğlu signed a two-year contract with İstanbul Başakşehir ahead of the 2015–16 season, joining on a free transfer after leaving Fenerbahçe. He immediately became club captain under head coach Abdullah Avcı.

In his first season, Başakşehir finished fourth in the Süper Lig and qualified for the UEFA Europa League. The following campaign, 2016–17, they finished runners-up behind Beşiktaş and reached the Turkish Cup final, losing to Konyaspor on penalties; Belözoğlu started the match and captained the side. In Europe that season, Başakşehir were eliminated by Shakhtar Donetsk in the UEFA Europa League play-off round; Belözoğlu played both legs.

Başakşehir finished third in 2017–18, narrowly missing the title in a four-way race with Galatasaray, Fenerbahçe and Beşiktaş, with Belözoğlu again a regular starter in central midfield. Before the start of the 2018–19 campaign he announced that he planned to retire at the end of the season, but subsequently reversed that decision, stating he wished to play once more for Fenerbahçe, his boyhood club. That season Başakşehir led the league for long stretches but finished second, two points behind Galatasaray.

Across four seasons with Başakşehir, Belözoğlu made 130+ competitive appearances and scored in double figures, serving as the team’s on-field organiser and primary set-piece taker. He left the club on 2 July 2019 and rejoined Fenerbahçe on a free transfer, signing a one-year deal.

=== Fenerbahçe (third spell) and retirement ===
On 2 July 2019, Belözoğlu signed a one-year deal with Fenerbahçe. He made his first appearance of the season on 19 August 2019, captaining the team and scoring a 24th-minute penalty in a 5–0 home win over Gaziantep F.K. in the Süper Lig.

After the league’s COVID-19 suspension, he returned to score another penalty in the 81st minute of a 1–1 draw away to Gençlerbirliği on 7 July 2020, earning Fenerbahçe a point in week 31. On 25 July 2020, he played the final match of his playing career, scoring a 39th-minute penalty in a 3–1 home victory over Çaykur Rizespor at Şükrü Saracoğlu Stadium. Following his final match, he published a farewell letter on Fenerbahçe’s official website, thanking his former clubs, teammates, family and the club’s supporters, writing that “every farewell is certainly a new beginning”.

He finished the 2019–20 season with 29 league appearances, 3 goals. On 28 October 2020, Fenerbahçe announced that Belözoğlu had retired from professional football and was appointed the club’s director of football, overseeing the 2020–21 summer transfer window.

== International career ==
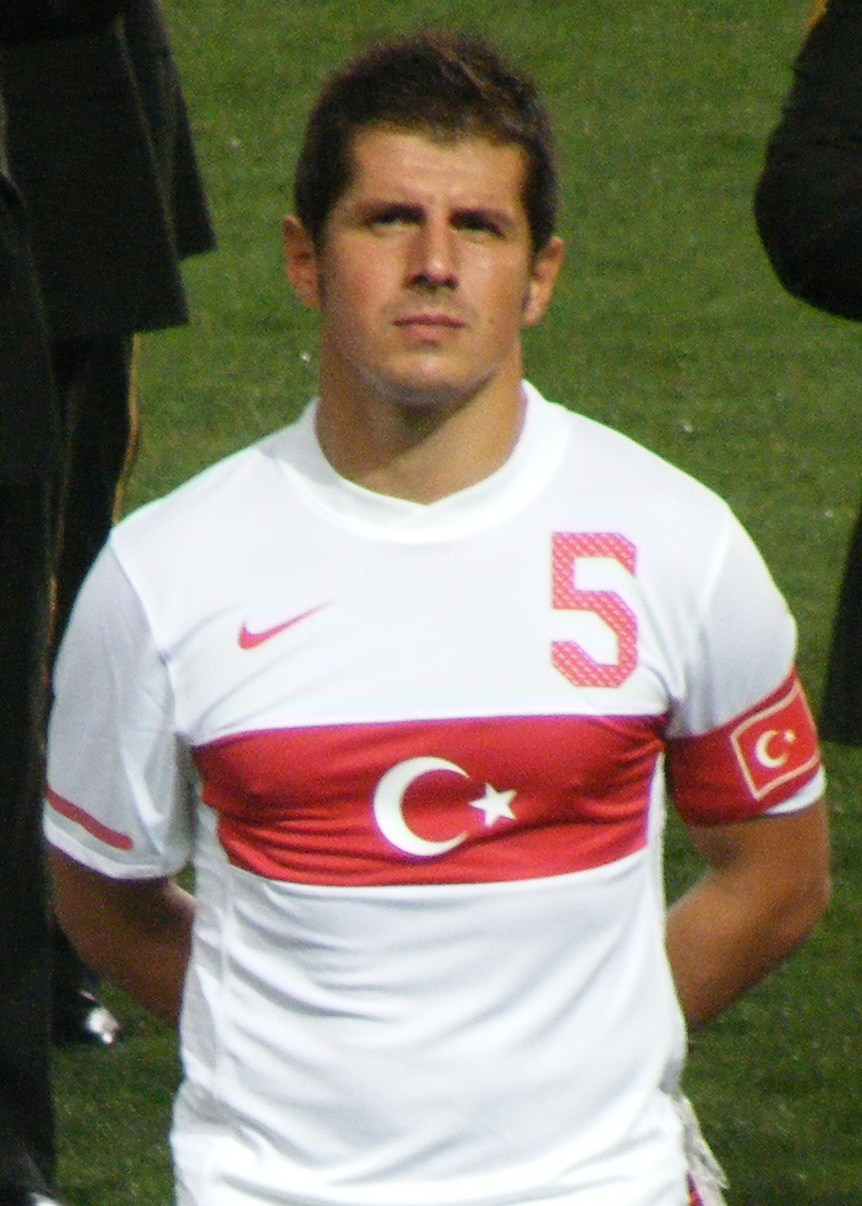
Emre Belözoğlu (against Romania) in 2010

Belözoğlu made his senior debut for Turkey in 2000 against Norway. An injury ruled him out of UEFA Euro 2000, but he was part of the squad that finished third at the 2002 FIFA World Cup under Şenol Güneş. He featured regularly through the 2002–03 cycle before further muscular problems reduced his international minutes during the mid-2000s.

Belözoğlu started Turkey’s opening game of UEFA Euro 2008 against Portugal, but a subsequent injury sidelined him for the remainder of the tournament, in which Turkey reached the semi-finals. Through the 2010s he was called up intermittently, captaining the side on numerous occasions in qualifiers for the 2014 FIFA World Cup, UEFA Euro 2012 and UEFA Euro 2016.

On 7 September 2019, during the UEFA Euro 2020 qualifying campaign, Belözoğlu won his 100th cap in a 1–0 win over Andorra, becoming one of a small group of Turkish players to reach the century mark. He had indicated that he would end his international career after UEFA Euro 2020, but when the tournament was postponed to 2021 because of the COVID-19 pandemic, he did not return to the squad and effectively finished with 101 caps later in 2019. He played his final internationals later that year and concluded his Turkey career with 101 caps and 9 goals.

== Managerial career ==
=== Fenerbahçe ===
==== Sporting Director ====
After his retirement, on 28 October 2020, Fenerbahçe announced that Belözoğlu had been appointed director of football to the first team, overseeing the 2020–21 summer transfer window from August to October. As sporting director in the 2020–21 season, Belözoğlu rebuilt the squad with a heavy emphasis on free transfers due to budget constraints. During his spell as Fenerbahçe’s director of football, Belözoğlu became the public face of the club’s recruitment drive. Turkish media reported that he personally phoned several transfer targets to persuade them to sign, and the phrase “Alo, ben Emre abin” (“Hello, it’s your big brother Emre”) spread on social media as shorthand for his persuasive style, especially during the signings of Mesut Özil, İrfan Can Kahveci, Attila Szalai and Bright Osayi-Samuel.

==== Interim Head Coach ====
On 25 March 2021, after manager Erol Bulut left by mutual consent, Belözoğlu was named interim head coach for the final ten Süper Lig matchdays of the season. On 5 April 2021, his first match as a manager ended in a 1–0 win over Denizlispor in the Süper Lig. Fenerbahçe finished the season third, two points behind Beşiktaş, with Belözoğlu recording 7 wins, 2 draws and 1 loss in his 10 league games in charge. His only defeat came in a 2–1 loss to Sivasspor on 11 May 2021; as Fenerbahçe finished the season two points behind champions Beşiktaş, a victory in that fixture would have secured the title. On 1 June 2021, president Ali Koç announced he would not continue beyond the interim period, and on 2 June the club made his departure official.

=== İstanbul Başakşehir ===
On 4 October 2021, Emre Belözoğlu signed a two-year contract to take over İstanbul Başakşehir, following the resignation of Aykut Kocaman. Returning to the club he had previously captained for four seasons as a player, Belözoğlu began his managerial tenure with a 3–2 home victory over Beşiktaş on 15 October. When he took charge, Başakşehir were languishing near the bottom of the Süper Lig standings. Under his leadership, the team climbed the table dramatically and finished the 2021–22 season in 4th place, thereby securing a spot in European competition. His debut season was widely praised for his tactical clarity and ability to quickly turn around a demoralized squad.

In the 2022–23 season, Belözoğlu continued to build on that foundation. He guided Başakşehir to the final of the Turkish Cup and achieved a respectable 5th-place finish in the league, maintaining the club’s European ambitions. His team was also praised for its organized midfield structure and dynamic transition play. However, the start of the 2023–24 campaign was far from ideal. Başakşehir lost all of their first three league matches and failed to score a single point. Despite the previous success, the pressure quickly mounted. Following another disappointing result in the fourth week, Belözoğlu stepped down as manager. On 6 September 2023, his resignation was officially confirmed.

=== Ankaragücü ===
On 5 October 2023, Belözoğlu was appointed head coach of Ankaragücü, replacing Tolunay Kafkas. He took over after matchday 7, with the team on 6 points (1 win, 3 draws, 3 losses). On 7 October 2023, in his first match in charge, Ankaragücü defeated Kayserispor 3–0, lifting the club to 12th place on 9 points. Form remained inconsistent throughout the league campaign, but Belözoğlu guided Ankaragücü to the Turkish Cup semi-finals, where they were eliminated by Beşiktaş 1–0 on aggregate (0–0, 0–1). In the league run-in, Ankaragücü won only four of their final 19 matches and, despite spending most of the campaign outside the relegation zone, entered the last matchday just a point clear; after leading 2–1 away to Trabzonspor into the closing minutes, they conceded late, dropped to 17th on 40 points and were relegated an outcome widely regarded as unexpected and a major disappointment for the club and its supporters. Belözoğlu left the club on 31 May 2024. Across 38 competitive matches, he recorded 12 wins, 14 draws, and 12 defeats.

=== Antalyaspor ===
On 14 January 2025, Belözoğlu was appointed head coach of Antalyaspor on an 18-month deal, replacing Alex de Souza, who had left the post the previous day. Belözoğlu’s tenure was short and turbulent. In 20 competitive matches (18 in the Süper Lig, 2 in the Turkish Cup), his side recorded 6 wins, 5 draws and 9 defeats, collecting 23 points for an average of 1.15 points per match. The team was eliminated from the Turkish Cup after two defeats, and finished the 2024–25 Süper Lig in 15th place. On 25 June 2025, Belözoğlu announced his resignation, stating that the club’s prevailing circumstances had made it impossible for him to continue in the role. On 29 June 2025, it was officially confirmed that Belözoğlu would continue as head coach for the 2025–26 season, with his resignation reversed.

=== Kasımpaşa ===
On 4 December 2025, Belözoğlu was appointed head coach of Kasımpaşa until the end of 2026-27 season, following the club parting of ways with Shota Arveladze.

=== Fenerbahçe ===
On 3 November 2026, he was appointed head coach of Fenerbahçe.

== Style of play ==
A left-footed and highly versatile midfielder, Belözoğlu was used across the middle of the pitch as a central midfielder, an advanced playmaker (no. 10), a deeper-lying regista, and occasionally on the left side. He was noted for his tight close control under pressure, low centre of gravity, press resistance, short- and long-range passing, and ability to dictate the tempo of games.

Combative and intense out of possession, he combined ball-winning aggression with playmaking, regularly acting as the first passer in build-up while also leading the press. Throughout his career he was a primary set-piece taker (corners, free kicks and penalties) and a vocal on-field leader; he captained both Fenerbahçe and the Turkey national team on numerous occasions.

Early in his career with Galatasaray and Inter Milan, he was typically deployed higher up as a creative midfielder, carrying the ball through tight spaces and linking with forwards. From his late 20s onward—particularly under Aykut Kocaman at Fenerbahçe and Abdullah Avcı at İstanbul Başakşehir—he was increasingly fielded deeper, orchestrating play from the base of midfield and managing game rhythm.

Analysts frequently highlighted his tactical intelligence, scanning and body orientation before receiving, and his capacity to progress possession with disguised passes between the lines, while also noting that recurrent muscular injuries reduced his athletic burst and top-end pace after the mid-2000s.

== Personal life ==
Belözoğlu married Tuğba Gürevin on 2 January 2009 in Istanbul; the ceremony at Swissotel The Bosphorus was officiated by Istanbul mayor Kadir Topbaş, with Recep Tayyip Erdoğan among the witnesses. Belözoğlu is reported to speak Turkish, English, Italian and Spanish. On his mother’s side, he is a cousin of Turkish folk singer Volkan Konak; Belözoğlu publicly mourned Konak following his death in 2025.

== Controversies ==
=== Post-match brawl vs Switzerland (2005) ===
Following the brawl after Turkey’s 2006 FIFA World Cup play-off second leg against the Switzerland on 16 November 2005, Belözoğlu was suspended for six competitive internationals and fined CHF 15,000 plus CHF 1,000 costs. Turkey were also ordered to play three competitive home matches behind closed doors on neutral ground. On appeal, FIFA’s Appeal Committee reduced Belözoğlu’s individual ban to four matches.

=== Transfer to Newcastle United and the Stevens Inquiry (2005–2007) ===
Belözoğlu’s 2005 transfer from Inter Milan to Newcastle United was among the deals the 2007 Stevens (Quest) Inquiry declined to clear, stating it was unable to obtain the cooperation of the lead agent, Ahmet Bulut; the report did not allege proven wrongdoing.

=== Racism allegations in England (2006–2007) ===
In January 2007 the FA charged Belözoğlu with using racially aggravated language in a match against Everton on 30 December 2006; he denied the allegation, and in March 2007 an independent FA Commission ruled the charge not proved. The FA also looked into further claims made by El-Hadji Diouf (then of Bolton Wanderers) and later Alhassan Bangura (Watford); no charge was ultimately sustained.

=== Racial abuse case in Turkey (2012–2014) ===
On 15 April 2012, after a Süper Lig match between Trabzonspor and Fenerbahçe, Didier Zokora accused Belözoğlu of using a racist slur; Belözoğlu denied racism. The PFDK issued a two-match ban for “insult”, not racism, a sanction later adjusted by the Tahkim Kurulu. In June 2014, a Turkish criminal court found him guilty of “insult” over the incident and handed down a suspended prison sentence of two months and 15 days; the announcement of the verdict was deferred, citing his lack of prior conviction and low risk of reoffending.

=== John Obi Mikel row (2020) ===
After Trabzonspor’s 2–1 win over Fenerbahçe on 2 February 2020, John Obi Mikel said Belözoğlu insulted him and his family; Belözoğlu denied the allegation. Trabzonspor later filed a criminal complaint over racist abuse Mikel received on social media from opposition fans.

=== FETÖ investigation (2020) ===
In 2020, the Istanbul Chief Public Prosecutor’s Office opened an investigation into claims that Belözoğlu had links to the FETÖ, but later issued a decision of non-prosecution, ruling that attending sohbet meetings and donating money were insufficient to prove membership of the organisation. Earlier media reports had alleged he attended movement-linked meetings during his playing career, and quoted Fatih Terim as having warned him to cut ties; Belözoğlu has not been convicted of any related offence.

== Career statistics ==
=== Club ===
Appearances and goals by club, season and competition
Club	Season	League			National cup (Note: Includes Turkish Cup, Coppa Italia, FA Cup, Copa del Rey)		League cup (Note: Includes Football League Cup)		Europe		Other		Total	
Club	Season	Division	Apps	Goals	Apps	Goals	Apps	Goals	Apps	Goals	Apps	Goals	Apps	Goals
Galatasaray	1996–97	1.Lig	1	0	0	0	—		0	0	0	0	1	0
Galatasaray	1997–98	1.Lig	23	2	8	0	—		2 (Note: Appearances in UEFA Champions League)	0	1 (Note: Appearance in Turkish Super Cup)	0	34	2
Galatasaray	1998–99	1.Lig	27	2	6	2	—		2	0	—		35	4
Galatasaray	1999–2000	1.Lig	24	5	4	0	—		13 (Note: Six appearances in UEFA Champions League, seven appearances and one goal in UEFA Cup)	1	—		41	6
Galatasaray	2000–01	1.Lig	27	5	3	5	—		10	0	1 (Note: Appearance in UEFA Super Cup)	0	41	10
Galatasaray	Total		102	14	21	7	—		27	1	2	0	152	22
Inter Milan	2001–02	Serie A	14	0	0	0	—		6 (Note: Appearances in UEFA Cup)	0	—		20	0
Inter Milan	2002–03	Serie A	25	3	0	0	—		12	1	—		37	4
Inter Milan	2003–04	Serie A	21	0	3	0	—		6 (Note: Four appearances in UEFA Champions League, two appearances in UEFA Cup)	0	—		30	0
Inter Milan	2004–05	Serie A	19	0	2	1	—		6	0	—		27	1
Inter Milan	Total		79	3	5	1	—		30	1	0	0	114	5
Newcastle United	2005–06	Premier League	20	2	3	0	1	0	1 (Note: Appearance in UEFA Intertoto Cup)	0	—		25	2
Newcastle United	2006–07	Premier League	24	2	0	0	2	0	12	1	—		38	3
Newcastle United	2007–08	Premier League	14	1	1	0	2	0	—		—		17	1
Newcastle United	Total		58	5	4	0	5	0	13	1	—		80	6
Fenerbahçe	2008–09	Süper Lig	25	1	6	0	—		9	1	—		40	2
Fenerbahçe	2009–10	Süper Lig	25	1	7	0	—		8 (Note: Appearances in UEFA Europa League)	1	1	0	41	2
Fenerbahçe	2010–11	Süper Lig	27	4	1	0	—		4	2	—		32	6
Fenerbahçe	2011–12	Süper Lig	26	6	2	0	—		—		0	0	28	6
Fenerbahçe	Total		103	12	16	0	—		21	4	1	0	141	16
Atlético Madrid	2012–13	La Liga	7	1	3	0	—		6	1	1	0	17	2
Fenerbahçe	2012–13	Süper Lig	10	2	2	0	—		—		—		12	2
Fenerbahçe	2013–14	Süper Lig	20	6	0	0	—		2	0	1	0	23	6
Fenerbahçe	2014–15	Süper Lig	26	6	1	0	—		—		1	0	28	6
Fenerbahçe	Total		56	14	3	0	—		2	0	2	0	63	14
İstanbul Başakşehir	2015–16	Süper Lig	26	3	2	0	—		2	0	—		30	3
İstanbul Başakşehir	2016–17	Süper Lig	27	4	5	1	—		4	1	—		36	6
İstanbul Başakşehir	2017–18	Süper Lig	27	3	1	0	—		7 (Note: Four appearances in UEFA Champions League, three appearances and two goals in UEFA Europa League)	2	—		35	5
İstanbul Başakşehir	2018–19	Süper Lig	24	1	1	0	—		2	0	—		27	1
İstanbul Başakşehir	Total		104	11	9	1	—		15	3	—		128	15
Fenerbahçe	2019–20	Süper Lig	26	3	0	0	—		—		—		26	3
Career total			531	60	61	9	5	0	114	11	6	0	717	81

=== International ===
Appearances and goals by national team and year
National team	Year	Apps	Goals
Turkey	2000	4	1
Turkey	2001	5	0
Turkey	2002	13	2
Turkey	2003	7	0
Turkey	2004	7	0
Turkey	2005	7	0
Turkey	2006	1	0
Turkey	2007	8	1
Turkey	2008	7	1
Turkey	2009	6	1
Turkey	2010	9	1
Turkey	2011	6	1
Turkey	2012	9	1
Turkey	2013	2	0
Turkey	2014	2	0
Turkey	2015	0	0
Turkey	2016	0	0
Turkey	2017	1	0
Turkey	2018	0	0
Turkey	2019	6	0
Total		101	9

Scores and results list Turkey's goal tally first, score column indicates score after each Emre goal.

List of international goals scored by Emre Belözoğlu
No.	Date	Venue	Opponent	Score	Result	Competition
1	2 September 2000	Istanbul, Turkey	Moldova	2–0	2–0	2002 FIFA World Cup qualification
2	9 June 2002	Incheon, South Korea	Costa Rica	1–0	1–1	2002 FIFA World Cup
3	20 November 2002	Pescara, Italy	Italy		1–1	Friendly
4	17 November 2007	Oslo, Norway	Norway	1–1	2–1	UEFA Euro 2008 qualification
5	10 September 2008	Istanbul, Turkey	Belgium		1–1	2010 FIFA World Cup qualification
6	9 September 2009	Zenica, Bosnia Herzegovina	Bosnia and Herzegovina	1–0	1–1	2010 FIFA World Cup qualification
7	11 August 2010	Istanbul, Turkey	Romania		2–0	Friendly
8	10 August 2011	Istanbul, Turkey	Estonia	1–0	3–0	Friendly
9	11 September 2012	Istanbul, Turkey	Estonia		1–0	2014 FIFA World Cup qualification

=== Managerial record ===
As of match played 21 November 2026

Managerial record by team and tenure
Team	Nat	From	To	Record							
Team	Nat	From	To	G	W	D	L	GF	GA	GD	Win %
Fenerbahçe (a.i.)	(Turkey)	25 March 2021	31 May 2021	10	7	2	1	18	10	+8	70.00
İstanbul Başakşehir	(Turkey)	3 October 2021	3 September 2023	90	46	23	21	142	90	+52	51.11
Ankaragücü	(Turkey)	3 October 2023	31 May 2024	38	12	14	12	53	46	+7	31.58
Antalyaspor	(Turkey)	14 January 2025	8 October 2025	28	9	6	13	27	43	−16	32.14
Kasımpaşa	(Turkey)	5 December 2025	3 November 2026	31	10	12	9	37	39	−2	32.26
Fenerbahçe	(Turkey)	3 Noviembre 2026	present	3	2	1	0	10	4	+6	66.67
Total				200	86	58	56	287	233	+54	43.00

== Honours ==
=== Player ===
Galatasaray

- Süper Lig: 1996–97, 1997–98, 1998–99, 1999–2000
- Turkish Cup: 1998–99, 1999–2000
- Presidential Cup: 1997
- UEFA Cup: 1999–2000
- UEFA Super Cup: 2000

Inter Milan

- Coppa Italia: 2004–05

Newcastle United

- UEFA Intertoto Cup: 2006

Fenerbahçe

- Süper Lig: 2010–11, 2013–14
- Turkish Cup: 2011–12, 2012–13
- Turkish Super Cup: 2009, 2014

Atlético Madrid

- UEFA Super Cup: 2012

İstanbul Başakşehir

- Turkish Cup runner-up: 2016–17
- Süper Lig runner-up: 2016–17, 2018–19; third place: 2015–16, 2017–18

Turkey

- 2002 FIFA World Cup: third place
- UEFA Euro semi-finalist: 2008

Individual

- FIFA 100
- Pirata d'Oro (Inter Milan Player of the Year): 2002–03

Orders

- Turkish State Medal of Distinguished Service: 2002

=== Manager ===
İstanbul Başakşehir

- Turkish Cup runner-up: 2022–23

== See also ==
- List of footballers with 100 or more caps
