= Hakan Ünsal =

Turkish footballer (born 1973)

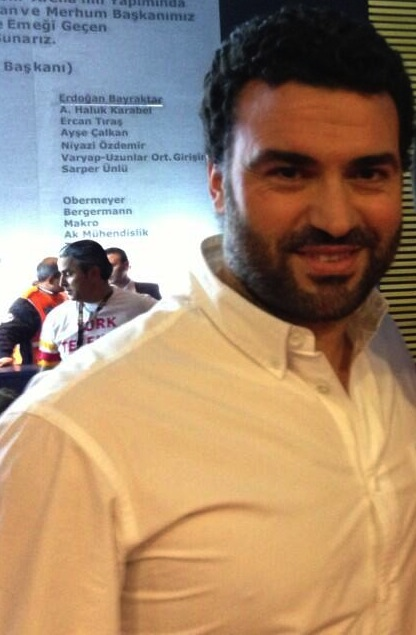
- Ünsal in 2013

Personal information
- Full name: Hakan Ünsal
- Date of birth: 14 May 1973 (age 53)
- Place of birth: Sinop, Turkey
- Height: 1.78 m (5 ft 10 in)
- Position: Left wing back

Senior career*
Years	Team	Apps	(Gls)
1993–1994	Karabükspor	26	(2)
1994–2002	Galatasaray	166	(11)
2002	Blackburn Rovers	8	(0)
2002–2005	Galatasaray	53	(1)
2005–2006	Çaykur Rizespor	4	(0)
Total		257	(14)

International career
1994–1995	Turkey U-21	12	(1)
1996–2004	Turkey	33	(1)
Medal record
Representing Turkey
Men's football
FIFA World Cup
Third place	2002 Korea/Japan
- * Club domestic league appearances and goals

Hakan Ünsal (born 14 May 1973) is a Turkish former professional footballer who played as a left wing-back. He began his professional career at Karabükspor and spent much of his playing career at Galatasaray, where he won several major honours. In 2002, he also played for English club Blackburn Rovers before returning to Galatasaray to continue his career.

Ünsal made his debut for the Turkey national team in 1996 and represented his country until 2004. He participated in UEFA Euro 2000 and the 2002 FIFA World Cup, helping Turkey finish third in the latter tournament.

== Club career ==
Ünsal began his professional career with Karabükspor in 1993. After playing for the club during the 1993–94 season, he moved to Galatasaray in August 1994. Deployed as a left-sided defender, Ünsal established himself in the team thanks to his pace and attacking contributions, subsequently becoming a regular starter for several seasons. During his time at Galatasaray, he won the Süper Lig title on multiple occasions and contributed to the club's achievements in domestic cup competitions.

Ünsal also achieved success in European competitions with Galatasaray during the 1999–2000 season. After being eliminated in the group stage of the UEFA Champions League, Galatasaray continued their European campaign in the UEFA Cup. They reached the final after defeating Bologna, Borussia Dortmund, Mallorca, and Leeds United. Ünsal appeared as a substitute in the final against Arsenal. After the match finished 0–0 following extra time, Galatasaray won 4–1 on penalties, becoming the first Turkish club to win a major European club competition. In August 2000, he also started in the UEFA Super Cup match against Real Madrid. Galatasaray won 2–1 after extra time to claim the trophy.

In December 2001, Ünsal requested a transfer from Galatasaray, attracting interest from English club Blackburn Rovers. Blackburn attempted to sign him in February 2002, but the transfer process was delayed due to work permit issues relating to his appearances for the Turkey national team. Ünsal eventually joined Blackburn in February 2002 to play in the Premier League. However, he failed to secure a regular starting position and made only eight official appearances for the club. Blackburn were managed at the time by Graeme Souness, who had previously coached Ünsal during his time at Galatasaray.

In August 2002, Ünsal left Blackburn and returned to Galatasaray, signing a three-year contract. Following his return, he continued to play as a left-sided defender, supporting the team's defensive line. During the 2002–03 season, he made league appearances for Galatasaray and remained with the club for the following two seasons. He left Galatasaray at the end of the 2004–05 season, during which the club won the Turkish Cup in the 2004–05 campaign.

In August 2005, Ünsal joined Çaykur Rizespor. He continued his playing career with the club during the 2005–06 season, although his opportunities to play were limited. He subsequently retired from professional football. Having made his professional debut at Karabükspor, Ünsal spent the longest period of his career at Galatasaray and also represented Blackburn Rovers and Çaykur Rizespor.

== International career ==
Ünsal was first called up to the Turkey national team in 1996 and made his international debut on 31 August of the same year in a match against the Moldova. He subsequently established himself in the national side as a regular left-sided defender. He also participated in the 1998 FIFA World Cup qualifiers and the UEFA Euro 2000 qualifiers, and was included in Turkey's final squad for UEFA Euro 2000, for which the country qualified.

Ünsal made two appearances at UEFA Euro 2000, which was co-hosted by Belgium and the Netherlands. Turkey lost to the Italy and drew with the Sweden in the group stage, but defeated the Belgium to advance to the quarter-finals. However, they were eliminated after losing 2–0 to the Portugal. Ünsal featured in Turkey's defence during the tournament, gaining further experience at international level.

In 2002, he participated in the 2002 FIFA World Cup, co-hosted by South Korea and Japan. Ünsal started in Turkey's opening group-stage match against the Brazil, but was sent off after kicking the ball at Brazil's Rivaldo during a corner-kick situation in the second half. Although Rivaldo was struck on the leg by the ball, he covered his face and fell to the ground, prompting the referee to show Ünsal a red card. The incident became one of the controversial moments of the tournament. Suspended for the following match, Ünsal returned for Turkey's final group-stage fixture against the China. Turkey advanced from the group stage and subsequently defeated the Japan in the round of 16 and the Senegal in the quarter-finals to reach the semi-finals. Although they lost to Brazil in the semi-finals, Turkey defeated the South Korea 3–2 in the third-place play-off to finish third in the tournament.

Ünsal made his final appearance for the national team on 18 August 2004, in a friendly match against the Belarus, bringing his international career to an end.

== Career statistics ==
Appearances and goals by club, season and competition
Club	Season	League		Cup		Europe		Total	
Club	Season	Apps	Goals	Apps	Goals	Apps	Goals	Apps	Goals
Karabükspor	1993–94	26	2					26	2
Galatasaray	1995–96	28	1					28	1
Galatasaray	1996–97	29	2					29	2
Galatasaray	1997-98	27	3					27	3
Galatasaray	1998–99	31	3					31	3
Galatasaray	1999–2000	16	1			8	1	16	1
Galatasaray	2000–01	15	1			14	2	29	3
Galatasaray	2001–02	8	0					8	0
Galatasaray	Total	154	11	0	0	22	3	176	14
Blackburn Rovers	2001–02	8	0	0	0	0	0	8	0
Galatasaray	2002–03	24	1					24	1
Galatasaray	2003–04	14	0					14	0
Galatasaray	2004–05	15	0					15	0
Galatasaray	Total	53	1	0	0	0	0	53	1
Çaykur Rizespor	2005–06	4	0					4	0
Career total		245	14			22	3	267	17

== Honours ==
Galatasaray

- Süper Lig: 1996–97, 1997–98, 1998–99, 1999–2000, 2001–02
- Turkish Cup: 1995–96, 1998–99, 1999–2000, 2004–05
- UEFA Cup: 1999–2000
- UEFA Super Cup: 2000

Turkey

- FIFA World Cup third place: 2002

Order

- Turkish State Medal of Distinguished Service
