= Arif Erdem =

Turkish footballer (born 1972)

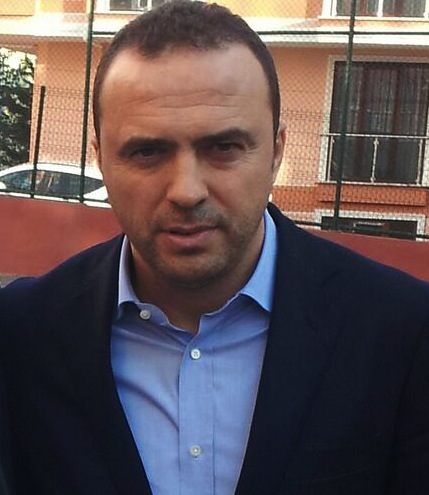
- Erdem in 2013

Personal information
- Date of birth: 2 January 1972 (age 54)
- Place of birth: Istanbul, Turkey
- Height: 1.78 m (5 ft 10 in)
- Position: Forward

Youth career
- 1986–19??: Yeşilılgazspor
- 19??–1991: Zeytinburnuspor

Senior career*
Years	Team	Apps	(Gls)
1991–2000	Galatasaray	244	(64)
2000	Real Sociedad	2	(1)
2000–2005	Galatasaray	103	(41)
Total		349	(106)

International career
1991–1993	Turkey U21	10	(1)
1993	Turkey Olympic	5	(1)
1994–2003	Turkey	60	(11)

Managerial career
- 2006–2011: İstanbul B.B. (Assistant)
- 2011–2012: İstanbul B.B.
Medal record
Third place	FIFA World Cup	2002
- * Club domestic league appearances and goals

Arif Erdem (born 2 January 1972) is a Turkish retired football manager and former professional player who played in the forward position. Starting out with local club Zeytinburnuspor in 1990, Erdem had a decorated 15-year professional career. He scored 106 goals in 341 league matches and finished joint top scorer (Gol Kralı) of the Süper Lig with İlhan Mansız at the conclusion of the 2001–02 season.

During his 14 years with Galatasaray, Erdem won seven Süper Lig titles and five Turkish Cup titles, as well as the UEFA Cup in 2000. He was a part of the Turkey national team that finished third at the 2002 FIFA World Cup. Erdem was capped 60 times, scoring eleven goals.

He managed İstanbul Büyükşehir Belediyespor from 2011 to 2012.

== Club career ==
Erdem played for Zeytinburnuspor before signing his first professional contract with Galatasaray on 1 June 1991. He made 29 total appearances in his first season with the club, scoring four goals. Erdem made fewer appearances the following season, providing four goals in 18 appearances as the club achieved a domestic treble (Süper Lig, Turkish Cup, and Turkish Super Cup). The next season, 1993–94, was Erdem's most successful to date. His nine goals in the league helped Galatasaray earn another league title. Erdem finished his first stint with Galatasaray after winning the 1999–2000 UEFA Cup, totaling six league titles, four cup titles, and four other cup titles.

Erdem left Galatasaray for Real Sociedad at the start of the 2000–01. However, he regretted joining the club, saying "the only thing I wanted was to move to a European team... I didn't even think about it, I signed the first offer I received." Erdem was plagued by injuries during his tenure, and he left the Spanish club after six months, scoring one goal in two appearances. He returned with Galatasaray on 14 November 2000. The following season, Erdem won the Gol Kralı award, an award given to the top scorer of the Süper Lig, en route to his seventh league title with the club. Erdem closed out his professional career with a Turkish Cup win in 2004–05.

== International career ==
Erdem began his international career with the Turkey U21 national team in 1991, scoring one goal in 10 caps. He participated in the Akdeniz Cup with the Turkish Olympic team in 1993, and earned his first senior team cap in 1994. Two years later, Turkey qualified for Euro 1996. He was called up, but Turkey didn't achieve any points.

An exceptional moment of his international career came during the UEFA Euro 2000 qualification, he netted three times within three minutes against Northern Ireland. Turkey qualified and Erdem was included in squad. He was a significant part of the team, especially in a winning clash against co-host Belgium. During the match, he was fouled many times and caused a red card for Filip De Wilde. Turkey qualified to the next round, but lost to Portugal. Erdem missed a penalty in the 46th minute. He took a part at 2002 FIFA World Cup as well, but he didn't play much. His senior international career lasted from 1994 to 2003, where he scored 11 goals in 60 appearances.

== Coaching career ==
Erdem had been an assistant coach with İstanbul Büyükşehir Belediyespor since 2006. On 18 November 2011, after the assignation of Abdullah Avcı to Turkey national football team, he became the new head coach of İstanbul Büyükşehir Belediyespor. At the end of the season, his contract was terminated by club at 14 May 2012.

== Personal life ==
Erdem is of Albanian descent, through his parents who left Kumanovo. He reportedly fled to Greece in 2016 after the failed Turkish coup of 2016, due to his supposed links to the Gülen movement, categorized by the Turkish government as a terrorist organization.

== Career statistics ==
=== Club ===
Appearances and goals by club, season and competition
Club	Season	League		Cup		Europe		Total	
Club	Season	Apps	Goals	Apps	Goals	Apps	Goals	Apps	Goals
Galatasaray	1991–92	27	4	2	0	6	1	35	5
Galatasaray	1992–93	15	3	3	1	1	1	19	5
Galatasaray	1993–94	26	9	6	2	9	2	41	13
Galatasaray	1994–95	32	2	8	1	8	3	48	6
Galatasaray	1995–96	32	8	7	2	–		39	10
Galatasaray	1996–97	31	8	2	0	4	1	37	9
Galatasaray	1997–98	33	9	8	3	8	1	49	13
Galatasaray	1998–99	27	14	6	4	6	1	39	19
Galatasaray	1999-00	21	7	3	0	15	1	39	8
Galatasaray	Total	244	64	45	13	57	11	346	88
Real Sociedad	2000–01	2	1	–		–		2	1
Galatasaray	2000–01	20	5	3	2	4	0	27	7
Galatasaray	2001–02	32	21	0	0	13	2	45	23
Galatasaray	2002–03	25	11	2	0	5	1	32	12
Galatasaray	2003–04	15	3	0	0	6	2	21	5
Galatasaray	2004–05	11	1	2	0	–		13	1
Galatasaray	Total	103	41	7	2	28	5	138	48
Career total		349	106	52	15	85	16	484	136

=== International ===
Scores and results list Turkey's goal tally first, score column indicates score after each Erdem goal.

List of international goals scored by Arif Erdem
No.	Date	Venue	Opponent	Score	Result	Competition
1	31 August 1994	Philip II Arena, Skopje, Republic of Macedonia	North Macedonia		2–0	Friendly
2	10 September 1997	Stadio Olimpico, Serravalle, San Marino	San Marino		5–0	1998 World Cup qualification
3	10 September 1997	Stadio Olimpico, Serravalle, San Marino	San Marino		5–0	1998 World Cup qualification
4	4 September 1999	Windsor Park, Belfast, Northern Ireland	Northern Ireland		3–0	Euro 2000 qualifying
5	4 September 1999	Windsor Park, Belfast, Northern Ireland	Northern Ireland		3–0	Euro 2000 qualifying
6	4 September 1999	Windsor Park, Belfast, Northern Ireland	Northern Ireland		3–0	Euro 2000 qualifying
7	14 November 2001	Ali Sami Yen Stadium, Istanbul, Turkey	Austria		5–0	2002 World Cup qualification
8	14 November 2001	Ali Sami Yen Stadium, Istanbul, Turkey	Austria		5–0	2002 World Cup qualification
9	21 August 2002	Hüseyin Avni Aker Stadium, Trabzon, Turkey	Georgia		3–0	Friendly
10	7 September 2002	Ali Sami Yen Stadium, Istanbul, Turkey	Slovakia		3–0	Euro 2004 qualifying
11	7 September 2002	Ali Sami Yen Stadium, Istanbul, Turkey	Slovakia		3–0	Euro 2004 qualifying

== Managerial statistics ==
Team	From	To	Record							
Team	From	To	G	W	D	L	Win %	GF	GA	+/-
İstanbul BB	20 November 2011	14 May 2012	32	12	6	14	37.5	45	55	-10
Total			32	12	6	14	37.5	45	55	-10

== Honours ==
Galatasaray

- Süper Lig: 1992–93, 1993–94, 1996–97, 1997–98, 1998–99, 1999–2000, 2001–02
- Turkish Cup: 1992–93, 1995–96, 1998–99, 1999–2000, 2004–05
- Turkish Super Cup: 1992–93, 1995–96, 1996–97
- UEFA Cup: 1999–2000

Turkey

- FIFA World Cup third place: 2002
