= Hasan Şaş =

Turkish footballer and coach (born 1976)

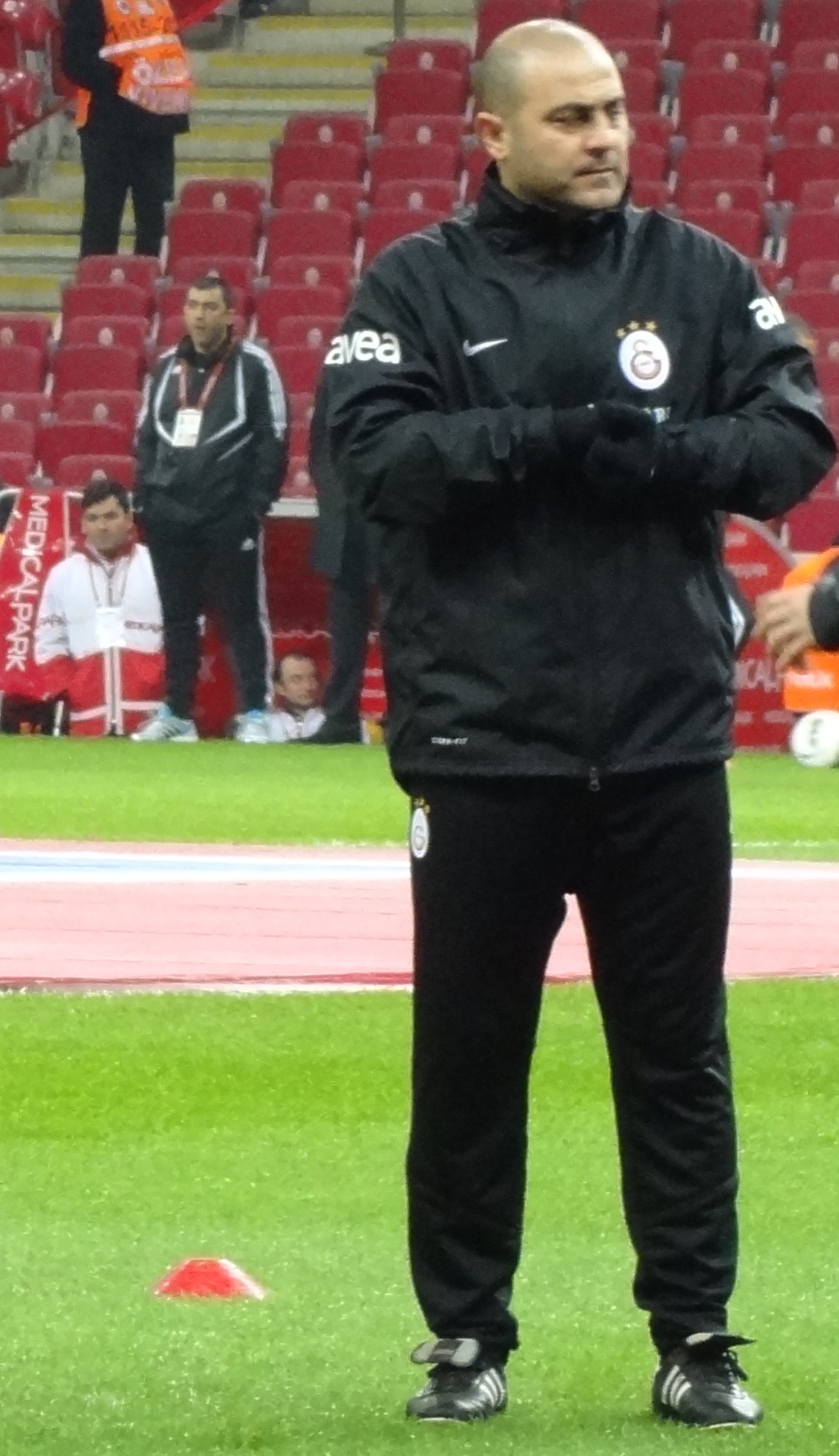
- Hasan with Galatasaray in 2012

Personal information
- Full name: Hasan Gökhan Şaş
- Date of birth: 1 August 1976 (age 50)
- Place of birth: Karataş, Turkey
- Height: 1.77 m (5 ft 10 in)
- Position: Winger

Senior career*
| Years | Team | Apps | (Gls) |
| 1993–1995 | Adana Demirspor | 4 | (0) |
| 1995–1998 | Ankaragücü | 80 | (9) |
| 1998–2009 | Galatasaray | 234 | (28) |
| Total | | 318 | (37) |

International career
| 1998–2006 | Turkey | 40 | (2) |

Managerial career
- 2011–2013: Galatasaray (assistant manager)
- 2018–2020: Galatasaray (assistant manager)
Medal record
| Third place | FIFA World Cup | 2002 |
- * Club domestic league appearances and goals

Hasan Gökhan Şaş (Turkish pronunciation: [hasan ʃaʃ]; born 1 August 1976) is a Turkish football coach and former player, who played as a winger.

He is known for his time at Galatasaray and for his performance with the Turkey national team at the FIFA World Cup 2002, where he was voted into the All-Star Team. During both assignments, he played as a winger. He was suspended from football for six months in 1998 after doping testing returned a positive result for the banned substance Phenylpropanolamine.

== Club career ==
Born in Karataş, Adana, Şaş began his club career with Ankaragücü in 1995.

=== Galatasaray ===
In 1998, Şaş signed with Galatasaray for $4.4 million, but almost immediately upon arrival, he was suspended from football for six months after doping testing returned a positive result for the banned substance Phenylpropanolamine.

Şaş regained his spot with Galatasaray in the 1999–2000 season, in which Galatasaray won the UEFA Cup title in 2000 over Arsenal, and went on to win the 2000 UEFA Super Cup.

In the Champions League competition in 2000–01, Şaş made 12 appearances for Galatasaray. He scored against Spain's Real Madrid and Italy's A.C. Milan as well as against the Brazil national team in 2002 FIFA World Cup.

At the end of the 2008–09 Super Lig season it was announced that Galatasaray would not be renewing his contract and after declining many contracts to play in Qatar and Saudi Arabia, Şaş announced his retirement from professional football.

== International career ==
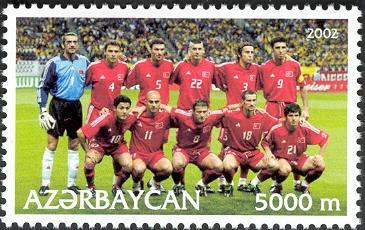
(#11 Hasan) Turkey national football team on an Azerbaijanian stamp for the 2002 FIFA World Cup

Hasan made 40 appearances for the Turkey national team from 1998 to 2006.

== Coaching career ==
Şaş resigned from duty of assistant manager of Galatasaray on 11 May 2020.

== Personal life ==
Şaş married Sibel Yalçın on 29 June 2003. They divorced in February 2014. The couple have two children.

== Career statistics ==
=== Club ===
Appearances and goals by club, season and competition
| Club | Season | League | | | Cup (Note: Appearances in Turkish Cup) | | Other Cup (Note: Appearances in Turkish Super Cup, Atatürk Cup, Chancellor Cup, and TSYD Cup) | | Continental (Note: Appearances in UEFA Champions League, UEFA Cup and UEFA Super Cup) | | Total | |
| Club | Season | Division | Apps | Goals | Apps | Goals | Apps | Goals | Apps | Goals | Apps | Goals |
|---|---|---|---|---|---|---|---|---|---|---|---|---|
| Adana Demirspor | 1994–95 | 1. Lig (Note: Named respectively as Milli Lig between 1959–1962, Türkiye 1. Futbol Ligi (1. Lig) between 1962–2000, and Süper Lig from 2001 to present) | 3 | 0 | — | | — | | — | | 3 | 0 |
| Ankaragücü | 1995–96 | 1. Lig | 19 | 1 | — | | — | | — | | 19 | 1 |
| Ankaragücü | 1996–97 | 1. Lig | 29 | 6 | — | | — | | — | | 29 | 6 |
| Ankaragücü | 1997–98 | 1. Lig | 32 | 2 | — | | — | | — | | 32 | 2 |
| Ankaragücü | Total | | 80 | 9 | 0 | 0 | 0 | 0 | 0 | 0 | 80 | 9 |
| Galatasaray | 1998–99 | 1. Lig | 24 | 4 | — | | — | | 6 | 0 | 30 | 4 |
| Galatasaray | 1999–00 | 1. Lig | 25 | 3 | — | | — | | 4 | 0 | 29 | 3 |
| Galatasaray | 2000–01 | 1. Lig | 30 | 6 | — | | — | | 12 | 2 | 42 | 8 |
| Galatasaray | 2001–02 | Süper Lig | 27 | 2 | — | | — | | 11 | 0 | 38 | 2 |
| Galatasaray | 2002–03 | Süper Lig | 20 | 1 | 1 | 0 | — | | 5 | 1 | 26 | 2 |
| Galatasaray | 2003–04 | Süper Lig | 22 | 2 | 1 | 0 | — | | 7 | 1 | 30 | 3 |
| Galatasaray | 2004–05 | Süper Lig | 22 | 4 | — | | — | | — | | 22 | 4 |
| Galatasaray | 2005–06 | Süper Lig | 26 | 2 | 4 | 0 | — | | 2 | 0 | 32 | 2 |
| Galatasaray | 2006–07 | Süper Lig | 20 | 2 | 3 | 0 | — | | 4 | 1 | 27 | 3 |
| Galatasaray | 2007–08 | Süper Lig | 10 | 1 | 4 | 0 | 1 | 0 | 4 | 0 | 19 | 1 |
| Galatasaray | 2008–09 | Süper Lig | 8 | 0 | 0 | 0 | — | | 4 | 0 | 12 | 0 |
| Galatasaray | Total | | 234 | 27 | 13 | 0 | 1 | 0 | 59 | 5 | 307 | 32 |
| Career total | | | 317 | 36 | 13 | 0 | 1 | 0 | 59 | 5 | 390 | 41 |

=== International ===
Appearances and goals by national team and year
| National team | Year | Apps | Goals |
|---|---|---|---|
| Turkey | 1998 | 2 | 0 |
| Turkey | 1999 | 0 | 0 |
| Turkey | 2000 | 2 | 0 |
| Turkey | 2001 | 9 | 0 |
| Turkey | 2002 | 10 | 2 |
| Turkey | 2003 | 6 | 0 |
| Turkey | 2004 | 7 | 0 |
| Turkey | 2005 | 3 | 0 |
| Turkey | 2006 | 1 | 0 |
| Total | | 40 | 2 |

Scores and results list Turkey's goal tally first, score column indicates score after each Şaş goal.

List of international goals scored by Hasan Şaş
| No. | Date | Venue | Opponent | Score | Result | Competition |
|---|---|---|---|---|---|---|
| 1 | 3 June 2002 | Munsu Cup Stadium, Ulsan, South Korea | Brazil | 1–0 | 1–2 | 2002 FIFA World Cup |
| 2 | 13 June 2002 | Seoul World Cup Stadium, Seoul, South Korea | China | 1–0 | 3–0 | 2002 FIFA World Cup |

== Honours ==
Turkey

- FIFA World Cup third place: 2002

Galatasaray

- Turkish League: 1998–99, 1999–2000, 2001–02, 2005–06, 2007–08
- Turkish Cup: 1998–99, 1999–2000, 2004–05
- Turkish Super Cup: 2008
- UEFA Cup: 2000
- UEFA Super Cup: 2000

Individual

- FIFA World Cup All Star Team: 2002

Order

- Turkish State Medal of Distinguished Service
