= Suat Kaya =

Turkish footballer and manager

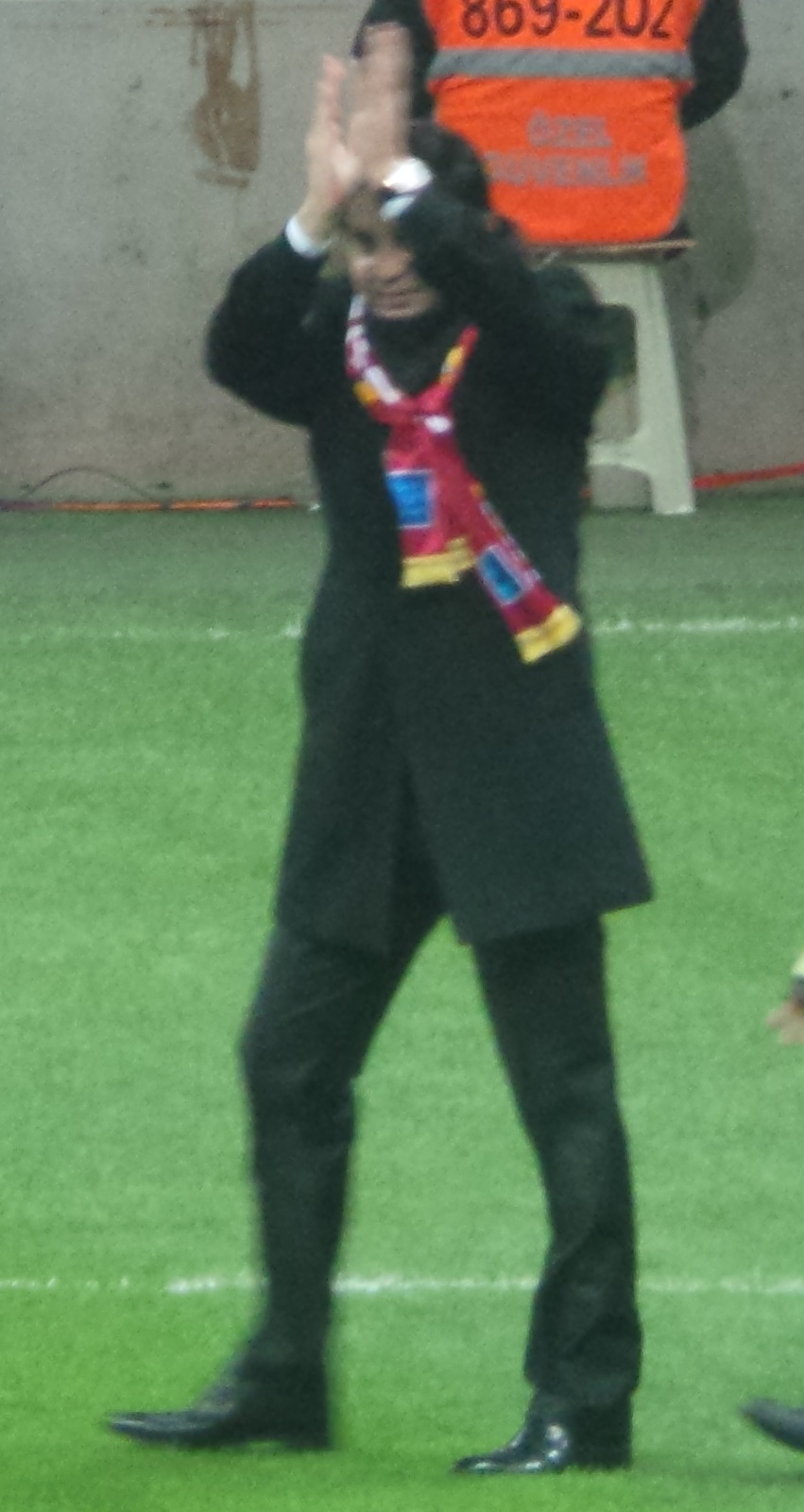

Personal information
- Date of birth: 26 August 1967 (age 59)
- Place of birth: Istanbul, Turkey
- Height: 1.68 m (5 ft 6 in)
- Position: Midfielder

Youth career
- 1979–1986: Galatasaray

Senior career*
Years	Team	Apps	(Gls)
1986–1987	Galatasaray	3	(0)
1987–1992	Konyaspor	110	(13)
1992–2003	Galatasaray	241	(31)
Total		354	(44)

International career
1993–2002	Turkey	18	(2)

Managerial career
- 2004–2006: Galatasaray B
- 2006–2007: Gaziantep Belediyespor (assistant)
- 2007: Orduspor (assistant)
- 2007–2008: Gaziantep Belediyespor (assistant)
- 2009: Çaykur Rizespor
- 2010: Diyarbakırspor
- 2011: Tokatspor
- 2013: Gaziantep Belediyespor
- 2014: Göztepe
- 2015–2016: Bucaspor
- 2016–2019: Menemen Belediyespor
- 2019: Sakaryaspor
- 2021: Serik Belediyespor
- 2021: Tuzlaspor
- 2021–2022: Eskişehirspor
- 2022: Tuzlaspor
- 2024: Sakaryaspor
- 2026: Boluspor
Medal record
Representing Turkey
Men's football
FIFA World Cup
Third place	2002 Japan-South Korea
- * Club domestic league appearances and goals

Suat Kaya (born 26 August 1967) is a Turkish football manager and former player.

His career was all but associated with Galatasaray, with which he won major titles including and the 2000 UEFA Cup. Over the course of 16 seasons, he amassed Süper Lig totals of 353 games and 44 goals.

== Club career ==
Born in Istanbul, Suat started playing professionally with Turkish first division powerhouse Galatasaray, making his first-team debuts at age 19. In the following five years, he represented Konyaspor.

Returned in 1992, Suat only played eight times in his first season in his second spell, as Gala won the league. He proceeded to become an essential midfield figure in the following years, notably scoring a career-best eight goals in two consecutive seasons – 1993 to 1995 – helping the Istanbul side to five leagues and two cups (this included two consecutive doubles).

Aged nearly 33, in 2000, Suat appeared, as a starter, in both of Galatasaray's European conquests, the UEFA Cup and the UEFA Super Cup. In June 2003, he retired from football, starting a coaching career in the following year, with Galatasaray's reserves. In the next seasons, he managed several clubs, namely second division's Gaziantep Büyükşehir Belediyespor (two spells).

== International career ==
Suat gained 15 caps for Turkey during seven years, and participated at UEFA Euro 2000. In the final stages in Belgium and the Netherlands, he played in three out of four matches for the national side, assisting Hakan Şükür in the second goal of the 2–0 group stage win against co-hosts Belgium, on 19 June.

== Career statistics ==
=== Club ===
Appearances and goals by club, season and competition
Club	Season	League		National cup		League cup (Note: Includes Atatürk Cup, Chancellor Cup, President Cup and TSYD Cup.)		Europe		Total	
Club	Season	Apps	Goals	Apps	Goals	Apps	Goals	Apps	Goals	Apps	Goals
Galatasaray	1986–87	3	0							3	0
Konyaspor	1987–88	1	0							1	0
Konyaspor	1988–89	29	2	8	0					37	2
Konyaspor	1989–90	24	1	1	0					25	1
Konyaspor	1990–91	28	3	1	0					29	3
Konyaspor	1991–92	28	7	1	0					29	7
Konyaspor	Total	110	13	11	0	0	0	0	0	121	13
Galatasaray	1992–93	8	0	3	0	3	0	1	0	15	0
Galatasaray	1993–94	27	8	5	0	3	1	9	0	44	9
Galatasaray	1994–95	27	8	7	3	2	1	5	0	41	12
Galatasaray	1995–96	28	5	5	0	3	0	2	0	38	5
Galatasaray	1996–97	25	2			3	1			28	3
Galatasaray	1997–98	21	2	5	1	3	2	2	1	31	6
Galatasaray	1998–99	23	2	3	0	2	0	4	1	32	3
Galatasaray	1999–2000	28	1	4	0	2	0	13	0	47	1
Galatasaray	2000–01	25	1	2	0	1	0	12	1	40	2
Galatasaray	2001–02	19	1					12	1	31	2
Galatasaray	2002–03	10	1					3	0	10	1
Galatasaray	Total	241	31	34	4	22	5	63	4	360	44
Career total		354	44	45	4	22	5	63	4	484	57

=== International ===
Appearances and goals by national team and year
National team	Year	Apps	Goals
Turkey	1993	1	0
Turkey	1994	2	0
Turkey	1995	3	1
Turkey	1997	1	0
Turkey	2000	8	0
Total		15	1

== Managerial statistics ==
As of 10 June 2010

Team	From	To	Record				
Team	From	To	G	W	D	L	Win %
Galatasaray B	2004	2006	0	0	0	0	—
Belediyespor	2006	2007	25	9	10	6	36.00
Orduspor	2007	2007	11	3	4	4	27.27
Belediyespor	2007	2008	35	11	12	12	31.43
Rizespor	2009	2009	3	0	0	3	0.00
Total			74	23	26	25	31.08

== Honours ==
Galatasaray

- Süper Lig: 1986–87, 1992–93, 1993–94, 1996–97, 1997–98, 1998–99, 1999–2000, 2001–02
- Turkish Cup: 1992–93, 1995–96, 1998–99, 1999–2000
- UEFA Cup: 1999–2000
- UEFA Super Cup: 2000
