= Erhan Namlı =

Turkish footballer

Erhan Namlı (born 7 May 1974 in Ankara) is a Turkish footballer who plays as a midfielder for Çankırı Belediye Spor in the TFF Second League.

Namlı previously played for Trabzonspor, Galatasaray S.K., Eskişehirspor and Adana Demirspor.
