= Vedat İnceefe =

Turkish footballer

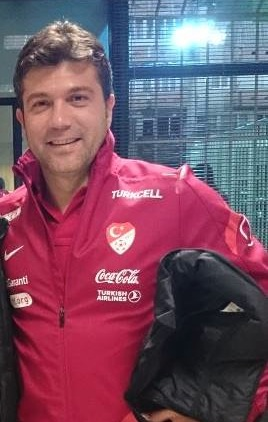
- Vedat İnceefe, 2014

Personal information
- Date of birth: 1 April 1974 (age 52)
- Place of birth: Burhaniye, Turkey
- Height: 1.84 m (6 ft 0 in)
- Position: Centre-back

Team information
- Current team: Turkey U21 (manager)

Youth career
- 1992–1993: Beşiktaş

Senior career*
Years	Team	Apps	(Gls)
1993–1994	Soma Sotesspor	19	(3)
1994–1996	Karabükspor	60	(3)
1996–2003	Galatasaray	89	(3)
2000	→ İstanbulspor (loan)	10	(0)
2003–2006	Manisaspor	22	(0)

International career
1996–1997	Turkey	6	(0)

Managerial career
- 2010–2011: Yeni Malatyaspor
- 2011: Bugsaşspor
- 2013: Galatasaray U19
- 2014–2018: Turkey U19
- 2018–: Turkey U21
- * Club domestic league appearances and goals

Vedat İnceefe (born 1 April 1974 in Bandırma, Balıkesir) is a retired Turkish football player.

He played for Soma Sotesspor (1992–1994), Karabükspor (1994–1996), Galatasaray (1996–2000 and 2000–2003), İstanbulspor (2000), Vestel Manisaspor (2003–2006), Bursaspor (2006) and now Karabükspor.

He played for Turkey national football team and was a participant at the 1996 UEFA European Championship.

== Honours ==
- Galatasaray
  - UEFA Super Cup: 2000
