= 2000 UEFA Super Cup =

- Match programme cover
Real Madrid	Galatasaray
(Spain)	(Turkey)
1	2
- After golden goal extra time
- Date: 25 August 2000
- Venue: Stade Louis II, Monaco
- Man of the Match: Okan Buruk (Galatasaray)
- Referee: Günther Benkö (Austria)
- Attendance: 15,000

The 2000 UEFA Super Cup was a football match played on 25 August 2000 between Real Madrid of Spain and Galatasaray of Turkey. Real Madrid qualified by beating Valencia in the 2000 UEFA Champions League Final, while Galatasaray had made it to the Super Cup after beating Arsenal in the 2000 UEFA Cup Final. Galatasaray won the match 2–1, both goals scored by Mário Jardel, the latter a golden goal.

This was the first Super Cup contested by the winners of the UEFA Cup (now the UEFA Europa League). Until 1999, it was contested by the winners of the UEFA Champions League and the winners of the UEFA Cup Winners' Cup, but the Cup Winners' Cup was discontinued after the 1998–99 season.

== Venue ==
The Stade Louis II in Monaco has been the venue for the UEFA Super Cup since 1998. It was built in 1985, and is also the home of AS Monaco, who play in the French league system.

== Teams ==
Team	Qualification	Previous participation (bold indicates winners)
(Spain) Real Madrid	1999–2000 UEFA Champions League winners	1998
(Turkey) Galatasaray	1999–2000 UEFA Cup winners	None

Steve McManaman was controversially left out of Real Madrid's starting line-up and squad for the match.

== Match ==
=== Details ===
25 August 2000
20:45 CEST

Real Madrid (Spain)	1–2 (a.e.t./g.g.)	(Turkey) Galatasaray
Raúl 79' (pen.)	Report	Jardel 41' (pen.), 102'

Stade Louis II, Monaco
Attendance: 15,000
Referee: Günter Benkö (Austria)

**Real Madrid**	**Galatasaray**

GK	25	(Spain) Iker Casillas
RB	21	(Cameroon) Geremi
CB	12	(Spain) Iván Campo		(substituted off) 66'
CB	15	(Spain) Iván Helguera	(yellow card) 32'
LB	3	(Brazil) Roberto Carlos
RM	10	(Portugal) Luís Figo	(yellow card) 70'
CM	16	(France) Claude Makélélé	(yellow card) 22'
CM	6	(Spain) Albert Celades		(substituted off) 100'
LM	11	(Brazil) Sávio
AM	14	(Spain) Guti		(substituted off) 53'
CF	7	(Spain) Raúl (c)
Substitutes:
GK	13	(Spain) César Sánchez
DF	2	(Spain) Míchel Salgado		(substituted on) 100'
DF	18	(Spain) Aitor Karanka
MF	17	(Brazil) Flávio Conceição		(substituted on) 66'
MF	19	(Argentina) Santiago Solari
FW	22	(Spain) Pedro Munitis	(yellow card) 99'	(substituted on) 53'
FW	24	(Spain) Tote
Manager:
(Spain) Vicente del Bosque

GK	1	(Brazil) Cláudio Taffarel
RB	35	(Brazil) Capone		(substituted off) 86'
CB	4	(Romania) Gheorghe Popescu
CB	3	(Turkey) Bülent Korkmaz (c)
LB	57	(Turkey) Hakan Ünsal
RM	7	(Turkey) Okan Buruk	(yellow card) 7'	(substituted off) 81'
CM	5	(Turkey) Emre Belözoğlu
CM	8	(Turkey) Suat Kaya	(yellow card) 29'
LM	10	(Romania) Gheorghe Hagi		(substituted off) 71'
CF	22	(Turkey) Ümit Davala	(yellow card) 90'
CF	9	(Brazil) Mário Jardel
Substitutes:
GK	16	(Turkey) Kerem İnan
DF	6	(Turkey) Ahmet Yıldırım
DF	14	(Turkey) Fatih Akyel		(substituted on) 86'
DF	26	(Turkey) Emre Aşık
MF	11	(Turkey) Hasan Şaş		(substituted on) 81'
MF	28	(Turkey) Bülent Akın		(substituted on) 71'
FW	20	(Turkey) Serkan Aykut
Manager:
(Romania) Mircea Lucescu

Man of the Match:
Okan Buruk (Galatasaray)

Assistant referees:
Egon Bereuter (Austria)
Markus Mayr (Austria)
Fourth official:
Fritz Stuchlik (Austria)

**Match rules**

- 90 minutes
- 30 minutes of golden goal extra time if necessary
- Penalty shoot-out if scores still level
- Seven named substitutes, of which up to three may be used

== See also ==
- 2000–01 UEFA Champions League
- 2000–01 UEFA Cup
- 2000–01 Galatasaray S.K. season
- 2000–01 Real Madrid CF season
- Galatasaray S.K. in international football
- Real Madrid CF in international football competitions
