= Atatürk Cup =

Football competition in Turkey

The Atatürk Cup was a football competition in Turkey. The first edition was played between the winners of the Prime Minister's Cup and the Presidential Cup in 1998 to memorialize the 60th anniversary of Atatürk's death. Fenerbahçe defeated Beşiktaş 2–0. The second and last edition of the tournament was played as a de facto Super Cup in 2000. As Galatasaray won the double that season, the runners-up of the Süper Lig (Beşiktaş) became their opponent. Beşiktaş defeated Galatasaray 2–1.

== Champions ==
Year	Winners	Score	Runners-up
1998	Fenerbahçe	2–0	Beşiktaş
2000	Beşiktaş	2–1	Galatasaray

== Performance ==
Club	Titles
Fenerbahçe	1
Beşiktaş	1

== See also ==
- Prime Minister's Cup
- Turkish Super Cup
