= Kerem İnan =

Turkish footballer

Personal information
- Full name: Kerem İnan
- Date of birth: 25 March 1980 (age 46)
- Place of birth: Istanbul, Turkey
- Height: 1.89 m (6 ft 2 in)
- Position: Goalkeeper

Youth career
- 1993–1997: Galatasaray

Senior career*
Years	Team	Apps	(Gls)
1997–1999	Galatasaray B	49	(0)
1998–2003	Galatasaray	16	(0)
2003–2004	Çaykur Rizespor	7	(0)
2004–2007	Samsunspor	41	(0)
2007–2008	Etimesgut Şekerspor	44	(0)
2008–2009	Karşıyaka	35	(0)
2009–2011	Mersin İdmanyurdu	65	(0)
2012–2013	Şanlıurfaspor	2	(0)
2016–2017	Erokspor	6	(0)
Total		265	(0)

International career
1998	Turkey U17	2	(0)
1997–1998	Turkey U18	13	(0)
2000–2001	Turkey U21	16	(0)
- * Club domestic league appearances and goals as of 28 December 2016 (UTC)

Kerem İnan (born 25 March 1980) is a former Turkish professional football goalkeeper who played for Galatasaray.

== Career statistics ==
As of 20 August 2010

Club	Season	League		Cup		League Cup		Europe		Total	
Club	Season	Apps	Goals	Apps	Goals	Apps	Goals	Apps	Goals	Apps	Goals
Galatasaray	1998–99	0	0	1	0	0	0	0	0	1	0
Galatasaray	1999–00	1	0	1	0	0	0	0	0	2	0
Galatasaray	2000–01	8	0	1	0	0	0	0	0	9	0
Galatasaray	2001–02	6	0	1	0	0	0	0	0	7	0
Galatasaray	2002–03	1	0	2	0	0	0	0	0	3	0
Galatasaray	Total	16	0	6	0	0	0	0	0	22	0
Çaykur Rizespor	2003–04	7	0	1	0	-		-		8	0
Çaykur Rizespor	Total	7	0	1	0	0	0	0	0	8	0
Samsunspor	2004–05	15	0	2	0	-		-		17	0
Samsunspor	2005–06	21	0	3	0	-		-		24	0
Samsunspor	2006–07	5	0	0	0	-		-		5	0
Samsunspor	Total	41	0	5	0	0	0	0	0	46	0
Etimesgut Şekerspor	2006–07	11	0	0	0	-		-		11	0
Etimesgut Şekerspor	2007–08	33	0	0	0	-		-		33	0
Etimesgut Şekerspor	Total	44	0	0	0	0	0	0	0	44	0
Karşıyaka	2008–09	35	0	1	0	-		-		36	0
Karşıyaka	Total	35	0	1	0	0	0	0	0	36	0
Mersin İdmanyurdu	2009–10	33	0	0	0	-		-		33	0
Mersin İdmanyurdu	2010–11	1	0	0	0	0	0	-		0	0
Mersin İdmanyurdu	Total	34	0	0	0	0	0	0	0	34	0
Career total		177	0	13	0	0	0	0	0	190	0

== Honours ==
- Galatasaray
  - Turkish League: 2 (1999–00, 2001–02)
  - Turkish Cup: 2 (1998–99, 1999–00)
  - UEFA Cup: 1 (1999–00)
  - UEFA Super Cup: 1 (2000)
