= 1995–96 1.Lig =

38th season of top-tier Turkish football

1.Lig
- Season: 1995–96
- Champions: Fenerbahçe; 13th title
- Relegated: Kayserispor; Eskişehirspor; Karşıyaka
- Champions League: Fenerbahçe
- Cup Winners' Cup: Galatasaray
- UEFA Cup: Trabzonspor; Beşiktaş
- Intertoto Cup: Kocaelispor; Gaziantepspor; Antalyaspor
- Matches played: 306
- Goals scored: 873 (2.85 per match)
- Top goalscorer: Shota Arveladze (25 goals)

The 1995-96 Turkish First Football League season saw 18 teams in competition. Fenerbahçe S.K. won the championship. The season was notable for Graeme Souness's season-long cameo as the manager of Galatasaray.

== League table ==
Pos	Team	Pld	W	D	L	GF	GA	GD	Pts	Qualification or relegation
1	Fenerbahçe (C)	34	26	6	2	68	19	+49	84	Qualification to Champions League qualifying round
2	Trabzonspor	34	26	4	4	79	24	+55	82	Qualification to UEFA Cup qualifying round
3	Beşiktaş	34	22	3	9	74	46	+28	69	Qualification to UEFA Cup qualifying round
4	Galatasaray	34	21	5	8	67	38	+29	68	Qualification to Cup Winners' Cup first round
5	Kocaelispor	34	16	11	7	61	43	+18	59	Qualification to Intertoto Cup group stage
6	Gaziantepspor	34	14	7	13	42	43	−1	49	Qualification to Intertoto Cup group stage
7	Antalyaspor	34	13	6	15	45	55	−10	45	Qualification to Intertoto Cup group stage
8	Samsunspor	34	12	7	15	46	46	0	43	
9	Bursaspor	34	10	11	13	56	48	+8	41	
10	Gençlerbirliği	34	10	11	13	41	48	−7	41	
11	MKE Ankaragücü	34	10	7	17	36	56	−20	37	
12	Altay	34	9	9	16	35	56	−21	36	
13	İstanbulspor	34	8	11	15	46	57	−11	35	
14	Vanspor	34	8	11	15	32	50	−18	35	
15	Denizlispor	34	8	10	16	38	50	−12	34	
16	Kayserispor (R)	34	7	11	16	41	61	−20	32	Relegation to Turkish Second Football League
17	Eskişehirspor (R)	34	10	2	22	40	68	−28	32	Relegation to Turkish Second Football League
18	Karşıyaka (R)	34	7	6	21	26	65	−39	27	Relegation to Turkish Second Football League

Rules for classification: 1) points; 2) goal difference; 3) number of goals scored.
(C) Champions; (R) Relegated

== Results ==
Home \ Away	ALT	AGÜ	ANT	BJK	BUR	DEN	ESK	FNB	GAL	GAZ	GEN	İST	KSK	KAY	KOC	SAM	TRA	VAN
Altay		1–0	1–2	3–0	1–3	1–2	1–0	0–1	2–5	2–1	1–3	0–0	0–0	2–0	3–2	0–0	2–5	1–1
Ankaragücü	4–0		2–1	0–1	1–0	1–1	1–2	0–3	2–2	0–0	2–0	3–1	1–0	1–1	4–0	1–0	1–3	0–0
Antalyaspor	2–1	2–1		0–3	4–2	1–0	1–0	0–1	0–2	0–1	1–0	0–0	4–0	3–3	1–1	2–1	0–2	4–1
Beşiktaş	3–0	2–1	3–0		4–1	0–4	2–0	1–2	1–2	5–3	2–2	5–2	4–0	4–1	3–5	4–2	2–0	3–1
Bursaspor	0–1	8–0	2–1	1–2		2–2	2–2	0–0	2–0	3–0	1–1	2–1	3–1	1–2	2–2	2–4	1–2	5–0
Denizlispor	1–0	2–3	3–1	0–3	0–0		1–2	0–2	1–3	0–1	3–0	1–2	1–0	2–2	0–0	1–2	0–3	0–0
Eskişehirspor	1–2	2–1	0–2	2–3	1–3	1–1		1–2	1–2	2–0	2–0	1–2	0–2	4–0	0–3	3–0	0–2	2–1
Fenerbahçe	2–2	2–0	3–1	2–0	1–1	0–0	6–0		3–1	1–0	0–0	2–0	4–0	2–1	4–0	1–0	3–1	3–0
Galatasaray	3–1	5–0	1–2	1–3	3–1	1–0	3–0	2–0		2–0	0–1	4–2	3–0	5–0	0–4	1–0	0–0	2–0
Gaziantepspor	2–1	1–0	2–0	1–1	3–0	3–2	3–0	2–2	1–1		2–0	1–6	3–0	1–0	2–4	3–0	0–0	1–0
Gençlerbirliği	1–2	1–2	6–3	1–2	2–1	1–1	3–2	3–1	1–2	1–0		2–0	2–0	1–1	1–1	0–0	1–3	1–1
İstanbulspor	1–1	0–0	1–0	2–3	1–1	2–3	1–3	1–2	1–1	2–0	1–1		0–4	5–2	1–2	0–2	1–4	1–1
Karşıyaka	1–1	0–0	1–2	0–2	0–3	2–0	3–2	0–1	0–3	2–1	1–1	0–3		1–3	1–2	1–0	1–4	2–1
Kayserispor	1–1	4–1	4–0	1–1	0–0	0–0	0–1	1–3	1–2	1–2	2–2	0–1	1–1		1–0	3–2	1–2	3–1
Kocaelispor	1–1	2–0	2–2	1–0	4–2	4–2	2–1	0–1	1–1	2–2	2–0	0–0	2–0	5–0		3–1	1–3	1–0
Samsunspor	4–0	2–1	2–2	0–1	1–0	1–3	3–1	0–3	3–2	1–0	3–0	4–4	4–1	0–0	0–0		0–1	4–1
Trabzonspor	2–0	3–1	2–0	3–1	0–0	3–0	7–1	1–2	4–1	0–0	3–1	2–1	3–0	3–1	2–0	1–0		0–1
Vanspor	2–0	4–1	1–1	2–0	1–1	3–1	3–0	0–3	0–1	2–0	0–1	0–0	1–1	1–0	2–2	0–0	0–5	

Source: TFF, Mackolik
Legend: Blue = home team win; Yellow = draw; Red = away team win.

== Top scorers ==
Rank	Player	Club	Goals
1	(Georgia (country)) Shota Arveladze	Trabzonspor	25
2	(Bosnia and Herzegovina) Elvir Bolić	Fenerbahçe	22
3	(Turkey) Saffet Sancaklı	Kocaelispor	20
4	(Turkey) Ertuğrul Sağlam	Beşiktaş	18
5	(Turkey) Hakan Şükür	Galatasaray	16
6	(Wales) Dean Saunders	Galatasaray	15
6	(Uganda) Majid Musisi	Bursaspor	15
6	(Turkey) Serkan Aykut	Samsunspor	15
9	(Turkey) Hami Mandıralı	Trabzonspor	13
9	(South Africa) John Moshoeu	Kocaelispor	13
