= Ahmet Yıldırım =

Turkish footballer and manager

Personal information
- Date of birth: 25 February 1974 (age 52)
- Place of birth: Amasya, Turkey
- Height: 1.89 m (6 ft 2 in)
- Position: Defender

Team information
- Current team: Sarıyer (manager)

Senior career*
Years	Team	Apps	(Gls)
1991–1993	İzmirspor	37	(0)
1993–1994	Fenerbahçe	1	(0)
1993–1994	→ Samsunspor (loan)	11	(0)
1994–1998	Ankaragücü	84	(5)
1998–1999	İstanbulspor	25	(1)
1999–2001	Galatasaray	28	(3)
2001–2005	Beşiktaş	99	(3)
2005–2006	Ankaraspor	20	(0)
2006–2007	Etimesgut Şekerspor	27	(3)
2007–2008	Malatyaspor	6	(0)
2008–2009	Adanaspor	20	(0)

International career
2003	Turkey	4	(0)

Managerial career
- 2009–2010: Mersin İdmanyurdu (assistant)
- 2010–2013: Körfez FK
- 2014–2015: Pendikspor
- 2015: Fethiyespor
- 2016–2017: BB Erzurumspor
- 2017: Bucaspor
- 2017–2018: Gümüşhanespor
- 2018: Sakaryaspor
- 2019: Kastamonuspor 1966
- 2019: Şanlıurfaspor
- 2019–2020: Kastamonuspor 1966
- 2020–2021: Sarıyer
- 2021–2022: Çorum
- 2022–2023: Amedspor
- 2023: 24 Erzincanspor
- 2023: Bucaspor 1928
- 2023–2024: 52 Orduspor
- * Club domestic league appearances and goals

Ahmet Yıldırım (born 25 February 1974) is a Turkish football coach and former player who last coached 52 Orduspor.

== Club career ==
Yıldırım was born in Amasya. He played for Fenerbahçe S.K., Samsunspor, Ankaragücü, İstanbulspor A.Ş., Galatasaray, Beşiktaş and Ankaraspor in the Turkish Süper Lig.

== International career ==
Yıldırım appeared in four matches for the senior Turkey national team. His debut was a second-half substitute in a friendly against Ukraine on 12 February 2003. He also appeared in one match at the 2003 FIFA Confederations Cup.

== Honours ==
Galatasaray

- Süper Lig: 1999–2000
- Turkish Cup: 1999–2000
- UEFA Cup: 1999–2000
- UEFA Super Cup: 2000

Beşiktaş

- Süper Lig: 2002–03

Turkey

- FIFA Confederations Cup 2003: Third place
