= Bülent Akın =

Belgian-born Turkish footballer

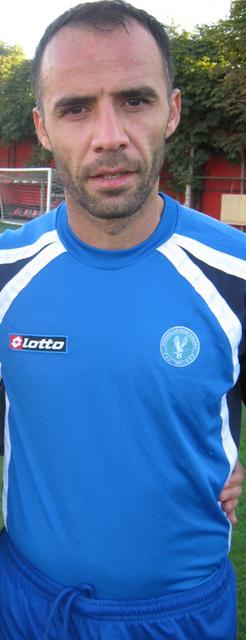

Personal information
- Full name: Bülent Akın
- Date of birth: 28 August 1978 (age 48)
- Place of birth: Brussels, Belgium
- Height: 1.82 m (6 ft 0 in)
- Position: Defensive midfielder

Youth career
- Gençlerbirliği
- Anderlecht

Senior career*
Years	Team	Apps	(Gls)
1999–2000	Denizlispor	30	(1)
2000–2002	Galatasaray	32	(2)
2002–2003	Bolton Wanderers	1	(0)
2003	Akçaabat Sebatspor	0	(0)
2003–2004	Gençlerbirliği	10	(0)
2004–2007	Malatyaspor	56	(3)
2007–2008	Türk Telekomspor	0	(0)
2008	İstanbulspor	9	(0)
2008–2009	MVV	26	(1)
2010–2011	Gölbaşıspor	11	(0)
2011	Yeni Malatyaspor	7	(0)
2011–2012	Gölbaşıspor	1	(0)
Total		164	(7)

International career
1999–2000	Turkey	6	(0)
- * Club domestic league appearances and goals

Bülent Akın (born 28 August 1978) is a Belgian-born Turkish former footballer.

== Club career ==
Akin's potential was noticed after Galatasaray legend Gheorghe Hagi remarked on how well the young midfielder had marked him in a match between Galatasaray and Akin's club, Denizilispor. Galatasaray subsequently signed Akin, but he failed to live up to the expectation. Nonetheless, he managed to win the UEFA Super Cup in 2000 with the club.

In July 2002 he joined English side Bolton Wanderers. He made his debut in a League Cup defeat to Bury, a game in which he was sent off. He made one appearance for Bolton in the league; a 2–0 defeat to Aston Villa on 1 January 2003. He was released by Bolton in April 2003.

== International career ==
Born in Belgium to Turkish parents, Bülent was a youth international for Turkey.

== Honours ==
Galatasaray

- Süper Lig: 2001–02
- UEFA Super Cup: 2000
