= 1996–97 1.Lig =

39th season of top-tier Turkish football

1.Lig
- Season: 1996–97
- Champions: Galatasaray; 11th title
- Relegated: Sarıyer; Denizlispor; Zeytinburnuspor
- Champions League: Galatasaray; Beşiktaş
- Cup Winners' Cup: Kocaelispor
- UEFA Cup: Fenerbahçe; Trabzonspor
- Intertoto Cup: İstanbulspor; Samsunspor; Antalyaspor
- Matches played: 306
- Goals scored: 878 (2.87 per match)
- Top goalscorer: Hakan Şükür (38 goals)

Statistics of Turkish First Football League in the 1996/1997 season.

== Overview ==
It was contested by 18 teams, and Galatasaray S.K. won the championship. Sarıyer G.K., Denizlispor and Zeytinburnuspor relegated to Second League.

== League table ==
Pos	Team	Pld	W	D	L	GF	GA	GD	Pts	Qualification or relegation
1	Galatasaray (C)	34	25	7	2	90	30	+60	82	Qualification to Champions League second qualifying round
2	Beşiktaş	34	22	8	4	88	26	+62	74	Qualification to Champions League second qualifying round
3	Fenerbahçe	34	22	7	5	79	25	+54	73	Qualification to UEFA Cup first round
4	Trabzonspor	34	22	6	6	73	33	+40	72	Qualification to UEFA Cup second qualifying round
5	Bursaspor	34	17	8	9	55	37	+18	59	
6	İstanbulspor	34	16	7	11	56	44	+12	55	Qualification to Intertoto Cup group stage
7	Kocaelispor	34	12	12	10	37	35	+2	48	Qualification to Cup Winners' Cup first round
8	Gaziantepspor	34	13	8	13	38	50	−12	47	
9	Samsunspor	34	12	9	13	49	52	−3	45	Qualification to Intertoto Cup group stage
10	Antalyaspor	34	13	6	15	38	49	−11	45	Qualification to Intertoto Cup group stage
11	Gençlerbirliği	34	11	6	17	37	49	−12	39	
12	MKE Ankaragücü	34	10	8	16	39	52	−13	38	
13	Vanspor	34	10	7	17	31	50	−19	37	
14	Altay	34	9	10	15	30	60	−30	37	
15	Çanakkale Dardanelspor	34	10	6	18	35	65	−30	36	
16	Sarıyer (R)	34	9	7	18	41	54	−13	34	Relegation to Turkish Second Football League
17	Denizlispor (R)	34	5	5	24	36	81	−45	20	Relegation to Turkish Second Football League
18	Zeytinburnuspor (R)	34	2	5	27	26	86	−60	11	Relegation to Turkish Second Football League

Rules for classification: 1) points; 2) goal difference; 3) number of goals scored.
(C) Champions; (R) Relegated

== Results ==
Home \ Away	ALT	ANT	BJK	BUR	ÇDA	DEN	FNB	GAL	GAZ	GEN	İST	KOC	AGÜ	SAM	SAR	TRA	VAN	ZEY
Altay		2–1	0–4	1–1	2–1	2–1	0–0	1–8	2–2	1–0	0–2	0–0	1–1	3–1	4–3	2–3	2–1	0–0
Antalyaspor	1–1		3–2	0–1	1–0	3–0	0–5	0–2	2–1	1–1	2–1	3–2	1–0	1–1	1–1	0–3	1–0	1–0
Beşiktaş	3–0	4–0		2–2	4–0	2–1	1–0	1–1	5–1	2–0	3–0	1–1	4–0	1–0	2–0	3–0	7–0	4–1
Bursaspor	3–0	0–0	2–0		3–1	2–2	0–1	2–3	3–1	2–0	0–2	1–2	2–1	6–1	1–0	3–2	2–0	1–1
Çanakkale Dardanelspor	3–1	3–2	0–5	0–0		3–0	1–1	0–3	1–1	1–3	1–3	3–2	2–1	0–0	1–0	0–2	2–1	4–0
Denizlispor	1–0	1–5	0–4	2–3	0–1		0–1	2–3	3–1	3–3	1–1	0–0	2–6	2–2	0–1	2–3	0–1	3–2
Fenerbahçe	5–1	4–0	0–1	1–0	4–0	7–0		3–2	1–0	2–0	3–0	0–0	1–1	4–1	2–0	1–0	5–0	4–1
Galatasaray	2–1	3–1	2–2	4–1	1–0	2–0	0–4		6–1	1–1	6–1	0–0	5–1	3–1	4–0	1–0	1–1	4–0
Gaziantepspor	2–0	1–0	0–0	2–1	1–1	2–0	2–0	0–3		2–0	1–0	1–1	3–2	0–2	2–1	1–0	0–1	3–1
Gençlerbirliği	1–2	0–1	0–3	0–4	1–1	3–2	4–1	0–2	1–1		1–0	1–0	0–1	3–1	2–1	1–1	1–0	3–2
İstanbulspor	5–0	1–0	4–3	1–1	4–2	5–0	1–1	2–3	3–0	0–3		0–1	1–2	1–1	2–1	2–2	2–1	5–1
Kocaelispor	0–0	0–1	0–0	0–0	2–0	1–0	0–1	1–1	3–1	3–2	1–1		2–1	2–5	1–0	0–2	4–2	2–1
MKE Ankaragücü	1–0	1–3	0–2	0–2	2–1	3–2	0–2	0–1	0–0	1–0	0–0	0–3		0–0	1–0	0–1	2–2	4–1
Samsunspor	0–0	2–1	4–1	2–3	2–0	3–0	1–1	0–2	2–1	1–0	1–0	3–0	2–4		2–2	0–2	0–0	2–0
Sarıyer	0–0	1–1	1–6	1–2	8–0	2–1	1–4	0–4	0–0	2–1	0–1	2–1	2–1	4–1		1–1	2–0	1–0
Trabzonspor	1–0	2–0	3–3	3–0	4–0	3–1	4–3	0–0	5–0	1–0	1–2	2–1	1–1	1–0	3–2		4–0	6–1
Vanspor	3–0	1–0	0–0	1–0	1–0	0–2	2–2	1–2	0–1	3–0	0–1	0–0	2–0	3–2	1–0	1–2		1–1
Zeytinburnuspor	0–1	2–1	0–3	0–1	0–2	1–2	1–5	2–5	0–3	0–1	1–2	0–1	3–2	1–3	1–1	1–5	2–1	

Source: TFF, Mackolik
Legend: Blue = home team win; Yellow = draw; Red = away team win.

== Top scorers ==
Rank	Player	Club	Goals
1	(Turkey) Hakan Şükür	Galatasaray	38
2	(Bosnia and Herzegovina) Elvir Bolić	Fenerbahçe	24
3	(Turkey) Oktay Derelioğlu	Beşiktaş	22
4	(Bosnia and Herzegovina) Elvir Baljić	Bursaspor	21
4	(Turkey) Hami Mandıralı	Trabzonspor	21
6	(Turkey) Ertuğrul Sağlam	Beşiktaş	19
7	(Nigeria) Jay-Jay Okocha	Fenerbahçe	16
7	(Turkey) Serkan Aykut	Samsunspor	16
9	(Romania) Gheorghe Hagi	Galatasaray	14
10	(Turkey) Saffet Akyüz	İstanbulspor	13
10	(Turkey) Saffet Sancaklı	Fenerbahçe	13
