= 1998–99 1.Lig =

41st season of top-tier Turkish football

1.Lig
- Season: 1998–99
- Champions: Galatasaray; 13th title
- Relegated: Sakaryaspor; Dardanelspor; Karabükspor
- Champions League: Galatasaray; Beşiktaş
- UEFA Cup: Fenerbahçe; Ankaragücü
- Intertoto Cup: Trabzonspor; Kocaelispor
- Matches played: 306
- Goals scored: 875 (2.86 per match)
- Top goalscorer: Hakan Şükür (19 goals)

Statistics of Turkish First Football League in the 1998–99 season.

== Overview ==
It was contested by 18 teams, and Galatasaray S.K. won the championship. And demotion of Sakaryaspor, Çanakkale Dardanelspor, Karabükspor was decided.

== League table ==
Pos	Team	Pld	W	D	L	GF	GA	GD	Pts	Qualification or relegation
1	Galatasaray (C)	34	23	9	2	85	30	+55	78	Qualification to Champions League third qualifying round
2	Beşiktaş	34	23	8	3	58	27	+31	77	Qualification to Champions League second qualifying round
3	Fenerbahçe	34	22	6	6	84	29	+55	72	Qualification to UEFA Cup first round
4	Trabzonspor	34	17	7	10	48	37	+11	58	Qualification to Intertoto Cup third round
5	Kocaelispor	34	14	8	12	44	37	+7	50	Qualification to Intertoto Cup second round
6	Antalyaspor	34	14	7	13	46	47	−1	49	
7	Gaziantepspor	34	12	12	10	51	48	+3	48	
8	Gençlerbirliği	34	12	10	12	49	47	+2	46	
9	İstanbulspor	34	12	7	15	48	55	−7	43	
10	Samsunspor	34	11	8	15	38	53	−15	41	
11	Altay	34	11	7	16	46	59	−13	40	
12	Bursaspor	34	11	6	17	51	69	−18	39	
13	Erzurumspor	34	10	9	15	40	64	−24	39	
14	MKE Ankaragücü	34	10	8	16	45	55	−10	38	Qualification to UEFA Cup qualifying round (Note: Finalists of 1998-99 Turkish Cup, Galatasaray and Beşiktaş, qualified for 1999-00 UEFA Champions League. A play-off match organized between the loser semi-finalists. Ankaragücü beat Sakaryaspor (5-0) and qualified for the 1999-00 UEFA Cup qualifying round.)
15	Adanaspor	34	10	8	16	37	53	−16	38	
16	Sakaryaspor (R)	34	9	8	17	44	52	−8	35	Relegation to Turkish Second Football League
17	Çanakkale Dardanelspor (R)	34	8	8	18	35	49	−14	32	Relegation to Turkish Second Football League
18	Kardemir Karabükspor (R)	34	5	8	21	26	64	−38	23	Relegation to Turkish Second Football League

Rules for classification: 1) points; 2) goal difference; 3) number of goals scored.
(C) Champions; (R) Relegated

== Results ==
Home \ Away	ADS	ALT	ANG	ANT	BJK	BUR	DAR	ERZ	FB	GS	GAZ	GBR	İST	KAR	KOC	SAK	SAM	TS
Adanaspor		2–0	1–0	4–2	0–1	4–1	3–0	2–0	0–3	2–2	3–1	1–1	0–1	2–0	1–1	2–1	0–0	0–2
Altay	3–2		5–1	2–4	0–1	4–1	1–1	3–1	0–4	0–2	0–0	0–0	2–1	1–0	3–1	2–0	2–0	2–5
Ankaragücü	2–2	2–1		0–0	0–1	2–2	3–0	3–0	2–4	2–2	1–1	0–1	5–0	1–1	0–2	1–0	3–4	1–0
Antalyaspor	2–0	4–2	1–4		0–3	0–0	2–0	1–0	1–0	1–1	3–1	1–1	2–3	3–1	2–1	2–2	1–2	0–1
Beşiktaş	2–0	1–1	4–1	2–1		3–3	0–0	2–1	3–2	1–1	1–1	2–0	2–1	1–1	0–3	3–0	0–0	2–0
Bursaspor	1–1	2–0	4–0	1–0	1–2		2–0	6–1	1–3	0–5	2–1	1–1	2–0	1–2	2–1	2–1	2–3	0–1
Dardanelspor	0–1	4–1	3–0	2–0	1–3	3–1		0–0	0–0	0–5	0–1	1–2	5–1	0–0	3–1	1–0	0–0	2–3
Erzurumspor	1–0	2–1	2–2	0–1	2–2	2–1	1–0		0–2	0–1	2–1	2–2	2–4	2–1	0–0	4–2	1–0	2–2
Fenerbahçe	6–0	5–0	2–1	3–1	1–2	4–1	3–1	4–1		2–2	4–0	3–0	2–0	4–1	1–1	3–0	6–2	1–0
Galatasaray	1–1	3–1	2–1	3–1	2–0	5–0	5–2	5–0	2–0		0–0	0–2	3–3	2–0	3–1	3–0	3–1	3–5
Gaziantepspor	3–1	1–1	1–0	1–1	2–0	5–2	1–0	3–0	2–2	1–2		2–2	2–1	4–2	1–2	2–0	1–1	1–1
Gençlerbirliği	2–1	1–1	3–1	1–2	0–1	1–4	0–0	5–1	0–3	1–2	3–0		2–3	2–1	1–1	1–0	3–0	0–1
İstanbulspor	6–0	3–0	1–4	0–1	0–2	2–3	1–1	0–2	1–2	1–4	0–0	0–0		3–0	2–1	4–0	2–1	0–0
Kardemir Karabükspor	2–0	1–1	0–1	2–1	1–2	1–0	1–0	1–1	0–0	0–3	2–6	1–6	2–2		0–1	1–2	0–3	0–0
Kocaelispor	2–1	2–1	0–1	2–1	0–2	4–0	2–0	1–1	0–3	1–2	1–1	2–0	0–1	2–0		0–1	1–0	1–1
Sakaryaspor	0–0	1–2	4–0	0–0	0–2	4–1	1–3	1–1	2–1	0–0	6–2	3–1	3–0	4–0	2–2		0–1	1–1
Samsunspor	2–0	1–0	0–0	0–1	0–3	1–1	2–1	2–4	1–1	0–3	2–1	2–4	0–1	2–1	0–1	2–2		2–1
Trabzonspor	2–0	0–3	1–0	2–3	1–2	2–0	2–1	3–1	1–0	0–3	0–1	4–0	0–0	1–0	0–3	2–1	3–1	

Legend: Blue = home team win; Yellow = draw; Red = away team win.

== Top scorers ==
Rank	Player	Club	Goals
1	(Turkey) Hakan Şükür	Galatasaray	19
2	(Bosnia and Herzegovina) Elvir Baljić	Fenerbahçe	17
3	(Turkey) Coşkun Birdal	Erzurumspor	15
3	(Romania) Viorel Moldovan	Fenerbahçe	15
5	(Turkey) Arif Erdem	Galatasaray	14
5	(Romania) Gheorghe Hagi	Galatasaray	14
7	(Turkey) Mehmet Özdilek	Beşiktaş	13
7	(Turkey) Ümit Karan	Gençlerbirliği	13
9	(Croatia) Davor Vugrinec	Trabzonspor	12
9	(Turkey) Serkan Aykut	Samsunspor	12
