= Serkan Aykut =

Turkish footballer (born 1975)

Personal information
- Date of birth: 24 February 1975 (age 51)
- Place of birth: Ankara, Turkey
- Height: 1.74 m (5 ft 9 in)
- Position: Striker

Senior career*
Years	Team	Apps	(Gls)
1995–2000	Samsunspor	204	(112)
2000–2002	Galatasaray	47	(25)
2002–2009	Samsunspor	116	(59)
Total		367	(196)

International career
1991	Turkey U18	2	(0)
1994–1997	Turkey U21	23	(12)
1997	Turkey U23	2	(0)
1997	Turkey	1	(0)
- * Club domestic league appearances and goals

Serkan Aykut (born 24 February 1975) is a Turkish former professional footballer who played as a forward.

Aykut began his professional career at Samsunspor. After becoming top scorer with 30 goals in the 1999–2000 season, he transferred to Galatasaray for $5.9 million. He played two seasons for Galatasaray successfully and won the UEFA Super Cup in 2000.

Aykut signed a contract with his former club Samsunspor in July 2002 for four years and one additional year as option. He later became captain of the team at Samsunspor.

== Honours ==
Galatasaray

- UEFA Super Cup: 2000
- Süper Lig: 2001-02
