= 1995–96 Galatasaray S.K. season =

Galatasaray
1995–96 season
- President: (Turkey) Alp Yalman (until 16 March 1996) (Turkey) Faruk Süren
- Manager: (Scotland) Graeme Souness
- Stadium: Ali Sami Yen Stadı
- 1. Lig: 4th
- Turkish Cup: Winners
- UEFA Cup: Preliminary round
- Top goalscorer: League: Hakan Şükür (16); All: Dean Saunders (21)
- Highest home attendance: 28,539 vs Beşiktaş JK (1. Lig, 17 December 1995)
- Lowest home attendance: 8,369 vs Denizlispor (1. Lig, 19 May 1996)
- Average home league attendance: 16,843
Home colours	Away colours	Third colours

The 1995–96 season was Galatasaray's 92nd in existence and the 38th consecutive season in the 1. Lig. This article shows statistics of the club's players in the season, and also lists all matches that the club have played in the season.

== Squad statistics ==
No.	Pos.	Name	1. Lig		Türkiye Kupası		UEFA Cup		Total	
No.	Pos.	Name	Apps	Goals	Apps	Goals	Apps	Goals	Apps	Goals
-	GK	(Turkey) Hayrettin Demirbaş	2	0	0	0	0	0	2	0
-	GK	(Turkey) Nezih Boloğlu	3	0	0	0	2	0	5	0
12	GK	(United States) Brad Friedel	30	0	7	0	0	0	37	0
-	DF	(Turkey) İsmail Göksel Şenyüz	10	0	0	0	0	0	10	0
-	DF	(Turkey) Bekir Gür	11	1	1	0	2	0	14	1
2	DF	(England) Barry Venison	8	0	0	0	2	0	10	0
5	DF	(England) Mike Marsh	3	0	0	0	0	0	3	0
3	DF	(Turkey) Bülent Korkmaz	29	0	6	0	2	0	37	0
6	DF	(Turkey) Mert Korkmaz	19	0	3	0	0	0	22	0
4	DF	(Netherlands) Ulrich van Gobbel	16	2	6	0	0	0	22	2
-	DF	(Turkey) Ufuk Talay	18	1	7	0	0	0	25	1
-	DF	(Turkey) Feti Okuroğlu	30	2	7	0	2	0	39	2
-	DF	(Turkey) Hakan Ünsal	28	1	6	1	2	0	36	2
-	MF	(Turkey) Ergün Penbe	18	0	7	0	0	0	25	0
7	MF	(Turkey) Okan Buruk	28	1	3	0	2	0	33	1
-	MF	(Turkey) Evren Turhan	15	1	5	0	0	0	20	1
-	MF	(Turkey) İlyas Kahraman	21	0	4	0	0	0	25	0
8	MF	(Turkey) Tugay Kerimoğlu (C)	30	3	6	0	2	0	38	3
-	MF	(Turkey) Suat Kaya	28	5	0	5	2	0	35	5
-	MF	(Turkey) Ceyhun Eriş	2	0	1	0	0	0	3	0
11	MF	(Turkey) Kubilay Türkyılmaz	10	3	0	0	2	0	12	3
-	MF	(Turkey) Yusuf Tepekule	3	0	0	0	1	0	4	0
-	FW	(Turkey) Arif Erdem	32	8	7	2	2	0	41	9
-	FW	(Turkey) Uğur Tütüneker	7	0	0	0	1	0	8	0
10	FW	(Wales) Dean Saunders	24	15	4	4	2	2	30	21
-	FW	(Turkey) Saffet Sancaklı	11	7	1	2	2	0	14	9
-	FW	(Turkey) Gökhan Şükür	1	0	0	0	0	0	1	0
9	FW	(Turkey) Hakan Şükür	24	16	7	2	0	0	31	18

=== Players in / out ===
==== In ====
Pos.	Nat.	Name	Age	Moving from
GK	(United States)	Brad Friedel	24	Brøndby IF
GK	(Turkey)	Mehmet Duymazer	21	Kayserispor
DF	(England)	Mike Marsh	26	Coventry City F.C.
DF	(England)	Barry Venison	31	Newcastle United F.C.
FW	(Wales)	Dean Saunders	31	Dean Saunders
MF	(Turkey)	Ufuk Talay	19	Marconi Stallions FC
DF	(Netherlands)	Ulrich van Gobbel	24	Feyenoord
MF	(Turkey)	Evren Turhan	21	Kocaelispor

==== Out ====
Pos.	Nat.	Name	Age	Moving to
FW	(Turkey)	Erdal Keser	33	career end
GK	(Lithuania)	Gintaras Staučė	26	Karşıyaka S.K. on loan
FW	(Turkey)	Hakan Şükür	23	Torino F.C.
MF	(Turkey)	Hamza Hamzaoğlu	25	Istanbulspor
DF	(Zimbabwe)	Norman Mapeza	23	MKE Ankaragücü on loan
DF	(Turkey)	Cihat Arslan	25	Eskişehirspor on loan
DF	(Turkey)	Sedat Balkanlı	30	Eskişehirspor on loan
DF	(North Macedonia)	Stevica Kuzmanovski	33	Eskişehirspor
DF	(England)	Barry Venison	32	Southampton F.C.
DF	(England)	Mike Marsh	26	Southend United F.C.
MF	(Turkey)	Kubilay Türkyılmaz	28	Grasshopper Club Zürich
FW	(Turkey)	Saffet Sancaklı	29	Kocaelispor
MF	(Turkey)	Yusuf Tepekule	27	Karşıyaka SK on loan
MF	(Turkey)	Osman Akyol	26	Antalyaspor on loan
GK	(Turkey)	Nezih Ali Boloğlu	31	Eskişehirspor on loan

== 1. Lig ==
=== Standings ===
Pos	Team	Pld	W	D	L	GF	GA	GD	Pts	Qualification or relegation
2	Trabzonspor	34	26	4	4	79	24	+55	82	Qualification to UEFA Cup qualifying round
3	Beşiktaş	34	22	3	9	74	46	+28	69	Qualification to UEFA Cup qualifying round
4	Galatasaray	34	21	5	8	67	38	+29	68	Qualification to Cup Winners' Cup first round
5	Kocaelispor	34	16	11	7	61	43	+18	59	Qualification to Intertoto Cup group stage
6	Gaziantepspor	34	14	7	13	42	43	−1	49	Qualification to Intertoto Cup group stage

Rules for classification: 1) points; 2) goal difference; 3) number of goals scored.

=== Matches ===
13 August 1995 1	Vanspor	0–1	Galatasaray SK	Van
16:00 EET		(Report)	Tugay Kerimoğlu 39'	Stadium: Atatürk Stadı; Referee: Galip Bitigen

19 August 1995 2	Galatasaray SK	3–1	Altay S.K.	Istanbul
19:00 EET	Dean Saunders 68', 80'; Saffet Sancaklı 74'	Report	Edema Fuludu 88'	Stadium: Ali Sami Yen Stadı; Attendance: 20,018; Referee: Vahap Beyaz

26 August 1995 3	Kayserispor	1–2	Galatasaray SK	Kayseri
16:30 EET	Moussa Ndaw 67'	Report	Suat Kaya 35'; Arif Erdem 68'	Stadium: Kayseri Atatürk Stadium; Referee: Mustafa Çulcu

9 September 1995 4	Galatasaray SK	0–1	Gençlerbirliği SK	Istanbul
19:00 EET		Report	Ali Işık 34'	Stadium: Ali Sami Yen Stadı; Attendance: 17,615; Referee: Ayhan Yücebilgiç

17 September 1995 5	Antalyaspor	0–2	Galatasaray SK	Antalya
16:30 EET		(Report)	Dean Saunders 11'; Kubilay Türkyılmaz 84' (pen.)	Stadium: Atatürk Stadı; Referee: İbrahim Aksoy

22 September 1995 6	Galatasaray SK	1–0	Samsunspor	Istanbul
19:00 EET	Arif Erdem 89'	Report		Stadium: Ali Sami Yen Stadı; Attendance: 19,744; Referee: Oğuz Sarvan

1 October 1995 7	Trabzonspor	4–1	Galatasaray SK	Trabzon
19:00 EET	Hami Mandıralı 17', 48'; Shota Arveladze 36', 71'	Report	Kubilay Türkyılmaz 55'	Stadium: Hüseyin Avni Aker Stadium; Referee: Metin Tokat

14 October 1995 8	Galatasaray SK	4–2	Istanbulspor	Istanbul
19:00 EET	Dean Saunders 48' (pen.), 89'; Arif Erdem 54'; Kubilay Türkyılmaz 80'	Report	Bülent Korkmaz 34' (o.g.); Saffet Akyüz 47'	Stadium: Ali Sami Yen Stadı; Attendance: 25,153; Referee: Serdar Çakır

22 October 1995 9	Fenerbahçe SK	3–1	Galatasaray SK	Istanbul
19:00 EET	Dalian Atkinson 4', 19', 32'	Report	Saffet Sancaklı 83'	Stadium: Şükrü Saracoğlu Stadium; Attendance: 26,420; Referee: Ayhan Yücebilgiç

28 October 1995 10	Galatasaray SK	3–0	Karşıyaka SK	Istanbul
19:00 EET	Serhat Güller 24' (o.g.); Suat Kaya 30'; Dean Saunders 64' (pen.)	Report		Stadium: Ali Sami Yen Stadı; Attendance: 14,409; Referee: Metin Tokat

4 November 1995 11	Eskişehirspor	1–2	Galatasaray SK	Eskişehir
12:00 EET	Ali Rıza Heper 77'	(Report)	Dean Saunders 32'; Hakan Şükür 64'	Stadium: Atatürk Stadı; Referee: Galip Bitigen

19 November 1995 12	Galatasaray SK	5–0	MKE Ankaragücü	Istanbul
19:00 EET	Saffet Sancaklı 23', 53'; Tugay Kerimoğlu 38'; Hakan Şükür 45' (pen.), 65'	Report		Stadium: Ali Sami Yen Stadı; Attendance: 15,623; Referee: Nedim Göklü

25 November 1995 13	Gaziantepspor	1–1	Galatasaray SK	Gaziantep
12:00 EET	Serkan Özen 54'	Report	Saffet Sancaklı 8'	Stadium: Kamil Ocak Stadium; Referee: Hamza Işın

2 December 1995 14	Galatasaray SK	3–1	Bursaspor	Istanbul
19:00 EET	Saffet Sancaklı 31' (pen.), 46'; Hakan Şükür 57'	Report	Hakan Keleş 88'	Stadium: Ali Sami Yen Stadı; Attendance: 21,902; Referee: İbrahim Aksoy

10 December 1995 15	Kocaelispor	1–1	Galatasaray SK	İzmit
19:00 EET	Faruk Yiğit 63'	Report	Arif Erdem 60'	Stadium: İsmet Paşa Stadium; Referee: Ünsal Çimen

17 December 1995 16	Galatasaray SK	1–3	Beşiktaş JK	Istanbul
19:00 EET	Ufuk Talay 27'	Report	Ertuğrul Sağlam 16' (pen.); Mehmet Özdilek 53'; Sergen Yalçın 62'	Stadium: Ali Sami Yen Stadı; Attendance: 28,539; Referee: Muhittin Boşat

23 December 1995 17	Denizlispor	1–3	Galatasaray SK	Denizli
12:00 EET	Mehmet Altıparmak 3'	(Report)	Hakan Ünsal 44'; Hakan Şükür 55'; Arif Erdem 81'	Stadium: Atatürk Stadı; Referee: Galip Bitigen

28 January 1996 18	Galatasaray SK	2–0	Vanspor	Istanbul
19:00 EET	Hakan Şükür 28' (pen.); Ulrich van Gobbel 89' (pen.)	Report		Stadium: Ali Sami Yen Stadı; Attendance: 11,868; Referee: Nedim Göklü

3 February 1996 19	Altay SK	2–5	Galatasaray SK	İzmir
19:00 EET	Orhan Üstündağ 35'; Edema Fuludu 66'	Report	Ulrich Van Gobbel 47'; Feti Okuroğlu 73', 79'; Hakan Şükür 84' (pen.), 88'	Stadium: İzmir Atatürk Stadium; Attendance: 10,955; Referee: İlhami Kaplan

11 February 1996 20	Galatasaray SK	5–0	Kayserispor	Istanbul
19:00 EET	Suat Kaya 7', 70'; Hakan Şükür 20', 38'; Arif Erdem 47'	Report		Stadium: Ali Sami Yen Stadı; Attendance: 9,040; Referee: Murat Ilgaz

17 February 1996 21	Gençlerbirliği SK	1–2	Galatasaray SK	Ankara
19:00 EET	Andre Kona 12'	Report	Dean Saunders 65', 88'	Stadium: Ankara 19 Mayıs Stadium; Referee: Ünsal Çimen

25 February 1996 22	Galatasaray SK	1–2	Antalyaspor	Istanbul
19:00 EET	Suat Kaya 54'	Report	Fani Madida 50'; Thompson Oliha 87'	Stadium: Ali Sami Yen Stadı; Referee: Erol Ersoy

2 March 1996 23	Samsunspor	3–2	Galatasaray SK	Samsun
19:00 EET	Uğur Dağdelen 5'; Cenk İşler 49'; Serkan Aykut 88'	Report	Bekir Gür 30'; Hakan Şükür 39'	Stadium: Samsun 19 Mayıs Stadium; Referee: Mustafa Çulcu

9 March 1996 24	Galatasaray SK	0–0	Trabzonspor	Istanbul
19:00 EET		(Report)		Stadium: Ali Sami Yen Stadı; Attendance: 16,354; Referee: Vahap Beyaz

16 March 1996 25	Istanbulspor	1–1	Galatasaray SK	Istanbul
19:00 EET	Oleg Salenko 20'	(Report)	Hakan Şükür 68'	Stadium: İnönü Stadium; Attendance: 2,487; Referee: Osman Avcı

22 March 1996 26	Galatasaray SK	2–0	Fenerbahçe SK	Istanbul
19:00 EET	Hakan Şükür 65'; Arif Erdem 88'	Report		Stadium: Ali Sami Yen Stadı; Referee: Muhittin Boşat

30 March 1996 27	Karşıyaka SK	0–3	Galatasaray SK	İzmir
19:00 EET		Report	Hakan Şükür 1'; Okan Buruk 60'; Dean Saunders 89'	Stadium: İzmir Atatürk Stadium; Referee: Ayhan Yücebilgiç

7 April 1996 28	Galatasaray SK	3–0	Eskişehirspor	Istanbul
19:00 EET	Dean Saunders 62', 72'; Hakan Şükür 87'	Report		Stadium: Ali Sami Yen Stadı; Attendance: 13,074; Referee: Engin Kurt

14 April 1996 29	MKE Ankaragücü	2–2	Galatasaray SK	Ankara
12:00 EET	Ramazan Tunç 6', 68'	Report	Arif Erdem 24'; Dean Saunders 49'	Stadium: Ankara 19 Mayıs Stadium; Attendance: 10,456; Referee: Alican Lakot

20 April 1996 30	Galatasaray SK	2–0	Gaziantepspor	Istanbul
19:00 EET	Dean Saunders 41'; Tugay Kerimoğlu 47'	Report		Stadium: Ali Sami Yen Stadı; Referee: Selçuk Şahin

27 April 1996 31	Bursaspor	2–0	Galatasaray SK	Bursa
19:00 EET	Şaban Yıldırım 28'; Majid Musisi 62'	(Report)		Stadium: Bursa Atatürk Stadı; Referee: Kadir Tozlu

4 May 1996 32	Galatasaray SK	0–4	Kocaelispor	Istanbul
19:00 EET		Report	Saffet Sancaklı 5' (pen.), 63', 87'; Roman Dąbrowski 81'	Stadium: İnönü Stadium; Attendance: 14,095; Referee: Erol Ersoy

11 May 1996 33	Beşiktaş JK	1–2	Galatasaray SK	Istanbul
19:00 EET	Stefan Kuntz 87'	Report	Evren Nuri Turhan 41'; Hakan Şükür 72'	Stadium: İnönü Stadium; Attendance: 13,250; Referee: Orhan Erdemir

19 May 1996 34	Galatasaray SK	1–0	Denizlispor	Istanbul
16:00 EET	Dean Saunders 57'	Report		Stadium: İnönü Stadium; Attendance: 8,369; Referee: Sadık İlhan

== Türkiye Kupası ==
Kick-off listed in local time (EET)

=== 6th round ===
14 December 1995 1	Galatasaray SK	4–0	Denizlispor	Istanbul
19:00 EET	Saffet Sancaklı 25', 68'; Hakan Ünsal 51'; Hakan Şükür 63'	(Report)		Stadium: Ali Sami Yen Stadı; Attendance: 11,037; Referee: Vahap Beyaz

=== 1/4 Final ===
23 January 1996 1	Galatasaray SK	0–0	Beşiktaş JK	Istanbul
19:00 EET		(Report)		Stadium: Ali Sami Yen Stadı; Attendance: 11,984; Referee: Vahap Beyaz

6 February 1996 2	Beşiktaş JK	1–2	Galatasaray SK	Istanbul
20:00 EET	Ertuğrul Sağlam 45'	(Report)	Arif Erdem 10', 67'	Stadium: İnönü Stadı; Attendance: 18,504; Referee: Ahmet Çakar

=== 1/2 Final ===
28 February 1996 1	Galatasaray SK	3–1	Samsunspor	Istanbul
19:00 EET	Dean Saunders 16', 90'; Hakan Şükür 42'	(Report)	Daniel Timofte 44'	Stadium: İnönü Stadı; Attendance: 11,984; Referee: İbrahim Aksoy

13 March 1996 2	Samsunspor	1–0	Galatasaray SK	Samsun
20:00 EET	Ercan Koloğlu 35'	(Report)		Stadium: 19 Mayıs Stadı; Referee: Nedim Göklü

=== Final ===
11 April 1996 1	Galatasaray SK	1–0	Fenerbahçe SK	Istanbul
19:00 EET	Dean Saunders 5' (pen.)	(Report)		Stadium: Ali Sami Yen Stadı; Attendance: 24,285; Referee: Ahmet Çakar

24 April 1996 1	Fenerbahçe SK	1–1	Galatasaray SK	Istanbul
19:00 EET	Aykut Kocaman 34'	(Report)	Dean Saunders 116'	Stadium: Fenerbahçe Stadı; Attendance: 26,420; Referee: Ayhan Yücebilgiç

== UEFA Cup ==
=== Preliminary round ===
8 August 1995 1	AC Sparta Prague	3–1	Galatasaray SK	Prague
	Pavel Nedvěd 18', 73'; Vratislav Lokvenc 23'	(Report)	Dean Saunders 56'	Stadium: Letná Stadium; Referee: (Portugal) Joao Pinto Correia

22 August 1995 2	Galatasaray SK	1–1	AC Sparta Prague	Istanbul
	Dean Saunders 3'	(Report)	Pavel Nedvěd 23'	Stadium: Ali Sami Yen Stadı; Attendance: 27,762; Referee: (Italy) Gianni Beschin

== Friendly Matches ==
Kick-off listed in local time (EET)

=== TSYD Kupası ===
2 August 1995 1	Galatasaray SK	1–3	Fenerbahçe SK	Istanbul
20:00 EET	Saffet Sancaklı 38'	(Report)	Elvir Bolić 32', 84'; Aykut Kocaman 55'	Stadium: Fenerbahçe Stadı; Attendance: 15,726; Referee: Serdar Çakır

4 August 1995 2	Beşiktaş JK	3–0	Galatasaray SK	Istanbul
20:00 EET	Orhan Kaynak 20', 79'; Sergen Yalçın 26'	(Report)		Stadium: Ali Sami Yen Stadı; Attendance: 7,518; Referee: Muhittin Boşat

== Attendance ==
Competition	Av. Att.	Total Att.
1. Lig	16,843	235,803
Türkiye Kupası	15,769	47,306
UEFA Cup	27,762	27,762
Total	16,362	310,871

== Bibliography ==
- Tuncay, Bülent (2002). Galatasaray Tarihi. Yapı Kredi Yayınları ISBN 975-08-0454-6
