= 1994–95 Galatasaray S.K. season =

Galatasaray
1994–95 season
- President: (Turkey) Alp Yalman
- Manager: (Germany) Reinhard Saftig (until 15 March 1995) (Turkey) Müfit Erkasap (Interim)
- Stadium: Ali Sami Yen Stadı
- 1. Lig: 3rd
- Türkiye Kupası: Runner-up
- Champions League: Group stage
- Top goalscorer: League: Saffet Sancaklı (24); All: Saffet Sancaklı (29)
- Highest home attendance: 61,810 vs FC Avenir Beggen (Champions League, 24 August 1994)
- Lowest home attendance: 10,860 vs Antalyaspor (1. Lig, 15 March 1995)
- Average home league attendance: 22,725
Home colours	Away colours	Third colours

The 1994–95 season was Galatasaray's 91st in existence and the 37th consecutive season in the 1. Lig. This article shows statistics of the club's players in the season, and also lists all matches that the club have played in the season.

== Squad statistics ==
No.	Pos.	Name	1. Lig		Türkiye Kupası		Champions League		Total	
No.	Pos.	Name	Apps	Goals	Apps	Goals	Apps	Goals	Apps	Goals
-	GK	(Turkey) Hayrettin Demirbaş	0	0	0	0	0	0	0	0
-	GK	(Turkey) Nezih Boloğlu	7	0	2	0	2	0	11	0
12	GK	(Lithuania) Gintaras Staučė	27	0	5	0	6	0	38	0
-	DF	(Turkey) Bekir Gür	7	0	0	0	1	0	8	0
3	DF	(Turkey) Bülent Korkmaz	31	1	6	0	8	0	45	1
2	DF	(Turkey) Mert Korkmaz	20	0	4	0	6	0	30	0
4	DF	(North Macedonia) Stevica Kuzmanovski	7	0	0	0	1	0	8	0
-	DF	(Turkey) Cihat Arslan	0	0	0	0	1	0	1	0
-	DF	(Turkey) Feti Okuroğlu	14	0	6	0	0	0	0	0
5	DF	(Turkey) Hakan Ünsal	12	0	3	1	0	1	16	1
6	MF	(Turkey) Ergün Penbe	14	0	2	0	3	0	19	0
7	MF	(Turkey) Okan Buruk	20	0	5	1	2	0	27	1
-	MF	(Turkey) Hamza Hamzaoğlu	25	3	3	0	7	0	35	3
-	MF	(Turkey) İlyas Kahraman	2	0	0	0	0	0	0	0
8	MF	(Turkey) Tugay Kerimoğlu (C)	23	1	6	2	7	0	36	3
10	MF	(Turkey) Suat Kaya	27	8	7	3	5	0	39	11
-	MF	(Turkey) Sedat Balkanlı	24	6	5	1	7	0	36	7
-	MF	(Turkey) Kubilay Türkyılmaz	21	9	1	0	7	2	29	11
-	MF	(Turkey) Yusuf Tepekule	18	0	5	0	6	0	29	0
-	MF	(Turkey) Osman Akyol	8	0	1	0	4	0	13	0
11	FW	(Turkey) Arif Erdem	32	2	7	1	8	3	47	6
-	FW	(Turkey) Uğur Tütüneker	10	0	6	0	1	0	17	0
-	FW	(Zimbabwe) Norman Mapeza	26	2	5	0	7	0	38	2
-	FW	(Turkey) Saffet Sancaklı	32	24	5	3	6	2	43	29
9	FW	(Turkey) Hakan Şükür	33	19	7	0	8	5	48	24

=== Players in / out ===
==== In ====
Pos.	Nat.	Name	Age	Moving from
FW	(Turkey)	Saffet Sancaklı	28	Kocaelispor
DF	(North Macedonia)	Stevica Kuzmanovski	32	Kocaelispor
DF	(Turkey)	Sedat Balkanlı	29	Bursaspor
FW	(Zimbabwe)	Norman Mapeza	22	Zagłębie Lubin
MF	(Turkey)	Ergün Penbe	22	Gençlerbirliği SK
DF	(Turkey)	Hakan Ünsal	21	Kardemir Karabükspor
MF	(Turkey)	Osman Akyol	25	Samsunspor
GK	(Lithuania)	Gintaras Staučė	25	FC Spartak Moscow
DF	(Turkey)	Bekir Gür	22	Yeni Turgutluspor
DF	(Turkey)	Feti Okuroğlu	23	Bursaspor

==== Out ====
Pos.	Nat.	Name	Age	Moving to
DF	(Turkey)	Muhammet Altıntaş	30	career end
DF	(Turkey)	İsmail Demiriz	31	career end
DF	(Germany)	Reinhard Stumpf	33	1. FC Köln
MF	(Germany)	Falko Götz	32	1. FC Saarbrücken
DF	(Turkey)	Yusuf Altıntaş	33	Kocaelispor
MF	(Turkey)	Cengizhan Hınçal	20	Kocaelispor
MF	(Turkey)	Mustafa Kocabey	19	Kocaelispor
GK	(Turkey)	Hayrettin Demirbaş	31	Vanspor on loan
DF	(Turkey)	Cihat Arslan	24	Denizlispor
DF	(Turkey)	Soner Tolungüç	30	Antalyaspor
FW	(Turkey)	Benhur Babaoğlu	24	Antalyaspor
DF	(North Macedonia)	Stevica Kuzmanovski	32	Antalyaspor

== 1. Lig ==
=== Standings ===
Pos	Team	Pld	W	D	L	GF	GA	GD	Pts	Qualification or relegation
1	Beşiktaş (C)	34	24	7	3	80	26	+54	79	Qualification to Champions League qualifying round
2	Trabzonspor	34	23	7	4	80	28	+52	76	Qualification to Cup Winners' Cup first round
3	Galatasaray	34	21	6	7	76	38	+38	69	Qualification to UEFA Cup preliminary round
4	Fenerbahçe	34	20	7	7	78	35	+43	67	Qualification to UEFA Cup preliminary round
5	Gençlerbirliği	34	17	8	9	61	45	+16	59	Qualification to Intertoto Cup group stage

Rules for classification: 1) points; 2) goal difference; 3) number of goals scored.
(C) Champions

=== Matches ===
14 August 1994 1	Galatasaray SK	3–1	Gençlerbirliği SK	Istanbul
19:00 EET	Saffet Sancaklı 15', 85'; Arif Erdem 80'	Report	Andre Kona 54'	Stadium: Ali Sami Yen Stadium; Attendance: 28,290; Referee: Mustafa Çulcu

20 August 1994 2	Petrol Ofisi Spor	0–3	Galatasaray SK	Ankara
19:00 EET		Report	Kubilay Türkyılmaz 18'; Saffet Sancaklı 46'; Bülent Korkmaz 85'	Stadium: Ankara 19 Mayıs Stadium; Attendance: 14,943; Referee: Ünsal Çimen

28 August 1994 3	Galatasaray SK	3–1	Altay S.K.	Istanbul
19:00 EET	Hakan Şükür 63' (pen.), 74'; Saffet Sancaklı 66'	Report	Ahmet Akuygur 79'	Stadium: Ali Sami Yen Stadı; Attendance: 28,756; Referee: Ahmet Çakar

11 September 1994 4	Antalyaspor	0–5	Galatasaray SK	Antalya
19:00 EET		(Report)	Kubilay Türkyılmaz 15'; Saffet Sancaklı 17', 54'; Hakan Şükür 18'; Hamza Hamzaoğlu 44'	Stadium: Atatürk Stadı; Referee: Serdar Çakman

18 September 1994 5	Galatasaray SK	2–1	Kayserispor	Istanbul
19:00 EET	Sedat Balkanlı 23'; Saffet Sancaklı 75'	Report	Hayrettin Kılıç 27'	Stadium: Ali Sami Yen Stadı; Attendance: 28,267; Referee: İbrahim Aksoy

24 September 1994 6	Samsunspor	2–2	Galatasaray SK	Samsun
16:00 EET	Serkan Aykut 46', 54'	Report	Saffet Sancaklı 20'; Sedat Balkanlı 89'	Stadium: Samsun 19 Mayıs Stadium; Referee: Vahap Beyaz

2 October 1994 7	Galatasaray SK	3–1	Beşiktaş JK	Istanbul
19:00 EET	Norman Mapeza 78', 84' (pen.); Saffet Sancaklı 88'	Report	Sergen Yalçın 49'	Stadium: Ali Sami Yen Stadı; Attendance: 31,325; Referee: Bülent Yavuz

8 October 1994 8	Gaziantepspor	2–2	Galatasaray SK	Gaziantep
12:00 EET	Mehmet Gönülaçar 21'; Kubilay Toptaş 61'	Report	Kubilay Türkyılmaz 75'; Hakan Şükür 83'	Stadium: Kamil Ocak Stadium; Referee: Oğuz Sarvan

15 October 1994 9	Galatasaray SK	1–1	Fenerbahçe SK	Istanbul
19:00 EET	Sedat Balkanlı 71'	Report	Bülent Uygun 42'	Stadium: Ali Sami Yen Stadı; Attendance: 27,862; Referee: Serdar Çakman

23 October 1994 10	MKE Ankaragücü	2–1	Galatasaray SK	Ankara
19:00 EET	N'Dayi Kalenga 32', 88'	Report	Sedat Balkanlı 19'	Stadium: Ankara 19 Mayıs Stadium; Attendance: 13,669; Referee: Metin Tokat

29 October 1994 11	Galatasaray SK	4–0	Denizlispor	Istanbul
19:00 EET	Suat Kaya 22', 80', 84'; Saffet Sancaklı 75'	Report		Stadium: Ali Sami Yen Stadı; Attendance: 26,135; Referee: Nedim Göklü

6 November 1994 12	Kocaelispor	0–2	Galatasaray SK	İzmit
12:00 EET		Report	Kubilay Türkyılmaz 43' (pen.), 62'	Stadium: İsmet Paşa Stadium; Referee: Serdar Çakman

13 November 1994 13	Galatasaray SK	4–1	Vanspor	Istanbul
19:00 EET	Kubilay Türkyılmaz 19'; Hakan Şükür 55'; Saffet Sancaklı 73'; Sedat Balkanlı 76'	Report	Atnan Baytar 53'	Stadium: Ali Sami Yen Stadı; Attendance: 20,026; Referee: Ayhan Yücebilgiç

19 November 1994 14	Adana Demirspor	1–2	Galatasaray SK	Adana
12:00 EET	Hamit Yüksel 81'	(Report)	Hakan Şükür 13'; Saffet Sancaklı 36'	Stadium: Adana 5 Ocak Stadı; Referee: Metin Tokat

27 November 1994 15	Galatasaray SK	2–1	Trabzonspor	Istanbul
19:00 EET	Saffet Sancaklı 25'; Hakan Şükür 82'	(Report)	Cengiz Atila 28'	Stadium: Ali Sami Yen Stadı; Attendance: 28,033; Referee: Ahmet Çakar

3 December 1994 16	Bursaspor	2–1	Galatasaray SK	Bursa
19:00 EET	Ömer Kılıç 40'; Hakan Keleş 88'	(Report)	Kubilay Türkyılmaz 89'	Stadium: Bursa Atatürk Stadı; Referee: Bülent Yavuz

18 December 1994 17	Galatasaray SK	4–0	Zeytinburnuspor	Istanbul
19:00 EET	Hakan Şükür 3'; Saffet Sancaklı 50', 65'; Kubilay Türkyılmaz 74'	Report		Stadium: Ali Sami Yen Stadı; Attendance: 14,465; Referee: Serdar Çakır

22 January 1995 18	Gençlerbirliği SK	3–1	Galatasaray SK	Ankara
19:00 EET	Tarık Daşgün 10'; Erkut Çağdaş 22', 63'	Report	Saffet Sancaklı 55' (pen.)	Stadium: Ankara 19 Mayıs Stadium; Attendance: 4,944; Referee: Oğuz Sarvan

29 January 1995 19	Galatasaray SK	2–0	Petrol Ofisi Spor	Istanbul
19:00 EET	Saffet Sancaklı 17'; Suat Kaya 57'	Report		Stadium: Ali Sami Yen Stadı; Attendance: 23,922; Referee: Erol Ersoy

5 February 1995 20	Altay SK	0–3	Galatasaray SK	İzmir
19:00 EET		Report	Suat Kaya 31'; Hamza Hamzaoğlu 53'; Arif Erdem 86'	Stadium: İzmir Atatürk Stadium; Attendance: 20,204; Referee: Galip Bitigen

19 February 1995 22	Kayserispor	0–2	Galatasaray SK	Kayseri
12:00 EET		Report	İlhan Sancaktar 10' (o.g.); Suat Kaya 59'	Stadium: Kayseri Atatürk Stadium; Referee: Ünsal Çimen

26 February 1995 23	Galatasaray SK	0–1	Samsunspor	Istanbul
19:00 EET		Report	Celil Sağır 85'	Stadium: Ali Sami Yen Stadı; Attendance: 21,485; Referee: İbrahim Aksoy

5 March 1995 24	Beşiktaş JK	2–3	Galatasaray SK	Istanbul
19:00 EET	Ertuğrul Sağlam 22'; Sergen Yalçın 70'	Report	Hakan Şükür 3', 66'; Suat Kaya 75'	Stadium: İnönü Stadium; Referee: Ahmet Çakar

12 March 1995 25	Galatasaray SK	1–2	Gaziantepspor	Istanbul
19:00 EET	Hamza Hamzaoğlu 36'	Report	Elvir Bolić 6' (pen.), 26'	Stadium: Ali Sami Yen Stadı; Attendance: 26,329; Referee: Alican Lakot

15 March 1995 21	Galatasaray SK	0–3	Antalyaspor	Istanbul
17:00 EET		Report	Murat Özduran 26', 44'; Kadir Durum 70'	Stadium: Ali Sami Yen Stadı; Attendance: 10,860; Referee: Mustafa Çulcu

19 March 1995 26	Fenerbahçe SK	3–0	Galatasaray SK	Istanbul
19:00 EET	Aykut Kocaman 12' (pen.), 37' (pen.), 61'	Report		Stadium: Şükrü Saracoğlu Stadium; Attendance: 19,479; Referee: Metin Tokat

25 March 1995 27	Galatasaray SK	2–1	MKE Ankaragücü	Istanbul
19:00 EET	Saffet Sancaklı 47'; Sedat Balkanlı 72'	Report	Mehmet Yıldırım 63'	Stadium: Ali Sami Yen Stadı; Attendance: 16,891; Referee: Ayhan Yücebilgiç

2 April 1995 28	Denizlispor	0–0	Galatasaray SK	Denizli
12:00 EET		(Report)		Stadium: Atatürk Stadı; Referee: Turgut Sığıç

9 April 1995 29	Galatasaray SK	4–1	Kocaelispor	Istanbul
19:00 EET	Hakan Şükür 5', 68', 87'; Suat Kaya 85'	Report	Halil İbrahim Kara 45'	Stadium: Ali Sami Yen Stadı; Attendance: 14,984; Referee: Sabri Çelik

16 April 1995 30	Vanspor	1–2	Galatasaray SK	Van
12:00 EET	Hüseyin Sarıçan 35'	(Report)	Hakan Şükür 14', 89'	Stadium: Atatürk Stadı; Referee: İbrahim Aksoy

29 April 1995 31	Galatasaray SK	3–0	Adana Demirspor	Istanbul
19:00 EET	Saffet Sancaklı 29', 33'; Hakan Şükür 61'	Report		Stadium: Ali Sami Yen Stadı; Attendance: 16,677; Referee: Erol Ersoy

6 May 1995 32	Trabzonspor	2–2	Galatasaray SK	Trabzon
19:00 EET	Hami Mandıralı 8', 57'	Report	Saffet Sancaklı 6'; Hakan Şükür 79'	Stadium: Hüseyin Avni Aker Stadium; Referee: Ünsal Çimen

13 May 1995 33	Galatasaray SK	0–0	Bursaspor	Istanbul
19:00 EET		Report		Stadium: Ali Sami Yen Stadı; Attendance: 22,021; Referee: Oğuz Sarvan

21 May 1995 34	Zeytinburnuspor	3–7	Galatasaray SK	Istanbul
19:00 EET	Reha Kapsal 16', 24'; Kadri Sancak 22' (pen.)	Report	Saffet Sancaklı 45', 53', 79'; Hakan Şükür 70', 88'; Kubilay Türkyılmaz 72'; Tugay Kerimoğlu 77'	Stadium: Ali Sami Yen Stadı; Attendance: 7,955; Referee: Orhan Erdemir

== Türkiye Kupası ==
Kick-off listed in local time (EET)

=== 6th round ===
30 November 1994 1	Petrol Ofisi SK	0–2	Galatasaray SK	Ankara
19:00 EET		(Report)	Suat Kaya 53'; Tugay Kerimoğlu 58'	Stadium: 19 Mayıs Stadı; Attendance: 4,389; Referee: Galip Bitigen

=== 1/4 final ===
18 January 1995 1	Bursaspor	1–1	Galatasaray SK	Bursa
19:00 EET	Tuncay Akgün 38'	(Report)	Saffet Sancaklı 87' (pen.)	Stadium: Bursa Atatürk Stadı; Referee: Vahap Beyaz

25 January 1995 2	Galatasaray SK	5–2	Bursaspor	Istanbul
19:00 EET	Suat Kaya 2'; Saffet Sancaklı 17'; Okan Buruk 30'; Hakan Ünsal 40'; Arif Erdem 82'	(Report)	Ivko Ganchev 20' (pen.); Hakan Keleş 85'	Stadium: Ali Sami Yen Stadı; Attendance: 18,078; Referee: Mustafa Çulcu

=== 1/2 final ===
8 February 1995 1	Fenerbahçe SK	1–1	Galatasaray SK	Istanbul
19:00 EET	Aykut Kocaman 72' (pen.)	(Report)	Saffet Sancaklı 69'	Stadium: Fenerbahçe Stadı; Attendance: 19,807; Referee: Ahmet Çakar

22 February 1995 2	Galatasaray SK	1–1	Fenerbahçe SK	Istanbul
20:00 EET	Suat Kaya 52'	(Report)	Aygün Taşkıran 22'	Stadium: Ali Sami Yen Stadı; Attendance: 28,033; Referee: Oğuz Sarvan

=== Final ===
5 April 1995 1	Galatasaray SK	2–3	Trabzonspor	Istanbul
19:00 EET	Sedat Balkanlı 66'; Tugay Kerimoğlu 84' (pen.)	(Report)	Hami Mandıralı 11', 88'; Shota Arveladze 60'	Stadium: Ali Sami Yen Stadı; Attendance: 27,827; Referee: Mustafa Çulcu

12 April 1995 2	Trabzonspor	1–0	Galatasaray SK	Trabzon
18:00 EET	Orhan Kaynak 16'	(Report)		Stadium: Hüseyin Avni Aker Stadium; Referee: Ayhan Yücebilgiç

== UEFA Champions League ==
=== Qualifying round ===
10 August 1994 1	FC Avenir Beggen (Luxembourg)	1–5	(Turkey) Galatasaray SK	Luxembourg City
	Mikhail Zaritski 50'	(Report)	Kubilay Türkyılmaz 30'; Saffet Sancaklı 35'; Hakan Şükür 69'; Arif Erdem 76', 89'	Stadium: Stade Josy Barthel; Referee: Kenny Clark (Scotland)

22 August 1994 2	Galatasaray SK (Turkey)	4–0	(Luxembourg) FC Avenir Beggen	İzmir
	Hakan Şükür 52', 64', 83' (pen.); Saffet Sancaklı 64'	(Report)		Stadium: İzmir Atatürk Stadium; Attendance: 61,810; Referee: Dimitar Ivanov Momirov (Bulgaria)

=== Group stage ===
Pos	Team	Pld	W	D	L	GF	GA	GD	Pts	Qualification
1	(Sweden) IFK Göteborg	6	4	1	1	10	7	+3	9	Advance to knockout stage
2	(Spain) Barcelona	6	2	2	2	11	8	+3	6	Advance to knockout stage
3	(England) Manchester United	6	2	2	2	11	11	0	6	
4	(Turkey) Galatasaray	6	1	1	4	3	9	−6	3	

Source: UEFA

14 September 1994 1	FC Barcelona (Spain)	2–1	(Turkey) Galatasaray SK	Barcelona
	Ronald Koeman 30'; Guillermo Amor 50'	(Report)	Kubilay Türkyılmaz 14'	Stadium: Camp Nou; Attendance: 77,000; Referee: Piero Ceccarini (Italy)

28 September 1994 2	Galatasaray SK (Turkey)	0–0	(England) Manchester United FC	Istanbul
		(Report)		Stadium: Ali Sami Yen Stadı; Attendance: 28,605; Referee: Mario van der Ende (Netherlands)

19 October 1994 3	IFK Göteborg (Sweden)	1–0	(Turkey) Galatasaray SK	Gothenburg
		(Report)		Stadium: Ullevi; Attendance: 26,000; Referee: Gerd Grabher (Austria)

2 November 1994 4	Galatasaray SK (Turkey)	0–1	(Sweden) IFK Göteborg	Istanbul
		(Report)	Magnus Erlingmark 86'	Stadium: Ali Sami Yen Stadı; Attendance: 27,300; Referee: Vaclav Krondl (Czech Republic)

23 November 1994 5	Galatasaray SK (Turkey)	2–1	(Spain) FC Barcelona	Istanbul
	Hakan Şükür 72' (pen.); Arif Erdem 88'	(Report)	Romário 16'	Stadium: Ali Sami Yen Stadı; Attendance: 18,375; Referee: Vadim Zhuk (Belarus)

7 December 1994 6	Manchester United FC (England)	4–0	(Turkey) Galatasaray SK	Manchester
	Simon Davies 2'; David Beckham 37'; Roy Keane 48'; Bülent Korkmaz 87' (o.g.)	(Report)		Stadium: Old Trafford; Attendance: 39,220; Referee: Ryszard Wójcik (Poland)

== Başbakanlık Kupası ==
Kick-off listed in local time (EET)

22 May 1995 1	Fenerbahçe SK	1–1	Galatasaray SK	Ankara
19:00 EET	Kemalettin Şentürk 115'	(Report)	Kubilay Türkyılmaz 93'	Stadium: 19 Mayıs Stadı; Referee: Oğuz Sarvan

== Friendly Matches ==
Kick-off listed in local time (EET)

=== TSYD Kupası ===
3 August 1994 1	Fenerbahçe SK	4–3	Galatasaray SK	Istanbul
20:00 EET	Bülent Uygun 30', 48'; İlker Yağcıoğlu 77'; Mecnur Çolak 83'	(Report)	Sedat Balkanlı 36'; Suat Kaya 71'; Arif Erdem 75'	Stadium: Fenerbahçe Stadı; Attendance: 19,620; Referee: Serdar Çakır

5 August 1994 2	Galatasaray SK	4–2	Beşiktaş JK	Istanbul
20:00 EET	Saffet Sancaklı 41', 65', 90'; Yusuf Tepekule 45'	(Report)	Ertuğrul Sağlam 43'; Bülent Korkmaz 85' (o.g.)	Stadium: İnönü Stadı; Attendance: 11,424; Referee: Ahmet Çakar

=== Türkiye Mehmetçikle El Ele Turnuvası ===
22 April 1995 1	Fenerbahçe SK	1–1	Galatasaray SK	Istanbul
14:00 EET	Feyyaz Uçar 12'	(Report)	Saffet Sancaklı 59'	Stadium: Fenerbahçe Stadı; Referee: Serdar Çakır

== Attendance ==
Competition	Av. Att.	Total Att.
1. Lig	22,725	386,328
Türkiye Kupası	24,646	73,938
Champions League	34,023	136,090
Total	24,848	596,356
