= 1998–99 Turkish Cup =

Türkiye Kupası

Tournament details
- Country: Turkey
- Teams: 90

Final positions
- Champions: Galatasaray
- Runners-up: Beşiktaş

Tournament statistics
- Matches played: 105
- Goals scored: 362 (3.45 per match)
- Top goal scorer(s): Ertuğrul Sağlam; Mohamed El Badraoui (5 goals each)

The 1998–99 Turkish Cup was the 37th edition of the tournament that determined the association football Süper Lig Turkish Cup (Turkish: Türkiye Kupası) champion under the auspices of the Turkish Football Federation (Turkish: Türkiye Futbol Federasyonu; TFF). champion under the auspices of the Turkish Football Federation (Turkish: Türkiye Futbol Federasyonu; TFF). Galatasaray successfully contested Beşiktaş on both legs of the finals. The results of the tournament also determined which clubs would be promoted or relegated.

== First round ==
Team 1	Score	Team 2
Çarşamba Belediyespor	1–1 (1–4 p)	Ünyespor
Melikgazi Belediyesi Erciyesspor	0–0 (3–4 p)	Kocasinan Belediyespor
Kahramanmaraşspor	1–0	Nevşehirspor
MKE Kırıkkalespor	3–2	Egospor
Bilecikspor	1–0	Çubukspor
Uşakspor	2–0	Kütahyaspor
Aliağa Belediyespor	2–0	Balıkesirspor
Gönenspor	1–2	Gebzespor
Tepecik Fıratpenspor	2–1	Çanspor
İnegölspor	2–1	Sapancaspor
Bingölspor	4–0	Silopi Belediyespor

== Second round ==
Team 1	Score	Team 2
Diyarbakırspor	8–2	Bingölspor
Vanspor	3–0	Batman Petrolspor
Ağrıspor	w/o	Mardinspor
Giresunspor	1–3	Çaykur Rizespor
Gümüşhane Doğanspor	2–1	Erzincanspor
Artvin Hopaspor	5–1	Orduspor
Adıyamanspor	1–0	Kahramanmaraşspor
Şanlıurfaspor	4–1	Malatyaspor
Fırat Üniversitesi	1–2	Elazığspor
MKE Kırıkkalespor	1–1 (4–1 p)	Yimpaş Yozgatspor
Ünyespor	2–1	Amasyaspor
Kayserispor	2–1	Sankospor
Adana Demirspor	3–1	Kocasinan Belediyespor
Mersin İdman Yurdu	3–4	Hatayspor
Eskişehirspor	3–2	Konyaspor
Petrol Ofisi	1–0	Şekerspor
Ankara Demirspor	1–5 (aet)	B.B. Ankaraspor
Kuşadasıspor	1–4	Uşakspor
Marmarisspor	1–5	Denizlispor
Aydınspor	2–0	Bucaspor
Yeni Salihlispor	3–2 (aet)	Karşıyaka
İzmirspor	1–2	Göztepe
Aliağa Belediyespor	2–0	Soma Linyitspor
İstanbul B.B.	5–2	Pendikspor
Çorluspor	2–1	Edirnespor
Tepecik Fıratpenspor	0–1	Zeytinburnuspor
Gebzespor	4–5	Kartalspor
Kasımpaşa	2–1	İnegölspor
Bakırköyspor	1–1 (2–4 p)	Sarıyer
Zonguldakspor	1–2	Bilecikspor
Kilimli Belediyespor	4–1 (aet)	Boluspor

== Third round ==
Team 1	Score	Team 2
Şanlıurfaspor	3–0	Elazığspor
Vanspor	1–0	Ağrıspor
Çaykur Rizespor	2–1	Ünyespor
Artvin Hopaspor	4–4 (5–4 p)	Gümüşhane Doğanspor
Adıyamanspor	1–3	Kayserispor
Hatayspor	0–1	Adana Demirspor
MKE Kırıkkalespor	2–1	Bilecikspor
Kilimli Belediyespor	1–0	Petrol Ofisi
B.B. Ankaraspor	2–1	Eskişehirspor
Uşakspor	0–0 (4-3 p)	Aydınspor
Aliağa Belediyespor	2–5 (aet)	Göztepe
Yeni Salihlispor	2–1	Denizlispor
Kasımpaşa	3–6	Çorluspor
İstanbul B.B.	3–0	Zeytinburnuspor
Sarıyer	5–2	Kartalspor

== Fourth round ==
Team 1	Score	Team 2
Çaykur Rizespor	1–2 (aet)	Artvin Hopaspor
Vanspor	0–1	Erzurumspor
Adanaspor	7–1	Diyarbakırspor
Kayserispor	3–1	B.B. Ankaraspor
MKE Kırıkkalespor	2–0	Kilimli Belediyespor
Çorluspor	1–0	Sarıyer
Sakaryaspor	2–1	İstanbul B.B.
Göztepe	0–2	Uşakspor
Adana Demirspor	3–1	Şanlıurfaspor

== Fifth round ==
Team 1	Score	Team 2
Çorluspor	2–1	MKE Kırıkkalespor
Adanaspor	3–1	Adana Demirspor
Kayserispor	2–3	Ankaragücü
Gençlerbirliği	2–1	Artvin Hopaspor
Kocaelispor	3–2	Antalyaspor
Uşakspor	0–2 (aet)	Sakaryaspor
Çanakkale Dardanelspor	0–2	Erzurumspor
Yeni Salihlispor	0–2	Gaziantepspor

== Sixth round ==
Team 1	Agg.	Team 2	1st leg	2nd leg
Altay	4–4 (a)	Sakaryaspor	1–4	3–0
Ankaragücü	3–1	Bursaspor	3–1	0–0
Çorluspor	1–14	Beşiktaş	1–4	0–10
İstanbulspor	5–2	Gençlerbirliği	3–0	2–2
Kocaelispor	5–2	Kardemir D.Ç. Karabükspor	1–1	4–1
Samsunspor	4–4 (a)	Erzurumspor	3–2	1–2
Adanaspor	1–6	Galatasaray	0–2	1–4
Trabzonspor	6–7	Gaziantepspor	5–4	1–3

== Quarter-finals ==
Team 1	Agg.	Team 2	1st leg	2nd leg
Gaziantepspor	1–2	Ankaragücü	1–0	0–2
Kocaelispor	1–2	Beşiktaş	1–2	0–0
Erzurumspor	2–3	Sakaryaspor	2–1	0–2
İstanbulspor	2–3	Galatasaray	0–0	2–3

== Semi-finals ==
=== Summary table ===
Team 1	Agg.	Team 2	1st leg	2nd leg
Sakaryaspor	2–3	Galatasaray	2–1	0–2
Ankaragücü	0–3	Beşiktaş	0–1	0–2

=== 1st leg ===
17 February 1999 Semi-final	Sakaryaspor	2–1	Galatasaray	Adapazarı
13:00 EET (UTC+02)	Hüseyin 10'; Mehmet 83'		Emre 71'	Stadium: Sakarya Atatürk Stadium; Referee: Murat Ilgaz

17 February 1999 Semi-final	Ankaragücü	0–1	Beşiktaş	Ankara
18:00 EET (UTC+02)			Oktay 69'	Stadium: Ankara 19 Mayıs Stadium; Referee: Ayhan Yücebilgiç

=== 2nd leg ===
10 March 1999 Semi-final	Galatasaray	2–0	Sakaryaspor	Istanbul
19:00 EET (UTC+02)	Arif 24'; Ümit 64'			Stadium: Ali Sami Yen Stadium; Referee: İbrahim Aksoy

11 March 1999 Semi-final	Beşiktaş	2–0	Ankaragücü	Istanbul
20:00 EET (UTC+02)	Yasin 47'; Ertuğrul 62'			Stadium: BJK İnönü Stadium; Referee: Sadık İlhan

== UEFA Cup playoff ==
It is a one-legged match between the teams of Ankaragücü and Sakaryaspor, who were eliminated in the semi-finals, for the third place. The third place match was played on 3 June 1999. Despite the fact that there was no match under the name of the third place match in the Turkish Cup before, an extra match to be played to determine the team that will participate in the UEFA Cup from the Turkish Cup, since the two teams that reached the final this season have qualified for the UEFA Champions League by taking the first two places in the league. was needed. This match was played in the play-off style on a neutral ground at a later date than the final match. After this year, the status was changed and in the event of the same situation, the team that came first after the teams that participated in the Champions League was given the right to participate in the UEFA Cup.

3 June 1999 UEFA Cup playoff	Ankaragücü	5–0	Sakaryaspor	İzmir
20:00 EEST (UTC+03)	Tarık 2', 21', 25'; Hakan K. 16'; Ramazan 88'			Stadium: İzmir Atatürk Stadium; Referee: Oğuz Sarvan

== Final ==
=== 1st leg ===
14 April 1999 Final	Galatasaray	0–0	Beşiktaş	Istanbul, Turkey
19:00 EEST (UTC+03)				Stadium: Ali Sami Yen Stadium; Attendance: 14,513; Referee: Muhittin Boşat

=== 2nd leg ===
5 May 1999 Final	Beşiktaş	0–2	Galatasaray	Istanbul, Turkey
20:00 EEST (UTC+03)			Ümit 52', 68'	Stadium: BJK İnönü Stadium; Referee: Oğuz Sarvan

== Miscellaneous ==
On the way to the cup final, Galatasaray footballer Hasan Şaş tested positive for doping during the semi-final matches and also provided an assist, for which he was later handed a six-month ban for doping and missed the cup final. Furthermore, Galatasaray’s team doctor was held partly responsible for the doping case and banned for one year.

== See also ==
- 1998–99 1.Lig
