= Okan Buruk =

Turkish football manager (born 1973)

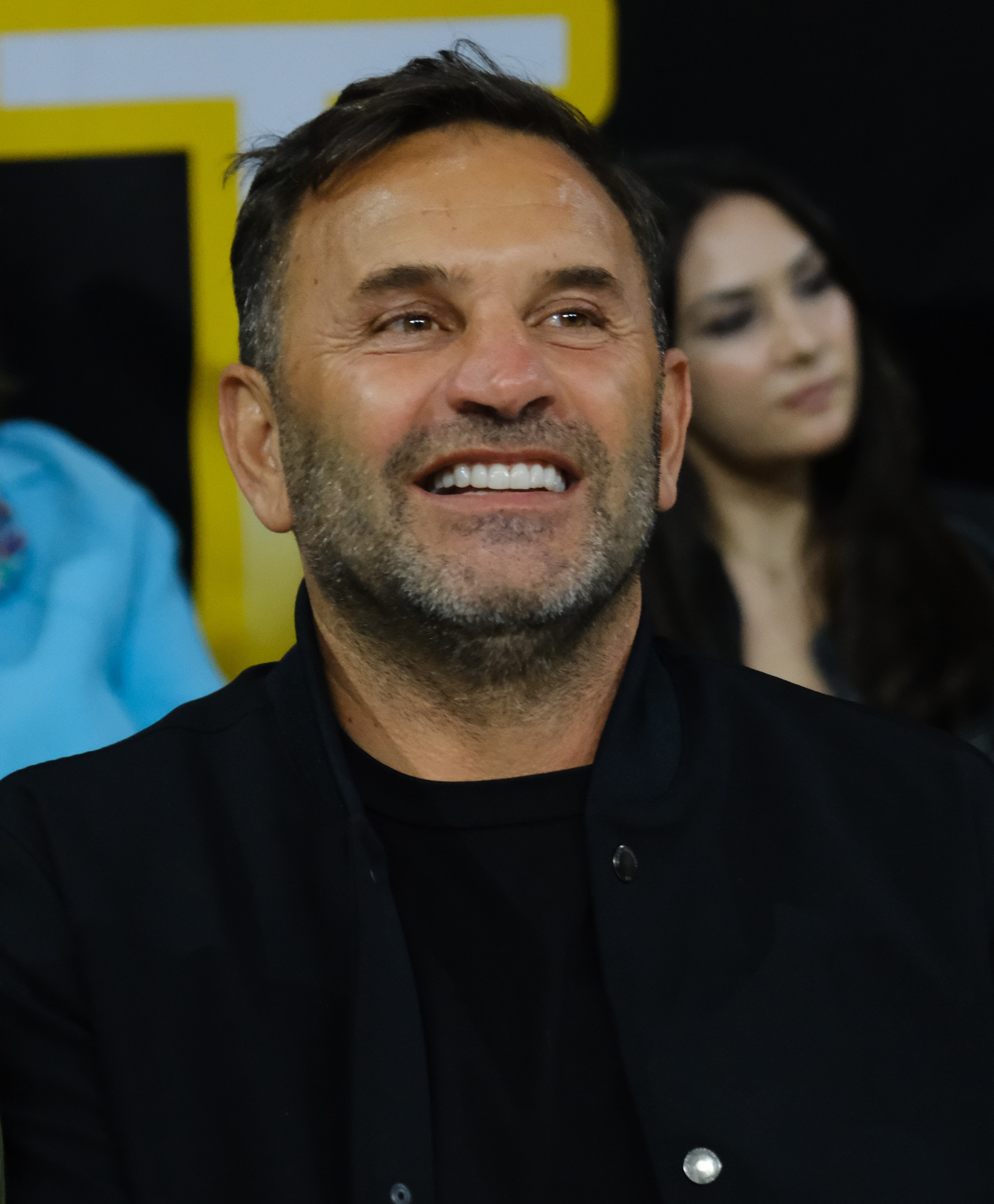
- Buruk in 2025

Personal information
- Date of birth: 19 October 1973 (age 53)
- Place of birth: Istanbul, Turkey
- Height: 1.69 m (5 ft 7 in)
- Position: Midfielder

Team information
- Current team: Galatasaray (manager)

Youth career
- 1984–1991: Galatasaray

Senior career*
Years	Team	Apps	(Gls)
1991–2001	Galatasaray	189	(33)
2001–2004	Inter Milan	24	(2)
2004–2006	Beşiktaş	43	(1)
2006–2008	Galatasaray	19	(2)
2008–2010	İstanbul Başakşehir	28	(0)
Total		304	(38)

International career
1989–1990	Turkey U16	5	(0)
1990–1992	Turkey U18	28	(4)
1992–1995	Turkey U21	13	(1)
1992–2010	Turkey	56	(8)

Managerial career
- 2013–2014: Elazığspor
- 2014–2015: Gaziantepspor
- 2015–2016: Sivasspor
- 2016–2017: Göztepe
- 2017–2018: Akhisarspor
- 2018–2019: Çaykur Rizespor
- 2019–2021: İstanbul Başakşehir
- 2022–: Galatasaray
Medal record
Representing Turkey
Men's football
FIFA World Cup
Third place	2002 Korea/Japan
- * Club domestic league appearances and goals

Okan Buruk (Turkish pronunciation: [[oˈkan buɾuk]], born 19 October 1973) is a Turkish professional football manager and former player who is the manager of Süper Lig club Galatasaray. With seven Super League titles as a player and five more as a manager, he holds the record for the most championships in the league's history.

As a midfielder, Buruk enjoyed a successful playing career spanning nearly two decades. He played for prominent clubs, including Galatasaray, Inter Milan, Beşiktaş, and İstanbul Başakşehir. During his time at Galatasaray, he won six Süper Lig titles, four Turkish Cups, and was an instrumental part of the squad that won the 1999–2000 UEFA Cup, making Galatasaray the first Turkish team to achieve this milestone. He was also named Man of the Match in Galatasaray's 2–1 victory over Real Madrid in the 2000 UEFA Super Cup.

Internationally, Buruk earned 56 caps for the Turkey national team. He represented Turkey at UEFA Euro 2000 and was in the squad that won the bronze medal at the 2002 FIFA World Cup, the nation's best-ever finish in the tournament.

As a manager, Buruk achieved notable success. He guided Istanbul Başakşehir to their first-ever Süper Lig title in the 2019–20 Süper Lig season, becoming only the second manager to achieve this without leading a Big 4 (Beşiktaş, Galatasaray, Fenerbahçe, Trabzonspor) team. His managerial success continued with Galatasaray, where he led the team to four consecutive Süper Lig titles in the 2022–23, 2023–24, 2024–25 and 2025–26 seasons. Buruk is recognized for his high-tempo pressing football and his player-management skills.

== Club career ==
On 1 July 1992, Buruk began his professional football career with Galatasaray, where he played until 30 June 2001. During his nine-year tenure, he won six Süper Lig titles and played a pivotal role in Galatasaray's European successes. He was part of the team that won the 1999–2000 UEFA Cup, making Galatasaray the first Turkish club to achieve this milestone. On 25 August 2000, Okan was named Man of the Match in the 2000 UEFA Super Cup, where Galatasaray defeated Real Madrid 2–1.

In 2001, Buruk transferred to Inter Milan. On 26 August 2001, he made his Serie A debut in a match against Perugia, coming on as a substitute for Clarence Seedorf. On 21 October 2001, he provided an assist to Mohamed Kallon in the Milan Derby against AC Milan, although Inter lost 4–2. On 25 September 2002, he made his UEFA Champions League debut in a home victory against Ajax. He scored his first goal for Inter on 16 November 2002, in the 89th minute, securing a 2–2 draw in an away match against Roma. Okan played for Inter until 30 June 2004, he was known for his relentless energy and versatility in midfield.

On 21 October 2001, in the derby game against Fatih Terim's AC Milan, Okan made the assist to Mohamed Kallon where Inter lost their home game 4–2 against their rivals. Okan scored his first goal on the 89th minute helping his team to earn a 2–2 draw in an away game against Roma on 16 November 2002. Okan was a non-stop running player with energy; he mentioned that his former coach Hector Cuper yelled at him from the bench that he should stay at his position.

On 1 July 2004, Okan signed with Beşiktaş. During his two seasons with the club, he won the Turkish Cup on 3 May 2006, marking a significant achievement in his career. On 1 July 2006, Okan rejoined Galatasaray on a two-year contract. He was part of the squad that secured the 2007–08 Süper Lig title on 11 May 2008. However, after his contract expired on 30 June 2008, he departed from the club. On 1 July 2008, Okan signed a two-year deal with İstanbul Büyükşehir Belediyespor. He continued to play professionally until his retirement on 22 May 2010, after a friendly match against the Czech Republic in Leipzig.

== International career ==
Buruk's international career spanned nearly 18 years, during which he earned 56 caps and scored 8 goals for the Turkey national football team. He made his senior debut on 28 October 1992 in a World Cup qualifier against San Marino. Prior to his senior career, he was a prolific youth international, representing Turkey at the U16, U18, and U21 levels, including winning the 1992 UEFA European Under-18 Championship. At UEFA Euro 2000, Buruk secured a place in Turkish football history by scoring the nation's first-ever goal in a UEFA European Championship final tournament, netting a header to equalize in an eventual 2–1 group stage defeat to Italy. He was a key figure in the qualification campaign for the 2002 FIFA World Cup, notably scoring a hat-trick in a 2–0 and 3–0 aggregate period against Moldova. Although he was named in the final squad for the 2002 World Cup, where Turkey achieved a historic third-place finish, his participation was severely restricted by a persistent injury. His only appearance in the tournament came as a substitute in the 76th minute of the 3–2 victory over co-hosts South Korea in the third-place play-off. Buruk officially retired from international football in May 2010. His final appearance was a ceremonial farewell in a friendly match against the Czech Republic national football team held at the Red Bull Arena in the United States. He was substituted off in the 9th minute to a standing ovation, alongside veteran teammate Emre Aşık, marking the end of his tenure as a "Crescent-Star" player.

== Managerial career ==
=== Assistant of Turkey national team ===
Buruk, who served as Administrative Coordinator of the Turkey national team during the Guus Hiddink era, became assistant coach in November 2011 following Abdullah Avcı's appointment as head coach.

=== Elazığspor ===
In August 2013, after Abdullah Avcı resigned, Buruk left his position with the national team. On 30 October 2013, he signed a two-year contract with Elazığspor. Starting his managerial role in the 10th week of the league, this was Buruk's first managerial experience. However, after the team was relegated, he resigned on 2 June 2014.

=== Gaziantepspor ===
In the 2014–15 season, Buruk signed a three-year contract with Gaziantepspor. After finishing the season in mid-table, he terminated his contract by mutual agreement due to disagreements about the next season.

=== Sivasspor ===
On 26 October 2015, Buruk signed a one-year contract with Sivasspor after Sergen Yalçın vacated the managerial role. Starting in the 10th week, Buruk resigned after achieving 2 wins, 7 losses, and 2 draws in 11 matches.

=== Göztepe ===
On 1 June 2016, Buruk was appointed the head coach of Göztepe, a club competing in the TFF 1. Lig, Turkey's second-tier football league. He signed a three-year contract with the club, aiming to lead them back to the Süper Lig after a prolonged absence. During the 2016–17 season, Buruk managed the team for 33 matches, achieving 15 wins, 7 draws, and 11 losses, resulting in an average of 1.58 points per game. Despite a promising start, the team experienced a series of inconsistent performances, leading to a decline in form. Consequently, Buruk resigned from his position on 22 March 2017, prior to the season's conclusion. Following his departure, Göztepe went on to secure promotion to the Süper Lig via the playoffs at the end of the season.

=== Akhisarspor ===
On 28 March 2017, Buruk was appointed as the manager of Akhisarspor, signing a 1.5-year contract to succeed Tolunay Kafkas. At the time of his arrival, the club was embroiled in a relegation battle, sitting in 14th place and only one point above the drop zone. Buruk orchestrated an immediate turnaround, leading the team to seven victories in their final nine league matches of the 2016–17 season, ultimately securing a 7th-place finish. The 2017–18 season marked the most successful period in the club's history under Buruk's leadership. While maintaining a stable mid-table position in the Süper Lig, the team embarked on a historic run in the Turkish Cup. In the semi-finals, Akhisarspor achieved a major upset by eliminating Galatasaray; after losing the first leg 2–1 at home, Buruk's side secured a 3–1 victory at the Türk Telekom Stadium to advance on aggregate.

On 10 May 2018, Buruk guided Akhisarspor to their first-ever major trophy by defeating Fenerbahçe 3–2 in the final held in Diyarbakır. Goals from Miguel Lopes, Abdoul Sissoko, and Hélder Barbosa secured the title and earned the club direct qualification for the 2018–19 UEFA Europa League group stages. Despite these achievements, Buruk officially parted ways with the club on 14 June 2018. The departure followed a breakdown in negotiations regarding a contract extension; reports indicated that Buruk sought a significant salary increase and guarantees regarding the transfer budget for the upcoming European campaign, which the club's board declined to meet.

=== Rizespor ===
On 19 September 2018, Buruk was appointed the head coach of Çaykur Rizespor following the departure of İbrahim Üzülmez. Under his management, the team managed to avoid relegation in the 2018–19 Super League season, showcasing an impressive improvement in form during the second half of the season. On 28 May 2019, Buruk announced his departure from Çaykur Rizespor, citing personal reasons and expressing gratitude for his time at the club. In a heartfelt message shared via Instagram, Buruk thanked the club, players, and supporters for their trust and support, describing his decision to leave as difficult but necessary.

=== İstanbul Başakşehir ===
On 11 June 2019, Buruk was appointed head coach of İstanbul Başakşehir following the departure of Abdullah Avcı. In the 2019–20 season, Başakşehir adopted the slogan “New Vision, Same Goal.” After being eliminated by Olympiacos in the 2019–20 UEFA Champions League play-off, the team competed in the 2019–20 UEFA Europa League, where they were placed in Group J alongside Roma, Borussia Mönchengladbach, and Wolfsberger AC. Despite an initial 4–0 loss to Roma, Başakşehir topped the group with notable wins, including a 3–0 victory over Wolfsberg and a dramatic 2–1 away win against Borussia Mönchengladbach to secure first place.

In the Round of 32, Başakşehir faced Sporting CP. After losing the first leg 3–1 in Lisbon, Başakşehir mounted a surprising comeback in the second leg in Istanbul, defeating Sporting CP 4–1 after extra time, thanks to a last-minute goal by Edin Višća, to progress 5–4 on aggregate. This victory was seen as a remarkable achievement for the club in European competition.

In the Round of 16, Başakşehir played Copenhagen. They won the first leg 1–0 in Istanbul with a penalty goal from Edin Višća. However, due to the COVID-19 pandemic in Europe, all second-leg matches, originally scheduled for 19 March 2020, were postponed indefinitely. When the competition resumed in August, the second leg in Copenhagen saw Başakşehir lose 3–0, resulting in their elimination with a 3–1 aggregate defeat.

On 19 July 2020, Başakşehir were crowned champions of the Süper Lig for the first time in the club's history under Buruk's management. They became only the sixth club in the competition's history to win the league title and the fourth club from Istanbul to do so.

Following their domestic success, Başakşehir qualified directly for the group stage of the 2020–21 UEFA Champions League. They were placed in Group H alongside Paris Saint-Germain, RB Leipzig, and Manchester United. Despite finishing fourth in the group, Başakşehir secured a historic 2–1 home victory against Manchester United, with goals from Demba Ba and Edin Višća. This win marked a significant milestone for the club.

Buruk mutually terminated his contract with Başakşehir on 29 January 2021, during the 2020–21 season, after a challenging campaign.

=== Galatasaray ===
==== 2022–23 season ====
On 22 June 2022, Buruk returned to Galatasaray, this time as head coach. He signed a two-year contract with an additional option for one more year. In his debut season, Buruk guided Galatasaray to a record-breaking 14 consecutive league wins, the longest winning streak in the club's history. Under his management, the team showcased dominant performances throughout the season, highlighted by derby victories and consistent defensive solidity. Galatasaray secured the 2022–23 Super League title two weeks before the end of the season, marking Buruk's second league championship as a manager and the club's 23rd overall. The team also finished the season with the best attacking and defensive records, scoring 83 goals and conceding just 27 across 36 matches.

Additionally, Buruk's tactical approach was praised for reviving the team's attacking identity and incorporating young talents into the squad. His success in his first season set the foundation for Galatasaray's ambitions to compete both domestically and in European competitions.

==== 2023–24 season ====
In the 2023–24 season, Galatasaray qualified for the group stage of the UEFA Champions League by progressing through three preliminary rounds. However, Galatasaray competed in the UEFA Champions League and finished third in Group A, which included Bayern Munich, Copenhagen, and Manchester United. Highlights included a dramatic 3–2 victory over Manchester United at Old Trafford and a thrilling 3–3 draw in Istanbul. Their group stage performance secured them a place in the UEFA Europa League knockout round play-offs.

In the Europa League, Galatasaray faced Sparta Prague in the knockout round play-offs. Despite winning the first leg 3–2 at home, they suffered a 4–1 defeat in the second leg, resulting in a 6–4 aggregate loss and elimination. and moved to the UEFA Europa League, where their European journey ended in the round of 16 playoffs.

In December 2023, the Turkish Super Cup final between Galatasaray and Fenerbahçe, scheduled in Riyadh, Saudi Arabia, was canceled due to a dispute over the display of slogans and imagery related to Mustafa Kemal Atatürk, the founder of modern Turkey. Both teams intended to honor Atatürk with specific banners and T-shirts considering the timing of the match, which was the centennial of the Turkish Republic, but Saudi authorities prohibited these displays, leading the clubs to refuse participation and the match was rescheduled to April.

On 12 April 2024, Galatasaray finally faced their arch-rivals Fenerbahçe in Şanlıurfa for the 2023 Turkish Super Cup final. However, Fenerbahçe had fielded their Under-19 team as a form of protest of Turkish Football Federation, citing "unjust treatment". Just 50 seconds into the game, Galatasaray's Mauro Icardi scored, putting his team ahead 1–0. Following this early goal, Fenerbahçe's young players, acting on instructions from their technical staff, left the field, leading to the match being abandoned. As a result, the match was awarded to Galatasaray with a default 3–0 victory, and they were crowned Turkish Super Cup champions.

In the highly anticipated derby match against Fenerbahçe during the 37th week, Galatasaray had the opportunity to secure the league title. However, the team suffered a disappointing 1–0 defeat in front of their home crowd at the Rams Park. This loss delayed their chance to celebrate the championship and added pressure going into the final matchday.

Despite the setback, Galatasaray bounced back in the final week of the season with a dominant 3–1 away victory against Konyaspor on 26 May 2024. With this win, the team clinched the 2023–24 Süper Lig title, their second consecutive league championship under Buruk. This victory also marked Galatasaray's record-breaking 24th Süper Lig title, solidifying their status as Turkey's most successful club in the league. During the season, Galatasaray and Okan Buruk broke several league, club and personal records, including the most points won in a season (102) and most consecutive wins in a season (17).

==== 2024–25 season ====
On 7 June 2024, ahead of the 2024–25 season season Buruk signed a new two-year contract with Galatasaray, extending his tenure with the club. On 3 August 2024, Galatasaray faced their rivals Beşiktaş in the 2024 Turkish Super Cup final. Despite entering the match as favorites, Galatasaray suffered a heavy 5–0 defeat at the Atatürk Olympic Stadium in Istanbul. This result marked one of the club's most significant losses in a domestic final. Just weeks later, Galatasaray's bid to qualify for the 2024–25 UEFA Champions League group stage ended in disappointment when they faced Young Boys in the play-off round. In the first leg on 21 August 2024, Galatasaray suffered a 3–2 defeat. In the second leg on 27 August 2024, Galatasaray lost 1–0 at the Rams Park in Istanbul and were eliminated on a 4–2 aggregate.

Despite early criticism following their heavy defeat to Beşiktaş and elimination from the Champions League, Galatasaray remained focused on their domestic campaign under Buruk. The setbacks served as motivation for the team to recover in the ongoing Süper Lig season.

On 21 September 2024, Galatasaray faced arch-rivals Fenerbahçe in the first derby of the 2024–25 season at the Şükrü Saracoğlu Stadium in Istanbul. This match also marked the first derby for Fenerbahçe's new manager, José Mourinho. Galatasaray delivered a commanding performance, defeating Fenerbahçe 3–1 in front of 44,514 spectators. Despite a challenging start to the 2024–25 season, Galatasaray ended the first half on a high note, particularly with their strong performances in the Europa League league phase. Domestically, they bounced back with consistent performances, including a record-breaking streak of 15 consecutive away wins, continuing into the 2024–25 season. In the second half of the season, Galatasaray suffered setbacks including the elimination from Europe League and the 0–0 home draw against title rivals Fenerbahçe, although they continue to lead the race with a six-point advantage.

On 2 April 2025, Buruk's nose was grabbed by Mourinho after Fenerbahçe lost 2–1 in the quarter-final at Şükrü Saracoğlu Stadium in Istanbul. Despite losing their unbeaten streak in the Süper Lig following a defeat to Beşiktaş, Galatasaray responded strongly with a series of successful results and maintained their position at the top of the standings. On 14 May 2025, they defeated Trabzonspor 3–0 in the final of the Turkish Cup, securing the cup. Just days later, on 18 May 2025, Galatasaray clinched the Süper Lig title with a victory against Kayserispor, securing the championship with two matches to spare. With this triumph, Galatasaray were crowned Süper Lig champions for the third consecutive season.

==== 2025–26 season ====
Buruk entered the 2025–26 season following Galatasaray's third consecutive league title. In July 2025, the club completed the permanent signing of Victor Osimhen for a Turkish record fee of €75 million, a move heavily advocated for by Buruk to strengthen the squad for European competition. Domestically, Galatasaray maintained their position at the top of the Süper Lig standings throughout the first half of the campaign. In December 2025, Mauro Icardi surpassed Gheorghe Hagi's record for the most league goals scored by a foreign player in the club's history during a match against Kasımpaşa.

In the 2025–26 UEFA Champions League league phase, Buruk's side achieved several landmark results that underscored the club's resurgence on the continental stage. Galatasaray recorded a 1–0 victory over Liverpool at the Ali Sami Yen Spor Kompleksi, a match characterized by Buruk's high-pressing system, and secured a dominant 3–0 away win against AFC Ajax at the Johan Cruyff Arena. However, the campaign also featured a narrow 1–0 home loss to Union Saint-Gilloise and a hard-fought 1–1 draw against Atlético Madrid at the Rams Park. Buruk led Galatasaray to the Round of 16 for the first time since the 2013–14 season. In February 2026, the team eliminated Juventus in the knockout play-off round with a 7–5 aggregate score. After securing a 5–2 victory in the first leg at the Rams Park, Galatasaray progressed despite a 3–2 loss in extra time during the return leg in Turin on 25 February. Despite reports in late 2025 suggesting a contract extension until 2028 was imminent, President Dursun Özbek stated on 20 February 2026 that the club would evaluate Buruk's future at the end of the season, as his current deal was set to expire in June.

== Personal life ==
He is originally from Akçaabat, Trabzon. He married model and former Miss Turkey and Top Model of the World 2003 winner Nihan Akkuş on 3 July 2007 and they had a son Ali Yiğit, in 2009. Their marriage ended in February 2024. But after a short time the couple got back together. His brother, Fuat, was also a professional footballer and is currently a coach.

== Playing statistics ==
=== Club ===
Appearances and goals by club, season and competition
Club	Season	League			National cup (Note: Includes Turkish Cup, Coppa Italia)		Europe		Other		Total	
Club	Season	Division	Apps	Goals	Apps	Goals	Apps	Goals	Apps	Goals	Apps	Goals
Galatasaray	1991–92	1. Lig	1	2	0	0	—		—		1	2
Galatasaray	1992–93	1. Lig	15	0	1	0	5 (Note: Appearances in UEFA Cup)	0	—		21	0
Galatasaray	1993–94	1. Lig	2	0	0	0	2 (Note: Appearances in UEFA Champions League)	0	0	0	4	0
Galatasaray	1994–95	1. Lig	20	0	5	1	2	0	—		27	1
Galatasaray	1995–96	1. Lig	28	1	3	0	2	0	—		33	1
Galatasaray	1996–97	1. Lig	16	3	1	0	3 (Note: Appearances in UEFA Cup Winners' Cup)	0	1 (Note: Appearance in Turkish Super Cup)	0	21	3
Galatasaray	1997–98	1. Lig	24	5	8	1	2	0	1	0	35	6
Galatasaray	1998–99	1. Lig	28	11	6	0	8	1	–		42	12
Galatasaray	1999–2000	1. Lig	28	8	5	1	15 (Note: Eight appearances and two goals in UEFA Champions League, seven appearances and one goal in UEFA Cup)	3	–		48	12
Galatasaray	2000–01	1. Lig	26	2	3	0	13	0	1 (Note: Appearance in UEFA Super Cup)	0	43	2
Galatasaray	Total		188	32	31	3	52	4	3	0	274	39
Inter Milan	2001–02	Serie A	7	0	1	0	3	0	–		11	0
Inter Milan	2002–03	Serie A	15	2	0	0	7	0	–		22	2
Inter Milan	2003–04	Serie A	3	0	2	0	4	0	–		9	0
Inter Milan	Total		24	2	3	0	14	0	–		41	2
Beşiktaş	2004–05	Süper Lig	22	0	0	0	4	2	–		26	2
Beşiktaş	2005–06	Süper Lig	21	1	3	0	5	1	–		29	2
Beşiktaş	Total		43	1	3	0	9	3	–		55	4
Galatasaray	2006–07	Süper Lig	15	1	4	0	3	1	–		22	2
Galatasaray	2007–08	Süper Lig	4	1	2	0	2	0	–		8	1
Galatasaray	Total		19	2	6	0	5	1	–		30	3
İstanbul BB	2008–09	Süper Lig	17	0	1	0	—		—		18	0
İstanbul BB	2009–10	Süper Lig	11	0	2	0	—		—		13	0
İstanbul BB	Total		28	0	3	0	—		—		31	0
Career total			302	37	44	3	80	8	3	0	431	48

=== International ===
Appearances and goals by national team and year
National team	Year	Apps	Goals
Turkey	1992	1	0
Turkey	1998	3	0
Turkey	1999	5	0
Turkey	2000	8	2
Turkey	2001	9	2
Turkey	2002	7	2
Turkey	2003	9	1
Turkey	2004	9	0
Turkey	2005	4	1
Turkey	2010	1	0
Total		56	8

== Managerial statistics ==
As of match played 21 November 2026

Team	From	To	Record				
Team	From	To	G	W	D	L	Win %
Elazığspor	30 October 2013	2 June 2014	33	11	6	16	33.33
Gaziantepspor	1 August 2014	10 June 2015	42	15	9	18	35.71
Sivasspor	27 October 2015	8 February 2016	11	2	2	7	18.18
Göztepe	1 August 2016	22 March 2017	32	14	7	11	43.75
Akhisarspor	28 March 2017	30 June 2018	54	24	11	19	44.44
Çaykur Rizespor	24 September 2018	29 May 2019	32	11	12	9	34.38
İstanbul Başakşehir	11 June 2019	29 January 2021	79	36	18	25	45.57
Galatasaray	23 June 2022	present	221	158	29	34	71.49
Total			505	272	94	139	53.86

=== Turkish Super Lig statistics with Galatasaray ===
As of 7 November 2026

Team	From	To	Record				
Team	From	To	G	W	D	L	Win %
Galatasaray	2022	2023	36	28	4	4	77.78
Galatasaray	2023	2024	38	33	3	2	86.84
Galatasaray	2024	2025	36	30	5	1	83.33
Galatasaray	2025	2026	34	24	5	5	70.59
Galatasaray	2026	2027	12	10	1	1	83.33
Total			156	125	18	13	80.13

== Honours ==
=== Player ===
Galatasaray

- UEFA Cup: 1999–2000
- UEFA Super Cup: 2000
- Süper Lig: 1992–93, 1993–94, 1996–97, 1997–98, 1998–99, 1999–2000, 2007–08
- Turkish Cup: 1992–93, 1995–96, 1998–99, 1999–2000
- Turkish Super Cup: 1993, 1996, 1997

Beşiktaş

- Turkish Cup: 2005–06

Turkey

- FIFA World Cup third place: 2002

Individual

- 2000 UEFA Super Cup: Man of the Match

Order

- Turkish State Medal of Distinguished Service

=== Manager ===
Akhisarspor

- Turkish Cup: 2017–18

İstanbul Başakşehir

- Süper Lig: 2019–20

Galatasaray

- Süper Lig: 2022–23, 2023–24, 2024–25, 2025–26
- Turkish Cup: 2024–25
- Turkish Super Cup: 2023
