= Fuat Buruk =

Turkish football assistant manager

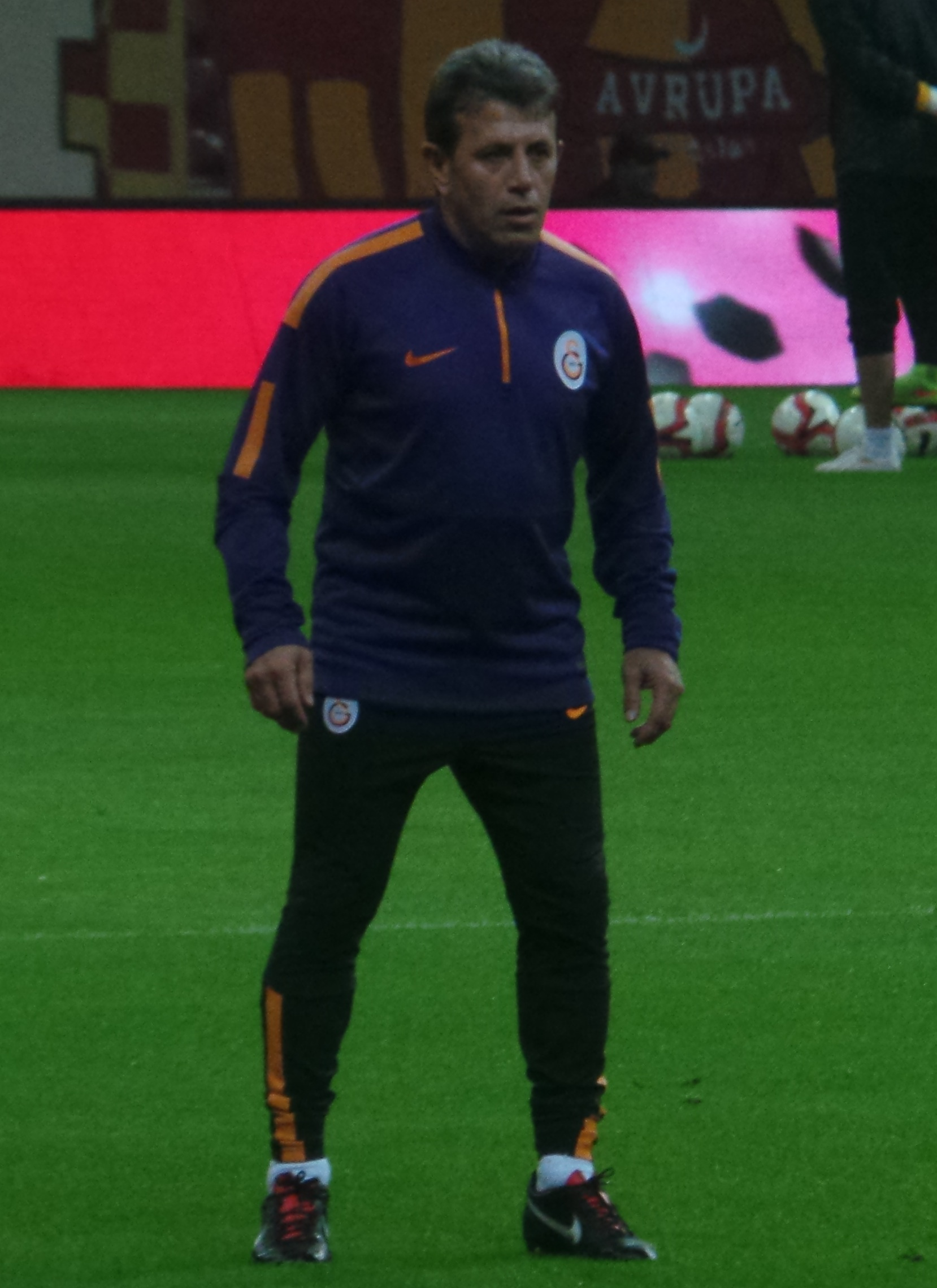

Personal information
- Full name: Fuat Nihat Buruk
- Date of birth: February 23, 1965 (age 61)
- Place of birth: Istanbul, Turkey
- Height: 1.65 m (5 ft 5 in)
- Position: Midfielder

Senior career*
Years	Team	Apps	(Gls)
1984–1988	Kütahyaspor	20	(6)
1988–1990	Konyaspor	61	(4)
1990–1994	Bakırköyspor	117	(8)
1994–2002	İstanbulspor A.Ş.	121	(1)
1998–1999	→ Adanaspor (loan)	27	(0)
2002–2003	İstanbul Kartal Belediyespor	6	(1)

International career^{‡}
1991–2002	Turkey	12	(3)

Managerial career
- 2004–2005: İstanbulspor A.Ş. (assistant manager)
- 2007–2008: Çaykur Rizespor (assistant manager)
- 2008–2009: Yeni Malatyaspor (assistant manager)
- 2009–2010: Eyüpspor (assistant manager)
- 2010–2011: Denizlispor (assistant manager)
- 2011–2014: Akhisar Belediyespor (assistant manager)
- 2014–2015: Galatasaray (assistant manager)
- 2015–2017: Bursaspor (assistant manager)
- 2017–: Osmanlıspor (assistant manager)
Medal record
Representing Turkey
Men's football
FIFA World Cup
Third place	2002 Japan–South Korea
- * Club domestic league appearances and goals as of 9 November 2017 ‡ National team caps and goals as of 9 November 2017

Fuat Buruk (born 23 February 1965 in Istanbul) is a Turkish football assistant manager for Osmanlıspor, and retired footballer who played as a midfielder for Konyaspor, Bakırköyspor, İstanbulspor A.Ş. in the Turkish Süper Lig.

== Professional career ==
Fuat spent his career in the top divisions of Turkey. After his long tenure with İstanbulspor A.Ş., Fuat returned to coach the youth team, and since then has been an assistant manager for various Süper Lig clubs. He has consistently been the assistant manager of Hamza Hamzaoğlu since 2008, where they were part of the management team of Yeni Malatyaspor.

== Personal life ==
Fuat is the brother of the footballer Okan Buruk.
