= Üstündağ =

Üstündağ is a Turkish surname meaning "superior mountain". Notable people with the surname include:

- Efe Üstündağ (born 1977), Turkish tennis player
- Cem Üstündag (born 2001), Austrian footballer
- Mustafa Üstündağ (actor) (born 1977), Turkish actor
- Mustafa Üstündağ (politician) (1933–1983), Turkish politician
- Nida Eliz Üstündağ (born 1996), Turkish swimmer
- Orhan Üstündağ (born 1967), Turkish footballer
- Taner Üstündağ (born 1971), Turkish alpine skier
