= 1994–95 1.Lig =

37th season of top-tier Turkish football

1.Lig
- Season: 1994–95
- Champions: Beşiktaş; 11th title
- Relegated: Zeytinburnuspor; Petrol Ofisi; Adana Demirspor
- Champions League: Beşiktaş
- Cup Winners' Cup: Trabzonspor
- UEFA Cup: Galatasaray; Fenerbahçe
- Intertoto Cup: Gençlerbirliği; Bursaspor
- Matches played: 306
- Goals scored: 945 (3.09 per match)
- Top goalscorer: Aykut Kocaman (27 goals)

The following are the statistics of the Turkish First Football League in season 1994/1995.

== Overview ==
It was contested by 18 teams, and Beşiktaş J.K. won the championship.

== League table ==
Pos	Team	Pld	W	D	L	GF	GA	GD	Pts	Qualification or relegation
1	Beşiktaş (C)	34	24	7	3	80	26	+54	79	Qualification to Champions League qualifying round
2	Trabzonspor	34	23	7	4	80	28	+52	76	Qualification to Cup Winners' Cup first round
3	Galatasaray	34	21	6	7	76	38	+38	69	Qualification to UEFA Cup preliminary round
4	Fenerbahçe	34	20	7	7	78	35	+43	67	Qualification to UEFA Cup preliminary round
5	Gençlerbirliği	34	17	8	9	61	45	+16	59	Qualification to Intertoto Cup group stage
6	Bursaspor	34	13	12	9	47	39	+8	51	Qualification to Intertoto Cup group stage
7	Gaziantepspor	34	14	6	14	50	51	−1	48	
8	Samsunspor	34	12	9	13	54	60	−6	45	
9	Kocaelispor	34	12	8	14	57	60	−3	44	
10	Altay	34	11	11	12	44	57	−13	44	
11	Kayserispor	34	12	6	16	62	70	−8	42	
12	Vanspor	34	11	6	17	38	50	−12	39	
13	Antalyaspor	34	10	8	16	39	46	−7	38	
14	MKE Ankaragücü	34	10	8	16	39	57	−18	38	
15	Denizlispor	34	8	11	15	42	55	−13	35	
16	Zeytinburnuspor (R)	34	7	9	18	35	74	−39	30	Relegation to Turkish Second Football League
17	Petrol Ofisi (R)	34	8	5	21	38	73	−35	29	Relegation to Turkish Second Football League
18	Adana Demirspor (R)	34	3	6	25	25	81	−56	15	Relegation to Turkish Second Football League

Rules for classification: 1) points; 2) goal difference; 3) number of goals scored.
(C) Champions; (R) Relegated

== Results ==
Home \ Away	ADS	ALT	ANT	BJK	BUR	DEN	FNB	GAL	GAZ	GEN	KAY	KOC	AGÜ	PET	SAM	TRA	VAN	ZEY
Adana Demirspor		1–4	1–0	0–1	2–3	1–1	0–1	1–2	3–2	0–7	0–2	1–1	2–3	1–1	2–0	0–3	0–0	1–2
Altay	3–2		1–1	2–8	1–1	1–1	2–1	0–3	5–2	1–1	2–1	0–2	1–1	1–0	3–2	0–1	3–2	2–0
Antalyaspor	2–1	0–1		1–1	0–1	1–1	2–1	0–5	2–3	0–0	2–0	1–0	2–0	0–1	2–0	1–3	1–0	4–0
Beşiktaş	3–0	1–0	2–1		1–2	2–0	0–0	2–3	2–0	2–0	4–1	7–1	5–1	3–1	1–0	4–0	3–0	3–1
Bursaspor	2–0	1–1	2–1	2–2		3–2	1–1	2–1	3–0	2–1	1–1	1–0	1–0	5–2	1–1	0–1	1–2	3–0
Denizlispor	2–0	1–1	0–0	1–3	3–1		2–3	0–0	2–1	0–0	3–0	4–3	0–0	1–1	1–2	0–1	4–0	1–0
Fenerbahçe	3–0	2–1	3–0	1–1	1–1	3–0		3–0	2–0	2–3	8–1	5–1	2–1	6–2	4–1	1–1	2–1	3–0
Galatasaray	3–0	3–1	0–3	3–1	0–0	4–0	1–1		1–2	3–1	2–1	4–1	2–1	2–0	0–1	2–1	4–1	4–0
Gaziantepspor	2–0	2–0	2–0	0–0	4–2	3–1	1–1	2–2		3–1	2–0	2–0	3–2	1–0	1–2	0–2	1–0	3–1
Gençlerbirliği	0–0	2–0	3–1	1–3	1–0	2–2	2–1	3–1	3–2		3–1	1–1	1–0	1–0	5–1	1–2	3–1	1–1
Kayserispor	4–2	1–1	4–2	1–2	2–1	5–1	1–2	0–2	1–1	3–4		4–2	4–2	3–1	2–2	0–0	4–1	2–1
Kocaelispor	1–1	7–1	2–1	1–1	1–1	4–1	3–2	0–2	2–1	3–2	4–3		2–0	4–0	0–0	2–2	2–0	4–1
MKE Ankaragücü	3–0	1–0	2–2	0–0	0–0	2–1	2–3	2–1	1–0	1–2	1–5	2–1		1–2	1–0	1–1	1–0	2–2
Petrol Ofisi	2–0	2–2	2–0	0–2	1–0	1–3	0–4	0–3	2–2	1–2	0–1	1–0	1–2		2–2	2–5	1–0	2–0
Samsunspor	5–1	0–1	1–0	2–3	1–1	1–1	1–2	2–2	2–1	1–3	2–2	1–0	4–2	8–2		3–1	2–1	1–1
Trabzonspor	7–0	3–1	0–0	0–2	1–0	3–1	1–0	2–2	3–0	4–0	5–2	4–0	4–0	3–2	5–0		0–0	3–0
Vanspor	2–0	1–1	1–4	0–2	2–0	2–1	1–0	1–2	2–0	2–1	3–0	0–0	1–1	3–2	5–1	0–2		1–1
Zeytinburnuspor	4–2	0–0	2–2	0–3	2–2	1–0	1–4	3–7	1–1	0–0	1–0	3–2	2–0	2–1	1–2	1–6	0–2	

Source: TFF, Mackolik
Legend: Blue = home team win; Yellow = draw; Red = away team win.

== Top scorers ==
Rank	Player	Club	Goals
1	(Turkey) Aykut Kocaman	Fenerbahçe	27
2	(Bosnia and Herzegovina) Elvir Bolić	Gaziantepspor	26
3	(Turkey) Saffet Sancaklı	Galatasaray	23
4	(Turkey) Ertuğrul Sağlam	Beşiktaş	22
5	(Turkey) Hakan Şükür	Galatasaray	19
5	(Turkey) Serkan Aykut	Samsunspor	19
7	(Turkey) Hami Mandıralı	Trabzonspor	15
7	(Slovenia) Matjaž Cvikl	Zeytinburnuspor	15
7	(Turkey) Recep Umut	Kayserispor	15
10	(Turkey) Levent Kurt	Kayserispor	14
10	(Turkey) Orhan Kaynak	Trabzonspor	14
