= Kadri Sancak =

Turkish footballer

Personal information
- Date of birth: 1 September 1966 (age 60)
- Place of birth: Istanbul, Turkey
- Position: Defender

Senior career*
Years	Team	Apps	(Gls)
1987–1995	Zeytinburnuspor		
1988	→ Denizlispor (loan)		
1995–1996	Denizlispor		
1996–1997	Gaziantepspor		
1997	Vanspor		
1997–1999	Altay		
1999–2000	Aydinspor		
2000–2001	Siirt Jetpaspor		
2001	Zeytinburnuspor		
2001–2003	Beykozspor		
2003	Zeytinburnuspor		
- * Club domestic league appearances and goals

Kadri Sancak (born 1 September 1966) is a retired Turkish football defender.
