= 1995–96 Turkish Cup =

Türkiye Kupası

Tournament details
- Country: Turkey
- Teams: 88

Final positions
- Champions: Galatasaray
- Runners-up: Fenerbahçe

Tournament statistics
- Matches played: 94
- Goals scored: 280 (2.98 per match)
- Top goal scorer(s): Abdurrahman Yavuz Kalkan; Hakan Demirel (6 goals each)

The 1995–96 Turkish Cup was the 34th edition of the tournament that determined the association football Süper Lig Turkish Cup (Turkish: Türkiye Kupası) champion under the auspices of the Turkish Football Federation (Turkish: Türkiye Futbol Federasyonu; TFF). champion under the auspices of the Turkish Football Federation (Turkish: Türkiye Futbol Federasyonu; TFF). Galatasaray successfully contested Fenerbahçe on both legs of the finals. The results of the tournament also determined which clubs would be promoted or relegated.

== Legacy ==
Graeme Souness planting the Galatasaray flag after defeating their bitter rivals Fenerbahce in the final is part of Turkish football history.

== First round ==
Team 1	Score	Team 2
İnegölspor	1–0	Bozüyükspor
Yeni Milasspor	0–1	Kuşadasıspor
Mustafakemalpaşaspor	3–2 (aet)	İzmirspor
Beykoz	2–1	Güngören Belediyespor
Eyüpspor	0–0 (3–0 p)	Gebzespor
Ceyhan Belediyespor	5–1	İskenderunspor
MKE Kırıkkalespor	2–0	Keçiörengücü
Kastamonuspor	1–0	Göztepe Belediyespor
Batman Belediyespor	w/o	Bingölspor
Trabzon Beldespor	2–1	Akçaabat Sebatspor

== Second round ==
Team 1	Score	Team 2
Bakırköyspor	3–1 (aet)	Beykoz
Çorluspor	1–3	Zeytinburnuspor
Kartalspor	1–0	Gaziosmanpaşa
Eyüpspor	1–1 (4–5 p)	Edirnespor
Sakaryaspor	1–2	Anadolu Hisarı İ.Y.
Çorumspor	4–6 (aet)	MKE Kırıkkalespor
Yozgatspor	5–5 (3–1 p)	Orduspor
Hatayspor	2–2 (3–5 p)	Mersinspor
Mersin İdman Yurdu	2–0	Adanaspor
Ceyhan Belediyespor	1–2	Adana Demirspor
Zonguldakspor	1–2	Düzcespor
Kardemir D.Ç. Karabükspor	1–0	Kastamonuspor
Boluspor	1–0	Beypazarıspor
Şekerspor	0–1	PTT
Konyaspor	3–1	Petrol Ofisi
Diyarbakırspor	3–0	Batman Petrolspor
Elazığspor	6–1	Siirt Köy Hiz.Yse Spor
Trabzon Beldespor	4–3 (aet)	Erzurumspor
Erzincanspor	3–2	Çaykur Rizespor
Şanlıurfaspor	2–1	Adıyamanspor
Malatyaspor	2–0	Kahramanmaraşspor
Yeni Afyonspor	1–0	Fethiyespor
Aydınspor	4–2	Bergamaspor
Balıkesirspor	3–1 (aet)	İnegölspor
Kemerspor	3–1	Alanyaspor
Lüleburgazspor	0–3	Sarıyer
Mustafakemalpaşaspor	1–1 (5–6 p)	Çanakkale Dardanelspor
Soma Linyitspor	5–1	Bucaspor
Yeni Turgutluspor	2–1	Göztepe
Yeni Salihlispor	0–1	Kuşadasıspor

== Third round ==
Team 1	Score	Team 2
Çanakkale Dardanelspor	3–2	Balıkesirspor
Kemerspor	1–2	Yeni Afyonspor
Turgutluspor	0–1	Aydınspor
Kuşadasıspor	1–0	Soma Linyitspor
Sarıyer	2–1	Bakırköyspor
Edirnespor	2–2 (3–4 p)	Kartalspor
Anadolu Hisarı İ.Y.	2–1 (aet)	Zeytinburnuspor
Mersin İdman Yurdu	2–3	Mersinspor
Adana Demirspor	3–1	Konyaspor
PTT	2–2 (5–3 p)	Kardemir D.Ç. Karabükspor
Boluspor	1–1 (4–1 p)	Düzcespor
Elazığspor	3–0	Diyarbakırspor
Trabzon Beldespor	4–2	Erzincanspor
Malatyaspor	4–1	Şanlıurfaspor
MKE Kırıkkalespor	1–0	Yozgatspor

== Fourth round ==
Team 1	Score	Team 2
Çanakkale Dardanelspor	2–1	Aydınspor
Kuşadasıspor	1–2	Karşıyaka
Kartalspor	0–0 (4–2 p)	Anadolu Hisarı İ.Y.
Sarıyer	0–0 (4–2 p)	İstanbulspor
Trabzon Beldespor	1–1 (11–10 p)	Elazığspor
Malatyaspor	4–2 (aet)	MKE Kırıkkalespor
Adana Demirspor	1–2	Mersinspor
Boluspor	0–1	Yeni Afyonspor
PTT	1–2	Eskişehirspor

== Fifth round ==
Team 1	Score	Team 2
Kocaelispor	2–1	Yeni Afyonspor
Kartalspor	1–2	Denizlispor
Trabzon Beldespor	0–2	Eskişehirspor
Karşıyaka	1–2 (aet)	Altay
Antalyaspor	1–0	Sarıyer
Mersinspor	1–2	Ankaragücü
Vanspor	1–0	Kayserispor
Malatyaspor	3–2	Çanakkale Dardanelspor

== Sixth round ==
Team 1	Score	Team 2
Fenerbahçe	1–1 (5–4 p)	Kocaelispor
Beşiktaş	2–0	Antalyaspor
Eskişehirspor	1–4	Gençlerbirliği
Samsunspor	2–0	Vanspor
Altay	1–2	Gaziantepspor
Bursaspor	0–0 (3–4 p)	Ankaragücü
Malatyaspor	1–3	Trabzonspor
Galatasaray	4–0	Denizlispor

== Quarter-finals ==
Team 1	Agg.	Team 2	1st leg	2nd leg
Galatasaray	2–1	Beşiktaş	0–0	2–1
Samsunspor	(a) 2–2	Trabzonspor	0–1	2–1
Gaziantepspor	(a) 2–2	Ankaragücü	1–0	1–2
Gençlerbirliği	2–3	Fenerbahçe	1–1	1–2

== Semi-finals ==
=== Summary table ===
Team 1	Agg.	Team 2	1st leg	2nd leg
Gaziantepspor	3–4	Fenerbahçe	1–2	2–2
Galatasaray	3–2	Samsunspor	3–1	0–1

=== 1st leg ===
28 February 1996 Semi-final	Gaziantepspor	1–2	Fenerbahçe	Gaziantep
13:00 EET (UTC+02)	Mehmet 66'		Aykut 31'; Bolić 56'	Stadium: Kamil Ocak Stadium; Referee: Nedim Göklü

28 February 1996 Semi-final	Galatasaray	3–1	Samsunspor	Istanbul
19:00 EET (UTC+02)	Saunders 16', 90'; Hakan 42'		Timofte 44'	Stadium: Ali Sami Yen Stadium; Referee: İbrahim Aksoy

=== 2nd leg ===
13 March 1996 Semi-final	Fenerbahçe	2–2	Gaziantepspor	Istanbul
19:00 EET (UTC+02)	Hüseyin 19' (o.g.); Aykut 75'		Ayhan 65'; Ali Kemal 70'	Stadium: Şükrü Saracoğlu Stadium; Referee: Sadık İlhan

13 March 1996 Semi-final	Samsunspor	1–0	Galatasaray	Samsun
20:00 EET (UTC+02)	Ercan 35'			Stadium: Samsun 19 Mayıs Stadium; Referee: Nedim Göklü

== Final ==
=== 1st leg ===
11 April 1996 Final	Galatasaray	1–0	Fenerbahçe	Istanbul, Turkey
19:00 EEST (UTC+03)	Saunders 5'			Stadium: Ali Sami Yen Stadium; Referee: Ahmet Çakar

=== 2nd leg ===
24 April 1996 Final	Fenerbahçe	1–1 (a.e.t.)	Galatasaray	Istanbul, Turkey
19:00 EEST (UTC+03)	Aykut 34'		Saunders 116'	Stadium: Şükrü Saracoğlu Stadium; Referee: Ayhan Yücebilgiç

Galatasaray won 2–1 on aggregate.

== See also ==
- 1995–96 1.Lig
