= Evren Nuri Turhan =

Turkish footballer (born 1974)

Evren Turhan
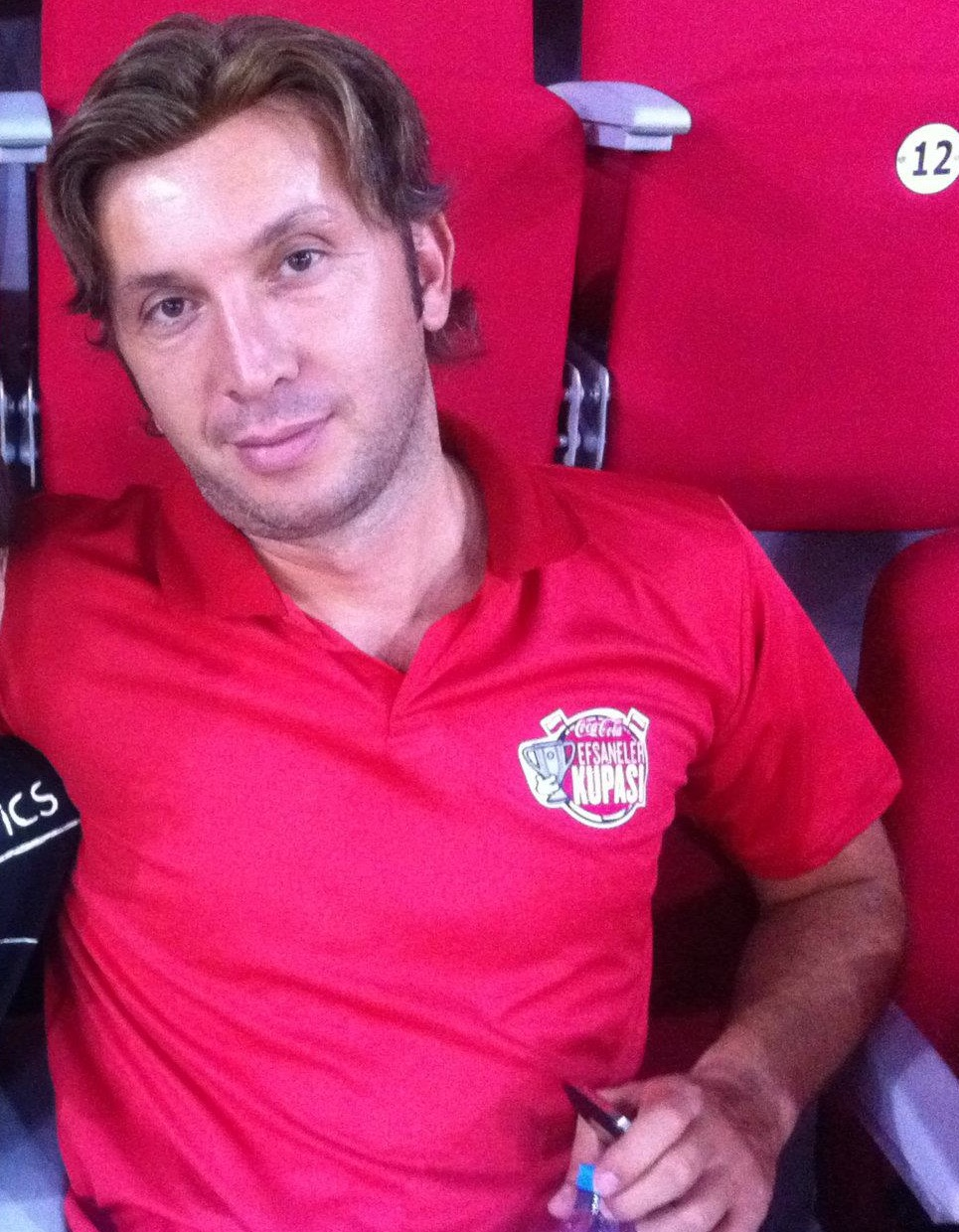
- Turhan in 2012

Personal information
- Full name: Evren Nuri Turhan
- Date of birth: 10 September 1974 (age 52)
- Place of birth: Kayseri, Turkey
- Height: 1.80 m (5 ft 11 in)
- Position: Midfielder

Senior career*
| Years | Team | Apps | (Gls) |
| 1992–1994 | Balıkesirspor | 42 | (3) |
| 1994–1995 | Kocaelispor | 47 | (7) |
| 1995–1996 | Galatasaray | 26 | (2) |
| 1996–1999 | Kocaelispor | 74 | (6) |
| 1999–2000 | Siirt Jetpaspor | 33 | (3) |
| 2000–2001 | Adanaspor | 27 | (3) |
| 2001–2002 | Malatyaspor | 29 | (3) |
| 2002–2003 | Diyarbakırspor | 24 | (2) |
| 2003–2004 | Samsunspor | 36 | (2) |
| 2004–2005 | MKE Ankaragücü | 42 | (1) |
| 2006 | Malatyaspor | 16 | (4) |
| 2006–2008 | Etimesgut Şekerspor | 48 | (21) |
| 2007 | → Sakaryaspor (loan) | 12 | (1) |
| 2008–2009 | Kayseri Erciyesspor | 31 | (5) |

International career
| 1997 | Turkey | 2 | (0) |
- * Club domestic league appearances and goals

Evren Nuri Turhan (born 10 September 1974) is a Turkish former professional footballer who played as a midfielder.

== Honours ==
Galatasaray

- Turkish Cup: 1995–96
