= Edirne 25 November Stadium =

Football stadium in Edirne, Turkey

- Edirne 25 Kasım Stadyumu
- Interactive map of Edirne 25 November Stadium
- Location: Edirne, Turkey
- Coordinates: 41°40′14″N 26°33′16″E
- Owner: Edirnespor
- Capacity: 3,500
- Field size: 105 m × 68 m (344 ft × 223 ft)

Construction
- Built: 1950
- Opened: November 25, 1950; 75 years ago

Edirne 25 November Stadium (Turkish: Edirne 25 Kasım Stadyumu) is a football stadium in Edirne, Turkey and is the home ground of the football club Edirnespor. The stadium has an all-seated capacity of 3,500.
