= Ömer Kılıç =

Turkish footballer

Personal information
- Date of birth: 24 December 1971 (age 54)
- Place of birth: Ordu, Turkey
- Height: 1.77 m (5 ft 10 in)
- Position: Defender

Senior career*
Years	Team	Apps	(Gls)
1990–1994	Orduspor	78	(1)
1992–1993	→ Sökespor (loan)		
1994–2004	Bursaspor	264	(6)
2004–2005	Çanakkale Dardanelspor		
2005–2007	Şanlıurfaspor		

International career
1995	Turkey	2	(0)
- * Club domestic league appearances and goals

Ömer Kılıç (born 24 December 1971) is a Turkish footballer who played as a defender for Bursaspor for ten straight Süper Lig seasons. He served as the captain of Bursapor. He was capped twice for Turkey.

He moved back to his hometown Ordu after finishing his football career.
