= Hayrettin Demirbaş =

Turkish footballer and coach

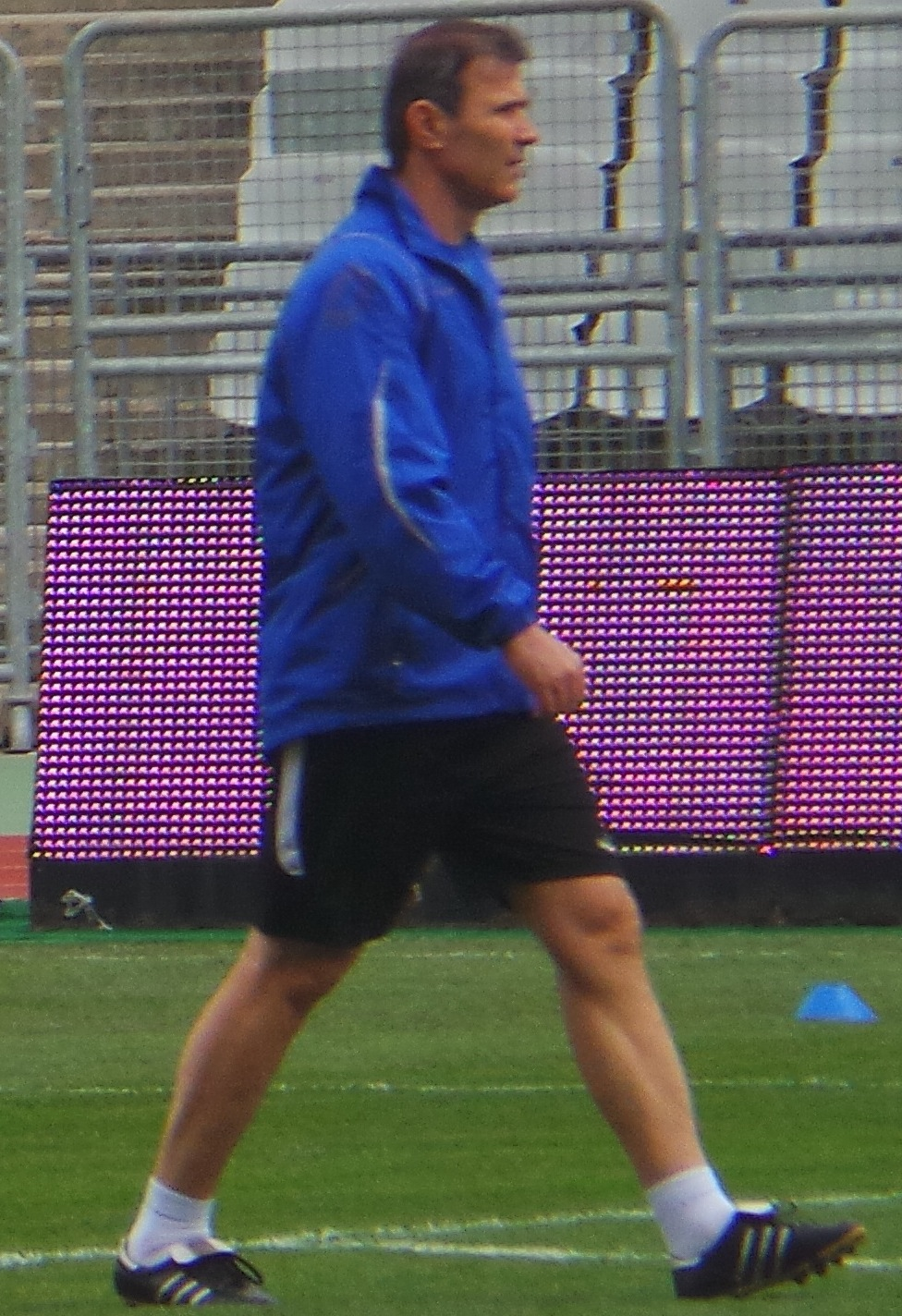
- Demirbaş in 2014

Personal information
- Full name: Hayrettin Demirbaş
- Date of birth: 26 June 1963 (age 63)
- Place of birth: Istanbul, Turkey
- Position: Goalkeeper

Youth career
- Küçükköyspor
- 1977–1981: Altay

Senior career*
Years	Team	Apps	(Gls)
1980–1986	Altay	24	(0)
1985–1986	→ Afyonspor (loan)	25	(0)
1986–1996	Galatasaray	149	(0)
1994–1995	→ Vanspor (loan)	12	(0)
1997–2000	Zeytinburnuspor	16	(0)
2000	Ağrıspor	6	(0)
2010	51 Niğdespor	2	(0)
Total		234	(0)

International career
1991–1994	Turkey	18	(0)

Managerial career
- 2002–2003: Bucaspor (goalkeeping coach)
- 2003: Bucaspor
- 2006: Erzurumspor
- 2006: Nazilli Belediyespor
- 2008: Belediye Bingölspor
- 2010–2011: Atilla Spor Izmir
- 2011–2012: Manisaspor (goalkeeping coach)
- 2013–2014: Manisaspor (goalkeeping coach)
- 2014–2015: Balıkesirspor (goalkeeping coach)
- 2016: Manisaspor (goalkeeping coach)
- 2016–2017: Bandırmaspor (goalkeeping coach)
- * Club domestic league appearances and goals

Hayrettin Demirbaş (born 26 June 1963) is a Turkish former international footballer and current coach. He spent majority of his career playing at Galatasaray.

== Career ==
In 2010, Demirbaş made a comeback at the age of 47, after 12 years of retirement and signed for 51 Niğdespor at Turkish Regional Amateur League. He made his debut for 51 Niğdespor on 22 February 2010 when 51 Niğdespor beat Polis Meslek Yüksekokulu by 7–1.

He retired once again on 2010 March following unsuccessful 3. Lig promotion attempt of 51 Niğdespor, as club was beaten by Niğde Belediyspor on a 1–0 at playoffs.
