= Feti Okuroğlu =

Turkish footballer (born 1971)

Personal information
- Date of birth: 5 August 1971 (age 55)
- Place of birth: İzmir, Turkey
- Position: Centre back

Feti Okuroglu (born 5 August 1971) is a former Turkish footballer who played as a centre-back for Galatasaray and the Turkey national team.

== Honours ==
Galatasaray

- Turkish Cup: 1995–96
