= Ağrıspor =

Turkish football club

- Full name: Ağrı Spor Kulübü
- Founded: 1970
- Dissolved: 2008
- Ground: Vali Lütfü Yiğenoğlu Stadium
- Capacity: 10,000
- Chairman: Şevki Şahin (until dissolving)

Ağrı Spor Kulübü, colloquially known as Ağrıspor, was a Turkish professional football club located in Ağrı. The club competed in varied levels of Turkish football league system, most notably in at TFF First League between 1998 and 2001. The club was dissolved in 2008.

== History ==
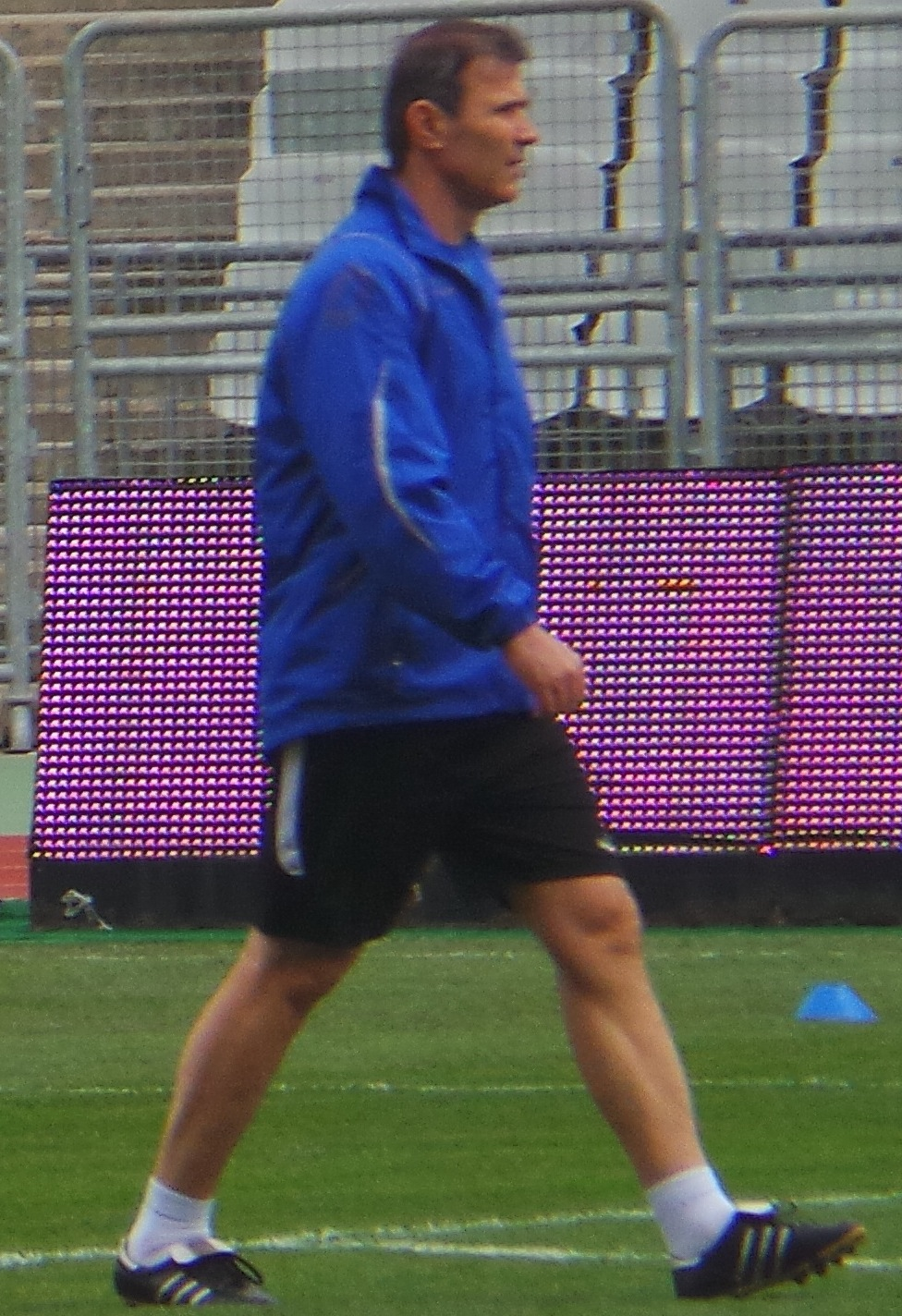
Former Turkish international (18 caps) and Galatasaray goalkeeper Hayrettin Demirbaş played in Ağrıspor in 2000

Ağrıspor was founded in 1970. They competed in amateur level until 1984. Collecting 71 points in 30 games, they finished the Group 1 (total of 8 groups) of 1997–98 Turkish Third Football League at first place, 14 points adrift Silopi Belediyespor, winning the first and only title of the club amongst the professional leagues. Competing at Group 5 and gaining oly 9th place out of 10 with 30 points in 18 games, they relegated in 2001–02 TFF First League.

== Team records ==
=== League affiliation ===
- TFF First League: 1998–2001
- TFF Second League: 1984–1993, 1994–1998, 2001–2002
- TFF Third League: 2002–2003
- Turkish Regional Amateur League: 1970–1984, 1993–1994, 2003–2008

== Honours ==
- TFF Third League
  - Winner: 1997–98 (Group 1)
