= Yeni Milasspor =

- Full name: Yeni Milasspor
- Founded: 1978
- Ground: Mugla District Stadium
- Chairman: Halil Íbrahim Gulen
- Manager: Cenk Asatoy
- League: Mugla Super Amateur League
- 2023-24: withdrawn
Home colours

Yeni Milasspor is a Turkish football club based in Muğla, Turkey. It is of amateur status after being relegated from the TFF Third League in 2000–01.

== History ==
Established in 1975 as Milas Esnafspor, it was renamed Milasspor in 1978.

New Milasspor

Then coach Ergin Demir was fired from the team as well as assistant Birol Erten, captain Mehmet Dönmez and player Erdinç Özcan in 2010. Dömez was removed for undisciplined behavior and the staff were removed by mutual understanding.

In 2016, funds deteriorated and New Milasspor descended into financial difficulties. It held a lottery to allocate funds for their club.

Cenk Asatoy was appointed manager of Yeni Milasspor in 2016 following a meeting of the club's directorate.

== Supporters ==
Yeni Milasspor has a supporters group, the New Milasspor Supporters Association, whose president is Nihat Abbak. They distribute Yeni Milasspor scarves and other memorabilia to fans and gave the Milas governor Eren Arslan an exclusive number 48 jersey.

== Managers ==
- Mehmet Alpez(2013–14)
- Ergin Demir
- Cenk Atasot(2016-)

== League participations ==
- TFF Third League: 1984–2001
- Turkish Regional Amateur League: 2010–2011
- Amateur Leagues: 1978–1984, 2001–2010, 2011–2020, 2021–2023

== Honours ==
Muğla Super Amateur League

Winners (2): 2016–17, 2017–18
Runners-up (1): 2009–10
