= Abdurrahman Yavuz Kalkan =

Turkish footballer

Personal information
- Date of birth: 19 August 1973 (age 53)
- Place of birth: Mardin, Turkey
- Position: Forward

Abdurrahman Yavuz Kalkan (born 19 August 1973) is a Turkish former professional footballer who played as a striker. He is most well known for playing for the Malatya-based Turkish club Malatyaspor.
