= Ramazan Tunç =

Turkish footballer

Personal information
- Full name: Ramazan Tunç
- Date of birth: 17 September 1975 (age 51)
- Place of birth: Gümüşhane, Turkey
- Height: 1.85 m (6 ft 1 in)
- Position: Centre-back

Senior career*
Years	Team	Apps	(Gls)
1996–1997	MKE Ankaragücü	30	(2)
1997–2003	Gaziantepspor	131	(8)
2002–2003	→ Diyarbakirspor (loan)	27	(1)
2003–2004	Diyarbakirspor	31	(2)
2004–2008	Ankaraspor	44	(4)
2008	Çamlıdere Şekerspor	7	(0)
2008–2011	Ankaraspor	0	(0)
2011–2012	Polatlı Bugsaşspor	0	(0)
Total		270	(17)

International career
1996–1997	Turkey U21	8	(0)
1997	Turkey U23	3	(0)
1997–2001	Turkey	3	(0)
- * Club domestic league appearances and goals

Ramazan Tunç (born 17 September 1975) is a Turkish former professional footballer who played as a centre-back. He earned three caps for the Turkey national team.
