= Hakan Keleş =

Turkish footballer and manager

Personal information
- Date of birth: 8 January 1972 (age 54)
- Place of birth: Adapazarı, Turkey
- Height: 1.78 m (5 ft 10 in)
- Positions: Midfielder; forward

Team information
- Current team: Adanaspor (head coach)

Senior career*
Years	Team	Apps	(Gls)
1993–1994	Edirnespor	24	(15)
1994–1996	Bursaspor	51	(6)
1996–1997	Kayseri Erciyesspor	34	(6)
1997–1998	Turanspor	30	(9)
1998–2004	Ankaragücü	202	(40)
2005–2006	Antalyaspor	41	(14)
2006–2007	Dardanelspor	31	(8)
Total		427	(113)

Managerial career
- 2018-2019: Sivasspor
- 2020–2023: Giresunspor
- 2023–2024: Konyaspor
- 2024–2025: Kasımpaşa
- 2025: Adanaspor
- * Club domestic league appearances and goals

Hakan Keleş (born 8 January 1972) is a Turkish football manager and former player.

== Club career ==
Hakan Keleş started his professional career in the 1993–94 season with Edirnespor in the TFF Third League. Following an impressive performance, he transferred to Bursaspor in the Süper Lig the next season. After playing two seasons with Bursaspor, he joined Kayserispor in the Second League for one season. In the 1998–99 season, he transferred to Ankaragücü.

Hakan played for Ankaragücü for the next 6.5 seasons, making 202 league appearances and serving as the team captain for a period. During the 2004–05 season, in the winter transfer window, he left Ankaragücü and joined Antalyaspor in the TFF First League. After spending two seasons with the Antalya-based club, he returned to the TFF Second League in the 2006–07 season by joining Çanakkale Dardanelspor. His contract was terminated at the end of the season, and Hakan decided to retire from professional football.

== Managerial career ==
On 19 November 2018, was briefly named the manager of Sivasspor after a stint as their assistant manager. On 10 August 2020, he was named the manager of TFF First League club Giresunspor, signing a 2+1 year contract. In his first season at the club, he helped them get promoted into the Süper Lig for the first time in 44 years. His team avoided relegation in the 2021-22 season, coming in 16th place.

On November 13, 2024, Kasımpaşa announced that they had reached an agreement with Keleş for the head coach position.

== Honours ==
=== Player ===
Ankaragücü

- Turkish Cup: Third place (1): 1998–99

=== Manager ===
Giresunspor

- 1. Lig: Winners (1): 2020–21

== Statistics ==
=== Club ===
Appearances and goals by club, season, and competition
Club	Season	League			National Cup		Total	
Club	Season	Division	Apps	Goals	Apps	Goals	Apps	Goals
Edirnespor	1993–94	Third League	24	15	–	–	24	15
Total			24	15	–	–	24	15
Bursaspor	1994–95	Süper Lig	25	3	5	1	30	4
Bursaspor	1995–96	Süper Lig	26	3	4	2	30	5
Total			51	6	9	3	60	9
Kayseri Erciyesspor	1996–97	Second League	34	6	3	1	37	7
Total			34	6	3	1	37	7
Turanspor	1997–98	Second League	30	9	2	0	32	9
Total			30	9	2	0	32	9
Ankaragücü	1998–99	Süper Lig	34	9	5	1	39	10
Ankaragücü	1999–2000	Süper Lig	33	8	4	2	37	10
Ankaragücü	2000–01	Süper Lig	31	7	6	1	37	8
Ankaragücü	2001–02	Süper Lig	35	6	3	0	38	6
Ankaragücü	2002–03	Süper Lig	35	6	4	1	39	7
Ankaragücü	2003–04	Süper Lig	34	4	5	1	39	5
Total			202	40	27	6	229	46
Antalyaspor	2004–05	First League	13	3	–	–	13	3
Antalyaspor	2005–06	First League	41	14	2	0	43	14
Total			54	17	2	0	56	17
Dardanelspor	2006–07	Second League	31	8	1	0	32	8
Total			31	8	1	0	32	8
Career Total			427	113	44	11	471	124

=== Managerial statistics ===
As of 27 January 2024

Team	Nat	From	To	Record				
Team	Nat	From	To	G	W	D	L	Win %
Sivasspor	(Turkey)	19 November 2018	30 June 2019	22	7	6	9	31.8
Giresunspor	(Turkey)	10 August 2020	2 May 2023	110	44	25	41	40.0
Konyaspor	(Turkey)	27 October 2023	11 January 2024	12	4	3	5	33.3
Kasımpaşa	(Turkey)	13 November 2024	28 January 2025	10	3	5	2	30.0
Total				154	58	39	57	37.7
