= Orhan Üstündağ =

Turkish footballer

Personal information
- Date of birth: 1 February 1967 (age 59)
- Place of birth: Kastamonu, Turkey
- Position: Defender

Senior career*
| Years | Team | Apps | (Gls) |
| 1984–1989 | Karabükspor | | |
| 1989–2001 | Altay | | |
| 2001–2002 | Manisaspor | | |
- * Club domestic league appearances and goals

Orhan Üstündağ (born 1 February 1967) is a retired Turkish football defender.
