= İlyas Kahraman =

Turkish footballer

Personal information
- Date of birth: March 31, 1976 (age 50)
- Place of birth: Istanbul, Turkey
- Position: Midfielder

Youth career
- Galatasaray

Senior career*
Years	Team	Apps	(Gls)
1995–1997	Galatasaray	43	(0)
1997–2000	Gaziantepspor	81	(10)
2000–2001	Yimpaş Yozgatspor	41	(6)
2001–2004	Denizlispor	59	(6)
2004–2005	Malatyaspor	31	(6)
2005	Bursaspor	15	(1)
2005–2006	Diyarbakırspor	31	(9)
2006–2007	Antalyaspor	27	(1)
2007–2009	İstanbul BB	29	(5)
2009	Boluspor	11	(2)
2009–2010	Adanaspor	28	(2)
2010–2012	Eyüpspor	32	(5)

International career
1991	Turkey U-16	1	(0)
- * Club domestic league appearances and goals

İlyas Kahraman (born March 31, 1976) is a Turkish retired professional soccer player. He was a midfielder and in the 2000–01 season he was suspended from football for six months after failing a doping test.

== Biography ==
After being promoted from Galatasaray's youth club to senior club, Ilyas played for Galatasaray. His career dramatically changed after he missed a crucial penalty in a historical Turkish Cup match against Gençlerbirliği on November 28, 1996. After leaving Galatasaray, he played for Gaziantepspor, Yimpaş Yozgatspor, Denizlispor, Malatyaspor, Bursaspor and Diyarbakırspor. After Diyarbakırspor were relegated Kahraman has been transferred to recently promoted Antalyaspor.

On 2000–01 season he was suspended from football for six months after failing a doping test.

Kahraman made his debut for Antalyaspor in Çaykur Rizespor match on 6 August 2006. He also played in İstanbul Büyükşehir Belediyespor between 2007 and 2009.
