= Metin Tokat =

Turkish former association football referee

Metin Tokat (Batman, May 27, 1960) is a former Turkish association football referee who was active on the highest level in Europe between 1998 and 2003 and in Turkey between 1980 and 2006. He refereed international matches as well as matches in the Europa League and the Süper Lig. In his career, he refereed 305 matches.

== International matches ==
Date	Place	Match	Result	Competition	Booked	Yellow-red card	Sent off
12-11-1995	Ta' Qali	Malta – Belarus	0 – 2	UEFA European Championship qualification	3	0	0
11-03-1997	Sofia	Bulgaria – Slovakia	0 – 1	Friendly	2	0	0
20-08-1997	Bucharest	Romania – Macedonia	4 – 2	FIFA World Championship qualification	5	0	0
07-10-1997	Chișinău	Moldavia – Poland	0 – 3	FIFA World Championship qualification	4	0	0
15-11-1997	Belgrade	Yugoslavia – Hungary	5 – 0	FIFA World Championship qualification	4	0	0
09-06-1999	Moscow	Russia – Iceland	1 – 0	UEFA European Championship qualification	1	0	0
29-03-2000	Ashkelon	Israel – Georgia	1 – 1	Friendly	1	0	0
13-12-2000	Xanthi	Greece – Yugoslavia	1 – 1	Friendly	0	0	0
21-08-2002	Constanța	Romania – Greece	0 – 1	Friendly	2	0	0

== See also ==
- List of association football referees
