= Ahmet Çakar =

Turkish sportscaster and football referee (born 1962)

- Born: 3 August 1962 (age 64); Istanbul, Turkey
- Other name: Ahmet Murat Çakar
- Occupations: Medicine, football referee
- Children: 2

Ahmet Çakar
Domestic
Years	League	Role
1990–1999	1. Lig	Referee

International
Years	League	Role
1992–1999	FIFA-listed	Referee

Ahmet Murat Çakar (born 3 August 1962) is a Turkish doctor, sportscaster, actor and a former football referee. According to IFFHS, he is one of the world's best referees of the quarter of a century. Described as "Turkey's most controversial football pundit", he is famous for his bold claims and humorous manner, and is popular in Turkey both as a pundit and an internet meme.

== Biography ==
He was born in Istanbul on August 3, 1962. He completed his high school education at Istanbul Erkek Lisesi in 1980. He then graduated from the Faculty of Medicine at Istanbul University.

He is famous for the abrasive but funny manner in which he presents the Show TV sports programme Altıpas, being described as "Turkey's most controversial football pundit". He also writes sports articles for Sabah newspaper. He is a medical doctor as well. Currently he is a commentator on the Turkish football television programme Beyaz Futbol, on Beyaz TV. According to IFFHS, he is one of the world's best referees of the quarter of a century.

== Controversy ==
=== Attempted assassination ===
On February 25, 2004, he was attacked in an attempted assassination with five bullets hitting him directly, however, he survived. He later commented on the matter saying that he knows nothing about who was behind it, but he believed he is extremely famous. He also stated that his near death experience strengthened his faith in Allah.

=== Bikini controversy ===
In 2008 Çakar challenged Fenerbahçe on live TV. He stated that if Fenerbahçe qualifies for the Quarter-finals in the UEFA Champions League, he will wear a bikini. That year, Fenerbahçe qualified for the quarter-finals, and photoshopped images of Çakar in a bikini were shown in newspapers. A bikini company, sunset mayo, announced that they will be "more than happy to help Mr. Çakar keep his promise". Another swimsuit company, Zeki Triko, sent their most expensive swimsuit to Çakar for free, adding that it is "merely worthy of his excellence".

Çakar subsequently received hundreds of packages of gifts made up of swimwear. He later stated that "it was merely a joke, come on, gentlemen". He also stated that he liked and laughed at the jokes and images, but was scared of his wife's reaction. In 2015, Fenerbahçe released a video making fun of Çakar and reminding him that he still hasn't kept his promise.

=== UEFA 2013 quarter-final draws controversy ===
In March 2013, Çakar appeared on TV claiming that the draws for the quarter-finals of UEFA's club competitions had been fixed by those making the draw "carrying metal objects that sensed vibrations in the balls being selected."

=== Claims about aliens and Saddam Hussein ===
In 2014, Çakar claimed in a football discussion that Saddam Hussein is secretly alive, and that aliens are real. Claiming that his knowledge about aliens is deeply rooted, he added that "the aliens changed their ways, they now disguise themselves as aliens. Maybe they want to help us. They are protecting Obama."

=== Albert Einstein controversy ===
In 2015, he claimed on live TV that "Albert Einstein was a genius who changed the world. But in the end, he was a lowly human who treated his wife like a dog! People who are successful in public are often rotten in their private life."

=== Rap controversy ===
In 2015, he controversially stated on live TV that "Rap is utter disgrace. Nobody can tell me rap is art. Rap is not art. Rap is buffoonery. Whoever raps or listens to rap probably had problems when they were little." He later targeted popular rapper Sagopa Kajmer and said "why would you name yourself "Sagopa Kajmer"? Proves that you are broken". This caused a spark of outrage, and multiple rappers demanded that he should apologise. Some celebrities supported him, stating that he was simply joking. Çakar responded by saying "95 percent of you rappers are broken. 90-95 percent of you have severe psychological or physical trauma as a child. Your looks are broken. Most of you do not take showers, you are filthy. Some of you are drug addicts". These statements caused even more controversy.

=== Fly eating controversy ===
In May 2022, while commenting on a match between Fenerbahçe and Beşiktaş in live TV, a horse fly was seen flying around the studio. As the program continued, Çakar remarked, "If that fly passes through my airspace, I'll do what I have to". The fly then approached Çakar, who grabbed the fly and ate it. Sinan Engin reacted by saying "good for you, free vitamins" while Rasim Ozan Kütahyalı, who was also present, held his vomit and silently remarked "may Allah destroy you". The event provoked criticism as well as support from the public and evolved into a scandal. When interviewed later, Çakar remarked "I am not easily disgusted. By God, I have eaten worse things, but the public is not ready for it."

=== Glasses controversy ===
In 2022, after Ertem Şener, the presenter, asked Çakar, "How are the glasses cleaned?", Çakar took off his glasses and started licking it. Everyone in the room questioned what he was doing, but he ignored the criticism. The glasses did not belong to Çakar.

=== Football betting investigations ===
As part of the betting investigation conducted by the Istanbul Chief Public Prosecutor's Office, Çakar was taken into custody on December 5, 2025. During medical examinations, he responded to reporters' questions asking, "Why were you taken into custody?" with "I don't know." A detention order was also issued for his wife, Arzu Çakar, but it was determined that she was abroad. Ahmet Çakar, who suffered a heart spasm while in custody as part of the investigation, was transferred to Istanbul Training and Research Hospital and underwent an angiography procedure. On the same day, the detention order was lifted due to his health condition, and he was ordered to be transferred to the courthouse after completing his treatment.

== Major matches refereed ==
Date	Match	Tournament	Ref
6 March 1993	Uruguay – Ghana (1-1)	1993 FIFA World Youth Championship	
11 March 1993	Germany – Uruguay (1–2)	1993 FIFA World Youth Championship	
20 March 1993	Ghana – Brazil (1–2)	1993 FIFA World Youth Championship Final	
7 April 1993	Beşiktaş J.K. – Galatasaray S.K. (2-2)	1992-93 Turkish Cup Final	
4 May 1994	Beşiktaş J.K. – Galatasaray S.K. (3–2)	1993-94 Turkish Cup Final	
1 March 1995	A.C. Milan – Benfica (2–0)	1994–95 UEFA Champions League Quarterfinals	
5 April 1995	Bayern Munich – Ajax Amsterdam (0-0)	1994–95 UEFA Champions League Semi-finals	
11 April 1996	Galatasaray S.K. – Fenerbahçe S.K. (1–0)	1995–96 Turkish Cup Final	
18 June 1996	Romania – Spain (1–2)	UEFA Euro 1996 1. round	
19 March 1997	Trabzonspor – Kocaelispor (1-1)	1996–97 Turkish Cup Final	

== Television career ==
=== Acting career ===
Movies
Year	Movie	Role
2009	Kanal-İ-Zasyon	Himself
2009	No Ofsayt	Himself
2016	Adam Mısın!	Himself

=== TV shows ===
TV
Year	Programme	Role
2001–2004, 2011	Telegol	Himself
2007	Ahmet Çakar'la Şansa Bak	Himself
2009	Ahmet Çakar'la Zor Karar	Himself
2011–	Beyaz/Derin Futbol	Himself
2013	Söz Sende	Himself
2013	Var Mısın Yok Musun	Himself
2015	Dada Dandinista	Himself
2016	Elin Oğlu	Himself
2016	3 Adam	Himself
2016	Renkli Sayfalar	Himself
