= Edirnespor =

Turkish football club

- Full name: Edirnespor Kulübü
- Founded: 1966; 59 years ago
- Ground: 25 Kasım; Edirne, Turkey
- Capacity: 4,000
- President: Savaş Üner
- Head coach: Cahit Erçevik
- League: TFF Third League
- 2021–22: TFF Third League, Group 3, 9th
- Website: https://www.edirnespor.org/
Home colours	Away colours

Edirnespor is the football team of Edirne, Turkey and her colours are yellow and red. Founded in 1966 In the beginning of 1990s Edirnespor was playing in the Turkish 2nd League. One season, they became second in their league and qualified for Play-offs but they didn't manage to play in Turkish Super League.They are currently playing in Turkish 3rd League.
