= Hamza Hamzaoğlu =

Turkish footballer and manager

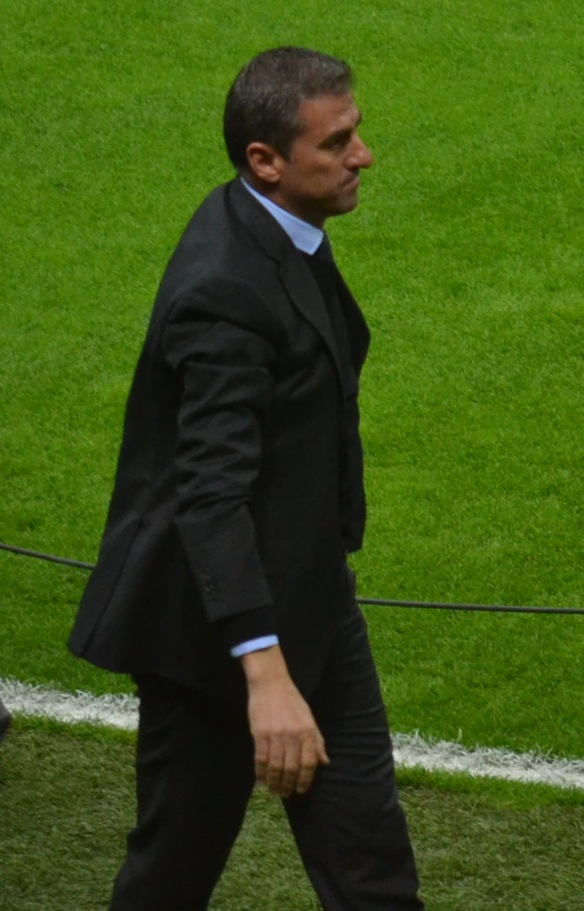
- Hamza Hamzaoğlu in 2015

Personal information
- Full name: Hamza Hamzaoğlu
- Date of birth: 15 January 1970 (age 56)
- Place of birth: Komotini, Greece
- Height: 1.84 m (6 ft 1/2 in)
- Position: Midfielder

Team information
- Current team: Al Shabab (assistant manager)

Senior career*
Years	Team	Apps	(Gls)
1988–1991	İzmirspor	34	(0)
1991–1995	Galatasaray	104	(10)
1995–1999	İstanbulspor	125	(19)
1999–2001	Siirtspor	60	(4)
2001	Alanyaspor	0	(0)
2001–2002	Yozgatspor	23	(2)
2002–2003	Konyaspor	34	(9)
2003–2004	Beylerbeyi	22	(4)
Total		402	(48)

International career
1991–1993	Turkey U21	9	(0)
1993	Turkey	1	(0)

Managerial career
- 2004: Konyaspor (caretaker)
- 2008–2009: Malatyaspor
- 2009–2010: Eyüpspor
- 2010–2011: Denizlispor
- 2011–2014: Akhisarspor
- 2014–2015: Galatasaray
- 2015–2017: Bursaspor
- 2017: Osmanlıspor
- 2018: Antalyaspor
- 2019: BB Erzurumspor
- 2019–2020: Gençlerbirliği
- 2020–2021: Yeni Malatyaspor
- 2021: Kayserispor
- 2021–2022: Çaykur Rizespor
- 2022: Eyüpspor
- 2024–: Al Shabab (assistant)
- * Club domestic league appearances and goals

Hamza Hamzaoğlu (born 1 July 1970) is a Turkish professional coach and former player, he is the assistant manager of Saudi Pro League club Al Shabab.

== Club career ==
Hamzaoğlu began his career in 1988 with İzmirspor. In 1995, he transferred to Galatasaray as captain and midfielder, where he won the league two times, the cup and Super Cup one time. He left the club after 4 years and later played for Siirtspor, İstanbulspor, Yozgatspor and Konyaspor, before ending his career at Beylerbeyi in 2004.

== International career ==
Hamzaoğlu represented the Turkey U21 national team from 1991 until 1993, making 9 appearances in the process. He also made one appearance for the senior Turkey national team in 1993.

== Managerial career ==
Hamzaoğlu began his managerial career with Konyaspor in 2004 as the club's caretaker manager, but it wasn't until 2008 that he signed a full-time contract with Malatyaspor. He left Malatyaspor the following year for Eyüpspor and managed Denizlispor a year later. In 2011, he was appointed at Akhisarspor, helping them achieve promotion to the Süper Lig by winning the club's first ever major trophy, the 2011–12 TFF First League. Hamzaoğlu also became the assistant of Fatih Terim in the Turkey national team the next year.

On 28 November 2014, he was appointed as the new manager of Galatasaray on the same day Cesare Prandelli was released from his contract. He signed a five-month contract until the end of the season. Hamzaoğlu won the league and the cup in that season, and in the following the Super Cup. His contract got terminated on 18 November 2015. Hamzaoğlu was also awarded the Turkish Manager of the Year Award for the year 2015.

He then managed Bursaspor, Osmanlıspor, Antalyaspor and BB Erzurumspor. In November 2019, he became the new manager of Süper Lig club Gençlerbirliği.

== Managerial statistics ==
Last updated 18 February 2022

Managerial record by team and tenure
Team	Nat	From	To	Record				
Team	Nat	From	To	G	W	D	L	Win %
Malatyaspor	(Turkey)	28 November 2008	9 March 2009	15	3	1	11	20.00
Eyüpspor	(Turkey)	2 October 2009	23 June 2010	34	19	6	9	55.88
Denizlispor	(Turkey)	19 July 2010	3 February 2011	24	9	9	6	37.50
Akhisar Belediyespor	(Turkey)	3 March 2011	30 June 2014	126	52	32	42	41.27
Galatasaray	(Turkey)	1 December 2014	18 November 2015	52	33	9	10	63.46
Bursaspor	(Turkey)	18 December 2015	23 January 2017	49	24	10	15	48.98
Osmanlıspor	(Turkey)	27 March 2017	9 June 2017	9	2	1	6	22.22
Antalyaspor	(Turkey)	4 January 2018	21 May 2018	18	6	3	9	33.33
BB Erzurumspor	(Turkey)	7 March 2019	28 May 2019	10	4	1	5	40.00
Gençlerbirliği	(Turkey)	1 November 2019	3 August 2020	25	8	6	11	32.00
Yeni Malatyaspor	(Turkey)	19 August 2020	21 February 2021	29	10	9	10	34.48
Kayserispor	(Turkey)	20 March 2021	25 April 2021	6	0	4	2	0.00
Çaykur Rizespor	(Turkey)	24 September 2021	19 February 2022	20	6	4	10	30.00
Eyüpspor	(Turkey)	24 February 2022	present	1	0	0	1	0.00
Total				418	176	95	147	42.11

== Honours ==
=== Player ===
Galatasaray

- Süper Lig: 1992–93, 1993–94
- Turkish Cup: 1993
- Turkish Super Cup: 1993

Konyaspor

- TFF First League: 2002–03

=== Manager ===
Akhisarspor

- TFF First League: 2011–12

Galatasaray

- Süper Lig: 2014–15
- Turkish Cup: 2014–15
- Turkish Super Cup: 2015

=== Individual ===
- Turkish Manager of the Year: 2015
