= Saffet Sancaklı =

Turkish politician

Member of the Grand National Assembly
- Incumbent
- Assumed office 23 June 2015
- Constituency: Kocaeli (June 2015, Nov 2015, 2018, 2023)

Personal details
- Born: 27 February 1966 (age 60) Tutin, SR Serbia, SFR Yugoslavia
- Party: Nationalist Movement Party (2007-2023, 2024-present)
- Height: 1.90 m (6 ft 3 in)
Association football career
- Position: Centre forward
Youth career
- 1983–1985: Kültürspor
Senior career*
Years	Team	Apps	(Gls)
1985–1987	Vefa SK		
1987–1991	Beşiktaş	25	(4)
1988–1989	→ Eskişehirspor (loan)	30	(11)
1989–1990	→ Konyaspor (loan)	24	(10)
1990–1991	→ Sarıyer G.K. (loan)	10	(0)
1991–1994	Kocaelispor	88	(63)
1994–1995	Galatasaray	43	(30)
1996	Kocaelispor	19	(14)
1996–1998	Fenerbahçe	58	(21)
1998–1999	Konyaspor	16	(8)
International career
1988	Turkey U21	1	(0)
1992–1996	Turkey	23	(6)
- * Club domestic league appearances and goals

Saffet Sancaklı (Serbian Cyrillic: Сафет Санџакли, romanized: Safet Sandžakli; born 27 February 1966) is a Turkish politician and former professional footballer who played as a centre forward. Born in Tutin, then part of Yugoslavia, he played in Turkey for teams such as Beşiktaş, Galatasaray and Fenerbahçe, and played 23 matches scoring 6 goals for the Turkey national team. He was part of Turkey's squad at UEFA Euro 1996. After retiring as a player he entered politics with the Nationalist Movement Party (MHP). He was elected to the Grand National Assembly of Turkey for Kocaeli Province in the June 2015 election and re-elected in November 2015. In December 2023 he announced his resignation from the MHP after a dispute with party leader Devlet Bahçeli.

== Early life ==
Sancaklı was born on 27 February 1966 in Tutin, in the Sandžak region of SR Serbia, Yugoslavia. He was the youngest in a family of five children. His father worked as a police superintendent while his mother stayed home. The family moved to Turkey in 1968 and settled in Istanbul. He grew up in the Küçükköy neighborhood of Gaziosmanpaşa. He began playing for the local team of Kültürspor and attended Vefa Poyraz High School.

== Club career ==
Sancaklı began his career with Kültürspor (1983–1985) and then joined Vefa (1985–1987). Sancaklı scored 130 goals in Süper Lig with different teams. He is third player (after Refik Osman Top and Ali Soydan) who played at the Big Three of Turkey, Beşiktaş (1987–1988), Galatasaray (1994–1995) and Fenerbahçe (1996–1998). He also played for Kültürspor (1983–1985), Vefa SK (1985–1987), Eskişehirspor (1988–1989, on loan), Sarıyer (1990–1991), Kocaelispor (1991–1994 and 1995–1996) and Konyaspor (1989–1990, on loan and 1998–1999).

== International career ==
Sancaklı played for Turkey national football team (23 matches with 6 goals) and was a participant at the 1996 UEFA European Championship.

== Political career ==
Sancaklı joined the MHP after his football career. He stood as an MHP candidate for Istanbul in the 2011 general election and as the party's candidate for mayor of Kocaeli metropolitan municipality in the 2014 local elections; He was finally elected as deputy from Kocaeli in the Turkish general elections of June 2015, and reelected in the November 2015 Turkish general election.

== 2023 resignation from the MHP ==
In December 2023, remarks attributed to Sancaklı at a meeting with the Kocaeli Journalists Association in parliament were reported in the press. According to these reports, he said that if the MHP were not given at least one municipality in Kocaeli in the 2024 local elections, he would not take part in the campaign there. Sancaklı denied having said this. Party leader Devlet Bahçeli responded publicly with a remark alluding to Sancaklı's habit, as a footballer, of playing for all three big Istanbul clubs, and MHP deputy chairman Semih Yalçın announced that Sancaklı's resignation from the party had been requested. On 9 December 2023 Sancaklı announced on social media that he was resigning from the MHP on the instructions of its chairman, to shield the party and the People's Alliance from speculation ahead of the local elections, and affirmed his continued loyalty to Bahçeli.

== Personal life ==
Sancaklı married his childhood friend Hülya Sancaklı and they have two children. His wife died on 1 February 2017, from firearm wounds caused by a suspected suicide.
