= Vanspor =

Turkish football club

- Full name: Vanspor
- Founded: 1974
- Dissolved: 2014
- Ground: Van Atatürk Stadı, Van
- Capacity: 10,500
| Home colours | Away colours |

Vanspor A.Ş. was a football team of Van in eastern Turkey.

== History ==
They played in the Süper Lig, top division of Turkish football, between 1994 and 1998, playing once more in 1999–2000 season. After relegation from the first division, Vanspor turned to an economic crisis and were relegated from the 2nd and 3rd divisions between 2000 and 2002. After relegation from the 3rd division in 2003, the club was renamed as İl Özel İdaresi Vanspor and played in Van Super Amateur. They changed name as Van Tuşba Belediyespor in 2013 and also changed colour as black-yellow. They finally withdrew from Van First Amateur League in 2014–15 season and merged with Van Büyükşehir Belediyespor. Due to mismanagement and bad results, almost all supporters of them moved to Van Büyükşehir Belediyespor.

Their nickname was "Canavarlar" which translates literally as "Monsters" in Turkish. Their first colours were black and yellow. In 1983 they converted to black and red. Finally, they converted to a white and light blue kit in 1997.
