= 1999 Turkish Cup final =

- Event: 1998–99 Turkish Cup
Galatasaray	Beşiktaş
2	0
- on aggregate

First leg
Galatasaray	Beşiktaş
0	0
- Date: 14 April 1999
- Venue: Ali Sami Yen Stadium, Istanbul
- Referee: Muhittin Boşat (Istanbul)

Second leg
Beşiktaş	Galatasaray
0	2
- Date: 5 May 1999
- Venue: BJK İnönü Stadium, Istanbul
- Referee: Oğuz Sarvan (İzmir)

The 1999 Turkish Cup final was a two-legged football match played on 14 April 1999 at the Ali Sami Yen Stadium and on 5 May 1999 at the BJK İnönü Stadium, both in Istanbul. They were the final and deciding matches of the 1998–99 Turkish Cup.

== Match details ==
=== First leg ===
14 April 1999
19:00 CEST

Galatasaray	0 – 0	Beşiktaş
	(Report)

Ali Sami Yen Stadium, Istanbul
Referee: Muhittin Boşat (Istanbul)

Galatasaray

Beşiktaş

GK	1	(Brazil) Cláudio Taffarel
RB	2	(Turkey) Ümit Davala
CB	3	(Turkey) Bülent Korkmaz
CB	4	(Turkey) Fatih Akyel
CM	5	(Turkey) Emre Belözoğlu		(substituted off) 73'
CF	6	(Turkey) Arif Erdem		(substituted off) 83'
CM	7	(Turkey) Okan Buruk
CM	8	(Turkey) Suat Kaya
CF	9	(Turkey) Hakan Şükür
CM	10	(Romania) Gheorghe Hagi	(yellow card) 23'
LB	11	(Turkey) Hakan Ünsal
Substitutes:
GK	12	(Turkey) Mehmet Bölükbaşı
MF	13	(Turkey) Tolunay Kafkas
MF	14	(Turkey) Tugay Kerimoğlu		(substituted on) 83'
DF	15	(Turkey) Vedat İnceefe
DF	16	(Turkey) Ergün Penbe		(substituted on) 73'
MF	17	(Turkey) Ufuk Talay
CF	18	(Turkey) Burak Akdiş
Manager:
(Turkey) Fatih Terim

GK	1	(Turkey) Fevzi Tuncay
DF	2	(Turkey) Savaş Kaya
MF	3	(Turkey) Yasin Sülün
DF	4	(Turkey) Ali Eren Beşerler
DF	5	(Morocco) Jamal Sellami
MF	6	(Turkey) Ertuğrul Sağlam
DF	7	(Turkey) Mutlu Topçu
MF	8	(Turkey) Ayhan Akman	(yellow card) 60'	(substituted off) 68'
FW	9	(Turkey) Oktay Derelioğlu	(yellow card) 29'	(substituted off) 76'
MF	10	(Turkey) Mehmet Özdilek	(yellow card) 15'
FW	11	(Nigeria) Daniel Amokachi	(yellow card) 52'	(substituted off) 88'
Substitutes:
GK	12	(Turkey) Ekrem Köse
DF	13	(Turkey) Serdar Topraktepe		(substituted on) 88'
DF	14	(Turkey) Erkan Avseren
MF	15	(Peru) José del Solar	(yellow card) 76'	(substituted on) 68'
MF	16	(Turkey) Nihat Kahveci		(substituted on) 76'
MF	17	(Turkey) Aydın Tuna
MF	18	(Turkey) Hikmet Çapanoğlu
Manager:
(Germany) Karl-Heinz Feldkamp

Match officials

- Assistant referees:
  - Fahir Ersoy (Istanbul)
  - Hüseyin Darıcı (Istanbul)
- Fourth official: Erol Ersoy (İzmir)

=== Second leg ===
5 May 1999
20:00 CEST

Beşiktaş	0 – 2	Galatasaray
	(Report)	Ümit Davala 52' 68'

BJK İnönü Stadium, Istanbul
Referee: Oğuz Sarvan (İzmir)

Beşiktaş

Galatasaray

GK	1	(Turkey) Fevzi Tuncay
DF	2	(Turkey) Savaş Kaya
MF	3	(Turkey) Tayfur Havutçu
DF	4	(Morocco) Jamal Sellami	(yellow card) 15'	(substituted off) 82'
DF	5	(Turkey) Alpay Özalan	(yellow card) 18'
MF	6	(Turkey) Ertuğrul Sağlam		(substituted off) 65'
DF	7	(Turkey) Mutlu Topçu
MF	8	(Turkey) Ayhan Akman		(substituted off) 75'
FW	9	(Turkey) Yasin Sülün	(yellow card) 19'
MF	10	(Turkey) Mehmet Özdilek
FW	11	(Nigeria) Daniel Amokachi
Substitutes:
GK	12	(Turkey) Hakan Çalışkan
DF	13	(Turkey) Erkan Avseren		(substituted on) 82'
FW	14	(Nigeria) Christopher Ohen		(substituted on) 75'
MF	15	(Turkey) Nihat Kahveci		(substituted on) 65'
MF	16	(Turkey) Hikmet Çapanoğlu
DF	17	(Turkey) Rahim Zafer
DF	18	(Turkey) Serdar Topraktepe
Manager:
(Germany) Karl-Heinz Feldkamp

GK	1	(Brazil) Cláudio Taffarel
RB	2	(Turkey) Fatih Akyel
CB	3	(Turkey) Bülent Korkmaz
CB	4	(Romania) Gheorghe Popescu
CM	5	(Turkey) Ümit Davala		(substituted off) 89'
CF	6	(Turkey) Ergün Penbe		(substituted off) 83'
CM	7	(Turkey) Okan Buruk		(substituted off) 85'
CM	8	(Turkey) Suat Kaya
CF	9	(Turkey) Hakan Şükür
CM	10	(Turkey) Emre Belözoğlu	(yellow card) 28'
LB	11	(Turkey) Hakan Ünsal	(yellow card) 30'
Substitutes:
GK	12	(Turkey) Kerem İnan
MF	13	(Turkey) Burak Akdiş
MF	14	(Turkey) Tugay Kerimoğlu		(substituted on) 83'
DF	15	(Turkey) Vedat İnceefe		(substituted on) 85'
DF	16	(Turkey) Tolunay Kafkas
MF	17	(Turkey) Ufuk Talay		(substituted on) 89'
Manager:
(Turkey) Fatih Terim

Match officials

- Assistant referees:
  - Turgay Güdü (Trabzon)
  - Mehmet Kaya (Istanbul)
- Fourth official: Metin Tokat (Ankara)

Match rules

- 90 minutes.
- 30 minutes of extra-time if necessary.
- Penalty shoot-out if scores still level.
- Seven named substitutes.
- Maximum of three substitutions.
