= 2000 Turkish Cup final =

- Event: 1999–2000 Turkish Cup
Antalyaspor	Galatasaray
3	5
- Date: May 3, 2000
- Venue: Atatürk Stadium, Diyarbakır
- Referee: Metin Tokat (Ankara)
- Attendance: 14,000
- Weather: Sunny

The 2000 Turkish Cup final was a football match played on 3 May 2000 at the Atatürk Stadium in Diyarbakır. It was the final and deciding match of the 1999–2000 Türkiye Kupası.

== Match details ==
3 May 2000
15:00 CEST

Antalyaspor	3 – 5 (a.e.t.)	Galatasaray
Gürsel 40'; Demiray 70'; Çakır 94'	(Report)	Davala 13'; Márcio Mixirica 72'; Ünsal 99'; Yozgatlı 112'; Şükür 113'

Atatürk Stadium, Diyarbakır
Attendance: 14,000
Referee: Metin Tokat (Ankara)

Antalyaspor
Galatasaray

GK	1	(Turkey) Adnan Karahan
DF	2	(Turkey) Burhan Saatçioğlu
DF	3	(Turkey) Nuri Kamburoğlu
DF	4	(Turkey) Gocho Guintchev
DF	5	(Turkey) Kamil Çakır	(yellow card) 58'
MF	6	(Turkey) Zafer Demiray
MF	7	(Turkey) Mustafa Gürsel	(yellow card) 72'
MF	8	(Turkey) Fazlı Ulusal		(substituted off) 63'
MF	9	(Turkey) Şenol Yavaş		(substituted off) 97'
FW	10	(Bosnia and Herzegovina) Vedin Musić
FW	11	(Turkey) Dursun Karaman (C)		(substituted off) 65'
Substitutes:
GK	12	(Turkey) Cüneyt Aydoğan
DF	13	(Turkey) Ahmet Sönmez		(substituted on) 97'
DF	14	(Turkey) Toprak Kırtoğlu
MF	15	(Turkey) Faruk Karaca
MF	16	(Germany) Maurizio Gaudino		(substituted on) 65'
FW	17	(Belgium) Mame Adama Gueye		(substituted on) 63'
FW	18	(Turkey) Muhamet Akyaycı
Manager:
(Turkey) Metin Ünal

GK	1	(Turkey) Kerem İnan
RB	2	(Turkey) Ümit Davala
CB	3	(Brazil) Capone	(yellow card) 71'
CB	4	(Romania) Gheorghe Popescu		(substituted off) 95'
LB	5	(Turkey) Ahmet Yıldırım
RM	6	(Turkey) Arif Erdem		(substituted off) 46'
CM	7	(Turkey) Okan Buruk
CM	8	(Turkey) Ergün Penbe
LM	9	(Turkey) Hakan Şükür
CF	10	(Romania) Gheorghe Hagi	(yellow card) 74'	(substituted off) 80'
CF	11	(Turkey) Hakan Ünsal
Substitutes:
GK	12	(Turkey) Mehmet Bölükbaşı
DF	13	(Turkey) Mehmet Yozgatlı		(substituted on) 95'
DF	14	(Turkey) Fatih Akyel
MF	15	(Turkey) Eyüp Kaymakçı
MF	16	(Turkey) Hasan Şaş		(substituted on) 80'
MF	17	(Turkey) Emrah Eren
MF	18	(Brazil) Márcio Mixirica		(substituted on) 46'
Manager:
(Turkey) Fatih Terim

Match officials

- Assistant referees:
  - Turgay Güdü
  - Cengiz Akyüz
- Fourth official: İbrahim Aksoy

Match rules

- 90 minutes.
- 30 minutes of extra-time if necessary.
- Penalty shoot-out if scores still level.
- Seven named substitutes.
- Maximum of three substitutions.
