= 2014 Turkish Cup final =

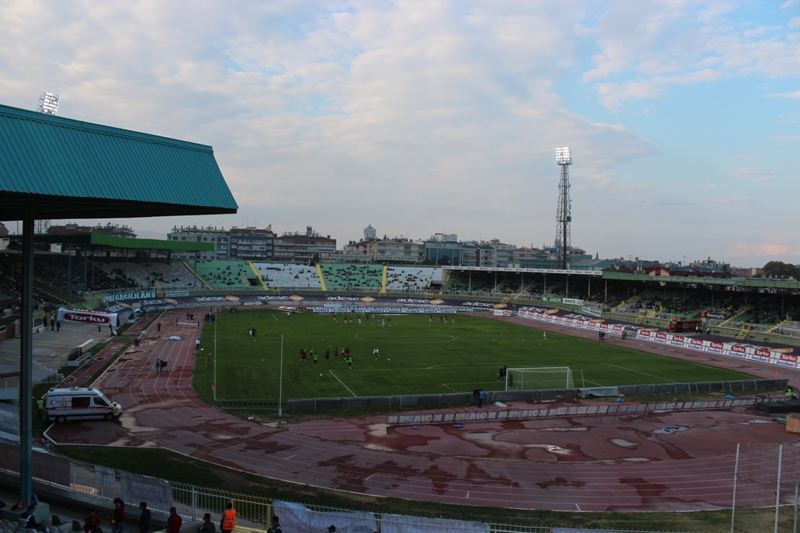
- Atatürk Stadium in Konya hosted the final.
- Event: 2013–14 Turkish Cup
Galatasaray	Eskişehirspor
1	0
- Date: 7 May 2014
- Venue: Atatürk Stadium, Konya
- Man of the Match: Wesley Sneijder
- Referee: Hüseyin Göçek
- Attendance: 22,456

The 2014 Turkish Cup final was a football match that decided the winner of the 2013–14 Turkish Cup, the 52nd edition of Turkey's primary football cup. The match was played on 7 May 2014 at the Atatürk Stadium in Konya between Galatasaray and Eskişehirspor.

Galatasaray won 1–0 for their first Turkish Cup title.

== Match ==
=== Details ===
7 May 2014
20:00 TRT

Galatasaray	1–0	Eskişehirspor
Sneijder 70'	Report

Atatürk Stadium, Konya
Attendance: 22,456
Referee: Hüseyin Göçek

Galatasaray	Eskişehirspor

GK	25	(Uruguay) Fernando Muslera
RB	26	(Turkey) Semih Kaya
CB	22	(Turkey) Hakan Balta
CB	21	(Cameroon) Aurélien Chedjou
LB	15	(Brazil) Alex Telles
CM	8	(Turkey) Selçuk İnan
CM	10	(Netherlands) Wesley Sneijder	(yellow card) 49'
CM	3	(Brazil) Felipe Melo
AM	91	(Turkey) Sabri Sarıoğlu (c)
LW	26	(Turkey) Yekta Kurtuluş		(substituted off) 82'
CF	17	(Turkey) Burak Yılmaz
Substitutes:
GK	86	(Turkey) Ufuk Ceylan
DF	27	(Ivory Coast) Emmanuel Eboué
DF	28	(Turkey) Koray Günter
MF	4	(Turkey) Hamit Altıntop		(substituted on) 82'
MF	6	(Turkey) Ceyhun Gülselam
MF	52	(Turkey) Emre Çolak
FW	19	(Turkey) Umut Bulut
Manager:
(Italy) Roberto Mancini

GK	25	(Belgium) Ruud Boffin
RB	38	(Turkey) Tarık Çamdal
CB	5	(Turkey) Sezgin Coşkun (c)	(yellow card) 53'
CB	30	(Ghana) Jerry Akaminko	(yellow card) 73'
LB	65	(Turkey) Kamil Ahmet Çörekçi
CM	60	(Turkey) Özgür Çek		(substituted off) 46'
CM	50	(Turkey) Hürriyet Gücer		(substituted off) 78'
RW	12	(Nigeria) Raheem Lawal
LW	10	(Turkey) Erkan Zengin
CF	80	(Chile) Cristóbal Jorquera
CF	15	(Senegal) Diomansy Kamara
Substitutes:
GK	1	(Turkey) Kayacan Erdoğan
DF	4	(Brazil) Dedê
DF	6	(Turkey) Serol Demirhan
DF	8	(Turkey) Erman Kılıç		(substituted on) 78'
MF	19	(Turkey) Erkut Şentürk
MF	35	(Turkey) Aytaç Kara
FW	77	(Turkey) Necati Ateş		(substituted on) 46'
Manager:
(Turkey) Ertuğrul Sağlam

Assistant referees:
Orkun Aktaş
Yasin Kol
Fourth official:
Mete Kalkavan

Match rules

- 90 minutes
- 30 minutes of extra time if necessary
- Penalty shoot-out if scores still level
- Twelve named substitutes
- Maximum of five substitutions, with a sixth allowed in extra time (Note: Each team will be given only three opportunities to make substitutions, with a fourth opportunity in extra time, excluding substitutions made at half-time, before the start of extra time and at half-time in extra time.)
