= 2004–05 Turkish Cup =

Türkiye Kupası
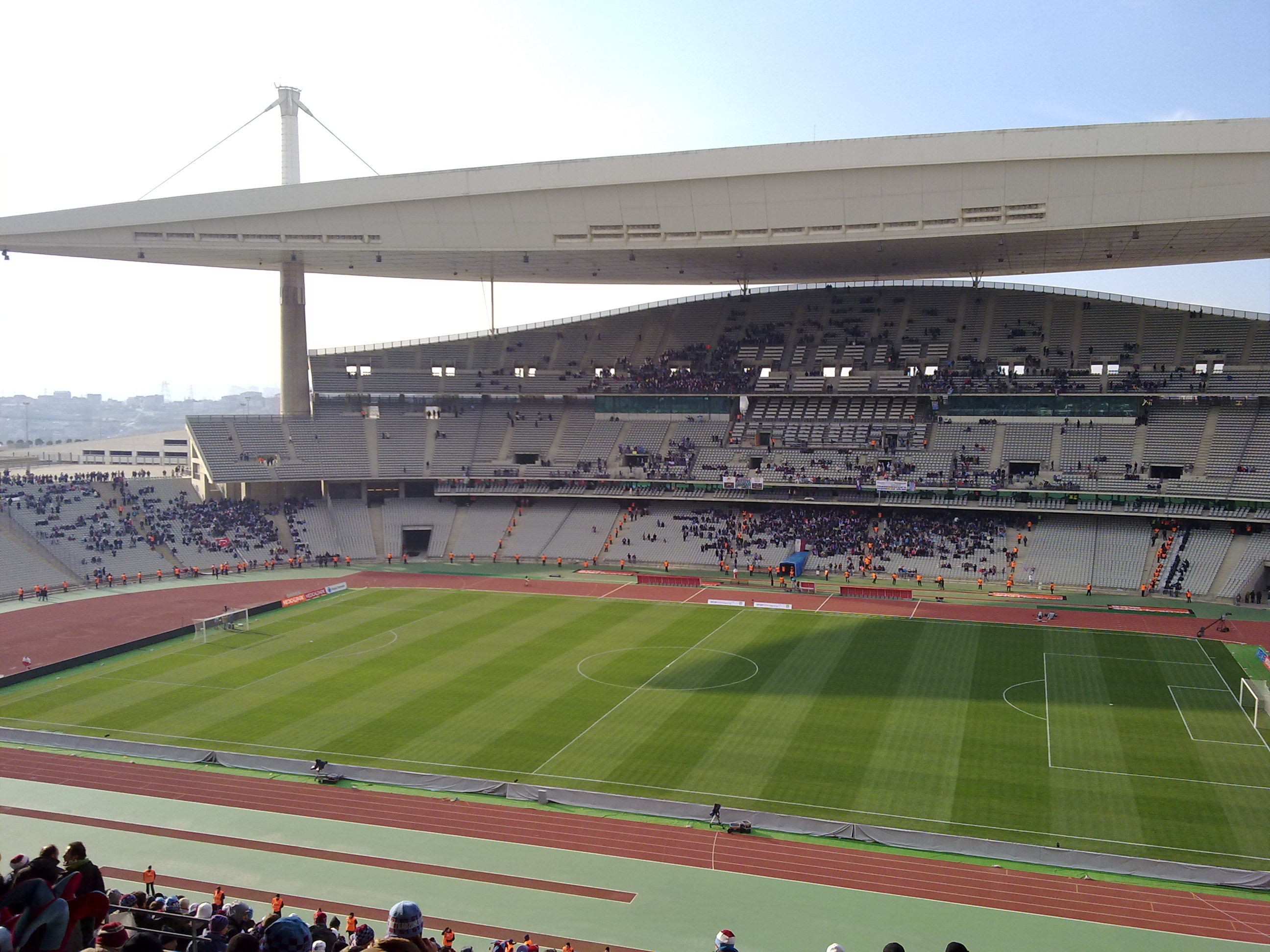
- Atatürk Olympic Stadium

Tournament details
- Country: Turkey
- Teams: 72

Final positions
- Champions: Galatasaray (14th title)
- Runners-up: Fenerbahçe

Tournament statistics
- Top goal scorer(s): Alex; Hakan Şükür; Necati Ateş; Ersen Martin; Timuçin Bayazıt; Samuel Johnson (4 goals each)

The 2004–05 Turkish Cup was the 43rd edition of the annual tournament that determined the association football Super League (Süper Lig) Turkish Cup (Turkish: Türkiye Kupası) champion under the auspices of the Turkish Football Federation (Turkish: Türkiye Futbol Federasyonu; TFF). Galatasaray successfully contested over their archrivals Fenerbahçe 5–1 in the final. The results of the tournament also determined which clubs would be promoted or relegated.

== Qualifying round ==
Team 1	Score	Team 2
Kocaelispor	4–0	Çanakkale Dardanelspor
Kayseri Erciyesspor	5–1	Orduspor
Altay	1–0	İzmirspor
Bursaspor	1–0	Sakaryaspor
Bucaspor	0–3	Göztepe
Antalyaspor	2–0 (aet)	Adanaspor
Sivasspor	0–1	Kayserispor
Mersin İdman Yurdu	2–0	Adana Demirspor
Adıyamanspor	4–0	Elazığspor
İstanbul BB	1–3	Fatih Karagümrük
Uşakspor	3–1	Nazilli Belediyespor
Vestel Manisaspor	4–3 (aet)	Karşıyaka
Karabükspor	2–0	Yimpaş Yozgatspor
Hatayspor	1–4	Mardinspor
Sarıyer	5–1	Kartalspor
Türk Telekom	1–4	Ankaraspor
Gaziantep BB	Bye	

== First round ==
Team 1	Score	Team 2
Diyarbakırspor	4–2 (aet)	Mersin İdman Yurdu
Ankaraspor	1–2 (aet)	Denizlispor
Göztepe	0–1	Beşiktaş
Konyaspor	4–0	Altay
Uşakspor	2–6	Fenerbahçe
Kayserispor	2–1	Gençlerbirliği
Antalyaspor	1–4	Trabzonspor
Ankaragücü	4–0	Vestel Manisaspor
Kayseri Erciyesspor	3–2 (aet)	Akçaabat Sebatspor
Adıyamanspor	2–4	Gaziantepspor
Galatasaray	3–0	Kardemir Karabükspor
Mardinspor	4–2	Sarıyer
Çaykur Rizespor	1–0	Kocaelispor
Fatih Karagümrük	0–3	Samsunspor
Gaziantep BB	2–3	Malatyaspor
Bursaspor	3–1	İstanbulspor

== Second round ==
Team 1	Score	Team 2
Mardinspor	2–2 (3–4 p)	Kayserispor
Fenerbahçe	3–2	Ankaragücü
Beşiktaş	1–3	Konyaspor
Trabzonspor	2–0	Malatyaspor
Kayseri Erciyesspor	1–4	Denizlispor
Diyarbakırspor	1–0	Çaykur Rizespor
Samsunspor	2–3 (aet)	Gaziantepspor
Galatasaray	1–0	Bursaspor

== Bracket ==
Quarter-finals
Diyarbakırspor	0
Galatasaray	1
Trabzonspor	3
Gaziantepspor	0
Denizlispor (p)	1 (5)
Konyaspor	1 (4)
Fenerbahçe	4
Kayserispor	0

Semi-finals
Galatasaray (p)	1 (4)
Trabzonspor	1 (2)
Fenerbahçe (p)	1 (4)
Denizlispor	1 (3)

Final
Galatasaray	5
Fenerbahçe	1

== Quarter-finals ==
Team 1	Score	Team 2
Diyarbakırspor	0–1	Galatasaray
Denizlispor	1–1 (5–4 p)	Konyaspor
Trabzonspor	3–0	Gaziantepspor
Fenerbahçe	4–0	Kayserispor

== Semi-finals ==
=== Summary table ===
Team 1	Score	Team 2
Galatasaray	1–1 (4–2 p)	Trabzonspor
Fenerbahçe	1–1 (4–3 p)	Denizlispor

=== Matches ===
20 April 2005 Semi-final	Galatasaray	1–1 (a.e.t.) (4–2 p)	Trabzonspor	Istanbul, Turkey
20:00 EEST (UTC+03)	Necati 88'	Report	Fatih T. 57'	Stadium: Ali Sami Yen Stadium; Referee: İsmet Arzuman
	Penalties
	Ergün (penalty scored); Hasan K. (penalty scored); Necati Ateş (penalty scored); Sabri (penalty missed); Hasan Ş. (penalty scored)		(penalty scored) İbrahim; (penalty missed) Mehmet; (penalty missed) Szymkowiak; (penalty scored) Celaleddin

21 April 2005 Semi-final	Fenerbahçe	1–1 (a.e.t.) (4–3 p)	Denizlispor	Istanbul, Turkey
20:03 EEST (UTC+03)	Fábio Luciano 110'	Report	Fatih E. 104'	Stadium: Şükrü Saracoğlu Stadium; Referee: Selçuk Dereli
	Penalties
	Anelka (penalty missed); Alex (penalty scored); Mert (penalty scored); Önder (penalty scored); Mehmet (penalty scored)		(penalty scored) Kratochvíl; (penalty scored) Abrahám; (penalty missed) Fatih E. (penalty missed) Güven; (penalty scored) Ersen

== Final ==
11 May 2005 Final	Galatasaray	5–1	Fenerbahçe	Istanbul, Turkey
21:00 EEST (UTC+03)	Ribéry 15'; Necati 23'; Hakan 36', 71', 88'	Report	Luciano 40'	Stadium: Atatürk Olympic Stadium; Attendance: 17,000; Referee: Serdar Tatlı; Man of the Match: Hakan Şükür
