= 2011 Turkish Cup final =

- Event: 2010–11 Turkish Cup
Beşiktaş	İstanbul B.B.
2	2
- Beşiktaş won 4–3 on penalties.
- Date: 11 May 2011
- Venue: Kadir Has Stadium, Kayseri
- Man of the Match: Ricardo Quaresma
- Referee: Yunus Yıldırım
- Attendance: 28,000
- Weather: Cloudy

The 2011 Turkish Cup final was the 49th final match of the Turkish Cup. The match took place on 11 May 2011, at Kadir Has Stadium in Kayseri. The match was played between 8 time winners Beşiktaş and first time finalists İstanbul B.B. The referee of the match was Yunus Yıldırım.

Because of its current situation in the 2010–11 Süper Lig, Beşiktaş entered the final looking to secure a berth to 2011–12 UEFA Europa League next year as well as winning its 9th cup in team history. İstanbul B.B., which showed superiority towards Beşiktaş in the Süper Lig, played in the Turkish Cup final for the first time in their history.

After normal time and extra time ended on a 2–2 draw, Beşiktaş won the penalty shootout 4–3 and won its 9th Turkish Cup. By winning, Beşiktaş secured a berth in the play-off round of the UEFA Europa League.

On 10 June 2013 UEFA officially opened up disciplinary proceedings against Beşiktaş in regard to match-fixing in the 2011 Turkish Cup final.

== Background ==
Beşiktaş reached the Turkish Cup final for the 15th time in their history. Previously winning the cup 8 times, Beşiktaş entered as the favored team. İstanbul B.B., on the other hand, was entering the final for the first time in their history. İstanbul B.B.'s best performance in the Turkish Cup was in the 2009-10 Turkish Cup season, when they reached the quarter-finals.

In the 2010–11 Süper Lig, İstanbul B.B. showed superiority against Beşiktaş, winning 2–0 at İnönü and 2–1 at Atatürk Olympic Stadium. However Beşiktaş had amassed more points than İstanbul B.B., with 50 points while İstanbul B.B. had only 41 points.

Beşiktaş started the 2010–11 Turkish Cup in the play-off round, defeating Mersin İdmanyurdu 3–0. In the group stage, Beşiktaş was placed in group B with Gaziantep B.B., Trabzonspor, Konya Torku Şekerspor and Manisaspor. Beşiktaş won the group and proceeded to the quarter-finals where they defeated Gaziantep B.B. 5-0 and 3-0 respectively. In the semi-finals, Beşiktaş defeated Gaziantepspor with 3–0 and 2–2 scores, thus earning a berth in the final.

== Match details ==
11 May 2011
20:00 EEST

Beşiktaş	2–2 (a.e.t.)	İstanbul B.B.
Quaresma 33'; Sivok 78'	Report	İbrahim 53' (pen.); Gökhan 68'
Penalties
Almeida (penalty scored); Fernandes (penalty scored); Aurélio (penalty scored); Hilbert (penalty missed); Simão (penalty scored)	4–3	(penalty missed) Cihan; (penalty scored) Ekrem E. (penalty scored) Gökhan; (penalty scored) Holmén; (penalty missed) Metin

Kadir Has Stadium, Kayseri
Attendance: 28,000
Referee: Yunus Yıldırım

Beşiktaş
İstanbul B.B.

GK	1	(Turkey) Rüştü Reçber
RB	17	(Austria) Ekrem Dağ	(yellow card) 13'
CB	6	(Czech Republic) Tomáš Sivok
CB	18	(Turkey) Necip Uysal
LB	3	(Turkey) İsmail Köybaşı
CM	55	(Turkey) Mehmet Aurélio
CM	14	(Spain) Guti (c)		(substituted off) 105'
RW	7	(Portugal) Ricardo Quaresma	(yellow card) 75'
AM	4	(Portugal) Manuel Fernandes
LW	31	(Portugal) Simão
CF	13	(Brazil) Bobô		(substituted off) 56'
Substitutes:
GK	99	(Turkey) Cenk Gönen
DF	9	(Germany) Roberto Hilbert		(substituted in) 105'
DF	44	(Turkey) Erhan Güven
DF	77	(Turkey) Rıdvan Şimşek
DF	92	(Turkey) Furkan Şeker
MF	26	(Turkey) Onur Bayramoğlu
FW	34	(Portugal) Hugo Almeida		(substituted in) 56'
Manager:
(Turkey) Tayfur Havutçu

GK	1	(Bosnia and Herzegovina) Kenan Hasagić
RB	20	(Turkey) Cihan Haspolatlı
CB	3	(Turkey) Metin Depe	(yellow card) 45'
CB	2	(Turkey) Can Arat
LB	17	(Turkey) Ekrem Ekşioğlu (c)
DM	21	(Turkey) Mahmut Tekdemir	(yellow card) 62'
RM	53	(Turkey) Rızvan Şahin
CM	23	(Sweden) Samuel Holmén	(yellow card) 120'
LM	11	(Turkey) İbrahim Akın		(substituted off) 83'
CF	18	(Cameroon) Hervé Tum		(substituted off) 56'
CF	12	(Turkey) İskender Alın		(substituted off) 105'
Substitutes:
GK	61	(Turkey) Oğuzhan Bahadır
DF	28	(Poland) Marcin Kuś
DF	81	(Turkey) Gökhan Süzen		(substituted off) 83'
MF	6	(Turkey) Efe İnanç
MF	8	(Turkey) Zeki Korkmaz
FW	39	(Turkey) Gökhan Ünal		(substituted off) 56'
FW	88	(Turkey) Tevfik Köse		(substituted off) 105'
Manager:
(Turkey) Abdullah Avcı

Man of the match:
Ricardo Quaresma (Beşiktaş)
Assistant referees:
Baki Tuncay Akkın
Volkan Narinç
Fourth referee:
Barış Şimşek

== See also ==
- 2010–11 Turkish Cup
- 2011 Turkish Super Cup
