= 1998 Atatürk Cup =

- Event: Atatürk Cup
| Beşiktaş | Fenerbahçe |
| 0 | 2 |
- Date: 10 November 1998
- Venue: 19 Mayıs Stadium, Ankara
- Referee: Oğuz Sarvan (Turkey)

The 1998 Atatürk Cup was a single football match contested between 1998 Presidential Cup winners Beşiktaş and 1998 Prime Minister's Cup winners Fenerbahçe. Fenerbahçe won the game 2–0.

== Match details ==
| Beşiktaş | 0 – 2 | Fenerbahçe |
|---|---|---|
| | | 38' Tayfun Korkut; 56' John Moshoeu |

| BEŞİKTAŞ: |
| 1 | (Turkey) Ekrem Köse |
| 2 | (Turkey) Savaş Kaya |
| 3 | (Turkey) Mutlu Topçu |
| 4 | (Turkey) Hikmet Çapanoğlu |
| 5 | (Turkey) Alpay Özalan |
| 6 | (Turkey) Rahim Zafer |
| 7 | (Turkey) Erkan Avseren |
| 8 | (Turkey) Nihat Kahveci |
| 9 | (Turkey) Ertuğrul Sağlam |
| 10 | (Turkey) Yasin Sülün |
| 11 | (Turkey) Serdar Topraktepe | (substituted off) 65' |
Substitution:
| 14 | (Turkey) Aydın Tuna | (substituted on) 65' |
Manager:
(Wales) John Toshack

| FENERBAHÇE: |
| 1 | (Turkey) Murat Şahin |
| 2 | (Turkey) Mustafa Doğan |
| 3 | (Turkey) Uche Okechukwu |
| 4 | (Denmark) Jes Høgh |
| 5 | (Turkey) Erol Bulut |
| 6 | (Portugal) Dimas Teixeira | (substituted off) 30' |
| 7 | (Turkey) Tayfun Korkut |
| 8 | (Turkey) Murat Yakın | (substituted off) 75' |
| 9 | (Bosnia and Herzegovina) Elvir Bolić | (substituted off) 86' |
| 10 | (South Africa) John Moshoeu |
| 11 | (Turkey) Metin Diyadin |
Substitutions:
| 16 | (Turkey) İlker Yağcıoğlu | (substituted on) 30' |
| 15 | (Turkey) Kemalettin Şentürk | (substituted on) 75' |
| 18 | (Turkey) Faruk Yiğit | (substituted on) 86' |
Manager:
(Germany) Joachim Löw
