= 1996 Turkish Cup final =

The 1996 Turkish Cup final was a football match played over two legs in April 1996. It was the final and deciding match of the 1995–96 Turkish Cup.

== First leg ==
11 April 1996
19:00

| Galatasaray | 1 – 0 | Fenerbahçe |
|---|---|---|
| Saunders 5' | Report |

Ali Sami Yen Stadium, Istanbul
Referee: Ahmet Çakar

| GALATASARAY: |
| 1 | (United States) Brad Friedel |
| 2 | (Netherlands) Ulrich van Gobbel |
| 3 | (Turkey) Bülent Korkmaz |
| 4 | (Turkey) Feti Okuroğlu | (yellow card) 35' |
| 5 | (Turkey) Tugay Kerimoğlu | (yellow card) 60' |
| 6 | (Turkey) Arif Erdem |
| 7 | (Wales) Dean Saunders | | (substituted off) 70' |
| 8 | (Turkey) Evren Nuri Turhan | (yellow card) 65' |
| 9 | (Turkey) Hakan Şükür |
| 10 | (Turkey) Ufuk Talay | | (substituted off) 60' |
| 11 | (Turkey) Ergün Penbe | | (substituted off) 80' |
Substitutes
| 12 | (Turkey) Hayrettin Demirbaş |
| 13 | (Turkey) Mert Korkmaz | | (substituted on) 70' |
| 14 | (Turkey) İlyas Kahraman | | (substituted on) 80' |
| 15 | (Turkey) Ceyhun Eriş |
| 16 | (Turkey) Hakan Ünsal | | (substituted on) 60' |
Manager:
(Scotland) Graeme Souness

| FENERBAHÇE: |
| 1 | (Turkey) Rüştü Reçber | (yellow card) 4' |
| 2 | (Turkey) İlker Yağcıoğlu | (yellow card) 84' |
| 3 | (Nigeria) Uche Okechukwu |
| 4 | (Denmark) Jes Høgh |
| 5 | (Turkey) Oğuz Çetin | (yellow card) 72' |
| 6 | (Turkey) Erol Bulut | | (substituted off) 60' |
| 7 | (Turkey) Tayfun Korkut |
| 8 | (Turkey) Kemalettin Şentürk | (yellow card) 17' | (substituted off) 60' |
| 9 | (Bosnia and Herzegovina) Elvir Bolić |
| 10 | (England) Dalian Atkinson |
| 11 | (Turkey) Bülent Uygun |
Substitutes
| 12 | (Turkey) Engin İpekoğlu |
| 13 | (Turkey) Aygün Taşkıran | | (substituted on) 60' |
| 14 | (Turkey) Halil İbrahim Kara | | (substituted on) 60' |
| 15 | (Turkey) Aykut Kocaman |
| 16 | (Turkey) Saffet Akbaş |
Manager:
(Brazil) Carlos Alberto Parreira

Man of the Match:

Referee:
(Turkey) Ahmet Çakar
Assistant Referees:
(Turkey) Turgay Güdü
(Turkey) Akif Uğurdur
Fourth Referee:
(Turkey) Serdar Çakır

== Second leg ==
24 April 1996
19:00

| Fenerbahçe | 1 – 1 (a.e.t.) | Galatasaray |
|---|---|---|
| Aykut 34' | Report | Saunders 116' |

Şükrü Saracoğlu Stadium, Istanbul
Referee: Ayhan Yücebilgiç

| FENERBAHÇE: |
| 1 | (Turkey) Rüştü Reçber |
| 2 | (Turkey) İlker Yağcıoğlu | (yellow card) 48' |
| 3 | (Nigeria) Uche Okechukwu |
| 4 | (Denmark) Jes Høgh |
| 5 | (Turkey) Oğuz Çetin | | (substituted off) 106' |
| 6 | (Turkey) Erol Bulut |
| 7 | (Turkey) Tayfun Korkut |
| 8 | (Turkey) Kemalettin Şentürk | | (substituted off) 40' |
| 9 | (Bosnia and Herzegovina) Elvir Bolić |
| 10 | (Turkey) Bülent Uygun |
| 11 | (Turkey) Aykut Kocaman | | (substituted off) 70' |
Subsitues
| 12 | (Turkey) Engin İpekoğlu |
| 13 | (Turkey) Tarık Daşgün | | (substituted on) 106' |
| 14 | (Turkey) Halil İbrahim Kara |
| 15 | (England) Dalian Atkinson | | (substituted on) 70' |
| 16 | (Turkey) Saffet Akbaş | | (substituted on) 40' |
Manager:
(Brazil) Carlos Alberto Parreira

| GALATASARAY: |
| 1 | (United States) Brad Friedel |
| 2 | (Netherlands) Ulrich van Gobbel | (yellow card) 62' |
| 3 | (Turkey) Bülent Korkmaz |
| 4 | (Turkey) Feti Okuroğlu |
| 5 | (Turkey) Tugay Kerimoğlu |
| 6 | (Turkey) Arif Erdem | | (substituted off) 65' |
| 7 | (Wales) Dean Saunders |
| 8 | (Turkey) Hakan Ünsal |
| 9 | (Turkey) Hakan Şükür | (yellow card) 43' |
| 10 | (Turkey) Suat Kaya | (yellow card) 42' | (substituted off) 115' |
| 11 | (Turkey) Ergün Penbe | | (substituted off) 83' |
Substitutes
| 12 | (Turkey) Hayrettin Demirbaş |
| 13 | (Turkey) Mert Korkmaz |
| 14 | (Turkey) Okan Buruk | | (substituted on) 65' |
| 15 | (Turkey) Ufuk Talay | | (substituted on) 115' |
| 16 | (Turkey) İlyas Kahraman | | (substituted on) 83' |
Manager:
(Scotland) Graeme Souness

Man of the match:

Referee:
(Turkey) Ayhan Yücebilgiç
Assistant Referee:
(Turkey) Münir Takpak
(Turkey) Ünal Salcıoğlu
Fourth Assistant:
(Turkey) Sadık İlhan

== Aftermath ==
The iconic image of Souness planting the Galatasaray flag after winning the final against Fenerbahçe drew comparisons with Turkish hero Ulubatlı Hasan, who was killed as he planted the Ottoman flag at the end of the Siege of Constantinople. This earned Souness the nickname "Ulubatlı Souness".
