= 2005 Turkish Cup final =

- Event: 2004–05 Turkish Cup
Galatasaray	Fenerbahçe
5	1
- Date: 11 May 2005
- Venue: Atatürk Olympic Stadium, Istanbul
- Man of the Match: Hakan Şükür (Galatasaray)
- Referee: Serdar Tatlı (Turkey)
- Weather: Sunny

The 2005 Turkish Cup final was a football match played on 11 May 2005 at the Atatürk Olympic Stadium in Istanbul between Galatasaray and Fenerbahçe. It was the final and deciding match of the 2004–05 Türkiye Kupası (Turkish Cup).

Galatasaray won the match 5-1 for their 14th title.

== Match details ==
11 May 2005
20:00 CEST

Galatasaray	5 – 1	Fenerbahçe
Ribéry 15'; Ateş 23'; Şükür 36', 71', 88'	(Report)	Luciano 40'

Atatürk Olympic Stadium, Istanbul
Attendance: 71,061
Referee: Serdar Tatlı

Galatasaray

Fenerbahçe

GALATASARAY:
GK	1	(Colombia) Faryd Mondragón
DF	19	(Turkey) Cihan Haspolatlı
DF	2	(Croatia) Stjepan Tomas
DF	4	(Cameroon) Rigobert Song
DF	5	(Turkey) Orhan Ak	(yellow card) 40'	(substituted off) 46'
MF	67	(Turkey) Ergün Penbe
MF	18	(Turkey) Ayhan Akman	(yellow card) 44'
MF	28	(France) Franck Ribéry		(substituted off) 52'
MF	8	(Brazil) Flávio Conceição
FW	25	(Turkey) Necati Ateş		(substituted off) 59'
FW	9	(Turkey) Hakan Şükür (C)	(yellow card) 57'
Substitutes:
GK	12	(Turkey) Aykut Erçetin
DF	3	(Turkey) Bülent Korkmaz
DF	55	(Turkey) Sabri Sarıoğlu		(substituted on) 52'
MF	11	(Turkey) Hasan Şaş		(substituted on) 59'
MF	33	(Turkey) Uğur Uçar		(substituted on) 46'
FW	6	(Turkey) Arif Erdem
FW	58	(Turkey) Hasan Kabze
Manager:
(Romania) Gheorghe Hagi

FENERBAHÇE:
GK	34	(Turkey) Rüştü Reçber
DF	2	(Brazil) Fabio Luciano
DF	30	(Turkey) Serkan Balcı	(yellow card) 86'
DF	24	(Turkey) Deniz Barış
DF	19	(Turkey) Önder Turacı
MF	67	(Turkey) Selçuk Şahin		(substituted off) 46'
MF	15	(Turkey) Mehmet Aurélio
MF	20	(Brazil) Alex	(yellow card) 66'
MF	10	(Turkey) Tuncay (C)
FW	9	(Turkey) Serhat Akın		(substituted off) 70'
FW	11	(Brazil) Marcio Nobre
Substitutes:
GK	1	(Turkey) Volkan Demirel
DF	16	(Turkey) Mahmut Hanefi Erdoğdu
MF	8	(Turkey) Murat Hacıoğlu
MF	27	(Turkey) Kemal Aslan
MF	7	(Turkey) Mehmet Yozgatlı		(substituted on) 70'
FW	17	(Netherlands) Pierre van Hooijdonk		(substituted on) 56'
FW	29	(Turkey) Semih Şentürk
Manager:
(Germany) Christoph Daum

Man of the match:
Hakan Şükür (Galatasaray)
Referee:
(Turkey) Serdar Tatlı
Assistant referees:
(Turkey) Ekrem Kan
(Turkey) Erhan Sönmez
Fourth referee:
(Turkey) Fırat Aydınus
