= Mehmet Bölükbaşı =

Turkish footballer

Personal information
- Full name: Mehmet Bölükbaşı
- Date of birth: 24 March 1978 (age 48)
- Place of birth: Akçaabat, Trabzon, Turkey
- Height: 1.88 m (6 ft 2 in)
- Position: Goalkeeper

Youth career
- 1988–1996: A. Sebatspor

Senior career*
Years	Team	Apps	(Gls)
1996–97	A. Sebatspor	7	(0)
1997	A. Sebatspor	15	(0)
1998–04	Galatasaray	24	(0)
2004–05	İstanbulspor	2	(0)
2005–06	Çaykur Rizespor	1	(0)
2007	→ Boluspor (loan)	18	(0)
2007–08	Samsunspor	7	(0)
2008–09	İstanbulspor	8	(0)

International career
1998	Turkey U-21	3	(0)
- * Club domestic league appearances and goals

Mehmet Bölükbaşı (born 24 March 1978) is a Turkish goalkeeper. He is a product of A. Sebatspor youth academy. Journeyman Mehmet spent most of his professional career with the UEFA Cup winner Galatasaray after being discovered by Fatih Terim while playing in the third division. He directly found a place in first eleven, however, with the arrival of Cláudio Taffarel he could never get the chance to play regularly. He was capped for the Turkish U21 team in 1998. When he became the third choice goalkeeper for Galatasaray, he left for İstanbulspor where his career went further down. After playing for several Anatolian sides, he returned to İstanbulspor in January 2008.

== Honours ==
Galatasaray

- Süper Lig: 1997–98, 1998–99, 1999–2000, 2001–02
- Turkish Cup: 1998–99, 1999–00
- UEFA Cup: 1999–00
