= 1974–75 Turkish Cup =

Türkiye Kupası

Tournament details
- Country: Turkey
- Teams: 22

Final positions
- Champions: Beşiktaş (1st title)
- Runners-up: Fenerbahçe

Tournament statistics
- Matches played: 42
- Goals scored: 78 (1.86 per match)
- Top goal scorer(s): Tezcan Ozan (8 goals)

The 1974–75 Turkish Cup was the 13th edition of the annual tournament that determined the association football Süper Lig Turkish Cup (Turkish: Türkiye Kupası) champion under the auspices of the Turkish Football Federation (Turkish: Türkiye Futbol Federasyonu; TFF). Beşiktaş successfully contested Trabzonspor 2–1 in the final. The results of the tournament also determined which clubs would be promoted or relegated.

== Quarter-finals ==
Team 1	Agg.	Team 2	1st leg	2nd leg
Fenerbahçe	2–3	Trabzonspor	1–1	1–2
Boluspor	3–3	Galatasaray	0–2	3–1
Bursaspor	6–3	Zonguldakspor	4–2	2–1
Şekerspor	1–3	Beşiktaş	0–1	1–2

== Semi-finals ==
Team 1	Agg.	Team 2	1st leg	2nd leg
Boluspor	1–3	Trabzonspor	1–0	0–3
Bursaspor	1–2	Beşiktaş	1–0	0–2

== Final ==
=== 1st leg ===
7 May 1975 Final	Trabzonspor	1–0	Beşiktaş	Trabzon, Turkey
16:00 EEST (UTC+03)	Kadir 58'			Stadium: Trabzon Şehir Stadium; Referee: Orhan Cebe

=== 2nd leg ===
21 May 1975 Final	Beşiktaş	2–0	Trabzonspor	Istanbul, Turkey
17:30 EEST (UTC+03)	Niko 31'; Lütfü 75'			Stadium: BJK İnönü Stadyumu; Referee: Doğan Babacan
