= Mehmet Aurélio =

Footballer (born 1977)

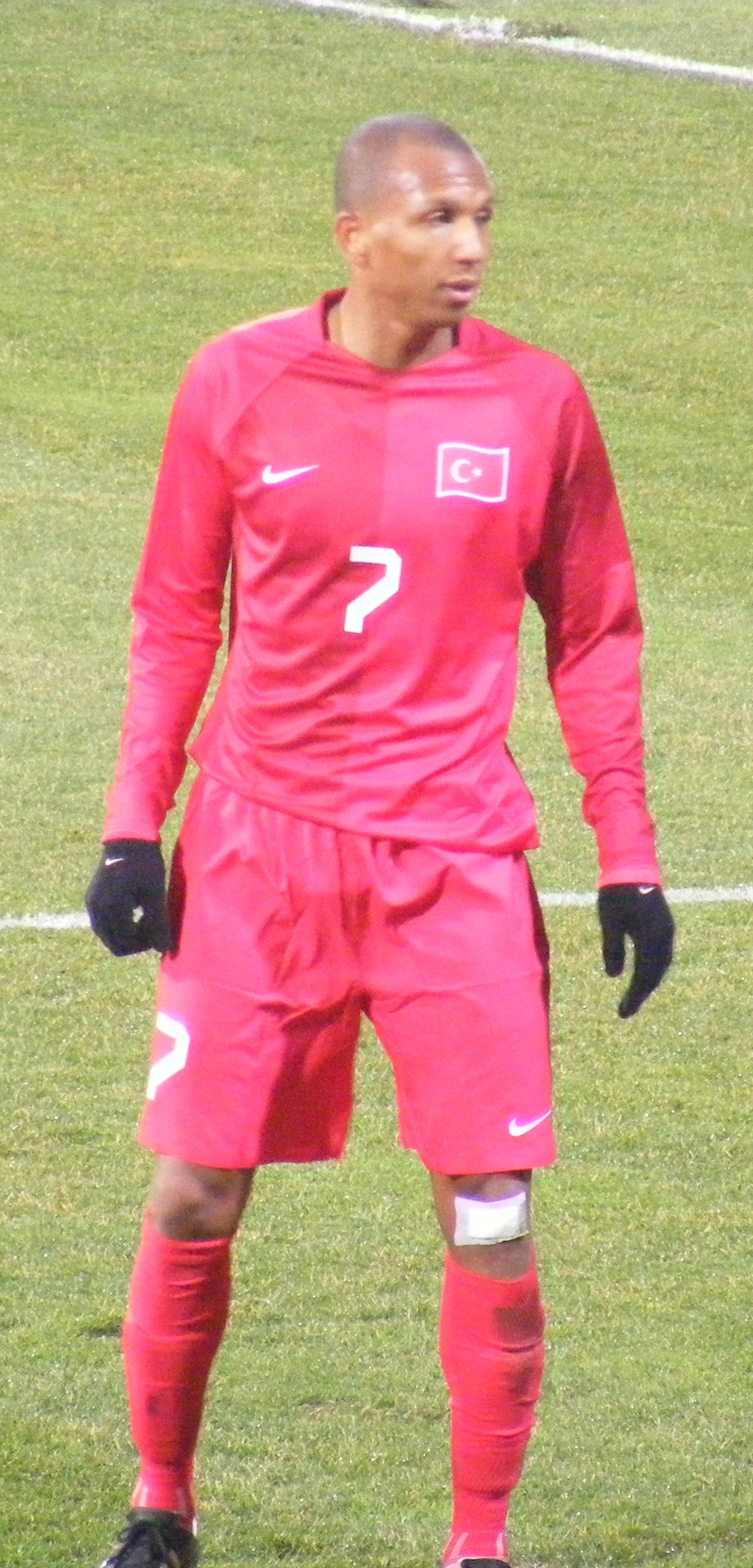
- Aurélio with Turkey in 2008

Personal information
- Full name: Mehmet Aurélio
- Birth name: Marco Aurélio Brito dos Prazeres
- Date of birth: 15 December 1977 (age 48)
- Place of birth: Rio de Janeiro, Brazil
- Height: 1.78 m (5 ft 10 in)
- Position: Defensive midfielder

Team information
- Current team: Antalyaspor (assistant manager)

Youth career
- 1993–1995: Bangu

Senior career*
Years	Team	Apps	(Gls)
1995–2001	Flamengo	123	(21)
2001	Olaria	17	(2)
2001–2003	Trabzonspor	64	(15)
2003–2008	Fenerbahçe	176	(13)
2008–2010	Betis	69	(6)
2010–2013	Beşiktaş	34	(1)
2013	Olaria	21	(0)
Total		493	(58)

International career
2006–2011	Turkey	37	(2)

Managerial career
- 2015: Kasımpaşa (assistant)
- 2016: Göztepe (assistant)
- 2016: Göztepe (caretaker)
- 2016–2018: Sakaryaspor (assistant)
- 2018–2019: Çorum FK
- 2020–2021: Fenerbahçe (assistant)
- 2024–: Antalyaspor (assistant)
- * Club domestic league appearances and goals

Mehmet Aurélio (born 15 December 1977), originally Marco Aurélio Brito dos Prazeres, is a football coach and former defensive midfielder. Formed at Flamengo, where he made over 100 appearances, Aurélio spent most of his career in Turkey, making 254 Süper Lig appearances and scoring 29 goals for Trabzonspor, Fenerbahçe and Beşiktaş, winning three league titles with the second of them. He also played two seasons in La Liga for Real Betis.

Born in Brazil, Aurélio was naturalised as a Turkish citizen and made 44 appearances for the Turkey national team between 2006 and 2011, scoring twice and reaching the semi-finals of UEFA Euro 2008. From 2015 onwards, he coached several lower-league clubs in Turkey.

== Club career ==
=== Early career ===
Born in Rio de Janeiro, Aurélio began his career at Bangu before playing for hometown club Flamengo from 1995 to 2001. He signed for Olaria in 2001 and later that year joined Trabzonspor in the Turkish Süper Lig, where he won the Turkish Cup in 2003.

=== Fenerbahçe ===
In 2003, Marco Aurélio signed for Fenerbahçe from Istanbul. He played 218 games over five years, scoring 18 goals and assisting 35. He helped them win the league in 2004, 2005 and 2007, the last of those coming in the club's centenary. He highlighted the quarter-final win over Chelsea in the UEFA Champions League in 2007–08 as a career highlight, although the English club won the tie over two legs.

=== Real Betis ===
In July 2008, Spanish La Liga club Real Betis signed Mehmet Aurélio on a three-year deal. He played 29 games and scored 4 goals in his first season – including two in a 4–2 win at Numancia on 9 November – as his team suffered relegation. From April to November 2009, he was sidelined with a right knee ligament injury.

Club owner Manuel Ruiz de Lopera described his team as the "Real Madrid of the Segunda División", but they did not achieve promotion in 2009–10. Mehmet Aurélio described his time in Seville as a low point of his career.

=== Beşiktaş and Olaria ===
In August 2010, Mehmet Aurélio returned to Istanbul, signing for Beşiktaş on a two-year deal on a free transfer. On 11 May 2011, he converted his penalty in the shootout as his team won the Turkish Cup against İstanbul BB (4–3, 2–2 after extra time). His contract expired in the summer of 2012.

Mehmet Aurélio signed with his former club Olaria on 1 March 2013, where he retired at the end of the season.

== International career ==
In July 2006, after five years of work in Turkey, Marco Aurélio was naturalised as a citizen of the country and adopted the given name Mehmet. He was immediately called up by the Turkey national football team for a friendly against Luxembourg, where he would become the first naturalised player to represent the nation.

Mehmet Aurélio started in the 1–0 win at the Stade Josy Barthel on 16 August. His debut caused controversy in Turkish society. Columnist Ergun Babahan wrote in Daily Sabah that integration was a Turkish tradition, dating back to the Devshirme abductions of Christian children by the Ottoman Empire. Chief referee Mustafa Çulcu argued with manager Fatih Terim that it was a "degradation" of the national team. Some Turkish liberals mentioned that Bulgarian-born Olympic weightlifter Naim Süleymanoğlu was welcomed by Turkish society; when people countered that Süleymanoğlu was an ethnic Turk and a Muslim, it was brought up that the Turkish constitution does not discriminate by race and religion.

On 12 September 2007, Mehmet Aurélio scored his first international goal in a 3–0 home win over Hungary in UEFA Euro 2008 qualification. At the finals in Austria and Switzerland, he played every minute of the group stage. Having been booked in the latter two games – wins against Switzerland and the Czech Republic – he was suspended for the quarter-final that his team won on penalties against Croatia in Vienna. He returned for the semi-finals, where his team lost 3–2 to Germany.

== Managerial career ==
Mehmet Aurélio returned to Turkey in April 2015 as assistant manager to Önder Özen at Kasımpaşa, later joining him at Göztepe. Following Özen's resignation, Mehmet Aurélio managed the latter club for the final seven games of the TFF First League season, debuting on 10 April 2016 with a 2–0 home win over Karşıyaka.

After a spell as assistant at Sakaryaspor, Mehmet Aurélio managed Çorumspor in the TFF Third League from September 2018 until the following January. He won 9 and drew 1 of his 18 games and his team were in 4th place.

In May 2020, Mehmet Aurélio returned to Fenerbahçe as assistant manager, graduating to technical director two years later. In May 2024, he became assistant manager at Antalyaspor to Alex, a Brazilian who was his teammate at Fenerbahçe.

== Career statistics ==
#	Date	Venue	Opponent	Score	Result	Competition
1.	12 September 2007	Istanbul, Turkey	Hungary	2–0	3–0	UEFA Euro 2008 qualifying
2.	19 November 2008	Vienna, Austria	Austria	1–1	4–2	Friendly

== Honours ==
Trabzonspor

- Turkish Cup: 2002–03

Fenerbahçe

- Süper Lig: 2003–04, 2004–05, 2006–07
- Turkish Super Cup: 2007

Beşiktaş

- Turkish Cup: 2010–11

Turkey

- UEFA European Championship bronze medalist: 2008
