= Erol Bulut =

Turkish footballer and manager

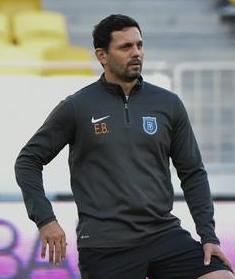

Personal information
- Full name: Erol Bulut
- Date of birth: 30 January 1975 (age 51)
- Place of birth: Bad Schwalbach, West Germany
- Height: 6 ft 0 in (1.83 m)
- Position: Left wing-back

Youth career
- 1992–1994: Eintracht Frankfurt

Senior career*
Years	Team	Apps	(Gls)
1992–1995	Eintracht Frankfurt	9	(0)
1995–1999	Fenerbahçe	110	(10)
1999–2001	Eintracht Frankfurt	7	(0)
1999–2000	→ Trabzonspor (loan)	22	(0)
2001	→ Adanaspor (loan)	9	(3)
2001–2003	Panionios	39	(4)
2003–2004	Bursaspor	17	(1)
2004–2005	1860 Munich	10	(1)
2005–2007	Olympiacos	24	(2)
2007–2009	Metalurh Donetsk	18	(1)
2009–2010	Olympiacos Volos	22	(1)
2011–2012	OFI	40	(0)
2012	Veria	12	(0)
Total		310	(23)

International career
1994–1997	Turkey U21	18	(0)

Managerial career
- 2017–2019: Yeni Malatyaspor
- 2019–2020: Alanyaspor
- 2020–2021: Fenerbahçe
- 2021–2023: Gaziantep
- 2023–2024: Cardiff City
- 2025: Antalyaspor
- * Club domestic league appearances and goals

Erol Bulut (Turkish pronunciation: [eˈɾoɫ buˈɫut]; born 30 January 1975) is a Turkish professional football manager and former player, who last coached Süper Lig club Antalyaspor.

== Club career ==
=== Football ===
Born in Bad Schwalbach, West Germany, During his career as a football player, Erol Bulut achieved notable successes. He represented Turkey in the under-21 international level. His journey began with various German clubs in his youth. In 1995, he transferred from Eintracht Frankfurt to Fenerbahçe in Turkey, where he secured the Süper Lig title in the following season. Afterward, he returned to Eintracht Frankfurt briefly in 1999 before mainly playing on loan for Turkish clubs.

Bulut continued his career trajectory, moving between various clubs. He returned to Turkey in 2003 with Bursaspor, followed by a stint at 1860 Munich in Germany. His move to Greece's Olympiacos in 2005 proved fruitful, as he won the Super League Greece and Greek Football Cup in his initial year. His contract was terminated during the second season. After subsequent trials at European clubs, he played for Ukraine's Metalurh Donetsk in 2007. From 2008–09, he joined Greece's second division club Olympiacos Volos, eventually moving to OFI in January 2011 and securing promotion to the Super League.

Bulut's playing career concluded after a second promotion with Veria in the summer of 2012. He underwent trial periods at clubs like Stoke City, Rangers, and Newcastle United.

=== Futsal ===
Bulut played futsal and became a member of the Turkey national futsal team in the UEFA Futsal Championship.

== Managerial career ==
Bulut's coaching journey began in October 2012 as a co-assistant at Kartalspor. He continued in the same role at Yeni Malatyaspor, Elazığspor, and İstanbul Başakşehir.

In September 2017, he became a head coach for the first time at Yeni Malatyaspor, a newly promoted team, successfully ensuring their place in the top-tier league. In the subsequent 2018/19 season, he guided the Anatolian club to the semi-finals of the Turkish Cup, where they were eliminated by eventual winners Galatasaray. In late April 2019, Bulut resigned with five matchdays remaining in the season.

During the 2019–20 season, he took on the role of head coach at Alanyaspor, a prominent Turkish top-tier club. Under his leadership, the team secured a fifth-place league finish and reached the Turkish Cup final. This accomplishment marked the club's first qualification for the Europa League qualification rounds.

In the following season 2020–21, Bulut returned to his initial professional playing club, Fenerbahçe, to assume the position of head coach. However, in March 2021, the club and Bulut decided to part ways. Subsequently, in May 2021, Bulut signed a three-year contract with Gaziantep, another Turkish top-tier club. However, they parted ways in January 2023.

On 3 June 2023, Bulut was appointed manager of Championship club Cardiff City. During his time at the club, he led Cardiff City to 3 derby victories, including a 2-0 win at the Cardiff City Stadium against fierce South Wales rivals Swansea City. On 4 June 2024, he signed a new two-year contract extension. However, he was sacked as manager on 22nd September 2024 following just 1 point from 6 games at the start of the 2024-25 season.

== Managerial statistics ==
As of match played 23 December 2025

Team	From	To	Record				
Team	From	To	G	W	D	L	Win %
Yeni Malatyaspor	1 October 2017	25 April 2019	69	27	19	23	39.13
Alanyaspor	17 August 2019	3 August 2020	44	23	9	12	52.27
Fenerbahçe	5 August 2020	25 March 2021	34	21	5	8	61.76
Gaziantep	20 May 2021	27 January 2023	65	21	19	25	32.31
Cardiff City	3 June 2023	22 September 2024	58	21	7	30	36.21
Antalyaspor	13 October 2025	23 December 2025	12	3	2	7	25.00
Career totals			282	116	61	105	41.13

== Honours ==
=== Player ===
Fenerbahçe

- Süper Lig: 1995–96
- Atatürk Cup: 1998

Olympiacos

- Super League Greece: 2005–06, 2006–07
- Greek Football Cup: 2005–06

Olympiacos Volos

- Football League Greece: 2009–10
