= 1999–2000 Turkish Cup =

Türkiye Kupası

Tournament details
- Country: Turkey
- Teams: 64

Final positions
- Champions: Galatasaray
- Runners-up: Antalyaspor

Tournament statistics
- Top goal scorer(s): 15 players (3 goals each)

The 1999–2000 Turkish Cup was the 38th edition of the annual tournament that determined the association football Süper Lig Turkish Cup (Turkish: Türkiye Kupası) champion under the auspices of the Turkish Football Federation (Turkish: Türkiye Futbol Federasyonu; TFF). Galatasaray successfully contested Antalyaspor in the final by 5–3 after extra time. The results of the tournament also determined which clubs would be promoted or relegated.

== First round ==
Team 1	Score	Team 2
Artvin Hopaspor	3–2	Amasyaspor
Hakkarispor	1–2	Malatya Belediyespor
Diyarbakırspor	2–0	Batman Petrolspor
Siirt Jetpa	2–0	Adıyamanspor
Doğubayazıtspor	1–2	Şanlıurfaspor
Yimpaş Yozgatspor	3–1	Sivasspor
Ceyhanspor	0–1	Mersin İdman Yurdu
Konya Endüstrispor	1–0	Gaziantep BB
MKE Kırıkkalespor	1–0	Boluspor
Asaşspor	1–2	Ankara BB
Marmaris Belediyespor	4–2	Karşıyaka
Bucaspor	1–0	Bilecikspor
Petkimspor	2–0	İzmirspor
Yeni Nazillispor	3–1	Kuşadasıspor
Beylerbeyi	1–3	Zeytinburnuspor
Kartalspor	1–0	Gebzespor
Gaziosmanpaşa	2–4	Pendikspor
Eyüpspor	2–5	Bakırköy

== Second round ==
Team 1	Score	Team 2
Siirt Jetpa	5–2	Şanlıurfaspor
Malatya Belediyespor	1–1 (1–3 p)	Elazığspor
Vanspor	4–2	Diyarbakırspor
Kartalspor	1–0	İstanbul BB
Çaykur Rizespor	5–0	Artvin Hopaspor
Kayserispor	1–0	MKE Kırıkkalespor
Ankara BB	3–2	Mersin İdman Yurdu
Yimpaş Yozgatspor	3–1	Şekerspor
Konya Endüstrispor	3–0	Bucaspor
Bakırköy	1–1 (3–1 p)	Zeytinburnuspor
Sarıyer	1–2	Pendikspor
Yeni Nazillispor	5–2	Aydınspor
Göztepe	3–2	Marmaris Belediyespor
Petkimspor	0–4	Denizlispor

== Third round ==
Team 1	Score	Team 2
Pendikspor	2–1	Fenerbahçe
Adanaspor	1–2	Samsunspor
Vanspor	1–0	Kartalspor
Elazığspor	0–5	Gaziantepspor
Erzurumspor	4–1	Denizlispor
Siirt Jetpa	2–5	Altay
Karabükspor	0–4	Kocaelispor
Kayserispor	1–2	Bursaspor
Trabzonspor	3–1	Göztepe
Çaykur Rizespor	5–6	Ankaragücü
İstanbulspor	2–0	Konya Endüstrispor
Yeni Nazillispor	5–2	Gençlerbirliği
Antalyaspor	2–0	Yimpaş Yozgatspor
Çanakkale Dardanelspor	1–0	Beşiktaş
Galatasaray	5–1	Ankara BB
Bakırköy*	w/o	Sakaryaspor

- Sakaryaspor withdrew from the tournament.

== Fourth round ==
Team 1	Score	Team 2
Çanakkale Dardanelspor	2–0	Pendikspor
Bursaspor	3–0	Vanspor
İstanbulspor	1–2	Ankaragücü
Yeni Nazillispor	0–0 (5–4 p)	Erzurumspor
Bakırköy	0–2	Antalyaspor
Gaziantepspor	4–3 (aet)	Altay
Kocaelispor	0–2	Trabzonspor
Galatasaray	2–1	Samsunspor

== Bracket ==
Quarter-finals
Ankaragücü	7
Yeni Nazillispor	0
Antalyaspor	3
Çanakkale Dardanelspor	1
Bursaspor	1
Gaziantepspor	0
Trabzonspor	1
Galatasaray	2

Semi-finals
Antalyaspor	2
Bursaspor	0
Ankaragücü	0
Galatasaray	2

Final
Antalyaspor	3
Galatasaray (a.e.t.)	5

== Quarter-finals ==
Team 1	Score	Team 2
Ankaragücü	7–0	Yeni Nazillispor
Antalyaspor	3–1	Çanakkale Dardanelspor
Bursaspor	1–0	Gaziantepspor
Trabzonspor	1–2	Galatasaray

== Semi-finals ==
=== Summary table ===
Team 1	Score	Team 2
Antalyaspor	2–0	Bursaspor
Ankaragücü	0–2	Galatasaray

=== Matches ===
16 February 2000 Semi-final	Antalyaspor	2–0	Bursaspor	Antalya
18:00 EET (UTC+02)	Zafer 51'; Fazlı 73'	Report		Stadium: Antalya Atatürk Stadium; Referee: Murat Ilgaz

16 February 2000 Semi-final	Ankaragücü	0–2	Galatasaray	Ankara
20:30 EET (UTC+02)		Report	Okan 32'; Hasan 87'	Stadium: Ankara 19 Mayıs Stadium; Referee: Erol Ersoy

== Final ==
3 May 2000 Final	Antalyaspor	3–5 (a.e.t.)	Galatasaray	Diyarbakır, Turkey
15:00 EEST (UTC+03)	Mustafa 40'; Zafer 70'; Kamil 94'	Report	Ümit 13'; Márcio 72'; Hakan Ü. 99'; Mehmet 112'; Hakan Ş. 113'	Stadium: Diyarbakır Atatürk Stadium; Attendance: 14,000; Referee: Metin Tokat
