= Ayhan Akman =

Turkish footballer (born 1977)

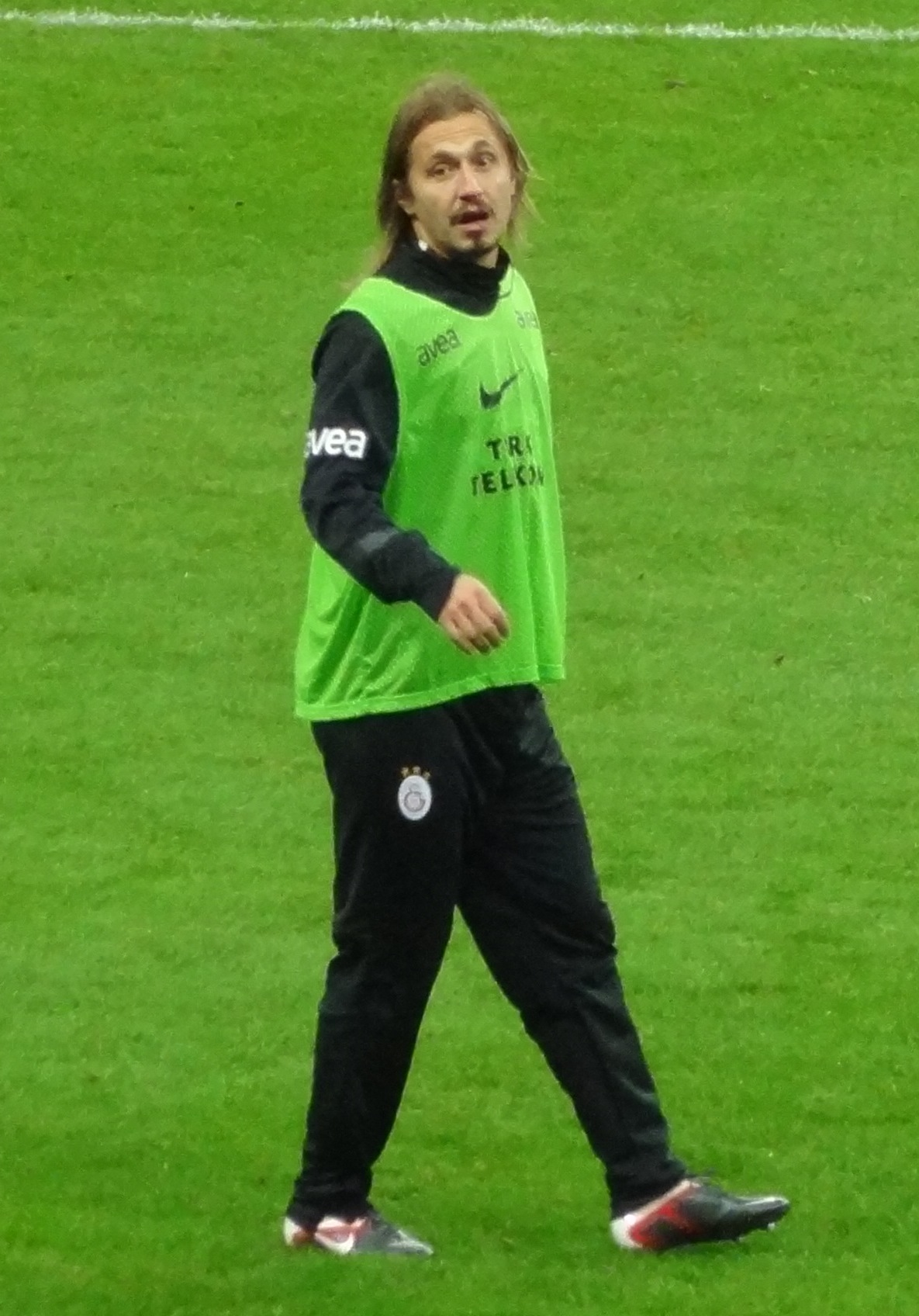

Personal information
- Date of birth: 23 February 1977 (age 49)
- Place of birth: İnegöl, Turkey
- Height: 1.73 m (5 ft 8 in)
- Position: Midfielder

Team information
- Current team: Galatasaray (assistant)

Youth career
- 1987–1993: İnegölspor

Senior career*
Years	Team	Apps	(Gls)
1993–1994	İnegölspor	21	(4)
1994–1998	Gaziantepspor	98	(23)
1998–2001	Beşiktaş	71	(16)
2001–2012	Galatasaray	237	(10)
Total		427	(53)

International career
1991–1992	Turkey U15	4	(0)
1992–1993	Turkey U16	8	(0)
1993	Turkey U17	5	(0)
1994–1995	Turkey U18	15	(2)
1995–1998	Turkey U21	12	(1)
1998–2009	Turkey	22	(0)

Managerial career
- 2013–2014: Galatasaray A2 (assistant)
- 2014: Kayseri Erciyesspor (assistant)
- 2015: Karşıyaka
- 2015–2016: Sarıyer
- 2016–2017: Galatasaray (assistants)
- 2019: Antalyaspor (assistant)
- * Club domestic league appearances and goals

Ayhan Akman (Turkish pronunciation: [ajhan akman]; born 23 February 1977) is a Turkish former professional footballer who played as a midfielder. He was suspended from football for six months after doping testing positive for a banned substance. He is the assistant manager of Galatasaray.

== Club career ==
Akman played for İnegölspor, Gaziantepspor and Beşiktaş.

He was suspended from football for six months after doping testing positive for banned for using banned Anabolik Steroid-Metenolone. His transfer from Gaziantepspor to Besiktas in 1998 for $8.75 million, as requested by manager John Toshack made Ayhan the most expensive internal transfer in Turkish football history, until recently.

=== Galatasaray ===
On 15 February 2012, he announced that he will retire at the end of the 2011–2012 season.

=== Retirement ===
Akman retired from his professional football career as of 13 May 2012.

== International career ==
He was called up to Turkey's Euro 2008 squad and played his first match of the tournament in the semi-final against Germany in Basel.

== Personal life ==
Akman's sons Hamza and Efe Akman are both professional footballers at Galatasaray. He is also the uncle of the Turkish professional footballer Ali Akman.

== Career statistics ==
=== Club ===
Appearances and goals by club, season and competition
Club	Season	League		National cup		League cup (Note: Includes Atatürk Cup and Turkish Super Cup.)		Europe		Total	
Club	Season	Apps	Goals	Apps	Goals	Apps	Goals	Apps	Goals	Apps	Goals
Gaziantepspor	1994–95	19	3	2	1	–		–		21	4
Gaziantepspor	1995–96	31	8	4	1	–		–		35	9
Gaziantepspor	1996–97	25	5	5	1	–		–		30	6
Gaziantepspor	1997–98	23	7	3	1	–		–		26	8
Gaziantepspor	Total	98	23	14	4	–		–		112	27
Beşiktaş	1998–99	29	7	7	3	1	0	–		37	10
Beşiktaş	1999–2000	25	7	1	0	–		–		26	7
Beşiktaş	2000–01	17	2	0	0	1	0	3	0	21	2
Beşiktaş	Total	71	16	8	3	2	0	3	0	84	19
Galatasaray	2001–02	23	0	1	0	0	0	6	0	30	0
Galatasaray	2002–03	21	2	1	0	0	0	4	0	26	2
Galatasaray	2003–04	23	1	2	0	0	0	6	0	30	1
Galatasaray	2004–05	21	1	5	2	0	0	–		26	3
Galatasaray	2005–06	17	2	5	1	1	0	–		23	3
Galatasaray	2006–07	31	1	4	0	0	0	6	0	41	1
Galatasaray	2007–08	17	1	3	0	1	0	5	1	26	2
Galatasaray	2008–09	31	1	4	1	0	0	10	1	45	3
Galatasaray	2009–10	19	0	6	0	–		11	0	36	0
Galatasaray	2010–11	26	1	5	0	0	0	4	0	35	1
Galatasaray	2011–12	8	0	1	1	0	0	0	0	9	1
Galatasaray	Total	237	10	37	5	2	0	52	2	327	17
Career total		406	49	60	11	6	1	55	2	523	63

=== International ===
Appearances and goals by national team and year
National team	Year	Apps	Goals
Turkey	1998	2	0
Turkey	1999	3	0
Turkey	2000	1	0
Turkey	2001	0	0
Turkey	2002	0	0
Turkey	2003	0	0
Turkey	2004	0	0
Turkey	2005	1	0
Turkey	2006	0	0
Turkey	2007	2	0
Turkey	2008	8	0
Turkey	2009	5	0
Total		22	0

== Honours ==
Beşiktaş

- Türkiye Kupası: 1997–98
- Atatürk Kupası: 2000

Galatasaray

- Süper Lig: 2001–02, 2005–06, 2007–08, 2011–12
- Türkiye Kupası: 2004–05
- Süper Kupa: 2007–08

Turkey

- UEFA European Championship bronze medalist: 2008
