= Fevzi Tuncay =

Turkish football retired goalkeeper (born 1977)

Personal information
- Full name: Fevzi Tuncay
- Date of birth: 14 September 1977 (age 49)
- Place of birth: Muğla, Turkey
- Height: 1.94 m (6 ft 4 1/2 in)
- Position: Goalkeeper

Youth career
- –1996: Muğlaspor

Senior career*
Years	Team	Apps	(Gls)
1994	Muğlaspor	1	(0)
1995–2002	Beşiktaş	116	(0)
2002	Gaziantepspor	7	(0)
2002–2003	Samsunspor	10	(0)
2003–2006	Malatyaspor	65	(0)
2006–2007	Vestel Manisaspor	15	(0)
2007	Malatyaspor	14	(0)
2008	Fethiyespor	1	(0)
2008	Malatyaspor	10	(0)
2009–2010	Diyarbakirspor	17	(0)
2010	Kocaelispor	4	(0)
2010–2011	Giresunspor	10	(0)
2011–2012	Tavşanlı Linyitspor	2	(0)

International career
1999–2000	Turkey	1	(0)
- * Club domestic league appearances and goals

Fevzi Tuncay (born 14 September 1977, in Muğla) is a Turkish football retired goalkeeper.

He became professional in Muğlaspor. He transferred to Beşiktaş in 1997. He played mostly for Beşiktaş J.K. and Malatyaspor. He also played for Gaziantepspor and Malatyaspor.

He played for Turkey national football team and was a participant at the Euro 2000.

== Honours ==
Beşiktaş J.K.

- Turkish Cup: 1997–98
- Turkish Super Cup: 1998

Turkey

- UEFA Euro 2000 Quarter-Finalist
