= Oğuzhan Bahadır =

Turkish footballer

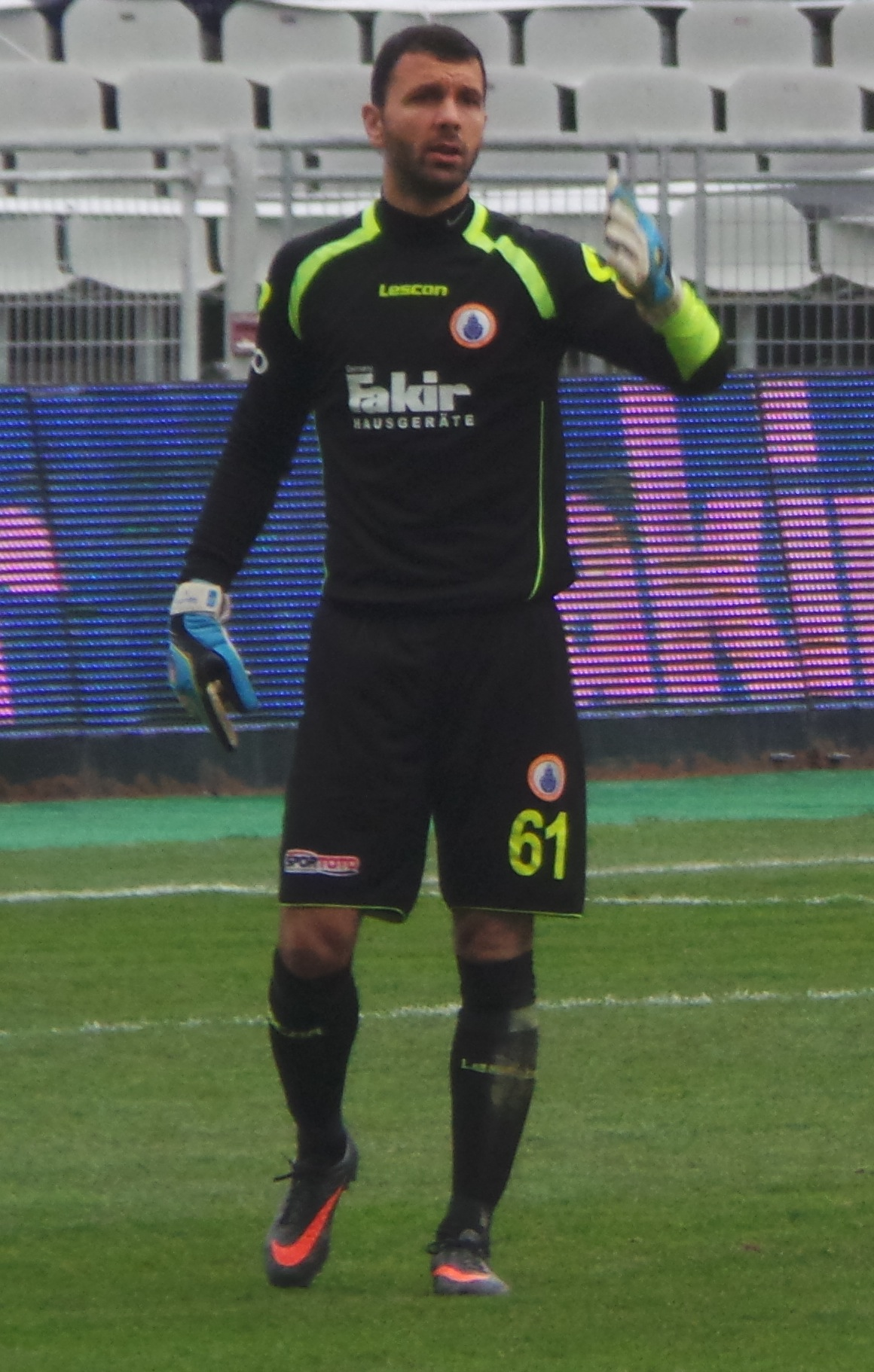
- Oğuzhan Bahadır (2014)

Personal information
- Full name: Oğuzhan Bahadır
- Date of birth: December 24, 1979 (age 46)
- Place of birth: Ankara, Turkey
- Height: 1.91 m (6 ft 3 in)
- Position: Goalkeeper

Team information
- Current team: Kırklarelispor
- Number: 61

Senior career*
Years	Team	Apps	(Gls)
2003	MKE Ankaragücü	4	(0)
2004	Elazigspor	5	(0)
2006–2009	Konyaspor	46	(0)
2009–2014	İstanbul Başakşehir	81	(0)
2014–2016	Göztepe SK	44	(0)
2016	Kayseri Erciyesspor	7	(0)
2016–	Kırklarelispor	17	(0)
- * Club domestic league appearances and goals as of 24 December 2016 (UTC)

Oğuzhan Bahadır (born December 24, 1979, in Ankara) is a Turkish football goalkeeper who plays for Kırklarelispor.
