= 2025 Turkish Cup final =

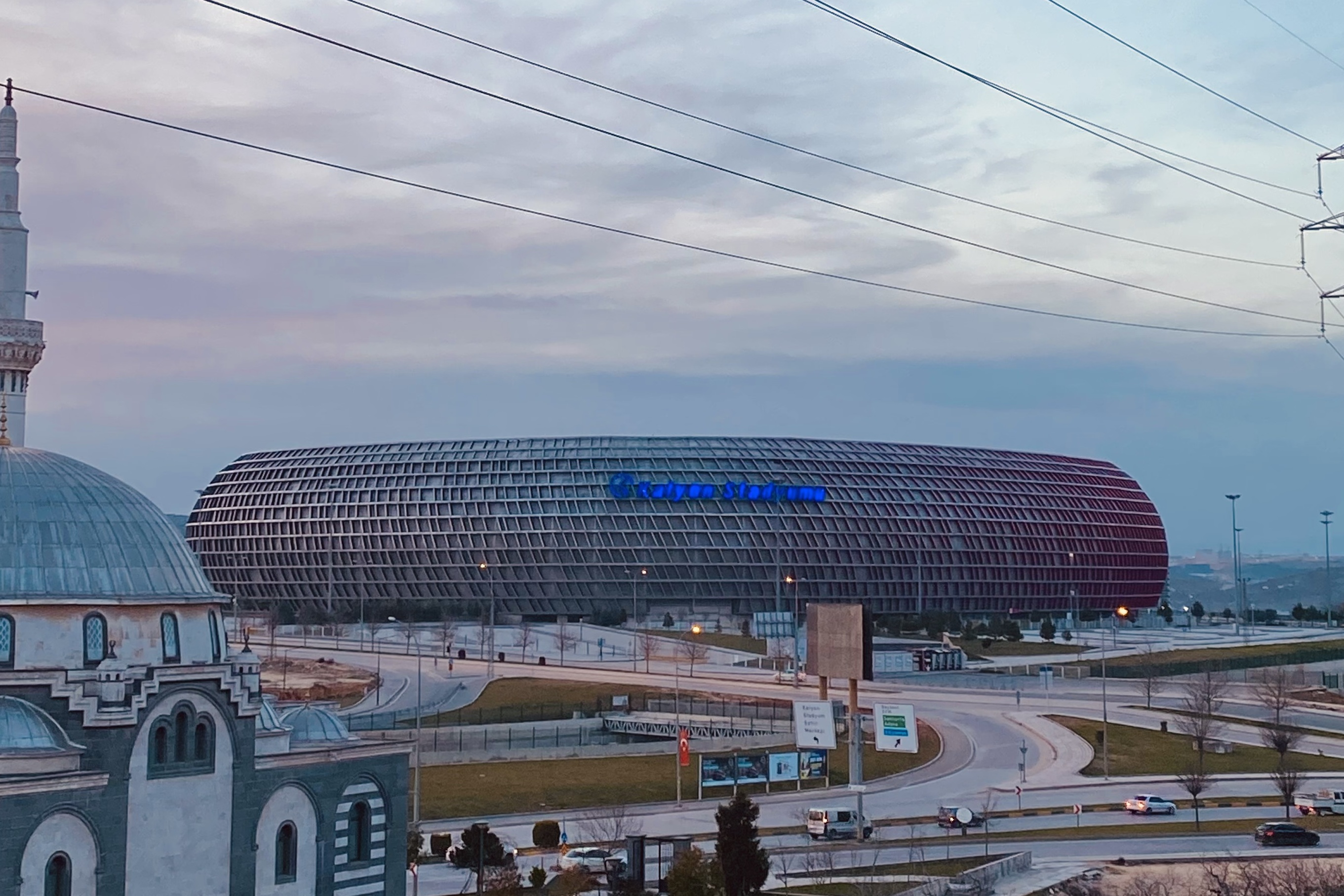
- Gaziantep Stadium hosted the final
- Event: 2024–25 Turkish Cup
Trabzonspor	Galatasaray
0	3
- Date: 14 May 2025
- Venue: Gaziantep Stadium, Gaziantep
- Man of the Match: Victor Osimhen (Galatasaray)
- Referee: Cihan Aydın

The 2025 Turkish Cup final was the decisive match of the 2024–25 Turkish Cup, the 63rd edition of Turkey's primary football cup competition organized by the Turkish Football Federation (TFF). The final was played on 14 May 2025 at Gaziantep Stadium, and featured Galatasaray and Trabzonspor.

On 16 April 2025, the match was initially announced to be held at the New Eskişehir Stadium in Eskişehir. However, following objections from the city's governor, the TFF reversed the decision. On 25 April 2025, the TFF announced that the match would be played at Gaziantep Stadium.

The winner of the match secured a place in the play-off round of the 2025–26 UEFA Europa League play-off round and also qualified for the 2025 Turkish Super Cup.

Galatasaray won the match 3-0 for a record-extending 19th, and first title since 2018-19 Turkish Cup.

== Route to the final ==
Note: In all results below, the score of the finalist is given first (H: home; A: away).

Trabzonspor		Round	Galatasaray	
Opponent	Result	Group stage	Opponent	Result
Alanyaspor	3–0 (H)	Matchday 1	Başakşehir	2–2 (H)
İskenderunspor	2–2 (A)	Matchday 2	Boluspor	4–1 (A)
Çaykur Rizespor	5–2 (H)	Matchday 3	Konyaspor	0–0 (H)
Group A winners: Pos / Team / Pld / Pts; 1 / Trabzonspor / 3 / 7; 2 / İskenderunspor / 3 / 5; 3 / Alanyaspor / 3 / 4; 4 / Çaykur Rizespor / 3 / 3; 5 / Fatih Karagümrük / 3 / 3; 6 / MKE Ankaragücü / 3 / 2; Source:		Final standings	Group C runners-up: Pos / Team / Pld / Pts; 1 / Konyaspor / 3 / 7; 2 / Galatasaray / 3 / 5; 3 / İstanbul Başakşehir / 3 / 5; 4 / Eyüpspor / 3 / 4; 5 / Çorum / 3 / 3; 6 / Boluspor / 3 / 0; Source:	
Opponent	Result	Knockout phase	Opponent	Result
Bodrum	3–2 (H)	Quarter-finals	Fenerbahçe	2–1 (A)
Göztepe	2–0 (H)	Semi-finals	Konyaspor	5–1 (A)

== Match ==
=== Details ===
14 May 2025
20:45 TRT

Trabzonspor	0–3	Galatasaray
	Report	Yılmaz 5'; Osimhen 46', 63'

Gaziantep Stadium, Gaziantep
Referee: Cihan Aydın

Trabzonspor	Galatasaray

Trabzonspor
GK	1	(Turkey) Uğurcan Çakır
RB	19	(Turkey) Mustafa Eskihellaç
CB	15	(Montenegro) Stefan Savić (yellow card) 21'
CB	44	(Ukraine) Arseniy Batahov (substituted off) 45+2'
LB	79	(Portugal) Pedro Malheiro
CM	6	(France) Batista Mendy (substituted off) 80'
CM	35	(Turkey) Okay Yokuşlu (substituted off) 60'
RW	22	(Ukraine) Oleksandr Zubkov
AM	11	(Turkey) Ozan Tufan (substituted off) 80'
LW	9	(Nigeria) Anthony Nwakaeme
CF	17	(Democratic Republic of the Congo) Simon Banza (substituted off) 60'
Substitutes
GK	54	(Turkey) Muhammet Taha Tepe
DF	29	(Turkey) Serdar Saatçı (substituted on) 80'
DF	77	(Turkey) Arif Boşluk
DF	84	(Turkey) Ali Şahin Yılmaz
MF	10	(Austria) Muhammed Cham (substituted on) 80'
MF	5	(England) John Lundstram (substituted on) 45' (yellow card) 58'
FW	7	(Bosnia and Herzegovina) Edin Višća (substituted on) 60'
FW	70	(Romania) Denis Drăguș (substituted on) 60'
FW	61	(Turkey) Cihan Çanak
FW	14	(Ukraine) Danylo Sikan
Manager
(Turkey) Fatih Tekke

Galatasaray
GK	19	(Turkey) Günay Güvenç
RB	6	(Colombia) Davinson Sánchez
CB	42	(Turkey) Abdülkerim Bardakcı (substituted off) 72' (yellow card) 72'
CB	7	(Hungary) Roland Sallai
LB	17	(Turkey) Eren Elmalı (substituted off) 78'
CM	34	(Uruguay) Lucas Torreira
CM	99	(Gabon) Mario Lemina (substituted off) 72'
RW	11	(Turkey) Yunus Akgün
AM	20	(Brazil) Gabriel Sara (substituted off) 62'
LW	53	(Turkey) Barış Alper Yılmaz
CF	45	(Nigeria) Victor Osimhen (substituted off) 72'
Substitutes
GK	1	(Uruguay) Fernando Muslera
DF	23	(Turkey) Kaan Ayhan (substituted on) 72'
DF	4	(Senegal) Ismail Jakobs (substituted on) 78'
DF	26	(Colombia) Carlos Cuesta
MF	8	(Germany) Kerem Demirbay (substituted on) 72'
MF	10	(Belgium) Dries Mertens (substituted on) 72' (yellow card) 79'
MF	29	(Poland) Przemysław Frankowski
FW	77	(Spain) Álvaro Morata (substituted on) 62'
FW	21	(Turkey) Ahmed Kutucu
FW	18	(Turkey) Berkan Kutlu
Manager
(Turkey) Okan Buruk

Man of the Match: Victor Osimhen (Galatasaray)

Assistant referees:
(Turkey) Hakan Yemişken
(Turkey) Mustafa Savranlar
Fourth official:
(Turkey) Ozan Ergün
Reserve assistant referee:
N/A
Video assistant referee:
(Poland) Tomasz Kwiatkowski
Assistant video assistant referees:
(Turkey) Onur Özütoprak

Match rules

- 90 minutes.
- 30 minutes of extra time if necessary.
- Penalty shoot-out if scores still level.
- Eleven named substitutes.
- Maximum of five substitutions, with a sixth allowed in extra time. (Note: Each team will be given only three opportunities to make substitutions, with a fourth opportunity in extra time, excluding substitutions made at half-time, before the start of extra time and at half-time in extra time.)
