= Sabri Sarıoğlu =

Turkish footballer (born 1984)

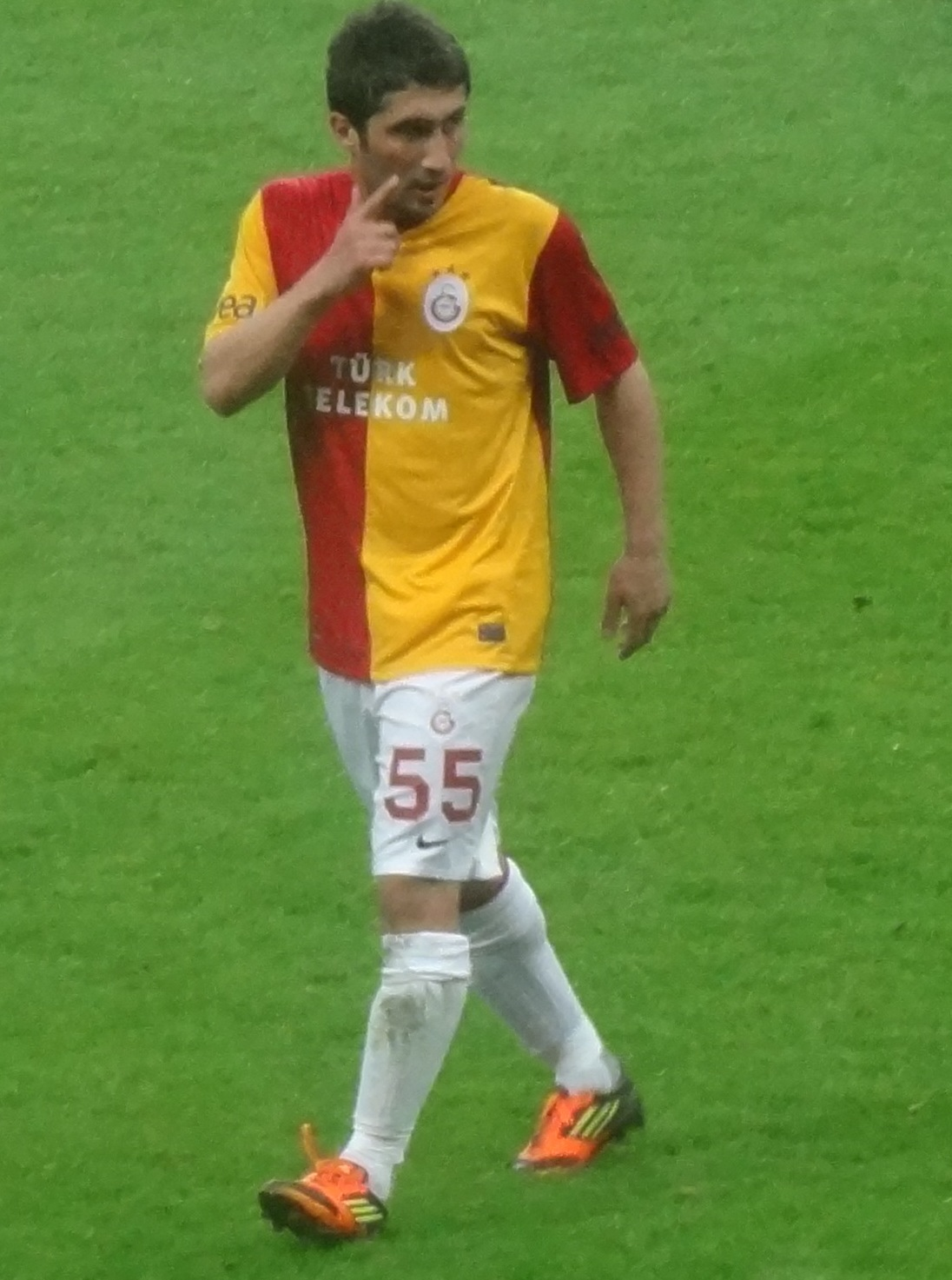
- Sabri playing for Galatasaray in 2012

Personal information
- Date of birth: 26 July 1984 (age 42)
- Place of birth: Çarşamba, Samsun, Turkey
- Height: 1.70 m (5 ft 7 in)
- Position: Right back

Youth career
- 1995–1999: Yeni Özkartalspor
- 1999–2002: Galatasaray

Senior career*
Years	Team	Apps	(Gls)
2003–2017	Galatasaray	357	(15)
2017–2018	Göztepe	29	(0)
Total		386	(15)

International career
1999–2001	Turkey U16	5	(2)
1999–2001	Turkey U17	14	(1)
2000	Turkey U18	3	(0)
2001–2002	Turkey U19	15	(2)
2003	Turkey U20	2	(0)
2003–2006	Turkey U21	21	(1)
2006–2011	Turkey	44	(1)
- * Club domestic league appearances and goals

Sabri Sarıoğlu (born 26 July 1984) is a Turkish former professional footballer who most notably played for Galatasaray and the Turkey national team.

== Club career ==
=== Galatasaray ===
Born in Çarşamba, Samsun Province, Sabri spent almost his entire career with Galatasaray, having risen through the ranks of the Galatasaray youth team. He was first called up to feature for the first team, at the age of 17, in the 2001–02 season under manager Mircea Lucescu. He was in Galatasaray's official squad-list for the 2001–02 UEFA Champions League. The 2001–02 season also marked the first time he made his way into Galatasaray bench for an official match, but he failed to make an appearance. He made his competitive debut for the first team in a Süper Lig match the following season against Trabzonspor on 4 May 2003, in the side now managed by Fatih Terim.

He marked his 100th league appearance for Galatasaray on 10 December 2006 against Bursaspor, by scoring a goal after a fantastic build-up play from his own half of the pitch.

After the former captain Arda Turan's departure to Atlético Madrid, he became the club's captain in September 2011.

Sabri's contract was not renewed at the end of 2016–17 season and his Galatasaray career was effectively over.

== International career ==
He was a regular member of the Turkey squad. He was part of the 23-man squad for the European Championships and registered one assist during the finals of Euro 2008.

== Career statistics ==
=== Club ===
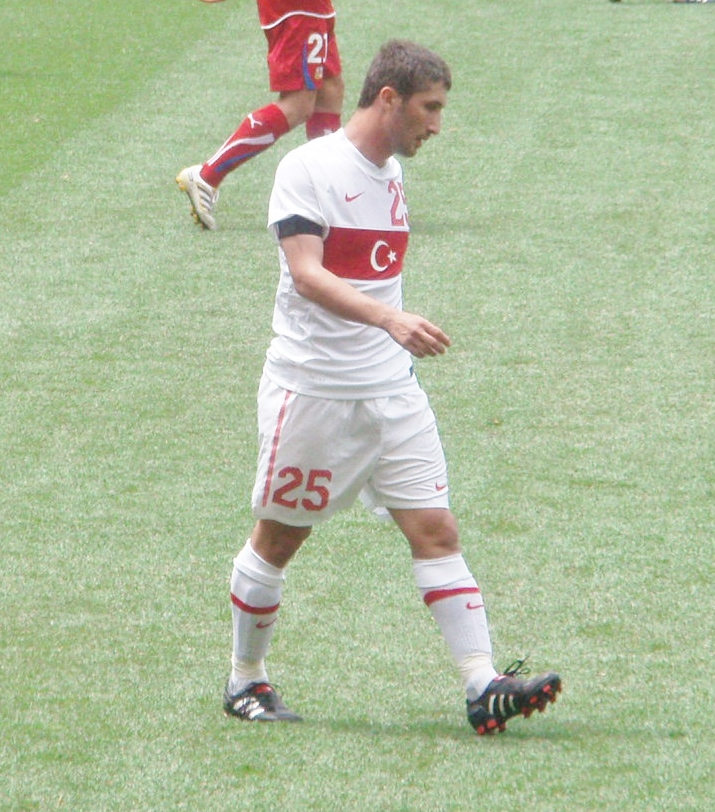
Sabri playing for Turkey in 2010

Appearances and goals by club, season and competition
Club	Season	League			Turkish Cup		Europe		Other		Total	
Club	Season	Division	Apps	Goals	Apps	Goals	Apps	Goals	Apps	Goals	Apps	Goals
Galatasaray	2002–03	Süper Lig	3	0	0	0	0	0	0	0	3	0
Galatasaray	2003–04	Süper Lig	31	4	2	0	8	1	0	0	41	5
Galatasaray	2004–05	Süper Lig	31	2	4	0	0	0	—		35	1
Galatasaray	2005–06	Süper Lig	21	3	4	1	1	0	1	0	27	4
Galatasaray	2006–07	Süper Lig	30	2	6	1	8	1	0	0	44	4
Galatasaray	2007–08	Süper Lig	22	1	6	0	6	0	1	0	35	1
Galatasaray	2008–09	Süper Lig	25	0	5	0	9	1	—		39	1
Galatasaray	2009–10	Süper Lig	24	1	1	0	9	1	—		34	2
Galatasaray	2010–11	Süper Lig	24	0	4	0	2	0	—		29	0
Galatasaray	2011–12	Süper Lig	27	1	2	0	—		0	0	29	1
Galatasaray	2012–13	Süper Lig	16	0	2	0	4	0	0	0	22	0
Galatasaray	2013–14	Süper Lig	24	0	6	1	0	0	0	0	30	1
Galatasaray	2014–15	Süper Lig	25	0	6	1	0	0	0	0	31	1
Galatasaray	2015–16	Süper Lig	25	0	7	0	8	1	1	0	43	1
Galatasaray	2016–17	Süper Lig	27	1	6	1	—		0	0	33	2
Galatasaray	Total		357	15	61	5	56	5	3	0	477	25
Göztepe	2017–18	Süper Lig	29	0	0	0	—		—		29	0
Career total			386	15	61	5	56	5	3	0	506	25

=== International ===
Appearances and goals by national team and year
National team	Year	Apps	Goals
Turkey	2006	3	0
Turkey	2007	8	1
Turkey	2008	11	0
Turkey	2009	6	0
Turkey	2010	8	0
Turkey	2011	8	0
Total		44	1

#	Date	Venue	Opponent	Score	Result	Competition
1.	2 June 2007	Asim Ferhatović Hase, Sarajevo, Bosnia-Herzegovina	Bosnia and Herzegovina	3–2	Loss	Euro 2008 qual.
Correct as of 13 January 2015

== Honours ==
Galatasaray

- Süper Lig: 2001–02, 2005–06, 2007–08, 2011–12, 2012–13, 2014–15
- Türkiye Kupası: 2004–05, 2013–14, 2014–15, 2015–16
- Süper Kupa: 2008, 2012, 2013, 2015, 2016

Turkey

- UEFA European Championship bronze medalist: 2008

Sporting positions
Preceded by Arda Turan	Galatasaray captain 2011–2014	Succeeded by Selçuk İnan
