= Toprak Kırtoğlu =

Turkish footballer (born 1971)

Personal information
- Full name: Toprak Kırtoğlu
- Date of birth: 10 June 1971 (age 55)
- Place of birth: Germany
- Positions: Right back; right wing back

Team information
- Current team: Fenerbahçe (chef scout)

Senior career*
Years	Team	Apps	(Gls)
1989–1994	Altay	66	(4)
1991–1992	→ Manisaspor (loan)	6	(3)
1994–1995	Fenerbahçe	15	(1)
1995–2000	Kocaelispor	63	(1)
1999–2000	→ Antalyaspor (loan)	4	(0)
2000–2003	Altay	52	(5)
2004–2005	Hatayspor	10	(0)
2005–2006	Erzurumspor	23	(1)
2006	Yıldırım Bosna	12	(1)
2006	Adanaspor	13	(0)
2007	Erzurumspor	9	(0)

Managerial career
- 2012: Altay
- * Club domestic league appearances and goals

Toprak Kırtoğlu (born 10 June 1971) is a former professional footballer and chef scout of Turkish Süper Lig club Fenerbahçe under Emre Belözoğlu management.

== Club career ==
He started his professional career with Altay and also played for Manisaspor, Fenerbahçe, Kocaelispor, Antalyaspor, Hatayspor, Erzurumspor, Yıldırım Bosna and Adanaspor.

== Managing career ==
After retiring from football, he served as an assistant manager at Sivasspor, Bucaspor, Elazığspor, Akhisar Belediyespor Balıkesirspor alongside Bülent Uygun, Eskişehirspor alongside Yılmaz Vural, Gaziantepspor, Şanlıurfaspor, Balıkesirspor, Manisa FK alongside Cihat Arslan.

From March to June of 2012, he was head coach of Altay.

After 2021, he started to work with Emre Belözoğlu, he work as a coach at Çaykur Rizespor, served as assistant manager at Istanbul Başakşehir and Ankaragücü alongside Emre Belözoğlu.

On 3 November 2026, Emre Belözoğlu was appointed head coach of Fenerbahçe and Kırtoğlu also appointed as chef scout.
