= Turkish Cup =

Association football tournament in Turkey

Ziraat Türkiye Kupası
- Organiser(s): Turkish Football Federation (TFF)
- Founded: 1962
- Region: Turkey
- Teams: 164 (since 2023–24)
- Qualifier for: UEFA Europa League
- Domestic cup: Turkish Super Cup
- Current champions: Trabzonspor (10th title)
- Most championships: Galatasaray (19 titles)
- Broadcaster: ATV
- Website: tff.org
- 2026–27 Turkish Cup

The Turkish Cup (Turkish: Türkiye Kupası) is an annual football cup competition in Turkey, organised by the Turkish Football Federation since 1962. During a period of sponsorship by Fortis, the competition was temporarily known as the Fortis Turkish Cup (Turkish: Fortis Türkiye Kupası). It is currently sponsored by the state-owned bank Ziraat Bankası and officially called the Ziraat Turkish Cup (Turkish: Ziraat Türkiye Kupası).

The tournament has been held under various formats, including a traditional knockout competition and group stages on an experimental basis. An expanded format was introduced for the 2012–13 season, with a record 156 teams participating. The structure included a round-robin group stage following five knockout rounds, with group winners and runners-up advancing to the semi-finals and final. The current holders of the cup are Trabzonspor.

== Tournament format ==
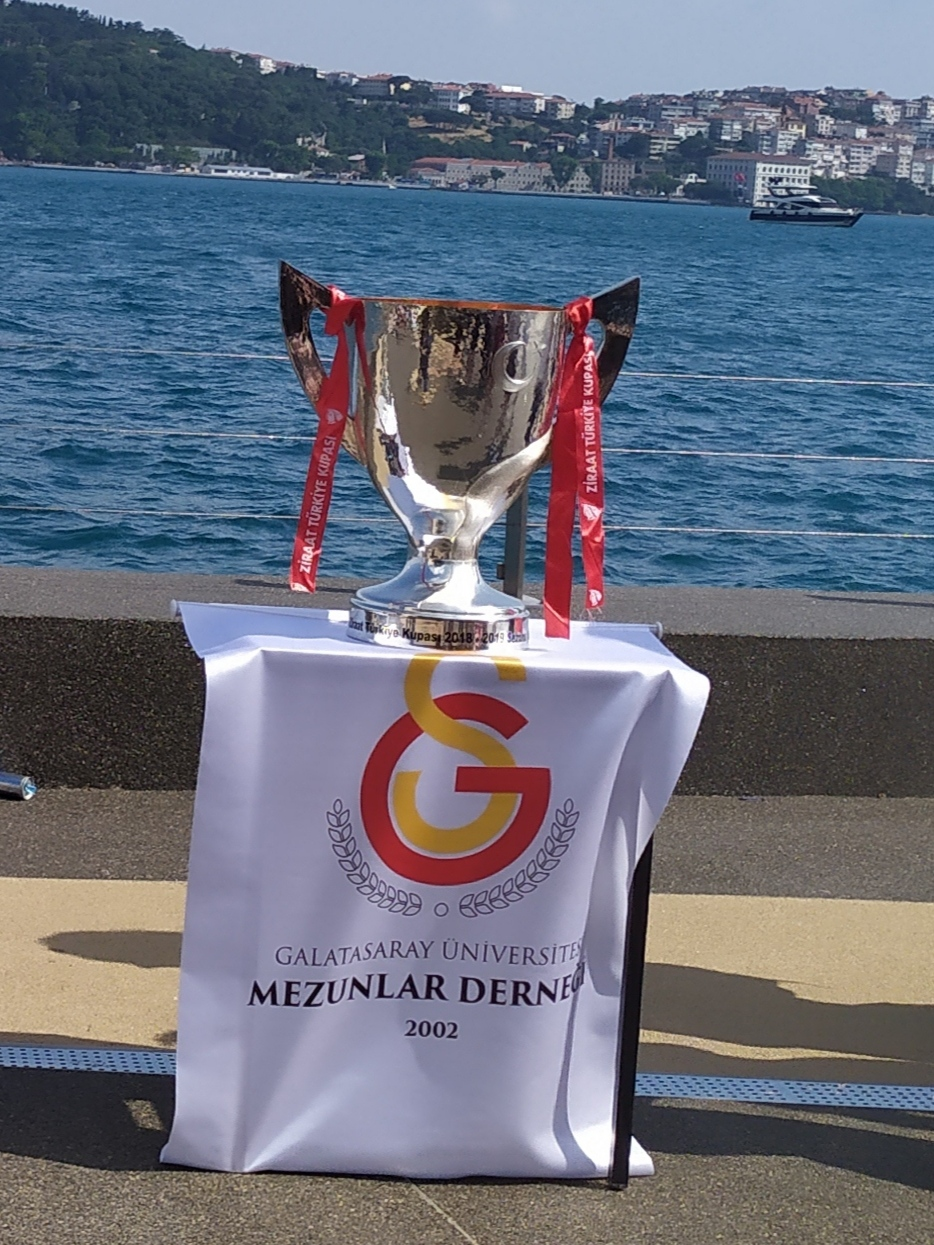
The current design of the trophy, in use since the 2005 final

The Turkish Cup currently involves 164 clubs, drawn from the top four tiers of the Turkish football league system as well as the Turkish Regional Amateur League. The winner of the competition qualifies for the play-off round of the UEFA Europa League and also competes in the Turkish Super Cup against the Süper Lig champions.

Round	Clubs remaining	Clubs involved	Winners from previous round	New entries this round	Leagues entering at this stage
Preliminary round	164	28	0	28	Turkish Regional Amateur League
First round	150	62	14	48	TFF Third League
Second round	119	50	31	19	TFF Second League
Third round	94	68	25	43	Süper Lig, TFF First League, TFF Second League, TFF Third League
Fourth round	60	56	34	22	Süper Lig, TFF First League, TFF Second League
Fifth round	32	32	28	4	Süper Lig
Round of 16	16	16	16	0	–
Quarter-finals	8	8	8	0	–
Semi-finals	4	4	4	0	–
Final	2	2	2	0	–

== Trophy and prize money ==
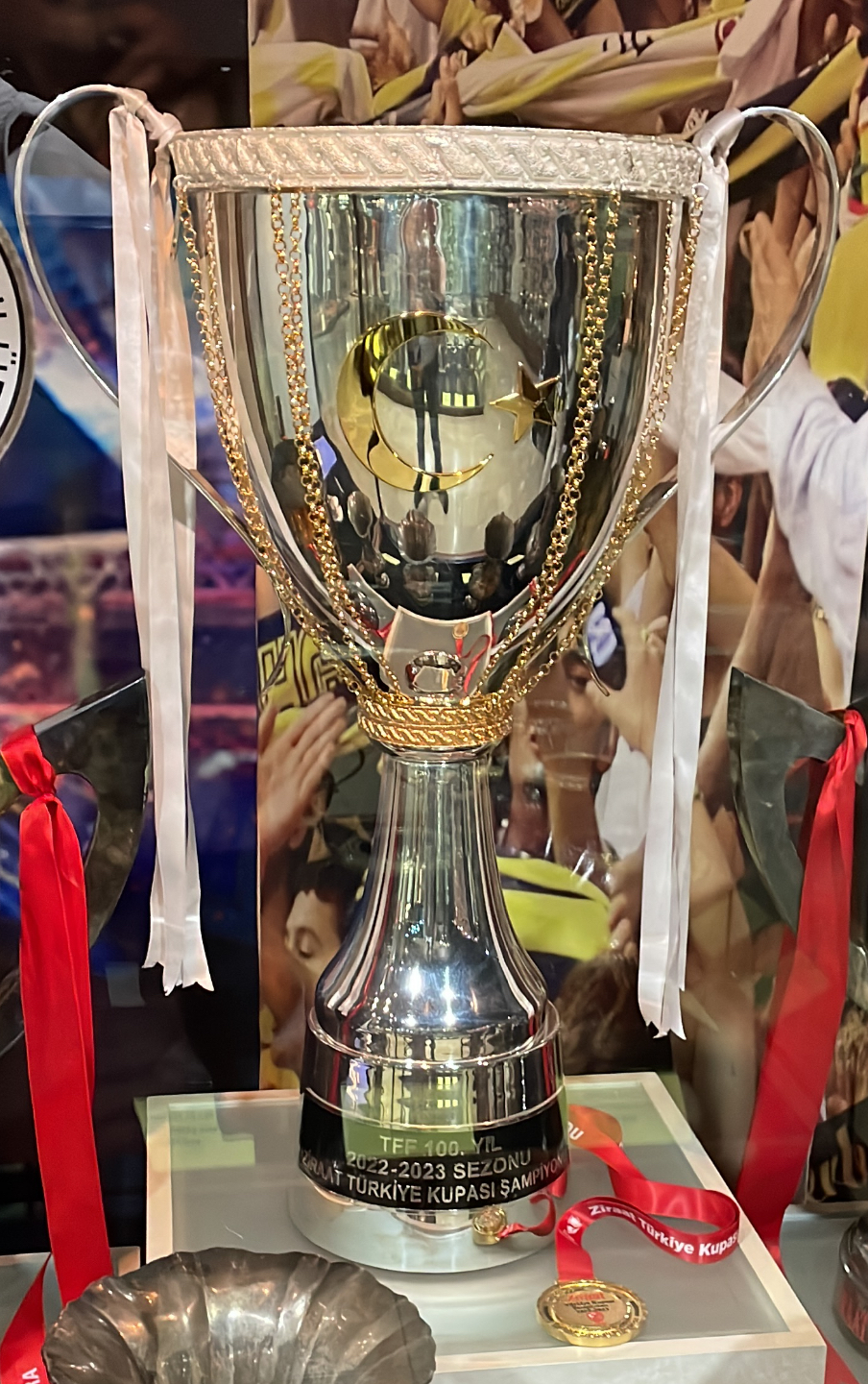
Centennial version of the trophy won by Fenerbahçe in the 2023 final

The Turkish Football Federation (TFF) awards the Turkish Cup trophy (current design pictured) to the winners of the final. Both winners and runners-up receive 50 medals each. Prize money is also distributed, with payments based on reaching a particular round rather than winning matches, except in the final where the runners-up receive less than the champions.

The total prize fund amounts to approximately US$10.5 million. In addition, as a mark of honour, the cup-winning club wears a roundel of the Turkish flag during the following season.

Round	Number of teams	Prize per team (US$)	Total prize (US$)
First round	22	20,000	440,000
Second round	28	20,000	560,000
Third round	32	85,000	2,720,000
Fourth round	16	115,000	1,840,000
Quarter-finals	8	140,000	1,120,000
Semi-finals	4	380,000	1,520,000
Runners-up	1	900,000	900,000
Cup winners	1	1,400,000	1,400,000

== Winners ==
=== Key ===
**Bold**	Indicates the winning team
aet	Winner won after extra time
p	Winner won by a penalty shoot-out after extra time
wo	Winner won by a walkover

=== Two-legged finals ===
Season	Home team	Score	Away team	Venue	Attendance	Description
1962–63	**Galatasaray**	2–1	Fenerbahçe	İnönü Stadium	23,740	Galatasaray won 4–2 on aggregate.
1962–63	Fenerbahçe	1–2	**Galatasaray**	İnönü Stadium	27,361	Galatasaray won 4–2 on aggregate.
1963–64	Altay	0–0	**Galatasaray**	İzmir Alsancak Stadium	8,035	Altay did not play the second leg, thus Galatasaray were awarded a 3–0 win.
1963–64	**Galatasaray**	3–0 (wo)	Altay	İnönü Stadium	====	Altay did not play the second leg, thus Galatasaray were awarded a 3–0 win.
1964–65	**Galatasaray**	0–0	Fenerbahçe	İnönü Stadium	34,302	Galatasaray won 1–0 on aggregate.
1964–65	Fenerbahçe	0–1	**Galatasaray**	İnönü Stadium	24,973	Galatasaray won 1–0 on aggregate.
1965–66	**Galatasaray**	1–0	Beşiktaş	İnönü Stadium	33,446	Altay won on coin toss.
1966–67	**Altay**	0–0	Göztepe	İzmir Alsancak Stadium	====	Altay won on coin toss.
1967–68	**Fenerbahçe**	2–0	Altay	İnönü Stadium	32,712	Fenerbahçe won 2–1 on aggregate.
1967–68	Altay	1–0	**Fenerbahçe**	İzmir Alsancak Stadium	18,130	Fenerbahçe won 2–1 on aggregate.
1968–69	**Göztepe**	1–0	Galatasaray	İzmir Alsancak Stadium	====	Göztepe won 2–1 on aggregate.
1968–69	Galatasaray	1–1 (a.e.t.)	**Göztepe**	İnönü Stadium	24,830	Göztepe won 2–1 on aggregate.
1969–70	Eskişehirspor	2–1	**Göztepe**	Eskişehir Atatürk Stadium	====	Göztepe won 4–3 on aggregate.
1969–70	**Göztepe**	3–1	Eskişehirspor	İzmir Alsancak Stadium	====	Göztepe won 4–3 on aggregate.
1970–71	Bursaspor	1–0	**Eskişehirspor**	Bursa Atatürk Stadium	====	Eskişehirspor won 2–1 on aggregate.
1970–71	**Eskişehirspor**	2–0	Bursaspor	Eskişehir Atatürk Stadium	====	Eskişehirspor won 2–1 on aggregate.
1971–72	Altay	0–0	**Ankaragücü**	İzmir Atatürk Stadium	30,000	Ankaragücü won 3–0 on aggregate.
1971–72	**Ankaragücü**	3–0	Altay	Ankara 19 Mayıs Stadium	====	Ankaragücü won 3–0 on aggregate.
1972–73	**Galatasaray**	3–1	Ankaragücü	İnönü Stadium	20,824	Galatasaray won 4–2 on aggregate.
1972–73	Ankaragücü	1–1	**Galatasaray**	Ankara 19 Mayıs Stadium	21,612	Galatasaray won 4–2 on aggregate.
1973–74	Bursaspor	1–0	**Fenerbahçe**	Bursa Atatürk Stadium	====	Fenerbahçe won 3–1 on aggregate.
1973–74	**Fenerbahçe**	3–0	Bursaspor	İnönü Stadium	23,622	Fenerbahçe won 3–1 on aggregate.
1974–75	Trabzonspor	1–0	**Beşiktaş**	Hüseyin Avni Aker Stadium	====	Beşiktaş won 2–1 on aggregate.
1974–75	**Beşiktaş**	2–0	Trabzonspor	BJK İnönü Stadium	====	Beşiktaş won 2–1 on aggregate.
1975–76	Trabzonspor	1–0	**Galatasaray**	Hüseyin Avni Aker Stadium	12,000	Galatasaray won by a penalty shootout.
1975–76	**Galatasaray**	1–0 (5–4 p)	Trabzonspor	İnönü Stadium	42,039	Galatasaray won by a penalty shootout.
1976–77	**Trabzonspor**	1–0	Beşiktaş	Hüseyin Avni Aker Stadium	====	Trabzonspor won 1–0 on aggregate.
1976–77	Beşiktaş	0–0	**Trabzonspor**	BJK İnönü Stadium	39,626	Trabzonspor won 1–0 on aggregate.
1977–78	**Trabzonspor**	3–0	Adana Demirspor	Hüseyin Avni Aker Stadium	6,000	Trabzonspor won 3–0 on aggregate.
1977–78	Adana Demirspor	0–0	**Trabzonspor**	Adana 5 Ocak Stadium	====	Trabzonspor won 3–0 on aggregate.
1978–79	Altay	2–1	**Fenerbahçe**	İzmir Alsancak Stadium	6,250	Fenerbahçe won 3–2 on aggregate.
1978–79	**Fenerbahçe**	2–0	Altay	İnönü Stadium	16,956	Fenerbahçe won 3–2 on aggregate.
1979–80	**Altay**	1–0	Galatasaray	İzmir Alsancak Stadium	18,032	Altay won 2–1 on aggregate.
1979–80	Galatasaray	1–1	**Altay**	İnönü Stadium	30,650	Altay won 2–1 on aggregate.
1980–81	**Ankaragücü**	2–1	Boluspor	Ankara 19 Mayıs Stadium	13,357	Ankaragücü won 2–1 on aggregate.
1980–81	Boluspor	0–0	**Ankaragücü**	Bolu Atatürk Stadium	====	Ankaragücü won 2–1 on aggregate.
1981–82	**Galatasaray**	3–0	Ankaragücü	Ali Sami Yen Stadium	34,311	Galatasaray won 4–2 on aggregate.
1981–82	Ankaragücü	2–1	**Galatasaray**	Ankara 19 Mayıs Stadium	20,045	Galatasaray won 4–2 on aggregate.
1982–83	**Fenerbahçe**	2–0	Mersin İdman Yurdu	Şükrü Saracoğlu Stadium	====	Fenerbahçe won 4–1 on aggregate.
1982–83	Mersin İdman Yurdu	1–2	**Fenerbahçe**	Tevfik Sırrı Gür Stadium	18,000	Fenerbahçe won 4–1 on aggregate.
1983–84	**Trabzonspor**	2–0 (a.e.t.)	Beşiktaş	İzmir Atatürk Stadium	17,956	====
1984–85	Trabzonspor	1–2	**Galatasaray**	Hüseyin Avni Aker Stadium	====	Galatasaray won 2–1 on aggregate.
1984–85	**Galatasaray**	0–0	Trabzonspor	İnönü Stadium	21,214	Galatasaray won 2–1 on aggregate.
1985–86	**Bursaspor**	2–0	Altay	Bursa Atatürk Stadium	18,823	
1986–87	**Gençlerbirliği**	5–0	Eskişehirspor	Ankara 19 Mayıs Stadium	13,792	Gençlerbirliği won 6–2 on aggregate.
1986–87	Eskişehirspor	2–1	**Gençlerbirliği**	Eskişehir Atatürk Stadium	====	Gençlerbirliği won 6–2 on aggregate.
1987–88	**Sakaryaspor**	2–0	Samsunspor	Sakarya Atatürk Stadium	6,000	Sakaryaspor won 3–1 on aggregate.
1987–88	Samsunspor	1–1	**Sakaryaspor**	Samsun 19 Mayıs Stadium	====	Sakaryaspor won 3–1 on aggregate.
1988–89	Fenerbahçe	0–1	**Beşiktaş**	Şükrü Saracoğlu Stadium	6,120	Beşiktaş won 3–1 on aggregate.
1988–89	**Beşiktaş**	2–1	Fenerbahçe	BJK İnönü Stadium	16,678	Beşiktaş won 3–1 on aggregate.
1989–90	**Beşiktaş**	2–0	Trabzonspor	İzmir Atatürk Stadium	27,066	
1990–91	**Galatasaray**	3–1 (a.e.t.)	Ankaragücü	İzmir Atatürk Stadium	20,240	
1991–92	Bursaspor	3–0	**Trabzonspor**	Bursa Atatürk Stadium	====	Trabzonspor won 5–4 on aggregate.
1991–92	**Trabzonspor**	5–1	Bursaspor	Hüseyin Avni Aker Stadium	====	Trabzonspor won 5–4 on aggregate.
1992–93	**Galatasaray**	1–0	Beşiktaş	Ali Sami Yen Stadium	22,446	Galatasaray won 3–2 on aggregate.
1992–93	Beşiktaş	2–2	**Galatasaray**	BJK İnönü Stadium	21,582	Galatasaray won 3–2 on aggregate.
1993–94	Galatasaray	0–0	**Beşiktaş**	Ali Sami Yen Stadium	====	Beşiktaş won 3–2 on aggregate.
1993–94	**Beşiktaş**	3–2	Galatasaray	BJK İnönü Stadium	23,400	Beşiktaş won 3–2 on aggregate.
1994–95	Galatasaray	2–3	**Trabzonspor**	Ali Sami Yen Stadium	27,827	Trabzonspor won 4–2 on aggregate.
1994–95	**Trabzonspor**	1–0	Galatasaray	Hüseyin Avni Aker Stadium	22,000	Trabzonspor won 4–2 on aggregate.
1995–96	**Galatasaray**	1–0	Fenerbahçe	Ali Sami Yen Stadium	24,285	Galatasaray won 2–1 on aggregate.
1995–96	Fenerbahçe	1–1 (a.e.t.)	**Galatasaray**	Şükrü Saracoğlu Stadium	26,420	Galatasaray won 2–1 on aggregate.
1996–97	Trabzonspor	1–1	**Kocaelispor**	Hüseyin Avni Aker Stadium	====	Kocaelispor won 2–1 on aggregate.
1996–97	**Kocaelispor**	1–0	Trabzonspor	Ismet Pasa Stadium	====	Kocaelispor won 2–1 on aggregate.
1997–98	**Beşiktaş**	1–1	Galatasaray	BJK İnönü Stadium	====	Beşiktaş won by a penalty shootout.
1997–98	Galatasaray	1–1 (2–4 p)	**Beşiktaş**	Ali Sami Yen Stadium	26,000	Beşiktaş won by a penalty shootout.
1998–99	**Galatasaray**	0–0	Beşiktaş	Ali Sami Yen Stadium	14,513	Galatasaray won 2–0 on aggregate.
1998–99	Beşiktaş	0–2	**Galatasaray**	BJK İnönü Stadium	====	Galatasaray won 2–0 on aggregate.

=== Single-legged finals ===
Season	Winners	Score	Runners-up	Venue	Attendance
1999–2000	Galatasaray	5–3 (a.e.t.)	Antalyaspor	Diyarbakır Atatürk Stadı	14,000
2000–01	Gençlerbirliği	2–2 (4–1 p)	Fenerbahçe	Kayseri Atatürk Stadı	18,000
2001–02	Kocaelispor	4–0	Beşiktaş	Bursa Atatürk Stadı	18,000
2002–03	Trabzonspor	3–1	Gençlerbirliği	Antalya Atatürk Stadı	10,000
2003–04	Trabzonspor	4–0	Gençlerbirliği	Atatürk Olimpiyat Stadı	40,000
2004–05	Galatasaray	5–1	Fenerbahçe	Atatürk Olimpiyat Stadı	17,061
2005–06	Beşiktaş	3–2 (a.e.t.)	Fenerbahçe	İzmir Atatürk Stadı	50,000
2006–07	Beşiktaş	1–0 (a.e.t.)	Kayseri Erciyesspor	İzmir Atatürk Stadı	40,000
2007–08	Kayserispor	0–0 (11–10 p)	Gençlerbirliği	Bursa Atatürk Stadı	17,000
2008–09	Beşiktaş	4–2	Fenerbahçe	İzmir Atatürk Stadı	50,000
2009–10	Trabzonspor	3–1	Fenerbahçe	Şanlıurfa GAP Stadı	28,000
2010–11	Beşiktaş	2–2 (4–3 p)	İstanbul Başakşehir	Kadir Has Stadı	28,000
2011–12	Fenerbahçe	4–0	Bursaspor	Ankara 19 Mayıs Stadı	19,500
2012–13	Fenerbahçe	1–0	Trabzonspor	Ankara 19 Mayıs Stadı	18,250
2013–14	Galatasaray	1–0	Eskişehirspor	Konya Atatürk Stadı	22,456
2014–15	Galatasaray	3–2	Bursaspor	Bursa Atatürk Stadı	24,500
2015–16	Galatasaray	1–0	Fenerbahçe	Antalya Stadı	32,000
2016–17	Konyaspor	0–0 (4–1 p)	İstanbul Başakşehir	Eskişehir Stadı	30,000
2017–18	Akhisar Belediyespor	3–2	Fenerbahçe	Diyarbakır Stadı	20,000
2018–19	Galatasaray	3–1	Akhisar Belediyespor	Yeni 4 Eylül Stadı	22,000
2019–20	Trabzonspor	2–0	Alanyaspor	Atatürk Olimpiyat Stadı	0
2020–21	Beşiktaş	2–0	Antalyaspor	Gürsel Aksel Stadı	0
2021–22	Sivasspor	3–2 (a.e.t.)	Kayserispor	Atatürk Olimpiyat Stadı	27,798
2022–23	Fenerbahçe	2–0	İstanbul Başakşehir	Gürsel Aksel Stadı	12,182
2023–24	Beşiktaş	3–2	Trabzonspor	Atatürk Olimpiyat Stadı	60,464
2024–25	Galatasaray	3–0	Trabzonspor	Gaziantep Stadium	
2025–26	Trabzonspor	2–1	Konyaspor	Antalya Stadium	23,646

== Performance by club ==
Club	Wins	Runners-up	Total finals	Winning %	Winning years	Loss %	Years runner-up
Galatasaray	19	5	24	79.17%	1963, 1964, 1965, 1966, 1973, 1976, 1982, 1985, 1991, 1993, 1996, 1999, 2000, 2005, 2014, 2015, 2016, 2019, 2025	20.83%	1969, 1980, 1994, 1995, 1998
Beşiktaş	11	6	17	64.71%	1975, 1989, 1990, 1994, 1998, 2006, 2007, 2009, 2011, 2021, 2024	35.29%	1966, 1977, 1984, 1993, 1999, 2002
Trabzonspor	10	8	18	55.56%	1977, 1978, 1984, 1992, 1995, 2003, 2004, 2010, 2020, 2026	44.44%	1975, 1976, 1985, 1990, 1997, 2013, 2024, 2025
Fenerbahçe	7	11	18	38.89%	1968, 1974, 1979, 1983, 2012, 2013, 2023	61.11%	1963, 1965, 1989, 1996, 2001, 2005, 2006, 2009, 2010, 2016, 2018
Altay	2	5	7	28.57%	1967, 1980	71.43%	1964, 1968, 1972, 1979, 1986
Ankaragücü	2	3	5	40%	1972, 1981	60%	1973, 1982, 1991
Gençlerbirliği	2	3	5	40%	1987, 2001	60%	2003, 2004, 2008
Göztepe	2	1	3	66.67%	1969, 1970	33.33%	1967
Kocaelispor	2	0	2	100%	1997, 2002	0%	–
Bursaspor	1	5	6	16.67%	1986	83.33%	1971, 1974, 1992, 2012, 2015
Eskişehirspor	1	3	4	25%	1971	75%	1970, 1987, 2014
Akhisarspor	1	1	2	50%	2018	50%	2019
Kayserispor	1	1	2	50%	2008	50%	2022
Konyaspor	1	1	2	50%	2017	50%	2026
Sakaryaspor	1	0	1	100%	1988	0%	–
Sivasspor	1	0	1	100%	2022	0%	–
İstanbul Başakşehir	0	3	3	0%	–	100%	2011, 2017, 2023
Antalyaspor	0	2	2	0%	–	100%	2000, 2021
Boluspor	0	1	1	0%	–	100%	1981
Kayseri Erciyesspor	0	1	1	0%	–	100%	2007
Adana Demirspor	0	1	1	0%	–	100%	1978
Mersin İdman Yurdu	0	1	1	0%	–	100%	1983
Samsunspor	0	1	1	0%	–	100%	1988
Alanyaspor	0	1	1	0%	–	100%	2020

== Finals venues and host cities ==
Host cities of the Turkish Cup final

Venue	Finals hosted	Last final	City	Finals hosted	Last final
BJK İnönü Stadium	21	1999	Istanbul	36	2024
Hüseyin Avni Aker Stadium	8	1997	Trabzon	8	1997
İzmir Atatürk Stadium	7	2009	İzmir	16	2023
Ali Sami Yen Stadium	7	1999	Istanbul	36	2024
İzmir Alsancak Stadium	7	1980	İzmir	16	2023
Ankara 19 Mayıs Stadium	7	2013	Ankara	7	2013
Bursa Atatürk Stadium	7	2015	Bursa	7	2015
Atatürk Olympic Stadium	5	2024	Istanbul	36	2024
Şükrü Saracoğlu Stadium	3	1996	Istanbul	36	2024
Eskişehir Atatürk Stadium	3	1987	Eskişehir	4	2017
Gürsel Aksel Stadium	2	2023	İzmir	16	2023
Kadir Has Stadium	1	2011	Kayseri	2	2011
Şanlıurfa GAP Stadium	1	2010	Şanlıurfa	1	2010
Antalya Atatürk Stadium	1	2003	Antalya	2	2016
Kayseri Atatürk Stadium	1	2001	Kayseri	2	2011
Diyarbakır Atatürk Stadium	1	2000	Diyarbakır	2	2018
İsmet Paşa Stadium	1	1997	İzmit	1	1997
Sakarya Atatürk Stadium	1	1988	Adapazarı	1	1988
Samsun 19 Mayıs Stadium	1	1988	Samsun	1	1988
Tevfik Sırrı Gür Stadium	1	1983	Mersin	1	1983
Bolu Atatürk Stadium	1	1981	Bolu	1	1981
Adana 5 Ocak Stadium	1	1978	Adana	1	1978
Konya Atatürk Stadium	1	2014	Konya	1	2014
New Antalya Stadium	1	2016	Antalya	2	2016
New Eskişehir Stadium	1	2017	Eskişehir	4	2017
Diyarbakır Stadium	1	2018	Diyarbakır	2	2018
Sivas 4 Eylül Stadium	1	2019	Sivas	1	2019
Gaziantep Stadium	1	2025	Gaziantep	1	2025

== Records ==
The winners of the Turkish Cup gain the right to wear a roundel of the Turkish flag on their shirt during the following season.

=== Most common finals matchups ===
Finals played	Team	Wins	Opponent	Wins
5	Galatasaray	1966, 1993, 1999	Beşiktaş	1994, 1998
5	Galatasaray	1963, 1965, 1996, 2005, 2016	Fenerbahçe	–
5	Beşiktaş	1975, 1990, 2024	Trabzonspor	1977, 1984
4	Galatasaray	1976, 1985, 2025	Trabzonspor	1995
3	Galatasaray	1973, 1982, 1991	Ankaragücü	–
3	Beşiktaş	1989, 2006, 2009	Fenerbahçe	–

=== Final ===
- Most wins: 19
  - Galatasaray (1963, 1964, 1965, 1966, 1973, 1976, 1982, 1985, 1991, 1993, 1996, 1999, 2000, 2005, 2014, 2015, 2016, 2019, 2025)
- Most consecutive titles: 4
  - Galatasaray (1963, 1964, 1965, 1966)
- Most consecutive appearances: 4
  - Galatasaray (1963, 1964, 1965, 1966 – all wins)
  - Trabzonspor (1975, 1976, 1977, 1978 – two wins)
  - Galatasaray (1993, 1994, 1995, 1996 – two wins)
- Most appearances: 24
  - Galatasaray (1963, 1964, 1965, 1966, 1969, 1973, 1976, 1980, 1982, 1985, 1991, 1993, 1994, 1995, 1996, 1998, 1999, 2000, 2005, 2014, 2015, 2016, 2019, 2025)
- Biggest win:
  - Gençlerbirliği 5–0 Eskişehirspor (1987)
- Most goals in a final: 8
  - Antalyaspor 3–5 Galatasaray (2000)
- Most goals by a losing side: 3
  - Antalyaspor 3–5 Galatasaray (2000)
- Most defeats in a final: 11
  - Fenerbahçe (1963, 1965, 1989, 1996, 2001, 2005, 2006, 2009, 2010, 2016, 2018)

=== Unbeaten ===
- Longest unbeaten run: 26 matches
  - Galatasaray, 1962–63 to 1966–67 (ended in the quarter-finals, second leg vs Altay)

=== Scorelines ===
- Biggest home win:
  - 14–2, İskenderun Demir Çelikspor vs Fidan Gençlik S.K., Round 2, 1980–81
- Biggest away win:
  - 1–10, Uşak Belediyespor vs Denizli B.S.K., Second round, 2012–13

== Individual records ==
=== All-time most appearances ===
Rank	Player	Apps	Years
1	(Turkey) Şenol Güneş	84	1973–1987
2	(Turkey) Turgay Semercioğlu	78	1973–1988
2	(Turkey) Necati Özçağlayan	78	1971–1986
2	(Turkey) Umut Bulut	78	2003–2024
5	(Turkey) Cüneyt Tanman	77	1974–1991
6	(Turkey) Mehmet Topuz	72	2000–2016
7	(Turkey) Rıza Çalımbay	71	1980–1996
8	(Turkey) Müjdat Yetkiner	70	1979–1995
8	(Turkey) Adem Koçak	70	2000–2022
10	(Turkey) Fatih Terim	69	1972–1985
10	(Turkey) Serkan Balcı	69	2000–2019
12	(Turkey) Cem Pamiroğlu	68	1976–1990
12	(Turkey) Mustafa Denizli	68	1967–1984
12	(Turkey) Hakan Şükür	68	1987–2008
12	(Turkey) Selçuk İnan	68	2002–2020
16	(Turkey) Oğuz Çetin	67	1982–2000
16	(Turkey) Olcan Adın	67	2002–2018

As of 25 May 2024

=== All-time top scorers ===
Rank	Player	Goals	Apps	Rate
1	(Brazil) Bobô	31	47	0.66
1	(Turkey) Hami Mandıralı	31	54	0.57
1	(Turkey) Umut Bulut	31	78	0.39
4	(Turkey) Fevzi Zemzem	30	40	0.75
4	(Turkey) Cemil Turan	30	55	0.55
4	(Turkey) Semih Şentürk	30	58	0.52
7	(Turkey) Tanju Çolak	26	39	0.67
8	(Turkey) Ümit Karan	25	43	0.58
8	(Turkey) Hakan Şükür	25	68	0.37
10	(Turkey) Ertuğrul Sağlam	24	42	0.57
10	(Turkey) Mustafa Denizli	24	68	0.35
12	(Turkey) Mehmet Yılmaz	23	34	0.68
12	(Brazil) Fernandão	23	40	0.58
14	(Turkey) Cenk Tosun	22	29	0.75
15	(Turkey) Necati Ateş	21	65	0.32

As of 25 May 2024

=== Managers ===
Manager	Titles	Winning years
(Turkey) Gündüz Kılıç	3	1963, 1965, 1966
(Turkey) Ahmet Suat Özyazıcı	3	1977, 1978, 1984
(Turkey) Aykut Kocaman	3	2012, 2013, 2017
(Turkey) Fatih Terim	3	1999, 2000, 2019
(Turkey) Okan Buruk	2	2018, 2025
(Turkey) Adnan Süvari	2	1969, 1970
(England) Gordon Milne	2	1989, 1990
(Turkey) Samet Aybaba	2	2001, 2003
(France) Jean Tigana	2	2006, 2007
(Turkey) Mustafa Denizli	2	1991, 2009
(Turkey) Şenol Güneş	2	1995, 2010

=== Players with most titles ===
(at least five titles)

Player	Titles	Winning years	Clubs
(Turkey) Bülent Korkmaz	6	1991, 1993, 1996, 1999, 2000, 2005	all with Galatasaray
(Turkey) Hakan Şükür	6	1988, 1993, 1996, 1999, 2000, 2005	Sakaryaspor (1), Galatasaray (5)
(Turkey) Uğur Köken	5	1963, 1964, 1965, 1966, 1973	all with Galatasaray
(Turkey) Arif Erdem	5	1993, 1996, 1999, 2000, 2005	all with Galatasaray
(Uruguay) Fernando Muslera	5	2014, 2015, 2016, 2019, 2025	all with Galatasaray
(Turkey) Okan Buruk	5	1993, 1996, 1999, 2000, 2006	Galatasaray (4), Beşiktaş (1)

== See also ==
- Turkish Super Cup
