= Erkan Avseren =

Turkish footballer and manager

Personal information
- Full name: Erkan Avseren
- Date of birth: 1 July 1971 (age 55)
- Place of birth: Istanbul, Turkey
- Height: 1.79 m (5 ft 10 in)
- Position: Defender

Senior career*
Years	Team	Apps	(Gls)
1990–1991	Fenerbahçe	0	(0)
1991	→ Gönenspor (loan)	13	(0)
1991–1992	Malatyaspor	30	(1)
1992–1994	Boluspor	48	(2)
1993	→ Malatyaspor (loan)	13	(0)
1994–1996	Vanspor	15	(1)
1996–1999	Beşiktaş	81	(6)
1999–2001	Siirtspor	39	(1)
2001	→ Diyarbakırspor (loan)	10	(0)
2001–2003	Kayserispor	30	(1)
Total		206	(12)

International career
1995–1996	Turkey	5	(0)

Managerial career
- 2012–2014: Beşiktaş U21
- 2019: Afyonspor
- * Club domestic league appearances and goals

Erkan Avseren (born 1 July 1971) is a Turkish former footballer and current manager who was most recently the head coach of Afyonspor.

Started his professional career at Fenerbahçe, Avseren played in varied Turkish clubs including Beşiktaş and Kayserispor. Avseren capped 5 times for Turkey between 1995 and 1996.

== Honours ==
=== Club ===
Beşiktaş J.K.

- Turkish Super Cup: 1998
