= Mustafa Gürsel =

Turkish footballer

Personal information
- Date of birth: 6 November 1974 (age 51)
- Place of birth: Kırklareli, Turkey
- Height: 1.83 m (6 ft 0 in)
- Position: Midfielder

Team information
- Current team: Vanspor (head coach)

Senior career*
Years	Team	Apps	(Gls)
1996–2002	Antalyaspor	191	(25)
2002–2005	Gençlerbirliği	57	(10)
2004	→ Bursaspor (loan)	17	(3)
2005–2007	Antalyaspor	66	(4)
2007–2008	Elâzığspor	27	(2)
2008–2009	Pendikspor	16	(1)
Total		374	(45)

Managerial career
- 2020–2021: Kasımpaşa (assistant)
- 2021–2022: Bandırmaspor
- 2023–2024: Ümraniyespor
- 2024: Kocaelispor
- 2024–2026: Bandırmaspor
- 2026: Esenler Erokspor
- 2026–: Vanspor
- * Club domestic league appearances and goals

Mustafa Gürsel (born 6 November 1974) is a Turkish football manager and former professional footballer who played as a midfielder. He is the head coach of Vanspor in the 1. Lig.

== Playing career ==
Gürsel began his professional playing career in 1996 with Antalyaspor, where he played for six seasons. In 2002, he joined Gençlerbirliği. He later spent a brief period on loan at Bursaspor in 2004. In 2005, he returned to Antalyaspor for two more seasons before moving to Elâzığspor in 2007. He concluded his playing career at Pendikspor in 2009.

== Coaching career ==
After retiring, Gürsel transitioned into coaching. After working as an assistant manager at Kasımpaşa from 2020, in 2021, he was appointed head coach of Bandırmaspor, managing the team until 2022. He later coached Ümraniyespor from 2023 to 2024 and had a brief stint with Kocaelispor later that year.

On 1 July 2024, he returned to Bandırmaspor, where he continues to serve as head coach.
