= 2001–02 Trabzonspor season =

Trabzonspor
2001–02 season
- Chairman: Özkan Sümer
- Manager: Hans-Peter Briegel
- Süper Lig: 14th
- Turkish Cup: Quarter final

The Trabzonspor football club's 2001–02 season was its 27th consecutive season in Turkey's Süper Lig.

== Season summary ==
Trabzonspor finished in 14th place, only three points above the relegation level, the club's the worst-ever rank in the league. The club's −11 goal average was also the worst goal average for the club during its time in Süper Lig.

== Squad ==
Note: Flags indicate national team as defined under FIFA eligibility rules; some limited exceptions apply. Players may hold more than one non-FIFA nationality.

No.	Pos.	Nation	Player
1	GK	TUR	Metin Aktaş
2	DF	PER	Santiago Salazar
3	DF	TUR	Mustafa Güven
4	DF	TUR	Güngör Öztürk
5	DF	TUR	Osman Özköylü
6	DF	BRA	Eduardo Suísso
7	DF	TUR	Erhan Namlı
8	MF	BEL	Hans Somers
9	MF	TUR	Şenol Erol
10	FW	TUR	Hami Mandıralı
11	MF	TUR	Erman Özgür
13	MF	BRA	Marcio Jarro
14	DF	TUR	Gökhan Kolomoç
15	MF	TUR	Mehmet Aurélio
17	MF	BRA	Robson da Silva
19	MF	TUR	Ferdi Serdar
20	DF	GHA	Patrick Villars

No.	Pos.	Nation	Player
21	GK	TUR	Murat Yiğiter
23	MF	TUR	Mustafa Ramazan
24	DF	TUR	Tayfun Cora
25	DF	TUR	Mehmet Kahriman
26	FW	ALB	Alban Bushi
27	DF	TUR	Feridun Sungur
33	GK	TUR	Osman Kurtuldu
34	DF	TUR	Cem Beceren
35	GK	TUR	Bülent Ataman (on loan from Göztepe)
36	DF	NGA	Augistine James
37	MF	TUR	Zafer Demiray
49	DF	TUR	Kürşat Duymuş (on loan from Rizespor)
55	DF	BUL	Georgi Markov (on loan from Levski Sofia)
61	MF	TUR	Gökdeniz Karadeniz
62	DF	TUR	Kenan Baskan
67	MF	TUR	Hasan Üçüncü
70	MF	TUR	Nuri Yılmaz

== Transfers ==
=== In ===
#	Pos.	Player	Transferred from	Transfer Type	Fee	Date	Ref.
1	-	(Albania) Alban Bushaj	İstanbulspor	Transfer	-	15 January 2002	
2	-	(Brazil) Eduardo Suisso De Novaes	-	Transfer	-	20 June 2001	
3	-	(Turkey) Gökhan Kolomoç	Mersin İdman Yurdu	Was hired. Came back.	-	3 July 2001	
4	-	(Belgium) Hans Somers	K. Lierse SK	Transfer	-	11 July 2001	
5	-	(Turkey) Hasan Üçüncü	Akçaabat Sebatspor	Was hired. Came back.	-	4 July 2001	
6	-	(Brazil) Marcio Moreira Jarro	-	Transfer	-	20 June 2001	
7	-	(Brazil) (Turkey) Mehmet Aurélio	Olaria Atlético Clube	Transfer	-	20 June 2001	
8	-	(Turkey) Mehmet Kahraman	-	-	-	-	
9	-	(Turkey) Nuri Yılmaz	Arsinspor	Was hired. Came back.	-	-	
10	-	(Ghana) Patrick Villars	Ebusua Dwarfs	Transfer	-	17 August 2001	-
11	-	(Brazil) Robson da Silva Ourique	Olaria Atlético Clube	Transfer	-	20 June 2001	
12	-	(Peru) Santiago Roberto Salazar	Sporting Cristal	Transfer	-	5 July 2001	
13	-	(Turkey) Şenol Erol	Mezitlispor	Transfer	-	15 August 2001	

=== Out ===
#	Pos.	Player	Transferred to	Transfer Type	Fee	Date	Ref.
1	-	(Turkey) Abdülkadir Demirci	Malatyaspor	Transfer	-	3 August 2001	
2	-	(Germany) Alexander Löbe	Malatyaspor	Transfer	-	15 August 2001	
3	MF	(Turkey) Ali Rıza Sergen Yalçın	Galatasaray	Was hired. Went back.	-	12 July 2001	
4	-	(Turkey) Erhan Namlı	Galatasaray	Transfer	-	10 October 2001	
5	-	(North Macedonia) İgor Sasa Nikolovski	K. Lierse SK	Transfer	-	-	
6	-	(Turkey) Mehmet İpek	Malatyaspor	Transfer	-	3 August 2001	
7	-	(Turkey) Murat Bölükbaş	Akçaabat Sebatspor	Transfer	-	17 August 2001	-
8	-	(Turkey) Nesim Özgür	Malatyaspor	Transfer	-	3 August 2001	-
9	-	(Turkey) Nuri Yılmaz	Gümüşhane Doğanspor	Hired	-	24 January 2002	
10	FW	(Turkey) Oktay Derelioğlu	Fenerbahçe	Transfer	-	25 July 2001	
11	FW	(Turkey) Orhan Çıkırıkçı	Akçaabat Sebatspor	Hired	-	-	
12	GK	(North Macedonia) Petar Miloševski	Malatyaspor	Transfer	-	3 August 2001	
13	-	(Norway) Rune Lange	Club Brugge KV	Transfer	-	-	
14	-	(Turkey) Tamer Tuna	Beşiktaş	Transfer	-	27 September 2001	
15	-	(Bulgaria) Todor Dimitrov Yanchev	Kallithea FC	Transfer	-	-	
16	-	(Turkey) Ufuk Ali	Akçaabat Sebatspor	Transfer	-	8 August 2001	
17	-	(North Macedonia) Zarko Serafimovski	Hapoel Be'er Sheva F.C.	Transfer	-	-	

== League table ==
Pos	Team	Pld	W	D	L	GF	GA	GD	Pts	Qualification or relegation
12	Diyarbakırspor	34	10	10	14	41	50	−9	40 (Note: Diyarbakırspor were ahead of Malatyaspor and Trabzonspor on head-to-head points: Diyarbakırspor: 10 pts, Malatyaspor: 5 pts, Trabzonspor: 1 pts.)	
13	Malatyaspor	34	11	7	16	34	50	−16	40	
14	Trabzonspor	34	11	7	16	49	60	−11	40	
15	Samsunspor	34	10	8	16	32	43	−11	38	
16	Çaykur Rizespor (R)	34	9	10	15	43	51	−8	37 (Note: Çaykur Rizespor were ahead of Antalyaspor on head-to-head away goals scored: Çaykur Rizespor–Antalyaspor 1–1, Antalyaspor–Çaykur Rizespor 2–2.)	Relegation to Turkish Second League Category A

Rules for classification: 1) points; 2) goal difference; 3) number of goals scored.
(R) Relegated

== Scorers ==
#	Player	Süper Lig	Turkish Cup	Total
1	(Brazil) Robson da Silva Ourique	9	2	11
2	(Brazil) (Turkey) Mehmet Aurélio	9	0	9
3	(Turkey) Zafer Demiray	7	1	8
4	(Turkey) Hami Mandıralı	4	1	5
4	(Belgium) Hans Somers	5	0	5
6	(Turkey) Gökdeniz Karadeniz	4	0	4
7	(Turkey) Osman Özköylü	3	0	3
8	(Turkey) Cem Beceren	2	0	2
8	(Turkey) Erman Özgür	2	0	2
8	(Turkey) Hasan Üçüncü	1	1	2
11	(Turkey) Mustafa Macit Güven	1	0	1

== Süper Lig games ==
=== First half ===
10 August 2001 1st week	Beşiktaş	1–2	Trabzonspor	Istanbul
20:04	(Turkey) Ahmet Dursun 59'	Report	(Turkey) Zafer Demiray 44' (Brazil) Robson da Silva Ourique 87'	Stadium: BJK İnönü Stadium; Referee: Mustafa Çulcu

19 August 2001 2nd week	Trabzonspor	2–1	Gaziantepspor	Trabzon
19:00	(Turkey) Hami Mandıralı 82' (Turkey) Gökdeniz Karadeniz 89'	Report	(Turkey) Kemal Aslan 88'	Stadium: Hüseyin Avni Aker Stadium; Referee: Muhittin Boşat

24 August 2001 3rd week	Trabzonspor	5–0	Bursaspor	Trabzon
20:00	(Belgium) Hans Somers 43' (Turkey) Hami Mandıralı 51' (Brazil) (Turkey) Mehmet Aurélio 57' (Brazil) Robson da Silva Ourique 65', 72'		–	Stadium: Hüseyin Avni Aker Stadium; Referee: Erol Ersoy

8 September 2001 4th week	Diyarbakırspor	3–1	Trabzonspor	Diyarbakır
19:00	(Turkey) Murat Alaçayır 53' (Turkey) Alp Küçükvardar 74' (Democratic Republic of the Congo) Andre Ngole Kona 86'		(Brazil) (Turkey) Mehmet Aurélio 25 (pen.)'	Stadium: Diyarbakır Atatürk Stadium; Referee: Murat Ilgaz

16 September 2001 5th week	Trabzonspor	1–2	Samsunspor	Trabzon
19:00	(Brazil) Robson da Silva Ourique 49'		(Turkey) Ertuğrul Sağlam 8' (Turkey) Mehmet Yılmaz 26'	Stadium: Hüseyin Avni Aker Stadium; Referee: Serdar Tatlı

23 September 2001 6th week	İstanbulspor	2–1	Trabzonspor	Istanbul
19:00	(Turkey) Mehmet Yozgatlı 27' (Turkey) Osman Özköylü 53 (k.k.)'		(Brazil) (Turkey) Mehmet Aurélio 16 (pen.)'	Stadium: BJK İnönü Stadium; Referee: Erol Ersoy

28 September 2001 7th week	Trabzonspor	2–2	Ankaragücü	Trabzon
20:00	(Turkey) Cem Beceren 18' (Brazil) (Turkey) Mehmet Aurélio 31 (pen.)'		(Ghana) Augustine Ahinful 8 (pen.)' (Brazil) Rogerio de Jesus Nascimento Albuquerque 26'	Stadium: Hüseyin Avni Aker Stadium; Referee: Mustafa Çulcu

13 October 2001 8th week	Kocaelispor	1–0	Trabzonspor	İzmit
19:00	(Poland) (Turkey) Roman Dabrowski 86'		–	Stadium: İsmetpaşa Stadium; Referee: Metin Tokat

20 October 2001 9th week	Trabzonspor	2–0	Yimpaş Yozgatspor	Trabzon
19:00	(Brazil) Robson da Silva Ourique 3'; Zafer Demiray 87'		–	Stadium: Hüseyin Avni Aker Stadium; Referee: Zafer Önder İpek

27 October 2001 10th week	Galatasaray	3–1	Trabzonspor	Istanbul
19:00	(Turkey) Serkan Aykut 21 (pen.)', 59 (pen.)' (Turkey) Arif Erdem 41'		(Turkey) Mustafa Macit Güven 34'	Stadium: Ali Sami Yen Stadium; Referee: Mutlu Çelik

4 November 2001 11th week	Trabzonspor	2–2	Denizlispor	Trabzon
19:00	(Turkey) Zafer Demiray 15' (Brazil) Robson da Silva Ourique 19'		(Turkey) Muzaffer Bilazer 85 (pen.)' (Turkey) Coşkun Birdal 90'	Stadium: Hüseyin Avni Aker Stadium; Referee: Ali Uluyol

17 November 2001 12th week	Çaykur Rizespor	1–1	Trabzonspor	Rize
13:30	(Turkey) Koray Avcı 25'		(Turkey) Zafer Demiray 63'	Stadium: Rize Atatürk Stadium; Referee: Metin Tokat

24 November 2001 13th week	Trabzonspor	2–0	Antalyaspor	Trabzon
13:30	(Brazil) Robson da Silva Ourique 58' (Turkey) Hasan Üçüncü 73'		–	Stadium: Hüseyin Avni Aker Stadium; Referee: Ferhat Gündoğdu

2 December 2001 14th week	Malatyaspor	1–0	Trabzonspor	Malatya
13:30	(Turkey) Fazlı Ulusoy 54'		–	Stadium: Malatya İnönü Stadium; Referee: Erol Ersoy

8 December 2001 15th week	Trabzonspor	2–1	Fenerbahçe	Trabzon
19:00	(Turkey) Zafer Demiray 28', 50'		(Ghana) Samuel Johnson 88'	Stadium: Hüseyin Avni Aker Stadium; Referee: Serdar Tatlı

16 December 2001 16th week	Gençlerbirliği	1–1	Trabzonspor	Ankara
13:30	(Turkey) İsmail Güldüren 90 (pen.)'	Report	(Turkey) Erman Özgür 47'	Stadium: Ankara 19 Mayıs Stadium; Referee: Orhan Erdemir

22 December 2001 17th week	Trabzonspor	3–0	Göztepe	Trabzon
13:30	(Turkey) Cem Beceren 23' (Turkey) Hami Mandıralı 28' (Turkey) Gökdeniz Karadeniz 64'	Report	–	Stadium: Hüseyin Avni Aker Stadium; Referee: Mustafa Çulcu

=== Second half ===
20 January 2002 18th week	Trabzonspor	0 – 5 (Note: The game was abandoned in the 85th minute while Beşiktaş was leading 5–0. A two-game field closure penalty was given to Trabzonspor. These penalties applied in the Süper Lig game against Diyarbakırspor and in the Turkish Cup game against Denizlispor.)	Beşiktaş	Trabzon
19:00	–	Report	(Turkey) Tümer Metin 17' (Turkey) Ahmet Dursun 49' (Turkey) İlhan Mansız 57' (Brazil) Ronaldo Guiaro 80 (pen.)' (Russia) Dmitriy Hlestov 81'	Stadium: Hüseyin Avni Aker Stadium; Referee: Serdar Tatlı

23 January 2002 19th week	Gaziantepspor	5–2	Trabzonspor	Gaziantep
13:30	(Brazil) Júlio César da Silva e Souza 4' (Turkey) Halit Köprülü 14' (Turkey) Kemal Aslan 16' (Turkey) Fatih Tekke 28' (Brazil) Viola 90'	Report	(Turkey) İbrahim Toraman 32 (k.k.)' (Belgium) Hans Somers 57'	Stadium: Kâmil Ocak Stadium; Referee: Erol Ersoy

27 January 2002 20th week	Bursaspor	2–2	Trabzonspor	Bursa
13:30	(Turkey) Murat Hacıoğlu 68' (Turkey) Alp Küçükvardar 89'	Report	(Turkey) Zafer Demiray 31' (Brazil) (Turkey) Mehmet Aurélio 64 (pen.)'	Stadium: Bursa Atatürk Stadium; Referee: Sadık İlhan

2 February 2002 21st week	Trabzonspor	0 – 2 (Note: Due to the events during the game against Beşiktaş on 20 January 2002, this game was played in Kocaeli.)	Diyarbakırspor	İzmit
13:30	–	Report	(Turkey) Celaleddin Koçak 23' (Turkey) Önder Deniz Kolgu 66 (pen.)'	Stadium: İsmetpaşa Stadium; Referee: Ünsal Çimen

10 February 2002 22nd week	Samsunspor	1–2	Trabzonspor	Samsun
20:00	(Turkey) Mehmet Hocaoğlu 81'	Report	(Belgium) Hans Somers 37' (Brazil) (Turkey) Mehmet Aurélio 64'	Stadium: Samsun 19 Mayıs Stadium; Referee: Sadık İlhan

17 February 2002 23rd week	Trabzonspor	2–0	İstanbulspor	Trabzon
13:30	(Brazil) (Turkey) Mehmet Aurélio 1', 51'	Report	–	Stadium: Hüseyin Avni Aker Stadium; Referee: Kuddusi Müftüoğlu

24 February 2002 24th week	Ankaragücü	4–2	Trabzonspor	Ankara
13:30	(Turkey) Faruk Namdar 27', 52' (Turkey) Hüseyin Kartal 33' (Ghana) Augustine Ahinful 68'		(Belgium) Hans Somers 43', 57'	Stadium: Ankara 19 Mayıs Stadium; Referee: Ünsal Çimen

2 March 2002 25th week	Trabzonspor	1–2	Kocaelispor	Trabzon
13:30	(Turkey) Hami Mandıralı 25 (pen.)'	Report	(Poland) (Turkey) Roman Dabrowski 27', 28'	Stadium: Hüseyin Avni Aker Stadium; Referee: Selçuk Dereli

9 March 2002 26th week	Yimpaş Yozgatspor	2–3	Trabzonspor	Yozgat
13:30	(Turkey) İlhan Özbay 84', 89'	Report	(Brazil) (Turkey) Mehmet Aurélio 33' (Turkey) Gökdeniz Karadeniz 42', 88'	Stadium: Yozgat Şehir Stadium; Referee: Muhittin Boşat

23 March 2002 28th week	Denizlispor	2–1	Trabzonspor	Denizli
14:30	(Turkey) Timuçin Bayazıt 44' (Turkey) Veysel Cihan 67'	Report	(Turkey) Osman Özköylü 4'	Stadium: Denizli Atatürk Stadium; Referee: Kuddusi Müftüoğlu

30 March 2002 29th week	Trabzonspor	2–1	Çaykur Rizespor	Trabzon
14:30	(Brazil) Robson da Silva Ourique 5' (Turkey) Osman Özköylü 78'	Report	(Turkey) Koray Avcı 47 (pen.)'	Stadium: Hüseyin Avni Aker Stadium; Referee: Muhittin Boşat

3 April 2002 27th week	Trabzonspor	0 – 2 (Note: This game was to be played on 15–17 March 2002, but due to Galatasaray's European cup game, this game was played on 3 April instead.)	Galatasaray	Trabzon
19:00	–	Report	(Turkey) Arif Erdem 13' (Turkey) Hasan Şaş 88'	Stadium: Hüseyin Avni Aker Stadium; Referee: Bülent Uzun

7 April 2002 30th week	Antalyaspor	4–2	Trabzonspor	Antalya
14:30	(Turkey) Saffet Akyüz 11', 45', 90' (Turkey) Mustafa Gürsel 25'	Report	(Brazil) Robson da Silva Ourique 70' (Turkey) Erman Özgür 79'	Stadium: Antalya Atatürk Stadium; Referee: Kadir Tozlu

12 April 2002 31st week	Trabzonspor	0–0	Malatyaspor	Trabzon
20:00	–		–	Stadium: Hüseyin Avni Aker Stadium; Referee: Mustafa Çulcu

21 April 2002 32nd week	Fenerbahçe	3–0	Trabzonspor	Istanbul
19:00	(Israel) Haim Revivo 55', 83' (Turkey) Serhat Akın 60'		–	Stadium: Fenerbahçe Şükrü Saracoğlu Stadium; Referee: Kuddusi Müftüoğlu

27 April 2002 33rd week	Trabzonspor	0–0	Gençlerbirliği	Trabzon
15:30	–	Report	–	Stadium: Hüseyin Avni Aker Stadium; Referee: Kazım Erçakır

3 May 2002 34th Week	Göztepe	4–2	Trabzonspor	İzmir
20:00	(Turkey) Servet Çetin 5' (Turkey) Cumhur Bozacı 15' (South Africa) Helman Mkhalele 35' (Turkey) Mustafa Özkan 55'	Report	(Turkey) Zafer Uysal 6 (k.k.)' (Turkey) Osman Özköylü 23'	Stadium: Altay Alsancak Stadium; Referee: İbrahim Çınar

== Turkish Cup games ==
28 November 2001 3rd round	İstanbul BBSK	1–2	Trabzonspor	Çetin Emeç Stadium, Istanbul
12:30	(Turkey) Mustafa Macit Güven 18 (k.k.)'	-	(Brazil) Robson da Silva Ourique 45', 53'	Referee: Sebahattin Şahin

12 December 2001 4th round	Trabzonspor	3–0	Samsunspor	Hüseyin Avni Aker Stadium, Trabzon
12:30	(Turkey) Hami Mandıralı 11 (pen.)' (Turkey) Hasan Üçüncü 23' (Turkey) Zafer Demiray 73'	-	-	Referee: Musa Eryılmaz

5 February 2002 Quarter final	Trabzonspor	0–1	Denizlispor	BJK İnönü Stadium, Istanbul (Note: Due to the events during the game against Beşiktaş on 20 January 2002, this game was played in İstanbul.)
20:00	-	-	(Turkey) Coşkun Birdal 42'	Referee: Musa Eryılmaz

== Sources ==
- Turkish Football Federation
- Trabzonspor Official Site
- MAÇKOLİK
