= 1999–2000 Trabzonspor season =

Trabzonspor
1999–2000 season
- Chairman: Mehmet Ali Yılmaz
- Manager: Ahmet Suat Özyaczcı; Giray Bulak
- 1. Lig: 6th
- Turkish Cup: Quarter-finals

1999–2000 Trabzonspor season was the 25th consecutive season that the club played in the 1. Lig.

== Season summary ==
Trabzonspor finished 6th the 1999–2000 season. Trabzonspor was included in the Turkish Cup from 3rd round. Galatasaray defeated Trabzonspor 2 – 1 in Trabzon in quarter finals. Trabzonspor could not qualify to play in any European cup games for the 1999–2000 season.

== Squad ==
Note: Flags indicate national team as defined under FIFA eligibility rules; some limited exceptions apply. Players may hold more than one non-FIFA nationality.

No.	Pos.	Nation	Player
—		TUR	Abdülkadir Demirci
—		TUR	Bülent Uygun
—		TUR	Cem Beceren
—	FW	CRO	Davor Vugrinec
—		GHA	Emmanuel Tetteh
—	FW	TUR	Erman Özgür
—		TUR	Erol Bulut
—	FW	TUR	Fatih Tekke
—	MF	TUR	Gökdeniz Karadeniz
10	FW	TUR	Hami Mandıralı
—		TUR	Hüseyin Çimşir
—		MKD	Igor Sasa Nikolovski
—		TUR	Mehmet İpek
—	GK	TUR	Metin Aktaş
—		TUR	Murat Bölükbaş
—		TUR	Murat Deniz

No.	Pos.	Nation	Player
—		TUR	Mustafa Macit Güven
—		TUR	Nesim Özgür
—		TUR	Okan Çebi
—		TUR	Okan Özke
—	FW	TUR	Orhan Çıkırıkçı
—		TUR	Osman Kurtuldu
—	DF	TUR	Osman Özköylü
—	GK	MKD	Petar Miloševski
—		BRA	Rogério Oliveira da Costa
—	FW	TUR	Selahattin Kınalı
—		TUR	Selim Özer
—		TUR	Tamer Tuna
—		TUR	Tansel Başer
—		TUR	Ufuk Ali
—		TUR	Yusuf Tokaç

== Transfers ==
=== In ===
#	Pos.	Player	Transferred from	Transfer type	Fee	Date	Ref.
1	-	(Turkey) Abdülkadir Demirci	Gaziantepspor	Transfer	-	6 July 1999	
2	FW	(Turkey) Bülent Uygun	Çanakkale Dardanelspor	Transfer	-	29 July 1999	
3	-	(Turkey) Cem Beceren	Gaziantepspor	Transfer	-	6 July 1999	
4	-	(Ghana) Emmanuel Tetteh	Vanspor	Transfer	-	30 November 1999	
5	-	(Turkey) Erman Özgür	Çanakkale Dardanelspor	Transfer	-	6 July 1999	
6	-	(Turkey) Erol Bulut	Fenerbahçe	Transfer	-	10 Aralık 1999	
7	-	(Turkey) Hami Mandıralı	FC Schalke 04	Transfer	-	12 July 1999	
8	-	(Turkey) Hüseyin Çimşir	Sakaryaspor	Was hired. Returned.	-	-	
9	-	(North Macedonia) (Belgium) Igor Sasa Nikolovski	Sakaryaspor	Transfer	-	7 July 1999	
10	-	(Turkey) Murat Bölükbaş	Fenerbahçe	Transfer	-	16 June 1999	
11	-	(Turkey) Nesim Özgür	İstanbulspor	Transfer	-	20 July 1999	
12	FW	(Brazil) Rogério Oliveira da Costa	FK Pobeda	Transfer	-	-	
13	-	(Turkey) Tamer Tuna	Çanakkale Dardanelspor	Transfer	-	12 July 1999	
14	-	(Turkey) Ufuk Ali	Trabzonspor (youth team)	Professional debut	-	30 July 1999	
15	-	(Turkey) Yusuf Tokaç	Beşiktaş	Transfer	-	9 July 1999	

=== Out ===
#	Pos.	Player	Transferred to	Transfer type	Fee	Date	Ref.
1	DF	(Turkey) Abdullah Ercan	Fenerbahçe	Transfer	-	7 June 1999	
2	-	(Turkey) Ahmet Yılmazer	Akçaabat Sebatspor	Transfer	-	13 August 1999	
3	-	(Turkey) Birol Güneş	Eskişehirspor	Transfer	-	1 September 1999	
4	FW	(Turkey) Çetin Güner	FC Basel	Loan	-	-	
5	-	(Turkey) Dilaver Satılmış	FC Luzern	Transfer	-	-	
6	-	(Turkey) Erdal Eraşkın	-	-	-	-	
7	-	(Turkey) Feti Okuroğlu	İzmirspor	Transfer	-	-	
8	-	(Turkey) Gökhan Kolomoç	Mersin İdman Yurdu	Loan	-	21 October 1999	
9	-	(Czech Republic) Karel Rada	SK Slavia Prague	Transfer	-	-	
10	FW	(England) Kevin Campbell	Everton F.C.	Transfer	-	-	
11	-	(Turkey) Mehmet Zengin	Çanakkale Dardanelspor	Transfer	-	5 August 1999	
12	-	(Turkey) Ogün Temizkanoğlu	Fenerbahçe	Transfer	-	8 June 1999	
13	DF	(Turkey) Recep Çetin	İstanbulspor	Transfer	-	21 December 1999	
14	-	(Turkey) Seyit Cem Ünsal	Vanspor	Loan	-	14 January 2000	
15	MF	(Turkey) Ünal Karaman	Ankaragücü	Transfer	-	29 July 1999	
16	FW	(Ukraine) Yuriy Kalitvintsev	FC Arsenal Kyiv	Transfer	-	-	

== League table ==
Pos	Team	Pld	W	D	L	GF	GA	GD	Pts
4	Fenerbahçe	34	17	10	7	59	44	+15	61
5	Gençlerbirliği	34	16	8	10	57	47	+10	56
6	Trabzonspor	34	15	8	11	47	41	+6	53
7	Samsunspor	34	16	4	14	51	43	+8	52
8	Denizlispor	34	13	8	13	55	57	−2	47

Rules for classification: 1) points; 2) goal difference; 3) number of goals scored.

== Scorers ==
#	Player	1 .Lig	Turkish Cup	Total
1	(Turkey) Hami Mandıralı	13	3	16
2	(Turkey) Abdülkadir Demirci	9	–	9
3	(Croatia) Davor Vugrinec	5	2	7
4	(Turkey) Osman Özköylü	4	–	4
5	(Turkey) Erman Özgür	3	–	3
5	(Turkey) Orhan Çıkırıkçı	2	1	3
5	(Turkey) Tamer Tuna	3	–	3
8	(Turkey) Fatih Tekke	2	–	2
8	(Turkey) Murat Bölükbaş	2	–	2
10	(Turkey) Nesim Özgür	1	–	1
10	(Brazil) Rogério Oliveira da Costa	1	–	1
10	(Turkey) Selahattin Kınalı	1	–	1

=== Hat-tricks ===
#	Player	Game	Category	Date
1	(Turkey) Hami Mandıralı	Trabzonspor 3 – 1 Göztepe	Turkish Cup	15 December 1999

== 1. lig games ==
=== 1st half ===
8 August 1999 1. Week	Adanaspor	1–2	Trabzonspor	Adana
19:00	(Turkey) Ahmet Oğuz Çetin 60'	Report	(Turkey) Erman Özgür 18', 31'	Stadium: Adana 5 Ocak Stadium; Referee: Murat Ilgaz

15 August 1999 2. Week	Trabzonspor	1–2	Galatasaray	Trabzon
19:00	(Turkey) Hami Mandıralı 45' (pen.)	Report	(Turkey) Emre Belözoğlu 15' (Romania) Gheorghe Hagi 31'	Stadium: Hüseyin Avni Aker Stadium; Referee: Erol Ersoy

10 September 1999 3. Week	Antalyaspor	0–2	Trabzonspor	Antalya
20:00		Report	(Croatia) Davor Vugrinec 79' (Turkey) Hami Mandıralı 89'	Stadium: Antalya Atatürk Stadium; Referee: Muhittin Boşat

18 August 1999 4. Week	Trabzonspor	2–0	Bursaspor	Trabzon
19:00	(Brazil) Rogério Oliveira da Costa 40' (Turkey) Hami Mandıralı 87'	Report		Stadium: Hüseyin Avni Aker Stadium; Referee: Metin Tokat

26 September 1999 5. Week	Göztepe	1–1	Trabzonspor	İzmir
19:00	(Turkey) Kurthan Yılmaz 27' (pen.)	Report	(Croatia) Davor Vugrinec 68'	Stadium: İzmir Atatürk Stadium; Referee: Serdar Çakır

16 October 1999 6. Week	Trabzonspor	2–0	Fenerbahçe	Trabzon
19:00	(Turkey) Osman Özköylü 2' (Croatia) Davor Vugrinec 80'	Report		Stadium: Hüseyin Avni Aker Stadium; Referee: Bülent Uzun

24 October 1999 7. Week	Erzurumspor	2–1	Trabzonspor	Erzurum
14:00	(Turkey) Alparslan Tice 2' (Turkey) Coşkun Birdal 62'	Report	(Croatia) Davor Vugrinec 32'	Stadium: Cemal Gürsel Stadium; Referee: Orhan Erdemir

31 October 1999 8. Week	Trabzonspor	1–2	Gençlerbirliği	Trabzon
19:00	(Turkey) Hami Mandıralı 84'	Report	(Turkey) Metin Akçevre 24' (pen.) (South Africa) Alfred Maimane Phiri 75'	Stadium: Hüseyin Avni Aker Stadium; Referee: Musa Eryılmaz

21 November 1999 9. Week	Beşiktaş	1–1	Trabzonspor	Istanbul
19:00	(Turkey) Ahmet Dursun 51'	Report	(Turkey) Selahattin Kınalı 47'	Stadium: BJK İnönü Stadium; Referee: Oğuz Sarvan

28 November 1999 10. Week	Trabzonspor	1–1	Denizlispor	Trabzon
19:00	(Turkey) Hami Mandıralı 82' (pen.)	Report	(Turkey) Engin Şentürk 78'	Stadium: Hüseyin Avni Aker Stadium; Referee: Ünsal Çimen

5 December 1999 11. Week	Vanspor	2–2	Trabzonspor	Van
12:30	(Sierra Leone) Mohamed Sillah 47' (Turkey) Ercüment Şahin 78'	Report	(Turkey) Orhan Çıkırıkçı 37' (Turkey) Murat Bölükbaş 70'	Stadium: Vali Mahmut Yılbaş Stadium; Referee: Serdar Tatlı

12 December 1999 12. Week	Trabzonspor	1–0	Kocaelispor	Trabzon
13:00	(Turkey) Hami Mandıralı 63'	Report		Stadium: Hüseyin Avni Aker Stadium; Referee: Murat Ilgaz

19 December 1999 13. Week	Altay	3–1	Trabzonspor	İzmir
14:04	(Turkey) Hasan Özer 7', 47' (Turkey) Özkan Koçtürk 65'	Report	(Turkey) Abdülkadir Demirci 90'	Stadium: Altay Alsancak Stadium; Referee: Metin Tokat

26 December 1999 14. Week	Trabzonspor	1–1	İstanbulspor	Trabzon
13:00	(Turkey) Abdülkadir Demirci 47'	Report	(Turkey) İlkan Aksoy 46'	Stadium: Hüseyin Avni Aker Stadium; Referee: Sebahattin Şahin

9 January 2000 15. Week	Trabzonspor	0–0	Gaziantepspor	Trabzon
13:30		Report		Stadium: Hüseyin Avni Aker Stadium; Referee: İbrhim Aksoy

14 January 2000 16. Week	Samsunspor	0–0	Trabzonspor	Samsun
20:00		Report		Stadium: Samsun 19 Mayıs Stadium; Referee: Muhittin Boşat

23 January 2000 17. Week	Trabzonspor	3–1	Ankaragücü	Trabzon
13:30	(Turkey) Tamer Tuna 28' (Turkey) Nesim Özgür 46' (Turkey) Abdülkadir Demirci 83'	Report	(Turkey) Hakan Keleş 79'	Stadium: Hüseyin Avni Aker Stadium; Referee: Mustafa Çulcu

=== 2nd half ===
28 January 2000 18. Week	Trabzonspor	0–1	Adanaspor	Trabzon
20:00		Report	(Turkey) Altan Aksoy 54'	Stadium: Hüseyin Avni Aker Stadium; Referee: Serdar Tatlı

6 February 2000 19. Week	Galatasaray	2–0	Trabzonspor	Istanbul
19:00	(Turkey) Okan Buruk 44' (Turkey) Hakan Şükür 49'	Report		Stadium: Ali Sami Yen Stadium; Referee: Kadir Tozlu

12 February 2000 20. Week	Trabzonspor	2–0	Antalyaspor	Trabzon
19:00	(Turkey) Fatih Tekke 11' (Turkey) Hami Mandıralı 16'	Report		Stadium: Hüseyin Avni Aker Stadium; Referee: Sadık İlhan

20 February 2000 21. Week	Bursaspor	2–3	Trabzonspor	Bursa
13:30	(Turkey) Önder Deniz Kolgu 31' (Turkey) Serkan Damla 79'	Report	(Turkey) Hami Mandıralı 25' (pen.), 28' (Turkey) Osman Özköylü 44'	Stadium: Bursa Atatürk Stadium; Referee: Ali Uluyol

26 February 2000 22. Week	Trabzonspor	2–0	Göztepe	Trabzon
13:30	(Turkey) Hami Mandıralı 16' (Turkey) Orhan Çıkırıkçı 55'	Report		Stadium: Hüseyin Avni Aker Stadium; Referee: Murat Ilgaz

4 March 2000 23. Week	Fenerbahçe	2–1	Trabzonspor	Istanbul
19:00	(Guinea) Souleymane Oularé 5' (Romania) Ioan Viorel Moldovan 81'	Report	(Turkey) Osman Özköylü 71'	Stadium: Şükrü Saracoğlu Stadium; Referee: Metin Tokat

10 March 2000 24. Week	Trabzonspor	2–0	Erzurumspor	Trabzon
20:00	(Turkey) Erman Özgür 30' (Turkey) Tamer Tuna 45'	Report		Stadium: Hüseyin Avni Aker Stadium; Referee: Zafer Önder İpek

19 March 2000 25. Week	Gençlerbirliği	0–1	Trabzonspor	Ankara
13:30		Report	(Turkey) Abdülkadir Demirci 78'	Stadium: Ankara 19 Mayıs Stadium; Referee: Mutlu Çelik

25 March 2000 26. Week	Trabzonspor	1–2	Beşiktaş	Trabzon
19:00	(Turkey) Abdülkadir Demirci 41'	Report	(Turkey) Ahmet Dursun 6' (Turkey) Ertuğrul Sağlam 35'	Stadium: Hüseyin Avni Aker Stadium; Referee: Mustafa Çulcu

31 March 2000 27. Week	Denizlispor	0–2	Trabzonspor	Denizli
20:00		Report	(Turkey) Hami Mandıralı 11' (Turkey) Abdülkadir Demirci 56'	Stadium: Denizli Atatürk Stadium; Referee: Muhittin Boşat

9 April 2000 28. Week	Trabzonspor	4–2	Vanspor	Trabzon
14:30	(Turkey) Fatih Tekke 1' (Turkey) Abdülkadir Demirci 31', 49' (Turkey) Hami Mandıralı 35'	Report	(Turkey) Seyit Cem Ünsal 44', 79'	Stadium: Hüseyin Avni Aker Stadium; Referee: Mustafa Kalkandelen

15 April 2000 29. Week	Kocaelispor	1–0	Trabzonspor	İzmit
19:00	(North Macedonia) İgor Sasa Nikolovski (90 (k.k.))	Report		Stadium: İsmet Paşa Stadium; Referee: Bülent Uzun

22 April 2000 30. Week	Trabzonspor	2–1	Altay	Trabzon
16:30	(Turkey) Serkan Karababa (37 (k.k.)) (Turkey) Osman Özköylü 85'	Report	(Turkey) Özkan Koçtürk 66'	Stadium: Hüseyin Avni Aker Stadium; Referee: Erdal Güleç

29 April 2000 31. Week	İstanbulspor	5–1	Trabzonspor	Istanbul
17:00	(Turkey) Sertan Eser 52' (Turkey) Emre Aşık 54' (Turkey) Aykut Kocaman 78', 86', 89'		(Turkey) Murat Bölükbaş 28'	Stadium: Bayrampaşa Belediye Stadı; Referee: Sadık İlhan

6 May 2000 32. Week	Gaziantepspor	3–0	Trabzonspor	Gaziantep
19:90	(Turkey) Oktay Derelioğlu 45', 58' (Turkey) Erhan Albayrak 76'			Stadium: Gaziantep Kamil Ocak Stadium; Referee: Oğuz Sarvan

13 May 2000 33. Week	Trabzonspor	3–2	Samsunspor	Trabzon
19:00	(Turkey) Tamer Tuna 2' (Croatia) Davor Vugrinec 6' (Turkey) Abdülkadir Demirci 56'	Report	(Turkey) Güngör Öztürk 40' (Turkey) İlhan Mansız 61'	Stadium: Hüseyin Avni Aker Stadium; Referee: Musa Eryılmaz

21 May 2000 34. Week	Ankaragücü	1–1	Trabzonspor	Ankara
19:00	(Ghana) Stephen Baidoo 4'	Report	(Turkey) Hami Mandıralı 87'	Stadium: Ankara 19 Mayıs Stadium; Referee: Bülent Uzun

== Turkish Cup ==
15 December 1999 3rd round	Trabzonspor	3–1	Göztepe	Trabzon
12:00	(Turkey) Hami Mandıralı 56' (pen.), 61', 78' (Note: 6th player who made a hat-trick in Turkish Cup in Trabzonspor history.)	–	(Turkey) Atilla Şahin 74'	Stadium: Hüseyin Avni Aker Stadium; Referee: Ali Uluyol

19 January 2000 4th round	Kocaelispor	0–2	Trabzonspor	İzmit
18:00	–	–	(Croatia) Davor Vugrinec 11' (Turkey) Orhan Çıkırıkçı 60'	Stadium: İsmet Paşa Stadium; Referee: Ünsal Çimen

2 February 2000 Quarter final	Trabzonspor	1–2	Galatasaray	Trabzon
20:00	(Croatia) Davor Vugrinec 14'	–	(Turkey) Sergen Yalçın 66', 71'	Stadium: Hüseyin Avni Aker Stadium; Referee: Oğuz Sarvan

== European Cups ==
Trabzonspor couldn't qualify to play in any European cup games in 1999–2000 season.

== Sources ==
- Turkish Football Federation
- Trabzonspor Official Site
- MAÇKOLİK
