= 2002–03 Trabzonspor season =

Trabzonspor
2002–03 season
- President: Özkan Sümer
- Manager: Samet Aybaba
- Stadium: Hüseyin Avni Aker Stadium
- Turkish Super League: 7th
- Turkish Cup: winner

Trabzonspor didn't have a successful season in 2002–03 coming 7th in the table. In spite of this, Trabzonspor won the Turkish Cup.

== Squad ==
Note: Flags indicate national team as defined under FIFA eligibility rules; some limited exceptions apply. Players may hold more than one non-FIFA nationality.

No.	Pos.	Nation	Player
3	DF	TUR	Serkan Özsoy
4	DF	TUR	Erman Güraçar
5	MF	TUR	Hüseyin Çimşir
6	DF	TUR	Mustafa Güven
7	DF	TUR	Feridun Sungur
8	MF	BEL	Hans Somers
9	FW	TUR	Fatih Tekke
10	MF	TUR	Muzaffer Bilazer
11	MF	TUR	Erman Özgür
13	MF	KOR	Lee Eul-Yong (on loan from Bucheon)
14	FW	ALB	Alban Bushi
15	MF	TUR	Mehmet Aurélio
16	DF	SEN	Oumar Dieng
17	FW	TUR	Mehmet Yılmaz (on loan from Altay)
18	DF	TUR	Tayfun Cora

No.	Pos.	Nation	Player
19	MF	TUR	Hasan Üçüncü
20	DF	TUR	Mehmet Kahriman
21	MF	TUR	Ali Şen Kandil
22	GK	TUR	Metin Aktaş
23	GK	AUS	Michael Petkovic
24	DF	TUR	Erdinç Yavuz
25	MF	TUR	Yavuz Yılmaz
27	FW	TUR	Emre Aygün
29	FW	TUR	Selahattin Kınalı
32	DF	TUR	Mustafa Yalçınkaya
33	GK	TUR	Osman Kurtuldu
38	DF	TUR	Hakkı Daş
61	MF	TUR	Gökdeniz Karadeniz
64	DF	TUR	Serkan Kılıç
83	GK	TUR	Tolga Zengin

== Table ==
Pos	Team	Pld	W	D	L	GF	GA	GD	Pts	Qualification or relegation
5	Malatyaspor	34	14	10	10	56	45	+11	52	Qualification to UEFA Cup first round
6	Fenerbahçe	34	13	12	9	55	42	+13	51 (Note: Fenerbahçe were ahead of Trabzonspor on head-to-head record: Fenerbahçe–Trabzonspor 3–2, Trabzonspor–Fenerbahçe 0–0.)	
7	Trabzonspor	34	13	12	9	44	33	+11	51	Qualification to UEFA Cup first round (Note: Trabzonspor have won the 2002–03 Turkish Cup competition and thus are qualified for the first round of the UEFA Cup.)
8	MKE Ankaragücü	34	15	4	15	44	42	+2	49	
9	İstanbulspor	34	12	7	15	42	48	−6	43	

Rules for classification: 1) points; 2) goal difference; 3) number of goals scored.

== Scorers ==
#	Name	League	Turkish Cup	Total
1	(Turkey) Mehmet Yılmaz	9	8	17
2	(Turkey) Fatih Tekke	13	3	16
3	(Turkey) Gökdeniz Karadeniz	4	3	7
4	(Brazil) (Turkey) Mehmet Aurélio	6	–	6
5	(Turkey) Erman Özgür	2	1	3
6	(Belgium) Hans Somers	1	2	3
7	(Turkey) Hüseyin Çimşir	3	–	3
8	(Turkey) Erdinç Yavuz	2	–	2
9	(Turkey) Erman Özgür	2	–	2
10	(Turkey) Selahattin Kınalı	–	1	1
11	(Turkey) Tayfun Cora	–	1	1

=== Hat-tricks ===
#	Name	Game	Category	Date
1	(Turkey) Mehmet Hilmi Yılmaz (Note: 7th player in Trabzonspor who did a hat-trick in Turkish cup.)	Trabzonspor 7 – 1 Büyükşehir Belediye Ankaraspor	Turkish Cup	5 March 2003

== Fourth round ==
Quarter-finals
Galatasaray	1
Malatyaspor	2
Çaykur Rizespor (pen.)	1
Kocaelispor	1
Trabzonspor	7
Ankaraspor	1
Beşiktaş JK	3
Gençlerbirliği (uz.)	4

Semi-finals
Çaykur Rizespor	1
Gençlerbirliği (uz.)	2
Malatyaspor	0
Trabzonspor	3

Final
Gençlerbirliği	1
Trabzonspor	3

== Semifinal ==
9 April 2003
20:00

Malatyaspor	0 - 3	Trabzonspor
		31' Tayfun Cora; 42' Mehmet Yılmaz; 65' Fatih Tekke

Malatya İnönü Stadium, Malatya
Referee: İsmet Arzuman

== Final ==
23 April 2003
20:30

Gençlerbirliği	1–3	Trabzonspor
44' Ahmed Hassan		9' Mehmet Yılmaz; 31' Gökdeniz Karadeniz; 70' Gökdeniz Karadeniz

Antalya Atatürk Stadyumu, Antalya
Referee: Mustafa Çulcu
