= 2000–01 Trabzonspor season =

Trabzonspor
2000–01 season
- Chairman: (Turkey) Özkan Sümer
- Manager: (Turkey) Giray Bulak
- Stadium: Hüseyin Avni Aker Stadium
- 1. Lig: 5th
- 2000–01 Turkish Cup: Quarter final

2000–01 Trabzonspor season was the 25th consecutive season that the club played in the 1. Lig.

== Season summary ==
Trabzonspor finished 5th the 2000–01 season. Trabzonspor was included the Turkish Cup from 3rd round. Galatasaray defeated Trabzonspor 4 – 1 in Trabzon in quarter finals. Trabzonspor could not qualify to play in any European cup games for the 2000–01 season.

== Squad ==
Note: Flags indicate national team as defined under FIFA eligibility rules; some limited exceptions apply. Players may hold more than one non-FIFA nationality.

No.	Pos.	Nation	Player
2	MF	TUR	Sergen Yalçın (on loan from Siirtspor)
3	DF	MKD	Igor Nikolovski
4	DF	TUR	Güngör Öztürk
5	DF	TUR	Osman Özköylü
6	FW	TUR	Orhan Çıkırıkçı
7	MF	TUR	Zafer Demiray
8	MF	TUR	Abdülkadir Demirci
9	FW	TUR	Murat Bölükbaş
10	FW	TUR	Hami Mandıralı
11	MF	TUR	Erman Özgür
12	GK	MKD	Petar Miloševski
13	DF	TUR	Mustafa Güven
14	DF	AUT	Volkan Kahraman
17	DF	TUR	Erhan Namlı
18	FW	NOR	Rune Lange

No.	Pos.	Nation	Player
19	DF	TUR	Cem Beceren
20	DF	TUR	Gökhan Kolomoç
21	MF	MKD	Žarko Serafimovski
22	GK	TUR	Metin Aktaş
25	MF	TUR	Tamer Tuna
29	FW	TUR	Oktay Derelioğlu
32	DF	TUR	Ramazan Özalp
33	MF	TUR	Nesim Özgür
38	DF	TUR	Kenan Başkan
61	MF	TUR	Gökdeniz Karadeniz
72	FW	GER	Alexander Löbe
77	MF	BUL	Todor Yanchev
-	GK	TUR	Ufuk Ali
-	GK	TUR	Osman Kurtuldu

== Transfers ==
=== In ===
#	Pos.	Player	Transferred from	Transfer type	Fee	Date	Ref.
1	FW	(Germany) Alexander Löbe	Erzurumspor	Transfer	-	20 September 2000	
2	MF	(Turkey) Ali Rıza Sergen Yalçın	Siirt Jet-PA Spor	Loan	-	9 August 2000	
3	-	(Turkey) Erhan Namlı	Gaziantepspor	Transfer	-	2 June 2000	
4	-	(Turkey) Nuri Yılmaz	Trabzonspor (youth team)	Professional debut	-	31 July 2000	
5	FW	(Turkey) Oktay Derelioğlu	Siirt Jet-PA Spor	-	-	-	
6	-	(Norway) Rune Lange	Tromsø IL	Transfer	-	1 July 2000	
7	-	(Bulgaria) Todor Dimitrov Yanchev	PFC CSKA Sofia	Transfer	-	-	
8	-	(Turkey) Zafer Demiray	Antalyaspor	Transfer	-	2 June 2000	
9	-	(North Macedonia) Zarko Serafimovski	FK Makedonija Gjorče Petrov	Transfer	-	-	

=== Out ===
#	Pos.	Player	Transferred to	Transferred type	Fee	Date	Ref.
1	FW	(Turkey) Bülent Uygun	Zonguldakspor	Transfer	-	28 August 2000	
2	FW	(Croatia) Davor Vugrinec	US Lecce	Transfer	-	-	
3	-	(Ghana) Emmanuel Tetteh	Çaykur Rizespor	Transfer	-	7 August 2000	
4	-	(Turkey) Erol Bulut	Eintracht Frankfurt	Was on loan. Returned.	-	-	
5	FW	(Turkey) Fatih Tekke	Gaziantepspor	Transfer	-	1 July 2000	
6	FW	(Turkey) Hüseyin Çimşir	Antalyaspor	Transfer	-	28 June 2000	
7	-	(Turkey) Murat Deniz	Sakaryaspor	Transfer	-	18 July 2000	
8	-	(Turkey) Nuri Yılmaz	Arsinspor	Loan	-	3 November 2000	
9	-	(Brazil) Rogério Oliveira da Costa	Vanspor	-	-	-	
10	-	(Turkey) Selahattin Kınalı	Antalyaspor	Transfer	-	28 July 2000	
11	FW	(Turkey) Selim Özer	Yimpaş Yozgatspor	Transfer	-	19 July 2000	

== League table ==
Pos	Team	Pld	W	D	L	GF	GA	GD	Pts	Qualification or relegation
3	Gaziantepspor	34	20	8	6	67	40	+27	68	Qualification to UEFA Cup qualifying round
4	Beşiktaş	34	19	7	8	68	48	+20	64	
5	Trabzonspor	34	17	7	10	69	52	+17	58	
6	MKE Ankaragücü	34	16	8	10	65	59	+6	56	
7	Yimpaş Yozgatspor	34	13	10	11	55	46	+9	49	

Rules for classification: 1) points; 2) goal difference; 3) number of goals scored.

== Scorers ==
#	Player	1. Lig	Turkish Cup	Total
1	(Turkey) Hami Mandıralı	18	1	19
2	(Turkey) Oktay Derelioğlu	14	–	14
3	(Norway) Rune Lange	5	1	6
4	(Turkey) Abdülkadir Demirci	3	2	5
4	(Turkey) Gökdeniz Karadeniz	5	–	5
4	(Turkey) Tamer Tuna	5	–	5
7	(Turkey) Erhan Namlı	3	1	4
7	(Turkey) Zafer Demiray	4	–	4
9	(Germany) Alexander Löbe	3	–	3
10	(Turkey) Erman Özgür	2	–	2
10	(Turkey) Orhan Çıkırıkçı	2	–	2
10	(North Macedonia) Zarko Serafimovski	2	–	2
13	(Turkey) Ali Rıza Sergen Yalçın	1	–	1
13	(Turkey) Murat Bölükbaş	1	–	1

=== Hat-tricks ===
#	Player	Game	Category	Date
1	(Turkey) Oktay Derelioğlu	Antalyaspor 2 – 3 Trabzonspor	1. Lig	7 April 2001
2	(Turkey) Hami Mandıralı	Adanaspor 1 – 7 Trabzonspor (Note: For the first time in Trabzonspor history two players achieved a hat-trick in the same game.)	1. Lig	21 April 2001
3	(Turkey) Oktay Derelioğlu	Adanaspor 1 – 7 Trabzonspor	1. Lig	21 April 2001

== 1. lig games ==
=== 1st half ===
12 August 2000 1. Week	Erzurumspor	1–3	Trabzonspor	Erzurum
19:00	(Germany) Alexander Löbe 86'	Report	(Turkey) Hami Mandıralı 51' (Turkey) Tamer Tuna 88' (Turkey) Erhan Namlı 90'	Stadium: Cemal Gürsel Stadium; Referee: Bülent Uzun

20 August 2000 2. Week	Trabzonspor	2–1	Bursaspor	Trabzon
17:00	(Norway) Rune Lange 30' (North Macedonia) Zarko Serafimovski 50'	Report	(Romania) Ioan Lupescu 89'	Stadium: Hüseyin Avni Aker Stadium; Referee: Serdar Tatlı

25 August 2000 3. Week	Samsunspor	1–1	Trabzonspor	Samsun
20:00	(Turkey) Ertuğrul Sağlam 13'	Report	(Turkey) Tamer Tuna 15'	Stadium: Samsun 19 Mayıs Stadium; Referee: Oğuz Sarvan

9 September 2000 4. Week	Trabzonspor	2–1	Kocaelispor	Trabzon
19:00	(Turkey) Hami Mandıralı 23', 86'		(Turkey) Ahmet Arslaner 62'	Stadium: Hüseyin Avni Aker Stadium; Referee: Cem Tosyalı

17 September 2000 5. Week	İstanbulspor	1–0	Trabzonspor	Istanbul
19:00	(Turkey) Bülent Üçüncü 16'	Report	–	Stadium: Şükrü Saracoğlu Stadium; Referee: Mustafa Çulcu

24 September 2000 6. Week	Trabzonspor	2–0	Gençlerbirliği	Trabzon
19:00	(Turkey) Ali Rıza Sergen Yalçın 48' (Turkey) Hami Mandıralı 71' (pen.)	Report	–	Stadium: Hüseyin Avni Aker Stadium; Referee: Erol Ersoy

1 October 2000 7. Week	Siirt Jet-PA Spor	1–4	Trabzonspor	Siirt
14:00	(Mali) Fernand Coulibaly 27'	Report	(Germany) Alexander Löbe 11', 26' (Turkey) Zafer Demiray 71' (Turkey) Orhan Çıkırıkçı 88'	Stadium: Siirt Atatürk Stadium; Referee: Orhan Erdemir

14 October 2000 8. Week	Trabzonspor	2–0	Beşiktaş	Trabzon
19:00	(Germany) Alexander Löbe 1' (Turkey) Hami Mandıralı 38'		–	Stadium: Hüseyin Avni Aker Stadium; Referee: Metin Tokat

21 October 2000 9. Week	Yimpaş Yozgatspor	1–1	Trabzonspor	Yozgat
15:00	(Turkey) Mutlu Dervişoğlu 79'	Report	(Turkey) Hami Mandıralı 12' (pen.)	Stadium: Yozgatspor Stadium; Referee: Mutlu Çelik

28 October 2000 10. Week	Trabzonspor	4–0	Antalyaspor	Trabzon
13:00	(Turkey) Erhan Namlı 2' (Germany) Alexander Löbe 60' (Turkey) Hami Mandıralı 81' (Turkey) Tamer Tuna 90'		–	Stadium: Hüseyin Avni Aker Stadium; Referee: Murat Ilgaz

3 November 2000 11. Week	Çaykur Rizespor	2–1	Trabzonspor	Rize
20:00	(Ghana) Emmanuel Tetteh 48' (Turkey) Mutlu Sezer 88'	Report	(Turkey) Erman Özgür 81'	Stadium: Rize Atatürk Stadium; Referee: Erol Ersoy

12 November 2000 12. Week	Trabzonspor	3–3	Adanaspor	Trabzon
13:30	(Turkey) Zafer Demiray 68', 78' (Turkey) Gökdeniz Karadeniz 76' (pen.)	Report	(Turkey) Evren Nuri Turhan 44' (Turkey) Cenk İşler 58' (Turkey) Altan Aksoy 61'	Stadium: Hüseyin Avni Aker Stadium; Referee: Selçuk Dereli

19 November 2000 13. Week	Fenerbahçe	5–2	Trabzonspor	Istanbul
19:00	(Sweden) Kennet Andersson 6', 18' (Bosnia and Herzegovina) (Turkey) Elvir Baljić 37', 71' (Serbia) Nikola Lazetić 78' (pen.)	Report	(Norway) Rune Lange 60', 84'	Stadium: Şükrü Saracoğlu Stadium; Referee: Mustafa Çulcu

24 November 2000 14. Week	Trabzonspor	2–2	Ankaragücü	Trabzon
20:00	(Norway) Rune Lange 26' (Turkey) Abdülkadir Demirci 42'	Report	(Ghana) Ohene Kennedy 55' (South Africa) Dumisa Ngobe 65'	Stadium: Hüseyin Avni Aker Stadium; Referee: Orhan Erdemir

2 December 2000 15. Week	Trabzonspor	3–1	Gaziantepspor	Trabzon
13:00	(Turkey) Hami Mandıralı 23' (Norway) Rune Lange 44' (Turkey) Murat Bölükbaş 85'	Report	(Turkey) Hasan Özer 90'	Stadium: Hüseyin Avni Aker Stadium; Referee: Metin Tokat

8 December 2000 16. Week	Denizlispor	2–0	Trabzonspor	Denizli
20:00	(Mali) Fernand Coulibaly 69', 79'	Report	–	Stadium: Denizli Atatürk Stadium; Referee: Sebahattin Bitirim

17 December 2000 17. Week	Trabzonspor	1–1	Galatasaray	Trabzon
19:00	(North Macedonia) Zarko Serafimovski 90'	Report	(Brazil) Carlos Alberto de Oliveira Capone 8'	Stadium: Hüseyin Avni Aker Stadium; Referee: Metin Tokat

=== 2nd half ===
21 December 2000 18. Week	Trabzonspor	3–0	Erzurumspor	Trabzon
20:00	(Turkey) Zafer Demiray 21' (Turkey) Abdülkadir Demirci 68' (Turkey) Orhan Çıkırıkçı 84' (Note: Last goal of Orhan Çıkırıkçı with Trabzonspor jersey)	Report	–	Stadium: Hüseyin Avni Aker Stadium; Referee: Ali Uluyol

4 February 2001 19. Week	Bursaspor	4–2	Trabzonspor	Bursa
13:30	(Turkey) Murat Sözkesen 14', 40' (South Africa) John Leshiba Moshoeu 25' (Turkey) Fatih Şen 87'	Report	(Turkey) Gökdeniz Karadeniz 17' (Turkey) Oktay Derelioğlu 24'	Stadium: Bursa Atatürk Stadium; Referee: Murat Ilgaz

9 February 2001 20. Week	Trabzonspor	3–2	Samsunspor	Trabzon
20:00	(Turkey) Oktay Derelioğlu 31', 42' (Turkey) Hami Mandıralı 50' (pen.)		(Turkey) Ertuğrul Sağlam 62' (Turkey) Müslim Can 80'	Stadium: Hüseyin Avni Aker Stadium; Referee: Orhan Erdemir

18 February 2001 21. Week	Kocaelispor	3–2	Trabzonspor	İzmit
13:30	(Slovakia) Milan Timko 15' (Poland) (Turkey) Roman Dąbrowski 43'; Serdar Topraktepe 44'	Report	(Turkey) Oktay Derelioğlu 13' (Turkey) Hami Mandıralı 74' (pen.)	Stadium: İsmet Paşa Stadium; Referee: İsmet Arzuman

25 February 2001 22. Week	Trabzonspor	1–2	İstanbulspor	Trabzon
13:30	(Turkey) Tamer Tuna 87'	Report	(Turkey) Mithat Yavaş 12' (Turkey) Sertan Eser 58'	Stadium: Hüseyin Avni Aker Stadium; Referee: Bülent Uzun

2 March 2001 23. Week	Gençlerbirliği	0–2	Trabzonspor	Ankara
13:30	–	Report	(Turkey) Gökdeniz Karadeniz 60', 75'	Stadium: Ankara 19 Mayıs Stadium; Referee: Cem Tosyalı

11 March 2001 24. Week	Trabzonspor	2–4	Siirt Jet-PA Spor	Trabzon
14:00	(Turkey) Hami Mandıralı 61' (Turkey) Abdülkadir Demirci 71'	Report	(Germany) Stephan Hanke 3' (Turkey) Ersen Martin 29', 36' (Turkey) Atilla Güneş 89'	Stadium: Hüseyin Avni Aker Stadium; Referee: Harun Yiğit

18 March 2001 25. Week	Beşiktaş	3–1	Trabzonspor	Istanbul
19:00	(Slovakia) Miroslav Karhan 18' (Turkey) Bayram Kadir Bektaş 53' (Turkey) İbrahim Üzülmez 89'	Report	(Turkey) Hami Mandıralı 58' (pen.)	Stadium: BJK İnönü Stadium; Referee: Serdar Tatlı

1 April 2001 26. Week	Trabzonspor	1–1	Yimpaş Yozgatspor	Trabzon
15:00	(Turkey) Oktay Derelioğlu 23'		(Ghana) Yaw Preko 90'	Stadium: Hüseyin Avni Aker Stadium; Referee: Ali Uluyol

7 April 2001 27. Week	Antalyaspor	2–3	Trabzonspor	Antalya
15:00	(Turkey) Uğur Yasan 11' (Turkey) Atilla Birlik 41'	Report	(Turkey) Oktay Derelioğlu 44', 51', 63'	Stadium: Antalya Atatürk Stadium; Referee: Kadir Tozlu

15 April 2001 28. Week	Trabzonspor	2–0	Çaykur Rizespor	Trabzon
15:00	(Turkey) Hami Mandıralı 83' (Turkey) Oktay Derelioğlu 89'	Report	–	Stadium: Hüseyin Avni Aker Stadium; Referee: Erol Ersoy

21 April 2001 29. Week	Adanaspor	1–7	Trabzonspor	Adana
15:00	Cenk İşler 13'	Report	(Turkey) Hami Mandıralı 7', 44', 82' (Turkey) Oktay Derelioğlu 17', 57', 82' (Turkey) Erman Özgür 76'	Stadium: Adana 5 Ocak Stadium; Referee: Orhan Erdemir

29 April 2001 30. Week	Trabzonspor	1–0	Fenerbahçe	Trabzon
19:00	(Turkey) Hami Mandıralı 30'		–	Stadium: Hüseyin Avni Aker Stadium; Referee: Metin Tokat

4 May 2001 31. Week	Ankaragücü	2–4	Trabzonspor	Ankara
20:00	(Turkey) Yılmaz Özlem 55' (Turkey) Cafer Aydın 81'	Report	(Turkey) Gökdeniz Karadeniz 18' (Turkey) Tamer Tuna 27' (Turkey) Hami Mandıralı 37' (Turkey) Erhan Namlı 77'	Stadium: Ankara 19 Mayıs Stadium; Referee: Musa Eryılmaz

13 May 2001 32. Week	Gaziantepspor	1–1	Trabzonspor	Gaziantep
19:00	(Turkey) Hasan Özer 12'		(Turkey) Oktay Derelioğlu 21'	Stadium: Gaziantep Kamil Ocak Stadium; Referee: Orhan Erdemir

20 May 2001 33. Week	Trabzonspor	1–0	Denizlispor	Trabzon
19:00	(Turkey) Oktay Derelioğlu 3'		–	Stadium: Hüseyin Avni Aker Stadium; Referee: Muhittin Boşat

26 May 2001 34. Week	Galatasaray	4–0	Trabzonspor	Istanbul
19:04	(Romania) Gheorghe Hagi 35', 44' (Turkey) Hasan Şaş 40' (Turkey) Serkan Aykut 48'		–	Stadium: Ali Sami Yen Stadium; Referee: Ali Aydın

== Turkish Cup ==
28 November 2000 3rd round	Altay	1–2	Trabzonspor	İzmir
18:00	(Turkey) Yakup Sertkaya 56'	–	(Turkey) Abdülkadir Demirci 45', 84'	Stadium: Altay Alsancak Stadium; Referee: Metin Seval

13 December 2000 4th round	Gaziantepspor	1–3	Trabzonspor	Gaziantep
18:00	(Brazil) (Turkey) Joao Batista 36'	–	(Norway) Rune Lange 32', 63' (Turkey) Erhan Namlı 51'	Stadium: Gaziantep Kamil Ocak Stadium; Referee: Murat Ilgaz

30 January 2001 Quarter final	Trabzonspor	1–4	Galatasaray	Trabzon
19:00	(Turkey) Hami Mandıralı 7'	–	(Turkey) Emre Belözoğlu 6', 67' (North Macedonia) Igor Nikolovski (41 (k.k.)) (Turkey) Ümit Davala 84'	Stadium: Hüseyin Avni Aker Stadium; Referee: İhsan Türe

== European cup games ==
Trabzonspor couldn't qualify to play in any European cup games in 2000–01 season.

== Sources ==
- Turkish Football Federation
- Trabzonspor Official Site
- MAÇKOLİK
