= 1998–99 Trabzonspor season =

Trabzonspor
1998–99 season
- Chairman: Mazhar Afacan
- Manager: Gordon Milne
- Stadium: Hüseyin Avni Aker Stadium
- 1. Lig: 4th
- Turkish Cup: Sixth round
- UEFA Cup: First round

The 1998–99 Trabzonspor season was the 24th consecutive season that the club played in the 1. Lig.

== Season summary ==
Trabzonspor finished 4th the 1998–99 season. Trabzonspor was included in the Turkish Cup from 6th round. Trabzonspor played against Gaziantepspor in the 6th round. Trabzonspor won the 1st game 5 - 4 against Gaziantepspor but lost 2nd game 3 - 1 and eliminated from the Turkish Cup. Trabzonspor participated UEFA Cup in the 1998–99 season. In the 1st game of the 1st leg Trabzonspor lost 5 - 1 against Wisła Kraków in Kraków. Trabzonspor also lost the 2nd leg 2 - 1 in Trabzon and eliminated from UEFA Cup

== Squad ==
Note: Flags indicate national team as defined under FIFA eligibility rules; some limited exceptions apply. Players may hold more than one non-FIFA nationality.

No.	Pos.	Nation	Player
—	DF	TUR	Abdullah Ercan
—		TUR	Ahmet Yılmazer
—		TUR	Birol Güneş
—		TUR	Çetin Güner
—	FW	CRO	Davor Vugrinec
—		TUR	Dilaver Satılmış
—		TUR	Erdal Eraşkın
—	FW	TUR	Fatih Tekke
—		TUR	Feti Okuroğlu
—		TUR	Gökdeniz Karadeniz
—		TUR	Gökhan Kolomoç
—		TUR	Hasan Üçüncü
—		CZE	Karel Rada
—	FW	ENG	Kevin Campbell
—		TUR	Mehmet İpek
—		TUR	Mehmet Zengin
—	GK	TUR	Metin Aktaş

No.	Pos.	Nation	Player
—		TUR	Murat Deniz
—		TUR	Mustafa Macit Güven
—	MF	TUR	Ogün Temizkanoğlu
—		TUR	Okan Çebi
—		TUR	Okan Özke
—	FW	TUR	Orhan Çıkırıkçı
—		TUR	Osman Kurtuldu
—	DF	TUR	Osman Özköylü
—	GK	MKD	Petar Miloševski
—	DF	TUR	Recep Çetin
—	FW	TUR	Selahattin Kınalı
—		TUR	Selim Özer
—		TUR	Seyit Cem Ünsal
—		TUR	Tansel Başer
—	MF	TUR	Ünal Karaman
—		UKR	Yuriy Kalitvintsev

== Transfers ==
=== In ===
#	Pos.	Player	Transferred from	Transfer type	Fee	Date	Ref.
1	-	(Turkey) Erdal Eraşkın	-	-	-	-	
2	FW	(Turkey) Fatih Tekke	Altay	Transfer	-	1 July 1998	
3	-	(Turkey) Feti Okuroğlu	Galatasaray	Transfer	-	1 July 1998	
4	-	(Turkey) Gökdeniz Karadeniz	Trabzonspor (youth team)	Professional debut	-	8 October 1998	
5	FW	(England) Kevin Campbell	Nottingham Forest FC	Transfer	-	30 July 1998	
6	-	(Turkey) Mehmet Zengin	Zonguldakspor	Transfer	-	1 July 1998	
7	-	(Turkey) Murat Deniz	Altay	Transfer	-	19 August 1998	
8	-	(Turkey) Mustafa Macit Güven	Akçaabat Sebatspor (youth team)	Transfer	-	7 August 1998	
9	-	(Turkey) Okan Çebi	Trabzonspor (youth team)	Transfer	-	17 June 1998	
10	-	(Turkey) Osman Kurtuldu	Trabzonspor (youth team)	Transfer	-	-	
11	GK	(North Macedonia) Petar Miloševski	FK Vardar	Transfer	-	17 July 1998	
12	DF	(Turkey) Recep Çetin	Beşiktaş	Transfer	-	17 July 1998	
13	-	(Turkey) Selim Özer	Bursaspor	Transfer	-	-	
14	-	(Turkey) Seyit Cem Ünsal	FC Barcelona	Transfer	-	21 August 1998	
15	-	(Turkey) Tansel Başer	South Melbourne FC	Transfer	-	-	
16	-	(Ukraine) Yuriy Kalitvintsev	FC Dynamo Kyiv	Transfer	-	18 November 1998	

=== Out ===
#	Pos.	Player	Transferred to	Transfer type	Fee	Date	Ref.
1	-	(Turkey) Erdal Eraslan	Borussia Dortmund II	Transfer	-	8 March 1999	
2	-	(Georgia (country)) Gocha Jamarauli	FC Zürich	Transfer	-	31 May 1998	
3	MF	(Turkey) Tolunay Kafkas	Galatasaray	Transfer	-	23 July 1998	
4	FW	(Turkey) Hami Mandıralı	FC Schalke 04	Transfer	-	-	
5	-	(Turkey) Hüseyin Çimşir	Sakaryaspor	Loan	-	11 September 1998	
6	-	(Turkey) İskender Eroğlu	Konyaspor	Transfer	-	11 September 1998	
7	-	(Cameroon) Jean-Jacques Missé-Missé	Dundee United FC	Transfer	-	-	
8	-	(Turkey) Kazım Nas	Çaykur Rizespor	Transfer	-	3 August 1998	
9	FW	(England) Kevin Campbell	Everton FC	Loan	-	-	
10	GK	(Turkey) Nihat Tümkaya	Altay	Transfer	-	20 August 1998	
11	-	(Turkey) Ragıp Başdağ	Orduspor	Loan	-	17 Eylül 1998	

== League table ==
Pos	Team	Pld	W	D	L	GF	GA	GD	Pts	Qualification or relegation
2	Beşiktaş	34	23	8	3	58	27	+31	77	Qualification to Champions League second qualifying round
3	Fenerbahçe	34	22	6	6	84	29	+55	72	Qualification to UEFA Cup first round
4	Trabzonspor	34	17	7	10	48	37	+11	58	Qualification to Intertoto Cup third round
5	Kocaelispor	34	14	8	12	44	37	+7	50	Qualification to Intertoto Cup second round
6	Antalyaspor	34	14	7	13	46	47	−1	49	

Rules for classification: 1) points; 2) goal difference; 3) number of goals scored.

== Scorers ==
#	Name	1. lig	Turkish Cup	UEFA Cup	Total
1	(Croatia) Davor Vugrinec	12	3	1	16
2	(Turkey) Mehmet Zengin	5	2	-	7
3	(England) Kevin Campbell	5	1	-	6
4	(Turkey) Ogün Temizkanoğlu	5	-	-	5
5	(Turkey) Fatih Tekke	4	-	-	4
5	(Turkey) Selahattin Kınalı	4	-	-	4
7	(Turkey) Çetin Güner	2	-	-	2
7	(Turkey) Ünal Karaman	2	-	-	2
9	(Turkey) Abdullah Ercan	1	-	-	1
9	(Turkey) Feti Okuroğlu	1	-	-	1
9	(Turkey) Mehmet İpek	1	-	-	1
9	(Turkey) Orhan Çıkırıkçı	1	-	-	1
9	(Turkey) Osman Özköylü	1	-	-	1
9	(Turkey) Selim Özer	1	-	-	1
9	(Ukraine) Yuriy Kalintvintsev	1	-	-	1
9	(Turkey) Hüseyin Çimşir	-	-	1	1

=== Hat-tricks ===
#	Player	Game	Category	Date
1	(England) Kevin Campbell	Galatasaray 3 - 5 Trabzonspor	1. Lig	15 November 1998
2	(Croatia) Davor Vugrinec	Trabzonspor 5 - 4 Gaziantepspor	Turkish Cup	18 November 1998
3	(Croatia) Davor Vugrinec	Trabzonspor 3 - 1 Erzurumspor	1. Lig	5 March 1999

== 1. Lig games ==
=== 1st half ===
8 August 1998 1. week	Trabzonspor	0 - 1	Gaziantepspor	Trabzon
20:00	-	Report	(Mali) Fernand Coulibaly 43'	Stadium: Hüseyin Avni Aker Stadium; Referee: Metin Tokat

16 August 1998 2. week	Altay	2 - 5	Trabzonspor	İzmir
20:00	(Turkey) Murat Alaçayır 28' (Central African Republic) Ibrahim Bohari 36'	Report	(Croatia) Davor Vugrinec 5' (Turkey) Mehmet Zengin 47' (Turkey) Çetin Güner 81', 89' (Turkey) Ogün Temizkanoğlu 83'	Stadium: Altay Alsancak Stadium; Referee: Muhittin Boşat

22 August 1998 3. week	Trabzonspor	2 - 0	Bursaspor	Trabzon
20:00	(Turkey) Mehmet Zengin 3' (Turkey) Ogün Temizkanoğlu 17'	Report	-	Stadium: Hüseyin Avni Aker Stadium; Referee: Ayhan Yücebilgiç

30 August 1998 4. week	Kocaelispor	1 - 1	Trabzonspor	İzmit
20:00	(Turkey) Orhan Kaynak 22'	Report	(Croatia) Davor Vugrinec 55'	Stadium: İsmet Paşa Stadium; Referee: Oğuz Sarvan

11 September 1998 5. week	Trabzonspor	0 - 0	İstanbulspor	Trabzon
20:00	-	Report	-	Stadium: Hüseyin Avni Aker Stadium; Referee: Serdar Tatlı

20 September 1998 6. week	Erzurumspor	2 - 2	Trabzonspor	Erzurum
15:30	(Turkey) Coşkun Birdal 7' (Morocco) Muhammed el-Bedravi 38'	Report	(Turkey) Feti Okuroğlu 43' (Turkey) Ogün Temizkanoğlu 50'	Stadium: Cemal Gürsel Stadium; Referee: Yılnur Önen

25 September 1998 7. week	Trabzonspor	1 - 0	Fenerbahçe	Trabzon
20:00	(England) Kevin Campbell 2'	Report	-	Stadium: Hüseyin Avni Aker Stadium; Referee: İbrahim Aksoy

17 October 1998 8. week	Gençlerbirliği	0 - 1	Trabzonspor	Ankara
19:00	-	Report	(Croatia) Davor Vugrinec 48'	Stadium: Ankara 19 Mayıs Stadyumu; Referee: Muhittin Boşat

23 October 1998 9. week	Trabzonspor	2 - 0	Adanaspor	Trabzon
20:00	(Croatia) Davor Vugrinec 70' (England) Kevin Campbell 89'	Report	-	Stadium: Hüseyin Avni Aker Stadium; Referee: Serdar Çakır

30 October 1998 10. week	Samsunspor	2 - 1	Trabzonspor	Samsun
20:00	(Turkey) Cenk İşler 7', 25'	Report	(Turkey) Selahattin Kınalı 56'	Stadium: Samsun 19 Mayıs Stadium; Referee: İlhami Kaplan

7 November 1998 11. week	Trabzonspor	1 - 0	Karabükspor	Trabzon
20:00	(Turkey) Mehmet Zengin 64'	Report	-	Stadium: Hüseyin Avni Aker Stadium; Referee: Orhan Erdemir

15 November 1998 12. week	Galatasaray	3 - 5	Trabzonspor	Istanbul
19:00	(Turkey) Ogün Temizkanoğlu (14 (k.k.)) (Turkey) Bülent Korkmaz 78' (Turkey) Burak Akdiş 88'	Report	(England) Kevin Campbell 6', 31', 89' (Turkey) Selahattin Kınalı 65' (Turkey) Orhan Çıkırıkçı 86'	Stadium: Ali Sami Yen Stadium; Referee: Serdar Tatlı

21 November 1998 13. week	Çanakkale Dardanelspor	2 - 3	Trabzonspor	Çanakkale
19:00	(Uganda) Majid Musisi 30', 42'	Report	(Turkey) Mehmet Zengin 17' (Croatia) Davor Vugrinec 36' (pen.), 75'	Stadium: Çanakkale 18 Mart Stadium; Referee: Oğuz Sarvan

28 November 1998 14. week	Trabzonspor	2 - 1	Sakaryaspor	Trabzon
19:00	(Turkey) Mehmet İpek 22' (Turkey) Timuçin Bayazıt (62 (k.k.))	Report	(Turkey) Sefer Yılmaz 21'	Stadium: Hüseyin Avni Aker Stadium; Referee: Metin Tokat

6 November 1998 15. week	Beşiktaş	2 - 0	Trabzonspor	Istanbul
19:00	(Turkey) Ayhan Akman 66' (Turkey) Oktay Derelioğlu 89' (pen.)	Report	-	Stadium: BJK İnönü Stadium; Referee: Erol Ersoy

13 December 1998 16. week	Trabzonspor	1 - 0	Ankaragücü	Trabzon
19:00	(Croatia) Davor Vugrinec 47'	Report	-	Stadium: Hüseyin Avni Aker Stadium; Referee: Şahin Taşkınsoy

19 December 1998 17. week	Antalyaspor	0 - 1	Trabzonspor	Antalya
19:00	-	Report	(Turkey) Burhan Saatçioğlu (2 (k.k.))	Stadium: Antalya Atatürk Stadium; Referee: Oğuz Sarvan

=== 2nd half ===
31 January 1999 18. week	Gaziantepspor	1 - 1	Trabzonspor	Gaziantep
13:30	(Turkey) Erhan Albayrak 14'	Report	(Turkey) Fatih Tekke 5'	Stadium: Gaziantep Kamil Ocak Stadium; Referee: Ünsal Çimen

7 February 1999 19. week	Trabzonspor	0 - 3	Altay	Trabzon
13:30	-	Report	(Turkey) Hasan Özer 6', 44' (Turkey) Bayram Bektaş 88'	Stadium: Hüseyin Avni Aker Stadium; Referee: Murat Ilgaz

14 February 1999 20. week	Bursaspor	0 - 1	Trabzonspor	Bursa
17:00	-	Report	(Turkey) Ünal Karaman 88'	Stadium: Bursa Atatürk Stadium; Referee: Orhan Erdemir

21 February 1999 21. week	Trabzonspor	0 - 3	Kocaelispor	Trabzon
13:30	-	Report	(Poland) (Turkey) Roman Dąbrowski 2' (Turkey) Orhan Kaynak 64' (Turkey) Mert Korkmaz 73'	Stadium: Hüseyin Avni Aker Stadium; Referee: İbrahim Aksoy

27 February 1999 22. week	İstanbulspor	0 - 0	Trabzonspor	Istanbul
13:30	-	Report	-	Stadium: Bayrampaşa Belediye Stadı; Referee: Metin Tokat

5 March 1999 23. week	Trabzonspor	3 - 1	Erzurumspor	Trabzon
20:00	(Croatia) Davor Vugrinec 8' (pen.), 26', 77'	Report	(Turkey) Coşkun Birdal 63' (pen.)	Stadium: Hüseyin Avni Aker Stadium; Referee: Ayhan Yücebilgiç

13 March 1999 24. week	Fenerbahçe	1 - 0	Trabzonspor	Istanbul
19:00	(Bosnia and Herzegovina) (Turkey) Elvir Baljić 16'	Report	-	Stadium: Şükrü Saracoğlu Stadium; Referee: Oğuz Sarvan

20 March 1999 25. week	Trabzonspor	4 - 0	Gençlerbirliği	Trabzon
19:00	(Turkey) Ogün Temizkanoğlu 49' (pen.), 84' (Note: Last goal scored by Ogün Temizkanoğlu with Trabzonspor jersey.) (Turkey) Mehmet Zengin 51' (Croatia) Davor Vugrinec 81'	Report	-	Stadium: Hüseyin Avni Aker Stadium; Referee: Mustafa Çulcu

2 April 1999 26. week	Adanaspor	0 - 2	Trabzonspor	Adana
20:00	-	Report	(Turkey) Fatih Tekke 57', 64'	Stadium: Adana 5 Ocak Stadium; Referee: Sadık İlhan

11 April 1999 27. week	Trabzonspor	3 - 1	Samsunspor	Trabzon
13:00	(Turkey) Ünal Karaman 4' (Note: Last goal scored by Ünal Karaman with Trabzonspor jersey.) (Turkey) Selahattin Kınalı 32' (Croatia) Davor Vugrinec 89'	Report	(Turkey) Serkan Aykut 8'	Stadium: Hüseyin Avni Aker Stadium; Referee: Murat Ilgaz

15 April 1999 28. week	Kardemir Karabükspor	0 - 0	Trabzonspor	Karabük
20:00	-	Report	-	Stadium: Dr. Necmettin Şeyhoğlu Stadium; Referee: Cem Tosyalı

25 April 1999 29. week	Trabzonspor	0 - 3	Galatasaray	Trabzon
19:00	-	Report	(Turkey) Okan Buruk 36' (Turkey) Arif Erdem 52' (Turkey) Hakan Şükür 71' (pen.)	Stadium: Hüseyin Avni Aker Stadium; Referee: Bülent Uzun

2 May 1999 30. week	Trabzonspor	2 - 1	Çanakkale Dardanelspor	Trabzon
16:30	(Ukraine) Yuriy Kalintvintsev 20' (Turkey) Selahattin Kınalı 35'	Report	(Turkey) Ufuk Ateş 88'	Stadium: Hüseyin Avni Aker Stadium; Referee: Kadir Tozlu

9 May 1999 31. week	Sakaryaspor	1 - 1	Trabzonspor	Sakarya
17:00	(Turkey) Aygün Taşkıran 54'	Report	(Turkey) Abdullah Ercan 20' (Note: Last goal scored by Abdullah Ercan with Trabzonspor jersey.)	Stadium: Sakarya Atatürk Stadium; Referee: Muhittin Boşat

16 May 1999 32. week	Trabzonspor	1 - 2 (Note: This game was played in İzmir due to Trabzonspor's two game site closure because of the adverse events happened during the game against Galatasaray played on 25 April 1999.)	Beşiktaş	İzmir
19:00	(Turkey) Fatih Tekke 40'	Report	(Nigeria) Christopher Nusa Ohenhen 30', 55'	Stadium: İzmir Atatürk Stadium; Referee: İbrahim Aksoy

23 May 1999 33. week	Ankaragücü	1 - 0	Trabzonspor	Ankara
17:00	(Turkey) Hakan Keleş 5'	Report	-	Stadium: Ankara 19 Mayıs Stadium; Referee: Bülent Uzun

30 May 1999 34. week	Trabzonspor	2 - 3 (Note: This game was played in Ankara due to Trabzonspor's two game site closure because of the adverse events happened during the game against Galatasaray played on 25 April 1999.)	Antalyaspor	Ankara
17:00	(Turkey) Osman Özköylü 13' (Turkey) Selim Özer 90'	Report	(Turkey) Fazlı Ulusal 55', 89' (Turkey) Kamil Çakır 83'	Stadium: Ankara 19 Mayıs Stadium; Referee: Necdet Erdilek

== Turkish Cup ==
18 November 1998 6th round 1st leg	Trabzonspor	5 - 4 (Note: The only game in Turkish Cup history where a player achieved a hat-trick in both teams.)	Gaziantepspor	Trabzon
19:00	(Croatia) Davor Vugrinec 18', 34' (pen.), 45' (pen.) (Note: 5th player in Trabzonspor history who achieved a hat-trick in Turkish Cup) (Turkey) Mehmet Zengin 71' (England) Kevin Campbell 89'	Report	(Ghana) Yaw Preko 16', 64' (pen.), 69' (Ghana) Samuel Johnson 25'	Stadium: Hüseyin Avni Aker Stadium; Referee: Ali Uluyol

2 December 1998 6th round 2nd leg	Gaziantepspor	3 - 1	Trabzonspor	Gaziantep
17:00	(Ghana) Yaw Preko 7' (pen.) (Turkey) Erhan Namlı 17' (Turkey) İlyas Kahraman 72'	Report	(Turkey) Mehmet Zengin 39'	Stadium: Gaziantep Kamil Ocak Stadium; Referee: Bülent Uzun

== UEFA Cup ==
11 August 1998 UEFA Cup; 1st round 1st leg	Wisła Kraków (Poland)	5 - 1	(Turkey) Trabzonspor	Kraków
17:00	(Poland) Daniel Dubicki 3' (Poland) Tomasz Kulawik 33', 71', 80' (Poland) Bogdan Zajac 89'	Report	(Croatia) Davor Vugrinec 66'	Stadium: Stadion Miejski, Kraków; Referee: (Finland) Mikko Vuorela

25 August 1998 UEFA Cup; 1st round 2nd leg	Trabzonspor (Turkey)	1 - 2	(Poland) Wisła Kraków	Trabzon
20:30	(Turkey) Hüseyin Çimşir 67'	Report	(Nigeria) Sunday Ibrahim 52' (Poland) Tomasz Kulawik 62'	Stadium: Hüseyin Avni Aker Stadium; Referee: (Ukraine) Vasyl Melnychuk

== Sources ==
- Turkish Football Federation
- Trabzonspor Official Site
