= List of Trabzonspor players =

This is a list of notable players who have played for Trabzonspor Kulübü. Trabzonspor were founded in 1967 after a merger of several Trabzon based clubs. The club made their début in the 2.Lig and joined the 1.Lig for the first time seven years later.

== List of players ==
The following list includes all Trabzonspor players who have played 100 or more competitive matches for the club in league (2.Lig, 1.Lig/Süper Lig) and cup (Turkish Cup) play.

Players are listed with their first-team début and last appearance for the club, along with appearances and goals. Some dates are approximate and are listed in italics. Statistics are correct as of 6 June 2010.

Nat.	Name	First game	Final game	Apps	Goals
Turkey	Şenol Güneş	1975	1987	453	0
Turkey	Hami Mandıralı	1987	27 April 2002	416	212
Turkey	Orhan Çıkırıkçı	1989	26 May 2001	321	49
Turkey	Ünal Karaman	26 August 1990	23 May 1999	258	16
Turkey	Abdullah Ercan	23 September 1990	23 May 1999	286	16
Georgia	Shota Arveladze	1994	1997	96	61
Turkey	Fatih Tekke	25 January 1995	14 May 2006	223	101
Turkey	Metin Aktaş	23 March 1997	5 May 2003	108	0
Croatia	Davor Vugrinec	2 August 1997	21 May 2000	95	36
Turkey	Hüseyin Çimşir	2 November 1997	30 May 2009	289	7
Turkey	Gökdeniz Karadeniz	16 December 1997	29 February 2008	277	78
Turkey	Hasan Üçüncü	23 September 2001	26 April 2008	160	4
Turkey	Erman Özgür	8 August 1999	31 May 2003	116	9
Australia	Michael Petkovic	9 August 2002	7 May 2005	97	0
Turkey	Tayfun Cora	16 February 2003	Present	169	8
Guinea	Ibrahima Yattara	9 August 2003	Present	193	34
Turkey	Erdinç Yavuz	9 August 2003	26 April 2008	177	9
Turkey	Umut Bulut	5 August 2006	Present	153	69
Turkey	Serkan Balcı	12 August 2007	Present	98	2
Turkey	Turgay Semercioğlu	1973	1988	480	23
Turkey	Necati Özçağlayan	1973	1986	407	3
Turkey	Şenol Ustaömer	1980	1988	270	34
Turkey	Lemi Çelik	1983	1997	351	21
Turkey	Kemal Serdar	1983	1995	409	22
Turkey	İskender Günen	1979	1990	380	31
Turkey	Mustafa Gedik	1978	1983	144	10
Turkey	Hasan Vezir	1983	1987	131	32
