= Trabzonspor in European football =

Turkish club in European football

Trabzonspor in European football includes the matches which have been played by Trabzonspor in UEFA competitions.

== Overall record ==
As of 20 August 2026

Competition	Participations	Played	Won	Drawn	Lost	Goals for	Goals against
UEFA Champions League (Note: European Champion Clubs' Cup matches included)	10	30	10	8	12	25	36
UEFA Europa League	11	60	24	11	25	70	71
UEFA Conference League	3	8	1	4	3	7	12
UEFA Cup Winners' Cup	3	12	4	4	4	13	18
UEFA Cup	11	38	14	11	13	60	61
UEFA Intertoto Cup	2	8	3	1	4	19	12
Total	39	156	56	39	61	194	210

== Top scorers ==
Rank	Goals	Player	Date of last goal	Competition
1	23	(Turkey) Hami Mandıralı	4 August 1999	Intertoto Cup
2	9	(Brazil) Paulo Henrique	19 February 2015	Europa League
3	6	(Turkey) Hamdi Aslan	30 September 1992	Cup Winners' Cup
3	6	(Turkey) Olcan Adın	28 November 2013	Europa League
3	6	(Turkey) Orhan Çıkırıkçı	20 August 1996	UEFA Cup
6	5	(Georgia (country)) Shota Arveladze	29 October 1996	UEFA Cup
6	5	(Turkey) Ünal Karaman	24 September 1996	UEFA Cup
8	4	(Greece) Anastasios Bakasetas	3 November 2022	Europa League
8	4	(Italy) Caleb Ekuban	22 August 2019	Europa League
8	4	(Turkey) Fatih Tekke	3 August 2005	Champions League
8	4	(Turkey) Gökdeniz Karadeniz	14 September 2006	UEFA Cup
8	4	(Guinea) Ibrahima Yattara	14 July 2007	Intertoto Cup
8	4	(Turkey) Ogün Temizkanoğlu	30 September 1997	UEFA Cup
8	4	(Turkey) Orhan Kaynak	1 November 1994	UEFA Cup

== Record by country ==
As of 20 August 2026

Rank	Country	Played	Won	Drawn	Lost	Goals for	Goals against	Opponents
1	Italy	18	3	5	10	14	27	Cagliari (2), Inter Milan (4), Juventus (2), Lazio (4), Napoli (2), Perugia (2), Roma (2)
2	Spain	15	2	5	8	10	24	Athletic Bilbao (3), Atlético Madrid (2), Barcelona (2), Deportivo La Coruña (2), Getafe (2), Osasuna (2), Villarreal (2)
3	France	8	4	2	2	16	11	Lille (2), Lyon (2), Monaco (2), Toulouse (2)
3	Germany	8	1	2	5	11	22	VfL Bochum (2), Hamburger SV (2), 1. FC Kaiserslautern (2), Schalke 04 (2)
3	Poland	8	3	0	5	8	14	Legia Warsaw (4), Szombierki Bytom (2), Wisła Kraków (2)
3	Ukraine	8	4	1	3	9	10	Dnipro (2), Dynamo Kyiv (4), Metalist Kharkiv (2)
7	Cyprus	6	4	1	1	10	7	Anorthosis Famagusta (2), APOEL (2), Apollon Limassol (2)
7	Denmark	6	1	2	3	3	6	Copenhagen (6) (Note: In 1992, Boldklubben 1903 was merged with Kjøbenhavns Boldklub (KB) to form the current club F.C. Copenhagen.)
7	England	6	2	0	4	4	8	Aston Villa (2), Liverpool (4)
7	Russia	6	1	2	3	3	8	CSKA Moscow (2), Krasnodar (2), Rostov (2)
7	Switzerland	6	1	3	2	4	7	Basel (4), St. Gallen (2)
12	Hungary	5	1	2	2	3	4	Ferencváros (3), Videoton (2)
13	Albania	4	4	0	0	15	1	Kukësi (2), Vllaznia Shkodër (2)
13	Croatia	4	1	1	2	4	5	Dinamo Zagreb (2), Hajduk Split (2)
13	Ireland	4	3	1	0	10	3	Bray Wanderers (2), Derry City (2)
13	Norway	4	2	2	0	9	6	Bodø/Glimt (2), Molde (2)
13	Romania	4	1	1	2	7	8	Dinamo București (2), Oțelul Galați (2)
13	Slovakia	4	3	0	1	8	3	Ružomberok (2), Slovan Bratislava (2)
19	Austria	2	0	0	2	0	3	Rapid Wien (2)
19	Belarus	2	1	1	0	1	0	Dinamo Minsk (2)
19	Belgium	2	1	1	0	3	1	Lokeren (2)
19	Czech Republic	2	1	1	0	4	3	Sparta Prague (2)
19	Finland	2	1	1	0	4	2	TPS (2)
19	Greece	2	1	0	1	3	3	AEK Athens (2)
19	Iceland	2	2	0	0	6	3	ÍA (2)
19	Latvia	2	1	1	0	4	1	Skonto (2)
19	Lithuania	2	1	1	0	3	2	Žalgiris (2)
19	Luxembourg	2	2	0	0	3	1	Differdange 03 (2)
19	Malta	2	2	0	0	6	2	Valletta (2)
19	Netherlands	2	0	0	2	2	6	PSV Eindhoven (2)
19	North Macedonia	2	0	1	1	1	2	Rabotnički (2)
19	Portugal	2	0	1	1	1	3	Benfica (2)
19	Scotland	2	1	1	0	2	1	Dundee United (2)
19	Serbia	2	1	0	1	3	3	Red Star Belgrade (2)

== Most played teams ==
Rank	Team	Country	Played	Won	Drawn	Lost	Goals for	Goals against
1	Copenhagen	DEN	6	1	2	3	3	6
2	Basel	SUI	4	1	1	2	3	6
2	Dynamo Kyiv	UKR	4	1	1	2	3	5
2	Inter Milan	ITA	4	2	1	1	3	3
2	Lazio	ITA	4	0	2	2	5	7
2	Legia Warsaw	POL	4	2	0	2	4	3
2	Liverpool	ENG	4	1	0	3	2	6
8	Athletic Bilbao	ESP	3	1	1	1	3	4
8	Ferencváros	HUN	3	1	0	2	3	4

== Results ==
=== Seasonal matches ===
Competition	Round	Opponent	Home	Away	Aggregate
1976–77 European Cup	First round	(Iceland) ÍA	3–1	3–2	6–3
1976–77 European Cup	Second round	(England) Liverpool	1–0	0–3	1–3
1977–78 European Cup	Round of 32	(Denmark) B 1903	1–0	0–2	1–2
1979–80 European Cup	Round of 32	(Croatia) Hajduk Split	0–1	0–1	0–2
1980–81 European Cup	Round of 32	(Poland) Szombierki Bytom	2–1	0–3	2–4
1981–82 European Cup	Round of 32	(Ukraine) Dynamo Kyiv	1–1	0–1	1–2
1982–83 UEFA Cup	Round of 64	(West Germany) 1. FC Kaiserslautern	0–3	0–3	0–6
1983–84 UEFA Cup	Round of 64	(Italy) Inter Milan	1–0	0–2	1–2
1984–85 European Cup	Round of 32	(Ukraine) Dnipro Dnipropetrovsk	1–0	0–3	1–3
1990–91 Cup Winners' Cup	Qualifying round	(Republic of Ireland) Bray Wanderers	2–0	1–1	3–1
1990–91 Cup Winners' Cup	Round of 32	(Spain) Barcelona	1–0	2–7	3–7
1991–92 UEFA Cup	Round of 64	(Croatia) Dinamo Zagreb	1–1	3–2	4–3
1991–92 UEFA Cup	Round of 32	(France) Lyon	4–1	4–3	8–4
1991–92 UEFA Cup	Round of 16	(Denmark) B 1903	1–1	0–1	1–2
1992–93 Cup Winners' Cup	Round of 32	(Finland) TPS	2–0	2–2	4–2
1992–93 Cup Winners' Cup	Round of 16	(Spain) Atlético Madrid	0–2	0–0	0–2
1993–94 UEFA Cup	Round of 64	(Malta) Valletta	3–1	3–1	6–2
1993–94 UEFA Cup	Round of 32	(Italy) Cagliari	1–1	0–0	1–1 (a)
1994–95 UEFA Cup	Round of 64	(Romania) Dinamo București	2–1	3–3	5–4
1994–95 UEFA Cup	Round of 32	(England) Aston Villa	1–0	1–2	2–2 (a)
1994–95 UEFA Cup	Round of 16	(Italy) Lazio	1–2	1–2	2–4
1995–96 Cup Winners' Cup	Round of 32	(Lithuania) Žalgiris	1–0	2–2	3–2
1995–96 Cup Winners' Cup	Round of 16	(Spain) Deportivo La Coruña	0–1	0–3	0–4
1996–97 UEFA Cup	Qualifying round	(Slovakia) Slovan Bratislava	4–1	1–2	5–3
1996–97 UEFA Cup	Round of 64	(Norway) Bodø/Glimt	3–1	2–1	5–2
1996–97 UEFA Cup	Round of 32	(Germany) Schalke 04	3–3	0–1	3–4
1997–98 UEFA Cup	Second qualifying round	(Scotland) Dundee United	1–0	1–1	2–1
1997–98 UEFA Cup	Round of 64	(Germany) VfL Bochum	2–1	3–5	5–6
1998–99 UEFA Cup	Second qualifying round	(Poland) Wisła Kraków	1–2	1–5	2–7
1999 Intertoto Cup	Third round	(Italy) Perugia	1–2	1–3 (a.e.t.) (0–3) (Note: The match was abandoned in the 114th minute of extra time due to some objects being thrown on the pitch, witg some even hitting the referee. UEFA banned Perugia and awarded a 3–0 win to Trabzonspor.)	4–2
1999 Intertoto Cup	Semi-finals	(Germany) Hamburger SV	2–2	1–4	3–6
2003–04 UEFA Cup	First round	(Spain) Villarreal	0–0	2–3	2–3
2004–05 Champions League	Second qualifying round	(Latvia) Skonto	3–0	1–1	4–1
2004–05 Champions League	Third qualifying round	(Ukraine) Dynamo Kyiv	0–2	2–1	2–3
2004–05 UEFA Cup	First round	(Spain) Athletic Bilbao	3–2	0–2	3–4
2005–06 Champions League	Second qualifying round	(Cyprus) Anorthosis Famagusta	1–0	1–3	2–3
2006–07 UEFA Cup	Second qualifying round	(Cyprus) APOEL	1–0	1–1	2–1
2006–07 UEFA Cup	First round	(Spain) Osasuna	2–2	0–0	2–2 (a)
2007 Intertoto Cup	Second round	(Albania) Vllaznia Shkodër	6–0	4–0	10–0
2007 Intertoto Cup	Third round	(Romania) Oțelul Galați	1–2	1–2	2–4
2009–10 Europa League	Play-off round	(France) Toulouse	1–3	1–0	2–3
2010–11 Europa League	Play-off round	(England) Liverpool	1–2	0–1	1–3
2011–12 Champions League	Third qualifying round	(Portugal) Benfica	1–1	0–2	1–3
2011–12 Europa League	Play-off round	(Spain) Athletic Bilbao	N/A	0–0	N/A (Note: Fenerbahçe, the 2010–11 Süper Lig champions, was banned by the Turkish Football Federation on 24 August 2011 from participating in the 2011–12 UEFA Champions League due to the ongoing investigation into match-fixing. UEFA decided to replace them in the group stage with Trabzonspor, the league runners-up, who had lost in the Champions League third qualifying round and were participating in the Europa League play-off round at that time.)
2011–12 Champions League	Group stage	(Italy) Inter Milan	1–1	1–0	3rd
2011–12 Champions League	Group stage	(France) Lille	1–1	0–0	3rd
2011–12 Champions League	Group stage	(Russia) CSKA Moscow	0–0	0–3	3rd
2011–12 Europa League	Round of 32	(Netherlands) PSV Eindhoven	1–2	1–4	2–6
2012–13 Europa League	Play-off round	(Hungary) Videoton	0–0	0–0 (a.e.t.)	0–0 (3–5 p)
2013–14 Europa League	Second qualifying round	(Republic of Ireland) Derry City	4–2	3–0	7–2
2013–14 Europa League	Third qualifying round	(Belarus) Dinamo Minsk	0–0	1–0	1–0
2013–14 Europa League	Play-off round	(Albania) Kukësi	3–1	2–0	5–1
2013–14 Europa League	Group stage	(Cyprus) Apollon Limassol	4–2	2–1	1st
2013–14 Europa League	Group stage	(Italy) Lazio	3–3	0–0	1st
2013–14 Europa League	Group stage	(Poland) Legia Warsaw	2–0	2–0	1st
2013–14 Europa League	Round of 32	(Italy) Juventus	0–2	0–2	0–4
2014–15 Europa League	Play-off round	(Russia) Rostov	2–0	0–0	2–0
2014–15 Europa League	Group stage	(Ukraine) Metalist Kharkiv	3–1	2–1	2nd
2014–15 Europa League	Group stage	(Poland) Legia Warsaw	0–1	0–2	2nd
2014–15 Europa League	Group stage	(Belgium) Lokeren	2–0	1–1	2nd
2014–15 Europa League	Round of 32	(Italy) Napoli	0–4	0–1	0–5
2015–16 Europa League	Second qualifying round	(Luxembourg) Differdange 03	1–0	2–1	3–1
2015–16 Europa League	Third qualifying round	(North Macedonia) Rabotnički	1–1 (a.e.t.)	0–1	1–2
2019–20 Europa League	Third qualifying round	(Czech Republic) Sparta Prague	2–1	2–2	4–3
2019–20 Europa League	Play-off round	(Greece) AEK Athens	0–2	3–1	3–3 (a)
2019–20 Europa League	Group stage	(Spain) Getafe	0–1	0–1	4th
2019–20 Europa League	Group stage	(Switzerland) Basel	2–2	0–2	4th
2019–20 Europa League	Group stage	(Russia) Krasnodar	0–2	1–3	4th
2021–22 Europa Conference League	Third qualifying round	(Norway) Molde	3–3	1–1 (a.e.t.)	4–4 (4–3 p)
2021–22 Europa Conference League	Play-off round	(Italy) Roma	1–2	0–3	1–5
2022–23 Champions League	Play-off round	(Denmark) Copenhagen	0–0	1–2	1–2
2022–23 Europa League	Group stage	(Hungary) Ferencváros	1–0	2–3	3rd
2022–23 Europa League	Group stage	(Serbia) Red Star Belgrade	2–1	1–2	3rd
2022–23 Europa League	Group stage	(France) Monaco	4–0	1–3	3rd
2022–23 Europa Conference League	Round of 32	(Switzerland) Basel	1–0	0–2	1–2
2024–25 Europa League	Second qualifying round	(Slovakia) Ružomberok	1–0	2–0	3–0
2024–25 Europa League	Third qualifying round	(Austria) Rapid Wien	0–1	0–2	0–3
2024–25 Conference League	Play-off round	(Switzerland) St. Gallen	1–1 (a.e.t.)	0–0	1–1 (4–5 p)
2026–27 Europa League	Play-off round	(Hungary) Ferencváros	0–1	4-0	5-0
UEFA club coefficient: 11,000 (118th) (as per 2024–25 season)
