= Merthan Açıl =

Turkish footballer (born 1982)

Personal information
- Full name: Merthan Açıl
- Date of birth: February 15, 1982 (age 44)
- Place of birth: Istanbul, Turkey
- Height: 1.80 m (5 ft 11 in)
- Position: Defensive midfielder

Senior career*
Years	Team	Apps	(Gls)
2000–2002	Bakırköyspor	46	(1)
2002–2006	Çaykur Rizespor	17	(0)
2004–2005	→ İstanbul B.B. (loan)	9	(0)
2005–2006	→ Giresunspor (loan)	20	(0)
2006–2012	Kasımpaşa	125	(7)
2012–2016	Adanaspor	130	(9)
2016–2019	Ümraniyespor	81	(3)
2019–2020	BB Erzurumspor	6	(0)
- * Club domestic league appearances and goals as of 18 July 2020

Merthan Açıl (born 15 February 1982) is a Turkish former professional footballer. Since retiring, he has worked in an advisory role at Premier League club Hull City.
