= Hans Somers =

Belgian footballer (born 1978)

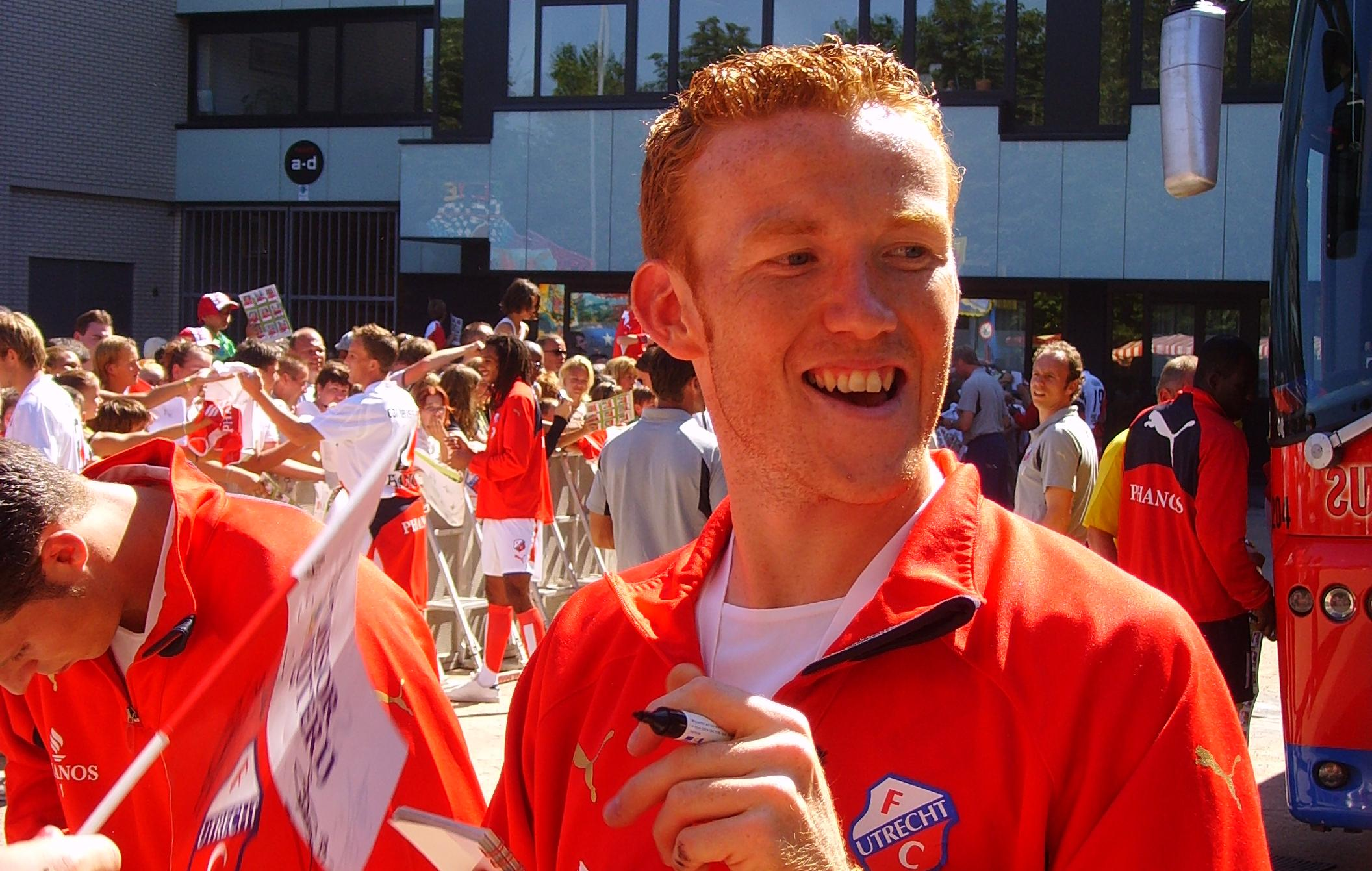
- Somers with FC Utrecht in 2007

Personal information
- Date of birth: 9 March 1978 (age 48)
- Place of birth: Mechelen, Belgium
- Height: 1.83 m (6 ft 0 in)
- Position: Midfielder

Youth career
- 1985–1989: VC Rijmenam
- 1989–1996: Lierse

Senior career*
| Years | Team | Apps | (Gls) |
| 1996–2001 | Lierse | 97 | (21) |
| 2001–2004 | Trabzonspor | 70 | (9) |
| 2004–2010 | Utrecht | 119 | (10) |
| 2011–2015 | KSV Schriek | | |
| 2015–2016 | Tielt-Winge 3000 | | |

Managerial career
- 2017–2018: Hasselt
- 2018–2020: Genk (U-18)
- 2020–2023: Genk (U-21)
- 2023: OH Leuven (assistant)
- 2023–2024: Deinze
- 2024: OH Leuven (caretaker)
- 2025: OH Leuven (caretaker)
- * Club domestic league appearances and goals

Hans Somers (born 9 March 1978) is a Belgian professional footballer and coach, who is currently director of the youth department at OH Leuven.

== Playing career ==
Somers started his professional career with Lierse, where he played for five seasons, and was a regular in three of those seasons. A midfielder, his strengths were in the passing game. During his time at Utrecht, he became renowned for his long throw-in. After his stint at Lierse, Somers left for Turkey where he started playing for Trabzonspor. There too, he became an established starter in midfield. After three seasons with Trabzonspor, Somers moved to the Dutch Eredivisie in 2004 where he played for Utrecht. One of his most memorable moments at the club came in the 2004 Johan Cruyff Shield against Ajax; his official debut for the club. Somers came on as a substitute when Utrecht were losing 2–1, and promptly scored twice to put them 3–2 up. They went on to win 4–2. In the regular season, however, he would score only twice in 27 appearances, something he would repeat in the following seasons.

After leaving Utrecht, Somers moved to Belgian lower-league club KSV Schriek in October 2011.

== Managerial career ==
Somers started his career as head coach of Hasselt. From 2018 until 2023, he worked as a coach for KRC Genk U18 and later also the U21 team of the club, Young Genk, in the Challenger Pro League. During those 5 years, he was crowned champion 4 times and reached the UEFA Youth League round of 16 twice.

In June 2023, it was confirmed, that Somers would become the assistant coach of Marc Brys at Oud-Heverlee Leuven from the beginning of the 2023–24 season, replacing Sven Swinnen. However, on 6 October 2023, the club announced that they mutually decided to part ways with Somers. On 14 November 2023, Somers took charge of Challenger Pro League side Deinze, replacing Marc Grosjean.

== Honours ==
Lierse

- Belgian Cup: 1998–99
- Belgian Super Cup: 1999

Trabzonspor

- Turkish Cup: 2002–03, 2003–04

Utrecht

- Johan Cruyff Shield: 2004
