= Serkan Karababa =

Turkish footballer

Personal information
- Date of birth: 18 December 1975 (age 50)
- Place of birth: İzmir, Turkey
- Position: Defender

Senior career*
Years	Team	Apps	(Gls)
1994–1995	Yeni Bornovaspor		
1995–2000	Altay		
2000–2002	Samsunspor		
2002	Diyarbakırspor		
2003	Kayserispor		
2004–2005	Altınordu		
2005–2008	Yeni Bornovaspor		
- * Club domestic league appearances and goals

Serkan Karababa (born 18 December 1975) is a Turkish retired football defender.
