= Ibrahim Bohari =

Central African Republic footballer

Personal information
- Date of birth: 21 January 1978 (age 48)
- Place of birth: Bangui, Central African Republic
- Position: Forward

Senior career*
Years	Team	Apps	(Gls)
1994–1998	R.E. Mouscron		
1998–1999	Altay S.K.	29	(9)
1999–2000	K.V. Kortrijk		
2001–2002	K.R.C. Zuid-West-Vlaanderen		
- * Club domestic league appearances and goals

Ibrahim Bohari (born 21 January 1978) is a retired Central African Republic football striker.
