= Feridun Sungur =

Turkish footballer (born 1984)

Personal information
- Date of birth: 2 January 1984 (age 42)
- Place of birth: Arsin, Turkey
- Height: 1.77 m (5 ft 10 in)
- Position: Defender

Senior career*
Years	Team	Apps	(Gls)
2002–2003	Trabzonspor	2	(0)
2003–2004	Akçaabat Sebatspor	1	(0)
2004	Karşıyaka	6	(0)
2004–2005	Elazığspor	25	(0)
2005–2008	Trabzonspor	3	(0)
2007–2008	→ Samsunspor (loan)	34	(3)
2008–2009	Denizlispor	11	(0)
2009–2010	Giresunspor	21	(0)
2010	Karşıyaka	7	(1)
2011–2012	Giresunspor	8	(0)
2011	→ Mağusa Türk Gücü (loan)	11	(3)
2012	→ Lefke TSK (loan)	12	(2)
2012–2013	Çamlıdere Şeker	8	(0)
2013	Tokatspor	6	(0)
2013–2014	Sarıyer	28	(1)
2015	Düzyurtspor	11	(0)
2015–2016	Arhavispor		
2016–2017	Eyüpspor	3	(0)
2017–2018	Dersim 62 Spor		
2018	Mehmetçik		
2018–2019	Haçka		
- * Club domestic league appearances and goals

Feridun Sungur (born 2 January 1984) is a Turkish former professional footballer who played as a defender, spending most of his career in Turkey.

== Career ==
Sungur was born in Arsin, Turkey.

In July 2005 he returned to his former Trabzonspor.

He has also played for A. Sebatspor, Karşıyaka S.K., Elazığspor and Giresunspor.
