= Ahmet Dursun =

Turkish former professional footballer

Personal information
- Date of birth: 25 January 1978 (age 48)
- Place of birth: Gelsenkirchen, West Germany
- Height: 1.77 m (5 ft 10 in)
- Position: Striker

Senior career*
Years	Team	Apps	(Gls)
1995–1996	SG Wattenscheid 09	4	(0)
1996–1999	Kocaelispor	73	(27)
1999–2003	Beşiktaş	102	(53)
2004	Tianjin Teda	3	(0)
2004	İstanbulspor	8	(5)
2005–2006	Beşiktaş	20	(2)
2006–2007	Etimesgut Şekerspor	11	(6)
2006–2007	Antalyaspor	11	(2)
2007	MKE Ankaragücü	9	(1)
2008–2009	Kocaelispor	11	(3)
2009–2010	FK Khazar Lenkoran	10	(5)
2010	Adanaspor	9	(3)
2011	Eyüpspor	23	(8)

International career
2000	Turkey	3	(0)
- * Club domestic league appearances and goals

Ahmet Dursun (born 25 January 1978) is a Turkish former professional footballer.

== Career ==
Dursun started his career in Germany when he signed for SG Wattenscheid 09. In 1996, he was transferred to the Turkish club Kocaelispor and he was selected for the Turkey national under-21 football team. In the 1999–2000 season, he was signed by Istanbul club Beşiktaş J.K. and he scored 21 goals in his first season. After such a successful year, the pressure of maintaining that high level of football got to him and he transferred to a China to play for Tianjin Teda.

Dursun made his comeback in the 2004–05 season signing on with another Istanbul club, Istanbulspor. Before the second half of the season could even begin, Beşiktaş J.K. immediately re-signed him.
