= Tamer Tuna (footballer, born 1976) =

Turkish footballer and coach

Personal information
- Date of birth: 1 July 1976 (age 50)
- Place of birth: Hanak, Turkey
- Height: 1.72 m (5 ft 7 1/2 in)
- Position: Midfielder

Youth career
- 1985–1994: Galatasaray

Senior career*
Years	Team	Apps	(Gls)
1994–1995	Petrol Ofisi	12	(1)
1995–1997	Denizlispor	63	(7)
1997–1999	Dardanelspor	44	(3)
1999–2001	Trabzonspor	60	(8)
2001–2003	Beşiktaş	27	(0)
2003–2004	Bursaspor	33	(1)
2004–2005	Samsunspor	19	(0)
2005	Terek Grozny	20	(0)
2005–2006	Samsunspor	16	(4)
2006	Şekerspor	7	(0)
2006–2007	Gaziantepspor	1	(0)
2007–2008	İstanbulspor	20	(4)
2008–2010	Dardanelspor	8	(2)
Total		330	(30)

International career
1996–1997	Turkey-21	17	(0)
2000	Turkey	1	(0)

Managerial career
- 2012–2013: Dardanelspor
- 2013–2014: Gaziantepspor (assistant)
- 2014–2015: Sivasspor (assistant)
- 2015–2017: Beşiktaş (assistant)
- 2017–2018: Göztepe
- 2018: Sivasspor
- 2019: Göztepe
- 2020: Antalyaspor
- 2021–2022: Bursaspor
- * Club domestic league appearances and goals

Tamer Tuna (born 1 July 1976) is a Turkish football coach and a former player.

== Honours ==
=== Player honours ===
Beşiktaş

- Süper Lig (1): 2002–03

=== Managerial honours ===
Dardanelspor

- TFF Third League Play-off winner (1): 2012–13

== Managerial statistics ==
As of 27 February 2019

Team	From	To	Record				
Team	From	To	G	W	D	L	Win %
Dardanelspor	2012	2013	49	23	16	10	46.94
Göztepe	2017	2018	35	13	10	12	37.14
Sivasspor	2018	2018	12	2	5	5	16.67
Göztepe	2019	Present	0	0	0	0	—
Total			96	38	31	27	39.58
