= Tayfun Cora =

Turkish footballer

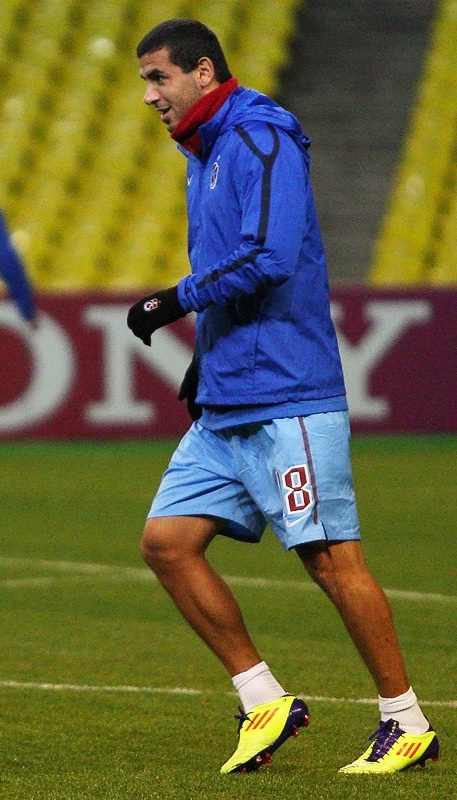

Personal information
- Full name: Tayfun Cora
- Date of birth: December 5, 1983 (age 42)
- Place of birth: Vakfıkebir, Turkey
- Height: 1.82 m (5 ft 11 1/2 in)
- Positions: Right back; centre back

Youth career
- 1999–2002: Trabzonspor

Senior career*
Years	Team	Apps	(Gls)
2002–2012	Trabzonspor	127	(7)
2006–2007	→ Kayserispor (loan)	30	(0)
2013–2014	Karşıyaka	20	(1)
2014	Manisaspor	4	(0)

International career
2006	Turkey A2	1	(0)
- * Club domestic league appearances and goals as of 10 August 2015

Tayfun Cora (born 5 December 1983 in Vakfıkebir) is a retired Turkish footballer.

== Career ==
Tayfun plays for Trabzonspor, where he promoted from youth team. He made the step up to the first team in his teenage years, and is also a regular in the Turkish under-21 team. Although he was not established in the Trabzonspor team, he still made regular appearances. He is usually used as a central defender or a right back. He was loaned to Kayserispor for a year and he is back with the Trabzonspor.

== Honours ==
=== Club ===
Trabzonspor

- Turkish Cup: 2002–03, 2003–04
