= 2002–03 Turkish Cup =

Türkiye Kupası

Tournament details
- Country: Turkey
- Teams: 48

Final positions
- Champions: Trabzonspor
- Runners-up: Gençlerbirliği

Tournament statistics
- Top goal scorer(s): Ahmed Hassan; Mehmet Yılmaz (8 goals each)

The 2002–03 Turkish Cup was the 41st edition of the annual tournament that determined the association football Super League (Süper Lig) Turkish Cup (Turkish: Türkiye Kupası) champion under the auspices of the Turkish Football Federation (Turkish: Türkiye Futbol Federasyonu; TFF). Trabzonspor successfully contested Gençlerbirliği 3–1 in the final. The results of the tournament also determined which clubs would be promoted or relegated.

== First round ==
Team 1	Score	Team 2
Elazığspor	3–0	Siirtspor
Sakaryaspor	1–0	İstanbul BB
Gaziosmanpaşa	1–0	Darıca Gençlerbirliği
İzmirspor	1–4	Altay
Çanakkale Dardanelspor	2–1	Vestel Manisaspor
Antalya Kepezspor	3–0	Antalyaspor
Konyaspor	3–1	Aydınspor
Çankırı Belediyespor	1–0	Şekerspor
Ankara BB	2–1	Türk Telekom
Sivasspor	2–0	Kayserispor
Yimpaş Yozgatspor	1–0	Kayseri Erciyesspor
Hatayspor	2–1	Adanaspor
Mersin İdman Yurdu	1–2 (aet)	Gaziantep BB
Erzincanspor	0–3	Erzurumspor
Akçaabat Sebatspor	1–5	Çaykur Rizespor
Şanlıurfaspor	1–0	Batman Petrolspor

== Second round ==
Team 1	Score	Team 2
Ankaragücü	4–2	Hatayspor
Altay	1–2	Kocaelispor
Gaziantep BB	2–4	Trabzonspor
Konyaspor	1–0	Fenerbahçe
Şanlıurfaspor	3–1	Çankırı Belediyespor
Samsunspor	3–1	Çanakkale Dardanelspor
Sakaryaspor	0–3	Malatyaspor
İstanbulspor	0–1	Sivasspor
Göztepe	2–1	Gümüşhane Doğanspor
Gençlerbirliği	2–1	Erzurumspor
Çaykur Rizespor	2–1	Gaziantepspor
Diyarbakırspor	2–0	Gaziosmanpaşa
Antalya Kepezspor	0–4	Denizlispor
Ankara BB	2–1	Bursaspor
Yimpaş Yozgatspor	1–3	Galatasaray
Elazığspor	0–2	Beşiktaş

== Third round ==
Team 1	Score	Team 2
Çaykur Rizespor	1–0	Samsunspor
Malatyaspor	3–1	Şanlıurfaspor
Konyaspor	2–2 (3–4 p)	Kocaelispor
Gençlerbirliği	6–0	Göztepe
Diyarbakırspor	1–2	Ankara BB
Trabzonspor	5–2	Sivasspor
Denizlispor	1–2	Beşiktaş
Galatasaray	1–0	Ankaragücü

== Bracket ==
Quarter-finals
Çaykur Rizespor (p)	1
Kocaelispor	1
Beşiktaş	3
Gençlerbirliği (a.e.t.)	4
Galatasaray	1
Malatyaspor	2
Trabzonspor	7
Ankara BB	1

Semi-finals
Çaykur Rizespor	1
Gençlerbirliği (a.e.t.)	2
Malatyaspor	0
Trabzonspor	3

Final
Gençlerbirliği	1
Trabzonspor	3

== Quarter-finals ==
Team 1	Score	Team 2
Galatasaray	1–2	Malatyaspor
Çaykur Rizespor	1–1 (4–1 p)	Kocaelispor
Trabzonspor	7–1	Ankara BB
Beşiktaş	3–4 (aet)	Gençlerbirliği

== Semi-finals ==
=== Summary table ===
Team 1	Score	Team 2
Çaykur Rizespor	1–2 (aet)	Gençlerbirliği
Malatyaspor	0–3	Trabzonspor

=== Matches ===
9 April 2003 Semi-final	Çaykur Rizespor	1–2 (a.e.t.)	Gençlerbirliği	Rize, Turkey
17:30 EEST (UTC+03)	Merthan 68'		Veysel 36'; Hassan 93'	Stadium: Rize Atatürk Stadium; Referee: Cüneyt Çakır

9 April 2003 Semi-final	Malatyaspor	0–3	Trabzonspor	Malatya, Turkey
20:00 EEST (UTC+03)			Tayfun 31'; Mehmet 42'; Fatih 65'	Stadium: Malatya İnönü Stadium; Referee: İsmet Arzuman

== Final ==
23 April 2003 Final	Gençlerbirliği	1–3	Trabzonspor	Antalya, Turkey
20:30 EEST (UTC+03)	Hassan 44'		Mehmet 9'; Gökdeniz 31', 70'	Stadium: Antalya Atatürk Stadium; Attendance: 10,000; Referee: Mustafa Çulcu
