= Malatya İnönü Stadium =

Demolished multi-purpose stadium in Malatya, Turkey

Coordinates: 38°21′07.84″N 38°19′49.78″E

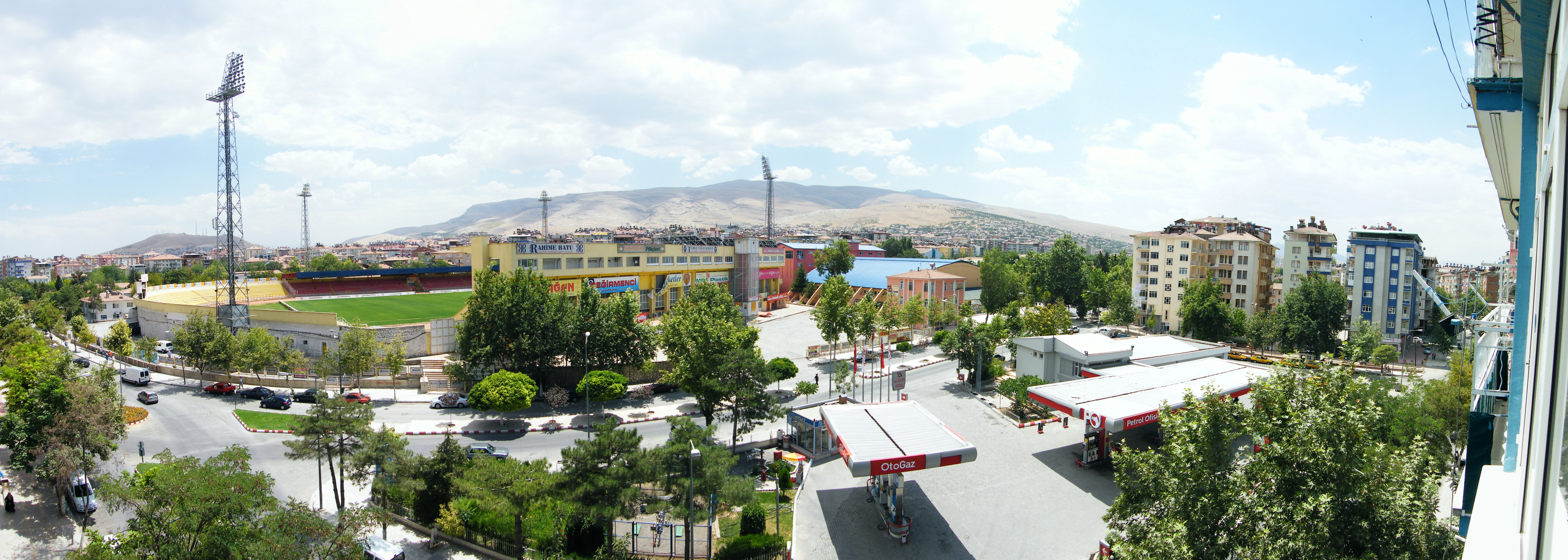
- Interactive map of Malatya İnönü Stadium
- Location: Malatya, Turkey
- Owner: Malatyaspor; Yeni Malatyaspor
- Capacity: 13,000
- Surface: Grass

Construction
- Opened: 1970
- Demolished: 2018

Malatya İnönü Stadium (Turkish: Malatya İnönü Stadı) was a multi-purpose stadium in Malatya, Turkey. It was used mostly for football matches and was the home ground of Yeni Malatyaspor, who moved to the new Malatya Arena. The stadium held 13,000 people. It was named after the Turkish statesman İsmet İnönü. It was demolished in November 2018.
