= Nesim Özgür =

Turkish-Bulgarian footballer

Nesim Neshadov (Nesim Özgür)
Personal information
- Date of birth: 8 June 1973 (age 53)
- Place of birth: Kardzhali, Bulgaria
- Height: 1.81 m (5 ft 11 in)
- Position: Defender

Senior career*
Years	Team	Apps	(Gls)
1992–1999	İstanbulspor	197	(5)
1999–2001	Trabzonspor	39	(1)
2001	Malatyaspor	14	(0)
2002	Litex Lovech	15	(1)
2002–2004	Lokomotiv Plovdiv	13	(1)
2004–2005	Bursaspor	1	(0)
Total		279	(8)

International career
1994	Turkey U21	1	(0)
2002	Bulgaria	1	(0)
- * Club domestic league appearances and goals

Nesim Özgür or Nesim Neshadov (Bulgarian: Несим Нешадов) (born 8 June 1973) is a former Turkish-Bulgarian footballer. He played for the Süper Lig clubs İstanbulspor, Trabzonspor, Malatyaspor and Bursaspor. He also played for Litex Lovech and Lokomotiv Plovdiv in his birth country Bulgaria.
