= Hasan Üçüncü =

Turkish footballer

Personal information
- Full name: Hasan Üçüncü
- Date of birth: November 16, 1980 (age 45)
- Place of birth: Sürmene, Turkey
- Height: 1.77 m (5 ft 9 1/2 in)
- Positions: Defender; defensive midfielder

Youth career
- Trabzonspor

Senior career*
Years	Team	Apps	(Gls)
1998–2008	Trabzonspor	145	(2)
2000–01	→ A. Sebatspor (loan)	32	(0)
2008–09	Ankaragücü	4	(0)
2009	Giresunspor	9	(0)
2010	Çaykur Rizespor	6	(0)
2010–2013	Mersin İdmanyurdu	33	(1)
2013–2014	Orduspor	13	(0)

International career^{‡}
1999	Turkey U19	2	(0)
1997–98	Turkey U18	23	(0)
1996–98	Turkey U17	11	(0)
1995–97	Turkey U16	30	(0)
1995–96	Turkey U15	7	(0)
- * Club domestic league appearances and goals as of August 29, 2010 ‡ National team caps and goals as of June 7, 2008

Hasan Üçüncü (born November 16, 1980) is a retired Turkish footballer. Üçüncü was born in Sürmene, Trabzon Province. Standing at 177 cm and weighing 74 kg, he wears the # 15 jersey and plays in the midfield position. He assisted Gökdeniz Karadeniz's goal against Galatasaray in the second half of the 2005-2006 Süper Lig season, helping Gökdeniz come back from a long suspension.

== Honours ==
=== Club ===
Trabzonspor

- Turkish Cup: 2002–03
