= Selahattin Kınalı =

Turkish footballer

Personal information
- Full name: Selahattin Kınalı
- Date of birth: 15 May 1978 (age 48)
- Place of birth: Araklı, Trabzon, Turkey
- Height: 1.78 m (5 ft 10 in)
- Position: Forward

Senior career*
Years	Team	Apps	(Gls)
1996–1997	Gümüşhanespor	25	(11)
1997–2000	Trabzonspor	67	(12)
2000–2002	Antalyaspor	37	(12)
2002–2003	Trabzonspor	10	(0)
2003–2005	Akçaabat Sebatspor	56	(11)
2005–2006	Karşıyaka	9	(7)
2006–2009	Denizlispor	74	(11)
Total		278	(64)

International career^{‡}
1998–1999	Turkey U21	7	(3)
1997	Turkey Olympic	1	(0)
- * Club domestic league appearances and goals as of 22 February 2011 ‡ National team caps and goals as of 22 February 2011

Selahattin Kınalı (born 15 May 1978) is a former Turkish professional footballer. He played for several clubs in Turkey, scoring 64 goals in 278 matches.

== Personal life ==
Kınalı is distantly related to the Turkish footballer Safa Kınalı.
