= Osman Özköylü =

Turkish footballer and manager

Personal information
- Date of birth: 26 August 1971 (age 55)
- Place of birth: Aydın, Turkey
- Height: 1.88 m (6 ft 2 in)
- Position: Defender

Team information
- Current team: Antalyaspor (head coach)

Senior career*
Years	Team	Apps	(Gls)
1990–1993	Aydınspor	40	(1)
1993–2002	Trabzonspor	176	(10)
2002–2004	Samsunspor	35	(2)
2004	Kayserispor	1	(0)
2004–2005	Kocaelispor	13	(1)
2005–2006	Etimesgut Şekerspor	20	(6)
2006–2007	Uşakspor	21	(2)
Total		306	(22)

International career
1995–2000	Turkey	13	(0)

Managerial career
- 2007: Turanspor
- 2008: Erzurumspor
- 2009–2010: Körfez İskenderunspor
- 2010–2011: Elazığspor
- 2011–2012: Denizlispor
- 2012–2013: Kayseri Erciyesspor
- 2013–2014: Ankaraspor
- 2015: Şanlıurfaspor
- 2015–2016: Adana Demirspor
- 2016: Sivasspor
- 2016–2017: Samsunspor
- 2017: Erzurum BB
- 2017–2018: Adanaspor
- 2018: Denizlispor
- 2018–2019: Osmanlıspor
- 2019–2020: Boluspor
- 2020–2021: Hekimoğlu Trabzon
- 2021: Altay
- 2021–2023: Pendikspor
- 2023: Manisa
- 2024: Pendikspor
- 2024–2025: Iğdır
- 2025–2026: Esenler Erokspor
- 2026–: Antalyaspor
- * Club domestic league appearances and goals

Osman Özköylü (born 26 August 1971) is a Turkish football coach and former player who is the manager of TFF 1. Lig club Antalyaspor.

He played for Aydınspor (1990–1993), Trabzonspor (1993–2002), Samsunspor (2002–2004), Kayserispor (2004), Kocaelispor (2004–2005), Etimesgut Şekerspor (2005–2006) and Uşakspor (2006–2007). He played for Turkey national football team 13 times and was a participant at the 2000 UEFA European Championship.

== Managerial statistics ==
As of 4 January 2015

Team	From	To	Record				
Team	From	To	G	W	D	L	Win %
Elazığspor	2010	2011	34	19	10	5	55.88
Denizlispor	2011	2012	29	10	11	8	34.48
Kayseri Erciyesspor	2012	2013	37	21	6	10	56.76
Ankaraspor	2013	2014	53	26	17	10	49.06
Şanlıurfaspor	2015	2015	15	6	6	3	40.00
Adana Demirspor	2015	2016	23	11	6	6	47.83
Total			29	10	7	12	34.48

== Honours ==
=== Player honours ===
- Turkish Cup 1995
- Turkish Super Cup 1995
- Chancellor Cup 1994, 1996
- Turkey
  - UEFA Euro 2000 Quarter-Finalist

=== Managerial honours ===
Elazığspor

- TFF Second League: 2010-2011 Winners

Kayseri Erciyesspor

- TFF First League: 2012-2013 Winners
