= Erman Özgür =

Turkish footballer and pundit

Personal information
- Date of birth: April 13, 1977 (age 49)
- Place of birth: Kartal, Turkey
- Height: 1.80 m (5 ft 11 in)
- Positions: Attacking midfielder; winger

Youth career
- Kartalspor

Senior career*
Years	Team	Apps	(Gls)
1997–1998	Kartalspor	30	(3)
1998–1999	Çanakkale Dardanelspor	26	(2)
1999–2003	Trabzonspor	116	(9)
2003–2004	A. Sebatspor	50	(8)
2004–2006	Ankaraspor	46	(4)
2006–2008	Konyaspor	59	(8)
2008–2010	Gaziantepspor	65	(5)
2010–2012	Mersin İdmanyurdu	31	(3)
2012–2013	Adana Demirspor	34	(4)

International career^{‡}
2003	Turkey U21	5	(0)
- * Club domestic league appearances and goals as of May 22, 2012 ‡ National team caps and goals as of June 8, 2008

Erman Özgür (born April 13, 1977) is a Turkish former footballer and a current pundit. He used to play as attacking midfielder who can also play as a left winger. Özgür played several years for Trabzonspor before moving to various Anatolian clubs. He is known as a technical player who is equally combative.

== Honours ==
=== Club ===
Trabzonspor

- Turkish Cup: 2002–03
