= Hüseyin Çimşir =

Turkish footballer and coach

Personal information
- Date of birth: 26 May 1979 (age 47)
- Place of birth: Araklı, Turkey
- Height: 1.87 m (6 ft 2 in)
- Position: Midfielder

Youth career
- Trabzonspor

Senior career*
Years	Team	Apps	(Gls)
1997–2000	Trabzonspor	35	(0)
1998–1999	→ Sakaryaspor (loan)	28	(3)
2000–2002	Antalyaspor	53	(2)
2002–2009	Trabzonspor	218	(8)
2009–2011	Bursaspor	46	(1)
2012–2013	Adana Demirspor	27	(0)
Total		407	(14)

International career
1998–2007	Turkey	34	(0)

Managerial career
- 2013–2014: Trabzon Akçaabat (youth)
- 2014: Akhisar Belediyespor (assistant)
- 2015–2017: Osmanlıspor (assistant)
- 2017: Konyaspor (assistant)
- 2018–2019: Trabzonspor (assistant)
- 2020: Trabzonspor
- 2020: BB Erzurumspor
- 2026: Trabzonspor (interim)
- * Club domestic league appearances and goals

Hüseyin Çimşir (born 26 May 1979) is a Turkish football coach and former player.

== Playing career ==
Çimşir spent most of his playing career at Trabzonspor, where he captained the side from 2006 to 2009. At Trabzonspor, he helped the team to success in the Turkish Cup on two occasions, in 2003 and in 2004. He also had short spells at Sakaryaspor, Antalyaspor, Bursaspor, and Adana Demirspor. He transferred to Bursaspor ahead of the 2009–10 season and won the league title with the club that campaign as Bursaspor became the first club outside Istanbul to win the Süper Lig in 26 years.

He was a Turkey international and won 34 caps for the Turkey national team.

His strengths were in his defensive capabilities. He usually would play in the anchor position, covering the defence and attempting to move the ball onto the midfield. He would rarely venture forward, preferring instead to organise and protect the back line.

== Coaching career ==
Çimşir previously served as manager of Trabzonspor. In December 2020, he was appointed as manager of BB Erzurumspor.

== Honours ==
Trabzonspor

- Turkish Cup: 2002–03, 2003–04

Bursaspor

- Süper Lig: 2009–10
