= Metin Aktaş =

Turkish footballer (born 1977)

Personal information
- Full name: Metin Aktaş
- Date of birth: August 1, 1977 (age 49)
- Place of birth: Akçaabat, Trabzon, Turkey
- Height: 1.86 m (6 ft 1 in)
- Position: Goalkeeper

Youth career
- 1987–1993: Akçaabat Sebatspor
- 1993–1996: Trabzonspor

Senior career*
Years	Team	Apps	(Gls)
1996–2003	Trabzonspor	95	(0)
2003–2004	Akçaabat Sebatspor	31	(0)
2004–2006	Kayserispor	29	(0)
2006–2007	Diyarbakırspor	29	(0)
2007–2008	Çaykur Rizespor	1	(0)
2008–2009	Giresunspor	39	(0)
2009	Akçaabat Sebatspor	14	(0)
2010	Diyarbakırspor	4	(0)
2010–2011	Şanlıurfaspor	13	(0)
2011–2012	Adana Demirspor	17	(0)

International career
1994	Turkey U17	5	(0)
1995	Turkey U18	4	(0)
1997–2000	Turkey U21	19	(0)
2004	Turkey A2	2	(0)
2000–2002	Turkey	3	(0)
- * Club domestic league appearances and goals as of 18:19, 19 January 2013 (UTC)

Metin Aktaş (born 1 August 1977) is a Turkish footballer who last played as a goalkeeper for Adana Demirspor in 2012. Aktaş was a member of the Turkey squad at the 2000 UEFA European Under-21 Football Championship.

== Honours ==
=== Club ===
Trabzonspor

- Turkish Cup: 2002–03
