= Hami Mandıralı =

Turkish footballer and manager

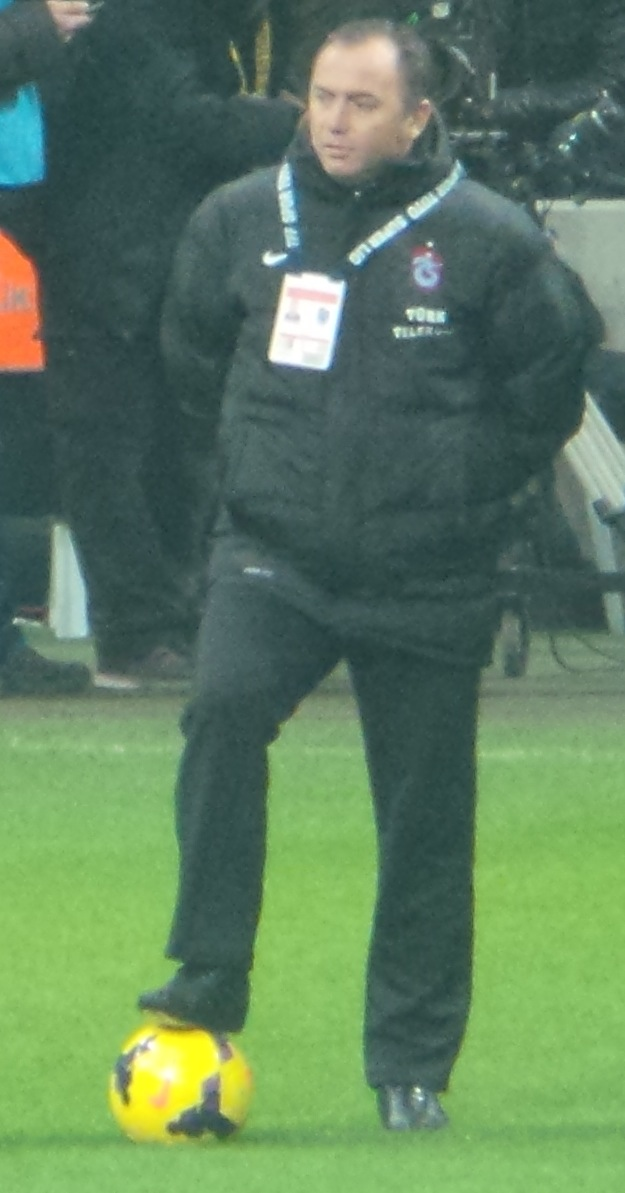

Personal information
- Date of birth: 20 July 1968 (age 58)
- Place of birth: Arsin, Turkey
- Height: 1.78 m (5 ft 10 in)
- Positions: Attacking midfielder; second striker

Youth career
- 1978–1985: Trabzonspor

Senior career*
Years	Team	Apps	(Gls)
1985–1998	Trabzonspor	334	(180)
1998–1999	Schalke 04	22	(3)
1999–2002	Trabzonspor	82	(38)
2002	Ankaragücü	8	(1)
Total		446	(222)

International career
1984	Turkey U16	4	(0)
1985–1986	Turkey U18	17	(1)
1987–1989	Turkey U21	7	(2)
1987–1988	Turkey U23	4	(0)
1987–1999	Turkey	48	(8)

Managerial career
- 2008–2010: Turkey U21
- 2014: Trabzonspor
- 2014–2015: Antalyaspor
- 2016: Trabzonspor
- * Club domestic league appearances and goals

Hami Mandıralı (born 20 July 1968) is a Turkish football manager and former footballer. He played for Trabzonspor nearly all of his career.

== Club career ==
Mandıralı was born in Arsin, Trabzon, Turkey. joined Trabzonspor aged 10, and continued on to make his professional debut in 1985, aged 17. He quickly established himself as one of the most consistent finishers of his time. He became a regular in the Turkey national team, and was always near the top of the goalscorers charts. Mandıralı proved his reputation was deserved by scoring many goals in European competition. In all, he scored 23 goals in European football.

Mandıralı was particularly famous for his free-kicks, from which he scored many times in his career. He did not try and curl the ball, like most of his more illustrious colleagues in the art of scoring free-kicks. Instead, he would unleash thunderous shots that would fly past or through walls and leave the goalkeeper standing motionless. In this manner his style is similar to Roberto Carlos.

He had an extremely powerful shot, being able to easily surpass 140 km/h. Very hard shots include the free kick against San Marino in 1997 and the halfway goal against 1860 Munich, this one surprisingly powerful (over 173 km/h). He scored many times from long and very long range, even over 40 m.

In 1998, he joined the German club Schalke 04 for DM7 million (€3.5 million), but remained there for one year only. He was transferred back to Trabzonspor in the 1999–2000 season for a sum of €2.25 million. Upon his return, he regained his position as top marksman, consistently ending each season as the club's top scorer. In 2002, he was let go by the chairman Özkan Sümer. There was a good deal of bad feeling about his departure, and it is not widely known what caused the split. Mandıralı moved to Ankaragücü, but did not stay long. He retired soon after, having never won the league championship.

=== International goals ===
#	Date	Venue	Opponent	Minute	Result	Competition
1	15 July 1991	Gundadalur,	Faroe Islands	75'	1–1	International Friendly
2	25 March 1992	Luxembourg,	Luxembourg	15'	2–3	International Friendly
3	25 March 1992	Luxembourg,	Luxembourg	66'	2–3	International Friendly
4	8 April 1992	Ankara,	Denmark	33'	2–1	International Friendly
5	26 August 1992	Trabzon,	Bulgaria	68'	3–2	International Friendly
6	28 October 1992	Ankara,	San Marino	90'	4–1	1994 FIFA World Cup qualification (UEFA)
7	30 August 1995	Istanbul,	Macedonia	48'	2–1	International Friendly
8	10 September 1997	Serravalle (San Marino),	San Marino	79'	0–5	1998 FIFA World Cup qualification (UEFA)

== Managing career ==
On 1 July 2008, Mandıralı was appointed on a two-years contract manager of the Turkey under-21 side.

=== Statistics ===
As of 15 March 2016

Team	From	To	Record				
Team	From	To	G	W	D	L	Win %
Trabzonspor	2014	2014	16	6	6	4	37.50
Antalyaspor	2014	2015	12	5	3	4	41.67
Trabzonspor	2016	2016	17	5	1	11	29.41
Total			45	16	10	19	35.56

== Achievements ==
Some of his achievements include:

- World rank (1988–2008): 206th by 222 goals in 499 matches in Turkey and Germany,
- Third most goals scored in Turkish league history (219),
- Most goals scored in European cups (23 at Trabzonspor),
- 8 goals in 40 games for the Turkey national football team.
- Played 558 games for Trabzonspor, the most by any player.

== Honours ==
=== Club ===
Trabzonspor

- Turkish Cup: 1991–92, 1994–95
- Turkish Super Cup: 1995
