= Antalya Atatürk Stadium =

Multi-purpose stadium in Antalya, Turkey

Coordinates: 36°52′42.12″N 30°42′28.41″E

Antalya Atatürk Stadyumu
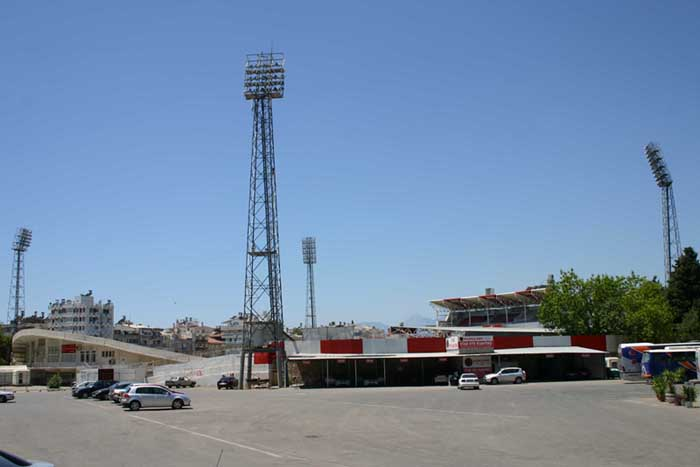
- Interactive map of Antalya Atatürk Stadyumu
- Former names: Antalya Şehir Stadı
- Location: Antalya, Turkey
- Owner: Antalyaspor
- Operator: Antalyaspor
- Capacity: 12,453
- Surface: Grass

Construction
- Groundbreaking: 1964
- Opened: 1965
- Renovated: 2007
- Closed: 2010
- Demolished: 2016
- Cost: Unknown

Tenant
- Antalyaspor

Antalya Atatürk Stadium (Turkish: Antalya Atatürk Stadyumu) was a multi-purpose stadium in Antalya, Turkey. It was used mostly for football matches and hosted the home games of Antalyaspor. The stadium held 12,453.

Following the completiton of the new Antalya Stadium in 2015, Atatürk Stadium is demolished in following year and included to neighboring Karaalioğlu Park.

== Gallery ==
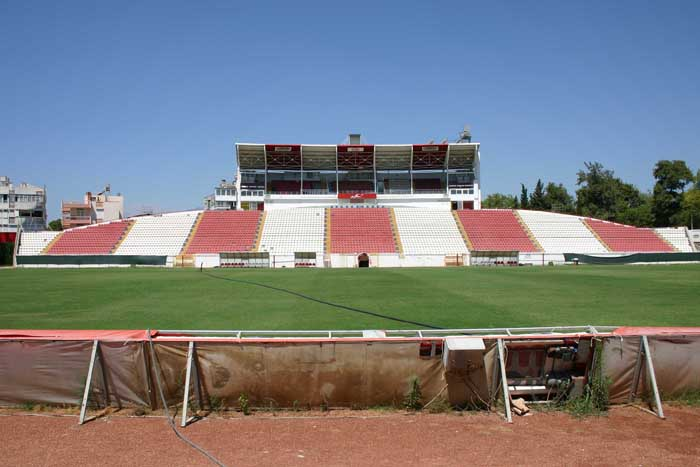

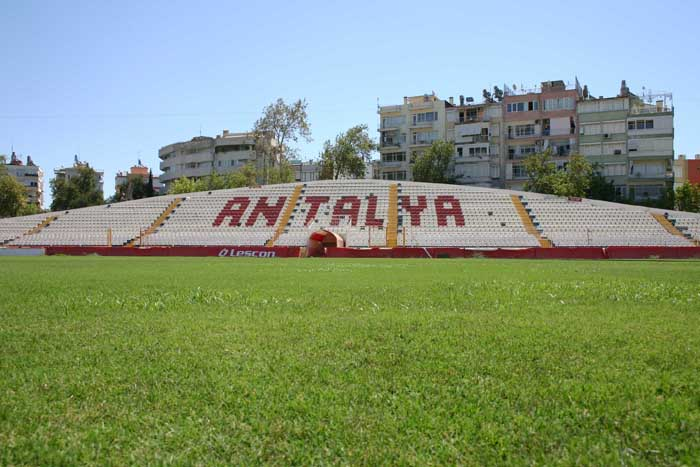
