= Orhan Çıkırıkçı =

Turkish footballer

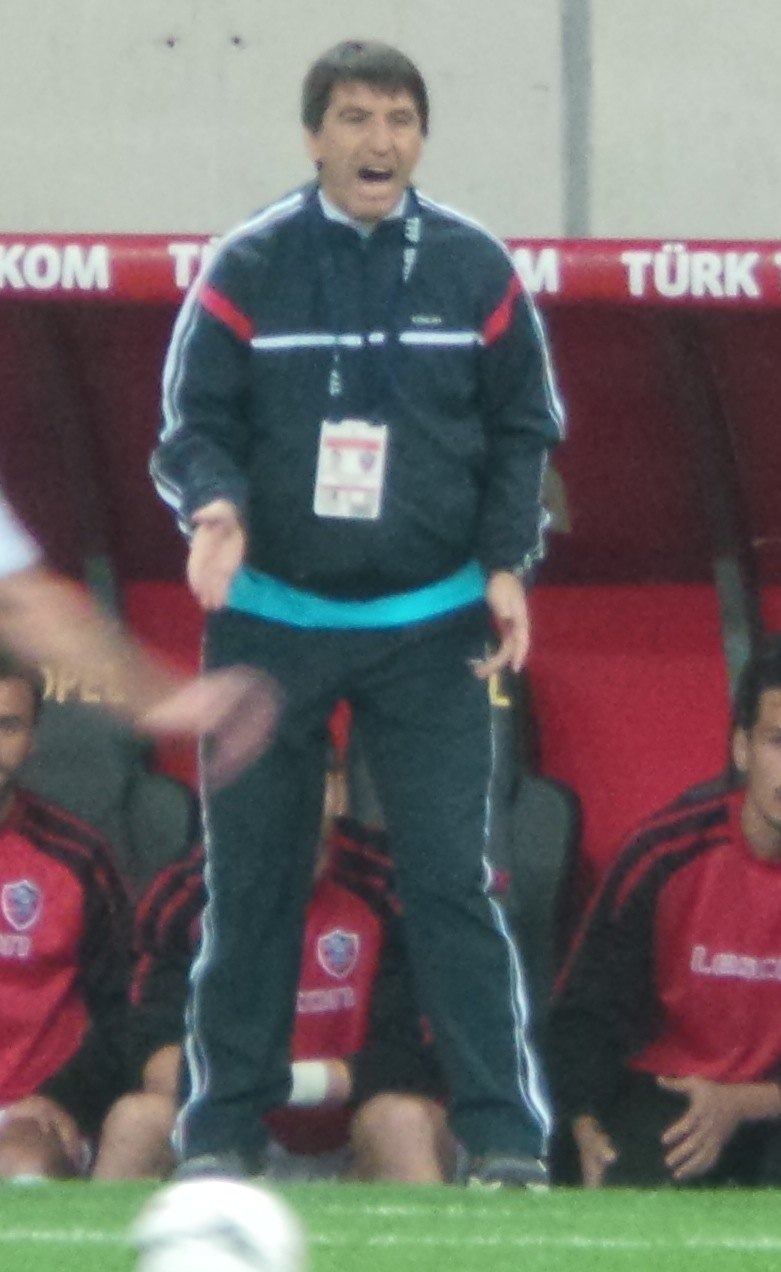

Personal information
- Date of birth: 15 April 1967 (age 59)
- Place of birth: Kırklareli, Turkey
- Height: 1.80 m (5 ft 11 in)
- Position: Winger

Senior career*
Years	Team	Apps	(Gls)
- Çorluspor
- Eskişehirspor
1989–2002	Trabzonspor	317	(57)
2001–2002	→ A. Sebatspor (loan)	21	(3)

International career
1991–1996	Turkey	29	(2)
- * Club domestic league appearances and goals

Orhan Çıkırıkçı (born 15 April 1967) is a Turkish former professional footballer who played as a winger for Çorluspor, Eskişehirspor, Trabzonspor (1989–1999) and Akçaabat Sebatspor. He made 29 appearances for the Turkey national team and was a participant at the 1996 UEFA European Championship.

== Honours ==
Trabzonspor

- Turkish Cup: 1991–92
