= 1990–91 Galatasaray S.K. season =

Galatasaray
1990–91 season
- President: (Turkey) Alp Yalman
- Manager: (Turkey) Mustafa Denizli
- Stadium: Ali Sami Yen Stadı
- Süper Lig: 2nd
- Türkiye Kupası: Winner
- Süper Kupa: Winner
- Top goalscorer: League: Tanju Çolak (31); All: Tanju Çolak (33)
- Highest home attendance: 25,586 vs MKE Ankaragücü (1. Lig, 17 February 1991)
- Lowest home attendance: 7,767 vs Aydınspor 1923 (1. Lig, 19 May 1991)
- Average home league attendance: 16,730
Home colours	Away colours	Third colours

The 1990–91 season was Galatasaray's 87th in existence and the 33rd consecutive season in the 1. Lig. This article shows statistics of the club's players in the season, and also lists all matches that the club have played in the season.

== Squad statistics ==
No.	Pos.	Name	1. Lig		Türkiye Kupası		Süper Kupa		Total	
No.	Pos.	Name	Apps	Goals	Apps	Goals	Apps	Goals	Apps	Goals
1	GK	(Turkey) Hayrettin Demirbaş	29	0	4	0	1	0	34	0
-	GK	(Turkey) Nezih Boloğlu	1	0	0	0	0	0	1	0
2	DF	(Turkey) Cüneyt Tanman (C)	24	0	4	0	1	0	29	0
-	DF	(Turkey) İsmail Demiriz	22	2	3	0	0	0	25	2
-	DF	(Turkey) Serhat Güller	0	0	0	0	0	0	0	0
3	DF	(Turkey) Bülent Korkmaz	30	1	4	0	1	0	35	1
4	DF	(Turkey) Yusuf Altıntaş	23	0	3	1	1	0	27	1
-	DF	(Turkey) Taner Alpak	5	0	0	0	0	0	5	0
-	DF	(Turkey) Erhan Önal	11	0	1	0	0	0	12	0
-	MF	(Turkey) Tayfun Hut	18	0	1	0	0	0	19	0
-	MF	(Turkey) Muhammet Altıntaş	28	4	4	0	1	0	33	4
8	MF	(Turkey) Tugay Kerimoğlu	13	0	2	1	1	0	16	1
-	MF	(Turkey) Mustafa Yücedağ	16	3	1	0	0	0	17	3
-	MF	(Turkey) Savaş Demiral	3	0	0	0	0	0	3	0
-	MF	(Turkey) Metin Yıldız	17	1	3	0	1	0	21	1
-	MF	(Turkey) Ceylan Arıkan	0	0	0	0	0	0	0	0
-	MF	(Turkey) Talat Alptekin	0	0	0	0	0	0	0	0
-	MF	(Turkey) Zekir Keskin	0	0	0	0	0	0	0	0
6	MF	(Socialist Federal Republic of Yugoslavia) Xhevat Prekazi	24	3	4	1	1	0	29	4
-	FW	(Turkey) Yücel Çolak	0	0	0	0	0	0	0	0
-	FW	(Turkey) Bülent Alkılıç	1	0	0	0	0	0	1	0
11	FW	(Turkey) Erdal Keser	22	4	4	1	0	0	26	5
-	FW	(Turkey) Hasan Vezir	22	5	1	0	0	0	23	5
9	FW	(Turkey) Tanju Çolak	29	31	4	2	1	0	34	33
10	FW	(Poland) Roman Kosecki	14	4	3	0	1	1	18	5
7	FW	(Turkey) Uğur Tütüneker	20	3	3	2	1	0	24	5
5	MF	(Romania) Iosif Rotariu	15	1	2	0	1	0	18	1

=== Players in / out ===
==== In ====
Pos.	Nat.	Name	Age	Moving from
MF	(Romania)	Iosif Rotariu	28	FC Steaua București
MF	(Turkey)	Mustafa Yücedağ	24	Sarıyer G.K.
GK	(Turkey)	Nezih Ali Boloğlu	26	Gençlerbirliği SK
MF	(Turkey)	Tayfun Hut	23	Muğlaspor
MF	(Turkey)	Taner Alpak	23	Fatih Karagümrük SK
MF	(Turkey)	Talat Alptekin		AFC Ajax
MF	(Turkey)	Ceylan Arikan	19	Feyenoord
FW	(Turkey)	Yücel Çolak	22	Sakaryaspor
MF	(Turkey)	Zekir Keskin	22	Galatasaray A2
DF	(Turkey)	Mert Korkmaz	20	Galatasaray A2
FW	(Poland)	Roman Kosecki	24	Legia Warsaw

==== Out ====
Pos.	Nat.	Name	Age	Moving to
GK	(Socialist Federal Republic of Yugoslavia)	Zoran Simović	36	career end
DF	(Turkey)	Semih Yuvakuran	27	Fenerbahçe SK
MF	(Turkey)	Savaş Koç	27	Gaziantepspor
DF	(Turkey)	Serhat Güller	22	MKE Ankaragücü
FW	(Turkey)	İlyas Tüfekçi	30	Zeytinburnuspor
FW	(Turkey)	Bülent Alkılıç (on loan)	28	Zeytinburnuspor
MF	(Turkey)	Savaş Demiral	29	Konyaspor

== 1. Lig ==
=== Standings ===
Pos	Team	Pld	W	D	L	GF	GA	GD	Pts	Qualification or relegation
1	Beşiktaş (C)	30	20	9	1	63	24	+39	69	Qualification to European Cup first round
2	Galatasaray	30	19	7	4	63	31	+32	64	Qualification to Cup Winners' Cup first round
3	Trabzonspor	30	14	9	7	55	37	+18	51	Qualification to UEFA Cup first round
4	Sarıyer	30	11	12	7	39	34	+5	45	Invitation to Balkans Cup
5	Fenerbahçe	30	12	8	10	53	53	0	44	

Rules for classification: 1) points; 2) goal difference; 3) number of goals scored.
(C) Champions

=== Matches ===
25 August 1990 1	Galatasaray SK	1–1	Boluspor	Istanbul
15:30 EET	Iosif Rotariu 41'	(Report)	İmdat Kum 55'	Stadium: Ali Sami Yen Stadı; Attendance: 18,063; Referee: Hasan Ceylan

2 September 1990 2	Zeytinburnuspor	0–1	Galatasaray SK	Istanbul
15:30 EET		(Report)	Tanju Çolak 74'	Stadium: Ali Sami Yen Stadı; Attendance: 20,338; Referee: Serdar Çakır

9 September 1990 3	Galatasaray SK	2–1	Konyaspor	Istanbul
15:30 EET	Hasan Vezir 3'; Uğur Tütüneker 66'	(Report)	Salih Eken 52'	Stadium: Ali Sami Yen Stadı; Attendance: 21,004; Referee: Kazım Ünlüsoy

16 September 1990 4	MKE Ankaragücü	0–1	Galatasaray SK	Ankara
15:30 EET		(Report)	Muhammet Altıntaş 24'	Stadium: Ankara 19 Mayıs Stadı; Attendance: 23,227; Referee: Osman Erdal Fırat

22 September 1990 5	Galatasaray SK	5–1	Sarıyer G.K.	Istanbul
15:30 EET	Mustafa Yücedağ 24', 85'; Hasan Vezir 44'; Tanju Çolak 62', 90'	(Report)	Hamdi Çam 87'	Stadium: Ali Sami Yen Stadı; Attendance: 15,029; Referee: İhsan Türe

29 September 1990 6	Trabzonspor	3–0	Galatasaray SK	Trabzon
13:00 EET	Hamdi Aslan 6', 20'; Lemi Çelik 89'	(Report)		Stadium: Hüseyin Avni Aker Stadı; Attendance: 20,000; Referee: Sadık Deda

7 October 1990 7	Galatasaray SK	6–1	Karşıyaka SK	Istanbul
14:00 EET	Xhevat Prekazi 19', 65'; Hasan Vezir 28'; Tanju Çolak 37p', 69'; Muhammet Altıntaş 51'	(Report)	Vedat Uysal 83'	Stadium: Ali Sami Yen Stadı; Attendance: 21,321; Referee: Ahmet Çakar

20 October 1990 8	Bursaspor	0–1	Galatasaray SK	Bursa
14:00 EET		(Report)	Tanju Çolak 61'	Stadium: Bursa Atatürk Stadı; Referee: Oğuz Sarvan

27 October 1990 9	Galatasaray SK	2–1	Bakırköy SK	Istanbul
14:00 EET	Uğur Tütüneker 8'; Tanju Çolak 54'	(Report)	Jarosław Araszkiewicz 25'	Stadium: Ali Sami Yen Stadı; Attendance: 11,608; Referee: Argun Darıcı

4 November 1990 10	Adanaspor	2–2	Galatasaray SK	Adana
13:00 EET	Rostislav Jeřábek 1'; Orhan Kaynak 36'	(Report)	İsmail Demiriz 12'; Mustafa Yücedağ 86'	Stadium: Adana 5 Ocak Stadı; Referee: Bülent Yavuz

17 November 1990 11	Galatasaray SK	2–0	Gençlerbirliği SK	Istanbul
13:00 EET	Tanju Çolak 2p' Xhevat Prekazi 68'	(Report)		Stadium: Ali Sami Yen Stadı; Attendance: 7,903; Referee: Sadık Deda

24 November 1990 12	Beşiktaş JK	1–1	Galatasaray SK	Istanbul
19:00 EET	Feyyaz Uçar 76'	(Report)	Tanju Çolak 16'	Stadium: İnönü Stadı; Attendance: 24,308; Referee: Yusuf Namoğlu

1 December 1990 13	Fenerbahçe SK	1–2	Galatasaray SK	Istanbul
17:00 EET	Czesław Jakołcewicz 47'	(Report)	Tanju Çolak 6', 76'	Stadium: İnönü Stadı; Attendance: 16,915; Referee: Erman Toroğlu

9 December 1990 14	Galatasaray SK	1–0	Gaziantepspor	Istanbul
13:00 EET	Metin Yıldız 44'	(Report)		Stadium: Ali Sami Yen Stadı; Attendance: 23,325; Referee: Hasan Ceylan

15 December 1990 15	Aydınspor 1923	1–2	Galatasaray SK	Aydın
13:00 EET	Cüneyt Tanman 85og'	(Report)	Erdal Keser 77'; Hasan Vezir 78'	Stadium: Adnan Menderes Stadium; Referee: Oğuz Sarvan

27 January 1991 16	Boluspor	1–0	Galatasaray SK	Bolu
13:00 EET	İsmail Demiriz 57og'	(Report)		Stadium: Bolu Atatürk Stadı; Referee: Hasan Ceylan

9 February 1991 17	Konyaspor	1–1	Galatasaray SK	Konya
13:00 EET	Kayhan Kaynak 65'	(Report)	Uğur Tütüneker 82'	Stadium: Konya Atatürk Stadı; Referee: Kazım Ünlüsoy

17 February 1991 18	Galatasaray SK	0–0	MKE Ankaragücü	Istanbul
13:30 EET		(Report)		Stadium: Ali Sami Yen Stadı; Attendance: 25,586; Referee: Sadık Deda

20 February 1991 19	Galatasaray SK	2–2	Zeytinburnuspor	Istanbul
14:00 EET	Tanju Çolak 12'; İsmail Demiriz 83'	(Report)	Nezihi Tosuncuk 13'; İlyas Tüfekçi 56'	Stadium: Ali Sami Yen Stadı; Attendance: 13,904; Referee: Yüksel Okçuoğlu

24 February 1991 20	Sarıyer G.K.	2–2	Galatasaray SK	Istanbul
13:30 EET	Erdi Demir 37'; Esat Bayram 78'	(Report)	Tanju Çolak 29', 53p'	Stadium: Fenerbahçe Stadı; Attendance: 17,579; Referee: Özcan Oal

2 March 1991 21	Galatasaray SK	3–1	Trabzonspor	Istanbul
14:00 EET	Tanju Çolak 40', 43p', 77'	(Report)	Hamdi Aslan 14'	Stadium: Ali Sami Yen Stadı; Attendance: 19,042; Referee: Sadık Deda

10 March 1991 22	Karşıyaka SK	1–2	Galatasaray SK	İzmir
14:00 EET	Ali Yalçın 61'	(Report)	Muhammet Altıntaş 60'; Tanju Çolak 70'	Stadium: İzmir Atatürk Stadium; Attendance: 41,902; Referee: Metin Tokat

17 March 1991 23	Galatasaray SK	2–1	Bursaspor	Istanbul
14:00 EET	Erdal Keser 57', 70'	(Report)	Ali Nail Durmuş 53'	Stadium: Ali Sami Yen Stadı; Attendance: 21,637; Referee: Yusuf Namoğlu

24 March 1991 24	Bakırköy SK	0–2	Galatasaray SK	Istanbul
14:00 EET		(Report)	Tanju Çolak 21', 52'	Stadium: Fenerbahçe Stadı; Attendance: 23,608; Referee: Serdar Çakır

30 March 1991 25	Galatasaray SK	5–2	Adanaspor	Istanbul
15:00 EET	Bülent Korkmaz 30'; Tanju Çolak 34', 78'; Roman Kosecki 51', 82'	(Report)	Bülent Okyaz 48'; Rostislav Jeřábek 63'	Stadium: Ali Sami Yen Stadı; Attendance: 8,261; Referee: Ülkü Tırpancı

7 April 1991 26	Gençlerbirliği SK	0–3	Galatasaray SK	Ankara
14:30 EET		(Report)	Roman Kosecki 27'; Muhammet Altıntaş 68'; Tanju Çolak 78'	Stadium: Ankara 19 Mayıs Stadı; Attendance: 23,639; Referee: Metin Tokat

20 April 1991 27	Galatasaray SK	2–3	Beşiktaş JK	Istanbul
15:00 EET	Tanju Çolak 5'; Ulvi Güveneroğlu 18og'	(Report)	Ali Gültiken 33', 43'; Feyyaz Uçar 73'	Stadium: Ali Sami Yen Stadı; Attendance: 19,776; Referee: Ahmet Çakar

4 May 1991 28	Galatasaray SK	4–1	Fenerbahçe SK	Istanbul
15:30 EET	Roman Kosecki 42'; Tanju Çolak 53', 74'; Erdal Keser 54'	(Report)	Aykut Kocaman 79p'	Stadium: Ali Sami Yen Stadı; Attendance: 16,717; Referee: Ülkü Tırpancı

12 May 1991 29	Gaziantepspor	1–0	Galatasaray SK	Gaziantep
15:30 EET	Luiz da Silva Maciel 9'	(Report)		Stadium: Kamil Ocak Stadı; Referee: Bülent Yavuz

19 May 1991 30	Galatasaray SK	6–2	Aydınspor 1923	Istanbul
15:30 EET	Tanju Çolak 26p', 37p', 66', 77p', 81'; Hasan Vezir 88'	(Report)	İlker Yağcıoğlu 35'; Faruk Korkmaz 89'	Stadium: Ali Sami Yen Stadı; Attendance: 7,767; Referee: İbrahim Aksoy

== Türkiye Kupası ==
Kick-off listed in local time (EET)

=== 6th round ===
23 December 1990 1	Konyaspor	0–1	Galatasaray SK	Konya
12:00 EET		(Report)	Xhevat Prekazi 85'	Stadium: Atatürk Stadı; Referee: Sadık Deda

=== 1/4 final ===
13 February 1991 1	Beşiktaş JK	2–2	Galatasaray SK	Istanbul
18:30 EET	Metin Tekin 84'; Ali Gültiken 116'	(Report)	Uğur Tütüneker 18'; Yusuf Altıntaş 98'	Stadium: İnönü Stadı; Attendance: 18,735; Referee: İhsan Türe

=== 1/2 final ===
13 March 1991 1	Galatasaray SK	2–1	Trabzonspor	Istanbul
13:00 EET	Erdal Keser 48'; Tanju Çolak 109p'	(Report)	Hami Mandıralı 75p'	Stadium: Ali Sami Yen Stadı; Attendance: 15,394; Referee: Ahmet Çakar

=== Final ===
8 May 1991 1	MKE Ankaragücü	1–3	Galatasaray SK	İzmir
18:00 EET	Cengiz Alp 17'	(Report)	Tanju Çolak 18'; Uğur Tütüneker 106'; Tugay Kerimoğlu 120'	Stadium: İzmir Atatürk Stadium; Attendance: 20,240; Referee: Hasan Ceylan

== Süper Kupa-Cumhurbaşkanlığı Kupası ==
Kick-off listed in local time (EET)

26 May 1991 1	Beşiktaş JK	0–1	Galatasaray SK	Ankara
17:00 EET		(Report)	Roman Kosecki 78'	Stadium: 19 Mayıs Stadı; Attendance: 14,650; Referee: Ahmet Çakar

== Friendly Matches ==
Kick-off listed in local time (EET)

=== TSYD Kupası ===
11 August 1990 1	Fenerbahçe SK	5–2	Galatasaray SK	Istanbul
17:30 EET	Şenol Çorlu 33'; Fadil Vokri 36', 41'; Hakan Tecimer 44'; Şenol Ulusavaş 79'	(Report)	Tanju Çolak 24', 45'	Stadium: Fenerbahçe Stadı; Attendance: 28,134; Referee: Argun Darıcı

12 August 1990 2	Galatasaray SK	3–3	Beşiktaş JK	Istanbul
20:00 EET	Bülent Alkılıç 11'; Erhan Önal 67'; Xhevat Prekazi 77'	(Report)	Metin Tekin 30'; Ali Gültiken 45'; Mehmet Özdilek 69'	Stadium: İnönü Stadı; Attendance: 24,498; Referee: Sabri Çelik

== Attendance ==
Competition	Av. Att.	Total Att.
1. Lig	16,730	250,943
Türkiye Kupası	15,394	15,394
Total	16,646	266,337
