= 1991–92 Galatasaray S.K. season =

Galatasaray
1991–92 season
- President: (Turkey) Alp Yalman
- Manager: (Turkey) Mustafa Denizli
- Stadium: Ali Sami Yen Stadı
- 1. Lig: 3rd
- Türkiye Kupası: 1/4 final
- Cup Winners' Cup: 1/4 final
- Top goalscorer: League: Roman Kosecki (15); All: Roman Kosecki (20)
- Highest home attendance: 31,065 vs Konyaspor (1. Lig, 22 September 1991)
- Lowest home attendance: 2,082 vs Bursaspor (1. Lig, 2 May 1992)
- Average home league attendance: 13,006
Home colours	Away colours

The 1991–92 season was Galatasaray's 88th in existence and the 34th consecutive season in the 1. Lig. This article shows statistics of the club's players in the season, and also lists all matches that the club have played in the season.

== Squad statistics ==
No.	Pos.	Name	1. Lig		Türkiye Kupası		ECW		Total	
No.	Pos.	Name	Apps	Goals	Apps	Goals	Apps	Goals	Apps	Goals
-	GK	(Turkey) Hayrettin Demirbaş	27	0	2	0	6	0	35	0
-	GK	(Turkey) Nezih Boloğlu	4	0	0	0	0	0	4	0
-	DF	(Turkey) İsmail Demiriz	30	1	2	0	5	0	37	1
-	DF	(Turkey) Bülent Korkmaz	27	3	2	0	5	0	34	3
-	DF	(Turkey) Mert Korkmaz	3	0	0	0	0	0	3	0
-	DF	(Turkey) Yusuf Altıntaş	19	3	2	1	4	1	25	5
-	DF	(Turkey) Taner Alpak	10	1	1	0	2	0	13	1
-	DF	(Turkey) Erhan Önal	16	2	1	0	3	0	20	2
-	MF	(Turkey) Tayfun Hut	19	0	0	0	5	0	24	0
-	MF	(Turkey) Okan Buruk	1	2	0	0	0	0	1	2
-	MF	(Turkey) Hamza Hamzaoğlu	26	2	2	0	3	0	31	2
-	MF	(Turkey) Muhammet Altıntaş	27	0	2	0	6	0	35	0
-	MF	(Turkey) Tugay Kerimoğlu	26	3	2	0	5	0	33	3
-	MF	(Turkey) Mustafa Yücedağ	25	1	2	0	4	1	31	2
-	MF	(Turkey) Metin Yıldız	1	0	0	0	3	0	1	0
-	MF	(Socialist Federal Republic of Yugoslavia) Xhevat Prekazi	4	0	0	0	3	0	7	0
-	FW	(Turkey) Erdal Keser (C)	11	5	0	0	2	1	13	6
-	FW	(Turkey) Selçuk Yula	4	1	0	0	1	0	5	1
-	FW	(Turkey) Arif Erdem	27	4	2	0	6	1	35	5
-	FW	(Poland) Roman Kosecki	24	15	2	1	6	4	32	20
-	FW	(Turkey) Uğur Tütüneker	19	5	1	0	1	0	21	5
-	FW	(Turkey) Şevket Candar	18	3	0	0	1	0	19	3
-	FW	(Turkey) Tolga Eriş	1	0	0	0	0	0	1	0
-	FW	(Romania) Iosif Rotariu	12	3	2	1	4	0	18	4
-	FW	(Nigeria) Dominic Iorfa	8	0	1	0	0	0	9	0

=== Players in / out ===
==== In ====
Pos.	Nat.	Name	Age	Moving from
FW	(Turkey)	Arif Erdem	19	Zeytinburnuspor
MF	(Turkey)	Hamza Hamzaoğlu	21	İzmirspor
FW	(Turkey)	Şevket Candar	25	
FW	(Turkey)	Selçuk Yula	32	Sarıyer G.K.
MF	(Turkey)	Okan Buruk	18	Galatasaray A2
FW	(Turkey)	Tolga Eriş	19	Galatasaray A2
FW	(Nigeria)	Dominic Iorfa	23	Queens Park Rangers F.C.

==== Out ====
Pos.	Nat.	Name	Age	Moving to
DF	(Turkey)	Cüneyt Tanman	35	career end
FW	(Turkey)	Tanju Çolak	28	Fenerbahçe SK
FW	(Turkey)	Hasan Vezir	29	Bakırköyspor
FW	(Turkey)	Yücel Çolak	23	Mersin İdman Yurdu
MF	(Turkey)	Ceylan Arıkan		Kuşadasıspor
FW	(Turkey)	Zekir Keskin	23	
MF	(Turkey)	Talat Alptekin		

== 1. Lig ==
=== Standings ===
Pos	Team	Pld	W	D	L	GF	GA	GD	Pts	Qualification or relegation
1	Beşiktaş (C)	30	23	7	0	58	20	+38	76	Qualification to Champions League first round
2	Fenerbahçe	30	23	2	5	81	35	+46	71	Qualification to UEFA Cup first round
3	Galatasaray	30	19	3	8	54	35	+19	60	Qualification to UEFA Cup first round
4	Trabzonspor	30	16	7	7	56	31	+25	55	Qualification to Cup Winners' Cup first round
5	Aydınspor	30	13	5	12	38	39	−1	44	

Rules for classification: 1) points; 2) goal difference; 3) number of goals scored.
(C) Champions

=== Matches ===
31 August 1991 1	Galatasaray SK	2–0	Sarıyer G.K.	Istanbul
15:30 EET	Erdal Keser 47'; Arif Erdem 50'	(Report)		Stadium: Ali Sami Yen Stadı; Attendance: 6,631; Referee: Yüksel Okçuoğlu

7 September 1991 2	Galatasaray SK	1–0	MKE Ankaragücü	Istanbul
15:30 EET	Roman Kosecki 28'	(Report)		Stadium: Ali Sami Yen Stadı; Attendance: 14,547; Referee: Ünsal Çimen

14 September 1991 3	Gençlerbirliği SK	0–0	Galatasaray SK	Ankara
15:30 EET		(Report)		Stadium: Ankara 19 Mayıs Stadı; Attendance: 16,801; Referee: Sadık Deda

22 September 1991 4	Galatasaray SK	2–1	Konyaspor	Istanbul
15:30 EET	Uğur Tütüneker 63'; Roman Kosecki 83p'	(Report)	Cemal Menteşe 60'	Stadium: Ali Sami Yen Stadı; Attendance: 31,065; Referee: Yusuf Yaylı

28 September 1991 5	Altay SK	0–1	Galatasaray SK	İzmir
18:00 EET		(Report)	Bülent Korkmaz 51'	Stadium: İzmir Atatürk Stadium; Attendance: 13,198; Referee: Metin Tokat

5 October 1991 6	Galatasaray SK	0–2	Fenerbahçe SK	Istanbul
14:00 EET		(Report)	Tanju Çolak 21', 52'	Stadium: Ali Sami Yen Stadı; Attendance: 18,492; Referee: Ahmet Çakar

27 October 1991 7	Galatasaray SK	2–1	Adana Demirspor	Istanbul
14:00 EET	Selçuk Yula 46'; Şevket Candar 80'	(Report)	Ümit Özkalp 77p'	Stadium: Ali Sami Yen Stadı; Attendance: 9,147; Referee: Serdar Çakmak

2 November 1991 8	Gaziantepspor	0–1	Galatasaray SK	Gaziantep
13:00 EET		(Report)	Tugay Kerimoğlu 7'	Stadium: Kamil Ocak Stadı; Referee: Hasan Ceylan

10 November 1991 9	Samsunspor	0–1	Galatasaray SK	Samsun
13:00 EET	Ercan Aslankeser 8'	(Report)	Erhan Önal 53'; Tugay Kerimoğlu 68p'	Stadium: Samsun 19 Mayıs Stadı; Referee: Sadık Deda

17 November 1991 10	Galatasaray SK	1–1	Trabzonspor	Istanbul
18:00 EET	Uğur Tütüneker 33'	(Report)	Ogün Temizkanoğlu 79'	Stadium: Ali Sami Yen Stadı; Attendance: 19,932; Referee: Hasan Ceylan

24 November 1991 11	Aydınspor 1923	1–1	Galatasaray SK	Aydın
13:00 EET	Djamel Amani 65'	(Report)	Uğur Tütüneker 17'	Stadium: Adnan Menderes Stadium; Referee: Erman Toroğlu

1 December 1991 12	Galatasaray SK	2–1	Boluspor	Istanbul
13:00 EET	Taner Alpak 21'; Roman Kosecki 50'	(Report)	Cüneyt Karakuş 85p'	Stadium: Ali Sami Yen Stadı; Attendance: 9,579; Referee: Tahsin Kesiciler

7 December 1991 13	Bursaspor	0–4	Galatasaray SK	Bursa
13:00 EET		(Report)	Arif Erdem 3'; Roman Kosecki 58'; Şevket Candar 68'; Hamza Hamzaoğlu 85'	Stadium: Bursa Atatürk Stadı; Referee: Sadık Deda

14 December 1991 14	Galatasaray SK	0–1	Beşiktaş JK	Istanbul
13:00 EET		(Report)	Turan Uzun 44'	Stadium: Ali Sami Yen Stadı; Attendance: 13,950; Referee: Erman Toroğlu

21 December 1991 15	Galatasaray SK	2–1	Bakırköy SK	Istanbul
13:30 EET	Uğur Tütüneker 27', 68'	(Report)	Jarosław Araszkiewicz 80'	Stadium: Ali Sami Yen Stadı; Attendance: 3,980; Referee: İhsan Türe

8 February 1992 16	Sarıyer G.K.	1–0	Galatasaray SK	Istanbul
13:30 EET	Soner Tolungüç 90'	(Report)		Stadium: İnönü Stadı; Attendance: 3,312; Referee: İhsan Türe

16 February 1992 17	MKE Ankaragücü	0–3	Galatasaray SK	Ankara
13:00 EET		(Report)	Mustafa Yücedağ 20'; Yusuf Altıntaş 70'; Roman Kosecki 85p'	Stadium: Ankara 19 Mayıs Stadı; Attendance: 21,355; Referee: Ülkü Tırpancı

22 February 1992 18	Galatasaray SK	3–1	Gençlerbirliği SK	Istanbul
13:30 EET	Bülent Korkmaz 17'; Roman Kosecki 25p', 89'	(Report)		Stadium: Ali Sami Yen Stadı; Attendance: 4,481; Referee: Sadık Deda

8 March 1992 19	Galatasaray SK	3–1	Altay SK	Istanbul
14:00 EET	Roman Kosecki 37', 50', 88'	(Report)	Tahir Karapınar 61'	Stadium: Ali Sami Yen Stadı; Attendance: 17,306; Referee: Serdar Çakman

22 March 1992 20	Galatasaray SK	3–1	Samsunspor	Istanbul
14:00 EET	Arif Erdem 16', 83'; Roman Kosecki 28'	(Report)	Ertuğrul Sağlam 76'	Stadium: Ali Sami Yen Stadı; Attendance: 15,358; Referee: Oğuz Sarvan

29 March 1992 21	Adana Demirspor	1–2	Galatasaray SK	Adana
14:30 EET	Ümit Özkalp 60p'	(Report)	Tugay Kerimoğlu 67'; Bülent Korkmaz 90'	Stadium: Adana 5 Ocak Stadı; Referee: Hasan Ceylan

1 April 1992 22	Konyaspor	0–2	Galatasaray SK	Konya
14:30 EET		(Report)	Erdal Keser 61'; Iosif Rotariu 86'	Stadium: Konya Atatürk Stadı; Referee: Bülent Yavuz

5 April 1992 23	Galatasaray SK	0–1	Gaziantepspor	Istanbul
15:00 EET		(Report)	Marcello Monteiro 89'	Stadium: Ali Sami Yen Stadı; Referee: Serdar Çakman

12 April 1992 24	Trabzonspor	2–3	Galatasaray SK	Ankara
14:30 EET	Jacek Cyzio 40'; Hami Mandıralı 60'	(Report)	Erhan Önal 29'; Roman Kosecki 53', 79'	Stadium: Ankara 19 Mayıs Stadı; Referee: Sadık Deda

19 April 1992 25	Galatasaray SK	1–3	Aydınspor 1923	Istanbul
15:00 EET	Iosif Rotariu 23'	(Report)	Ercan Kılıç 27'; İlker Yağcıoğlu 54', 58'	Stadium: Ali Sami Yen Stadı; Attendance: 15,528; Referee: Metin Tokat

22 April 1992 26	Fenerbahçe SK	5–2	Galatasaray SK	Istanbul
15:00 EET	Aykut Kocaman 10', 48'; Tanju Çolak 20', 80', 86'	(Report)	Erdal Keser 52', 60'	Stadium: Fenerbahçe Stadı; Attendance: 15,714; Referee: Hasan Ceylan

26 April 1992 27	Boluspor	0–2	Galatasaray SK	Bolu
14:30 EET		(Report)	Erdal Keser 14p' Iosif Rotariu 42'	Stadium: Bolu Atatürk Stadı; Referee: Kazım Ünlüsoy

2 May 1992 28	Galatasaray SK	1–2	Bursaspor	Istanbul
15:30 EET	Yusuf Altıntaş 17'	(Report)	Turan Şen 14'; Ján Gabriel 40p'	Stadium: Ali Sami Yen Stadı; Attendance: 2,082; Referee: Ünsal Çimen

9 May 1992 29	Beşiktaş JK	4–3	Galatasaray SK	Istanbul
15:30 EET	Mehmet Özdilek 28', 82'; Sergen Yalçın 52'; Ali Gültiken 58'	(Report)	Yusuf Altıntaş 25'; İsmail Demiriz 46'; Hamza Hamzaoğlu 55'	Stadium: İnönü Stadı; Attendance: 27,192; Referee: Ahmet Çakar

17 May 1992 30	Bakırköy SK	3–5	Galatasaray SK	Istanbul
15:30 EET	Zafer Tüzün 26', 70p', 76'	(Report)	Roman Kosecki 4', 58'; Okan Buruk 24', 46'; Şevket Candar 60'	Stadium: Ali Sami Yen Stadı; Attendance: 3,661; Referee: Ergül Yücedağ

== Türkiye Kupası ==
Kick-off listed in local time (EET)

=== 6th round ===
2 February 1992 1	Bakırköyspor	2–2	Galatasaray SK	Istanbul
12:00 EET	Piotr Nowak 44'; Zafer Tüzün 72'	(Report)	Iosif Rotariu 1'; Roman Kosecki 40'	Stadium: Fenerbahçe Stadı; Attendance: 6,500; Referee: Serdar Çakır

=== 1/4 final ===
26 February 1992 1	Trabzonspor	2–1	Galatasaray SK	Trabzon
12:00 EET	Hamdi Aslan 92'; Hami Mandıralı 100'	(Report)	Yusuf Altıntaş 111'	Stadium: Hüseyin Avni Aker Stadı; Attendance: 25,000; Referee: Oğuz Sarvan

== European Cup Winners' Cup ==
=== First round ===
18 September 1991 1	Eisenhüttenstädter FC Stahl	1–2	Galatasaray SK	Eisenhüttenstadt
17:15 CET	Frank Bartz 40'	(Report)	Roman Kosecki 45'; Erdal Keser 71'	Stadium: Sportanlagen Waldstraße; Attendance: 3,420; Referee: (Netherlands) Jaap Uilenberg

2 October 1991 2	Galatasaray SK	3–0	Eisenhüttenstädter FC Stahl	Istanbul
14:00 TRT	Roman Kosecki 20'; Arif Erdem 67'; Mustafa Yücedağ 87'	(Report)		Stadium: Ali Sami Yen Stadı; Attendance: 14,528; Referee: (Bulgaria) Luben Spasov

=== Second round ===
23 October 1991 1	Galatasaray SK	0–1	FC Baník Ostrava	Istanbul
19:00 TRT		(Report)	Zbyněk Ollender 68'	Stadium: Inönü Stadı; Attendance: 20,586; Referee: (Portugal) Jose Rosa Dos Santos

6 November 1991 2	FC Baník Ostrava	1–2	Galatasaray SK	Ostrava
15:45 CET	Zbyněk Ollender 31'	(Report)	Yusuf Altıntaş 41'; Roman Kosecki 44p'	Stadium: Bazaly; Attendance: 3,250; Referee: (Romania) Marian Mircea Salomir

=== Quarter-finals ===
4 March 1992 1	SV Werder Bremen	2–1	Galatasaray SK	Bremen
20:15 CET	Stefan Kohn 78'; Marinus Bester 85'	(Report)	Roman Kosecki 33'	Stadium: Weserstadion; Attendance: 30,000; Referee: (Poland) Michal Listkiewicz

18 March 1992 2	Galatasaray SK	0–0	SV Werder Bremen	Istanbul
14:00 TRT		(Report)		Stadium: Ali Sami Yen Stadı; Attendance: 35,000; Referee: (Denmark) Kim Milton Nielsen

== Friendly Matches ==
Kick-off listed in local time (EET)

=== TSYD Kupası ===
14 August 1991 1	Galatasaray SK	3–2	Beşiktaş JK	Istanbul
17:30 EET	Erdal Keser 15', 37'; Yusuf Altıntaş 40'	(Report)	Feyyaz Uçar 24', 64p'	Stadium: Ali Sami Yen Stadı; Attendance: 8,348; Referee: Halil Taner Yalçındağ

18 August 1991 2	Fenerbahçe SK	1–2	Galatasaray SK	Istanbul
17:30 EET	Tanju Çolak 87'	(Report)	Roman Kosecki 53'; Erdal Keser 59'	Stadium: İnönü Stadı; Attendance: 22,215; Referee: Yüksel Okçuoğlu

== Attendance ==
Competition	Av. Att.	Total Att.
1. Lig	13,006	182,078
ECW	20,824	62,471
Total	15,284	244,549
