= List of Galatasaray S.K. footballers (25–99 appearances) =

The following is a list of Galatasaray S.K footballers based in Istanbul, Turkey.

== Key ==
- The list is ordered first by date of debut, and then if necessary in alphabetical order.
- Appearances as a substitute are included.
- Statistics are correct up to and including the match played on 21 November 2026. Where a player left the club permanently after this date, his statistics are updated to his date of leaving.

Positions key
Pre-1960s		1960s–	
GK	Goalkeeper		
FB	Full back	DF	Defender
HB	Half back	MF	Midfielder
FW	Forward		

Nationality
Unless otherwise noted, the nationality of a player is determined by the country/countries which he has played for, or if said person has not played international football, their country of birth.
Position
Playing positions are listed according to the tactical formations that were employed at the time. Thus the change in the names of defensive and midfield positions reflects the tactical evolution that occurred from the 1960s onwards.
Club career
Club career is defined as the first and last calendar years in which the player appeared for the club in any of the competitions listed below.
Total appearances and Total goals
Total appearances and goals comprise those in the Atatürk Cup, Istanbul Football Cup, Istanbul Football League, Istanbul Friday League, Istanbul Shield, Prime Minister's Cup, Süper Lig, Turkish Football Championship, Turkish Cup, Turkish Super Cup, TSYD Cup, European Cup/UEFA Champions League, UEFA Cup/UEFA Europa League, Inter-Cities Fairs Cup, UEFA Cup Winners' Cup, UEFA Super Cup and FIFA Club World Cup. Matches; wartime matches are regarded as unofficial and are excluded, as are matches from the abandoned 1939–40 season.

== Players ==
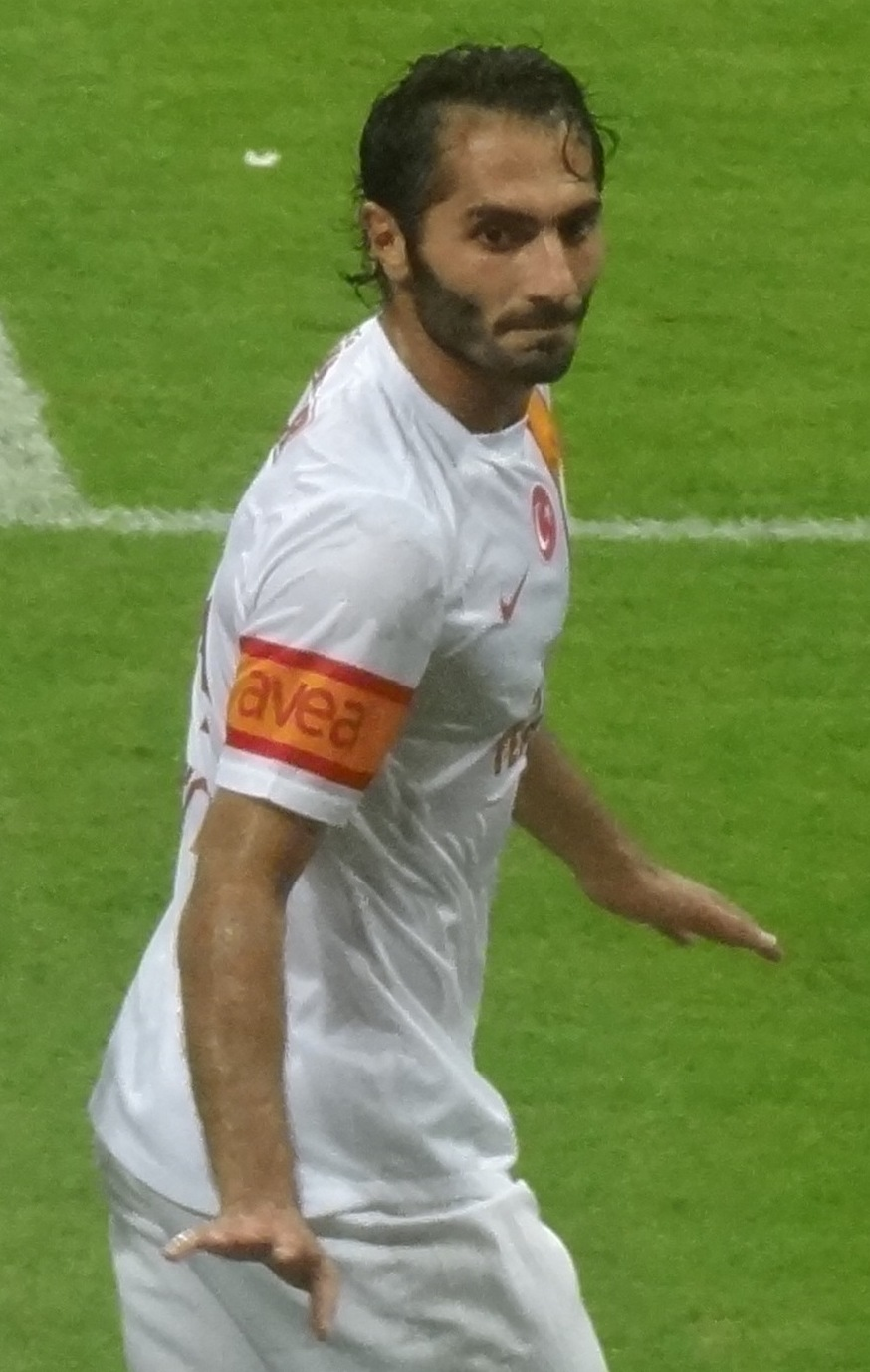
Hamit Altıntop made 89 appearances for the Galatasaray

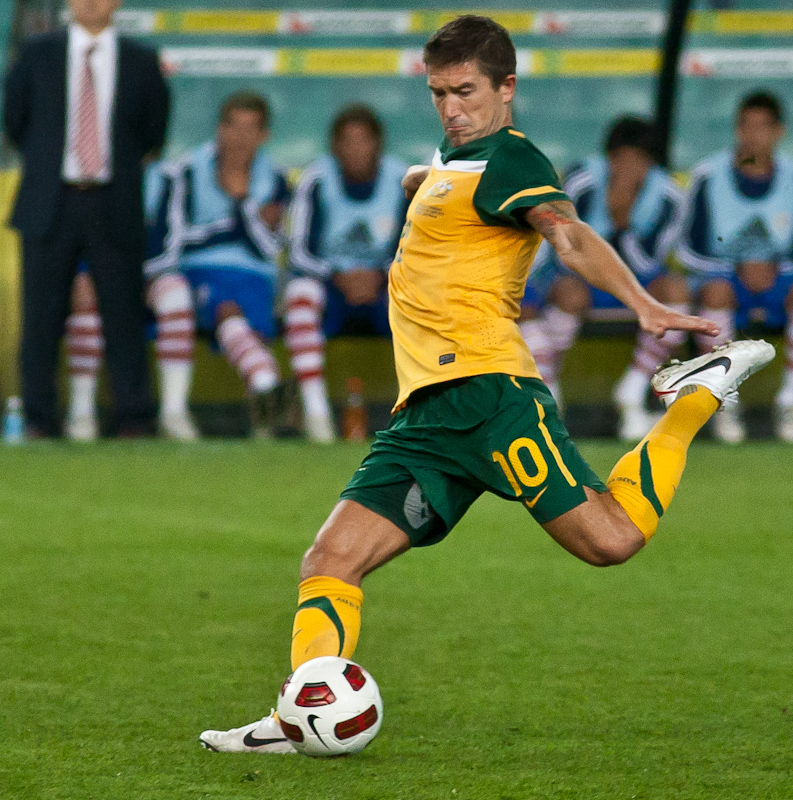
Harry Kewell made 89 appearances for the Galatasaray

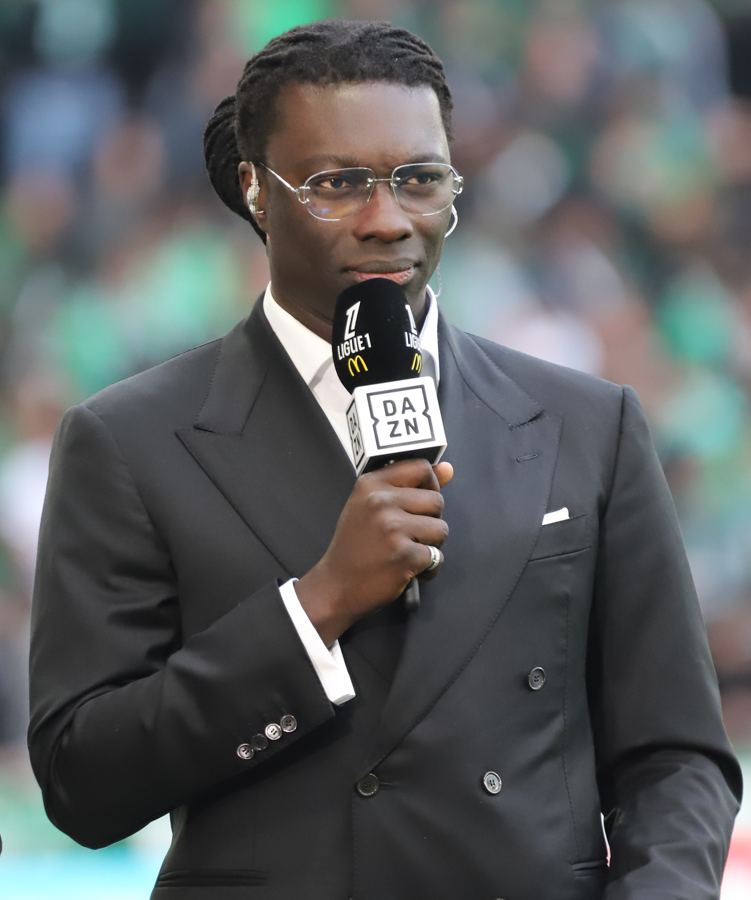
Bafétimbi Gomis made 86 appearances for the Galatasaray

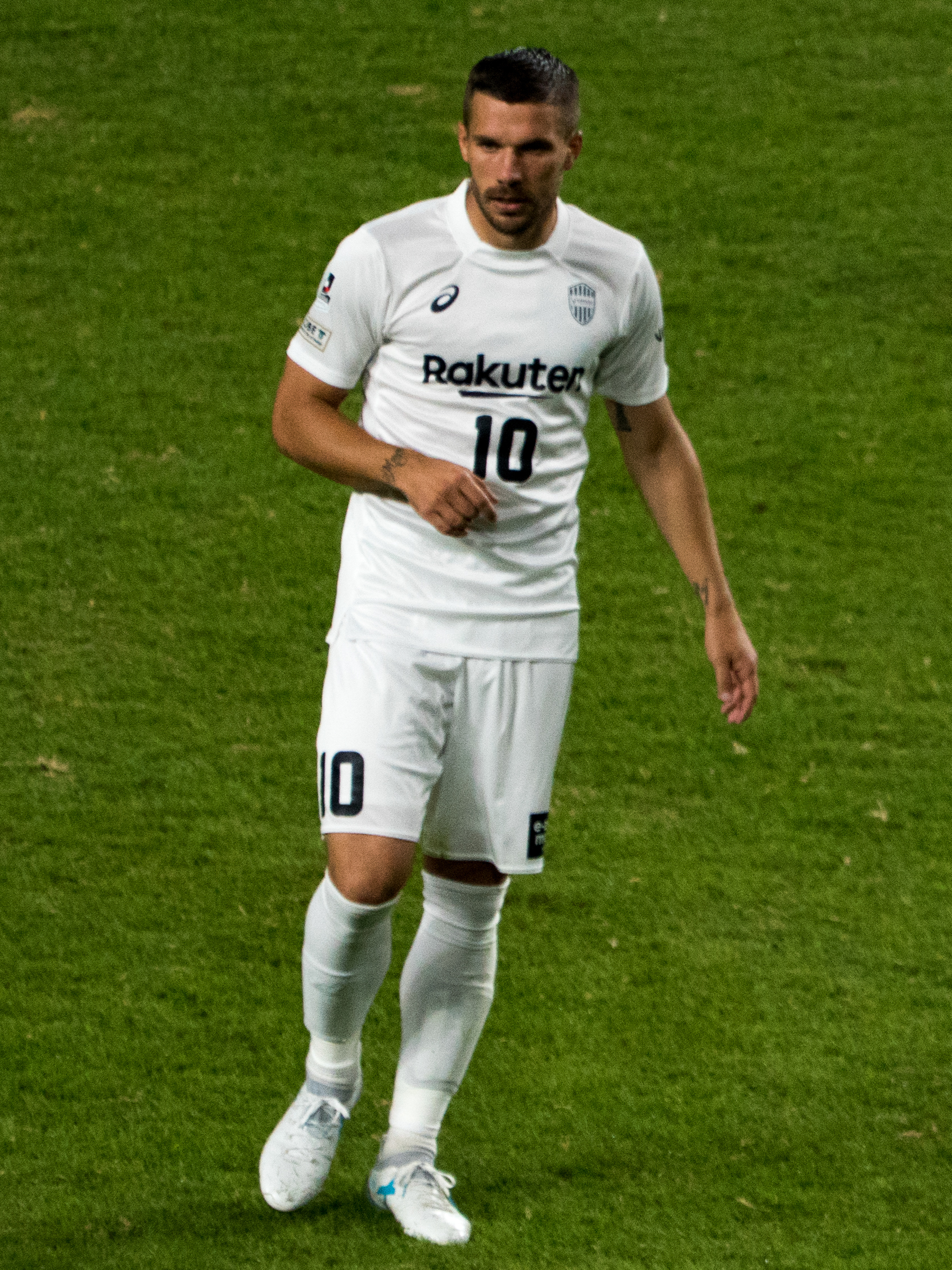
Lukas Podolski made 75 appearances for the Galatasaray

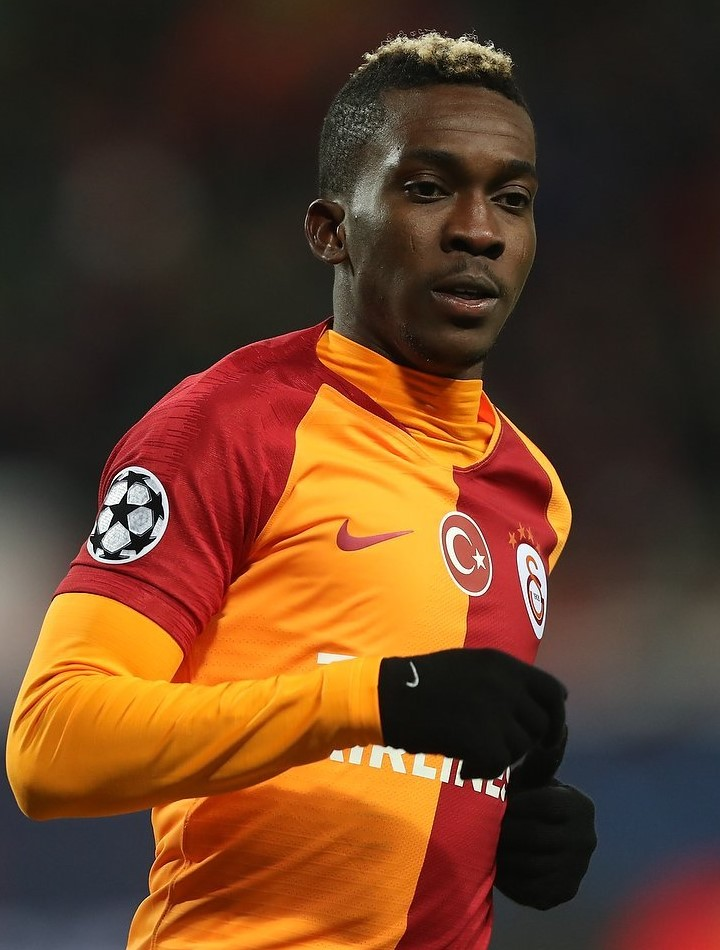
Henry Onyekuru made 71 appearances for the Galatasaray

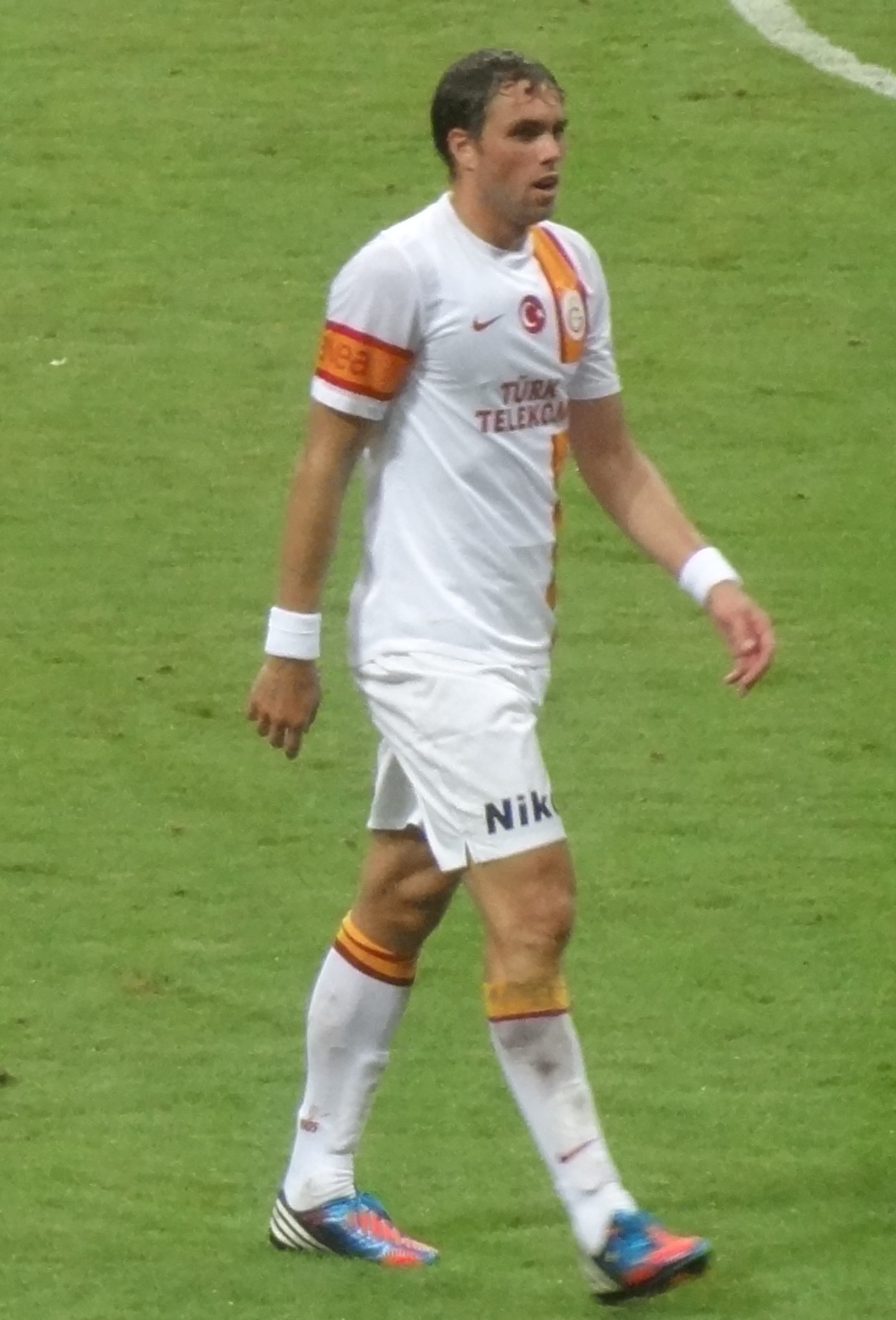
Johan Elmander made 61 appearances for the Galatasaray

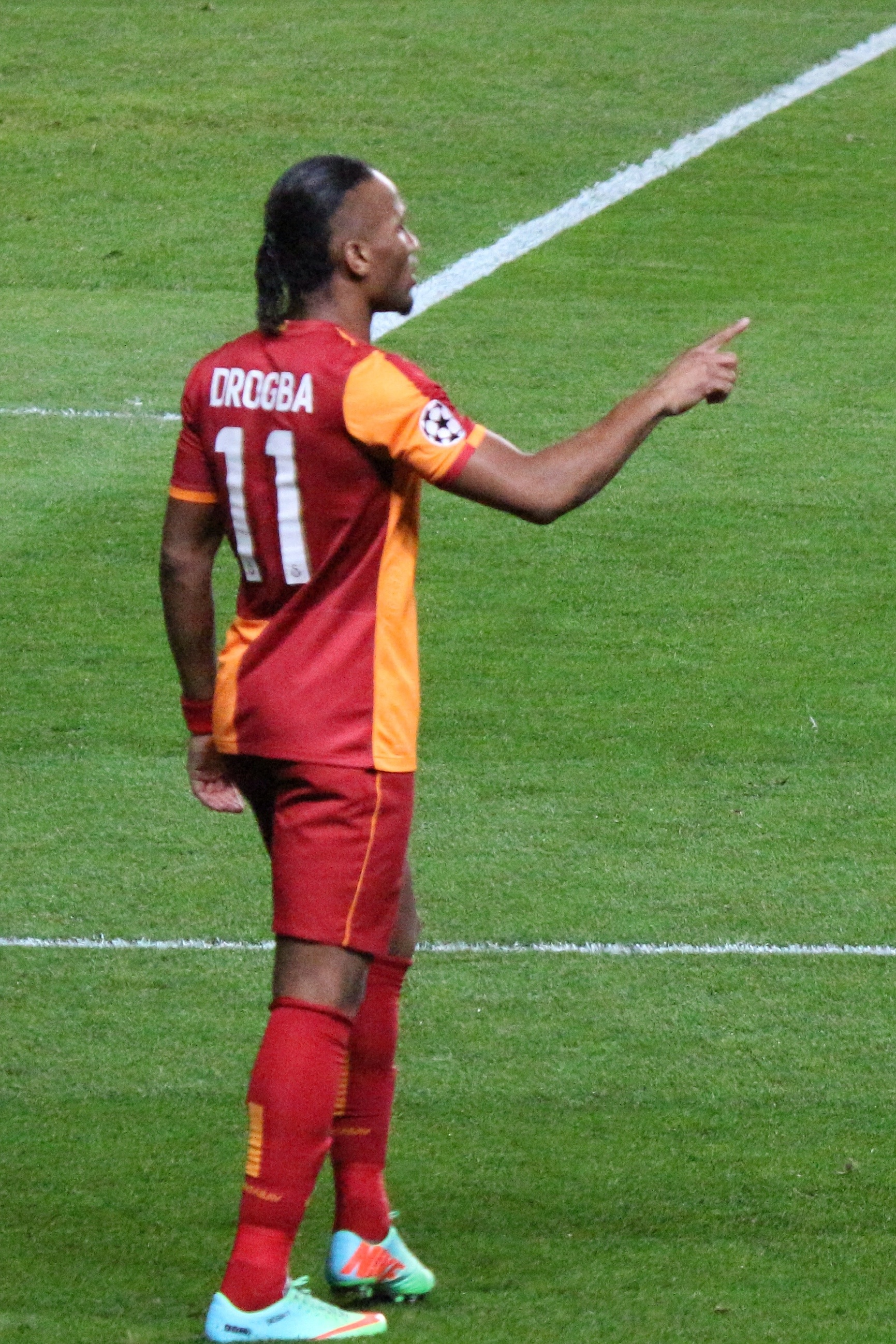
Didier Drogba made 53 appearances for the Galatasaray

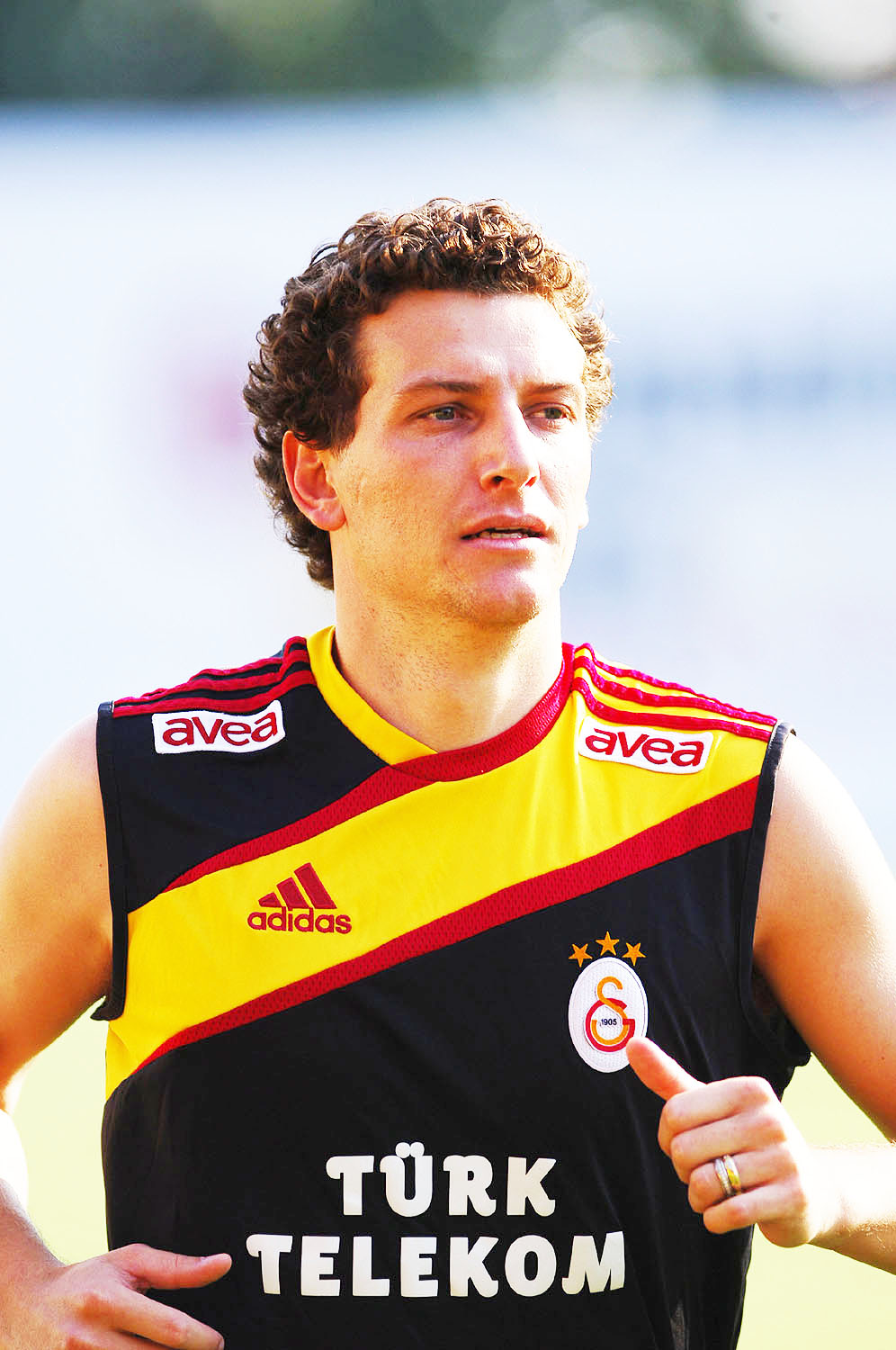
Elano made 47 appearances for the Galatasaray

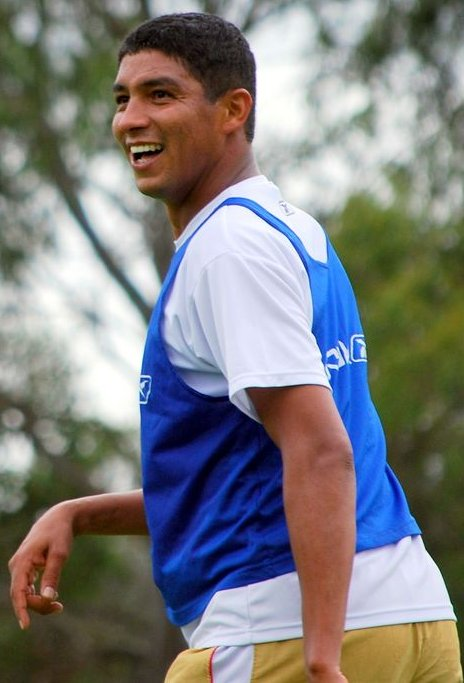
Mário Jardel made 43 appearances for the Galatasaray

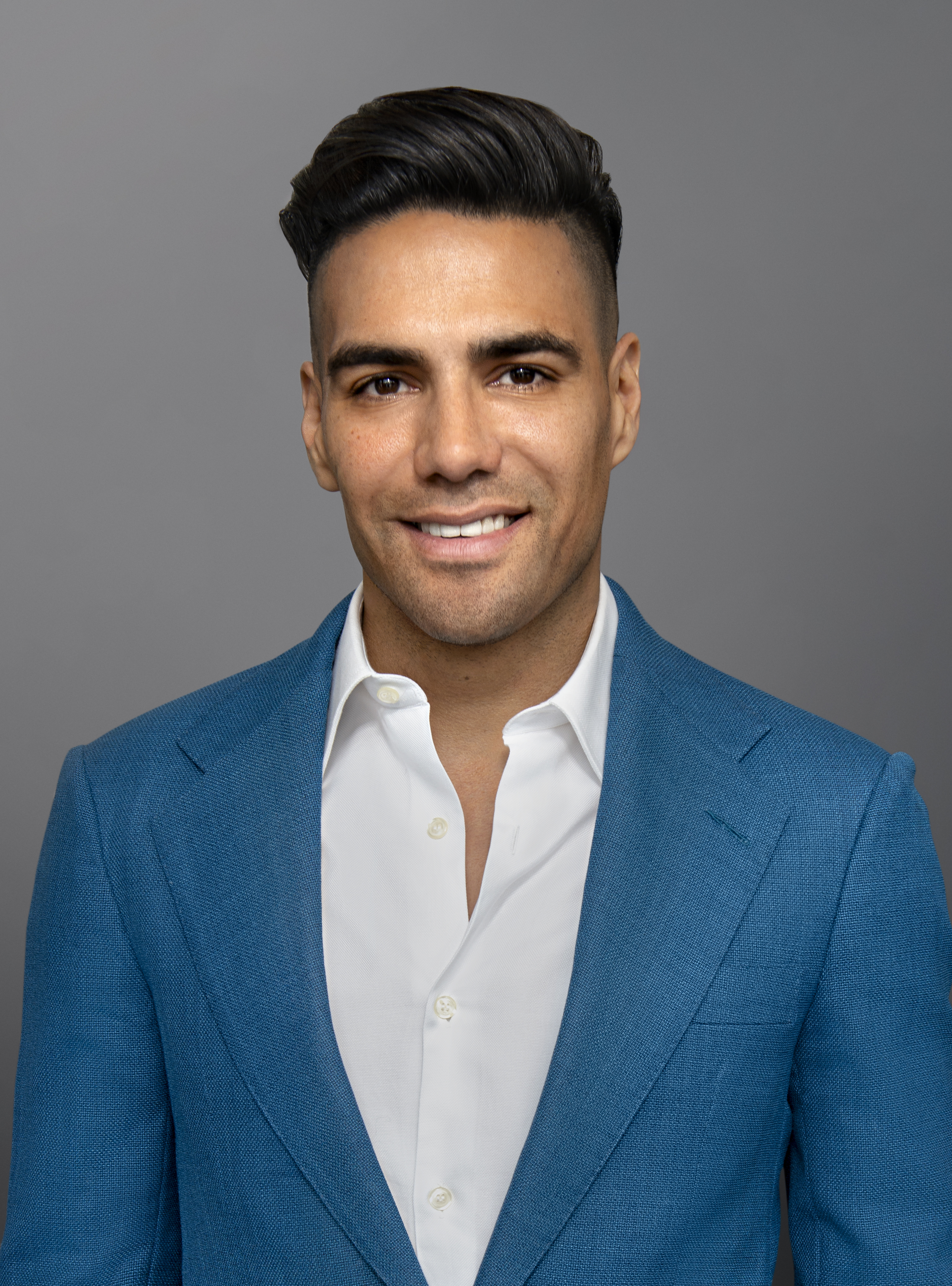
Radamel Falcao made 43 appearances for the Galatasaray

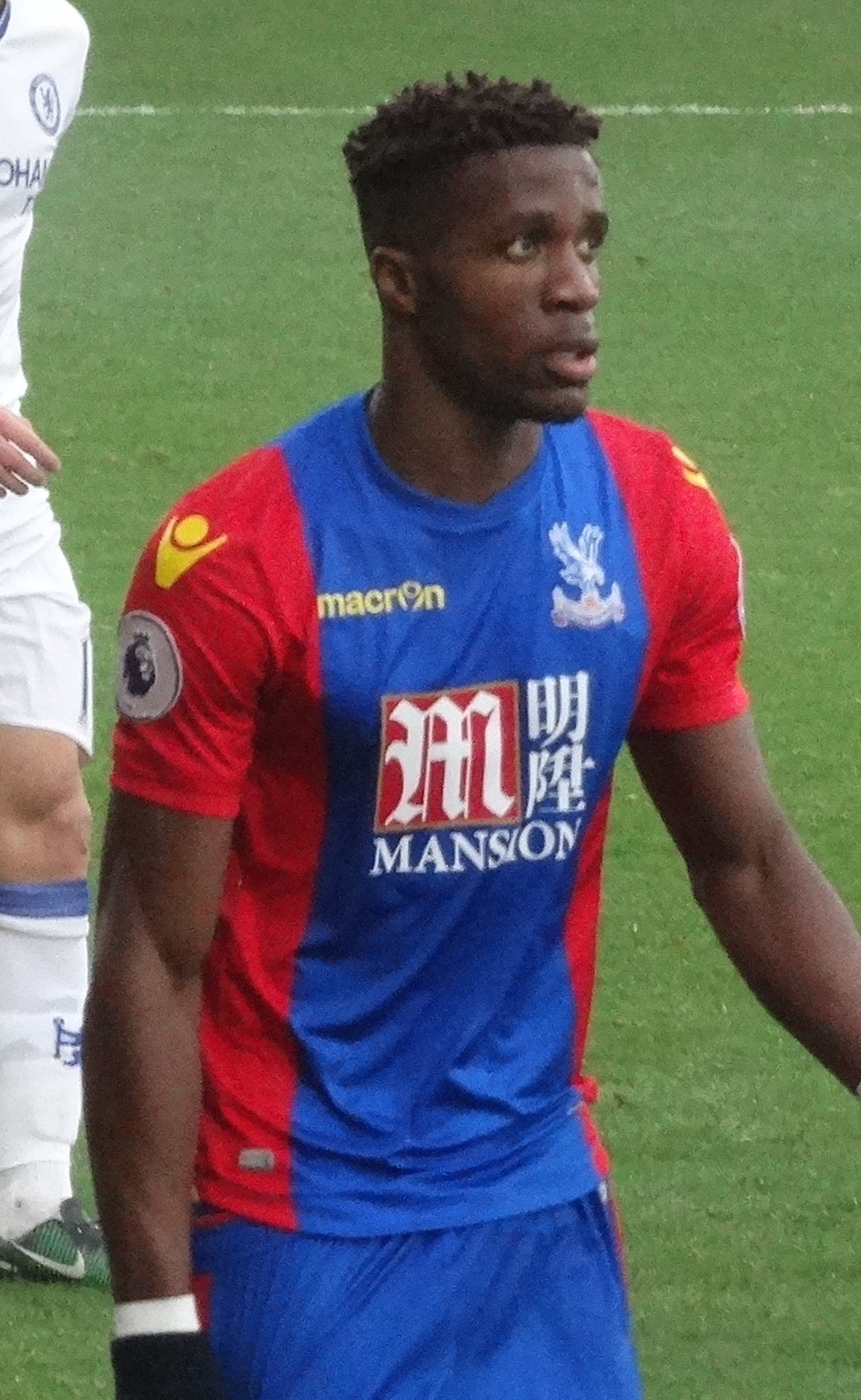
Wilfried Zaha made 43 appearances for the Galatasaray

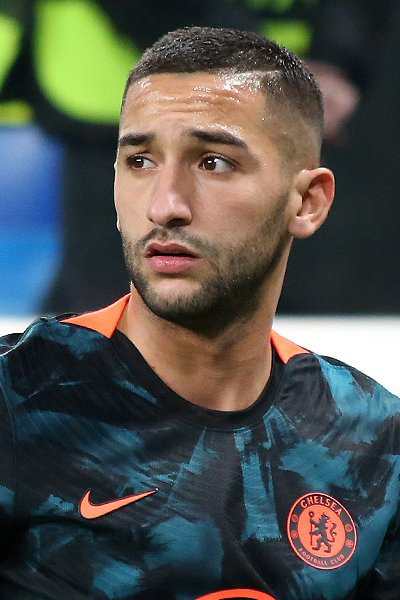
Hakim Ziyech made 34 appearances for the Galatasaray

List of Galatasaray S.K. players with between 25 and 99 appearances
Name	Nationality	Position	Galatasaray career	Starts	Subs	Total	Goals	Ref(s)
Name	Nationality	Position	Galatasaray career	Appearances			Goals	Ref(s)
Mario Lemina	Gabon	MF	2019–2020, 2025–	79	18	97	6	
Naci Özkaya	Turkey	DF	1947–1953	97	0	97	25	
İsmail Kurt	Turkey	DF	1956–1960	96	0	96	0	
Roland Sallai	Hungary	MF	2024–	75	19	94	8	
Yekta Kurtuluş	Turkey	MF	2010–2015	59	34	93	7	
Tarik Hodžić	Yugoslavia	FW	1981–1984	83	10	93	40	
Bülent Ediz	Turkey	FW	1935–1941	93	0	93	52	
Savaş Demiral	Turkey	MF	1987–1992	55	37	92	5	
Harry Kewell	Australia	FW	2008–2011	72	17	89	34	
Hamit Altıntop	Turkey	MF	2012–2017	67	22	89	4	
Bekir Türkgeldi	Turkey	DF	1965–1969	86	3	89	1	
Shabani Nonda	Democratic Republic of the Congo	FW	2007–2010	53	35	88	38	
Feti Okuroğlu	Turkey	DF	1994–1998	67	21	88	2	
Haydar Erdoğan	Turkey	GK	1979–1986	86	2	88	0	
Avni Kurgan	Turkey	GK	1929–1940	88	0	88	0	
Savaş Koç	Turkey	MF	1986–1990	41	46	87	11	
Uğur Uçar	Turkey	DF	2003–2010	61	26	87	1	
Cengiz Yazıcıoğlu	Turkey	MF	1980–1983	66	21	87	0	
Orhan Canpolat	Turkey	FW	1942–1949	87	0	87	15	
Bafétimbi Gomis	France	FW	2017–2018, 2022–2023	57	29	86	51	
Cemil Erlertürk	Turkey	FW	1938–1952	86	0	86	95	
Lütfü Aksoy	Turkey	DF	1933–1940	86	0	86	2	
Victor Osimhen	Nigeria	FW	2024–	77	8	85	69	
Yusuf Tepekule	Turkey	MF	1992–1997	72	13	85	1	
Turgay İnal	Turkey	MF	1977–1981	49	36	85	17	
Tarık Küpoğlu	Turkey	DF	1971–1976	78	7	85	1	
Bruma	Portugal	MF	2013–2017	69	16	85	15	
Olcan Adın	Turkey	MF	2014–2016	54	30	84	9	
Eren Derdiyok	Switzerland	FW	2016–2019	45	39	84	26	
Ali Yavaş	Turkey	DF	1974–1979	78	6	84	1	
Iulian Filipescu	Romania	DF	1995–1999	79	4	83	1	
Sinan Turhan	Turkey	FW	1981–1984	77	6	83	15	
Mete Basmacı	Turkey	FW	1958–1962	79	4	83	12	
Necmi Erdoğdu	Turkey	DF	1944–1955	82	0	82	5	
Olcay Başarır	Turkey	FW	1969–1973	71	10	81	6	
Nihat Bekdik	Turkey	MF	1920–1936	81	0	81	11	
Emre Kılınç	Turkey	MF	2020–2023	49	31	80	9	
Albert Riera	Spain	MF	2011–2014	63	17	80	4	
Falko Götz	Germany	FW	1992–1994	79	1	80	22	
Rober Eryol	Turkey	MF	1947–1957	80	0	80	1	
Christian Luyindama	Democratic Republic of the Congo	DF	2019–2023	68	11	79	5	
Enver Ürekli	Turkey	DF	1973–1976	70	9	79	4	
Fettah Dindar	Turkey	DF	1980–1983	74	4	78	0	
Garry Rodrigues	Cape Verde	MF	2017–2019	55	23	78	16	
Emre Akbaba	Turkey	MF	2018–2022	48	30	78	14	
Halil İbrahim Akçay	Turkey	DF	1982–1987	58	19	77	0	
Mehmet Ali Gültekin	Turkey	FW	1940–1948	76	1	77	18	
Ismail Jakobs	Senegal	DF	2024–	56	20	76	0	
Kerem Demirbay	Germany	MF	2023–2025	39	37	76	7	
Saša Ilić	Serbia	MF	2005–2007	65	11	76	25	
Aykut Erçetin	Turkey	GK	2003–2014	73	3	76	0	
Selahattin Almay	Turkey	FW	1938–1942	76	0	76	59	
Lukas Podolski	Germany	FW	2015–2017	66	9	75	34	
Mustafa Sarp	Turkey	MF	2009–2011	54	20	74	6	
Gökhan Zan	Turkey	DF	2009–2015	62	12	74	3	
Eren Elmalı	Turkey	DF	2025–	43	30	73	4	
Danyal Vuran	Turkey	FW	1932–1939	73	0	73	19	
Volkan Yaman	Turkey	DF	2007–2010	49	22	71	2	
Henry Onyekuru	Nigeria	MF	2018–2019, 2020, 2021	56	15	71	22	
Mirsad Sejdić	Yugoslavia	FW	1981–1984	68	3	71	28	
Doğan Koloğlu	Turkey	MF	1946–1954	71	0	71	1	
Suavi Atasagun	Turkey	MF	1932–1938	71	0	71	3	
Nuri Asan	Turkey	FW	1958–1964	66	4	70	7	
Gazanfer Olcayto	Turkey	FW	1941–1948	70	0	70	30	
Erdoğan Atlıoğlu	Turkey	GK	1944–1950	70	0	70	0	
Reinhard Stumpf	Germany	DF	1992–1994	68	1	69	2	
Kubilay Türkyılmaz	Switzerland	MF	1993–1996	48	20	68	25	
Hasan Kabze	Turkey	FW	2004–2007	17	51	68	19	
Sefer Karaer	Turkey	DF	1981–1986	62	6	68	1	
Kamil Altan	Turkey	DF	1952–1957	68	0	68	1	
Volkan Arslan	Turkey	MF	2002–2006	43	23	66	6	
Lionel Carole	France	DF	2015–2018	61	5	66	1	
Halil Dervişoğlu	Turkey	FW	2021, 2021–2022, 2023–	32	33	65	12	
João Batista Casemiro Marques	Brazil	MF	2001–2004	55	10	65	2	
Lincoln	Brazil	MF	2007–2009	59	6	65	16	
Yuto Nagatomo	Japan	DF	2018–2020	64	1	65	3	
Serkan Aykut	Turkey	FW	1999–2002	32	31	63	28	
Zafer Dinçer	Turkey	FW	1975–1979	48	15	63	6	
Akın Aksaçlı	Turkey	DF	1968–1970	56	7	63	0	
Patrick van Aanholt	Netherlands	DF	2021–2024	57	5	62	3	
Saffet Sancaklı	Turkey	FW	1994–1996	57	5	62	43	
Orhan Akyüz	Turkey	MF	1979–1982	57	5	62	7	
Mbaye Diagne	Senegal	FW	2019–2022	43	19	62	26	
Johan Elmander	Sweden	FW	2011–2013	52	9	61	17	
Fazıl Göknar	Turkey	DF	1946–1952	61	0	61	1	
Naci Erdem	Turkey	DF	1964–1966	60	0	60	0	
Alex Telles	Brazil	DF	2014–2016	54	6	60	2	
Leroy Sané	Germany	MF	2025–	44	15	59	7	
Hasan Vezir	Turkey	FW	1989–1991	47	12	59	18	
Rıdvan Kılıç	Turkey	DF	1976–1980	47	12	59	3	
Sérgio Oliveira	Portugal	MF	2022–2024	40	18	58	6	
Mostafa Mohamed	Egypt	FW	2021–2023	27	31	58	17	
Berkant Göktan	Turkey	MF	2001–2004	36	22	58	9	
Fernando	Brazil	MF	2017–2019	55	3	58	4	
Ahmet Keloğlu	Turkey	MF	1982–1984	49	9	58	4	
Mehmet Güven	Turkey	MF	2005–2009	22	35	57	2	
Maicon Pereira Roque	Brazil	DF	2017–2020	50	7	57	6	
Samim Yağız	Turkey	DF	1969–1974	45	12	57	1	
Süleyman Tekil	Turkey	FW	1936–1941	57	0	57	42	
Nordin Amrabat	Morocco	MF	2012–2015	22	34	56	3	
Engin Verel	Turkey	FW	1973–1975	52	4	56	7	
Hikmet Ebcim	Turkey	MF	1941–1945	56	0	56	34	
Ahmet Yılmaz Çalık	Turkey	DF	2017–2020	43	13	56	3	
Engin Baytar	Turkey	MF	2011–2015	39	16	55	5	
Bülent Akın	Turkey	MF	1999–2002	36	19	55	3	
Sarafim Madenli	Turkey	FW	1938–1943	55	0	55	18	
Ali Elveren	Turkey	DF	1968–1970	49	5	54	1	
Uğurcan Çakır	Turkey	GK	2025–	53	0	53	0	
Didier Drogba	Ivory Coast	FW	2013–2014	50	3	53	20	
Emre Güngör	Turkey	DF	2007–2010	39	13	52	0	
Engin Tuncer	Turkey	MF	1975–1977	31	21	52	1	
Lucas Neill	Australia	DF	2009–2011	50	1	51	1	
Serdar Aziz	Turkey	DF	2016–2019	50	1	51	5	
Roman Kosecki	Poland	FW	1990–1992	51	0	51	26	
Namık Sınmaz	Turkey	MF	1944–1947	51	0	51	0	
Ahmet Yıldırım	Turkey	DF	1999–2001	28	22	50	3	
Tayfun Hut	Turkey	MF	1990–1993	36	14	50	0	
Mustafa Yücedağ	Turkey	MF	1990–1992	34	16	50	5	
Koray Günter	Germany	DF	2014–2018	35	15	50	0	
Badou Ndiaye	Senegal	MF	2017–2018, 2018–2019	49	1	50	4	
Jason Denayer	Belgium	DF	2015–2016, 2017–2018	43	7	50	0	
Bekir Gür	Turkey	DF	1994–1997	38	11	49	2	
Tolga Ciğerci	Turkey	MF	2016–2018	39	10	49	6	
Nikola Büyükvafiadis	Turkey	FW	1938–1941	49	0	49	24	
Burhan Atak	Turkey	DF	1928–1934	49	0	49	6	
Sergen Yalçın	Turkey	MF	1999–2002	33	15	48	15	
Kerim Volkan Kilimci	Turkey	GK	1995–1998	47	1	48	0	
Fazıl Özkaptan	Turkey	FW	1932–1938	48	0	48	13	
Ceyhun Gülselam	Turkey	MF	2011–2014	22	25	47	3	
Márcio Mixirica	Brazil	FW	1999–2001	18	29	47	12	
Tayyar Cavcav	Turkey	MF	1953–1956	47	0	47	1	
Elano	Brazil	MF	2009–2011	38	9	47	7	
Dany Nounkeu	Cameroon	DF	2012–2015	45	1	46	0	
Şükrü Tetik	Turkey	FW	1976–1978	38	8	46	2	
Celal Kibarer	Turkey	MF	1937–1947	46	0	46	0	
Rebii Erkal	Turkey	FW	1928–1933	46	0	46	15	
Tetê	Brazil	MF	2023–2024	19	26	45	3	
Burak Dilmen	Turkey	FW	1984–1986	28	17	45	7	
Mehmet Leblebi	Turkey	FW	1928–1936	45	0	45	22	
İlkay Gündoğan	Germany	MF	2025–	24	20	44	2	
Marcelo Saracchi	Uruguay	DF	2020–2021	42	2	44	2	
Rüdiger Abramczik	Germany	FW	1984–1985	42	2	44	11	
Erol Boralı	Turkey	MF	1961–1965	43	1	44	2	
Mazlum Fırtına	Turkey	FW	1968–1970	28	16	44	3	
Ali Soydan	Turkey	FW	1951–1957	44	0	44	10	
Recep Adanır	Turkey	FW	1960–1962	44	0	44	8	
Wilfried Zaha	Ivory Coast	MF	2023–2026	20	23	43	10	
Radamel Falcao	Colombia	FW	2019–2021	27	16	43	20	
İlyas Kahraman	Turkey	MF	1994–1997	10	33	43	0	
Mustafa Kocabey	Turkey	MF	1992–1994	22	21	43	16	
Mário Jardel	Brazil	FW	2000–2001	41	2	43	34	
Haşim Birkan	Turkey	FW	1935–1938	43	0	43	33	
Elvir Baljić	Bosnia and Herzegovina	FW	2002–2005	27	15	42	3	
Ufuk Talay	Turkey	MF	1995–1999	27	15	42	1	
Tomáš Ujfaluši	Czech Republic	DF	2011–2013	41	1	42	1	
Norman Mapeza	Zimbabwe	DF	1994–1995	40	2	42	2	
Tarık Çamdal	Turkey	DF	2014–2019	32	10	42	0	
Suphi Batur	Turkey	MF	1928–1933	42	0	42	0	
Mithat Ertuğ	Turkey	MF	1928–1933	42	0	42	2	
Kazımcan Karataş	Turkey	DF	2022–	26	15	41	0	
Alexandru Cicâldău	Romania	MF	2021–2024	32	9	41	5	
İbrahim Ünal	Turkey	FW	1962–1964	40	1	41	6	
Niyazi Tamakan	Turkey	FW	1960–1962	41	0	41	4	
Koçis Kandidis	Turkey	DF	1946–1950	41	0	41	15	
Brad Friedel	United States	GK	1995–1997	40	0	40	0	
Suphi Soylu	Turkey	FW	1970–1974	25	15	40	4	
Erol Kaynak	Turkey	MF	1959–1962	40	0	40	6	
Reşat Erkal	Turkey	DF	1935–1938	40	0	40	6	
Sedat Balkanlı	Turkey	DF	1994–1995	38	1	39	8	
Morgan De Sanctis	Italy	GK	2008–2009	39	0	39	0	
Adrian Ilie	Romania	FW	1996–1998	37	2	39	20	
Iosif Rotariu	Romania	FW	1990–1992	38	1	39	5	
Gintaras Staučė	Lithuania	GK	1994–1995	39	0	39	0	
Ayhan Akbin	Turkey	FW	1981–1985	35	4	39	8	
César Prates	Brazil	DF	2003–2004	35	3	38	6	
Abdul Kader Keïta	Ivory Coast	FW	2009–2010	33	5	38	10	
Ufuk Ceylan	Turkey	GK	2009–2014	36	2	38	0	
Ahmet Tuna Kozan	Turkey	MF	1964–1967	38	0	38	0	
Halis Etçi	Turkey	FW	1946–1949	38	0	38	11	
Emre Taşdemir	Turkey	DF	2019–2023	24	13	37	1	
Ovidiu Petre	Romania	MF	2003–2005	32	5	37	1	
Ulrich van Gobbel	Netherlands	DF	1995–1997	37	0	37	2	
Tacettin Ergürsel	Turkey	FW	1977–1979	28	9	37	5	
Ergin Gürses	Turkey	FW	1963–1969	33	4	37	7	
Savaş Yarbay	Turkey	MF	1970–1973	26	11	37	1	
Jean Michaël Seri	Ivory Coast	MF	2019–2020	33	4	37	2	
Wilfried Singo	Ivory Coast	DF	2025–	19	17	36	2	
Ahmed Kutucu	Turkey	FW	2025–	12	24	36	4	
Günay Güvenç	Turkey	GK	2023–	31	5	36	0	
Olimpiu Moruțan	Romania	MF	2021–2023	17	19	36	3	
Fernando Meira	Portugal	DF	2008–2009	36	0	36	0	
Bilal Kısa	Turkey	MF	2015–2016	24	12	36	8	
Mustafa Turgat	Turkey	MF	1981–1983	26	10	36	1	
Muhlis Gülen	Turkey	FW	1968–1970	20	16	36	1	
Hikmet Öziş	Turkey	FW	1950–1954	36	0	36	10	
Muslih Peykoğlu	Turkey	FW	1922–1924, 1926–1934	36	0	36	13	
DeAndre Yedlin	United States	DF	2021–2022	32	4	36	1	
Elias Jelert	Denmark	DF	2024–	12	23	35	1	
Mehmet Bölükbaşı	Turkey	GK	1997–2004	31	4	35	0	
Evren Nuri Turhan	Turkey	MF	1995–1997	24	11	35	2	
Leo Franco	Argentina	GK	2009–2010	35	0	35	0	
Colin Kazim-Richards	Turkey	MF	2010–2012	33	2	35	7	
Şevket Candar	Turkey	FW	1991–1993	15	20	35	5	
Özcan Başaran	Turkey	MF	1947–1953	35	0	35	0	
Muhtar Tunçaltan	Turkey	FW	1947–1954	35	0	35	12	
Hakim Ziyech	Morocco	MF	2023–2025	18	16	34	8	
Junichi Inamoto	Japan	MF	2006–2007	34	0	34	1	
Adem Büyük	Turkey	FW	2019–2020	16	18	34	11	
Sébastien Pérez	France	DF	2001–2002	27	6	33	4	
Murat İnan	Turkey	DF	1973–1983	14	19	33	0	
Josué Pesqueira	Portugal	MF	2016–2017	17	16	33	4	
Enver Özdemir	Turkey	DF	1955–1958	33	0	33	3	
Samim Uygun	Turkey	FW	1960–1962	33	0	33	3	
İsmet Kalaoğlu	Turkey	DF	1944–1947	33	0	33	0	
Bedii Etingü	Turkey	FW	1938–1940	33	0	33	2	
Kemal Faruki	Turkey	FW	1922–1934	33	0	33	21	
Alioum Saidou	Cameroon	MF	2004–2006	31	1	32	0	
Dean Saunders	Wales	FW	1995–1996	29	3	32	21	
Kemal Yıldırım	Turkey	FW	1979–1981	25	7	32	4	
Yüksel Alkan	Turkey	GK	1954–1960	32	0	32	0	
Korhan Tınaz	Turkey	FW	1972–1974	21	11	32	4	
Şahap Turgan	Turkey	FW	1942–1946	32	0	32	19	
Ekrem Kapman	Turkey	MF	1936–1939	32	0	32	0	
Léo Dubois	France	DF	2022–2024	16	15	31	1	
Orkun Uşak	Turkey	GK	2007–2009	30	1	31	0	
Lorik Cana	Albania	MF	2010–2011	25	6	31	1	
Arif Kuşdoğan	Turkey	DF	1972–1977	25	6	31	0	
Güngör Okay	Turkey	MF	1955–1957	31	0	31	7	
Michy Batshuayi	Belgium	FW	2024–2025	5	25	30	7	
Milot Rashica	Kosovo	MF	2022–2023	23	7	30	6	
Flávio Conceição	Brazil	MF	2004–2005	30	0	30	2	
Caner Erkin	Turkey	MF	2009–2010	29	1	30	3	
Serkan Kurtuluş	Turkey	DF	2008–2011	23	7	30	0	
Metin Çekiçler	Turkey	FW	1979–1982	19	11	30	2	
İsmet Yurtsü	Turkey	MF	1964–1966	30	0	30	2	
Necdet Şentürk	Turkey	MF	1953–1956	30	0	30	2	
Okan Kocuk	Turkey	GK	2019–2023	27	2	29	0	
Oğulcan Çağlayan	Turkey	FW	2020–2023	14	15	29	4	
Fábio Pinto	Brazil	FW	2002–2004	14	15	29	2	
Faruk Atalay	Turkey	MF	2000–2003	6	23	29	0	
Andrés Fleurquin	Uruguay	MF	2001–2002	18	11	29	3	
Serhat Güller	Turkey	DF	1988–1991	20	9	29	1	
İbrahim Sokullu	Turkey	DF	1979–1983	15	14	29	4	
Oghenekaro Etebo	Nigeria	MF	2020–2021	16	13	29	0	
Fredrik Midtsjø	Norway	MF	2022–2023	8	20	28	2	
Gustavo Victoria	Colombia	DF	2001–2002	25	3	28	1	
Serkan Çalık	Turkey	FW	2007–2010	13	15	28	5	
Osman Coşkun	Turkey	MF	1997–2000	12	16	28	1	
Erdal Tuncer	Turkey	DF	1967–1968	21	7	28	0	
Osman Alyanak	Turkey	DF	1932–1939	28	0	28	1	
Kadri Dağ	Turkey	MF	1933–1936	28	0	28	3	
Şener Özbayraklı	Turkey	DF	2019–2021	16	11	27	0	
Florin Bratu	Romania	FW	2003–2004	19	8	27	7	
Hasan Yıldırım	Turkey	FW	1985–1986	6	21	27	5	
Birol Yalçın	Turkey	FW	1982–1984	10	17	27	5	
Ešref Jašarević	Yugoslavia	MF	1979	27	0	27	9	
İbrahim Tusder	Turkey	MF	1932–1936	27	0	27	1	
Yusuf Demir	Austria	MF	2022–2026	6	20	26	2	
Tanguy Ndombele	France	MF	2023–2024	6	20	26	0	
Kerem İnan	Turkey	GK	1998–2003	24	2	26	0	
Sercan Yıldırım	Turkey	FW	2011–2016	8	18	26	5	
Ruhi Karaduman	Turkey	DF	1949–1950	26	0	26	0	
Halil Burnaz	Turkey	MF	1940–1943	26	0	26	0	
Didier Six	France	FW	1987–1988	21	4	25	3	
Juan Pablo Pino	Colombia	FW	2010–2013	17	8	25	6	
Nezih Ali Boloğlu	Turkey	GK	1990–1996	22	3	25	0	
Bahattin Demircan	Turkey	GK	1977–1979	22	3	25	0	
Cengiz Özyalçın	Turkey	FW	1958–1960	23	2	25	5	
Latif Yalınlı	Turkey	FW	1928–1933	25	0	25	17	
