= Tugay Kerimoğlu =

Turkish footballer and manager (born 1970)

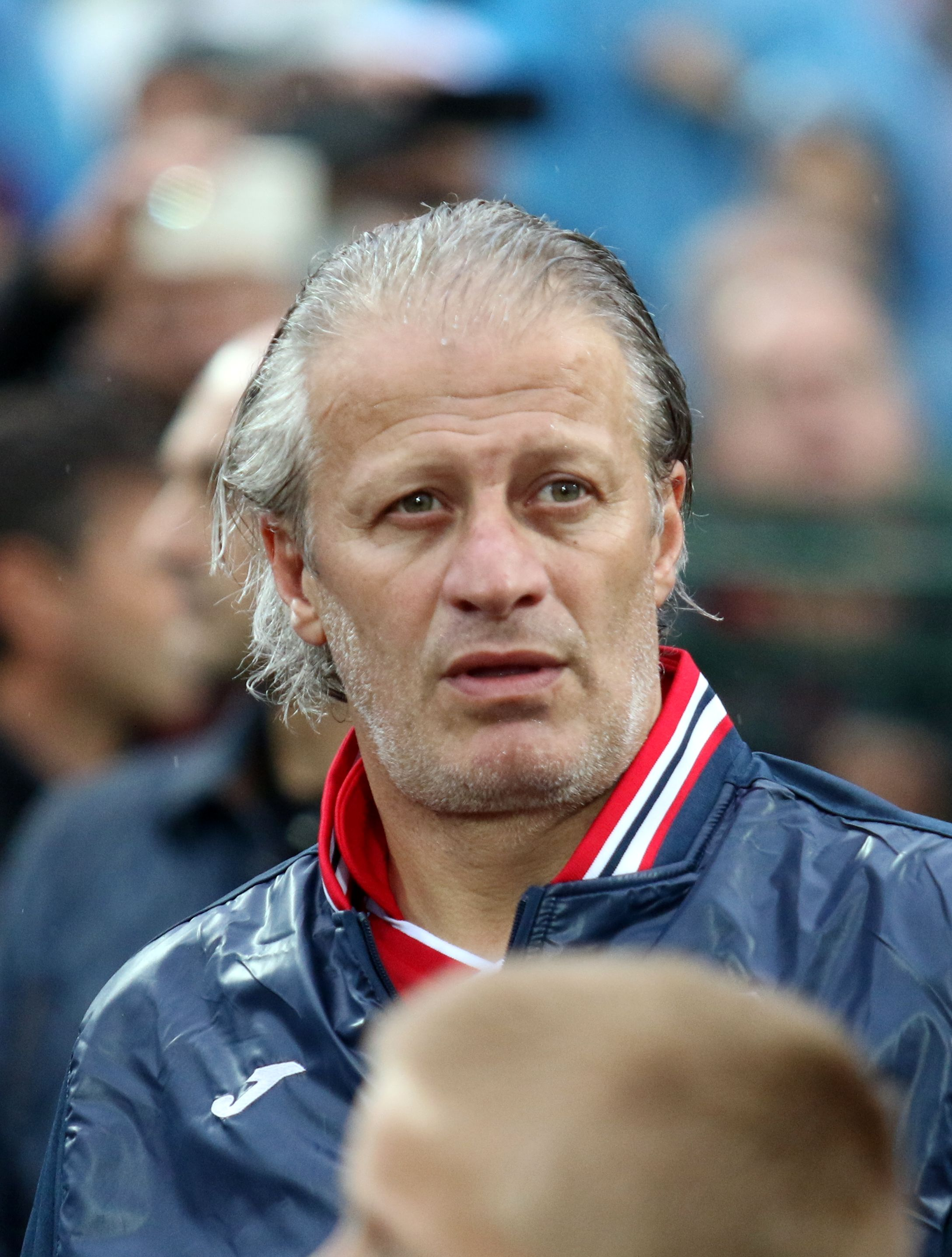
- Tugay in 2016

Personal information
- Full name: Tugay Kerimoğlu
- Date of birth: 24 August 1970 (age 56)
- Place of birth: Istanbul, Turkey
- Height: 1.76 m (5 ft 9 in)
- Position: Midfielder

Youth career
- –1983: Trabzonspor
- 1983–1987: Galatasaray A2

Senior career*
Years	Team	Apps	(Gls)
1987–1999	Galatasaray	279	(34)
1999–2001	Rangers	42	(4)
2001–2009	Blackburn Rovers	233	(11)
Total		554	(49)

International career
1986–1987	Turkey U16	13	(1)
1987–1988	Turkey U18	8	(0)
1988–1991	Turkey U21	20	(3)
1990–2007	Turkey	94	(2)

Managerial career
- 2010: Galatasaray A2
- 2015–2016: Şanlıurfaspor
Medal record
Representing Turkey
Men's football
FIFA World Cup
Third place	2002 Korea/Japan
Mediterranean Games
Gold medal – first place	1993 Languedoc-Roussillon
- * Club domestic league appearances and goals

Tugay Kerimoğlu (born 24 August 1970), known in England as just Tugay, is a Turkish former professional footballer who played as a midfielder. He played most notably for Galatasaray, followed by Rangers and Blackburn Rovers. After retirement, he was the coordinator of the Galatasaray youth academy, after a short spell working with Mark Hughes at Manchester City. He then served as Roberto Mancini's assistant at Galatasaray during the 2013–14 season.

== Club career ==
Tugay was born and raised in Istanbul. He started playing football in the youth academy of Trabzonspor. His father, Özkan, was a semi-professional footballer before becoming a bank manager and his brother, Tolgay, was also a football player.

He played for Galatasaray from 1987 to 2000, where he won the Turkish League six times and the Turkish Cup four times. The midfielder was made captain at Galatasaray in the 1992–93 season, making him the youngest captain in the history of his club. He had signed for Scottish club Rangers in the January 2000 mid season transfer window, and joined Blackburn Rovers for the 2001–02 season.

Former Galatasaray boss Graeme Souness brought Tugay to Ewood Park from Scottish side Rangers in the summer of 2001 for a £1.3m fee. His debut for Rovers was as a substitute against Sunderland. His first goal came on 14 October 2001 in a 7–1 home thrashing against West Ham United in which he scored with a trademark effort from outside the box, lobbing the keeper. Tugay immediately became a fan favourite at Blackburn, where he was an integral part of the club's success on the field since his first season. He missed Blackburn's League Cup final win in 2002 through suspension. Tugay was named Blackburn's Player of the Year in the 2003–04 campaign.

Tugay's final career goal came against Portsmouth in a 3–2 Premier League defeat at Fratton Park on 30 November 2008. He retired from football on 24 May 2009 at the age of 38. His last game was against West Bromwich Albion at home at Ewood Park in front of a crowd of over 28,000 fans, who applauded Tugay during the match when he was substituted in the 85th minute to be replaced by Swedish left back Martin Olsson.

== International career ==
Tugay has represented Turkey at Euro 1996, Euro 2000 and the 2002 FIFA World Cup, where Turkey finished in the quarter finals of Euro 2000 and third place in the 2002 World Cup. He retired from international football in 2003 after Turkey failed to qualify for Euro 2004 in order to focus on his Blackburn Rovers career. His last match was on 5 June 2007 in a friendly against Brazil in Dortmund, Germany. He wore number 94 to commemorate his 94 caps for his country.

== Style of play and reception ==
Primarily a deep-lying playmaker in midfield, he was also competent as an attacking midfielder or playing in the holding role. He was widely recognised for his ability and was highly rated in the football industry. In 2000, former Romanian midfielder Gheorghe Hagi rated him as one of the finest ball-playing midfielders in Europe, and in 2006, Manchester United manager Sir Alex Ferguson had suggested that if he were ten years younger, Tugay's ability would make him an ideal player for the Old Trafford team. When Tugay's manager at the time, Mark Hughes, was asked if he too wished Tugay was ten years younger, his answer was "No, because if he was, he'd be playing in a Barcelona shirt."

== Managerial career ==
On 3 June 2009, Tugay began working with his former manager Mark Hughes behind the scenes at Manchester City academy in a coaching role. He was linked for various assistant positions for the Turkey national team after Fatih Terim's departure, then he became the coordinator for the Galatasaray youth academy in February 2010.

On 21 October 2010, Galatasaray announced that Tugay was assigned for the position of the new assistant coach for Galatasaray, alongside of Gheorghe Hagi. On 22 March 2011, Hagi was sacked following a string of poor results. Tugay refused to become the head coach until the end of the season, saying it would be wrong to accept the position for the head coach right after the sacking of Hagi.

On 4 October 2013, Galatasaray SK announced that Tugay was assigned again for the position of the new assistant coach for Galatasaray, this time alongside of Roberto Mancini. However, after Mancini's dismissal at the end of the 2013–14 season, he left his position.

In November 2015, Tugay took over Şanlıurfaspor in the Turkish second division as head coach for. He left in April 2016 by mutual agreement.

== Personal life ==
Tugay generally keeps himself out of the media spotlight, and even with very good English and an apparent good sense of humour, he rarely gives an interview, even to his previous club's own radio station (Radio Rovers). Tugay was married to Etkin, a former Galatasaray and Turkish international basketball player. He has two children.Tugay is a Muslim, stating that his religious beliefs are "something which is in my heart and I don't need to express that to other people".

== Career statistics ==
=== Club ===
Appearances and goals by club, season and competition
Club	Season	League			National Cup		League Cup		Europe		Total	
Club	Season	Division	Apps	Goals	Apps	Goals	Apps	Goals	Apps	Goals	Apps	Goals
Galatasaray	1987–88	1.Lig	4	0	2	0	1	0	–		7	0
Galatasaray	1988–89	1.Lig	16	0	4	0	3	0	1	0	24	0
Galatasaray	1989–90	1.Lig	23	0	1	0	2	0	2	0	28	0
Galatasaray	1990–91	1.Lig	12	0	2	1	3	0	–		17	1
Galatasaray	1991–92	1.Lig	26	3	2	1	2	0	–		30	4
Galatasaray	1992–93	1.Lig	25	6	6	1	3	0	5	0	39	7
Galatasaray	1993–94	1.Lig	25	12	5	0	3	0	10	0	43	12
Galatasaray	1994–95	1.Lig	23	1	6	2	3	0	7	0	39	3
Galatasaray	1995–96	1.Lig	30	3	6	0	3	0	2	0	41	3
Galatasaray	1996–97	1.Lig	33	4	1	0	1	0	–		35	4
Galatasaray	1997–98	1.Lig	30	2	7	1	3	0	8	2	48	5
Galatasaray	1998–99	1.Lig	22	2	7	0	1	0	5	0	34	2
Galatasaray	Total		279	34	50	6	28	0	45	3	402	43
Rangers	1999–2000	Scottish Premier League	16	1	–		–		–		16	1
Rangers	2000–01	Scottish Premier League	26	3	0	0	0	0	7	0	33	3
Rangers	Total		42	4	0	0	0	0	7	0	49	4
Blackburn Rovers	2001–02	Premier League	33	3	0	0	6	0	–		39	3
Blackburn Rovers	2002–03	Premier League	37	1	0	0	4	0	4 (Note: Appearances in UEFA Cup)	0	41	1
Blackburn Rovers	2003–04	Premier League	36	2	0	0	1	0	2	0	38	2
Blackburn Rovers	2004–05	Premier League	21	0	2	1	1	0	–		24	1
Blackburn Rovers	2005–06	Premier League	27	1	1	0	5	0	–		33	1
Blackburn Rovers	2006–07	Premier League	30	1	3	0	0	0	7	1	40	2
Blackburn Rovers	2007–08	Premier League	20	2	1	0	1	0	5	0	27	2
Blackburn Rovers	2008–09	Premier League	29	1	3	0	4	0	–		36	1
Blackburn Rovers	Total		233	11	10	1	8	0	18	1	293	13
Career total			554	49	60	6	50	0	70	4	744	60

=== International ===
Appearances and goals by national team and year
National team	Year	Apps	Goals
Turkey	1990	3	0
Turkey	1991	6	0
Turkey	1992	6	0
Turkey	1993	5	0
Turkey	1994	3	0
Turkey	1995	11	0
Turkey	1996	10	2
Turkey	1997	3	0
Turkey	1998	3	0
Turkey	1999	5	0
Turkey	2000	4	0
Turkey	2001	6	0
Turkey	2002	16	0
Turkey	2003	11	0
Turkey	2004	0	0
Turkey	2005	0	0
Turkey	2006	0	0
Turkey	2007	2	0
Total		94	2

== Honours ==
Galatasaray

- 1.Lig: 1987–88, 1992–93, 1993–94, 1996–97, 1997–98, 1998–99
- Turkish Cup: 1990–91, 1992–93, 1995–96, 1998–99
- Turkish Super Cup: 1988, 1991, 1993, 1996, 1997
- Prime Minister's Cup: 1990, 1995

Rangers

- Scottish Premier League: 1999–2000
- Scottish Cup: 1999–2000

Blackburn Rovers

- Football League Cup: 2001–02

Turkey U21

- Mediterranean Games: 1993

Turkey

- FIFA World Cup Third place: 2002

Individual

- Blackburn Rovers Player of the Year: 2003–04

Order

- Turkish State Medal of Distinguished Service
