= 1990–91 Turkish Cup =

Türkiye Kupası

Tournament details
- Country: Turkey
- Teams: 105

Final positions
- Champions: Galatasaray
- Runners-up: Ankaragücü

Tournament statistics
- Matches played: 104
- Goals scored: 338 (3.25 per match)
- Top goal scorer(s): Hasan Yıldırım (5 goals)

The 1990–91 Turkish Cup was the 29h edition of the tournament that determined the association football Süper Lig Turkish Cup (Turkish: Türkiye Kupası) champion under the auspices of the Turkish Football Federation (Turkish: Türkiye Futbol Federasyonu; TFF). champion under the auspices of the Turkish Football Federation (Turkish: Türkiye Futbol Federasyonu; TFF). Trabzonspor successfully contested Bursaspor on both legs of the finals. The results of the tournament also determined which clubs would be promoted or relegated.

== First round ==
Team 1	Score	Team 2
Aksarayspor	5–1	Osmaniyespor
Bucaspor	0–2	Altınordu
Şekerspor	3–2	Karabükspor
Feriköy	2–0	Vefa
Alanyaspor	0–2	Muğlaspor
Altay	7–1	Kütahyaspor
Anadolu Hisarı İdman Yurdu	1–2	Beylerbeyi
Antalyaspor	1–3	Sökespor
Bandırmaspor	1–0	Kartalspor
Bayburtspor	0–0 (7–6 p)	Bafraspor
Bingölspor	0–0 (8–7 p)	Mardinspor
Bozüyükspor	2–5	Mustafakemalpaşaspor
Çeşmespor	0–3	Turgutluspor
Çorumspor	4–1	Sivasspor
Dardanelspor	3–1	Manisaspor
Denizlispor	3–0	Kuşadasıspor
Düzcespor	3–1	Erdemir Ereğlispor
Eyüpspor	2–1	Sakaryaspor
Karagümrük	2–1	Kocaelispor
Gaziosmanpaşaspor	2–0	Mudurnuspor
Giresunspor	0–1	Çaykur Rizespor
Gölcükspor	2–0	Tavşanlı Linyitspor
Gönenspor	3–0	Ayvalıkgücü
Görelespor	1–0	TEK 12 Martspor
Izmirspor	2–0	Yeni Salihlispor
Kasımpaşa	0–1	Beykozspor
Kayserispor	0–2	Adana Polisgücü
Keçiörengücü	3–1	Eskişehirspor
Malatyaspor	3–1	Erzurumspor
Mersin İdman Yurdu	8–2	Kahramanmaraşspor
Niğdespor	2–1	Hatayspor
Samsunspor	5–0	Orduspor
Sarayköyspor	0–0 (6–7 p)	Nazillispor
Siirtspor	2–1	Elazığspor
Silivrispor	3–1	Lüleburgazspor
Silvanspor	1–0	Muşspor
Torbalıspor	3–1	Marmarisspor
PTT	0–1	Polatlıspor
Ankara Demirspor	1–1 (2–4 p)	Amasyaspor

== Second round ==
Team 1	Score	Team 2
Petrol Ofisi	3–1	Şekerspor
Bayburtspor	5–0	Görelespor
Bingölspor	3–0 (aet)	Silvanspor
Diyarbakırspor	3–0	Siirtspor
Malatyaspor	5–1	Vanspor
Ünyespor	2–1	Çaykur Rizespor
Çorumspor	2–1	Amasyaspor
Düzcespor	2–0	Beylerbeyi
Nevşehirspor	1–0	Mersin İdman Yurdu
Niğdespor	2–0	Adana Demirspor
Samsunspor	4–0	Akçaabat Sebatspor
Altınordu	0–1	İzmirspor
Bandırmaspor	3–1 (aet)	Gönenspor
Beykozspor	2–0	İnegölspor
Dardanelspor	2–1	Turgutluspor
Denizlispor	3–2	Sökespor
Eyüpspor	3–2	Karagümrük
Gölcükspor	3–0	Mustafakemalpaşaspor
Keçiörengücü	6–2	Polatlıspor
Muğlaspor	1–2 (aet)	Yeni Afyonspor
Silivrispor	3–0	Feriköy
Torbalıspor	4–0	Nazillispor
Yalovaspor	1–0	Gaziosmanpaşaspor
Göztepe	0–1 (aet)	Altay

== Third round ==
Team 1	Score	Team 2
Bayburtspor	3–0	Bingölspor
Diyarbakırspor	4–2	Malatyaspor
Ünyespor	1–3 (aet)	Samsunspor
Düzcespor	4–1	Çorumspor
Nevşehirspor	1–0	Niğdespor
Petrol Ofisi	1–4 (aet)	Keçiörengücü
Beykozspor	1–0	Bandırmaspor
Denizlispor	4–0	Yeni Afyonspor
Eyüpspor	1–1 (4–5 p)	Yalovaspor
Gölcükspor	1–0	Silivrispor
Izmirspor	1–5	Altay
Torbalıspor	3–0	Dardanelspor

== Fourth round ==
Team 1	Score	Team 2
Altay	2–2 (4–3 p)	Denizlispor
Bayburtspor	2–2 (5–6 p)	Düzcespor
Gölcükspor	4–1	Torbalıspor
Keçiörengücü	1–2	Samsunspor
Nevşehirspor	2–1	Diyarbakırspor
Yalovaspor	3–1	Beykozspor

== Fifth round ==
Team 1	Score	Team 2
Adana Polisgücü	0–1	Karşıyaka
Altay	4–1	Adanaspor
Ankaragücü	2–2 (4–1 p)	Boluspor
Bursaspor	1–0	Gölcükspor
Düzcespor	0–1	Zeytinburnuspor
Gaziantepspor	2–0	Aksarayspor
Nevşehirspor	0–1	Konyaspor
Samsunspor	2–1	Yalovaspor

== Sixth round ==
Team 1	Score	Team 2
Gençlerbirliği	2–5	Bakırköyspor
Sarıyer	3–0	Karşıyaka
Ankaragücü	2–0	Altay
Fenerbahçe	2–1	Gaziantepspor
Konyaspor	0–1	Galatasaray
Samsunspor	0–1	Beşiktaş
Trabzonspor	5–3	Bursaspor
Zeytinburnuspor	2–4	Aydınspor

== Quarter-finals ==
Team 1	Score	Team 2
Trabzonspor	2–1	Bakırköyspor
Ankaragücü	4–0	Aydınspor
Fenerbahçe	2–2 (4–3 p)	Sarıyer
Beşiktaş	2–2 (4–5 p)	Galatasaray

== Semi-finals ==
=== Summary table ===
Team 1	Score	Team 2
Fenerbahçe	1–3	Ankaragücü
Galatasaray	2–1	Trabzonspor

=== Matches ===
13 March 1991 Semi-final	Fenerbahçe	1–3	Ankaragücü	Istanbul
13:00 EET (UTC+02)	Hakan 14'		Cengiz 5', 88'; Abdullah 80'	Stadium: Fenerbahçe Stadium; Referee: Sadık Deda

13 March 1991 Semi-final	Galatasaray	2–1	Trabzonspor	Istanbul
13:00 EET (UTC+02)	Erdal 48'; Tanju 109' (pen.)		Hami 75' (pen.)	Stadium: Ali Sami Yen Stadium; Referee: Ahmet Çakar

== Final ==
8 May 1991 Final	Ankaragücü	1–3 (a.e.t.)	Galatasaray	İzmir
18:00 EEST (UTC+03)	Cengiz 17'		Tanju 18'; Uğur 106'; Tugay 120'	Stadium: İzmir Atatürk Stadium; Referee: Hasan Ceylan
