= 1990–91 1.Lig =

33rd season of top-tier Turkish football

1.Lig
- Season: 1990–91
- Champions: Beşiktaş; 9th title
- Relegated: Zeytinburnuspor; Karşıyaka; Adanaspor
- European Cup: Beşiktaş
- Cup Winners' Cup: Galatasaray
- UEFA Cup: Trabzonspor
- Matches played: 240
- Goals scored: 672 (2.8 per match)
- Top goalscorer: Tanju Çolak (31 goals)

Statistics of the Turkish First Football League in season 1990/1991.

== Overview ==
It was contested by 16 teams, and Beşiktaş J.K. won the championship.

== League table ==
Pos	Team	Pld	W	D	L	GF	GA	GD	Pts	Qualification or relegation
1	Beşiktaş (C)	30	20	9	1	63	24	+39	69	Qualification to European Cup first round
2	Galatasaray	30	19	7	4	63	31	+32	64	Qualification to Cup Winners' Cup first round
3	Trabzonspor	30	14	9	7	55	37	+18	51	Qualification to UEFA Cup first round
4	Sarıyer	30	11	12	7	39	34	+5	45	Invitation to Balkans Cup
5	Fenerbahçe	30	12	8	10	53	53	0	44	
6	Bakırköyspor	30	12	7	11	53	41	+12	43	
7	MKE Ankaragücü	30	11	8	11	46	43	+3	41	
8	Bursaspor	30	11	5	14	31	36	−5	38	
9	Boluspor	30	8	13	9	35	37	−2	37	
10	Gençlerbirliği	30	9	9	12	36	47	−11	36	
11	Aydınspor	30	7	13	10	44	51	−7	34	
12	Konyaspor	30	10	4	16	33	45	−12	34	
13	Gaziantepspor	30	9	6	15	29	45	−16	33	
14	Zeytinburnuspor (R)	30	6	11	13	26	40	−14	29	Relegation to Turkish Second Football League
15	Karşıyaka (R)	30	6	8	16	32	50	−18	26	Relegation to Turkish Second Football League
16	Adanaspor (R)	30	5	11	14	34	58	−24	26	Relegation to Turkish Second Football League

Rules for classification: 1) points; 2) goal difference; 3) number of goals scored.
(C) Champions; (R) Relegated

== Results ==
Home \ Away	ADA	AYD	BAK	BJK	BOL	BUR	FNB	GAL	GAZ	GEN	KSK	KON	AGÜ	SAR	TRA	ZEY
Adanaspor		2–2	1–1	0–0	2–2	0–4	3–2	2–2	3–0	1–1	3–2	2–1	3–5	0–0	0–1	1–3
Aydınspor	3–0		0–0	3–5	3–3	1–0	1–5	1–2	0–0	1–1	1–0	2–1	3–1	1–1	2–2	1–0
Bakırköyspor	3–0	3–1		2–4	3–1	1–2	2–2	0–2	7–2	2–1	1–1	2–0	7–1	2–0	1–4	0–0
Beşiktaş	1–1	4–2	2–0		1–0	2–0	1–1	1–1	3–0	0–0	1–1	3–0	3–0	1–0	3–2	5–0
Boluspor	4–1	2–2	2–0	1–3		0–0	2–4	1–0	2–0	2–0	1–4	2–1	0–0	1–1	2–0	0–0
Bursaspor	3–1	2–2	1–4	0–1	1–0		2–0	0–1	0–1	2–2	2–1	2–1	1–0	0–2	1–3	0–1
Fenerbahçe	2–0	1–6	1–0	0–2	2–1	0–0		1–2	2–0	2–1	3–3	1–0	1–1	0–0	3–5	0–0
Galatasaray	5–2	6–2	2–1	2–3	1–1	2–1	4–1		1–0	2–0	6–1	2–1	0–0	5–1	3–1	2–0
Gaziantepspor	0–0	1–0	0–1	0–1	2–0	1–2	2–5	1–0		4–1	1–1	3–2	1–0	1–1	0–0	1–0
Gençlerbirliği	2–1	1–1	1–1	2–0	0–0	2–1	3–0	0–3	2–2		1–0	1–0	2–2	1–2	2–1	2–0
Karşıyaka	0–0	2–0	2–1	0–3	0–0	0–1	2–6	1–2	1–0	2–1		0–1	0–2	2–2	0–2	0–0
Konyaspor	2–0	1–1	1–0	1–4	0–1	1–0	2–3	1–1	2–1	1–2	1–0		3–2	1–0	3–1	1–0
MKE Ankaragücü	2–0	3–1	0–2	2–2	1–1	3–0	3–3	0–1	1–2	7–2	1–0	3–0		0–1	1–0	2–2
Sarıyer	2–1	1–1	2–2	0–1	2–0	1–2	2–1	2–2	2–1	4–1	3–2	1–1	1–0		1–1	3–1
Trabzonspor	1–1	0–0	4–1	3–3	1–1	0–0	3–0	3–0	4–2	2–1	3–2	3–1	0–1	1–0		1–1
Zeytinburnuspor	2–3	1–0	1–3	0–0	2–2	2–1	0–1	0–1	1–0	1–0	1–2	2–2	1–2	1–1	1–3	

Source: TFF, Mackolik
Legend: Blue = home team win; Yellow = draw; Red = away team win.
