= İlker Yağcıoğlu =

Turkish footballer

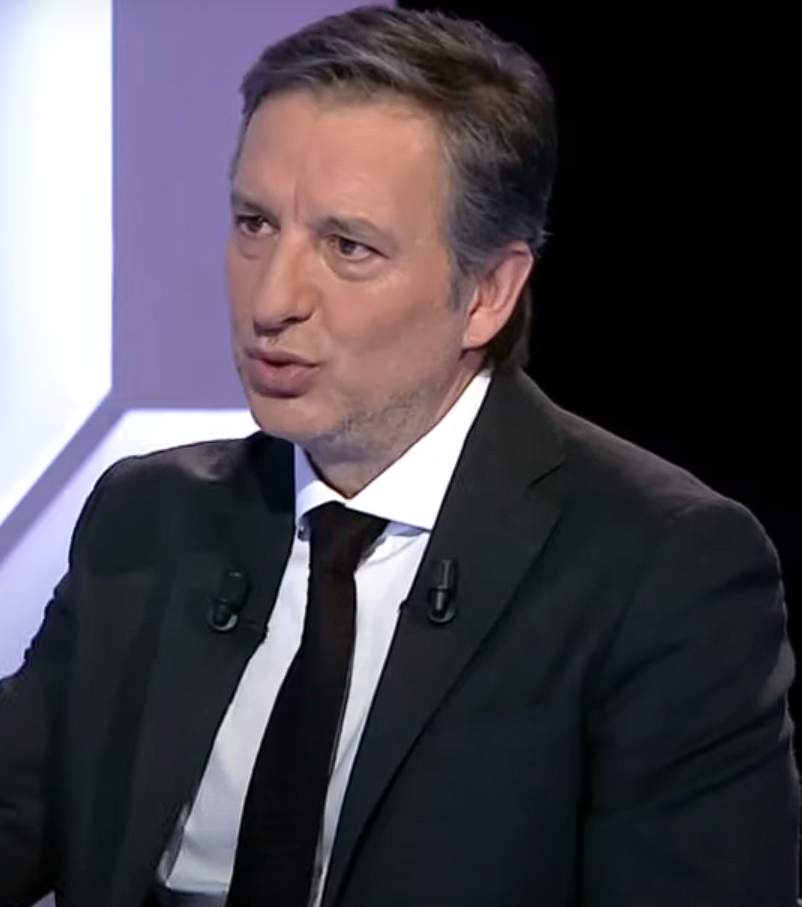

Personal information
- Date of birth: 10 March 1966 (age 60)
- Place of birth: Adapazarı, Turkey
- Height: 1.78 m (5 ft 10 in)
- Position: Right back

Senior career*
| Years | Team | Apps | (Gls) |
| 1986–1990 | Sakaryaspor | | |
| 1990–1992 | Aydınspor | | |
| 1992–1999 | Fenerbahçe | | |
| 1999–2000 | Kocaelispor | | |
| 2001 | Sarıyer | | |
| 2001–2003 | İstanbulspor | | |

International career
| 1994–2001 | Turkey | 10 | (0) |

Managerial career
- 2004–2005: Kayserispor (assistant)
- 2006: Malatyaspor (assistant)
- 2006–2007: Ankaragücü (assistant)
- 2008: Çaykur Rizespor (assistant)
- 2008: Sakaryaspor
- 2010–2011: Sarıyer
- * Club domestic league appearances and goals

İlker Yağcıoğlu (born 10 March 1966) is a retired Turkish football midfielder and later manager.
