= Rostislav Jeřábek =

Czech footballer

Personal information
- Date of birth: 29 March 1962 (age 64)
- Place of birth: Ostrava, Czechoslovakia
- Position: Forward

Senior career*
Years	Team	Apps	(Gls)
1986–1990	FC Vítkovice	68	(16)
1990–1992	Adanaspor	45	(11)
1992–1993	Konyaspor	14	(3)
1993	FC Haka	7	(3)
1993–1994	FC Vítkovice	5	(0)
- * Club domestic league appearances and goals

Rostislav Jeřábek (born 29 March 1962 in Ostrava) is a retired Czech professional footballer who played for several clubs in Europe.

== Club career ==
Jeřábek spent most of his professional career with FC Vítkovice. He had a spell in the Turkish Super Lig with Adanaspor and Konyaspor and in Finnish Veikkausliiga with Haka.
