= 1992–93 1.Lig =

35th season of top-tier Turkish football

1.Lig
- Season: 1992–93
- Champions: Galatasaray; 9th title
- Relegated: Bakırköyspor; Aydınspor; Konyaspor
- Champions League: Galatasaray
- Cup Winners' Cup: Beşiktaş
- UEFA Cup: Trabzonspor; Kocaelispor
- Matches: 240
- Goals: 716 (2.98 per match)
- Top goalscorer: Tanju Çolak (27 goals)

The 1992-93 Turkish First Football League season had 16 teams in competition. Galatasaray S.K. won the championship with the help of goal difference, although there have been persistent allegations of match-fixing against Galatasaray.

== League table ==
Pos	Team	Pld	W	D	L	GF	GA	GD	Pts	Qualification or relegation
1	Galatasaray (C)	30	20	6	4	74	21	+53	66	Qualification to Champions League first round
2	Beşiktaş	30	19	9	2	68	23	+45	66	Qualification to Cup Winners' Cup first round
3	Trabzonspor	30	17	9	4	57	27	+30	60	Qualification to UEFA Cup first round
4	Kocaelispor	30	17	8	5	56	30	+26	59	Qualification to UEFA Cup first round
5	Fenerbahçe	30	18	4	8	75	41	+34	58	
6	Bursaspor	30	12	6	12	42	42	0	42	
7	Altay	30	11	4	15	34	40	−6	37	
8	MKE Ankaragücü	30	11	4	15	40	59	−19	37	
9	Sarıyer	30	10	5	15	39	45	−6	35	
10	Gençlerbirliği	30	9	8	13	41	56	−15	35	
11	Gaziantepspor	30	10	5	15	40	56	−16	35	
12	Kayserispor	30	7	11	12	26	39	−13	32	
13	Karşıyaka	30	7	9	14	36	54	−18	30	
14	Bakırköyspor (R)	30	8	5	17	36	48	−12	29	Relegation to Turkish Second Football League
15	Aydınspor (R)	30	6	9	15	23	50	−27	27	Relegation to Turkish Second Football League
16	Konyaspor (R)	30	2	10	18	29	85	−56	16	Relegation to Turkish Second Football League

Rules for classification: 1) points; 2) goal difference; 3) number of goals scored.
(C) Champions; (R) Relegated

== Results ==
Home \ Away	ALT	AYD	BAK	BJK	BUR	FNB	GAL	GAZ	GEN	KSK	KAY	KOC	KON	AGÜ	SAR	TRA
Altay		0–0	2–2	2–3	1–3	0–1	1–0	5–0	2–0	2–1	3–0	1–2	2–1	1–0	0–0	1–3
Aydınspor	0–1		0–0	1–1	0–1	0–2	1–3	0–0	3–2	1–0	1–1	0–6	2–1	2–0	2–0	1–1
Bakırköyspor	1–0	1–1		3–6	2–1	1–3	0–1	0–0	3–2	1–2	0–0	3–4	5–0	1–2	3–1	0–3
Beşiktaş	1–0	2–0	1–0		3–1	2–0	1–3	2–0	3–1	1–1	1–0	4–1	7–0	4–0	4–0	1–2
Bursaspor	4–0	1–0	3–0	0–3		2–1	1–3	4–0	3–2	0–1	1–0	0–2	1–1	1–1	1–0	0–0
Fenerbahçe	3–1	1–1	4–0	1–1	4–1		1–4	1–1	3–4	7–1	3–2	4–0	5–2	1–2	0–1	0–1
Galatasaray	1–2	1–0	3–0	1–1	4–2	0–1		3–0	5–2	4–1	4–2	1–1	5–0	3–0	4–0	1–1
Gaziantepspor	1–2	5–0	1–5	0–0	1–0	2–3	0–5		4–0	1–0	2–1	0–2	6–2	1–2	3–1	1–2
Gençlerbirliği	3–2	4–1	1–0	0–0	2–2	2–2	0–3	1–0		1–1	0–4	2–3	1–0	2–0	1–0	2–2
Karşıyaka	0–1	0–2	2–1	2–1	2–2	2–3	1–2	2–3	3–0		0–1	0–4	2–1	0–0	1–1	3–2
Kayserispor	1–0	1–1	1–0	2–3	2–1	0–3	1–1	1–1	1–0	1–1		0–0	1–1	1–0	0–3	0–1
Kocaelispor	2–0	1–0	1–0	0–2	2–1	2–1	0–0	1–2	1–1	0–0	7–2		5–0	2–2	1–3	0–0
Konyaspor	2–2	5–2	1–3	2–2	1–1	1–5	0–1	1–3	1–1	2–2	0–0	1–1		2–1	0–4	0–0
MKE Ankaragücü	2–0	4–0	1–0	0–6	0–1	0–4	0–8	2–0	0–2	0–5	0–0	0–3	8–0		2–1	5–2
Sarıyer	2–0	4–1	0–1	0–1	1–3	2–4	0–0	2–0	1–1	3–0	1–0	0–1	3–0	3–5		2–2
Trabzonspor	1–0	1–0	1–0	0–0	3–0	3–4	1–0	6–2	3–1	5–0	0–0	0–1	4–1	3–1	4–0	

Source: TFF, Mackolik
Legend: Blue = home team win; Yellow = draw; Red = away team win.

== Top scorers ==
Rank	Player	Club	Goals
1	(Turkey) Tanju Çolak	Fenerbahçe	27
2	(Turkey) Feyyaz Uçar	Beşiktaş	19
2	(Turkey) Hakan Şükür	Galatasaray	19
4	(Turkey) Ergun Kula	Kocaelispor	18
5	(Turkey) Saffet Sancaklı	Kocaelispor	17
6	(Turkey) Levent Kurt	Ankaragücü	16
7	(Turkey) Hasan Çelik	Gaziantepspor	15
7	(Turkey) Zafer Tüzün	Bakırköyspor	15
9	(Turkey) Aykut Kocaman	Fenerbahçe	14
9	(Turkey) Hami Mandıralı	Trabzonspor	14
9	(Turkey) Hayrettin Aksoy	Gençlerbirliği	14
9	(Turkey) Orhan Çıkırıkçı	Trabzonspor	14

== Controversy ==
Aziz Yıldırım accused Galatasaray of introducing match-fixing to Turkey in the first place, citing as an example Galatasaray’s 8–0 victory over Ankaragücü on the final matchday. Galatasaray were crowned champions at the end of the season on goal difference.

In response, Galatasaray filed a criminal complaint against Yıldırım’s statements. Yıldırım was later acquitted in court, which, in his view, implicitly confirmed Galatasaray’s match-fixing.

Galatasaray also appealed against the court’s decision. They lodged appeals with the next higher courts (Istanbul Regional Court of Appeal and Court of Cassation), but these were all dismissed.

== Literature ==
- 2018: 1992-1993 sezonu 30 Mayıs Ankaragücü-Galatasaray maçındaki şike ve teşvik iddiaları, Bilkent University

== Weblink ==
- YouTube: Galatasaray Şike Dosyası | 1993
- Turkey - List of final Tables (RSSSF)
