= İsmail Demiriz =

Turkish footballer and manager

Personal information
- Full name: İsmail Demiriz
- Date of birth: 1 April 1962 (age 64)
- Place of birth: Turgutlu, Turkey
- Position: Right-back

Youth career
- 1979–1981: İzmirspor
- 1980: →Kocaelispor (loan)
- 1981–1982: Denizlispor
- 1982–1983: Göztepe
- 1983: →İzmirspor (loan)

Senior career*
Years	Team	Apps	(Gls)
1983–1984	Gençlerbirliği	34	(0)
1984–1993	Galatasaray	251	(7)

International career^{‡}
1980	Turkey U18	3	(0)
1982–1983	Turkey U21	5	(0)
1983–1988	Turkey	27	(0)

Managerial career
- 1995–1996: Kasımpaşa
- 1996–1997: Nişantaşıspor
- 1998: Karabükspor
- 1999–2000: Siirtspor
- * Club domestic league appearances and goals as of 3 April 2018 ‡ National team caps and goals as of 3 April 2018

İsmail Demiriz (born 1 April 1962) is a Turkish former football player, who played as a right-back, and manager.

In 2019, Demiriz was convicted in Turkey and sentenced to prison for over a half-dozen years for his affiliations with Hizmet, a self-described transnational association based on moral principles and outlawed in Turkey as allegedly an "armed terrorist group."

== Professional career ==
Demiriz spent his whole career in Turkey and is best known for his stint with Galatasaray, for whom he played 251 times and scored seven times. He helped Galatasaray win three Süper Lig titles, and ten other domestic titles. He was briefly a manager after retiring from football.

== Other interests ==
In September 2016, Demiriz was charged with being part of a Gülenist terrorist organization and detained in Istanbul.

== Honours ==
Galatasaray

- Turkish Federation Cup (2): 1984-85, 1990-91
- Prime Minister's Cup (2): 1985-86, 1989-90
- Süper Lig (3): 1986-87, 1987-88, 1992-93
- Turkish Super Cup (2): 1986-87, 1987-88
- TSYD Cup (3): 1987-88, 1991-92, 1992-93
- Turkish Cup (1): 1992-93
