= Adnan Menderes Stadium =

Stadium in Aydın, Turkey

- Interactive map of Adnan Menderes Stadium
- Former names: Aydin City Stadium
- Location: Aydın, Turkey
- Coordinates: 37°50′41″N 27°50′20″E
- Owner: Aydınspor 1923
- Capacity: 10,988
- Surface: Natural turf
- Field size: 105×68 m

Construction
- Opened: 1950
- Demolished: December 2023

Adnan Menderes Stadium was a stadium located in Aydın, Turkey. It was previously used by Aydınspor 1923.

The demolition of the stadium, which has served the city of Aydın for 73 years, started in December 2023.
