= Nezih Ali Boloğlu =

Turkish footballer

Personal information
- Date of birth: August 4, 1964 (age 62)
- Place of birth: Istanbul, Turkey
- Position: Goalkeeper

Team information
- Current team: Karabükspor (Goalkeeper Coach)

Youth career
- 1980–1983: Yeniköy Spor Kulübü

Senior career*
| Years | Team | Apps | (Gls) |
| 1983–1986 | Sarıyer | - | (-) |
| 1986–1988 | Çarşamba Spor Kulübü | - | (-) |
| 1988–1990 | Gençlerbirliği | - | (-) |
| 1990–1996 | Galatasaray | 23 | (0) |
| 1996 | → Eskişehirspor (loan) | 9 | (0) |
| 1996–1998 | Bakırköyspor | 17 | (0) |

Managerial career
- 2002–2011: Galatasaray (Goalkeeper Coach)
- 2011–: Karabükspor (Goalkeeper Coach)
- * Club domestic league appearances and goals

Nezih Ali Boloğlu (born 4 August 1964 in Istanbul) is a retired Turkish footballer. He played as a goalkeeper.

== Football career ==
After retiring as a player, Nezih joined Galatasaray's coaching staff, and worked with the goalkeepers.
