= Tanju Çolak =

Turkish footballer (born 1963)

Personal information
- Date of birth: 10 November 1963 (age 62)
- Place of birth: Samsun, Turkey
- Position: Forward

Youth career
- Samsun Yolspor

Senior career*
Years	Team	Apps	(Gls)
1982–1987	Samsunspor	157	(123)
1987–1991	Galatasaray	124	(116)
1991–1993	Fenerbahçe	54	(50)
1993–1994	İstanbulspor	19	(17)
Total		354	(306)

International career
1980–1982	Turkey U18	14	(?)
1982–1985	Turkey U21	10	(4)
1984–1991	Turkey	31	(9)
- * Club domestic league appearances and goals

Tanju Çolak (born 10 November 1963) is a Turkish former professional footballer who played as a forward.

== Club career ==
Born in Samsun, Çolak made his debut for Samsun Yolspor. From there he was transferred to Samsunspor in 1981 where he was top scorer in both the 1985–86 and 1986–87 seasons. Çolak then moved to Galatasaray at the end of 1986–87 season. He was the top scorer in Europe with 39 goals in the 1987–88 season. At the same time, he was awarded the European Golden Boot given by France Football. He is the only Turkish footballer to date to win this award. Çolak became the top scorer again in the 1990–91 season, and transferred to Fenerbahçe at the end of the season.

He had a lifetime total of 240 goals and took over the title of top goal scorer in the Turkish Super League by breaking the legendary record of Metin Oktay. He scored the most goal with 240 goals in only nine seasons, which were 1982–83 and between the 1992–93 seasons. His record was broken by Hakan Şükür in 2007–08 season after 17 seasons.

== International career ==
Çolak played for the Turkey national team, where he was capped 31 time, scoring 9 goals.

== Personal life ==
Tanju's younger brother, Yücel Çolak also was a professional footballer.

In January 1994, he began a prison sentence of four years and eight months for illegally smuggling a Mercedes-Benz car into Ankara.

He was deputy candidate of Beylikdüzü municipality for Nationalist Movement Party (Turkish: Milliyetçi Hareket Partisi, abbreviated MHP) in 2009, but wasn't elected.

He was a Justice and Development Party (Turkish: Adalet ve Kalkınma Partisi, abbreviated AKP) candidate to the Turkish Parliament elections which was held in 12 June, 2011

== Honours ==
Galatasaray

- Süper Lig: 1987–88
- Turkish Cup: 1990–91
- Turkish Super Cup: 1988

Individual

- Süper Lig top scorer: 1985–86, 1986–87, 1987–88, 1990–91, 1992–93
- European Golden Boot: 1987–88 (winner), 1990–91 (runner up)
- IFFHS Legends

== Other career achievements ==
- Lifetime goal total (240 in 252 matches) which was a Turkish league record for highest goals scored by a single player in the league. On 3 September 2007, this record was broken by Hakan Şükür.
- Most goals in a season (39 in 1987–1988 at Galatasaray);
- Most goals in a match (6 in 1992–1993 at Fenerbahçe);
- 5 times top league scorer (1985–1986, 1986–1987, at Samsunspor – 1987–1988, 1990–1991 at Galatasaray – 1992–1993 at Fenerbahçe);
- European top scorer 3rd place (33 goals in 1985–1986 at Samsunspor);
- European top scorer 1st place (39 goals in 1987–1988 at Galatasaray);
- European top scorer 2nd place (31 goals in 1990–1991 at Galatasaray).
