= Mert Korkmaz =

Turkish footballer

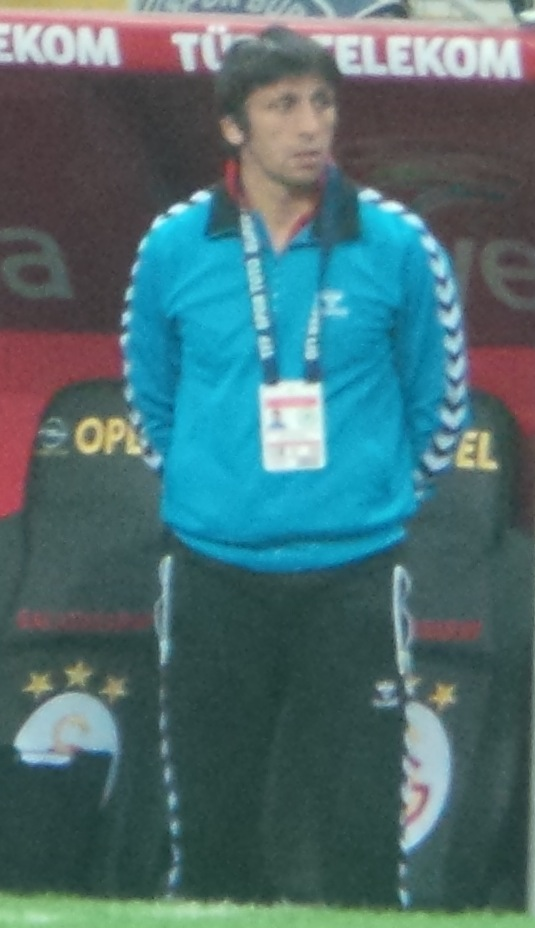

Personal information
- Full name: Mert Zeki Korkmaz
- Date of birth: 16 August 1971 (age 55)
- Place of birth: Istanbul, Turkey
- Height: 1.88 m (6 ft 2 in)
- Position: Defender

Youth career
- 1987–1993: Galatasaray A2

Senior career*
Years	Team	Apps	(Gls)
1992–1997	Galatasaray	89	(1)
1997–1999	Kocaelispor	74	(2)
1999–2002	Gaziantepspor	66	(5)
2002–2006	Malatyaspor	142	(12)
2006–2008	İstanbul BB	48	(5)

International career
1998–2000	Turkey	5	(0)
- * Club domestic league appearances and goals

Mert Zeki Korkmaz (born 16 August 1971) is a retired Turkish footballer.

== Early life ==
Korkmaz was born in 1971. He is the younger brother of Bülent Korkmaz, a football player.

== Career ==
Korkmaz played as a defender, and was known for his fighting spirit and professional approach to the game.

A product of Galatasaray S.K.'s youth system, Mert played there from 1993 to 1997. He went on to represent Kocaelispor, Gaziantepspor, Malatyaspor and İstanbul Büyükşehir Belediyespor, retiring in 2008.

Korkmaz was capped five times by Turkey.

Following his retirement, Korkmaz began to work as a football manager for İstanbul Büyükşehir Belediyespor. He was assistant coach of Kocaelispor, Kasımpaşa, Konyaspor ve Ümraniyespor. Next he served as the coach of Yeni Malatyaspor, Tarsus İdman Yurdu ve Nevşehir Belediyespor.
