= Serhat Güller =

Turkish footballer and manager

Personal information
- Date of birth: 18 December 1968 (age 57)
- Place of birth: Eskişehir, Turkey
- Position: Defender

Senior career*
Years	Team	Apps	(Gls)
1987–1989	İnegölspor	?	(?)
1989–1990	Galatasaray	?	(?)
1990–1995	Ankaragücü	138	(6)
1995–1996	Karşıyaka	30	(2)
1996–1998	Karabükspor	66	(1)
1998–2000	Yozgatspor	48	(1)
2000–2001	Hatayspor	11	(0)

International career
1989	Turkey U-21	5	(0)
1991	Turkey Olympic	5	(0)
1992–1993	Turkey	9	(0)

Managerial career
- 2002: Şekerspor (assistant)
- 2002–2003: Kızılcahamam (assistant)
- 2003–2004: Kızılcahamam
- 2004: Kayserispor (assistant)
- 2005–2006: Büyükşehir Belediyespor (assistant)
- 2006–2007: İnegölspor
- 2007–2009: Boluspor
- 2009–2010: Mersin İdmanyurdu
- 2011: Denizlispor
- 2011–2012: Körfezspor
- 2012: Boluspor
- 2014–2015: Altay
- 2015: İnegölspor
- 2017–2018: Pendikspor
- 2018–2019: Afyonspor
- * Club domestic league appearances and goals

Serhat Güller (born 18 December 1968) is a Turkish football manager and a former player.

== Playing career ==
Serhat Güller started his professional player career in İnegölspor in 1987. In 1989, he received the attention of Galatasaray. However, he can be mostly named together with Ankaragücü where he played 5 seasons during which he was capped 9 times to national team.

=== League appearances ===
Season, team, appearances, goals, yellow cards, red cards. İncludes only domestic matches.

- (1987–89) İnegölspor
- (1989–90) Galatasaray
- (1990–95) MKE Ankaragücü 138(6), yel:24, red:1 (He was loaned in 1990-91 season)
- (1995–96) Karşıyaka 30(2+1 o.g), yel:3, red:1
- (1996–98) KDÇ Karabükspor 66(1), yel: 12, red:1
- (1998-00) Yimpaş Yozgatspor 48(1), yel: 9, red:0
- (2000–01) Hatayspor 11(0), yel:3, red:0

total goal: 10, own goal: 2, total yel: 51, total red: 3

=== National team appearances ===
He appeared in national team in Sepp Piontek period, against Norway in April 1993 when the team lost the game 3-1; in 0-0 ended San Marino game; and, 0-1 lost Germany game (friendly game). Under Piontek's management the national team was not successful, but after that period could catch a take-off. Among his teammates were Hakan Şükür, Bülent Korkmaz, Aykut Kocaman, and Ünal Karaman and many other famous players of the time.

- National team (A): 9 (1992–93);
- Olympic national team: 4 (1991);
- U-21 national team: 5 (1989).

=== General player statistics ===
caps(goals)

- Turkey Cup: 20(1)
- Turkcell Süper Lig: 185(9)
- Official Cups: 4(0)
- Friendly Matches: 2(1)
- World Cup elimination: 2(0)
- Chancellor Cup: 1(0)
- European Championship: 4(0)
- Second League: 91(2)

== Manager career ==
Serhat Güller has started his managing career in İnegölspor too. He managed Boluspor two seasons. Lastly he managed Mersin İdmanyurdu. Mersin İdmanyurdu was new in the Bank Asya 1. Lig, therefore he made extensive amount of transfers, to which many have followed in winter period. He managed the team for 20 games; and received 7 wins, 2 draws and 11 losses. He left the team when it was 13th place.

Team, season, task

- Etimesgut Şekerspor (2002), trainer
- Kızılcahamam Belediyespor (2002–2004), trainer, then manager
- Kayserispor (2004–2005), trainer
- İstanbul BŞB (2005–06), trainer
- İnegölspor (2006–07), manager
- Boluspor (2007–09), manager
- Mersin İdmanyurdu (2009–10), manager
- Denizlispor (2011), manager
- Körfez FK (2011–present), manager
