= Yücel Çolak =

Turkish footballer and manager

Personal information
- Full name: Yücel Çolak
- Date of birth: November 13, 1968 (age 57)
- Place of birth: Samsun, Turkey
- Position: Forward

Youth career
- 1984–1986: Samsunspor

Senior career*
Years	Team	Apps	(Gls)
1986–1988	Samsunspor	40	(29)
1988–1990	Sakaryaspor	54	(19)
1990–1991	Galatasaray	0	(0)
1990–1991	→ Çengelköy SK (loan)	26	(0)
1991–1993	Mersin İdmanyurdu	64	(36)
1993–1994	Yeni Sincanspor	27	(15)
1994–1995	Büyükşehir Belediye Erzurumspor	31	(19)
1995–1996	Sarıyer S.K.	19	(6)
1996–1997	Kartal S.K.	27	(13)
1997	Turanspor	10	(1)
1997–1998	Göztepe S.K.	20	(11)
1998	İzmirspor	11	(6)
1998–1999	Siirtspor	18	(26)
1999–2000	Ispartaspor	17	(10)
2000–2001	Gaziosmanpaşaspor	63	(35)

International career^{‡}
1984–1985	Turkey U16	6	(0)
1985–1986	Turkey U18	7	(0)
1987–1989	Turkey U21	8	(4)
1988	Turkey Olympic	4	(0)

Managerial career
- 2006: MKE Ankaragücü (assistant manager)
- 2011–2012: Siirtspor
- 2013–2014: Üsküdar Anadolu S.K.
- 2015–2016: Istanbul Maltepespor
- 2017: Çengelköyspor
- * Club domestic league appearances and goals as of 9 November 2017 ‡ National team caps and goals as of 9 November 2017

Yücel Çolak (born 13 November 1968 in Samsun) is a Turkish football manager, and a retired footballer who played as a forward in the Turkish Süper Lig, as well as the lower divisions of Turkey.

== Professional career ==
A journeyman striker, Yücel began his career in his hometown of Samsun representing Samsunspor. He very briefly transferred to Galatasaray and made one appearance for them at the TSYD Cup on 12 August 1990. Prolific in the lower divisions, Yücel was top scorer with Mersin İdmanyurdu in the 1991–1992 season of the TFF Second League.

== Personal life ==
Yücel is the brother of the footballer Tanju Çolak.
