= Hasan Vezir =

Turkish football player and manager (born 1962)

Personal information
- Date of birth: 7 September 1962 (age 64)
- Place of birth: Rize
- Position: Striker

Senior career*
Years	Team	Apps	(Gls)
1981–1983	Çaykur Rizespor		
1983–1987	Trabzonspor	113	(25)
1987–1988	Çaykur Rizespor	40	(16)
1988–1989	→ Fenerbahçe (loan)	23	(15)
1989–1991	Galatasaray	51	(16)
1991–1994	Bakırköyspor	54	(14)
1994–1995	Adanaspor	21	(11)
1995–1997	Karabükspor	26	(11)
1997–1998	Kartalspor	16	(6)
1998–1999	Üsküdar Anadolu SK	17	(5)

International career
1984–1985	Turkey U21	4	(0)
1984–1989	Turkey	15	(0)

Managerial career
- 2000–2001: Kardemir Karabükspor (assistant)
- 2001–2002: Kardemir Karabükspor
- 2002–2003: Çorluspor
- 2003–2004: Kasımpaşa
- 2005: Pazarspor
- 2006–2007: Kastamonuspor
- 2007–2008: Maltepespor
- 2009: Çaykur Rizespor (assistant)
- 2010–2011: Ofspor
- 2012–2013: Elazığ Belediyespor
- 2013–2014: Çıksalınspor
- 2015: Ofspor
- 2015–2016: Cizrespor
- * Club domestic league appearances and goals

Hasan Vezir (born 7 September 1962) is a Turkish football manager and former player.

== Club career ==
Started his career at Çaykur Rizespor of his hometown, he joined Trabzonspor in 1983, where he played for four seasons before returning Rizespor, due to paternal pressure. Attracted the Big Three with his performances, joined Fenerbahçe on loan in 1988–89 season, scoring 19 goals, Vezir had a major contribution for Fenerbahçe's most scoring season, which is an unbroken record of Süper Lig, as of 2014.

Following his spells in Fenerbahçe and Galatasaray, respectively, he spent rest of his career as a journeyman, played for four teams in eight seasons until 1999.

Vezir is one of 42 footballers played in Kıtalararası Derbi both under Fenerbahçe and Galatasaray jersey. He represented Turkey at U-21 and senior levels between 1984 and 1989, earned 19 caps (15 at seniors), being a part of the squad at Euro 1998 and 1990 World Cup qualifying stages, however, he was never able to score for the team.

== International career ==
Vezir earned four caps for Turkey U21 national team between 1984 and 1985. He competed at 1986 UEFA European Under-21 Championship qualifying stage, played three matches up against Finland, England and, Romania, with two draws and one defeat. He also took a part of a friendly game with Albania on 27 March 1985.

== Career statistics ==
Appearances and goals by national team and year
National team	Year	Apps	Goals
Turkey	1985	5	0
Turkey	1986	2	0
Turkey	1987	3	0
Turkey	1989	2	0
Turkey	1989	3	0
Total		15	0

== Honours ==
Trabzonspor

- 1. Lig: 1983–84
- Turkish Cup: 1984; runner-up: 1985
- Chancellor Cup: 1985

Fenerbahçe

- 1. Lig: 1988–89

Galatasaray

- Chancellor Cup: 1990
- Turkish Federation Cup: 1991
