= Mustafa Yücedağ =

Turkish footballer (1966–2020)

Personal information
- Date of birth: 25 April 1966
- Place of birth: Gaziantep, Turkey
- Date of death: 17 February 2020 (aged 53)
- Place of death: Zaandam, Netherlands
- Position: Midfielder

Senior career*
Years	Team	Apps	(Gls)
1985–1986	Ajax	1	(0)
1986–1988	PEC Zwolle	39	(7)
1988–1990	Sarıyer	55	(16)
1990–1992	Galatasaray	48	(1)
1992	Fenerbahçe	2	(0)
1992–1993	Sarıyer	14	(4)
1993–1994	De Graafschap	5	(0)
1994	Gaziantepspor	3	(0)
1994–1995	Sarıyer	8	(0)
Total		175	(38)

International career
1988–1990	Turkey	9	(0)
- * Club domestic league appearances and goals

Mustafa Yücedağ (25 April 1966 – 17 February 2020) was a Turkish footballer who played as a midfielder.

== Career ==
Born in Gaziantep, Yücedağ moved to the Netherlands with his family at an early age. He played football for Ajax, PEC Zwolle and De Graafschap, as well as in his native Turkey for Sarıyer, Galatasaray, Fenerbahçe and Gaziantepspor.

He also capped nine times for the Turkey national team between 1988 and 1990, including four FIFA World Cup qualifying matches.

== After football ==
On 5 July 2010, Yücedağ was appointed by his former team Galatasaray to act as the assistant coach and interpreter for Frank Rijkaard.

== Death ==
On 17 February 2020, Yücedağ died as a result of heart attack at his home in Zaandam, North Holland.
