= Aydınspor 1923 =

Turkish sports club

- Full name: Aydınspor 1923
- Nickname: Zeybekler
- Founded: 1966, re-constituted in 2009
- Ground: Aydın Field Number 1, Aydın
- Chairman: Süha Bayırlı
- Manager: Mustafa Ceviz
- League: Turkish Amateur Football Leagues
Home colours	Away colours

Aydınspor 1923 is a Turkish sports club based in Aydın. The football club plays in the Turkish Amateur Football Leagues. The club's former name was "Aydın Belediyespor" (founded after taking over Çine Topçamspor in 1993) before 2011 and former colours were blue-white. Aydınspor 1923 became first team of city of Aydın after demise of Aydınspor, was founded in 1923 and became professional in 1966, after relegation to amateur level in 2009. Aydınspor finally withdrew from Aydın Super Amateur League in 2011. Aydınspor returned to Aydın 5th Group of 2nd Amateur League in 2014 and promoted to 1st Amateur League. They finished 4th Group of 1st Amateur League as 3rd in 2015. They finished 3rd Group of one as champions and returned to Aydın Super Amateur League in 2015–16 season.

== League participations (as Aydınspor) ==
- Turkish Super League: 1990–93
- TFF First League: 1966–84, 1985–90, 1993–02
- TFF Second League: 2002–06
- TFF Third League: 1984–85, 2006–09
- Amatör Futbol Ligleri: 2009–

== League participations (as Aydınspor 1923) ==
- TFF Second League: 2013–17
- TFF Third League: 2011–13
- Turkish Regional Amateur League: 2018–19
- Amatör Futbol Ligleri: 2010–11, 2019–

== Former coaches (For Aydınspor) ==
- (Turkey) Necdet Zorluer
- (Turkey) Tevfik Ata Tekin
