= List of Beşiktaş J.K. honors =

Beşiktaş in international football
- Club: Beşiktaş J.K.

Titles
- Intercontinental Cup: 3: 1950; 1952; 2015

Below is list of achievements of, and records and trophies won by Beşiktaş J.K.

== Championships ==
=== League championships (Regional and all tiers Included) ===
- Turkish Super League
  - Winners (16): 1956–57, 1957–58, 1959–60, 1965–66, 1966–67, 1981–82, 1985–86, 1989–90, 1990–91, 1991–92, 1994–95, 2002–03, 2008–09, 2015–16, 2016–17, 2020–21
  - Runners-up (14): 1962–63, 1963–64, 1964–65, 1967–68, 1973–74, 1983–84, 1986–87, 1987–88, 1988–89, 1992–93, 1996–97, 1998–99, 1999–2000, 2006–07
  - Third Place (14): 1960–1961, 1961–1962, 1968–1969, 1995–1996, 2001–2002, 2003–2004, 2005–2006, 2007–2008, 2012–2013, 2013–2014, 2014–2015, 2018–2019, 2019–2020, 2022–2023
- Turkish National Division
  - Winners (3): 1941, 1944, 1947
  - Runners-up (3): 1938, 1945, 1946
- Turkish Football Championship
  - Winners (2): 1934, 1951
  - Runners-up (2): 1941, 1946
- Istanbul Football League (Record)
  - Winners (13): 1923–24, 1933–34, 1938–39, 1939–40, 1940–41, 1941–42, 1942–43, 1944–45, 1945–46, 1949–50, 1950–51, 1951–52, 1953–54
  - Runners-up (6): 1933, 1944, 1948, 1949, 1953, 1955

=== Domestic cups (regional, friendly and all tiers included) ===
- Turkish Cup
  - Winners (11): 1975, 1989, 1990, 1994, 1998, 2006, 2007, 2009, 2011, 2021, 2024
  - Runners-up (6): 1966, 1977, 1984, 1993, 1999, 2002
- Turkish Super Cup
  - Winners (3): 2006, 2021, 2024
  - Runners-up (4): 2007, 2009, 2016, 2017
- Turkish Presidents Cup
  - Winners (7): 1967, 1974, 1986, 1989, 1992, 1994, 1998
  - Runners-up (7): 1966, 1975, 1977, 1990, 1991, 1993, 1995
- Chancellor Cup
  - Winners (6): 1944, 1947, 1974, 1977, 1988, 1997
  - Runners-up (1): 1996
- TSYD Cup (Shared Record)
  - Winners (12): 1965, 1966, 1972, 1973, 1975, 1984, 1985, 1989, 1990, 1991, 1994, 1997
- Atatürk Cup
  - Winners (1): 2000
  - Runners-up (2): 1964, 1998
- Istanbul Cup (Shared Record)
  - Winners (2): 1944, 1946
- Istanbul Shield
  - Winners (1): 1935
- Turkish Federation Cup (Record)
  - Winners (2): 1956, 1957
- Spor-Toto Cup (Record)
  - Winners (4): 1966, 1968, 1969, 1970
- Fleet Cup
  - Winners (1): 1986
- Istanbul SİD Cup
  - Winners (1): 1935
- Aviation Cup
  - Winners (1): 1938
- İzmir Fair Cup
  - Winners (1): 1943
- Police Association Cup
  - Winners (1): 1982
- Ali Sami Yen-Şeref Bey Cup
  - Winners (1): 1963
- Alpen Cup (Record)
  - Winners (1): 2004
- Efes Pilsen Cup (Shared Record)
  - Winners (1): 2006
- Soma Cup
  - Winners (1): 2014
- Uluslararası Antalya Gazi Kupası (Record)
  - Winners (2): 2003, 2005
- USA Cup / Intercontinental Cup
  - Winners (1): 1950
- Brazil Cup / Intercontinental Cup
  - Winners (1): 1952
- International Royal Cup / Intercontinental Cup
  - Winners (1): 2015

== League participation ==
- Istanbul Sports League: 1920, 1921
- Istanbul Football League: 1924, 1925, 1926, 1927, 1928, 1929, 1930, 1931, 1932, 1933, 1934, 1935, 1936, 1937, 1938, 1939, 1940, 1941, 1942, 1943, 1944, 1946, 1947, 1948, 1949, 1950, 1951, 1952, 1953, 1954, 1955, 1956, 1957, 1958, 1959
- National League 1937, 1938, 1939, 1940, 1941, 1943, 1944, 1945, 1946, 1947, 1950
- Turkish First Football League: 1957, 1958, 1959, 1960, 1961, 1962, 1963, 1964, 1965, 1966, 1967, 1968, 1969, 1970, 1971, 1972, 1973, 1973, 1974, 1975, 1976, 1977, 1978, 1979, 1980, 1981, 1982, 1983, 1984, 1985, 1986, 1987, 1988, 1989, 1990, 1991, 1992, 1993, 1994, 1995, 1996, 1997, 1998, 1999, 2000, 2001, 2002, 2003, 2004, 2005, 2006, 2007, 2008, 2009, 2010, 2011, 2012, 2013, 2014, 2015, 2016, 2017, 2018,2019,2020
- UEFA Champions League: 1958*, 1959, 1961, 1967, 1968, 1983, 1987, 1991, 1992, 1993, 1996, 2004, 2008, 2010, 2017, 2018, 2022

== European achievements ==
#	Club	Played	Won	Drew	Lost	GF	GA	GD	Win%	Points	First Appearance	Last Appearance	Reference
1	Galatasaray	271	98	71	102	370	404	−34	36.16	365	1956–57 EC	2017–18 UEL	
2	Fenerbahçe	220	81	45	94	274	326	−52	36.82	288	1959–60 EC	2017–18 UEL	
3	Beşiktaş	201	76	44	81	262	285	−23	37.81	272	1958–59 EC	2017–18 UCL	
4	Trabzonspor	125	48	32	45	162	166	−4	38.40	176	1976–77 EC	2015–16 UEL	
5	Bursaspor	32	10	9	13	41	50	−9	31.25	39	1974–75 CWC	2014–15 UEL	

Pos. = Position; Pld = Matches played; W = Won; D = Drawn; L = Lost; GF = Goals for; GA = Goals against; Pa. = Participation; Pld = Matches played
SCUP = UEFA Super Cup; ECCC / UCL = European Champion Clubs' Cup / UEFA Champions League; UCWC = UEFA Cup Winners' Cup;
UCUP = UEFA Cup (including Inter-Cities Fairs Cup); UIC = UEFA Intertoto Cup

=== Best campaigns ===
Season	Achievement	Notes
European Cup / UEFA Champions League
1986–87	Quarter-finals	eliminated by Dynamo Kyiv 0–2 in İzmir, 0–5 in Kyiv
European Cup Winners' Cup
1993–94	Last 16	eliminated by Ajax 1–2 in Amsterdam, 0–4 in Istanbul
1994–95	Last 16	eliminated by Auxerre 2–2 in Istanbul, 0–2 in Auxerre
1998–99	Last 16	eliminated by Vålerenga 0–1 in Oslo, 3–3 in Istanbul
UEFA Cup / UEFA Europa League
2002–03	Quarter-finals	eliminated by Lazio 0–1 in Rome, 1–2 in Istanbul
2016–17	Quarter-finals	eliminated by Olympique Lyonnais 1–2 in Lyon, 2–1 in regular time and 6–7 on penalties in Istanbul

== Records and statistics ==
=== Records ===
- Only club to win the Istanbul Football League five consecutive seasons (1939–1943).
- Most goals scored in Istanbul League, 90 goals in a season, 599 in 8 seasons.
- Only team to start the season with 13 straight wins.
- The only undefeated champion of the Turkish Super League (1992).
- Most games consecutively won (18).
- First club to win the Turkish Super Cup (1–0 against Galatasaray).
- Biggest win ever in the Turkish Super League (10–0 against Adana Demirspor).

=== Statistics ===
- Biggest win: Beşiktaş 10–0 Adana Demirspor
- Biggest loss: Liverpool 8–0 Beşiktaş
- First International match: Real Madrid 2–0 Beşiktaş

== Achievements ==
Major achievements listed by official club website:

- The only undefeated winner of the Süper Lig (1991–92 season)
- Biggest win ever in the Süper Lig against Adana Demirspor with 10–0 during the 1989–90 season. Goals by Ali Gültiken (4), Metin Tekin (3) ve Feyyaz Uçar (3)
- Longest streak of undefeated games in the Süper Lig with 56 games, hence the nickname Yenilmez Armada (Invincible Armada)
- 10 seasons unbeaten at home against teams from outside of Istanbul in the Süper Lig (with the exception of rival Istanbul teams Fenerbahçe and Galatasaray)
- Most games consecutively won by a club in the Süper Lig with 18 games
- Won 5 consecutive Istanbul League titles (1939–1943)
- Most goals scored in the Istanbul League, 90 goals in a season, 599 in 8 seasons
- First winner of the Turkish Super Cup in 2006 against Galatasaray, 1–0
- The record away win in a UEFA competition match in the club's history was against FK Olimpik Sarajevo with 0–5 during the 2002–03 UEFA Cup
- The most successful team of 1950 and 1952 Beşiktaş with the American and Brazilian Cups
- Beşiktaş is among the teams that have won the most Intercontinental Cups in the world with a total of 3 cups.
- Most winner of the Istanbul Football League title (15)
- Only club to win the Istanbul Football League title 5 consecutive seasons (1939–1943)
- The first champion of US by a European team and only club in Turkey in 1950
- The first clubs to win to Intercontinental Cup in 1950
- The first clubs to beating Brazilian Club cup victory in 1952 from Turkish club
- Most successful club of 1950 and 1952 with USA and Brazil Cups
- Most goals scored in Istanbul League history (90 Goals in a season, 599 Goals in 8 seasons)
- Highest number of undefeated titles (7)
- Only team that won the Turkish National League Championship with a perfect record
- Only team selected to represent the Turkey national football team
- Only team to carry a Turkish Flag on its Emblem
- Most winner of the ‘Fair-Play’ Cup (19)
- Most winner of the Istanbul and Turkish titles in the youth leagues (30)
- Only football club with a title in fencing (Balkan Championship)
- Only Turkish club to help legitimize Commemoration of Atatürk, Youth and Sports Day
- Only club that introduced Greco-Roman wrestling to other clubs in Turkey
- Only Turkish club that have titles in athletics, fencing, boxing, basketball, wrestling and football.
- Only club that introduced pole vault to Turkey (Painter Namik Ismail)
- The club that teach physical education at schools
- Owner of Turkey's greatest sports facilities
- Only club with “sports schools” in almost every sports section
- The team that has raised the highest number of talented players from their youth organization
- Only team with a 56-match unbeaten streak
- Most consecutive wins in football tournaments (18)
- The team that posted only one loss in two seasons
- Biggest defeat in UEFA Champions League history against Liverpool F.C., 8–0; in the group stage 2007-08.
- The team with the longest unbeaten streak in league history (48 matches). After losing 2–0 to Gençlerbirliği in Week 26 of the 1991–92 season, the Black and White's did not lose a match until a 3–1 setback against Galatasaray in Week 13 of the following season, a span of 48 weeks.
- Most consecutive wins in National Football League Championship (13) (1959–60)
- In comparison to other clubs, which mostly have ISO 9001:1994, Beşiktaş is the first Turkish sports club to receive ISO 9001: 2000 certification through highly efficient sports departments and facilities management, advanced marketing and selling of club products and modern press, public and fan communications services.
