= Süleyman Seba =

Turkish football player and sport executive (1926–2014)

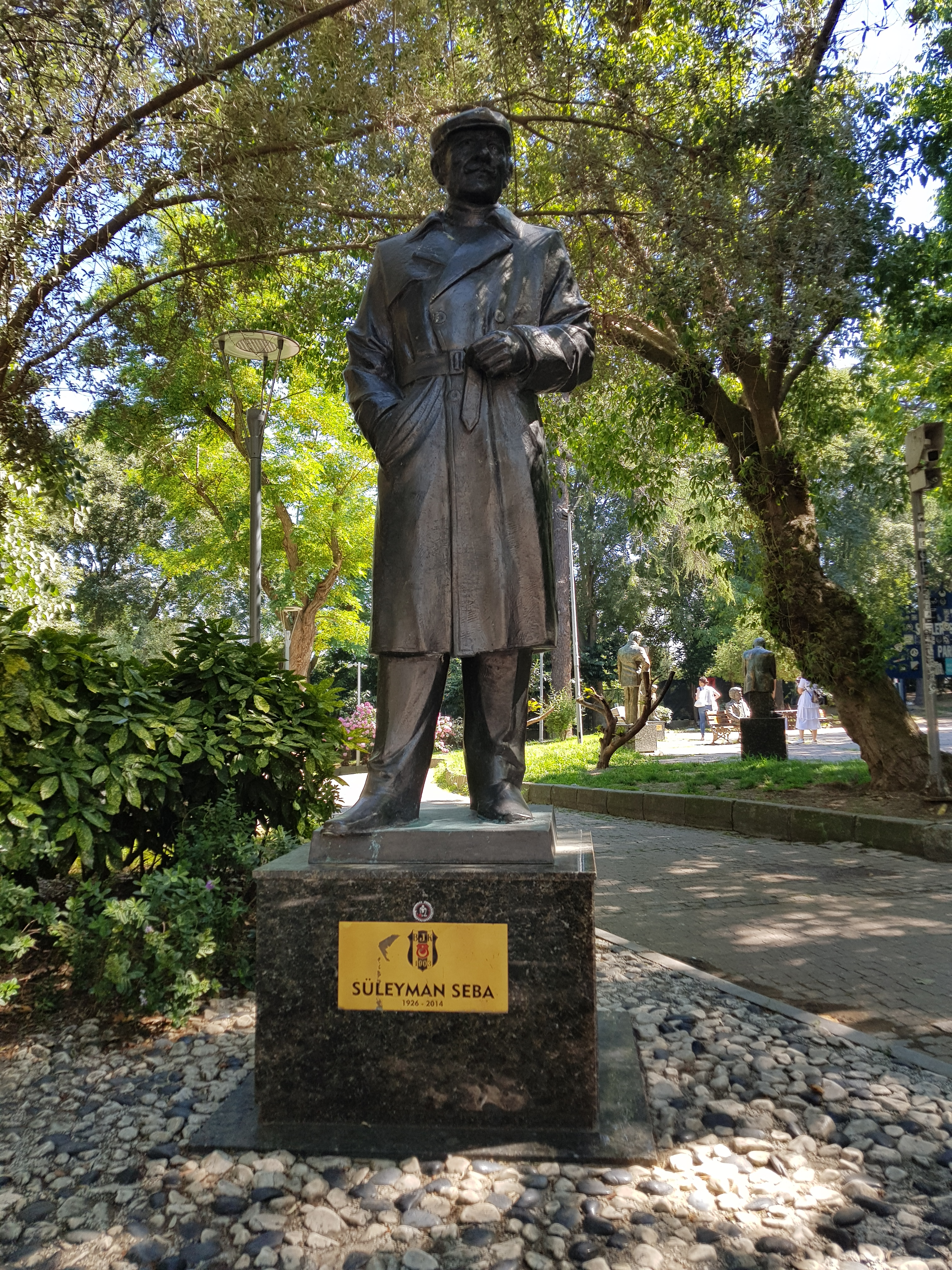
- Statue of Süleyman Seba in Şairler Sofası Park, Beşiktaş, Istanbul, 2020
- Born: Süleyman Seba; 5 April 1926; Soğuksulu, Sakarya, Turkey
- Died: 13 August 2014 (aged 88); Istanbul, Turkey
- Resting place: Feriköy Cemetery, Istanbul
- Occupations: Footballer, sports executive
Association football career
- Position: Winger
Senior career*
Years	Team	Apps	(Gls)
1946–1953	Beşiktaş	87	(22)
Total		88	(22)
International career^{‡}
1952	Turkey U21	1	(0)
- * Club domestic league appearances and goals as of 10:00, 6 February 2015 (UTC) ‡ National team caps and goals as of 10:00, 6 February 2015 (UTC)

Süleyman Seba (Abkhaz: Шәлиман Цыба, romanized: Ša̋liman Cyba; 5 April 1926 – 13 August 2014) was a Turkish football player of Abkhazian origin and was the longest presiding chairman of the Istanbul-based multisports club Beşiktaş (Beşiktaş Jimnastik Kulübü). He was also a chief intelligence officer for the National Intelligence Organization in "the mission of countering communism".

Süleyman Seba is one of the two honorary presidents of Beşiktaş, along with Hakkı Yeten.

== Biography ==
=== Early life ===
Süleyman Seba was born on 5 April 1926 in Soğuksulu, a village in the Sakarya Province of Turkey. Seba family moved to Akaretler district in Beşiktaş, Istanbul, when Süleyman Seba was five or six years old. Although most sources say that Seba attended the prestigious Galatasaray High School in the Beyoğlu district for a while, some other sources say that this was just a plan. After finishing elementary school in Beşiktaş in 1938, Seba went to Kabataş High School on the Bosphorus, another prestigious historic Turkish high school in the Beşiktaş district. He selected this school due to its proximity to the training fields of the local football club Beşiktaş.

Seba later enrolled in Mimar Sinan University's Faculty of Literature to study French philology, but because of his football career he never graduated. He also tried to obtain a degree in geography but he couldn't attend the exams when Beşiktaş was invited to play some friendlies in the United States.

=== Football player ===
Seba started to play football in the Kabataş High School team. The promising player was soon discovered by the local football club Beşiktaş and admitted to its junior team. With his contribution, the junior team became the champions of that season, and Seba was promoted to the rank of team captain a short time later. In 1946, he was called to become a member of the A-team.

Seba scored 19 Istanbul Football League goals in 70 matches between 1946 and 1953. He also played in 17 Milli Küme Şampiyonası matches and scored three goals. He won one Turkish title at the end of his first professional season for Beşiktaş in 1947. He also won three Istanbul titles. In 1950, Süleyman Seba joined the Beşiktaş squad that went to the US to play some friendly matches. They played against American Soccer League all-stars, some regional all-star teams and Manchester United. It is rumoured that Manchester United wanted to sign Seba after the match.

Seba went down in Turkish football history when he scored the first ever goal at the BJK İnönü Stadium against the Swedish side AIK during the inaugural match of the venue in 1947. The match was played as the first match of AIK's tour in Turkey. Seba scored the first goal in the stadium on the 40th minute. In one of his last interviews, he described the goal, saying: "Faruk [Sağnak] kicked the ball from the left side to me. Then, I stopped the ball. Presumably, I faked two footballers and I scored the goal like that". AIK won that match 3–2.

In 1954, he was forced to retire from his career as a footballer due to a meniscus injury. During his entire professional career, he played only for Beşiktaş.

=== International career ===
Seba was never called up to the Turkey national team; however, he was given the opportunity to play for Turkey national under-21 football team. Initially, Turkish Football Federation gave Beşiktaş (then-champions of Istanbul Football League) the permission to represent the Turkish side in the Turkey's last match in the East Mediterranean Cup 1950–1953 against Greece national football team. Although the squad was strengthened by some additions from Galatasaray and Fenerbahçe, Beşiktaş obtained the right to use the Turkish flag in their emblem, and it is still being used by the club today.

Süleyman Seba was among the players who were selected to play against Greece. On 16 May 1952, he played his first and only game where Turkey lost 0–1.

=== Career after retiring from football ===
There is not much information on Seba's years after retiring from active sports. However, it is known that he served for some time in the Turkish National Intelligence Organization (MIT) and rose to the rank of colonel.

=== Club president ===
In 1957, Seba became an active member of Beşiktaş.

Six years later, in 1963, he became a member of the club's Presidential Council.

In 1984, Seba took the helm of the club, gaining more votes in the presidential election than Mehmet Üstünkaya, who was the club president between 1981 and 1984. The election was held on April 1, 1984. Seba got the support of 403 members whereas Üstünkaya obtained the support of 338 members. During this election Seba received the support of the all-time Beşiktaş legend "Baba" (Father) Hakkı Yeten.

In his first full season, he hired Branko Stanković as the new manager of the team, tried to solve the debt issues of the clubs, and started to invest in club's facilities. Beşiktaş lost the league championship on goal difference but Seba decided to continue with Stanković. In January 1986, Beşiktaş won the Fleet Cup, which was the first official trophy that was won during the Seba presidency. On 23 February 1986, Seba was elected again and his second term started. At the end of 1985–86 season, Stanković's Beşiktaş won the Turkish Super League championship on goal difference. The championship was won for the first time in four years. Beşiktaş closed the season by winning the Presidential Cup as well.

During Seba's era, Beşiktaş became the dominant team in Turkey, and in the 1986–1987 season reached the quarter-finals of the European Champion Clubs' Cup (known as the UEFA Champions League today), but lost to Dynamo Kyiv. When Seba brought in British coach Gordon Milne, no one knew that Beşiktaş was set for years of dominance in the Turkish Super League. With a strong team of young players like "Atom Karınca" (Atom Ant) Rıza Çalımbay (team captain), Feyyaz Uçar, "Sarı Fırtına" (Blonde Storm) Metin Tekin, Ali Gültiken, Gökhan Keskin, Mehmet Özdilek and Sergen Yalçın, Beşiktaş won three League titles in a row between 1989 and 1992. Beşiktaş later became the League Champions in 1994–1995, but then went on for years to finish behind Fatih Terim's Galatasaray.

Seba went on for a 16-year presidency as club chairman of Beşiktaş. He worked with several world famous trainers like Christoph Daum, John Benjamin Toshack, and Karl Heinz Feldkamp. In 1998, he was elected as the chairman one more time and he announced that this was going to his final term. He was elected as the honorary chairman in the next financial congress in February 2000. Although he declared his support for Hasan Arat in the next chairman elections, Serdar Bilgili was elected on 27 March 2000 and became his successor.

During his retirement, Seba served as Beşiktaş’s honorary chairman. During his presidency, the club’s financial position improved after he took office in 1984.

== Death ==
Seba died on August 13, 2014. He was laid to rest at the Feriköy Cemetery, Istanbul.

== Honours ==
The famous historic avenue in the Akaretler quarter of Beşiktaş, where the club's HQ is located, has been renamed as Süleyman Seba Avenue in his honour.

The 2014–15 season of the Süper Lig, which began less than a month after Seba's death, was officially dedicated to him by the Turkish Football Federation.

== Trophies won by club during presidency ==
- Süper Lig (5):
  - 1985–86, 1989–90, 1990–91, 1991–92, 1994–95
- Turkish Cup (4):
  - 1989, 1990, 1994, 1998
- Turkish Presidents Cup (5)
  - 1986, 1989, 1992, 1994, 1998
- Chancellor Cup (2):
  - 1988, 1997
- Fleet Cup (1):
  - 1986
- TSYD Cup (6):
  - 1985, 1989, 1990, 1991, 1994, 1997

== See also ==
- List of one-club men

== Bibliography ==
- Akar, Rıdvan (2014). Beşiktaş'ın Dervişi Süleyman Seba (in Turkish). Chiviyazıları Yayınevi. ISBN 9786055708993.

Sporting positions
Preceded by Mehmet Üstünkaya	President of Beşiktaş JK; 1984–2000	Succeeded by Serdar Bilgili
