= List of Beşiktaş J.K. seasons =

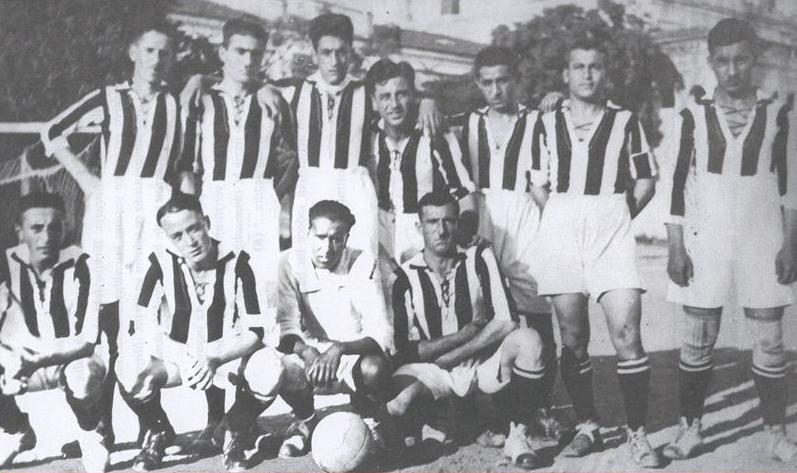
1923–24 Istanbul Football League champion squad (Note: 1923–24 Istanbul Football League champion squad (2-3-5 formation): Goalkeeper: Sadri Usuoğlu, Defenders: Tevfik Martı, Refik Osman Top, Midfielders: Bahattin, Cavit Altındal, Şahap, Forwards: Nafi, Abdi Aksoyman, Edip, Hasan, Saadet.)

Beşiktaş Jimnastik Kulübü is a multi-purpose Turkish sports club, founded in 1903, in the Beşiktaş district of Istanbul. As of 2013, the club is active in 13 different branches. The football branch of the team was formed as the club individuals gathered and begun to train together, led by Şeref Bey in 1910. Beşiktaş did not take a part of Istanbul Friday League (1904–1915) and Istanbul Sunday League (1915–1923) campaigns and started to play at competitive level of football in Istanbul League in 1923–24 season where they topped the season-end table. The club later joined Milli Küme Şampiyonası (1937–1950) and Istanbul Professional Football League (1950–1959) until the Milli Lig was formed in 1959 as the nationwide professional association football campaign.

Since 1959, Beşiktaş has competed in each and every season of the Milli Lig (1959–1962), Türkiye 1. Futbol Ligi (1962–2000) and Süper Lig (2000–present). The team has thirteen Süper Ligs, nine Turkish Cups, eight Turkish Super Cups, eight Chancellor Cups, twelve TSYD Cups, three Milli Kümes, three Turkish Federation Cups, and one Atatürk Cup as their major achievements in domestic level. In European competitions, Beşiktaş reached the quarter-finals twice, in the European Champion Clubs' Cup in 1986–87, and the UEFA Cup in 2002–03.

Below are the year-by-year final performances of Beşiktaş in domestic and international competitions.

== Seasons ==
Season	League										Domestic		Continental			Top scorer(s)	
Season	Division	Pos	Pld	W	D	L	GF	GA	GD	Pts	TC	SC	UCL	UEL	UECL (Note: Includes UEFA Cup Winners' Cup)	Player(s)	Goals
1959	Süper Lig	2nd	14	8	2	4	22	16	+6	18	–	–	–			Nazmi Bilge	16
1959–60	Süper Lig	1st	38	29	7	2	68	15	+53	65	–	–	–			Arif Özataç	16
1960–61	Süper Lig	3rd	38	22	11	5	61	26	+35	55	–	–	R1	–	–	Özacar, Birol	16
1961–62	Süper Lig	3rd	38	16	16	6	48	24	+24	48	–	–	–			Özacar, Birol	12
1962–63	Süper Lig	2nd	42	29	10	3	92	27	+65	68	QF	–	–			Şenol Birol	38
1963–64	Süper Lig	2nd	34	22	8	4	57	19	+38	52	SF	–	–			Güven Önüt	24
1964–65	Süper Lig	2nd	30	16	9	5	47	17	+30	41	R6	–	–			Rahmi Orbay	10
1965–66	Süper Lig	1st	30	20	8	2	52	16	+36	48	RU	RU	–			Ahmet Özacar	18
1966–67	Süper Lig	1st	32	16	13	3	44	15	+29	45	QF	W	R1	–	–	Joe Erwin Kuzman	9
1967–68	Süper Lig	2nd	32	15	12	5	42	24	+18	42	2R	–	R1	–	–	Sanlı Sarıalioğlu	16
1968–69	Süper Lig	3rd	30	14	10	6	30	20	+10	38	1R	–	–			Faruk Karadoğan	11
1969–70	Süper Lig	9th	30	10	10	10	26	26	0	30	1R	–	–			Nihat Yayöz	13
1970–71	Süper Lig	6th	30	10	13	7	31	20	+11	33	QF	–	–			Faruk Karadoğan, Nihat Yayöz	8
1971–72	Süper Lig	4th	30	12	10	8	28	23	+5	34	QF	–	–			Ergün Acuner	6
1972–73	Süper Lig	6th	30	9	13	8	14	18	-4	31	2R	–	–			Ergün Acuner, Sanlı Sarıalioğlu	4
1973–74	Süper Lig	2nd	30	13	14	3	34	19	+15	40	RU	W	–			Ahmet Yılmaz	9
1974–75	Süper Lig	5th	30	11	11	8	29	24	+5	33	W	RU	–	1R	–	Tezcan Ozan	19
1975–76	Süper Lig	11th	30	5	17	8	25	32	-7	27	QF	–	–	–	1R	Tezcan Ozan	11
1976–77	Süper Lig	4th	30	13	7	10	35	24	+11	33	–	RU	–			Reşit Kaynak	22
1977–78	Süper Lig	5th	30	12	8	10	33	29	+4	32	4R	–	–	–	1R	Sava Paunović	11
1978–79	Süper Lig	9th	30	10	9	11	33	32	+1	29	QF	–	–			Sava Paunović	18
1979–80	Süper Lig	11th	30	9	10	11	25	27	-2	29	R6	–	–			Necdet Ergün	9
1980–81	Süper Lig	5th	30	12	7	11	27	23	+4	31	QF	–	–			Özer Umdu	7
1981–82	Süper Lig	1st	30	14	16	2	38	17	+21	44	R6	RU	–			Bora Öztürk, Ziya Doğan	7
1982–83	Süper Lig	5th	34	16	7	11	49	30	+19	39	QF	–	1R	–	–	Necdet Ergün	18
1983–84	Süper Lig	4th	34	17	10	7	40	21	+19	44	RU	–	–			Dževad Šećerbegović, Ziya Doğan	11
1984–85	Süper Lig	2nd	34	19	12	3	49	19	+30	50	SF	–	–	–	1R	Mersad Kovačević	20
1985–86	Süper Lig	1st	36	22	12	2	65	21	+44	56	R6	W	–	1R	–	Mersad Kovačević	17
1986–87	Süper Lig	2nd	36	23	7	6	67	26	+41	53	R5	–	QF	–	–	Feyyaz Uçar	26
1987–88	Süper Lig	2nd	38	22	12	4	68	29	+39	78	QF	–	–	1R	–	Ali Gültiken	30
1988–89	Süper Lig	2nd	36	25	8	3	81	21	+60	83	W	W	–	1R	–	Feyyaz Uçar	26
1989–90	Süper Lig	1st	34	23	6	5	77	20	+57	75	W	RU	–	–	1R	Feyyaz Uçar	32
1990–91	Süper Lig	1st	30	20	9	1	63	24	+39	69	QF	RU	1R	–	–	Feyyaz Uçar	19
1991–92	Süper Lig	1st	30	23	7	0	58	20	+38	76	RU	W	1R	–	–	Feyyaz Uçar	26
1992–93	Süper Lig	2nd	30	19	9	2	68	23	+45	66	RU	RU	1R	–	–	Feyyaz Uçar	26
1993–94	Süper Lig	4th	30	16	6	8	58	30	+28	54	W	W	–	–	2R	Feyyaz Uçar	18
1994–95	Süper Lig	1st	34	24	7	3	80	26	+54	79	R6	RU	–	–	2R	Ertuğrul Sağlam	25
1995–96	Süper Lig	3rd	34	22	3	9	74	46	+28	69	QF	–	Q	–	–	Ertuğrul Sağlam	20
1996–97	Süper Lig	2nd	34	22	8	4	88	26	+62	74	QF	–	–	3R	–	Oktay Derelioğlu	30
1997–98	Süper Lig	6th	34	13	9	12	56	40	+16	48	W	W	GS	–	–	Oktay Derelioğlu	20
1998–99	Süper Lig	2nd	34	23	8	3	58	27	+31	77	RU	–	–	–	2R	Oktay Derelioğlu	18
1999–00	Süper Lig	2nd	34	23	6	5	74	27	+47	75	3R	–	Q2	–	–	Ahmet Dursun	21
2000–01	Süper Lig	4th	34	19	7	8	68	49	+19	64	RU	W	GS	–	–	Pascal Nouma	22
2001–02	Süper Lig	3rd	34	18	8	8	69	39	+30	62	RU	–		–		İlhan Mansız	24
2002–03	Süper Lig	1st	34	26	7	1	63	21	+42	85	QF	–	–	QF	–	İlhan Mansız	14
2003–04	Süper Lig	3rd	34	18	8	8	65	45	+20	62	3R	–	GS	3R	–	Ahmed Hassan	14
2004–05	Süper Lig	4th	34	20	9	5	70	39	+31	69	3R	–	–	GS	–	John Carew	14
2005–06	Süper Lig	3rd	34	15	9	10	52	39	+13	54	W	–	–	GS	–	Gökhan Güleç	11
2006–07	Süper Lig	2nd	34	18	7	9	43	32	+11	61	W	W	–	GS	–	Bobô	20
2007–08	Süper Lig	3rd	34	23	4	7	58	32	+26	73	QF	RU	GS	–	–	Bobô	16
2008–09	Süper Lig	1st	34	21	8	5	60	30	+30	71	W	–	–	1R	–	Bobô	19
2009–10	Süper Lig	4th	34	18	10	6	47	25	+22	64	GS	RU	GS	–	–	Bobô	14
2010–11	Süper Lig	5th	34	15	9	10	53	36	+17	54	W	–	–	R32	–	Bobô	16
2011–12	Süper Lig	4th	34	15	10	9	50	39	+11	55	R4	~~RU~~	–	R16	–	Hugo Almeida	14
2012–13	Süper Lig	3rd	34	16	10	8	66	35	+31	58	R5	–	DQ (Note: Finishing 2011–12 Süper Lig in the fourth-place, Beşiktaş have been disqualified by UEFA from competing in the 2012–13 UEFA Europa League, due to incompliance with UEFA Financial Fair Play Regulations.)			Filip Hološko	12
2013–14	Süper Lig	3rd	34	17	11	6	63	49	+14	62	R4	–	DQ (Note: Entered the 2013–14 UEFA Europa League under provisional measures while appealing a UEFA one-season ban. Beat Tromsø IL in the play-off 3–2 on aggregate (2–1 A; 2–0 H), but on 30 August 2013 the CAS upheld UEFA’s decision and UEFA reinstated Tromsø IL to the group stage.)			Hugo Almeida	15
2014–15	Süper Lig	3rd	34	21	6	7	59	32	+27	69	R16	–	–	R16	–	Demba Ba	27
2015–16	Süper Lig	1st	34	25	4	5	75	35	+40	79	QF	–	–	GS	–	Mario Gómez	28
2016–17	Süper Lig	1st	34	23	8	3	73	30	+43	77	R16	RU	GS	QF	–	Cenk Tosun	24
2017–18	Süper Lig	4th	34	21	8	5	69	30	+39	71	SF	RU	R16	–	–	Talisca	20
2018–19	Süper Lig	3rd	34	19	8	7	72	46	+26	65	~~B~~	–	–	GS	–	Burak Yılmaz	11
2019–20	Süper Lig	3rd	34	19	5	10	59	40	+19	62	R16	–	–	GS	–	Burak Yılmaz	14
2020–21	Süper Lig	1st	40	26	6	8	89	44	+45	84	W	–	Q2	Q3	–	Cyle Larin	23
2021–22	Süper Lig	6th	38	15	14	9	56	48	+8	59	QF	W	GS	–	–	Michy Batshuayi	14
2022–23	Süper Lig	3rd	35	23	8	4	75	33	+42	77	R6	–	–			Cenk Tosun	18
2023–24	Süper Lig	6th	38	16	8	14	52	47	+5	56	W	–	–		GS	Vincent Aboubakar	12
2024–25	Süper Lig	4th	36	17	11	8	59	36	+23	62	QF	W	–	LP	–	Ciro Immobile	19
2025–26	Süper Lig	4th	34	17	9	8	59	40	+19	60	SF	–	–	Q2	PO	Tammy Abraham	13
