= Metin-Ali-Feyyaz =

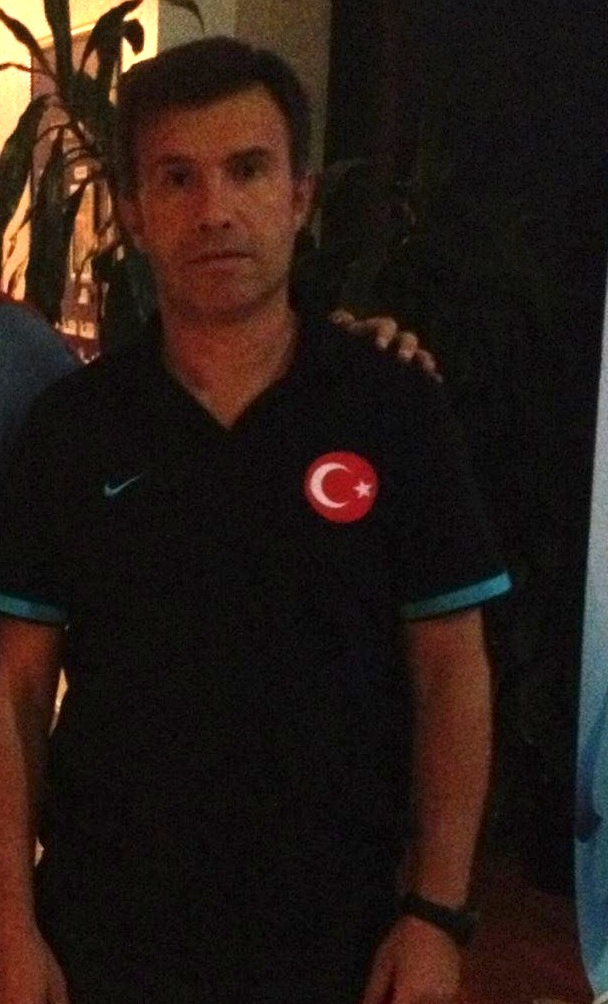
Feyyaz Uçar, 1. Lig topscorer of 1989–90 season

Metin-Ali-Feyyaz (also called Metin Ali Feyyaz, shortly MAF) is a combination of the first names of three Turkish footballers: Metin Tekin, Ali Gültiken, and Feyyaz Uçar, who served Turkish club Beşiktaş, during one of the most successful periods of the team, mostly notably under English manager Gordon Milne's spell in late 1980s and early 1990s.

== MAF years ==

91–92 season undefeated squad

The three had been recruited in relatively young ages as Tekin and Gültiken joined the squad as youth players. Tekin and Uçar were promoted to the professional team during the 1982–83 season. They were joined by Gültiken in the beginning of 1984–85 season. Tekin and Gültiken played together during the pre-season TSYD Cup for the first time. In the opening match of the season, all three footballers played for some minutes; however, they were not on the pitch at the same time. On 23 March 1984, the trio played together for the very first time after Tekin was joined by Uçar in the 67th minute and Gültiken in the 79th minute. On 5 January 1986, the three were in the starting squad for the first time. Beşiktaş managed to beat Trabzonspor with Metin Tekin's goal in that match. Later that season, the trio became permanent players in the starting eleven of the team.

The trio had achieved numerous glories, and various notable scores in domestic competitions. They contributed the only three-in-a-row title achieving term of club history in 1989–90, 1990–91 and 1991–92 seasons. Most notably, Beşiktaş became the first and to this day only undefeated champion in Turkish League history.

The three had taken a part in the squad of historical match against Adana Demirspor, ended 10–0 in favour of Beşiktaş, as the highest margin ever scored in Turkish First League history, on 15 October 1989. They scored all the goals, in which Gültiken put 4, Tekin and Uçar put 3 goals away. Started on Week 26 of 1990–91 season, the unbeaten record of the team lasted for 48 straight matches, until Week 13 of 1992–93 season.

The last competitive match where Metin, Ali, and Feyyaz played together was the league match against Zeytinburnuspor on 6 March 1994. In that match, Ali Gültiken came as a substitute in the 60th minute. The trio disbanded when Feyyaz Uçar was transferred to Fenerbahçe SK at the end of 1993–94 season.

During a post-retirement interview, Tekin expressed that he was first a Galatasaray supporter in his childhood, influenced by his father, however; he later changed his preference for Beşiktaş.

=== Statistics ===
Name	Years	1982-1983	1983-1984	1984-1985	1985-1986	1986-1987	1987-1988	1988-1989	1989-1990	1990-1991	1991-1992	1992-1993	1993-1994	1994-1995	1995-1996	1996-1997	Total
Metin Tekin	1982–1997	1	5	6	13	9	2	0	13	7	7	7	1	5	1	0	77
Ali Gültiken	1984–1995			1	1	4	30	15	17	14	5	0	0	4			91
Feyyaz Uçar	1982–1994	4	1	3	7	20	16	22	28	16	19	19	15				170
Total	1982–1997	5	6	10	21	33	48	37	58	37	31	26	16	9	1	0	338

== Honours ==
=== Club ===
- European Champion Clubs' Cup
  - Quarter Finalists: 1 (1986–87)
- Süper Lig
  - Champions: 5 (1985–86, 1989–90, 1990–91, 1991–92, 1994–95)
- Turkish Cup
  - Champions: 3 (1988–89, 1989–90, 1993–94)
- Presidential Cup
  - Champions: 4 (1985–86, 1988–89, 1991–92, 1993–94)
- Chancellor Cup
  - Champions: 2 (1987–88, 1996–97)
- TSYD Cup
  - Champions: 7 (1984, 1985, 1988, 1990, 1991, 1994, 1997)

== Second On ==
- Süper Lig
  - Second: 6 1985, 1987, 1988, 1989, 1993, 1997
- Turkish Cup
  - Second: 2 1984, 1993
- Turkish Super Cup
  - Second: 5 1982, 1990, 1991, 1993, 1995
- Chancellor Cup
  - Second: 2 1987, 1996

=== Individual ===
- Ali Gültiken
  - European Golden Shoe
    - Top Scorer - 6th Place: 1 (1987–88), 30 goals
  - Turkish League
    - Top Scorer - 2nd Place: 1 (1987–88), 30 goals
- Feyyaz Uçar
  - Turkish League
    - Top Scorer: 1 (1989–90), 28 goals

== Chants ==
The trio inspired the fans to compose various chants in MAF theme. Two of notable chats:

Turkish

Ali gol,
Metin gol,
Haydi bastır Kral Feyyaz sen de gol,
Ne Fener,
Ne Cimbom,
Bu sene de Beşiktaş'ım şampiyon.

Alternative English Translation

Ali goal,
Metin goal,
Come on Feyyaz the King, you also (score a) goal,
Neither Fener,
Nor Cimbom,
My Beşiktaş is the champion, yet again this season.

Turkish

Bir, iki, üç gol yetmez,
Dört, beş, altı olsun,
Metin, Ali, Feyyaz koysun,
Beşiktaş'ım şampiyon olsun.

Alternative English Translation

One, two, three goals is not enough,
Must be four, five, six,
Metin, Ali, Feyyaz hit
My Beşiktaş gets the championship
