= 1989–90 Galatasaray S.K. season =

Galatasaray
1989–90 season
- President: (Turkey) Ali Tanrıyar (until 17 March 1990) (Turkey) Alp Yalman
- Manager: (Germany) Sigfried Held
- Stadium: Ali Sami Yen Stadı
- 1. Lig: 4th
- Türkiye Kupası: 5th round
- UEFA Cup: 1st round
- Top goalscorer: League: Tanju Çolak (19); All: Tanju Çolak (20)
- Highest home attendance: 30,580 vs FK Crvena Zvezda (European Cup, 14 September 1989)
- Lowest home attendance: 6,483 vs Bursaspor (1. Lig, 6 May 1990)
- Average home league attendance: 18,076
Home colours	Away colours	Third colours

The 1989–90 season was Galatasaray's 86th in existence and the 32nd consecutive season in the 1. Lig. This article shows statistics of the club's players in the season, and also lists all matches that the club have played in the season.

== Squad statistics ==
No.	Pos.	Name	1. Lig		Türkiye Kupası		Uefa Cup		Total	
No.	Pos.	Name	Apps	Goals	Apps	Goals	Apps	Goals	Apps	Goals
-	GK	(Socialist Federal Republic of Yugoslavia) Zoran Simović	28	0	1	0	2	0	31	0
-	GK	(Turkey) Hayrettin Demirbaş	6	0	0	0	0	0	6	0
-	DF	(Turkey) Semih Yuvakuran	26	2	1	0	1	0	28	2
-	DF	(Turkey) Cüneyt Tanman (C)	28	3	1	0	2	0	31	3
-	DF	(Turkey) İsmail Demiriz	26	0	0	0	1	0	27	0
-	DF	(Turkey) Serhat Güller	21	0	1	0	2	0	24	0
-	DF	(Turkey) Bülent Korkmaz	19	0	0	0	2	0	21	0
-	DF	(Turkey) Yusuf Altıntaş	15	0	0	0	1	0	16	0
-	DF	(Turkey) Erhan Önal	27	1	1	0	1	0	29	1
-	MF	(Turkey) Savaş Koç	0	0	1	0	0	0	1	0
-	MF	(Turkey) Muhammet Altıntaş	29	1	1	0	1	0	31	1
-	MF	(Turkey) Tugay Kerimoğlu	24	0	1	0	2	0	27	0
-	MF	(Turkey) Savaş Demiral	22	4	0	0	0	0	22	4
-	MF	(Turkey) Metin Yıldız	0	0	0	0	1	0	1	0
-	MF	(Turkey) Ziya Yıldız	3	0	0	0	0	0	3	0
-	MF	(Socialist Federal Republic of Yugoslavia) Xhevat Prekazi	27	6	0	0	2	0	29	6
-	FW	(Turkey) İlyas Tüfekçi	6	0	0	0	2	0	8	0
-	FW	(Turkey) Bülent Alkılıç	6	0	1	0	2	0	9	0
-	FW	(Turkey) Erdal Keser	28	7	1	0	1	0	30	7
-	FW	(Turkey) Hasan Vezir	29	11	1	1	2	1	32	13
-	FW	(Turkey) Tanju Çolak	24	19	1	1	0	0	25	20
-	FW	(Turkey) Uğur Tütüneker	29	4	0	1	0	0	30	4

=== Players in / out ===
==== In ====
Pos.	Nat.	Name	Age	Moving from
FW	(Turkey)	Hasan Vezir	27	Fenerbahçe SK
FW	(Turkey)	Erdal Keser	28	Sarıyer G.K.
FW	(Turkey)	Ziya Yıldız	29	Adana Demirspor
DF	(Turkey)	Serhat Güller	21	İnegölspor

==== Out ====
Pos.	Nat.	Name	Age	Moving to
DF	(Turkey)	Arif Kocabıyık	31	Bursaspor
FW	(Socialist Federal Republic of Yugoslavia)	Mirsad Kovačevič	33	Göztepe S.K.
MF	(Turkey)	Savaş Koç (on loan)	26	MKE Ankaragücü
DF	(Turkey)	İhsan Okay	26	Gaziantepspor
FW	(Turkey)	Metin Yıldız (on loan)	29	Zeytinburnuspor
FW	(Turkey)	Ziya Yıldız (on loan)	29	MKE Ankaragücü

== 1. Lig ==
=== Standings ===
Pos	Team	Pld	W	D	L	GF	GA	GD	Pts	Qualification or relegation
2	Fenerbahçe	34	22	4	8	70	38	+32	70	Qualification to UEFA Cup first round
3	Trabzonspor	34	20	8	6	58	28	+30	68	Qualification to Cup Winners' Cup first round
4	Galatasaray	34	19	6	9	59	26	+33	63	Invitation to Balkans Cup
5	Sarıyer	34	16	11	7	52	37	+15	59	
6	Bursaspor	34	13	8	13	46	45	+1	47	

Rules for classification: 1) points; 2) goal difference; 3) number of goals scored.

=== Matches ===
3 September 1989 1	Samsunspor	1–0	Galatasaray SK	Samsun
15:00 EET	Dusko Milinkovic 24'	(Report)		Stadium: Samsun 19 Mayıs Stadı; Referee: Oğuz Sarvan

9 September 1989 2	Adana Demirspor	1–0	Galatasaray SK	Adana
17:00 EET	Çetin Kahraman 51'	(Report)		Stadium: Adana 5 Ocak Stadı; Referee: Engin Kurt

23 September 1989 3	Galatasaray SK	2–1	Karşıyaka SK	Istanbul
16:00 EET	Hasan Vezir 23', 37 p'	(Report)	Recep Umut 88'	Stadium: Ali Sami Yen Stadı; Attendance: 18,067; Referee: Coşkun Kutay

1 October 1989 4	MKE Ankaragücü	0–1	Galatasaray SK	Ankara
14:30 EET		(Report)	Hasan Vezir 82'	Stadium: Ankara 19 Mayıs Stadı; Referee: Hasan Ceylan

7 October 1989 5	Galatasaray SK	0–0	Beşiktaş JK	Istanbul
14:30 EET		(Report)		Stadium: Ali Sami Yen Stadı; Attendance: 22,890; Referee: Sadık Deda

14 October 1989 6	Adanaspor	1–0	Galatasaray SK	Adana
17:00 EET	Sead Sabotic 46'	(Report)		Stadium: Adana 5 Ocak Stadı; Referee: Erman Toroğlu

29 October 1989 7	Galatasaray SK	1–2	Altay SK	İzmir
14:30 EET	Xhevat Prekazi 68'	(Report)	Taner Gizlenci 15'; Ramazan Torunoğlu 72'	Stadium: İzmir Atatürk Stadium; Attendance: 21,742; Referee: Sadık Deda

19 November 1989 8	Gençlerbirliği SK	1–1	Galatasaray SK	Ankara
13:30 EET	Atli Edvaldsson 12'	(Report)	Cüneyt Tanman 43'	Stadium: Ankara 19 Mayıs Stadı; Referee: Kazım Ünlüsoy

25 November 1989 9	Galatasaray SK	4–0	Konyaspor	Istanbul
14:00 EET	Tanju Çolak 40 p', 68', 86'; Cüneyt Tanman 80'	(Report)		Stadium: Ali Sami Yen Stadı; Attendance: 18,416; Referee: Ahmet Çakar

3 December 1989 10	Galatasaray SK	2–2	Zeytinburnuspor	Istanbul
14:00 EET	Tanju Çolak 40'; Uğur Tütüneker 77'	(Report)	Uğur Kiremitçi 10 p' Metin Yıldız 29'	Stadium: Ali Sami Yen Stadı; Attendance: 20,818; Referee: Ergül Yücedağ

9 December 1989 11	Sakaryaspor	0–4	Galatasaray SK	Adapazarı
15:00 EET		(Report)	Erhan Önal 43'; Xhevat Prekazi 52'; Hasan Vezir 82'; Tanju Çolak 88'	Stadium: Adapazarı Atatürk Stadı; Referee: Oğuz Sarvan

16 December 1989 12	Galatasaray SK	1–0	Fenerbahçe SK	Istanbul
13:30 EET	Hasan Vezir 90'	(Report)		Stadium: Ali Sami Yen Stadı; Attendance: 19,237; Referee: İhsan Türe

24 December 1989 13	Malatyaspor	0–4	Galatasaray SK	Malatya
13:00 EET		(Report)	Hasan Vezir 26'; Cüneyt Tanman 43'; Uğur Tütüneker 63'; Savaş Demiral 86'	Stadium: Malatya İnönü Stadı; Referee: Ahmet Çakar

27 December 1989 14	Galatasaray SK	2–0	Boluspor	Istanbul
13:30 EET	Tanju Çolak 54'; Erdal Keser 74'	(Report)		Stadium: Ali Sami Yen Stadı; Attendance: 11,897; Referee: Bülent Yavuz

30 December 1989 15	Bursaspor	2–1	Galatasaray SK	Bursa
13:30 EET	Erhan Kiremitçi 56'; Andrzej Palasz 71'	(Report)	Hasan Vezir 21'	Stadium: Bursa Atatürk Stadı; Referee: Oğuz Sarvan

7 January 1990 16	Galatasaray SK	2–1	Trabzonspor	Istanbul
13:30 EET	Tanju Çolak 19'; Xhevat Prekazi 39'	(Report)	Hamdi Aslan 9'	Stadium: Ali Sami Yen Stadı; Attendance: 24,912; Referee: Ahmet Çakar

13 January 1990 17	Sarıyer G.K.	0–2	Galatasaray SK	Istanbul
13:30 EET		(Report)	Erdal Keser 53'; Hasan Vezir 61'	Stadium: Ali Sami Yen Stadı; Attendance: 5,278; Referee: Yusuf Namoğlu

4 February 1990 18	Galatasaray SK	2–1	Samsunspor	Istanbul
14:00 EET	Tanju Çolak 18', 43 p'	(Report)	Kasım Çıkla 34'	Stadium: Ali Sami Yen Stadı; Attendance: 24,042; Referee: Engin Kurt

11 February 1990 19	Galatasaray SK	3–0	Adana Demirspor	Istanbul
14:00 EET	Muhammet Altıntaş 10'; Semih Yuvakuran 59'; Tanju Çolak 87'	(Report)		Stadium: Ali Sami Yen Stadı; Attendance: 16,783; Referee: Serdar Çakmak

18 February 1990 20	Karşıyaka SK	1–2	Galatasaray SK	İzmir
14:00 EET	Ali Yüksel Can 84'	(Report)	Tanju Çolak 44 p' Erdal Keser 69'	Stadium: İzmir Atatürk Stadium; Attendance: 29,312; Referee: Sadık Deda

21 February 1990 21	Galatasaray SK	2–0	MKE Ankaragücü	Istanbul
14:00 EET	Uğur Tütüneker 33', 57'	(Report)		Stadium: Ali Sami Yen Stadı; Attendance: 15,412; Referee: Oğuz Sarvan

25 February 1990 22	Beşiktaş JK	1–0	Galatasaray SK	Istanbul
14:00 EET	Ali Gültiken 53'	(Report)		Stadium: İnönü Stadı; Attendance: 36,500; Referee: Yusuf Namoğlu

4 March 1990 23	Galatasaray SK	5–0	Adanaspor	Istanbul
14:30 EET	Tanju Çolak 3', 59', 72', 83', 88'	(Report)		Stadium: Ali Sami Yen Stadı; Attendance: 10,448; Referee: Kazım Ünlüsoy

11 March 1990 24	Altay SK	0–2	Galatasaray SK	İzmir
14:00 EET		(Report)	Xhevat Prekazi 14'; Tanju Çolak 79'	Stadium: İzmir Atatürk Stadium; Attendance: 30,905; Referee: Ünal Ünal

18 March 1990 25	Galatasaray SK	1–1	Gençlerbirliği SK	Istanbul
14:30 EET	Erdal Keser 81'	(Report)	Avni Okumuş 86'	Stadium: Ali Sami Yen Stadı; Attendance: 21,832; Referee: Hasan Ceylan

25 March 1990 26	Konyaspor	0–1	Galatasaray SK	Konya
15:00 EET		(Report)	Hasan Vezir 13'	Stadium: Konya Atatürk Stadı; Referee: Serdar Çakman

1 April 1990 27	Zeytinburnuspor	0–2	Galatasaray SK	Istanbul
15:30 EET		(Report)	Erdal Keser 35', 87'	Stadium: Ali Sami Yen Stadı; Attendance: 26,193; Referee: Yahya Diker

8 April 1990 28	Galatasaray SK	5–1	Sakaryaspor	Istanbul
15:30 EET	Hasan Vezir 50', 68'; Semih Yuvakuran 54'; Erdal Keser 65'; Xhevat Prekazi 82'	(Report)	İlker Yağcıoğlu 89'	Stadium: Ali Sami Yen Stadı; Attendance: 22,019; Referee: Zihni Aksoy

15 April 1990 29	Fenerbahçe SK	5–1	Galatasaray SK	Istanbul
15:30 EET	Şenol Çorlu 11 p' Aykut Kocaman 26'; Hakan Tecimer 38'; Şenol Ulusavaş 87'; Oğuz Çetin 88'	(Report)	Nezihi Tosuncuk 26 og'	Stadium: Fenerbahçe Stadı; Attendance: 28,433; Referee: Özcan Oal

22 April 1990 30	Galatasaray SK	0–0	Malatyaspor	Istanbul
15:00 EET		(Report)		Stadium: Ali Sami Yen Stadı; Attendance: 14,216; Referee: Engin Kurt

29 April 1990 31	Boluspor	1–0	Galatasaray SK	Bolu
15:30 EET	Cengiz İğneci 88'	(Report)		Stadium: Bolu Atatürk Stadı; Referee: Erman Toroğlu

6 May 1990 32	Galatasaray SK	5–1	Bursaspor	Istanbul
15:30 EET	Savaş Demiral 8', 61', 82'; Tanju Çolak 25 p' Xhevat Prekazi 32'	(Report)	Erhan Kiremitçi 39'	Stadium: Ali Sami Yen Stadı; Attendance: 6,483; Referee: Engin Kurt

12 May 1990 33	Trabzonspor	1–0	Galatasaray SK	Trabzon
15:30 EET	Hamdi Aslan 39'	(Report)		Stadium: Hüseyin Avni Aker Stadı; Referee: Ünal Ünal

20 May 1990 34	Galatasaray SK	1–1	Sarıyer G.K.	Istanbul
15:30 EET	Tanju Çolak 44'	(Report)	Wallace da Silva 58'	Stadium: Ali Sami Yen Stadı; Referee: Engin Yücedağ

== Türkiye Kupası ==
Kick-off listed in local time (EET)

=== 5th round ===
8 February 1990 1	Sarıyer G.K.	3–2	Galatasaray SK	Istanbul
13:00 EET	Mustafa Yücedağ 8p', 50'; Sercan Görgülü 119'	(Report)	Tanju Çolak 36'; Hasan Vezir 42'	Stadium: Ali Sami Yen Stadı; Attendance: 13,572; Referee: Özcan Oal

== UEFA Cup ==
=== 1st round ===
14 September 1989 1	Galatasaray SK	1–1	FK Crvena Zvezda	Istanbul
15:00 TRT	Hasan Vezir 35'	(Report)	Mitar Mrkela 11'	Stadium: Ali Sami Yen Stadı; Attendance: 30,580; Referee: (Belgium) Alphonse Constantin

27 September 1989 2	FK Crvena Zvezda	2–0	Galatasaray SK	Belgrade
17:30 CET	Vladan Lukić 3'; Darko Pančev 66'	(Report)		Stadium: Stadion Crvena Zvezda; Attendance: 46,866; Referee: (Spain) Joaqim Ramos Marcos

== Başbakanlık Kupası ==
Kick-off listed in local time (EET)

20 August 1989 1	Galatasaray SK	2–3	Fenerbahçe SK	Ankara
20:00 EET	Bülent Alkılıç 13'; İlyas Tüfekçi 22'	(Report)	Şenol Çorlu 27', 88'; Aykut Kocaman 92'	Stadium: 19 Mayıs Stadı; Attendance: 14,449; Referee: Hasan Ceylan

23 May 1990 1	Galatasaray SK	1–0	Trabzonspor	Ankara
17:00 EET	Tanju Çolak 71'	(Report)		Stadium: 19 Mayıs Stadı; Referee: Kazım Ünlüsoy

== Friendly Matches ==
Kick-off listed in local time (EET)

=== TSYD Kupası ===
16 August 1989 1	Galatasaray SK	1–0	Fenerbahçe SK	Istanbul
17:00 EET	Erdal Keser 78'	(Report)		Stadium: Ali Sami Yen Stadı; Attendance: 32,071; Referee: Ergül Yücedağ

23 August 1989 2	Beşiktaş JK	3–1	Galatasaray SK	Istanbul
17:00 EET	Mehmet Özdilek 45'; Ali Gültiken 55'; Halim Okta 63'	(Report)	Serhat Güller 66'	Stadium: İnönü Stadı; Attendance: 23,774; Referee: Yusuf Namoğlu

== Attendance ==
Competition	Av. Att.	Total Att.
1. Lig	18,076	289,214
UEFA Cup	30,580	30,580
Total	18,811	319,794
