= Beşiktaş J.K. 10–0 Adana Demirspor =

Beşiktaş v Adana Demirspor
- Event: 1989–90 1.Lig
Beşiktaş	Adana Demirspor
10	0
- Date: 15 October 1989
- Venue: Ali Sami Yen Stadium, Istanbul
- Referee: Engin Kurt
- Attendance: 15,227

10–0 is the final score of the Süper Lig game played between Beşiktaş J.K. and Adana Demirspor at 1989–90 season, on 15 October 1989. The score sets the current Biggest win record in history of Süper Lig.

== Match ==
Beşiktaş started 1989–90 season with 2 losses and 1 draw at first 5 games, before playing against Adana Demirspor. Game took place on 15 October 1989, Sunday at Ali Sami Yen Stadium.

Beşiktaş started the game without any foreign players. Ali Gültiken opened score with a header in 2nd minute. Feyyaz Uçar scored second goal at 12th minute. First half ended 4–0, following 2 goals scored by Metin Tekin respectively in 24th and 43rd minutes. Goals were scored Gültiken (4), Uçar (3) and Tekin (3).

Beşiktaş generated TL207.74m of revenue in consequence of 15,227 of attendance. The score led Beşiktaş supporters to compose particular chant, dedicated to this game.

=== Details ===
15 October 1989
14:30 EEST

Beşiktaş	10–0	Adana Demirspor
Gültiken 2', 55', 60', 84'; Uçar 11', 65', 86'; Tekin 25', 44', 77'	Report

Ali Sami Yen, Istanbul
Attendance: 15,227
Referee: Engin Kurt

Beşiktaş	Adana Demirspor

GK	1	(Turkey) Engin İpekoğlu	(substituted off) 62'
RB	2	(Turkey) Recep Çetin
CB	4	(Turkey) Gökhan Keskin
CB	5	(Turkey) Ulvi Güveneroğlu
LB	3	(Turkey) Kadir Akbulut
CM	8	(Turkey) Rıza Çalımbay
CM	6	(Turkey) Şenol Fidan
CM	9	(Turkey) Zeki Önatlı
RW	11	(Turkey) Metin Tekin
CF	7	(Turkey) Feyyaz Uçar
LW	10	(Turkey) Ali Gültiken
Substitutes:
GK	12	(Turkey) Metin Akçevre	(substituted in) 62'
DF		(Turkey) İsmail Taviş
MF		(Turkey) Halim Okta
MF		(Turkey) Turan Uzun
MF		(England) Alan Walsh
Manager:
(England) Gordon Milne

GK	(Turkey) Fatih Yılmaz	(substituted off) 46'
DF	(Turkey) Cengizhan Köksal
DF	(Turkey) Murat Sönmez	(yellow card) 66'
DF	(Turkey) Muammer Birdal
DF	(Turkey) Erol Demirhan
DF	(Turkey) Mehmet Demirtaş
MF	(Turkey) Sedat Varak	(substituted off) 46'
MF	(Turkey) İbrahim Uzunca
FW	(Turkey) Ümit Özkalp
FW	(Turkey) İsmail Akbaşlı
FW	(Turkey) İbrahim Çolak
Substitutes:
GK	(Turkey) Haluk Uğurludoğan	(substituted in) 46'
DF	(Turkey) Mustafa Ulucan
	(Turkey) Ergün Aytekin
FW	(Turkey) Cihan Metin
FW	(Turkey) Çetin Kahraman	(substituted in) 46'
Manager:
(Turkey) Ali Hoşfikirer

Match officials

- Assistant referees:
  - Atilla Olgun
  - Yolcu Yılmaz

Match rules

- 90 minutes
