= Mehmet Özdilek =

Turkish footballer and manager

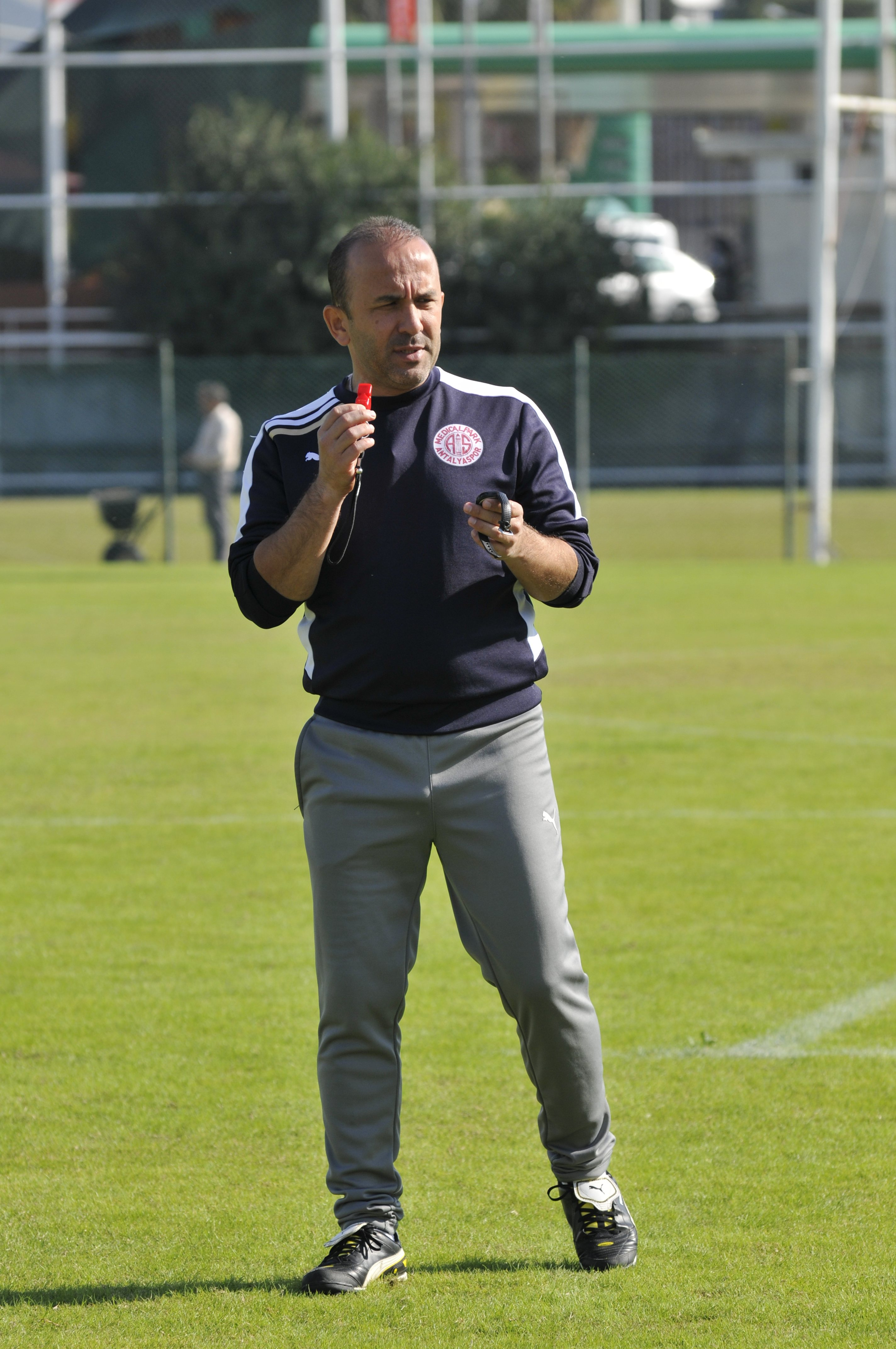

Personal information
- Full name: Mehmet Özdilek
- Date of birth: 1 April 1966 (age 60)
- Place of birth: Ladik, Samsun Province, Turkey
- Height: 1.67 m (5 ft 6 in)
- Position: Attacking midfielder

Youth career
- 1981–1984: Samsun Ladikspor

Senior career*
Years	Team	Apps	(Gls)
1984–1988	Kahramanmaraşspor	107	(63)
1988–2001	Beşiktaş	386	(130)
Total		493	(193)

International career
1990–1997	Turkey	31	(0)

Managerial career
- 2004: Malatyaspor
- 2005: Sarıyer (youth)
- 2005: Turkey (assistant)
- 2007–2008: Yakacık Futbol Okulu (coach)
- 2008–2013: Antalyaspor
- 2013–2014: Gençlerbirliği
- 2014: Çaykur Rizespor
- 2015: Kayseri Erciyesspor
- 2015: Gençlerbirliği
- 2017: Turkey (assistant)
- 2017–2018: Konyaspor
- 2019: BB Erzurumspor
- 2019–2020: Denizlispor
- 2020: BB Erzurumspor
- * Club domestic league appearances and goals

"Şifo" Mehmet Özdilek (born 1 April 1966, in Samsun) is a Turkish football manager and former player. He is nicknamed "Şifo" after Belgian star Enzo Scifo with whom he shared a similar playing style.

Having spent most of his professional career with Beşiktaş, he is regarded as one of the idols of the İstanbul side. Özdilek is one of the most prolific scorers of Turkish football despite playing mainly in midfield. During his Beşiktaş days he has managed to score 130 goals which was a record for most goals scored by a midfield player in Turkish top-flight.

For 13 years, Beşiktaş has worn his form. In 1991, he won the Footballer of the Year award in Turkey. He took part in the squad which was the "Undefeated Champion" in 1992. With 130 goals It is the domestic midfielder who scored the most points of the Süper Lig in all time. He also scored 100 goals and entered the 100s club. He was captain of Beşiktaş for 4 years. On behalf of Mehmet Özdilek, who won the appreciation of everyone who is impartial with the personality of the example, the Special Jubilee Match was organized by Besiktas with AC Milan on 4 August 2001. Beşiktaş's Milan defeat at the BJK İnönü Stadium led to one of the most spectacular jubilees of the Turkish football history. The match donated all of its income to the Education Volunteers Foundation of Turkey (TEGV) itself. He never saw any red cards in official matches in his career.

== Club career ==
=== Early years ===
Born in Samsun, Özdilek started to play at the amateur level with his hometown outfit Samsun Ladikspor. While he was only 16, he was scouted and picked up by Kahramanmaraşspor, a team which has freshly promoted to the second-tier of Turkish football. Özdilek managed to make an immediate impact on his new team and became a regular of the starting line-up while Kahramanmaraşspor's record in the league improved every season. In the 1986–87 campaign, Özdilek had an outstanding season and became the topscorer of the Turkish 1. League with 29 goals while his team narrowly missed promotion. The following season proved to be an even more successful one for Kahramanmaraşspor. With Özdilek's contribution the team finished at the top of the league and promoted to the first-tier of Turkish football for the first time in their short history. His consistently high performance did not go unnoticed and at the end of the 1987–88 season he was transferred to Beşiktaş, the team which he spent the remainder of his career with.

=== Beşiktaş ===
In Özdilek's first year Beşiktaş have won the Turkish Cup and came second in the league. The following years proved to be even more successful for the team. Under Gordon Milne's helm, Beşiktaş's young outfit started to dominate Turkish football in a way which was unprecedented before. In the 1988–89 season Beşiktaş claimed the double, winning both the league and the Turkish Cup and broke the record for the highest scoring game of Turkish football history, beating Adana Demirspor 10–0. Özdilek contributed to this glorius season by scoring a goal in the Cup final against Trabzonspor. In the following year, Beşiktaş became the league champion again without breaking much sweat. The team has lost only one game throughout the campaign but the team managed to improve even more on the next season. In the 1991–92 football season, Beşiktaş became the only undefeated champion of the Turkish top-flight while Özdilek netted 12 goals. This record-breaking string of results came to an end only in the following season when Beşiktaş was finally beaten by Galatasaray after 48 weeks. 1992–93 season ended bitterly for Beşiktaş when the team did not just lost the Turkish Cup to Galatasaray in the Cup final, but also lost the championship to after 3 years to the same team on goal difference while Özdilek scored 13 goals in the campaign.

1993–94 season was not a successful one. For the first time in 8 years, Beşiktaş finished the league outside of the top two while Özdilek had a quiet year comparing to his high standards and netted 8 goals. The sole consolation of the year was another Turkish Cup added to the club's trophy cabinet. Next year saw the arrival of Christoph Daum replacing Milne, revitalising the team and winning the league again. This was Özdilek's 4. league title with Beşiktaş and he contributed to campaign with 8 goals. In the 1995–96 season Özdilek was in top form again, netting 11 goals while Beşiktaş finished the league at the third place. Mehmet continued to score heavily on the next season and scored 11 goals in the league while Beşiktaş improved comparing to the last season and finishing the league at the second place after Galatasaray. The following season proved to be one of the least successful campaigns of Beşiktaş. The team finished the league at the sixth place. Along with the Turkish Cup title, Özdilek's spectacular performance was a source of consolation. Mehmet scored 16 times in the league, becoming third most-scoring among all the players and the most-scoring midfield player. He also scored in the Cup final against Galatasaray. This was Özdilek's fourth Cup title with Beşiktaş.

Beşiktaş lost against Valerenga and was eliminated from the Cup Winners' Cup. Then a middle-aged man was shouting behind the crowd behind the wire looms: "Captaaaiiinnn!". The black and white captain, Özdilek, did not remain indifferent to the man's call, facing the other side of the wire. "When the first half is over I told my son to go to bed because he would go to school tomorrow. What am I going to say to this kid when he wakes up in the morning? How will I say that Beşiktaş is being handed down for God's sake?" Özdilek apologized.

In 1998–99 season Beşiktaş once again came very close to a double and prevented by Galatasaray. The Black Eagles lost the league with just one point difference. Özdilek scored heavily in this season, too, and netted 13 goals. In the next year, the scenario remained the same. Galatasaray won the league with four-point ahead of Beşiktaş while Mehmet scored 11 goals in the contest. Following season proved to be the last one for Özdilek and he retired from football after playing 14 years for Beşiktaş. He wore the black and white colours for the last time on the pitch in a testimonial honouring his services for his club against the Italian giants, AC Milan. Gathered money was donated to a charity which grants free education to the children in need.

With 130 goals under his belt, Mehmet is still, the second most-scoring player of Beşiktaş's history after Feyyaz Uçar.

== International career ==
During his playing career, he made 31 appearances for the Turkey national football team from 1990 to 1997. He played at UEFA Euro 1992 qualifying, 1994 FIFA World Cup qualification and 1998 FIFA World Cup qualification stages.

== Style of play ==
Özdilek was a skillful two-footed player. Although he was short, he was able to score multiple headers throughout his career (recorded as 32 headed goals). He was described as a player with flexible ankles, allowing him to have great control over the ball. As well, he was described as being able to dictate matches from his attacking midfield role. He attracted attention with his sportsmanship on the field, his approach to fans with love and humility, and his respect for his opponents.

== Coaching career ==
Mehmet Ozdilek resigned as coach of the Turkey national football team. He then worked in many Turkish clubs.

== Career statistics ==
=== Club ===
Appearances and goals by club, season and competition
Club	Season	League			Turkish Cup		Super Cup		Continental		Other (Note: Includes Chancellor Cup, TSYD Cup, Fleet Cup)		Total	
Club	Season	Division	Apps	Goals	Apps	Goals	Apps	Goals	Apps	Goals	Apps	Goals	Apps	Goals
Kahramanmaraşspor	1984–85	2.Lig	22	2	4	0	—		—		—		26	2
Kahramanmaraşspor	1985–86	2.Lig	29	6	0	0	—		—		—		29	6
Kahramanmaraşspor	1986–87	2.Lig	24	29	0	0	—		—		—		24	29
Kahramanmaraşspor	1987–88	2.Lig	32	26	0	0	—		—		—		32	26
Kahramanmaraşspor	Total		107	63	4	0	—		—		—		111	63
Beşiktaş	1988–89	1.Lig	34	8	10	1	1	0	2	0	2	0	49	9
Beşiktaş	1989–90	1.Lig	30	3	4	4	1	0	2	0	2	1	39	8
Beşiktaş	1990–91	1.Lig	27	10	2	1	1	0	2	0	2	2	34	13
Beşiktaş	1991–92	1.Lig	30	12	2	1	1	1	2	1	2	1	37	16
Beşiktaş	1992–93	1.Lig	28	14	6	1	1	0	2	0	1	0	38	15
Beşiktaş	1993–94	1.Lig	25	9	4	0	1	0	4	1	1	0	35	10
Beşiktaş	1994–95	1.Lig	31	8	1	0	1	0	3	1	1	0	37	9
Beşiktaş	1995–96	1.Lig	33	11	3	0	0	0	2	1	4	0	42	12
Beşiktaş	1996–97	1.Lig	31	11	5	1	0	0	8	0	3	2	47	14
Beşiktaş	1997–98	1.Lig	29	15	5	2	1	0	7	2	0	0	42	19
Beşiktaş	1998–99	1.Lig	27	13	6	0	0	0	4	1	2	0	39	14
Beşiktaş	1999–2000	1.Lig	33	11	1	0	0	0	2	0	0	0	36	11
Beşiktaş	2000–01	1.Lig	28	5	2	1	0	0	8	0	0	0	38	6
Beşiktaş	Total		386	130	51	12	8	1	48	7	20	6	513	156
Career total			493	193	55	12	8	1	48	7	20	6	624	219

=== International ===
Turkey national team
Year	Apps	Goals
1990	4	0
1991	6	0
1992	8	0
1993	5	0
1994	1	0
1995	2	0
1996	1	0
1997	4	0
Total	31	0

=== Managerial ===
Last updated 4 June 2013

Team	Nat	From	To	Record				
Team	Nat	From	To	G	W	D	L	Win %
Malatyaspor	(Turkey)	2004	2004	18	4	6	8	22.22
Antalyaspor	(Turkey)	2008	2013	201	77	48	76	38.31
Gençlerbirliği	(Turkey)	2013	2014	28	13	5	10	46.43
Çaykur Rizespor	(Turkey)	2014	2015	23	6	4	13	26.09
Gençlerbirliği	(Turkey)	2015		5	1	1	3	20.00
Total				219	81	54	84	36.99

== Honours ==
=== Club ===
Kahramanmaraşspor

- Turkish 1. League: 1988

==== Beşiktaş ====
Winner: (19 Cups)

- Süper Lig: 1990, 1991, 1992, 1995
- Turkish Cup: 1989, 1990, 1994, 1998
- Turkish Super Cup: 1989, 1992, 1994, 1998
- Chancellor Cup: 1997
- Atatürk Cup: 2000
- TSYD Cup: 1988, 1989, 1990, 1993, 1996

Runner-up: (12 Cups)

- Süper Lig: 1989, 1993, 1997, 1999, 2000
- Turkish Cup: 1993, 1999
- Turkish Super Cup: 1990, 1991, 1993, 1995
- Chancellor Cup: 1996

=== Individual ===
- Turkish 1. League Topscorer: 1986/87, 1987–88
- Turkish Player of the Year: 1991
- 100's club member: 130 goals in 386 matches
- Turkish Cup Topscorer 1990: 4 goals
- Beşiktaş is the 2nd footballer who wears the most in European Cups: 48 matches
- Beşiktaş formally scored the most goals in all times in Süper Lig local midfielder: 130 goals
- He is the domestic midfielder who scored the most points in all time in the Super League: 130 goals
- 513 appearances with Beşiktaş has been the second footballer since Rıza Çalımbay in the official matches since 1959.
- Beşiktaş Süper Lig 3 football players who played most matches: 386 matches
- Beşiktaş has scored the most goals in official matches since the founding of the 4th footballer: 156 goals
- After Beşiktaş's Feyyaz Uçar, he scored most goals in the Süper Lig, 2nd footballer: 130 goals
- Beşiktaş J.K. Squads of Century (Bronze Team)
