= Rıza Çalımbay =

Turkish footballer and manager (born 1963)

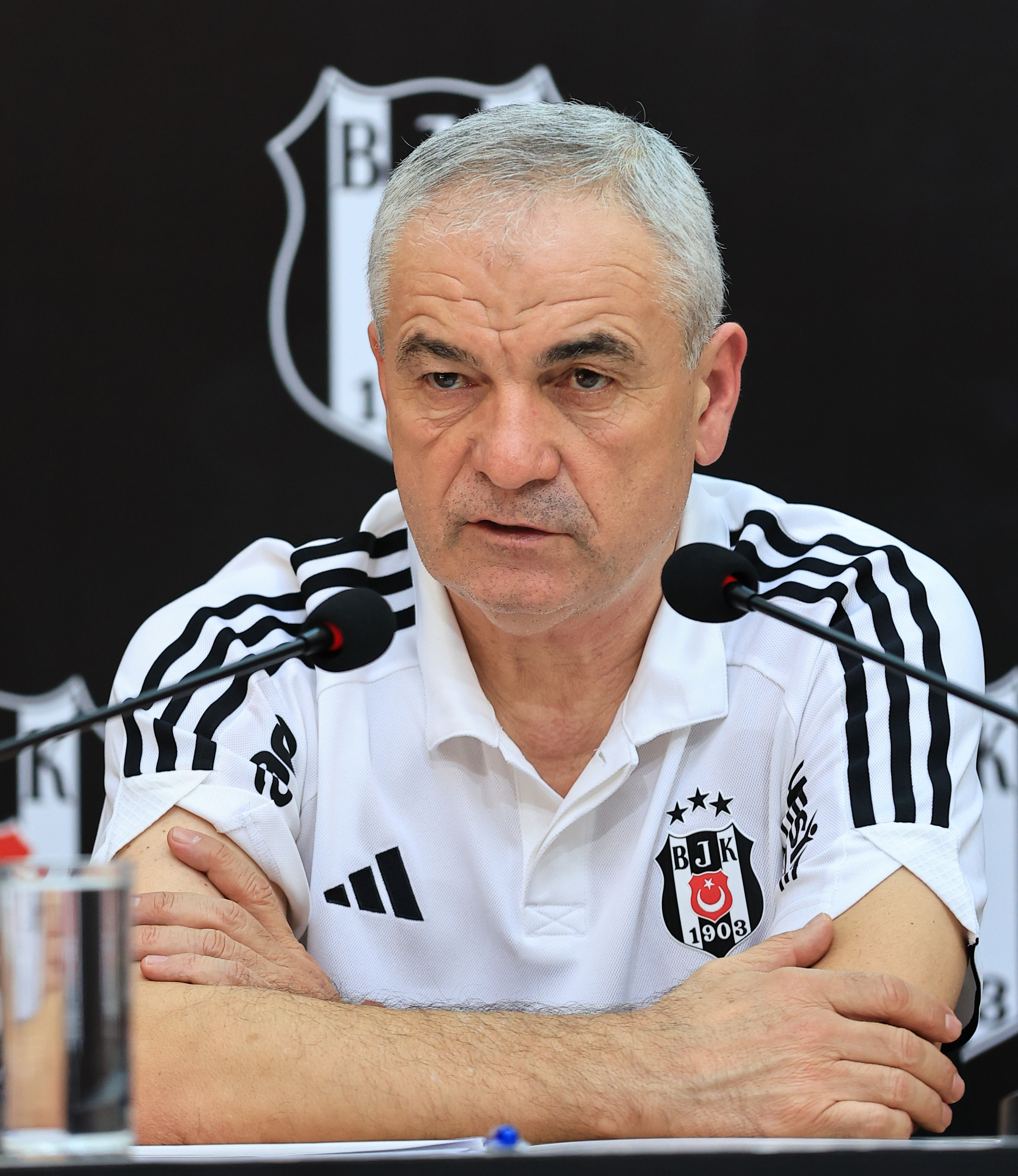
- Çalımbay with Beşiktaş in 2023

Personal information
- Full name: Rıza Çalımbay
- Date of birth: 2 February 1963 (age 63)
- Place of birth: Sivas, Turkey
- Height: 1.72 m (5 ft 7 1/2 in)
- Position: Winger

Senior career*
Years	Team	Apps	(Gls)
1980–1996	Beşiktaş	494	(43)

International career
1980–1981	Turkey U18	6	(0)
1981–1984	Turkey U21	8	(0)
1981–1992	Turkey	37	(1)

Managerial career
- 2001: Göztepe
- 2002–2003: Denizlispor
- 2003–2004: Ankaragücü
- 2004–2005: Çaykur Rizespor
- 2005: Beşiktaş
- 2005–2006: Ankaraspor
- 2007: Çaykur Rizespor
- 2008–2010: Eskişehirspor
- 2010–2013: Sivasspor
- 2013–2014: Çaykur Rizespor
- 2014–2015: Mersin İdmanyurdu
- 2015–2016: Kasımpaşa
- 2016–2017: Antalyaspor
- 2017–2018: Trabzonspor
- 2018: Konyaspor
- 2019–2023: Sivasspor
- 2023: Beşiktaş
- 2024: Hatayspor
- 2025: Sivasspor
- * Club domestic league appearances and goals

Rıza Çalımbay (born 2 February 1963) is a Turkish UEFA Pro Licensed football manager and former player.

Under his leadership, Sivasspor won the 2021–22 Turkish Cup, the first major trophy in the club's history. He has also coached other Turkish clubs including Beşiktaş, Konyaspor, Trabzonspor, and Antalyaspor. He holds the record for the highest number of matches played by any manager in the Süper Lig, with a total of 622 games as a coach.

Çalımbay was nicknamed 'Atom Ant' (Turkish: Atom Karınca) due to his determination and hard work both as a player and coach.

== Playing career ==
Rıza Çalımbay began his football career in the academy of Beşiktaş, one of the biggest clubs in Turkey. He was promoted to the A team squad in the 1980–81 season, where he played as a midfielder on the right side. However, he also proved to be a versatile player who could play in other positions such as central midfield and right-back. In his 16 seasons with Beşiktaş A Team, he played 494 league matches and scored a total of 41 goals. He received the title of the Beşiktaş player with the most appearances in the history of the 1st League. Throughout his football career, he only played for Beşiktaş and served as captain for many years.

During his time at Beşiktaş, Çalımbay won 6 leagues, 3 Turkish Cups, 4 Presidential Cups, 1 Prime Minister's Cup, and 6 Turkish Sports Writers' Association Cups. After 16 seasons, he retired from active football in July 1996 with a jubilee farewell match.

== International career ==
Rıza Çalımbay played for the national team 37 times and also played for the Under-21 (Ümit) team 8 times and the Youth (Genç) team 52 times. His sole senior international goal came on 13 November 1991, when he converted a penalty in a match against Ireland, which was lost 3–1.

Additionally, in 1991 he was selected to play for a World Team. The UNICEF charity match against the German national team was played in Munich to raise funds for children around the world.

== Managerial career ==
=== Early career ===
After retiring from football, Rıza Çalımbay pursued a career in coaching and completed manager courses in England. He then served as an assistant manager for Christoph Daum at Beşiktaş in 2001 but resigned shortly after to take over as the manager of Göztepe, Denizlispor, and Çaykur Rizespor.

At Denizlispor, he led the team to the latter stages of the 2002–03 UEFA Cup season, where they eliminated teams such as Sparta Prague and Olympique Lyonnais. However, their UEFA Cup dreams were crushed by the Porto side of José Mourinho in an 8–3 aggregate loss. In the 2004–05 season, Çalımbay returned to Beşiktaş as manager after Vicente Del Bosque was sacked. Despite a rough start to the season with bad results and a demotivated squad, Çalımbay helped turn the team's fortunes around. He reverted to the team's traditional 3–5–2 formation and implemented a playing style that brought results such as a 4–3 win over rivals Fenerbahçe at the Şükrü Saracoğlu Stadium.

However, the following season was not as successful, and Çalımbay resigned after a 0–0 draw against Kayserispor in the 9th week of the season. He then coached Ankaraspor for a brief period before returning to Çaykur Rizespor for a 1.5 year contract. Despite options to coach abroad in Iran and Germany, Çalımbay chose to continue his tenure with Çaykur Rizespor. He later coached Eskişehirspor, Sivasspor, Mersin İdmanyurdu, and Kasımpaşa.

On 10 October 2016, Çalımbay signed a two-year contract with Antalyaspor, but they parted ways on 19 September 2017. He then became the manager of Trabzonspor in the ninth week of the 2017–18 Super League season and led the team throughout the season. Under his leadership, the team played 26 league and 5 cup matches, finishing in 5th place with 13 wins, 7 draws, and 6 losses in the league. However, they were eliminated by Konyaspor in the last 16 round of the Turkish Cup. After his contract expired at the end of the season, he left the job.

=== Sivasspor ===
On 10 June 2019 Çalımbay began his second stint as Sivasspor manager. Upon his arrival, Çalımbay implemented a new tactical style that emphasized defensive organization and quick, incisive attacking play. Çalımbay's philosophy brought a new level of energy and optimism to the club. Under Çalımbay's leadership, Sivasspor experienced a resurgence of form, and the team made significant strides towards becoming a major force in Turkish football. The 2021–22 season proved to be a historic one for the club, as they won the Turkish Cup for the first time in their history.

In the 20 March 2023 match between Sivasspor and Ankaragücü, Çalımbay made history by becoming the coach with the most matches played in the history of the Süper Lig. Çalımbay played his 622nd game in the Süper Lig during the Ankaragücü struggle, breaking the previous record held by Samet Aybaba, who had overseen 621 matches.

== Career statistics ==
=== Player ===
As of 7 May 2017

==== Club ====
Club	Season	1.Lig		Cup (Note: Includes Turkish Cup, Atatürk Cup, Chancellor Cup, Turkish Super Cup and TSYD Cup)		Europe (Note: Includes European Cup, UEFA Cup, UEFA Cup Winners' Cup)		Total	
Club	Season	Apps	Goals	Apps	Goals	Apps	Goals	Apps	Goals
Beşiktaş	1980–81	13	0	4	0	–		17	0
Beşiktaş	1981–82	32	1	8	0	–		40	1
Beşiktaş	1982–83	34	1	10	0	2	0	46	2
Beşiktaş	1983–84	31	0	13	0	–		44	0
Beşiktaş	1984–85	32	2	11	1	1	0	44	3
Beşiktaş	1985–86	36	9	10	1	–		46	10
Beşiktaş	1986–87	36	10	5	3	4	1	45	14
Beşiktaş	1987–88	36	6	7	0	2	0	45	6
Beşiktaş	1988–89	33	3	12	1	2	0	47	4
Beşiktaş	1989–90	34	3	5	1	2	0	42	4
Beşiktaş	1990–91	30	5	5	0	2	0	37	5
Beşiktaş	1991–92	30	1	6	0	2	0	38	1
Beşiktaş	1992–93	29	0	9	2	2	0	40	2
Beşiktaş	1993–94	29	1	9	0	4	0	42	1
Beşiktaş	1994–95	32	1	4	0	4	0	40	1
Beşiktaş	1995–96	27	0	4	0	2	0	33	0
Career total		494	43	122	9	29	4	645	53

==== International ====
Turkey
Year	Apps	Goals
1981	1	0
1982	3	0
1983	3	0
1984	1	0
1985	1	0
1987	5	0
1989	2	0
1990	5	0
1991	10	1
1992	7	0
Total	38	1

#	Date	Venue	Opponent	Goals	Result	Competition
1	13 November 1991	BJK İnönü Stadium,	Republic of Ireland	1–1	1–3	UEFA Euro 1992 qualifying

=== Manager ===
As of 23 December 2024

Team	Nat	From	To	Record				
Team	Nat	From	To	G	W	D	L	Win %
Göztepe	(Turkey)	15 June 2001	19 December 2001	19	7	6	6	36.84
Denizlispor	(Turkey)	3 January 2002	28 April 2003	58	21	16	21	36.21
Ankaragücü	(Turkey)	17 November 2003	31 May 2004	24	10	4	10	41.67
Rizespor	(Turkey)	3 August 2004	28 January 2005	19	9	5	5	47.37
Beşiktaş	(Turkey)	28 January 2005	17 October 2005	30	18	7	5	60.00
Ankaraspor	(Turkey)	10 November 2005	23 January 2006	6	1	2	3	16.67
Rizespor	(Turkey)	26 December 2006	19 June 2007	18	6	4	8	33.33
Eskişehirspor	(Turkey)	4 July 2008	27 September 2010	84	29	23	32	34.52
Sivasspor	(Turkey)	25 October 2010	31 May 2013	115	43	30	42	37.39
Rizespor	(Turkey)	31 May 2013	9 February 2014	22	5	7	10	22.73
Mersin İdman Yurdu	(Turkey)	3 June 2014	31 May 2015	45	18	10	17	40.00
Kasımpaşa	(Turkey)	7 July 2015	16 September 2016	39	15	10	14	38.46
Antalyaspor	(Turkey)	10 October 2016	18 September 2017	34	17	8	9	50.00
Trabzonspor	(Turkey)	18 October 2017	19 May 2018	31	16	8	7	51.61
Konyaspor	(Turkey)	2 August 2018	13 October 2018	14	5	5	4	35.71
Sivasspor	(Turkey)	6 June 2019	26 June 2023	191	79	52	60	41.36
Beşiktaş	(Turkey)	10 November 2023	21 December 2023	7	3	1	3	42.86
Hatayspor	(Turkey)	8 September 2024	Present	14	2	5	7	14.29
Total				753	304	203	246	40.37

== Honours ==
=== Player ===
Beşiktaş

- 1.Lig: 1981–82, 1985–86, 1989–90, 1990–91, 1991–92, 1994–95
- Turkish Cup: 1988–89, 1989–90, 1993–94
- Turkish Super Cup: 1986, 1989, 1992, 1994
- Chancellor Cup: 1988
- TSYD Cup: 1983, 1984, 1988, 1989, 1990, 1993, 1996

Individual

- Beşiktaş Team of the Century

Records

- Beşiktaş All-Time Appearance Maker: 645 games
- Beşiktaş All-Time Appearance Maker in Süper Lig: 494 games

=== Manager ===
Sivasspor

- Turkish Cup: 2021–22

== See also ==
- List of one-club men
