= Onur Kayador =

Turkish footballer

Personal information
- Full name: Onur Alp Kayador
- Date of birth: 5 June 1955 (age 71)
- Place of birth: Istanbul, Turkey
- Position: Defender

Senior career*
Years	Team	Apps	(Gls)
1974–1987	Fenerbahçe	360	(17)
1975–1976	→Adana Demirspor (loan)	15	(1)

International career^{‡}
1980–1984	Turkey	6	(1)
- * Club domestic league appearances and goals as of 1 January 2021 ‡ National team caps and goals as of 1 January 2021

Onur Alp Kayador (born 5 June 1955) is a Turkish retired professional footballer who is most associated with the Turkish club Fenerbahçe. He also represented the Turkey national team. He played as a defender during his playing career.

== Honours ==
Fenerbahçe

- Süper Lig (4): 1973–74, 1974–75, 1982–83, 1984–85
- Turkish Cup (2): 1978–79, 1982–83
- Turkish Super Cup (2): 1983–84, 1984–85
- Prime Minister's Cup (1): 1979–80
- Fleet Cup (3): 1982–83, 1983–84, 1984–85
- TSYD Cup (4): 1975–76, 1980–81, 1982–83, 1986–87
