= Uğur Tütüneker =

Turkish footballer and manager

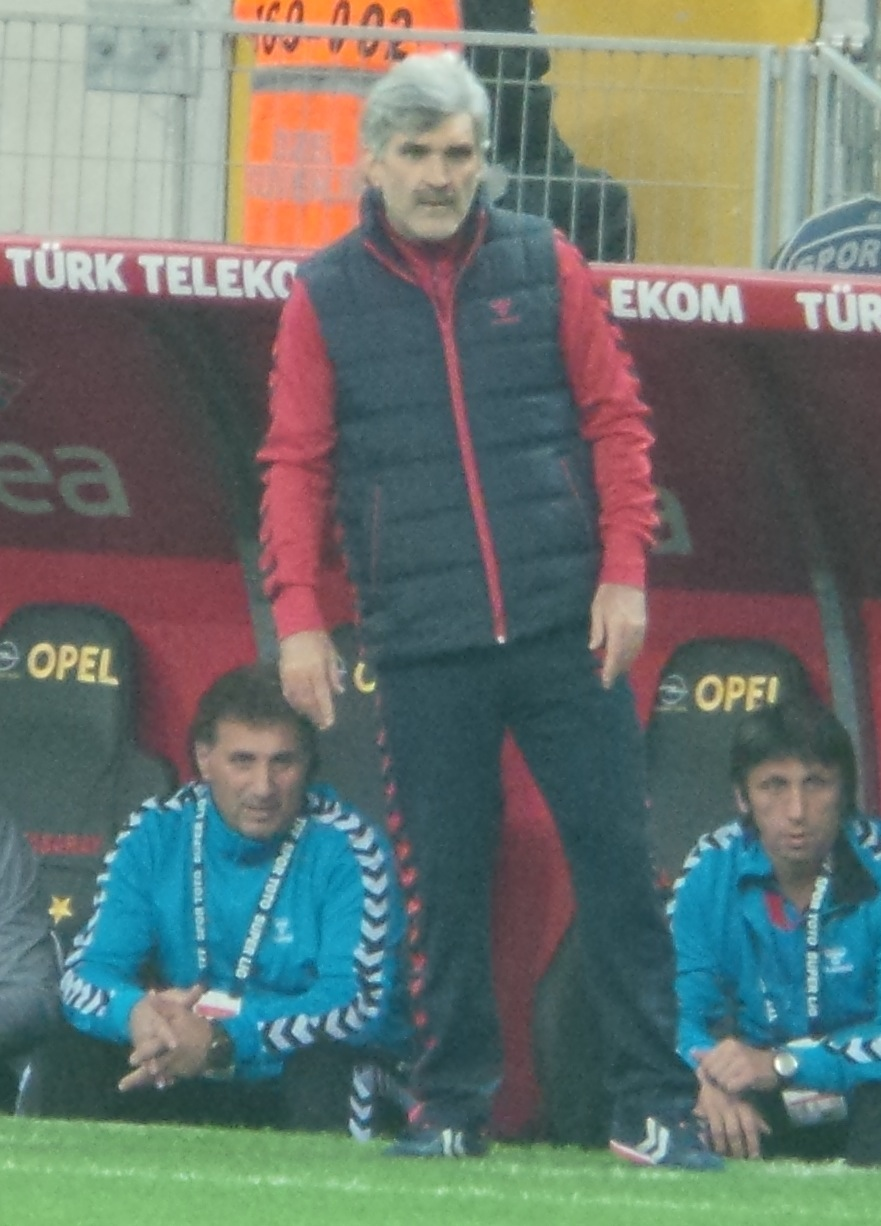

Personal information
- Full name: Uğur Tütüneker
- Date of birth: 2 August 1963 (age 63)
- Place of birth: Bursa, Turkey
- Position: Midfielder

Youth career
- Bayern Munich

Senior career*
Years	Team	Apps	(Gls)
1986–1996	Galatasaray	220	(42)
Total		220	(42)

International career
1986–1992	Turkey	19	(1)

Managerial career
- 1998–1999: Yimpaş Yozgatspor (assistant manager)
- 1999: Sarıyer
- 1999–2000: Siirtspor
- 2002–2003: Yimpaş Yozgatspor
- 2003: Kayserispor
- 2003–2004: Yimpaş Yozgatspor
- 2004–2005: İstanbul Büyükşehir Belediyespor
- 2005–2006: İstanbulspor
- 2007–2009: Kasımpaşa
- 2010–2011: Orduspor
- 2012–2013: Torku Konyaspor
- 2014: Çaykur Rizespor
- 2014: Kayseri Erciyesspor
- 2015: Osmanlıspor
- 2016: FC Wil 1900
- 2019–2020: Adana Demirspor
- * Club domestic league appearances and goals

Uğur Tütüneker (born 2 August 1963 in Bursa, Turkey) is a Turkish former footballer and manager who most recently served as the manager of Adana Demirspor. After migrating to Germany with his family, he started playing football at Bayern Munich youth academy.

== Club career ==
Uğur Tütüneker played for Bayern Munich before joining Galatasaray in July 1986. He was spotted by the legendary Germany coach Jupp Derwall who signed him for Galatasaray. He played at Galatasaray for the rest of his career, wearing the number 7 shirt. Uğur Tütüneker retired from professional football after the 1995–96 season. In 10 seasons at Galatasaray he has played in 222 competitive matches for Galatasaray, scoring 40 goals.

During his time with the club, he was one of the Galatasaray's key players, winning 4 Turkish League Championships, 2 Turkish Cup, 3 President's Cup, 1 Prime Minister's Cup and 3 Turkish Sports Writers' Cup.

Uğur Tütüneker has been praised for his technical ability, his creative playmaking, his dribbling skills as well as his crossing ability. He was one of the key players of 1988-89 Galatasaray squad that played Semi Finals in European Champions Cup. Uğur Tütüneker scored 2 and set 1 goal up for Galatasaray in their memorable 5-0 victory against Neuchatel Xamax.

== International career ==
Uğur Tütüneker played 18 matches for the Turkey national team scoring one goal. Uğur Tütüneker suffered injuries throughout his career, preventing him from maintaining a regular spot.

== Managerial career ==
He began coaching at Yimpaş Yozgatspor as manager assistant in 1998. He managed Siirtspor in 1999–2000 season and his team promoted to Turkish First League. He also managed Yimpaş Yozgatspor twice, Kayseri Erciyesspor, İstanbul Büyükşehir Belediyespor and İstanbulspor. He last managed Torku Konyaspor.

== Career statistics ==
=== Player ===
Club	Season	League		Cup		Europe		Total	
Club	Season	Apps	Goals	Apps	Goals	Apps	Goals	Apps	Goals
Bayern Munich II	1984–85	?	?	?	?	?	?	?	?
Bayern Munich II	1985–86	?	?	?	?	?	?	?	?
Bayern Munich II	Total	?	?	?	?	?	?	?	?
Galatasaray	1986–87	32	12	?	?	?	?	32	12
Galatasaray	1987–88	33	5	?	?	?	?	33	5
Galatasaray	1988–89	32	9	?	?	?	?	32	9
Galatasaray	1989–90	30	4	?	?	?	?	30	4
Galatasaray	1990–91	29	3	?	?	?	?	29	3
Galatasaray	1991–92	14	5	?	?	?	?	14	5
Galatasaray	1992–93	20	2	?	?	?	?	20	2
Galatasaray	1993–94	18	0	?	?	?	?	18	0
Galatasaray	1994–95	10	0	?	?	?	?	10	0
Galatasaray	1995–96	4	0	?	?	?	?	4	0
Galatasaray	Total	222	40	?	?	?	?	222	40
Career total		222	40	?	?	?	?	222	40

Turkey national team
Year	Apps	Goals
1986	2	0
1987	4	0
1988	1	0
1989	5	0
1990	1	0
1991	4	1
1992	1	0
Total	18	1

=== Manager ===
As of 21 October 2010

Team	From	To	Record				
Team	From	To	G	W	D	L	Win %
Yozgatspor	1998	1999					
Sarıyer	1999	1999					
Siirtspor	1999	2000					
Yozgatspor	2002	2003					
Kayserispor	2003	2003					
Yozgatspor	2003	2004					
İstanbul BB	2004	2005	33	11	10	12	33.33
İstanbulspor	2005	2006	12	4	3	5	33.33
Kasımpaşa	2007	2009	45	18	10	17	40.00
Orduspor	2010		9	5	3	1	55.56
Total			0	0	0	0	—
