= Naser Beadini =

Yugoslav footballer (1962–1992)

Personal information
- Date of birth: 20 May 1962
- Place of birth: Tetovo, FPR Yugoslavia
- Date of death: 16 January 1992 (aged 29)
- Place of death: Eskişehir, Turkey
- Position: Forward

Senior career*
Years	Team	Apps	(Gls)
1980–1984	Teteks	75	(17)
1985–1988	Eskişehirspor	56	(18)
1988–1990	Samsunspor	31	(3)
1990–1991	Eskişehirspor	28	(?)
1991–1992	Kayserispor	16	(4)
Total		206	(42)
- * Club domestic league appearances and goals

Naser Beadini (20 May 1962 – 16 January 1992) was a Yugoslav professional football forward who played for clubs in the former Yugoslavia and Turkey.

== Career ==
Born in Tetovo, SR Macedonia, back then within Yugoslavia, Beadini began playing football for local side FK Teteks. He helped Teteks gain promotion to the Yugoslav First League during his four seasons with the club.

Beadini joined Turkish Süper Lig side Eskişehirspor in 1985. After three seasons, ho moved to rivals Samsunspor for two seasons. He returned to Eskişehirspor for the following season, before moving to Kayserispor in 1991.

== Personal life ==
Beadini, together with another player and a trainer, died in a traffic accident near Eskişehir on 16 January 1992.
