= 1923–24 Istanbul Football League =

İstanbul Football League
- Season: 1923–24
- Champions: Beşiktaş JK (1st title)

The 1923–24 İstanbul Football League season was the 17th season of the league. Beşiktaş JK won the league for the first time. The tournament was single-elimination, not league as in the past.

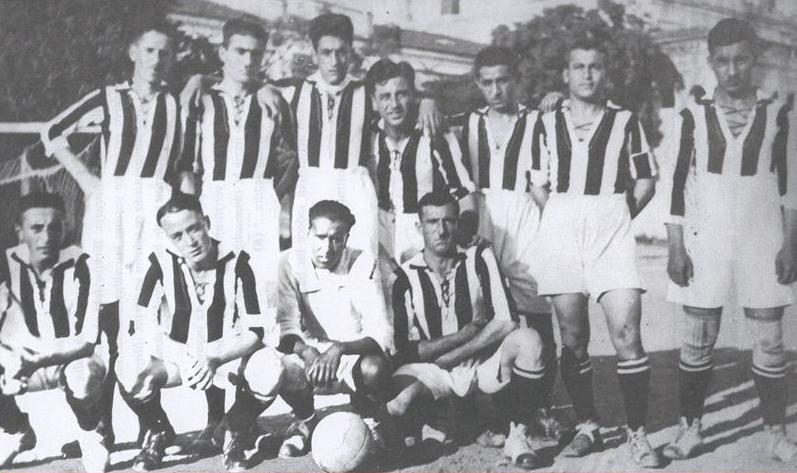
Istanbul League - Besiktas JK 1923-24 Champion

== Season ==
=== Semifinals ===
Team 1	Score	Team 2
Fenerbahçe SK (Turkey)	2-3	(Turkey) Galatasaray SK
Beşiktaş JK (Turkey)	3-1	(Turkey) Küçükçekmece SK

=== Final ===
Team 1	Score	Team 2
Beşiktaş JK (Turkey)	2-0	(Turkey) Galatasaray SK

== Participated teams ==
Fenerbahçe SK, Altınordu İdman Yurdu SK, Galatasaray SK, Vefa SK, Hilal SK, Küçükçekmece SK, Beşiktaş JK, Beylerbeyi SK, Üsküdar Anadolu SK, Nişantaşı SK, Topkapı İdman Yurdu SK, Darüşşafaka SK, İstiklal SK, Gürbüzler, Makrıköyspor, Kumkapı SK, Üsküdar, Türk İdman Ocağı SK, Fatih SK, Yenişafak SK, Kasımpaşa SK, Topkapı SK, Haliç, Fazilet
