= Feyyaz Uçar =

Turkish footballer (born 1963)

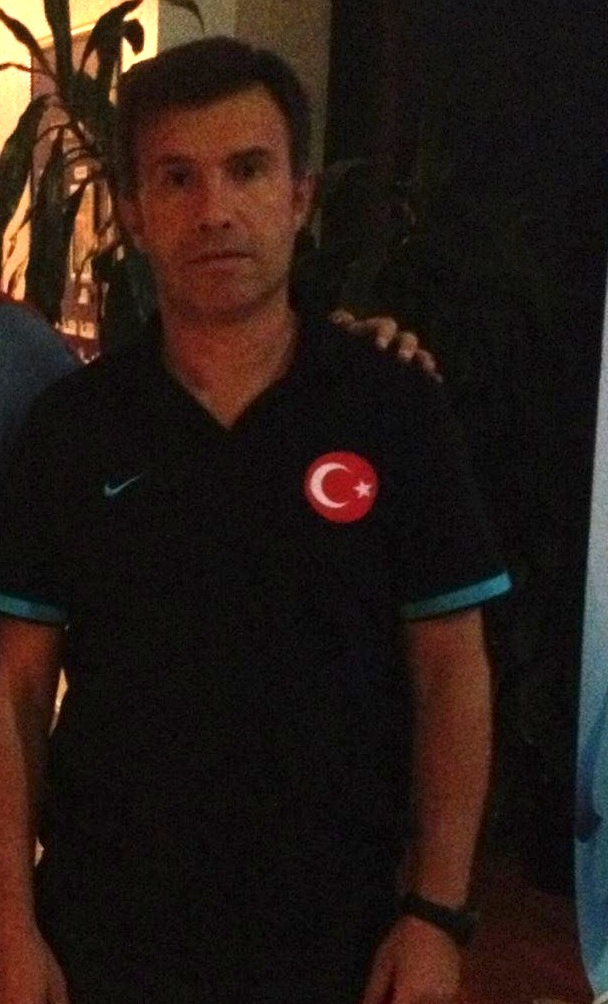
- Uçar in 2013

Personal information
- Date of birth: 27 October 1963 (age 62)
- Place of birth: Istanbul, Turkey
- Positions: Striker; winger

Youth career
- Avcılar Spor Klübü

Senior career*
Years	Team	Apps	(Gls)
1982–1994	Beşiktaş	320	(169)
1994–1996	Fenerbahçe	33	(12)
1995–1996	→ Antalyaspor (loan)	23	(8)
1996–1997	Kuşadasıspor	23	(6)
Total		399	(197)

International career
1988–1993	Turkey	28	(7)

Managerial career
- 2000–2001: Çanakkale Dardanel (assistant)
- 2001: Göztepe (assistant)
- 2002: Denizlispor (assistant)
- 2002–2005: Beşiktaş (assistant)
- 2005: Karşıyaka
- 2005–2006: Malatyaspor
- 2006–2007: Karşıyaka
- 2007: Mardinspor
- 2007–2009: Altay
- 2009–2013: Turkey U20
- 2013–2014: Altay
- 2015: Yeni Malatyaspor
- 2016–2017: Bandırmaspor
- 2018: Van BB
- 2019: Denizlispor (assistant)
- 2020: Vanspor FK
- * Club domestic league appearances and goals

Feyyaz Uçar (born 27 October 1963) is a Turkish former professional football player, who played as a striker, and more recently a coach.

== Career ==
Born in Istanbul, Turkey, Uçar started his football career at Avcılar Spor Klübü. Attracting various scouts while with Avcilar, he was transferred to Beşiktaş's junior squad only for new jerseys for the Avcılar team. After spending a season with the junior squad, Uçar made his professional debut with the A team in the 1981–1982 season. In the 1989–1990 season, he became the top scorer in the league with 28 goals. Uçar transferred to Fenerbahçe SK on 9 August 1994. He was loaned to Antalyaspor on 2 November 1995. Following year, he transferred to Kuşadası SK for one season. On 31 May 1997, he retired from active footballer.

Uçar served as an assistant coach with following the clubs: Çanakkale Dardanelspor (2000–2001), Göztepe SK (2001–2002), Denizlispor (2002). He came back to Beşiktaş J.K. to assist Mircea Lucescu and served for the club for four seasons. In February 2005, he signed a one-and-a-half-year contract to coach the Secondary League club Karşıyakaspor in İzmir. However, after two months he signed with the Süper Lig team Malatyaspor to replace Aykut Kocaman who resigned following a 1–0 home defeat by Rizespor. Uçar left Malatyaspor early in the 2005–2006 season after the team's disastrous start. His most recent managerial positions include Karşıyaka (2006–2007), Mardinspor (2007) and Altay (2007–2009).

== Honours ==
Beşiktaş

- Süper Lig: 1985–86, 1989–90, 1990–91, 1991–92
- Turkish Cup: 1988–89, 1989–90
- Turkish Super Cup: 1986, 1989, 1992
- Prime Minister's Cup: 1998
- TSYD Cup: 1983–84, 1984–85, 1988–89, 1989–90, 1990–91, 1993–94

Fenerbahçe

- TSYD Cup: 1994–95, 1995–96

Individual

- Süper Lig top scorer: 1989–90 (28 goals)
- Beşiktaş J.K. Squads of Century (Silver Team)

== See also ==
- Metin-Ali-Feyyaz
- Ali Gültiken
- Metin Tekin
