= Ali Gültiken =

Turkish footballer (born 1965)

Personal information
- Full name: Ali Kurtulus Gultiken
- Date of birth: 27 June 1965 (age 61)
- Place of birth: Istanbul, Turkey
- Position: Striker

Senior career*
Years	Team	Apps	(Gls)
1984–1995	Beşiktaş	262	(91)
1995–1996	Kayserispor	5	(0)
Total		267	(91)

International career
1987–1991	Turkey	7	(0)
- * Club domestic league appearances and goals

Ali Kurtuluş Gültiken (born 27 June 1965) is a former professional football player, manager, and scout. He is a part of the most famous trio of the Turkish football team Beşiktaş history alongside Metin Tekin and Feyyaz Uçar in the early 1990s.

== Career ==
Gültiken began his career in an amateur Istanbul club Bakırköy Yücespor Kulübü right before his transition to Beşiktaş in 1983. After his training process in youth system, he was promoted the senior squad in 1984–85 season. His usual position was right back whereas, coach of the team at that period Gordon Milne decided to make him play in forward line due to his decisive training mood and his ambition.

Gültiken reached the peak of his football with scoring 30 goals in 38 matches in 1987–88 season in which he had the second place in top scorers ranking after Tanju Çolak of Galatasaray. Thus, he had the 6th place in European Top Scorers Ranking in the same season.

During the 1991–92 season, when Beşiktaş had achieved the title with an undefeated team record, Gültiken scored a crucial goal against Galatasaray on 9 May 1992 before suffering a massive injury. He had a long break from football and he never recovered totally. After he returned to the team, he could not find a regular place in the line-up and eventually he had to leave the club at the age of 30 in 1995.

He joined Kayserispor in 1995 and spent the last season of his professional football career. He played only 5 matches with Kayserispor in 1995–96 season. His testimonial match was between Beşiktaş and İstanbulspor.

== After retirement ==
Gültiken had spent his time with investing the textile sector once again which he has had an initial attempt in his beginning time of football career. He created a brand with his name for men shirts. Afterwards, he worked as assistant coach of Rasim Kara in Yimpaş Yozgatspor. He also commented on various sports programs on TV and written to papers as columnist. He also worked as assistant coach again, this time in association of coach Mustafa Denizli at Vestel Manisaspor. Then, Denizli joined the Irani side PAS Tehran and Gültiken moved to Iran with him.

In 2007, Gültiken was hired by Beşiktaş again as football branch manager until his contract was terminated and Sinan Engin replaced him.

== Honours ==
Individual

- Beşiktaş J.K. Squads of Century (Silver Team)

== See also ==
- Metin-Ali-Feyyaz
