= 1985–86 1.Lig =

28th season of top-tier Turkish football

1.Lig
- Season: 1985–86
- Champions: Beşiktaş; 7th title
- Relegated: Sakaryaspor; Orduspor; Kayserispor
- European Cup: Beşiktaş
- Cup Winners' Cup: Bursaspor
- UEFA Cup: Galatasaray
- Matches: 342
- Goals: 808 (2.36 per match)
- Top goalscorer: Tanju Çolak (33 goals)

The 1985-86 Turkish First Football League season had 19 clubs participating. Beşiktaş J.K. won the championship. Galatasaray finished the season undefeated, however finished second on goal difference.

== League table ==
| Pos | Team | Pld | W | D | L | GF | GA | GD | Pts | Qualification or relegation |
|---|---|---|---|---|---|---|---|---|---|---|
| 1 | Beşiktaş (C) | 36 | 22 | 12 | 2 | 65 | 21 | +44 | 56 | Qualification to European Cup first round |
| 2 | Galatasaray | 36 | 20 | 16 | 0 | 57 | 20 | +37 | 56 | Qualification to UEFA Cup first round |
| 3 | Samsunspor | 36 | 19 | 10 | 7 | 57 | 25 | +32 | 48 | |
| 4 | Sarıyer | 36 | 14 | 15 | 7 | 36 | 23 | +13 | 43 | |
| 5 | Fenerbahçe | 36 | 13 | 16 | 7 | 40 | 32 | +8 | 42 | |
| 6 | MKE Ankaragücü | 36 | 14 | 13 | 9 | 47 | 44 | +3 | 41 | |
| 7 | Trabzonspor | 36 | 12 | 13 | 11 | 37 | 27 | +10 | 37 | |
| 8 | Altay | 36 | 11 | 12 | 13 | 41 | 45 | −4 | 34 | |
| 9 | Gençlerbirliği | 36 | 10 | 14 | 12 | 40 | 53 | −13 | 34 | |
| 10 | Eskişehirspor | 36 | 14 | 5 | 17 | 58 | 59 | −1 | 33 | |
| 11 | Zonguldakspor | 36 | 12 | 9 | 15 | 35 | 41 | −6 | 33 | |
| 12 | Denizlispor | 36 | 12 | 8 | 16 | 40 | 39 | +1 | 32 | |
| 13 | Malatyaspor | 36 | 10 | 12 | 14 | 45 | 50 | −5 | 32 | |
| 14 | Kocaelispor | 36 | 12 | 8 | 16 | 37 | 47 | −10 | 32 | |
| 15 | Çaykur Rizespor | 36 | 11 | 10 | 15 | 28 | 40 | −12 | 32 | |
| 16 | Bursaspor | 36 | 9 | 13 | 14 | 36 | 40 | −4 | 31 | Qualification to Cup Winners' Cup first round |
| 17 | Sakaryaspor (R) | 36 | 11 | 5 | 20 | 52 | 70 | −18 | 27 | Relegation to Turkish Second Football League |
| 18 | Orduspor (R) | 36 | 8 | 6 | 22 | 30 | 65 | −35 | 22 | Relegation to Turkish Second Football League |
| 19 | Kayserispor (R) | 36 | 4 | 11 | 21 | 27 | 67 | −40 | 19 | Relegation to Turkish Second Football League |

Rules for classification: 1) points; 2) goal difference; 3) number of goals scored.
(C) Champions; (R) Relegated

== Results ==
| Home \ Away | ALT | BJK | BUR | DEN | ESK | FNB | GAL | GEN | KAY | KOC | MAL | AGÜ | ORD | RİZ | SAK | SAM | SAR | TRA | ZON |
|---|---|---|---|---|---|---|---|---|---|---|---|---|---|---|---|---|---|---|---|
| Altay | | 1–1 | 0–0 | 1–0 | 2–2 | 1–1 | 0–1 | 2–0 | 2–1 | 1–1 | 2–0 | 3–0 | 3–0 | 1–1 | 2–1 | 3–1 | 1–0 | 0–0 | 0–0 |
| Beşiktaş | 3–3 | | 0–0 | 1–0 | 3–2 | 3–1 | 0–0 | 1–1 | 3–0 | 3–0 | 4–0 | 3–0 | 5–1 | 4–1 | 6–0 | 1–1 | 2–0 | 1–0 | 1–0 |
| Bursaspor | 2–0 | 2–2 | | 1–1 | 3–0 | 1–1 | 0–1 | 2–2 | 1–2 | 1–0 | 5–1 | 1–1 | 2–0 | 1–1 | 3–0 | 1–0 | 1–3 | 0–0 | 2–0 |
| Denizlispor | 4–0 | 1–0 | 1–0 | | 3–1 | 2–1 | 1–2 | 2–0 | 0–0 | 0–0 | 2–0 | 0–0 | 5–1 | 1–0 | 1–1 | 2–0 | 0–1 | 2–0 | 1–1 |
| Eskişehirspor | 3–3 | 0–2 | 2–0 | 4–1 | | 3–1 | 1–1 | 1–2 | 4–0 | 3–0 | 2–1 | 2–3 | 3–2 | 2–1 | 2–0 | 2–1 | 1–1 | 1–1 | 1–2 |
| Fenerbahçe | 1–0 | 0–0 | 0–0 | 5–2 | 1–0 | | 1–1 | 1–1 | 3–2 | 3–0 | 0–0 | 1–0 | 2–0 | 1–0 | 1–0 | 0–1 | 2–0 | 0–0 | 3–1 |
| Galatasaray | 5–1 | 1–1 | 4–0 | 2–1 | 2–1 | 0–0 | | 0–0 | 5–2 | 1–1 | 1–1 | 5–2 | 3–2 | 2–0 | 3–0 | 3–0 | 1–0 | 0–0 | 1–0 |
| Gençlerbirliği | 1–2 | 1–2 | 1–1 | 2–1 | 1–0 | 2–2 | 0–1 | | 2–1 | 2–0 | 4–3 | 1–3 | 2–2 | 2–1 | 1–0 | 1–1 | 0–0 | 3–2 | 1–1 |
| Kayserispor | 0–1 | 1–1 | 0–0 | 0–2 | 0–3 | 3–3 | 0–0 | 1–1 | | 0–1 | 1–1 | 0–1 | 4–1 | 1–1 | 2–4 | 0–5 | 1–1 | 1–0 | 0–0 |
| Kocaelispor | 1–0 | 0–1 | 1–0 | 2–1 | 3–1 | 1–0 | 0–1 | 2–0 | 0–1 | | 0–0 | 3–0 | 3–1 | 0–1 | 1–1 | 0–4 | 1–4 | 1–0 | 1–1 |
| Malatyaspor | 3–1 | 1–2 | 3–2 | 0–0 | 3–2 | 0–0 | 1–1 | 4–1 | 2–0 | 1–2 | | 1–1 | 0–0 | 4–1 | 2–0 | 2–0 | 1–1 | 1–1 | 2–1 |
| MKE Ankaragücü | 1–0 | 0–0 | 0–0 | 2–0 | 1–2 | 0–0 | 1–1 | 2–2 | 2–0 | 3–2 | 1–3 | | 1–0 | 1–1 | 3–1 | 0–1 | 3–3 | 1–0 | 3–1 |
| Orduspor | 2–1 | 0–2 | 0–1 | 2–1 | 1–2 | 0–0 | 0–0 | 0–1 | 1–1 | 0–2 | 4–3 | 2–3 | | 1–0 | 1–1 | 1–2 | 1–0 | 1–0 | 1–0 |
| Rizespor | 2–1 | 1–2 | 2–1 | 1–0 | 1–2 | 1–1 | 0–2 | 0–0 | 1–0 | 2–1 | 1–0 | 0–1 | 2–1 | | 1–0 | 0–0 | 0–0 | 0–0 | 2–0 |
| Sakaryaspor | 2–1 | 1–3 | 3–2 | 3–1 | 6–2 | 1–2 | 2–4 | 5–1 | 2–0 | 3–3 | 1–0 | 2–5 | 1–0 | 1–2 | | 0–0 | 1–0 | 1–2 | 0–1 |
| Samsunspor | 2–0 | 1–0 | 3–0 | 2–1 | 1–0 | 4–0 | 1–1 | 0–0 | 3–0 | 3–2 | 2–0 | 0–0 | 0–1 | 3–0 | 4–1 | | 1–0 | 1–1 | 6–0 |
| Sarıyer | 0–0 | 0–0 | 1–0 | 1–0 | 3–1 | 1–1 | 0–0 | 1–0 | 3–0 | 1–0 | 0–0 | 0–0 | 2–0 | 1–0 | 3–2 | 1–1 | | 0–0 | 2–0 |
| Trabzonspor | 0–0 | 0–1 | 3–0 | 2–0 | 2–0 | 1–0 | 0–1 | 3–0 | 4–2 | 1–0 | 2–1 | 1–0 | 4–0 | 0–0 | 3–4 | 1–1 | 1–1 | | 2–1 |
| Zonguldakspor | 3–2 | 0–1 | 1–0 | 0–0 | 1–0 | 0–1 | 0–0 | 3–1 | 3–0 | 2–2 | 2–0 | 2–2 | 3–0 | 2–0 | 2–1 | 0–1 | 0–1 | 1–0 | |

Source: TFF, Mackolik
Legend: Blue = home team win; Yellow = draw; Red = away team win.
