= Fleet Cup =

Donanma Kupası
- Founded: 1982
- Abolished: 1986
- Region: Turkey
- Last champions: Beşiktaş (1st title)
- Most championships: Fenerbahçe (4 titles)

The Fleet Cup (Turkish: Donanma Kupası) was a football competition in Turkey. It was played in 1982 and between 1986. Fenerbahçe holds the record for most trophies in this competition with four titles to its name.

== Champions ==
| Year | Champion |
|---|---|
| 1982 | Fenerbahçe |
| 1983 | Fenerbahçe |
| 1984 | Fenerbahçe |
| 1985 | Fenerbahçe |
| 1986 | Beşiktaş |

== Titles ==
| Club | Titles |
|---|---|
| Fenerbahçe | 4 |
| Beşiktaş | 1 |
