= 1986–87 1.Lig =

29th season of top-tier Turkish football

1.Lig
- Season: 1986–87
- Champions: Galatasaray; 7th title
- Relegated: Antalyaspor; Diyarbakırspor
- European Cup: Galatasaray
- Cup Winners' Cup: Gençlerbirliği
- UEFA Cup: Beşiktaş
- Matches: 342
- Goals: 776 (2.27 per match)
- Top goalscorer: Tanju Çolak (25 goals)

Statistics of Turkish First Football League in season 1986/1987.

== Overview ==
Nineteen clubs participated, and Galatasaray S.K. won the championship.

== League table ==
Pos	Team	Pld	W	D	L	GF	GA	GD	Pts	Qualification or relegation
1	Galatasaray (C)	36	23	8	5	55	24	+31	54	Qualification to European Cup first round
2	Beşiktaş	36	23	7	6	67	26	+41	53	Qualification to UEFA Cup first round
3	Samsunspor	36	19	11	6	56	22	+34	49	Invitation to Balkans Cup
4	Trabzonspor	36	18	13	5	49	21	+28	49	
5	Fenerbahçe	36	13	13	10	46	39	+7	39	
6	Malatyaspor	36	17	5	14	39	35	+4	39	
7	Denizlispor	36	11	14	11	41	35	+6	36	
8	Altay	36	13	10	13	46	47	−1	36	
9	Eskişehirspor	36	10	14	12	35	31	+4	34	Invitation to Balkans Cup
10	MKE Ankaragücü	36	12	10	14	37	43	−6	34	
11	Zonguldakspor	36	9	15	12	29	35	−6	33	
12	Gençlerbirliği	36	8	17	11	32	39	−7	33	Qualification to Cup Winners' Cup first round
13	Çaykur Rizespor	36	13	7	16	37	57	−20	33	
14	Sarıyer	36	11	10	15	42	39	+3	32	
15	Boluspor	36	9	14	13	38	51	−13	32	
16	Kocaelispor	36	10	11	15	39	50	−11	31	
17	Bursaspor	36	10	8	18	29	40	−11	28	
18	Antalyaspor (R)	36	8	8	20	37	68	−31	24	Relegation to Turkish Second Football League
19	Diyarbakırspor (R)	36	4	7	25	22	74	−52	15	Relegation to Turkish Second Football League

Rules for classification: 1) points; 2) goal difference; 3) number of goals scored.
(C) Champions; (R) Relegated

== Results ==
Home \ Away	ALT	ANT	BJK	BOL	BUR	DEN	DYB	ESK	FNB	GAL	GEN	KOC	MAL	AGÜ	RİZ	SAM	SAR	TRA	ZON
Altay		2–0	1–2	1–1	2–1	1–0	2–0	0–0	1–1	0–2	2–1	5–4	1–1	2–0	2–3	2–4	2–1	1–0	1–0
Antalyaspor	3–3		0–1	2–6	2–1	1–1	2–0	2–1	0–0	1–3	2–2	0–0	1–0	1–1	2–0	0–2	0–0	0–1	1–0
Beşiktaş	1–0	5–1		1–0	2–2	1–1	4–1	0–0	4–0	0–2	5–1	1–1	3–0	1–0	3–0	2–2	3–1	3–0	1–0
Boluspor	3–2	0–3	1–0		2–1	0–3	0–0	0–0	2–1	0–1	2–2	0–0	1–2	1–1	3–0	0–0	2–0	1–2	1–1
Bursaspor	0–4	3–2	0–2	1–0		2–0	2–0	2–0	0–1	1–0	2–0	0–1	0–2	2–2	2–0	0–1	1–0	0–1	0–0
Denizlispor	4–0	1–0	0–2	3–1	0–0		1–0	1–1	2–2	1–1	3–1	3–2	1–0	1–1	3–0	1–1	2–0	0–0	0–1
Diyarbakırspor	1–2	0–3	0–1	0–1	2–1	2–2		0–2	1–1	0–1	0–0	2–0	0–1	1–0	1–2	1–0	0–1	1–4	0–0
Eskişehirspor	0–1	7–3	2–3	1–1	1–1	0–0	4–0		0–0	1–1	0–0	3–0	1–1	0–0	2–1	0–0	0–0	2–0	2–0
Fenerbahçe	1–1	2–0	0–1	3–0	1–0	3–1	3–2	4–1		1–2	1–1	2–1	2–1	2–2	6–0	0–1	1–0	0–0	2–2
Galatasaray	1–0	4–0	2–2	1–1	1–0	1–0	3–0	2–1	0–1		2–2	2–1	2–1	2–0	2–0	4–1	1–1	0–1	2–1
Gençlerbirliği	2–0	2–0	0–1	0–0	0–1	0–0	1–1	1–0	1–1	1–0		2–1	3–0	1–1	3–0	0–0	0–0	0–2	1–0
Kocaelispor	1–1	2–2	1–2	4–2	2–1	1–0	4–0	1–0	1–0	0–2	2–0		2–1	0–0	1–0	0–1	2–2	0–0	0–0
Malatyaspor	1–0	2–1	1–0	2–1	2–0	1–0	1–0	0–1	1–0	0–1	0–0	2–2		2–1	7–4	1–0	1–0	0–1	0–1
MKE Ankaragücü	1–0	3–1	1–0	0–0	1–0	2–4	2–1	1–0	0–1	1–2	2–1	2–0	0–3		3–2	0–1	2–0	2–1	5–2
Rizespor	2–1	3–0	1–0	2–2	1–1	1–1	3–1	1–0	2–1	2–0	0–0	2–0	0–1	2–0		0–0	1–0	0–0	0–0
Samsunspor	2–0	3–0	2–2	3–0	1–1	1–0	5–1	0–1	4–0	1–1	3–0	4–0	0–0	2–0	3–0		0–1	3–1	0–0
Sarıyer	1–1	1–0	1–4	6–0	1–0	1–1	5–0	0–1	3–1	1–2	1–1	3–0	2–1	1–0	0–2	3–2		1–1	2–1
Trabzonspor	1–1	4–1	1–0	1–1	3–0	3–0	5–1	3–0	1–1	0–0	0–0	1–1	1–0	3–0	3–0	1–0	2–0		0–0
Zonguldakspor	0–0	2–0	0–4	1–2	0–0	1–0	2–2	1–0	0–0	0–2	4–2	2–1	2–0	1–1	3–0	0–2	0–0	1–1	

Source: TFF, Mackolik
Legend: Blue = home team win; Yellow = draw; Red = away team win.

== Controversy ==
In March 2020, statements from former Denizlispor player Mesut Bakkal’s autobiography, which he later said had been prepared for family and close friends and not for commercial publication, came to public attention.

Bakkal stated that Denizlispor players had been given doping substances and incentive bonuses (Teşvik primleri) before their penultimate league match against Beşiktaş J.K. The match ended in a 1–1 draw, and Galatasaray later won the championship by one point ahead of Beşiktaş.

Following Bakkal's statements, Beşiktaş officially requested that the Turkish Football Federation (TFF) retroactively award the club a 3–0 victory in the match and recognize Beşiktaş as the 1986–87 Turkish champions. Bakkal defended the incentive bonus payments by stating that they had not been prohibited by TFF regulations at the time.

In June 2020, the TFF rejected Beşiktaş's request on the grounds of the statute of limitations.

Galatasaray disputed the allegations and stated that the claims were "baseless accusations" aimed at damaging the club's history and reputation. The club also announced that legal action had been initiated regarding the statements made in Bakkal's book.

Beşiktaş responded by defending its application to the TFF and stated that the matter should be evaluated by the federation rather than through public accusations between clubs.

== Weblinks ==
- Turkey - List of final tables (RSSSF)
- Türkiye 1.Ligi - 1986/1987 (Mackolik)
