= Metin Tekin =

Turkish footballer (born 1964)

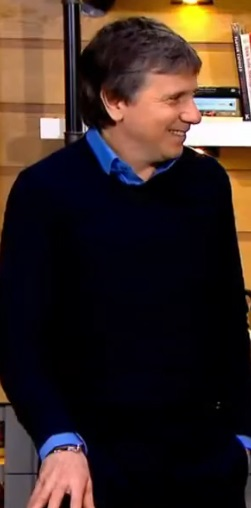

Personal information
- Date of birth: 8 May 1964 (age 62)
- Place of birth: Kocaeli, Turkey
- Height: 1.81 m (5 ft 11 in)
- Positions: Striker; winger

Youth career
- 1974–1981: Kocaelispor
- 1981–1982: Beşiktaş A2

Senior career*
Years	Team	Apps	(Gls)
1982–1997	Beşiktaş	340	(77)
1997	→ Vanspor (loan)	11	(1)
Total		351	(78)

International career
1980–1982	Turkey U18	11	(0)
1983–1984	Turkey U21	4	(0)
1983–1995	Turkey	34	(2)

Managerial career
- 1999–2000: Samsunspor (assistant coach)
- 2000–2001: Gaziantepspor (assistant coach)
- 2001: Malatyaspor (assistant coach)
- 2002: Gençlerbirliği (assistant coach)
- 2002–2003: Çanakkale Dardanelspor
- 2003–2004: Altay (assistant coach)
- 2005–2009: Turkey (assistant coach)
- * Club domestic league appearances and goals

Metin Tekin (born 8 May 1964) is a Turkish football manager and former professional player who played as a striker or winger. As a player, he spent most of his career with Beşiktaş JK.

== Career statistics ==
=== Club ===
Appearances and goals by club, season and competition
Club	Season	League			National cup		Continental		Other		Total	
Club	Season	Division	Apps	Goals	Apps	Goals	Apps	Goals	Apps	Goals	Apps	Goals
Beşiktaş	1982–83	1. Lig	20	1	6	0	0	3	2 (Note: Appearance(s) in Fleet Cup)	0	29	3
Beşiktaş	1983–84	1. Lig	29	5	9	1	0	2	0	0	40	6
Beşiktaş	1984–85	1. Lig	33	6	7	0	2	1	3	1	45	8
Beşiktaş	1985–86	1. Lig	32	13	3	1	1	0	3 (Note: Appearances in Turkish Super Cup and Fleet Cup)	1	39	15
Beşiktaş	1986–87	1. Lig	33	9	2	0	4	1	1 (Note: Appearance(s) in Prime Minister's Cup)	0	40	10
Beşiktaş	1987–88	1. Lig	22	2	5	1	2	0	0	0	29	3
Beşiktaş	1988–89	1. Lig	13	0	9	3	0	0	0	0	22	3
Beşiktaş	1989–90	1. Lig	29	13	4	2	1	0	1 (Note: Appearance in Turkish Super Cup)	2	35	17
Beşiktaş	1990–91	1. Lig	26	7	1	1	2	0	1	0	30	8
Beşiktaş	1991–92	1. Lig	19	7	1	0	2	1	0	0	22	8
Beşiktaş	1992–93	1. Lig	21	7	2	0	1	1	0	0	24	8
Beşiktaş	1993–94	1. Lig	22	1	5	2	2	2	1	1	30	6
Beşiktaş	1994–95	1. Lig	24	5	0	0	4	0	0	0	28	5
Beşiktaş	1995–96	1. Lig	13	1	2	0	0	0	0	0	15	1
Beşiktaş	1996–97	1. Lig	4	0	0	0	2	0	0	0	6	0
Beşiktaş	Total		340	77	56	11	23	11	12	5	431	104
Vanspor (loan)	1996–97	1. Lig	11	1	0	0	0	0	0	0	11	1
Career total			351	78	56	11	23	11	12	5	442	105

=== International ===
Appearances and goals by national team and year
National team	Year	Apps	Goals
Turkey	1983	5	1
Turkey	1984	7	0
Turkey	1985	7	1
Turkey	1986	3	0
Turkey	1987	2	0
Turkey	1988	1	0
Turkey	1989	2	0
Turkey	1990	4	0
Turkey	1991	2	0
Turkey	1995	1	0
Turkey	Total	34	2

Scores and results list Turkey's goal tally first, score column indicates score after each Tekin goal.

List of international goals scored by Metin Tekin
No.	Date	Venue	Opponent	Score	Result	Competition	Ref.
1	11 May 1983	Qemal Stafa Stadium, Tirana, Albania	Albania	1–0	1–0	UEFA Euro 1984 qualifying	
2	13 November 1985	İzmir Atatürk Stadium, İzmir, Turkey	Romania	1–3	1–3	1986 FIFA World Cup qualification	

== Individual ==
- Beşiktaş J.K. Squads of Century (Golden Team)
