= 1991–92 1.Lig =

34th season of top-tier Turkish football

1.Lig
- Season: 1991–92
- Champions: Beşiktaş (10th title)
- Relegated: Boluspor; Adana Demirspor; Samsunspor
- Champions League: Beşiktaş
- Cup Winners' Cup: Trabzonspor
- UEFA Cup: Fenerbahçe; Galatasaray
- Matches played: 240
- Goals scored: 677 (2.82 per match)
- Top goalscorer: Aykut Kocaman (25 goals)

The following are the statistics of the Turkish First Football League in season 1991/1992.

== Overview ==
It was contested by 16 teams, and Beşiktaş J.K. won the championship. This is the only season in the Turkish League, when a team has won the championship without a loss.

== League table ==
Pos	Team	Pld	W	D	L	GF	GA	GD	Pts	Qualification or relegation
1	Beşiktaş (C)	30	23	7	0	58	20	+38	76	Qualification to Champions League first round
2	Fenerbahçe	30	23	2	5	81	35	+46	71	Qualification to UEFA Cup first round
3	Galatasaray	30	19	3	8	54	35	+19	60	Qualification to UEFA Cup first round
4	Trabzonspor	30	16	7	7	56	31	+25	55	Qualification to Cup Winners' Cup first round
5	Aydınspor	30	13	5	12	38	39	−1	44	
6	Bursaspor	30	10	10	10	44	43	+1	40	
7	Sarıyer	30	11	5	14	34	44	−10	38	
8	MKE Ankaragücü	30	9	10	11	42	44	−2	37	
9	Altay	30	10	6	14	34	46	−12	36	
10	Gençlerbirliği	30	7	13	10	40	46	−6	34	
11	Bakırköyspor	30	8	9	13	42	46	−4	33	
12	Konyaspor	30	8	8	14	28	34	−6	32	
13	Gaziantepspor	30	7	11	12	34	53	−19	32	
14	Boluspor (R)	30	8	7	15	29	38	−9	31	Relegation to Turkish Second Football League
15	Adana Demirspor (R)	30	5	9	16	27	61	−34	24	Relegation to Turkish Second Football League
16	Samsunspor (R)	30	4	6	20	36	62	−26	18	Relegation to Turkish Second Football League

Rules for classification: 1) points; 2) goal difference; 3) number of goals scored.
(C) Champions; (R) Relegated

Galatasaray qualified to UEFA following the Albanian renounce.

== Results ==
Home \ Away	ADS	ALT	AYD	BAK	BJK	BOL	BUR	FNB	GAL	GAZ	GEN	KON	AGÜ	SAM	SAR	TRA
Adana Demirspor		1–2	1–0	2–3	0–1	3–1	2–1	1–2	1–2	0–1	0–0	1–0	1–1	1–0	1–1	0–0
Altay	4–3		3–1	1–0	1–2	1–0	1–0	0–2	0–1	1–1	3–2	2–0	1–3	3–3	1–0	0–1
Aydınspor	1–1	2–1		1–0	1–2	2–1	3–1	0–3	1–1	2–2	1–2	2–0	1–0	2–1	2–0	1–2
Bakırköyspor	1–1	1–1	2–0		0–0	2–0	2–2	0–1	3–5	2–2	4–1	0–0	4–1	2–0	1–2	1–2
Beşiktaş	1–1	3–1	3–0	4–2		1–0	0–0	1–0	4–3	2–0	1–1	1–0	1–0	5–1	1–0	3–2
Boluspor	3–0	4–1	0–2	4–0	0–0		2–1	0–1	0–2	1–1	2–1	0–0	1–1	2–0	2–1	0–1
Bursaspor	4–0	0–0	1–1	2–2	0–2	1–2		1–2	0–4	4–1	1–1	1–0	1–0	2–0	4–0	2–1
Fenerbahçe	6–1	2–1	1–2	4–2	2–2	2–0	3–1		5–2	8–4	3–1	4–1	4–1	2–0	3–0	3–2
Galatasaray	2–1	3–1	1–3	2–1	0–1	2–1	1–2	0–2		0–1	3–1	2–1	1–0	3–1	2–0	1–1
Gaziantepspor	2–1	4–1	0–4	1–1	1–2	2–0	1–1	0–0	0–1		0–1	2–2	0–0	4–2	0–0	2–1
Gençlerbirliği	1–1	0–0	2–0	2–4	0–0	3–0	2–3	3–2	0–0	1–1		1–1	2–4	2–1	4–3	0–0
Konyaspor	8–0	2–0	1–0	1–4	0–3	0–0	0–0	1–2	0–2	3–0	1–0		2–4	2–0	1–0	0–1
MKE Ankaragücü	1–1	3–1	0–1	2–0	1–2	3–0	3–3	0–3	0–3	4–0	3–3	0–0		2–2	3–1	0–0
Samsunspor	4–0	1–1	1–1	0–1	1–2	2–2	4–0	2–5	1–2	1–0	2–2	2–1	1–2		0–2	1–3
Sarıyer	4–1	1–0	3–1	1–0	0–5	2–1	1–3	4–1	1–0	2–0	1–1	0–1	0–0	2–1		1–3
Trabzonspor	4–0	0–1	3–0	2–1	2–3	0–0	2–2	3–2	2–3	5–1	1–0	4–0	4–0	4–1	1–1	

Source: TFF, Mackolik
Legend: Blue = home team win; Yellow = draw; Red = away team win.

== Top scorers ==
Rank	Player	Club	Goals
1	(Turkey) Aykut Kocaman	Fenerbahçe	25
2	(Turkey) Tanju Çolak	Fenerbahçe	23
3	(Turkey) Feyyaz Uçar	Beşiktaş	19
4	(Turkey) Hami Mandıralı	Trabzonspor	18
5	(Turkey) Zafer Tüzün	Bakırköyspor	17
5	(Bosnia and Herzegovina) Sead Šabotić	Ankaragücü	17
7	(Poland) Roman Kosecki	Galatasaray	15
8	(Turkey) Mehmet Özdilek	Beşiktaş	12
9	(Turkey) Ünal Karaman	Trabzonspor	11
10	(Turkey) Avni Okumuş	Gençlerbirliği	9
10	(Brazil) Gérson Caçapa	Fenerbahçe	9
10	(Algeria) Noureddine Neggazi	Aydınspor	9
