= TSYD Cup =

Football competition in Turkey

The TSYD Cup (Turkish: Türk Spor Yazarları Derneği Kupası, Turkish Sports Writers Association Cup) was a friendly football competition in Turkey. The tournament started in 1963. It was played throughout six regions in Turkey: Adana, Ankara, Istanbul, İzmir, Konya, and Trabzon. The competition's major leg which was played between the "Big Three"; Fenerbahçe, Galatasaray, and Beşiktaş became defunct in 1999. The competition is still running in Ankara with four clubs, prior to the first week of each season.

The TSYD Challenge Cup (Turkish: Çalenç Kupası) was awarded to clubs which won the TSYD Cup three times within a five-year span.

== Winners ==
=== Adana ===
Club	Titles	Years won
Adana Demirspor	9	1977, 1980, 1981, 1985, 1986, 1993, 1994, 1997, 2002
Adanaspor	8	1978, 1982, 1987, 1988, 1989, 1992, 1995, 2001
Gaziantepspor	5	1979, 1990, 1991, 1996
İskenderunspor	2	1983, 1984
İstanbulspor	1	2000

=== Ankara ===
Club	Titles	Years won
MKE Ankaragücü	19	1929, 1957, 1967, 1968, 1970, 1971, 1972, 1974, 1976, 1978, 1980, 1981, 1982, 1983, 1984, 1991, 1997, 2000, 2001
Gençlerbirliği	12	1960, 1961, 1969, 1979, 1985, 1986, 1989, 1993, 1994, 1998, 2002, 2003
Gençlerbirliği Oftaş	1	1958
Demir SK	1	1959
Eskişehirspor	1	1973
Boluspor	1	1975
Zonguldakspor	1	1977
Malatyaspor	1	1987
Konyaspor	1	1988
Gaziantepspor	1	1990
Trabzonspor	1	1992
Kayserispor	1	1995
İstanbulspor	1	1996
Samsunspor	1	1999
Ankaraspor	1	2004

=== Istanbul ===
Club	Titles	Years won
Fenerbahçe	12	1969, 1973, 1975, 1976, 1978, 1979, 1980, 1982, 1985, 1986, 1994, 1995
Beşiktaş	12	1964, 1965, 1971, 1972, 1974, 1983, 1984, 1988, 1989, 1990, 1993, 1996
Galatasaray	12	1963, 1966, 1967, 1970, 1977, 1981, 1987, 1991, 1992, 1997, 1998, 1999

=== İzmir ===
Club	Titles	Years won
Altay	14	1968, 1970, 1971, 1972, 1973, 1975, 1980, 1981, 1983, 1986, 1987, 1988, 1999, 2000
Göztepe	9	1965, 1967, 1969, 1976, 1977, 1978, 1990, 1995, 2002
Karşıyaka	8	1982, 1985, 1989, 1991, 1992, 1993, 1994, 1996
Denizlispor	3	1997, 1998, 2001
Altınordu	2	1979, 1984

=== Konya ===
Club	Titles	Years won
Konyaspor	4	1999, 2000, 2001, 2002
Gençlerbirliği	1	1998

=== Karadeniz ===
Club	Titles	Years won
Trabzonspor	2	1998, 2002
Çaykur Rizespor	1	2000
Akçaabat Sebatspor	1	2001

== TSYD Challenge Cup ==
Club	Titles	Years won
Fenerbahçe	2	1976, 1980
Beşiktaş	1	1990
