= 1989–90 1.Lig =

32nd season of top-tier Turkish football

1.Lig
- Season: 1989–90
- Champions: Beşiktaş; 8th title
- Relegated: Malatyaspor; Altay; Samsunspor; Adana Demirspor; Sakaryaspor
- European Cup: Beşiktaş
- Cup Winners' Cup: Trabzonspor
- UEFA Cup: Fenerbahçe
- Matches played: 306
- Goals scored: 819 (2.68 per match)
- Top goalscorer: Feyyaz Uçar (28 goals)

Statistics of the Turkish First Football League in season 1989/1990.

== Overview ==
It was contested by 18 teams, and Beşiktaş J.K. won the championship.

== League table ==
Pos	Team	Pld	W	D	L	GF	GA	GD	Pts	Qualification or relegation
1	Beşiktaş (C)	34	23	6	5	77	20	+57	75	Qualification to European Cup first round
2	Fenerbahçe	34	22	4	8	70	38	+32	70	Qualification to UEFA Cup first round
3	Trabzonspor	34	20	8	6	58	28	+30	68	Qualification to Cup Winners' Cup first round
4	Galatasaray	34	19	6	9	59	26	+33	63	Invitation to Balkans Cup
5	Sarıyer	34	16	11	7	52	37	+15	59	
6	Bursaspor	34	13	8	13	46	45	+1	47	
7	Konyaspor	34	13	7	14	41	42	−1	46	
8	Karşıyaka	34	14	4	16	47	50	−3	46	
9	MKE Ankaragücü	34	13	7	14	32	42	−10	46	
10	Zeytinburnuspor	34	13	6	15	39	39	0	45	
11	Gençlerbirliği	34	11	12	11	50	51	−1	45	
12	Adanaspor	34	12	9	13	48	53	−5	45	
13	Boluspor	34	11	12	11	32	39	−7	45	
14	Malatyaspor (R)	34	12	8	14	43	46	−3	44	Relegation to Turkish Second Football League
15	Altay (R)	34	9	8	17	38	57	−19	35	Relegation to Turkish Second Football League
16	Samsunspor (R)	34	7	6	21	24	50	−26	27	Relegation to Turkish Second Football League
17	Adana Demirspor (R)	34	5	8	21	30	83	−53	23	Relegation to Turkish Second Football League
18	Sakaryaspor (R)	34	5	6	23	33	73	−40	21	Relegation to Turkish Second Football League

Rules for classification: 1) points; 2) goal difference; 3) number of goals scored.
(C) Champions; (R) Relegated

== Results ==
Home \ Away	ADS	ADA	ALT	BJK	BOL	BUR	FNB	GAL	GEN	KSK	KON	MAL	AGÜ	SAK	SAM	SAR	TRA	ZEY
Adana Demirspor		2–3	2–2	1–1	0–2	1–1	1–3	1–0	1–1	1–2	1–5	1–0	1–1	2–1	1–0	0–3	0–1	2–1
Adanaspor	3–3		3–1	1–1	2–0	1–1	1–4	1–0	3–0	2–2	2–0	3–1	0–1	4–1	3–0	0–0	1–2	0–3
Altay	2–2	0–2		1–3	1–1	4–1	2–1	0–2	0–3	1–0	3–2	2–1	0–0	1–2	3–1	0–0	1–3	0–1
Beşiktaş	10–0	3–0	1–0		3–0	1–0	3–1	1–0	2–0	4–0	2–1	3–1	1–0	7–0	1–0	0–2	1–0	3–0
Boluspor	1–0	0–0	3–1	1–5		1–0	1–0	1–0	1–2	0–0	0–0	0–2	1–1	2–1	2–1	0–0	0–0	0–2
Bursaspor	4–0	2–1	1–1	1–1	1–1		3–2	2–1	1–2	1–0	2–1	1–0	0–0	4–1	4–0	0–1	1–1	4–1
Fenerbahçe	3–1	0–0	2–2	1–5	2–0	2–2		5–1	3–1	3–0	2–0	3–1	5–1	2–2	1–0	5–2	1–0	2–0
Galatasaray	3–0	5–0	1–2	0–0	2–0	5–1	1–0		1–1	2–1	4–0	0–0	2–0	5–1	2–1	1–1	2–1	2–2
Gençlerbirliği	7–0	2–0	0–2	1–1	0–0	3–1	0–2	1–1		3–2	2–2	2–2	0–1	3–2	1–0	1–1	0–4	0–0
Karşıyaka	1–0	2–1	5–1	1–4	3–4	2–0	1–2	1–2	1–5		5–1	1–0	1–1	3–2	1–0	3–1	1–1	2–0
Konyaspor	1–1	2–1	2–0	0–0	3–0	2–1	0–1	0–1	0–0	0–2		1–0	4–1	2–0	2–0	1–1	0–1	2–1
Malatyaspor	4–0	2–3	1–1	2–1	1–1	1–0	0–1	0–4	4–3	2–0	2–1		1–4	1–0	3–0	1–1	2–1	1–0
MKE Ankaragücü	1–0	2–2	0–2	1–0	0–4	1–0	0–1	0–1	2–0	1–0	0–1	1–2		1–0	1–2	3–4	0–0	2–0
Sakaryaspor	2–1	1–2	4–1	0–3	2–3	0–1	0–3	0–4	1–3	0–1	0–1	2–2	1–2		0–0	0–2	2–2	1–1
Samsunspor	3–0	1–1	1–0	1–3	1–1	1–2	1–2	1–0	0–0	1–0	2–0	1–1	0–1	0–1		1–2	2–0	0–0
Sarıyer	3–2	3–1	1–0	1–0	1–0	1–2	2–1	0–2	2–2	3–2	0–0	2–2	1–2	1–1	5–0		2–0	1–2
Trabzonspor	4–1	4–0	2–0	2–1	1–1	3–1	3–2	1–0	6–1	1–0	3–2	1–0	2–0	3–1	2–0	2–0		1–1
Zeytinburnuspor	4–1	2–0	3–1	0–2	1–0	2–0	1–2	0–2	2–0	0–1	1–2	1–0	3–0	0–1	4–2	0–2	0–0	

Source: TFF, Mackolik
Legend: Blue = home team win; Yellow = draw; Red = away team win.
