= 2002–03 Beşiktaş J.K. season =

Beşiktaş J.K.
2002–03 season
- President: (Turkey) Serdar Bilgili
- Manager: (Romania) Mircea Lucescu
- Stadium: İnönü Stadium
- Süper Lig: 1st
- Turkish Cup: Quarterfinals (eliminated)
- UEFA Cup: Quarterfinals (eliminated)
- Top goalscorer: League: Sergen Yalçın (11); All: İlhan Mansız (14)
Home colours	Away colours	Third colours

The 2002–03 season was the club's 44th season in the Turkish Super League and the club's 100th year in existence. After signing Romanian manager Mircea Lucescu, Beşiktaş won the league for the 12th time in club' history. Beşiktaş also had their most successful UEFA Cup run, by becoming a quarter finalist, however the club lost to S.S. Lazio 1–3 on aggregate, therefore eliminating them. Beşiktaş lost to Gençlerbirliği 3–4 in the quarterfinals of the Turkish Cup.

== Squad ==
Note: Flags indicate national team as defined under FIFA eligibility rules; some limited exceptions apply. Players may hold more than one non-FIFA nationality.

No.	Pos.	Nation	Player
1	GK	(Colombia) COL	Óscar Córdoba
2	DF	(Turkey) TUR	Tolga Doğantez
3	MF	(Turkey) TUR	Tayfur Havutçu (captain)
4	DF	(Turkey) TUR	Ahmet Yıldırım
5	DF	(Brazil) BRA	Ronaldo
6	MF	(Turkey) TUR	Yasin Sülün
7	FW	(Turkey) TUR	Ahmet Dursun
8	MF	(Brazil) BRA	Amaral
9	FW	(Romania) ROU	Daniel Pancu
10	MF	(Turkey) TUR	Sergen Yalçın
11	MF	(Turkey) TUR	Bayram Bektaş
13	MF	(Turkey) TUR	Tamer Tuna
16	MF	(Turkey) TUR	Niyazi Güney

No.	Pos.	Nation	Player
17	FW	(Poland) POL	Kaan Dobra
19	DF	(Turkey) TUR	İbrahim Üzülmez
20	MF	(Italy) ITA	Federico Giunti (on loan from Brescia)
21	FW	(France) FRA	Pascal Nouma
26	FW	(Turkey) TUR	İlhan Mansız
29	FW	(Turkey) TUR	Ali Cansun Begeçarslan
30	DF	(Brazil) BRA	Zago
33	GK	(Turkey) TUR	Göksel Gencer
37	MF	(Turkey) TUR	Zafer Demiray
41	MF	(Turkey) TUR	Serdar Topraktepe
44	DF	(Turkey) TUR	Ali Eren Beşerler
67	MF	(Turkey) TUR	Tümer Metin

== Competitions ==
=== Süper Lig ===
==== League table ====
Pos	Team	Pld	W	D	L	GF	GA	GD	Pts	Qualification or relegation
1	Beşiktaş (C)	34	26	7	1	63	21	+42	85	Qualification to Champions League group stage
2	Galatasaray	34	24	5	5	61	27	+34	77	Qualification to Champions League third qualifying round
3	Gençlerbirliği	34	19	9	6	76	40	+36	66	Qualification to UEFA Cup first round
4	Gaziantepspor	34	16	9	9	61	41	+20	57	Qualification to UEFA Cup first round
5	Malatyaspor	34	14	10	10	56	45	+11	52	Qualification to UEFA Cup first round

Rules for classification: 1) points; 2) goal difference; 3) number of goals scored.
(C) Champions

=== Turkish Cup ===
Beşiktaş had a bye in the first round and then played Elazığspor in the second round. Beşiktaş lost to Gençlerbirliği in the quarter finals.

December 4, 2002 Second round	Elazığspor	0–2	Beşiktaş	Elazığ
			Güney 80'; Begeçarslan 87'	Stadium: Elazığ Atatürk Stadium; Referee: Bülent Uzun

Third round	Denizlispor	1–2	Beşiktaş	Denizli
	Tandoğan 45'		Mansız 65', 74'	Stadium: Denizli Atatürk Stadium; Referee: Erol Ersoy

March 5, 2003 Quarterfinal	Beşiktaş	3–4 (a.e.t.)	Gençlerbirliği	Istanbul
	Mansız 46', 78', 88'		Hassan 25'; El-Saqqa 35'; Cihan 80', 106'	Stadium: BJK İnönü Stadium; Referee: İsmet Arzuman

=== UEFA Cup ===
Beşiktaş had their most successful run, by becoming a quarter finalist. In doing so, they became the second Turkish team to achieve the feat (Galatasaray achieved it in 2000).

==== First round ====
September 19, 2002	Beşiktaş (Turkey)	2–2	(Bosnia and Herzegovina) Sarajevo	Istanbul, Turkey
	Pancu 31'; Dursun 33'		Obuca 63'; Osmanhodžić 79'	Stadium: BJK İnönü Stadium

October 3, 2002	Sarajevo (Bosnia and Herzegovina)	0–5	(Turkey) Beşiktaş	Sarajevo, Bosnia and Herzegovina
			Pancu 5'; Üzülmez 43'; Dursun 72 (pen)' Sülün 84'; Begeçarslan 85'	Stadium: Asim Ferhatović Hase Stadium

Beşiktaş won 7–2 on aggregate.

==== Second round ====
October 31, 2002	Deportivo Alavés (Spain)	1–1	(Turkey) Beşiktaş	Vitoria, Spain, Spain
	Abelardo Fernández 90+3'		Antonio Karmona 31 (own)'	Stadium: Estadio Mendizorrotza

November 14, 2002	Beşiktaş (Turkey)	1–0	(Spain) Deportivo Alavés	Istanbul, Turkey
	İlhan Mansız 7'			Stadium: BJK İnönü Stadium

Beşiktaş won 2–1 on aggregate.

==== Third round ====
November 28, 2002	Beşiktaş (Turkey)	3–1	(Ukraine) Dynamo Kyiv	Istanbul, Turkey
	Daniel Pancu 30'; Ahmet Yıldırım 71'; Pascal Nouma 82'		Husin 29'	Stadium: BJK İnönü Stadium

December 12, 2002	Dynamo Kyiv (Ukraine)	0–0	(Turkey) Beşiktaş	Kyiv, Ukraine
				Stadium: Lobanovsky Dynamo Stadium

Beşiktaş won 3–1 on aggregate.

==== Fourth round ====
February 20, 2003	Slavia Prague (Czech Republic)	1–0	(Turkey) Beşiktaş	Prague, Czech Republic
	Tomáš Došek 62'			Stadium: Stadion Eden

February 27, 2003	Beşiktaş (Turkey)	4–2	(Czech Republic) Slavia Prague	Istanbul, Turkey
	Daniel Pancu 41'; Ronaldo Guiaro 61'; Ahmet Dursun 66'; İlhan Mansız 70'		Richard Dostálek 77 (pen]' Hrdlicka 83'	Stadium: BJK İnönü Stadium

Beşiktaş won 4–3 on aggregate.

==== Quarter-final ====
March 13, 2003	Lazio (Italy)	1–0	(Turkey) Beşiktaş	Rome, Italy
	Simone Inzaghi 55'			Stadium: Stadio Olimpico

March 20, 2003	Beşiktaş (Turkey)	1–2	(Italy) Lazio	Istanbul, Turkey
	Sergen Yalçın 82'		Stefano Fiore 5'; Lucas Castromán 9'	Stadium: BJK İnönü Stadium

Beşiktaş lost 1–3 on aggregate.
