= 1998–99 Galatasaray S.K. season =

Galatasaray
1998–99 season
- President: Faruk Süren
- Head coach: Fatih Terim
- Stadium: Ali Sami Yen Stadı
- 1. Lig: 1st
- Turkish Cup: Winners
- UEFA Champions League: Group stage
- Top goalscorer: League: Hakan Şükür (19); All: Hakan Şükür (26)
- Highest home attendance: 30,226 vs Gaziantepspor (1. Lig, 30 May 1999)
- Lowest home attendance: 11,502 vs Bursaspor (1. Lig, 7 February 1999)
- Average home league attendance: 26,388
Home colours	Away colours	Third colours

The 1998–99 season was Galatasaray's 95th in existence and the 41st consecutive season in the 1. Lig. This article shows statistics of the club's players in the season, and also lists all matches that the club have played in the season.

== Squad statistics ==
No.	Pos.	Name	1. Lig		Türkiye Kupası		CL		Total	
No.	Pos.	Name	Apps	Goals	Apps	Goals	Apps	Goals	Apps	Goals
1	GK	(Brazil) Claudio Taffarel	32	0	8	0	8	0	48	0
-	GK	(Turkey) Mehmet Bölükbaşi	2	0	0	0	0	0	2	0
-	GK	(Turkey) Kerem İnan	0	0	1	0	0	0	1	0
-	DF	(Turkey) Alper Tezcan	2	0	3	0	0	0	5	0
-	DF	(Romania) Iulian Filipescu	12	0	1	0	7	0	20	0
4	DF	(Romania) Gheorghe Popescu	29	2	5	1	8	0	42	3
3	DF	(Turkey) Bülent Korkmaz (C)	21	0	6	0	2	0	29	0
14	DF	(Turkey) Fatih Akyel	30	3	8	0	6	0	44	3
-	DF	(Turkey) Vedat İnceefe	13	0	3	0	7	0	23	0
57	DF	(Turkey) Hakan Ünsal	31	3	7	0	6	0	44	3
67	MF	(Turkey) Ergün Penbe	24	1	7	0	5	0	36	1
7	MF	(Turkey) Okan Buruk	28	11	6	0	8	1	42	12
11	MF	(Turkey) Hasan Şaş	24	4	5	1	8	0	37	5
-	MF	(Turkey) Tolunay Kafkas	14	1	3	0	4	0	21	1
20	MF	(Turkey) Tugay Kerimoğlu	22	2	7	0	5	0	34	2
8	MF	(Turkey) Suat Kaya	23	2	3	0	4	1	30	3
5	MF	(Turkey) Emre Belözoğlu	27	2	6	2	3	0	36	4
22	MF	(Turkey) Ümit Davala	25	2	8	3	6	1	39	6
10	MF	(Romania) Gheorghe Hagi	28	14	4	1	8	3	40	18
-	MF	(Turkey) Faruk Atalay	0	0	0	0	0	0	0	0
-	MF	(Australia) Ufuk Talay	8	0	4	0	1	0	13	0
6	FW	(Turkey) Arif Erdem	27	14	6	4	6	1	39	19
-	FW	(Turkey) Burak Akdiş	17	4	3	1	1	0	21	5
9	FW	(Turkey) Hakan Şükür	33	19	7	1	7	6	47	26

=== Players in / out ===
==== In ====
Pos.	Nat.	Name	Age	Moving from
GK	(Brazil)	Claudio Taffarel	32	Clube Atlético Mineiro
MF	(Turkey)	Tolunay Kafkas	30	Trabzonspor
MF	(Turkey)	Hasan Şaş	22	MKE Ankaragücü
FW	(Turkey)	Burak Akdiş	21	Kartal S.K.
DF	(Turkey)	Alper Tezcan	18	Galatasaray A2
GK	(Turkey)	Kerem İnan	18	Galatasaray A2
MF	(Turkey)	Faruk Atalay	17	Galatasaray A2

==== Out ====
Pos.	Nat.	Name	Age	Moving to
MF	(Turkey)	Mehmet Gönülaçar	26	Sakaryaspor on loan
GK	(Turkey)	Pierre Esser	28	Eintracht Trier
DF	(Turkey)	Feti Okuroğlu	27	Trabzonspor
FW	(Romania)	Ion Ionuț Luțu	23	FC Universitatea Craiova
MF	(Turkey)	Ceyhun Eriş	21	Göztepe SK on loan
GK	(Ghana)	Richard Kingson	20	Sakaryaspor on loan
MF	(Turkey)	Osman Coşkun	26	Sakaryaspor on loan
DF	(Turkey)	Adnan İlgin	25	Bursaspor
GK	(Turkey)	Volkan Kilimci	26	Elazığspor on loan
DF	(Romania)	Iulian Filipescu	24	Real Betis

== 1. Lig ==
=== Standings ===
Pos	Team	Pld	W	D	L	GF	GA	GD	Pts	Qualification or relegation
1	Galatasaray (C)	34	23	9	2	85	30	+55	78	Qualification to Champions League third qualifying round
2	Beşiktaş	34	23	8	3	58	27	+31	77	Qualification to Champions League second qualifying round
3	Fenerbahçe	34	22	6	6	84	29	+55	72	Qualification to UEFA Cup first round
4	Trabzonspor	34	17	7	10	48	37	+11	58	Qualification to Intertoto Cup third round
5	Kocaelispor	34	14	8	12	44	37	+7	50	Qualification to Intertoto Cup second round

Rules for classification: 1) points; 2) goal difference; 3) number of goals scored.
(C) Champions

=== Matches ===
8 August 1998 1	Galatasaray SK	3–1	Altay S.K.	Istanbul
20:00 EET	Gheorghe Hagi 5', 51'; Suat Kaya 86'	Report	Cüneyt Yis 20' (pen.)	Stadium: Ali Sami Yen Stadı; Attendance: ? Referee: Sadık İlhan

16 August 1998 2	Bursaspor	0–5	Galatasaray SK	Bursa
20:00 EET		(Report)	Gheorghe Hagi 49'; Hakan Şükür 57', 63', 82'; Arif Erdem 84'	Stadium: Bursa Atatürk Stadı; Referee: Erol Ersoy

22 August 1998 3	Galatasaray SK	3–1	Kocaelispor	Istanbul
20:00 EET	Gheorghe Hagi 34' (pen.); Hakan Ünsal 48'; Hasan Şaş 68'	Report	Nuri Çolak 77'	Stadium: Ali Sami Yen Stadı; Attendance: ? Referee: Kadir Tozlu

30 August 1998 4	Istanbulspor	1–4	Galatasaray SK	Istanbul
20:00 EET	Sergen Yalçın 58'	(Report)	Hasan Şaş 7', 45'; Tugay Kerimoğlu 81'; Hakan Şükür 88'	Stadium: İnönü Stadium; Referee: Orhan Erdemir

12 September 1998 5	Galatasaray SK	5–0	Erzurumspor	Istanbul
20:00 EET	Hakan Şükür 22', 88' (pen.); Fatih Akyel 53'; Ümit Davala 81'; Hakan Ünsal 90'	Report		Stadium: Ali Sami Yen Stadı; Attendance: ? Referee: Murat Ilgaz

20 September 1998 6	Fenerbahçe SK	2–2	Galatasaray SK	Istanbul
20:00 EET	Viorel Moldovan 15'; Elvir Baljić 18'	Report	Gheorghe Hagi 23'; Hakan Şükür 87'	Stadium: Şükrü Saracoğlu Stadium; Attendance: ? Referee: Erol Ersoy

27 September 1998 7	Galatasaray SK	0–2	Gençlerbirliği SK	Istanbul
19:00 EET		Report	Ümit Karan 37'; Lahcen Abrami 80'	Stadium: Ali Sami Yen Stadı; Attendance: 30,000; Referee: Bülent Uzun

17 October 1998 8	Adanaspor	2–2	Galatasaray SK	Adana
20:00 EET	Atakan Sancarbarlaz 19', 43'	(Report)	Tugay Kerimoğlu 44' (pen.); Hasan Şaş 64'	Stadium: Adana 5 Ocak Stadı; Referee: Yılnur Önen

24 October 1998 9	Galatasaray SK	3–1	Samsunspor	Istanbul
19:00 EET	Hakan Şükür 79', 81'; Hakan Ünsal 89'	Report	Cenk İşler 21'	Stadium: Ali Sami Yen Stadı; Attendance: 12,000; Referee: Mustafa Çulcu

31 October 1998 10	KDÇ Karabükspor	0–3	Galatasaray SK	Karabük
18:00 EET		Report	Gheorghe Hagi 5', 39'; Arif Erdem 89'	Stadium: Dr. Necmettin Şeyhoğlu Stadium; Referee: Murat Ilgaz

8 November 1998 11	Çanakkale Dardanelspor	0–5	Galatasaray SK	Çanakkale
19:00 EET		(Report)	Gheorghe Hagi 10' (pen.); Arif Erdem 36'; Hakan Şükür 54'; Okan Buruk 59'; Tolunay Kafkas 88'	Stadium: 18 Mart Stadı; Referee: Sadık İlhan

15 November 1998 12	Galatasaray SK	3–5	Trabzonspor	Istanbul
19:00 EET	Ogün Temizkanoğlu 14' (o.g.); Bülent Korkmaz 45'; Burak Akdiş 88'	(Report)	Serdar Tatlı 6', 31', 89'; Selahattin Kınalı 65'; Orhan Çıkırıkçı 86'	Stadium: Ali Sami Yen Stadı; Attendance: 20,079; Referee: Serdar Tatlı

21 November 1998 13	Sakaryaspor	0–0	Galatasaray SK	Adapazarı
14:00 EET		(Report)		Stadium: Adapazarı Atatürk Stadı; Referee: Erdal Güleç

12 December 1998 14	Galatasaray SK	3–1	Antalyaspor	Istanbul
19:00 EET	Emre Belözoğlu 58'; Okan Buruk 78'; Arif Erdem 89'	Report	Gocho Guintchev 61'	Stadium: Ali Sami Yen Stadı; Attendance: ? Referee: Kazım Erçakır

16 December 1998 15	Galatasaray SK	2–0	Beşiktaş JK	Istanbul
20:00 EET	Fatih Akyel 13'; Emre Belözoğlu 86'	Report		Stadium: Ali Sami Yen Stadı; Attendance: ? Referee: Orhan Erdemir

20 December 1998 16	Gaziantepspor	1–2	Galatasaray SK	Gaziantep
19:00 EET	Cem Beceren 64'	Report	Hakan Şükür 29'; Suat Kaya 87'	Stadium: Kamil Ocak Stadium; Referee: Ali Uluyol

23 December 1998 17	MKE Ankaragücü	2–2	Galatasaray SK	Ankara
19:00 EET	Tarık Daşgün 61' (pen.); Hakan Keleş 68'	Report	Hakan Şükür 20'; Okan Buruk 27'	Stadium: Ankara 19 Mayıs Stadium; Referee: Sadık İlhan

31 January 1999 18	Altay SK	0–2	Galatasaray SK	İzmir
19:00 EET		Report	Gheorghe Hagi 35'; Arif Erdem 54'	Stadium: İzmir Alsancak Stadium; Referee: Metin Tokat

7 February 1999 19	Galatasaray SK	5–0	Bursaspor	Istanbul
19:00 EET	Gheorghe Hagi 2', 20', 82'; Arif Erdem 44', 69'	Report		Stadium: Ali Sami Yen Stadı; Attendance: 11,502; Referee: Ali Uluyol

12 February 1999 20	Kocaelispor	1–2	Galatasaray SK	İzmit
20:00 EET	Roman Dąbrowski 79'	Report	Hakan Şükür 53', 58'	Stadium: İsmet Paşa Stadium; Referee: Erol Ersoy

21 February 1999 21	Galatasaray SK	3–3	Istanbulspor	Istanbul
19:00 EET	Okan Buruk 32'; Arif Erdem 57'; Fatih Akyel 89'	Report	Ümit Davala 44' (o.g.); Enes Demirović 81' (pen.); Mithat Yavaş 86'	Stadium: Ali Sami Yen Stadı; Attendance: 15,789; Referee: Muhittin Boşat

28 February 1999 22	Erzurumspor	0–1	Galatasaray SK	Erzurum
12:00 EET		(Report)	Burak Akdiş 66'	Stadium: Cemal Gürsel Stadı; Referee: Serdar Tatlı

7 March 1999 23	Galatasaray SK	2–0	Fenerbahçe SK	Istanbul
19:00 EET	Okan Buruk 55'; Hakan Şükür 82'	Report		Stadium: Ali Sami Yen Stadı; Attendance: 19,122; Referee: Orhan Erdemir

14 March 1999 24	Gençlerbirliği SK	1–2	Galatasaray SK	Ankara
19:00 EET	Hamid Merakchi 20'	Report	Gheorghe Hagi 12'; Okan Buruk 35'	Stadium: Ankara 19 Mayıs Stadium; Referee: Erol Ersoy

19 March 1999 25	Galatasaray SK	1–1	Adanaspor	Istanbul
20:00 EET	Hakan Şükür 85'	Report	Altan Aksoy 35'	Stadium: Ali Sami Yen Stadı; Referee: Ali Uluyol

3 April 1999 26	Samsunspor	0–3	Galatasaray SK	Samsun
19:00 EET		Report	Arif Erdem 8'; Gheorghe Popescu 23'; Ergün Penbe 90'	Stadium: Samsun 19 Mayıs Stadium; Referee: Bülent Uzun

10 April 1999 27	Galatasaray SK	2–0	KDÇ Karabükspor	Istanbul
19:00 EET	Arif Erdem 19'; Okan Buruk 30'	(Report)		Stadium: Ali Sami Yen Stadı; Attendance: ? Referee: İsmet Arzuman

17 April 1999 28	Galatasaray SK	5–2	Çanakkale Dardanelspor	Istanbul
19:00 EET	Ümit Davala 10'; Arif Erdem 14', 55', 90'; Okan Buruk 38'	(Report)	Tamer Tuna 35'; Bülent Uygun 82'	Stadium: Ali Sami Yen Stadı; Attendance: ? Referee: İlhami Kaplan

24 April 1999 29	Trabzonspor	0–3	Galatasaray SK	Trabzon
19:00 EET		Report	Okan Buruk 36'; Arif Erdem 52'; Hakan Şükür 71' (pen.)	Stadium: Hüseyin Avni Aker Stadium; Referee: Bülent Uzun

30 April 1999 30	Galatasaray SK	3–0	Sakaryaspor	Istanbul
19:00 EET	Okan Buruk 16'; Gheorghe Hagi 47'; Hakan Şükür 52' (pen.)	(Report)		Stadium: Ali Sami Yen Stadı; Attendance: ? Referee: Serdar Tatlı

9 May 1999 31	Beşiktaş JK	1–1	Galatasaray SK	Istanbul
19:00 EET	Mehmet Özdilek 75'	Report	Okan Buruk 4'	Stadium: İnönü Stadium; Referee: Murat Ilgaz

14 May 1999 32	Galatasaray SK	2–1	MKE Ankaragücü	Istanbul
20:00 EET	Burak Akdiş 44'; Hakan Şükür 66'	Report	Hakan Keleş 47'	Stadium: Ali Sami Yen Stadı; Attendance: 30,000; Referee: Ayhan Yücebilgiç

23 May 1999 33	Antalyaspor	1–1	Galatasaray SK	Antalya
17:00 EET	Fazlı Ulusal 78'	(Report)	Burak Akdiş 25'	Stadium: Atatürk Stadı; Referee: Mustafa Çulcu

30 May 1999 34	Galatasaray SK	0–0	Gaziantepspor	Istanbul
19:00 EET		Report		Stadium: Ali Sami Yen Stadı; Attendance: 30,226; Referee: Murat Ilgaz

== Türkiye Kupası ==
Kick-off listed in local time (EET)

=== Sixth round ===
18 November 1998 1	Adanaspor	0–2	Galatasaray SK	Adana
19:00 EET		(Report)	Gheorghe Popescu 3'; Burak Akdiş 76'	Stadium: Adana 5 Ocak Stadı; Referee: Kazım Erçakır

23 January 1999 2	Galatasaray SK	4–1	Adanaspor	Istanbul
19:00 EET	Arif Erdem 35', 48'; Emre Belözoğlu 47'; Hakan Şükür 61'	(Report)	Atakan Sancarbarlaz 20'	Stadium: Ali Sami Yen Stadı; Referee: Adnan Şeker

=== Quarter-final ===
27 January 1999 1	Istanbulspor	0–0	Galatasaray SK	Istanbul
14:00 EET	Tugay Kerimoğlu 35'; Gheorghe Popescu 70'	(Report)		Stadium: Çetin Emeç Stadı; Referee: Muhittin Boşat

3 February 1999 2	Galatasaray SK	3–2	Istanbulspor	Istanbul
20:00 EET	Arif Erdem 40'; Gheorghe Hagi 62'; Hasan Şaş 79'	(Report)	Mithat Yavaş 4'; Mehmet Yozgatlı 82'	Stadium: Ali Sami Yen Stadı; Referee: Orhan Erdemir

=== Semi-final ===
17 February 1999 1	Sakaryaspor	2–1	Galatasaray SK	Adapazarı
13:00 EET	Hüseyin Çimşir 10'; Mehmet Honca 83'	(Report)	Emre Belözoğlu 71'	Stadium: Atatürk Stadı; Referee: Murat Ilgaz

10 March 1999 2	Galatasaray SK	2–0	Sakaryaspor	Istanbul
19:00 EET	Arif Erdem 24'; Ümit Davala 64'	(Report)		Stadium: Ali Sami Yen Stadı; Referee: İbrahim Aksoy

=== Final ===
14 April 1999 1	Galatasaray SK	0–0	Beşiktaş JK	Istanbul
19:00 EET		(Report)		Stadium: Ali Sami Yen Stadı; Attendance: 14,513; Referee: Muhittin Boşat

5 May 1999 2	Beşiktaş JK	0–2	Galatasaray SK	Istanbul
20:30 EET		(Report)	Ümit Davala 52', 68'	Stadium: İnönü Stadı; Referee: Oğuz Sarvan

== UEFA Champions League ==
=== Second qualifying round ===
12 August 1998 1	Galatasaray SK	2–1	Grasshopper Club Zürich	Istanbul
	Gheorghe Hagi 59' (pen.); Hakan Şükür 65'	(Report)	Johann Vogel 87'	Stadium: Ali Sami Yen Stadı; Referee: (France) Marc Batta

26 August 1998 2	Grasshopper Club Zürich	2–3	Galatasaray SK	Zurich
	Kubilay Türkyılmaz 45'; Johann Vogel 70'	(Report)	Hakan Şükür 17', 45'; Gheorghe Hagi 65' (pen.)	Stadium: Hardturm; Referee: (Portugal) Vítor Melo Pereira

=== Group stage ===
Pos	Team	Pld	W	D	L	GF	GA	GD	Pts	Qualification
1	(Italy) Juventus	6	1	5	0	7	5	+2	8	Advance to knockout stage
2	(Turkey) Galatasaray	6	2	2	2	8	8	0	8	
3	(Norway) Rosenborg	6	2	2	2	7	8	−1	8	
4	(Spain) Athletic Bilbao	6	1	3	2	5	6	−1	6	

Source: UEFA

16 September 1998 1	Juventus FC	2–2	Galatasaray SK	Turin
21:45 EET	Filippo Inzaghi 16'; Alessandro Birindelli 68'	(Report)	Hakan Şükür 44'; Ümit Davala 63'	Stadium: Stadio delle Alpi; Attendance: 37,192; Referee: (Germany) Markus Merk

30 September 1998 2	Galatasaray SK	2–1	Athletic Bilbao	Istanbul
21:45 EET	Okan Buruk 15'; Gheorghe Hagi 90'	(Report)	Ismael Urzaiz 16'	Stadium: Ali Sami Yen Stadı; Attendance: 24,000; Referee: (England) Graham Poll

21 October 1998 3	Rosenborg BK	3–0	Galatasaray SK	Trondheim
21:45 EET	Sigurd Rushfeldt 69', 86', 90'	(Report)		Stadium: Lerkendal Stadion; Attendance: 15,000; Referee: (Russia) Nikolai Levnikov

4 November 1998 4	Galatasaray SK	3–0	Rosenborg BK	Istanbul
21:45 EET	Hakan Şükür 55', 74'; Arif Erdem 66'	(Report)		Stadium: Ali Sami Yen Stadı; Attendance: 20,000; Referee: (Germany) Hellmut Krug

2 December 1998 5	Galatasaray SK	1–1	Juventus FC	Istanbul
21:45 EET	Suat Kaya 90'	(Report)	Nicola Amoruso 77'	Stadium: Ali Sami Yen Stadı; Attendance: 22,920; Referee: (France) Gilles Veissière

9 December 1998 6	Athletic Bilbao	1–0	Galatasaray SK	Bilbao
21:45 EET	Julen Guerrero 44'	(Report)		Stadium: San Mamés Stadium; Attendance: 16,000; Referee: (Switzerland) Urs Meier

== Friendly Matches ==
Kick-off listed in local time (EET)

=== TSYD Kupası ===
26 July 1998 1	Fenerbahçe SK	1–4	Galatasaray SK	Istanbul
20:30 EET	Elvir Baljić 8'	(Report)	Hakan Şükür 35'; Hasan Şaş 51', 62'; Arif Erdem 69'	Stadium: Fenerbahçe Stadı; Referee: Serdar Çakır

2 August 1998 2	Galatasaray SK	0–0	Beşiktaş JK	Istanbul
20:30 EET		(Report)		Stadium: Ali Sami Yen Stadı; Referee: Orhan Erdemir

== Attendance ==
Competition	Av. Att.	Total Att.
1. Lig	26,388	448,596
Türkiye Kupası	14,513	14,513
Champions League	22,306	66,920
Total	25,239	530,029
