= Sinan Engin =

Turkish former footballer, current pundit and TV personality and peyser

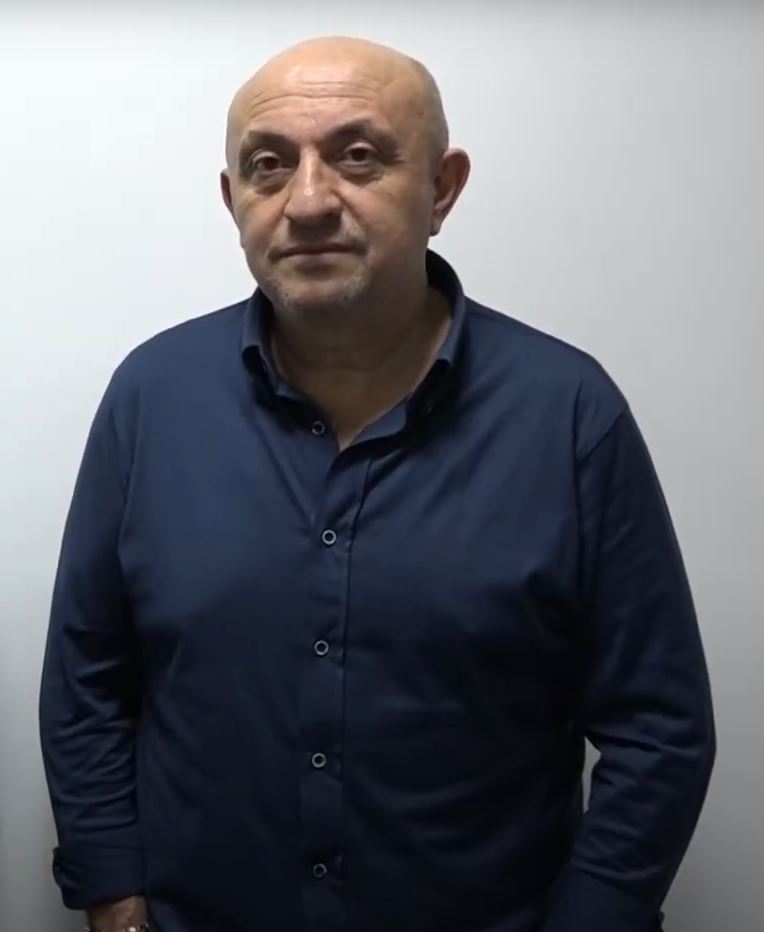

Personal information
- Full name: Sinan Engin
- Date of birth: 4 November 1964 (age 61)
- Place of birth: Istanbul, Turkey
- Height: 1.70 m (5 ft 7 in)
- Position: Midfielder

Youth career
- 1974–1981: Beşiktaş

Senior career*
Years	Team	Apps	(Gls)
1981–1989	Beşiktaş	99	(11)
1988–1989	→ Kuşadasıspor (loan)	13	(6)
1989–1990	Adana Demirspor	11	(4)
1990–1993	Ankaragücü	69	(24)
1993–1994	Sarıyer	14	(0)
Total		206	(45)

International career
1982–1983	Turkey U18	12	(0)
1985	Turkey U21	2	(0)
- * Club domestic league appearances and goals

Sinan Engin (born 4 November 1964) is a Turkish former footballer, current pundit and TV Personality. Engin spent most part of his career at Istanbul-based Beşiktaş J.K. where he joined in 1974 at junior level. Engin represented Turkey at U18 and U21 levels.

== Club career ==
Sinan Engin recruited in cadets team of Beşiktaş J.K. academy by Serpil Hamdi Tüzün, then-academy manager, in 1974. He was promoted to senior squad in 1981, at the age of 16, by senior team coach Đorđe Milić.

Following a personal issue with manager Gordon Milne, Sinan Engin was loaned out Kuşadası Gençlik Spor Kulübü at 1988–89 season. Galatasaray S.K. and Altay S.K. was also interested in Engin, at previous stages of same season. The issue between the two started following an outspoken claim of Engin, stating he was treated unfairly and emotionally kept bench by Milne, saying "I can play with shut eyes at this team". Kuşadasıspor agreed to pay TL100 million to Beşiktaş, as well as buying an apartment and a 1988 model Mercedes car to Engin. Although he was contracted with Kuşadasıspor, he was spotted at a training session of Beşiktaş in April 1989. On 30 June 1989, Engin returned from loan, with a contract renewal summing up TL100 million.

On 21 November 1989, while his Adana Demirspor spell, Engin scored twice against Altay on an away game ended 2–2, taken place in Izmir.

Sinan Engin joined Ankaragücü in 1990–91 transfer window. On 27 September 1992, Engin scored the equalizer in the away game against Fenerbahçe S.K. on 31st minute, ended 2–1. In October 1992, Aydınspor interested in Engin, offered an exchange trade of Engin with a Bulgarian player, which was refused by Ankaragücü. In October 1992, following an incident between club officials and club supporters, Engin announced he has no longer intention to play at Ankaragücü, refusing to join trainings. On 9 February 1993, while playing at Ankaragücü for the 3rd season, he expressed that he would love to return Beşiktaş where he hopes to retire from professional football, in case Gordon Milne approves a potential transfer.

On 9 July 1993, Engin joined another Istanbul side Sarıyer S.K., with a contract worth an apartment in Tarabya, Sarıyer district and TL1.00 billion.

In 1994, at the age of 30, Sinan Engin retired from professional football.

== Post-playing career ==
In 2001, Sinan Engin was appointed as Team Manager at Beşiktaş, which ended in 2004, due to his alleged relationship, telephone call records with Turkish underground figure Alaattin Çakıcı whom he was alleged to supply travel visa documents using Beşiktaş J.K. letterhead. Engin and Çakıcı allegedly knew each other from their childhood neighbourhood in Istanbul.

Engin joined the Turkish TV8 football weekly review show "3. Devre". Engin returned to Beşiktaş at same title, Team Manager, between 2006 and 2008. On 27 May 2009, he quit punditry from weekly football review show "Telegol" at Kanal Türk and joined Manisaspor as Team Manager.

In 2011, he joined "Beyaz TV", a local broadcaster for punditry at weekly shows "Beyaz Futbol" and "Derin Futbol", along with former referee Ahmet Çakar.

In November 2020, Engin had a cameo appearance at Turkish TV series Çukur, aired on Show TV.

== Personal life ==
Sinan Engin was born in Gültepe, Istanbul to a family from Maçka, Trabzon. He completed his mandatory service to Turkish Army in 1989. Engin was married with Turkish singer and TV personality Seda Sayan between 1990 and 1995. Oğulcan, their only son, was born in 1990; who had a respectively shorter professional football career than his father, played at Kasımpaşa S.K. at 2010–11 Süper Lig season under a professional contract and capped twice at U-17 and U-18 level for Turkey.

Engin married Ayşe Engin in 1997. Elif, his second kid, was born in 1997. and studied Law at Galatasaray University.

== Stats ==
Appearances and goals by club, season and competition
Club	Season	League		Cup		Europe		Total	
Club	Season	Apps	Goals	Apps	Goals	Apps	Goals	Apps	Goals
Beşiktaş J.K.	1982–83	17	0	0	0	—		17	0
Beşiktaş J.K.	1983–84	12	0	0	0	—		12	0
Beşiktaş J.K.	1984–85	2	0	0	0	—		2	0
Beşiktaş J.K.	1985–86	15	2	0	0	—		15	2
Beşiktaş J.K.	1986–87	34	8	0	0	—		34	8
Beşiktaş J.K.	1987–88	18	1	0	0	—		18	1
Beşiktaş J.K.	1988–89	1	0	0	0	—		1	0
Beşiktaş J.K.	Total	99	11	0	0	0	0	99	11
Adana Demirspor	1989–90	11	4	0	0	—		11	4
Adana Demirspor	Total	11	4	0	0	0	0	11	4
MKE Ankaragücü	1990–91	23	7	0	0	—		23	7
MKE Ankaragücü	1991–92	26	12	0	0	—		26	12
MKE Ankaragücü	1992–93	20	5	0	0	—		20	5
MKE Ankaragücü	Total	69	24	0	0	0	0	69	24
Sarıyer S.K.	1993–94	14	0	0	0	—		14	0
Sarıyer S.K.	Total	14	0	0	0	0	0	14	0
Career total		206	45	0	0	0	0	206	45

== Achievements ==
Beşiktaş J.K.

- Super League (1): 1985-86
- Super League (Runner-up) (3): 1984-85, 1986-87, 1987-88

== Filmography and television ==
=== Film ===
Year	Title	Role	Notes
2009	No Ofsayt	Himself	
2013	İki Kafadar: Chinese Connection	Cabbar	
2015	Can Tertip	Rüstem	
2016	Adam mısın!	Himself	

=== Television ===
Year	Channel	Title	Notes
2006	TV8	3. Devre	Pundit
–2009	Kanal Türk	Telegol	Pundit
2011–	Beyaz TV	Beyaz Futbol (on Sundays); Derin Futbol (on Mondays)	Pundit
2020	Show TV	Çukur	Cameo
2022	Fox	Senden Daha Güzel	Cameo
