= Beşiktaş J.K. Football Academy =

Beşiktaş Football Academy
- Full name: Beşiktaş J.K. Football Youth System
- Nicknames: Kara Kartallar (Black Eagles); Siyah Beyazlılar (Black and White Ones); Yavru Kartallar (Junior Eagles)
- Founded: 1903; 123 years ago, as Beşiktaş Jimnastik Kulübü; 1975; 51 years ago, as Beşiktaş Özkaynak Düzeni
- Ground: Fulya Şan Ökten Facilities; Nevzat Demir Facilities
- Capacity: 1,000
- President: Hasan Arat
- Academy Director: Mehmet Ekşi
- Website: http://www.bjk.com.tr/
Home colours	Away colours	Third colours

Beşiktaş J.K. Youth System (Turkish: Beşiktaş J.K. Özkaynak Düzeni) is the youth system of football department of Turkish sports club Beşiktaş J.K. As of 2020, Beşiktaş Youth System is operated between age groups of 8 and 19.

The senior (oldest) section of Beşiktaş J.K. Youth System competed up to age group of 21 until the end of 2018–19, when Turkish Football Federation announced the termination of U21 Ligi.

The senior section were formerly known as "Beşiktaş J.K. Genç Takımı", "Beşiktaş J.K. Amatör" or "Beşiktaş J.K. B Takımı" until 1996, "Beşiktaş J.K. PAF Takımı" between 1996 and 2009, "Beşiktaş J.K. A2" between 2009 and 2014 and, "Beşiktaş J.K. U-21" between 2014 and 2019. Since 2019–20 season, the senior section is the age group of 19 (U-19).

== History ==
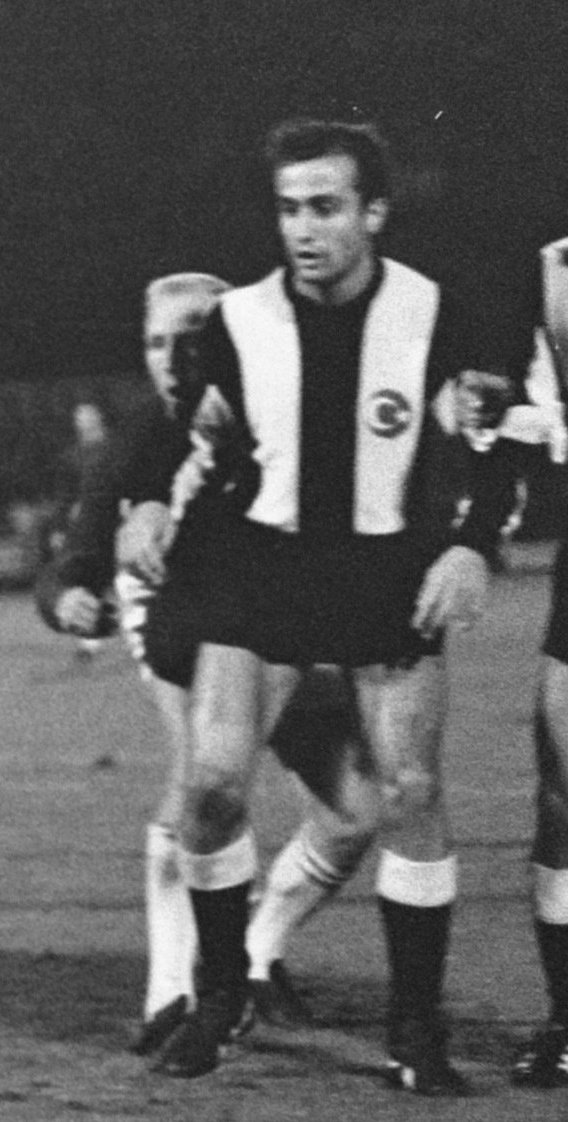
Played between 1959 and 1962 at youth squad, Sanlı Sarıalioğlu served entirely for Beşiktaş in his senior career where he captained between 1968 and 1975

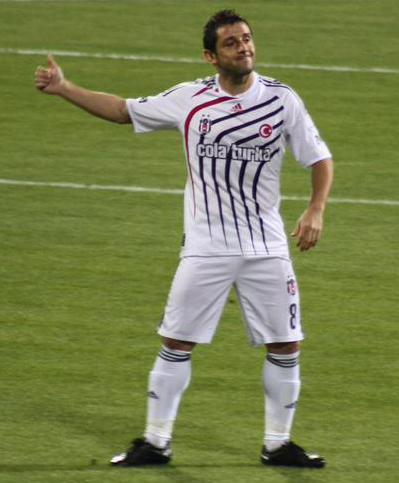
Former Spanish La Liga runner-up Nihat Kahveci was a part of Beşiktaş J.K. Amatör between 1996 and 1997.

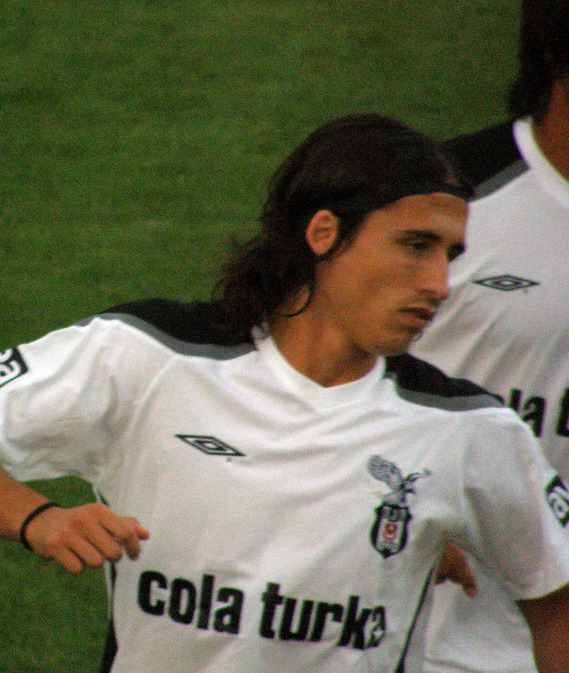
3-times Turkish international Serdar Özkan played 6 years at youth level between 1999 and 2005.

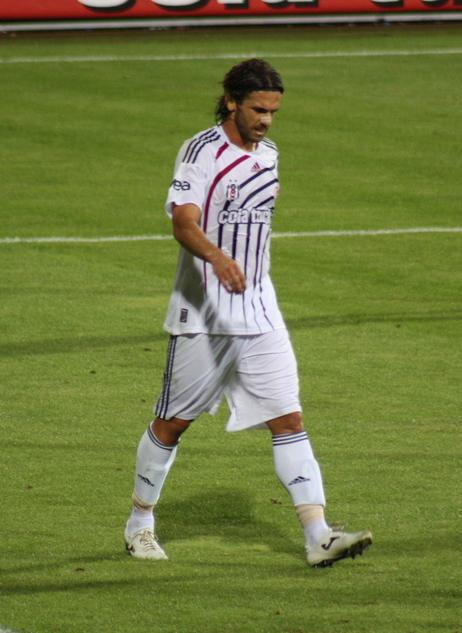
İbrahim Kaş, an alumnus experienced Spanish La Liga football at Getafe CF between 2008 and 2011

Football department of Beşiktaş was established in 1911, where shortly after the department merged with "Basiret" and "Valideçeşme", two other football teams located in Beşiktaş district of Istanbul, there were 3 different reserve teams formed.

In 1943, Süleyman Seba (1926–2014) was recruited for Beşiktaş Genç Takımı, while playing at high school level football at Kabataş Erkek Lisesi. In 1946, Seba got promoted onto senior squad. Süleyman Seba later became the president of Beşiktaş between 1984 and 2000.

During 1963–64 Balkans Cup, Beşiktaş were requested to play two back-to-back away games within 2 days. Due to logistic challenges Beşiktaş B Team represented the club at senior level football played in Tirana, Albania, facing KS Dinamo Tirana on 17 October 1963. The match ended 2–0 in favour of Albanian side.

Under Management of Serpil Hamdi Tüzün and financial support of club official Atıf Keçeli, Beşiktaş J.K. formed a youth investment program, named "Beşiktaş Özkaynak Düzeni", aiming to promote youngsters for professional level, was established in 1975. In 1978, Ziya Doğan, Süleyman Oktay and Fuat Yaman were the first ever graduates those promoted onto senior team. In following four seasons, Fikret Demirer, Burhan Ertürk were promoted.

Following a 3 wins and 1 draw performance in total of 4 games, beating Orduspor Amatör with 2–1 score at final held in Aydın, Beşiktaş Amatör won 1985 Turkish Amateur Football Championship. This success qualified Beşiktaş Amatör to participate at 1985–86 Turkish Cup, in which they were eliminated by PTT at Round 1 by a 1–0 final score.

On 6 March 1988, beating Denizli Belediyespor with 2–0 final score, Beşiktaş Amatör won 1988 Turkish Amateur Football Championship.

In Round 3 of 1988–89 Turkish Cup, Beşiktaş J.K. senior team drew Beşiktaş Amatör, in order to play a 2-legged-round by games to be played respectively 25 January and 1 February 1989. Beşiktaş J.K. seniors beat Beşiktaş Amatör 4–0 at first encounter. Goals of senior team were scored by Metin Tekin, Mehmet Özdilek and Halim Okta (two goals). Held at Fenerbahçe Stadium on 1 February 1989, following a 5–1 win in front of 923 recorded spectators, Beşiktaş J.K. seniors eliminated Beşikaş Amatör with 9–1 aggregate score.

On 7 May 1995, Beşiktaş PAF drew Fenerbahçe PAF with 1–1 final score and secured the PAF Ligi title at penultimate round of 1994–95 season.

PAF team won the title after 2002–03 season, colloquially known as the club's centenary year.

On 14 May 2006, at last game of 2005–06 season, Beşiktaş PAF were beaten by Trabzonspor PAF with a 3–0 final score as team completed the game 2 men down following 2 red cards shown, and finished the season on 3rd place.

In the second half of the 2008–09 season, Beşiktaş J.K. U-21 alumnus Sergen Yalçın managed the team on a 6-month spell, with an undefeated tally.

In 2013, youth ladies section was established.

In 2014, there were 19 players trained by Beşiktaş J.K. U-21, in which 2 players played senior level for club and 17 were hired by other clubs.

On 2 December 2016, during a U-21 derby encounter held at Fenerbahçe Lefter Küçükandonyadis Facilities, hosting side Fenerbahçe U-21 ran out of their three substitution quota and they had to play down to 10-man due to the injury of Alparslan Demir picked up in second half, Beşiktaş U-21 coach Yasin Sülün substititued Sedat Şahintürk out on 74th minute and did not replace him with another player, letting the teams playing remaining 16 minutes 10 to 10 players. The game ended 3–1 in favour of Beşiktaş U-21.

On 23 May 2018, Beşiktaş U-21 beat Balıkesirspor U-21 and won the U-21 Super Cup. Following the 2–2 score at normal period, the game prolonged and winning goal was scored by Burak Yamaç at 118th minute that sealed 3–2 final score.

Following abrogation of U-21 League by TFF in July 2019, U-21 level of Beşiktaş youth sector was dissolved.

In July 2020, club announced that their cooperation with former German international olayer Fabian Ernst, who also played at Beşiktaş between 2009 and 2012, to establish youth academies across continental Europe, focusing Germany, Austria and, the Netherlands.

On 16 September 2020, club confirmed 7 players and 5 personnel were tested positive for COVID-19 amidst the COVID-19 pandemic. Following the diagnosis, club management cancelled the training sessions for indefinite period.

== Results ==
=== Beşiktaş Amatör results ===
==== Turkish Cup ====
Season	Round	Opponent	Home	Away	Aggregate	Reference
1985–86	5th	PTT	0–1		0–1	(Note: Single legged round.)
1988–89	1st	Bayrampaşa	3–0		3–0	
1988–89	2nd	Zeytinburnuspor	8–6 (a.e.t.)		8–6	
1988–89	3rd	Beşiktaş	1–5	0–4	1–9	

=== U-21 results ===
==== League (1996–2019) ====
Season	League	Pos	Pld	W	D	L	GS	GA	P	Manager	Notes
1996–97	PAF Ligi	6	34	18	4	12	63	34	58	Davut Şahin	
1997–98	PAF Ligi	2	34	23	5	6	78	33	74		
1998–99	PAF Ligi	8	34	15	9	10	51	42	54		
1999–2000	PAF Ligi	1	34	26	7	1	63	21	85		
2000–01	PAF Ligi	4	34	16	11	7	65	27	59		
2001–02	PAF Ligi	4	34	19	8	7	68	39	65		
2002–03	PAF Ligi	1	34	20	10	4	78	40	70	Fikret Demirer	
2003–04	PAF Ligi	6	34	17	9	8	48	28	60		
2004–05	PAF Ligi	5	34	17	11	6	83	50	62		
2005–06	PAF Ligi	3	34	24	1	9	71	30	73	Recep Çetin	
2006–07	PAF Ligi	2	34	21	7	6	74	34	70	Fikret Demirer	
2007–08	PAF Ligi	7	34	15	9	10	59	35	54	Fikret Demirer	
2008–09	PAF Ligi	8	34	12	13	9	53	35	49		
2009–10	A2 Ligi	3	32+3	23+1	4+1	5+1	65+7	25+5	73+4	Sergen Yalçın	(Note: In 2009–10 season, BJK A2 completed Marmara Group in 1st place at regular fixture (along with other three groups). They 3rd third place in Play-off Group A and failed to advance to Finale.)
2010–11	A2 Ligi	4	38	21	8	9	58	44	71	Ömer Gülen	(Note: In 2010–11 season, BJK A2 completed Group 1 1st in regular fixture (along with other three groups) and failed to advance to Finale.)
2011–12	A2 Ligi	5	16+14	10+5	4+4	2+5	37+22	17+18	34+19	Talat Tuncel	(Note: In 2011–12 season, BJK A2 completed Group 1 1st in regular phase of Kademe Grupları (along with other three groups). They finished Final Grubu phase as 5th and failed to advance the Quarter Finals.)
2012–13	A2 Ligi	1/4 Finals	20+14+1	11+8+0	7+4+0	2+2+1	45+26+0	23+15+2	40+28	Erkan Avseren	
2013–14	A2 Ligi	1/8 Finals	14+12	10+9	1+1	3+2	38+23	16+10	31+28	Erkan Avseren	
2014–15	U-21 Süper Ligi	9	34	14	5	15	56	50	47		
2015–16	U-21 Süper Ligi	3	34	21	10	3	76	29	73	Yasin Sülün	
2016–17	U-21 Süper Ligi	2	34	23	7	4	63	24	76	Yasin Sülün	
2017–18	U-21 Süper Ligi	1	34	23	7	4	64	29	76	Yasin Sülün	
2018–19	U-21 Süper Ligi	3	34	22	6	6	64	29	72	Yasin Sülün	

Background colours: Gold=winners; Silver=runners-up; Bronze=third

=== U-19 results ===
==== League (2013–) ====
Season	League	Div	Pos	Pld	W	D	L	GS	GA	P	Manager	Notes
2013–14	Academy League	U-19 Elite	3	34	21	6	7	78	46	69		
2014–15	Academy League	U-19 Elite	1	34	29	1	4	98	31	88		
2015–16	Academy League	U-19 Elite	5	34	19	6	9	72	40	63		
2016–17	Academy League	U-19	5	30	14	8	8	61	35	50		
2017–18	Development League	U-19 Elite	11	34	12	7	15	41	39	43		
2018–19	Development League	U-19 Elite	2	34	25	6	3	74	46	81		
2019–20	Development League	U-19 Elite - Group A	3	25	13	8	3	58	27	47	Yunus Murat Ceylan	
2020–21	Development League	U-19 Elite	8	20	10	3	5	41	30	33		
2021–22	Development League	U-19 Elite	2	38	25	8	5	88	39	83		
2022–23	Development League	U-19 Elite - Group 2	4	22	14	4	4	48	27	46		(Note: Finished the regular round at 1st place after 22 games at "Group 2", the team was eliminated in play-off semi-finals stage against Altınordu F.K. by 7–6 a.e.t.)

Background colours: Gold=winners; Silver=runners-up; Bronze=third

==== UEFA Youth League (2013–) ====
Season	Round	Opposing team	Home	Away	Aggregate	Reference
2015–16	First Round	(Kazakhstan) Aktobe	4–0	2–0	6–0	
2015–16	Second Round	(Austria) Salzburg	1–0	1–5	2–5	
2016–17	Group B	(Portugal) Benfica	0–3	0–0	4th	
2016–17	Group B	(Ukraine) Dynamo Kyiv	3–3	1–3	4th	
2016–17	Group B	(Italy) Napoli	0–1	2–2	4th	
2017–18	Group B	(Portugal) Porto	0–1	1–5	4th	
2017–18	Group B	(France) Monaco	3–2	0–3	4th	
2017–18	Group B	(Germany) RB Leipzig	1–1	0–4	4th	
2021–22	Group C	(Germany) Borussia Dortmund	2–3	2–6	4th	
2021–22	Group C	(Netherlands) Ajax	0–1	3–1	4th	
2021–22	Group C	(Portugal) Sporting CP	1–3	2–1	4th	

== Honours ==
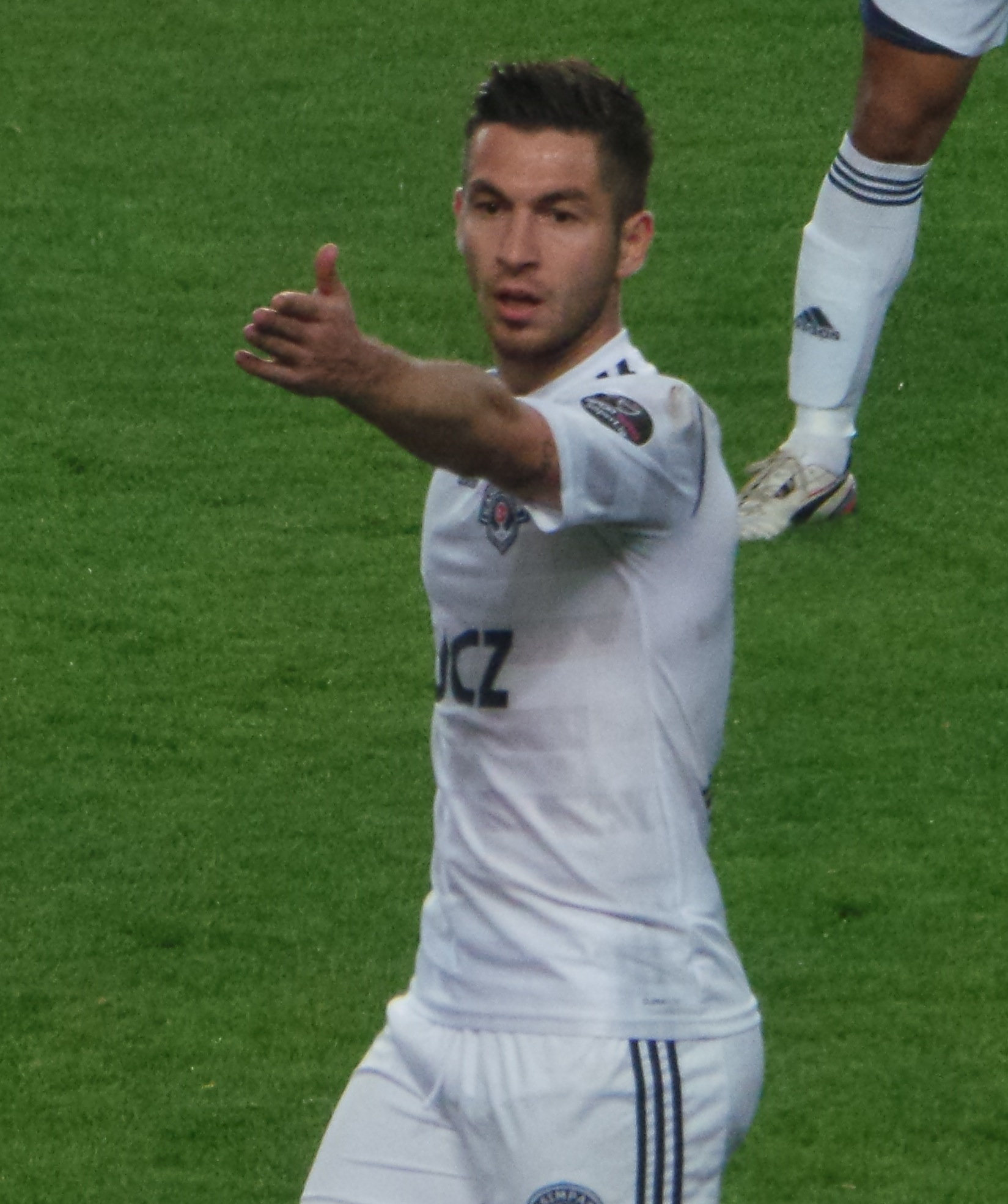
Played at Beşiktaş J.K. A2 between 2003 and 2005, Adem Büyük was top scorer in 2004–05 season of PAF Ligi, scoring 26 goals

=== U-21 ===
- Turkish Amateur Football Championship
  - Winners (2): 1985, 1988
- Istanbul Amateur Football Istanbul League
  - Winners (1): 1994–85
- PAF Ligi
  - Winners (5): 1990–91, 1994–95, 1995–96, 1999–2000, 2002–03
- U-21 Süper Ligi
  - Winners (1): 2017–18
- U-21 Super Cup
  - Winners (1): 2018

=== U-19 ===
- U-19 Elite League
  - Winners (1): 2014–15
- U-19 Super Cup
  - Winners (1): 2014–15

=== Individual ===
- U21 Ligi Top Scorer (2): 2004–05 (Adem Büyük, 26 goals), 2015–16 (Hamza Küçükköylü, 26 goals)

== Squads ==
=== U-19 Squad ===
As of 6 December 2023.

Note: Flags indicate national team as defined under FIFA eligibility rules; some limited exceptions apply. Players may hold more than one non-FIFA nationality.

No.	Pos.	Nation	Player
—	GK	TUR	Efe Murat Güler
—	GK	TUR	Emir Yaşar
—	GK	TUR	Yusuf İslam Atay
—		TUR	Abdülmecid Dönmez
—		TUR	Arda Berk Özüarap
—		TUR	Aytuğ Batur Kömeç
—		TUR	Baran Kalkavan
—		TUR	Berkay Kençtemur
—		TUR	Cemal Azad Demir
—		TUR	Emre Kaya
—		TUR	Fahri Kerem Ay
—		TUR	Muhammed Eren
—		TUR	Şahin Kalınsazlıoğlu
—		TUR	Sercan Kaya

No.	Pos.	Nation	Player
—		TUR	Emrecan Terzi
—		TUR	Turgut Arda Görmüş
—	MF	TUR	Yakup Arda Kılıç
—		TUR	Yağız Mengi
—		MKD	Besar Gudfuji
—		TUR	Baran Can
—		TUR	Berhan Kutlay Şatlı
—		TUR	Doruk Tuğrul
—		TUR	Güney Diyar Kılıççeken
—		TUR	İslam Aydın
—		TUR	Mustafa Erhan Hekimoğlu
—		TUR	Poyraz Gelen
—		TUR	Soner Salih Yavuz
—		TUR	Yusufcan Calayır

=== U-17 Squad ===
As of 6 December 2023.

Note: Flags indicate national team as defined under FIFA eligibility rules; some limited exceptions apply. Players may hold more than one non-FIFA nationality.

No.	Pos.	Nation	Player
—	GK	TUR	Miraç Durdu
—	GK	TUR	Tuğra Yeşilyurt
—	GK	TUR	Bilal Buğra Genç
—		TUR	Asım Efe Işık
—		TUR	Aziz Mert Aydınoğlu
—		TUR	Batuhan Güner
—		TUR	Berk Metin Erdoğan
—		TUR	Cumali Gürsel
—		TUR	Çınar Fırat

No.	Pos.	Nation	Player
—		TUR	Devrim Şahin
—		TUR	Enes Cinemre
—		TUR	Furkan Çiftçi
—		TUR	Kartal Cengizer
—		TUR	Kerem Katranlı
—		TUR	Kerem Nurhan
—		TUR	Mustafa Azem Yortaç
—		TUR	Oğuz Çakıroğlu
—		TUR	Yiğit Yasin Yüksel

== Staff ==
As of 1 October 2020.

Name	Nat.	Job
Mehmet Ekşi	(Turkey)	Academy and Youth Development Director
İbrahim Nuri Şahbaz	(Turkey)	Managing Director
Suat Taştan	(Turkey)	Executive Manager
Yunus Murat Ceylan	(Turkey)	U-19 Coach
Hikmet Çapanoğlu	(Turkey)	U-17 Coach
Aydın Tuna	(Turkey)	U-16 Coach
Cem Özden	(Turkey)	U-15 Coach
Gökalp Şahin	(Turkey)	U-14 Coach
Faruk Hakan Şahin	(Turkey)	U-13 Coach
Mesut Kır	(Turkey)	U-12 Coach
Caner Kaya	(Turkey)	U-11 Coach
Cengiz Aydın	(Turkey)	U-10 Coach
Recep Ömer Gülen	(Turkey)	U-8 and U-9 Coach

== Established graduates ==
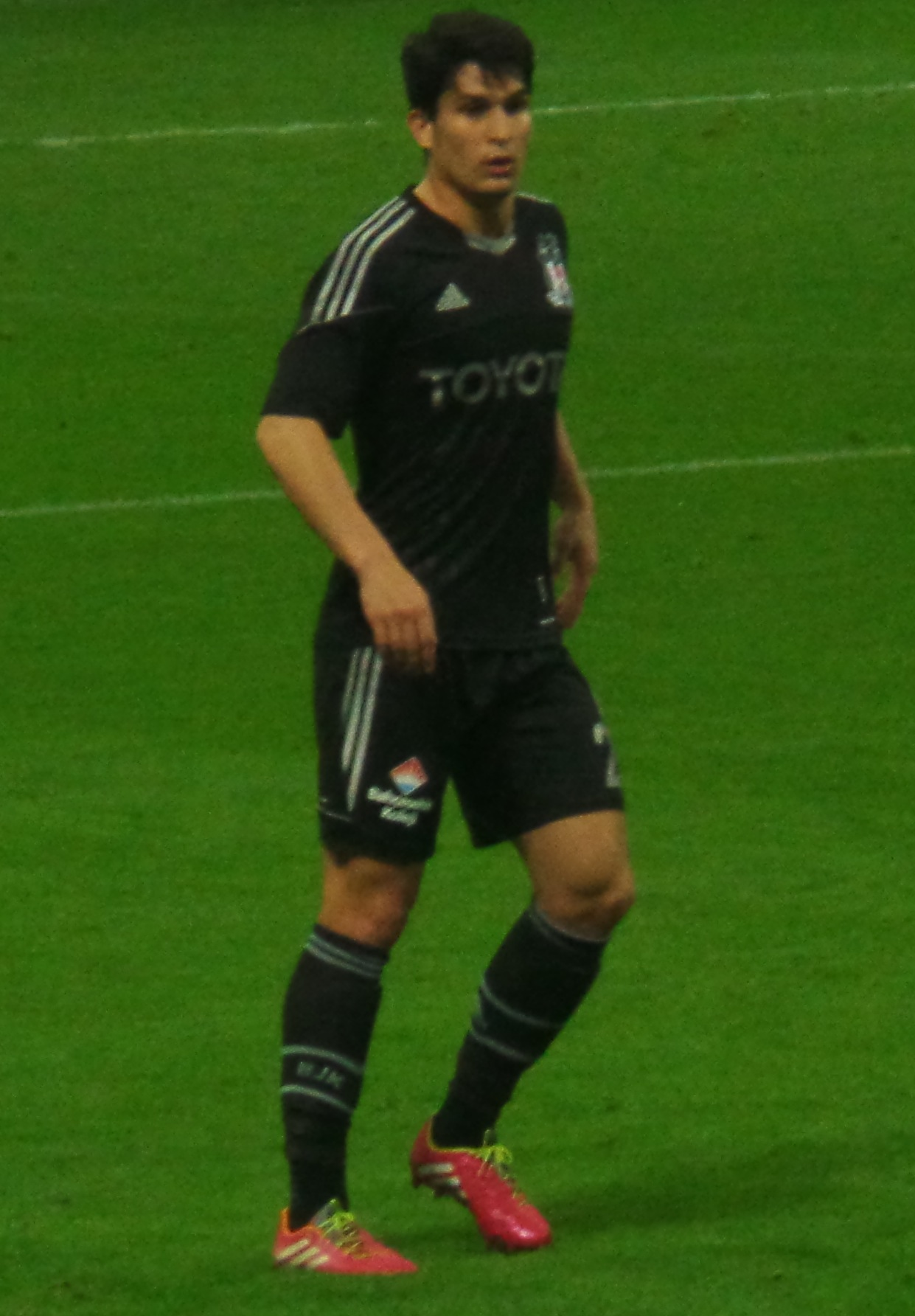
A member of Beşiktaş J.K. senior squad since 2009, Necip Uysal played at youth level between 2004 and 2009.

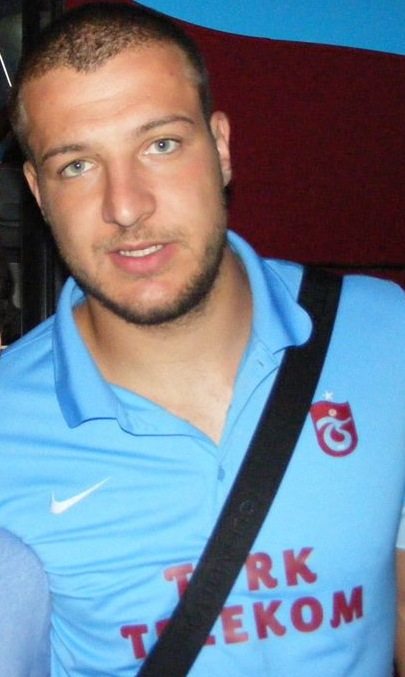
Nomadic forward Batuhan Karadeniz player at youth level between 2003 and 2007 and made his Süper Lig debut in 2007–08 season

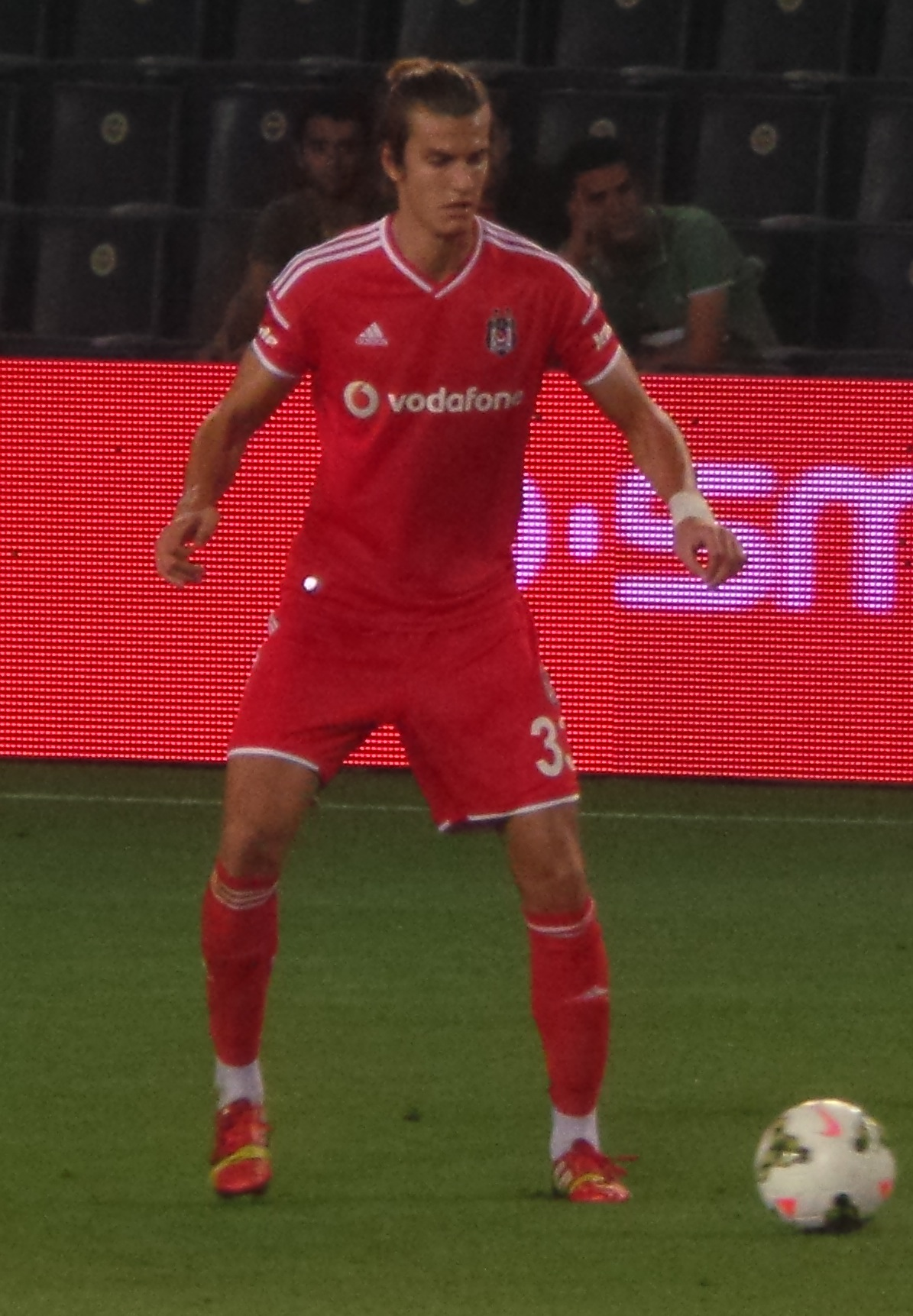
Played at youth level between 2006 and 2010 until his promotion to senior team, Beşiktaş capitalized €5m of income due to transfer of Atınç Nukan to RB Leipzig in 2015

Following players achieved to play at youth divisions of Beşiktaş at least 3 seasons, made their professional debut at Beşiktaş senior squad and, represented their country at youth (at least U-19) or full international levels:

Player	Youth Period	International Caps	Senior Debut	Manager (Note: The coach who was managing senior team on debut date.)
(Turkey) Süleyman Seba	1943–1946	Turkey fullcaps (1 time)	1946–47 Istanbul Football League	(Turkey) Refik Osman Top
(Turkey) Yusuf Tunaoğlu	1958–1962	Turkey fullcaps (6 times)	1961–62 Turkish National League	
(Turkey) Sanlı Sarıalioğlu	1959–1962	Turkey fullcaps (21 times)	1961–62 Turkish National League	
(Turkey) Süleyman Oktay	−1977	Turkey fullcaps (1 time)	1977–78 1.Lig	
(Turkey) Ziya Doğan	1971–1978	Turkey fullcaps (1 time)	1978–79 1.Lig	
(Turkey) Rıza Çalımbay	1970–1980	Turkey fullcaps (38 times)	1980–81 1.Lig	(Federal Republic of Yugoslavia) Đorđe Milić
(Turkey) Sinan Engin	1974–1981	Turkey U21 (2 times)	1982–83 1.Lig	(Federal Republic of Yugoslavia) Đorđe Milić
(Turkey) Sergen Yalçın	1982–1991	Turkey fullcaps (37 times)	Age 18 v Gençlerbirliği, 1 September 1991	(England) Gordon Milne
(Turkey) Yasin Sülün	1989–1996	Turkey U-21 (10 times)	Age 19 v Kocaelispor, 11 April 1998	(Wales) John Toshack
(Turkey) Nihat Kahveci	1996–1997	Turkey fullcaps (69 times)	Age 18 v. Bursaspor, 9 November 1997	(Wales) John Toshack
(Turkey) Tunç Kip	1996–1999	Turkey U-21 (13 times)	Age 18 v. Çanakkale Dardanelspor, 18 March 1999	(Germany) Karl-Heinz Feldkamp
(Turkey) Ali Cansun Begeçarslan	1998–2001	Turkey U-21 (1 time)	Age 18 v. Siirtspor, 19 May 2001	(Germany) Christoph Daum
(Turkey) Serdar Özkan	1999–2003	Turkey fullcaps (3 times)	Age 17 v. Kocaelispor, 17 December 2003	(Romania) Mircea Lucescu
(Turkey) Sezer Sezgin	1999–2005	Turkey U-20 (9 times)	Age 19 v. İstanbulspor, 15 May 2005	(Turkey) Rıza Çalımbay
(Turkey) Mehmet Sedef	2000–2005	Turkey U-20 (1 time)	Age 17 v. Akçaabat Sebatspor, 28 May 2005	(Turkey) Rıza Çalımbay
(Turkey) İbrahim Kaş	2000–2005	Turkey fullcaps (7 times)	Age 19 v. Akçaabat Sebatspor, 28 May 2005	(Turkey) Rıza Çalımbay
(Turkey) Nail Tilbaç	2001–2006	Turkey U-19 (1 time)	Age 17 v. Gaziantepspor, 20 November 2005	(France) Jean Tigana
(Turkey) Emre Özkan	2002–2006	Turkey U-21 (6 times)	Age 18 v. Sarıyer S.K., 21 February 2006	(France) Jean Tigana
(Turkey) Batuhan Karadeniz	2003–2007	Turkey fullcaps (2 times)	Age 16 v Kasımpaşa S.K., 11 October 2007	(Turkey) Ertuğrul Sağlam
(Turkey) Bülent Uzun	2003–2007	Turkey U-19 (2 times)	Age 18 v. Kasımpaşa S.K., 19 January 2008	(Turkey) Ertuğrul Sağlam
(Turkey) Ali Kuçik	2004–2009	Turkey U-21 (2 times)	Age 17 v. Diskispor, 5 January 2008	(Turkey) Ertuğrul Sağlam
(Turkey) Necip Uysal	2004–2009	Turkey fullcaps (1 time)	Age 18 v. Eskişehirspor, 24 November 2009	(Turkey) Mustafa Denizli
(Turkey) Atınç Nukan	2006–2010	Turkey fullcaps (1 time)	Age 16 v. Manisaspor, 7 May 2010	(Turkey) Mustafa Denizli
(Turkey) Muhammed Demirci	2006–2010	Turkey U-21 (5 times)	Age 16 v. Gaziantep B.B., 3 March 2011	(Germany) Bernd Schuster
(Turkey) Hasan Türk	2006–2012	Turkey U-20 (6 times)	Age 19 v İstanbul B.B., 19 August 2012	(Portugal) Carlos Carvalhal
(Turkey) Cumali Bişi	2007–2010	Turkey U-20 (7 times)	Age 17 v. Bursaspor, 16 May 2010	(Turkey) Mustafa Denizli
(Turkey) Kadir Arı	2008–2012	Turkey U-20 (3 times)	Age 18 v. Niğde Belediyespor, 25 September 2012	(Turkey) Samet Aybaba
(Turkey) Fatih Aksoy	2013–2017	Turkey U-20 (3 times)	Age 20 v. Kayserispor, 25 November 2017	(Turkey) Şenol Güneş
(Turkey) Erdem Seçgin	2013–2018	Turkey U-20 (1 time)	Age 18 v. Sarpsborg 08 FF, 29 November 2018	(Turkey) Şenol Güneş
(Turkey) Kerem Kalafat	2013–2019	Turkey U-19 (4 times)	Age 18 v. Wolverhampton Wanderers, 12 December 2019	(Turkey) Abdullah Avcı
(Turkey) Rıdvan Yılmaz	2009–2019	Turkey fullcaps (4 times)	Age 18 v. Çaykur Rizespor, 8 April 2019	(Turkey) Abdullah Avcı
(Turkey) Kartal Yılmaz	2012–2019	Turkey U-21 (2 times)	Age 18 v. S.C. Braga, 24 October 2019	(Turkey) Abdullah Avcı
(Turkey) Erdoğan Kaya	2016–2019	Turkey U-19 (9 times)	Age 18 v. Wolverhampton Wanderers, 12 December 2019	(Turkey) Abdullah Avcı
(Turkey) Ersin Destanoğlu	2013–2017	Turkey U-21 (5 times)	Age 19 v. Antalyaspor, 13 June 2020	(Turkey) Sergen Yalçın
(Turkey) Serdar Saatçı	2014–2020	Turkey U-21 (4 times)	Age 17 v. Tarsus İdman Yurdu, 17 December 2020	(Turkey) Sergen Yalçın
(Azerbaijan) Berkay Vardar	2016–2021	Azerbaijan U-19 (3 times)	Age 18 v. Ajax, 28 September 2021	(Turkey) Sergen Yalçın
(Turkey) Emirhan İlkhan	2014–2021	Turkey U-21 (2 times)	Age 18 v. Antalyaspor, 5 January 2022	(Turkey) Önder Karaveli
(Turkey) Emre Bilgin	2014–2020	Turkey U-19 (1 time)	Age 18 v. Hatayspor, 19 March 2022	(Turkey) Önder Karaveli
