= Turkish Amateur Football Championship =

Türkiye Amatör Futbol Şampiyonası
- Founded: 1952
- Folded: 1996
- Country: Turkey
- Domestic cup(s): Chancellor Cup, Turkish Cup
- Last champions: Diyarbakır DSİ Spor (1st title)
- Most championships: İzmir Denizgücü (4 titles)

The Turkish Amateur Football Championship or Turkish Amateur Teams Championship (Turkish: Türkiye Amatör Futbol Şampiyonası) was a former amateur football championship in Turkey. It was organised by the Turkish Football Federation. The championship format was based on a knockout competition. It was held from 1952 to 1996. After 1951, when the former top-level Turkish Football Championship was folded, this competition succeeded it, being no longer the first tier championship in Turkey with only amateur teams as participants.

İzmir Denizgücü is the most successful club with four titles.

== Champions ==
Year	Winners	Runners-up
1952	Galatasaray(1)	?
1953	not held	
1954	Adana Demirspor (1)	Hacettepe SK
1955	Bursa Acar İdman Yurdu (1)	Karagümrük
1956	Ankara Karagücü (1)	Bursa Merinosspor
1957	Muhafızgücü (1)	?
1958	Ankara Havagücü (1); Trabzon İdmanocağı (1)	Bursa Güvenspor
1959	Bursa Güvenspor (1)	?
1960	Sakarya Yıldırımspor (1)	Samsun Fener Gençlik
1961	İzmir Karagücü (1)	?
1962	İzmir Karagücü (2)	Eskişehir Şekerspor
1963	Çukurova İdman Yurdu (1)	?
1964	Trabzon İdmanocağı (2)	?
1965	İzmit Kağıtspor (1)	Samsun Yolspor
1966	Trabzon İdmanocağı (3)	?
1967	İzmir Denizgücü (1)	?
1968	İzmir Denizgücü (2)	?
1969	Sebat Gençlik (1)	?
1970	Muhafızgücü (2)	?
1971	İzmir Denizgücü (3)	?
1972	Trabzon Gençlerbirliği (1)	?
1973	İzmir Denizgücü (4)	?
1974	Zonguldak Erdemirspor (1)	?
1975	Orduspor (Amateurs) (1)	?
1976	Bursaspor (Amateurs) (1)	?
1977	Ankara Demirspor (1)	?
1978	Sakarya Karadenizspor (1)	Muhafızgücü
1979	Kayseri Sümerspor (1)	?
1980	Ankara DSİ Spor (1)	?
1981	İstanbul Yeldeğirmeni (1)	?
1982	İzmit Kağıtspor (2)	?
1983	Maraşspor (1)	Sakarya Karadenizspor
1984	Tarsus İdman Yurdu Erkutspor (1)	?
1985	Beşiktaş Amatör (1)	?
1986	Bursaspor (Amateurs) (2)	?
1987	Hatay Sahilspor (1)	?
1988	Beşiktaş Amatör (2)	Kayseri Emniyetspor
1989	Adana Gençlerbirliği (1)	Maltepespor
1990	Çengelköyspor (1)	Ankara Polisgücü
1991	not held	
1992	İçel Polisgücü (1)	Dikilitaş SK
1993	Diyarbakır DSİ Spor (1)	?
1994	not held (only the group matches were played, the finals were not held)	
1995	not held (only the group matches were played, the finals were not held)	
1996	not held (only the group matches were played, the finals were not held)	

== Performance by club ==
Rank	Club	Titles	Years won
1	İzmir Denizgücü	4	1967, 1968, 1970, 1973
2	Trabzon İdmanocağı	3	1958, 1964, 1966
3	Muhafızgücü	2	1957, 1970
3	Beşiktaş Amatör	2	1985, 1988
3	Bursaspor (Amateurs)	2	1976, 1986
3	İzmir Karagücü	2	1961, 1962
3	İzmit Kağıtspor	2	1965, 1982
4	Adana Demirspor	1	1954
4	Adana Gençlerbirliği	1	1989
4	Ankara Demirspor	1	1977
4	Ankara DSİ Spor	1	1980
4	Ankara Havagücü	1	1958
4	Ankara Karagücü	1	1956
4	Bursa Acar İdman Yurdu	1	1965
4	Bursa Güvenspor	1	1959
4	Çukurova İdman Yurdu	1	1963
4	Diyarbakır DSİ Spor	1	1993
4	Galatasaray (Amateurs)	1	1952
4	Hatay Sahilspor	1	1987
4	İçel Polisgücü	1	1992
4	Çengelköyspor	1	1990
4	İstanbul Yeldeğirmeni	1	1981
4	Sakarya Karadenizspor	1	1978
4	Kayseri Sümerspor	1	1979
4	Maraşspor	1	1983
4	Orduspor (Amateurs)	1	1975
4	Sakarya Yıldırımspor	1	1960
4	Tarsus İdman Yurdu Erkutspor	1	1984
4	Trabzon Gençlerbirliği	1	1972
4	Sebat Gençlik	1	1969
4	Zonguldak Erdemirspor	1	1974

== See also ==
- Turkish Amateur Football Leagues
