= Mehmet Ekşi =

Turkish footballer and manager

Personal information
- Date of birth: 1 April 1953 (age 73)
- Place of birth: Elazığ, Turkey
- Positions: Defender; midfielder

Senior career*
Years	Team	Apps	(Gls)
1943–1955	Elazığspor		
1977–1979	Trabzonspor	39	(9)
1979–1984	Beşiktaş	118	(9)
1983–1984	→ Karagümrük (loan)	23	(4)
1984–1985	Antalyaspor	38	(4)
1985–1986	Konyaspor	14	(0)
1986–1987	Silivrispor	9	(0)

International career
1978	Turkey U21	2	(0)
1978–1981	Turkey	6	(0)

Managerial career
- 1989–1990: Feriköy S.K.
- 1991–1992: Elazığspor
- 1994–1995: Nişantaşıspor
- 1998: MKE Kırıkkalespor
- 1999–2000: Feriköy S.K.
- 2000: Çaykur Rizespor (assistant)
- 2000–20001: Kocaelispor
- 2001–2002: Maltepespor
- 2002–2005: Beşiktaş J.K. Football Academy
- 2005: Beşiktaş (interim)
- 2007–2009: Beşiktaş J.K. Football Academy
- 2009: Sarıyer
- 2020: Beşiktaş J.K. Football Academy (director)
- * Club domestic league appearances and goals

Mehmet Ekşi (born 1 April 1953) is a Turkish former international football player and manager.

== Style of play ==
Although his primary position is defender, Ekşi was often deployed in midfield. During his career, Ekşi possessed renown attributes of strength, stamina, timing and aerial capability.

== Honours ==
Trabzonspor

- Süper Lig: 1978–79
- Turkish Cup: 1977–78, 1983–84
- Turkish Super Cup: 1978

Beşiktaş

- Süper Lig: 1981–82
- TSYD Cup: 1984

== Filmography ==
Year	Title	Role	Notes
1981	Gol Kralı	Himself	Uncredited
