= Trabzonspor U21 =

- Full name: Trabzonspor U21
- Nickname: Karadeniz Fırtınası (Black Sea Storm)
- Founded: 1972
- Ground: Mehmet Ali Yılmaz Facilities
- Capacity: 3,000
- Chairman: Ahmet Ağaoğlu
- Manager: Taner Yılmaz
- League: U21 Ligi
- 2018–19: 11th
Home colours	Away colours	Third colours

Trabzonspor U21 is a youth football team from Trabzonspor. The club competes in the U21 Ligi, against other U21 clubs in Turkey. An U21 team is made up of players between the ages of 18 and 20, and it is the last level of amateur play before a footballer reaches professional status in Turkey. The club was founded by former Trabzonspor footballer and manager Özkan Sümer in 1972. They were the first youth team in Turkey, and became an official branch of Trabzonspor in 1975. The club has won two league titles in 1996–97 and 2003–04.

== Honours ==
- U21 Ligi
  - Winners (3): 1991–92, 1996–97, 2003–04

== Current squad ==
As of 9 June 2010.

Note: Flags indicate national team as defined under FIFA eligibility rules; some limited exceptions apply. Players may hold more than one non-FIFA nationality.

No.	Pos.	Nation	Player
—	GK	TUR	Mücahit Atalay
—	GK	TUR	Cemil Şahin
—	GK	TUR	Yücel Solak
—	DF	TUR	Mert Ege Özeren
—	DF	TUR	Rasimcan Değirmenci
—	DF	TUR	Emre Özkan
—	DF	TUR	Hüseyin Kayıkçı
—	DF	TUR	Miraç Bulut
—	DF	TUR	Sinan Altınel

No.	Pos.	Nation	Player
—	DF	TUR	Şahin Çakır
—	MF	TUR	Furkan Sönmez
—	MF	TUR	Habib Şen
—	MF	TUR	Levent Küçüker
—	MF	TUR	Muhammet Mevdudi Meriç
—	MF	TUR	Semih Kaya
—	FW	TUR	Mustafa Akgün
—	FW	TUR	Sefa Sandıkçı

=== Former players ===
Trabzonspor has a notable youth academy, producing several Turkey national football team players including Hami Mandıralı, Gökdeniz Karadeniz, Fatih Tekke, Hüseyin Çimşir, Mehmet Yılmaz, Tolga Zengin, and Metin Aktaş. Gökdeniz Karadeniz is the most-capped Turkish international to come through the Trabzonspor academy.
