= U21 Ligi =

- Founded: 1989 as PAF Ligi
- First season: 1989–90
- Country: Turkey
- Confederation: UEFA
- Divisions: 4
- Number of clubs: 37
- Current champions: Galatasaray U21 (8th title)
- Most championships: Galatasaray U21 (8 titles)
- Website: A2 Ligi (in Turkish)

The U21 Ligi is the reserve team league for the top Turkish association football teams in the Süper Lig and 1. Lig. The league is split into western and an eastern division.

== History ==
The league started in 1989-1990 and was named TFF PAF Ligi (Profesyonelliğe Aday Futbolcular) until the 2008–09 season. The 1993–94 season was called TFF BAL Ligi (Deplasmanlı Bölgesel Altyapı Ligi). From 2009 till 2014 the league was called TFF A2 Ligi. Since the 2014–15 season the name has been U21 Ligi.

Teams are not relegated from the U21 Ligi based on their final league position, but on the league position of their respective clubs' senior teams. If a senior team is relegated from the 1. Lig, then the reserve team is relegated from the U21 Ligi and replaced by the reserve team of the promoted team from the 2. Lig.

Until 2009, only U21 teams of the Süper Lig could participate in the U21 Ligi. Since then, 1. Lig teams can participate and therefore the league is split into a western (20 teams) and eastern group (18 teams) and the winner of each group play a final match.

== Past winners ==
Season	Champions	Runners-up	3rd place
1989–90	Galatasaray SK U21 (1)		
1990–91	Beşiktaş JK U21 (1)		
1991–92	Trabzonspor U21 (1)	Altay SK U21	Sarıyer GK U21
1992–93	Altay SK U21 (1)	Kocaelispor U21	Konyaspor U21
1993–94	Galatasaray SK U21 (2)		
1994–95	Beşiktaş JK U21 (2)	Fenerbahçe SK U21	
1995–96	Beşiktaş JK U21 (3)	Fenerbahçe SK U21	
1996–97	Trabzonspor U21 (2)	Galatasaray SK U21	Kocaelispor U21
1997–98	Fenerbahçe SK U21 (1)	Beşiktaş JK U21	Trabzonspor U21
1998–99	Fenerbahçe SK U21 (2)	Bursaspor U21	Samsunspor U21
1999–2000	Beşiktaş JK U21 (4)	Gençlerbirliği SK U21	Samsunspor U21
2000–01	Fenerbahçe SK U21 (3)	Samsunspor U21	MKE Ankaragücü SK U21
2001–02	Gençlerbirliği SK U21 (1)	MKE Ankaragücü SK U21	Trabzonspor U21
2002–03	Beşiktaş JK U21 (5)	Altay SK U21	İstanbulspor U21
2003–04	Trabzonspor U21 (3)	Konyaspor U21	Galatasaray SK U21
2004–05	Galatasaray SK U21 (3)	Gaziantepspor U21	Samsunspor U21
2005–06	Galatasaray SK U21 (4)	Gençlerbirliği SK U21	Beşiktaş JK U21
2006–07	Galatasaray SK U21 (5)	Beşiktaş JK U21	Trabzonspor U21
2007–08	Sivasspor U21 (1)	Galatasaray SK U21	Gençlerbirliği SK U21
2008–09	Antalyaspor U21 (1)	Fenerbahçe SK U21	Galatasaray SK U21
2009–10	Gençlerbirliği SK U21 (2)	Ankaraspor U21	-
2010–11	Galatasaray SK U21 (6)	Kayseri Erciyesspor U21	-
2011–12	Kartal S.K. U21 (1)	Bucaspor U21	Sivasspor U21
2012–13	Ankaraspor U21 (1)	Gençlerbirliği SK U21	Kasımpaşa SK U21
2013–14	Fenerbahçe SK U21 (4)	Boluspor U21	Çaykur Rizespor U21
2014–15	Galatasaray SK U21 (7)	Bursaspor U21	Gençlerbirliği SK U21
2015–16	Bursaspor U21 (1)	Altınordu F.K. U21	
2016–17	Fenerbahçe SK U21 (5)	Beşiktaş JK U21	Trabzonspor U21
2017–18	Beşiktaş JK U21 (6)	Gençlerbirliği SK U21	Trabzonspor U21
2018–19	Galatasaray SK U21 (8)	Beşiktaş JK U21	Bursaspor U21

== Performance by club ==
Team	Titles	Years won
Galatasaray SK U21	8	1990, 1994, 2005, 2006, 2007, 2011, 2015, 2019
Beşiktaş JK U21	6	1991, 1995, 1996, 2000, 2003, 2018
Fenerbahçe SK U21	5	1998, 1999, 2001, 2014, 2017
Trabzonspor U21	3	1992, 1997, 2004
Gençlerbirliği SK U21	2	2002, 2010
Altay SK U21	1	1993
Sivasspor U21	1	2008
Antalyaspor U21	1	2009
Kartal SK U21	1	2012
Ankaraspor U21	1	2013
Bursaspor U21	1	2016

== See also ==
- Football records in Turkey
