= Gaziantepspor A2 =

Gaziantepspor
- Full name: Gaziantepspor Kulübü
- Nickname: Şahinler (The Falcons)
- Founded: 25 February 1969
- Dissolved: 31 July 2020
- Ground: Celal Doğan Training Center
- Chairman: (Turkey) İbrahim Halil Kızıl
- League: A2 Ligi
- 2010–11: TFF A2 League, 7nd
Home colours	Away colours

Gaziantepspor A2 is the under-20 squad of Gaziantepspor They play in the Turkish A2 league, along with fellow A2 teams from other clubs. 2019–20 season, the club withdrew in the Amateur League with -15 points and finished the league in the last place and Gaziantepspor together with went bankrupt and closed its activities.

== A2 squad ==
Note: Flags indicate national team as defined under FIFA eligibility rules; some limited exceptions apply. Players may hold more than one non-FIFA nationality.

No.	Pos.	Nation	Player
—	GK	TUR	Cuma Bezgin
—	DF	TUR	Enes Erensoy
—	DF	TUR	Ahmet Caner Polat
—	MF	TUR	Feyyaz Şeker
—	MF	TUR	Mehmet Coşkun
—	MF	TUR	İzzet Sağlam
—	GK	TUR	Kemal Canlı
—	DF	TUR	Halil İbrahim Kır
—	DF	TUR	Uğur Delibaş

No.	Pos.	Nation	Player
—	MF	TUR	Yusuf Kaya
—	MF	TUR	Serdar Deniz
—	FW	TUR	M. Fuat Gölbaşı
—	DF	TUR	Alper Urkay
—	DF	TUR	Eyüp Ertürk
—	DF	TUR	Ali İhsan Yılmaz
—	MF	TUR	Aytunç Öden
—	MF	TUR	Ramazan KOYUN
—	FW	TUR	Ömer Faruk Kılınç

== Honours ==
- PAF League
  - Runners-up (2): 2004–05, 2005–06
