= Süleyman Oktay =

Turkish footballer and manager

Personal information
- Full name: İsmail Süleyman Oktay
- Date of birth: 9 January 1959 (age 67)
- Place of birth: Istanbul, Turkey
- Position: Defender

Youth career
- –1977: Beşiktaş Academy

Senior career*
Years	Team	Apps	(Gls)
1977–1984	Beşiktaş	99	(5)
Total		99	(5)

International career
1979	Turkey U-21	2	(0)
1981	Turkey	1	(0)

Managerial career
- 2000–2002: Beşiktaş J.K. Football Academy
- * Club domestic league appearances and goals

İsmail Süleyman Oktay (born 9 January 1959) is a Turkish former international footballer and manager.

== Career ==
Oktay played his entire career at Beşiktaş J.K.. He was promoted to senior team in 1978, along with then-youth fellows Ziya Doğan and Fuat Yaman.

He represented Turkey at senior level one time on 7 October 1981, against Soviet Union in which Turkey was defeated 3–0 at 1982 FIFA World Cup qualification phase.

== Achievements ==
- Süper Lig (1): 1981–82
- Prime Minister's Cup (1): 1977
- TSYD Cup (1): 1984
