= Hrdlička =

Hrdlička (feminine Hrdličková) is a Czech surname. Notable people with the surname include:

- Aleš Hrdlička (1869–1943), Czech-American anthropologist
- Alfred Hrdlicka (1928–2009), Austrian sculptor, draughtsman and painter
- Franz Hrdlicka (1920–1945), German Luftwaffe pilot
- Ivan Hrdlička (born 1943), Slovak football player
- Jayne Hrdlicka, managing director and chief executive in Australia
- Josef Hrdlička (born 1942), Czech Roman Catholic bishop and poet
- Karolína Plíšková Hrdličková, Czech tennis player
- Květa Hrdličková Peschke, Czech tennis player
- Libor Hrdlička (born 1986), Slovak football player
- Petr Hrdlička (born 1967), Czech sports shooter
- Tomáš Hrdlička (born 1982), Czech football player

== See also ==
- Roberto Herlitzka (born 1937), Italian film actor
