= Ali Cansun Begeçarslan =

Turkish footballer

Personal information
- Date of birth: 18 September 1982 (age 44)
- Place of birth: Istanbul, Turkey
- Height: 1.85 m (6 ft 1 in)
- Position: Forward

Youth career
- 1997–1998: Akatlarspor
- 1998–2001: Beşiktaş

Senior career*
Years	Team	Apps	(Gls)
2001–2004	Beşiktaş	7	(2)
2003–2004	→ Gençlerbirliği (loan)	3	(0)
2004–2005	Sakaryaspor	22	(5)
2005–2006	Gençlerbirliği	20	(4)
2006–2007	Antalyaspor	20	(0)
2007–2008	Gaziantepspor	14	(3)
2008–2009	Neftçi Baku	15	(4)
2009–2010	Hacettepe S.K.	6	(1)
2010	Kocaelispor	9	(1)
2010–2011	Diyarbakırspor	10	(1)
2011	Adana Demirspor	9	(0)
2011–2014	Eyüpspor	41	(10)
2015	Leventspor	9	(1)

International career
1999–2000	Turkey U17	8	(1)
2000	Turkey U18	2	(0)
2002	Turkey U21	1	(0)
- * Club domestic league appearances and goals

Ali Cansun Begeçarslan (born 18 September 1982) is a Turkish former professional football player.

== Career ==
Successfully promoted from Beşiktaş PAF, youth section of Beşiktaş J.K. in 2001, Cansun was a part of title-winning squad of Beşiktaş at its centenary year in 2003.

== Personal life ==
Begeçarslan is an Beşiktaş avid fan. His father is emigrated Turkey from Albania. He is married and have one son, named Berk Ali.

== Honours ==
Beşiktaş

- Süper Lig (1): 2002–03
