= Yasin Sülün =

Turkish footballer

Personal information
- Full name: Yasin Sülün
- Date of birth: 17 December 1977 (age 48)
- Place of birth: Istanbul, Turkey
- Height: 1.83 m (6 ft 0 in)
- Position: Midfielder

Youth career
- 1989–1996: Beşiktaş PAF

Senior career*
Years	Team	Apps	(Gls)
1996–2005	Beşiktaş J.K.	127	(5)
2004–2005	→ Diyarbakırspor (loan)	21	(1)
2005–2006	Bursaspor	8	(0)
2006	Altay	5	(0)
2006–2008	Kasımpaşa	39	(1)
2008	→ Kocaelispor (loan)	10	(0)
2008–2009	Adana Demirspor	12	(0)
2008–2010	Sarıyer	19	(1)
Total		241	(8)

International career
1998–2000	Turkey U-21	10	(0)

Managerial career
- 2011–2012: Beşiktaş U-18
- 2012–2014: Beşiktaş U-17
- 2014–2015: Beşiktaş U-19
- 2015–2019: Beşiktaş U-21
- 2019–2020: Beşiktaş U-17
- * Club domestic league appearances and goals

Yasin Sülün (born 17 December 1977) is a Turkish football coach and a former player. During his playing career, Sülün played professionally at Beşiktaş J.K., Diyarbakırspor, Bursaspor, Altay S.K., Kasımpaşa S.K., Kocaelispor, Adana Demirspor and Sarıyer S.K.

== Career ==
Yasin Sülün started his career at Beşiktaş J.K. where he played for 15 years, including his youth tenure. Promoted to the senior team by Welsh manager John Toschack, Sülün made his professional debut against Kocaelispor on 11 April 1998, which Beşiktaş lost with 3–2 final score.

He represented Turkey 10 times at U-21 level between 1998 and 2000.
