= Niyazi Güney =

Turkish footballer and coach

Personal information
- Full name: Niyazi Güney
- Date of birth: 26 April 1974 (age 52)
- Place of birth: Trabzon, Turkey
- Position: Midfielder

Youth career
- 1993–1994: PTT

Senior career*
Years	Team	Apps	(Gls)
1993–1996	PTT	39	(2)
1996–2000	Gaziantepspor	59	(0)
1999	Karabükspor	16	(0)
2000–2002	Ankaragücü	61	(9)
2002–2003	Beşiktaş J.K.	6	(1)
2003–2004	Konyaspor	25	(1)
2004	Ankaragücü	5	(0)
2005	Diyarbakırspor	7	(0)
2005–2006	Ankaragücü	25	(2)
2006	Mardinspor	9	(0)
2007	Uşakspor	15	(2)
2008	Pendikspor	9	(1)
Total		276	(18)

Managerial career
- 2010–2011: Gençlerbirliği (academy coach)
- 2011–2012: Hacettepe S.K. (academy coach)
- * Club domestic league appearances and goals

Niyazi Güney (born 26 April 1974) is a Turkish former association football player and coach. During his career, his most notable success was winning the Süper Lig title in the 2002–03 season while playing for Beşiktaş J.K.

== Honours ==
Beşiktaş

- Süper Lig: 2002–03

PTT

- TFF Third League: 1994–95
