= Husin =

Husin can be a masculine given name or a surname. Notable people with the name include:

== Given name ==
- Husin Ahmad (born 1944), Bruneian diplomat and military officer
- Husin Din (1953–2021), Malaysian politician
- Husin Kamaluddin (died c. 1770), Sultan of Brunei
- Husin Lubis, Indonesian actor
- Husin Yusuf (born 1955), Indonesian politician

== Surname ==
- Andriy Husin (1972–2014), Ukrainian football player and coach
- Azahari Husin, Malaysian engineer
- Djohar Arifin Husin (born 1950), Indonesian chairman and former footballer
- Izani Husin (born 1963), Malaysian politician and physician
- Noor Husin (born 1997), Afghan footballer
- Saleh Husin (born 1963), Indonesian politician
- Suhaimi Husin (born 1994), Malaysian footballer

== See also ==
- Syed Husin Ali (1936–2024), Malaysian academic and politician
- Hussein, Arabic masculine given name
