= Mithat Yavaş =

Turkish footballer

Personal information
- Date of birth: 16 January 1975 (age 51)
- Place of birth: West Germany
- Height: 1.86 m (6 ft 1 in)
- Position: Midfielder

Senior career*
Years	Team	Apps	(Gls)
1995–2002	Samsunspor		
2001–2002	→ Malatyaspor (loan)		
2002–2004	Malatyaspor		
2004–2005	Kayserispor		
2005	Manisaspor		
2006–2007	Çanakkale Dardanelspor		
- * Club domestic league appearances and goals

Mithat Yavaş (born 16 January 1975) is a Turkish former professional footballer who played as a midfielder.
