= Serpil Hamdi Tüzün =

Turkish football coach

Serpil Hamdi Tüzün is a Turkish football coach who coached the Beşiktaş J.K. senior team for the 1979–80 season. Primarily a youth coach, he worked with the youth of Beşiktaş representing some of the finest names to the football stage. He also worked as a youth coach for the Turkey national youth football team, collecting a European under-18 championship gold medal in 1992. Tüzün came second in the same tournament in 1993. Tüzün worked as a youth coach in Azerbaijan as well. He worked in Ajax as an intern with Ștefan Kovács. He developed many football players in the Beşiktaş youth team, such as Sergen Yalcin, Feyyaz Ucar, Ali Gultiken, and Metin Tekin.
