= Cüneyt Yis =

Turkish footballer

Personal information
- Date of birth: 11 August 1976 (age 50)
- Place of birth: İzmir, Turkey
- Position: Midfielder

Senior career*
Years	Team	Apps	(Gls)
1997–1998	İzmirspor		
1998–1999	Altay		
1999–2001	Konyaspor		
2001–2003	İzmirspor		
2003–2005	Kayserispor		
2005–2006	Şanlıurfaspor		
2006–2007	Mersin Idmanyurdu		
2007–2008	Alanyaspor		
2008	İzmirspor		
2008–2010	Körfez Belediyespor		
- * Club domestic league appearances and goals

Cüneyt Yis (born 11 August 1976) is a Turkish retired football midfielder.
