= Hatay Sahilspor =

İskenderun Sahilspor
- Full name: İskenderun Sahilspor
- Ground: 5 Temmuz Stadium, İskenderun
- Capacity: 12400

İskenderun Sahilspor is a defunct sports club of İskenderun, Turkey.

== Stadium ==
The team used to play at the 12400 capacity 5 Temmuz Stadium.

== League participations ==
- TFF Second League: 1987–1993

== League performances ==
Season	League	Pos	Pld	W	D	L	PF	PA	Pts
1987–88	TFF Second League – 3rd Group	7	32	12	8	12	32	35	44
1988–89	TFF Second League – 3rd Group	8	30	9	10	11	29	42	37
1989–90	TFF Second League – 3rd Group	12	32	8	9	15	30	43	33
1990–91	TFF Second League – 3rd Group	10	34	12	7	15	47	58	43
1991–92	TFF Second League – 3rd Group	13	36	11	11	14	36	54	44
1992–93	TFF Second League – 3rd Group	13	30	9	6	15	36	39	33

Promotion
Relegation

Source: mackolik: Hatay Sahilspor
