= Sergen Yalçın =

Turkish manager

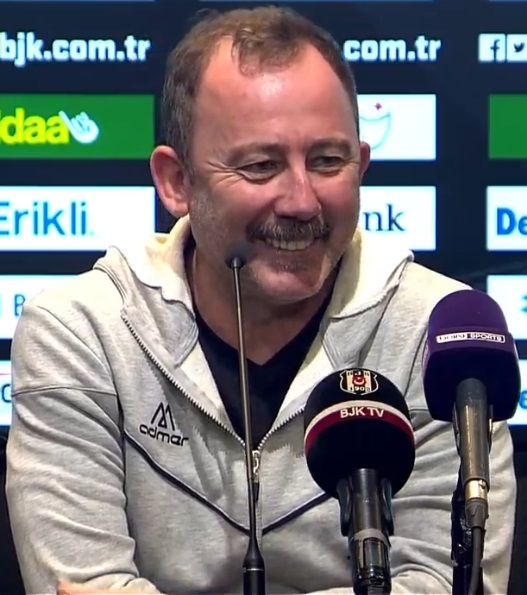
- Yalçın in 2019

Personal information
- Full name: Ali Rıza Sergen Yalçın
- Date of birth: 5 November 1972 (age 54)
- Place of birth: Istanbul, Turkey
- Height: 1.81 m (5 ft 11 in)
- Position: Midfielder

Team information
- Current team: Turkey (head coach)

Youth career
- 1982–1991: Beşiktaş

Senior career*
| Years | Team | Apps | (Gls) |
| 1991–1997 | Beşiktaş | 158 | (46) |
| 1997–1999 | İstanbulspor | 40 | (15) |
| 1999–2002 | Siirt Jet-Pa Spor | 0 | (0) |
| 1999 | → Fenerbahçe (loan) | 24 | (8) |
| 1999–2000 | → Galatasaray (loan) | 21 | (6) |
| 2000–2001 | → Trabzonspor (loan) | 21 | (1) |
| 2001–2002 | → Galatasaray (loan) | 18 | (7) |
| 2002–2006 | Beşiktaş | 100 | (30) |
| 2006–2007 | Etimesgut Şekerspor | 23 | (13) |
| 2007–2008 | Eskişehirspor | 21 | (6) |
| Total | | 426 | (132) |

International career
| 1989 | Turkey U-16 | 2 | (0) |
| 1990 | Turkey U-18 | 2 | (0) |
| 1992–1993 | Turkey U-21 | 12 | (5) |
| 1994–2003 | Turkey | 41 | (5) |

Managerial career
- 2013–2014: Gaziantepspor
- 2014–2015: Sivasspor
- 2016: Gaziantepspor
- 2017: Kayserispor
- 2017: Eskişehirspor
- 2018: Konyaspor
- 2018–2019: Alanyaspor
- 2019–2020: Yeni Malatyaspor
- 2020–2021: Beşiktaş
- 2024: Antalyaspor
- 2025–2026: Beşiktaş
- 2026–: Turkey
Medal record
Representing Turkey
Men's football
Mediterranean Games
| Gold medal – first place | 1993 |
- * Club domestic league appearances and goals

Ali Rıza Sergen Yalçın (Turkish pronunciation: [ali ˈɾɯzaː ˈsæɾɟæn ˈjaɫtʃɯn]; born 5 November 1972), known as Sergen Yalçın, is a Turkish professional football manager and former player. He is the head coach of the Turkey national football team. Yalçın is the first individual in Turkish football to win the Süper Lig both as a player and a manager with Beşiktaş.

During his playing career, Yalçın was an attacking midfielder known for his vision, creativity, and ability to dictate games. He spent the majority of his club career in Turkey, most notably with Beşiktaş, where he became a fan favorite. He also represented other major Turkish clubs, including Fenerbahçe, Galatasaray, and Trabzonspor, a rare feat in Turkish football. Internationally, he earned 37 caps and scored 5 goals for the Turkey national team, participating in UEFA Euro 1996 and UEFA Euro 2000.

After retiring as a player, Yalçın transitioned into management, taking charge of several Turkish clubs before returning to Beşiktaş as head coach in 2020. In his first full season, he led the club to a historic domestic double, winning the Süper Lig and the Turkish Cup. Despite his success, he resigned in December 2021 following a series of poor results, including a winless UEFA Champions League campaign.

== Club career ==
=== Early career and rise to stardom (1989–2001) ===
Sergen began at Beşiktaş in the 1991–92 season and quickly became renowned for his skill and creativity. His first spell at the club saw him score 46 goals in 158 games – no mean feat for a midfielder. However, it was known that Sergen lacked professionalism. After a 4–1 defeat to Samsunspor, he was publicly criticised by the Beşiktaş deputy president due to his careless lifestyle. Sergen responded to the club official by insulting him.

If he doesn’t leave the board, from tomorrow I will not turn out for training or for matches. Let him wear the No 10 shirt and play in the Beşiktaş midfield.

Subsequently, Beşiktaş imposed a club-record fine of over £150,000. He was later forgiven after apologising, but the fine stayed. Sergen then demanded a new and improved contract which was denied by the board.

As expected, Sergen departed from the club and became Turkey's record signing when he moved to İstanbulspor for £5.5m in the 1997–98 season. Thereafter, Sergen desired a move to the European fields and began contract negotiations with Internazionale and Milan. Terms could not be met with the Italian giants. After struggling with his weight due to months of inaction, İstanbulspor failed to offload him, so Jet-Pa (a sports company) bought his contract and arranged a loan deal with Fenerbahçe during the 1998–99 season, which involved him wearing a personalised shirt promoting the company.

Under the coaching firstly from Joachim Löw and Rıdvan Dilmen, he seemed to have buckled down to the task. But when Zdenek Zeman took over, Sergen was consistently engaged in trench warfare. Sergen publicly criticised Zeman for trying to play him on the wing, which he believed was not his best position, and was accused of faking injury to avoid training sessions. Along with many other incidents, the final straw came with the home game against Bursaspor during the 1999–2000 season. When he eventually came on as a substitute, Sergen missed a simple scoring chance, which many fans believed to have been a deliberate miss as an act of protest or pure spite. In the late stages of the game, with the score locked at 2–2, he further infuriated the supporters by strolling across to take a corner as though he had all the time in the world. Midway through the season, Sergen had his contract terminated by Fenerbahçe. Due to his terrific individual showings for the Turkey national football team, Sergen attracted attention from several foreign clubs. There were speculations about a move to Barcelona, Bayern Munich, or Borussia Dortmund.

Despite heavy speculation, Sergen finished the 1999–2000 season at arch-rivals Galatasaray and displayed impressive showings to help Galatasaray achieve the domestic double. Sergen signed for the club too late in the season to be eligible for the UEFA Cup campaign, and as Galatasaray made the trip to Leeds for the second tie of the semi-final, Sergen was instructed to report to training in Istanbul. However, instead of continuing his training in Istanbul, he took a little trip of his own to Northern Cyprus. While casinos were banned on the Turkish mainland, they remained open in Northern Cyprus, which attracted quite a lot of gambling trade from Turkey. It attracted Sergen for precisely that reason, and he spent much of his brief stay there in a casino. When he returned to Istanbul, he told manager Fatih Terim he was tired from the journey and asked if he could skip a training session. Terim, a fearsome disciplinarian, reacted explosively. Sergen skipped title celebrations after the Galatasaray board made it clear they would not have him back next season.

After UEFA Euro 2000, Sergen was on the verge of a transfer to Newcastle United, with manager Bobby Robson being a long-time admirer. The deal fell through, and he instead moved to Trabzonspor for the 2000–01 season, becoming the first player to have represented the big four clubs in Turkey. Sergen had never yet played for a club outside Istanbul, and it was believed that removing him from the distractions of the big city would do good for his appalling disciplinary record. Ironically, it turned out to be the most unsuccessful season of his career. At the season's end, Trabzonspor did not wish to extend his loan deal.

Fatih Terim gave up on him at Galatasaray. Zdenek Zeman could not work with him at Fenerbahçe. He publicly criticised former national coach Mustafa Denizli after UEFA Euro 2000. British coach Gordon Milne, who worked with him at Beşiktaş, also despaired of trying to get Sergen – and his magical left foot – to the training ground on time. It was thought to be the end of Sergen Yalçın, the great ‘‘enfant terrible’’ of Turkish football.

=== Journeyman years and legacy in Turkish football (2001–2007) ===
Ahead of the 2001–02 season, Galatasaray manager Mircea Lucescu took a gamble and signed Sergen on loan (still from Siirt-Jet). He cast Sergen as the natural successor to Gheorghe Hagi.

This is his last chance, and he is well aware of this. I wanted Sergen, and I know he will truly show me who Sergen Yalçın is. His talent is obvious, and now he will finally be seen on the international stage. He will be born again.

The move was rewarded as Sergen repaid his manager’s faith by starring in the UEFA Champions League with two goals and two assists as Galatasaray progressed to the second group stage. Unfortunately, Sergen tore his knee ligaments and missed the rest of the season. He was told to lose weight or never play football again. After elimination from the UEFA Champions League, Mircea Lucescu insisted that if Sergen had remained fit, Galatasaray would have gone on to win the tournament. Nevertheless, Galatasaray won the league title.

In the 2002–03 season, after years of wandering, Sergen returned home to Beşiktaş. Sergen was signed on a permanent deal by Mircea Lucescu, who had also moved to Beşiktaş. Under the tutelage of Lucescu, whispers began that perhaps Sergen’s talent had finally been tamed. Sergen was finally maturing to fulfill some of his long-lost potential. Beşiktaş won the league title that season, with Sergen being the key instigator.

The 2003–04 season marked Beşiktaş’ return to the UEFA Champions League, where Sergen featured in arguably the most memorable match of his career. Roman Abramovich, who had recently become the owner of Chelsea, spent £112m on quality transfers, assembling a team of "invincibles". Ahead of their match against Beşiktaş at Stamford Bridge, Chelsea was undefeated in the Abramovich era. However, Beşiktaş shocked the footballing world by winning 2–0, with both goals scored by Sergen. Although Beşiktaş was eliminated in the group stage, Sergen once again proved his class by scoring two goals and providing three assists in six matches.

In the same season, Sergen produced another remarkable moment during a match against Çaykur Rizespor in the 2003–04 league. After winning the ball near the midfield, he initiated a brilliant solo run that ended with an assist to İlhan Mansız, who finished the move with a goal. This performance earned Sergen the "Goal of the Year" award.

Before the 2006–07 season, manager Jean Tigana did not see Sergen as part of his future plans, and as a result, Beşiktaş terminated his contract with immediate effect. This enraged the fans, as Sergen was regarded as a symbolic icon of the club. Upon his departure, Sergen stated that he would always remain a Beşiktaş fan.

Sergen spent the 2006–07 season with Etimesgut Şekerspor in the TFF Second League. He later joined Eskişehirspor in the 2007–08 season, where he played a key role in helping the team secure promotion to the Süper Lig. At the end of the season, he retired from professional football.

When Sergen was asked why he never moved to Europe, he simply replied, "If I was 20 again, I would leave Turkey within three days."

== International career ==
=== Under-23s ===
Sergen played on the Turkey national under-23 football team at the 1993 Mediterranean Games, which they won by defeating France U21s in the semifinal and Algeria U23s in the final.

=== Senior team ===
Sergen made his senior debut in a friendly game against Macedonia in 1994. He would represent his nation in Euro 1996 and 2000, but injury prevented him from featuring at the FIFA World Cup in 2002. Sergen scored a total of 5 goals in 37 matches for the Turkey national team.

==== Euro 1996 ====
UEFA Euro 1996 was Turkey's first tournament appearance since 1954 FIFA World Cup. Sergen played a key role in qualification, scoring two goals. Sergen featured in two matches at the finals where they fell at the first hurdle, pointless and goalless. After the tournament, Sergen received several offers from the European shores, including the likes of West Ham United. Sergen's refusal to move was made by the fact the clubs in pursuit were not bigger than Beşiktaş.

==== 1998 World Cup ====
Sergen was fairly inactive in the national team during this period. In the opening round of 1998 FIFA World Cup qualification, Sergen came on as a second-half substitute against Belgium. Sergen went from hero to villain in the space of five minutes by contriving to get himself sent off after initially scoring a splendid half-volley on the edge of the box. Turkey went on to lose the match 2–1 at Brussels. Manager Mustafa Denizli saw Sergen as a liability and did not select him for the next 13 months. Sergen's only other match during qualification was the 5–0 victory at San Marino, and Sergen was hugely disappointing. Turkey failed to make the finals.

==== Euro 2000 ====
To his detractors, Sergen was a luxury item in a team which could ill afford luxuries. Those who had a fondness for decrying Sergen's abilities have suggested that, when playing at the highest level, he glitters rather than shines. So when Sergen was given a second chance, many lashed out at Denizli's decision to select him. Having finally accepted that he was the linchpin of his national side, Sergen dedicated himself to banish bitter memories of his past.

The opening match saw Sergen give a man of the match performance in a 3–0 victory over Northern Ireland, followed by a 1–0 victory against European champions Germany, but then shamefully defeated 1–3 to Finland. The next match against Moldova, Sergen was the maestro for the Turkish side, with his spectacular dribbling runs, shots at goal and his clairvoyant passes creating scoring chances for his teammates. It was from his corner kick that Turkey opened the scoring, and four minutes into injury time when Sergen took the stage, displacing the lead-footed Moldovan defenders one by one before slotting in a cracker from the edge of the area to give Turkey a 2–0 victory. Sergen also made history because his goal was the 400th scored in the history of the Turkey national team. Prior to the next match, Turkey had never defeated Finland in any official match since 1924. Outpaced and outplayed for 15 minutes, Turkey trailed 2–0 before Sergen intervened. The man of the match was involved in three goals as Turkey turned around a two-goal deficit to defeat Finland 2–4. Turkey gained five points from their final three matches to finish group runners-up. The final game with Germany ended 0–0, but is seen as one of the greatest individual displays in the history of the Turkey national team, as Sergen "pulled all the strings", according to the German manager Erich Ribbeck. As group runners-up, Turkey faced the Republic of Ireland in a play-off tie to qualify for Euro 2000. The Irish entered the match as favorites mainly due to their influential skipper, Roy Keane. In the first leg, Ireland could only do with a 1–1 draw in Dublin. Eamonn Sweeney of the Irish Examiner wrote the match report.

Sergen Yalçın may play Fenerbahçe, but his midfield display was an unscheduled replacement for the top of the bill showing we’d been expecting from the Manchester United man. At times, Keane looked like someone who arrived at the podium to pick up an MTV award only to see someone else making off with it. Yalcin, without ever moving faster than a jogger, was always one step ahead, showing the ball to Keane like a matador brandishing a cape and then whisking it away as his dangerous foe arrived. The Turkish midfielder's technical brilliance, was merely one of the intriguing factors about his team's oddly diverse performance. Paradoxically, you could see how they defeated Germany, but also how Finland had upset them at home.

The second leg ended 0–0, which was enough for Turkey to qualify through the away-goals rule. In the first 20 minutes of the second half alone, Sergen set up four clear scoring chances as he produced another man of the match performance.

Turkey opened their Euro 2000 campaign with a controversial 2–1 defeat to Italy. The Guardian writer Ian Ross recalled the game.

The bizarre interpretation of the shoulder-charge ruling by the Scottish referee Hugh Dallas may have presented Italy with the penalty that pushed Turkey to defeat in their opening Group B fixture, but Sergen's contribution was immense, an intoxicating cocktail of neatly threaded through-balls and passes so visionary they might have been delivered by Mystic Meg.

It was his assist from a nicely flighted free-kick from which Turkey scored. Surprisingly, Sergen then came on as a substitute in their 0–0 draw with Sweden, and he didn't feature at all during the 2–0 victory over Belgium. In the quarter-finals, Sergen came on in the final few minutes as Turkey were defeated by Portugal. Sergen heavily criticised Denizli for not starting him in all of the matches, "He's got problems, he's not all there in the head. Don't ask me why I didn't play, ask him."

==== 2002 World Cup ====
Sergen missed most of 2002 FIFA World Cup qualification due to his dismal performances at club level. His transfer to Galatasaray and performances in the UEFA Champions League allowed him back into the team and he featured in the 5–0 thrashing of Austria to qualify for the 2002 FIFA World Cup. Tragically though Sergen had injured himself prior to the tournament and did not feature.

==== Euro 2004 ====
Sergen again wasn't involved in most of the UEFA Euro 2004 qualification campaign, but due to his memorable performance against Chelsea, he was selected for the crucial final qualifying match against England. It was his final match for Turkey, which ended 0–0. Due to injury, he did not feature in the play-off ties against Latvia as Turkey were defeated.

== Managerial career ==
=== Early career ===
==== Managing multiple Turkish clubs ====
In October 2008, following the resignation of Beşiktaş’s head coach Ertuğrul Sağlam, Mustafa Denizli was appointed as the new head coach, and Yalçın was initially set to become his assistant. However, due to licensing issues, Yalçın was assigned to coach the under-15 team while completing a six-month internship to upgrade his coaching license. Despite this, he was more involved with the first team's technical staff.

In August 2009, Yalçın was placed in charge of the Beşiktaş A2 team, which performed strongly in the A2 League. However, he resigned in December 2009, citing head coach Mustafa Denizli’s lack of interest in youth development and reluctance to utilize young players.

During the 2013–14 season, Gaziantepspor struggled in the league, with 2 wins, 2 draws, and 7 losses in the first 11 weeks. After parting ways with Bülent Uygun, the club appointed Yalçın as their manager on 15 November 2013. Under his management, the team played 15 matches, achieving 8 wins, 3 draws, and 4 losses. On March 29, 2014, Yalçın mutually terminated his contract with the club. When Yalçın left, the team was in 10th place. Despite failing to win after his departure, Gaziantepspor managed to stay in the league.

On 23 December 2014 after Roberto Carlos left Sivasspor, Yalçın agreed to manage the team until the end of the season. In his first 18 matches, the team secured 7 wins, 4 draws, and 7 losses. On 15 May 2015 he extended his contract for another year with an option for further renewal. Sivasspor reached the semi-finals of the 2014–15 Turkish Cup and achieved their goal of avoiding relegation. On 24 October 2015 after a 2–0 defeat against Trabzonspor Yalçın announced he was considering resigning due to poor performance and subsequently mutually terminated his contract. During his tenure in the Süper Lig, Sivasspor played 29 matches under Yalçın, winning 7, drawing 11, and losing 11, scoring 40 goals while conceding 41.

On 11 January 2017, Yalçın was appointed as the manager of Kayserispor. On 22 April 2017, following a 2–1 away defeat to Gençlerbirliği Yalçın resigned from his position. During his time at the club, Yalçın managed 12 league matches, achieving 4 wins, 3 draws, and 5 losses. The team was in 15th place when he departed, following a seven-match unbeaten run and four consecutive defeats.

On 31 July 2017, Yalçın signed a one-year contract with Eskişehirspor, a team competing in the TFF 1. Lig and under a transfer ban. On 25 September 2017, after failing to secure a win in the first five league matches and with the team sitting in 17th place with just 3 points, Yalçın resigned.

On 6 March 2018, Yalçın signed with Konyaspor until the end of the 2017–18 season. Taking over when the team was in the relegation zone, Konyaspor won 4, drew 3, and lost 3 of their last 10 matches, finishing in 15th place and avoiding relegation. On 20 June 2018, Konyaspor announced Yalçın and his staff had parted ways with the club.

On 9 November 2018, Yalçın was appointed as the manager of Alanyaspor. At the end of the 2018–19 season, his contract expired, and he decided not to renew it.

On 13 June 2019, Yalçın signed a one-year contract with Yeni Malatyaspor. On 16 January 2020 his contract was terminated in January 2020 following a loss to Sivasspor. During his six-month tenure, Yalçın oversaw 17 league matches, achieving 6 wins, 6 draws, and 5 losses, with the team finishing the first half of the season in 8th place. In the 2019–20 UEFA Europa League, the team recorded 2 wins, 1 draw, and 1 loss.

=== Beşiktaş ===
==== 2019–20 season ====
On 29 January 2020, Yalçın was appointed as the head coach of Beşiktaş, replacing Abdullah Avcı with a 1.5-year contract. His return to the club where he was a legendary player was marked by a massive signing ceremony at Vodafone Park, attended by approximately 21,000 supporters. Yalçın's managerial debut occurred on 1 February 2020, resulting in a 2–1 away victory against Çaykur Rizespor. Under his guidance, the team underwent a significant resurgence; taking over a side positioned 7th in the Süper Lig, Yalçın managed 15 league matches, recording 10 wins, 2 draws, and 3 losses. This run propelled Beşiktaş to a 3rd-place finish with 62 points. Due to a UEFA ban imposed on runners-up Trabzonspor, Beşiktaş subsequently earned a spot in the 2020–21 UEFA Champions League qualifying rounds.

==== 2020–21 season: The Domestic Double ====
The 2020–21 campaign began with continental disappointment as Beşiktaş was eliminated from the Champions League by PAOK (3–1) and subsequently from the UEFA Europa League by Rio Ave on penalties. Despite these setbacks and a slow start in the domestic league, Yalçın orchestrated a historic season. Beşiktaş clinched the 2020–21 Süper Lig title in one of the closest finishes in Turkish football history. On the final matchday, a 2–1 win over Göztepe allowed Beşiktaş to finish level on 84 points with Galatasaray, securing the championship solely on a superior goal difference of a single goal (+45 to +44).

Three days after the league triumph, Yalçın led the team to a 2–0 victory over Antalyaspor in the 2020–21 Turkish Cup final, completing the club's first domestic double since the 2008–09 season. Key performers during this tenure included Rachid Ghezzal, who led the league in assists, and Cyle Larin, the team's top scorer.

==== 2021–22 season and resignation ====
Following prolonged contract negotiations during the summer of 2021, Yalçın signed a new one-year deal. However, the 2021–22 season was characterized by a sharp decline in performance. In the 2021–22 UEFA Champions League group stage, Beşiktaş suffered six consecutive defeats against Borussia Dortmund, Ajax, and Sporting CP, finishing last in Group C with zero points and a -16 goal difference—the worst performance by a Turkish club in the competition's history. Domestic form also faltered, with the team enduring a five-match winless streak in the Süper Lig. On 9 December 2021, following a 5–0 loss to Dortmund, Yalçın officially resigned from his position. He left the club having managed 79 games, maintaining an average of 1.84 points per match.

=== Antalyaspor ===
On 2 January 2024, Yalçın was appointed as the head coach of Antalyaspor, succeeding Nuri Şahin. He signed a short-term contract until the end of the 2023–24 season. During his tenure, he led the team to a mid-table finish, recording 7 wins and 6 draws across 23 matches. On 6 May 2024, following a defeat to Pendikspor, Yalçın announced that he would leave the club at the end of the season, citing a lack of alignment between his personal goals and those of the club's board.

=== Return to Beşiktaş ===
Following the dismissal of Ole Gunnar Solskjær due to poor results in European competitions, Yalçın returned to Beşiktaş for a second managerial stint on August 30, 2025. He signed a contract extending through the end of the 2026–27 season. His return was marked by a 2–0 loss to Alanyaspor in his opening match. By early 2026, Yalçın had guided Beşiktaş to the knockout stages of the Turkish Cup, including a notable 2–1 group stage victory over rivals Fenerbahçe. They progressed to the quarter-finals, where they beat Alanyaspor 3–0 on 23 April 2026. Nonetheless, Beşiktaş was knocked out of the Turkish Cup on 5 May 2026 when they lost 1–0 to Konyaspor. Even though the game was level during the majority of the extra time period, Konyaspor got a penalty from the video assistant referee, which was awarded due to fouling within the box.

While Yalçın stabilized the team against the rest of the league, Beşiktaş struggled with the high-intensity finishing of the top two. Of the four derbies, Beşiktaş could not score a goal twice and won just 1 point out of 12 possible points in league derbies, one of the worst results for the club in recent years, ending the 2025–26 Süper Lig season without securing a derby victory for the first time in 41 years, since the 1984–85 season.

In the first half of the Süper Lig season, Beşiktaş managed a 1–1 draw away from home against Galatasaray on 4 October 2025 but suffered a 3–2 home defeat to Fenerbahçe on 2 November 2025, a game in which Orkun Kökçü received his marching orders after 26 minutes. The difficulties against their title competitors extended to the second half of the season, as well, when Beşiktaş suffered a 1–0 home defeat to Galatasaray on 7 March 2026 and a 1–0 defeat away from home to Fenerbahçe on 5 April 2026, where Kerem Aktürkoğlu scored a 90th-minute penalty.

The club's fixtures against rivals Trabzonspor also proved difficult. On 14 December 2025, Beşiktaş played out a 3–3 draw at Papara Park despite being ten men in the first half. In the return fixture on 9 May 2026, Beşiktaş suffered a 2–1 home defeat, with former Beşiktaş player Ernest Muçi scoring the winning goal for the visitors.

Following a meeting with Serdal Adalı on 18 May 2026, Yalçın's contract was terminated under mutual consent Beşiktaş alongside Football A Team General Coordinator Serkan Reçber.

== Personal life ==
Yalçın is the first child of Günsel and Özer Yalçın. He grew up with two younger brothers, Gürsoy and Volkan. Sergen discovered his passion for football as a child, playing on the beaches of Kilyos. His father, Özer Yalçın, a former footballer, recognized his talent early and took him to Beşiktaş for tryouts, entrusting him to Serpil Hamdi Tüzün. Despite working at a hotel at the time, Özer supported his son's training until Sergen became independent as he started secondary school.

Originally from Rize, Yalçın was a footballer who attracted a great deal of attention for his private life as much as his football career. Sergen's passion for horse racing often caused problems at the clubs he played for. His teammate Gökhan Keskin shared in an interview: "When he first came to Beşiktaş, they put him with me. He was only 17. They said, 'Look after this boy, he’s into horse racing.' Two weeks later, I found myself, Metin, and Sergen making horse racing bets together." At one point, his name came up during the "Barbie Operation," a prostitution investigation, where he had to testify. He was also investigated due to his gambling addiction and alleged connections with Sedat Peker. On an NTV program, Sergen admitted that Bayern Munich had considered signing him but decided against it after learning about these traits.

Sergen also played in Acun Ilıcalı's football tournament "Devler Ligi," which featured former football stars. He appeared in an online advertisement for Yeni Rakı and starred in commercials for the European company. Most recently, he acted in advertisements for Finans Bank's EnPara brand.

Additionally, Sergen Yalçın served as a jury member for two seasons (2011–2012 and 2012–2013) on the Turkish talent show Yetenek Sizsiniz. He also took on a leading role in the TV series "Sil Baştan," produced by Tükenmezkalem Film and directed by Gani Müjde, alongside Emre Kınay, Dilara Gönder, Esra Dermancıoğlu, Belma Canciğer, and Murat Dalkılıç. In this 2014 series, he played himself.

Before the matches of the first week of the 2020–21 Süper Lig season, Sergen Yalçın tested positive for COVID-19.

== Career statistics ==
=== Club ===
Appearances and goals by club, season, and competition
| Club | Season | League | | | Cup | | Europe | | Total | |
| Club | Season | Division | Apps | Goals | Apps | Goals | Apps | Goals | Apps | Goals |
|---|---|---|---|---|---|---|---|---|---|---|
| Beşiktaş | 1991–92 | Süper Lig | 15 | 2 | 2 | 0 | 1 | 0 | 18 | 2 |
| Beşiktaş | 1992–93 | Süper Lig | 23 | 8 | 5 | 0 | 1 | 0 | 29 | 8 |
| Beşiktaş | 1993–94 | Süper Lig | 20 | 6 | 3 | 1 | 4 | 1 | 27 | 8 |
| Beşiktaş | 1994–95 | Süper Lig | 27 | 8 | 2 | 0 | 3 | 0 | 32 | 8 |
| Beşiktaş | 1995–96 | Süper Lig | 24 | 10 | 3 | 1 | 2 | 0 | 29 | 11 |
| Beşiktaş | 1996–97 | Süper Lig | 29 | 9 | 5 | 1 | 4 | 0 | 38 | 10 |
| Beşiktaş | Total | | 138 | 43 | 20 | 3 | 15 | 1 | 173 | 47 |
| İstanbulspor | 1997–98 | Süper Lig | 28 | 10 | 4 | 1 | 5 | 2 | 37 | 13 |
| İstanbulspor | 1998–99 | Süper Lig | 8 | 4 | – | | 2 | 1 | 10 | 5 |
| İstanbulspor | Total | | 36 | 14 | 4 | 1 | 7 | 3 | 47 | 18 |
| Fenerbahçe (loan) | 1998–99 | Süper Lig | 15 | 7 | – | | – | | 15 | 7 |
| Fenerbahçe (loan) | 1999–00 | Süper Lig | 9 | 1 | – | | 2 | 0 | 11 | 1 |
| Fenerbahçe (loan) | Total | | 24 | 8 | – | | 2 | 0 | 26 | 8 |
| Galatasaray (loan) | 1999–00 | Süper Lig | 18 | 4 | 3 | 2 | – | | 21 | 6 |
| Trabzonspor (loan) | 2000–01 | Süper Lig | 21 | 1 | – | | – | | 21 | 1 |
| Galatasaray (loan) | 2001–02 | Süper Lig | 18 | 7 | – | | 9 | 2 | 27 | 9 |
| Beşiktaş | 2002–03 | Süper Lig | 28 | 11 | 1 | 0 | 9 | 1 | 38 | 12 |
| Beşiktaş | 2003–04 | Süper Lig | 24 | 8 | 1 | 0 | 8 | 2 | 33 | 10 |
| Beşiktaş | 2004–05 | Süper Lig | 22 | 3 | – | | 5 | 0 | 27 | 3 |
| Beşiktaş | 2005–06 | Süper Lig | 18 | 6 | 6 | 2 | 5 | 0 | 29 | 8 |
| Beşiktaş | Total | | 92 | 28 | 8 | 2 | 27 | 3 | 127 | 33 |
| Şekerspor | 2006–07 | 2. Lig | 22 | 13 | 1 | 0 | – | | 23 | 13 |
| Eskişehirspor | 2007–08 | 1. Lig | 21 | 6 | – | | – | | 21 | 6 |
| Career total | | | 390 | 124 | 36 | 8 | 60 | 9 | 486 | 141 |

=== International ===
Appearances and goals by national team and year
| National team | Year | Apps | Goals |
|---|---|---|---|
| Turkey | 1994 | 3 | 1 |
| Turkey | 1995 | 8 | 2 |
| Turkey | 1996 | 11 | 1 |
| Turkey | 1997 | 7 | 0 |
| Turkey | 1998 | 5 | 0 |
| Turkey | 1999 | 3 | 1 |
| Turkey | 2001 | 2 | 0 |
| Turkey | 2003 | 1 | 0 |
| Turkey | Total | 37 | 5 |

Scores and results list Turkey's goal tally first, score column indicates score after each Yalçın goal.

List of international goals scored by Sergen Yalçın
| No. | Date | Venue | Opponent | Score | Result | Competition |
|---|---|---|---|---|---|---|
| 1 | 12 October 1994 | Istanbul, Turkey | Iceland | 5–0 | 5–0 | UEFA Euro 1996 qualification |
| 2 | 29 March 1995 | Istanbul, Turkey | Sweden | 2–1 | 2–1 | UEFA Euro 1996 qualification |
| 3 | 7 June 1995 | Montreal, Canada | Canada | 1–0 | 3–0 | Friendly |
| 4 | 31 August 1996 | Brussels, Belgium | Belgium | 1–2 | 1–2 | 1998 FIFA World Cup qualification |
| 5 | 27 March 1999 | Istanbul, Turkey | Moldova | 2–0 | 2–0 | UEFA Euro 2000 qualification |

=== Managerial statistics ===
As of match updated 15 November 2026

| Team | From | To | Record | | | | |
| Team | From | To | G | W | D | L | Win % |
|---|---|---|---|---|---|---|---|
| Gaziantepspor | 19 November 2013 | 25 March 2014 | 16 | 8 | 3 | 5 | 50.00 |
| Sivasspor | 23 December 2014 | 26 October 2015 | 38 | 14 | 12 | 12 | 36.84 |
| Gaziantepspor | 5 May 2016 | 30 June 2016 | 3 | 1 | 1 | 1 | 33.33 |
| Kayserispor | 11 January 2017 | 22 April 2017 | 17 | 5 | 5 | 7 | 29.41 |
| Eskişehirspor | 31 July 2017 | 25 September 2017 | 6 | 0 | 3 | 3 | 0.00 |
| Konyaspor | 6 March 2018 | 30 June 2018 | 10 | 4 | 3 | 3 | 40.00 |
| Alanyaspor | 12 November 2018 | 30 June 2019 | 24 | 8 | 8 | 8 | 33.33 |
| Yeni Malatyaspor | 1 July 2019 | 15 January 2020 | 21 | 9 | 5 | 7 | 42.86 |
| Beşiktaş | 29 January 2020 | 9 December 2021 | 79 | 45 | 10 | 24 | 56.96 |
| Antalyaspor | 3 January 2024 | 30 June 2024 | 23 | 7 | 7 | 9 | 30.43 |
| Beşiktaş | 30 August 2025 | 18 May 2026 | 39 | 20 | 10 | 9 | 51.28 |
| Turkey | 20 October 2026 | Present | 2 | 0 | 0 | 2 | 0.00 |
| Total | | | 278 | 121 | 67 | 90 | 43.53 |

== Honours ==
=== Player ===
Beşiktaş

- Süper Lig: 1991–92, 1994–95, 2002–03
- Turkish Cup: 1993–94, 2005–06
- Turkish Super Cup: 1992, 1994
- Prime Minister's Cup: 1997
- TSYD Cup: 1993, 1996

Galatasaray

- Süper Lig: 1999–2000, 2001–02
- Turkish Cup: 1999–2000

Turkey U-21

- Mediterranean Games: 1993

=== Manager ===
Beşiktaş

- Süper Lig: 2020–21
- Turkish Cup: 2020–21

=== Individual ===
Player

- Süper Lig top assist provider: 2000 (14 assists)
- Beşiktaş silver 11 of the century: 2003
- Milliyet Sports Awards Player of the Year in Turkey: 2003
- Eminönü Belediyesi Century Footballer award: 2003

Manager

- Coach of the team that scored 5 goals in the first half of a match in the Süper Lig in Beşiktaş history.
- He became the first name to become a champion in the Süper Lig as a football player and coach in Beşiktaş.
- Coach of the team that scored the most goals in the Süper Lig in the history of Beşiktaş. (89 goal)
