= Bülent Uzun =

Turkish footballer (born 1990)

Personal information
- Date of birth: 21 November 1990 (age 35)
- Place of birth: Rize, Turkey
- Height: 1.74 m (5 ft 9 in)
- Position: Left-back

Team information
- Current team: Kahramanmaraş İstiklalspor
- Number: 53

Youth career
- 2003–2007: Beşiktaş

Senior career*
| Years | Team | Apps | (Gls) |
| 2007–2010 | Beşiktaş | 1 | (0) |
| 2008–2009 | → Kasımpaşa (loan) | 5 | (0) |
| 2010 | → Kocaelispor (loan) | 4 | (0) |
| 2010–2011 | Eyüpspor | 6 | (0) |
| 2011–2013 | Kasımpaşa | 0 | (0) |
| 2011–2012 | → Yeni Malatyaspor (loan) | 15 | (0) |
| 2012–2013 | Aydınspor 1923 | 10 | (0) |
| 2013 | Maltepespor | 41 | (2) |
| 2014–2015 | Darıca Gençlerbirliği | 29 | (0) |
| 2015–2020 | Tuzlaspor | 145 | (2) |
| 2020–2023 | Eyüpspor | 60 | (2) |
| 2023–2025 | Sakaryaspor | 72 | (1) |
| 2025– | Kahramanmaraş İstiklalspor | 7 | (0) |

International career^{‡}
| 2005 | Turkey U15 | 5 | (0) |
| 2004–2006 | Turkey U16 | 16 | (0) |
| 2006 | Turkey U17 | 1 | (0) |
| 2007–2008 | Turkey U18 | 8 | (0) |
| 2008 | Turkey U19 | 2 | (0) |
- * Club domestic league appearances and goals as of 30 November 2025 ‡ National team caps and goals as of 6 March 2016

Bülent Uzun (born 21 November 1990) is a Turkish professional footballer who plays as a left-back for TFF 2. Lig club Kahramanmaraş İstiklalspor. He is not to be confused with Turkish football referee Bülent Uzun.

== Career ==
Uzun played between 2003 and 2008 as a part of Beşiktaş PAF, the youth section of Beşiktaş, until he was promoted to senior team by head coach Jean Tigana. Uzun made his Süper Lig debut at match-week 19 of 2007–08 season up against Kasımpaşa, as a subbed in player in loss time, on 19 January 2008. In the following weeks, he rather stayed in the bench.
