= List of Turkish football transfers summer 2009 =

This is a list of Turkish football transfers for the 2009 summer transfer window by club. Only transfers of clubs in the Süper Lig are included.

== Süper Lig 2009–10 ==
=== Ankaragücü ===
In: Note: Flags indicate national team as defined under FIFA eligibility rules; some limited exceptions apply. Players may hold more than one non-FIFA nationality.

No.	Pos.	Nation	Player
4	DF	TUR	Koray Çölgeçen (from Kayserispor)
5	DF	TUR	Ediz Bahtiyaroğlu (from Ankaraspor)
9	FW	ENG	Ian Henderson (from (England) Luton Town F.C.)
13	FW	ENG	Darius Vassell (from (England) Manchester City F.C.)
29	DF	BRA	Diego Padilha (from (Brazil) AD Sao Caetano)
30	FW	TUR	Emre Aygün (from Akçaabat Sebatspor)
38	MF	TUR	Suat Baş (from (Germany) Arminia Bielefeld II)
46	MF	TUR	Cihan Haspolatlı (from Konyaspor)
99	FW	CMR	Gustave Bebbe (from İstanbul BB)
-	DF	ARG	Ariel Broggi (on loan from (Argentina) CA Banfield)
-	DF	SWE	Lars Fredrik Risp (from Ankaraspor)
-	DF	TUR	Muhammet Hanifi Yoldas (from Ankaraspor)
-	MF	TUR	Hürriyet Güçer (from Ankaraspor)
-	MF	TUR	Mehmet Çakır (from Ankaraspor)
-	MF	TUR	Faruk Bayar (from Sivasspor)
-	MF	TUR	Mustafa Er (from Konyaspor)

Out: Note: Flags indicate national team as defined under FIFA eligibility rules; some limited exceptions apply. Players may hold more than one non-FIFA nationality.

No.	Pos.	Nation	Player
3	DF	TUR	İhsan Burak Özsaraç (to Manisaspor)
85	FW	BRA	Jaba (to (Azerbaijan) FK Baku)
-	MF	TUR	İbrahim Ege (to Diyarbakırspor)
-	MF	TUR	Burak Karaduman (to Karşıyaka S.K.)
-	MF	TUR	Güney Atılgan (to Karşıyaka S.K.)
-	MF	TUR	Hasan Üçüncü (to Giresunspor)
-	FW	TUR	Mehmet Yılmaz (to Eskişehirspor)
-	DF	TUR	Mustafa Aydın (to Karşıyaka S.K.)
-	MF	TUR	Onur Acar (to Adanaspor)
-	DF	TUR	Özgür Bayer (to Giresunspor)
-	DF	ALG	Ismaël Bouzid (to (Scotland) Heart of Midlothian)

=== Ankaraspor ===
In: Note: Flags indicate national team as defined under FIFA eligibility rules; some limited exceptions apply. Players may hold more than one non-FIFA nationality.

No.	Pos.	Nation	Player
3	DF	CZE	Erich Brabec (from (Czech Republic) Slavia Prague)
17	FW	TUR	İlhan Parlak (from Fenerbahçe)
20	MF	TUR	Aydın Karabulut (from Beşiktaş)
22	GK	TUR	Gökhan Tokgöz (from Kayseri Erciyesspor)
60	MF	TUR	Özgür Çek (from Fenerbahçe)

Out: Note: Flags indicate national team as defined under FIFA eligibility rules; some limited exceptions apply. Players may hold more than one non-FIFA nationality.

No.	Pos.	Nation	Player
-	MF	TUR	Özer Hurmacı (to Fenerbahçe)
-	DF	MNE	Radoslav Batak (to Antalyaspor)
-	DF	TUR	Erhan Güven (to Beşiktaş)
-	DF	TUR	Murat Akyüz (to Kocaelispor)
-	GK	TUR	Ramazan Kurşunlu (to Karşıyaka S.K.)
-	MF	LBR	Tonia Tisdell (loan to Karşıyaka S.K.)
-	DF	TUR	Ediz Bahtiyaroğlu (to MKE Ankaragücü)
-	DF	SWE	Lars Fredrik Risp (to MKE Ankaragücü)
-	DF	TUR	Muhammet Hanifi Yoldas (to MKE Ankaragücü)
-	MF	TUR	Hürriyet Güçer (to MKE Ankaragücü)
-	MF	TUR	Mehmet Çakır (to MKE Ankaragücü)

=== Antalyaspor ===
In: Note: Flags indicate national team as defined under FIFA eligibility rules; some limited exceptions apply. Players may hold more than one non-FIFA nationality.

No.	Pos.	Nation	Player
7	FW	ISR	Pini Balili (from Sivasspor)
17	MF	TUR	Kerim Zengin (from İstanbul BB)
21	MF	AUS	Mile Jedinak (on loan from Gençlerbirliği)
32	MF	TUR	Gürhan Gürsoy (from Fenerbahçe)
50	FW	TUR	Veysel Cihan (from Konyaspor)
77	DF	MNE	Radoslav Batak (from Ankaraspor)
-	FW	TUR	Necati Ateş (from Galatasaray)
-	GK	TUR	Hasan Sönmez (from Samsunspor)

Out: Note: Flags indicate national team as defined under FIFA eligibility rules; some limited exceptions apply. Players may hold more than one non-FIFA nationality.

No.	Pos.	Nation	Player
-	MF	TUR	Abdullah Çetin (to MKE Ankaragücü)
-	DF	TUR	Uğur Kavuk (to Sivasspor)
-	FW	TUR	Mustafa Özkan (to Diyarbakırspor)
-	FW	TUR	Timur Kosovalı (to Gençlerbirliği)
-	GK	TUR	Fevzi Elmas (to Orduspor)
-	MF	TUR	Volkan Arslan (to free agent)
-	MF	TUR	Kamber Arslan (to free agent)

=== Beşiktaş ===
In: Note: Flags indicate national team as defined under FIFA eligibility rules; some limited exceptions apply. Players may hold more than one non-FIFA nationality.

No.	Pos.	Nation	Player
3	DF	TUR	İsmail Köybaşı (from Gaziantepspor)
4	DF	TUR	İbrahim Kaş (on loan from (Spain) Getafe CF)
5	MF	GER	Michael Fink (from (Germany) Eintracht Frankfurt)
7	DF	TUR	Rıdvan Şimşek (from Karşıyaka S.K.)
8	FW	TUR	Nihat Kahveci (from (Spain) Villereal)
9	FW	TUR	Batuhan Karadeniz (loan return from Eskişehirspor)
15	MF	BRA	Rodrigo Tabata (from Gaziantepspor)
26	MF	TUR	Onur Bayramoğlu (from Bozüyükspor)
27	DF	ITA	Matteo Ferrari (from (Italy) Genoa C.F.C.)
44	DF	TUR	Erhan Güven (from Ankaraspor)

Out: Note: Flags indicate national team as defined under FIFA eligibility rules; some limited exceptions apply. Players may hold more than one non-FIFA nationality.

No.	Pos.	Nation	Player
2	DF	TUR	Serdar Kurtuluş (to Gaziantepspor)
4	MF	FRA	Edouard Cisse (to (France) Olympique Marseille)
5	DF	TUR	Gökhan Zan (to Galatasaray)
20	MF	TUR	Aydın Karabulut (to Ankaraspor)
-	DF	CRO	Gordon Schildenfeld (loan to (Austria) Sturm Graz)
-	DF	CZE	Tomas Zapotocny (loan to Bursaspor)
-	GK	TUR	Erdem Köse (to Giresunspor)
-	DF	TUR	Sezer Sezgin (to Gaziantepspor)
-	FW	TUR	Kenan Özer (to Çaykur Rizespor)
-	MF	TUR	Mehmet Sedef (loan to Çaykur Rizespor)
-	DF	TUR	Bülent Uzun (loan to Kocaelispor)
-	DF	TUR	Emre Özkan (loan to Orduspor)

=== Bursaspor ===
In: Note: Flags indicate national team as defined under FIFA eligibility rules; some limited exceptions apply. Players may hold more than one non-FIFA nationality.

No.	Pos.	Nation	Player
5	MF	TUR	Hüseyin Cimşir (from Trabzonspor)
17	MF	ARG	Pablo Batalla (from (Argentina) CA Velez)
22	MF	TUR	Turgay Bahadır (from Kayserispor)
25	MF	SRB	Ivan Ergic (from (Switzerland) FC Basel)
26	DF	CZE	Tomáš Zápotočný (from Beşiktaş)
-	DF	TUR	Ramazan Sal (from Pendikspor)
19	FW	TUR	Isa Bağcı (from (Scotland) Rangers F.C. Youth team)

Out: Note: Flags indicate national team as defined under FIFA eligibility rules; some limited exceptions apply. Players may hold more than one non-FIFA nationality.

No.	Pos.	Nation	Player
15	DF	TUR	Mustafa Sarp (to Galatasaray)
-	MF	BLR	Maxim Romaschenko (to (Russia) FC Khimki)
-	FW	TUR	Gökhan Güleç (to Kasımpaşa S.K.)
-	MF	TUR	Kemal Aslan (to Çaykur Rizespor)
-	DF	TUR	Volkan Kürşat Bekiroğlu (to Giresunspor)

=== Denizlispor ===
In: Note: Flags indicate national team as defined under FIFA eligibility rules; some limited exceptions apply. Players may hold more than one non-FIFA nationality.

No.	Pos.	Nation	Player
2	DF	SWE	David Durmaz (from (Sweden) Malmö FF)
3	MF	TUR	Fahri Tatan (from Konyaspor)
4	DF	BIH	Branimir Bajić (from (Germany) TuS Koblenz)
6	DF	TUR	Ahmet Burak Solakel (from Karşıyaka S.K.)
7	FW	TUR	Murat Hacıoğlu (from Kocaelispor)
12	FW	TUR	Adem Çalık (from Kocaelispor)
19	FW	FRA	Norman Sylla (from (Belgium) FCV Dender EH)
24	GK	TUR	İsmail Şahmalı (from Denizli Belediyespor)
25	DF	BEN	Damien Chrysostome (from (France) FC Metz)
60	MF	TUR	Ahmet Cebe (from (Germany) Fortuna Düsseldorf)
-	DF	TUR	Mehmet Çoğum (from Konyaspor)

Out: Note: Flags indicate national team as defined under FIFA eligibility rules; some limited exceptions apply. Players may hold more than one non-FIFA nationality.

No.	Pos.	Nation	Player
-	DF	BRA	Wescley (free agent)
-	DF	BRA	Carlos Alberto (free agent)
-	DF	BRA	Irineu (free agent)
-	MF	TUR	Şener Aşkaroğlu (to Diyarbakırspor)
-	MF	TUR	Musa Sinan Yılmazer (to Altay S.K.)

=== Diyarbakırspor ===
In: Note: Flags indicate national team as defined under FIFA eligibility rules; some limited exceptions apply. Players may hold more than one non-FIFA nationality.

No.	Pos.	Nation	Player
1	GK	ECU	Rorys Aragon (from (Belgium) Standard Liège)
2	DF	EGY	Amir Azmy (from (Egypt) Zamalek SC)
3	DF	IRQ	Bassim Abbas (from (Iraq) Al-Talaba)
4	DF	TUR	Tolga Doğantez (from Manisaspor)
6	MF	TUR	Abdullah Çetin (from MKE Ankaragücü)
7	FW	TUR	Eren Şen (from Konyaspor)
8	MF	TUR	Erdal Güneş (from Altay S.K.)
9	FW	CMR	Thierry Tazemeta (from (Israel) Maccabi Netanya)
10	FW	TUR	Erhan Şentürk (from Galatasaray S.K.)
12	MF	EGY	Ayman Abdelaziz (from (Egypt) Zamalek SC)
16	DF	DEN	Mikkel Rask (from (Denmark) Viborg FF)
18	FW	PER	Andrés Mendoza (from (Mexico) Monarcas Morelia)
20	MF	TUR	Hakan Güler (from Muğlaspor)
22	FW	TUR	Mustafa Özkan (from Antalyaspor)
25	DF	GUI	Mamadou Alimou Diallo (from Sivasspor)
30	DF	TUR	Musa Büyük (from Kocaelispor)
32	DF	TUR	Erdinç Yavuz (from Kayseri Erciyesspor)
38	MF	TUR	Burak Karaduman (from Karşıyaka S.K.)
43	MF	TUR	Şener Aşkaroğlu (from Denizlispor)
55	DF	TUR	Adnan Güngör (from Hacettepe S.K.)
63	FW	TUR	İbrahim Ülüm (from Sivasspor)
99	MF	CMR	Joseph-Désiré Job (from (Qatar) Al-Kharitiyath)
-	MF	TUR	İbrahim Ege (from MKE Ankaragücü)
-	DF	TUR	Ümit Bozkurt (from Hacettepe Spor Kulübü)

Out: Note: Flags indicate national team as defined under FIFA eligibility rules; some limited exceptions apply. Players may hold more than one non-FIFA nationality.

No.	Pos.	Nation	Player

=== Eskişehirspor ===
In: Note: Flags indicate national team as defined under FIFA eligibility rules; some limited exceptions apply. Players may hold more than one non-FIFA nationality.

No.	Pos.	Nation	Player
6	MF	TUR	Veysel Sarı (from Beylerbeyi SK)
8	MF	TUR	Ragıp Başdağ (from Kayserispor)
10	FW	TUR	Mehmet Yılmaz (from Ankaragücü)
17	FW	TUR	Burak Yılmaz (from Fenerbahçe)
58	MF	TUR	Adem Sari (from (Germany) SC Pfullendorf)
74	DF	TUR	Volkan Yaman (from Galatasaray)
99	FW	TUR	Ümit Karan (from Galatasaray)

Out: Note: Flags indicate national team as defined under FIFA eligibility rules; some limited exceptions apply. Players may hold more than one non-FIFA nationality.

No.	Pos.	Nation	Player
-	FW	BRA	Anderson (to (South Korea) FC Seoul)
-	FW	CRO	Krunoslav Lovrek (free agent)
-	GK	TUR	Sinan Ören (on loan to Göztepe A.Ş.)
-	DF	TUR	Ahmet Sağlam (on loan to Göztepe A.Ş.)
-	DF	TUR	Tayfun Türkmen (to Konyaspor)

=== Fenerbahçe ===
In: Note: Flags indicate national team as defined under FIFA eligibility rules; some limited exceptions apply. Players may hold more than one non-FIFA nationality.

No.	Pos.	Nation	Player
15	DF	TUR	Bekir İrtegün (from Gaziantepspor)
16	MF	BRA	Cristian (from Corinthians)
20	MF	TUR	Özer Hurmacı (from Ankaraspor)
27	MF	BRA	André Santos (from Corinthians)
58	DF	BRA	Bilica (from Sivasspor)
66	MF	TUR	Mehmet Topuz (from Kayserispor)

Out: Note: Flags indicate national team as defined under FIFA eligibility rules; some limited exceptions apply. Players may hold more than one non-FIFA nationality.

No.	Pos.	Nation	Player
7	FW	TUR	Burak Yılmaz (to Eskişehirspor)
17	DF	TUR	Can Arat (to İstanbul BB)
20	MF	TUR	Gökhan Emreciksin (to Kayserispor)
25	MF	ESP	Josico (to (Spain) UD Las Palmas)
32	MF	TUR	Gürhan Gürsoy (to Antalyaspor)
33	MF	CHI	Claudio Maldonado (to Flamengo)
38	FW	TUR	Ilhan Parlak (to Ankaraspor)
53	DF	TUR	Yasin Çakmak (to Sivasspor)
67	MF	TUR	Özgur Çek (to Ankaraspor)
-	MF	BRA	Edu Dracena (free agent)

=== Galatasaray ===
In: Note: Flags indicate national team as defined under FIFA eligibility rules; some limited exceptions apply. Players may hold more than one non-FIFA nationality.

No.	Pos.	Nation	Player
5	DF	TUR	Gökhan Zan (from Beşiktaş)
9	MF	BRA	Elano (from (England) Manchester City F.C.)
11	MF	CIV	Abdul Kader Keïta (from (France) Olympique Lyonnais)
16	MF	TUR	Mustafa Sarp (from Bursaspor)
25	GK	ARG	Leo Franco (from (Spain) Atlético Madrid)
86	GK	TUR	Ufuk Ceylan (from Manisaspor)
88	DF	TUR	Caner Erkin (on loan from (Russia) CSKA Moscow)

Out: Note: Flags indicate national team as defined under FIFA eligibility rules; some limited exceptions apply. Players may hold more than one non-FIFA nationality.

No.	Pos.	Nation	Player
11	MF	TUR	Hasan Şaş (retired)
17	FW	TUR	Yaser Yıldız (to Manisaspor)
26	GK	ITA	Morgan De Sanctis (to (Italy) S.S.C. Napoli)
34	FW	TUR	Erhan Şentürk (to Diyarbakırspor)
35	MF	TUR	Ferdi Elmas (released)
54	GK	TUR	Orkun Usak (to Manisaspor)
74	DF	TUR	Volkan Yaman (to Eskişehirspor)
87	MF	TUR	Mehmet Güven (to Manisaspor)
99	FW	TUR	Ümit Karan (to Eskişehirspor)
-	FW	TUR	Necati Ateş (to Antalyaspor)
-	DF	TUR	Anıl Karaer (to Adanaspor)
-	MF	TUR	Gökhan Öztürk (to Gaziantepspor)
-	DF	TUR	Erkan Ferin (to Trabzon Karadenizspor)
-	MF	TUR	Zafer Sakar (to Boluspor)
-	MF	TUR	Irfan Basaran (to Orduspor)
-	FW	TUR	Mehmet Duz (to Mersin İdman Yurdu)

=== Gaziantepspor ===
In: Note: Flags indicate national team as defined under FIFA eligibility rules; some limited exceptions apply. Players may hold more than one non-FIFA nationality.

No.	Pos.	Nation	Player
16	DF	TUR	Serdar Kurtuluş (from Beşiktaş)
20	MF	TUR	Gökhan Öztürk (from Galatasaray)
23	GK	TUR	Recep Biler (from Hacettepe S.K.)
28	DF	TUR	Tolga Seyhan (from Hacettepe S.K.)
61	FW	TUR	Ümit Tütünci (from Gençlerbirliği)
99	FW	BRA	Júlio César (from (Romania) FC Rapid București)
-	FW	AUT	Roland Linz (from (Portugal) SC Braga)
-	FW	BRA	Jorginho (from (Portugal) SC Braga)
-	FW	TUR	Ertan Koç (from Sarıyer G.K.)
-	FW	TUR	Gökhan Ünver (from Sarıyer G.K.)
-	DF	TUR	Caner Bulut (from Hatayspor)

Out: Note: Flags indicate national team as defined under FIFA eligibility rules; some limited exceptions apply. Players may hold more than one non-FIFA nationality.

No.	Pos.	Nation	Player
-	DF	TUR	İsmail Köybaşı (to Beşiktaş)
-	DF	TUR	Bekir İrtegün (to Fenerbahçe)
-	FW	BRA	Eduardo Pacheco (free agent)
-	MF	BRA	Rodrigo Tabata (to Beşiktaş)
-	FW	TUR	Ertan Koç (on loan to Gaziantep B.B.K.)
-	FW	TUR	Gökhan Ünver (on loan to Gaziantep B.B.K.)

=== Gençlerbirliği ===
In: Note: Flags indicate national team as defined under FIFA eligibility rules; some limited exceptions apply. Players may hold more than one non-FIFA nationality.

No.	Pos.	Nation	Player
1	GK	TUR	Serdar Kulbilge (from Kocaelispor)
8	MF	SWE	Labinot Harbuzi (from (Sweden) Malmö FF)
9	MF	BRA	Tozo da Silva (from Hacettepe S.K)
10	MF	BRA	Sandro Mendonça (from Hacettepe S.K)
15	FW	TUR	Sinan Ayrancı (from (Sweden) IF Brommapojkarna)
16	FW	COD	Patiyo Tambwe (from Hacettepe S.K.)
28	DF	BIH	Ivan Radeljić (from (Germany) Energie Cottbus)
52	MF	TUR	Sezai Zehiroğlu (from (Germany) TSG 1899 Hoffenheim)
67	DF	TUR	Orhan Şam (from Hacettepe S.K.)
69	DF	TUR	Murat Kalkan (from Hacettepe S.K.)
88	DF	TUR	Aykut Demir (from (Netherlands) NAC Breda)
99	GK	TUR	Ulaş Güler (from Hacettepe S.K)
-	FW	TUR	Timur Kosovalı (from Antalyaspor)

Out: Note: Flags indicate national team as defined under FIFA eligibility rules; some limited exceptions apply. Players may hold more than one non-FIFA nationality.

No.	Pos.	Nation	Player
-	DF	TUR	Eren Aydın (to Manisaspor)
-	MF	TUR	Mehmet Nas (to Manisaspor)
-	FW	TUR	Ümit Tütünci (to Gaziantepspor)
-	DF	BFA	Lamine Traoré (free agent)
-	MF	AUS	James Troisi (to Kayserispor)
-	DF	TUR	Hakan Aslantaş (to Kayserispor)
-	DF	GHA	Daniel Addo (on loan to Hacettepe S.K.)
-	MF	TUR	Uğur Kapısız (to Hacettepe S.K)
-	FW	TUR	Kemal Akbaba (to Hacettepe S.K)
-	DF	TUR	Emre Balak (to Hacettepe S.K.)
-	MF	TUR	Soner Aydoğdu (to Hacettepe S.K.)
-	MF	TUR	Murat Kaya (on loan to Hacettepe S.K.)
-	DF	SRB	Ante Kulusic (to Hacettepe S.K.)
-	MF	TUR	Engin Baytar (to Trabzonspor)
-	MF	AUS	Mile Jedinak (to Antalyaspor)
-	MF	TUR	Koray Avcı (to Kasımpaşa S.K.)
-	GK	TUR	Recep Öztürk (to Konyaspor)

=== İstanbul BB ===
In: Note: Flags indicate national team as defined under FIFA eligibility rules; some limited exceptions apply. Players may hold more than one non-FIFA nationality.

No.	Pos.	Nation	Player
18	FW	CMR	Herve Tum (from Sivasspor)
27	DF	GUI	Kanfory Sylla (from Sivasspor)
13	MF	COD	Nsumbu Mazuwa (from Kocaelispor)
61	GK	TUR	Oğuzhan Bahadır (from Konyaspor)
-	FW	TUR	Taner Gülleri (from Kocaelispor)
-	DF	TUR	Can Arat (from Fenerbahçe)

Out: Note: Flags indicate national team as defined under FIFA eligibility rules; some limited exceptions apply. Players may hold more than one non-FIFA nationality.

No.	Pos.	Nation	Player
-	FW	BRA	Adriano Naschimento (Paraná Clube)
-	DF	NAM	Razundara Tjikuzu (to Trabzonspor)
-	FW	CMR	Gustave Bebbe (to MKE Ankaragücü)
-	MF	TUR	Erman Kılıç (to Sivasspor)
-	DF	TUR	Sancak Kaplan (to Kasımpaşa)

=== Kasımpaşa ===
In: Note: Flags indicate national team as defined under FIFA eligibility rules; some limited exceptions apply. Players may hold more than one non-FIFA nationality.

No.	Pos.	Nation	Player
3	DF	BRA	André Galiassi (from (Romania) CFR Cluj)
14	DF	CZE	Petr Pavlík (from (Czech Republic) FC Baník Ostrava)
16	GK	CZE	Petr Bolek (from (Czech Republic) FC Slovan Liberec)
17	FW	TUR	Şahin Aygüneş (from (Germany) Karlsruher SC)
18	FW	ARG	Diego Ruiz (from (Romania) CFR Cluj)
23	MF	MAR	Nourdin Boukhari (from (Netherlands) NAC Breda)
30	DF	TUR	Ali Güneş (from (Germany) SC Freiburg)
44	MF	SVK	Martin Baran (from (Slovakia) FC Tatran Prešov)
80	DF	DEN	Christian Keller (from (Norway) Stabæk)
-	MF	NOR	Azar Karadas (from (Norway) SK Brann)
-	FW	TUR	Gökhan Güleç (from Bursaspor)
-	MF	TUR	Koray Avcı (from Gençlerbirliği)
-	MF	TUR	Murat Erdoğan (from Sivasspor)
-	MF	TUR	Yasir Elmacı (from Gençlerbirliği)
-	DF	TUR	Barış Başdaş (from (Germany) Alemannia Aachen)
-	FW	TUR	Cenk İşler (from Manisaspor)
-	MF	TUR	Emre Toraman (from Eskişehirspor)
-	DF	TUR	Sancak Kaplan (from İstanbul BB)
-	MF	TUR	Sedat Yeşilkaya (from Çaykur Rizespor)

Out: Note: Flags indicate national team as defined under FIFA eligibility rules; some limited exceptions apply. Players may hold more than one non-FIFA nationality.

No.	Pos.	Nation	Player
-	MF	TUR	Batista (to Mersin İdman Yurdu)
-	DF	TUR	Ömer Hacısalihoğlu (to Konyaspor)
-	FW	TUR	Onur Çubukçu (to Bucaspor)
-	DF	TUR	Evren Kürkçü (to Çaykur Rizespor)
-	FW	TUR	Özgür Karakaya (to Sarıyer G.K.)

=== Kayserispor ===
In: Note: Flags indicate national team as defined under FIFA eligibility rules; some limited exceptions apply. Players may hold more than one non-FIFA nationality.

No.	Pos.	Nation	Player
6	MF	TUR	Merter Yüce (from Altayspor)
8	MF	TUR	Gökhan Emreciksin (from Fenerbahce)
9	FW	TUR	Ömer Şişmanoğlu (from (Germany) FC St. Pauli)
17	FW	TUR	Semih Aydilek (from (England) Birmingham City F.C.)
19	FW	POR	Ariza Makukula (loan from (Portugal) S.L. Benfica)
21	MF	AUS	James Troisi (from Gençlerbirliği)
38	DF	TUR	Hakan Aslantaş (from Gençlerbirliği)
53	DF	TUR	Serdar Kesimal (from (Germany) FC Köln)
89	GK	TUR	Gökhan Değirmenci (from Altayspor)
91	FW	TUR	Yaser Hacımustafaoğlu (from Kartalspor)

Out: Note: Flags indicate national team as defined under FIFA eligibility rules; some limited exceptions apply. Players may hold more than one non-FIFA nationality.

No.	Pos.	Nation	Player
9	FW	MNE	Milan Purovic (loan return to (Portugal) Sporting Lisbon)
17	FW	NGA	Julius Aghahowa (to (Ukraine) FC Shakhtar Donetsk)
18	MF	TUR	Tevfik Köse (to (Germany) Bayer 04 Leverkusen)
66	MF	TUR	Mehmet Topuz (to Fenerbahçe)
-	MF	TUR	Turgay Bahadır (to Bursaspor)
-	MF	TUR	Kemal Okyay (to Manisaspor)
-	MF	TUR	Ragıp Başdağ (to Eskişehirspor)
-	DF	TUR	Koray Çölgeçen (to MKE Ankaragücü)

=== Manisaspor ===
In: Note: Flags indicate national team as defined under FIFA eligibility rules; some limited exceptions apply. Players may hold more than one non-FIFA nationality.

No.	Pos.	Nation	Player
1	GK	TUR	İlker Avcıbay (from Konyaspor)
4	DF	TUR	Burak Özsaraç (from Ankaragücü)
6	MF	BIH	Vlastimir Jovanović (from (Bosnia and Herzegovina) FK Slavija)
7	MF	TUR	Mehmet Nas (from Gençlerbirliği)
9	MF	CAN	Josh Simpson (from (Germany) FC Kaiserslautern)
17	FW	TUR	Yaser Yıldız (from Galatasaray)
18	DF	BFA	Rahim Ouédraogo (from (Netherlands) FC Emmen)
20	FW	NGA	Isaac Promise (loan from Trabzonspor)
27	MF	TUR	Kemal Okyay (from Kayserispor)
34	DF	TUR	Eren Aydın (from Gençlerbirliği)
55	DF	LBR	Jimmy Dixon (from (Sweden) Malmö FF)
85	DF	TUR	Ferhat Çökmüş (from Trabzonspor)
-	MF	TUR	Dilaver Güçlü (from (Germany) VfL Bochum II)
-	MF	TUR	Mehmet Güven (from Galatasaray)
-	GK	TUR	Orkun Usak (from Galatasaray)

Out: Note: Flags indicate national team as defined under FIFA eligibility rules; some limited exceptions apply. Players may hold more than one non-FIFA nationality.

No.	Pos.	Nation	Player
12	DF	FRA	Stéphane Borbiconi (to (France) FC Metz)
15	DF	TUR	Ferhat Öztorun (to Trabzonspor)
16	FW	BRA	Rafael (to (Japan) Omiya Ardija)
21	FW	AUT	Muhammet Hanifi Akagündüz (to (Austria) VfB Admira Wacker Mödling)
-	FW	TUR	Sinan Özkan (to Giresunspor)
-	DF	TUR	Burak Denizli (to Adana Demirspor)
-	DF	TUR	Erman Güraçar (to Bucaspor)
-	GK	TUR	Ufuk Ceylan (to Galatasaray)
-	FW	TUR	Cenk İşler (to Kasımpaşa S.K.)
-	DF	TUR	Tolga Doğantez (to Diyarbakırspor)

=== Sivasspor ===
In: Note: Flags indicate national team as defined under FIFA eligibility rules; some limited exceptions apply. Players may hold more than one non-FIFA nationality.

No.	Pos.	Nation	Player
11	MF	TUR	Erman Kılıç (from İstanbul BB)
18	MF	TUR	Cihan Yılmaz (from Karşıyaka S.K.)
20	MF	TUR	Kadir Bekmezci (from Hacettepe S.K.)
23	DF	TUR	Yasin Çakmak (from Fenerbahçe)
28	FW	TUR	Ersen Martin (from (Spain) Recreativo de Huelva)
44	DF	COD	Pieter Mbemba (from (Netherlands) FC Eindhoven)
67	DF	TUR	Uğur Kavuk (from Antalyaspor)
80	FW	NGA	Akeem Agbetu (from (Denmark) Kolding FC)
-	MF	GAB	Bruno Mbanangoye Zita (from (Belarus) FC Dinamo Minsk)
-	MF	TUR	Ferhat Bıkmaz (from (Germany) Hannover 96 II)
-	FW	TUR	İbrahim Şahin (from Hacettepe S.K.)
-	FW	TUR	İbrahim Ülüm (from Belediye Vanspor)

Out: Note: Flags indicate national team as defined under FIFA eligibility rules; some limited exceptions apply. Players may hold more than one non-FIFA nationality.

No.	Pos.	Nation	Player
3	DF	BRA	Fábio Bilica (to Fenerbahçe)
8	DF	GUI	Kanfory Sylla (to İstanbul BB)
11	MF	BRA	Sergio Pacheco (to (Azerbaijan) Inter Baku)
17	FW	ISR	Pini Balili (to Antalyaspor)
20	MF	BEL	Mohammed Ali Kurtuluş (to Kocaelispor)
54	FW	CMR	Hervé Tum (to İstanbul BB)
-	DF	GUI	Mamadou Alimou Diallo (to Diyarbakırspor)
-	MF	TUR	Murat Erdoğan (to Kasımpaşa S.K.)
-	MF	TUR	Faruk Bayar (to MKE Ankaragücü)
-	FW	TUR	İbrahim Ülüm (to Diyarbakırspor)
-	FW	TUR	Tayfun Emre Yılmaz (to Sakaryaspor)
-	DF	TUR	Eyüp Kadri Ataoğlu (to Çaykur Rizespor)

=== Trabzonspor ===
In: Note: Flags indicate national team as defined under FIFA eligibility rules; some limited exceptions apply. Players may hold more than one non-FIFA nationality.

No.	Pos.	Nation	Player
5	MF	TUR	Engin Baytar (from Gençlerbirliği)
7	MF	TUR	Zafer Yelen (from (Germany) F.C. Hansa Rostock)
15	DF	TUR	Ferhat Öztorun (from Manisaspor)
28	MF	NAM	Razundara Tjikuzu (from İstanbul BB)
33	MF	CRO	Drago Gabric (from (Croatia) HNK Hajduk Split)

Out: Note: Flags indicate national team as defined under FIFA eligibility rules; some limited exceptions apply. Players may hold more than one non-FIFA nationality.

No.	Pos.	Nation	Player
5	MF	TUR	Hüseyin Cimşir (to Bursaspor)
14	FW	NGA	Isaac Promise (loan to Manisaspor)
27	MF	BDI	Faty Papy (loan to (Netherlands) MVV)
-	DF	TUR	Ferhat Çökmüş (to Manisaspor)
-	DF	TUR	Eren Görür (to Giresunspor)
-	DF	TUR	Ahmet Buğra Erdoğan (to Giresunspor)
-	DF	TUR	İsmail Özeren (loan to Çanakkale Dardanelspor)
