= List of Turkish football transfers 2008–09 =

This is a list of Turkish football transfers for the 2008–09 season. Only moves from and/or to the Süper Lig are listed.

== Summer transfer window ==
=== May ===
According to Transfer Dosyasi at

Date	Name	Nat	Moving from	Moving to	Fee
May, 2007	A. Buğra Erdoğan	(Turkey)	Çanakkale Dardanelspor	Trabzonspor	Undisclosed
May, 2008	Bruce Djite	(Australia)	Adelaide United	Gençlerbirliği	€500,000
May, 2007	Egemen Korkmaz	(Turkey)	Bursaspor	Trabzonspor	Free
May, 2007	Emre Belözoglu	(Turkey)	Newcastle United	Fenerbahçe	€4,500,000
May, 2007	Emrah Kol	(Turkey)	Trabzonspor	Çaykur Rizespor	Undisclosed
May, 2007	Emre Aşık	(Turkey)	Ankaraspor	Galatasaray	Loan Return
May, 2008	Gustavo Colman	(Argentina)	Germinal Beerschot	Trabzonspor	€1,000,000
May, 2008	Harun Erbek	(Austria) (Turkey)	SV Ried	Kayserispor	Undisclosed
May, 2008	İlhan Eker	(Turkey)	Hacettepespor	Gençlerbirliği	Undisclosed
May, 2008	İsmail Özeren	(Turkey)	Çanakkale Dardanelspor	Trabzonspor	Undisclosed
May, 2008	Karim Saidi	(Tunisia)	Sivasspor	Feyenoord	End of Loan
May, 2008	Mohamed Cissé	(Guinea)	Bursaspor	Alania Vladikavkaz	Free
May, 2007	Murat Şenyayla	(Turkey)	Denizli Belediyespor	Denizlispor	Free
May, 2008	Mustafa Pektemek	(Turkey)	Sakaryaspor	Gençlerbirliği	Undisclosed
May, 2008	Giray Kaçar	(Turkey)	Hacettepespor	Trabzonspor	€1,700,000
May, 2008	Ricardinho	(Brazil)	Beşiktaş	Al Rayyan	Free
May, 2008	Selçuk İnan	(Turkey)	Vestel Manisaspor	Trabzonspor	€2,250,000
May, 2008	Tevfik Köse	(Germany) (Turkey)	Ankaraspor	Kayserispor	Loan
May, 2008	Tuna Üzümcü	(Turkey)	Gençlerbirliği	Beşiktaş	Undisclosed
May, 2008	Ufukhan Bayraktar	(Turkey)	Trabzonspor	Manisaspor	Part Exchange
May, 2008	Ümit Aydın	(Turkey) (Germany)	Bursaspor	Karabükspor	Free

=== June ===
According to Transfer Dosyasi

Date	Name	Nat	Moving from	Moving to	Fee
June, 2008	Abdulaziz Solmaz	(Turkey)	Pazarspor	Trabzonspor	
June, 2008	Abdullah Çetin	(Turkey)	Diyarbakırspor	Antalyaspor	Free
June, 2008	Adamu Mohammed	(Ghana)	Gençlerbirliği	Hacettepespor	Loan
June, 2008	Adriano De Melo Bezerra	(Brazil)	Vasco da Gama	Bursaspor	
June, 2008	Ahmet Sağlam	(Turkey) (Germany)	Eyüpspor	Eskişehirspor	
June, 2008	Ahmet Şahin	(Turkey)	Trabzonspor	Adanaspor	Free
June, 2008	Alper Kalemci	(Turkey)	Marmaris Belediyespor	Hacettepespor	Loan
June, 2008	Amir Azmy	(Egypt)	Famagusta	Hacettepespor	
June, 2008	Anderson	(Brazil)	Çaykur Rizespor	Eskişehirspor	
June, 2008	Armağan Kuş	(Turkey)	Samsunspor	Kayserispor	€25,000
June, 2008	Ayman Abdelaziz	(Egypt) (Turkey)	Trabzonspor	El Zamalek	Free
June, 2008	Barbaros Barut	(Turkey)	Kasımpaşa S.K.	Ankaragücü	
June, 2008	Bilica	(Brazil)	U Cluj	Sivasspor	
June, 2008	Barbosa Tabata	(Brazil)	Santos	Gaziantepspor	
June, 2008	Baykal Yılmaz	(Turkey)	Beylerbeyispor	Hacettepespor	Undisclosed
June, 2008	Bayram Çetin	(Turkey)	Altınordu	Kayserispor	Undisclosed
June, 2008	Burak Özsaraç	(Turkey)	Konyaspor	Ankaragücü	Free
June, 2008	Burak Yılmaz	(Turkey)	Manisaspor	Fenerbahçe S.K.	
June, 2008	Bülent Bölükbaşı	(Turkey)	Gaziantepspor	Kocaelispor	
June, 2008	Caner Altın	(Turkey)	Samsunspor	Konyaspor	Undisclosed
June, 2008	Cenk İşler	(Turkey)	Antalyaspor	Manisaspor	
June, 2008	Ceyhun Eriş	(Turkey)	Konyaspor	FC Seoul	
June, 2008	Ceyhun Gülselam	(Turkey) (Germany)	SpVgg Unterhaching	Trabzonspor	
June, 2008	Cihan Haspolatlı	(Turkey)	Bursaspor	Konyaspor	
June, 2008	Çağdaş Atan	(Turkey)	Trabzonspor	Energie Cottbus	Free
June, 2008	Çağrı Yarkın	(Turkey)	Galatasaray	Çaykur Rizespor	Part Exchange
June, 2008	Dimitar Ivankov	(Bulgaria)	Kayserispor	Bursaspor	Free
June, 2008	Đorđe Tutorić	(Serbia)	Red Star Belgrade	Kocaelispor	
June, 2008	Douglas Daniel Braga	(Brazil)	Rio Claro	Denizlispor	
June, 2008	Dušan Anđelković	(Serbia)	Red Star Belgrade	Kocaelispor	
June, 2008	Edim Demir	(Turkey)	İskenderun Demir Çelikspor	Ankaragücü	
June, 2008	Ekrem Dağ	(Turkey) (Austria)	Gaziantepspor	Beşiktaş	€700,000
June, 2008	Emrah Eren	(Turkey)	Çaykur Rizespor	Gaziantepspor	
June, 2008	Emrah Kol	(Turkey)	Trabzonspor	Çaykur Rizespor	
June, 2008	Emrah Kiraz	(Turkey)	Bursaspor	Giresunspor	
June, 2008	Emre Balak	(Turkey)	Samsunspor	Gençlerbirliği	
June, 2008	Emre Toraman	(Turkey)	Eskişehirspor	Free	Free
June, 2008	Eren Görür	(Turkey)	Pazarspor	Trabzonspor	
June, 2008	Eren Güngör	(Turkey)	Altay	Kayserispor	Undisclosed
June, 2008	Erman Özgür	(Turkey)	Konyaspor	Gaziantepspor	Free
June, 2008	Fatih Altundağ	(Turkey) (Germany)	Hamburger SV II	Trabzonspor	
June, 2008	Fatih Egedik	(Turkey)	Denizlispor	Konyaspor	
June, 2008	Fatih Şen	(Turkey)	Gaziantepspor	G.Antep B. Bel.spor	Undisclosed
June, 2008	Federico Higuaín	(Argentina) (Spain)	Beşiktaş	Independiente	Free
June, 2008	Ferdi Elmas	(Turkey)	Çaykur Rizespor	Galatasaray	Part Exchange
June, 2008	François Zoko	(Ivory Coast)	Mons	Gençlerbirliği OFTAŞ	
June, 2008	Gökhan Güleç	(Turkey)	Beşiktaş	Bursaspor	
June, 2008	Gökhan Ünal	(Turkey)	Kayserispor	Trabzonspor	€5,000,000
June, 2008	Gökhan Yetgin	(Turkey)	Karsspor	Hacettepespor	
June, 2008	Güven Güneri	(Turkey)	Fenerbahçe S.K.	Manisaspor	Part Exchange
June, 2008	Hakan Bayraktar	(Turkey) (Belgium)	Diyarbakırspor	Gaziantepspor	
June, 2008	Hakan Şükür	(Turkey)	Galatasaray	Free	Free
June, 2008	Halil Zeybek	(Turkey)	Erzurumspor	Bursaspor	
June, 2008	Hamílton	(Togo) (Brazil)	Ankaraspor	Boca Júnior do Sergipe	Free
June, 2008	Hasan Köse	(Turkey)	Araklıspor	Hacettepespor	
June, 2008	Hrvoje Čale	(Croatia)	Dinamo Zagreb	Trabzonspor	€2,200,000
June, 2008	İbrahim Dağaşan	(Turkey)	Bursaspor	Sivasspor	
June, 2008	İbrahim Kaş	(Turkey)	Beşiktaş	Getafe Madrid	Free
June, 2008	İbrahim Öztürk	(Turkey)	Altay	Bursaspor	
June, 2008	Ismael Bouzid	(Algeria) (France)	Galatasaray	Troyes AC	Free
June, 2008	İsmail Güldüren	(Turkey)	Bursaspor	Konyaspor	Free
June, 2008	Irineu Couto	(Brazil)	Cruzeiro	Denizlispor	
June, 2008	Julio Cesar	(Brazil)	Belasistsa	Kocaelispor	
June, 2008	Julius Aghahowa	(Nigeria)	Wigan Athletic	Kayserispor	
June, 2008	Kamel Ghilas	(Algeria)	Guimarães	Kocaelispor	
June, 2008	Kayhan Arduç	(Turkey)	Zeytinburnuspor	Denizlispor	
June, 2008	Kemal Aslan	(Turkey)	Fenerbahçe S.K.	Gaziantepspor	Free
June, 2008	Koray Avcı	(Turkey)	Vestel Manisaspor	Gençlerbirliği	Free
June, 2008	Leandro	(Brazil)	Sao Caetano	Bursaspor	
June, 2008	Luka Vučko	(Croatia)	NK Rijeka	Eskişehirspor	
June, 2008	Marcelinho Rodrigues	(Brazil)	Sao Caetano	Bursaspor	
June, 2008	Marquinhos	(Brazil)	Çaykur Rizespor	İst. B. Belediyespor	
June, 2008	Mehmet Çoğum	(Turkey)	Gaziantepspor	Konyaspor	Undisclosed
June, 2008	Mehmet Uslu	(Turkey)	Sakaryaspor	Hacettepespor	
June, 2008	Mehmet Yozgatlı	(Turkey) (Germany)	Beşiktaş	Gaziantepspor	
June, 2008	Mehmet Yılmaz	(Turkey)	Ankaraspor	Ankaragücü	
June, 2008	Metin Hartamacı	(Turkey)	Ankaraspor	Ankaragücü	
June, 2008	Mohamed Dahmane	(Algeria) (France)	Mons	Eskişehirspor	
June, 2008	Moïn Chaabani	(Tunisia)	Esperance	Ankaragücü	
May, 2008	Murat Önür	(Turkey)	Diyarbakırspor	Eskişehirspor	Undisclosed
June, 2008	Murat Şahin	(Turkey)	Beşiktaş	Gaziantepspor	Free
June, 2008	Musa Büyük	(Turkey)	Trabzonspor	Kocaelispor	
June, 2008	Musa Sinan Yılmazer	(Turkey)	Sarıyer	Denizlispor	
June, 2008	Muslu Nalbantoglu	(Turkey) (Netherlands)	NEC Nijmegen	Kayserispor	
June, 2008	Mustafa Cevahir	(Turkey)	Fenerbahçe	Gaziantepspor	
June, 2008	Mustafa Keçeli	(Turkey)	Trabzonspor	Bursaspor	
June, 2008	Mustafa Yumlu	(Turkey)	Arsinspor	Trabzonspor	Undisclosed
June, 2008	Necdet Kaba	(Turkey)	A. Sebatspor	Trabzonspor	Undisclosed
June, 2008	Oğuz Sabankay	(Turkey)	Galatasaray	Eskişehirspor	Loan
June, 2008	Okan Öztürk	(Turkey)	Gençlerbirliği	Çaykur Rizespor	
June, 2008	Okan Buruk	(Turkey)	Galatasaray	İstanbul B. Bel.spor	
June, 2008	Ozan İpek	(Turkey)	İstanbulspor	Ankaragücü	
June, 2008	Ömer Aysan Barış	(Turkey)	Bursaspor	Ankaraspor	Free
June, 2008	Omer Riza	(England) (Turkey)	Trabzonspor	Free	Free
June, 2008	Ömer Çatkıç	(Turkey)	Gaziantepspor	Antalyaspor	Free
June, 2008	Salomon Olembe	(Cameroon)	Wigan Athletic	Kayserispor	
June, 2008	Rigobert Song	(Cameroon) (France)	Galatasaray	Trabzonspor	Free
June, 2008	Safet Nadarević	(Bosnia and Herzegovina)	NK Zagreb	Eskişehirspor	
June, 2008	Sayed Moawad	(Egypt)	Trabzonspor	Al Ahly	
June, 2008	Sami Büyüktopaç	(Turkey) (Netherlands)	NEC Nijmegen	Trabzonspor	
June, 2008	Sarper Kıskaç	(Turkey)	Ankaragücü	Standard Liège	
June, 2008	Selçuk Yıldırım	(Turkey)	Arsinspor	Trabzonspor	Undisclosed
June, 2008	Serdar Kulbilge	(Turkey)	Fenerbahçe	Kocaelispor	
June, 2008	Serhat Gülpınar	(Turkey)	Denizlispor	İst. B. Belediyespor	
June, 2008	Sertan Eser	(Turkey)	İst. B. Belediyespor	Kasımpaşa S.K.	
June, 2008	Sinan Kaloğlu	(Turkey)	Bursaspor	VfL Bochum	
June, 2008	Souleymanou Hamidou	(Cameroon)	Denizlispor	Kayserispor	
June, 2008	Taylan Eliaçık	(Turkey)	Kahramanmaraşspor	Sivasspor	Undisclosed
June, 2008	Tayfun Türkmen	(Turkey)	Ankaraspor	Eskişehirspor	
June, 2008	Tomáš Sivok	(Czech Republic)	Udinese	Beşiktaş	€4,700,000
June, 2008	Tomas Zapotocny	(Czech Republic)	Udinese	Beşiktaş	
June, 2008	Vanja Iveša	(Croatia)	NK Slaven Belupo	Eskişehirspor	
June, 2008	Volkan Arslan	(Turkey) (Germany)	Gaziantepspor	Antalyaspor	
June, 2008	Volkan Kolaçoğlu	(Turkey)	İstanbul B. Bel.spor	Çaykur Rizespor	
June, 2008	Uğur Akdemir	(Turkey)	Galatasaray	Çaykur Rizespor	Part Exchange
June, 2008	Uğur Kapısız	(Turkey)	Beykoz 1908	Gençlerbirliği	
June, 2008	Umut Koçin	(Turkey) (Germany)	Arminia Bielefeld	Kayserispor	
June, 2008	Yakup Bugun	(Turkey)	Altınordu	Trabzonspor	Undisclosed
June, 2008	Yaser Yıldız	(Turkey)	Kartalspor	Galatasaray	Undisclosed
June, 2008	Yasir Elmacı	(Turkey)	Sivasspor	Gençlerbirliği	Undisclosed
June, 2008	Yusuf Soysal	(Turkey)	Kayseri Erciyesspor	Ankaragücü	
June, 2008	Yusuf Şimşek	(Turkey)	Denizlispor	Bursaspor	
June, 2008	Zafer Aydoğdu	(Turkey)	A. Sebatspor	Trabzonspor	Undisclosed
June, 2008	Zafer Demir	(Turkey)	Denizlispor	Konyaspor	Undisclosed

=== July ===
According to Transfer Dosyasi

Date	Name	Nat	Moving from	Moving to	Fee
July, 2008	Adem Büyük	(Turkey)	Beşiktaş	Manisaspor	Part Exchange
July, 2008	Ahmet Kuru	(Turkey) (Germany)	FC St. Pauli	Antalyaspor	
July, 2008	Akın Sinan Dağdelen	(Turkey)	Antalyaspor	Orduspor	
July, 2008	Ali Çamdalı	(Turkey)	Kayserispor	Kayseri Erciyesspor	
July, 2008	Baki Mercimek	(Turkey)	Beşiktaş	Ankaraspor	Free
July, 2008	Behram Zülaloğlu	(Turkey)	Kocaelispor	İst. B. Bel.spor	
July, 2008	Betinho	(Brazil)	Marília Atlético Clube	Ankaragücü	
July, 2008	Bilal Aziz	(Lebanon)	VfL Osnabrück	Kayserispor	
July, 2008	Bilal Çubukçu	(Turkey) (Germany)	Hertha BSC Berlin	Gençlerbirliği	
July, 2008	Bulut Basmaz	(Turkey)	Denizlispor	Manisaspor	
July, 2008	Celalettin İmal	(Turkey)	Ankaragücü	Yimpaş Yozgatspor	
July, 2008	Dani Güiza	(Spain)	RCD Mallorca	Fenerbahçe SK	€14,000,000
July, 2008	Darryl Roberts	(Trinidad and Tobago)	Sparta Rotterdam	Denizlispor	
July, 2008	Demircan Dikmen	(Germany) (Turkey)	Hertha BSC Berlin	Antalyaspor	
July, 2008	Engin Çiçem	(Germany) (Turkey)	İst. B. Belediyespor	1. FC Köln	
July, 2008	Erdal Güneş	(Turkey)	Gaziantepspor	Altay S.K.	
July, 2008	Erdal Kılıçaslan	(Turkey)	Gaziantepspor	Konyaspor	Part Exchange
July, 2008	Eren Özen	(Turkey)	Hacettepespor	Malatyaspor	
June, 2008	Erhan Albayrak	(Turkey) (Germany)	Ankaraspor	Konyaspor	Free
July, 2008	Erkan Sekman	(Turkey)	Konyaspor	Gaziantepspor	Part Exchange
July, 2008	Eser Yağmur	(Turkey) (Germany)	Bursaspor	Karşıyaka S.K.	Free
July, 2008	Eyüp Kadri Ataoglu	(Turkey)	Trabzonspor	Sivasspor	
July, 2008	Fahri Tatan	(Turkey)	Beşiktaş	Konyaspor	1,700,000 TL
July, 2008	Faruk Bayar	(Turkey)	Kasımpaşa S.K.	Sivasspor	
July, 2008	Fatih Şen	(Turkey)	Kocaelispor	Orduspor	
July, 2008	Fernando Meira	(Portugal)	VfB Stuttgart	Galatasaray	€3,800,000
July, 2008	Gökhan Bozkaya	(Turkey) (Germany)	Sivasspor	Malatyaspor	
July, 2008	Gökhan Çalışal	(Turkey)	Eskişehirspor	Boluspor	
July, 2008	Hakan Çimen	(Turkey)	Kocaelispor	Orduspor	
July, 2008	Harry Kewell	(Australia)	Liverpool	Galatasaray	Free
July, 2008	Haydar Koç	(Turkey)	Kocaelispor	Orduspor	
July, 2008	Herve Tum	(Cameroon)	RC Strasbourg	Sivasspor	
July, 2008	Ibrahim Said	(Egypt)	Çaykur Rizespor	Ismaily	$200,000
July, 2008	Ilhan Şahin	(Turkey)	İst. B. Belediyespor	Boluspor	
July, 2008	Isaac Promise	(Nigeria)	Gençlerbirliği	Trabzonspor	Free
July, 2008	Jefferson	(Brazil)	Trabzonspor	Konyaspor	
July, 2008	Kemal Okyay	(Turkey)	Kayserispor	Kayseri Erciyesspor	
July, 2008	Kenan Özer	(Turkey)	Beşiktaş	Kayseri Erciyesspor	
July, 2008	Kirita	(Romania)	Ankaragücü	Bursaspor	Free
July, 2008	Korhan Öztürk	(Turkey)	Elazığspor	Antalyaspor	
July, 2008	Marcelo Carrusca	(Argentina)	Galatasaray	Cruz Azul	Loan
July, 2008	Marquinhos	(Brazil)	Çaykur Rizespor	İst. B. Belediyespor	
July, 2008	Matías Escobar	(Argentina)	Gimnasia	Kayserispor	
July, 2008	Mehmet Aurélio	(Turkey) (Brazil)	Fenerbahçe SK	Real Betis	Free
July, 2008	Mehmet Çakır	(Turkey)	Gençlerbirliği	Ankaraspor	
July, 2008	Mehmet Yılmaz	(Turkey)	Ankaraspor	Ankaragücü	
July, 2008	Metin Aslan	(Turkey)	Antalyaspor	Orduspor	
July, 2008	Murat Ocak	(Turkey)	Trabzonspor	Manisaspor	
July, 2008	Murat Yılmaz	(Turkey)	Orhangazispor	Sivasspor	
July, 2008	Mustafa Aşan	(Turkey)	Beşiktaş	Manisaspor	Part Exchange
July, 2008	Nenad Jestrovic	(Serbia)	Red Star Belgrade	Kocaelispor	
July, 2008	Olcan Adın	(Turkey)	Fenerbahçe SK	Gaziantepspor	
July, 2008	Orhan Ak	(Turkey)	Galatasaray	Antalyaspor	
July, 2008	Özgür Bayer	(Turkey)	Gaziantepspor	Kocaelispor	
July, 2008	Özgür Öçal	(Turkey)	Kasımpaşa S.K.	Eskişehirspor	
July, 2008	Patrice Njekou	(Cameroon)	Union Douala	Kocaelispor	
July, 2008	Serhat Akyüz	(Turkey)	Çaykur Rizespor	Konyaspor	
July, 2008	Stjepan Poljak	(Croatia)	Slaven Belupo	Eskişehirspor	
July, 2008	Şener Aşkaroğlu	(Turkey)	Manisaspor	Konyaspor	
July, 2008	Tayfur Emre Yılmaz	(Turkey)	Malatyaspor	Sivasspor	
July, 2008	Tony Sylva	(Senegal)	Lille	Trabzonspor	Undisclosed
July, 2008	Theo Lewis	(Liberia)	Watanga FC	Ankaraspor	
July, 2008	Uğur İnceman	(Turkey) (Germany)	Manisaspor	Beşiktaş	Part Exc.+ €1,000,000
July, 2008	Ümit Tütünci	(Turkey)	Hacettepespor	Gençlerbirliği	Undisclosed
July, 2008	Volkan Koçaloğlu	(Turkey)	İst. B. Belediyespor	Çaykur Rizespor	
July, 2008	Xheyahir Sukaj	(Albania)	Vllaznia	Gençlerbirliği	
July, 2008	Yalçın Ayhan	(Turkey)	İstanbulspor	Antalyapor	
July, 2008	Yusuf Emre Kasal	(Germany) (Turkey)	Würzburger FV	Eskişehirspor	
July, 2008	Zafer Cansız	(Turkey)	Ofspor	Trabzonspor	Undisclosed

=== August ===
According to Transfer Dosyasi

Date	Name	Nat	Moving from	Moving to	Fee
August, 2008	Admir Teli	(Albania)	Vllaznia	Hacettepespor	
August, 2008	Ahmet Devret	(Turkey)	Konyaspor	G.Antep B. Bel.spor	
August, 2008	Ali Bayraktar	(Turkey)	Hacettepespor	Denizlispor	
August, 2008	Aytaç Ak	(Turkey)	Sivasspor	Diyarbakırspor	
August, 2008	Aytekin Viduşlu	(Turkey)	Antalyaspor	Orduspor	
August, 2008	Berkay Onarıcı	(Turkey)	Eskişehirspor	Göztepe	Loan
August, 2008	Burak Tok	(Turkey) (Germany)	1. FC Nürnberg	Antalyaspor	
August, 2008	Bülent Ertuğrul	(Turkey)	Denizlispor	Eskişehirspor	
August, 2008	Bülent Kocabey	(Turkey)	Hacettepespor	Eskişehirspor	
August, 2008	Engin Aktürk	(Turkey)	Ankaragücü	Çaykur Rizespor	
August, 2008	Eray Birniçan	(Turkey)	Konyaspor	Samsunspor	
August, 2008	Ercan Yaman	(Turkey)	Sakaryaspor	Denizlispor	
August, 2008	Gilman Lika	(Albania)	Vllaznia	Hacettepespor	
August, 2008	Gökhan Çakır	(Turkey)	Konyaspor	Adana Demirspor	
August, 2008	Hasan Uğur	(Turkey)	Antalyaspor	Sakaryaspor	
August, 2008	İlhan Ummak	(Turkey)	Sivasspor	Çaykur Rizespor	
August, 2008	Krunoslav Lovrek	(Croatia)	NK Zagreb	Eskişehirspor	
August, 2008	Leonardo Andrés Iglesias	(Argentina)	Kayserispor	Ankaragücü	
August, 2008	Mahmut Hanefi Erdoğdu	(Turkey)	Sivasspor	Diyarbakırspor	
August, 2008	Mahmut Karıklar	(Turkey)	Antalyaspor	Karabükspor	
August, 2008	Mehmet Yılmaz	(Turkey)	Bursaspor	Adanaspor	
August, 2008	Mertol Karatay	(Turkey) (Brazil)	Konyaspor	Kasımpaşa S.K.	
August, 2008	Milan Baroš	(Czech Republic)	Olympique Lyonnais	Galatasaray S.K.	
August, 2008	Mustafa Akçay	(Turkey) (Germany)	SV Stuttgarter Kickers	Antalyaspor	
August, 2008	Mustafa Özkan	(Turkey) (Germany)	Ankaragücü	Antalyaspor	
August, 2008	Necati Ateş	(Turkey)	Galatasaray	Real Sociedad	Free
August, 2008	Ömer Kaplan	(Turkey)	Sivasspor	Diyarbakırspor	
August, 2008	Recep Yıldız	(Turkey) (Germany)	SV Stuttgarter Kickers	Antalyaspor	
August, 2008	Renny Vega	(Venezuela)	Bursaspor	Denizlispor	
August, 2008	Sedat Ağçay	(Turkey)	Konyaspor	Antalyaspor	
August, 2008	Serdar Sınık	(Turkey)	Antalyaspor	Orduspor	
August, 2008	Serge Djiehoua	(Ivory Coast)	Kaizer Chiefs	Antalyaspor	
August, 2008	Serhat Akın	(Turkey) (Germany)	RSC Anderlecht	Kocaelispor	
August, 2008	Sezer Sezgin	(Turkey)	Beşiktaş J.K.	Boluspor	Loan
August, 2008	Souleymane Youla	(Guinea) (Turkey)	Lille OSC	Eskişehirspor	
August, 2008	Tolga Seyhan	(Turkey)	Shaktar Donetsk	Kocaelispor	
August, 2008	Volkan Altın	(Turkey) (Germany)	SV Sandhausen	Antalyaspor	
August, 2008	Ufuk Ateş	(Turkey)	Antalyaspor	Orduspor	
August, 2008	Ümit Aydın	(Turkey) (Germany)	Bursaspor	Karabükspor	
August, 2008	James Troisi	(Australia)	Newcastle United	Gençlerbirliği	Free

== Winter transfer window ==
=== January ===
According to Transfer Dosyasi

Date	Name	Nat	Moving from	Moving to	Fee
January, 2009	Abdulaziz Solmaz	(Turkey)	Trabzonspor	Ankaragücü	
January, 2009	Tümer Metin	(Turkey)	Fenerbahçe	Larissa	Free
January, 2009	Abdülkadir Kayalı	(Turkey)	Ankaragücü	Fenerbahçe	€1,000,000
January, 2009	Ali Tandoğan	(Turkey)	Beşiktaş	Bursaspor	
January, 2009	Alanzinho	(Brazil)	Stabæk	Trabzonspor	€3,900,000
January, 2009	Ante Kulušić	(Croatia)	HNK Šibenik	Hacettepe SK	
January, 2009	Antonio de Nigris	(Mexico)	Ankaraspor	Ankaragücü	Loan
January, 2009	Arda Yavuz	(Turkey)	Rot-Weiss Essen	Hacettepe SK	
January, 2009	Batuhan Karadeniz	(Turkey)	Beşiktaş	Eskişehirspor	Loan
January, 2009	Bojan Isailović	(Serbia)	FK Čukarički Stankom	Gençlerbirliği	
January, 2009	Bülent Bölükbaşı	(Turkey)	Kocaelispor	Konyaspor	
January, 2009	Caner Ağca	(Turkey)	Malatyaspor	Ankaraspor	
January, 2009	Cem Can	(Turkey)	Ankaragücü	Gençlerbirliği	
January, 2009	Dani	(Brazil)	América RN	Bursaspor	
January, 2009	Diallo	(Guinea)	Sivasspor	Hacettepe SK	Loan
January, 2009	El Saka	(Egypt)	Gençlerbirliği	Eskişehirspor	
January, 2009	Emre Özkan	(Turkey)	Beşiktaş	Eskişehirspor	Loan
January, 2009	Eren Aydın	(Turkey)	Ankaraspor	Gençlerbirliği	
January, 2009	Erkan Zengin	(Sweden)	Hammarby	Beşiktaş	Loan
January, 2009	Fabian Ernst	(Germany)	Schalke 04	Beşiktaş J.K.	
January, 2009	Fatih Ceylan	(Turkey)	Kayserispor	Antalyaspor	
January, 2009	Fatih Özer	(Turkey)	Konyaspor	Göztepe	Loan
January, 2009	Faty Papy	(Burundi)	Inter Star	Trabzonspor	
January, 2009	Gökhan Emreciksin	(Turkey)	Ankaragücü	Fenerbahçe	€1,000,000
January, 2009	Hasan Üçüncü	(Turkey)	Free	Ankaragücü	
January, 2009	Hurşit Meriç	(Turkey) (Netherlands)	ADO Den Haag	Gençlerbirliği	
January, 2009	İlhan Özbay	(Turkey)	Kayseri Erciyesspor	Gaziantepspor	
January, 2009	Jacques Momha	(Cameroon)	Vitória S.C.	Gençlerbirliği	
January, 2009	Julio Cesar	(Brazil)	Dinamo București	Gaziantepspor	
January, 2009	Matias Escobar	(Argentina)	Kayserispor	Rosario Central	
January, 2009	Mehmet Akif Tatlı	(Turkey)	Eskişehirspor	Göztepe	
January, 2009	Ronald Gutiérrez	(Bolivia)	Bursaspor	Bolívar	
January, 2009	Mehmet Polat	(Turkey)	Gaziantepspor	Gençlerbirliği	
January, 2009	Mile Jedinak	(Australia)	Central Coast Mariners	Gençlerbirliği	
January, 2009	Özgür Bayer	(Turkey)	Kocaelispor	Ankaragücü	
January, 2009	Patiyo Tambwe	(Democratic Republic of the Congo)	SC Lokeren	Hacettepe SK	
January, 2009	Ramazan Kahya	(Turkey)	Malatyaspor	Ankaraspor	
January, 2009	Roguy Méyé	(Gabon)	Zalaegerszegi TE	Ankaraspor	€1,000,000
January, 2009	Selçuk Şahin	(Turkey) (Germany)	Kartalspor	Hacettepe SK	
January, 2009	Branimir Poljac	(Norway)	Moss FK	Konyaspor	
January, 2009	Tayfur Emre Yılmaz	(Turkey)	Sivasspor	Göztepe	Loan
January, 2009	Tita	(Brazil)	Ankaraspor	Antalyaspor	Loan
January, 2009	Wescley Pina Gonçalves	(Brazil)	Criciuma EC	Denizlispor	
January, 2009	Yannick Kamanan	(France)	Maccabi Tel Aviv	Sivasspor	€100,000
January, 2009	Yusuf Şimşek	(Turkey)	Bursaspor	Beşiktaş	€600,000
January, 2009	Tonia Tisdell	(Liberia)		Ankaraspor	
