= 2009–10 Bursaspor season =

Bursaspor
2009–10 season
- Chairman: İbrahim Yazıcı
- Manager: Ertuğrul Sağlam
- Süper Lig: 1st - Champions
- Turkish Cup: Quarter-finals
- Top goalscorer: League: Ozan İpek (8); Pablo Batalla (8); All: Ozan İpek (9)
- Highest home attendance: ?
- Lowest home attendance: ?
Home colours	Away colours	Third colours

The 2009–10 season was the 46th season in Bursaspor's existence, and their 4th consecutive year in the top-flight of Turkish football, and covered the period from 1 July 2009 to 16 May 2010. The club, having finished 6th the previous season, missed out on a European place by just three points and hence did not play any competitive European games.

On 16 May 2010 Bursaspor won the Super Lig after beating defending champions Beşiktaş 2–1 at home. They won the league by just one point above second placed Fenerbahçe, although they had an 11-point gap over third placed Galatasaray. Their win ended 26 years of the "Istanbul Big Three" dominance.

Bursaspor had the strongest strikeforce and the second strongest defence, of all teams in the league. It was manager Ertuğrul Sağlam's first full season in charge having taken over in January 2009, and it was the first time he has won the league. It was quoted that they had a budget of only €10m, a tenth of the budget of the 'Istanbul Three' in Turkey, with Galatasaray having a budget of €125m.

Bursaspor are only the second club based outside of Istanbul to ever win the league title in the history of Turkish top-flight football. The other club was Trabzonspor, who last won the league in 2021/22.

== Season 2009–10 ==
Sağlam set his target for the club to finish the 2009–10 season in the top three and to play European football next season. In December 2009, the club were sitting (temporarily) in the top spot in the Süper Lig table for the first time that season, and the first time ever in their history.

The first half of the season saw a 1–0 home victory against Istanbul giants Galatasaray, and also a 2–3 win away at Besiktas. In late 2009, manager Sağlam was linked with the vacant Turkey managerial position after Fatih Terim's resignation, but he refused to comment on the speculation. Guus Hiddink eventually took up the position. The early part of the season saw a 6–0 win over midtable Istanbul B.B., the largest win in the league in the 2009–10 season, as well as coming from two goals down in the last ten minutes to beat Fenerbahce 2–3 away. In the Turkish Cup Bursaspor reached the quarter-finals but lost 4–3 on aggregate to Fenerbahce, after an injury time winner from Fener.

In April 2010 Bursa sat at the top of the table after floating around the top three since the beginning of the year. At one point during their stay at the summit they were 8 points above the second placed team. After securing a win by coming from behind to win 2–1 against Antalyaspor, after having lost the previous week for the first time in eight league games, Sağlam was quoted as saying that “We (Bursaspor) are on the verge of becoming a great team”, "we had to win, even if it meant coming from behind to do so. That was the important thing”.

Five weeks before the end of the season, Bursaspor fell to second place in the league. They maintained pressure on Fenerbahce who had overtaken them. Going into the final game of the season, Bursaspor were just one point behind Fener. Needing to better Fener's result, they won 2–1 at home against Beşiktaş. Fenerbahçe only managed a 1–1 home draw against Trabzonspor meaning that Bursaspor were crowned Champions, by just one point.

Bursa had the strongest strikeforce in the league as well as the second tightest defence; conceding just one more goal than Besiktas. The league positions of the club saw them outside of the top five on only four occasions and they stayed in the top three consecutively from December 2009 until they were crowned champions in May 2010, for 18 weeks.

They are only the fifth Champion of the Turkish league in its 52-year history.

== Team kit ==
The team kit for the 2009–10 season was produced by Puma and the shirt sponsor is Turkcell. The kit is the traditional green with green and white striped socks.

== Technical staff ==
Name	Role
(Turkey) Ertuğrul Sağlam	Manager
(Turkey) Mutlu Topçu	Assistant manager
	First team coach
	Head of Technical Analysis
	Head of Opponent Analysis
	Fitness coach

Name	Role
	Assistant Fitness coach
	Goalkeeping coach
	Chief scout
	Assistant Chief scout
	Club doctor
	Senior physiotherapist

== First-team squad ==
As of February 1, 2010. Note: Flags indicate national team as defined under FIFA eligibility rules; some limited exceptions apply. Players may hold more than one non-FIFA nationality.

No.	Pos.	Nation	Player
1	GK	(Turkey) TUR	Yavuz Özkan
2	DF	(Turkey) TUR	Serdar Aziz
4	DF	(Turkey) TUR	Ömer Erdoğan (captain)
5	MF	(Turkey) TUR	Hüseyin Çimşir
6	MF	(Turkey) TUR	Bekir Ozan Has
8	MF	(Romania) ROU	Giani Kiriţă
9	FW	(Turkey) TUR	Sercan Yıldırım
10	MF	(Turkey) TUR	Volkan Şen
11	MF	(Turkey) TUR	Eren Albayrak
17	MF	(Argentina) ARG	Pablo Batalla
19	FW	(Turkey) TUR	Isa Bagci
20	MF	(Turkey) TUR	Veli Acar
21	DF	(Turkey) TUR	Ali Tandoğan
22	FW	(Austria) AUT	Turgay Bahadır

No.	Pos.	Nation	Player
23	DF	(Turkey) TUR	Mustafa Keçeli
25	MF	(Serbia) SRB	Ivan Ergić
26	DF	(Czech Republic) CZE	Tomáš Zápotočný (on loan from Beşiktaş)
27	GK	(Bulgaria) BUL	Dimitar Ivankov
28	FW	(Argentina) ARG	Leonardo Iglesias
32	DF	(Turkey) TUR	Yenal Tuncer
33	MF	(Turkey) TUR	Ozan İpek
35	DF	(Turkey) TUR	Tuna Üzümcü
38	DF	(Turkey) TUR	İbrahim Öztürk
42	FW	(Turkey) TUR	Halil Zeybek
55	DF	(Turkey) TUR	Ramazan Sal
67	FW	(Turkey) TUR	Muhammet Demir
90	GK	(Turkey) TUR	Ceyhun Demircan

== Transfers ==
=== In ===
==== Winter Transfers 09/10 ====
As of February 1, 2010. Note: Flags indicate national team as defined under FIFA eligibility rules; some limited exceptions apply. Players may hold more than one non-FIFA nationality.

No.	Pos.	Nation	Player
—	FW	(Argentina) ARG	Leonardo Iglesias

=== Out ===
==== Winter Departure Players 09/10 ====
As of February 1, 2010. Note: Flags indicate national team as defined under FIFA eligibility rules; some limited exceptions apply. Players may hold more than one non-FIFA nationality.

No.	Pos.	Nation	Player
—	DF	(Turkey) TUR	Ramazan Sal to Giresunspor
—	MF	(Turkey) TUR	Cihan Kaptan to Dortmund II
—	FW	(South Korea) KOR	Shin Young-Rok to Tom Tomsk
—	FW	(Brazil) BRA	Tadeu to Barueri

=== Loaned in ===
Note: Flags indicate national team as defined under FIFA eligibility rules; some limited exceptions apply. Players may hold more than one non-FIFA nationality.

No.	Pos.	Nation	Player
26	DF	(Czech Republic) CZE	Tomáš Zápotočný (on loan from Beşiktaş)

=== Loaned out ===
Note: Flags indicate national team as defined under FIFA eligibility rules; some limited exceptions apply. Players may hold more than one non-FIFA nationality.

No.	Pos.	Nation	Player
—	MF	(Turkey) TUR	İsmail Özgür Göktaş (to Kasımpaşa)

For recent transfers, see List of Turkish football transfers 2008-09.

== Match results ==
=== League table ===
Pos	Team	Pld	W	D	L	GF	GA	GD	Pts	Qualification or relegation
1	Bursaspor (C)	34	23	6	5	65	26	+39	75	Qualification to Champions League group stage
2	Fenerbahçe	34	23	5	6	61	28	+33	74	Qualification to Champions League third qualifying round
3	Galatasaray	34	19	7	8	61	35	+26	64 (Note: Galatasaray finished ahead of Beşiktaş on head-to-head record: Galatasaray–Beşiktaş 3–0, Beşiktaş–Galatasaray 1–1.)	Qualification to Europa League third qualifying round
4	Beşiktaş	34	18	10	6	47	25	+22	64	Qualification to Europa League second qualifying round
5	Trabzonspor	34	16	9	9	53	32	+21	57	Qualification to Europa League play-off round (Note: Trabzonspor won the 2009–10 Turkish Cup and thus qualified for the play-off round of the UEFA Europa League.)

Source: Süper Lig official website
Rules for classification: 1st overall points, 2nd head-to-head points, 3rd head-to-head goal differential, 4th overall goal differential, 5th overall goals scored.
(C) Champions

=== Results by round ===
Round	1	2	3	4	5	6	7	8	9	10	11	12	13	14	15	16	17	18	19	20	21	22	23	24	25	26	27	28	29	30	31	32	33	34
Ground	H	A	H	A	H	A	H	A	A	H	A	H	A	H	A	H	A	A	H	A	H	A	H	A	H	H	A	H	A	H	A	H	A	H
Result	W	L	W	D	L	W	W	W	W	W	D	L	W	W	L	W	W	W	W	D	D	W	W	W	W	W	L	W	D	W	D	W	W	W
Position	5	9	4	6	11	7	4	3	3	2	3	4	4	3	5	4	3	3	3	3	3	2	2	1	1	1	1	1	1	1	2	2	2	1

Updated to match(es) played on 7 April 2010. Source: Süper Lig
A = Away; H = Home; W = Win; D = Draw; L = Loss

== Records ==
=== Doubles achieved ===
Opponent	Home result	Away result
Beşiktaş	2–1	3–2
Kasımpaşa	2–1	2–0
Sivasspor	3–0	3–1
Diyarbakırspor	4–0	3–0
Manisaspor	2–0	2–0
Denizlispor	2–1	3–2

=== Biggest winning margin ===
#	Opponent	H/A	Result	Competition
1	Istanbul BB	H	6–0	League
2	Diyarbakırspor	H	4–0	League
3	Sivasspor	H	4–0	Turkish Cup
