= Gökhan =

- Gender: Male
- Language: Turkish

Origin
- Language: Turkic
- Origin: gök + han
- Meaning: 'Ruler/Khan of Heaven'
- Region of origin: Turkey

Gökhan (Turkish pronunciation: [ɟœcˈhan]) is a Turkish forename meaning "ruler of the sky". The name comes from gök ('sky') and han, the Turkish equivalent of Khan.

Most likely, the first appearance of the name Gökhan is as one of the six sons of Oghuz Khagan, the legendary ruler of the Oghuz.

== Given name ==
Sports

- Gökhan Akkan, Turkish footballer
- Gökhan Alsan, Turkish footballer
- Gökhan Attaroğlu, Turkish swimmer
- Gökhan Bozkaya, Turkish footballer
- Gökhan Çalışal, Turkish-German footballer
- Gökhan Değirmenci, Turkish footballer
- Gökhan Emreciksin, Turkish footballer
- Gökhan Erdogan, Turkish footballer
- Gokhan Gokgoz, Turkish volleyball player
- Gökhan Gönül, Turkish international footballer
- Gökhan Gül, German footballer of Turkish origin
- Gökhan Güleç, Turkish footballer
- Gokhan Gumussu, Turkish footballer
- Gökhan Inler, Swiss-Turkish footballer
- Gökhan Karadeniz, Turkish footballer
- Gökhan Keskin, Turkish retired footballer
- Gökhan Kök, Turkish footballer
- Gökhan Öner, Turkish volleyball player
- Gökhan Saki, Turkish-Dutch martial artist
- Gökhan Tokgöz, Turkish footballer
- Gökhan Töre, Turkish international footballer
- Gökhan Ünal, Turkish international footballer
- Gökhan Yavaşer, Turkish freestyle wrestler
- Gökhan Zan, Turkish international footballer

Entertainment

- Gökhan Birben, Turkish singer and artist of Hamsheni descent.
- Gökhan Alkan, Turkish actor and singer
- Gökhan Keser, Turkish actor, model and singer
- Gökhan Kırdar, Turkish film score composer
- Gökhan Özen, Turkish singer songwriter
- Gökhan Özoğuz, Turkish ska punk singer from Athena

Sciences

- Gökhan Budak (1968–2013), Turkish professor of quantum physics
- Gökhan S. Hotamisligil, Turkish-American physician scientist

== Surname ==
- Serdar Gökhan (born 1946), Turkish actor

== See also ==
- MV Karadeniz Powership Gökhan Bey, a ship
