= Akyüz =

Akyüz is a Turkish surname. Notable people with the surname include:

- Janet Akyüz Mattei, Turkish-American Jewish astronomer
- Murat Akyüz, Turkish footballer
- Serhat Akyüz, Turkish footballer
