= Soysal =

Soysal is a Turkish surname. Notable people with the surname include:

- Ayşe Soysal, Turkish mathematician
- Mümtaz Soysal, Turkish professor of constitutional law, political scientist, Kemalist politician, human rights activist, ex-prisoner of conscience, senior advisor, columnist and author
- Yusuf Soysal, Turkish footballer
