= Sezgin =

- Gender: Male

Origin
- Language: Turkish
- Meaning: Insightful, capable of intuition

Other names
- Related names: Sezer

Sezgin is a common Turkish given name. In Turkish, "Sezgin" means "(someone) who is insightful" or "(someone) who is capable of intuition". The name is used as surname, as well.

== Given name ==
- Sezgin Ataç (born 1998), Turkish athlete
- Sezgin Güleç (born 1998), Dutch stand-up comedian and actor of Turkish descent
- Sezgin Coşkun (born 1984), Turkish football player
- Sezgin Baran Korkmaz (born 1977), Turkish businessman
- Sezgin Tanrıkulu (born 1963), Turkish lawyer and politician

== Surname ==
- Adnan Sezgin (born 1954), Turkish football player
- Aydın Adnan Sezgin (born 1956), Turkish diplomat and politician
- Ayşe Sezgin (born 1958), Turkish diplomat
- Fuat Sezgin (1924–2018), Turkish historian of Arabic-Islamic science
- İsmet Sezgin (1928–2016), Turkish politician
- Sezer Sezgin (born 1986), Turkish football player
- Bekir Sıtkı Sezgin (1936–1996), Turkish musician
- Hayri Sezgin (born 1961), Turkish wrestler

== See also ==
- Sezer (disambiguation)
