= İsmail Haktan Odabaşı =

Turkish footballer

Personal information
- Date of birth: 7 August 1991 (age 35)
- Place of birth: Konak, İzmir, Turkey
- Height: 1.78 m (5 ft 10 in)
- Position: Winger

Team information
- Current team: Sapanca Gençlikspor

Youth career
- 2005–2007: Balçovaspor
- 2007–2010: Bursaspor

Senior career*
| Years | Team | Apps | (Gls) |
| 2010–2013 | Bursaspor | 22 | (0) |
| 2012–2013 | → Denizlispor (loan) | 29 | (5) |
| 2013–2014 | Şanlıurfaspor | 16 | (4) |
| 2014–2015 | Boluspor | 48 | (7) |
| 2015–2016 | Gaziantepspor | 2 | (0) |
| 2016 | → Giresunspor (loan) | 10 | (0) |
| 2016 | Denizlispor | 6 | (0) |
| 2017–2018 | Manisaspor | 28 | (8) |
| 2018 | Denizlispor | 15 | (1) |
| 2018–2019 | Boluspor | 10 | (0) |
| 2019 | Manisa FK | 17 | (6) |
| 2020 | Hekimoğlu Trabzon | 14 | (2) |
| 2021 | Tuzlaspor | 1 | (0) |
| 2021 | Menemenspor | 10 | (3) |
| 2021–2022 | Afjet Afyonspor | 16 | (2) |
| 2022–2023 | 1461 Trabzon | 10 | (1) |
| 2023 | Eskişehirspor | 9 | (1) |
| 2023–2024 | Sapanca Gençlikspor | 1 | (0) |
| 2024–2025 | Bucaspor 1928 | 34 | (0) |

International career
| 2007 | Turkey U16 | 4 | (1) |
| 2007–2008 | Turkey U17 | 6 | (1) |
| 2009–2010 | Turkey U19 | 7 | (1) |
| 2010 | Turkey U20 | 2 | (0) |
| 2010–2012 | Turkey U21 | 3 | (1) |
| 2012–2013 | Turkey B | 6 | (0) |
- * Club domestic league appearances and goals as of 3 May 2025

İsmail Haktan Odabaşı (born 7 August 1991) is a Turkish professional footballer who plays as a right winger.

== Life and career ==
Odabaşı signed a youth contract with Balçovaspor in 2005. He was transferred to Bursaspor in 2007. As a player for Bursaspor A2, Odabaşı has scored 18 goals in 67 matches. He made his professional debut on 10 March 2010 against Kasımpaşa S.K. in the Süper Lig. Odabaşı featured in six more matches during the 2009–10 campaign, and was a part of the Bursaspor squad that won the 2009–10 Süper Lig.

Odabaşı has played internationally for the Turkey U-16, U-17, and U-19 squads. In 2009, he helped the U-19 squad qualify for the Elite Round of the 2009 UEFA European Under-19 Football Championship, scoring a goal against Germany in the final group stage match. The team progressed past the Elite Round, but finished last place in Group B of the finals.

== Honours ==
- Bursaspor
  - Süper Lig (1): 2009–10
