= Onarıcı =

Onarıcı is a Turkish surname. Notable people with the surname include:

- Berkay Onarıcı (born 1987), Turkish footballer
- Necmi Onarıcı (1925–1968), Turkish footballer
