= Gohan (disambiguation) =

Gohan or Son Gohan is a fictional character from the Dragon Ball series.

Gohan may also refer to:

- Gohan River, a tributary of the Olt River, Romania
- Gohan-eup, a town in Jeongseon, Gangwon Province, South Korea
- Grandpa Gohan, adopted grandfather of Goku in Dragon Ball
- Rice dishes (御飯) in Japanese cuisine
- Gal Gohan, a manga series
- Gohan (film), a 2026 Thai drama film

== See also ==
- Gökhan, a Turkish given name
