= Sezer =

- Gender: Male

Origin
- Language: Turkish
- Meaning: Good at Intuiting, (one who) Intuits

Other names
- Related names: Sezgin

Sezer is a common Turkish given name. In Turkish, "Sezer" means "(someone) who is good at intuition" or "(someone) who intuits". The name is used as a surname as well.

== Persons ==
Given name

- Sezer Badur, German footballer
- Sezer Huysuz, Turkish judoka
- Sezer Öztürk, Turkish footballer
- Sezer Sezgin, Turkish footballer

Surname

- Aidan Sezer, Australian rugby league footballer
- Ahmet Necdet Sezer, Turkish politician and 10th President of Turkey
- Melis Sezer, Turkish tennis player
- Sennur Sezer, Turkish poet, documentary writer
- Şafak Sezer, Turkish actor
- Zeki Sezer, Turkish politician
