= Gürhan =

Gürhan is a Turkish given name for males. Notable people with the name include:

- Gürhan Gürsoy (born 1987), Bulgarian-Turkish footballer
- Jamukha Gurkhan (born 1162), Mongol military and political leader and the chief rival to Temüjin
