= Mehmet Topuz =

Turkish footballer (born 1983)

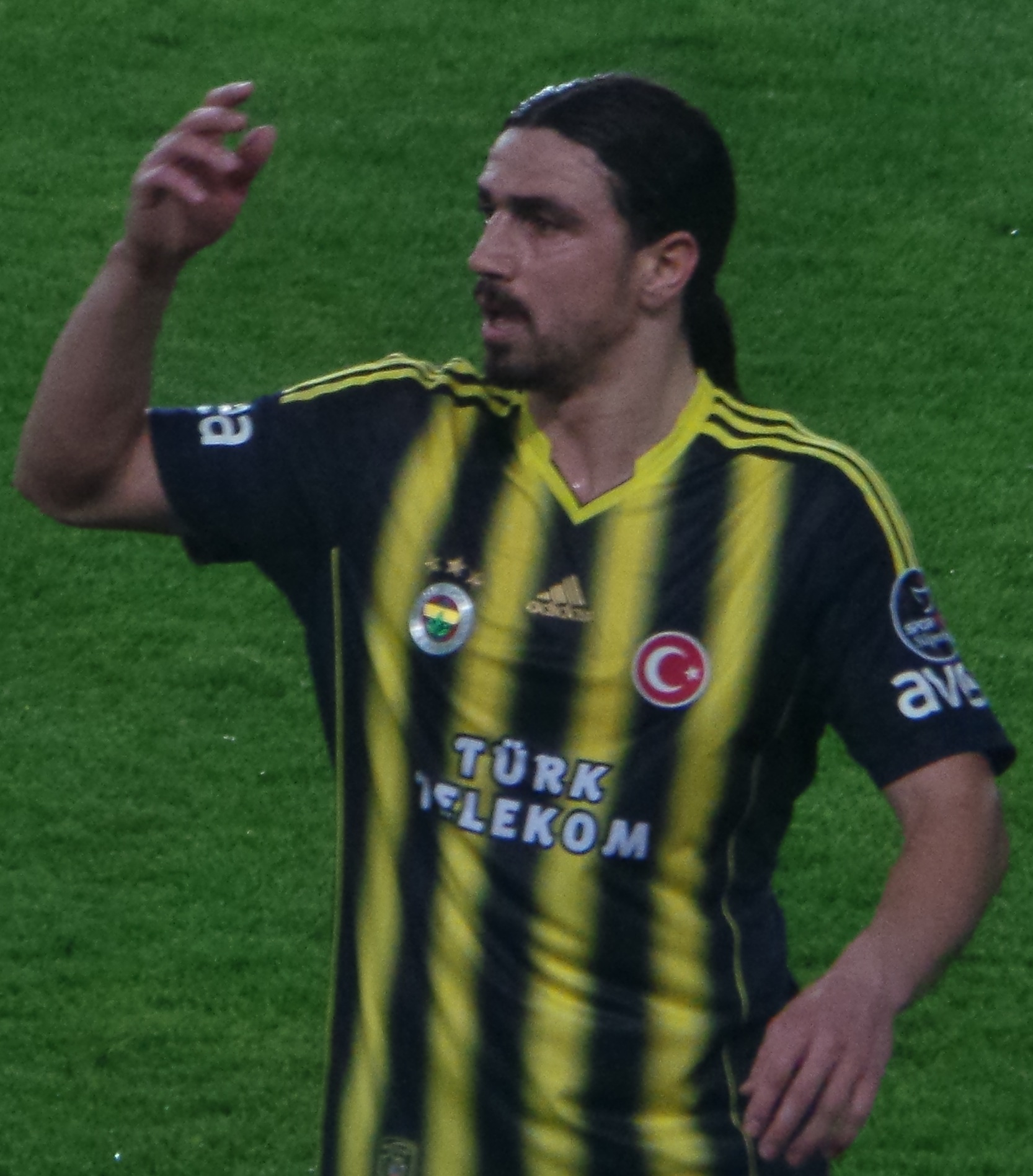
- Topuz with Fenerbahçe

Personal information
- Date of birth: 7 September 1983 (age 43)
- Place of birth: Caferli Köyü, Şefaatli, Yozgat, Turkey
- Height: 1.83 m (6 ft 0 in)
- Positions: Midfielder; right-back

Youth career
- 1999–2000: Kayseri Yolspor

Senior career*
Years	Team	Apps	(Gls)
2000–2009	Kayserispor	234	(46)
2009–2016	Fenerbahçe	151	(7)

International career^{‡}
2005–2006	Turkey U21	22	(2)
2006–2011	Turkey	16	(0)
- * Club domestic league appearances and goals ‡ National team caps and goals as of 19 December 2015

Mehmet Topuz (born 7 September 1983) is a Turkish former professional footballer who played as a midfielder or right-back for Kayserispor and Fenerbahçe.

== Club career ==
Topuz had begun his career in Yolspor, a local club located in Kayseri. He joined Kayserispor in 2000. He has been given several Golden Man of the Month awards which are presented monthly and supported by Turkey Heart Foundation. His performance at Süper Lig attracted the major clubs of Turkey. However, Kayserispor Board strongly asserted that they would not let him go and supported their intentions to keep him in the club by advertising on billboards. Afterwards, he extended his contract with the club, eventually becoming the team captain.

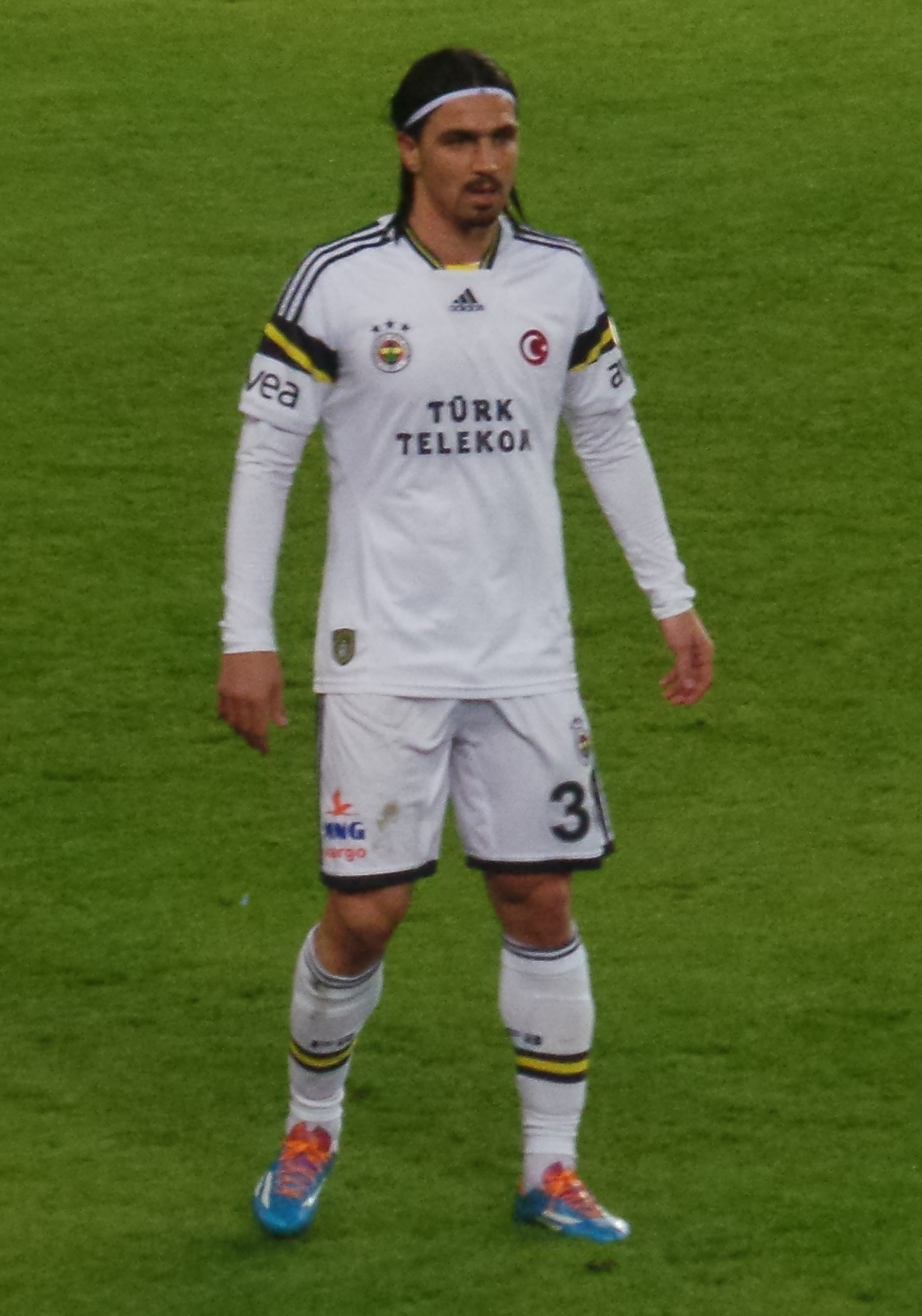
Topuz in 2013

He was linked with Spanish side Valencia in May 2008. He played total of six games for Kayserispor in European competitions and scored two goals during their UEFA Intertoto Cup campaign in the 2006 season, in which they became the first team from Turkey to win the competition. Kayserispor qualified for the UEFA Cup and lost 4–3 on aggregate against AZ in the second round. In 2007–08 season, he played two games in UEFA Cup qualification, in which Kayserispor lost against Paris Saint-Germain 2–1 on aggregate.

After playing five years for Kayserispor, he became one of the finest Turkish talents during his time and eventually moved to Turkish giants Fenerbahçe in 2009 for a fee of €9 million + Gökhan Emreciksin following a lengthy transfer battle with fellow rival giants Beşiktaş in which he wore the Beşiktaş jersey after agreeing terms with the club. However the transfer failed when Fenerbahçe secured the deal by arranging an agreement with his club Kayserispor, making him one of the most expensive internal Turkish transfers.

Topuz scored his first goal against Twente in the first group game of UEFA Europa League from a freekick at 71st minute. Although this game tied the score, Twente scored another goal six minutes later, and sealed a 2–1 win in Istanbul.

== International career ==
Topuz played 22 times for Turkey U21 national team and scored 2 goals. He represented the senior national team 18 times.

== Career statistics ==
Appearances and goals by club, season and competition
Club	Season	League		Cup (Note: Includes Turkish Cup, Turkish Super Cup)		Europe		Total	
Club	Season	Apps	Goals	Apps	Goals	Apps	Goals	Apps	Goals
Kayserispor	2000–01	10	1	1	0	—		11	1
Kayserispor	2001–02	11	0	0	0	—		11	0
Kayserispor	2002–03	22	3	1	0	—		23	3
Kayserispor	2003–04	29	10	1	1	—		30	11
Kayserispor	2004–05	34	3	4	0	—		38	3
Kayserispor	2005–06	32	3	7	1	—		39	4
Kayserispor	2006–07	32	8	5	1	8	2	45	11
Kayserispor	2007–08	33	9	10	4	—		43	13
Kayserispor	2008–09	28	9	6	5	2	0	36	14
Kayserispor	Total	234	46	34	12	10	2	276	60
Fenerbahçe	2009–10	28	1	6	2	8	1	42	4
Fenerbahçe	2010–11	34	1	1	0	2	0	37	1
Fenerbahçe	2011–12	33	3	4	0	—		37	3
Fenerbahçe	2012–13	22	1	9	0	13	0	44	1
Fenerbahçe	2013–14	24	0	2	0	3	0	29	0
Fenerbahçe	2014–15	7	1	8	2	0	0	15	3
Fenerbahçe	2015–16	3	0	8	1	0	0	11	1
Fenerbahçe	Total	151	7	38	5	0	0	215	13
Career total		385	53	72	16	36	3	491	73

=== International ===
Appearances and goals by national team and year
National team	Year	Apps	Goals
Turkey	2006	11	0
Turkey	2007	3	0
Turkey	2008	1	0
Turkey	2011	1	0
Total		16	0

== Honours ==
Kayserispor

- UEFA Intertoto Cup: 2006
- Türkiye Kupası: 2007–08

Fenerbahçe

- Süper Lig: 2010–11, 2013–14
- Türkiye Kupası: 2011–12, 2012–13
- Süper Kupa: 2009, 2014
