= Batuhan Karadeniz =

Turkish footballer (born 1991)

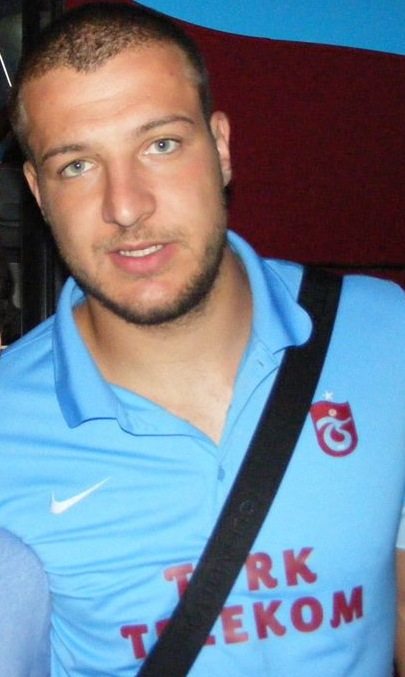
- Karadeniz in 2013

Personal information
- Date of birth: 24 April 1991 (age 35)
- Place of birth: Istanbul, Turkey
- Height: 1.92 m (6 ft 4 in)
- Position: Striker

Youth career
- 2001–2003: İçerenköy İdman Yurdu
- 2003–2007: Beşiktaş

Senior career*
Years	Team	Apps	(Gls)
2007–2010	Beşiktaş	14	(2)
2009	→ Eskişehirspor (loan)	14	(8)
2010–2013	Eskişehirspor	58	(15)
2012	→ Beşiktaş (loan)	11	(0)
2013–2014	Trabzonspor	2	(0)
2014	→ Elazığspor (loan)	11	(3)
2014–2016	Sivasspor	35	(7)
2016	FC St. Gallen	7	(0)
2016–2017	Şanlıurfaspor	23	(8)
2017–2018	Sakaryaspor	22	(12)
2018	Adana Demirspor	6	(0)
2019	Bandırmaspor	27	(20)
2020	Tuzlaspor	11	(8)
2020–2021	Hekimoğlu Trabzon	35	(26)
2021–2022	Iğdır FK	29	(16)
2022	Vanspor FK	10	(1)

International career^{‡}
2006	Turkey U15	2	(0)
2006–2007	Turkey U16	26	(25)
2007	Turkey U17	28	(18)
2008	Turkey U21	1	(2)
2008–2009	Turkey	2	(0)
- * Club domestic league appearances and goals as of 19 October 2022 ‡ National team caps and goals as of 3 August 2022

Batuhan Karadeniz (born 24 April 1991) is a former Turkish professional footballer.

Started his career at İçerenköy Spor Kulübü at the age of 10, Karadeniz rose to fame at Süper Lig club Beşiktaş, where he played in youth levels between 2003 and 2007, and made his Süper Lig debut in the 2007-08 Season. He was also the youngest scorer of Süper Lig, scoring at the age of 16. Having disciplinary issues, Karadeniz left Beşiktaş in 2010 and played at Süper Lig level until the end of 2015–16, played at Eskişehirspor, Trabzon, Elazığspor and, Sivasspor. The following years he was rather a journey man, spending each and every season in different teams other than Bandırmaspor. A highly demanded player, he played in TFF First League and Second League play-offs between 2017 and 2022 in 4 different teams during his spells.

Being a prolific forward in youth levels, Karadeniz would represent Turkey only on two occasions, called up by Fatih Terim, between 2008 and 2009.

== Club career ==
=== 2003–2010: Beşiktaş J.K. ===
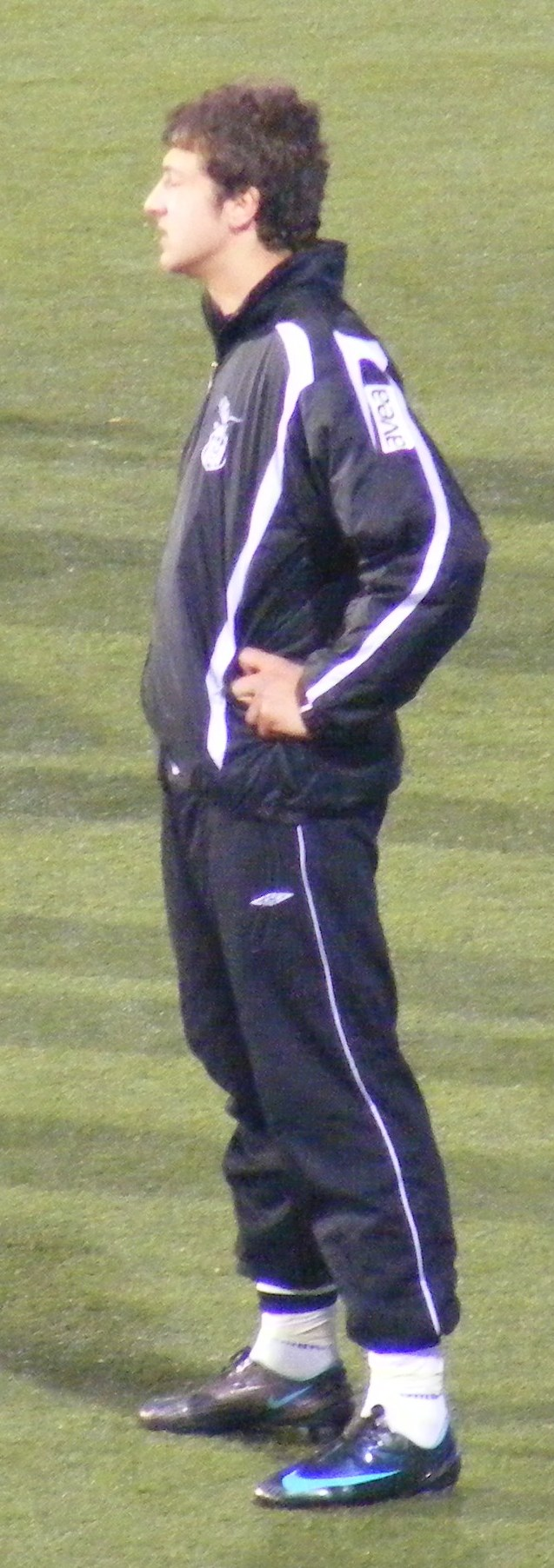
Karadeniz, at the age of 17, in 2008 while playing professional level at Beşiktaş

Karadeniz was regarded as a prospect player, scoring 226 goals in 86 matches at youth levels. His youth performance pulled attention of various clubs across European leagues.

In 2006, he signed a professional contract with Beşiktaş J.K. At his professional season, he made his Super League debut against another Istanbul team Kasımpaşa on the 2nd matchday of the Turkish Football League 2007-08 Season as he had been substituted on for Burak Yılmaz at half time, making made him the youngest player ever to appear in a Süper Lig game at the age of just 16 years and 115 days. Just 6 days later, he scored his first goal for Beşiktaş on 25 August against Gaziantepspor in the 95th minute and made a big contribution to his team's 3 points. Karadeniz became the youngest scorer ever at Süper Lig at the age of 16.

He made his UEFA Champions League debut against FC Zürich, making a substitute appearance in the 92nd minute, replacing Mert Nobre on 29 August 2007, where game ended 2–0 for Beşiktaş.

On 3 November 2007, Karadeniz came on as a substitute for Koray Avci in the 83rd minute against Fenerbahçe S.K. He missed a very crucial chance for Kara Kartallar during the additional time (90+3) as he picked up a loose ball and faked the keeper Volkan Demirel, subsequently he tried to shoot despite having had two teammates unmarked by his side and in the end he could not generate enough power on his shot and Edu cleared the ball away. Beşiktas lost the game with a final score of 2–1 to Fenerbahçe, who overtook Beşiktaş by one point. Later, he said "You [must] be the king, you don't make someone else the king". Although he was criticized by the Turkish press that he should have assisted Federico Higuaín in the match, he stated that he had not seen his teammate at the time.

During the January 2008 transfer window Beşiktaş wanted to loan him out to F.C. Köln for him to get more playing time, however the transfer did not take place due to FIFA rules for each football federation regarding age. According to the German Football Association, Karadeniz was classed as a minor and thus could not be transferred as he had a professional contract.

=== 2010– : Later career ===
Karadeniz was loaned out Eskişehirspor during the January 2009 transfer window. He started his loan scoring four goals in three league matches.

At the end of the 2008–09 season, Karadeniz had an operation on his left shoulder, ruling him out of football for five weeks. In the summer transfer window of 2010, Karadeniz moved to Eskişehirspor on a permanent deal. Then, he was loaned again to Beşiktaş. At the end of his contract he signed a new deal with Trabzonspor. After playing half of the season with Trabzonspor, he was loaned to Elazığspor. At the end of the season Trabzonspor terminated his contract. Before the beginning of the 2014–15 season he signed a new contract with Sivasspor.

On 16 July 2019, Karadeniz reagreed terms to extended his contract Balıkesirspor. Karadeniz scored twice at 9th week fixtures of 2018–19 TFF Second League Red Group game in which Balıkesirspor beat Niğde Belediyespor on 4–1 final score.

He joined Vanspor FK in the TFF Second League for the 2022–23 season. On 15 October 2022, his contract with Vanspor was terminated by mutual consent.

== International career ==
Karadeniz has risen through the ranks of the Turkish national teams. At the Under-16 and Under-17 levels, he scored a total of 43 goals in 53 matches. At age 17 he was called up to the Turkish Under-21 squad to play in the U-21 European Championships qualifiers, making him the youngest player in the team.

He was first called up to the senior Turkish team by Fatih Terim during Turkey's 2010 world Cup Qualifiers in October 2008. He made his senior debut on 11 October 2008, winning his first cap in the Group 5 game against Bosnia & Herzegovina.

When he was only 18 years old, he was named as part of the squad for Turkey's friendly matches against the Ivory Coast in February 2009 but was an unused substitute. While playing at Sivasspor in August 2015, he was called-up on national team once again by Fatih Terim, up against UEFA Euro 2016 qualifying Group A encounters against Latvia and Netherlands.

== Playing style ==
Standing at nearly two metres tall, Karadeniz is noted for his aerial presence. He is capable of playing on the wings, in midfield, or as a second striker.

== Statistics ==
=== Club ===
As of 3 August 2022

Appearances and goals by club, season and competition
Club	Season	League			Cup (Note: Includes Turkish Cup and Swiss Cup)		Continental (Note: Includes UEFA Champions League and UEFA Europa League.)		Other (Note: Includes Turkish Super Cup, TFF Second League and TFF Third League promotion play-offs.)		Total	
Club	Season	Division	Apps	Goals	Apps	Goals	Apps	Goals	Apps	Goals	Apps	Goals
Beşiktaş	2007–08	Süper Lig	11	1	4	0	2	0	0	0	17	1
Beşiktaş	2008–09	Süper Lig	3	1	0	0	1	0	—		4	1
Beşiktaş	2009–10	Süper Lig	0	0	0	0	1	0	0	0	1	0
Beşiktaş	Total		14	2	4	0	4	0	0	0	22	2
Eskişehirspor (loan)	2008–09	Süper Lig	14	8	1	0	—		—		15	8
Eskişehirspor	2010–11	Süper Lig	25	7	0	0	—		—		25	7
Eskişehirspor	2011–12	Süper Lig	27	3	4	2	—		6 (Note: Appearances at Süper Lig Europa League qualification group)	5	37	10
Eskişehirspor	2012–13	Süper Lig	0	0	0	0	1	0	—		1	0
Eskişehirspor	Total		52	10	4	2	1	0	6	5	63	17
Beşiktaş (loan)	2012–13	Süper Lig	11	0	4	1	— (Note: Finishing 2011–12 Süper Lig in the fourth-place, Beşiktaş have been disqualified by UEFA from competing in the 2012–13 UEFA Europa League, due to incompliance with UEFA Financial Fair Play Regulations.)		—		15	1
Trabzonspor	2013–14	Süper Lig	2	0	0	0	2	0	—		4	0
Elazığspor (loan)	2013–14	Süper Lig	11	3	1	1	—		—		12	4
Sivasspor	2014–15	Süper Lig	31	6	8	4	—		—		39	10
Sivasspor	2015–16	Süper Lig	4	1	1	0	—		—		5	1
Sivasspor	Total		35	7	9	4	—		—		44	11
St. Gallen	2015–16	Swiss Super League	7	0	0	0	—		—		7	0
Şanlıurfaspor	2016–17	TFF First League	23	8	6	3	—		—		29	11
Sakaryaspor	2017–18	TFF Second League	18	7	0	0	—		4 (Note: Appearances at 2017–18 TFF Second League promotion play-offs semi-finals and final)	5	22	12
Adana Demirspor	2017–18	TFF First League	6	0	2	1	—		—		8	1
Bandırmaspor	2018–19	TFF Second League	14	11	0	0	—		—		14	11
Bandırmaspor	2019–20	TFF Second League	13	9	1	1	—		—		14	10
Bandırmaspor	Total		27	20	1	1	—		—		28	21
Tuzlaspor	2019–20	TFF Second League	8	5	0	0	—		3 (Note: Appearances at 2019–20 TFF Second League promotion play-offs quarter-finals, semi-finals and final)	3	11	8
Hekimoğlu Trabzon	2020–21	TFF Second League	32	24	2	3	—		3 (Note: Appearances at 2020–21 TFF Second League promotion play-offs quarter-finals and semi-finals)	2	37	29
Iğdır F.K.	2021–22	TFF Third League	26	16	1	0	—		3 (Note: Appearances at 2021–22 TFF Third League promotion play-offs semi-finals and final)	0	30	16
Vanspor FK	2022–23	TFF Second League	0	0	0	0	—		0	0	0	0
Career total			286	110	35	16	7	0	19	15	347	141

=== International ===
As of 11 October 2021

National team	Season	Apps	Goals
Turkey
Turkey	2008	1	0
Turkey	2009	1	0
Total		2	0
