= Yusuf Soysal =

Turkish footballer

Personal information
- Date of birth: 26 April 1982 (age 44)
- Place of birth: Frankfurt, Germany
- Height: 1.93 m (6 ft 4 in)
- Position: Goalkeeper

Senior career*
Years	Team	Apps	(Gls)
1998–2000	Gençlerbirliği		
2001–2002	Gençlerbirliği OFTAŞ		
2002–2004	Uşakspor		
2004–2005	Eskişehirspor		
2005–2008	Kayseri Erciyesspor	31	(0)
2008–2011	Kayserispor		
2011–2012	İskenderun Demir Çelikspor		
- * Club domestic league appearances and goals

Yusuf Soysal (born 26 April 1982) is a Turkish former football goalkeeper. Has been capped one time for the Turkey U-16 against Qatar on August 27, 1998 and conceded 2 goals

Soysal transferred to Kayseri Erciyesspor from Eskişehirspor in August 2005. He has played 2 league matches for Kayseri Erciyesspor in the Turkish Süper Lig during the 2005–06 season.,
