= Sancak Kaplan =

Turkish footballer

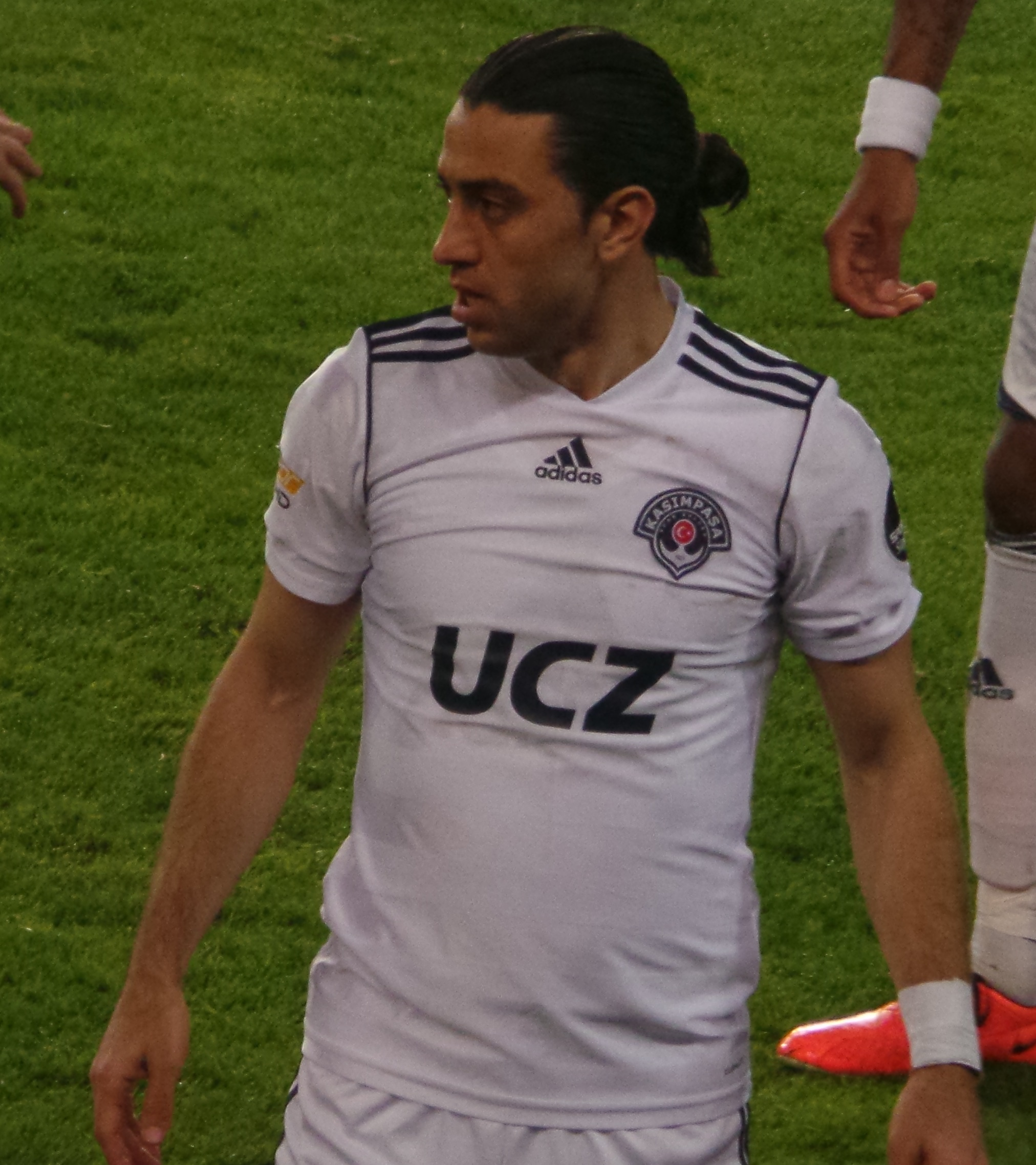

Personal information
- Date of birth: 25 May 1982 (age 44)
- Place of birth: Erzurum, Turkey
- Height: 1.80 m (5 ft 11 in)
- Position: Defender

Senior career*
Years	Team	Apps	(Gls)
2002–2004	Malatyaspor	8	(0)
2004	→ Adanaspor (loan)	12	(1)
2004–2005	Adanaspor	24	(0)
2005–2007	Altay	62	(2)
2007–2009	İstanbul B.B.	12	(0)
2009–2015	Kasımpaşa	156	(2)
- * Club domestic league appearances and goals

Sancak Kaplan (born 25 May 1982) is a Turkish former professional footballer who played as a defender.
