= Tayfur Emre Yılmaz =

Turkish footballer

Tayfur Emre Yılmaz (born 26 February 1989 in Babaeski) is a Turkish professional footballer who plays as a striker for Buca FK.

He formerly played for Malatyaspor, Sivasspor and Göztepe. Yılmaz appeared in nine TFF First League matches for Malatyaspor during the 2007–08 season.
