= Edim Demir =

Turkish footballer

Personal information
- Full name: Edim Demir
- Date of birth: 25 August 1985 (age 41)
- Place of birth: Silifke, Turkey
- Height: 1.85 m (6 ft 1 in)
- Position: Forward

Senior career*
Years	Team	Apps	(Gls)
2004–2007	Usakspor	23	(2)
2007	Hacettepespor	4	(0)
2007–2008	İskenderun DÇ	27	(8)
2008–2012	Boluspor	33	(15)
2013–2015	Körfez İskenderunspor	40	(6)
- * Club domestic league appearances and goals as of 3 May 2015

Edim Demir (born 25 August 1985) is a Turkish former professional footballer who played as a forward.

== Career ==
Demir was born in Silifke, Turkey. His contract with Boluspor started on 25 August 2008 and is scheduled to end in May 2011, but was then extended by one year.
