= Gökhan Öztürk =

Turkish footballer

Personal information
- Date of birth: March 22, 1990 (age 36)
- Place of birth: Büyükçekmece, Istanbul, Turkey
- Height: 1.79 m (5 ft 10 in)
- Position: Midfielder

Team information
- Current team: Tepecikspor
- Number: 90

Youth career
- 2000–2001: Tepecikspor
- 2001–2008: Galatasaray

Senior career*
Years	Team	Apps	(Gls)
2008–2009	Galatasaray A2	?	(?)
2009–2012	Gaziantepspor	8	(0)
2011–2012	→ Çaykur Rizespor (loan)	6	(0)
2012–2014	Tavşanlı Linyitspor	13	(0)
2014	Altınordu	3	(0)
2014–2015	Tepecikspor	10	(0)
2015–2016	Bayrampaşaspor	34	(1)
2016–2018	Anadolu Selçukspor	36	(1)
2018–2019	Ankara Demirspor	2	(0)
2019–	Tepecikspor	2	(0)
- * Club domestic league appearances and goals as of 19:27, 8 May 2019 (UTC)

Gökhan Öztürk (born 22 March 1990) is a Turkish professional footballer who currently plays as a midfielder for Tepecikspor. He was also a youth international.

== Career ==
Öztürk began his career with Tepecikspor in 2000. Galatasaray transferred the midfielder in 2001. He was trained in the Galatasaray youth system and was transferred to Gaziantepspor in 2009.
