= MV Karadeniz Powership Gökhan Bey =

Karadeniz Powership Gökhan Bey
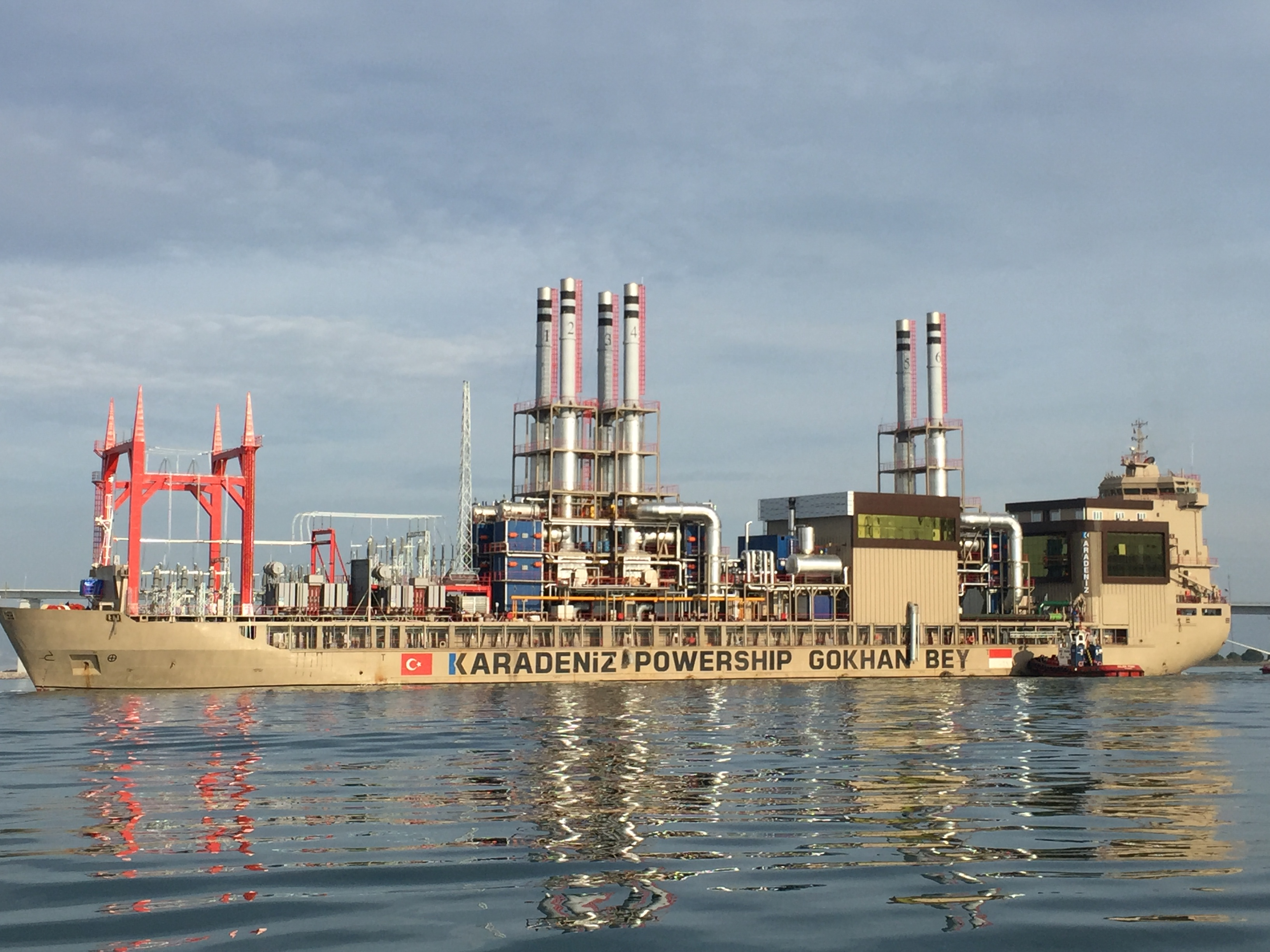
- Karadeniz Powership Gökhan Bey

History

Liberia
- Name: KPS Gökhan Bey; HR Indication (2014–2016); HHL Indication (2013–2014); HR Indication (2011–2013); Beluga Indication (2007–2011); Nirint Iberia (2007); Beluga Indication (2007); Nirint Iberia (2006–2007); Beluga Indication (2004–2006); Cec Apollon (2000–2004)
- Owner: Karpowership
- Operator: Karpowership
- Builder: Dalian Shipbuilding Industry Company, Dalian, Liaoning, China
- Completed: 2000
- Homeport: Monrovia
- Identification: Call sign: D5BY7, IMO number: 9214563, MMSI number: 636016857

General characteristics
- Class & type: Special Service-Floating Power Plant; formerly Bulk cargo
- Tonnage: 11,130 GT; 11,934 DWT
- Length: 162.10 m (531 ft 10 in) (LOA)
- Beam: 20.40 m (66 ft 11 in)
- Capacity: 125 MW generation (as Powership)

MV Karadeniz Powership Gökhan Bey is Liberia-flagged floating power plant, owned and operated by Karpowership. In 2016, she was solemnly sent off from the Sedef Shipyard in Tuzla, Istanbul, Turkey together with the MV Karadeniz Powership Yasin Bey to Indonesia to supply electricity to the power grid. She has a generation capacity of 125 MW.

== Cargo ship ==
The ship was built in 2000 as a general cargo carrier by Dalian Shipbuilding Industry Company in Dalian, Liaoning, China. The 162.10 m (531 ft 10 in) long vessel has a beam of 20.40 m (66 ft 11 in). By 11,934 DWT, she has a cargo capacity of 11,130 GT.

== Powership ==
The Turkish company Karpowership purchased the general cargo ship. She was converted into a Powership at Sedef Shipyard in Tuzla, Istanbul, and renamed MV Karadeniz Powership Gökhan Bey with a generation capacity of 120 MW. On November 13, 2016, the Powership sailed to Indonesia in a ceremony attended by the President Recep Tayyip Erdoğan, Prime Minister Binali Yıldırım, Minister of Transport, Maritime and Communication Ahmet Arslan and other officials. She was commissioned to supply electricity to the power grid in Indonesia.

== Ship's registry ==
- ex-MV HR Indication (2014–2016), owned by Hammonia Reederei, Hamburg, Germany
- ex-MV HHL Indication (2013–2014)
- ex-MV HR Indication (2011–2013)
- ex-MV Beluga Indication (2007–2011)
- ex-MV Nirint Iberia (2007)
- ex-MV Beluga Indication (2007)
- ex-MV Nirint Iberia (2006–2007)
- ex-MV Beluga Indication (2004–2006)
- ex-MV Cec Apollon (2000–2004)
