= İbrahim Ege =

Turkish footballer

Personal information
- Date of birth: 3 February 1983 (age 43)
- Place of birth: Erzurum, Turkey
- Height: 1.74 m (5 ft 9 in)
- Position: Defender

Team information
- Current team: Galatasaray

Youth career
- 1999–2001: Erzurumspor

Senior career*
Years	Team	Apps	(Gls)
2001–2003	Erzurumspor	28	(2)
2003–2006	Trabzonspor	36	(2)
2006–2007	Denizlispor	31	(1)
2007–2009	Ankaragücü	32	(0)
2009–2010	Diyarbakırspor	0	(0)
2010–2011	Konyaspor	4	(0)
2011	Mersin İdmanyurdu	0	(0)

International career
2003	Turkey U20	1	(0)
2004	Turkey U21	1	(0)
- * Club domestic league appearances and goals as of August 25, 2011

İbrahim Ege (born 3 February 1983 in Erzurum) is a Turkish retired football player, who played as a defender.

== Honours ==
=== Club ===
Trabzonspor

- Turkish Cup: 2003–04
