= Abdulaziz Solmaz =

Turkish footballer

Abdülaziz Solmaz
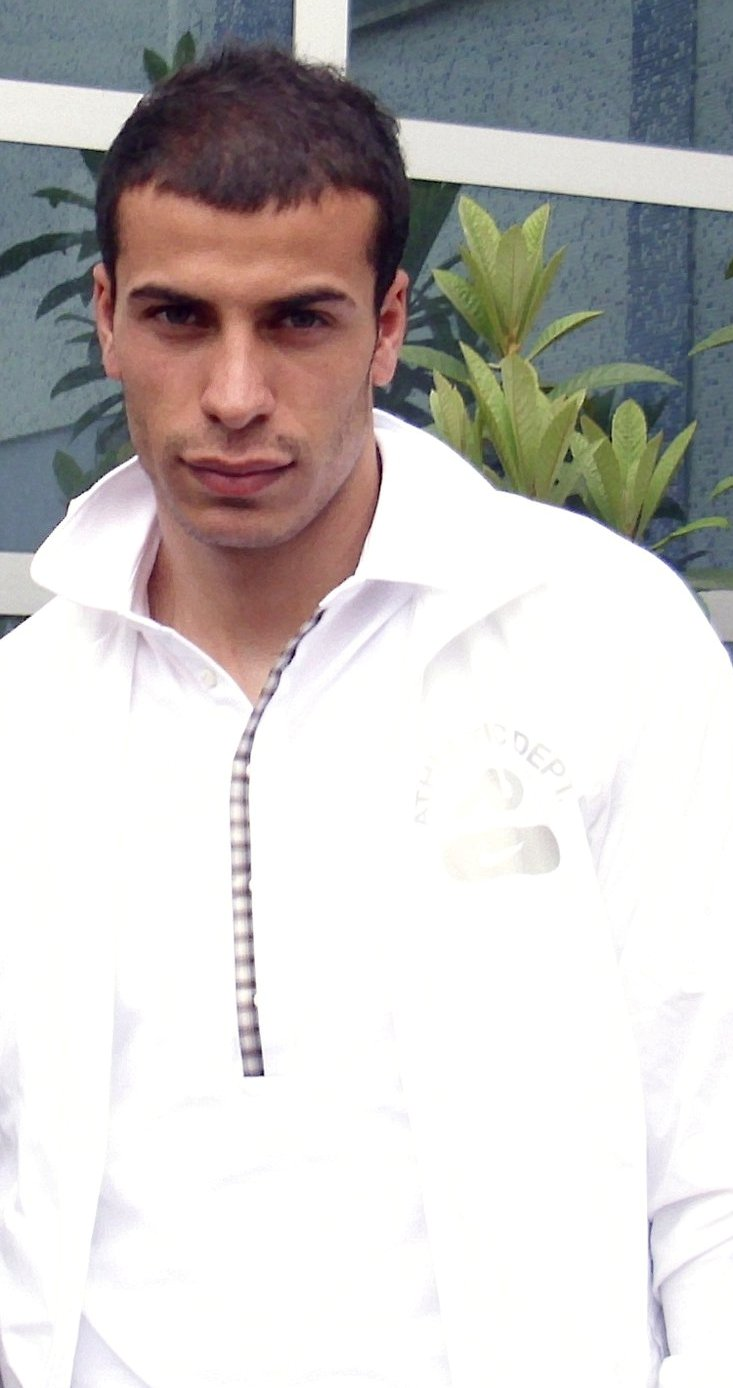

Personal information
- Date of birth: 7 August 1988 (age 38)
- Place of birth: Araklı, Turkey
- Height: 1.77 m (5 ft 10 in)
- Position: Winger

Senior career*
Years	Team	Apps	(Gls)
2006–2007	Trabzonspor	0	(0)
2007–2008	Pazarspor	32	(5)
2008–2009	Ankaragücü	2	(0)
2009–2011	Samsunspor	45	(4)
2011–2014	Eskişehirspor	5	(0)
2012–2013	→ Boluspor (loan)	29	(4)
2014	İstanbul Başakşehir	3	(0)
2014–2016	Giresunspor	56	(10)
2016–2017	Şanlıurfaspor	33	(7)
2017–2018	Adanaspor	25	(1)
2018–2019	Kastamonuspor 1966	33	(10)
2019–2021	Sakaryaspor	62	(9)
2021–2022	Dıyarbakır Spor	12	(1)
2022	Iğdır	12	(1)
2022–2024	Kastamonuspor 1966	26	(5)

International career
2005	Turkey U17	3	(0)
2005–2006	Turkey U18	2	(0)
2011	Turkey A2	3	(1)
- * Club domestic league appearances and goals

Abdülaziz Solmaz (born 7 August 1988) is a Turkish former footballer. He made his Süper Lig debut on 24 January 2009.
