= Berkay Onarıcı =

Turkish footballer (born 1987)

Berkay Onarıcı (born 10 July 1987, in Eskişehir) is a Turkish professional footballer who last played as an attacking midfielder for Mihalgazispor.

Onarıcı played in nine matches for Eskişehirspor in the TFF First League during the 2007–08 season.
