= Ramazan Sal =

Turkish footballer

Personal information
- Date of birth: 27 June 1985 (age 41)
- Place of birth: Samsun, Turkey
- Height: 1.87 m (6 ft 2 in)
- Position: Centre-back

Youth career
- 1999–2001: Trabzon Karadenizspor
- 2001–2003: Atakum Belediyespor
- 2003–2004: Samsunspor
- 2004–2005: Tekkeköy Belediyespor

Senior career*
Years	Team	Apps	(Gls)
2005–2006	Hatayspor	6	(0)
2006	Muğlaspor	2	(0)
2006–2007	İnegölspor	20	(0)
2007–2008	Samsunspor	14	(0)
2008–2009	Pendikspor	33	(4)
2009–2012	Bursaspor	4	(0)
2010	→ Giresunspor (loan)	14	(1)
2010–2011	→ Boluspor (loan)	29	(4)
2012–2013	Şanlıurfaspor	28	(2)
2013	Göztepe	12	(1)
2013–2014	Osmanlıspor	5	(0)
2014–2015	Karşıyaka	25	(4)
2015–2016	Boluspor	14	(1)
2016–2017	Şanlıurfaspor	23	(2)
2017	Boluspor	16	(1)
2017–2018	Sakaryaspor	21	(1)
2018–2020	52 Orduspor	22	(1)
Total		264	(22)
- * Club domestic league appearances and goals

Ramazan Sal (born 27 June 1985) is a Turkish former professional footballer who played as a centre-back.
