= Uğur Kapısız =

Turkish footballer

Uğur Kapisiz
Personal information
- Date of birth: May 9, 1987 (age 39)
- Place of birth: Uzunköprü, Turkey
- Height: 1.77 m (5 ft 10 in)
- Position: Central midfielder

Team information
- Current team: Edirnespor

Youth career
- 2004: Kırcasalihspor

Senior career*
| Years | Team | Apps | (Gls) |
| 2005–2008 | Beykoz 1908 | 59 | (7) |
| 2008–2010 | Gençlerbirliği | 2 | (0) |
| 2009–2010 | → Balıkesirspor (loan) | 25 | (2) |
| 2010–2013 | Denizli Belediyespor | 48 | (2) |
| 2013–2014 | Edirnespor Genclik | 21 | (8) |
| 2014–2016 | Tekirdağspor | 51 | (4) |
| 2016–2019 | Edirnespor | 24 | (11) |
| 2019–2020 | Yalovaspor | 0 | (0) |
| 2020– | Edirnespor | 0 | (0) |
- * Club domestic league appearances and goals as of 15 March 2020

Uğur Kapisiz (born 9 May 1987, in Uzunköprü, Turkey) is a Turkish footballer who currently plays as a midfielder for Edirnespor.
