= Halil Zeybek =

Turkish footballer

Personal information
- Date of birth: 23 August 1985 (age 41)
- Place of birth: Üsküdar, Istanbul, Turkey
- Height: 1.73 m (5 ft 8 in)
- Position: Right winger

Youth career
- 1996–2000: Fenerbahçe
- 2000–2004: Kartalspor

Senior career*
| Years | Team | Apps | (Gls) |
| 2004–2007 | Kartalspor | 28 | (3) |
| 2007–2008 | Erzurumspor | 35 | (15) |
| 2008–2012 | Bursaspor | 5 | (0) |
| 2009–2010 | → Giresunspor (loan) | 12 | (0) |
| 2010 | → Çaykur Rizespor (loan) | 8 | (0) |
| 2010–2011 | → Diyarbakırspor (loan) | 13 | (1) |
| 2011 | → Göztepe S.K. (loan) | 13 | (3) |
| 2011–2012 | → Turgutluspor (loan) | 26 | (5) |
| 2012–2014 | Yeni Malatyaspor | 43 | (5) |
| 2014–2016 | Hatayspor | 39 | (4) |
| 2016–2018 | Nazilli Belediyespor | 28 | (4) |
| 2018–2019 | Halide Edip Adıvar | 21 | (0) |
- * Club domestic league appearances and goals as of 23:00, 25 June 2019 (UTC)

Halil Zeybek (born 23 August 1985) is a Turkish professional footballer who most recently played as a right winger for Halide Edip Adıvar SK.
