= Murat Akyüz =

Turkish footballer (born 1981)

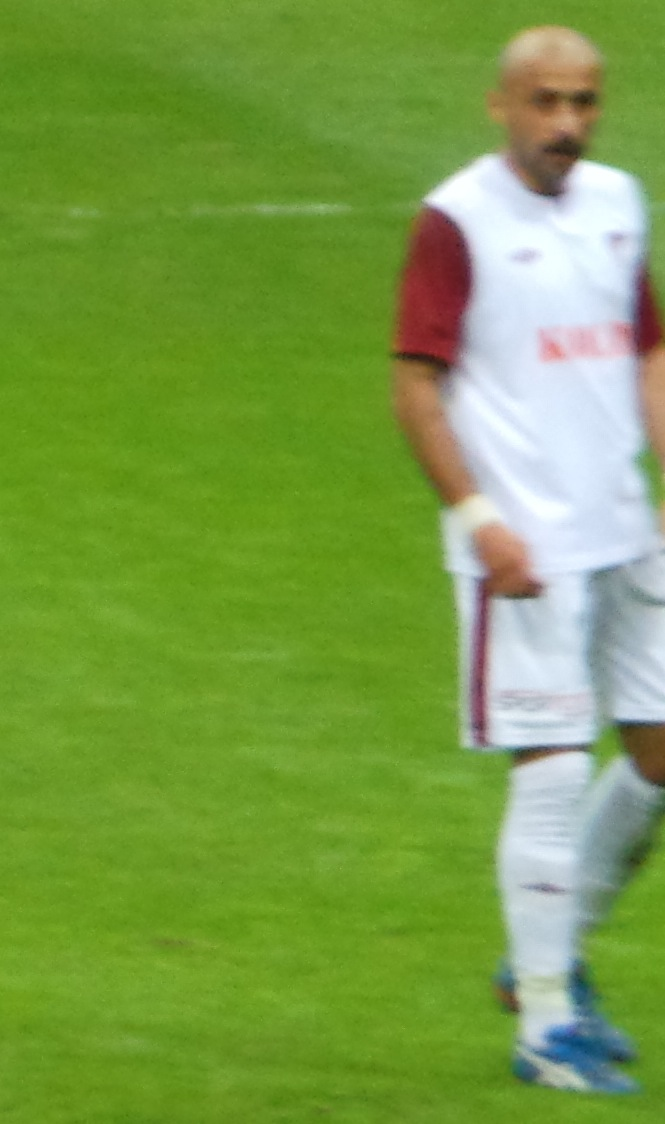
- Murat Akyüz (2013)

Personal information
- Date of birth: 13 August 1981 (age 45)
- Place of birth: Bakırköy, Turkey
- Height: 1.79 m (5 ft 10 1/2 in)
- Position: Fullback

Senior career*
Years	Team	Apps	(Gls)
2001–2002	Alibeyköy	29	(0)
2002–2004	Kartalspor	55	(12)
2004–2006	Kayseri Erciyesspor	42	(0)
2006–2010	Ankaraspor	6	(0)
2010–2011	Denizlispor	11	(0)
2011–2013	Karşıyaka	21	(0)
2013	Elazığspor	6	(0)
2013–2015	Samsunspor	62	(2)
2015–2016	Elazığspor	15	(0)
2016	Adana Demirspor	15	(0)
2016–2018	Bucaspor	47	(2)
2018–2019	Vefa		
- * Club domestic league appearances and goals

Murat Akyüz (born 13 August 1981) is a Turkish former football player who played as a fullback.

== Career ==
On 6 January 2016, he was released by Elazığspor and joined Adana Demirspor on 9 January 2016 on a two-year contract. On 14 June 2016, he terminated his contract and became a free agent.

On 31 August 2016, he joined Bucaspor on a one-year contract.
