= Özgür Bayer =

Turkish footballer

Personal information
- Full name: Özgür Bayer
- Date of birth: 4 April 1979 (age 47)
- Place of birth: Balıkesir, Turkey
- Height: 1.79 m (5 ft 10 1/2 in)
- Position: Central defender

Senior career*
Years	Team	Apps	(Gls)
1997–1998	S. Linyitspor	–	(–)
1998–1999	Beylerbeyi	–	(–)
1999–2000	S. Linyitspor	–	(–)
2000–2002	Yimpaş Yozgatspor	29	(0)
2002–2005	Denizlispor	67	(0)
2005–2006	Trabzonspor	10	(0)
2006	Ankaraspor	16	(1)
2006–2007	Kayseri Erciyesspor	23	(0)
2007–2008	Gaziantepspor	8	(0)
2008	Kocaelispor	4	(0)
2008–2009	Ankaragücü	12	(0)
2009–2010	Giresunspor	26	(0)
2010–2011	Boluspor	26	(1)
2011–2012	Karşıyaka	20	(2)
2012	Denizlispor	3	(0)
2013	Adanaspor	3	(0)

International career
2004	Turkey A2	3	(0)
- * Club domestic league appearances and goals

Özgür Bayer (born 4 April 1979 in Balıkesir, Turkey) is a Turkish former football player.
