= Körfez İskenderunspor =

- Full name: Körfez İskenderunspor
- Founded: 1991 (Club Code :010659)
- Ground: 5 Temmuz Stadium, Iskenderun
- Capacity: 12,390
- Chairman: Kazım Aydın
- Manager: Ramazan Silin
- League: Hatay Amateur Leagues
- 2016–17: Turkish Regional Amateur League-5th group 13th place (Relegated)
- Website: http://idcspor.org
Home colours	Away colours

Korfez İskenderunspor is a sports club located in Iskenderun, Hatay Province, Turkey. The football club plays in the Hatay Amateur Leagues.

== Previous names ==
- İskenderun Demir Çelikspor (1984–1996)
- İskenderun Demir Çelik Genel Müdürlüğü (1996–2005)
- İskenderun Demir Çelikspor (2005–2014)
- Körfez İskenderunspor (2014–present)

== League participations ==
- TFF Second League: 1984–1987, 1995–2001, 2005–2015
- TFF Third League: 2004–2005, 2015–2016
- Turkish Regional Amateur League: 2016–2017
- Hatay Amateur Leagues: 2017–present

== League performances ==
Season	League	Pos	Pld	W	D	L	PF	PA	Pts
1984–85	TFF Second League – 8th Group	5	18	6	7	5	28	30	19
1985–86	TFF Second League – 3rd Group	6	24	10	5	9	32	25	25
1986–87	TFF Second League – 3rd Group	9	32	8	14	10	30	33	30
1995–96	TFF Second League – 3rd Group	2	24	14	8	2	53	23	50
1996–97	TFF Second League – 3rd Group	8	34	15	3	16	52	46	48
1997–98	TFF Second League – 3rd Group	8	32	13	7	12	50	43	46
1998–99	TFF Second League – 3rd Group	8	32	11	7	14	30	35	40
1999–00	TFF Second League – 3rd Group	4	32	15	4	13	56	38	49
2000–01	TFF Second League – 3rd Group	14	32	8	10	14	34	52	34
2004–05	TFF Third League – 1st Group	1	30	19	7	4	57	19	64
2005–06	TFF Second League – B Category – 5th Group	3	18	9	4	5	28	22	31
	TFF Second League – B Category – 5th Klasman Group	6	32	13	7	12	52	51	46
2006–07	TFF Second League – B Category – 5th Group	6	18	6	2	10	20	23	20
	TFF Second League – B Category – 5th Klasman Group	2	32	14	6	12	36	31	48
2007–08	TFF Second League – B Category – 5th Group	3	18	8	7	3	18	11	31
	TFF Second League – B Category – 5th Klasman Group	1	32	13	14	5	35	23	53
	TFF Second League – B Category – Playoffs	Q.F.	1	0	0	1	0	1	0
2008–09	TFF Second League – B Category – 5th Group	5	18	8	4	6	25	21	28
	TFF Second League – B Category – 5th Klasman Group	4	32	13	10	9	42	37	49
2009–10	TFF Second League – 4th Group	2	20	11	5	4	30	16	38
	TFF Second League – Promotion Group	4	16	6	5	5	20	16	23
	TFF Second League – Playoffs	Q.F.	1	0	1	0	1	1	1
2010–11	TFF Second League – White Group	7	34	16	6	12	57	34	54
2011–12	TFF Second League – White Group	9	32	14	4	14	45	42	46
2012–13	TFF Second League – White Group	10	32	10	8	14	27	37	38
2013–14	TFF Second League – Red Group	15	34	9	10	15	34	46	37
2014–15	TFF Second League – White Group	16	36	9	12	15	35	47	39
2015–16	TFF Third League – 3rd Group	16	36	9	13	14	37	55	40
2016–17	Turkish Regional Amateur League – 5th Group	13	24	0	2	22	9	97	2

Promotion
Relegation

Source: TFF: Körfez İskenderunspor

== Current squad ==
- 2013/2014 squad.

Last update: 9 April 2014

Note: Flags indicate national team as defined under FIFA eligibility rules; some limited exceptions apply. Players may hold more than one non-FIFA nationality.

No.	Pos.	Nation	Player
1	GK	TUR	Gökhan Aslan
4	DF	TUR	Onur Cakir
5	DF	TUR	Mehmet Yeniler
6	MF	TUR	Halil İbrahim Can
8	MF	TUR	Mustafa Soytas
9	FW	TUR	Hamza Gür
10	MF	TUR	Salih Kardesgiden
14	FW	TUR	Edim Demir
18	MF	TUR	Ömer Gür
19	FW	TUR	Etem Şahin
20	MF	TUR	Mustafa Serkan Demirel
23	FW	TUR	Serdal Alan

No.	Pos.	Nation	Player
30	MF	TUR	Abdulkadir Yildirim
31	MF	TUR	Taha Can Uysal
33	FW	TUR	Tanju Köse
35	DF	TUR	Dogan Altinkaya
50	DF	TUR	Şeyhmus Abdulkadir Aksu
55	GK	TUR	Kadir Tütüncü
61	DF	TUR	Arda Demiral
66	FW	TUR	Fatih Uyar
76	DF	TUR	Ömür Aggün
87	MF	TUR	Deniz Pıtır
95	MF	TUR	Bahtiyar Yıldız
96	GK	TUR	Suphi Dağ
