= Gökhan Tokgöz =

Turkish footballer

Personal information
- Date of birth: 22 April 1979 (age 47)
- Place of birth: Merzifon, Turkey
- Height: 1.88 m (6 ft 2 in)
- Position: Goalkeeper

Team information
- Current team: Bozüyükspor
- Number: 12

Senior career*
Years	Team	Apps	(Gls)
2003–2008	Gençlerbirliği	76	(0)
2009–2010	Diyarbakirspor	14	(0)
2010–2011	Konyaspor	12	(0)
2011	Kızılcahamamspor		
2012–	Bozüyükspor		
- * Club domestic league appearances and goals as of 20 May 2010

Gökhan Tokgöz (born 22 April 1979 in Merzifon, Amasya) is a Turkish footballer who plays as a goalkeeper for Bozüyükspor.

He had played for Gençlerbirliği from 2002 to 2008.
