= İhsan Burak Özsaraç =

Turkish footballer

Burak Özsaraç
Personal information
- Full name: İhsan Burak Özsaraç
- Date of birth: 7 June 1979 (age 47)
- Place of birth: Karabük, Turkey
- Height: 1.85 m (6 ft 1 in)
- Position: Defender

Senior career*
Years	Team	Apps	(Gls)
1996–1998	Karabükspor	1	(0)
1996–1997	→ Çaycumaspor (loan)	18	(1)
1997–1998	→ Ankara Demirspor (loan)	3	(0)
1998–1999	Kilimli Belediyespor	21	(1)
1999–2001	Konyaspor	56	(8)
2001–2004	MKE Ankaragücü	91	(3)
2004–2006	Denizlispor	65	(3)
2006–2007	Manisaspor	34	(1)
2007–2008	Konyaspor	29	(1)
2008–2009	Ankaragücü	17	(0)
2009–2011	Manisaspor	32	(0)
2011–2012	Gençlerbirliği	19	(1)
2012–2014	Denizlispor	5	(0)
- * Club domestic league appearances and goals

İhsan Burak Özsaraç (born 7 June 1979) is a Turkish retired professional footballer who played as a defender. He has also been capped by the Turkey A-2 squad.

== Club career ==
Özsaraç, who was born in Karabük, began his professional career with local club Karabükspor in 1996. During his tenure with the club, he was loaned out to Çaycumaspor and Ankara Demirspor. He has also played for Kilimli Belediyespor, Konyaspor, MKE Ankaragücü, and Denizlispor.
