= Gökhan Emreciksin =

Turkish footballer (born 1984)

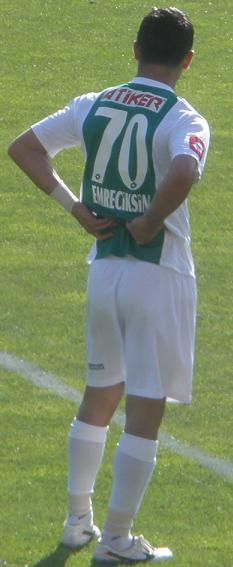

Personal information
- Date of birth: 10 September 1984 (age 42)
- Place of birth: Istanbul, Turkey
- Height: 1.80 m (5 ft 11 in)
- Position: Winger

Team information
- Current team: Bismil 1936 Gençlik

Youth career
- 2000–2003: Istanbul Sinopspor

Senior career*
Years	Team	Apps	(Gls)
2003–2005	Bandırmaspor	50	(7)
2005–2008	Boluspor	78	(12)
2008–2009	MKE Ankaragücü	39	(7)
2009	Fenerbahçe	9	(0)
2009–2010	Kayserispor	21	(4)
2010–2011	Manisaspor	9	(0)
2011–2012	Konyaspor	24	(2)
2012–2013	Elazığspor	8	(1)
2013	Göztepe	5	(0)
2013–2014	Boluspor	7	(0)
2014–2015	Kartalspor	6	(0)
2015	Tarsus Idman Yurdu	13	(3)
2015–2016	Cizrespor	15	(3)
2016	Tekirdağspor	3	(0)
2016	Kütahyaspor	4	(0)
2018	Doğancı	3	(1)
2018–2019	Siirt İl Özel İdaresi		
2019	Lapta TBSK		
2019	Akıncılar GSK		
2019–2020	İstanbul Siirtgücü		
2020–2021	Alaşehir Belediyespor		
2021	İzmirspor		
2021–	Bismil 1936 Gençlik		
- * Club domestic league appearances and goals as of 20 February 2018

Gökhan Emreciksin (born 10 September 1984) is a Turkish professional footballer who plays as a winger for an amateur side Bismil 1936 Gençlik.

== Career ==
Emreciksin transferred from Turkish Super League side Ankaragücü, in which he scored seven goals in 39 appearances, and moved to Fenerbahçe on 3 January 2009, signing a four-and-a-half-year contract. He was signed together with Abdülkadir Kayalı, also transferred from Ankaragücü. He previously played for Turkish teams Boluspor and Bandırmaspor before moving on to Ankaragücü. He was brought up through the youth ranks of Istanbul Sinopspor also spending about two years in the Galatasaray youth team. Emreciksin was handed the number 20 shirt, which was last held by former Fenerbahçe captain Alex, who now is with Brazilian team Coritiba, he was sent to Kayserispor in exchange for Mehmet Topuz and €9 million.

== International ==
His first and currently only call up to the Turkey national football team was on 26 March 2008 which was a friendly against the Belarus national football team.
