= Sezer Sezgin =

Turkish footballer

Personal information
- Full name: Sezer Sezgin
- Date of birth: March 3, 1986 (age 40)
- Place of birth: Bakırköy, Istanbul, Turkey
- Height: 1.88 m (6 ft 2 in)
- Position: Defender

Team information
- Current team: Kırklarelispor
- Number: 39

Youth career
- 1999–2005: Beşiktaş

Senior career*
Years	Team	Apps	(Gls)
2005–2009	Beşiktaş	2	(0)
2006	→ Kayserispor (loan)	0	(0)
2006–2008	→ Karşıyaka SK (loan)	59	(3)
2008–2009	→ Boluspor (loan)	20	(1)
2009–2010	Siirtspor	11	(0)
2010–2011	Samsunspor	18	(2)
2011–2012	Kartalspor	37	(3)
2012–2013	Giresunspor	15	(1)
2013–2014	Eyüpspor	23	(3)
2014–2015	Aydınspor 1923	36	(3)
2016–	Kırklarelispor	0	(0)

International career
2005	Turkey U20	9	(0)
- * Club domestic league appearances and goals as of 28 June 2016

Sezer Sezgin (born 3 March 1986) is a Turkish professional footballer who currently is a part of Kırklarelispor. His role is defender. He represented Turkey at U-20 level for 9 caps in 2005.
