= 2022–23 Altay S.K. season =

Altay
2022–23 season
- President: Ayhan Dündar
- Manager: Sinan Kaloğlu (until 8 February 2023); Tuna Üzümcü (from 1 March 2023)
- Stadium: Alsancak Mustafa Denizli Stadium
- TFF First League: 12th
- Turkish Cup: Third round
- Top goalscorer: League: Marco Paixão (21); All: Marco Paixão (21)

The 2022–23 season was the 109th season in the existence of Altay and the club's first season back in the second division of Turkish football since 2021. In addition to the domestic league, Altay participated in this season's edition of the Turkish Cup. The season covers the period from 1 July 2022 to 30 June 2023.

== Players ==
=== First-team squad ===
As of 16 September 2022

Note: Flags indicate national team as defined under FIFA eligibility rules; some limited exceptions apply. Players may hold more than one non-FIFA nationality.

No.	Pos.	Nation	Player
1	GK	TUR	Ozan Evrim Özenç
2	DF	IRI	Mohammad Naderi
3	DF	TUR	Yusuf Tekin
4	DF	SWE	Eric Björkander
5	DF	TUR	Sefa Özdemir
6	MF	TUR	Ceyhun Gülselam
7	FW	TUR	Eren Erdoğan
8	MF	TUR	Zeki Yıldırım
9	FW	TUR	Nurettin Küçükdeniz
11	FW	TUR	Murat Uluç
14	DF	TUR	Tolga Ünlü
15	DF	TUR	Kutay Yokuşlu
17	DF	TUR	Salih Sarikaya
19	FW	POR	Marco Paixão
21	MF	TUR	Ali Kızılkuyu

No.	Pos.	Nation	Player
22	DF	TUR	Onur Efe
23	MF	TUR	Murat Berkan Demir
24	FW	TUR	Erdem Özcan
25	DF	TUR	Tugay Gündem
26	MF	TUR	Ege Parmaksiz
28	MF	TUR	Mehmet Gündüz
32	MF	TUR	Arda Gezer
33	DF	TUR	Efe Sarıkaya
34	MF	TUR	Enes Öğrüce
35	GK	TUR	Eren Karataş
38	DF	TUR	İbrahim Öztürk
45	GK	TUR	Mustafa Çalışkan
63	FW	TUR	Deniz Kadah
88	DF	TUR	Özgür Özkaya

=== Other players under contract ===
Note: Flags indicate national team as defined under FIFA eligibility rules; some limited exceptions apply. Players may hold more than one non-FIFA nationality.

No.	Pos.	Nation	Player

=== Out on loan ===
Note: Flags indicate national team as defined under FIFA eligibility rules; some limited exceptions apply. Players may hold more than one non-FIFA nationality.

No.	Pos.	Nation	Player
—	DF	TUR	Kuban Altunbudak (at Ağrı 1970 until 30 June 2023)

== Pre-season and friendlies ==
Win Draw Loss Fixtures

8 July 2022 Friendly	İstanbul Başakşehir (Turkey)	4–0	(Turkey) Altay	Burdur
18:00 TRT (UTC+3)	Bangoura 15'; Gürler 32'; Chadli 40'; Çiçek 60'			Stadium: Makü İstiklal Stadı

== Competitions ==
=== Overall record ===
Competition	First match	Last match	Starting round	Final position	Record							
Competition	First match	Last match	Starting round	Final position	Pld	W	D	L	GF	GA	GD	Win %
TFF First League	12 August 2022	20 May 2023	Matchday 1	12th	36	11	10	15	45	48	−3	30.56
Turkish Cup	18 October 2022		Third round	Third round	1	0	0	1	1	2	−1	0.00
Total					37	11	10	16	46	50	−4	29.73

Source: Soccerway

=== TFF First League ===
==== League table ====
Pos	Team	Pld	W	D	L	GF	GA	GD	Pts
10	Bandırmaspor	36	15	10	11	55	58	−3	55
11	Boluspor	36	14	10	12	44	46	−2	52
12	Altay (Note: Göztepe v. Altay was suspended following an attack on a goalkeeper in the 22nd minute. On 9 December 2022, TFF stated that both sides would be considered defeated 3−0.)	36	11	10	15	45	48	−3	40
13	Erzurumspor (Note: Erzurumspor have been deducted 3 points by the Club Licensing Board for failing to meet the licensing requirements.)	36	11	9	16	43	48	−5	39
14	Tuzlaspor	36	11	5	20	42	52	−10	38 (Note: Head-to-head points: Gençlerbirliği 1–2 Tuzlaspor, Tuzlaspor 1–0 Gençlerbirliği)

Source: TFF
Rules for classification: 1) Points; 2) Head-to-head points; 3) Head-to-head goal difference; 4) Head-to-head goals scored; 5) Goal difference; 6) Goals scored

==== Results summary ====
Overall								Home						Away					
Pld	W	D	L	GF	GA	GD	Pts	W	D	L	GF	GA	GD	W	D	L	GF	GA	GD
36	11	10	15	45	48	−3	43	7	4	7	27	23	+4	4	6	8	18	25	−7

Source: Spor Toto 1. Lig

==== Results by round ====
Round	1	2	3	4	5	6	7	8	9	10	11	12	13	14	15	16	17	18	19	20	21	22	23	24	25	26	27	28	29	30	31	32	33	34	35	36	37	38
Ground	H	A	H	A	H	A	H	H	A	H	A	H	A	H	A	H	A		A	A	H	A	H	A	H	A	A	H	A	H	A	H	A	H	A	H		H
Result	L	L	L	D	W	D	D	L	D	D	W	D	W	W	L	W	L	B	L	L	L	D	L	L	W	W	L	L	W	W	L	L	D	D	D	W	B	W
Position	19	19	19	18	15	15	16	17	16	16	15	14	12	10	11	11	11	12	12	14	14	13	14	14	14	13	13	14	12	12	13	13	13	14	13	13	13	12

Source: Spor Toto 1. Lig
A = Away; H = Home; B = Bye; W = Win; D = Draw; L = Loss

==== Matches ====
The league schedule was released on 5 July.

12 August 2022 1	Altay	0–2	Samsunspor	İzmir
21:00 TRT (UTC+3)	Yokuşlu (yellow card) 37'	Report	Harris 22'; Sağat 88'	Stadium: Alsancak Mustafa Denizli Stadium; Attendance: 5,034; Referee: Cihan Aydın

21 August 2022 2	Pendikspor	1–0	Altay	Istanbul
17:00 TRT (UTC+3)	Hatipoğlu (yellow card) 53'; Bitin 90+8'	Report	Gülselam (yellow card) 53'; Erdoğan (yellow card) 53'; Sarıkaya (yellow card) 54'	Stadium: Pendik Stadium; Attendance: 875; Referee: Tarık Güldal

28 August 2022 3	Altay	1–3	Ankara Keçiörengücü	İzmir
21:45 TRT (UTC+3)	Sarıkaya (yellow card) 24'; Björkander (yellow card) 56'; Gülselam (yellow card) 61'; Paixão 80'; Yıldırım (yellow card) 83'	Report	Gür 22'; Yokuşlu 56' (o.g.); Yayıkcı (yellow card) 63'; Karadeniz 81'; Balaj (yellow card) 87'	Stadium: Alsancak Mustafa Denizli Stadium; Referee: Eren Özyemişcioğlu

4 September 2022 4	Adanaspor	1–1	Altay	Adana
20:00 TRT (UTC+3)	Türker 28'; Korkmaz (yellow card) 87'; Jallow (yellow card) 90+3'	Report	Öztürk 14'; Björkander (yellow card) 30'; Gülselam (yellow card) 90+4'	Stadium: New Adana Stadium; Referee: Can Cengiz

11 September 2022 5	Altay	2–0	Bodrumspor	İzmir
20:00 TRT (UTC+3)	Paixão 40'; Tekin (yellow card) 49'; Şen 74' (o.g.); Björkander (yellow card) 76'; Eren Erdoğan (yellow card) 82'; Ünlü (yellow card) 88'	Report	Canlı (yellow card) 87'	Stadium: Alsancak Mustafa Denizli Stadium; Referee: Murat Erdoğan

16 September 2022 6	Yeni Malatyaspor	0–0	Altay	Malatya
20:00 TRT (UTC+3)	Alkan (yellow card) 46'	Report	Özenç (yellow card) 79'	Stadium: New Malatya Stadium; Referee: Oğuzhan Çakır

1 October 2022 7	Altay	0–0	Eyüpspor	İzmir
19:00 TRT (UTC+3)	Tekin (yellow card) 18'; Björkander (yellow card) 90+4'	Report		Stadium: Alsancak Mustafa Denizli Stadium; Referee: Turgut Doman

10 October 2022 8	Altay	0–2	Çaykur Rizespor	İzmir
20:00 TRT (UTC+3)	Sarıkaya (yellow card) 57'; Uluç (yellow card) 80'; Nadiri (yellow card) 83'	Report	Yılmaz (yellow card) 37'; Kanatsızkuş 45+2', 64'; Pala (yellow card) 48'; Potuk (yellow card) 55'	Stadium: Alsancak Mustafa Denizli Stadium; Referee: Abdullah Buğra Taşkınsoy

15 October 2022 9	Manisa	1–1	Altay	Manisa
13:30 TRT (UTC+3)	Uysal 70'; Karapo (yellow card) 90'	Report	Tekin (yellow card) 39'; Gündüz (yellow card) 76'; Paixão 88' (pen.); Sarıkaya (yellow card) 90+4'	Stadium: Mümin Özkasap Stadium; Referee: Alper Akarsu

22 October 2022 10	Altay	1–1	Erzurumspor	İzmir
16:00 TRT (UTC+3)	Paixão 57' (yellow card) 90+2'; Björkander (yellow card) 90'; Öztürk (yellow card) 90+4'	Report	Rosheuvel 18'	Stadium: Alsancak Mustafa Denizli Stadium; Referee: Furkan Aksuoğlu

29 October 2022 11	Sakaryaspor	1–2	Altay	Sakarya
16:00 TRT (UTC+3)	Donkor 47'; Erdoğan (yellow card) 57'	Report	Paixão 10', 45+3'; Sarıkaya (yellow card) 21'; Özenç (yellow card) 44'; Gülselam (yellow card) 82'	Stadium: New Sakarya Atatürk Stadium; Referee: Adnan Deniz Kayatepe

5 November 2022 12	Altay	1–1	Bandırmaspor	İzmir
19:00 TRT (UTC+3)	Yıldırım (yellow card) 45'; Öztürk (yellow card) 45'; Paixão 83'	Report	Mulumba (yellow card) 45'; Saymak 65'; Gelios (yellow card) 70'; Tshibangu (yellow card) 90+2'; Koldaş (yellow card) 90+3'	Stadium: Alsancak Mustafa Denizli Stadium; Referee: Mehmet Türkmen

13 November 2022 13	Altınordu	0–2	Altay	İzmir
16:00 TRT (UTC+3)	Sürmeli (yellow card) 29'; Kaya (yellow card) 64'	Report	Gülselam (red card) 18'; Uluç (yellow card) 21'; Öztürk 65'; Paixão 69' (pen.); Özenç (yellow card) 90+1'	Stadium: Bornova Aziz Kocaoğlu Stadium; Referee: Can Cengiz

21 November 2022 14	Altay	1–0	Gençlerbirliği	İzmir
20:00 TRT (UTC+3)	Paixão 24' (pen.); Yıldırım (yellow card) 85'; Naderi (yellow card) 88'	Report	Özkan (yellow card) 85'	Stadium: Alsancak Mustafa Denizli Stadium; Referee: Ozan Ergün

27 November 2022 15	Göztepe	3–0	Altay	İzmir
19:00 TRT (UTC+3)		Report		Stadium: Gürsel Aksel Stadium; Referee: Emre Kargın
Note: The match was suspended, following an attack on goalkeeper, in the 22nd minute. On 9 December 2022, the Turkish Football Federation stated that both sides would be considered defeated 3−0.

4 December 2022 16	Altay	5–1	Boluspor	İzmir
19:00 TRT (UTC+3)	Sarıkaya 13'; Erdoğan 23' (yellow card) 69'; Öztürk 40'; Paixão 89' (pen.); Yıldırım 90+2'	Report	Baldé 27'; Oularé (yellow card) 82'	Stadium: Alsancak Mustafa Denizli Stadium; Referee: Mete Kalkavan

10 December 2022 17	Denizlispor	2–1	Altay	Denizli
16:00 TRT (UTC+3)	Çeçenoğlu (yellow card) 57'; Çinemre (yellow card) 75'; Schwechlen (yellow card) 76'; Özdemir 86', 90'	Report	Erdoğan (yellow card) 14'; Sarıkaya 46' (yellow card) 51'; Gülselam (yellow card) 57'; Tekin (yellow card) 74'	Stadium: Denizli Atatürk Stadium; Referee: Furkan Aksuoğlu

18	Bye

24 December 2022 19	Tuzlaspor	4–2	Altay	Istanbul
13:30 TRT (UTC+3)	Başacıkoğlu 12'; Adeniyi 32', 63'; Rotman (yellow card) 67'; Yahaya 90'	Report	Gülselam 4'; Paixão 10' (pen.); Björkander (yellow card) 22'; Kadah (yellow card) 90+6'	Stadium: Sancaktepe Stadium; Referee: Abdullah Buğra Taşkınsoy

14 January 2023 20	Samsunspor	2–1	Altay	Samsun
16:00 TRT (UTC+3)	Öztürk 24'; Yüksel (yellow card) 26'; Fofana 63'; Tomané (yellow card) 90'	Report	Sarıkaya (yellow card) 36'; Sarıkaya 68' (yellow card) 90+5'	Stadium: Samsun Stadium; Referee: Oğuzhan Aksu

21 January 2023 21	Altay	1–4	Pendikspor	İzmir
19:00 TRT (UTC+3)	Paixão 45+8' (pen.); Yıldırım (yellow card) 66'	Report	Thuram 25', 90+2' (yellow card) 75'; Kappel 62'; Ildız 69'; Çağlayan (yellow card) 90+7'	Stadium: Alsancak Mustafa Denizli Stadium; Referee: Ömer Tolga Güldibi

29 January 2023 22	Ankara Keçiörengücü	1–1	Altay	Ankara
13:30 TRT (UTC+3)	Cinan (yellow card) 40' (yellow-red card) 89'; Dembélé 50'	Report	Paixão 48'; Öztürk (yellow card) 81'; Naderi (yellow card) 88'	Stadium: Aktepe Stadium; Referee: Raşit Yorgancılar

3 February 2023 23	Altay	0–1	Adanaspor	İzmir
20:00 TRT (UTC+3)	Sarıkaya (yellow card) 31'; Özenç (yellow card) 90+2'	Report	Korkmaz (yellow card) 90+2'; Sacko 90+3' (pen.)	Stadium: Alsancak Mustafa Denizli Stadium; Referee: Erdem Mertoğlu

5 March 2023 24	Bodrumspor	2–0	Altay	Muğla
13:30 TRT (UTC+3)	Özer 25'; Bayrakdar 51'; Ergün (yellow card) 89'	Report	Paixão (yellow card) 31'	Stadium: Bodrum İlçe Stadium; Referee: Muhammet Ali Metoğlu

25	Altay	3–0 (w/o)	Yeni Malatyaspor	İzmir
		Report		Stadium: Alsancak Mustafa Denizli Stadium

13 March 2023 26	Eyüpspor	0–1	Altay	Istanbul
20:00 TRT (UTC+3)	Akdağ (yellow card) 54'	Report	Paixão 68'; Sarıkaya (yellow card) 86'	Stadium: Eyüp Stadium; Referee: Sarper Barış Saka

18 March 2023 27	Çaykur Rizespor	3–1	Altay	Rize
16:00 TRT (UTC+3)	Olawoyin 8'; Mary 21', (yellow card) 62'; Miya (yellow card) 34'; Okechukwu (yellow card) 51'; Keser 80'	Report	Naderi (yellow card) 13'; Björkander (yellow card) 27', (goal) 35'; Yıldırım (yellow card) 45+1'; S. Sarıkaya (yellow card) 62'; E. Sarıkaya (yellow card) 76'	Stadium: Çaykur Didi Stadium; Referee: Gürcan Hasova

25 March 2023 28	Altay	1–3	Manisa	İzmir
16:00 TRT (UTC+3)	Ünlü (yellow card) 25'; Özdemir 34'; Erdoğan (yellow card) 49'; Gülselam (yellow card) 59'; Yıldırım (yellow card) 61'	Report	Mert 29'; Tabla 40'; Prib (yellow card) 70'; Fernandes 90+5'	Stadium: Alsancak Mustafa Denizli Stadium; Referee: Alpaslan Şen

30 March 2023 29	Erzurumspor	2–4	Altay	Erzurum
17:00 TRT (UTC+3)	Rosheuvel 8'; Tozlu (yellow card) 41' (yellow-red card) 75', (goal) 50' (pen.); Özhan (yellow card) 71'; Yumlu (yellow card) 90+5'	Report	Naderi 5'; Sarıkaya (yellow card) 30'; Paixão 47', 77' (pen.); Akbaş 88' (o.g.)	Stadium: Kazım Karabekir Stadium; Referee: Burak Olcar

3 April 2023 30	Altay	3–1	Sakaryaspor	İzmir
20:00 TRT (UTC+3)	Paixão 26' (pen.), (yellow card) 67'; Ünlü (yellow card) 32'; Yıldırım 49'; Özdemir (yellow card) 54'; Gülselam 63', (yellow card) 82'	Report	Donkor (red card) 24'; Yıldırım 29', (yellow card) 41'; Menderes 31'; Köse (yellow card) 64'	Stadium: Alsancak Mustafa Denizli Stadium; Referee: Çağdaş Altay

9 April 2023 31	Bandırmaspor	2–1	Altay	Balıkesir
16:00 TRT (UTC+3)	Çiçek 2'; Özcan (yellow card) 35'; Mulumba (yellow card) 55'; Koutroumpis (red card) 55'; Soukou 78'	Report	Erdoğan (yellow card) 20' (yellow-red card) 55'; Kadah 45+5'; Sarıkaya (yellow card) 59'	Stadium: Bandırma 17 Eylül Stadium; Referee: Feridun Daldaş

13 April 2023 32	Altay	1–2	Altınordu	İzmir
20:30 TRT (UTC+3)	Yıldırım (red card) 48'; Naderi 54'; Sarıkaya (yellow card) 62'	Report	Alıcı (yellow card) 14'; Sürmeli (yellow card) 40'; Aktaş (yellow card) 45+9'; Gürlük 46'; Aydoğan (yellow card) 48'; Özgün 90+8'	Stadium: Alsancak Mustafa Denizli Stadium; Referee: Kutluhan Bilgiç

17 April 2023 33	Gençlerbirliği	0–0	Altay	Ankara
20:30 TRT (UTC+3)	Durak (yellow card) 6'; Torje (yellow card) 76'; Erkio (yellow card) 87'	Report	Karataş (yellow card) 85'; Erdoğan (yellow card) 90+1'	Stadium: Eryaman Stadium; Referee: Yasin Kol

23 April 2023 34	Altay	1–1	Göztepe	İzmir
19:00 TRT (UTC+3)	Paixão 76' (pen.); Gülselam (yellow card) 78'; Efe (yellow card) 90+2'; Sarıkaya (yellow card) 90+9'	Report	Kvasina (yellow card) 45+2'; Nukan (yellow card) 56'; Yokuşlu 90+3' (o.g.); Yıldız (yellow card) 90+8'	Stadium: Alsancak Mustafa Denizli Stadium; Referee: Mete Kalkavan

30 April 2023 35	Boluspor	0–0	Altay	Bolu
13:30 TRT (UTC+3)	Kayamba (yellow card) 55'; Bregu (yellow card) 90+3'	Report		Stadium: Bolu Atatürk Stadium; Referee: Ali Yılmaz

7 May 2023 36	Altay	3–0	Denizlispor	İzmir
16:00 TRT (UTC+3)	Gülselam 7'; Yokuşlu (yellow card) 37'; Paixão 59'; Erdoğan 90'	Report	Kısaoğlu (yellow card) 39'; Sünger (yellow card) 90+5'	Stadium: Alsancak Mustafa Denizli Stadium; Referee: Oğuzhan Aksu

37	Bye

20 May 2023 38	Altay	3–1	Tuzlaspor	İzmir
19:00 TRT (UTC+3)	Gezer 32'; Paixão 45+1', 63'; Demir (yellow card) 89'	Report	Yürür 28'; Bayrak (yellow card) 83'	Stadium: Alsancak Mustafa Denizli Stadium; Referee: Neslihan Muratdağ

=== Turkish Cup ===
18 October 2022 Third round	Altay	1–2 (a.e.t.)	Efeler 09	İzmir
14:00 TRT (UTC+3)	Uluç 12'; Yetkin (yellow card) 69'; Öğrüce (yellow card) 78'; Özcan (yellow card) 109'; Oktay (yellow card) 114'	Report	Sudun 45+1' (pen.); Kabul (yellow card) 52'; Gülen 97'	Stadium: Alsancak Mustafa Denizli Stadium; Referee: Burak Olcar
