= 2023–24 Altay S.K. season =

Altay S.K.
2023–24 season
- Manager: Tuna Üzümcü (until 18 September); Özkan Kılıç (caretaker, from 18 September to 12 October); Bahloul Djilali (from 12 October to 20 November); Serkan Afacan (from 21 November to 8 December); Yusuf Şimşek (from 8 December to 25 January); Cüneyt Biçer (from 30 January)
- Stadium: Alsancak Mustafa Denizli Stadium
- TFF First League: Ongoing
- Turkish Cup: Fourth round

The 2023–24 season is Altay S.K.'s 110th season in existence and second consecutive in the TFF First League, the second division of Turkish football. They will also compete in the Turkish Cup.

== Players ==
=== First-team squad ===
As of 11 September 2023

Note: Flags indicate national team as defined under FIFA eligibility rules; some limited exceptions apply. Players may hold more than one non-FIFA nationality.

No.	Pos.	Nation	Player
1	GK	TUR	Ozan Evrim Özenç
3	DF	TUR	Yusuf Tekin
5	DF	TUR	Sefa Özdemir
6	MF	TUR	Ceyhun Gülselam
7	FW	TUR	Eren Erdoğan
8	MF	TUR	Zeki Yıldırım
11	FW	TUR	Murat Uluç
14	DF	TUR	Tolga Ünlü
17	DF	TUR	Salih Sarıkaya
19	FW	POR	Marco Paixão
20	MF	TUR	Enes Yetkin
21	MF	TUR	Ali Kızılkuyu
23	MF	TUR	Murat Demir
24	FW	TUR	Erdem Özcan
25	DF	TUR	Tugay Gündem

No.	Pos.	Nation	Player
26	MF	TUR	Ege Parmaksiz
28	MF	TUR	Mehmet Gündüz
30	MF	TUR	Caner Baycan
32	MF	TUR	Arda Gezer
33	DF	TUR	Efe Sarıkaya
34	MF	TUR	Enes Öğrüce
35	GK	TUR	Eren Karataş
38	DF	TUR	İbrahim Öztürk
44	DF	TUR	Kuban Altunbudak
45	GK	TUR	Mustafa Çalışkan
63	FW	TUR	Deniz Kadah
77	DF	TUR	Onur Efe
88	DF	TUR	Özgür Özkaya
99	FW	TUR	Nurettin Küçükdeniz
—	FW	TUR	Erdem Özcan

== Transfers ==
=== In ===
Pos.	Player	Transferred from	Fee	Date	Source

=== Out ===
Pos.	Player	Transferred to	Fee	Date	Source

== Pre-season and friendlies ==
Win Draw Loss Fixtures

19 July 2023 Friendly	Kocaelispor (Turkey)	3–2	(Turkey) Altay

== Competitions ==
=== Overall record ===
Competition	First match	Last match	Starting round	Final position	Record							
Competition	First match	Last match	Starting round	Final position	Pld	W	D	L	GF	GA	GD	Win %
TFF First League	14 August 2023	10 May 2024	Matchday 1		23	4	3	16	11	47	−36	17.39
Turkish Cup	1 November 2023	6 December 2023	Third round	Fourth round	2	1	0	1	4	4	+0	50.00
Total					25	5	3	17	15	51	−36	20.00

Last updated: 18 February 2024
Source: Soccerway

=== TFF First League ===
==== League table ====
Pos	Team	Pld	W	D	L	GF	GA	GD	Pts	Qualification or relegation
15	Şanlıurfaspor	34	9	11	14	32	37	−5	38 (Note: Ranked on goal difference: Şanlıurfaspor (–5), Tuzlaspor (–12).)	
16	Tuzlaspor (R)	34	9	11	14	35	47	−12	38	Relegation to the TFF Second League
17	Altay (Note: Altay have been deducted 3 points by the Club Licensing Board for failing to meet the licensing requirements. Later, another 6 points have been deducted.) (R)	34	5	4	25	16	76	−60	10	Relegation to the TFF Second League
18	Giresunspor (Note: Giresunspor have been deducted 3 points.) (R)	34	2	4	28	16	71	−55	7	Relegation to the TFF Second League
19	Yeni Malatyaspor (Note: Yeni Malatyaspor withdrew from the league following the 2023 Turkey–Syria earthquake and will not be relegated at the end of the season.)	0	0	0	0	0	0	0	0	Withdrew

Updated to match(es) played on 11 May 2024. Source: TFF
Rules for classification: 1) Points; 2) Head-to-head points; 3) Head-to-head goal difference; 4) Head-to-head goals scored; 5) Goal difference; 6) Goals scored
(R) Relegated

==== Results summary ====
Overall								Home						Away					
Pld	W	D	L	GF	GA	GD	Pts	W	D	L	GF	GA	GD	W	D	L	GF	GA	GD
23	4	3	16	11	47	−36	15	3	2	6	7	18	−11	1	1	10	4	29	−25

Last updated: 18 February 2024.

==== Results by round ====
Round	1	2	3	4	5	6	7	8	9	10	11	12	13	14	15	16	17	18	19	20	21	22	23	24
Ground	A	H	A	H	A	H	A	H	A	H	A	H	A	A	H	A	H	H	A	H	A	H	A	H
Result	L	W	L	L	L	D	D	L	L	L	L	L	L	L	L	W	W	W	L	L	L	D	L	
Position	11	16	17	17	18	18	17	18	18	18	18	18	18	18	18	18	17	17	17	17	17	17	17	

Updated to match(es) played on 18 February 2024. Source:
A = Away; H = Home; W = Win; D = Draw; L = Loss

==== Matches ====
The league fixtures were unveiled on 19 July 2023.

14 August 2023 1	Şanlıurfaspor	2–1	Altay	Şanlıurfa
21:00				Stadium: Şanlıurfa 11 Nisan Stadyumu; Referee: Muhammet Ali Metoğlu

20 August 2023 2	Altay	1–0	Tuzlaspor	İzmir
21:45	Öztürk 73'			Stadium: Alsancak Mustafa Denizli Stadium; Referee: Raşit Yorgancılar

27 August 2023 3	Kocaelispor	3–2	Altay	İzmit
21:45				Stadium: Kocaeli Stadium; Referee: Oğuzhan Aksu

3 September 2023 4	Altay	0–1	Göztepe	İzmir
				Stadium: Alsancak Mustafa Denizli Stadium

16 September 2023 5	Erzurumspor	4–0	Altay

25 September 2023 6	Altay	1–1	Bodrum	İzmir
				Stadium: Alsancak Mustafa Denizli Stadium

30 September 2023 7	Giresunspor	0–0	Altay

8 October 2023 8	Altay	0–3	Ümraniyespor	İzmir
				Stadium: Alsancak Mustafa Denizli Stadium

23 October 2023 9	Gençlerbirliği	3–0	Altay

29 October 2023 10	Altay	1–2	Sakaryaspor	İzmir
				Stadium: Alsancak Mustafa Denizli Stadium

5 November 2023 11	Bandırmaspor	2–0	Altay

11 November 2023 12	Altay	1–7	Eyüpspor	İzmir
				Stadium: Alsancak Mustafa Denizli Stadium

26 November 2023 13	Çorum	3–0	Altay

3 December 2023 14	Manisa	3–0	Altay

11 December 2023 15	Altay	0–1	Boluspor	İzmir
				Stadium: Alsancak Mustafa Denizli Stadium

20 December 2023 16	Adanaspor	0–1	Altay

24 December 2023 17	Altay	2–1	Ankara Keçiörengücü	İzmir
				Stadium: Alsancak Mustafa Denizli Stadium

15 January 2024 18	Altay	1–0	Şanlıurfaspor	İzmir
				Stadium: Alsancak Mustafa Denizli Stadium

21 January 2024 19	Tuzlaspor	2–0	Altay

28 January 2024 20	Altay	0–2	Kocaelispor	İzmir
				Stadium: Alsancak Mustafa Denizli Stadium

3 February 2024 21	Göztepe	4–0	Altay

10 February 2024 22	Altay	0–0	Erzurumspor	İzmir
				Stadium: Alsancak Mustafa Denizli Stadium

18 February 2024 23	Bodrum	3–0	Altay	Bodrum
13:30	Ergün 23' (pen.); Bayrakdar 57'; Özer 78' (pen.)			Stadium: Bodrum İlçe Stadı; Referee: Süleyman Bahadır

23 February 2024 24	Altay	v	Giresunspor	İzmir
20:00				Stadium: Alsancak Mustafa Denizli Stadium

=== Turkish Cup ===
1 November 2023 Third round	Altay	2–1	Aliağa Futbol A.Ş.	İzmir
14:00	Uluç 44', 68'		Bakal 90+3'	Stadium: Alsancak Mustafa Denizli

6 December 2023 Fourth round	Altay	2–3	Kırklarelispor	İzmir
14:00	Uluç 58' (pen.); Öztürk 89'		Taş 10'; Derici 49' (pen.), 71'	Stadium: Alsancak Mustafa Denizli
