= 2016–17 Antalyaspor season =

Antalyaspor
2016–17 season
- Chairman: Ali Şafak Öztürk
- Manager: Rıza Çalımbay
- Stadium: Antalya Stadium
- Süper Lig: 5th
- Turkish Cup: Third round
- Top goalscorer: League: Samuel Eto'o (18); All: Samuel Eto'o (18)
Home colours	Away colours	Third colours

The 2016–17 season was Antalyaspor's 51st year in existence. In addition to the domestic league, Antalyaspor participated in the Turkish Cup.

== Competitions ==
=== Süper Lig ===
==== League table ====
Pos	Team	Pld	W	D	L	GF	GA	GD	Pts	Qualification or relegation
3	Fenerbahçe	34	18	10	6	60	32	+28	64 (Note: Fenerbahçe ahead of Galatasaray on head-to-head points: Fenerbahçe 6 pts, Galatasaray 0 pts.)	Qualification for the Europa League third qualifying round
4	Galatasaray	34	20	4	10	65	40	+25	64	Qualification for the Europa League second qualifying round
5	Antalyaspor	34	17	7	10	47	40	+7	58	
6	Trabzonspor	34	14	9	11	39	34	+5	51	
7	Akhisar Belediyespor	34	14	6	14	46	42	+4	48	

Source: Süper Lig, Soccerway
Rules for classification: 1) Points; 2) Head-to-head points; 3) Head-to-head goal difference; 4) Head-to-head goals scored; 5) Goal difference; 6) Goals scored; 7) Play-off.

==== Results summary ====
Overall								Home						Away					
Pld	W	D	L	GF	GA	GD	Pts	W	D	L	GF	GA	GD	W	D	L	GF	GA	GD
34	17	7	10	47	40	+7	58	9	4	4	20	16	+4	8	3	6	27	24	+3

Last updated: 2 June 2017.

==== Results by matchday ====
Matchday	1	2	3	4	5	6	7	8	9	10	11	12	13	14	15	16	17	18	19	20	21	22	23	24	25	26	27	28	29	30	31	32	33	34
Ground	H	A	H	A	H	A	H	A	A	H	A	H	A	H	A	H	A	A	H	A	H	A	H	A	H	H	A	H	A	H	A	H	A	H
Result	D	L	L	L	D	L	D	L	W	W	W	W	D	W	L	W	W	W	W	D	W	L	L	W	D	W	D	L	W	L	W	W	W	W
Position	10	15	17	17	17	18	18	18	17	16	11	10	10	9	9	9	7	5	5	5	5	5	6	6	6	6	6	6	6	6	6	5	5	5

Updated to match(es) played on 2 June 2017. Source:
A = Away; H = Home; W = Win; D = Draw; L = Loss

==== Matches ====
21 August 2016 1	Antalyaspor	0 - 0	Osmanlıspor	Antalya
21:45	Danilo (yellow card) 18'; Fornezzi (red card) 36'; Güral (yellow card) 45+3'; Şimşek (yellow card) 81'; Diego Ângelo (yellow card) 81'	Report	Vršajević (yellow card) 45+3'; Çürüksu (yellow card) 61'; Procházka (yellow card) 66'	Stadium: Antalya Arena; Referee: (Turkey) Alper Ulusoy

26 August 2016 2	Alanyaspor	2 - 1	Antalyaspor	Antalya
21:45	Guerrier 62'; Ayité 90+3'	Report	Yıldırım 5'	Stadium: Antalya Arena; Referee: (Turkey) Fırat Aydınus

11 September 2016 3	Antalyaspor	1 - 3	Konyaspor	Antalya
20:00	Carles (yellow card) 35'; Danilo (yellow card) 64'; Kurtuluş (yellow card) 87'; Diego Ângelo (yellow card) 87'; Eto'o 90+1'	Report	Milošević (yellow card) 39'; Ali Şahiner 49' 55' (yellow card) 87'; Rangelov 65'; Çamdalı (yellow card) 87'	Stadium: Antalya Arena; Referee: (Turkey) Hüseyin Göçek

16 September 2016 4	Kardemir Karabükspor	3 - 2	Antalyaspor	Karabük
19:00	Latovlevici (yellow card) 41'; Tănase 54'; Skúlason (yellow card) 73'; Başdaş (yellow card) 76'; Traoré 80' 86'	Report	Eto'o (yellow card) 53'; Kaplan (yellow card) 59'; Diego Ângelo 77'; Kadah 90+2'	Stadium: Dr. Necmettin Şeyhoğlu Stadium; Referee: (Turkey) Cüneyt Çakır

23 September 2016 5	Antalyaspor	0 - 0	Akhisar Belediyespor	Antalya
20:00	Kurtuluş (yellow card) 25'; Chico (yellow card) 83'	Report	Ayık (yellow card) 64'; Custódio Castro (yellow card) 77'; Miguel Lopes (yellow card) 90'	Stadium: Antalya Arena; Referee: (Turkey) Baris Simsek

2 October 2016 6	Galatasaray	3 - 1	Antalyaspor	Istanbul
16:00	Ciğerci (yellow card) 61'; İnan 66'; Podolski 78' 85'	Report	Kadah 17'; Chico (yellow card) 73'	Stadium: Türk Telekom Stadium; Referee: (Turkey) Özgür Yankaya

17 October 2016 7	Antalyaspor	1 - 1	Çaykur Rizespor	Antalya
19:00	Charles (yellow card) 39'; Ramon Motta (yellow card) 66'; Kedah 72'; Yıldırım (yellow card) 74'	Report	Kurt (yellow card) 30'; Petrucci (yellow card) 31'; Oboabona (yellow card) 53'; Özek 90+1'	Stadium: Antalya Arena; Referee: (Turkey) Bülent Yıldırım (referee)

23 October 2016 8	Beşiktaş	3 - 0	Antalyaspor	Istanbul
19:00	Hutchinson (yellow card) 3'; Aboubakar 45+1'; Marcelo (yellow card) 57'; Talisca 72' 89'	Report	Yıldırım (yellow card) 15'; Diego Ângelo (red card) 45+2'; Kedah (yellow card) 45+2'; Eto'o (yellow card) 45+3'; Chico (yellow card) 61'	Stadium: Vodafone Park; Referee: (Turkey) Baris Simsek

31 October 2016 9	Kayserispor	0 - 1	Antalyaspor	Kayseri
19:00	Bulut (yellow card) 43'; Sow (yellow card) 90'	Report	Eot'o 28' (pen.); Etame (yellow card) 77'; Horić (yellow card) 90+5'; Fornezzi (yellow card) 90+5'	Stadium: Kayseri Kadir Has Şehir Stadyumu; Referee: (Turkey) Cüneyt Çakır

5 November 2016 10	Antalyaspor	1 - 0	Gençlerbirliği	Antalya
18:00	Eto'o 41' (pen.); Diego Ângelo (yellow card) 77'; Yıldırım (yellow card) 90'	Report	Oğuz (yellow card) 16'; Kulušić (yellow card) 33'; Karabulut (yellow card) 44'; Şahin (yellow card) 55'; Çiftçi (yellow card) 73'; Milinković (yellow card) 82'	Stadium: Antalya Arena; Referee: (Turkey) Umit Öztürk

21 November 2016 11	Trabzonspor	0 - 1	Antalyaspor	Trabzon
19:00	Ekici (yellow card) 11'; N'Doye (yellow card) 17'; Onazi (yellow card) 45+3'; Akbaş (yellow card) 47'; Kıvrak (yellow card) 47'; Ďurica (yellow card) 50'; Yumlu (yellow card) 50'; Yokuşlu (yellow card) 74'	Report	Chico 8'; Aytaç (yellow card) 30'; Etame (yellow card) 74'; Charles (yellow card) 80'; Ramon Motta (yellow card) 90+6'	Stadium: Şenol Güneş Stadium; Referee: (Turkey) Alper Ulusoy

26 November 2016 12	Antalyaspor	1 - 0	Adanaspor	Antalya
18:00	Ramon Motta 44' (yellow card) 70'	Report	Maurício Ramos (yellow card) 65'	Stadium: Antalya Arena; Referee: (Turkey) Halis Özkahya

3 December 2016 13	İstanbul Başakşehir	2 - 2	Antalyaspor	Istanbul
13:00	Tekdemir 19'; Attamah (yellow card) 29'; Mossoró 47'; Öztorun (yellow card) 76' (yellow-red card)	Report	Eto'o 13' 65' (pen.); Charles (yellow card) 67' (yellow-red card)	Stadium: Başakşehir Fatih Terim Stadium; Referee: (Turkey) Bülent Yıldırım (referee)

12 December 2016 14	Antalyaspor	1 - 0	Fenerbahçe	Antalya
19:00	Diego Ângelo (yellow card) 5'; Kurtuluş 65'	Report	Kaldırım (yellow card) 87'	Stadium: Antalya Arena; Referee: (Turkey) Cüneyt Çakır

19 December 2016 15	Bursaspor	2 - 1	Antalyaspor	Bursa
19:00	Ersoy (yellow card) 5'; Kanatsızkuş 20'; Batalla 32' (yellow card) 69'; Özgenç (yellow card) 44'; Yılmaz (yellow card) 89'	Report	Danilo (yellow card) 16'; Yıldırım (yellow card) 37'; Kadah 41'; Charles (yellow card) 45+2'; Etame (yellow card) 54'; Aytaç (yellow card) 60'; Şimşek (yellow card) 81'	Stadium: Bursa Büyükşehir Belediye Stadyumu; Referee: (Turkey) Ali Palabıyık

=== Turkish Cup ===
27 October 2016 Round 3	Aydınspor 1923	1 - 0	Antalyaspor	Aydın
14:30	Mustafa Babaoğlu 13'; Berat Genç (yellow card) 27'; Gürcan Gözüm (yellow card) 31'; Ismail Hacıhafızoğlu (yellow card) 77'	Summary	Horić (yellow card) 39'; Yıldırım (yellow card) 83'	Stadium: Aydın Adnan Menderes; Referee: (Turkey) Suleyman Abay
