= 2009–10 Beşiktaş J.K. season =

Beşiktaş J.K.
2009–10 season
- President: Yıldırım Demirören
- Head coach: Mustafa Denizli
- Stadium: BJK İnönü Stadium
- Süper Lig: 4th
- Turkish Cup: Group stage
- UEFA Champions League: Group stage (4th)
- Turkish Super Cup: Runners-up
- Peace Cup: Group stage
- Top goalscorer: League: Bobô (12); All: Bobô (14)
Home colours	Away colours	Third colours

The 2009–10 season was the 106th year of Beşiktaş' existence, as well as its 50th season in the Süper Lig. The club also competed in the Turkish Cup and UEFA Champions League. Beşiktaş entered the season as the defending champion of both the Süper Lig and the Turkish Cup. During the pre-season, the club also participated in the Peace Cup, finishing second in their group behind Porto and ahead of Lyon.

The first transfer of the January window was goalkeeper Ramazan Özcan.

== Team kit ==
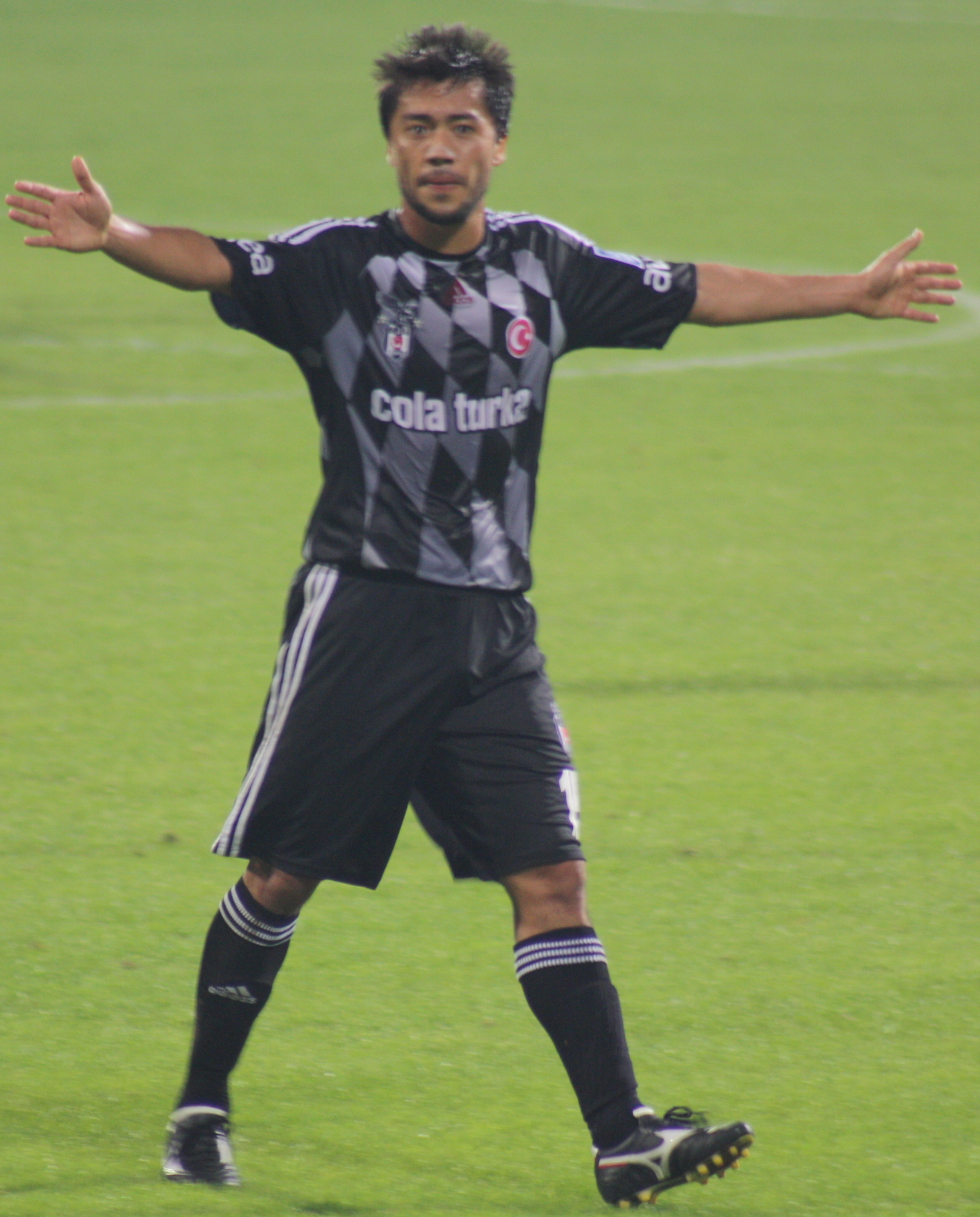
Rodrigo Tabata with alternate kit

The new season kits of Beşiktaş were introduced on 19 July on the season jersey and fall/winter fashion clothing show at Nevzat Demir Facilities. The kit supplier of jerseys is Adidas and the main jersey sponsor is Cola Turka for the season, as it is since 2004.

Home
Away
Alternative

== Players ==
=== First team squad ===
According to official club website as of 31 July 2009:

No.	Name	Nationality	Position	Date of birth (age)	Signed from	Notes
Goalkeepers
1	Rüştü Reçber	(Turkey)	GK	May 10, 1973 (aged 37)	Fenerbahçe	
78	Korcan Çelikay	(Turkey)	GK	December 31, 1987 (aged 22)	Youth Team	
84	Hakan Arıkan	(Turkey)	GK	July 17, 1982 (aged 27)	Ankaraspor	
Defenders
4	İbrahim Kaş	(Turkey)	CB/RB	September 20, 1986 (aged 23)	Getafe	
3	İsmail Köybaşı	(Turkey)	LB	July 10, 1989 (aged 20)	Gaziantepspor	
6	Tomáš Sivok	(Czech Republic)	CB	September 15, 1983 (aged 26)	Udinese	
7	Rıdvan Şimşek	(Turkey)	RB/RW	January 17, 1991 (aged 19)	Karşıyaka	
17	Ekrem Dağ	(Austria) (Turkey)	RB/RW/LB	December 5, 1980 (aged 29)	Gaziantepspor	
19	İbrahim Üzülmez (c)	(Turkey)	LB	March 10, 1974 (aged 36)	Gaziantepspor	
27	Matteo Ferrari	(Italy)	CB	December 5, 1979 (aged 30)	Genoa	
44	Erhan Güven	(Turkey)	RB	May 15, 1982 (aged 28)	Ankaraspor	
20	İbrahim Toraman	(Turkey)	CB/RB	November 20, 1981 (aged 28)	Gaziantepspor	
Midfielders
5	Michael Fink	(Germany)	DM	February 1, 1982 (aged 28)	Eintracht Frankfurt	
10	Matías Delgado	(Argentina) (Italy)	AM	December 15, 1983 (aged 26)	Basel	
14	Rodrigo Tello	(Chile)	AM/LW	October 17, 1979 (aged 30)	Sporting CP	
15	Necip Uysal	(Turkey)	MF	January 21, 1991 (aged 19)	Youth Team	
21	Serdar Özkan	(Turkey)	AM/RW	January 1, 1987 (aged 23)	Youth Team	
25	Uğur İnceman	(Turkey)	DM/MC	May 25, 1981 (aged 29)	Manisaspor	
28	Fabian Ernst	(Germany)	DM/MC	May 30, 1979 (aged 31)	Schalke 04	
29	Yusuf Şimşek	(Turkey)	AM	July 20, 1975 (aged 34)	Bursaspor	
77	Erkan Zengin	(Sweden) (Turkey)	AM/RW	August 4, 1985 (aged 24)	Hammarby IF	
Forwards
8	Nihat Kahveci	(Turkey)	FW/RW/AM	November 23, 1979 (aged 30)	Villarreal	
11	Mert Nobre	(Brazil) (Turkey)	FW	November 1, 1980 (aged 29)	Fenerbahçe	
13	Bobô	(Brazil)	FW	January 9, 1985 (aged 25)	Corinthians	
23	Filip Hološko	(Slovakia)	FW/RW	January 17, 1984 (aged 26)	Manisaspor	
9	Batuhan Karadeniz	(Turkey)	FW	April 24, 1991 (aged 19)	Youth Team	

=== Transfers ===
==== In ====
No.	Pos.	Nat.	Name	Age	EU	Moving from	Type	Transfer window	Ends	Transfer fee	Source
3	LB	(Turkey)	İsmail Köybaşı	36	Non-EU	Gaziantepspor	Transfer	Summer		€6.5M + 2 players	(in Turkish)
5	MF	(Germany)	Michael Fink	44	EU	Eintracht Frankfurt (Germany)	Transfer	Summer		Free transfer	(in Turkish)
7	RB	(Turkey)	Rıdvan Şimşek	35	Non-EU	Karşıyaka	Transfer	Summer		TRY1.25 million	(in Turkish)
8	FW	(Turkey)	Nihat Kahveci	46	EU	Villarreal (Spain)	Transfer	Summer		€4.5M	(in Turkish)
27	DF	(Italy)	Matteo Ferrari	45	EU	Genoa (Italy)	Transfer	Summer		€4.5M	(in Turkish)
44	RB	(Turkey)	Erhan Güven	43	Non-EU	Ankaraspor	Exchange	Summer		In return of Karabulut	(in Turkish)
4	CB	(Turkey)	İbrahim Kaş	39	Non-EU	Getafe (Spain)	Loan	Summer	Jun 2010	No fee paid	(in Turkish)

==== Out ====
No.	Pos.	Nat.	Name	Age	EU	Moving from	Type	Transfer window	Ends	Transfer fee	Source
2	RB	(Turkey)	Serdar Kurtuluş	38	Non-EU	Gaziantepspor	Exchange	Summer		In return of Köybaşı	(in Turkish)
5	CB	(Turkey)	Gökhan Zan	43	Non-EU	Galatasaray	Transfer	Summer		Free transfer	(in Turkish)
4	MF	(France)	Édouard Cissé	47	EU	Marseille (France)	Transfer	Summer		Free transfer	(in French)
20	MF	(Turkey)	Aydın Karabulut	38	Non-EU	Ankaraspor	Exchange	Summer		In return of Güven	(in Turkish)
24	CB	(Croatia)	Gordon Schildenfeld	40	Non-EU	Sturm Graz (Austria)	Loan	Summer	Jun 2010		(in Turkish)
26	CB	(Czech Republic)	Tomáš Zápotočný	45	Non-EU	Bursaspor	Loan	Summer	Jun 2010		(in Turkish)

== Statistics ==
=== Süper Lig ===
==== Standings ====
Pos	Team	Pld	W	D	L	GF	GA	GD	Pts	Qualification or relegation
2	Fenerbahçe	34	23	5	6	61	28	+33	74	Qualification to Champions League third qualifying round
3	Galatasaray	34	19	7	8	61	35	+26	64 (Note: Galatasaray finished ahead of Beşiktaş on head-to-head record: Galatasaray–Beşiktaş 3–0, Beşiktaş–Galatasaray 1–1.)	Qualification to Europa League third qualifying round
4	Beşiktaş	34	18	10	6	47	25	+22	64	Qualification to Europa League second qualifying round
5	Trabzonspor	34	16	9	9	53	32	+21	57	Qualification to Europa League play-off round (Note: Trabzonspor won the 2009–10 Turkish Cup and thus qualified for the play-off round of the UEFA Europa League.)
6	İstanbul B.B.	34	16	8	10	47	44	+3	56	

Source: Süper Lig official website
Rules for classification: 1st overall points, 2nd head-to-head points, 3rd head-to-head goal differential, 4th overall goal differential, 5th overall goals scored.

==== Results by round ====
Round	1	2	3	4	5	6	7	8	9	10	11	12	13	14	15	16	17	18	19	20	21	22	23	24	25	26	27	28	29	30	31	32	33	34
Ground	A	H	A	H	A	H	A	H	A	H	A	H	H	H	A	H	H	A	H	H	A	H	A	H	A	H	A	H	A	A	H	H	A	H
Result	D	W	D	D	L	L	W	W	W	W	W	W	W	W	D	D	L	W	W	W	L	D	W	W	W	D	W	D	D	L	D	W	W	L
Position	8	4	5	8	12	12	9	8	7	5	4	3	3	2	3	5	5	5	5	5	5	5	5	4	3	4	3	3	4	4	4	4	4	4

Updated to match(es) played on 2009-12-24. Source: tff.org
A = Away; H = Home; W = Win; D = Draw; L = Loss

==== Team record ====
Team	Home	Away	Aggregate
Ankaragücü	1–0	0–0	1–0
Ankaraspor	3–0	3–0	6–0
Antalyaspor	2–0	1–0	3–0
Bursaspor	2–3	1–2	3–5
Denizlispor	1–0	1–0	2–0
Diyarbakırspor	0–0	3–1	3–1
Eskişehirspor	3–2	1–0	4–2
Fenerbahçe	3–0	0–1	3–1
Galatasaray	1–1	0–3	1–4
Gaziantepspor	0–0	0–2	0–2
Gençlerbirliği	0–0	4–1	4–1
İstanbul BB	2–0	1–1	3–1
Kasımpaşa	2–1	2–2	4–3
Kayserispor	0–1	2–1	2–2
Manisaspor	2–0	1–1	3–1
Sivasspor	2–2	1–0	3–2
Trabzonspor	0–0	2–0	2–0

==== Top scorers ====
Rank	Player	All	TSL	TC	CL
1.	Bobô	14	12	1	1
2.	Filip Hološko	6	6	0	0
3.	Rodrigo Tello	5	4	0	1
4.	Nihat Kahveci	5	3	2	0
5.	Ekrem Dağ	3	2	0	1
6.	Mert Nobre	3	1	2	0
7.	Michael Fink	2	2	0	0
8.	Rodrigo Tabata	2	2	0	0
9.	Uğur İnceman	2	2	0	0
10.	Tomáš Sivok	2	2	0	0
11.	İsmail Köybaşı	1	1	0	0
12.	Fabian Ernst	1	1	0	0
13.	İbrahim Toraman	1	1	0	0
14.	Yusuf Şimşek	1	0	1	0

== Friendly matches ==
July 19, 2009	Beşiktaş	1–1	Catania	Istanbul, Turkey
	Tello 56'	Report	Martínez 32'	Stadium: BJK İnönü Stadium; Referee: Özgür Yankaya

== Peace Cup ==
Beşiktaş participated in the 2009 "Peace Cup". Beşiktaş was placed in group D, along with Porto (Portugal) and Lyon (France). Beşiktaş finished 2nd place missing the knockout round by 2 points.

Team	Pld	W	D	L	GF	GA	GD	Pts	Qualification
(Portugal) Porto	2	1	1	0	2	0	+2	4	Advance to the semi-finals
(Turkey) Beşiktaş	2	0	2	0	1	1	0	2	
(France) Lyon	2	0	1	1	1	3	−2	1	

July 25, 2009	Lyon	1–1	Beşiktaş	Huelva, Spain
	Källström 63'	Report	Nobre 84'	Stadium: Estadio Colombino; Attendance: 300; Referee: Manuel Mejuto González

July 29, 2009	Beşiktaş	0–0	Porto	Seville, Spain
		Report		Stadium: Ramón Sánchez Pizjuán Stadium; Attendance: 500; Referee: Michail Koukoulakis

== Turkish Super Cup ==
Beşiktaş played the 2008–09 Turkish Cup finalist Fenerbahçe for the Turkish Super Cup. Beşiktaş previously defeated Fenerbahçe 4–2 in the Turkish Cup final.

August 2, 2009	Beşiktaş (Turkey)	0–2	(Turkey) Fenerbahçe	Istanbul, Turkey
		Report	Alex 75' (pen.), 90+1'	Stadium: Atatürk Olympic Stadium; Attendance: 30,000; Referee: Yunus Yıldırım

== Turkish Super League ==
As the defending Super League champions, Beşiktaş started the 2009–10 Turkish Super League season with a 1–1 draw with İstanbul B.B.

=== First Half ===
August 7, 2009	İstanbul B.B. (Turkey)	1–1	(Turkey) Beşiktaş	Istanbul, Turkey
	Akın 31'	Report	Fink 29'	Stadium: Atatürk Olympic Stadium; Referee: Tolga Özkalfa

August 17, 2009	Beşiktaş (Turkey)	2–0	(Turkey) Antalyaspor	Istanbul, Turkey
	Hološko 73'; Tello 78'	Report		Stadium: BJK İnönü Stadium; Referee: İlker Meral

August 22, 2009	Gençlerbirliği (Turkey)	0–0	(Turkey) Beşiktaş	Ankara, Turkey
		Report		Stadium: Ankara 19 Mayıs Stadium; Referee: Koray Gençerler

August 28, 2009	Beşiktaş (Turkey)	0–0	(Turkey) Gaziantepspor	Istanbul, Turkey
		Report		Stadium: BJK İnönü Stadium; Referee: Deniz Çoban

September 12, 2009	Galatasaray (Turkey)	3–0	(Turkey) Beşiktaş	Istanbul, Turkey
	Sarp 4'; Baroš 64', 82'	Report		Stadium: Ali Sami Yen Stadium; Referee: Bülent Yıldırım

September 19, 2009	Beşiktaş (Turkey)	0–1	(Turkey) Kayserispor	Istanbul, Turkey
		Report	Makukula 53'	Stadium: BJK İnönü Stadium; Referee: Bünyamin Gezer

Ankaraspor^{1} (Turkey)	0–3	(Turkey) Beşiktaş
	Report

October 3, 2009	Beşiktaş (Turkey)	1–0	(Turkey) Denizlispor	Istanbul, Turkey
	Tabata 49'	Report		Stadium: BJK İnönü Stadium; Referee: Fırat Aydınus

October 17, 2009	Beşiktaş (Turkey)	2–1	(Turkey) Kasımpaşa	Istanbul, Turkey
	Kahveci 49'; Bobô 38'		Moritz 88' (pen.)	Stadium: BJK İnönü Stadium; Referee: Hüseyin Göçek

October 24, 2009	Eskişehirspor (Turkey)	0–1	(Turkey) Beşiktaş	Eskişehir, Turkey
		Report	Dağ 88'	Stadium: Eskişehir Atatürk Stadium; Referee: Tolga Özkalfa

October 31, 2009	Beşiktaş (Turkey)	1–0	(Turkey) Ankaragücü	Istanbul, Turkey
	Köybaşı 16'	Report		Stadium: BJK İnönü Stadium; Referee: Halis Özkahya

November 7, 2009	Trabzonspor (Turkey)	0–2	(Turkey) Beşiktaş	Trabzon, Turkey
		Report	Ernst 47'; Bobô 89'	Stadium: Hüseyin Avni Aker Stadium; Referee: Kuddusi Müftüoğlu

November 21, 2009	Beşiktaş (Turkey)	3–0	(Turkey) Fenerbahçe	Istanbul, Turkey
	Fink 53'; Bobô 57'; İnceman 82'	Report		Stadium: BJK İnönü Stadium; Referee: Fırat Aydınus

November 29, 2009	Sivasspor (Turkey)	0–1	(Turkey) Beşiktaş	Sivas, Turkey
		Report	Bobô 28'	Stadium: Sivas 4 Eylül Stadium; Referee: Bünyamin Gezer

December 4, 2009	Beşiktaş (Turkey)	0–0	(Turkey) Diyarbakırspor	Istanbul, Turkey
		Report		Stadium: BJK İnönü Stadium; Referee: Bülent Yıldırım

December 13, 2009	Vestel Manisaspor (Turkey)	1–1	(Turkey) Beşiktaş	Manisa, Turkey
	Kalabane 32'	Report	Bobô 24'	Stadium: Manisa 19 Mayıs Stadium; Referee: Selçuk Dereli

December 18, 2009	Beşiktaş (Turkey)	2–3	(Turkey) Bursaspor	Istanbul, Turkey
	Nobre 56'; Bobô 63'	Report	İpek 19'; Ergić 85'; Zápotočný 88'	Stadium: BJK İnönü Stadium; Referee: Tolga Özkalfa

=== Second half ===
January 23, 2010^{2}	Beşiktaş (Turkey)	2–0	(Turkey) İstanbul B.B.	Istanbul, Turkey
	Bobo 43'; Hološko 62'	report		Stadium: BJK İnönü Stadium; Referee: Yunus Yıldırım

January 29, 2010	Antalyaspor (Turkey)	0–1	(Turkey) Beşiktaş	Antalya, Turkey
		Report	Bobô 55'	Stadium: Antalya Atatürk Stadium; Referee: Özgüç Türkalp

February 5, 2010	Beşiktaş (Turkey)	4–1	(Turkey) Gençlerbirliği	Istanbul, Turkey
	Sivok 33'; Bobô 78'; Hološko 80'; Tabata 87'	report	Meriç 52'	Stadium: BJK İnönü Stadium; Referee: Bünyamin Gezer

February 13, 2010	Gaziantepspor (Turkey)	2–0	(Turkey) Beşiktaş	Gaziantep, Turkey
	Júlio César 10'; Deumi 51'	report		Stadium: Antep Kamil Ocak; Referee: Kuddusi Müftüoğlu

February 21, 2010	Beşiktaş (Turkey)	1–1	(Turkey) Galatasaray	Istanbul, Turkey
	Sivok 82'	report	Turan 68'	Stadium: BJK İnönü Stadium; Referee: Fırat Aydınus

February 27, 2010	Kayserispor (Turkey)	1–2	(Turkey) Beşiktaş	Kayseri, Turkey
	Makukula 81'	report	Tello 2'; Dağ 30'	Stadium: Kayseri Kadir Has Stadium; Referee: İlker Meral

Beşiktaş (Turkey)	3–0	(Turkey) Ankaraspor^{1}

March 15, 2010	Denizlispor (Turkey)	0–1	(Turkey) Beşiktaş	Denizli, Turkey
		report	41' Hološko	Stadium: Denizli Atatürk Stadium; Referee: Abdullah Yılmaz

March 19, 2010	Kasımpaşa (Turkey)	2–2	(Turkey) Beşiktaş	Istanbul, Turkey
	Güleç 62'; Aygüneş 86'	report	Tello 74'; Bobô 77'	Stadium: Recep Tayyip Erdoğan Stadium; Referee: Özgür Yankaya

March 28, 2010	Beşiktaş (Turkey)	3–2	(Turkey) Eskişehirspor	Istanbul, Turkey
	Kahveci 31'; Bobô 59'; Hološko 73'	report	Karan 3', 20' (pen.)	Stadium: BJK İnönü Stadium; Referee: Halis Özkahya

April 2, 2010	Ankaragücü (Turkey)	0–0	(Turkey) Beşiktaş	Ankara, Turkey
		report		Stadium: Ankara 19 Mayıs Stadium; Referee: Barış Şimşek

April 10, 2010	Beşiktaş (Turkey)	0–0	(Turkey) Trabzonspor	Istanbul, Turkey
		report		Stadium: BJK İnönü Stadium; Referee: Bünyamin Gezer

April 18, 2010	Fenerbahçe (Turkey)	1–0	(Turkey) Beşiktaş	Istanbul, Turkey
	Alex 2'	report		Stadium: Şükrü Saracoğlu Stadium; Referee: Hüseyin Göçek

April 24, 2010	Beşiktaş (Turkey)	2–2	(Turkey) Sivasspor	Istanbul, Turkey
	Bobô 59'; Hološko 81'	report	Yılmaz 54'; Kamanan 86'	Stadium: BJK İnönü Stadium; Referee: Kuddusi Müftüoğlu

May 2, 2010	Diyarbakırspor (Turkey)	1–3	(Turkey) Beşiktaş	Diyarbakır, Turkey
	Tazemeta 47'	report	Toraman 25'; Çetin 66' (o.g.); Tello 83'	Stadium: Diyarbakır Atatürk Stadium; Attendance: 0 Referee: Halis Özkahya

May 9, 2010	Beşiktaş (Turkey)	2–0	(Turkey) Vestel Manisaspor	Istanbul, Turkey
	Kahveci 69'	report	Tok 71' (o.g.)	Stadium: BJK İnönü Stadium; Referee: Özgür Yankaya

May 16, 2010	Bursaspor (Turkey)	2–1	(Turkey) Beşiktaş	Bursa, Turkey
	Batalla 32'; Toraman 44' (o.g.)	report	İnceman 88'	Stadium: Bursa Atatürk Stadium; Referee: Cüneyt Çakır

- ^{1}Ankaraspor was regulated to the Bank Asya 1. Lig. 3–0 default win.
- ^{2}Due to heavy snowfall this match was postponed to 10 March 2010.

=== Final standings ===
Pos	Team	Pld	W	D	L	GF	GA	GD	Pts	Qualification or relegation
2	Fenerbahçe	34	23	5	6	61	28	+33	74	Qualification to Champions League third qualifying round
3	Galatasaray	34	19	7	8	61	35	+26	64 (Note: Galatasaray finished ahead of Beşiktaş on head-to-head record: Galatasaray–Beşiktaş 3–0, Beşiktaş–Galatasaray 1–1.)	Qualification to Europa League third qualifying round
4	Beşiktaş	34	18	10	6	47	25	+22	64	Qualification to Europa League second qualifying round
5	Trabzonspor	34	16	9	9	53	32	+21	57	Qualification to Europa League play-off round (Note: Trabzonspor won the 2009–10 Turkish Cup and thus qualified for the play-off round of the UEFA Europa League.)
6	İstanbul B.B.	34	16	8	10	47	44	+3	56	

Source: Süper Lig official website
Rules for classification: 1st overall points, 2nd head-to-head points, 3rd head-to-head goal differential, 4th overall goal differential, 5th overall goals scored.

== Turkish Cup ==
Beşiktaş J.K. participated in the Turkish Super Cup as the defending champions. By finishing the Turkish Super League in 1st place last year, Beşiktaş automatically qualified to the group stages. After losing their first 3 games Beşiktaş was eliminated from the cup.

=== Group stage ===
Pos	Team	Pld	W	D	L	GF	GA	GD	Pts
1	İstanbul B.B.	4	3	1	0	4	0	+4	10
2	Manisaspor	4	2	2	0	4	2	+2	8
3	Kasımpaşa	4	1	1	2	5	6	−1	4
4	Beşiktaş	4	1	0	3	6	8	−2	3
5	Konya Şekerspor	4	1	0	3	4	7	−3	3

Source: tff.org (in Turkish)
Rules for classification: 1) points; 2) goal difference; 3) number of goals scored.

December 22, 2009	Vestel Manisaspor (Turkey)	2–1	(Turkey) Beşiktaş	Manisa, Turkey
	Simpson 32'; Keleş 61'	Report	Bobô 48'	Stadium: Manisa 19 Mayıs Stadium; Referee: Hüseyin Göçek

January 12, 2010	Beşiktaş (Turkey)	1–3	(Turkey) Kasımpaşa	Istanbul, Turkey
	Şimşek 43'	report	Açıl 7'; İşler 21'; Moritz 26'	Stadium: BJK İnönü Stadium; Referee: Koray Gençerler

January 16, 2010	İstanbul B.B. (Turkey)	1–0	(Turkey) Beşiktaş	Istanbul, Turkey
	Alın 49'	Report		Stadium: Atatürk Olympic Stadium; Referee: Kuddusi Müftüoğlu

January 26, 2010	Beşiktaş (Turkey)	4–2	(Turkey) Konya Şekerspor	Istanbul, Turkey
	Nobre 3, 21'; Kahveci 16', 85'	Report	Aksu 26'; Uysal 44'	Stadium: BJK İnönü Stadium; Referee: Hakan Özkan

== UEFA Champions League ==
Beşiktaş qualified for the UEFA Champions League by becoming the champion of the Turkish Super League last year. Beşiktaş was seeded in group D along with Manchester United (England), CSKA Moscow (Russia) and Wolfsburg (Germany).

=== Group stage ===
Pos	Team	Pld	W	D	L	GF	GA	GD	Pts	Qualification	MUN	CSKA	WOL	BES
1	(England) Manchester United	6	4	1	1	10	6	+4	13	Advance to knockout phase	—	3–3	2–1	0–1
2	(Russia) CSKA Moscow	6	3	1	2	10	10	0	10	Advance to knockout phase	0–1	—	2–1	2–1
3	(Germany) VfL Wolfsburg	6	2	1	3	9	8	+1	7	Transfer to Europa League	1–3	3–1	—	0–0
4	(Turkey) Beşiktaş	6	1	1	4	3	8	−5	4		0–1	1–2	0–3	—

Source: RSSSF

September 15, 2009	Beşiktaş (Turkey)	0–1	(England) Manchester United	Istanbul, Turkey
		Report	Scholes 77'	Stadium: BJK İnönü Stadium; Attendance: 26,448; Referee: Nicola Rizzoli (Italy)

September 30, 2009	CSKA Moscow (Russia)	2–1	(Turkey) Beşiktaş	Moscow, Russia
	Dzagoev 7'; Krasić 61'	Report	Dağ 90+2'	Stadium: Luzhniki Stadium; Attendance: 19,750; Referee: Manuel Mejuto González (Spain)

October 21, 2009	Wolfsburg (Germany)	0–0	(Turkey) Beşiktaş	Wolfsburg, Germany
		Report		Stadium: Volkswagen Arena; Attendance: 25,778; Referee: Roberto Rosetti (Italy)

November 25, 2009	Beşiktaş (Turkey)	0–3	(Germany) Wolfsburg	Istanbul, Turkey
		Report	Misimović 14'; Gentner 80'; Džeko 87'	Stadium: BJK İnönü Stadium; Attendance: 18,116; Referee: Alberto Undiano Mallenco (Spain)

November 25, 2009	Manchester United (England)	0–1	(Turkey) Beşiktaş	Manchester, England
		Report	Tello 20'	Stadium: Old Trafford; Attendance: 74,242; Referee: Stéphane Lannoy (France)

December 8, 2009	Beşiktaş (Turkey)	1–2	(Russia) CSKA Moscow	Istanbul, Turkey
	Bobô 86'	Report	Krasić 41'; Aldonin 90+5'	Stadium: BJK İnönü Stadium; Attendance: 16,129; Referee: Martin Hansson (Sweden)
