= Mohammad Naderi =

Iranian footballer

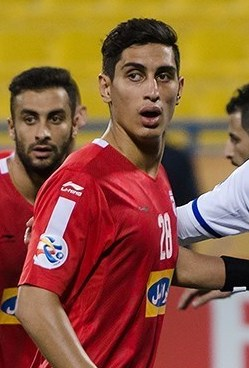
- Naderi with Tractor in 2018

Personal information
- Full name: Mohammad Naderi
- Date of birth: October 5, 1996 (age 30)
- Place of birth: Qazvin, Iran
- Height: 1.88 m (6 ft 2 in)
- Positions: Left back; centre back

Team information
- Current team: Tractor
- Number: 22

Youth career
- –2014: Saipa
- 2014–2016: Moghavemat Tehran

Senior career*
Years	Team	Apps	(Gls)
2016–2018	Tractor	26	(0)
2017	→ Nassaji Mazandaran (loan)	10	(1)
2018–2020	Kortrijk	0	(0)
2019–2020	→ Persepolis (loan)	31	(0)
2020–2021	Esteghlal	23	(1)
2021–2023	Altay	54	(3)
2023–	Tractor	73	(2)

International career^{‡}
2019–	Iran	3	(0)
Medal record
Representing Iran
CAFA Nations Cup
Runner-up	2025 Tajikistan–Uzbekistan	Team
- * Club domestic league appearances and goals as of 26 February 2026 ‡ National team caps and goals as of 1 September 2025

Mohammad Naderi (Persian: محمد نادری; born October 5, 1996) is an Iranian footballer who plays as a defender for Tractor in the Persian Gulf Pro League and the Iran national team.

== Club career ==
=== K.V. Kortrijk ===
In 2018, he left tractor manufacturing and left for Europe. He chose Kortrijk and joined the team on a four-year contract. From this team, he played on loan for two years for Perspolis Football Club

=== Esteghlal ===
He joined Esteghlal Tehran Football Club in November 2020 with a one-year contract. Later, he scored in two consecutive games in the AFC Champions League against Al-AhlI of Saudi Arabia and Al-Shorta of Iraq, and gained more popularity among Esteghlal fans.

=== Altay ===
On 13 August 2021, Naderi officially joined Turkish outfit Altay. He debuted for the club just a day later, playing against Kayserispor in a 3–0 win.

== Club career statistics ==
As of 14 April 2026

Club	Division	Season	League		Cup		Continental		Total	
Club	Division	Season	Apps	Goals	Apps	Goals	Apps	Goals	Apps	Goals
Nassaji (loan)	Azadegan League	2016–17	10	1	0	0	_		10	1
Kortrijk	Belgian First Division A	2018–19	0	0	0	0	_		0	0
Persepolis (loan)	Pro League	2018–19	13	0	3	0	6	0	22	0
Persepolis (loan)	Pro League	2019–20	18	0	4	0	1	0	23	0
Persepolis (loan)	Total		31	0	7	0	7	0	45	0
Esteghlal	Pro League	2020–21	23	1	5	0	4	2	32	3
Altay SK	Super Lig	2021–22	24	1	1	0	_		25	1
Altay SK	1.Lig	2022–23	30	2	0	0	_		30	2
Altay SK	Total		54	3	1	0	0	0	55	3
Tractor	Pro League	2016–17	1	0	1	0	_		2	0
Tractor	Pro League	2017–18	25	0	3	0	6	0	34	0
Tractor	Pro League	2023–24	24	1	2	0	_		26	1
Tractor	Pro League	2024–25	28	1	1	0	8	0	37	1
Tractor	Pro League	2025–26	21	0	1	0	7+1	0	30	0
Tractor	Total Tractor		99	2	8	0	21+1	0	129	2
Career total			217	7	21	0	32+1	2	271	9

- +: other

== International career ==
He made his debut against Iraq on 14 November 2019 in the World Cup qualification.

=== International ===
As of match played on 1 September 2025

Appearances and goals by national team and year
National team	Year	Apps	Goals
Iran	2019	1	0
Iran	2025	2	0
Total		3	0

== Honours ==
Tractor

- Persian Gulf Pro League: 2024–25
- Hazfi Cup Runner-up: 2016–17
- Iranian Super Cup: 2025

Persepolis

- Persian Gulf Pro League (2): 2018–19, 2019–20
- Hazfi Cup (1): 2018–19
- Iranian Super Cup (1): 2019

Esteghlal

- Hazfi Cup Runner-up: 2020–21
