= Eric Björkander =

Swedish footballer

Personal information
- Full name: Nils Eric Roland Björkander
- Date of birth: 11 June 1996 (age 30)
- Place of birth: Karlskrona, Sweden
- Height: 1.82 m (5 ft 11 1/2 in)
- Position: Defender

Team information
- Current team: IF Brommapojkarna
- Number: 4

Youth career
- Rödeby AIF
- –2012: Lyckeby GoIF
- 2012–2014: Mjällby

Senior career*
Years	Team	Apps	(Gls)
2014–2015	Mjällby	28	(1)
2016–2020	Sundsvall	77	(1)
2020–2021	Mjällby	34	(2)
2021–2023	Altay	53	(2)
2023	Istra 1961	5	(0)
2024–	IF Brommapojkarna	30	(1)

International career
2015	Sweden U19	1	(0)
- * Club domestic league appearances and goals as of 12 November 2025

Eric Björkander (born 11 June 1996) is a Swedish footballer who currently plays for IF Brommapojkarna as a defender.

== Club career ==
On 17 July 2023, Björkander signed a two-year contract with Istra 1961 in Croatia. On 18 December 2023, Björkander and the Croatian club parted ways, with the defender having featured in 5 league games.
