= Efe Sarıkaya =

Turkish footballer (born 2005)

Personal information
- Date of birth: 30 November 2005 (age 20)
- Place of birth: İzmir, Turkey
- Height: 1.85 m (6 ft 1 in)
- Positions: Centre-back; left-back

Team information
- Current team: Gaziantep

Youth career
- 2014–2017: Altay
- 2017–2018: Çamdibi Yeşilova Esnafspor
- 2018–2022: Altay

Senior career*
Years	Team	Apps	(Gls)
2022–2024	Altay	42	(0)
2024–2026	Grenoble	12	(0)
2026–	→ Çorum (loan)	2	(0)
2026–	Gaziantep	0	(0)

International career^{‡}
2022	Turkey U18	5	(0)
2022–2024	Turkey U19	18	(4)
2024	Turkey U20	4	(0)
- * Club domestic league appearances and goals as of 28 August 2026 ‡ National team caps and goals as of 19 November 2024

Efe Sarıkaya (born 30 November 2005) is a Turkish professional footballer who plays as a centre-back for Süper Lig club Gaziantep.

== Club career ==
Born in İzmir, Sarıkaya began his footballing career with Altay, and remained there for his entire youth career, apart from a short stint with Çamdibi Yeşilova Esnafspor in the 2017–2018 season.

Sarıkaya made his professional debut at the end of the 2021–22 Süper Lig season, coming on as a late substitute for Kazımcan Karataş in a 2–1 away loss to Trabzonspor on 15 May 2022. With Altay already effectively relegated, he was given one further game in May 2022, playing the full 90 minutes in a 4–2 home loss to Kasımpaşa. The following season, he was included in the team's pre-season training as they prepared for the 2022–23 TFF First League season. He signed a professional contract with the club in February 2022, keeping him with the club until 2024.

In September 2022, following impressive performances for Altay in the Turkish second tier, he was linked with Turkish clubs Beşiktaş, Galatasaray and Fenerbahçe. His performances would then catch the eye of Spanish club Atlético Madrid in December of the same year, with the club reportedly conveying their interest in writing to Altay. In January 2023, he expressed that his priority was to continue at Altay, despite the interest from a number of clubs.

Atlético Madrid followed up their interest in Sarıkaya in April 2023, with Altay manager Tuna Üzümcü claiming that the club had received an official offer from Atlético, as well as fellow Spanish side Sevilla and English Premier League side Manchester City, with the Turkish side rejecting all three bids.

On 1 February 2024, Sarıkaya signed a five-year contract with Grenoble.

On 4 September 2026, Sarıkaya moved to Gaziantep on a two-season contract.

== International career ==
Sarıkaya has represented Turkey at under-18 and under-19 levels. Following a call-up to the under-18 side in August 2022, Altay's then-sporting director Tuna Üzümcü expressed his pride in Sarıkaya for representing his nation while playing for the club. However, Altay, did not allow him to attend a training camp with the under-19 squad in October 2022, as they saw him as a crucial player in their bid to return to the Süper Lig.

== Style of play ==
A left-footed defender, Sarıkaya operates mostly at centre-back, although he has been played as a left-back in some instances.

== Career statistics ==
=== Club ===
As of 7 April 2023

Appearances and goals by club, season and competition
Club	Season	League			Cup		Other		Total	
Club	Season	Division	Apps	Goals	Apps	Goals	Apps	Goals	Apps	Goals
Altay	2021–22	Süper Lig	2	0	0	0	0	0	2	0
Altay	2022–23	TFF 1. Lig	23	0	0	0	0	0	23	0
Career total			25	0	0	0	0	0	25	0
