= Cihan Yılmaz =

Turkish footballer

Personal information
- Full name: Cihan Yılmaz
- Date of birth: 15 June 1983 (age 43)
- Place of birth: Tokat, Turkey
- Height: 1.78 m (5 ft 10 in)
- Position: Midfielder

Youth career
- SG Wattenscheid 09
- SC Westfalia Herne

Senior career*
| Years | Team | Apps | (Gls) |
| 2003–2004 | Rot Weiss Ahlen | 2 | (0) |
| 2004–2005 | Preußen Münster | 34 | (4) |
| 2005 | Berlin AK 07 | 8 | (1) |
| 2006–2007 | SV Wehen Wiesbaden | 11 | (0) |
| 2007–2009 | Karşıyaka | 66 | (14) |
| 2009–2012 | Sivasspor | 50 | (11) |
| 2012 | Karşıyaka | 16 | (3) |
| 2012–2013 | Boluspor | 23 | (2) |
| 2013–2015 | Göztepe | 38 | (12) |
| 2015 | İnegölspor | 16 | (2) |
| 2015–2019 | Rot Weiss Ahlen | 117 | (51) |
| Total | | 381 | (100) |
- * Club domestic league appearances and goals

Cihan Yılmaz (born 15 June 1983) is a Turkish former professional footballer who played as a midfielder.

== Club career ==
Born in Turkey, Yılmaz began his career in Germany. He played for several German clubs, including SC Westfalia Herne, Rot Weiss Ahlen, SC Preußen Münster, Berlin AK 07, and SV Wehen Wiesbaden. He was signed by Karşıyaka in 2007, and later moved to Sivasspor in July 2009.
