= Eren Erdoğan =

Turkish footballer

Personal information
- Date of birth: 22 May 2001 (age 25)
- Place of birth: İzmir, Turkey
- Height: 1.75 m (5 ft 9 in)
- Position: Winger

Team information
- Current team: Fethiyespor
- Number: 7

Senior career*
Years	Team	Apps	(Gls)
2019–2024	Altay	73	(6)
2020	→ Fethiyespor (loan)	1	(0)
2024–2025	Gaziantep	0	(0)
2025	→ Boluspor (loan)	12	(0)
2025–2026	Sakaryaspor	23	(2)
2026–	Fethiyespor	5	(9)
- * Club domestic league appearances and goals as of 14 November 2026

Eren Erdoğan (born 22 May 2001) is a Turkish professional footballer who plays as a winger for TFF 2. Lig club Fethiyespor.

== Career ==
A youth product of Altay, Erdoğan began his senior career with them in 2019 before going on loan with Fethiyespor. He made his professional debut for Altay in a 2–0 Süper Lig loss to Fenerbahçe on 29 August 2021.
