= İbrahim Öztürk =

Turkish footballer

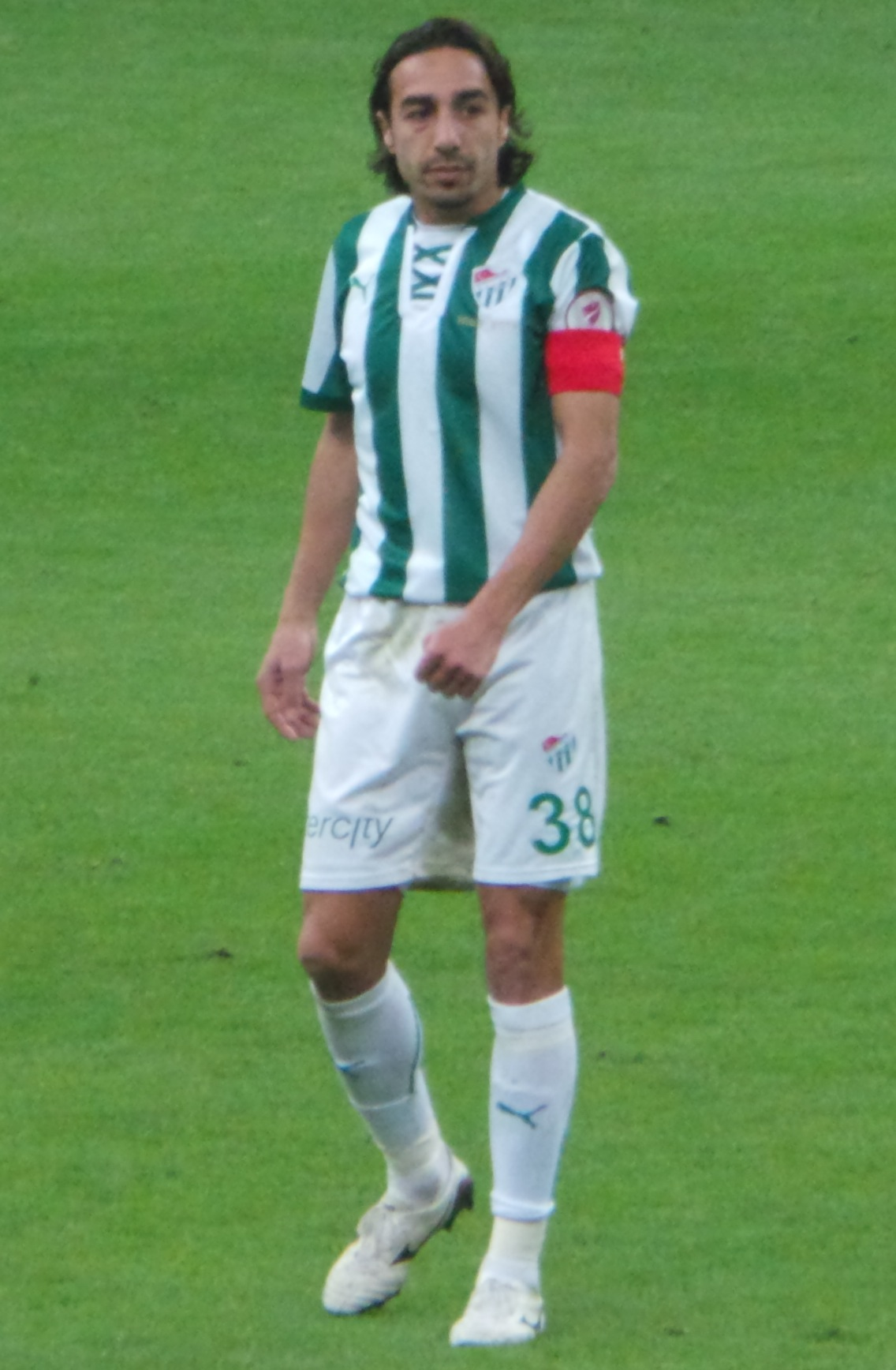

Personal information
- Date of birth: 21 June 1981 (age 45)
- Place of birth: Kayseri, Turkey
- Height: 1.86 m (6 ft 1 in)
- Position: Centre back

Team information
- Current team: Talasgücü Belediyespor

Youth career
- 2002: Kayseri Erciyesspor

Senior career*
| Years | Team | Apps | (Gls) |
| 2002–2003 | Kayseri Erciyesspor | 24 | (0) |
| 2003–2005 | Karamanspor | 41 | (3) |
| 2005–2006 | Kırıkkalespor | 28 | (5) |
| 2006–2008 | Altay | 49 | (4) |
| 2008–2015 | Bursaspor | 131 | (5) |
| 2015–2017 | Sivasspor | 65 | (1) |
| 2017–2024 | Altay | 167 | (11) |
| 2024– | Talasgücü Belediyespor | 1 | (0) |
- * Club domestic league appearances and goals as of 4 February 2024

İbrahim Öztürk (born 21 June 1981) is a Turkish footballer who plays as a central defender for TFF Third League club Talasgücü Belediyespor. He started his career at Kayseri Erciyesspor, in his birthplace of Kayseri, played in all professional leagues governed by the Turkish Football Federation and won promotional or direct league titles via playoff. He was with Süper Lig champions Bursaspor in the 2009–10 season.

== Honours ==
Karamanspor

- TFF Third League: 2003–04

Bursaspor

- Süper Lig: 2009–10

Sivasspor

- TFF First League: 2016–17

Altay

- TFF Second League: 2017–18
- TFF First League (Play-offs): 2020–21
