= Tolga Ünlü =

German footballer

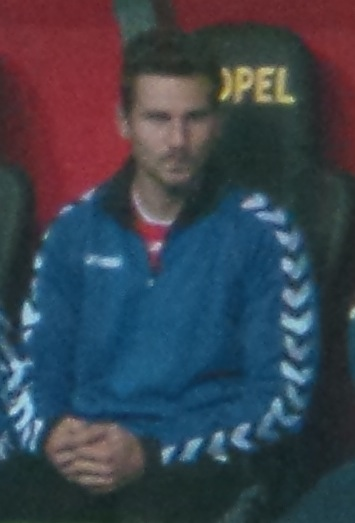

Personal information
- Date of birth: 10 September 1989 (age 37)
- Place of birth: Erlenbach am Main, West Germany
- Height: 1.80 m (5 ft 11 in)
- Position: Right back

Team information
- Current team: Beykoz Anadoluspor
- Number: 14

Youth career
- BSC Elsenfeld
- Viktoria Mömlingen
- Viktoria Aschaffenburg

Senior career*
| Years | Team | Apps | (Gls) |
| 2009–2011 | Viktoria Aschaffenburg | 22 | (0) |
| 2011–2015 | Konyaspor | 64 | (0) |
| 2015–2017 | Akhisar Belediyespor | 27 | (0) |
| 2017–2019 | BB Erzurumspor | 48 | (0) |
| 2019–2020 | Akhisarspor | 30 | (0) |
| 2020–2024 | Altay | 90 | (0) |
| 2024 | Şanlıurfaspor | 8 | (0) |
| 2024– | Beykoz Anadoluspor | 3 | (0) |
- * Club domestic league appearances and goals as of 3 November 2024

Tolga Ünlü (born 10 September 1989) is a German professional footballer who plays as a defender for Turkish club Beykoz Anadoluspor. He is a youth product of Viktoria Aschaffenburg.
