= Rıdvan Şimşek =

Turkish footballer

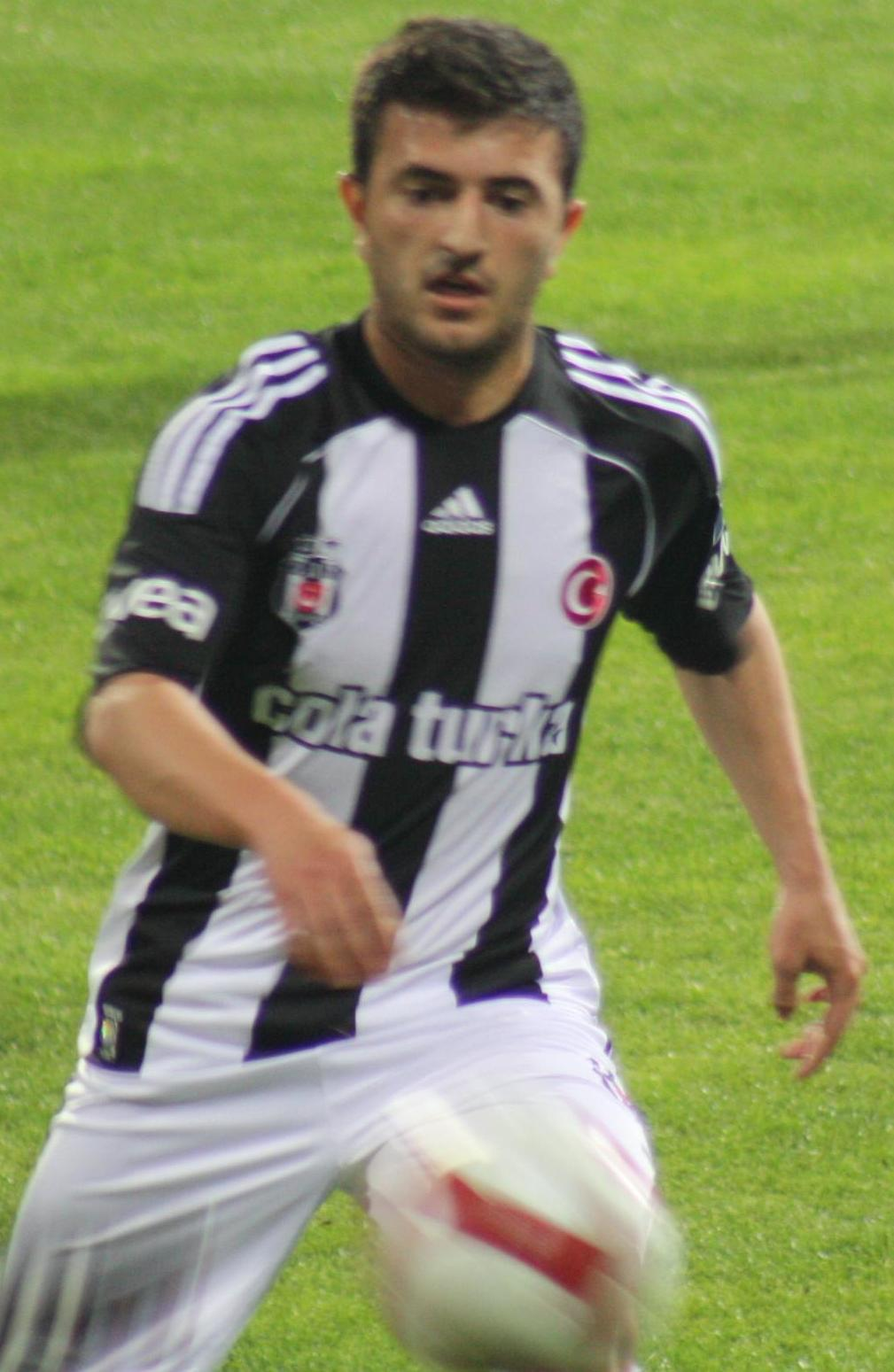
- Şimşek playing for Beşiktaş.

Personal information
- Date of birth: 17 January 1991 (age 35)
- Place of birth: Konak, İzmir, Turkey
- Height: 1.73 m (5 ft 8 in)
- Positions: Right back; right winger

Team information
- Current team: İzmirspor
- Number: 25

Youth career
- 2005–2008: Karşıyaka

Senior career*
Years	Team	Apps	(Gls)
2008–2009	Karşıyaka	27	(0)
2009–2012	Beşiktaş	7	(0)
2011	→ Karabükspor (loan)	2	(0)
2012	→ Elazığspor (loan)	12	(0)
2012–2013	Gaziantepspor	0	(0)
2013–2015	Karşıyaka	52	(1)
2015–2016	Antalyaspor	16	(1)
2017–2018	Sivasspor	24	(1)
2018–2019	Gazişehir Gaziantep	22	(1)
2019	Keçiörengücü	3	(0)
2020	İstanbulspor	10	(0)
2020–2021	Altay	9	(0)
2022–	İzmirspor	0	(0)

International career
2009	Turkey U18	4	(0)
2008–2009	Turkey U19	8	(0)
2009–2012	Turkey U21	6	(0)
2013	Turkey A2	2	(1)
- * Club domestic league appearances and goals as of 11:59, 19 January 2022 (UTC)

Rıdvan Şimşek (born 17 January 1991) is a Turkish professional footballer who plays as a right wingback for İzmirspor.

== Career ==
=== Early years ===
Named by his father, inspired by Rıdvan Dilmen, a prominent striker in Turkish football history, Şimşek began his career with Karşıyaka at the age of 12. He made his professional debut at the age of 17 in a TFF First League match against Kasımpaşa S.K. in September 2008, and became a regular member of the team.

=== Beşiktaş ===
Şimşek joined Beşiktaş in June 2009 for 1.25 million TRY. He played seven games for them in the Süper Lig. He was loaned to Karabükspor and Elazığspor in the 2011-12 season.

=== Gaziantepspor ===
He was transferred to Gaziantepspor in summer 2012.

=== Back to Karşıyaka ===
He returned to Karşıyaka in summer 2013.
