= Uğur İnceman =

Turkish footballer

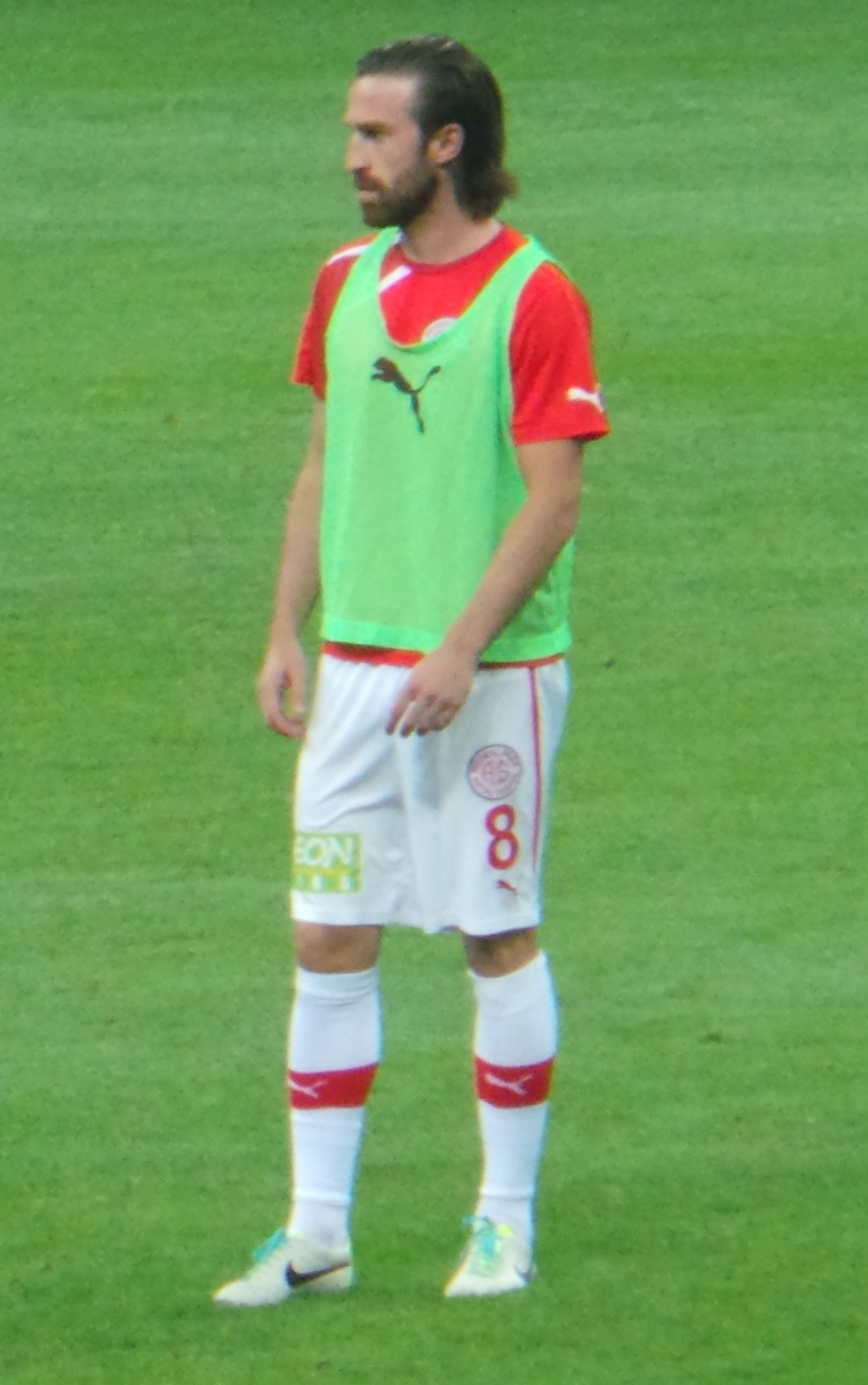
- İnceman with Antalyaspor in 2013

Personal information
- Date of birth: 25 May 1981 (age 45)
- Place of birth: Aachen, West Germany
- Height: 1.83 m (6 ft 0 in)
- Position: Midfielder

Youth career
- Blau-Weiß Aachen
- DJK Arminia Eilendorf
- Alemannia Aachen

Senior career*
| Years | Team | Apps | (Gls) |
| 1999–2001 | Alemannia Aachen | 53 | (5) |
| 2001–2003 | FC St. Pauli | 48 | (2) |
| 2003–2004 | Greuther Fürth | 13 | (1) |
| 2004–2008 | Manisaspor | 96 | (10) |
| 2008–2010 | Beşiktaş | 40 | (3) |
| 2010–2014 | Antalyaspor | 119 | (10) |
| 2014–2016 | Konyaspor | 36 | (2) |
| 2016 | Roda JC Kerkrade | 16 | (1) |
| 2016–2018 | Eskişehirspor | 46 | (0) |
| Total | | 467 | (34) |

International career
| 2000 | Turkey U19 | 1 | (0) |
| 2000–2003 | Turkey U21 | 19 | (0) |
| 2005 | Turkey B | 1 | (0) |
| 2004 | Turkey | 1 | (0) |
- * Club domestic league appearances and goals

Uğur İnceman (born 25 May 1981) is a former professional footballer who played as a midfielder. Born in Germany, he represented the Turkey national team.

== Club career ==
İnceman was born in Aachen, West Germany. His childhood nickname is Iceman. He is good friends with former player Vikash Dhorasoo.

In 2008 Beşiktaş paid Manisaspor $1,750,000 plus two players in exchange for İnceman. He played 40 league games for Beşiktaş where he scored 3 goals. In one and a half seasons with Konyaspor between 2014 and 2015, İnceman played in 36 Süper Lig encounters, scoring two goals and assisting for another two.

At 34 years of age, he joined Roda JC on 7 January 2015.

== International career ==
İnceman earned his first and only senior cap for Turkey in a friendly game away against Denmark, ended 1–0 for Denmark, on 18 February 2004.

== Style of play ==
İnceman was known for his mental attributes such as his anticipation to read the game on the pitch and his creativity specially on passes through the opponents' defences.
