= Ozan Evrim Özenç =

Turkish footballer

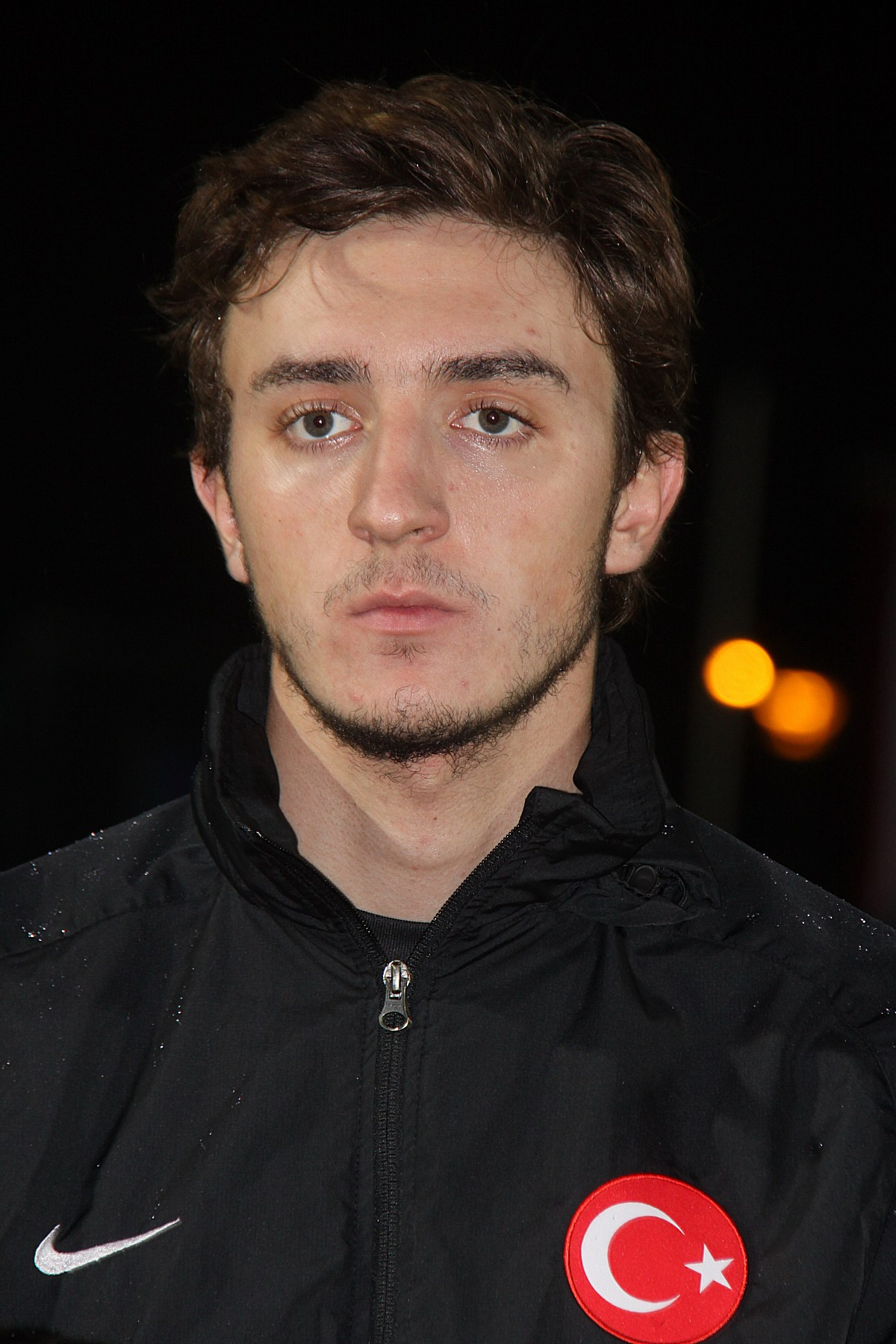
- Özenç with Turkey U21 in 2013

Personal information
- Full name: Ozan Evrim Özenç
- Date of birth: 7 January 1993 (age 33)
- Place of birth: Konak, Turkey
- Height: 1.90 m (6 ft 3 in)
- Position: Goalkeeper

Team information
- Current team: Altay
- Number: 1

Youth career
- 2005–2010: Denizlispor

Senior career*
Years	Team	Apps	(Gls)
2009–2011	Denizlispor A2	36	(0)
2010–2014	Denizlispor	18	(0)
2011–2012	→ Denizli BBSK (loan)	2	(0)
2014–2019	Antalyaspor	22	(0)
2019–2020	Boluspor	1	(0)
2020–2026	Altay	54	(0)

International career
2009–2010	Turkey U17	3	(0)
2010–2011	Turkey U18	5	(0)
2011–2012	Turkey U19	8	(0)
2013	Turkey U20	1	(0)
2013	Turkey U21	2	(0)
- * Club domestic league appearances and goals as of 2 May 2026

Ozan Evrim Özenç (born 7 January 1993 in Konak) is a Turkish footballer who plays as a goalkeeper for Altay.
