= Özgür Özkaya =

Turkish footballer

Özgür
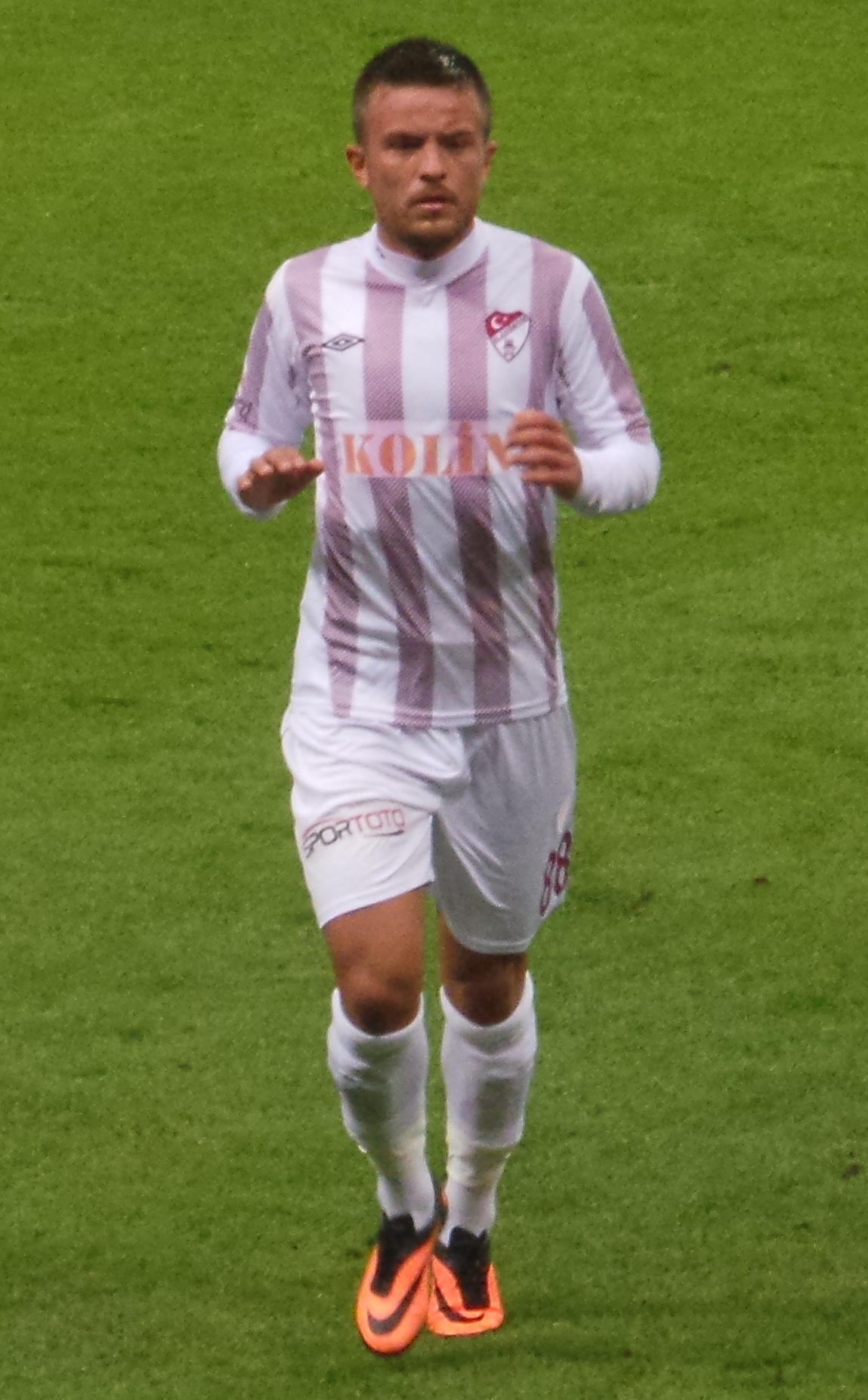

Personal information
- Full name: Özgür Özkaya
- Date of birth: 8 February 1988 (age 38)
- Place of birth: Istanbul
- Position: Defender

Team information
- Current team: Altay
- Number: 88

Youth career
- İstanbul Gençlerbirliği
- Beşiktaş

Senior career*
Years	Team	Apps	(Gls)
2008–2013	Beşiktaş	0	(0)
2008	→ Zeytinburnuspor (loan)	10	(0)
2008–2009	→ Fatih Karagümrük (loan)	27	(0)
2009–2011	→ Beylerbeyi (loan)	51	(14)
2011–2013	→ Şanlıurfaspor (loan)	40	(4)
2013–2014	Elazığspor	16	(1)
2014–2015	Konyaspor	1	(0)
2016–2017	Boluspor	21	(0)
2017–2018	Gaziantep BB	32	(0)
2018–	Altay	97	(2)
- * Club domestic league appearances and goals as of 12 June 2023

Özgür Özkaya (born 8 February 1988) is a Turkish footballer who plays as a defender for Altay.
