= Zeki Yıldırım =

Turkish footballer

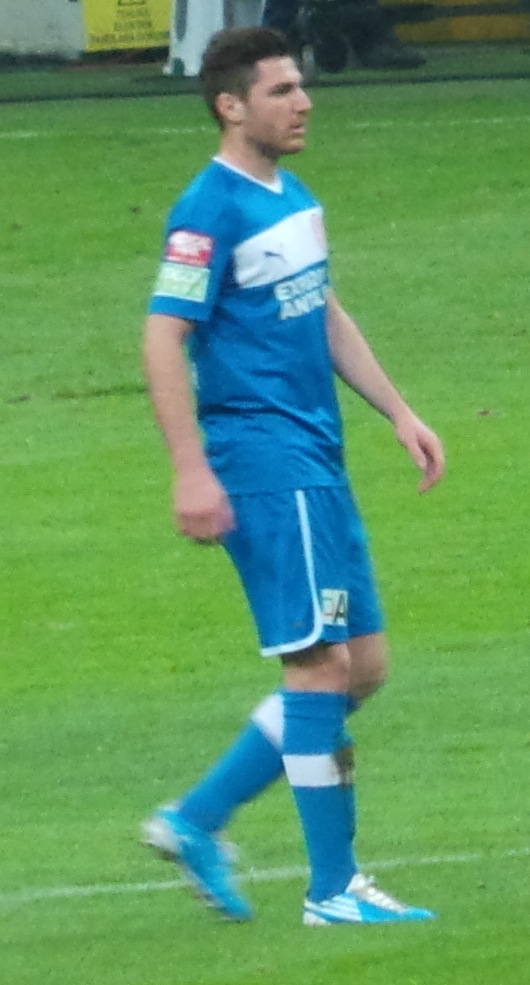

Personal information
- Date of birth: 15 January 1991 (age 35)
- Place of birth: Antalya, Turkey
- Height: 1.80 m (5 ft 11 in)
- Position: Midfielder

Senior career*
Years	Team	Apps	(Gls)
2010–2011	Antalyaspor	0	(0)
2010–2011	→ Alanyaspor (loan)	27	(0)
2011–2012	Pendikspor	24	(4)
2012–2019	Antalyaspor	122	(4)
2019–2021	Fatih Karagümrük	33	(1)
2021–2024	Altay	77	(5)
2024–2025	Bucaspor 1928	38	(5)

International career
2013	Turkey A2	3	(0)
- * Club domestic league appearances and goals as of 3 May 2025

Zeki Yıldırım (born 15 January 1991) is a Turkish footballer who plays as a midfielder. He made his Süper Lig debut against İstanbul B.B. on 1 September 2012.
