= Alsancak Mustafa Denizli Stadium =

Football stadium in İzmir, Turkey

Coordinates: 38°26′14″N 27°09′03″E

Alsancak Mustafa Denizli Stadyumu
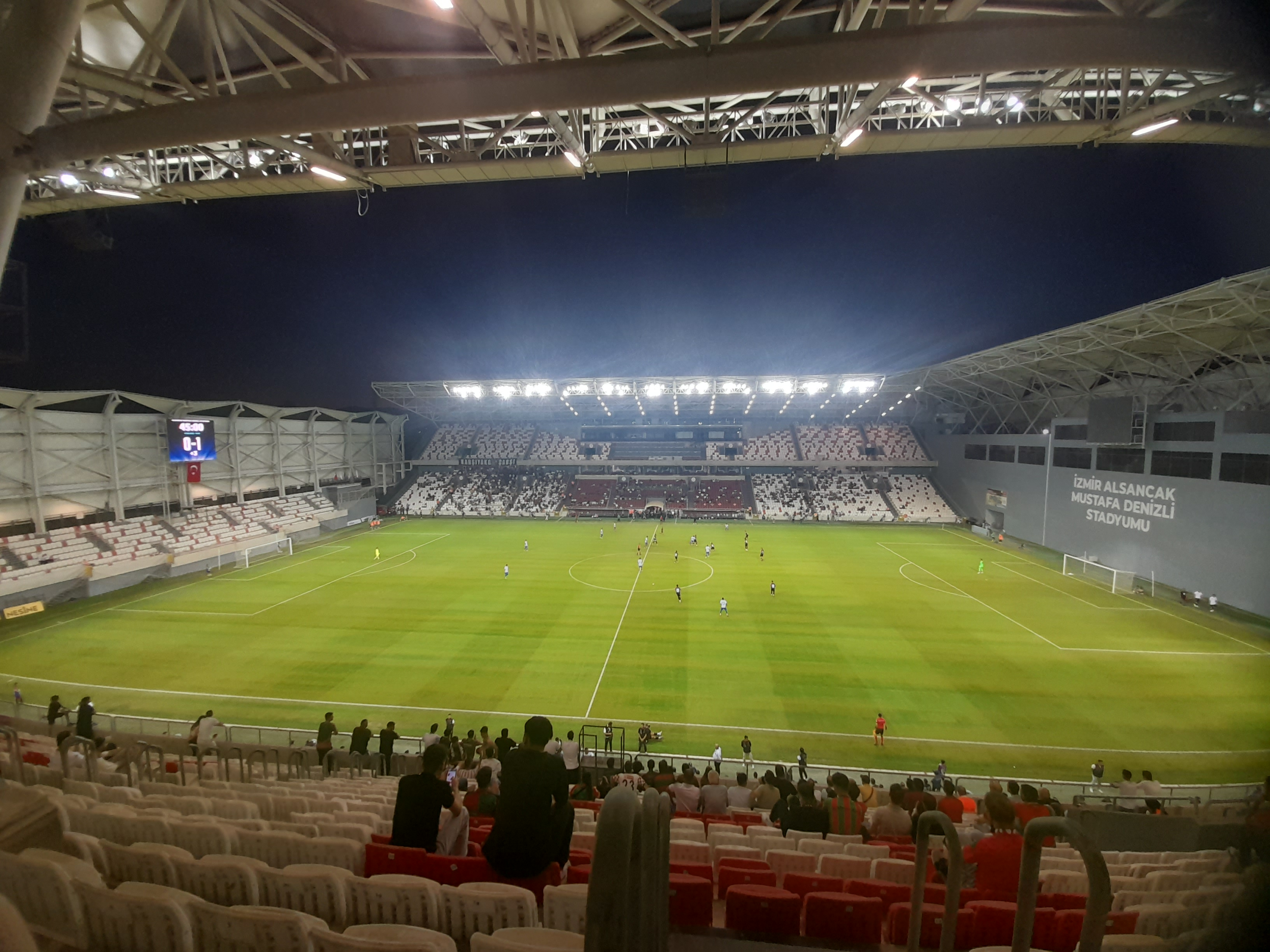
- Interactive map of Alsancak Mustafa Denizli Stadyumu
- Former names: Alsancak Stadium
- Location: Alsancak, İzmir, Turkey
- Owner: Ministry of Youth and Sports (Turkey)
- Operator: Altay S.K.
- Capacity: 15,000
- Surface: Grass

Construction
- Opened: 1929
- Renovated: 2017–2021
- Demolished: 2015

Tenant
- Altay S.K. (2021–present)

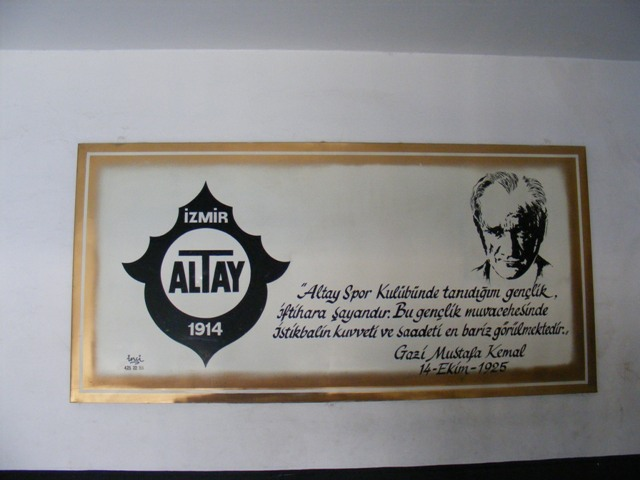
A plate with figure of Mustafa Kemal Atatürk with his state about Altay SK during a visit of himself to the club in 1925. The plate is located on an interior wall of Alsancak Stadium, Izmir

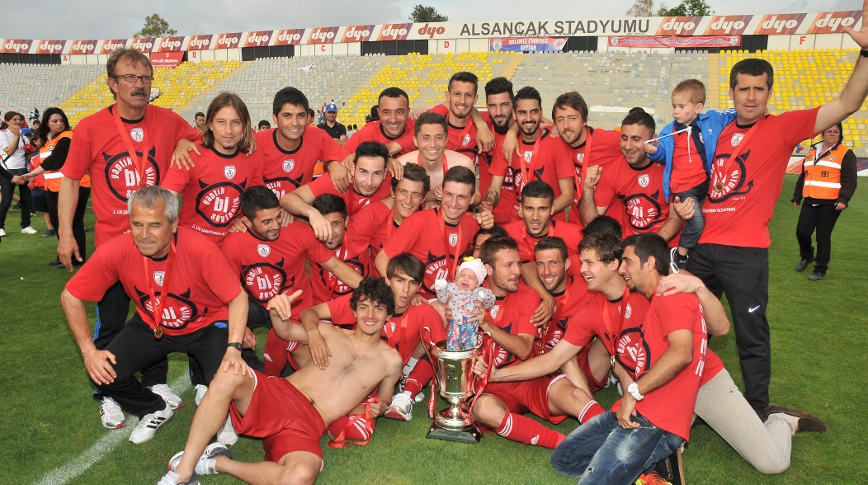
2013–14 2nd Division Red Group Champion Altınordu FK

The Alsancak Mustafa Denizli Stadium is a multi-purpose stadium in İzmir, Turkey used mostly for football matches. The stadium has a capacity of 15,000 and was built at the site of the old stadium of Greek club Panionios, in 1929. In 1959 it hosted Turkey's first-ever premiere league game. The stadium is owned by Ministry of Youth and Sports (Turkey). Due to safety concerns during a potential earthquake, the stadium was demolished in July 2015. It was rebuilt between 2017 and 2021. Opened on 26 November 2021. The name of the stadium was given by President Recep Tayyip Erdoğan in honor of Turkish football player and coach Mustafa Denizli.

The stadium has a special place in Turkish football in terms of hosting many clubs and hosting important world clubs since the first day it was opened. Although Alsancak Stadium hosted more than one club at the same time like other long-established stadiums in the past.

== History ==
Altınordu Club left its field where the current Alsancak Sports Hall and Swimming Pool is located to the state for the 1971 Mediterranean Games. For this reason, Altınordu signed a protocol with the Prime Ministry General Directorate of Physical Education in 1962 and obtained the right to use Alsancak Stadium together with Altay in return for the field it gave.

== Renovation ==
A new stadium with a capacity of 15,000 was built on the site of the old stadium, and it was completed in 2021.
