= Tuna Üzümcü =

Turkish footballer

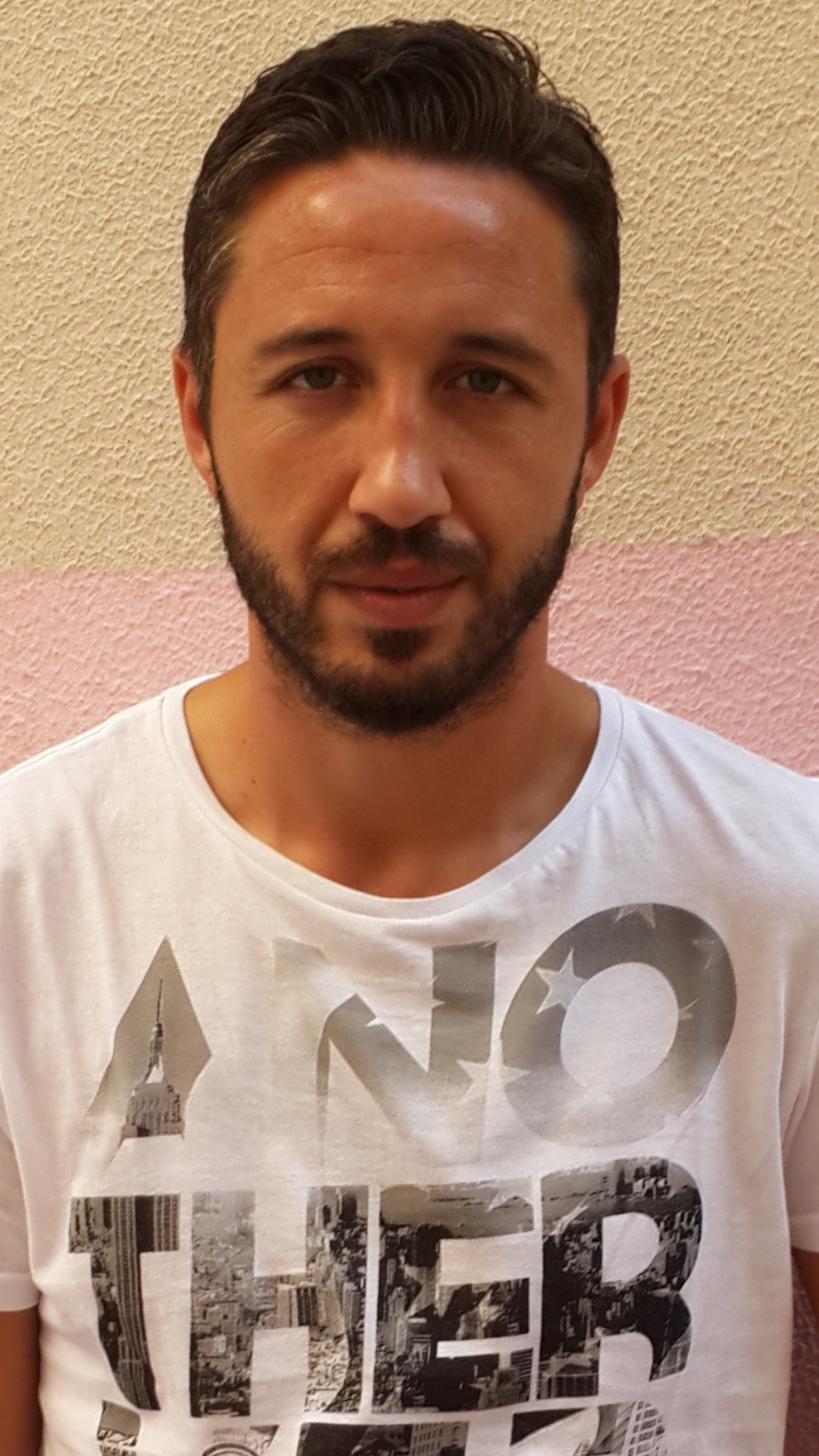

Personal information
- Full name: Ayhan Tuna Üzümcü
- Date of birth: 6 August 1982 (age 44)
- Place of birth: İzmir, Turkey
- Height: 1.85 m (6 ft 1 in)
- Position: Defender

Youth career
- 1997–1999: İzmir Belediyespor
- 1999–2001: Altay

Senior career*
Years	Team	Apps	(Gls)
2001–2005	Altay	0	(0)
2001–2002	→ Petkimspor (loan)		
2002–2003	→ Aydınspor (loan)		
2005–2008	Gençlerbirliği	71	(5)
2008–2009	Beşiktaş	0	(0)
2009–2010	Bursaspor	16	(2)
2010–2011	Antalyaspor	2	(0)
2011–2014	Adanaspor	71	(6)
2014–2015	Samsunspor	40	(0)
2015–2017	Denizlispor	15	(0)
2017–2018	Nazilli Belediyespor	24	(1)
2018	Tuzlaspor	16	(0)

Managerial career
- 2022–2023: Altay (sporting director)
- 2023: Altay
- * Club domestic league appearances and goals

Ayhan Tuna Üzümcü (born 6 August 1982) is a Turkish football manager, official and a former defender.

== Honours ==
- Bursaspor
  - Süper Lig (1): 2009–10
