= Deniz Kadah =

German-Turkish footballer (born 1986)

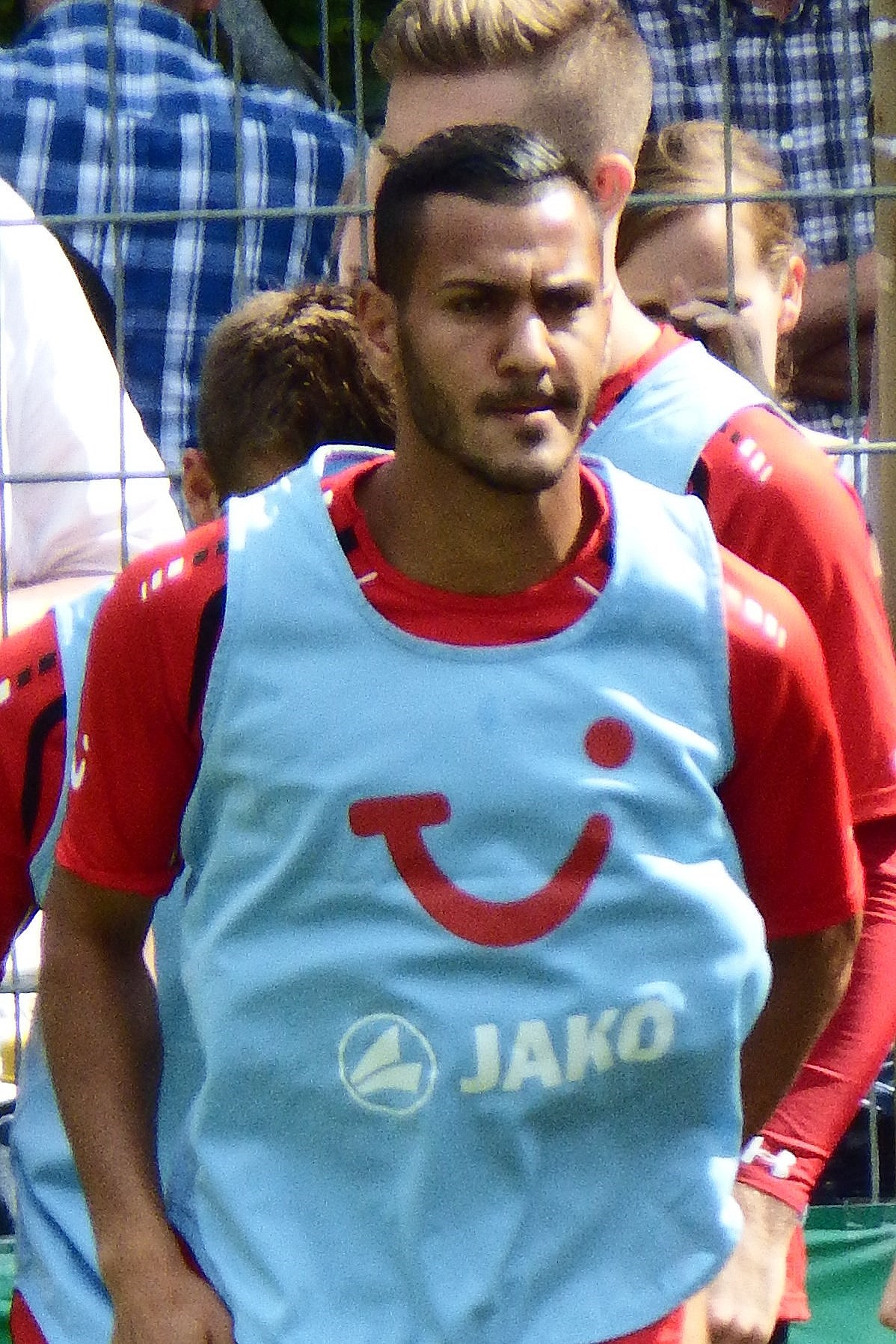
- Kadah in 2013

Personal information
- Date of birth: 2 March 1986 (age 40)
- Place of birth: Viranşehir, Turkey
- Height: 1.88 m (6 ft 2 in)
- Position: Forward

Team information
- Current team: Altay
- Number: 63

Youth career
- FC Langwedel
- FC Verden 04

Senior career*
Years	Team	Apps	(Gls)
2005–2006	Rotenburger SV	26	(8)
2006–2007	TuS Heeslingen	23	(13)
2007–2008	VfB Lübeck	28	(4)
2008–2010	Fortuna Düsseldorf	25	(3)
2011	FC Oberneuland	15	(2)
2011–2012	VfB Lübeck	23	(14)
2012–2013	Hannover 96 II	31	(30)
2013–2014	Hannover 96	5	(0)
2014–2016	Çaykur Rizespor	76	(22)
2016–2018	Antalyaspor	54	(19)
2018–2020	Göztepe	38	(7)
2021–	Altay	99	(13)
- * Club domestic league appearances and goals as of 09:08, 2 May 2026 (UTC)

Deniz Kadah (born 2 March 1986) is a Turkish professional footballer who plays as a forward for Altay.

== Personal life ==
Kadah is a Yazidi and was born in Viranşehir in Turkey and grew up in Verden in Germany. He made his debut in the first team for Bundesliga side Hannover 96 on 18 January 2013 against Schalke 04.
