= Altay S.K. =

Turkish football club

Altay
- Full name: Altay Spor Kulübü
- Nickname: Büyük Altay (Great Altay)
- Founded: 16 January 1914; 112 years ago as Hilal İdman Yurdu
- Ground: Alsancak Mustafa Denizli Stadium
- Capacity: 12,285
- President: Sinan Kanlı
- Manager: Tuna Üzümcü
- League: TFF 3. Lig
- 2025–26: TFF 3. Lig, Group 4, 12th of 16
- Website: www.altay.org.tr
| Home colours | Away colours | Third colours |

Altay Spor Kulübü is a Turkish professional football club based in the city of İzmir.

Formed in 1914, Altay are nicknamed Büyük Altay (Great Altay). The club colors are black and white, and they play their home matches at the Alsancak Mustafa Denizli Stadium.

Domestically, the club has finished third place for the Süper Lig three times and won the Turkish Cup twice. They hold the record for most İzmir Football League titles with 14. They are the most successful İzmir-based club with 16 championships in various competitions.

Collecting 24 points in the first half of the 1969–70 season in undefeated 15 games with 9 wins and 6 draws, Altay SK is one of three non-champion clubs that topped the first half of 1. Lig table, along with Kocaelispor in 1992–93, and Sivasspor in 2007–08, 2008–09 and 2019–20.

Altay achieved several firsts in Turkish football, including playing the first recorded away match by a Turkish team, against Pakser British Youth, which Altay won 4–3, and becoming the first Turkish club to participate in the UEFA Cup. The club was the first Anatolian side to finish in the top three of the national Turkish league and to win the Turkish Cup. Vahap Özaltay, who contributed to Turkish football's modernization and professionalization, took his surname from Altay. He was Turkey's first professional footballer.

== History ==
Altay holds an important place in Turkey's football history. The club played a key role in uniting the Turkish community during the Turkish War of Independence. Many Altay players and supporters lost their lives in the war. After the Surname Law was adopted, Mustafa Kemal Atatürk gave General Fahrettin Pasha the surname of "Altay" reportedly in reference to a football match they had watched together in İzmir.

=== Early history ===
Football activities in İzmir began in the late 19th century, initially involving Greek, Armenian, British, Italian and other communities. In 1905, Talat Erboy, Şerif Remzi Reyent and Sabri Süleymanoviç, who were students at the American Collegiate Institute, began playing football with foreign students. Nejat Evliyazade was also active in football during this period and later became one of the first Turkish footballers to play in Belgium.

Following the proclamation of the Second Constitutional Era in 1908, football became more widespread among Turkish youth. The sport was also introduced into several schools in İzmir. Şükrü Saraçoğlu, Baha Esat Tekant, Mustafa Necati Bey and Vasıf Çınar were among the educators who supported the development of football in schools.

=== Foundation ===
Towards the end of 1913, Celal Bayar arrived in İzmir and invited Altay members involved in sports to join the Committee of Union and Progress. Bayar provided financial assistance for the club's establishment. The founders included Mustafa Necati, Vasıf Çınar, Şükrü Saraçoğlu, Baha Esat Tekant, Talat Erboy, Nejat Evliyazade, and other sportsmen and educators of the period. Young people at Şark İdadisi played a key role in the club's formation. In his account of the club's early history, Saraçoğlu described the club as "the football branch of the Committee of Union and Progress." The club was established as Hilal İdman Yurdu on 16 January 1914 to promote sporting activities among Turkish youth and to provide a Turkish sporting organization in İzmir, where football clubs representing Greek, Armenian, Italian and other communities were prominent at the time. Several names were proposed for the club after its foundation, including "Ergenekon". The name Altay was eventually considered more suitable, and the club subsequently adopted it. Many of these clubs were later dissolved, became inactive or ceased operating amid the political and demographic changes following the First World War.

The club's colours were initially red and white. They were later changed to black and white following a proposal by Evliyazade. His choice was reportedly influenced by the colours of the team he played for while studying in Belgium. After returning to İzmir, Evliyazade brought black-and-white kits with him, which subsequently became associated with Altay.

The club initially used a room at Şark İdadisi as its headquarters, where its members continued their activities for some time. Later, after coming under the patronage of the Turkish Hearths, the club was allocated a separate room within the organization's premises.

When Altay was founded, several sports facilities in İzmir were used by clubs established by non-Muslim communities. Altay had limited access to suitable training and match venues during its early years. The site of present-day Alsancak Stadium was owned by Panionios.

In early 1915, the Katipoğlu Çayırı or also known as Altay Çayırı, a football ground in what is now the Karabağlar district, was allocated to Altay by İzmir Governor Rahmi Bey. The club developed the ground into a training field, giving Altay its first dedicated sporting ground.

From its foundation until the end of the First World War, Altay played many of its matches at Panionios (Punta) Ground and Altay Çayırı. During the Greek occupation of İzmir, members of the club became dispersed, and those who continued their activities under the name İdman Yurdu played their matches at Panionios Stadium. Following the end of the occupation and the departure and death of a significant part of the city's Greek population, the stadium and other sporting grounds in İzmir became available to Turkish clubs. Panionios Stadium was subsequently used by Turkish clubs, including Altay. In 1923, the stadium was renamed The Society for the Prevention of Tuberculosis (Veremle Mücadele Cemiyeti) Stadium. It later became known as İzmir Alsancak Stadium, after the district in which it was located.

As the club grew, the single room allocated to it in the Turkish Hearths building became insufficient for its needs. In July 1926, the Altay board moved the club to a building in the Yalı area of Karantina, which had a large garden and was located near the sea.

Altay's first recorded match against a Greek club was against Bornova Greek Club, which Altay won 2–0. The club subsequently played against teams representing İzmir's Greek, Armenian, Italian, and other communities. In 1915, the club won a league featuring teams from Karşıyaka Rum, Midilli and Trablusgarp. The club also won the İzmir championship in 1917.

Following the Armistice of Mudros in 1918, Altay faced difficulties amid the political changes in İzmir. Several Altay members became involved in political and social developments. The club's ties to the Committee of Union and Progress and the Turkish Hearths also affected its position during the post-war period. The departure of Mustafa Necati and Vasıf Çınar from İzmir following the Greek occupation, the end of Governor Rahmi Bey's term in 1917, and the suspension of the activities of the Turkish Hearths left the club with fewer sources of support.

Before the Greek occupation of İzmir in 1919, some Altay figures participated in public meetings. Necati Bey and Vasıf Çınar, both founders, joined the Turkish national movement. Çınar helped establish the Redd-i İlhak Society, while Necati Bey participated in the Müdafaa-i Hukuk movement in Balıkesir.

Following the end of the Greek occupation of İzmir on 9 September 1922, sporting activity in the city resumed and several new clubs were established. Existing clubs, including Altay, also resumed their activities. In 1923, the Yıldırım Velespit Club, the first cycling club established in İzmir, was founded by Rauf Bey in the Güzelyalı district. The club later joined Altay and continued its activities under the club's organization.

After the Republic of Turkey was established, several Altay members held positions in politics, public administration, and sports administration. They included Celal Bayar, Şükrü Saraçoğlu, Adnan Menderes, Necati Bey, Vasıf Çınar, Danyal Akbel, and Fahrettin Altay.

In November 1923, Altay became the first sports club from İzmir to travel to Ankara, where it was invited to participate in sporting activities. Following the trip, Mustafa Kemal encouraged Turkish athletes to participate in the 1924 Paris Olympics. Altay was represented at the 1924 Olympics by footballer Hamit Aslan and athlete Said Odyak.

In 1924, several other clubs were established, including Altınordu, which was founded by footballers who had left Altay and later merged with İdmanyurdu. Altınordu's establishment led to increased competition between the two clubs. The two teams met for the first time on 2 February 1924, with the match ending in a goalless draw. Similar disagreements within Altay later contributed to the formation of Göztepe. According to accounts of the club's history, disagreements following a trip to Aydın led to the departure of a group from Altay and the subsequent establishment of Göztepe.

On 14 October 1925, Mustafa Kemal visited Altay during his İzmir visit. While touring the club building, he saw a trophy and reportedly praised the team for winning it. He was also briefed on the club's activities by team captain Hamit Aslan and wrote a message in the club's register praising its young members.

Between 1923 and 1959, Altay won the İzmir Championship 12 times. The 1936–37 championship was won by Üçokspor, an alliance involving Altay, Altınordu and Bucaspor, and is therefore also associated with Altay. During this period, Altay occasionally played against teams from Istanbul. In 1925, Galatasaray visited İzmir and played two matches against local teams. Galatasaray defeated Altay 4–1 in the first match and also defeated the Altay–Altınordu combined team 1–0 in the second match.

In 1926, Altay recorded their first victory against an Istanbul team by defeating Beşiktaş, during the club's tour of İzmir.

As the idea of establishing a national football league in Turkey gained support, the Millî Küme was established in 1937, with four teams from Istanbul and two each from Ankara and İzmir selected to participate. The league was intended to include successful teams from the regional leagues. To strengthen İzmir's representation, several clubs were merged to form new teams. Following discussions involving İzmir Governor Fazlı Güleç, Altay, Altınordu and Bucaspor merged to form Üçok; Göztepe, İzmirspor and Egespor merged to form Doğanspor; and Karşıyaka and Bornova merged to form Yamanspor.

In the 1936–37 season, Üçok and Doğanspor represented İzmir in the Millî Küme and finished in the bottom two places. Üçok recorded two wins, two draws and ten defeats in 14 matches, while Doğanspor recorded four wins, two draws and eight defeats. The following season, Üçok won the 1937–38 İzmir Championship, while Doğanspor won the İzmir Championship in 1938–39.

Altay competed in the Millî Küme in six seasons: 1936–37, 1937–38, 1939–40, 1940–41, 1946–47 and 1949–50, including two seasons under the name Üçok.

In the 1959 Turkish National League, Altay competed in the White Group alongside Fenerbahçe, Beşiktaş, Beykoz, İstanbulspor, Hacettepe, Ankaragücü and İzmirspor. Altay finished third in the group behind Fenerbahçe and Beşiktaş.

Altay finished in the lower positions of the league during the next two seasons. From the 1961–62 season onward, the club generally finished between fourth and ninth place until the 1968–69 season. During this period, Altay finished fourth twice, fifth twice, and sixth and seventh once each. The club achieved its best league finishes with third-place finishes in the 1969–70 and 1976–77 seasons.

Altay remained a mid-table team until its relegation in the 1982–83 season. The club returned to the top division the following season but subsequently finished in the lower positions. The club mainly remained in the lower part of the league between 1984–85 and 1988–89 and was relegated for the second time in 1989–90.

Until 1993, Altay did not have a modern sports facility. During Ender Türk's presidency, the club sought to acquire land in Gaziemir that had been designated for the construction of a sports facility. In 1994, during Mahmut Özgener's presidency, the necessary permits and protocols were completed, and the land was allocated to Altay. The site later became the Gaziemir Vali Kutlu Aktaş Facilities, which also serves as the club's administrative headquarters and continues to be used by the club today. The foundation stone of the facilities was laid on 26 August 1995 by Prime Minister Tansu Çiller. The ceremony was attended by Deputy Prime Minister Hikmet Çetin, Minister of Public Works and Housing Halil Çulhaoğlu, Minister of Industry Hasan Akyol, and Minister of Transport Ali Şevki Erek. Construction of the facilities took longer than initially expected due to financial difficulties. During the construction period, Altay's presidency and board of directors changed five times. Construction was completed on 18 December 1998, and the facilities were opened by Prime Minister Mesut Yılmaz. The facility was named after Kutlu Aktaş, the Governor of İzmir at the time, who had provided support to the club during their construction.

== Honours ==
=== National Championships ===
- Süper Lig
  - Third place (3): 1956–57, 1969–70, 1976–77
- Turkish Football Championship
  - Runners-up (2): 1934, 1951
- TFF First League
  - Winners (1): 2001–02
  - Runners-up (2): 1983–84, 1990–91

=== National Cups ===
- Turkish Cup
  - Winners (2): 1966–67, 1979–80
  - Runners-up (5): 1963–64, 1967–68, 1971–72, 1978–79, 1985–86
- Super Cup
  - Runners-up (2): 1967, 1980
- Prime Minister's Cup
  - Runners-up (3): 1972, 1979, 1986

=== Regional competitions ===
- İzmir Professional League
  - Winners (2): 1956–57, 1957–58
- İzmir Football League
  - Winners (14) (record): 1923–24, 1924–25, 1927–28, 1928–29, 1930–31, 1933–34, 1936–37, 1940–41, 1945–46, 1947–48, 1950–51, 1953–54, 1956–57, 1957–58

^{1}Altay won the championship as "Üçok" (Three arrows), an alliance between Altay, Altınordu, and Bucaspor.

== League participations ==
- Super League: 1958–83, 1984–90, 1991–2000, 2002–03, 2021–2022
- TFF First League: 1983–84, 1990–91, 2000–02, 2003–11, 2018–21, 2022–2024
- TFF Second League: 2011–15, 2017–18, 2024–25
- TFF Third League: 2015–17, 2025–

== European record ==
As of 25 July 1998

| Competition | Pld | W | D | L | GF | GA | GD |
|---|---|---|---|---|---|---|---|
| UEFA Cup Winners' Cup | 6 | 1 | 2 | 3 | 6 | 12 | –6 |
| UEFA Cup | 2 | 1 | 0 | 1 | 5 | 6 | –1 |
| UEFA Intertoto Cup^{1} | 6 | 3 | 1 | 2 | 10 | 9 | +1 |
| UEFA Total | 14 | 5 | 3 | 6 | 21 | 27 | –6 |
| Inter-Cities Fairs Cup | 4 | 0 | 1 | 3 | 3 | 14 | –11 |
| Intertoto Cup^{2} | 6 | 1 | 3 | 2 | 6 | 9 | –3 |
| Balkans Cup | 8 | 1 | 1 | 6 | 6 | 23 | –17 |
| Non-UEFA Total | 18 | 2 | 5 | 11 | 15 | 46 | –31 |
| Overall Total | 32 | 7 | 8 | 17 | 36 | 73 | –37 |

^{1} UEFA edition.

^{2} non-UEFA edition.

UEFA Cup Winners' Cup:

| Season | Round | Club | Home | Away | Aggregate |
|---|---|---|---|---|---|
| 1967–68 | First Round | (Belgium) Standard Liège | 2–3 | 0–0 | 2–3 |
| 1968–69 | First Round | (Norway) Lyn | 3–1 | 1–4 | 4–5 |
| 1980–81 | Preliminary Round | (Portugal) Benfica | 0–0 | 0–4 | 0–4 |

UEFA Cup:

| Season | Round | Club | Home | Away | Aggregate |
|---|---|---|---|---|---|
| 1977–78 | First Round | (East Germany) Carl Zeiss Jena | 4–1 | 1–5 | 5–6 |

UEFA Intertoto Cup:

| Season | Round | Club | Home | Away | Aggregate |
|---|---|---|---|---|---|
| 1974^{1} | Group Stage (Group 10) | (Portugal) CUF | 2–1 | 0–2 | 3rd |
| 1974^{1} | Group Stage (Group 10) | (Sweden) Landskrona | 1–1 | 1–1 | 3rd |
| 1974^{1} | Group Stage (Group 10) | (Sweden) Hammarby | 2–2 | 0–2 | 3rd |
| 1998 | First Round | (Republic of Ireland) Shamrock Rovers | 3–1 | 2–3 | 5–4 |
| 1998 | Second Round | (Hungary) Diósgyőr | 1–1 | 1–0 | 2–1 |
| 1998 | Third Round | (France) Bastia | 3–2 (aet) | 0–2 | 3–4 |

^{1} The tournament was founded in 1961–62, but was only taken over by UEFA in 1995.

Inter-Cities Fairs Cup:

| Season | Round | Club | Home | Away | Aggregate |
|---|---|---|---|---|---|
| 1962–63 | First Round | (Italy) Roma | 2–3 | 1–10 | 3–13 |
| 1969–70 | First Round | (East Germany) Carl Zeiss Jena | 0–0 | 0–1 | 0–1 |

Balkans Cup:

| Season | Round | Club | Home | Away | Aggregate |
|---|---|---|---|---|---|
| 1971 | Group Stage (Group B) | (Greece) Panionios | 2–1 | 0–1 | 3rd |
| 1971 | Group Stage (Group B) | (Romania) Steagul Roșu Brașov | 0–0 | 0–3 | 3rd |
| 1977 | Group Stage (Group A) | (Bulgaria) Slavia Sofia | 0–3 | 0–6 | 3rd |
| 1977 | Group Stage (Group A) | (Romania) Politehnica Timișoara | 2–4 | 2–5 | 3rd |

UEFA Ranking history:

As of 1982

| Season | Rank | Points | Ref. |
|---|---|---|---|
| 1968 | 168 ▲ | 0.500 | |
| 1969 | 103 ▲ | 1.500 | |
| 1970 | 89 ▲ | 2.000 | |
| 1971 | 86 ▲ | 2.000 | |
| 1972 | 87 ▼ | 2.000 | |
| 1973 | 112 ▼ | 1.500 | |
| 1974 | 203 ▼ | 0.500 | |
| 1978 | 157 ▲ | 1.000 | |
| 1979 | 155 ▲ | 1.000 | |
| 1980 | 155 | 1.000 | |
| 1981 | 153 ▲ | 1.000 | |
| 1982 | 149 ▲ | 1.000 | |

== Players ==
=== Current squad ===
As of 11 February 2025

Note: Flags indicate national team as defined under FIFA eligibility rules; some limited exceptions apply. Players may hold more than one non-FIFA nationality.

| No. | Pos. | Nation | Player |
|---|---|---|---|
| 1 | GK | TUR | Ozan Evrim Özenç |
| 3 | DF | TUR | Yusuf Tekin |
| 4 | DF | TUR | Hikmet Çolak |
| 5 | DF | TUR | Sefa Özdemir |
| 6 | MF | TUR | Ceyhun Gülselam |
| 7 | MF | TUR | Caner Baycan |
| 8 | MF | TUR | Murat Demir |
| 9 | FW | TUR | Onur Yıldız |
| 11 | FW | TUR | Murat Uluç (captain) |
| 13 | GK | TUR | Ulaş Hasan Özçelik |
| 16 | GK | TUR | Semih Mendeş |
| 17 | FW | TUR | Emre Tangeldi |
| 18 | DF | TUR | Salih Oktay |

| No. | Pos. | Nation | Player |
|---|---|---|---|
| 20 | DF | TUR | Mert Yıldırım |
| 22 | FW | TUR | Mehmet Kaymaz |
| 25 | MF | TUR | İsa Toygar Ekinci |
| 26 | MF | TUR | Ege Parmaksiz |
| 28 | MF | TUR | Mehmet Gündüz |
| 30 | DF | TUR | Efe Sarıkaya |
| 32 | MF | TUR | Arda Gezer |
| 35 | MF | TUR | Ali Kızılkuyu |
| 44 | DF | TUR | Kuban Altunbudak |
| 63 | FW | TUR | Deniz Kadah |
| 77 | DF | TUR | Onur Efe |
| 88 | DF | TUR | Özgür Özkaya |
| 99 | FW | TUR | Ünal Alihan Kavlak |

=== Out on loan ===
Note: Flags indicate national team as defined under FIFA eligibility rules; some limited exceptions apply. Players may hold more than one non-FIFA nationality.

| No. | Pos. | Nation | Player |
|---|---|---|---|
| — | MF | TUR | Davut Yusuf Özçelik (at Nazillispor until 30 June 2025) |

== See also ==
- List of Turkish sports clubs by foundation dates
- Altay–Göztepe derby
- Altay S.K. (women's football)

== Sources ==
- Football history in Izmir (in Turkish)
