= 2006–07 Beşiktaş J.K. season =

Beşiktaş J.K.
2006–07 season
- President: Yıldırım Demirören
- Head coach: Jean Tigana
- Stadium: BJK İnönü Stadium
- Süper Lig: 2nd
- Turkish Cup: Winners
- UEFA Cup: Group stage
- Turkish Super Cup: Winners
- Top goalscorer: League: Bobô (12); All: Bobô (20)
Home colours	Away colours	Third colours

The 2006–07 season was Beşiktaş' 49th season in the top-flight of the Turkish football league and their 104th year in existence. They finished 2nd place in the Turkish Super League behind Fenerbahçe, earning a berth in the 2007-08 UEFA Champions League. They won their 7th Turkish Cup by defeating Kayseri Erciyesspor 1–0 in extra time. They also defeated Galatasaray 1–0 to win the Turkish Super Cup. They were eliminated in the group stage in the 2006–07 UEFA Cup by finishing 4th.

== Players ==
=== First-team squad ===
Squad at end of season

Note: Flags indicate national team as defined under FIFA eligibility rules; some limited exceptions apply. Players may hold more than one non-FIFA nationality.

No.	Pos.	Nation	Player
1	GK	(Croatia) CRO	Vedran Runje
2	DF	(Turkey) TUR	Serdar Kurtuluş
3	DF	(Turkey) TUR	Mehmet Sedef
4	DF	(Germany) GER	Mustafa Doğan (Note: Doğan was born in Isparta, Turkey, but was raised in Germany and represented Germany at U-21 level before making his international debut for Germany in July 1999.)
5	DF	(Turkey) TUR	Gökhan Zan
7	FW	(Turkey) TUR	Burak Yılmaz
8	DF	(Turkey) TUR	Baki Mercimek (Note: Mercimek was born in Amsterdam, the Netherlands, but also qualified to represent Turkey internationally and represented Turkey at U-21 level before making his international debut for Turkey in 2006.)
9	FW	(Turkey) TUR	Gökhan Güleç
10	MF	(Argentina) ARG	Matías Emilio Delgado
11	FW	(Brazil) BRA	Márcio Nobre
13	FW	(Brazil) BRA	Bobô
15	MF	(Brazil) BRA	Kléberson
17	MF	(Brazil) BRA	Ricardinho

No.	Pos.	Nation	Player
19	DF	(Turkey) TUR	İbrahim Üzülmez
20	MF	(Turkey) TUR	Aydın Karabulut (Note: Karabulut was born in Berlin, Germany, but also qualified to represent Turkey internationally and represented Turkey at U-18, U-19, and U-21 level.)
22	DF	(Turkey) TUR	Ali Tandoğan
29	GK	(Turkey) TUR	Murat Şahin
30	DF	(Turkey) TUR	Ali Güneş (Note: Güneş was born in Donaueschingen, West Germany (now Germany), but also qualified to represent Turkey internationally and represented U-21 and A2 level before making his international debut for Turkey in 2004.)
41	DF	(Turkey) TUR	Koray Avcı
53	MF	(Turkey) TUR	Fahri Tatan
55	MF	(Turkey) TUR	İbrahim Akın
58	DF	(Turkey) TUR	İbrahim Toraman
77	DF	(Turkey) TUR	Emre Özkan
78	DF	(Turkey) TUR	İbrahim Kaş
80	MF	(Turkey) TUR	Kenan Özer (Note: Özer was born in North Nicosia, Northern Cyprus, a self-declared sovereign state that is recognised as still being part of Cyprus by the international community.)

=== Left club during season ===
Note: Flags indicate national team as defined under FIFA eligibility rules; some limited exceptions apply. Players may hold more than one non-FIFA nationality.

No. / Pos. / Nation / Player; 6 / MF / (Turkey) TUR / Serdar Özkan (on loan to Samsunspor)	No. / Pos. / Nation / Player; 21 / GK / (Turkey) TUR / Ramazan Kurşunlu (on loan to Ankaraspor)

== Turkish Super Cup ==
30 July 2006	Galatasaray	0–1	Beşiktaş	Frankfurt, Germany
				Stadium: Commerzbank-Arena

== Süper Lig ==
=== First Half ===
6 August 2006	Vestel Manisaspor	1–0	Beşiktaş	Manisa, Turkey
				Stadium: Manisa 19 Mayıs Stadium

11 August 2006	Beşiktaş	2–1	Gaziantepspor	Istanbul, Turkey
				Stadium: BJK İnönü Stadium

20 August 2006	Denizlispor	0–2	Beşiktaş	İzmir, Turkey
				Stadium: İzmir Atatürk Stadium

25 August 2006	Beşiktaş	3–1	Konyaspor	Istanbul, Turkey
				Stadium: BJK İnönü Stadium

10 September 2006	Beşiktaş	2–3	Trabzonspor	Istanbul, Turkey
				Stadium: BJK İnönü Stadium

17 September 2006	Galatasaray	1–0	Beşiktaş	Istanbul, Turkey
				Stadium: Ali Sami Yen Stadium

24 September 2006	Beşiktaş	2–1	MKE Ankaragücü	Istanbul, Turkey
				Stadium: BJK İnönü Stadium

1 October 2006	Kayseri Erciyesspor	1–1	Beşiktaş	Kayseri, Turkey
				Stadium: Kayseri Atatürk Stadium

15 October 2006	Beşiktaş	1–0	Gençlerbirliği	Istanbul, Turkey
				Stadium: BJK İnönü Stadium

22 October 2006	Çaykur Rizespor	0–1	Beşiktaş	Rize, Turkey
				Stadium: Rize Atatürk Stadium

29 October 2006	Beşiktaş	0–0	Sakaryaspor	Istanbul, Turkey
				Stadium: BJK İnönü Stadium

5 November 2006	Antalyaspor	4–4	Beşiktaş	Antalya, Turkey
				Stadium: Antalya Atatürk Stadium

11 November 2006	Beşiktaş	0–1	Sivasspor	Istanbul, Turkey
				Stadium: BJK İnönü Stadium

19 November 2006	Fenerbahçe	0–0	Beşiktaş	Istanbul, Turkey
				Stadium: Şükrü Saracoğlu Stadium

24 November 2006	Beşiktaş	3–1	Bursaspor	Istanbul, Turkey
				Stadium: BJK İnönü Stadium

2 December 2006	Ankaraspor	0–0	Beşiktaş	Ankara, Turkey
				Stadium: Ankara 19 Mayıs Stadium

9 December 2006	Beşiktaş	2–1	Kayserispor	Istanbul, Turkey
				Stadium: BJK İnönü Stadium

=== Second half ===
28 January 2007	Beşiktaş	3–1	Vestel Manisaspor	Istanbul, Turkey
				Stadium: BJK İnönü Stadium

4 February 2007	Gaziantepspor	0–0	Beşiktaş	Gaziantep, Turkey
				Stadium: Kamil Ocak Stadium

10 February 2007	Beşiktaş	2–0	Denizlispor	Istanbul, Turkey
				Stadium: BJK İnönü Stadium

16 February 2007	Konyaspor	2–1	Beşiktaş	Konya, Turkey
				Stadium: Konya Atatürk Stadium

24 February 2007	Trabzonspor	3–2	Beşiktaş	Trabzon, Turkey
				Stadium: Hüseyin Avni Aker Stadium

3 March 2007	Beşiktaş	2–1	Galatasaray	Istanbul, Turkey
				Stadium: BJK İnönü Stadium

11 March 2007	MKE Ankaragücü	0–1	Beşiktaş	Ankara, Turkey
				Stadium: Ankara 19 Mayıs Stadium

18 March 2007	Beşiktaş	1–0	Kayseri Erciyesspor	Istanbul, Turkey
				Stadium: BJK İnönü Stadium

2 April 2007	Gençlerbirliği	0–2	Beşiktaş	Ankara, Turkey
				Stadium: Ankara 19 Mayıs Stadium

7 April 2007	Beşiktaş	1–0	Çaykur Rizespor	Istanbul, Turkey
				Stadium: BJK İnönü Stadium

14 April 2007	Sakaryaspor	1–1	Beşiktaş	Sakarya, Turkey
				Stadium: Sakarya Atatürk Stadium

21 April 2007	Beşiktaş	1–0	Antalyaspor	Istanbul, Turkey
				Stadium: BJK İnönü Stadium

29 April 2007	Sivasspor	0–1	Beşiktaş	Sivas, Turkey
				Stadium: Sivas 4 Eylül Stadium

5 May 2007	Beşiktaş	0–1	Fenerbahçe	Istanbul, Turkey
				Stadium: BJK İnönü Stadium

13 May 2007	Bursaspor	3–0	Beşiktaş	Bursa, Turkey
				Stadium: Bursa Atatürk Stadium

19 May 2007	Beşiktaş	2–1	Ankaraspor	Istanbul, Turkey
				Stadium: BJK İnönü Stadium

25 May 2007	Kayserispor	3–0	Beşiktaş	Kayseri, Turkey
				Stadium: Kayseri Atatürk Stadium

==== Standings ====
Pos	Team	Pld	W	D	L	GF	GA	GD	Pts	Qualification or relegation
1	Fenerbahçe (C)	34	20	10	4	65	31	+34	70	Qualification to Champions League third qualifying round
2	Beşiktaş	34	18	7	9	43	32	+11	61	Qualification to Champions League second qualifying round
3	Galatasaray	34	15	11	8	58	37	+21	56	Qualification to UEFA Cup second qualifying round
4	Trabzonspor	34	15	7	12	54	44	+10	52	Qualification to Intertoto Cup second round
5	Kayserispor	34	13	12	9	54	43	+11	51	

Rules for classification: 1) points; 2) goal difference; 3) number of goals scored.
(C) Champions

== Turkish Cup ==
After finishing in the top four of the previous season's Süper Lig, Beşiktaş qualified for the group stages. Beşiktaş was placed in Group D, along with MKE Ankaragücü, Bucaspor, Çaykur Rizespor and Gençlerbirliği. Beşiktaş finished second.

=== Group stage ===
Pos	Team	Pld	W	D	L	GF	GA	GD	Pts
1	Gençlerbirliği	4	3	0	1	6	1	+5	9
2	Beşiktaş	4	3	0	1	10	6	+4	9
3	MKE Ankaragücü	4	3	0	1	7	4	+3	9
4	Bucaspor	4	1	0	3	3	10	−7	3
5	Çaykur Rizespor	4	0	0	4	2	7	−5	0

25 October 2006	Bucaspor	1–5	Beşiktaş	İzmir, Turkey
				Stadium: İzmir Atatürk Stadium

17 December 2006	Beşiktaş	3–1	Çaykur Rizespor	Istanbul, Turkey
				Stadium: BJK İnönü Stadium

20 December 2006	Gençlerbirliği	3–0	Beşiktaş	Ankara, Turkey
				Stadium: Ankara 19 Mayıs Stadium

21 January 2007	Beşiktaş	2–1	MKE Ankaragücü	Istanbul, Turkey
				Stadium: BJK İnönü Stadium

=== Quarter-finals ===
31 January 2007	Beşiktaş	4–0	Vestel Manisaspor	Istanbul, Turkey
				Stadium: BJK İnönü Stadium

28 February 2007	Vestel Manisaspor	2–0	Beşiktaş	Manisa, Turkey
				Stadium: Manisa 19 Mayıs Stadium

Beşiktaş won 4-2 on aggregate

=== Semi-finals ===
11 April 2007	Beşiktaş	1–0	Fenerbahçe	Istanbul, Turkey
				Stadium: BJK İnönü Stadium

26 April 2007	Fenerbahçe	1–1 (a.e.t.)	Beşiktaş	Istanbul, Turkey
				Stadium: Şükrü Saracoğlu Stadium

Beşiktaş won 2-1 on aggregate

=== Final ===
9 May 2007	Kayseri Erciyesspor	0–1 (a.e.t.)	Beşiktaş	İzmir, Turkey
				Stadium: İzmir Atatürk Stadium

== UEFA Cup ==
=== First round ===
14 September 2006	Beşiktaş	2–0	(Bulgaria) CSKA Sofia	Istanbul, Turkey
				Stadium: BJK İnönü Stadium

28 September 2006	CSKA Sofia (Bulgaria)	2–2 (a.e.t.)	Beşiktaş	Sofia, Bulgaria
				Stadium: Bulgarian Army Stadium

Beşiktaş won 4-2 on aggregate

=== Group stage ===
Pos	Team	Pld	W	D	L	GF	GA	GD	Pts	Qualification	TOT	DB	LEV	BJK	BRU
1	(England) Tottenham Hotspur	4	4	0	0	9	2	+7	12	Advance to knockout stage	—	3–1	—	—	3–1
2	(Romania) Dinamo București	4	2	1	1	6	6	0	7	Advance to knockout stage	—	—	2–1	2–1	—
3	(Germany) Bayer Leverkusen	4	1	1	2	4	5	−1	4	Advance to knockout stage	0–1	—	—	2–1	—
4	(Turkey) Beşiktaş	4	1	0	3	4	7	−3	3		0–2	—	—	—	2–1
5	(Belgium) Club Brugge	4	0	2	2	4	7	−3	2		—	1–1	1–1	—	—

19 October 2006	Beşiktaş	0–2	(England) Tottenham Hotspur	Istanbul, Turkey
				Stadium: BJK İnönü Stadium

2 November 2006	Dinamo Bucharest (Romania)	2–1	Beşiktaş	Bucharest, Romania
				Stadium: Stadionul Dinamo

29 November 2006	Beşiktaş	2–1	(Belgium) Club Brugge	Istanbul, Turkey
				Stadium: BJK İnönü Stadium

14 December 2006	Bayer Leverkusen (Germany)	2–1	Beşiktaş	Leverkusen, Germany
				Stadium: BayArena
