= 2007–08 Beşiktaş J.K. season =

Beşiktaş
2007–08 season
- Head coach: Ertuğrul Sağlam
- Stadium: BJK İnönü Stadium
- Süper Lig: 3rd
- Turkish Cup: Quarter-finals
- Turkish Super Cup: Runners-up
- UEFA Champions League: Group stage
Home colours	Away colours	Third colours

During the 2007–08 season, Beşiktaş competed in the Süper Lig.

== Season summary ==
Beşiktaş had the unsavoury distinction of setting the record for the heaviest defeat in Champions League history. Away to English giants Liverpool, who Beşiktaş had beat at home just weeks earlier, half-time arrived with the score at 2-0. However, Liverpool scored 6 more times in the second half to win 8-0, a scoreline that has yet to be bettered over one leg in the Champions League since.

== Players ==
=== First-team squad ===
Squad at end of season

Note: Flags indicate national team as defined under FIFA eligibility rules; some limited exceptions apply. Players may hold more than one non-FIFA nationality.

No.	Pos.	Nation	Player
1	GK	(Turkey) TUR	Rüştü Reçber
2	DF	(Turkey) TUR	Serdar Kurtuluş
3	DF	(Turkey) TUR	Mehmet Sedef
5	DF	(Turkey) TUR	Gökhan Zan
6	MF	(Turkey) TUR	Mehmet Yozgatlı (Note: Yozgatlı was born in Melle, West Germany (now Germany), but also qualified to represent Turkey internationally and represented Turkey at U-19, U-21, and B level.)
8	DF	(Turkey) TUR	Baki Mercimek (Note: Mercimek was born in Amsterdam, the Netherlands, but also qualified to represent Turkey internationally and represented Turkey at U-21 level before making his international debut for Turkey in 2006.)
10	MF	(Argentina) ARG	Matías Emilio Delgado
11	FW	(Brazil) BRA	Márcio Nobre
13	FW	(Brazil) BRA	Bobô
14	MF	(Chile) CHI	Rodrigo Tello
17	MF	(Brazil) BRA	Ricardinho
18	MF	(France) FRA	Édouard Cissé
19	DF	(Turkey) TUR	İbrahim Üzülmez
20	MF	(Turkey) TUR	Aydın Karabulut (Note: Karabulut was born in Berlin, Germany, but also qualified to represent Turkey internationally and represented Turkey at U-18, U-19, and U-21 level.)
21	MF	(Turkey) TUR	Serdar Özkan

No.	Pos.	Nation	Player
22	DF	(Turkey) TUR	Ali Tandoğan
23	FW	(Slovakia) SVK	Filip Hološko
24	DF	(Croatia) CRO	Gordon Schildenfeld
33	DF	(Turkey) TUR	Koray Şanlı
35	GK	(Turkey) TUR	Atilla Özmen
39	FW	(Turkey) TUR	Emir Gökçe
58	DF	(Turkey) TUR	İbrahim Toraman
61	DF	(Turkey) TUR	Ethem Yılmaz
78	DF	(Turkey) TUR	İbrahim Kaş
84	GK	(Turkey) TUR	Hakan Arıkan
87	GK	(Turkey) TUR	Korcan Çelikay
90	DF	(Turkey) TUR	Bülent Uzun
91	FW	(Turkey) TUR	Ali Kuçik
99	FW	(Turkey) TUR	Batuhan Karadeniz

=== Left club during season ===
Note: Flags indicate national team as defined under FIFA eligibility rules; some limited exceptions apply. Players may hold more than one non-FIFA nationality.

No.	Pos.	Nation	Player
4	DF	(Germany) GER	Mustafa Doğan (Note: Doğan was born in Isparta, Turkey, but was raised in Germany and represented Germany at U-21 level before making his international debut for Germany in July 1999.) (retired)
7	FW	(Turkey) TUR	Burak Yılmaz (to Manisaspor)
9	FW	(Turkey) TUR	Gökhan Güleç (to Denizlispor)
9	FW	(Argentina) ARG	Federico Higuaín (on loan to América)
15	DF	(Senegal) SEN	Lamine Diatta (released)

No.	Pos.	Nation	Player
26	FW	(Turkey) TUR	Can Erdem (on loan to Kocaelispor)
29	GK	(Turkey) TUR	Murat Şahin (to Gaziantepspor)
41	MF	(Turkey) TUR	Koray Avcı (to Manisaspor)
53	MF	(Turkey) TUR	Fahri Tatan (on loan to Çaykur Rizespor)
55	MF	(Turkey) TUR	İbrahim Akın (to İstanbul BB)

== Turkish Super Cup ==
August 5, 2007	Fenerbahçe	2–1	Beşiktaş	Cologne, Germany
				Stadium: RheinEnergieStadion

== Süper Lig ==
=== First Half ===
August 11, 2007	Beşiktaş	1–0	Konyaspor	Istanbul, Turkey
				Stadium: BJK İnönü Stadium

August 19, 2007	Kasımpaşa	1–2	Beşiktaş	Istanbul, Turkey
				Stadium: Atatürk Olympic Stadium

August 25, 2007	Gaziantepspor	0–1	Beşiktaş	Gaziantep, Turkey
				Stadium: Kamil Ocak Stadium

September 1, 2007	Beşiktaş	0–0	Kayserispor	Istanbul, Turkey
				Stadium: BJK İnönü Stadium

September 15, 2007	Ankaraspor	0–0	Beşiktaş	Ankara, Turkey
				Stadium: Yenikent AŞAŞ Stadium

September 22, 2007	Beşiktaş	3–2	Denizlispor	Istanbul, Turkey
				Stadium: BJK İnönü Stadium

September 29, 2007	Galatasaray	2–1	Beşiktaş	Istanbul, Turkey
				Stadium: Ali Sami Yen Stadium

October 7, 2007	Beşiktaş	1–0	Gençlerbirliği	Istanbul, Turkey
				Stadium: BJK İnönü Stadium

October 20, 2007	Trabzonspor	2–3	Beşiktaş	Trabzon, Turkey
				Stadium: Hüseyin Avni Aker Stadium

October 28, 2007	Beşiktaş	0–0	İstanbul BB	Istanbul, Turkey
				Stadium: BJK İnönü Stadium

November 3, 2007	Fenerbahçe	2–1	Beşiktaş	Istanbul, Turkey
				Stadium: Şükrü Saracoğlu Stadium

November 10, 2007	Beşiktaş	1–2	Sivasspor	Istanbul, Turkey
				Stadium: BJK İnönü Stadium

November 24, 2007	Gençlerbirliği OFTAŞ	0–1	Beşiktaş	Ankara, Turkey
				Stadium: Ankara 19 Mayıs Stadium

December 2, 2007	Beşiktaş	1–1	Çaykur Rizespor	Istanbul, Turkey
				Stadium: BJK İnönü Stadium

December 7, 2007	Bursaspor	0–1	Beşiktaş	Bursa, Turkey
				Stadium: Bursa Atatürk Stadium

December 16, 2007	Beşiktaş	3–1	MKE Ankaragücü	Istanbul, Turkey
				Stadium: BJK İnönü Stadium

December 21, 2007	Vestel Manisaspor	1–2	Beşiktaş	Manisa, Turkey
				Stadium: Manisa 19 Mayıs Stadium

=== Second half ===
January 12, 2008	Konyaspor	1–2	Beşiktaş	Konya, Turkey
				Stadium: Konya Atatürk Stadium

January 19, 2008	Beşiktaş	4–2	Kasımpaşa	Istanbul, Turkey
				Stadium: BJK İnönü Stadium

January 26, 2008	Beşiktaş	3–1	Gaziantepspor	Istanbul, Turkey
				Stadium: BJK İnönü Stadium

February 9, 2008	Kayserispor	2–0	Beşiktaş	Kayseri, Turkey
				Stadium: Kayseri Atatürk Stadium

February 16, 2008	Beşiktaş	3–2	Ankaraspor	Istanbul, Turkey
				Stadium: BJK İnönü Stadium

February 22, 2008	Denizlispor	1–2	Beşiktaş	Denizli, Turkey
				Stadium: Denizli Atatürk Stadium

March 2, 2008	Beşiktaş	1–0	Galatasaray	Istanbul, Turkey
				Stadium: BJK İnönü Stadium

March 7, 2008	Gençlerbirliği	1–2	Beşiktaş	Ankara, Turkey
				Stadium: Ankara 19 Mayıs Stadium

March 16, 2008	Beşiktaş	3–0	Trabzonspor	Istanbul, Turkey
				Stadium: BJK İnönü Stadium

March 22, 2008	İstanbul BB	2–1	Beşiktaş	Istanbul, Turkey
				Stadium: Atatürk Olympic Stadium

March 29, 2008	Beşiktaş	1–2	Fenerbahçe	Istanbul, Turkey
				Stadium: BJK İnönü Stadium

April 6, 2008	Sivasspor	1–2	Beşiktaş	Sivas, Turkey
				Stadium: Sivas 4 Eylül Stadium

April 11, 2008	Beşiktaş	0–1	Gençlerbirliği OFTAŞ	Istanbul, Turkey
				Stadium: BJK İnönü Stadium

April 20, 2008	Çaykur Rizespor	1–2	Beşiktaş	Rize, Turkey
				Stadium: Rize Atatürk Stadium

April 26, 2008	Beşiktaş	3–0	Bursaspor	Adana, Turkey
				Stadium: Adana 5 Ocak Stadium

May 4, 2008	MKE Ankaragücü	0–2	Beşiktaş	Ankara, Turkey
				Stadium: Ankara 19 Mayıs Stadium

May 10, 2008	Beşiktaş	5–1	Vestel Manisaspor	Istanbul, Turkey
				Stadium: BJK İnönü Stadium

=== Standings ===
Pos	Team	Pld	W	D	L	GF	GA	GD	Pts	Qualification or relegation
1	Galatasaray (C)	34	24	7	3	64	23	+41	79	Qualification to Champions League third qualifying round
2	Fenerbahçe	34	22	7	5	72	37	+35	73 (Note: Fenerbahçe were ahead of Beşiktaş and Sivasspor on head-to-head points and Beşiktaş were ahead of Sivasspor on head-to-head goal difference: Fenerbahçe: 12 pts; Beşiktaş: 3 pts, 5–7 (–2); Sivasspor: 3 pts, 4–8 (–4).)	Qualification to Champions League second qualifying round
3	Beşiktaş	34	23	4	7	58	32	+26	73	Qualification to UEFA Cup second qualifying round
4	Sivasspor	34	23	4	7	57	29	+28	73	Qualification to Intertoto Cup second round
5	Kayserispor	34	15	10	9	50	31	+19	55	Qualification to UEFA Cup first round (Note: Kayserispor have won the 2007–08 Turkish Cup competition and thus are qualified for the first round of the UEFA Cup.)

Rules for classification: 1) points; 2) goal difference; 3) number of goals scored.
(C) Champions

== Turkish Cup ==
After finishing in the top four of the previous season's Süper Lig, Beşiktaş qualified for the group stages. Beşiktaş was placed in Group A, along with Ankaraspor, MKE Ankaragücü, Çaykur Rizespor and Diyarbakır Diskispor. Beşiktaş finished second.

=== Group stage ===
Pos	Team	Pld	W	D	L	GF	GA	GD	Pts
1	Çaykur Rizespor	4	3	1	0	5	2	+3	10
2	Beşiktaş J.K.	4	2	1	1	9	4	+5	7
3	Ankaraspor	4	2	1	1	6	5	+1	7
4	Ankaragücü	4	1	1	2	4	5	−1	4
5	Diskispor	4	0	0	4	4	12	−8	0

October 31, 2007	Beşiktaş	1–2	Çaykur Rizespor	Istanbul, Turkey
				Stadium: BJK İnönü Stadium

January 5, 2008	Diyarbakır Diskispor	0–4	Beşiktaş	Diyarbakır, Turkey
				Stadium: Diyarbakır Atatürk Stadium

January 8, 2008	Beşiktaş	3–1	Ankaraspor	Istanbul, Turkey
				Stadium: BJK İnönü Stadium

January 16, 2008	MKE Ankaragücü	1–1	Beşiktaş	Ankara, Turkey
				Stadium: Ankara 19 Mayıs Stadium

=== Quarter-finals ===
February 2, 2008	Çaykur Rizespor	1–0	Beşiktaş	Rize, Turkey
				Stadium: Rize Atatürk Stadium

February 27, 2008	Beşiktaş	3–2	Çaykur Rizespor	Istanbul, Turkey
				Stadium: BJK İnönü Stadium

3-3 on aggregate. Çaykur Rizespor won on away goals.

== Champions League ==
=== Second qualifying round ===
1 August 2007	Beşiktaş (Turkey)	1–0	(Moldova) Sheriff Tiraspol	BJK İnönü Stadium, Istanbul
20:00	İbrahim Toraman 73'	Report		Referee: Peter Sippel (Germany)

8 August 2007	Sheriff Tiraspol (Moldova)	0–3	(Turkey) Beşiktaş	Sheriff Stadium, Tiraspol
19:00		Report	Bobô 58', 69'; Koray 90'	Referee: Iain Brines (Scotland)

Beşiktaş won 4–0 on aggregate.

=== Third qualifying round ===
15 August 2007	Zürich (Switzerland)	1–1	(Turkey) Beşiktaş	Hardturm, Zürich
20:15	Alphonse 90+7'	Report	Delgado 3'	Referee: Mike Riley (England)

29 August 2007	Beşiktaş (Turkey)	2–0	(Switzerland) Zürich	BJK İnönü Stadium, Istanbul
19:15	Delgado 56', 64'	Report		Referee: Peter Fröjdfeldt (Sweden)

Beşiktaş won 3–1 on aggregate.

=== Group stage ===
Pos	Team	Pld	W	D	L	GF	GA	GD	Pts	Qualification	POR	LIV	MAR	BES
1	(Portugal) Porto	6	3	2	1	8	7	+1	11	Advance to knockout stage	—	1–1	2–1	2–0
2	(England) Liverpool	6	3	1	2	18	5	+13	10	Advance to knockout stage	4–1	—	0–1	8–0
3	(France) Marseille	6	2	1	3	6	9	−3	7	Transfer to UEFA Cup	1–1	0–4	—	2–0
4	(Turkey) Beşiktaş	6	2	0	4	4	15	−11	6		0–1	2–1	2–1	—

Source: RSSSF

18 September 2007	Marseille (France)	2–0	(Turkey) Beşiktaş	Stade Vélodrome, Marseille
20:45	Rodriguez 76'; Cissé 90+1'	Report MatchCentre		Attendance: 35,676; Referee: Matteo Trefoloni (Italy)

3 October 2007	Beşiktaş (Turkey)	0–1	(Portugal) Porto	BJK İnönü Stadium, Istanbul
20:45		Report MatchCentre	Quaresma 90+2'	Attendance: 19,795; Referee: Pieter Vink (Netherlands)

24 October 2007	Beşiktaş (Turkey)	2–1	(England) Liverpool	BJK İnönü Stadium, Istanbul
20:45	Hyypiä 13' (o.g.); Bobô 82'	Report MatchCentre	Gerrard 85'	Attendance: 25,837; Referee: Claus Bo Larsen (Denmark)

6 November 2007	Liverpool (England)	8–0	(Turkey) Beşiktaş	Anfield, Liverpool
20:45	Crouch 19', 89'; Benayoun 32', 53', 56'; Gerrard 69'; Babel 79', 81'	Report MatchCentre		Attendance: 41,143; Referee: Markus Merk (Germany)

28 November 2007	Beşiktaş (Turkey)	2–1	(France) Marseille	BJK İnönü Stadium, Istanbul
20:45	Tello 27'; Bobô 88'	Report MatchCentre	Taiwo 65'	Attendance: 19,448; Referee: Luis Medina Cantalejo (Spain)

11 December 2007	Porto (Portugal)	2–0	(Turkey) Beşiktaş	Estádio do Dragão, Porto
20:45	L. González 44'; Quaresma 62'	Report MatchCentre		Attendance: 39,608; Referee: Peter Fröjdfeldt (Sweden)
