= 2007 Turkish Cup final =

- Event: 2006–07 Turkish Cup
Beşiktaş J.K.	Kayseri Erciyesspor
1	0
- After extra time.
- Date: 9 May 2007
- Venue: İzmir Atatürk Stadium, İzmir
- Man of the Match: Bobo (Beşiktaş J.K.)
- Referee: İsmet Arzuman (Turkey)
- Weather: Fine

The 2007 Turkish Cup final was a football match between Beşiktaş J.K. and Kayseri Erciyesspor. The match was played at the İzmir Atatürk Stadium for the 2nd time in a row. Beşiktaş won 1–0 after extra time.

== Beşiktaş J.K. ==
As the defending Turkish Cup champions, Beşiktaş finished 2nd place in Group D, to proceed to the Quarter-finals. Beşiktaş beat Vestel Manisaspor 4-0 at home, and lost 0–2 away. In the Semi-finals Beşiktaş faced off, with one of their Istanbul rivals, Fenerbahçe S.K. At home, Beşiktaş won 1–0. Away Beşiktaş ended the match down 1–0. In extra time though, Mert Nobre scored a goal for Beşiktaş making it 1–1. Beşiktaş continued on to the final.

== Kayseri Erciyesspor ==
Kayseri Erciyesspor finished 2nd place in Group A. In the Quarter-finals they faced Galatasaray. The 1st match ended 0–0 at home, and away 1-1. Kayseri Erciyes won by away goals. In the Semi-finals, Kayseri Erciyes faced Trabzonspor. The results were a 1–0 win away and a 1–1 draw at home. Kayseri Erciyes managed to 5–4 in the penalties, and proceed to the final.

== Final ==
The game ended 0–0 after 90 minutes. During extra time Bobo scored the only goal of the game. Beşiktaş won their 7th Turkish Cup, and their second in a row.

== Match details ==
9 May 2007
20:00

Kayseri Erciyesspor	0 - 1	Beşiktaş
	Report	101' Bobô

İzmir Atatürk Stadyumu, İzmir
Referee: İsmet Arzuman

KAYSERİ ERCİYESSPOR:
54	(Turkey) Orkun Uşak
4	(Turkey) Kürşat Duymuş
5	(Turkey) Emre Toraman	(yellow card) 17'	(substituted off) 108'
11	(Bulgaria) Zdravko Lazarov
15	(Turkey) Mustafa Sarp
18	(Guinea) Daouda Jabi	(yellow card) 25'
21	(Turkey) Cenk İşler		(substituted off) 24'
26	(Turkey) Mehmet Eren Boyraz
38	(Turkey) Ali Turan	(yellow card) 100'
63	(Turkey) Ergün Teber	(yellow card) 34'
66	(Turkey) İlhan Özbay		(substituted off) 104'
Substitutes:
64	(Turkey) Yusuf Soysal
6	(Ivory Coast) Serge Dié
9	(Montenegro) Radomir Đalović		(substituted on) 24'
10	(Turkey) Timuçin Bayazit		(substituted on) 108'
19	(Turkey) Gökhan Kök
30	(Turkey) Özgür Bayer
39	(Turkey) İlkem Özkaynak		(substituted on) 104'
Manager:
(Turkey) Bülent Korkmaz

BEŞİKTAŞ:
1	(Croatia) Vedran Runje
8	(Turkey) Baki Mercimek
22	(Turkey) Ali Tandoğan		(substituted off) 61'
41	(Turkey) Koray Avcı		(substituted off) 51'
5	(Turkey) Gökhan Zan
19	(Turkey) İbrahim Üzülmez (C)	(yellow card) 25'
2	(Turkey) Serdar Kurtuluş
17	(Brazil) Ricardinho
7	(Turkey) Burak Yılmaz
11	(Brazil) Mert Nobre		(substituted off) 91'
13	(Brazil) Bobô
Substitutes:
29	(Turkey) Murat Şahin
53	(Turkey) Fahri Tatan
3	(Turkey) Mehmet Seyfettin Sedef		(substituted on) 51'
9	(Turkey) Gökhan Güleç
55	(Turkey) İbrahim Akın	(yellow card) 117'	(substituted on) 91'
78	(Turkey) İbrahim Kaş	(yellow card) 112'	(substituted on) 61'
14	(Turkey) Can Erdem
Manager:
(France) Jean Tigana

Man of the match:
Bobô (Beşiktaş)
Referee:
(Turkey) İsmet Arzuman
Assistant referees:
(Turkey) Bahattin Duran
(Turkey) Serkan Akarca
Fourth referee:
(Turkey) Mustafa Kamil Abitoğlu
