= 2006–07 Galatasaray S.K. season =

Galatasaray
2006–07 season
- President: Özhan Canaydın
- Head coach: Eric Gerets
- Stadium: Ali Sami Yen Stadı
- Süper Lig: 3rd
- Turkish Cup: Quarter-finals
- UEFA Champions League: Group stage
- Turkish Super Cup: Runners-up
- Top goalscorer: League: Ümit Karan (18); All: Ümit Karan (22)
- Highest home attendance: 71,230 vs Bordeaux (CL, 12 September 2006)
Home colours	Away colours	Third colours

The 2006–07 season was Galatasaray's 103rd in existence and the 49th consecutive season in the Süper Lig. This article shows statistics of the club's players in the season, and also lists all matches that the club have played in the season.

== Squad statistics ==
No.	Pos.	Name	Süper Lig		Turkish Cup		CL		Total	
No.	Pos.	Name	Apps	Goals	Apps	Goals	Apps	Goals	Apps	Goals
1	GK	(Colombia) Faryd Mondragón	30	0	3	0	8	0	41	0
17	GK	(Turkey) Fevzi Elmas	0	0	2	0	0	0	2	0
12	GK	(Turkey) Aykut Erçetin	4	0	2	0	0	0	6	0
28	DF	(Turkey) Tolga Seyhan	4	0	4	0	2	0	10	0
55	DF	(Turkey) Sabri Sarıoğlu	30	2	6	1	8	1	44	4
5	DF	(Turkey) Orhan Ak	21	0	2	0	5	0	28	0
2	DF	(Croatia) Stjepan Tomas	32	0	4	1	7	0	43	1
21	DF	(Turkey) Emre Aşık	12	1	1	0	1	0	14	1
4	DF	(Cameroon) Rigobert Song	25	1	2	0	7	0	34	1
19	DF	(Turkey) Cihan Haspolatlı	20	1	5	0	8	0	33	1
-	DF	(Turkey) Uğur Akdemir	0	0	1	0	0	0	1	0
33	DF	(Turkey) Uğur Uçar	0	0	0	0	1	0	1	0
25	DF	(Turkey) Ferhat Öztorun	9	0	2	0	1	0	12	0
26	MF	(Turkey) Aydın Yılmaz	3	0	1	0	1	0	5	0
-	DF	(Turkey) Oğuz Sabankay	1	0	1	0	0	0	2	0
24	MF	(Turkey) Mehmet Güven	9	1	2	0	1	0	12	1
7	MF	(Turkey) Okan Buruk	15	1	4	0	3	1	22	2
67	MF	(Turkey) Ergün Penbe	8	0	2	0	3	0	13	0
18	MF	(Turkey) Ayhan Akman	31	1	4	0	6	0	41	1
11	MF	(Turkey) Hasan Şaş	20	2	3	0	6	1	29	3
14	MF	(Turkey) Mehmet Topal	11	0	2	0	4	0	17	0
16	MF	(Argentina) Marcelo Carrusca	12	0	3	0	2	0	17	0
23	MF	(Japan) Junichi Inamoto	25	0	4	0	5	1	34	1
66	MF	(Turkey) Arda Turan	26	5	3	1	7	2	36	8
22	MF	(Serbia) Saša Ilić	29	10	4	0	8	3	41	13
58	FW	(Turkey) Hasan Kabze	22	3	6	1	1	0	29	4
27	FW	(Turkey) Özgürcan Özcan	2	0	1	0	1	0	4	0
10	FW	(Turkey) Necati Ateş	20	6	5	1	4	1	29	8
9	FW	(Turkey) Hakan Şükür (C)	26	4	0	0	6	1	32	5
99	FW	(Turkey) Ümit Karan	28	18	5	2	6	2	39	22

== Süper Lig ==
=== Standings ===
Pos	Team	Pld	W	D	L	GF	GA	GD	Pts	Qualification or relegation
1	Fenerbahçe (C)	34	20	10	4	65	31	+34	70	Qualification to Champions League third qualifying round
2	Beşiktaş	34	18	7	9	43	32	+11	61	Qualification to Champions League second qualifying round
3	Galatasaray	34	15	11	8	58	37	+21	56	Qualification to UEFA Cup second qualifying round
4	Trabzonspor	34	15	7	12	54	44	+10	52	Qualification to Intertoto Cup second round
5	Kayserispor	34	13	12	9	54	43	+11	51	

Rules for classification: 1) points; 2) goal difference; 3) number of goals scored.
(C) Champions

== Türkiye Kupası ==
=== Group stage ===
Pos	Team	Pld	W	D	L	GF	GA	GD	Pts
1	Galatasaray	4	3	0	1	6	6	0	9
2	Kayseri Erciyesspor	4	2	1	1	10	7	+3	7
3	Kayserispor	4	2	1	1	5	2	+3	7
4	Bursaspor	4	1	1	2	5	7	−2	4
5	Karşıyaka	4	0	1	3	3	7	−4	1

25 October 2006 1	Galatasaray	2–1	Bursaspor	Istanbul
20:00 EET	Ateş 51'; Karan 76'	(Report)	Šumulikoski 5'	Stadium: Ali Sami Yen Stadı; Referee: Barış Şimşek

8 November 2006 2	Karşıyaka	1–2	Galatasaray	İzmir
20:00 EET	Aydoğdu 81'	(Report)	Karan 62'; Kabze 74'	Stadium: Atatürk Stadı; Referee: Cem Deda

16 December 2006 3	Galatasaray	1–0	Kayserispor	Istanbul
19:00 EET	Tomas 60'	(Report)		Stadium: Ali Sami Yen Stadı; Referee: Fırat Aydınus

20 December 2006 4	Kayseri Erciyesspor	4–1	Galatasaray	Kayseri
20:00 EET	Đalović 5p', 58'; Toraman 18'; İşler 52'	(Report)	Sarıoğlu 8'	Stadium: Atatürk Stadı; Referee: Tolga Özkalfa

=== Quarter-final ===
1 February 2007 1	Kayseri Erciyesspor	0–0	Galatasaray	Kayseri
20:00 EET		(Report)		Stadium: Atatürk Stadı; Referee: Bülent Demirlek

27 February 2007 2	Galatasaray	1–1	Kayseri Erciyesspor	Istanbul
20:00 EET	Turan 92'	(Report)	Lazarov 97' (pen.)	Stadium: Ali Sami Yen Stadı; Referee: Aytekin Durmaz

== UEFA Champions League ==
=== Third qualifying round ===
9 August 2006 1	Galatasaray	5–2	Mladá Boleslav	Istanbul
21:30 EET	Ilić 7' (pen.); Turan 43', 60'; Şükür 49'; Sabri Sarıoğlu 90'	(Report)	Brezinský 82'; Kulič 83'	Stadium: Ali Sami Yen Stadı; Referee: (Austria) Konrad Plautz

23 August 2006 2	Mladá Boleslav	1–1	Galatasaray	Mladá Boleslav
21:30 EET	Palát 8'	(Report)	Şaş 73'	Stadium: Městský stadion Referee: (Sweden) Martin Hansso

=== Group stage ===
Pos	Team	Pld	W	D	L	GF	GA	GD	Pts	Qualification	LIV	PSV	BOR	GAL
1	(England) Liverpool	6	4	1	1	11	5	+6	13	Advance to knockout stage	—	2–0	3–0	3–2
2	(Netherlands) PSV Eindhoven	6	3	1	2	6	6	0	10	Advance to knockout stage	0–0	—	1–3	2–0
3	(France) Bordeaux	6	2	1	3	6	7	−1	7	Transfer to UEFA Cup	0–1	0–1	—	3–1
4	(Turkey) Galatasaray	6	1	1	4	7	12	−5	4		3–2	1–2	0–0	—

Source: RSSSF

12 September 2006 1	Galatasaray	0–0	Bordeaux	Istanbul
21:45 EET		(Report)		Stadium: Atatürk Olimpiyat Stadı; Attendance: 71,230; Referee: (Italy) Roberto Rosetti

27 September 2006 2	Liverpool	3–2	Galatasaray	Liverpool
21:45 EET	Crouch 9', 52'; García 14'	(Report)	Karan 59', 65'	Stadium: Anfield; Referee: (Spain) Luis Medina Cantalejo

18 October 2006 3	Galatasaray	1–2	PSV	Istanbul
21:45 EET	Saša Ilić 19'	(Report)	Kromkamp 59'; Koné 72'	Stadium: Atatürk Olympic Stadium; Attendance: 51,714; Referee: (Russia) Yuri Baskakov

31 October 2006 4	PSV	2–0	Galatasaray	Eindhoven
21:45 EET	Simons 59'; Koné 84'	(Report)		Stadium: Philips Stadion; Referee: (Sweden) Martin Hansson

22 November 2006 5	Bordeaux	3–1	Galatasaray	Bordeaux
21:45 EET	Alonso 22'; Laslandes 47'; Faubert 50'	(Report)	Inamoto 73'	Stadium: Stade Chaban Delmas; Referee: (Slovakia) Vladimír Hriňák

5 December 2006 6	Galatasaray	3–2	Liverpool	Istanbul
21:45 EET	Ateş 24'; Buruk 28'; Ilić 79'	(Report)	Fowler 22', 90'	Stadium: Atatürk Olympic Stadium; Attendance: 21,481; Referee: (Portugal) Olegário Benquerença

== Süper Kupa ==
30 July 2006	Galatasaray	0–1	Beşiktaş	Frankfurt
20:45 EET		(Report)	Nobre 59'	Stadium: Commerzbank-Arena; Attendance: 25,500; Referee: Bülent Demirlek

== Friendlies ==
8 July 2006	Germinal Beerschot	1–0	Galatasaray
17:05	Sterchele 31'	(Report)

10 July 2006	Lierse	2–0	Galatasaray
21:00	Mrđa 2' (pen.)	(Report)	Akman 37'

14 July 2006	FC Brussels	1–4	Galatasaray
21:30	Sylla 71'	(Report)	Ilić 20'; Şükür 46'; Ateş 58'; Özcan 79'

23 July 2006	Bursaspor	3–2	Galatasaray
20:00	Šumulikoski 6'; Frăsineanu 19'; Şen 60'	(Report)	Sarıoğlu 5'; Şükür 22'

28 July 2006	Borussia Mönchengladbach	1–1	Galatasaray	Mönchengladbach
21:00	Neuville 82'	(Report)	Özcan 24'	Stadium: Stadion im Borussia-Park

9 January 2007 Efes Pilsen Kupası	Galatasaray	1–2	Feyenoord
20:00	Ateş 42'	(Report)	Van Hooijdonk 14'; Vincken 58'

10 January 2007 Efes Pilsen Kupası	Beşiktaş	1–1	Galatasaray
20:30	Nobre 90'	(Report)	Karan 9'

17 January 2007	Galatasaray	0–1	Hertha BSC
20:00		(Report)	Baştürk 60'

20 January 2007	Galatasaray	2–1	Denizlispor
20:00	Karan 18'; Kabze 65'	(Report)	Adriano 61'

== Attendance ==
Competition	Av. Att.	Total Att.
Süper Lig	-	-
Turkish Cup	-	-
Champions League	48,142	144,425
Total	-	-
