= 2006 Turkish Cup final =

- Event: 2005–06 Turkish Cup
Fenerbahçe S.K.	Beşiktaş J.K.
2	3
- Date: 3 May 2006
- Venue: İzmir Atatürk Stadium, İzmir
- Man of the Match: Tümer Metin (Beşiktaş J.K.)
- Referee: Bülent Demirlek (Turkey)
- Weather: Fine

The 2006 Turkish Cup final was a football match played on 3 May 2006 at the İzmir Atatürk Stadium in İzmir. It was the final and deciding match of the 2005–06 Türkiye Kupası (Turkish Cup).

== Rouute to the final ==
Fenerbahçe				Beşiktaş				
Round 1 Position: Group B: Pos / Team / Pld / W / D / L / GF / GA / GD / Pts / GAZ / FEN / KEC / MKE / TİY; 1 / Gaziantepspor / 4 / 3 / 1 / 0 / 6 / 1 / +5 / 10 / / / 2–0 / / 1–0; 2 / Fenerbahçe SK / 4 / 2 / 1 / 1 / 7 / 4 / +3 / 7 / 0–2 / / / / 4–0; 3 / Kayseri Erciyesspor / 4 / 1 / 2 / 1 / 3 / 4 / −1 / 5 / / 0–0 / / 2–1; 4 / MKE Ankaragücü / 4 / 1 / 1 / 2 / 8 / 9 / −1 / 4 / 1–1 / 2–3; 5 / Tarsus İdman Yurdu / 4 / 0 / 1 / 3 / 4 / 10 / −6 / 1 / / / 1–1 / 3–4; Source: tff.org.tr				Round 1 Position: Group D: Pos / Team / Pld / W / D / L / GF / GA / GD / Pts / SAM / BJK / KON / İNG / SAR; 1 / Samsunspor / 4 / 3 / 0 / 1 / 10 / 9 / +1 / 9 / / / 5–3 / 2–1; 2 / Beşiktaş J.K. / 4 / 2 / 1 / 1 / 7 / 2 / +5 / 7 / 3–0 / / / / 3–0; 3 / Konyaspor / 4 / 2 / 1 / 1 / 8 / 7 / +1 / 7 / / 1–1 / / 2–0; 4 / İnegölspor / 4 / 1 / 1 / 2 / 3 / 5 / −2 / 4 / / 1–0 / / / 1–1; 5 / Sarıyer G.K. / 4 / 0 / 1 / 3 / 4 / 9 / −5 / 1 / 2–3 / / 1–2; Source: tff.org.tr				
Opponent	Agg.	1st leg	2nd leg	Play-offs	Opponent	Agg.	1st leg	2nd leg
Galatasaray	4-4 (a)	2–1	2–3	Quarter-Finals	Kayserispor	2-1	1-0	2-0
Denizlispor	7-0	4-0	3-0	Semi-Finals	Gaziantepspor	5-1	3-1	2-0

== Match details ==
3 May 2006
19:00 CEST

Fenerbahçe	2 - 3 (a.e.t.)	Beşiktaş
Alex 54'; Yozgatli 80'	Report	31, 115' Metin; 35' Güleç

İzmir Atatürk Stadyumu, İzmir
Attendance: 51,295
Referee: Bülent Demirlek

FENERBAHÇE:
1	(Turkey) Volkan Demirel
2	(Brazil) Fabio Luciano	(yellow card) 101'
4	(Ghana) Stephen Appiah
5	(Turkey) Ümit Özat (C)
10	(Turkey) Tuncay		(substituted off) 46'
15	(Turkey) Mehmet Aurelio	(yellow card) 110' (yellow-red card) 110'
19	(Turkey) Önder Turacı
20	(Brazil) Alex		(substituted off) 100'
21	(Turkey) Selçuk Şahin		(substituted off) 46'
24	(Turkey) Deniz Barış
66	(France) Nicolas Anelka
Substitutes:
22	(Turkey) Serdar Kulbilge
6	(Turkey) Mahmut Hanefi Erdoğdu
7	(Turkey) Mehmet Yozgatlı		(substituted on) 46'
8	(Turkey) Zafer Biryol
17	(Turkey) Can Arat
23	(Turkey) Semih Şentürk		(substituted on) 46'
30	(Turkey) Serkan Balcı	(yellow card) 117'	(substituted on) 100'
Manager:
(Germany) Christoph Daum

BEŞİKTAŞ:
35	(Colombia) Óscar Córdoba
58	(Turkey) İbrahim Toraman		(substituted off) 85'
5	(Turkey) Gökhan Zan
87	(Turkey) Mehmet Sedef		(substituted off) 78'
15	(Brazil) José Kléberson
7	(Turkey) Okan Buruk	(yellow card) 39'	(substituted off) 72'
11	(Turkey) Tümer Metin	(yellow card) 115'
41	(Turkey) Koray Avcı
19	(Turkey) İbrahim Üzülmez (C)	(yellow card) 70'
24	(Turkey) Gökhan Güleç
13	(Brazil) Bobô
Substitutes:
29	(Turkey) Murat Şahin
22	(Turkey) Ali Tandoğan	(yellow card) 99'	(substituted on) 78'
4	(Turkey) Mustafa Doğan
30	(Turkey) Ali Güneş		(substituted on) 72'
10	(Turkey) Sergen Yalçın	(yellow card) 119'	(substituted on) 85'
28	(Czech Republic) Tomáš Jun
55	(Turkey) İbrahim Akın
Manager:
(France) Jean Tigana

2005–2006 Turkish Cup champion

Sixth title

Man of the match:
Tümer Metin (Beşiktaş)
Referee:
(Turkey) Bülent Demirlek
Assistant Referees:
(Turkey) Erhan Sönmez
(Turkey) Alper Ulusoy
(Turkey) Çetin Sarıgül
