= 2006 Turkish Super Cup =

| Galatasaray | Beşiktaş |
| 0 | 1 |
- Date: 30 July 2006
- Venue: Commerzbank-Arena, Frankfurt
- Man of the Match: Mert Nobre (Beşiktaş)
- Referee: Bülent Demirlek (Turkey)
- Attendance: 25,500

The 2006 Turkish Super Cup (Turkish: TFF Süper Kupa 2006) was a football match between 2005–06 Süper Lig champions Galatasaray, and the 2005–06 Turkish Cup winners Beşiktaş. The match was played in Commerzbank-Arena in Frankfurt, Germany. It was the 34th edition of the Turkish Super Cup, since its establishment as Presidential Cup, and was the first time under the rebranded TFF Süper Kupa name. Also this final marked the re-establishment of the national super cup matches in Turkey, sanctioned by Turkish Football Federation. The last edition was in 1998, and there was an 8-year hiatus.

== Background ==
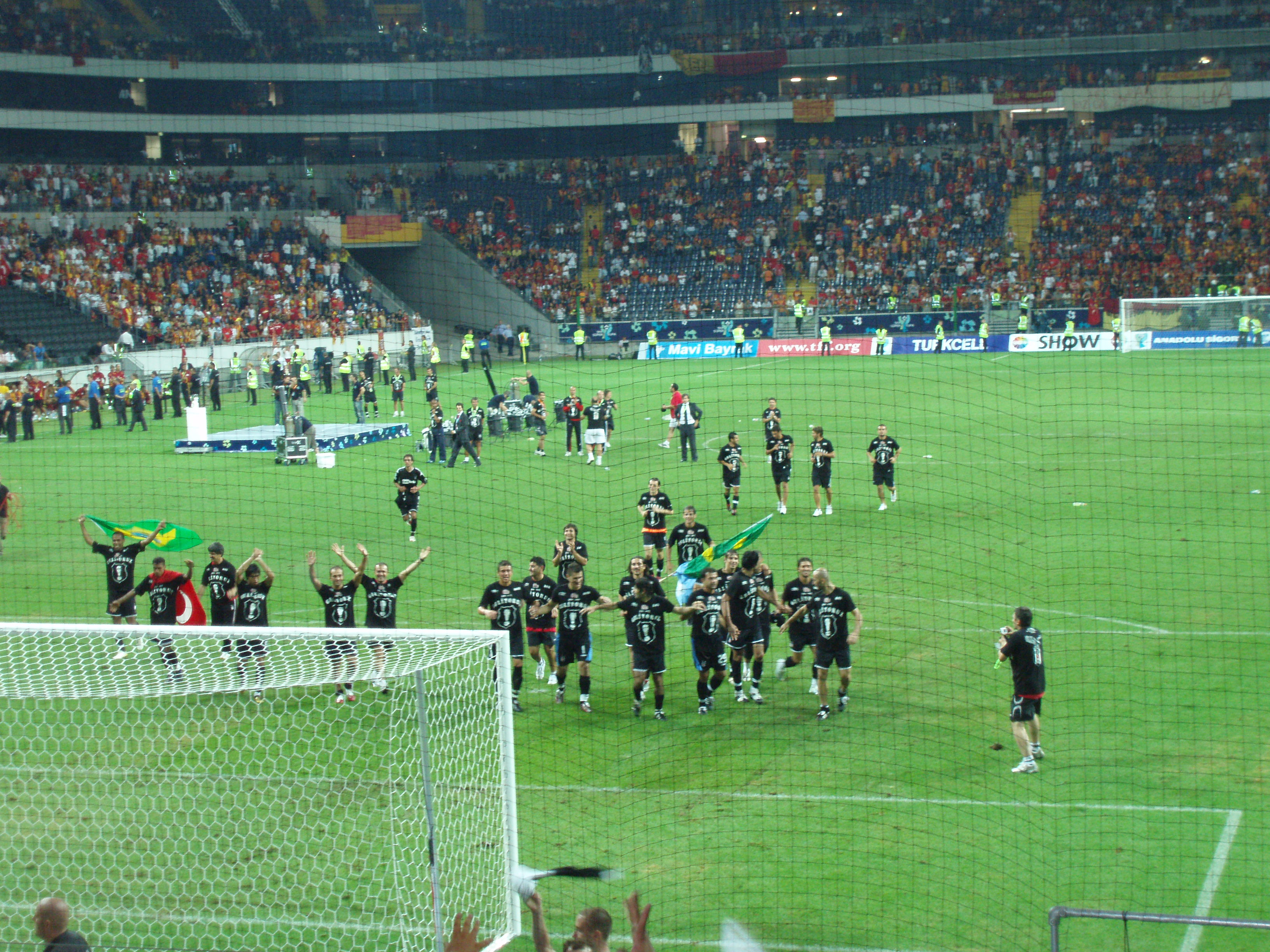
Beşiktaş players celebrating their win with supporters in Commerzbank-Arena.

Galatasaray won their 16th Süper Lig championship with 26 wins, 5 draws and 3 losses, just ahead of rivals Fenerbahçe. Galatasaray were the winning club in both of the regular season league matches against Beşiktaş. They beat Beşiktaş 3–2 at home, and 2–1 away. Collecting a total of 83 points, they were the Turkish champions and qualified for the Turkish Super Cup final.

Second finalists and eventual winners of the Turkish Super Cup, Beşiktaş finished third in the Süper Lig. But they succeeded to win their 6th Turkish Cup title throughout the season and gain a berth in the Turkish Super Cup final. Through previous season's league position, they entered the tournament in the group stage. With 2 wins, 1 draw and 1 loss, Beşiktaş finished the group stage in 2nd place, just behind Samsunspor. In the quarter-finals, Beşiktaş beat Kayserispor 2–1 on aggregate score. In the semi-finals, they beat Gaziantepspor 5–1 on aggregate. Beşiktaş played the 2006 Turkish Cup Final in İzmir Atatürk Stadium against Fenerbahçe. Beşiktaş were winners of the cup by 3–2 score after extra time.

== Match details ==
2006 Turkish Super Cup
30 July 2006
19:45 EST (UTC+02)
Final

| Galatasaray | 0–1 | Beşiktaş |
|---|---|---|
| | Report (in Turkish) | Nobre 59' |

Commerzbank-Arena, Frankfurt
Referee: Bülent Demirlek (Turkey)

Galatasaray
| GK | 1 | (Colombia) Faryd Mondragón |
| DF | 4 | (Cameroon) Rigobert Song | (yellow card) 55' |
| DF | 28 | (Turkey) Tolga Seyhan | (yellow card) 85' |
| DF | 55 | (Turkey) Sabri Sarıoğlu | | (substituted off) 77' |
| DF | 67 | (Turkey) Ergün Penbe |
| MF | 11 | (Turkey) Hasan Şaş | (yellow card) 48' |
| MF | 19 | (Turkey) Cihan Haspolatli |
| MF | 22 | (Serbia) Saša Ilić | | (substituted off) 72' |
| MF | 24 | (Turkey) Mehmet Güven |
| FW | 9 | (Turkey) Hakan Şükür (c) |
| FW | 10 | (Turkey) Necati Ateş | | (substituted off) 72' |
Substitutes:
| GK | 17 | (Turkey) Fevzi Elmas |
| DF | 2 | (Croatia) Stjepan Tomas |
| MF | 18 | (Turkey) Ayhan Akman | | (substituted on) 72' |
| DF | 25 | (Turkey) Ferhat Öztorun |
| MF | 26 | (Turkey) Aydın Yılmaz | | (substituted on) 77' |
| FW | 27 | (Turkey) Özgürcan Özcan | | (substituted on) 72' |
| MF | 66 | (Turkey) Arda Turan |
Manager:
(Belgium) Eric Gerets
Man of the match:
(Turkey) Mert Nobre (Beşiktaş)

Beşiktaş
| GK | 1 | (Croatia) Vedran Runje |
| DF | 58 | (Turkey) İbrahim Toraman |
| DF | 5 | (Turkey) Gökhan Zan |
| DF | 8 | (Turkey) Baki Mercimek |
| DF | 19 | (Turkey) İbrahim Üzülmez (c) |
| MF | 41 | (Turkey) Koray Avcı |
| MF | 15 | (Brazil) José Kléberson |
| MF | 53 | (Turkey) Fahri Tatan | | (substituted off) 70' |
| MF | 10 | (Argentina) Matias Delgado | (yellow card) 89' |
| FW | 11 | (Turkey) Mert Nobre |
| FW | 9 | (Turkey) Gökhan Güleç | (yellow card) 68' | (substituted off) 70' |
Substitutes:
| GK | 29 | (Turkey) Murat Şahin |
| DF | 22 | (Turkey) Ali Tandoğan |
| FW | 13 | (Brazil) Bobô | | (substituted on) 70' |
| MF | 3 | (Turkey) Mehmet Sedef |
| MF | 2 | (Turkey) Serdar Kurtuluş | | (substituted on) 70' |
| DF | 4 | (Turkey) Mustafa Doğan |
| MF | 55 | (Turkey) İbrahim Akın |
Manager:
(France) Jean Tigana
