= Ramazan Kurşunlu =

Turkish footballer and manager

Personal information
- Date of birth: 7 July 1981 (age 45)
- Place of birth: İzmir, Turkey
- Height: 1.90 m (6 ft 3 in)
- Position: Goalkeeper

Senior career*
Years	Team	Apps	(Gls)
2000–2003	Altay	40	(0)
2003–2007	Beşiktaş J.K.	20	(0)
2005–2006	→ Diyarbakirspor (loan)	9	(0)
2006–2007	→ Ankaraspor (loan)	5	(0)
2007–2009	Ankaraspor	6	(0)
2009–2010	Karşıyaka	20	(0)
2010–2012	Çaykur Rizespor	54	(0)
2012–2013	Adana Demirspor	8	(0)
2013	Altay	0	(0)
Total		162	(0)

International career
2002–2003	Turkey U-21	5	(0)

Managerial career
- 2018–2019: Bandırmaspor
- 2019: Menemenspor
- 2019–2020: Balıkesirspor
- * Club domestic league appearances and goals

Ramazan Kurşunlu (Albanian: Ramazan Kurshumliu; born 7 July 1981) is a Turkish former professional footballer who played as a goalkeeper. He most recently served as manager of Balıkesirspor.

== Coaching career ==
Kurşunlu started his coaching career with Manisa Büyükşehir Belediyespor as a goalkeeper coach. In April 2016, he was also invited to coach the goalkeeper of the Turkish U16 national team for two games. In the following two year, he worked for Çaykur Rizespor (2017) and Alanyaspor (2018) as goalkeeper coach, before he on 6 December 2018 was appointed as manager of Bandırmaspor.

On 20 June 2019, Kurşunlu was appointed as the new manager of Menemen Belediyespor.
