= Murat Şahin =

Turkish footballer

Personal information
- Date of birth: 4 February 1976 (age 50)
- Place of birth: Istanbul, Turkey
- Height: 1.84 m (6 ft 0 in)
- Position: Goalkeeper

Team information
- Current team: Pendikspor (manager)

Youth career
- Göztepe Hilalspor

Senior career*
Years	Team	Apps	(Gls)
1995–2001	Fenerbahçe		
2000	→ Konyaspor (loan)		
2000–2001	→ Diyarbakırspor (loan)		
2001–2003	Adanaspor		
2004	Çaykur Rizespor	14	(0)
2004–2008	Beşiktaş	13	(0)
2008–2010	Gaziantepspor	16	(0)
2010–2011	Kasımpaşa	36	(0)
2011–2012	Eyüpspor	14	(0)

Managerial career
- 2011–2012: Racing-Union (youth coach)
- 2012–2013: Eyüpspor
- 2013–2014: Gaziantepspor (goalkeeping coach)
- 2014–2015: Sivasspor (goalkeeping coach)
- 2016: Gaziantepspor (assistant)
- 2017: Kayserispor (assistant)
- 2017: Eskişehirspor (assistant)
- 2018: Konyaspor (assistant)
- 2018–2019: Alanyaspor (assistant)
- 2019–2020: Y. Malatyaspor (assistant)
- 2020–2021: Beşiktaş (assistant)
- 2024: Antalyaspor (assistant)
- 2025: Hatayspor
- 2026–: Pendikspor
Medal record
Representing Turkey
Men's football
FIFA World Cup
Third place	2002 Korea/Japan
- * Club domestic league appearances and goals

Murat Şahin (born 4 February 1976) is a Turkish football coach and former player who played as a goalkeeper who is the manager of TFF 1. Lig club Pendikspor.

== Career ==
Şahin began his career in Göztepe Hilalspor where he was watched by scouts. At the age of 17, he had been transferred to Fenerbahçe and turned professional when he was 18 years old. He spent 7 seasons in Sarı Kanaryalar until he was transferred to Konyaspor in the 1998/99 mid-season transfer window.

After periods in several clubs in the Turkish League, he moved back to Istanbul by way of a transfer to Beşiktaş in the 2004/05 pre-season transfer market as an experienced keeper.

=== Uche Incident ===
During his time in Fenerbahçe, he was the 2nd keeper behind Rüştü. In the 1999/2000 season, he had a decent chance to play against Beşiktaş after Rüştü cut his hand just before the match. Thus, he had his place in the Istanbul derby, but regrettably, an unfortunate moment happened whereby Şahin broke his team-mate Uche's leg when trying to gather the ball in the box.

=== One legged keeper ===
He had his most notable performance on the 29th match day of the Turkish League on 22 April 2007 against Antalyaspor, when first choice goalkeeper Vedran Runje was suspended. Şahin played well and didn't concede, despite picking up a serious injury on his knee ligaments in the second half. The final score was 1–0 for Beşiktaş as the team gained 3 crucial points to ensure Champions League participation for the following season.

Şahin was transferred to southern Turkey club Gaziantepspor during the transfer window of the Turkish League 2007/08 season.

== Honours ==
=== Club ===
Beşiktaş

- Turkish Cup: 2005–06, 2006–07
- Turkish Super Cup: 2006

=== International ===
Turkey

  - FIFA Confederations Cup 2003: Third place
