= Gökhan Kök =

Turkish footballer

Personal information
- Full name: Gökhan Kök
- Date of birth: January 3, 1981 (age 45)
- Place of birth: Bulanık, Turkey
- Height: 1.78 m (5 ft 10 in)
- Position: Defender

Senior career*
Years	Team	Apps	(Gls)
- İnegölspor
2001–2004	Göztepe		
2004–2005	Sakaryaspor	31	(0)
2005–2007	Kayseri Erciyesspor	52	(1)
2007–2008	Çaykur Rizespor	28	(1)
2008–2009	Sakaryaspor		
2009–2010	Diyarbakırspor		
2010–2012	Sakaryaspor		
2012–2013	Hatayspor		
- * Club domestic league appearances and goals

Gökhan Kök (born 3 January 1981, in Bulanık) is a Turkish retired football defender.
