= İbrahim Üzülmez =

Turkish footballer and manager (born 1974)

Personal information
- Date of birth: 10 March 1974 (age 52)
- Place of birth: İzmit, Turkey
- Height: 1.75 m (5 ft 9 in)
- Position: Left-back

Youth career
- 1990–1993: Kocaelispor

Senior career*
Years	Team	Apps	(Gls)
1993–1994	Gönenspor	26	(3)
1994–1995	Kardemir Karabükspor	24	(1)
1995–1996	İskenderun Demir Çelikspor	19	(5)
1996–1997	Kardemir Karabükspor	4	(0)
1997–1998	Yeni Amasyaspor	32	(2)
1998–1999	Kardemir Karabükspor	18	(0)
1999–2000	Gaziantepspor	47	(2)
2000–2011	Beşiktaş	304	(11)
Total		474	(24)

International career
2003–2009	Turkey	37	(1)

Managerial career
- 2015: Çaykur Rizespor (assistant)
- 2015: Elazığspor
- 2016: Gençlerbirliği
- 2016–2017: Gaziantepspor
- 2017–2018: Çaykur Rizespor
- 2019: Gençlerbirliği
- 2019–2020: Bursaspor
- 2020: Ankaragücü
- 2022–2023: Eyüpspor
- 2024: Pendikspor
- 2025–2026: Iğdır
- * Club domestic league appearances and goals

İbrahim Üzülmez (born 10 March 1974) is a Turkish football manager and former international player.

== Playing career ==
Üzülmez was born to a family of farmers in İzmit, Turkey. He would often sneak out of doing his farmer duties to go play football with friends. It was always his dream to play for Beşiktaş J.K. one day, as he listened to all their matches on the radio.

At the age of 16, he was spotted playing football with his friends in Gönen, some people passing by were so impressed by his skill that they took it upon themselves to call in scouts to watch his play. Gönenspor immediately signed him and he played there for one year. He was then transferred to slightly bigger club Karabükspor. Üzülmez then did his national military duties and on his return, he signed for Turkish Premier League team Gaziantepspor. Gaziantepspor was his first major professional team he played for, he stayed there for 1.5 years. When the transfer season opened, his dreams were made reality when Beşiktaş came knocking on his door. He really shined in the 2002–03 season and was selected for the Turkey national team. With player Sergen Yalçın's departure from the club and Tümer Metin's shock signing with rivals Fenerbahçe; in 2006, Beşiktaş named its new captain, Üzülmez. His performance against Barcelona in 2000–01 UEFA Champions League group stage still remembered, He helped his team for a famous 3–0 win.

He had a serious accident in June 2008, returning home from his Antalya holidays with his family, he hit another car in the western Turkish city of Manisa and then collided with a tree, but came out safe

In the second half of the season 2010–11, during the half time break of a league game against MKE Ankaragücü, a fiery quarrel emerged with his teammate İbrahim Toraman in the dressing room. The details of the fight have not been confirmed, but the press commonly announced that Üzülmez lashed out a few punches on Toraman's head and Toraman remained unresponsive until other team members intervened and calmed the two down.

Following the game, Üzülmez's contract was immediately terminated by unanimous board decision, while Toraman was strictly banished from publicly speaking about the occurrence. One day later, club chairman Yıldırım Demirören arranged a press release alongside İbrahim Üzülmez and remarked that Üzülmez was one of the important figures in Beşiktaş history, and that his memory would always be cherished by the community. The chairman further added that Üzülmez's all receivables should be paid in a single sum immediately.

It is still a strong opinion that the occurrence has preceding roots going back to another fight between the duo, at Beşiktaş's 2008 pre-season camp in Austria, which is generally known as the "slipper fight". Being the captain of the team, Üzülmez had asked Toraman about why he came to lunch with slippers, while all other players were wearing their sports equipments. Being the secondary captain of the team, Toraman did not take that lightly and they clenched fists.

During his playing career, Üzülmez was often referred to by his given nicknames "Deli İbrahim" or "Deli İbo" (lit. 'İbo the Mad').

On 5 July 2011, it was announced that Üzülmez retired from professional football.

== Managerial career ==
In October 2019, Üzülmez took over as coach of TFF First League side Çaykur Rizespor having agreed a contract until the end of the season.

== Career statistics ==
=== International ===
Appearances and goals by national team and year
National team	Year	Apps	Goals
Turkey	2003	14	0
Turkey	2004	7	0
Turkey	2005	0	0
Turkey	2006	2	0
Turkey	2007	9	0
Turkey	2008	0	0
Turkey	2009	4	1
Total		36	1

Score and result list Turkey's goal tally first, score column indicates score after Üzülmez' goal.

International goal scored by İbrahim Üzülmez
No.	Date	Venue	Opponent	Score	Result	Competition
1	2 June 2009	Kadir Has Stadium, Kayseri, Turkey	Azerbaijan	2–0	2–0	Friendly

=== Managerial ===
As of 10 February 2016

Team	From	To	Record				
Team	From	To	G	W	D	L	Win %
Elazığspor	2015	2015	7	3	2	2	42.86
Gençlerbirliği	2015	-----	27	13	7	7	48.15
Total			34	16	9	9	47.06

== Honours ==
Beşiktaş

- Süper Lig: 2002–03, 2008–09
- Turkish Cup: 2005–06, 2006–07, 2008–09
- Atatürk Cup: 2000
- Turkish Super Cup: 2006

Turkey

- FIFA Confederations Cup third place: 2003

Individual

- Beşiktaş J.K. Squads of Century (Bronze Team)
