= Mehmet Sedef =

Turkish professional footballer (born 1987)

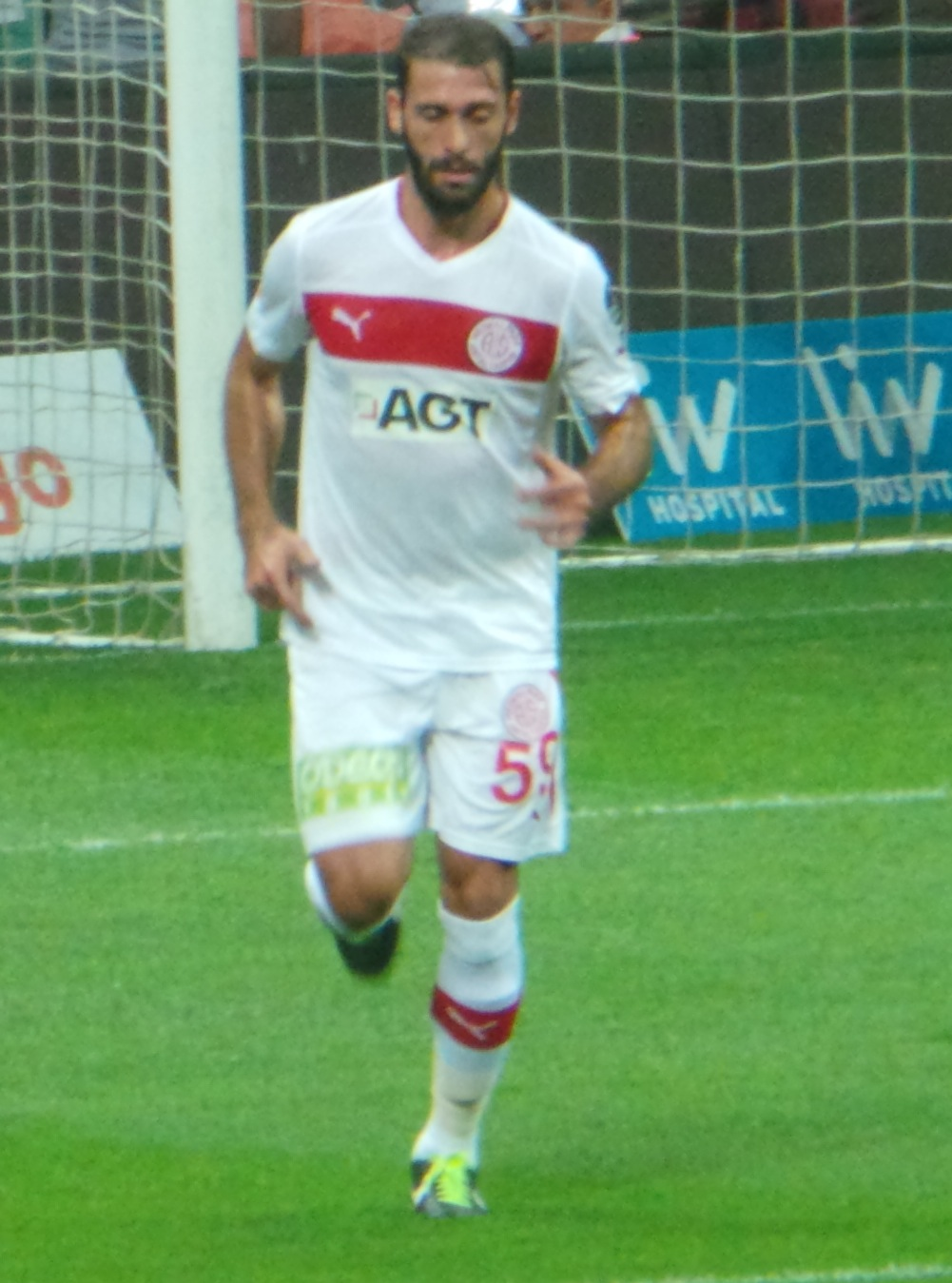

Personal information
- Full name: Mehmet Seyfettin Sedef
- Date of birth: 5 August 1987 (age 39)
- Place of birth: Kilis, Turkey
- Height: 1.80 m (5 ft 11 in)
- Positions: Centre back; left back

Team information
- Current team: Çorum FK

Youth career
- 2000–2005: Beşiktaş

Senior career*
Years	Team	Apps	(Gls)
2005–2008	Beşiktaş	24	(0)
2008–2009	Altay S.K.	6	(0)
2009–2010	Rizespor	13	(0)
2010–2011	Konyaspor	16	(1)
2011–2013	Gençlerbirliği	43	(0)
2013–2015	Antalyaspor	38	(0)
2015	Gaziantepspor	5	(0)
2016	Adanaspor	13	(0)
2016–2018	Ümraniyespor	49	(0)
2018–2019	Afjet Afyonspor	11	(0)
2019	Ümraniyespor	4	(0)
2020	Adanaspor	9	(0)
2020–2021	Çorum FK	16	(0)

International career
2005–2006	Turkey U-19	8	(1)
2005	Turkey U-20	1	(0)
- * Club domestic league appearances and goals as of 20:35, 20 February 2022 (UTC)

Mehmet Seyfettin Sedef (born 5 August 1987 in Kilis) is a Turkish professional footballer who last played as a defender for Çorum FK.

== Club career ==
After passing through their youth ranks, he joined the Beşiktaş senior squad in 2005, making his Süper Lig debut on 28 May 2005 against Akçaabat Sebatspor in the last match of 2004-2005 season. He was loaned to Altay S.K. to the end of 2008-2009 season and Çaykur Rizespor for the 2009–10 season.

Following the away match against Konyaspor played on October 10, 2013, without any prior disturbances or indications, he reported a heart condition as the team was boarding the plane back home. The prompt examinations revealed that he had been suffering a heart attack and was taken into intensive care for the necessary operation and follow-up. He played full 90 minutes in that aforementioned match.

On 31 October 2015, his contract with Gaziantepspor was terminated by mutual agreement.

== Honours ==
=== Club ===
Beşiktaş

- Turkish Cup: 2005–06, 2006–07
- Turkish Super Cup: 2006
