= Baki Mercimek =

Turkish footballer (born 1982)

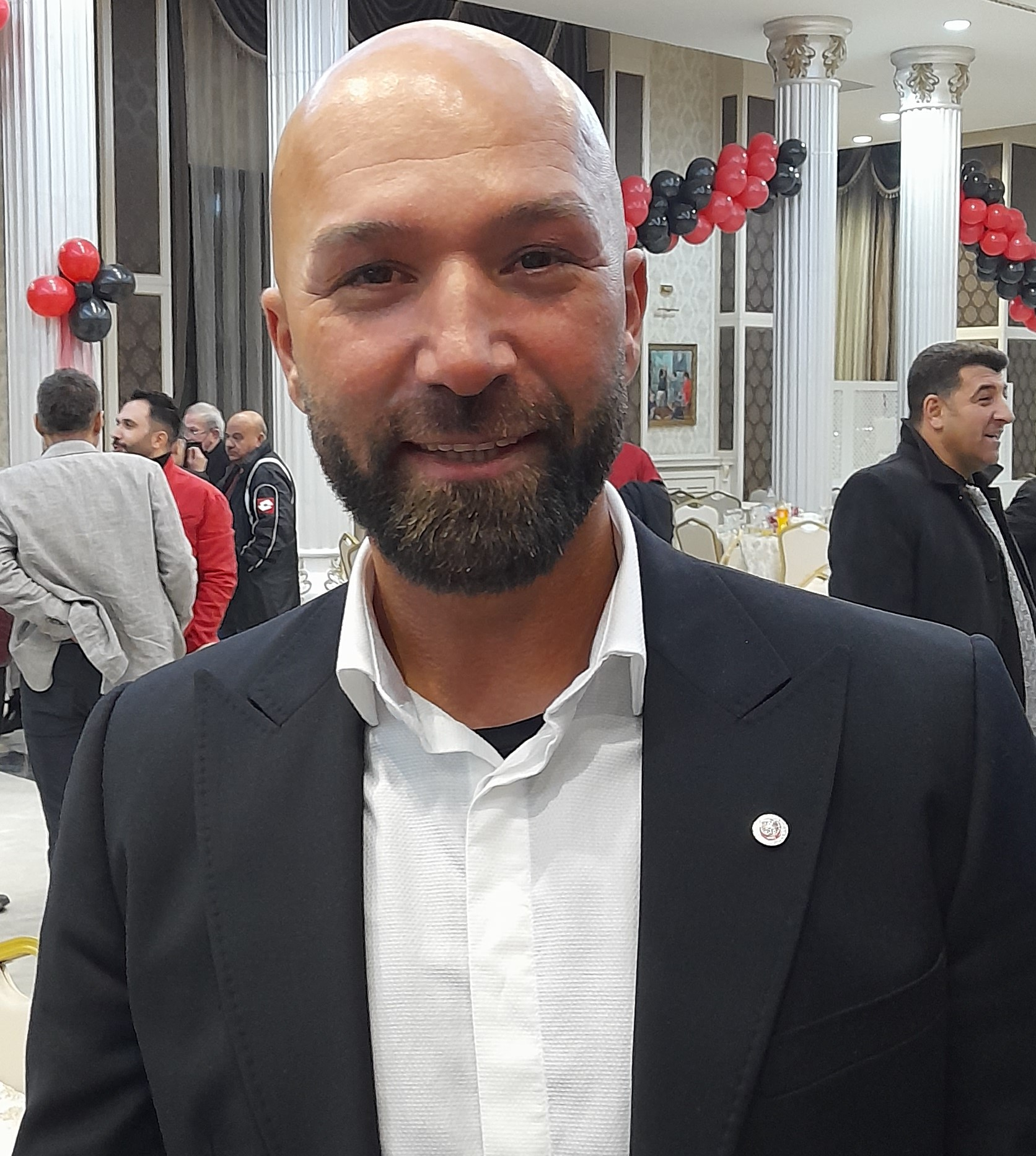

Personal information
- Full name: Baki Mercimeki
- Date of birth: 17 September 1982 (age 44)
- Place of birth: Amsterdam, Netherlands
- Height: 1.64 m (5 ft 4 1/2 in)
- Positions: Centre back; defensive midfielder

Senior career*
Years	Team	Apps	(Gls)
1999–2001	HFC Haarlem	36	(5)
2001–2002	Sunderland	0	(0)
2002–2003	Stormvogels Telstar	24	(1)
2003–2006	Gençlerbirliği	58	(4)
2006–2008	Beşiktaş	39	(0)
2008–2010	Ankaraspor	12	(0)
2009–2010	→ Ankaragücü (loan)	5	(1)
2010	Diyarbakirspor	5	(0)
2010–2011	Karşıyaka	9	(0)
2011–2013	Bugsaşspor	26	(0)
2013–2014	Gaziosmanpaşaspor	24	(1)
2014–2015	Bugsaşspor	23	(0)

International career^{‡}
2003	Turkey U-21	3	(0)
2006	Turkey	1	(0)
- * Club domestic league appearances and goals ‡ National team caps and goals as of 6 September 2015

Baki Mercimek (born 17 September 1982 in Amsterdam) is a former footballer. Born in the Netherlands, he represented Turkey at international level.

== Career ==
He previously had spells with Sunderland AFC in England, for whom he never played a first team game, as well as Haarlem in the Netherlands, and Beşiktaş in Turkey.

=== Background ===
Mercimek was born in Amsterdam. He was eligible to play for the Netherlands as well as Turkey.

== Honours ==
=== Club ===
Beşiktaş

- Turkish Cup: 2006–07
- Turkish Super Cup: 2006
