= 2005–06 Turkish Cup =

Türkiye Kupası

Tournament details
- Country: Turkey
- Teams: 72

Final positions
- Champions: Beşiktaş (6th title)
- Runners-up: Fenerbahçe

Tournament statistics
- Top goal scorer(s): Gökhan Ünal (7 goals)

The 2005–06 Turkish Cup was the 44th edition of the annual tournament that determined the association football Super League (Süper Lig) Turkish Cup (Turkish: Türkiye Kupası) champion under the auspices of the Turkish Football Federation (Turkish: Türkiye Futbol Federasyonu; TFF). Beşiktaş J.K. beat Fenerbahçe SK 3–2 in the final at İzmir. This tournament adopted the UEFA Cup system, replacing the former standard knockout competition scheme. The results of the tournament also determined which clubs would be promoted or relegated.

== First qualification round ==
Team 1	Score	Team 2
Güngören Belediyespor	2–4	Istanbulspor AS
Sarıyer G.K.	2–2 (8–7 p)	Eyüpspor
Boluspor	1–2	Kocaelispor
Fatih Karagümrük	2–2 (6–5 p)	Kasımpaşa S.K.
Çanakkale Dardanelspor	0–1	Altay SK
Uşakspor	1–1 (4–3 p)	Karşıyaka SK
Giresunspor	1–1 (5–4 p)	Sivasspor
Vestel Manisaspor	0–1	Turgutluspor
Pazarspor	2–0	Orduspor
Adanaspor	(w/o)	K. Erciyesspor
Tarsus İ.Y.	4–1 (aet)	Antalyaspor
İnegölspor	1–0	Bursaspor
Elazığspor	2–1	Mardinspor
Adıyamanspor	1–1 (2–3 p)	Siirtspor
Yimpaş Yozgatspor	0–2	Türk Telekomspor
Gençlerbirliği ASAS	1–2	MKE Kırıkkalespor
İskenderun Demir Çelikspor	0–1	Gaziantep BŞB

Source: Official page of 2005–06 Fortis Turkish Cup.

== Second qualification round ==
Team 1	Score	Team 2
Diyarbakırspor	2–1 (aet)	Kocaelispor
Konyaspor	3–1	Siirtspor
Samsunspor	1–0	İstanbul BŞB
Fatih Karagümrük	1–1 (7–6 p)	Akçaabat Sebatspor
Turgutluspor	0–2	Gaziantepspor
Giresunspor	2–2 (3–1 p)	Sakaryaspor
Uşakspor	1–4	MKE Ankaragücü
K. Erciyesspor	4–2	Gençlerbirliği
Istanbulspor AS	0–0 (5–6 p)	Tarsus İY
Mersin İY	4–1	Pazarspor
İnegölspor	2–0	Elazığspor
Altay SK	6–2	Ankaraspor
Çaykur Rizespor	0–3	Sarıyer G.K.
Malatyaspor	1–0	Türk Telekomspor
Kayserispor	1–0	MKE Kırıkkalespor
Denizlispor	3–1	Gaziantep BŞB

Source: Official page of 2005–06 Fortis Turkish Cup.

== Group stage ==
=== Group A ===
Pos	Team	Pld	W	D	L	GF	GA	GD	Pts	GAL	MAL	DYB	GRS	MİY
1	Galatasaray	4	3	1	0	11	1	+10	10				5–0	4–0
2	Malatyaspor	4	3	1	0	5	1	+4	10	1–1			2–0	
3	Diyarbakırspor	4	2	0	2	6	4	+2	6	0–1	0–1			
4	Giresunspor	4	1	0	3	3	10	−7	3			1–2		2–1
5	Mersin İdman Yurdu	4	0	0	4	2	11	−9	0		0–1	1–4		

Source: tff.org.tr
Legend: Blue = home team win; Yellow = draw; Red = away team win.
Matchday One

Diyarbakırspor	0–1	Malatyaspor

Galatasaray SK	4–0	Mersin İY

Matchday Two

Malatyaspor	1–1	Galatasaray SK

Giresunspor	1–2	Diyarbakırspor

Matchday Three

Mersin İY	0–1	Malatyaspor

Galatasaray SK	5–0	Giresunspor

Matchday Four

Diyarbakırspor	0–1	Galatasaray SK

Giresunspor	2–1	Mersin İY

Matchday Five

Malatyaspor	2–0	Giresunspor

Mersin İY	1–4	Diyarbakırspor

=== Group B ===
Pos	Team	Pld	W	D	L	GF	GA	GD	Pts	GAZ	FEN	KEC	MKE	TİY
1	Gaziantepspor	4	3	1	0	6	1	+5	10			2–0		1–0
2	Fenerbahçe SK	4	2	1	1	7	4	+3	7	0–2				4–0
3	Kayseri Erciyesspor	4	1	2	1	3	4	−1	5		0–0		2–1	
4	MKE Ankaragücü	4	1	1	2	8	9	−1	4	1–1	2–3			
5	Tarsus İdman Yurdu	4	0	1	3	4	10	−6	1			1–1	3–4	

Source: tff.org.tr
Legend: Blue = home team win; Yellow = draw; Red = away team win.
Matchday One

MKE Ankaragücü	2–3	Fenerbahçe SK

Gaziantepspor	2–0	K. Erciyesspor

Matchday Two

Fenerbahçe SK	0–2	Gaziantepspor

Tarsus İY	3–4	MKE Ankaragücü

Matchday Three

K. Erciyesspor	0–0	Fenerbahçe SK

Gaziantepspor	1–0	Tarsus İY

Matchday Four

MKE Ankaragücü	1–1	Gaziantepspor

Tarsus İY	1–1	K. Erciyesspor

Matchday Five

Fenerbahçe SK	4–0	Tarsus İY

K. Erciyesspor	2–1	MKE Ankaragücü

=== Group C ===
Pos	Team	Pld	W	D	L	GF	GA	GD	Pts	KAY	DEN	TRA	ALT	FKR
1	Kayserispor	4	3	0	1	11	3	+8	9		2–3			2–0
2	Denizlispor	4	3	0	1	8	5	+3	9				2–0	2–0
3	Trabzonspor	4	3	0	1	6	5	+1	9	0–3	3–1			
4	Altay SK	4	1	0	3	2	7	−5	3	0–4		0–1		
5	Fatih Karagümrük	4	0	0	4	1	8	−7	0			1–2	0–2	

Source: tff.org.tr
Legend: Blue = home team win; Yellow = draw; Red = away team win.
Matchday One

Denizlispor	2–0	Altay SK

Trabzonspor	0–3	Kayserispor

Matchday Two

Fatih Karagümrük	1–2	Trabzonspor

Kayserispor	2–3	Denizlispor

Matchday Three

Altay SK	0–4	Kayserispor

Denizlispor	2–0	Fatih Karagümrük

Matchday Four

Trabzonspor	3–1	Denizlispor

Fatih Karagümrük	0–2	Altay SK

Matchday Five

Altay SK	0–1	Trabzonspor

Kayserispor	2–0	Fatih Karagümrük

=== Group D ===
Pos	Team	Pld	W	D	L	GF	GA	GD	Pts	SAM	BJK	KON	İNG	SAR
1	Samsunspor	4	3	0	1	10	9	+1	9			5–3	2–1	
2	Beşiktaş J.K.	4	2	1	1	7	2	+5	7	3–0				3–0
3	Konyaspor	4	2	1	1	8	7	+1	7		1–1		2–0	
4	İnegölspor	4	1	1	2	3	5	−2	4		1–0			1–1
5	Sarıyer G.K.	4	0	1	3	4	9	−5	1	2–3		1–2		

Source: tff.org.tr
Legend: Blue = home team win; Yellow = draw; Red = away team win.
Matchday One

Konyaspor	1–1	Beşiktaş J.K.

Sarıyer SK	2–3	Samsunspor

Matchday Two

İnegölspor	1–1	Sarıyer SK

Samsunspor	5–3	Konyaspor

Matchday Three

Beşiktaş J.K.	3–0	Samsunspor

Konyaspor	2–0	İnegölspor

Matchday Four

Sarıyer SK	1–2	Konyaspor

İnegölspor	1–0	Beşiktaş J.K.

Matchday Five

Beşiktaş J.K.	3–0	Sarıyer SK

Samsunspor	2–1	İnegölspor

== Quarter-finals ==
Team 1	Agg.	Team 2	1st leg	2nd leg
Fenerbahçe	4–4 (a)	Galatasaray	2–1	2–3
Denizlispor	2–1	Samsunspor	1–0	1–1
Malatyaspor	1–2	Gaziantepspor	1–0	0–2
Beşiktaş	2–1	Kayserispor	2–0	0–1

Source: Official page of 2005–06 Fortis Turkish Cup.

== Semi-finals ==
=== Summary table ===
Team 1	Agg.	Team 2	1st leg	2nd leg
Gaziantepspor	1–5	Beşiktaş	1–3	0–2
Denizlispor	0–7	Fenerbahçe	0–4	0–3

Source: Official page of 2005–06 Fortis Turkish Cup.

=== 1st leg ===
5 April 2006 Semi-final	Gaziantepspor	1–3	Beşiktaş	Gaziantep
20:00 EEST (UTC+03)	Veysel 15'		Tümer 56'; Bobô 63', 76'	Stadium: Kamil Ocak Stadium; Referee: Bülent Yıldırım

6 April 2006 Semi-final	Denizlispor	0–4	Fenerbahçe	Denizli
20:00 EEST (UTC+03)			Deniz 24'; Mert 36'; Semih 63'; Mehmet A. 73'	Stadium: Denizli Atatürk Stadium; Referee: Tolga Özkalfa

=== 2nd leg ===
18 April 2006 Semi-final	Fenerbahçe	3–0	Denizlispor	Istanbul
20:02 EEST (UTC+03)	Mehmet Y. 16'; Semih 52', 73'			Stadium: Şükrü Saracoğlu Stadium; Referee: Halis Özkahya

19 April 2006 Semi-final	Beşiktaş	2–0	Gaziantepspor	Istanbul
20:00 EEST (UTC+03)	Gökhan 44'; Bobô 64'			Stadium: BJK İnönü Stadium; Referee: Çetin Sarıgül

== Final ==
3 May 2006 Final	Fenerbahçe	2–3 (a.e.t.)	Beşiktaş	İzmir, Turkey
20:00 EEST (UTC+03)	Alex 54'; Yozgatli 80'	Report	Metin 31', 115'; Güleç 35'	Stadium: İzmir Atatürk Stadyumu; Attendance: 51,295; Referee: Bülent Demirlek; Man of the Match: Tümer Metin
