= Vedran Runje =

Croatian former professional footballer (born 1976)

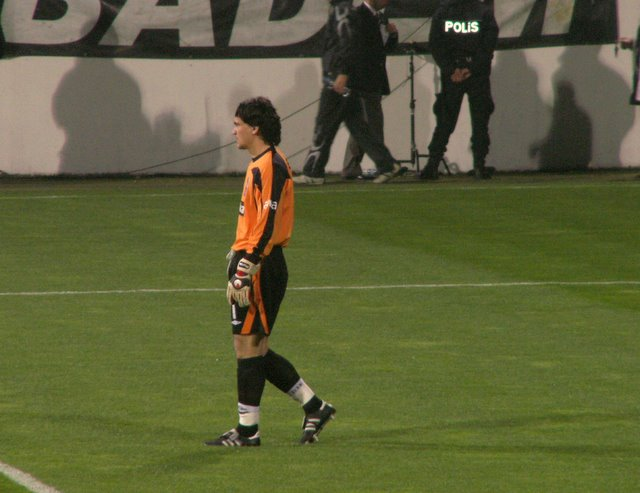
- Runje in 2007

Personal information
- Date of birth: 10 February 1976 (age 50)
- Place of birth: Sinj, SR Croatia, Yugoslavia
- Height: 1.87 m (6 ft 2 in)
- Position: Goalkeeper

Youth career
- Junak Sinj
- –1996: Hajduk Split

Senior career*
Years	Team	Apps	(Gls)
1996–1998	Hajduk Split	23	(0)
1998–2001	Standard Liège	100	(0)
2001–2004	Marseille	85	(0)
2004–2006	Standard Liège	68	(0)
2006–2007	Beşiktaş	32	(0)
2007–2011	Lens	133	(0)
Total		441	(0)

International career
1993–1996	Croatia U20	8	(0)
2006–2011	Croatia	22	(0)

Managerial career
- 2017–2021: Royal Antwerp (goalkeeping coach)
- 2021–: Porto (goalkeeping coach)
- * Club domestic league appearances and goals

Vedran Runje (Croatian pronunciation: [ʋědran rǔːɲe]; born 10 February 1976) is a Croatian retired footballer who played as a goalkeeper. A product of Hajduk Split academy, Runje spent the majority of his career abroad with Standard Liège in Belgium, Marseille and Lens in France and Beşiktaş in Turkey. With Standard, he won three Belgian League Goalkeeper of the Year awards.

Runje was also capped 22 times for Croatia national team and was part of the tournament squad at the UEFA Euro 2008.

== Club career ==
Runje began his professional career at Hajduk Split in 1996, but was unable to become a regular at the firstly team with first Tonči Gabrić, the Croatia national team's back-up goalkeeper at the time, and eventually young prospect Stipe Pletikosa being selected ahead of him. He eventually left the club in 1998 and joined Belgian side Standard Liège.

Runje played for Standard Liège until 2001, being named Belgian Goalkeeper of the Year in 1999 and 2001. He went on to join French club Marseille, where he was the first-choice goalkeeper over the following two and a half seasons. He helped Marseille qualify for the UEFA Champions League in 2003 and appeared in five of the club's six matches in the group stage of the competition in 2003–04. He was the club's first-choice goalkeeper until December 2003, losing his place following the arrival of Fabien Barthez in January 2004 and making no further appearances in the Ligue 1 and European competition until the end of the season.

Runje returned to Standard Liège in the summer of 2004, signing an initial three year deal. During his second spell with Standard, he won another Belgian Goalkeeper of the Year award in 2006. During the summer of the same year, he moved to Turkish side Beşiktaş. He was the first-choice goalkeeper at Beşiktaş during the 2006–07 season, making 32 Süper Lig appearances and also appearing in all of the club's six UEFA Cup matches during the season.

In the summer of 2007, Runje left Beşiktaş and returned to the French Ligue 1 after being signed by Lens. He appeared in all of the club's 38 matches in the Ligue 1 during the 2007–08 season, but was unable to prevent them from being relegated to the Ligue 2 after finishing 18th in the top flight. He also appeared in all of the club's six European matches during the season.

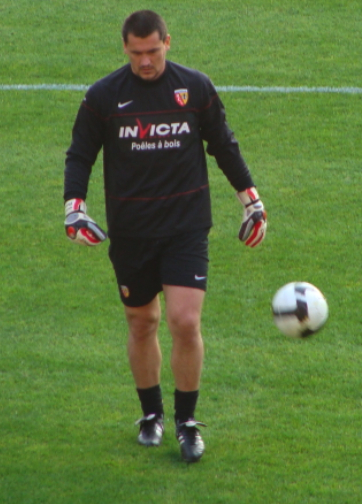
Runje with Lens in 2009

Despite rumours that he might be leaving the club following their relegation from the top flight, Runje decided to stay at Lens and eventually helped the club return to the Ligue 1 after only one season in the second division. Runje made 31 appearances in the Ligue 2 during the 2008–09 season as Lens finished top of the league. He kept his place as a regular for the club in the Ligue 1 and went on to make 32 league appearances during the 2009–10 season, only missing the final six league matches of the season due to an injury. Runje and Lens mutually parted ways on 2011, after the two sides agreed to terminate his contract.

== International career ==
Between 1993 and 1996, Runje won a total of 8 international caps for the Croatia national under-19 and under-21 teams. He also made one appearance for Croatia B in a friendly match against Romania in January 2001.

When Slaven Bilić was appointed Croatia's head coach in the summer of 2006, Runje started to play understudy to Stipe Pletikosa in the national team. He made his full international debut on 15 November 2006 in Croatia's UEFA Euro 2008 qualifier at Israel, which they won 4–3. His second appearance in the UEFA Euro 2008 qualifiers came in Croatia's 6–0 win at Andorra in September 2007, and he also made further two international appearances in Croatia's friendly matches against Bosnia and Herzegovina and Slovakia during the same year.

Runje was also a member of the Croatian 23-man squad at the UEFA Euro 2008 finals in Austria and Switzerland, making his only appearance in Croatia's final group game against Poland in Klagenfurt. He kept a clean sheet in a 1–0 victory for Croatia, who played the game with a second string of players, having already secured a place in the quarter-finals after beating Austria and Germany in their previous two matches at the tournament. His only other international appearance during the year 2008 came in a friendly match at Slovenia in August, where he replaced Pletikosa at half-time.

In June 2009, Runje was promoted first-choice goalkeeper at the Croatia national team after Pletikosa lost his place as a regular at his club, Spartak Moscow. His first appearance in the 2010 FIFA World Cup qualifiers was in Croatia's 2–2 draw at home to Ukraine on 6 June 2009. On 5 September 2009, he produced several good saves to help Croatia secure a 1–0 win at home to Belarus in the World Cup qualifiers, being seen by many as the Man of the Match. He also made several good saves in Croatia's next qualifier at England four days later, but was eventually unable to save the team from suffering a crushing 5–1 defeat. He was also responsible for England's fifth goal, failing to make a clearance after a back pass and enabling Wayne Rooney to score easily with an unguarded goal in front of him. Runje made a total of five appearances during the 2010 FIFA World Cup qualifying campaign, which saw Croatia failing to qualify for the finals after finishing third in their group. Runje's last official appearance for Croatia came in June 2011 against Georgia, where he helped Croatia win 2-1 for a Euro 2012 qualifying match.

== Personal life ==
Runje is married to his first love Tihana and they have a son Roko. Runje's younger brother Zlatko Runje was also a professional goalkeeper, who last played for NK Hrvace.

== Career statistics ==
=== Club ===
Appearances and goals by club, season and competition
Club	Season	League			National cup		League cup		Europe		Other		Total	
Club	Season	Division	Apps	Goals	Apps	Goals	Apps	Goals	Apps	Goals	Apps	Goals	Apps	Goals
Hajduk Split	1996–97	1. HNL	12	0	0	0	—		—		—		12	0
Hajduk Split	1997–98	1. HNL	11	0	0	0	—		1	0	—		12	0
Hajduk Split	Total		23	0	0	0	—		1	0	—		24	0
Standard Liège	1998–99	Belgian First Division	34	0	8	0	—		—		—		42	0
Standard Liège	1999–2000	Belgian First Division	32	0	6	0	—		—		—		38	0
Standard Liège	2000–01	Belgian First Division	34	0	2	0	—		6	0	—		42	0
Standard Liège	Total		100	0	16	0	—		6	0	—		122	0
Marseille	2001–02	French Division 1	33	0	2	0	2	0	—		—		37	0
Marseille	2002–03	Ligue 1	36	0	2	0	4	0	—		—		42	0
Marseille	2003–04	Ligue 1	16	0	0	0	1	0	7	0	—		24	0
Marseille	Total		85	0	4	0	7	0	7	0	—		103	0
Standard Liège	2004–05	Belgian First Division	34	0	2	0	—		6	0	—		42	0
Standard Liège	2005–06	Belgian First Division	34	0	5	0	—		—		—		39	0
Standard Liège	Total		68	0	7	0	—		6	0	—		81	0
Beşiktaş	2006–07	Süper Lig	32	0	8	0	—		6	0	1	0	47	0
Lens	2007–08	Ligue 1	38	0	0	0	0	0	6	0	—		44	0
Lens	2008–09	Ligue 2	31	0	1	0	3	0	—		—		35	0
Lens	2009–10	Ligue 1	32	0	3	0	2	0	—		—		37	0
Lens	2010–11	Ligue 1	32	0	0	0	0	0	—		—		32	0
Lens	Total		133	0	4	0	5	0	6	0	—		148	0
Career total			441	0	39	0	12	0	32	0	1	0	525	0

=== International ===
Appearances and goals by national team and year
National team	Year	Apps	Goals
Croatia	2006	1	0
Croatia	2007	3	0
Croatia	2008	2	0
Croatia	2009	6	0
Croatia	2010	6	0
Croatia	2011	4	0
Total		22	0

== Honours (as player) ==
Beşiktaş

- Turkish Cup: 2006–07
- Turkish Super Cup: 2006

Lens

- Ligue 2: 2008–09
- UEFA Intertoto Cup: 2007

Individual

- Belgian Goalkeeper of the Year: 1998–99, 2000–01, 2005–06
- Olympique de Marseille Player of the Season: 2001–02
- Ligue 2 Goalkeeper of the Year: 2008–09
- Ligue 2 UNFP Team of the Year: 2008–09

== Honours (as goalkeeping coach) ==
Royal Antwerp

- Belgian Cup: 2019–20

Porto

- Primeira Liga: 2021–22
- Taça de Portugal: 2021–22, 2022–23, 2023–24
- Taça da Liga: 2022–23
- Supertaça Cândido de Oliveira: 2022
