= İbrahim Toraman =

Turkish footballer (born 1981)

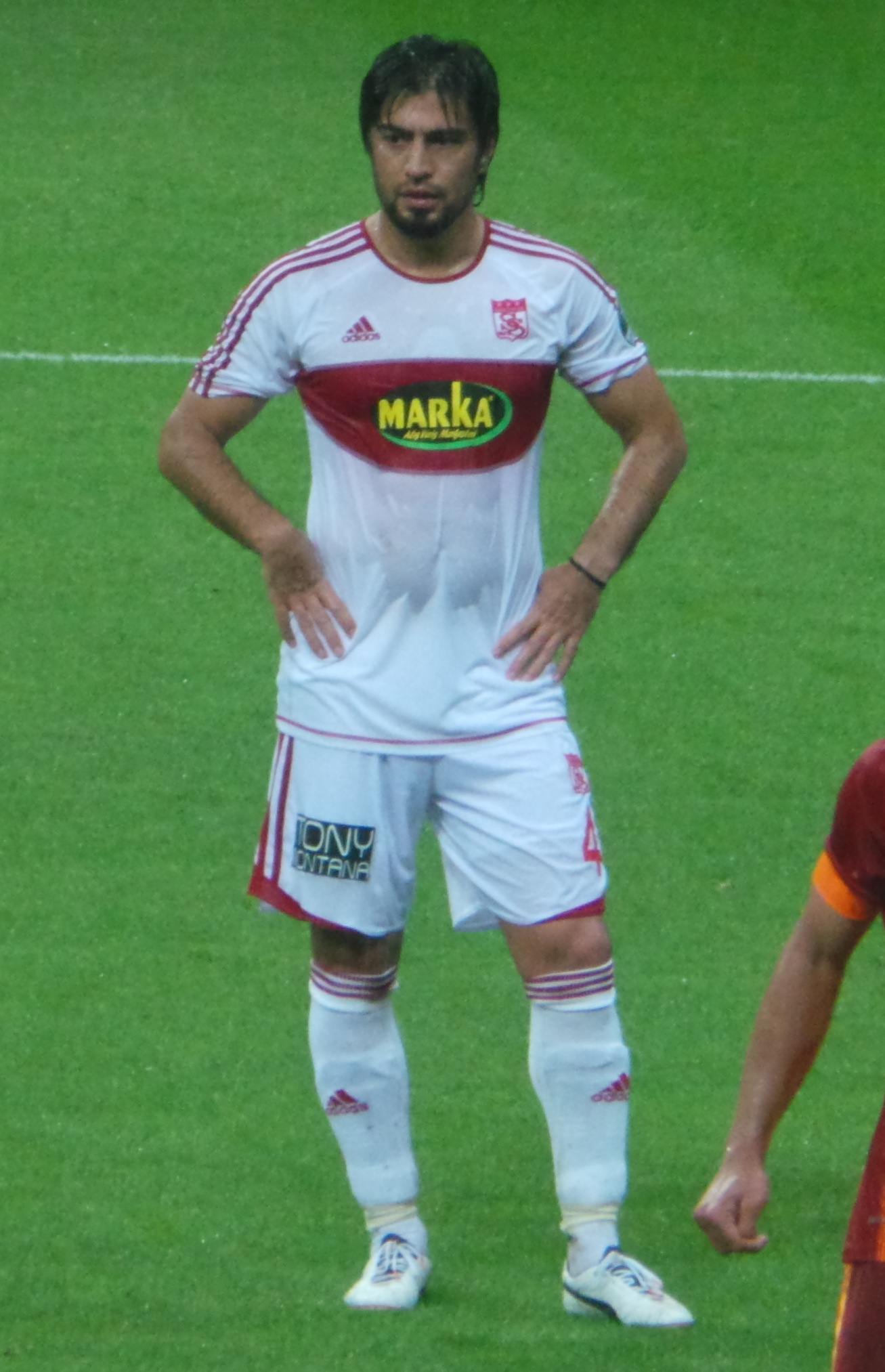
- Toraman with Sivasspor

Personal information
- Date of birth: 20 November 1981 (age 44)
- Place of birth: Sivas, Turkey
- Height: 1.79 m (5 ft 10 in)
- Positions: Centre-back; right-back

Youth career
- DSİ Sivas

Senior career*
Years	Team	Apps	(Gls)
1997–2004	Gaziantepspor	144	(20)
2004–2014	Beşiktaş	238	(19)
2014–2015	Sivasspor	10	(0)
Total		392	(39)

International career
2002–2010	Turkey	30	(1)
- * Club domestic league appearances and goals

İbrahim Toraman (born 20 November 1981) is a Turkish former professional footballer. He played as a defender in centre, right back or occasionally in defensive midfield positions.

== Career ==
Toraman's career started with local club Sivas DSİ Spor, playing six years at the amateur level. He was named second-best player out of all amateur level teams in Turkey. Professionally, Toraman played for Gaziantepspor and attracted attention with his success. In his last two years at Gaziantepspor, he was reportedly added to the top of many teams' transfer lists. Toraman was signed by Istanbul club Beşiktaş J.K. in the 2004–05 pre-season on a three-year contract with a transfer fee of $2.5 million.

Following the incident with Beşiktaş teammate Sezer Öztürk Toraman was left out of the Beşiktaş squad under Slaven Bilić's management at the start of the 2013–14 season.

Before the beginning of the 2014–15 season, he was loaned to Sivasspor.

== Career statistics ==
Score and result list Turkey's goal tally first, score column indicates score after Toraman goal.

International goal scored by İbrahim Toraman
No.	Date	Venue	Opponent	Score	Result	Competition
1	8 June 2005	Central Stadium, Almaty, Kazakhstan	Kazakhstan	2–0	6–0	2006 FIFA World Cup qualification

== Honours ==
Turkey

- FIFA Confederations Cup: third place 2003

Beşiktaş

- Süper Lig: 2008–09
- Turkish Cup: 2005–06, 2006–07, 2008–09, 2010–11
- Turkish Super Cup: 2006
