= Koray Avcı (footballer) =

Turkish footballer

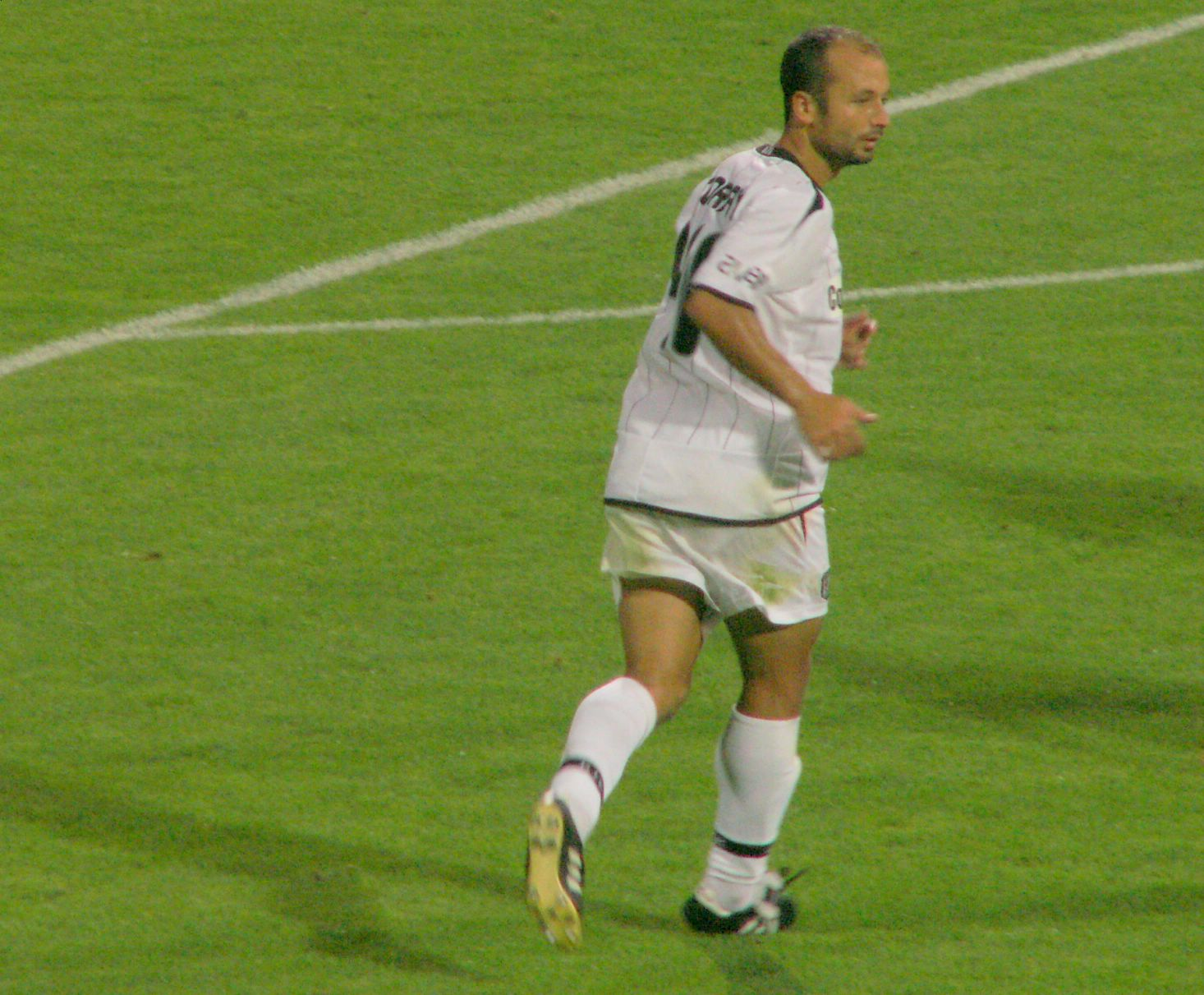

Personal information
- Full name: Mustafa Koray Avcı
- Date of birth: 19 May 1978 (age 48)
- Place of birth: İzmit, Turkey
- Height: 1.82 m (5 ft 11 1/2 in)
- Positions: Sweeper; midfielder

Youth career
- Kocaelispor

Senior career*
Years	Team	Apps	(Gls)
1997–1998	Türk Telekomspor	23	(1)
1998–1999	Batman Petrolspor	13	(1)
1999–2005	Çaykur Rizespor	114	(8)
2005–2007	Beşiktaş	82	(1)
2007–2008	Manisaspor	6	(0)
2008–2009	Gençlerbirliği	24	(1)
2009–2010	Kasımpaşa	27	(1)
2010–2011	Çaykur Rizespor	28	(1)
2011–2012	Şanlıurfaspor	33	(5)

International career
2004–2005	Turkey	6	(1)
- * Club domestic league appearances and goals

Mustafa Koray Avcı (pronounced [koɾaj avdʒɯ]; born 19 May 1978) is a Turkish former footballer.

== Career ==
Avcı was trained in the youth team of Kocaelispor and moved to Çaykur Rizespor. After five years in Rizespor, he was transferred to Beşiktaş by manager Rıza Çalımbay at the beginning of 2005. He has transferred to Manisaspor as part of a deal by two clubs to bring Filip Hološko to Beşiktaş.

Avcı's stay at Manisaspor was short lived however, as he transferred to Gençlerbirliği in July 2008.

In August 2009, he was moved to Kasımpaşa S.K.

== Career statistics ==
=== International goals ===
#	Date	Venue	Opponent	Score	Result	Competition
1.	30 March 2005	Mikheil Meskhi Stadium, Tbilisi, Georgia	Georgia	2–5	Win	2006 World Cup qual.
Correct as of 7 October 2015

== Honours ==
=== Club ===
Beşiktaş

- Turkish Cup: 2005–06, 2006–07
- Turkish Super Cup: 2006
