= Rize Atatürk Stadium =

Multi-purpose stadium in Rize, Turkey

Coordinates: 41°01′23.33″N 40°31′58.06″E

Rize Atatürk Stadium was a multi-purpose stadium in Rize, Turkey. It was used mostly for football matches and was the home ground of Çaykur Rizespor.

The stadium held 10,459 people.
