= İbrahim Akın (footballer) =

Turkish footballer (born 1984)

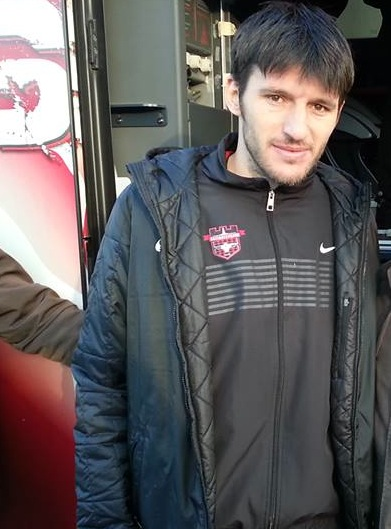
- Akın in 2013

Personal information
- Date of birth: 4 January 1984 (age 42)
- Place of birth: İzmir, Turkey
- Height: 1.82 m (6 ft 0 in)
- Position: Left winger

Team information
- Current team: Altay (management)

Senior career*
Years	Team	Apps	(Gls)
2001–2004	Altay	58	(24)
2004–2008	Beşiktaş	76	(14)
2008–2011	İstanbul Başakşehir	94	(24)
2012–2015	Gaziantepspor	29	(1)
2015–2016	Sivasspor	27	(2)
2016–2019	Altay	75	(10)
Total		359	(75)

International career
2004–2006	Turkey U21	17	(5)
2005–2006	Turkey	4	(0)
- * Club domestic league appearances and goals

İbrahim Akın (born 4 January 1984) is a Turkish former professional footballer who played as a left winger. He is a part of the management of Altay.

== Career ==
Akın started his career at Altay S.K. in the Türk Telekom League A before he was transferred to Beşiktaş in June 2004. After three seasons with Beşiktaş he was transferred to İstanbul BB where he scored 24 goals in 94 matches. Before the beginning of the 2012–13 season, he signed a contract with Gaziantepspor for three years.

== Later career ==
On 14 August 2019, it was confirmed, that Akın had retired from football and would continue as a part of Altay's management, working alongside the club's sporting director, Özden Töraydın, as responsible for the foreign players of the club.

== Involvement in match-fixing ==
In July 2011, Akın admitted to participating in match fixing, specifically relating to two matches: Istanbul BB's match against Fenerbahçe, and the Turkish Cup final against Beşiktaş. Following his arrest he withdrew his confession, claiming he had been tricked and his confession given under duress, and denied any involvement in the alleged corruption.

On 7 May 2012, the Turkish Football Federation gave a verdict for the people involved with the match-fixing case. The federation banned Akın for three years for allegedly fixing the result of a match when his team lost to Fenerbahçe 2–0 on 1 May 2011.

On 4 June 2012, the Arbitration Board of Turkish Football Federation reduced Akın's sentence from three years to two years.

== Honours ==
Beşiktaş

- Turkish Cup: 2005–06, 2006–07
- Turkish Super Cup: 2006
