= Fahri Tatan =

Turkish footballer (born 1983)

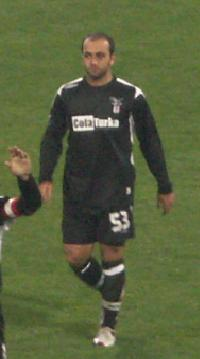

Personal information
- Full name: Fahri Tatan
- Date of birth: 30 May 1983 (age 43)
- Place of birth: Rize, Turkey
- Height: 1.75 m (5 ft 9 in)
- Position: Midfielder

Youth career
- Pazarspor
- 1999–2001: Fenerbahçe

Senior career*
Years	Team	Apps	(Gls)
2001–2003	Fenerbahçe	5	(0)
2003–2006	Çaykur Rizespor	82	(6)
2006–2008	Beşiktaş	15	(0)
2007–2008	→ Çaykur Rizespor (loan)	24	(4)
2008–2009	Konyaspor	23	(0)
2009–2010	Denizlispor	6	(0)
2010	Eskişehirspor	2	(0)
2010–2012	Adanaspor	42	(4)
2012–2013	Rizespor	37	(2)
2013	Kartalspor	7	(0)
2013–2014	Yeni Malatyaspor	27	(5)
2014–2016	Pendikspor	45	(6)
2016–2017	BB Erzurumspor	25	(3)
2017	Sakaryaspor	2	(0)
2017–2018	Şanlıurfaspor	16	(2)

International career
1999	Turkey U15	6	(3)
1999–2000	Turkey U16	28	(?)
2000–2001	Turkey U17	11	(?)
2001	Turkey U18	2	(?)
2001	Turkey U19	4	(?)
2002–2003	Turkey U20	8	(?)
2004–2006	Turkey U21	18	(?)
2006	Turkey A2	1	(1)
2006	Turkey	6	(0)
- * Club domestic league appearances and goals as of 14 May 2018

Fahri Tatan (born 30 May 1983, in Rize) is a Turkish former professional footballer.

== Club career ==
He was transferred from Beşiktaş in July 2008. He was loaned out to his old club Çaykur Rizespor for the 2007–2008 season. He played also for Pazarspor and Fenerbahçe.

=== Eskişehirspor ===
On 18 January 2010, Fahri joined Süper Lig club Eskişehirspor on a 1,5 year deal.

=== Adanaspor ===
In August 2010, Fahri signed a new deal with Adanaspor.

== International career ==
Fahri has made eight appearances for the Turkey national football team. He made his debut entering as a second-half substitute in a friendly against Azerbaijan on 12 April 2006.

== Honours ==
Beşiktaş

- Turkish Cup: 2006–07
- Turkish Super Cup: 2006
