= Gökhan Zan =

Turkish footballer (born 1981)

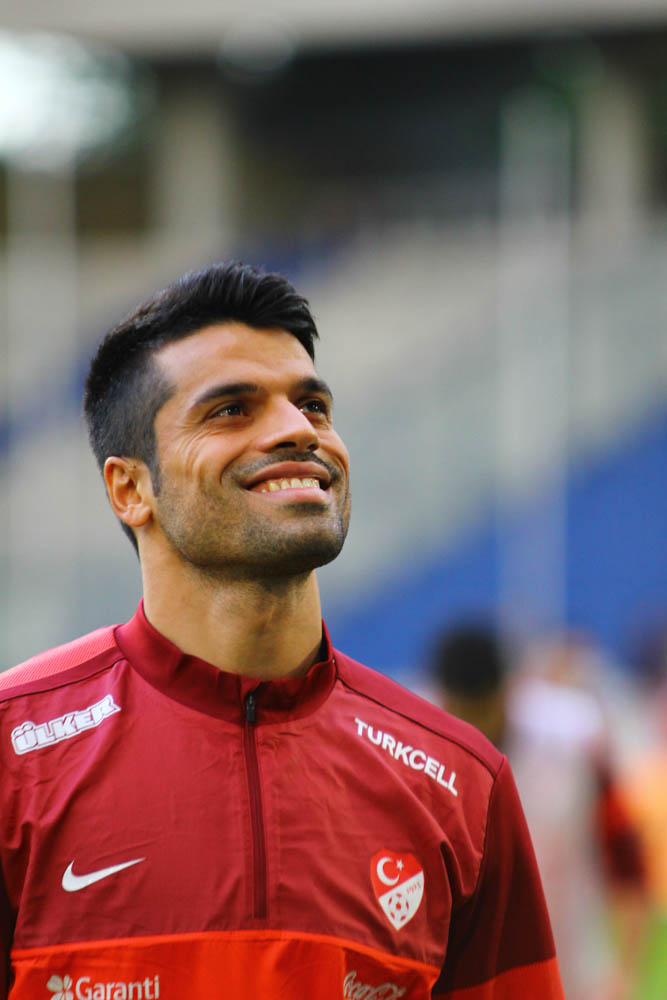
- Zan in 2013

Personal information
- Date of birth: 7 September 1981 (age 45)
- Place of birth: Antakya, Hatay, Turkey
- Height: 1.93 m (6 ft 4 in)
- Position: Centre-back

Youth career
- 1997–1998: Hatayspor

Senior career*
| Years | Team | Apps | (Gls) |
| 1999–2000 | Hatayspor | 12 | (2) |
| 2000–2003 | Çanakkale Dardanelspor | 80 | (9) |
| 2003–2009 | Beşiktaş | 69 | (4) |
| 2004–2005 | → Gaziantepspor (loan) | 29 | (0) |
| 2009–2015 | Galatasaray | 56 | (3) |
| Total | | 246 | (18) |

International career
| 2000 | Turkey U19 | 2 | (0) |
| 2002–2003 | Turkey U21 | 7 | (0) |
| 2006–2013 | Turkey | 36 | (0) |
- * Club domestic league appearances and goals

Gökhan Zan (born 7 September 1981) is a Turkish former professional footballer who played as a centre-back.

== Club career ==
Zan was born in Antakya to an Arab family. He started his career with Hatayspor and then moved on to Çanakkale Dardanelspor before joining Beşiktaş in 2003. He needed time to make his mark with the Turkish giants, and spent a spell on loan with Gaziantepspor before returning to the İnönü Stadium.

=== Galatasaray ===
Following 2008–09 season-end, Zan could not negotiate a deal with Beşiktaş. On 22 June 2009, it had been announced that Zan made a deal with Galatasaray for a period of two years starting from 2009–10 season. In further rumours, it has been written on papers that Zan had never been called by Beşiktaş in order to negotiate after his contract had been expired, which was dealt for two years within an optional second season. After 20 days with no proposal from the club, Zan have accepted Galatasaray's offer.

On 27 June 2011, Zan signed a new contract, with €700,000 per annum wage plus €20,000 per game. He scored his first goal for the club on the second half of the 2010–11 Süper Lig season which came in the first half as the game ended in a 1–1 draw against Kayserispor. Zan played 12 matches on the 2011–12 Süper Lig season and scored 2 goals, one against Eskişehirspor in 2–0 win and the other in a 4–0 win against Ankaragücü. He was part of Galatasaray's champion squad.

In early April 2013, his contract was extended for another two-years until 2015.

== International career ==
Zan emerged as a key man for Turkey in their Euro 2008 qualifying push, starring in seven games for Fatih Terim's side. At the tournament itself, Zan made three appearances after he was initially injured in the opening game against Portugal. He has appeared in two qualifying matches for the 2010 FIFA World Cup.

== Career statistics ==
As of 22 December 2013

=== Club ===
Appearances and goals by club, season and competition
| Club | Season | League | | Cup | | League Cup | | Europe | | Total | |
| Club | Season | Apps | Goals | Apps | Goals | Apps | Goals | Apps | Goals | Apps | Goals |
|---|---|---|---|---|---|---|---|---|---|---|---|
| Hatayspor | 1999–2000 | 12 | 2 | – | | – | | - | | 12 | 2 |
| Çanakkale Dardanelspor | 2000–01 | 29 | 2 | 2 | 0 | – | | – | | 31 | 2 |
| Çanakkale Dardanelspor | 2001–02 | 25 | 3 | 2 | 0 | – | | – | | 27 | 3 |
| Çanakkale Dardanelspor | 2002–03 | 26 | 4 | 2 | 1 | – | | – | | 28 | 5 |
| Çanakkale Dardanelspor | Total | 80 | 9 | 6 | 1 | 0 | 0 | 0 | 0 | 86 | 10 |
| Beşiktaş | 2003–04 | 2 | 0 | 2 | 0 | – | | – | | 4 | 0 |
| Beşiktaş | 2005–06 | 11 | 0 | 3 | 0 | 1 | 0 | 2 | 0 | 17 | 0 |
| Beşiktaş | 2006–07 | 24 | 3 | 6 | 0 | – | | 2 | 0 | 32 | 3 |
| Beşiktaş | 2007–08 | 20 | 0 | 1 | 0 | – | | 4 | 0 | 25 | 0 |
| Beşiktaş | 2008–09 | 19 | 1 | 7 | 0 | – | | – | | 26 | 1 |
| Beşiktaş | Total | 74 | 4 | 17 | 0 | 1 | 0 | 8 | 0 | 100 | 4 |
| Gaziantepspor (loan) | 2004–05 | 29 | 1 | 3 | 1 | – | | – | | 32 | 2 |
| Galatasaray | 2009–10 | 9 | 0 | 1 | 0 | - | | 6 | 0 | 16 | 0 |
| Galatasaray | 2010–11 | 15 | 1 | 2 | 0 | - | | 0 | 0 | 17 | 1 |
| Galatasaray | 2011–12 | 12 | 2 | 1 | 0 | 0 | 0 | - | | 13 | 2 |
| Galatasaray | 2012–13 | 10 | 0 | 2 | 0 | 0 | 0 | 3 | 0 | 15 | 0 |
| Galatasaray | 2013–14 | 9 | 0 | 1 | 0 | 1 | 0 | 3 | 0 | 14 | 0 |
| Galatasaray | Total | 55 | 4 | 7 | 0 | 1 | 0 | 12 | 0 | 75 | 4 |
| Career total | | 0 | 0 | 0 | 0 | 0 | 0 | 0 | 0 | 0 | 22 |

=== International ===
Appearances and goals by national team and year
| National team | Year | Apps | Goals |
|---|---|---|---|
| Turkey | 2006 | 10 | 0 |
| Turkey | 2007 | 6 | 0 |
| Turkey | 2008 | 11 | 0 |
| Turkey | 2009 | 4 | 0 |
| Turkey | 2010 | 2 | 0 |
| Turkey | 2011 | 2 | 0 |
| Turkey | 2012 | 0 | 0 |
| Turkey | 2013 | 1 | 0 |
| Total | | 36 | 0 |

== Honours ==
Beşiktaş

- Süper Lig: 2008–09
- Türkiye Kupası: 2005–06, 2006–07, 2008–09
- Süper Kupa: 2006

Galatasaray

- Süper Lig: 2011–12, 2012–13, 2014–15
- Türkiye Kupası: 2013–14
- Süper Kupa: 2012, 2013

Turkey

- UEFA European Championship bronze medalist: 2008
