= 2006–07 Turkish Cup =

Fortis Türkiye Kupası
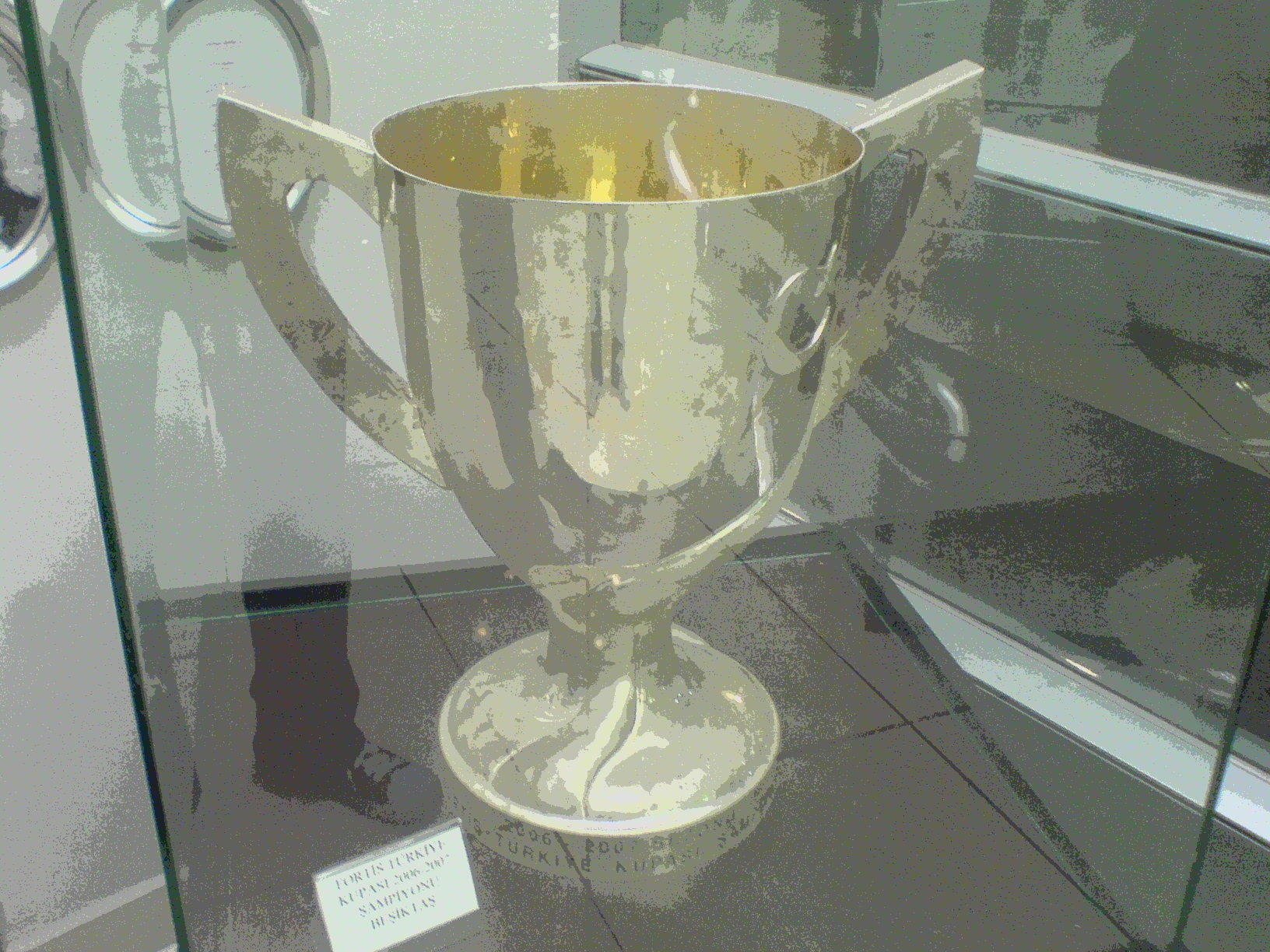
- Picture of the 2006–07 Turkish Cup Trophy, won by Beşiktaş.

Tournament details
- Country: Turkey
- Teams: 72

Final positions
- Champions: Beşiktaş J.K.
- Runners-up: Kayseri Erciyesspor

Tournament statistics
- Top goal scorer(s): Bobô; Semih Şentürk (7 goals each)

The 2006–07 Turkey Cup was the 45th edition of the annual tournament that determined the association football Süper Lig Turkish Cup (Turkish: Türkiye Kupası) champion under the auspices of the Turkish Football Federation (Turkish: Türkiye Futbol Federasyonu; TFF). This tournament was conducted under the UEFA Cup system having replaced at the 44th edition a standard knockout competition scheme. The results of the tournament also determined which clubs would be promoted or relegated.

== First qualifying round ==
Team 1	Score	Team 2
Bucaspor	2–1	Fethiyespor
Alanyaspor	2–0	Mersin Idman Yurdu
Eskişehirspor	1–0	Uşakspor
Yimpaş Yozgatspor	1–1 (6–7 p)	Gençlerbirliği OFTAŞ
B.B. Gaziantep	2–0	Diyarbakirspor
Malatyaspor	1–2	Elazığspor
Samsunspor	1–0	Arsinspor
Istanbulspor	1–0	Zeytinburnuspor
Kartalspor	2–5	B. B. Istanbul
Kasımpaşa S.K.	2–2 (4–1 p)	Dardanelspor
İnegölspor	4–0	Kocaelispor
Şekerspor	1–4	Gebzespor
Sebatspor	2–1	Ünyespor
Erzincanspor	1–2	Orduspor
Keçiörengücü	3–2	Telekomspor
Siirtspor	1–1 (5–4 p)	Gaskispor
Kahramanmaraşspor	1–2	Mardinspor
Karşıyaka S.K.	2–0	Altay S.K.

Source: Official page of 2006–07 Fortis Turkish Cup.

== Second qualifying round ==
Team 1	Score	Team 2
Gençlerbirliği	1–0	B.B. Gaziantep
Gebzespor	1–2	Konyaspor
Bucaspor	2–1	Sakaryaspor
Elazığspor	1–2	Ankaragücü
Istanbulspor	0–5	Manisaspor
Gençlerbirliği OFTAŞ	0–1	İnegölspor
Samsunspor	1–0	Arsinspor
Mardinspor	1–2	Kayserispor
Siirtspor	1–4	Rizespor
Orduspor	2–3	Erciyesspor
Keçiörengücü	2–4	Gaziantepspor
Şekerspor	1–4	Gebzespor
Antalyaspor	0–1	Eskişehirspor
Karşıyaka S.K.	3–2	Denizlispor
Keçiörengücü	3–2	Telekomspor
Sivasspor	3–0	Alanyaspor
Ankaraspor	4–0	Kasımpaşa S.K.
Bursaspor	3–0	Akçaabat Sebatspor
B. B. Istanbul	2–2 (4–3 p)	Samsunspor

Source: Official page of 2006–07 Fortis Turkish Cup.

== Group stage ==
Group stage was played in 4 groups with five teams in each, in a one-leg league system.

=== Group A ===
Pos	Team	Pld	W	D	L	GF	GA	GD	Pts	GAL	KEC	KAY	BUR	KSK
1	Galatasaray	4	3	0	1	6	6	0	9			1–0	2–1	
2	Kayseri Erciyesspor	4	2	1	1	10	7	+3	7	4–1				1–1
3	Kayserispor	4	2	1	1	5	2	+3	7		3–1		0–0	
4	Bursaspor	4	1	1	2	5	7	−2	4		2–4			2–1
5	Karşıyaka	4	0	1	3	3	7	−4	1	1–2		0–2		

Source: TFF.orghttps://www.tff.org/default.aspx?pageID=601
Legend: Blue = home team win; Yellow = draw; Red = away team win.

=== Group B ===
Pos	Team	Pld	W	D	L	GF	GA	GD	Pts	MAN	TRA	KON	ESK	ANK
1	Vestel Manisaspor	4	2	1	1	9	4	+5	7		1–1		6–1	
2	Trabzonspor	4	1	3	0	7	4	+3	6			1–1	5–2	
3	Konyaspor	4	1	2	1	7	7	0	5	1–0				2–2
4	Eskişehirspor	4	1	1	2	7	14	−7	4			4–3		0–0
5	Ankaraspor	4	0	3	1	3	4	−1	3	1–2	0–0			

Source: TFF.org
Legend: Blue = home team win; Yellow = draw; Red = away team win.

=== Group C ===
Pos	Team	Pld	W	D	L	GF	GA	GD	Pts	FEN	GAZ	İNE	SIV	IBB
1	Fenerbahçe	4	4	0	0	17	0	+17	12		2–0	6–0		
2	Gaziantepspor	4	3	0	1	7	2	+5	9			5–0	1–0	
3	İnegölspor	4	1	1	2	5	14	−9	4				3–1	2–2
4	Sivasspor	4	1	0	3	2	8	−6	3	0–4				1–0
5	Istanbul B.B.	4	0	1	3	2	9	−7	1	0–5	0–1			

Source: TFF.org
Legend: Blue = home team win; Yellow = draw; Red = away team win.

=== Group D ===
Pos	Team	Pld	W	D	L	GF	GA	GD	Pts	GEN	BJK	MKE	BUC	ÇYR
1	Gençlerbirliği	4	3	0	1	6	1	+5	9		3–0	0–1		
2	Beşiktaş	4	3	0	1	10	6	+4	9			2–1		3–1
3	MKE Ankaragücü	4	3	0	1	7	4	+3	9				3–1	2–1
4	Bucaspor	4	1	0	3	3	10	−7	3	0–2	1–5			
5	Çaykur Rizespor	4	0	0	4	2	7	−5	0	0–1			0–1	

Source: TFF.org
Legend: Blue = home team win; Yellow = draw; Red = away team win.

== Quarter-finals ==
Team 1	Agg.	Team 2	1st leg	2nd leg
Fenerbahçe	3–1	Gençlerbirliği	2–1	1–0
Trabzonspor	2–1	Gaziantepspor	1–0	1–1
Beşiktaş	4–2	Vestel Manisaspor	4–0	0–2
Kayseri Erciyesspor	1–1 (a)	Galatasaray	0–0	1–1

Source: Official page of 2006–07 Fortis Turkish Cup.

== Semi-finals ==
=== Summary table ===
Team 1	Agg.	Team 2	1st leg	2nd leg
Trabzonspor	1–1 (4–5 p)	Kayseri Erciyesspor	0–1	1–0 (a.e.t.)
Beşiktaş	2–1	Fenerbahçe	1–0	1–1 (a.e.t.)

Source: Official page of 2006–07 Fortis Turkish Cup.

=== 1st leg ===
11 April 2006 Semi-final	Trabzonspor	0–1	Kayseri Erciyesspor	Trabzon
16:00 EEST (UTC+03)			Lazarov 81'	Stadium: Hüseyin Avni Aker Stadium; Referee: Selçuk Dereli

11 April 2006 Semi-final	Beşiktaş	1–0	Fenerbahçe	Istanbul
20:00 EEST (UTC+03)	Bobô 82'			Stadium: BJK İnönü Stadium; Referee: Fırat Aydınus

=== 2nd leg ===
25 April 2006 Semi-final	Kayseri Erciyesspor	0–1 (a.e.t.) (5–4 p)	Trabzonspor	Kayseri
20:00 EEST (UTC+03)			Umut 61'	Stadium: Kayseri Atatürk Stadium; Referee: Cüneyt Çakır
	Penalties
	Umut (penalty scored); Ibrahim (penalty scored); Celaleddin (penalty scored); Gökdeniz Karadeniz (penalty scored); Ömer (penalty missed); Hüseyin (penalty missed)		(penalty scored) Lazarov; (penalty scored) Cenk; (penalty scored) Kürşat; (penalty scored) Mehmet; (penalty missed) Emre; (penalty scored) Ergün

26 April 2006 Semi-final	Fenerbahçe	1–1 (a.e.t.)	Beşiktaş	Istanbul
20:01 EEST (UTC+03)	Tümer 56'		Mert 102'	Stadium: Şükrü Saracoğlu Stadium; Referee: Selçuk Dereli

== Final ==
9 May 2007 Final	Kayseri Erciyesspor	0–1	Beşiktaş	İzmir, Turkey
20:00 EEST (UTC+03)		Report	Bobo 101'	Stadium: İzmir Atatürk Stadium; Attendance: 40,000; Referee: İsmet Arzuman; Man of the Match: Bobo

Source: Official page of 2006–07 Fortis Turkish Cup.
