= Márcio Nobre =

Brazilian footballer

Márcio Nobre Mert Nobre
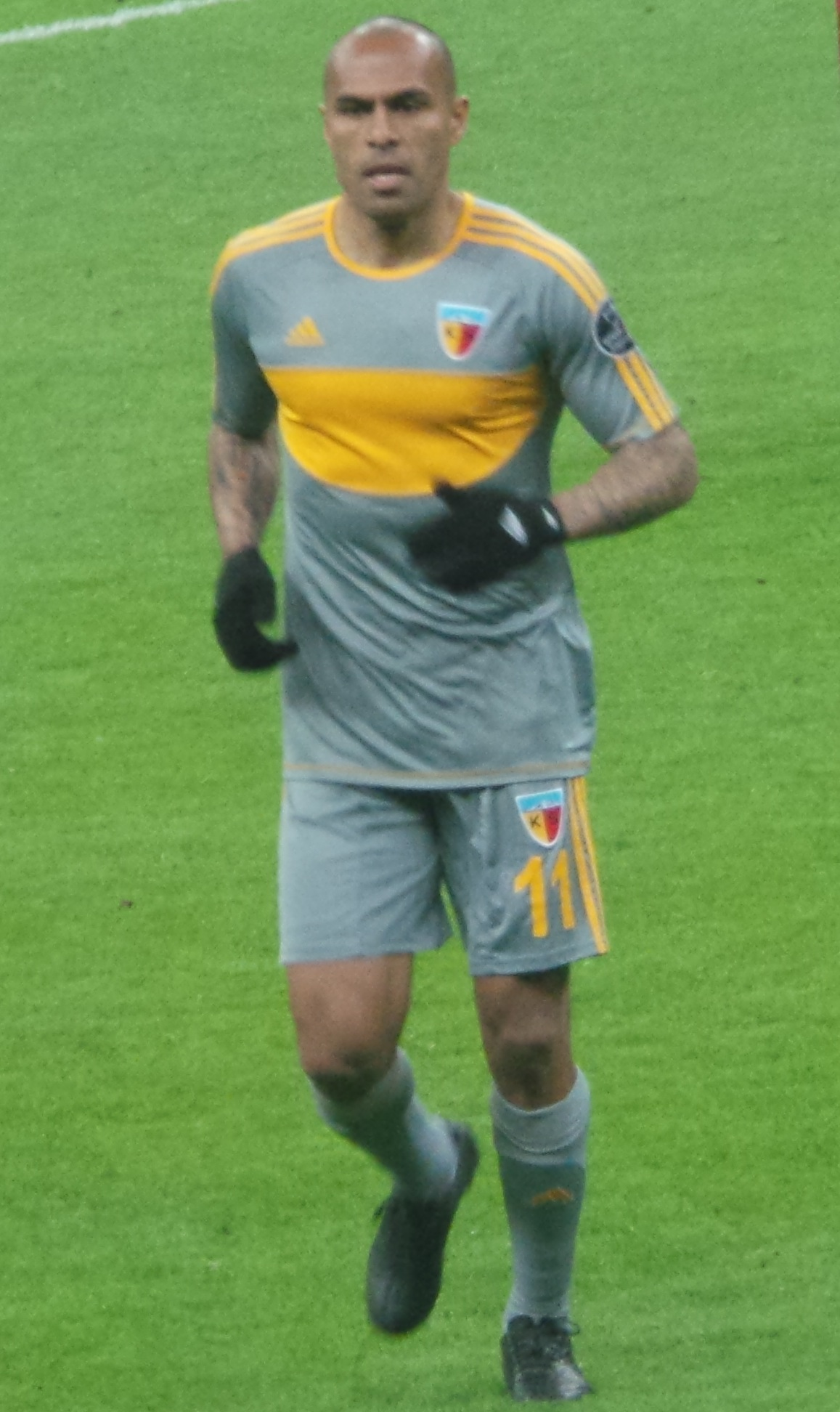
- Nobre playing for Kayserispor in 2014

Personal information
- Full name: Márcio Ferreira Nobre
- Date of birth: November 6, 1980 (age 46)
- Place of birth: Jateí, Brazil
- Height: 1.83 m (6 ft 0 in)
- Position: Striker

Senior career*
Years	Team	Apps	(Gls)
1999–2002	Paraná	50	(67)
2002–2004	Cruzeiro	15	(3)
2003	→ Kashiwa Reysol (loan)	13	(0)
2004–2006	Fenerbahçe	80	(46)
2006–2011	Beşiktaş	127	(35)
2011–2013	Mersin İdmanyurdu	56	(23)
2013–2015	Kayserispor	53	(21)
2015–2016	FC Wil	24	(7)
2016–2018	BB Erzurumspor	59	(25)
2018–2019	Gençlerbirliği	25	(6)
Total		502	(233)

Managerial career
- 2019–2020: Akhisar Belediyespor (assistant)
- 2020: Hatayspor (assistant)
- 2020: Gençlerbirliği
- 2021–2022: Altay (assistant)
- 2022: Altay
- 2022: Çorum
- * Club domestic league appearances and goals

Márcio Ferreira Nobre (born November 6, 1980), also known as Mert Nobre, is a Brazilian professional football manager and former footballer.

Nobre spent about 15 years in Turkey as a football player. He acquired Turkish citizenship in 2006, adopting the given name Mert upon acquisition. Nobre also got his first managerial job in Turkey, when he was named the manager of Gençlerbirliği in August 2020.

== Career statistics ==
=== Managerial record ===
As of match played 30 October 2022

Managerial record by team and tenure
Team	Nat	From	To	Record							
Team	Nat	From	To	G	W	D	L	GF	GA	GD	Win %
Gençlerbirliği	(Turkey)	4 August 2020	10 November 2020	7	1	2	4	5	9	−4	14.29
Altay	(Turkey)	13 January 2022	26 January 2022	3	0	0	3	1	5	−4	0.00
Çorum	(Turkey)	14 July 2022	31 October 2022	12	5	2	5	19	17	+2	41.67
Total				22	6	4	12	25	31	−6	27.27

== Club career ==
Márcio Ferreira Nobre began his professional football career in his native Brazil, debuting for Paraná Clube in 1999. Following his success at Paraná, he secured a move to Cruzeiro in 2003, though his time there was brief and included a short loan spell in Japan with J.League side Kashiwa Reysol.

In January 2004, Nobre made a pivotal career move by joining Turkish giants Fenerbahçe. He quickly adapted to the Süper Lig, becoming a prolific striker. Over two and a half seasons, he scored 46 league goals in 80 appearances and helped Fenerbahçe secure consecutive Süper Lig titles in the 2003–04 and 2004–05 seasons.

Seeking a new challenge, Nobre controversially transferred to Fenerbahçe's fierce Istanbul rivals, Beşiktaş, in 2006. He remained with Beşiktaş for five years, making over 120 league appearances. During his tenure, he played a crucial role in the club's domestic success, winning the Süper Lig in the 2008–09 season and multiple Turkish Cup titles, notably featuring as a substitute in the 2009 cup final victory over his former club Fenerbahçe.

Nobre left Beşiktaş in 2011 and spent the remainder of his playing career transitioning between several Turkish clubs, with a brief stint in Switzerland. He played for Mersin İdmanyurdu (2011–2013) and Kayserispor (2013–2015), maintaining steady goalscoring numbers. In 2015, he joined Swiss Challenge League side FC Wil, scoring 7 goals in 24 appearances, before returning to Turkey a year later to join BB Erzurumspor. He concluded his playing career with Gençlerbirliği in the TFF First League, retiring in 2019 at the age of 38 to transition into a managerial career.

== International career ==
Despite being born in Brazil and maintaining a high profile in top-flight football, Márcio Nobre never received a call-up to the Brazil national football team at any level.

In 2006, after meeting the necessary residency requirements during his successful tenure in Turkish football, Nobre acquired Turkish citizenship. Upon his naturalization, he adopted the Turkish first name "Mert" to comply with local customs for naturalized players, becoming officially known as Mert Nobre within the country. His naturalization occurred during a period when the Turkey national football team was actively considering integrating foreign-born players from the Süper Lig, a trend highlighted by the successful integration of his fellow Brazilian, Mehmet Aurélio. However, despite gaining citizenship and remaining an eligible, high-profile striker in Turkey for several more years, Nobre was never capped for the Turkish national team.
