= 2010–11 Mersin İdmanyurdu season =

Mersin İdmanyurdu
2010–11 season
- President: (Turkey) Ali Kahramanlı
- Head coach: (Turkey) Yüksel Yeşilova (till 17 October 2010) (Turkey) Nurullah Sağlam (since 20 October 2010)
- Stadium: Tevfik Sırrı Gür Stadium; Mersin, Turkey (Capacity: 10,128)
- TFF First League: 1st (champions) (Promoted)
- Turkish Cup: Eliminated at Play-offs Round
- Most appearances: (Turkey) Kerem İnan (32)
- Top goalscorer: League: (Turkey) Adem Büyük (10); All: (Turkey) Adem Büyük (10)
| Home colours | Away colours | Third colours |

Mersin İdmanyurdu (also Mersin İdman Yurdu, Mersin İY, or MİY) Sports Club; located in Mersin, east Mediterranean coast of Turkey in 2010–2011. The 2010–11 season was the 6th season of Mersin İdmanyurdu football team in TFF First League, the second level division in Turkey since 2001–02. MİY has taken place 33rd time in the second-level football division since its foundation in 1963–64. At the end of the season the team finished the league at first place and promoted to Spor–Toto Super League after 28 seasons.

Ali Kahramanlı was president of the club. Yüksel Yeşilova was head coach at the start of the season. After 8th round Nurullah Sağlam took over the position. Goalkeeper and team captain Kerem İnan was the most appeared player with 32 appearances, while Adem Büyük, who was loaned in the mid-season became the season top goalscorer with 10 goals.

== Pre-season ==
Pre-season preparation games resulted as follows (at Kızılcahamam camp):

- 15.07.2010. MİY-Antalyaspor (then Turkish Süper lig team): 0–0,
- 18.07.2010. MİY-Azal (Azerbaijan Super League team): 1–1.
- 22.07.2010. MİY-Mogan (Azerbaijan Super League team): 1–2.

== 2010–11 TFF First League participation ==
TFF First League was played as "Bank Asya Birinci Lig" in 2010–11 due to sponsorship reasons. 17 teams attended. The winners and runners-up were promoted to 2011–12 Süper Lig. The third team to be promoted was determined through promotion play-off games. Bottom two teams were relegated to 2011–12 TFF Second League. MİY attended 6th time to the league in its 10th season and finished at top, gaining direct promotion to 2011–12 Süper Lig at the end of the season.

=== Results summary ===
Mersin İdmanyurdu (MİY) 2010–11 TFF First League season league summary:

| | Overall | | | | | | | | | Home | | | | | | | | Away | | | | | | | |
| Stage | Pc | Pl | W | D | L | GF | GA | GD | Pt | Pl | W | D | L | GF | GA | GD | Pt | Pl | W | D | L | GF | GA | GD | Pt |
|---|---|---|---|---|---|---|---|---|---|---|---|---|---|---|---|---|---|---|---|---|---|---|---|---|---|
| First half | 9 | 16 | 6 | 5 | 5 | 15 | 20 | -5 | 23 | 7 | 4 | 0 | 3 | 9 | 12 | -3 | 12 | 9 | 2 | 5 | 2 | 6 | 8 | -2 | 11 |
| Second half | | 16 | 11 | 2 | 3 | 24 | 9 | +15 | 35 | 9 | 6 | 1 | 2 | 16 | 6 | +10 | 19 | 7 | 5 | 1 | 1 | 8 | 3 | +5 | 16 |
| Overall | 1 | 32 | 17 | 7 | 8 | 39 | 29 | +10 | 58 | 16 | 10 | 1 | 5 | 25 | 18 | +7 | 31 | 16 | 7 | 6 | 3 | 14 | 11 | +3 | 27 |

Sources: 2010–11 TFF First League pages.

=== League table ===
Mersin İdmanyurdu (MİY) 2010–11 TFF First League season standing in league table after normal season:

| Pos | Team | Pld | W | D | L | GF | GA | GD | Pts | Qualification or relegation |
|---|---|---|---|---|---|---|---|---|---|---|
| 1 | Mersin İdmanyurdu (C, P) | 32 | 17 | 7 | 8 | 39 | 29 | +10 | 58 | Promotion to Süper Lig |
| 2 | Samsunspor (P) | 32 | 16 | 10 | 6 | 45 | 20 | +25 | 58 | Promotion to Süper Lig |
| 3 | Gaziantep B.B. | 32 | 16 | 9 | 7 | 43 | 26 | +17 | 57 | Qualification for Promotion Playoffs |
| 4 | Çaykur Rizespor | 32 | 15 | 9 | 8 | 36 | 24 | +12 | 54 | Qualification for Promotion Playoffs |
| 5 | Orduspor (O, P) | 32 | 14 | 12 | 6 | 47 | 29 | +18 | 54 | Qualification for Promotion Playoffs |

Source: TFF First League page
Rules for classification: 1) points; 2) goal difference; 3) number of goals scored.
(C) Champions; (O) Play-off winners; (P) Promoted

=== Results by round ===
Results of games MİY played in 2010–11 TFF First League by rounds:

| Round | 1 | 2 | 3 | 4 | 5 | 6 | 7 | 8 | 9 | 10 | 11 | 12 | 13 | 14 | 15 | 16 | 17 | 18 | 19 | 20 | 21 | 22 | 23 | 24 | 25 | 26 | 27 | 28 | 29 | 30 | 31 | 32 | 33 | 34 |
|---|---|---|---|---|---|---|---|---|---|---|---|---|---|---|---|---|---|---|---|---|---|---|---|---|---|---|---|---|---|---|---|---|---|---|
| Ground | A | H | A | H | A | H | A | H | A | H | A | H | A | H | A | A | B | H | A | H | A | H | A | H | A | H | A | H | A | H | A | H | H | B |
| Result | D | W | D | W | D | L | D | L | D | L | L | W | W | W | W | L | | D | D | W | W | W | W | L | W | W | L | W | W | L | W | W | W | |
| Position | 8 | 5 | 5 | 5 | 6 | 6 | 6 | 8 | 8 | 9 | 13 | 10 | 9 | 7 | 5 | 8 | 9 | 9 | 9 | 8 | 8 | 7 | 4 | 6 | 5 | 4 | 4 | 3 | 2 | 2 | 2 | 2 | 2 | 1 |

Updated to match(es) played on 15 May 2011. Source: TFF League page
A = Away; H = Home; B = Bye; W = Win; D = Draw; L = Loss

=== First half ===
Mersin İdmanyurdu (MİY) 2010–11 TFF First League season first half game reports is shown in the following table. Kick off times are in EET and EEST.

| 22 August 2010 Round 1 | Adanaspor | 0–0 | Mersin İdmanyurdu | 5 Ocak Stadium, Adana |
| Friday, 21:00 | Koray Şanlı (yellow card) 42' | Report | (yellow card) 34' Mustafa Aydın; (yellow card) 47' Şehmus Özer; (yellow card) 87' Tuna Kaya | Referee: Özgüç Türkalp |

| 29 August 2010 Round 2 | Mersin İdmanyurdu | 1–0 | TKİ Tavşanlı Linyitspor | Tevfik Sırrı Gür Stadium, Mersin |
| Sunday, 16:30 | Veysel Kılıç 44' (F); Fatih Egedik (yellow card) 32'; Hüseyin Yoğurtçu (yellow card) 37'; Tuna Kaya (yellow card) 57'; Şehmus Özer (yellow card) 85' | Report | (yellow card) 30' Mehmet Akyüz; (yellow card) 53' Tanju Yavuz | Referee: Çağatay Şahan |

| 13 September 2010 Round 3 | Samsunspor | 1–1 | Mersin İdmanyurdu | 19 Mayıs Stadium, Samsun |
| Monday, 20:00 the game was put off at 40' continued on 3 Nov 2010; Wednesday, 19:00 | Simon Zenke 55'; Abdulaziz Solmaz (yellow card) 59' | Report | 24' (F) Şehmus Özer | Referee: Fethi Serkan Koçak |

| 19 September 2010 Round 4 | Mersin İdmanyurdu | 1–0 | Diyarbakırspor | Tevfik Sırrı Gür Stadium, Mersin |
| Sunday, 16:00 | Yunus Altun 57' (H); Hüseyin Yoğurtçu (yellow card) 29'; Fatih Egedik (yellow card) 35'; Al Bangura (yellow card) 81'; Şehmus Özer (yellow card) 83' | Report | (red card) 48' Önder Çengel | Referee: Hakan Ceylan |

| 26 September 2010 Round 5 | Karşıyaka | 0–0 | Mersin İdmanyurdu | Alsancak Stadium, İzmir |
| Sunday, 19:30 | Tolga Doğantez (yellow card) 16'; Aykut Akgün (yellow card) 70' (red card) | Report | (yellow card) 13' Mustafa Aydın; (yellow card) 17' Şehmus Özer; (yellow card) 88' Al Bangura | Referee: Mustafa İlker Coşkun |

| 3 October 2010 Round 6 | Mersin İdmanyurdu | 2–4 | Denizlispor | Tevfik Sırrı Gür Stadium, Mersin |
| Sunday, 15:00 | Fatih Egedik 32' (pen.); Vlad Bujor 37' (F); Kerem İnan (yellow card) 19'; Fatih Egedik (yellow card) 35'; Tuna Kaya (yellow card) 49' | Report | 19' (F) Souleymane Youla; 40' (F) Emin Aladağ; 71' (F) Souleymane Youla; 88' (F) Serdar Eyilik; (yellow card) 31' Yasin Çakmak; (yellow card) 36' Levent Kartop; (yellow card) 71' Ahmet Cebe; (yellow card) 77' Emin Aladağ; (yellow card) 87' Damien Chrysostome; (yellow card) 89' Douglas Daniel Braga | Referee: Mete Kalkavan |

| 10 October 2010 Round 7 | Kayseri Erciyesspor | 1–1 | Mersin İdmanyurdu | Kadir Has Stadium, Kayseri |
| Sunday, 15:00 | Severin Brice Bikoko 41' (H); Kemal Dulda (yellow card) 38' | Report | 36' (H) Yunus Altun; (yellow card) 28' Yunus Altun; (yellow card) 57' Şehmus Özer; (red card) 69' Mehmet Budak; (yellow card) 70' Fuat Onur | Referee: Murat Türker |

| 17 October 2010 Round 8 | Mersin İdmanyurdu | 1–4 | Orduspor | Tevfik Sırrı Gür Stadium, Mersin |
| Sunday, 14:00 | Şehmus Özer 27' (pen.); Joseph Boum (yellow card) 59' | Report | 48' (F) Bilal Türkgüler; 54' (F) Ali Çamdalı; 61' (pen.) Murat Akın; 89' (F) Bilal Türkgüler; (yellow card) 73' Müslüm Yelken | Referee: Hakan Özkan |

| 24 October 2010 Round 9 | Güngören Belediyespor | 0–0 | Mersin İdmanyurdu | Mimar Yahya Baş Stadium, Istanbul |
| Sunday, 14:00 | Seçkin Bektaş (yellow card) 42' | Report | (yellow card) 5' Joseph Boum; (yellow card) 7' Hasan Üçüncü; (yellow card) 60' Yunus Altun; (red card) 74' Ernani Pereira | Referee: Kutluhan Bilgiç |

| 31 October 2010 Round 10 | Mersin İdmanyurdu | 1–3 | Gaziantep BŞB | Tevfik Sırrı Gür Stadium, Mersin |
| Sunday, 14:00 | Yunus Altun 48' (F); Sertaç Şahin (yellow card) 37' (red card); Fuat Onur (yellow card) 41'; Fatih Egedik (yellow card) 59'; Nurullah Kaya (yellow card) 61' (red card); Mehmet Budak (yellow card) 73'; Tuna Kaya (yellow card) 83' | Report | 42' (F) Eren Özen; 46' (F) Abdullah Halman; 74' (pen.) Ramazan Altıntepe; (yellow card) 34' Kenan Aslanoğlu; (yellow card) 70' Ali Sakal | Referee: Zafer Demir |

| 6 November 2010 Round 11 | Çaykur Rizespor | 3–0 | Mersin İdmanyurdu | Yeni Şehir Stadium, Rize |
| Saturday, 14:00 | Mehmet Al 25' (pen.); Mehmet Al 84' (F); Çağrı Yarkın 90+3' (F); Mutlu Kızıltan (yellow card) 44'; İlyas Çakmak (yellow card) 54'; Ayman Abdelaziz (yellow card) 76' | Report | (yellow card) 54' Joseph Boum; (yellow card) 73' Fatih Egedik; (yellow card) 78' Erdal Güneş; (yellow card) 90' Yunus Altun | Referee: Mustafa İlker Coşkun |

| 14 November 2010 Round 12 | Mersin İdmanyurdu | 2–1 | Akhisar Belediyespor | Tevfik Sırrı Gür Stadium, Mersin |
| Sunday, 13:30 | Tuna Kaya 56'; Yunus Altun 78'; Fatih Şen (yellow card) 90' | Report | 71' Murat Gürbüzerol; (yellow card) 56' Hüseyin Yalçın; (yellow card) 59' Serkan Gaşi; (yellow card) 90' Mustafa Aşan | Attendance: 8000; Referee: Hüseyin Sabancı |

| 20 November 2010 Round 13 | Altay | 1–2 | Mersin İdmanyurdu | Alsancak Stadium, İzmir |
| Saturday, 14:00 | Mehmet Şen 78' (H); Mehmet Sak (yellow card) 75' | Report | 58' (F) Erdal Güneş; 90' (F) Yunus Altun; (yellow card) 41' Nezir Özer; (yellow card) 49' Tuna Kaya; (yellow card) 50' Hüseyin Yoğurtçu; (yellow card) 62' Hasan Üçüncü | Attendance: 2256; Referee: Özgüç Türkalp |

| 27 November 2010 Round 14 | Mersin İdmanyurdu | 1–0 | Giresunspor | Tevfik Sırrı Gür Stadium, Mersin |
| Saturday, 14:00 | Şehmus Özer 65' (F); Fatih Egedik (yellow card) 69'; Musa Kuş (yellow card) 83' | Report | | Referee: Deniz Çoban |

| 5 December 2010 Round 15 | Kartalspor | 0–1 | Mersin İdmanyurdu | Kartal Stadium, Istanbul |
| Sunday, 13:30 | Şadi Çolak (yellow card) 55'; Muhammed Türkmen (yellow card) 60'; Uğur Utlu (yellow card) 64'; Serkan Özsoy (yellow card) 66'; Erhan Şentürk (yellow card) 79'; Alper Bayülken (yellow card) 87' | Report | 32' (F) Şehmus Özer; (yellow card) 68' Erdal Güneş; (yellow card) 70' Yunus Altun | Referee: Mesut Çarık |

| 12 December 2010 Round 16 | Boluspor | 2–1 | Mersin İdmanyurdu | Bolu Atatürk Stadium, Bolu |
| Saturday, 14:00 | Erdem Özgenç 90+1' (F); Erdem Özgenç 90+7' (F); Landry Matondo (yellow card) 44'; Sefa Aksoy (yellow card) 47'; Erdem Özgenç (yellow card) 90'; Yaser Yıldız (yellow card) 90'; Oltan Karakullukçu (yellow card) 90' | Report | 80' (H) Veysel Kılıç; (yellow card) 44' Fuat Onur; (yellow card) 90' Kerem İnan | Referee: Volkan Bayarslan |

| 19 December 2010 Round 17 | Mersin İdmanyurdu | v | BYE |

Sources: 2010–11 Süper Lig pages.

=== Second half ===
Mersin İdmanyurdu (MİY) 2010–11 TFF First League season second half game reports is shown in the following table. Kick off times are in EET and EEST.

| 22 January 2011 Round 18 | Mersin İdmanyurdu | 0–0 | Adanaspor | Tevfik Sırrı Gür Stadium, Mersin |
| Saturday, 14:00 | Şehmus Özer (yellow card) 52'; İlhan Özbay (yellow card) 71'; Adem Büyük (yellow card) 89' | Report | (yellow card) 26' Anıl Karaer; (yellow card) 34' Koray Şanlı; (yellow card) 88' Talha Mayhoş; (yellow card) 89' Rahman Oğuz Kobya | Referee: Süleyman Abay |

| 30 January 2011 Round 19 | TKİ Tavşanlı Linyitspor | 0–0 | Mersin İdmanyurdu | Dumlupınar Stadium, Kütahya |
| Sunday, 13:30 | Cemil Adıcan (yellow card) 12'; Mehmet Akyüz (yellow card) 44' | Report | (yellow card) 29' Adem Büyük; (yellow card) 35' Hasan Üçüncü; (yellow card) 75' Mehmet Polat | Referee: Mete Kalkavan |

| 6 February 2011 Round 20 | Mersin İdmanyurdu | 1–0 | Samsunspor | Tevfik Sırrı Gür Stadium, Mersin |
| Sunday, 13:30 | Mehmet Polat 2' (H); Eren Şen (yellow card) 20'; Adem Büyük (yellow card) 55'; Hasan Üçüncü (yellow card) 68'; Fatih Şen (yellow card) 89' | Report | (yellow card) 16' Simon Zenke; (yellow card) 64' Ersin Veli | Referee: Mustafa İlker Coşkun |

| 13 February 2011 Round 21 | Diyarbakırspor | 0–2 | Mersin İdmanyurdu | Atatürk Stadium, Diyarbakır |
| Sunday, 13:30 | | Report | 5' (H) Adem Büyük; 85' (H) Adem Büyük; (yellow card) 26' Burak Karaduman; (yellow card) 34' Fatih Şen | Attendance: Closed doors Referee: Aytekin Durmaz |

| 20 February 2011 Round 22 | Mersin İdmanyurdu | 4–0 | Karşıyaka | Tevfik Sırrı Gür Stadium, Mersin |
| Sunday, 13:30 | Fatih Şen 34' (F); Fatih Şen 50' (pen.); Nduka Ozokwo 75' (F); Adem Büyük 83' (F); Burak Karaduman (yellow card) 24'; Erman Özgür (red card) 87' | Report | (yellow card) 61' Mustafa Ulaş Ortakaya; (yellow card) 69' Engin Aktürk; (yellow card) 87' Kıvanç Karakaş; (yellow card) 87' (red card) Ayhan Evren | Referee: Deniz Çoban |

| 27 February 2011 Round 23 | Denizlispor | 1–2 | Mersin İdmanyurdu | Atatürk Stadium, Denizli |
| Sunday, 19:30 | Ahmet Cebe 20' (F); Fatih Ceylan (yellow card) 57'; Levent Kartop (yellow card) 70'; Musa Nizam (yellow card) 85'; Ahmet Burak Solakel (yellow card) 89' | Report | 5' (F) Adem Büyük; 72' (F) Fatih Şen; (yellow card) 56' Nduka Ozokwo; (yellow card) 61' Joseph Boum; (yellow card) 87' Burak Karaduman | Referee: Hakan Özkan |

| 5 March 2011 Round 24 | Mersin İdmanyurdu | 1–2 | Kayseri Erciyesspor | Tevfik Sırrı Gür Stadium, Mersin |
| Saturday, 14:00 | Adem Büyük 55' (F); Hüseyin Yoğurtçu (yellow card) 70'; Tonia Tisdell (yellow card) 75' | Report | 44' (F) Kemal Okyay; 89' (o.g.) Hüseyin Yoğurtçu; (yellow card) 18' Veli Kızılkaya; (yellow card) 34' Emre Toraman; (yellow card) 83' Severin Bikoko; (yellow card) 89' Özgür Volkan Yıldırım | Referee: Hakan Ceylan |

| 13 March 2011 Round 25 | Orduspor | 0–1 | Mersin İdmanyurdu | 19 Eylül Stadium, Ordu |
| Sunday, 13:30 | | Report | 63' (F) Adem Büyük; (yellow card) 35' Burak Karaduman; (yellow card) 75' (red card) Hasan Üçüncü; (yellow card) 80' Joseph Boum | Referee: Mustafa Kamil Abitoğlu |

| 20 March 2011 Round 26 | Mersin İdmanyurdu | 1–0 | Güngören Belediyespor | Tevfik Sırrı Gür Stadium, Mersin |
| Sunday, 13:30 | Fatih Şen 73' (F) | Report | (yellow card) 15' Babacar Diallo | Referee: Mustafa İlker Coşkun |

| 27 March 2011 Round 27 | Gaziantep BŞB | 1–0 | Mersin İdmanyurdu | Kamil Ocak Stadium, Gaziantep |
| Sunday, 19:00 | Abdullah Halman 10' (F); Abdullah Halman (yellow card) 32'; Serdar Deliktaş (yellow card) 84'; Ali Sakal (yellow card) 91' | Report | (yellow card) 36' Hasan Üçüncü; (yellow card) 38' Mehmet Polat; (yellow card) 84' Joseph Boum; (yellow card) 86' Faruk Bayar | Referee: Özgüç Türkalp |

| 3 April 2011 Round 28 | Mersin İdmanyurdu | 3–0 | Çaykur Rizespor | Tevfik Sırrı Gür Stadium, Mersin |
| Sunday, 14:00 | Adem Büyük 14' (H); Adem Büyük 60' (F); Fatih Şen 68' (F); Fuat Onur (yellow card) 62'; Fatih Şen (yellow card) 69'; Şehmus Özer (yellow card) 85' | Report | (yellow card) 44' Mithat Yaşar; (yellow card) 56' Ramazan Kurşunlu; (yellow card) 73' Ersin Güreler; (yellow card) 82' Erkan Kaş | Attendance: 15.000; Referee: Hüseyin Göçek |

| 10 April 2011 Round 29 | Akhisar Belediyespor | 0–1 | Mersin İdmanyurdu | Belediye Stadium, Akhisar, Manisa |
| Sunday, 14:00 | Mustafa Aşan (yellow card) 70'; Gökhan Dinçer (yellow card) 88' | Report | 44' (F) Erman Özgür; (yellow card) 65' Nduka Ozokwo; (yellow card) 74' Faruk Bayar | Referee: Abdullah Yılmaz |

| 17 April 2011 Round 30 | Mersin İdmanyurdu | 2–3 | Altay | Tevfik Sırrı Gür Stadium, Mersin |
| Sunday, 14:00 | Nduka Ozokwo 25' (F); Erdal Güneş 42' (H); Fatih Şen (penalty missed) 18'; Şehmus Özer (yellow card) 28'; Faruk Bayar (yellow card) 49'; Fatih Egedik (yellow card) 78' | Report | 21' (F) Mehmet Şen; 67' (F) Murat Hacıoğlu; 79' (pen.) Murat Hacıoğlu | Attendance: 15.000; Referee: Bünyamin Gezer |

| 24 April 2011 Round 31 | Giresunspor | 1–2 | Mersin İdmanyurdu | Atatürk Stadium, Giresun |
| Sunday, 14:00 | Ferdi Başoda 86' (H); Mesut Çaytemel (yellow card) 30'; Ramazan Durdu (yellow card) 76' (red card) | Report | 28' (H) Tonia Tisdell; 85' (F) Adem Büyük; (yellow card) 85' Adem Büyük | Referee: Halis Özkahya |

| 30 April 2011 Round 32 | Mersin İdmanyurdu | 2–1 | Kartalspor | Tevfik Sırrı Gür Stadium, Mersin |
| Saturday, 14:00 | Mehmet Polat 19' (H); Şehmus Özer 80' (F); Tonia Tisdell (yellow card) 17'; Erdal Güneş (yellow card) 24'; Hasan Üçüncü (yellow card) 68' | Report | 68' (F) Oktay Demircan; (yellow card) 63' Hamza Gezmiş; (yellow card) 65' Mehmet Uslu; (yellow card) 78' Şadi Çolak | Attendance: 15.000; Referee: Kuddusi Müftüoğlu |

| 8 May 2011 Round 33 | Mersin İdmanyurdu | 2–0 | Boluspor | Tevfik Sırrı Gür Stadium, Mersin |
| Sunday, 14:00 | Adem Büyük 44' (F); Nduka Ozokwo 61' (F); İlhan Özbay (yellow card) 66' | Report | (yellow card) 27' Sefa Aksoy; (yellow card) 45' Özgür Bayer; (yellow card) 84' (red card) Cemil Vatansever; (yellow card) 88' Ramazan Sal | Attendance: 15.000; Referee: Fırat Aydınus |

| 15 May 2011 Round 34 | BYE | v | Mersin İdmanyurdu |
| Sunday, 14:00 |

Sources: 2010–11 Süper Lig pages.

== 2010–11 Turkish Cup participation ==
2009–10 Turkish Cup was played with 71 teams in three stages. The 49th Cup was played as Ziraat Türkiye Kupası for sponsorship reasons. In the first stage 2 elimination rounds and a play-off round were played in one-leg elimination system. In the second stage 20 remaining teams played one-led round-robin group games in 4 groups, 5 teams in each group. In the third stage; quarter- and semifinals and finals played again in one-leg elimination rule. Final game was played at a neutral venue. MİY attended to 49th Turkish Cup in 2010–11 Turkish Cup at second round. First round played among teams from TFF Second League and TFF Third League in 2009–2010 season. 2009–10 TFF First League teams started from round two. MİY was eliminated at play-offs by Beşiktaş who later became winners of the Cup for 9th time.

=== Cup track ===
The drawings and results Mersin İdmanyurdu (MİY) followed in 2010–11 Turkish Cup are shown in the following table.

| Round | Own League | Opponent's League | Opponent | A/H | Score | Result |
|---|---|---|---|---|---|---|
| Round 2 | First League | Third League | Torbalıspor | H | 3–2 | Promoted |
| Play-offs | First League | Süper Lig | Beşiktaş | A | 0–3 | Eliminated |

Note: In the above table 'Score' shows For and Against goals whether the match played at home or not.

=== Game details ===
Mersin İdmanyurdu (MİY) 2010–11 Turkish Cup game reports is shown in the following table. Kick off times are in EET and EEST.

| 22 September 2010 Round 2 | Mersin İdmanyurdu | 3–2 | Torbalıspor | Tevfik Sırrı Gür Stadium, Mersin |
| Wednesday, 15:00 | Ilgar Gurbanov 3' (F); Veysel Kılıç 54' (F); Nurullah Kaya 89' (F); Musa Kuş (yellow card) 82' | Report | 58' (F) Mümin Aysever; 67' (F) Mümin Aysever; (yellow card) 46' Mustafa Öner; (yellow card) 56' Onur Özcan | Referee: Volkan Çetinkaya |

| 28 October 2010 Play-offs | Beşiktaş | 3–0 (a.e.t.) | Mersin İdmanyurdu | Fiyapı İnönü Stadium, Istanbul |
| Thursday, 20:00 | Guti 100' (F); Bobô 102' (F); Bobô 112' (H); Necip Uysal (yellow card) 100' | Report | (yellow card) 65' Nurullah Kaya; (yellow card) 84' (red card) Hasan Üçüncü; (yellow card) 90' Eser Altın | Referee: Aytekin Durmaz |

Source: 2010–11 Ziraat Turkish Cup pages.

== Management ==
- Club address was: Hamidiye Mah., İsmet İnönü Blv., Sevim Çalışkan Apt. No: 3/3, Mersin.

=== Club management ===
- Executive committee: President : Ali Kahramanlı since September 2008. Vice-president: Senan İdin. Deputy vice-presidents: Ayhan Erdem, Beşir Acar, Şerafettin Kadooğlu. Football division manager: Mehmet Hanifi Işık. Treasurer: Nafiz Deniz. General Secretary: Ali Sönmez. Member in charge of infrastructure and club director: Salih Baysal. Members: Mehmet H. Serdaroğlu, Cahit Yürümez, Naif Yavuz, İbrahim Çakar, Hanifi Çelik.

Mersin İdmanyurdu Sports Club president and managerial board members are elected by general vote of club members. Last election was held in September 2008. Mersin İdmanyurdu football team has finished 2009–10 season in 13th place in TFF First League. The team was guaranteed non-relegation only at the last match of the season. Therefore, president Ali Kahramanlı declared an extraordinary general meeting, in order to provide support for the club. However, later he renounced that meeting will be held during the half-season due to lack of time to prepare team for next season.

=== Coaching team ===
- Before 17 October 2010: Head coach: Yüksel Yeşilova General manager: Serkan Damla. Trainer: Tekin İncebaldır. Goalkeeper trainer: Okan Kopan. Tactician: Dorel Chiriac. Analist : Mehmet Erben Arslan.
- After 20 October 2010: Head coach: Nurullah Sağlam Trainer: İsmet Savcılıoğlu. Goalkeeper trainer: Sadık Öztürk. General manager: Serkan Damla.

2010–11 Mersin İdmanyurdu head coaches

| Nat | Head coach | Period | Pl | W | D | L | Notes |
|---|---|---|---|---|---|---|---|
| (Turkey) | Yüksel Yeşilova | 03.06.2010 – 17.10.2010 | 9 | 3 | 4 | 2 | Resigned after 8th round. |
| (Turkey) | Nurullah Sağlam | 20.10.2010 – 06.07.2011 | 25 | 15 | 3 | 7 | Continued in the next season. |

Note: Only official games were included.

== 2010–11 squad ==
Appearances, goals and cards count for 2010–11 TFF First League and 2010–11 Turkish Cup games. Serial penalties were not included in goal stats. Kit numbers were allowed to select by players. 18 players appeared in each game roster, three to be replaced. Only the players who appeared in game rosters were included and listed in order of appearance.

| O | N | Nat | Name | Birth | Born | Pos | LA | LG | CA | CG | TA | TG | Booked | Sent off (straight red) | ← Season Notes → |
|---|---|---|---|---|---|---|---|---|---|---|---|---|---|---|---|
| 1 | 1 | (Turkey) | Kerem İnan (C) | 25 Mar 1980 | Istanbul | GK | 32 | | | | 32 | | 2 | | → previous season. |
| 2 | 38 | (Turkey) | Tuna Kaya | 3 Feb 1984 | Tomarza | DF | 14 | 1 | 1 | | 15 | 1 | 4 | | → previous season. |
| 3 | 89 | (Turkey) | Mustafa Aydın | 30 Apr 1986 | Bakırköy | DF | 4 | | | | 4 | | 3 | | 2010 SL MKE Ankaragücü. |
| 4 | 33 | (Turkey) | Fuat Onur | 20 Jan 1987 | Altınözü | MF | 15 | | 1 | | 16 | | 4 | | → previous season. |
| 5 | 16 | (Turkey) | Hüseyin Yoğurtçu | 30 Jun 1983 | Bursa | DF | 22 | | 2 | | 24 | | 4 | | 2010 ST Boluspor. |
| 6 | 6 | (Turkey) | Musa Kuş | 20 Feb 1978 | Kars | DF | 9 | | 1 | | 10 | | 4 | | 2010 ST Orduspor. |
| 7 | 11 | (Azerbaijan) | Ilgar Gurbanov | 25 Apr 1986 | Baku | MF | 7 | | 1 | 1 | 8 | 1 | | | 2010 ST Olimpik Baku. |
| 8 | 20 | (Sierra Leone) | Al Bangura | 24 Jan 1988 | Port Loko | MF | 6 | | | | 6 | | 3 | | 2010 ST FC Blackpool. |
| 9 | 5 | (Turkey) | Fatih Egedik | 2 May 1982 | Karşıyaka | MF | 25 | 1 | 1 | | 26 | 1 | 7 | | → previous season. |
| 10 | 39 | (Turkey) | Şehmus Özer | 10 May 1980 | Ergani | FW | 27 | 5 | 1 | | 28 | 5 | 8 | | 2010 ST Altay. |
| 11 | 9 | (Turkey) | Tunç Behram | 21 Jul 1990 | Mersin | FW | 3 | | 1 | | 4 | | | | → previous season. |
| 12 | 82 | (Turkey) | Eser Altın | 6 Oct 1980 | Ankara | GK | | | 2 | | 2 | | 1 | | 2010 ST Dardanelspor. |
| 13 | 8 | (Turkey) | Nurullah Kaya | 20 Jul 1986 | Batman | FW | 19 | | 2 | 1 | 21 | 1 | 1 | 1 | → previous season. |
| 14 | 7 | (Turkey) | Veysel Kılıç | 7 Sep 1987 | Seyhan | FW | 10 | 2 | 1 | 1 | 11 | 3 | | | → previous season. |
| 15 | 26 | (Azerbaijan) | Ernani Pereira | 22 Jan 1978 | Belô | DF | 17 | | 1 | | 18 | | | 1 | 2010 ST Karvan FK. |
| 16 | 34 | (Turkey) | Yunus Altun | 25 Aug 1977 | Eyüp | FW | 15 | | 1 | | 16 | | 1 | | 2010 ST Bucaspor. |
| 17 | 62 | (Turkey) | Sertaç Şahin | 23 Jul 1983 | İnebolu | MF | 5 | | 2 | | 7 | | | 1 | → previous season. |
| 18 | 15 | (Turkey) | Hasan Üçüncü | 16 Nov 1980 | Sürmene | MF | 22 | | 1 | | 23 | | 6 | 2 | 2010 ST Çaykur Rizespor. |
| 19 | 14 | (Turkey) | Erdal Güneş | 29 Mar 1982 | Eruh | FW | 27 | 2 | 1 | | 28 | 2 | 3 | | 2010 ST Diyarbakırspor. |
| 20 | 10 | (Turkey) | Fatih Şen | 10 Aug 1979 | Bafra | FW | 22 | 5 | 1 | | 23 | 5 | 4 | | → previous season. |
| 21 | 3 | (Cameroon) | Joseph Boum | 26 Sep 1989 | Yaoundé | DF | 23 | | 1 | | 24 | | 6 | | → previous season. |
| 22 | 21 | (Turkey) | Mehmet Budak | 1 Aug 1980 | Doğanşehir | DF | 10 | | 2 | | 12 | | 1 | 1 | 2010 ST Altay. |
| 23 | 23 | (Romania) | Vlad Bujor | 3 Feb 1989 | Satu Mare | FW | 6 | 1 | 2 | | 8 | 1 | | | 2010 ST CFR Cluj. |
| 24 | 91 | (Turkey) | Nezir Özer | 10 May 1991 | Ergani | FW | 3 | | 1 | | 4 | | 1 | | 2010 ST Pazarspor. |
| 25 | 55 | (Liechtenstein) | Cengiz Biçer | 11 Dec 1987 | Grabs | GK | | | | | | | | | 2010 ST Samsunspor. |
| 26 | 4 | (Germany) | Seyhan Çetinkaya | 25 Jan 1987 | Herne | MF | | | | | | | | | 2010 ST Rot-Weiss Essen. |
| 27 | 13 | (Turkey) | Vedat Çoban | 8 Sep 1984 | Tatvan | DF | | | | | | | | | → previous season. |
| 28 | 17 | (Turkey) | Faruk Atalay | 18 Mar 1981 | Of | MF | 1 | | 1 | | 2 | | | | → previous season. |
| 29 | 19 | (Turkey) | Birol Parlak | 1 Mar 1990 | Pazar | MF | | | | | | | | | → previous season. |
| 30 | 2 | (Turkey) | Erman Özgür | 13 Apr 1977 | Kartal | MF | 12 | 1 | | | 12 | 1 | | 1 | 2011 WT Gaziantepspor |
| 31 | 25 | (Turkey) | Burak Karaduman | 23 Feb 1985 | Ankara | MF | 8 | | | | 8 | | 4 | | 2011 WT Konyaspor. |
| 32 | 27 | (Turkey) | Mehmet Polat | 8 Jun 1978 | Gaziantep | DF | 16 | 2 | | | 16 | 2 | 2 | | 2011 WT Bucaspor. |
| 33 | 66 | (Turkey) | İlhan Özbay | 19 Sep 1982 | Şefaatli | MF | 16 | | | | 16 | | 2 | | 2011 WT Sakaryaspor. |
| 34 | 99 | (Turkey) | Adem Büyük | 30 Aug 1987 | Hopa | FW | 14 | 10 | | | 14 | 10 | 4 | | 2011 WL Manisaspor. |
| 35 | 28 | (Germany) | Eren Şen | 23 Feb 1985 | Hamburg | FW | 5 | | | | 5 | | 1 | | 2011 WT 1. FC Magdeburg. |
| 36 | 77 | (Nigeria) | Nduka Ozokwo | 25 Dec 1988 | Enugu | MF | 15 | 3 | | | 15 | 3 | 2 | | 2011 WT Enugu Rangers. |
| 37 | 18 | (Liberia) | Tonia Tisdell | 20 Mar 1992 | Liberia | MF | 11 | 1 | | | 11 | 1 | 2 | | 2011 WL MKE Ankaragücü. |
| 38 | 29 | (Turkey) | Faruk Bayar | 11 Oct 1981 | Eskişehir | MF | 7 | | | | 7 | | 3 | | 2011 WT Sivasspor. |

Sources: TFF club page and maçkolik team page.

== A2 team ==
A2 League was played in two groups, one with 20 teams and the second with 17 teams (originally second group was planned to be consisting of 18 teams, but after dismissal of Ankaraspor group was played by 17 teams). Süper Lig, Bank Asya First league and two TFF Second League teams which meet the conditions participated. Mersin İdmanyurdu took place in Group B.

League position

| Overall | | | | | | | | Home | | | | | | Away | | | | | |
| Pld | W | D | L | GF | GA | GD | Pts | W | D | L | GF | GA | GD | W | D | L | GF | GA | GD |
|---|---|---|---|---|---|---|---|---|---|---|---|---|---|---|---|---|---|---|---|
| 32 | 8 | 12 | 12 | 26 | 32 | −6 | 36 | 3 | 9 | 4 | 13 | 16 | −3 | 5 | 3 | 8 | 13 | 16 | −3 |

Last updated: 17:30, 14 May 2011 (UTC).
Source: TFF A2 League page

Results by round

| Round | 1 | 2 | 3 | 4 | 5 | 6 | 7 | 8 | 9 | 10 | 11 | 12 | 13 | 14 | 15 | 16 | 17 | 18 | 19 | 20 | 21 | 22 | 23 | 24 | 25 | 26 | 27 | 28 | 29 | 30 | 31 | 32 | 33 | 34 |
|---|---|---|---|---|---|---|---|---|---|---|---|---|---|---|---|---|---|---|---|---|---|---|---|---|---|---|---|---|---|---|---|---|---|---|
| Ground | A | H | A | H | A | H | B | A | H | A | H | A | H | A | H | A | H | H | A | H | A | H | A | B | H | A | H | A | H | A | H | A | H | A |
| Result | L | W | L | D | L | W | | L | L | L | L | D | L | W | D | D | D | D | L | L | W | D | D | | D | W | D | W | D | W | W | L | D | L |
| Position | 13 | 5 | 11 | 9 | 13 | 8 | 12 | 13 | 14 | 15 | 15 | 15 | 15 | 14 | 14 | 14 | 14 | 14 | 14 | 14 | 14 | 14 | 14 | 14 | 14 | 13 | 13 | 13 | 13 | 13 | 12 | 12 | 12 | 13 |

Updated to match(es) played on 14 May 2011. Source: TFF A2 League page
A = Away; H = Home; B = Bye; W = Win; D = Draw; L = Loss

== See also ==
- Football in Turkey
- 2010–11 TFF First League
- 2010–11 Turkish Cup
