= 2008–09 Beşiktaş J.K. season =

Beşiktaş J.K.
2008–09 season
- President: Yıldırım Demirören
- Head coach: Mustafa Denizli
- Stadium: BJK İnönü Stadium
- Süper Lig: 1st (13th title)
- Turkish Cup: Winners (8th title)
- UEFA Cup: First round
- Top goalscorer: League: Bobô (12 goals); All: Bobô (20 goals)
Home colours	Away colours	Third colours

The 2008–09 season was Beşiktaş' 105th football season. Also it was the 50th year of the Süper Lig. Beşiktaş won the domestic double of the league title and cup.

== Players ==
=== First-team squad ===
Note: Flags indicate national team as defined under FIFA eligibility rules; some limited exceptions apply. Players may hold more than one non-FIFA nationality.

No.	Pos.	Nation	Player
1	GK	(Turkey) TUR	Rüştü Reçber
2	DF	(Turkey) TUR	Serdar Kurtuluş
4	MF	(France) FRA	Édouard Cissé
5	DF	(Turkey) TUR	Gökhan Zan
6	DF	(Czech Republic) CZE	Tomáš Sivok
7	DF	(Croatia) CRO	Anthony Šerić **
8	MF	(Turkey) TUR	Uğur İnceman *
10	MF	(Argentina) ARG	Matías Delgado (captain)
11	FW	(Brazil) BRA	Mert Nobre (vice-captain)
13	FW	(Brazil) BRA	Bobô
14	MF	(Chile) CHI	Rodrigo Tello
15	MF	(Turkey) TUR	Necip Uysal
17	MF	(Turkey) TUR	Ekrem Dağ *

No.	Pos.	Nation	Player
19	DF	(Turkey) TUR	İbrahim Üzülmez
20	MF	(Turkey) TUR	Aydın Karabulut *
21	MF	(Turkey) TUR	Serdar Özkan
22	MF	(Turkey) TUR	Ali Tandoğan
23	FW	(Slovakia) SVK	Filip Hološko
25	GK	(Turkey) TUR	Erdem Köse
26	DF	(Czech Republic) CZE	Tomáš Zápotočný
35	DF	(Turkey) TUR	Tuna Üzümcü
58	DF	(Turkey) TUR	İbrahim Toraman
78	GK	(Turkey) TUR	Korcan Çelikay
84	GK	(Turkey) TUR	Hakan Arıkan
99	FW	(Turkey) TUR	Batuhan Karadeniz

* Also holds (Germany) German citizenship. ** Also holds (Australia) Australian citizenship.

== Transfers ==
=== Transfers in ===
Note: Flags indicate national team as defined under FIFA eligibility rules; some limited exceptions apply. Players may hold more than one non-FIFA nationality.

No.	Pos.	Nation	Player
—	DF	(Czech Republic) CZE	Tomáš Zápotočný (from Udinese)
—	DF	(Czech Republic) CZE	Tomáš Sivok (from Udinese)
—	MF	(Turkey) TUR	Ekrem Dağ (from Gaziantepspor)
—	DF	(Turkey) TUR	Tuna Üzümcü (from Gençlerbirliği)

No.	Pos.	Nation	Player
—	DF	(Croatia) CRO	Anthony Šerić (from Panathinaikos)
—	MF	(Turkey) TUR	Uğur Inceman (from Manisaspor)
—	FW	(Turkey) TUR	Mert Safa Yılmaz (from Boluspor)

==== Transfers out ====
Note: Flags indicate national team as defined under FIFA eligibility rules; some limited exceptions apply. Players may hold more than one non-FIFA nationality.

No.	Pos.	Nation	Player
—	DF	(Turkey) TUR	Baki Mercimek (to Ankaraspor)
—	FW	(Turkey) TUR	Adem Büyük (to Manisaspor)
—	MF	(Turkey) TUR	Fahri Tatan (to Konyaspor)
—	MF	(Turkey) TUR	Ergun Aydın (to Diyarbakırspor)

No.	Pos.	Nation	Player
—	MF	(Turkey) TUR	Mehmet Yozgatlı (to Gaziantepspor)
—	GK	(Turkey) TUR	Murat Şahin (to Gaziantepspor)
—	MF	(Turkey) TUR	Mustafa Aşan (to Manisaspor)
—	FW	(Turkey) TUR	Rıza Burak Kahriman (to Yalovaspor)

==== Loans out ====
Note: Flags indicate national team as defined under FIFA eligibility rules; some limited exceptions apply. Players may hold more than one non-FIFA nationality.

No.	Pos.	Nation	Player
—	MF	(Turkey) TUR	Abdullah Eryılmaz (on loan to Akçaabat Sebatspor)
—	MF	(Turkey) TUR	Burak Tahir Ateş (on loan to Gaziosmanpaşaspor)
—	DF	(Turkey) TUR	Bülent Uzun (on loan to Kasımpaşa)
—	FW	(Turkey) TUR	Can Erdem (on loan to Altay)
—	FW	(Turkey) TUR	Can Gümrükcü (on loan to İnegölspor)
—	MF	(Turkey) TUR	Emirhan Satar (on loan to Fatih Karagümrük)
—	DF	(Turkey) TUR	Emre İncemollaoğlu (on loan to Giresunspor)
—	MF	(Turkey) TUR	Erdem Özkurt (on loan to Sarıyer)
—	DF	(Turkey) TUR	Erkan Reşmen (on loan to Çorumspor)
—	DF	(Turkey) TUR	Ethem Yılmaz (on loan to Gaziosmanpaşaspor)
—	FW	(Turkey) TUR	Gökhan Aydaş (on loan to Akçaabat Sebatspor)

No.	Pos.	Nation	Player
—	FW	(Turkey) TUR	Kenan Özer (on loan to Kayseri Erciyesspor)
—	DF	(Turkey) TUR	Koray Şanlı (on loan to Akçaabat Sebatspor)
—	DF	(Turkey) TUR	Mehmet Sedef (on loan to Altay)
—	MF	(Turkey) TUR	Metin Erdem (on loan to Elazığspor)
—	FW	(Turkey) TUR	Nail Tilbaç (on loan to Erzincanspor)
—	DF	(Turkey) TUR	Özgür Özkaya (on loan to Fatih Karagümrük)
—	GK	(Turkey) TUR	Rasim Mutlu (on loan to Elazığspor)
—	MF	(Turkey) TUR	Rıza Şen (on loan to Kasımpaşa)
—	MF	(Turkey) TUR	Serkan Çelik (on loan to Akçaabat Sebatspor)
—	DF	(Turkey) TUR	Sezer Sezgin (on loan to Boluspor)
—	MF	(Turkey) TUR	Soner Ergençay (on loan to Bozüyükspor)
—	DF	(Turkey) TUR	Zafer Doğan (on loan to Lüleburgazspor)

== Süper Lig ==
=== Results by round ===
Round	1	2	3	4	5	6	7	8	9	10	11	12	13	14	15	16	17	18	19	20	21	22	23	24	25	26	27	28	29	30	31	32	33	34
Ground	A	H	A	H	A	H	A	H	A	H	A	H	A	H	H	A	H	H	A	H	A	H	A	H	A	H	A	H	A	H	A	A	H	A
Result	W	W	D	W	D	W	W	D	L	W	D	W	L	L	W	L	W	W	D	D	W	W	W	W	D	W	W	D	W	L	W	W	W	W
Position	3	1	2	1	4	3	1	1	4	3	2	2	2	6	6	6	6	5	4	5	3	3	2	2	2	2	2	2	2	2	1	1	1	1

Updated to match(es) played on 2009-12-24. Source: tff.org
A = Away; H = Home; W = Win; D = Draw; L = Loss

=== First Half ===
August 24, 2008	Antalyaspor (Turkey)	2–3	(Turkey) Beşiktaş	Antalya, Turkey
				Stadium: Antalya Atatürk Stadium

September 1, 2008	Beşiktaş (Turkey)	2–0	(Turkey) Konyaspor	Istanbul, Turkey
				Stadium: BJK İnönü Stadium

September 14, 2008	Trabzonspor (Turkey)	0–0	(Turkey) Beşiktaş	Trabzon, Turkey
				Stadium: Hüseyin Avni Aker Stadium

September 21, 2008	Beşiktaş (Turkey)	3–0	(Turkey) Gaziantepspor	Istanbul, Turkey
				Stadium: BJK İnönü Stadium

September 27, 2008	İstanbul BB (Turkey)	1–1	(Turkey) Beşiktaş	Istanbul, Turkey
				Stadium: Atatürk Olympic Stadium

October 6, 2008	Beşiktaş (Turkey)	2–1	(Turkey) Hacettepe	Istanbul, Turkey
				Stadium: BJK İnönü Stadium

October 19, 2008	Gençlerbirliği (Turkey)	1–3	(Turkey) Beşiktaş	Ankara, Turkey
				Stadium: Ankara 19 Mayıs Stadium

October 24, 2008	Beşiktaş (Turkey)	1–1	(Turkey) Sivasspor	Istanbul, Turkey
				Stadium: BJK İnönü Stadium

November 2, 2008	Kayserispor (Turkey)	1–0	(Turkey) Beşiktaş	Kayseri, Turkey
				Stadium: Kayseri Atatürk Stadium

November 7, 2008	Beşiktaş (Turkey)	5–2	(Turkey) Kocaelispor	Istanbul, Turkey
				Stadium: BJK İnönü Stadium

November 16, 2008	Bursaspor (Turkey)	0–0	(Turkey) Beşiktaş	Bursa, Turkey
				Stadium: Bursa Atatürk Stadium

November 23, 2008	Beşiktaş (Turkey)	2–0	(Turkey) Eskişehirspor	Istanbul, Turkey
				Stadium: BJK İnönü Stadium

November 29, 2008	Fenerbahçe (Turkey)	2–1	(Turkey) Beşiktaş	Istanbul, Turkey
				Stadium: Şükrü Saracoğlu Stadium

December 6, 2008	Beşiktaş (Turkey)	1–3	(Turkey) Ankaraspor	Istanbul, Turkey
				Stadium: BJK İnönü Stadium

December 13, 2008	Beşiktaş (Turkey)	1–0	(Turkey) MKE Ankaragücü	Istanbul, Turkey
				Stadium: BJK İnönü Stadium

December 21, 2008	Galatasaray (Turkey)	4–2	(Turkey) Beşiktaş	Istanbul, Turkey
				Stadium: Ali Sami Yen Stadium

January 24, 2009	Beşiktaş (Turkey)	1–0	(Turkey) Denizlispor	Istanbul, Turkey
				Stadium: BJK İnönü Stadium

=== Second half ===
February 1, 2009	Beşiktaş (Turkey)	1–0	(Turkey) Antalyaspor	Istanbul, Turkey
				Stadium: BJK İnönü Stadium

February 8, 2009	Konyaspor (Turkey)	0–0	(Turkey) Beşiktaş	Konya, Turkey
				Stadium: Konya Atatürk Stadium

February 15, 2009	Beşiktaş (Turkey)	1–1	(Turkey) Trabzonspor	Istanbul, Turkey
				Stadium: BJK İnönü Stadium

February 20, 2009	Gaziantepspor (Turkey)	0–3	(Turkey) Beşiktaş	Gaziantep, Turkey
				Stadium: Kamil Ocak Stadium

February 27, 2009	Beşiktaş (Turkey)	2–1	(Turkey) İstanbul BB	Istanbul, Turkey
				Stadium: BJK İnönü Stadium

March 7, 2009	Hacettepe (Turkey)	2–3	(Turkey) Beşiktaş	Ankara, Turkey
				Stadium: Ankara 19 Mayıs Stadium

March 14, 2009	Beşiktaş (Turkey)	3–0	(Turkey) Gençlerbirliği	Istanbul, Turkey
				Stadium: BJK İnönü Stadium

March 21, 2009	Sivasspor (Turkey)	1–1	(Turkey) Beşiktaş	Sivas, Turkey
				Stadium: Sivas 4 Eylül Stadium

April 4, 2009	Beşiktaş (Turkey)	1–0	(Turkey) Kayserispor	Istanbul, Turkey
				Stadium: BJK İnönü Stadium

April 7, 2009	Kocaelispor (Turkey)	1–3	(Turkey) Beşiktaş	Kocaeli, Turkey
				Stadium: Kocaeli İsmetpaşa Stadium

April 19, 2009	Beşiktaş (Turkey)	0–0	(Turkey) Bursaspor	Istanbul, Turkey
				Stadium: BJK İnönü Stadium

April 26, 2009	Eskişehirspor (Turkey)	0–2	(Turkey) Beşiktaş	Eskişehir, Turkey
				Stadium: Eskişehir Atatürk Stadium

May 3, 2009	Beşiktaş (Turkey)	1–2	(Turkey) Fenerbahçe	Istanbul, Turkey
				Stadium: BJK İnönü Stadium

May 9, 2009	Ankaraspor (Turkey)	1–4	(Turkey) Beşiktaş	Ankara, Turkey
				Stadium: Yenikent AŞAŞ Stadium

May 17, 2009	MKE Ankaragücü (Turkey)	1–3	(Turkey) Beşiktaş	Ankara, Turkey
				Stadium: Ankara 19 Mayıs Stadium

May 24, 2009	Beşiktaş (Turkey)	2–1	(Turkey) Galatasaray	Istanbul, Turkey
				Stadium: BJK İnönü Stadium

May 30, 2009	Denizlispor (Turkey)	1–2	(Turkey) Beşiktaş	Denizli, Turkey
				Stadium: Denizli Atatürk Stadium

=== Standings ===
Pos	Team	Pld	W	D	L	GF	GA	GD	Pts	Qualification or relegation
1	Beşiktaş (C)	34	21	8	5	60	30	+30	71	Qualification to Champions League group stage
2	Sivasspor	34	19	9	6	54	28	+26	66	Qualification to Champions League third qualifying round
3	Trabzonspor	34	19	8	7	54	34	+20	65	Qualification to Europa League play-off round
4	Fenerbahçe	34	18	7	9	60	36	+24	61	Qualification to Europa League third qualifying round
5	Galatasaray	34	18	7	9	57	39	+18	61	Qualification to Europa League second qualifying round (Note: 2008–09 Turkish Cup was won by Champions League-qualified side Beşiktaş. Since cup runners-up Fenerbahçe secured a place in the European competitions via league position, the spot allocation for the 2009–10 UEFA Europa League effectively reverted to league positions.)

Rules for classification: 1st points; 2nd head-to-head points; 3rd head-to-head goal difference; 4th head-to-head goals scored; 5th head-to-head away goals scored; 6th goal difference; 7th goals scored
(C) Champions

== Turkish Cup ==
After finishing in the top four of the previous season's Süper Lig, Beşiktaş qualified for the group stages. Beşiktaş was placed in Group A, along with Antalyaspor, Gaziantepspor, Trabzonspor and Gaziantep B.B. Beşiktaş finished first.

=== Group stage ===
Pos	Team	Pld	W	D	L	GF	GA	GD	Pts
1	Beşiktaş	4	4	0	0	9	2	+7	12
2	Antalyaspor	4	2	1	1	8	6	+2	7
3	Gaziantepspor	4	2	0	2	6	5	+1	6
4	Trabzonspor	4	1	1	2	6	8	−2	4
5	Gaziantep BB	4	0	0	4	2	10	−8	0

Source: tff.org (in Turkish)
Rules for classification: 1) points; 2) goal difference; 3) number of goals scored.

October 30, 2008	Beşiktaş (Turkey)	3–0	(Turkey) Antalyaspor	Istanbul, Turkey
	Cissé 72'; Hološko 75'; Tello 77'	Report		Stadium: BJK İnönü Stadium; Referee: Özgür Türkalp

November 11, 2008	Trabzonspor (Turkey)	1–2	(Turkey) Beşiktaş	Trabzon, Turkey
	Korkmaz 54'	Report	Bobô 32'; Zápotočný 89'	Stadium: Hüseyin Avni Aker Stadium; Referee: Bünyamin Gezer

December 6, 2008	Beşiktaş (Turkey)	3–1	(Turkey) Gaziantep BB	Istanbul, Turkey
	Özkan 16'; Bobô 27'; Mert Nobre 68'	Report	Aksu 14'	Stadium: BJK İnönü Stadium; Referee: Aytekin Durmaz

December 10, 2008	Gaziantepspor (Turkey)	0–1	(Turkey) Beşiktaş	Gaziantep, Turkey
		Report	Mert Nobre 73'	Stadium: Kamil Ocak Stadium; Referee: Koray Gençerler

=== Quarter-finals ===
January 28, 2009	Antalyaspor (Turkey)	0–2	(Turkey) Beşiktaş	Antalya, Turkey
		Report	Bobô 18', 62'	Stadium: Antalya Atatürk Stadium; Referee: Deniz Çoban

February 4, 2009	Beşiktaş (Turkey)	3–1	(Turkey) Antalyaspor	Istanbul, Turkey
	Bobô 3'; Üzülmez 15'; Özkan 36'	Report	Kuru 18'	Stadium: BJK İnönü Stadium; Referee: Bülent Yıldırım

Beşiktaş won 5-1 on aggregate

=== Semi-finals ===
March 3, 2009	Ankaraspor (Turkey)	1–3	(Turkey) Beşiktaş	Ankara, Turkey
	Kısa 25'	Report	Delgado 42'; Hološko 77'; Şimşek 88'	Stadium: Yenikent ASAŞ Stadium; Referee: Selçuk Dereli

April 22, 2009	Beşiktaş (Turkey)	1–2	(Turkey) Ankaraspor	Istanbul, Turkey
	Hološko 35'	Report	Méyé 22'; Barış 80'	Stadium: BJK İnönü Stadium; Referee: Hüseyin Göçek

Beşiktaş won 4-3 on aggregate

=== Final ===
May 13, 2009	Beşiktaş (Turkey)	4–2	(Turkey) Fenerbahçe	İzmir, Turkey
	Şimşek 6'; Bobô 57', 75'; Hološko 80'	Report	Güiza 27'; Alex 89' (pen.)	Stadium: İzmir Atatürk Stadium; Referee: Bünyamin Gezer

== UEFA Cup ==
After finishing third in the previous season's Süper Lig, Beşiktaş qualified for the 2008–09 UEFA Cup, but was eliminated in the first round.

=== Second qualifying round ===
August 14, 2008	Široki Brijeg (Bosnia and Herzegovina)	1–2	(Turkey) Beşiktaş	Široki Brijeg, Bosnia and Herzegovina
	Šilić 90+1'		Delgado 19'; Mert Nobre 83'	Stadium: Pecara Stadium; Referee: Cesar Muniz Fernandez

August 28, 2008	Beşiktaş (Turkey)	4–0	(Bosnia and Herzegovina) Široki Brijeg	Istanbul, Turkey
	İnceman 14'; Özkan 49'; Bobô 58'; Tello 85'			Stadium: BJK İnönü Stadium; Referee: René Rogalla

Beşiktaş won 6-1 on aggregate

=== First round ===
September 18, 2008	Beşiktaş (Turkey)	1–0	(Ukraine) Metalist Kharkiv	Istanbul, Turkey
	Hološko 51'			Stadium: BJK İnönü Stadium; Referee: Martin Ingvarsson

October 2, 2008	Metalist Kharkiv (Ukraine)	4–1	(Turkey) Beşiktaş	Kharkiv, Ukraine
	Jajá 20', 70'; Dević 30'; Gancarczyk 79'		Mert Nobre 90'	Stadium: Metalist Stadium; Referee: Grzegorz Gilewskin

Beşiktaş lost 2–4 on aggregate
