= 2009 Turkish Cup final =

- Event: 2008–09 Turkish Cup
Beşiktaş	Fenerbahçe
4	2
- Date: 13 May 2009
- Venue: İzmir Atatürk Stadium, İzmir
- Man of the Match: Bobô (Beşiktaş)
- Referee: Bünyamin Gezer (Turkey)
- Weather: Sunny

The 2009 Turkish Cup final was played between Beşiktaş, and Fenerbahçe on 13 May 2009 in İzmir. Beşiktaş won 4–2.

== Beşiktaş J.K. ==
Beşiktaş was put in group A, along with Antalyaspor, Gaziantepspor, Trabzonspor and Gaziantep BB. Beşiktaş won all 4 group matches and proceeded to the quarter-finals against Antalyaspor. Beşiktaş won at away 2–0 and at home 3–1. In the semi-finals, Beşiktaş beat Ankaraspor 3–1 away and lost 2–1 at home, putting Beşiktaş in their 13th Turkish Cup final.

== Fenerbahçe S.K. ==
Fenerbahçe was put in Group C with Bursaspor, Eskişehirspor, Ankaragücü and Tokatspor. Fenerbahçe won all 4 group matches to put them in the quarter-finals. Fenerbahçe beat Bursaspor 1–0 away and 3–1 at home. In the semi-finals, Fenerbahçe beat Sivasspor 3–1 at home and a 0–0 tie away.

== Final ==
Yusuf Şimşek put Beşiktaş in the lead with an early goal against Fenerbahçe (1–0). Both teams missed scoring chances until the 26th minute, when Daniel Güiza scored the equalizer (1–1). Bobô scored Beşiktaş' second goal in the 56th minute (2–1), then scored another in the 73rd minute (3–1). Filip Hološko delivered the final blow with a goal in the 80th minute (4–1). A goal scored by Alex on a penalty kick made the score 4–2 in the 90th minute. Beşiktaş won their eighth Turkish Cup, their third in four years.

== Match details ==
13 May 2009
20:00

Fenerbahçe	2 - 4	Beşiktaş
Güiza 27'; Alex 90+1' (pen.)	Rapor	6' Yusuf; 56', 74' Bobô; 80' Hološko

İzmir Atatürk Stadyumu, İzmir
Referee: Bünyamin Gezer

Fenerbahçe
Beşiktaş

FENERBAHÇE:
GK	88	(Turkey) Volkan Babacan
CB	2	(Uruguay) Diego Lugano	(yellow card) 12'
CB	18	(Turkey) Ali Bilgin
RB	77	(Turkey) Gökhan Gönül
LB	3	(Brazil) Roberto Carlos
DM	5	(Turkey) Emre Belözoğlu		(substituted off) 65'
DM	21	(Turkey) Selçuk Şahin
RM	99	(Brazil) Deivid
LM	25	(Turkey) Uğur Boral		(substituted off) 49'
AM	10	(Brazil) Alex (C)
CF	14	(Spain) Daniel Güiza
Substitutes:
GK	1	(Turkey) Volkan Demirel
DF	6	(Turkey) Gökçek Vederson
DF	19	(Turkey) Önder Turacı
DF	24	(Turkey) Deniz Barış		(substituted on) 65'
MF	33	(Chile) Claudio Maldonado
FW	23	(Turkey) Semih Şentürk	(yellow card) 85'	(substituted on) 49'
FW	8	(Turkey) Colin Kazım-Richards
Manager:
(Spain) Luis Aragonés

BEŞİKTAŞ:
GK	84	(Turkey) Hakan Arıkan
CB	5	(Turkey) Gökhan Zan
CB	6	(Czech Republic) Tomáš Sivok	(yellow card) 33'
RB	17	(Austria) Ekrem Dağ
LB	58	(Turkey) İbrahim Toraman (C)	(yellow card) 20'	(substituted off) 46'
DM	28	(Germany) Fabian Ernst	(yellow card) 38'	(substituted off) 68'
DM	4	(France) Édouard Cissé
RM	23	(Slovakia) Filip Hološko
LM	20	(Chile) Rodrigo Tello
AM	29	(Turkey) Yusuf Şimşek		(substituted off) 75'
CF	13	(Brazil) Bobô		(substituted off) 80'
Substitutes:
GK	1	(Turkey) Rüştü Reçber
DF	19	(Turkey) İbrahim Üzülmez		(substituted on) 46'
DF	26	(Czech Republic) Tomáš Zápotočný
MF	8	(Turkey) Uğur İnceman		(substituted on) 75'
MF	9	(Turkey) Erkan Zengin
MF	21	(Turkey) Serdar Özkan
FW	11	(Turkey) Mert Nobre		(substituted on) 80'
Manager:
(Turkey) Mustafa Denizli

Man of the match:
Bobô (Beşiktaş)
Referee:
(Turkey) Bünyamin Gezer
Assistant referees:
(Turkey) Tarık Ongun
(Turkey) Asım Yusuf Öz
Fourth referee:
(Turkey) Mustafa Kamil Abitoğlu

== See also ==
- Turkish Super Cup 2009
- Turkish Cup
