= Bayar =

Bayar may refer to:

== People ==
- Buren Bayaer (1960–2018), a Chinese Mongol singer, composer, and disc jockey
- Celâl Bayar (1883–1986), a Turkish politician, statesman and the third President of Turkey
- Faruk Bayar (born 1981), a Turkish footballer
- Sanjaagiin Bayar (born 1956), a Mongolian politician and former Prime Minister of Mongolia
- Yesui Bayar (born 2000), a Mongolian swimmer

== Other ==
- Bayar Bayar Bayar, a 2023 protest song by Sukatani music group
- Bayar, Kasaragod, a village in the state of Kerala, India
- Celal Bayar University, a state university located in Manisa, Turkey
