= Hüseyin Yoğurtçu =

Turkish footballer

Personal information
- Date of birth: 30 June 1983 (age 43)
- Place of birth: Bursa, Turkey
- Height: 1.79 m (5 ft 10 1/2 in)
- Position: Central defender

Team information
- Current team: İnegöl Kafkas Gençlikspor (manager)

Senior career*
Years	Team	Apps	(Gls)
1998–2002	Gençlerbirliği	1	(0)
2001–2002	→ Gençlerbirliği Oftaşspor (loan)	?	(?)
2002–2004	Yimpaş Yozgatspor	42	(1)
2004–2006	Vestel Manisaspor	8	(0)
2005–2006	→ Büyükşehir Belediyespor (loan)	?	(?)
2006–2007	Yalovaspor	?	(?)
2007–2009	Kayseri Erciyesspor	31	(3)
2009–2010	Boluspor	19	(0)
2010–2011	Mersin İdmanyurdu	22	(0)
2011–2012	Kasımpaşa	15	(1)
2012–2013	Kayseri Erciyesspor	8	(0)
2013–2014	İnegölspor	0	(0)

Managerial career
- 2021–: İnegöl Kafkas Gençlikspor
- * Club domestic league appearances and goals

Hüseyin Yoğurtçu (born 30 June 1983) is a Turkish football coach and a former player. He is the manager of amateur side İnegöl Kafkas Gençlikspor.
