= 2008–09 Turkish Cup =

Fortis Türkiye Kupası

Tournament details
- Country: Turkey
- Dates: 3 September 2008 – 13 May 2009
- Teams: 72

Final positions
- Champions: Beşiktaş
- Runners-up: Fenerbahçe
- UEFA Europa League: Fenerbahçe

Tournament statistics
- Matches played: 105
- Top goal scorer(s): Bobô (7 goals)

The 2008–09 Turkish Cup, also known due to sponsorship reasons as the Fortis Türkiye Kupası, was the 47th edition of the annual tournament that determined the association football Süper Lig Turkish Cup (Turkish: Türkiye Kupası) champion under the auspices of the Turkish Football Federation (Turkish: Türkiye Futbol Federasyonu; TFF). (Beşiktaş) successfully contested Fenerbahçe in the final, 4–2. This tournament was conducted under the UEFA Cup system having replaced at the 44th edition a standard knockout competition scheme. Beşiktaş completed the double having also won 2008–09 Süper Lig.

== First round ==
The draw for the First Round was conducted at the headquarters of the TFF in Istanbul on 22 August 2008. The games were played on 3 and 4 September 2008.

Team 1	Score	Team 2
Kasımpaşa SK	2–2 (aet, p. 5–6)	Güngören Belediyespor
İstanbulspor A.Ş.	2–1	Gaziosmanpaşaspor
Sakaryaspor	2–0	Kartalspor
Beylerbeyi SK	1–2	Beykozspor
Kardemir Karabükspor	3–1	Boluspor
Çankırı Belediyespor	3–3 (aet, p. 1–3)	Samsunspor
Çaykur Rizespor	1–0	Orduspor
Giresunspor	3–2	Ofspor
Karşıyaka SK	1–3	Altay
Akhisar Belediyespor	1–2	Manisaspor
Alanyaspor	2–1	Denizli Belediyespor
Kayseri Erciyesspor	1–0	Bugsaş SK
Etimesgut Şekerspor	1–1 (aet, p. 2–4)	Tokatspor
Gaziantep B.Ş.B. Spor	2–1	Adanaspor
Adana Demirspor	0–0 (aet, p. 3–4)	İskenderun Demir Çelikspor
Mardinspor	1–2	Belediye Vanspor
Diyarbakırspor	2–1	Elazığspor
Malatya Belediyespor	4–5	Malatyaspor

== Second round ==
The draw for the Second Round was conducted at the headquarters of the TFF in Istanbul on 12 September 2008. The games were played on 24 and 25 September 2008.

Team 1	Score	Team 2
İstanbulspor A.Ş.	0–1	Ankaraspor
İskenderun Demir Çelikspor	1–5	Kayserispor
Beykozspor	0–1	Altay
Alanyaspor	2–1	Gençlerbirliği
Malatyaspor	1–0	Hacettepespor
Manisaspor	4–1	Kocaelispor
Çaykur Rizespor	0–2	Gaziantepspor
Konyaspor	1–0	Güngören Belediyespor
Bursaspor	3–0	Belediye Vanspor
MKE Ankaragücü	5–1	Giresunspor
Eskişehirspor	2–0	Diyarbakırspor
Samsunspor	1–1 (aet, p. 7–8)	Antalyaspor
Trabzonspor	2–0	Kardemir Karabükspor
İstanbul B.Ş.B. Spor	1–2	Tokatspor
Denizlispor	4–0	Sakaryaspor
Gaziantep B.Ş.B Spor	2–0	Kayseri Erciyesspor

== Group stage ==
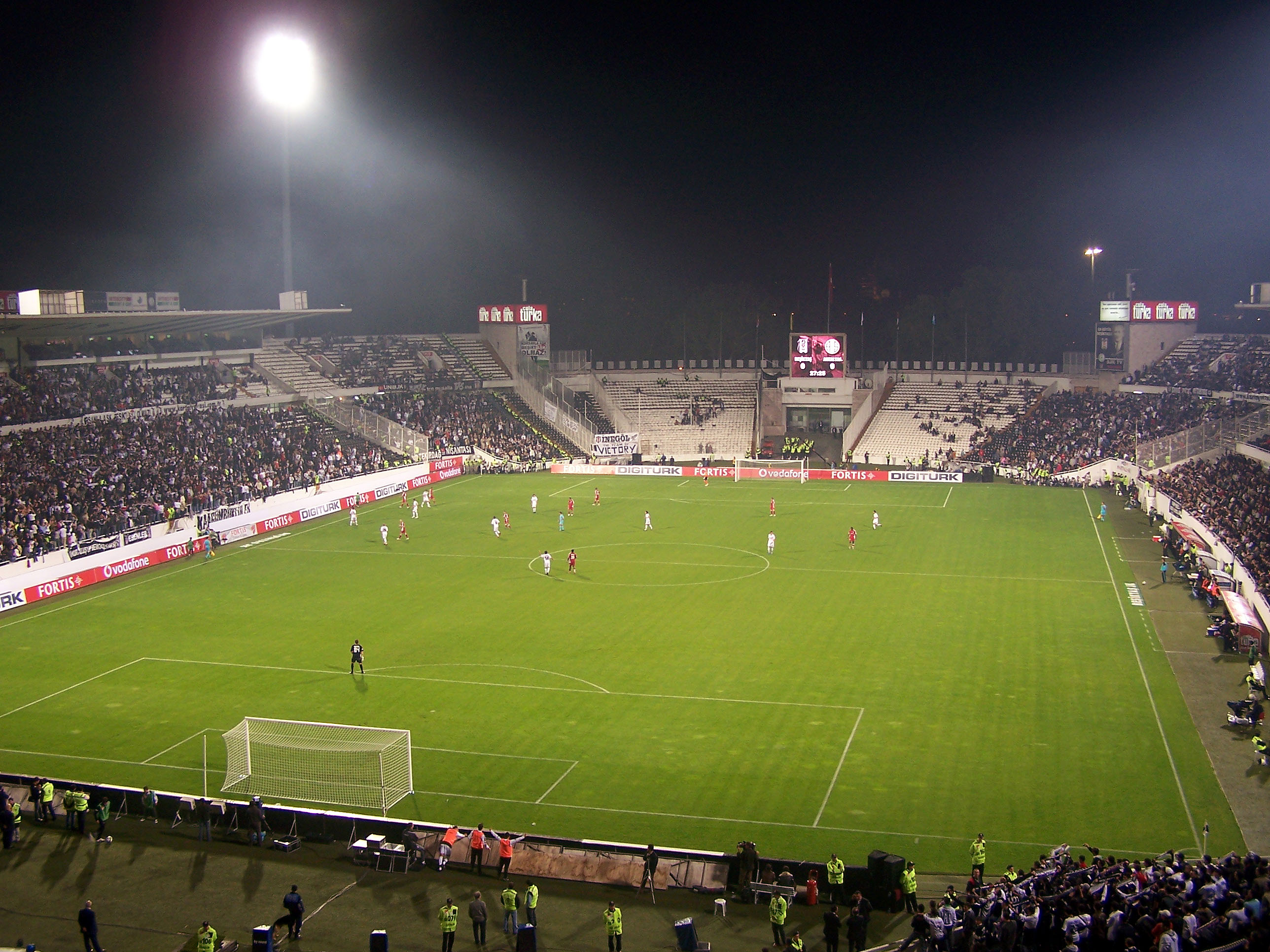
Group stage match between Beşiktaş and Antalyaspor.

The group stage consisted of four groups with five teams each. The four teams that finished first through fourth in 2007–08 Süper Lig were seeded as group heads: Galatasaray, Fenerbahçe, Beşiktaş and Sivasspor. The sixteen teams qualified through the first two rounds of elimination matches were randomly drawn into one of the four groups.

Every team played every other team of its group once, either home or away. The winners and runners-up of each group qualified for the quarterfinals. The games were played from 29 October 2008 to 18 January 2009.

=== Group A ===
Pos	Team	Pld	W	D	L	GF	GA	GD	Pts	BEŞ	ANT	GAZ	TRA	GBB
1	Beşiktaş	4	4	0	0	9	2	+7	12		3–0			3–1
2	Antalyaspor	4	2	1	1	8	6	+2	7			2–0	3–3	
3	Gaziantepspor	4	2	0	2	6	5	+1	6	0–1			3–1	
4	Trabzonspor	4	1	1	2	6	8	−2	4	1–2				1–0
5	Gaziantep BB	4	0	0	4	2	10	−8	0		0–3	1–3		

Source: tff.org (in Turkish)
Legend: Blue = home team win; Yellow = draw; Red = away team win.
Rules for classification: 1) points; 2) goal difference; 3) number of goals scored.

=== Group B ===
Pos	Team	Pld	W	D	L	GF	GA	GD	Pts	GAL	ANS	KAY	ALT	MAL
1	Galatasaray	4	3	1	0	8	4	+4	10			1–0		4–2
2	Ankaraspor	4	2	1	1	9	7	+2	7	1–1		1–2		
3	Kayserispor	4	2	1	1	6	4	+2	7				1–1	3–1
4	Altay	4	1	1	2	7	6	+1	4	1–2	2–3			
5	Malatyaspor	4	0	0	4	5	14	−9	0		2–4		0–3	

Source: tff.org (in Turkish)
Legend: Blue = home team win; Yellow = draw; Red = away team win.
Rules for classification: 1) points; 2) goal difference; 3) number of goals scored.

=== Group C ===
Pos	Team	Pld	W	D	L	GF	GA	GD	Pts	SİV	DEN	MAN	KON	ALA
1	Sivasspor	4	3	1	0	5	2	+3	10		1–0		1–0	
2	Denizlispor	4	2	1	1	4	3	+1	7			2–2		1–0
3	Manisaspor	4	1	2	1	5	5	0	5	0–1			1–0	
4	Konyaspor	4	1	0	3	4	3	+1	3		0–1			4–0
5	Alanyaspor	4	0	2	2	4	9	−5	2	2–2		2–2		

Source: tff.org (in Turkish)
Legend: Blue = home team win; Yellow = draw; Red = away team win.
Rules for classification: 1) points; 2) goal difference; 3) number of goals scored.

=== Group D ===
Pos	Team	Pld	W	D	L	GF	GA	GD	Pts	FEN	BUR	ESK	MKE	TOK
1	Fenerbahçe	4	4	0	0	7	0	+7	12		2–0	3–0		
2	Bursaspor	4	3	0	1	9	2	+7	9				1–0	6–0
3	Eskişehirspor	4	1	1	2	3	7	−4	4		0–2		2–1	
4	MKE Ankaragücü	4	1	0	3	2	4	−2	3	0–1				1–0
5	Tokatspor	4	0	1	3	1	9	−8	1	0–1		1–1		

Source: tff.org (in Turkish)
Legend: Blue = home team win; Yellow = draw; Red = away team win.
Rules for classification: 1) points; 2) goal difference; 3) number of goals scored.

== Bracket ==
Quarterfinals
1	Fenerbahçe	1	3	4
8	Bursaspor	0	1	1
4	Galatasaray	1	1	2(1)
5	Sivasspor (p)	1	1	2(3)
2	Antalyaspor	0	1	1
7	Beşiktaş	2	3	5
3	Denizlispor	1	1	2
6	Ankaraspor	1	2	3

Semifinals
Fenerbahçe	3	0	3
Sivasspor	1	0	1
Ankaraspor	1	2	3
Beşiktaş	3	1	4

Finals
Fenerbahçe	2
Beşiktaş	4

== Quarter-finals ==
In this round entered winners and runners-up of all of the previous round's groups. The draw was conducted at the headquarters of the TFF in Istanbul on 19 January 2009. The first legs were played on 27 and 28 January 2009. The second legs were played on 3, 4 and 5 February 2009.

Team 1	Agg.	Team 2	1st leg	2nd leg
Fenerbahçe	4–1	Bursaspor	1–0	3–1
Galatasaray	2–2 (p. 1–3)	Sivasspor	1–1	1–1 (aet)
Antalyaspor	1–5	Beşiktaş	0–2	1–3
Denizlispor	2–3	Ankaraspor	1–1	1–2

== Semi-finals ==
The draw was conducted at the headquarters of the TFF in Istanbul on 18 February 2009. The first legs were played on 3 and 4 March 2009. The second legs were played on 21 and 22 April 2009.

=== Summary table ===
Team 1	Agg.	Team 2	1st leg	2nd leg
Ankaraspor	3–4	Beşiktaş	1–3	2–1
Fenerbahçe	3–1	Sivasspor	3–1	0–0

=== 1st leg ===
3 March 2009 Semi-final	Ankaraspor	1–3	Beşiktaş	Ankara
20:00 EET (UTC+02)	Bilal 25' (pen.)		Delgado 42'; Hološko 77'; Yusuf 89'	Stadium: Yenikent ASAŞ Stadium; Referee: Selçuk Dereli

4 March 2009 Semi-final	Fenerbahçe	3–1	Sivasspor	Istanbul
20:00 EET (UTC+02)	Deniz 66'; Edu Dracena 75'; Deivid 84'		Bilica 82'	Stadium: Şükrü Saracoğlu Stadium; Referee: Fırat Aydınus

=== 2nd leg ===
21 April 2009 Semi-final	Sivasspor	0–0	Fenerbahçe	Sivas
20:00 EEST (UTC+03)				Stadium: 4 Eylül Stadium; Referee: Mustafa Kâmil Abitoğlu

22 April 2009 Semi-final	Beşiktaş	1–2	Ankaraspor	Istanbul
20:00 EEST (UTC+03)	Hološko 35'		Méyé 22'; Ömer 81'	Stadium: BJK İnönü Stadium; Referee: Hüseyin Göçek

== Final ==
13 May 2009 Final	Fenerbahçe	2–4	Beşiktaş	İzmir, Turkey
20:00 EEST (UTC+03)	Güiza 29'; Alex 90' (pen.)	Report (in Turkish)	Yusuf 6'; Bobô 56', 74'; Hološko 80'	Stadium: İzmir Atatürk Stadium; Attendance: 28,000; Man of the Match: Bobô
