= Rıza Şen =

Turkish footballer (born 1986)

Personal information
- Full name: Rıza Şen
- Date of birth: 8 March 1986 (age 40)
- Place of birth: Trabzon, Turkey
- Height: 1.75 m (5 ft 9 in)
- Position: Right midfielder

Youth career
- 1997–1999: G.O.P. Taşköprü
- 1999–2003: Karadeniz S.K.
- 2003–2005: Beşiktaş

Senior career*
Years	Team	Apps	(Gls)
2005–2011	Beşiktaş	2	(0)
2006–2007	→ Etimesgut Şekerspor (loan)	13	(1)
2006–2007	→ Arsinspor (loan)	14	(1)
2007	→ Zeytinburnuspor (loan)	18	(0)
2007–2008	→ Eyüpspor (loan)	2	(0)
2008–2009	→ Kasımpaşa (loan)	18	(1)
2009–2010	→ Orduspor (loan)	22	(1)
2011–2012	Körfez FK	40	(4)
2012–2013	Alanyaspor	24	(0)
2013–2014	Körfez FK	3	(0)
2014	Gaziosmanpaşaspor	10	(0)
2015	Kartalspor	4	(1)
2015–2017	Tekirdağspor	53	(8)
2017–2018	Iğdır Es Spor	0	(0)
2018	Yozgatspor 1959	0	(0)
2018–2019	Iğdır Es Spor	2	(0)
2019–2020	Kozanspor	16	(0)
2020	Kemerspor 2003	2	(0)

International career
2007	Turkey U20	1	(0)
- * Club domestic league appearances and goals

Rıza Şen (born 8 March 1986) is a Turkish former footballer.

== Career ==
Şen had involved in amateur football at a very early age of 11. He had begun football at GOP Taşköprüspor, and respectively played at Karadeniz S.K. until his Beşitaş transfer. He had his debut on the match against Kayseri Erciyesspor in June 2006. Şen had several chances to play football on professional level in lower leagues at different teams. He returned Beşiktaş in 2008 as a part of senior squad and subsequently loaned out to Bank Asya 1st League side Kasımpaşa SK.
