= Müslüm Yelken =

Turkish footballer

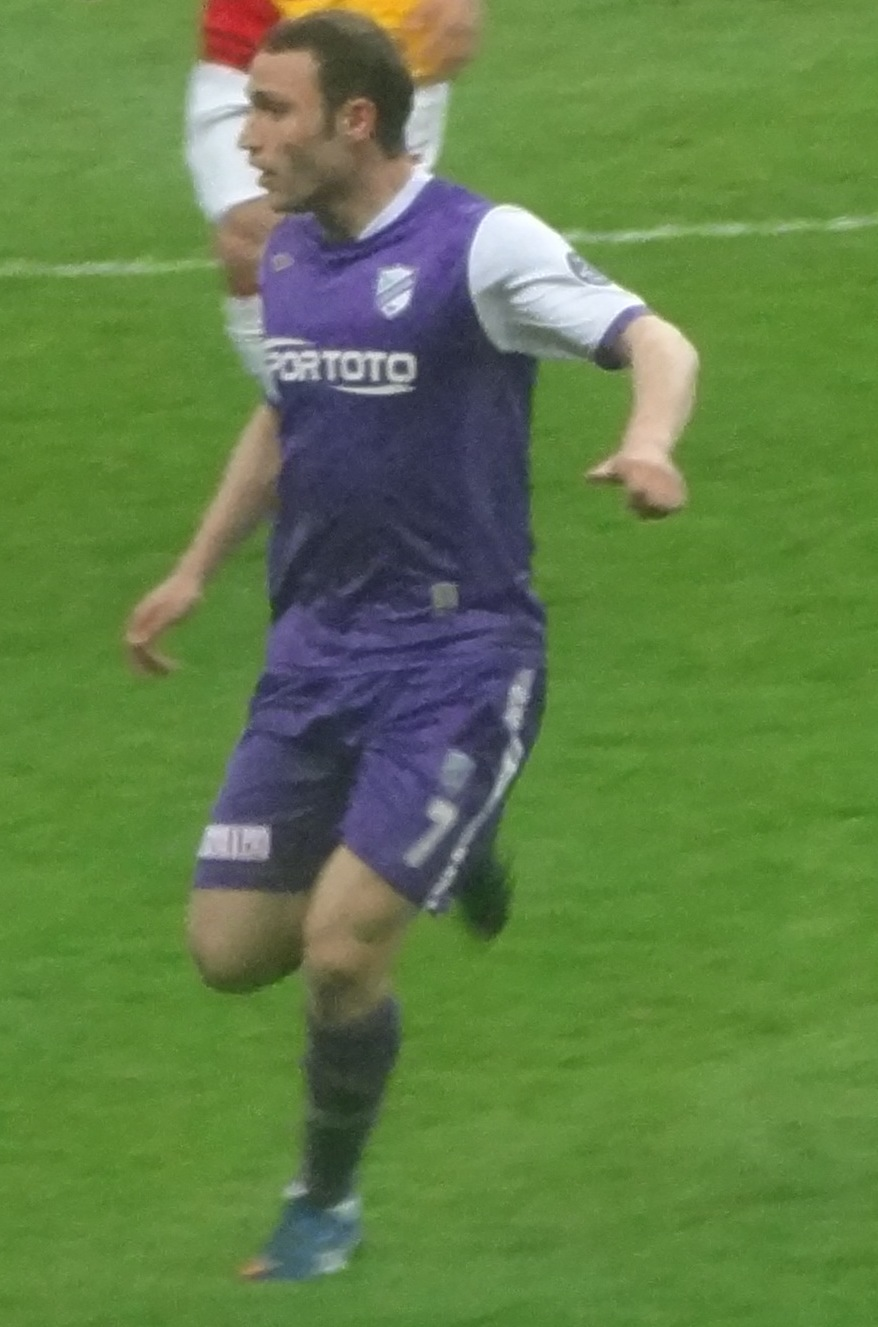

Personal information
- Full name: Müslüm Yelken
- Date of birth: 28 November 1988 (age 37)
- Place of birth: Develi, Turkey
- Height: 1.75 m (5 ft 9 in)
- Position: Right winger

Senior career*
Years	Team	Apps	(Gls)
2007–2008	FC 08 Villingen	12	(1)
2008–2013	Orduspor	103	(13)
2013–2014	Ankaraspor	24	(4)
- * Club domestic league appearances and goals

Müslüm Yelken (born 28 November 1988) is a Turkish footballer who plays as a winger. He made his Süper Lig debut on 23 October 2011.
