= Yunus Altun =

Turkish footballer (born 1977)

Personal information
- Full name: Yunus Altun
- Date of birth: 25 August 1977 (age 49)
- Place of birth: Eyüp, Istanbul, Turkey
- Height: 1.70 m (5 ft 7 in)
- Position: Striker

Senior career*
Years	Team	Apps	(Gls)
1996–1998	Hatayspor	48	(25)
1998–2000	Kayserispor	59	(26)
2000–2002	Konyaspor	71	(44)
2002–2003	Çaykur Rizespor	29	(24)
2003–200	Elazığspor	27	(16)
2004–2005	Malatyaspor	10	(5)
2005	Diyarbakirspor	17	(0)
2005–2006	Bursaspor	29	(11)
2006–2007	Mardinspor	8	(0)
2007	Kocaelispor	17	(2)
2007–2008	Etimesgut Şekerspor	36	(16)
2008–2009	Karşıyaka	29	(4)
2009–2010	Bucaspor	34	(11)
2010–2011	Mersin İdmanyurdu	15	(5)
2011	Karşıyaka	6	(1)
2011–2012	Altay	6	(1)
2012–2013	Sarıyer SK	27	(15)
2013	Altay	5	(1)
- * Club domestic league appearances and goals

Yunus Altun (born 25 August 1977 in Eyüp, Istanbul, Turkey) is a Turkish former professional footballer. He played as a striker.
