= Fatih Egedik =

Turkish professional footballer

Personal information
- Date of birth: 2 May 1982 (age 44)
- Place of birth: Karşıyaka, İzmir, Turkey
- Height: 1.77 m (5 ft 9 1/2 in)
- Position: Defensive midfielder

Senior career*
Years	Team	Apps	(Gls)
2000–2005	Altay	107	(8)
2005–2008	Denizlispor	89	(6)
2008–2010	Konyaspor	5	(0)
2009	→ Manisaspor (loan)	10	(0)
2010–2011	Mersin İdmanyurdu	39	(1)
2011–2012	Altay	27	(1)

International career
1999–2000	Turkey U17	6	(1)
1999–2000	Turkey U18	2	(0)
2003	Turkey U21	3	(0)
- * Club domestic league appearances and goals

Fatih Egedik (born 2 May 1982) is a Turkish former professional footballer who played as a defensive midfielder. Egedik was also a youth international. He studied at Ege University.

== Club career ==
Egedik started in 2000 with Altai as a defensive midfielder. At the end of 2008, he was transferred to Konyaspor'a. He played hired in 2009 by Manisaspor'da. Konyaspor'un terminated its contract with the Super League player. In 2010, he was transferred to Mersin Dormitory then went to Altay'a in 2011.
