= Bobô (footballer, born 1985) =

Brazilian footballer

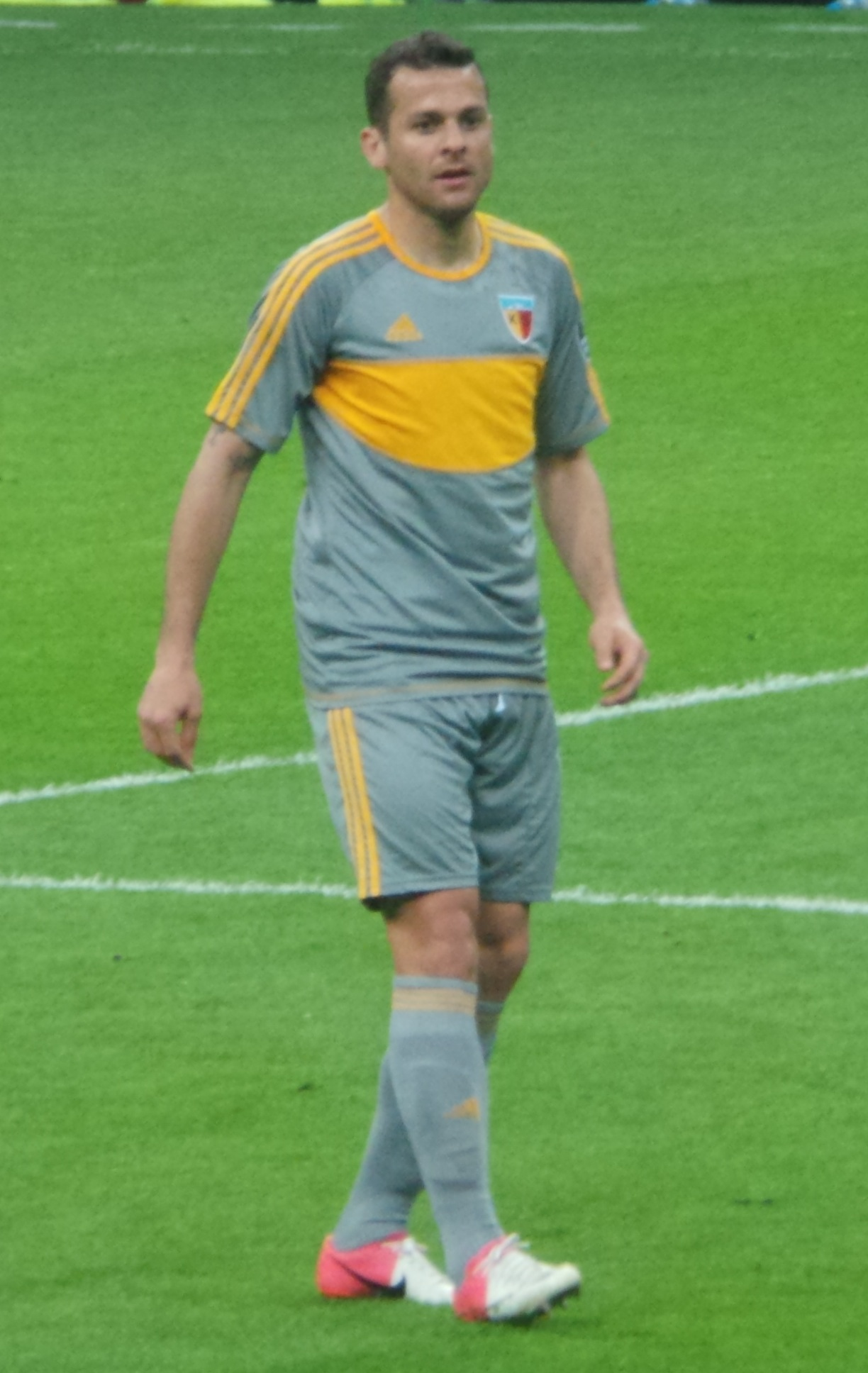
- Bobô in 2014

Personal information
- Full name: Deyvison Rogério da Silva
- Date of birth: 9 January 1985 (age 41)
- Place of birth: Gravatá, Brazil
- Height: 1.86 m (6 ft 1 in)
- Position: Forward

Youth career
- 2002–2003: Corinthians

Senior career*
Years	Team	Apps	(Gls)
2003–2005	Corinthians	31	(3)
2006–2011	Beşiktaş	144	(58)
2011–2012	Cruzeiro	6	(1)
2012–2015	Kayserispor	67	(32)
2015–2016	Grêmio	29	(6)
2016–2018	Sydney FC	57	(42)
2018–2019	Alanyaspor	11	(0)
2019–2020	Hyderabad FC	13	(5)
2020	Oeste	6	(1)
2021–2022	Sydney FC	43	(17)

International career
2005	Brazil U20	13	(7)
- * Club domestic league appearances and goals

Deyvison Rogério da Silva (born 9 January 1985), commonly known as Bobô, is a Brazilian former professional footballer who played as a forward.

== Club career ==
=== Beşiktaş ===
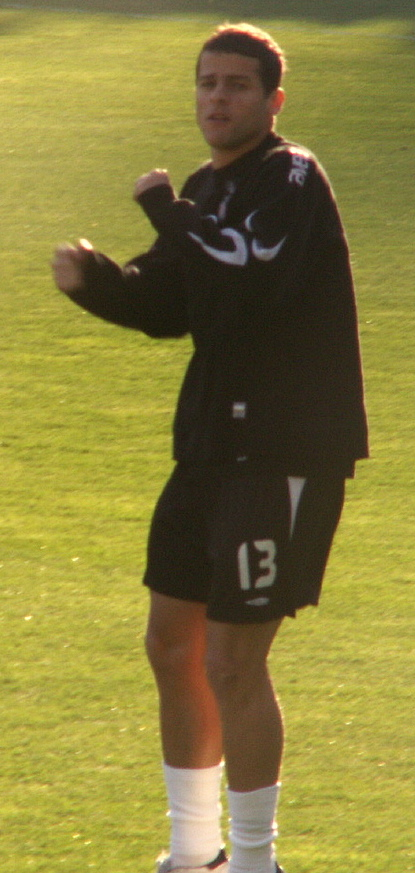
Bobô at Beşiktaş J.K in 2007–08 season

Bobô was leading goalscorer of Beşiktaş in the 2006–07 season, with 20 goals in all competitions. He began the 2007–08 season by scoring three goals in the first three matches, most notably a pair of goals in the 3–0 victory over FC Sheriff in the Champions League second qualifying round. His early season form prompted the Beşiktaş board to agree an extension of his contract until 2011.

On 20 October 2007, Beşiktaş faced Trabzonspor, an encounter subject to intense media interest. Trabzonspor took an early lead through Gökdeniz Karadeniz and were 2–0 up by the sixth minute thanks to a goal from Ibrahima Yattara. However, a Burak Yılmaz header put Beşiktaş back into contention and a penalty from Matías Delgado equalized the score just before half-time. In the second half, Beşiktaş goalkeeper Rüştü Reçber was sent-off for handling outside of the penalty area in the 79th minute, and Bobô replaced him until the end of the match. He made several saves, helping Beşiktaş secure a vital away victory. Bobô later admitted he had been worried about Trabzonspor's attacks on goal, particularly a free-kick by playmaker Ceyhun Eriş and a header by striker Umut Bulut.

On 25 October 2007, Bobô scored in Beşiktaş's 2–1 UEFA Champions League victory over Liverpool at the Inonu Stadium. He opened the scoring with a third-minute goal on 3 November 2007 in Beşiktaş' Süper Lig 11th matchday clash with Fenerbahçe at the Şükrü Saracoğlu Stadium, but the goal was followed by several misses as Beşiktaş ultimately lost 2–1, giving Fenerbahçe their first home victory over Beşiktaş in six-and-a-half years. This was the 319th encounter between two club. The following weekend, Bobô scored again (his 38th goal for Beşiktaş) in a 1–2 defeat at home to in-form Sivasspor. With the goal, he broke Mersad Kovačević's record to become Beşiktaş' all-time top scorer.

On 28 November 2007, Beşiktaş hosted Marseille on the fifth matchday of the 2007–08 UEFA Champions League group stage. Bobô scored his side's winning goal just before the final whistle in the 88th minute after a lob through-pass by Matías Delgado towards the space on right wing, where Bobô collected the ball, then went through the penalty box to beat goalkeeper Steve Mandanda. The final score finished 2–1 for Beşiktaş. The team kept their hopes of progression to the knockout phase until their last group stage match, against Porto. However, Beşiktaş could not manage to win in Portugal and were therefore eliminated as the fourth-place team in Group A.

Bobô played an important role in Beşiktaş winning both the Turkish Cup and Süper Lig in 2008–09. He scored 11 goals in the latter, making Beşiktaş' top goalscorer in the completion.

Bobô's contract expired at the end of the 2010–11 season. After failed negotiations between club and player, Beşiktaş declined to offer him a renewed contract. Previously, the "agent" of the footballer, Pini Zahavi, had requested the club pay €200,000 as a "transfer fee". However, the club refused, and Zahavi's subsequent lawsuit was dismissed by both FIFA and the Court of Arbitration for Sport.

=== Grêmio ===
On 25 July 2015, Bobô joined Grêmio on a contract lasting until the end of 2016.

=== Sydney FC ===
On 5 August 2016, it was reported that Bobô was in talks with Sydney FC in A-League to become their marquee player ahead of the 2016–17 season, and on 17 August, he signed a one-year contract with the A-League club worth approximately AUD$1 million.

Bobô started with a bang at Sydney FC, scoring on his debut in the FFA Cup against Blacktown City, and assisting two other goals in a 3–0 win . In his first A-League start, he scored and assisted a goal in the Sydney Derby against Western Sydney Wanderers, a match they ended up 4–0 winners. His partnership up front with Filip Hološko, Miloš Ninković and Alex Brosque was fruitful, as Sydney scored 34 goals in 14 matches.

On 24 February 2017, Bobô reached double-digit goal totals for Sydney FC in a convincing 3–1 win against Melbourne City. On 3 March, he scored a vital goal in the race for the 2016–17 A-League Premiership race, tapping-home a cross from Filip Hološko to give Sydney FC a 1–0 win over rivals Melbourne Victory in the Big Blue.

Bobô finished the 2016–17 regular season with 15 goals as Sydney FC claimed their first Premiership title since 2009–10.

==== 2017–18 ====
Bobô scored four goals in Sydney FC's 8–0 away victory against Darwin Rovers in the 2017 FFA Cup Round of 32. In the following FFA Cup round, Bobô scored another goal as the Sky Blues progressed to the quarter-finals at the expense of Bankstown Berries.

Bobô scored two braces within one week as Sydney qualified for the FFA Cup final in a comprehensive 5–1 win over A-League hopefuls South Melbourne. The second brace came against Wellington Phoenix in Round 2 of the A-League season in a 3–2 win.

In the 2017 FFA Cup Final, Bobô scored the winning goal with a header in the 112th minute to make the match 2–1. The goal ensured he finished with the tournament's golden boot with eight goals scored.

On 23 December 2017, Bobô scored his first A-League hattrick against Wellington Phoenix, as Sydney won 4–1 away from home. He became only the second player in A-League history to score back-to-back hat-tricks, as Sydney won 6–0 over Perth Glory on 30 December 2017.

On 20 January 2018, through his 1–1 equaliser against the Central Coast Mariners, Bobô equalled Marc Janko's 16 goal record of most scored in a single A-League season in 7 less games. In his next match in the Big Blue Derby, Bobô scored a brace in a 3–1 win against Melbourne Victory to break the record.

Bobô became the fastest player in A-League history, and equalled an Australian league record of reaching 20 goals for a season in shortest amount of time (20 games). This was broken in a 4–0 win away against Melbourne City. On 29 March 2018, Bobô broke the record for most goals in a single season with a double, putting him on 24 goals, during a 3–2 win over Perth Glory.

=== Alanyaspor ===
In July 2018, Bobô left Sydney FC, despite signing a one-year contract extension a month earlier, to join Turkish club Alanyaspor on an $800,000 transfer.

=== Hyderabad FC ===
In October 2019, Bobô announced he was leaving Alanyaspor after just one season to join Hyderabad FC in the Indian Super League. He missed the start of the season through injury, and made his debut on 25 November 2019 against Chennaiyin FC.

=== Return to Sydney FC ===
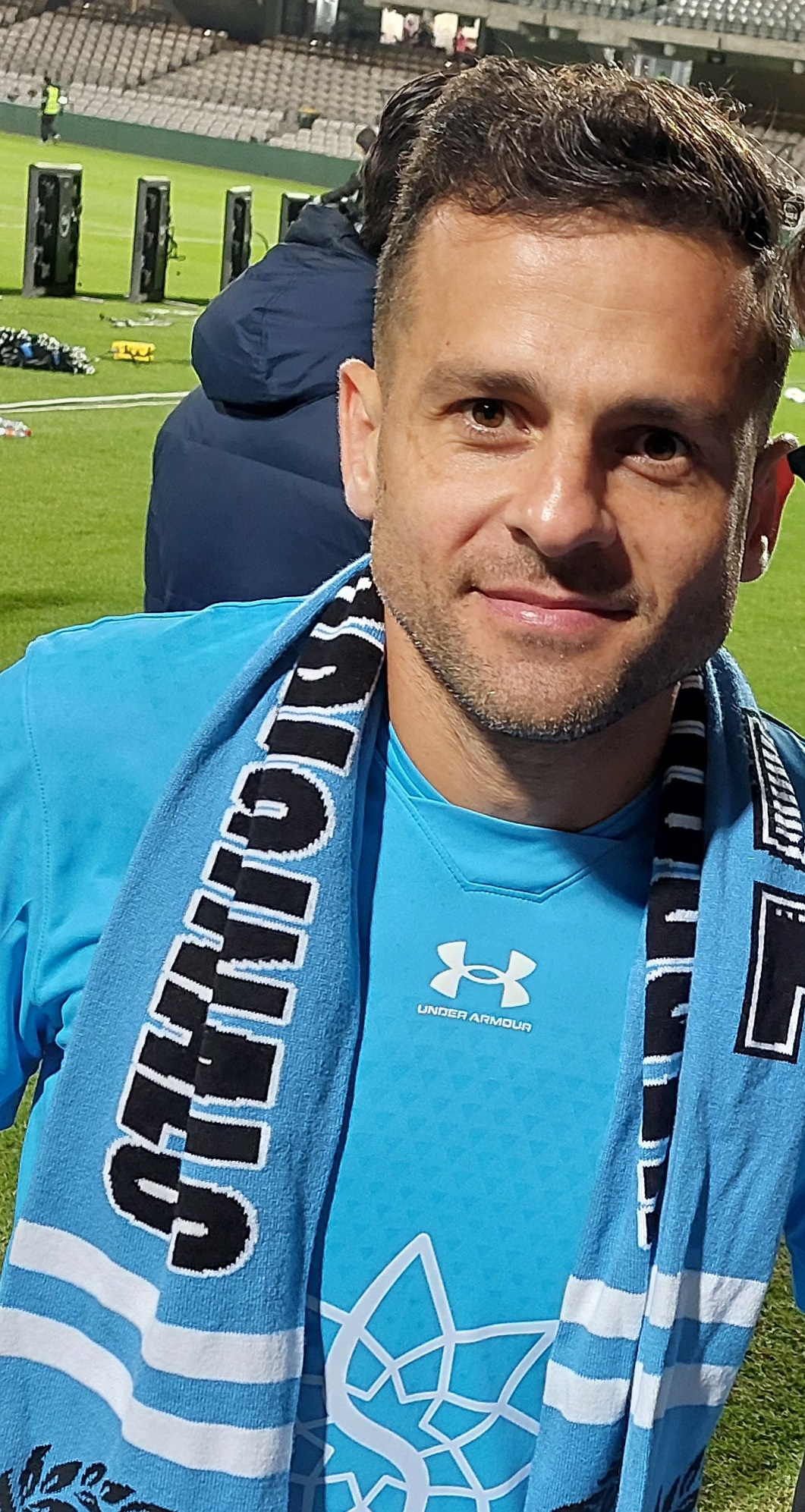
Bobô after his final game with Sydney FC.

Having left Hyderabad, Bobô returned to Australia and signed a 1-year deal with former club Sydney FC. He scored his first goal against Brisbane Roar in a 1-1 draw. Despite returning after the start of the season, Bobo amassed 12 goals in 23 appearances in the 2020-21 A-League season, and was the golden boot winner for the club during the season. He signed a 1-year extension with the club for the next season.

On 2 May 2022, Bobô announced that he would be retiring from football at the end of the 2021–22 season.

== International career ==
On 4 February 2008, Bobô was called up to the Brazil national team to face the Republic of Ireland on 6 February, replacing the injured Alexandre Pato in the squad. However, he did not make his first international appearance as he remained on the substitutes' bench for the match.

== Career statistics ==
As of 1 September 2022

Appearances and goals by club, season and competition
Club	Season	League			National Cup		League Cup/ State League		Continental		Total	
Club	Season	Division	Apps	Goals	Apps	Goals	Apps	Goals	Apps	Goals	Apps	Goals
Corinthians	2003	Série A	13	0	–		–		–		13	0
Corinthians	2004	Série A	4	0	–		–		–		4	0
Corinthians	2005	Série A	14	3	–		–		–		14	3
Corinthians	Total		31	3	0	0	0	0	0	0	31	3
Beşiktaş	2005–06	Süper Lig	14	5	7	4	–		–		21	9
Beşiktaş	2006–07	Süper Lig	27	11	9	7	1	0	6	2	43	20
Beşiktaş	2007–08	Süper Lig	21	10	3	1	1	1	10	4	35	16
Beşiktaş	2008–09	Süper Lig	32	12	8	7	–		4	1	44	20
Beşiktaş	2009–10	Süper Lig	29	12	3	1	1	0	5	1	38	14
Beşiktaş	2010–11	Süper Lig	21	8	8	4	–		12	4	41	16
Beşiktaş	Total		144	58	38	24	3	1	37	12	222	95
Cruzeiro	2011	Série A	6	1	–		–		–		6	1
Cruzeiro	2012	Série A	0	0	1	0	3	1	–		4	1
Cruzeiro	Total		6	1	1	0	3	1	0	0	10	2
Kayserispor	2012–13	Süper Lig	31	18	0	0	–		–		31	18
Kayserispor	2013–14	Süper Lig	17	3	1	1	–		–		18	4
Kayserispor	2014–15	TFF First League	19	11	5	3	–		–		24	14
Kayserispor	Total		67	32	6	4	0	0	0	0	73	36
Grêmio	2015	Série A	20	5	3	1	–		–		23	6
Grêmio	2016	Série A	9	1	0	0	17	6	6	1	32	8
Grêmio	Total		29	6	3	1	17	6	6	1	55	14
Sydney FC	2016–17	A-League	29 (Note: Includes A-League play-offs)	15	4	1	–		–		33	16
Sydney FC	2017–18	A-League	28	27	5	8	–		5 (Note: Appearances in AFC Champions League)	1	38	36
Sydney FC	Total		57	42	9	9	0	0	5	1	71	52
Alanyaspor	2018–19	Süper Lig	11	0	3	3	–		–		14	3
Hyderabad FC	2019–20	Indian Super League	13	5	–		–		–		13	5
Oeste	2020	Série B	6	1	–		–		–		6	1
Sydney FC	2020–21	A-League	23	12	–		–		0	0	23	12
Sydney FC	2021–22	A-League	20	5	2	0	–		4	2	26	7
Sydney FC	Total		43	17	2	0	0	0	4	2	49	19
Career total			407	165	62	41	23	8	52	16	544	230

== Honours ==
Corinthians

- Brazilian Série A: 2005

Beşiktaş

- Süper Lig: 2008–09
- Turkish Cup: 2005–06, 2006–07, 2008–09, 2010–11
- Turkish Super Cup: 2006

Sydney FC

- A-League Premiership: 2016–17, 2017–18
- A-League Championship: 2016–17
- FFA Cup: 2017

Individual

- Turkish Cup top scorer: 2006–07, 2008–09
- Turkish Cup Final – Man of the Match: 2009
- Süper Lig Golden Team of the Year: 2008–09
- FFA Cup top scorer: 2017
- A-League Golden Boot: 2017–18
- Sydney FC Player of the Year: 2017–18
