= Emin Aladağ =

Turkish footballer

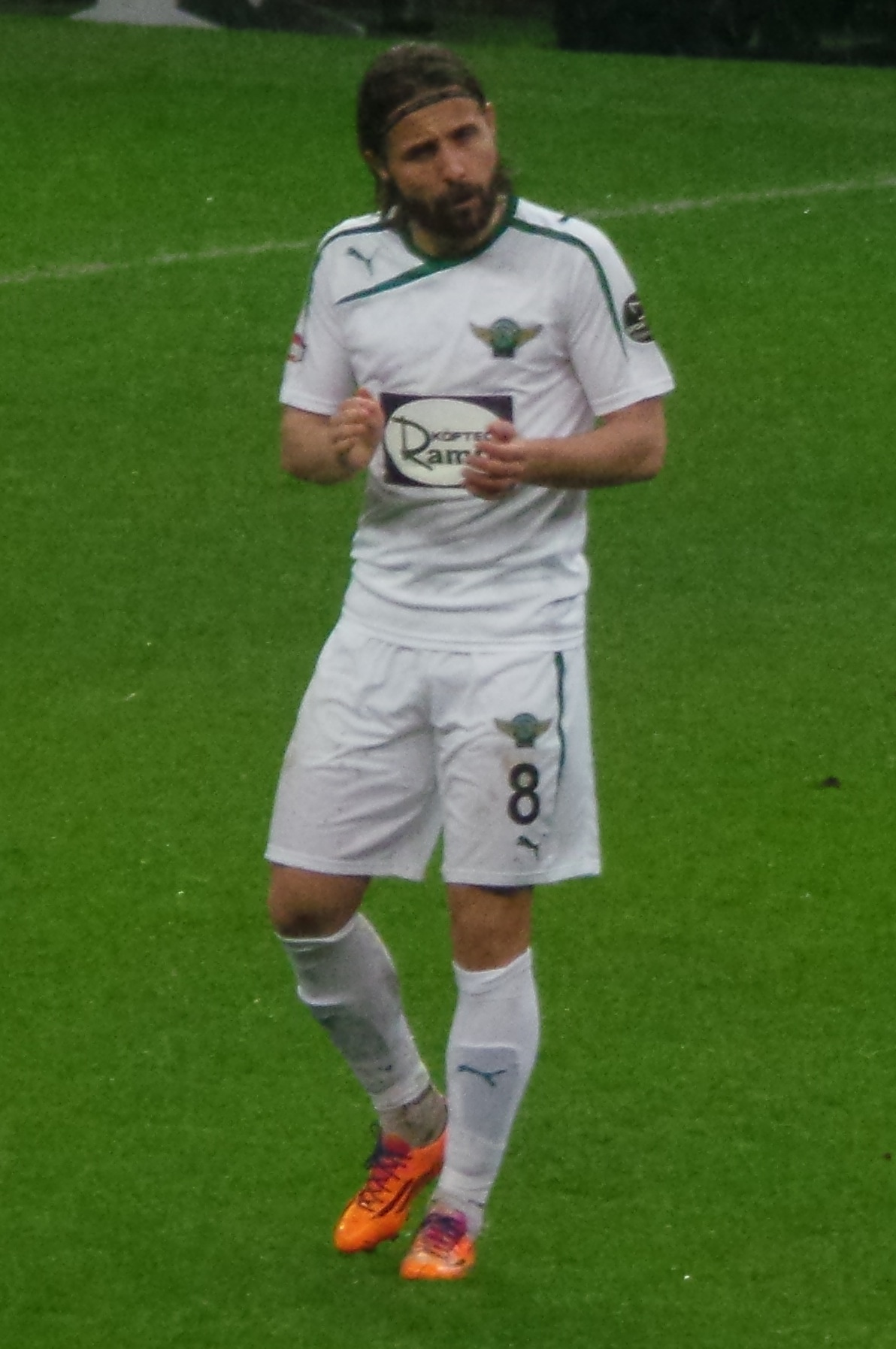
- Emin Aladağ (2014)

Personal information
- Full name: Emin Aladağ
- Date of birth: 25 February 1983 (age 43)
- Place of birth: Lüleburgaz, Turkey
- Height: 1.85 m (6 ft 1 in)
- Position: Attacking midfielder

Senior career*
Years	Team	Apps	(Gls)
2003–2004	Bursa Merinosspor	12	(2)
2004–2006	İnegölspor	64	(7)
2006–2012	Denizlispor	70	(9)
2006–2007	→ Samsunspor (loan)	13	(0)
2007–2008	→ Giresunspor (loan)	29	(3)
2012–2014	Akhisar Belediyespor	37	(1)
2014–2015	Bucaspor	31	(1)
2015–2016	Adana Demirspor	23	(0)
2016–2018	Bucaspor	30	(1)
2018–2019	Kahramanmaraşspor	23	(0)
2019–2020	Şile Yıldızspor	24	(0)
- * Club domestic league appearances and goals

Emin Aladağ (born 25 February 1983 in Lüleburgaz) is a Turkish former footballer.

== Career ==
On 31 August 2016, he rejoined Bucaspor on a one-year contract. Aladağ then joined Kahramanmaraşspor in January 2018, and left the club one year later.
