= Mehmet Budak =

Turkish footballer

Personal information
- Full name: Mehmet Budak
- Date of birth: August 1, 1980 (age 46)
- Place of birth: Doğanşehir, Turkey
- Height: 1.82 m (5 ft 11 1/2 in)
- Position: Left winger

Senior career*
Years	Team	Apps	(Gls)
1999–2000	Eski. Sekerspor	–	(–)
2000–2003	Eskişehirspor	78	(1)
2003–2005	Adanaspor	36	(1)
2005–2008	Malatyaspor	44	(3)
2006	→ Sakaryaspor (loan)	11	(0)
2008–2010	Altay	54	(1)
2010–2011	Mersin İdmanyurdu	10	(0)
2011	Tokatspor	9	(1)
2011–2013	Eyüpspor	58	(0)
2013–2014	Altay	11	(0)
2014–2015	Pazarspor	14	(0)
2015	68 Yeni Aksarayspor	10	(0)

International career
2005	Turkey B	1	(0)
- * Club domestic league appearances and goals as of 7 August 2015

Mehmet Budak (born August 1, 1980 in Doğanşehir, Turkey) is a Turkish footballer. He last played as a winger for 68 Yeni Aksarayspor.

== Club career ==
Budak previously played for Adanaspor and Malatyaspor in the Super Lig, and Eskişehirspor and Sakaryaspor in the TFF First League.
