= Şehmus Özer =

Turkish footballer

Personal information
- Full name: Şehmus Özer
- Date of birth: 10 May 1980
- Place of birth: Ergani, Diyarbakır, Turkey
- Date of death: 21 December 2016 (aged 36)
- Place of death: Sivrice, Elazığ, Turkey
- Height: 1.75 m (5 ft 9 in)
- Position: Forward

Youth career
- Mardinspor
- Erganispor

Senior career*
Years	Team	Apps	(Gls)
1998–1999	Erganispor	29	(13)
1999–2000	Yeni Malatyaspor	25	(2)
2000–2002	Malatyaspor	18	(1)
2002	→ Kayserispor (loan)	15	(0)
2002–2003	Gümüşhanespor	24	(4)
2003–2007	Mardinspor	119	(43)
2007–2008	Karşıyaka	31	(13)
2008–2010	Altay	57	(20)
2010–2011	Mersin İdmanyurdu	19	(4)
2011–2012	Akhisar Belediyespor	29	(8)
2012–2013	Şanlıurfaspor	6	(2)
2013	Karşıyaka	6	(0)
2013–2014	Altay	17	(6)
2014–2016	Amed SK	70	(27)
- * Club domestic league appearances and goals

Şehmus Özer (10 May 1980 – 21 December 2016) was a Turkish professional footballer who played as a forward for Amed SK. On 21 December 2016, Özer was killed in a car accident.
