= Levent Kartop =

Turkish footballer (born 1979)

Personal information
- Date of birth: 21 August 1979 (age 47)
- Place of birth: Denizli, Turkey
- Height: 1.70 m (5 ft 7 in)
- Position: Midfielder

Team information
- Current team: Kuşadasıspor (manager)

Senior career*
Years	Team	Apps	(Gls)
1997–2004	Denizlispor	135	(5)
1998	→ Muğlaspor (loan)		
1998–1999	→ Nevşehirspor (loan)		
2004–2006	Konyaspor	38	(9)
2006	Denizlispor	15	(0)
2006–2007	Antalyaspor	26	(0)
2007–2008	Adana Demirspor	30	(1)
2008	Neftchi Baku PFC		
2009	Kocaelispor	14	(0)
2009–2010	Altay	4	(0)
2010	Kocaelispor	4	(0)
2010–2011	Denizlispor	26	(0)
2011–2012	Akhisar Belediyespor	14	(0)
2012	Turgutluspor	16	(0)
2012	Eyüpspor	11	(0)

Managerial career
- 2013: Denizlispor U13
- 2013–2014: Denizlispor U15
- 2014–2015: Denizlispor (assistant)
- 2016: Altınordu U17
- 2016: Utaş Uşakspor
- 2018: Diyarbekırspor
- 2018–2019: 1928 Bucaspor (youth)
- 2019–2020: Denizlispor (assistant manager)
- 2020: Denizlispor (caretaker)
- 2021: 1922 Konyaspor (caretaker)
- 2022: Adıyaman
- 2023–: Kuşadasıspor
- * Club domestic league appearances and goals

Levent Kartop (born 21 August 1979) is a Turkish football manager and former player who is currently the manager of Kuşadasıspor.

He is a native of Denizli. A midfielder, he played for clubs including Süper Lig sides Denizlispor, Ankaragücü and Konyaspor. After Antalyaspor was promoted to the Süper Lig, he moved to Antalya side.
