= Burak Karaduman =

Turkish footballer

Personal information
- Full name: Burak Karaduman
- Date of birth: 23 February 1985 (age 41)
- Place of birth: Ankara, Turkey
- Height: 1.75 m (5 ft 9 in)
- Position: Midfielder

Team information
- Current team: Van BB
- Number: 35

Youth career
- 1998–2004: Ankaragücü

Senior career*
Years	Team	Apps	(Gls)
2004–2009	Ankaragücü	42	(1)
2009	→ Sakaryaspor (loan)	11	(0)
2009	Karşıyaka	0	(0)
2009–2010	Diyarbakırspor	13	(0)
2010–2011	Konyaspor	2	(0)
2011–2012	Mersin İdmanyurdu	8	(0)
2012	Turgutluspor	4	(0)
2012–2013	Giresunspor	10	(1)
2013	Altay	13	(1)
2013–2014	Karşıyaka	30	(2)
2014–2015	Denizlispor	13	(0)
2015	Sarıyer	4	(0)
2016	Konya Anadolu Selçukspor	10	(0)
2016–2017	Denizlispor	0	(0)
2017–	Van BB	4	(0)

International career
2002	Turkey U18	2	(0)
2005	Turkey U21	5	(0)
- * Club domestic league appearances and goals as of 9 March 2017 (UTC)

Burak Karaduman (born February 23, 1985, in Ankara, Turkey) is a Turkish footballer who plays for Denizlispor.
