= Mehmet Al =

Turkish footballer

Personal information
- Full name: Mehmet Al
- Date of birth: 11 July 1983 (age 43)
- Place of birth: İzmir, Turkey
- Position: Forward

Team information
- Current team: Sökespor

Senior career*
Years	Team	Apps	(Gls)
2001–2002	Bursaspor	0	(0)
2002–2003	Bursa Merinosspor	22	(5)
2003–2006	Bursaspor	63	(13)
2006–2007	Eskişehirspor	27	(4)
2007–2008	Elazığspor	26	(3)
2008–2009	Orduspor		
2009	Kartalspor	15	(2)
2009–2010	Kayseri Erciyesspor	30	(9)
2010–2013	Çaykur Rizespor	68	(12)
2013–2014	Balıkesirspor	5	(0)
2014–2015	Aydınspor	19	(5)
2015–2016	Menemen Belediyespor	8	(0)
2016	→ Kırklarelispor (loan)	11	(1)
2016–	Sökespor	6	(0)
- * Club domestic league appearances and goals as of 29 July 2015

Mehmet Al (born 11 July 1983) is a Turkish footballer who plays as a striker for Sökespor. He studied at Ege University.
