= Mustafa Aşan =

Turkish footballer (born 1988)

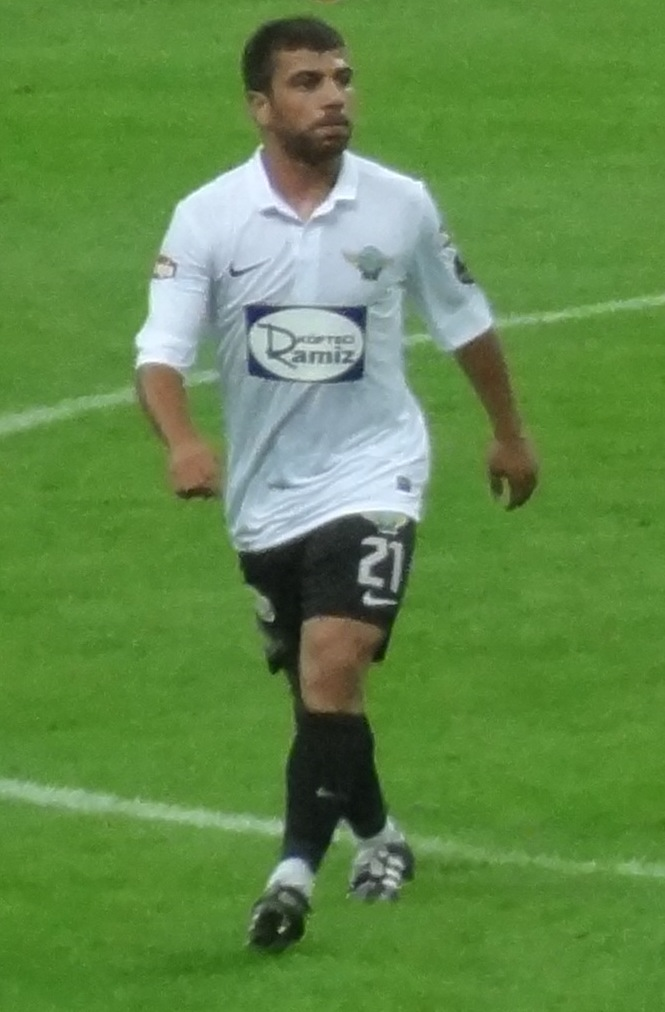
- Aşan with the Akhisar Belediyespor

Personal information
- Full name: Mustafa Aşan
- Date of birth: 11 September 1988 (age 38)
- Place of birth: Diyarbakır, Turkey
- Height: 1.70 m (5 ft 7 in)
- Position: Midfielder

Team information
- Current team: Karşıyaka SK
- Number: 5

Senior career*
Years	Team	Apps	(Gls)
2006–2008	Beşiktaş	0	(0)
2007	→ Eskişehirspor (loan)	0	(0)
2007–2008	→ İnegölspor (loan)	28	(1)
2008–2010	Manisaspor	0	(0)
2008–2009	→ İnegölspor (loan)	18	(0)
2009–2010	→ Akhisar Belediyespor (loan)	48	(0)
2010–2014	Akhisar Belediyespor	85	(4)
2014	→ Şanlıurfaspor (loan)	15	(0)
2014–2016	Şanlıurfaspor	16	(0)
2014–2015	→ Karşıyaka (loan)	31	(0)
2016–	Karşıyaka	126	(4)

International career
2007	Turkey U19	4	(0)
- * Club domestic league appearances and goals as of 26 July 2020

Mustafa Aşan (born 11 September 1988) is a Turkish footballer who plays as a midfielder for Karşıyaka. He made his Süper Lig debut on 17 August 2012.
