= Adem Büyük =

Turkish footballer

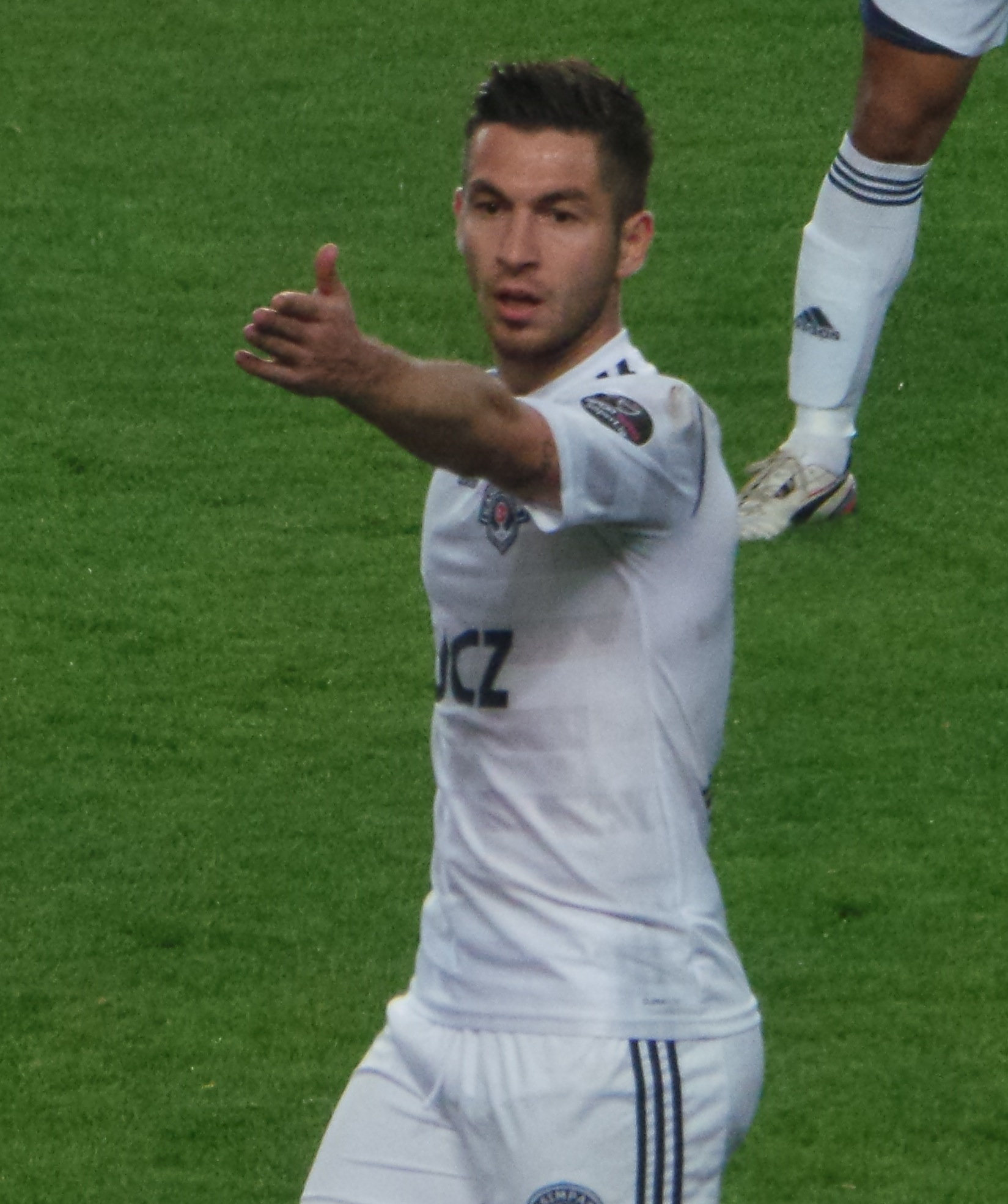

Personal information
- Date of birth: 30 August 1987 (age 39)
- Place of birth: Hopa, Artvin, Turkey
- Height: 1.77 m (5 ft 10 in)
- Positions: Left winger; striker

Youth career
- 2001–2002: Artvin Hopaspor
- 2002–2003: Arhavispor
- 2003–2005: Beşiktaş

Senior career*
Years	Team	Apps	(Gls)
2005–2008	Beşiktaş	0	(0)
2005	→ Zeytinburnuspor (loan)	14	(3)
2006–2007	→ Akçaabat Sebatspor (loan)	34	(8)
2007–2008	→ Altay (loan)	27	(16)
2008–2012	Manisaspor	16	(2)
2009–2010	→ Boluspor (loan)	27	(11)
2011	→ Mersin İdmanyurdu (loan)	14	(10)
2012–2017	Kasımpaşa	81	(19)
2017–2019	Yeni Malatyaspor	54	(10)
2019–2020	Galatasaray	26	(7)
2020–2022	Yeni Malatyaspor	54	(22)
2022–2023	Manisa	25	(5)
2023–2024	Karşıyaka	12	(2)

International career
2004–2005	Turkey U18	4	(2)
2007–2008	Turkey U21	4	(0)
2011	Turkey B	2	(0)
2013–2014	Turkey	4	(0)

Managerial career
- 2022: Yeni Malatyaspor (interim)
- 2024: Yeni Malatyaspor
- * Club domestic league appearances and goals

Adem Büyük (born 30 August 1987) is a Turkish professional football manager and a former player who played primarily as a striker but also as a left winger. He is a former international for Turkey, also earning caps with the U-18 and U-21 squads.

== Club career ==
Büyük started his career with local club Artvin Hopaspor. He spent a year at Arhavispor before Beşiktaş transferred him in 2003. Büyük did not make any appearances for the club, spending his time on loan at Zeytinburnuspor, Akçaabat Sebatspor, and Altay. Manisaspor transferred him in 2008, and he spent the second half of 2010–10 season on loan at Mersin İdmanyurdu.

On 28 June 2019, Adem signed a two-year deal on a free transfer to Galatasaray.

== International career ==
On 15 November 2013, Büyük played his first national match for Turkey against Northern Ireland in Adana.

== Managerial career ==
He was appointed a player–coach at Yeni Malatyaspor on 7 February 2022, after Marius Șumudică left the team the same day. On 25 February he left the club.

== Honours ==
Galatasaray

- Süper Kupa (1): 2019

Individual

- U21 Ligi Top Scorer: 2004–05 (26 goals)
