= Faruk Bayar =

Turkish footballer (born 1981)

Faruk
Personal information
- Full name: Faruk Bayar
- Date of birth: 11 October 1981 (age 45)
- Place of birth: Eskişehir, Turkey
- Height: 1.83 m (6 ft 0 in)
- Position: Defender

Senior career*
Years	Team	Apps	(Gls)
2003–2005	Istanbulspor	55	(1)
2005–2007	Gaziantepspor	52	(0)
2008	Kasımpaşa SK	18	(0)
2008–2010	Sivasspor	25	(0)
2010–2011	Mersin İdman Yurdu	7	(0)
2012–2013	Tavşanlı Linyitspor	18	(0)
2013–2014	Orduspor	2	(0)
- * Club domestic league appearances and goals

Faruk Bayar (born October 11, 1981 in Eskişehir) is a Turkish retired footballer. He played left back, left midfield and defensive midfield. Standing at 178 cm, he wore the number 26 jersey. He became professional in 1999–2000 season at Eskişehirspor.

He has played for the Turkey under-21 team and 1 time for Turkey national football team. He has previously played for Eskişehirspor (1999–2002), İstanbulspor (2002–2005), Gaziantepspor (2005–2007), Kasımpaşa S.K. (2007–2008), Sivasspor (2008–2010) and Mersin İdman Yurdu (2010–2011).
