= Yusuf Şimşek =

Turkish manager and footballer

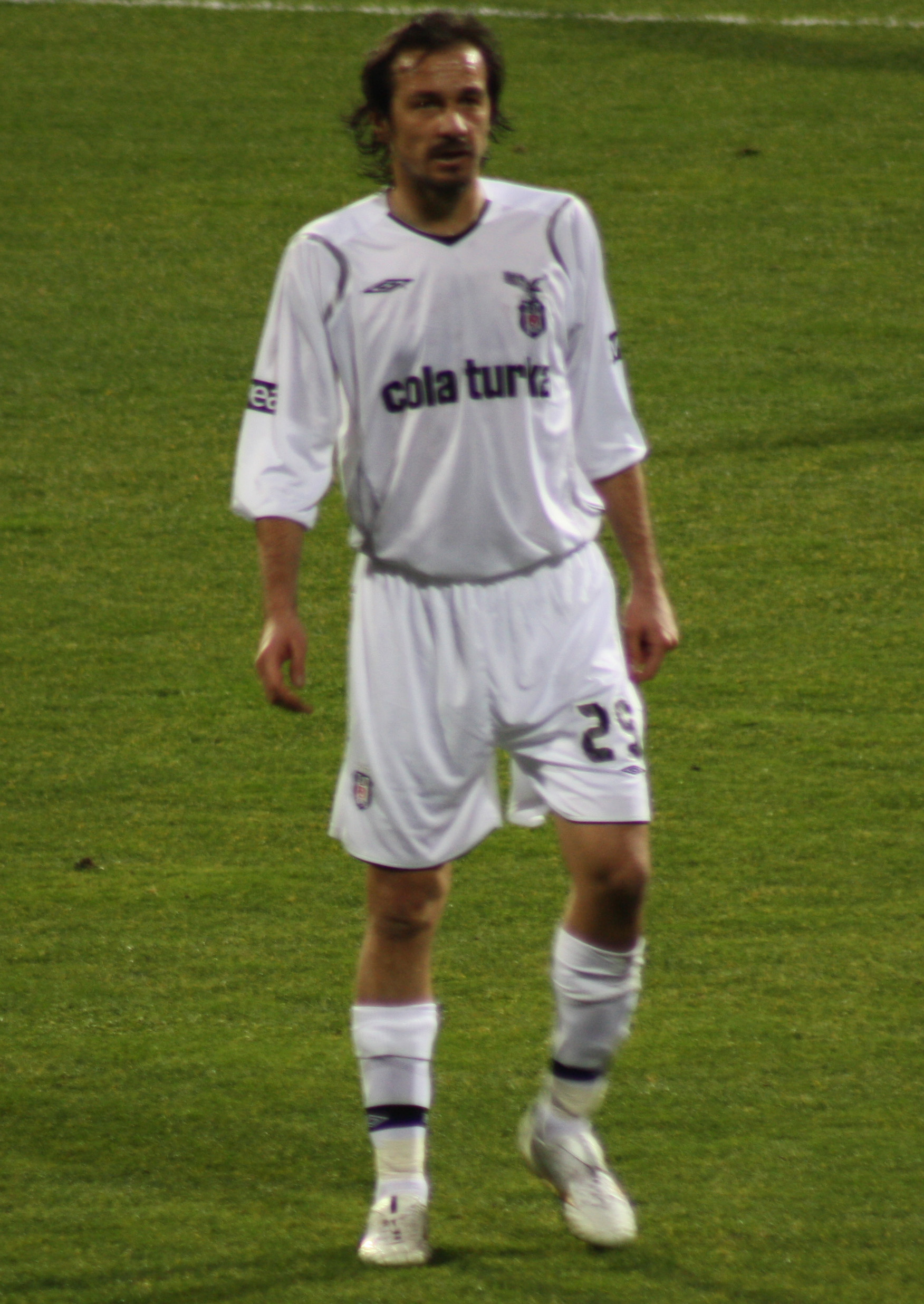
- Şimşek in 2009

Personal information
- Date of birth: 20 July 1975 (age 51)
- Place of birth: Antalya, Turkey
- Height: 1.88 m (6 ft 2 in)
- Position: Attacking midfielder

Team information
- Current team: Serikspor (head coach)

Senior career*
| Years | Team | Apps | (Gls) |
| 1996–2000 | Kemerspor | 28 | (6) |
| 2000–2002 | Denizlispor | 82 | (39) |
| 2002–2004 | Fenerbahçe | 89 | (9) |
| 2004 | → Gaziantepspor (loan) | 26 | (4) |
| 2004–2005 | Ankaraspor | 20 | (0) |
| 2004–2005 | Akçaabat Sebatspor | 21 | (3) |
| 2005–2008 | Denizlispor | 89 | (16) |
| 2008–2009 | Bursaspor | 10 | (0) |
| 2009–2011 | Beşiktaş | 42 | (7) |
| 2011 | Kayseri Erciyesspor | 10 | (0) |
| 2011–2012 | Turgutluspor | 8 | (3) |
| Total | | 425 | (87) |

International career
| 2007–2009 | Turkey | 6 | (0) |

Managerial career
- 2011–2012: Turgutluspor (Player / Manager)
- 2012–2013: Denizlispor
- 2014: Karşıyaka
- 2015: Antalyaspor
- 2016: Karşıyaka
- 2016–2017: Mersin İdmanyurdu
- 2017: Denizlispor
- 2018: Fatih Karagümrük
- 2019: Afjet Afyonspor
- 2020: Balıkesirspor
- 2021: Balıkesirspor
- 2022: 1461 Trabzon
- 2022: Isparta 32
- 2022–2023: Çorluspor 1947
- 2023–2024: Altay
- 2024: Bandırmaspor
- 2024–2025: Adanaspor
- 2025–2026: Altay
- 2026: Altınordu
- 2026–: Serikspor
- * Club domestic league appearances and goals

Yusuf Şimşek (born 20 July 1975) is a Turkish football manager and former player who is the head coach of TFF 2. Lig club Serikspor.

== Club career ==
=== Fenerbahçe SK ===
During his time at Fenerbahçe, his teammate Ariel Ortega once highlighted Yusuf's incredible talent with the ball: "This guy could get past a man even in a phone booth".

=== Later career and Beşiktaş J.K. ===
As a player with a background in Denizlispor for 4 seasons, in Fenerbahçe S.K. for 2 seasons and in many other Anatolian squads including Ankaraspor, Bursaspor, Yusuf's transition to Beşiktaş J.K. stirred the football community. It was claimed that Trabzonspor made a proposal for Yusuf long before Beşiktaş did, and further that both Bursaspor and Yusuf himself accepted the formal offer that Trabzonspor made. However, that claim was not verified. Actually, Trabzonspor's offer included a part-exchange deal sending Adnan Güngör to Bursaspor; but the deal went off when Adnan refused to exchange teams. Then after Mustafa Denizli's persistence for an efficient playmaker, Yusuf was transferred to Beşiktaş J.K., for a part-exchange deal including Tuna Üzümcü plus 400k euro.

Following the accusations directed by Fenerbahçe and Trabzonspor supporters, which were mainly centered on "betrayal", Yusuf felt the need to make it public that he had always been a Beşiktaş J.K. fan, displaying a childhood photograph where he could be seen in a striped black&white jersey. He further stated that he was deeply affected by the legendary era between early 80s-mid 90s under the helm of Gordon Milne, which includes successive title achievements.

The transfer was severely criticized in Beşiktaş J.K. community as well, due to exchanging 2 promising youngsters for an aging player. In such a harsh climate, where even Beşiktaş board could not give a solid vote for him, he immediately assumed the role of a playmaker, and became one of the key players carrying the team through the way to 2 most important trophies of Turkish football in 2008/09 season. Although his teammate Matias Delgado did not have any real competition for the attacking midfielder position for 2 years up until then, Yusuf was quick to take up the position from his hands. For the 2008/09 season, he made 27 league apps (10 with Bursaspor, 17 with Beşiktaş) and 6 Fortis Turkish Cup apps (all with Beşiktaş); scoring 5 goals at total (3 league goals/2 cup goals; all for Beşiktaş). He especially scored crucial goals against arch-rivals Galatasaray (in league) and Fenerbahçe (in Türkiye Kupası 2008–09 final) as the finals for both competitions draw near.

=== Kayseri Erciyesspor ===
On 18 January 2011, Yusuf signed a two-year contract to the Kayseri Erciyesspor. As of 2016, he was playing for Turgutluspor in the TFF Sportoto 2. Lig.

== International career ==
Despite his technical capacity and ball possession skills, shuffles, feints and dribbles, Yusuf was able to attain fame throughout Turkey in his late 20s. Due to playing his most remarkable games through the ages of 26–33, and with the addition of a playing style that is generally labeled as "selfish", he has been called up to play for the national squad only 6 times.

== Managerial statistics ==
As of 25 October 2015

| Team | From | To | Record | | | | |
| Team | From | To | G | W | D | L | Win % |
|---|---|---|---|---|---|---|---|
| Denizlispor | 2012 | 2013 | 9 | 4 | 2 | 3 | 44.44 |
| Karşıyaka | 2013 | 2014 | 38 | 16 | 8 | 14 | 42.11 |
| Antalyaspor | 2015 | Present | 24 | 12 | 6 | 6 | 50.00 |
| Total | | | 0 | 0 | 0 | 0 | — |
