= Koray Şanlı =

Turkish footballer

Personal information
- Date of birth: 26 December 1989 (age 36)
- Place of birth: Mersin, Turkey
- Height: 1.85 m (6 ft 1 in)
- Position: Centre back

Team information
- Current team: Batman Petrolspor
- Number: 22

Youth career
- 2002–2004: Istanbulspor
- 2003–2004: Güngoren
- 2004–2005: Bahçelievler Olimpikspor
- 2005–2007: Beşiktaş

Senior career*
Years	Team	Apps	(Gls)
2007–2009	Beşiktaş	0	(0)
2008–2009	→ Akçaabat Sebatspor (loan)	30	(1)
2009–2013	Adanaspor	78	(1)
2013–2016	Yeni Malatyaspor	57	(6)
2016	Gümüşhanespor	3	(0)
2016–2017	Amed SK	23	(0)
2017–2018	Kırklarelispor	9	(0)
2018	Tarsus İdman Yurdu	4	(1)
2019	Batman Petrolspor	8	(0)

International career^{‡}
2007	Turkey U-18	14	(1)
2007–2008	Turkey U-19	13	(1)
- * Club domestic league appearances and goals as of 8 July 2020 ‡ National team caps and goals as of 8 July 2020

Koray Şanlı (born 26 December 1989, in Mersin) is a Turkish football defender. He last played at Batman Petrolspor.

Şanlı joined Beşiktaş at the age of 15, on amateur level, in 2005. Although he was added up to match squads multiple times in 2007–08 season, he never could make himself selected for starting line-up at senior level.
