= 2003–04 Mersin İdmanyurdu season =

Mersin İdmanyurdu
2003–04 season
- President: Macit Özcan
- Head coach: Yücel İldiz (till 19 September 2003); Mehmet Şahan (till 28 December 2003); Levent Eriş (till 31 May 2004)
- Stadium: Tevfik Sırrı Gür Stadium; Mersin, Turkey
- TFF First League: 15th
- Turkish Cup: Eliminated at R2
- Top goalscorer: League: Taner Demirbaş (15); All: Taner Demirbaş (15)

Mersin İdmanyurdu (also Mersin İdman Yurdu, Mersin İY, or MİY) Sports Club; located in Mersin, east Mediterranean coast of Turkey in 2003–04. The team participated in Second League Category A for 2nd time in the league's 3rd season. Mersin İdmanyurdu football team has finished 2003–04 season in 15th place in Second League Category A. Mersin idmanyurdu participated in 2003–04 Turkish Cup and eliminated at second round.

Macit Özcan was club president. MİY started to season with Yücel İldiz as the head coach. After 4th round Mehmet Şahan became the head coach. In the mid-season Levent Eriş took over the management of the team. Ufuk Talay was the most appeared player (33), while top goalscorer was Taner Demirbaş (15).

== 2003–04 TFF First League participation ==
In 2003–04 season Mersin idmanyurdu has participated in Second League Category A (the league has been played under the name of "Second League Category A" between 2001–02 and 2005–06; "TFF League A" in 2006–07; and "TFF First League" since 2007–08. Also sponsor names have been included in various seasons.). 18 teams attended in the league. Winners, runners-up and play-off winners were directly promoted to 2004–05 Süper Lig. Bottom three teams were relegated to 2003–04 TFF Second League.

=== Results summary ===
Mersin İdmanyurdu (MİY) 2003–04 Second League Category A season league summary:

	Overall									Home								Away							
Stage	Pc	Pl	W	D	L	GF	GA	GD	Pt	Pl	W	D	L	GF	GA	GD	Pt	Pl	W	D	L	GF	GA	GD	Pt
First half	18	17	4	2	11	14	25	-11	14	8	4	0	4	10	7	+3	12	9	0	2	7	4	18	-14	2
Second half		17	5	5	7	24	19	+5	20	9	4	2	3	14	7	+7	14	8	1	3	4	10	12	-2	6
Overall	15	34	9	7	18	38	44	-6	34	17	8	2	7	24	14	+10	26	17	1	5	11	14	30	-16	8

Sources: 2003–04 Turkish Second Football League pages.

=== League table ===
Mersin İdmanyurdu (MİY) 2003–04 Second League Category A season place in league table.

Pc	Team	Games				Goals		Pts	Home			Away		
Pc	Team	Pl	W	D	L	F	A	Pts	F–A	R	Pc	F–A	R	Pc
1	Sakaryaspor (C) (P)	34	21	5	8	62	36	68	0–1	24	17	1–5	7	18
2	Kayseri Erciyesspor (P)	34	19	9	6	47	27	66	1–0	19	18	0–3	2	11
3	Büyükşehir Belediye Ankaraspor (P)	34	19	8	7	58	41	65	0–1	12	18	1–2	29	17
4	Vestel Manisaspor	34	18	7	9	59	36	61	1–2	5	19	1–2	22	17
5	Kocaelispor	34	16	9	9	54	44	57	0–1	32	15	0–1	15	18
6	Kayserispor	34	15	10	9	59	51	55	0–1	28	17	2–4	11	18
7	Antalyaspor	34	14	8	12	45	45	50	4–0	8	16	1–2	25	18
8	Sivasspor	34	14	6	14	44	46	48	4–0	30	16	0–1	13	18
9	Altay	34	12	11	11	58	48	47	0–3	10	18	1–1	27	17
10	Türk Telekomspor	34	11	12	11	40	38	45	0–0	21	17	0–2	4	18
11	Yimpaş Yozgatspor	34	10	9	15	44	52	39	0–1	3	14	0–0	20	18
12	Karşıyaka	34	10	9	15	36	46	39	1–0	1	6	3–4	18	18
13	İstanbul Büyükşehir Belediyespor	34	10	7	17	42	50	37	2–0	14	18	2–0	31	15
14	Dardanelspor	34	9	8	17	46	58	35	2–2	23	16	1–2	6	18
15	Mersin İdmanyurdu	34	9	7	18	38	44	34						
16	Adana Demirspor (R)	34	8	9	17	36	56	33	2–0	16	18	1–1	33	15
17	Göztepe (R)	34	8	9	17	36	62	33	4–0	26	17	0–0	9	16
18	İzmirspor (R)	34	8	7	19	37	61	31	3–2	34	15	0–0	17	18

Three points for a win. Rules for classification: 1) points; 2) tie-break; 3) goal difference; 4) number of goals scored. In the score columns first scores belong to MİY.

(C): Champions; (P): Promoted to 2004–05 Süper Lig; (R): Relegated to 2004–05 TFF Second League.

Source: 2003-04 TFF First League pages from TFF website, Turkish-Soccer website, and Maçkolik website.

=== Results by round ===
Results of games MİY played in 2003–04 Second League Category A by rounds:

Round	1	2	3	4	5	6	7	8	9	10	11	12	13	14	15	16	17	18	19	20	21	22	23	24	25	26	27	28	29	30	31	32	33	34
Ground	H	A	H	A	H	A	A	H	A	H	A	H	A	H	A	H	A	A	H	A	H	A	H	H	A	H	A	H	A	H	A	H	A	H
Result	W	L	L	L	L	L	L	W	D	L	L	L	L	W	L	W	D	L	W	D	D	L	D	L	L	W	D	L	L	W	W	L	D	W
Position	6	11	14	18	18	18	18	16	16	18	18	18	18	18	18	18	18	18	18	18	17	17	16	17	18	17	17	17	17	16	15	15	15	15

Source: 2003-04 TFF First League pages.
A = Away; H = Home; W = Win; D = Draw; L = Loss

=== First half ===
Mersin İdmanyurdu (MİY) 2003–04 Second League Category A season first half game reports is shown in the following table. Kick off times are in EET and EEST.

28 August 2003 Round 1	Mersin İdmanyurdu	1 – 0	Karşıyaka	Tevfik Sırrı Gür Stadium, Mersin
Thursday, 17:00	Özgür Nasuh 3' (F); Taner Demirbaş (yellow card) 22'; Mehmet Ali Honca (yellow card) 57'; Ufuk Talay (yellow card) 57'; Savaş Göcen (yellow card) 80'	Report	(yellow card) 33' Tufan Apaydın; (yellow card) 38' Cem Koşanoğlu; (yellow card) 39' Alper Mehmetoğlu; (yellow card) 56' Levent Yücel	Referee: Bülent Yıldırım

30 August 2003 Round 2	Kayseri Erciyesspor	3 – 0	Mersin İdmanyurdu	Kayseri Atatürk Stadium, Kayseri
Saturday, 19:00	Mustafa Özsöğüt 46' (F); Mustafa Tuna Kaya 49' (F); Hakkı Daş 68' (F)	Report	(yellow card) 35' Mehmet Ali Honca; (yellow card) 40' Ahmet Kolcu; (yellow card) 63' Mustafa Sarp	Referee: Bünyamin Gezer

7 September 2003 Round 3	Mersin İdmanyurdu	0 – 1	Yimpaş Yozgatspor	Tevfik Sırrı Gür Stadium, Mersin
Sunday, 16:00	Mustafa Sarp (yellow card) 17'; Ufuk Talay (yellow card) 19'; Ali Kunter (yellow card) 29'; Emre Eren (yellow card) 60'	Report	43' (pen.) Hikmet Çapanoğlu; (yellow card) 44' (red card) Nebi Emre Doğru; (yellow card) 87' Armağan Vatanoğlu; (yellow card) 89' Cem Kargın	Referee: Yıldıray Arslan

13 September 2003 Round 4	Türk Telekomspor	2 – 0	Mersin İdmanyurdu	Türk Telekom Stadium, Ankara
Saturday, 16:00	Ömer Faruk Bayar 47' (H); Burhan Coşkun 79' (F); Tayfun Özkan (yellow card) 17'; Emre Güngör (yellow card) 38'; Ercan Naşal (yellow card) 54'; Umut Çakır (yellow card) 66'	Report	(yellow card) 38' Emre Eren; (yellow card) 87' Ufuk Talay; (yellow card) 88' Ahmet Arslaner; (yellow card) 89' Özgür Nasuh	Referee: Mehmet Berkant Mercanlı

21 September 2003 Round 5	Mersin İdmanyurdu	1 – 2	Vestel Manisaspor	Tevfik Sırrı Gür Stadium, Mersin
Sunday, 12:00	Özgür Nasuh 11' (F); Bekir Hazar (yellow card) 48'; Özgür Nasuh (yellow card) 68'; Tufan Esin (yellow card) 73'	Report	46' (F) Oktay Kuday; 65' (H) Nezir Narin; (yellow card) 78' Murat Karakoç	Referee: Bülent Yıldırım

28 September 2003 Round 6	Dardanelspor	2 – 1	Mersin İdmanyurdu	18 Mart Stadium, Çanakkale
Sunday, 19:00	Mustafa Kocabey 35' (H); Mehmet Şen 86' (F); Mehmet Muttalip Kutun (yellow card) 32'; Mustafa Kocabey (yellow card) 42'; İlkem Özkaynak (yellow card) 68'; Emirhan Özdemir (yellow card) 87'; Erdal Akyürek (yellow card) 87'	Report	81' (H) Ali Kunter; (yellow card) 25' Ufuk Talay; (yellow card) 28' Tufan Esin; (yellow card) 87' Mustafa Sarp	Referee: Taner Balbay

5 October 2003 Round 7	Sakaryaspor	5 – 1	Mersin İdmanyurdu	Atatürk Stadium, Adapazarı, Sakarya
Sunday, 15:00	Burak Akdiş 22' (H); Abdulkadir Şakşak 31' (F); Murat Bölükbaş 46' (F); Fatih Ceylan 60' (H); Ragıp Başdağ 72' (F); Ragıp Başdağ (yellow card) 24'; Mesut Ünal (yellow card) 39'	Report	61' (F) Ali Kunter; (yellow card) 28' Özgür Yıldırım; (yellow card) 55' Ahmet Arslaner	Referee: Tolga Özkalfa

11 October 2003 Round 8	Mersin İdmanyurdu	4 – 0	Antalyaspor	Tevfik Sırrı Gür Stadium, Mersin
Saturday, 15:00	Taner Demirbaş 22' (pen.); Bekir Hazar 56' (F); Ali Kunter 77' (F); Taner Demirbaş 89' (F); Bekir Hazar (yellow card) 59'; Ufuk Talay (yellow card) 71'; Ali Kunter (yellow card) 75'; Taner Demirbaş (yellow card) 78'	Report	(yellow card) 26' Erol Kapusuz; (yellow card) 47' Osman Yeşilmeşe	Referee: Mehmet Fatih Gökçe

18 October 2003 Round 9	Göztepe	0 – 0	Mersin İdmanyurdu	Alsancak Stadium, İzmir
Saturday, 15:00	Serkan Reçber (yellow card) 31' (red card)	Report	(yellow card) 29' Ufuk Talay; (yellow card) 45' Ali Kunter; (yellow card) 47' Tufan Esin; (yellow card) 77' Altay Can	Referee: Sinan Baş

25 October 2003 Round 10	Mersin İdmanyurdu	0 – 3	Altay	Tevfik Sırrı Gür Stadium, Mersin
Saturday, 13:30	Taner Demirbaş (yellow card) 44'; Altay Can (yellow card) 51'	Report	24' (F) İbrahim Akın; 84' (H) Selim Çatalbaş; 85' (F) Selim Çatalbaş; (yellow card) 89' Murat Alaçayır	Referee: İsmet Cengiz

2 November 2003 Round 11	Kayserispor	4 – 2	Mersin İdmanyurdu	Atatürk Stadium, Kayseri
Sunday, 13:30	Mehmet Topuz 11' (F); Mutlu Kızıltan 41' (F); Mutlu Kızıltan 66' (F); Barış Bayram 67' (F); Levent Yılmaz (yellow card) 19'; Mutlu Kızıltan (yellow card) 53'; Barış Bayram (yellow card) 62'	Report	2' (F) Taner Demirbaş; 89' (F) Mustafa Sarp; (yellow card) 14' Ufuk Talay; (red card) 70' Hasan Gültang; (yellow card) 84' Ali Kunter	Referee: Muzaffer Akif Beyaz

8 November 2003 Round 12	Mersin İdmanyurdu	0 – 1	BŞB Ankaraspor	Tevfik Sırrı Gür Stadium, Mersin
Saturday, 13:30	Mustafa Sarp (yellow card) 10'; Taner Demirbaş (yellow card) 17'; Altay Can (yellow card) 61'; Ahmet Arslaner (yellow card) 80'	Report	12' (F) Erkan Traş; (yellow card) 8' Hürriyet Gücer; (yellow card) 78' Sinan Közeb; (yellow card) 89' Cem Hallaçeli	Referee: Cem Deda

15 November 2003 Round 13	Sivasspor	1 – 0	Mersin İdmanyurdu	4 Eylül Stadium, Sivas
Saturday, 13:30	Mehmet Yener 78' (F); Aydın Yıldırım (yellow card) 64'; Hüseyin Özcan (yellow card) 70'; Ali Tuna Tanyıldız (yellow card) 73'	Report	(yellow card) 31' Ufuk Talay; (yellow card) 53' Özgür Nasuh; (yellow card) 78' Savaş Göcen	Referee: Kemal Çakmak

23 November 2003 Round 14	Mersin İdmanyurdu	2 – 0	İstanbul BŞB	Tevfik Sırrı Gür Stadium, Mersin
Sunday, 13:30	Özgür Nasuh 14' (H); Taner Demirbaş 65' (F); Emre Koşağan (yellow card) 41'; Özgür Nasuh (yellow card) 42'; Ahmet Kolcu (yellow card) 55'; Tufan Esin (red card) 68'	Report	(yellow card) 52' İlhan Şahin	Referee: Zafer Demir

30 November 2003 Round 15	Kocaelispor	1 – 0	Mersin İdmanyurdu	İsmet Paşa Stadium, İzmit, Kocaeli
Sunday, 13:30	Engin Öztonga 77' (pen.); Mehmet Önür (yellow card) 37'; Mert Meriç (yellow card) 84'	Report	(yellow card) 50' Emre Eren	Referee: Süleyman Abay

6 December 2003 Round 16	Mersin İdmanyurdu	2 – 0	Adana Demirspor	Tevfik Sırrı Gür Stadium, Mersin
Saturday, 13:30	Ufuk Talay 71' (F); Özgür Nasuh 88' (F); Emre Eren (yellow card) 4'; İbrahim Halil Yiğit (yellow card) 38'; Özgür Nasuh (yellow card) 89'	Report	(yellow card) 19' Ali Yılmaz; (yellow card) 75' Mesut Akıncı	Referee: Yunus Yıldırım

13 December 2003 Round 17	İzmirspor	0 – 0	Mersin İdmanyurdu	Alsancak Stadium, İzmir
Saturday, 13:30	Çetin Kılıç (yellow card) 53'; Efe İnanç (yellow card) 65'; Rıfat Özdemir (yellow card) 69'; Serkan Silan (yellow card) 80'	Report	(yellow card) 18' İbrahim Halil Yiğit	Referee: Özgüç Türkalp

Sources: 2003–04 TFF First League pages.

=== Second half ===
Mersin İdmanyurdu (MİY) 2003–04 Second League Category A season second half game reports is shown in the following table. Kick off times are in EET and EEST.

In the half season, player Ahmet Arslaner (Elazığspor) left the team, Volkan Öztürk (Adanaspor) was transferred in.

25 January 2004 Round 18	Karşıyaka	4 – 3	Mersin İdmanyurdu	Alsancak Stadium, İzmir
Sunday, 13:30	Rasim Vardar 15' (F); Rasim Vardar 39' (F); Türker Demirkan 61' (F); Tufan Apaydın 74' (F); Ufuk Üçerler (yellow card) 66'; Türker Demirhan (yellow card) 83'; Rasim Vardar (yellow card) 90'	Report	27' (F) Taner Demirbaş; 30' (F) Taner Demirbaş; 82' (F) Ahmet Kolcu; (yellow card) 15' Ufuk Talay; (yellow card) 22' Mesut Akşit; (yellow card) 34' Mustafa Sarp; (yellow card) 81' Ahmet Kolcu; (yellow card) 85' Savaş Göcen	Referee: Mehmet Fatih Gökçe

1 February 2004 Round 19	Mersin İdmanyurdu	1 – 0	Kayseri Erciyesspor	Tevfik Sırrı Gür Stadium, Mersin
Sunday, 13:30	Taner Demirbaş 90' (F); Ufuk Talay (yellow card) 55'; Taner Demirbaş (yellow card) 64'	Report		Referee: Zafer Önder İpek

8 February 2004 Round 20	Yimpaş Yozgatspor	0 – 0	Mersin İdmanyurdu	Bozok Stadium, Yozgat
Sunday, 13:30	Selçuk Yıldırımkaya (yellow card) 27'	Report	(yellow card) 18' Bekir Hazar; (yellow card) 88' Tarkan Özyılmaz; (yellow card) 90' (red card) Ahmet Kolcu	Referee: Nihat Akman

14 February 2004 Round 21	Mersin İdmanyurdu	0 – 0	Türk Telekomspor	Tevfik Sırrı Gür Stadium, Mersin
Saturday, 13:30	Ufuk Talay (yellow card) 40'; Tufan Esin (yellow card) 61'	Report	(yellow card) 62' Burhan Coşkun; (yellow card) 75' (red card) Emre Güngör	Referee: Metin Aydoğan

21 February 2004 Round 22	Vestel Manisaspor	2 – 1	Mersin İdmanyurdu	19 Mayıs Stadium, Manisa
Saturday, 13:30	Coşkun Birdal 46' (F); Eray Er 86' (F); Bülent Ataman (yellow card) 30'; Coşkun Birdal (yellow card) 39'	Report	76' (F) Ufuk Talay; (yellow card) 34' Emre Eren; (yellow card) 58' Fuad Kınalı; (yellow card) 83' Taner Demirbaş; (yellow card) 86' Ufuk Talay; (yellow card) 89' Özgür Vurur	Referee: Hüseyin Göçek

28 February 2004 Round 23	Mersin İdmanyurdu	2 – 2	Dardanelspor	Tevfik Sırrı Gür Stadium, Mersin
Saturday, 13:30	Taner Demirbaş 31' (F); Taner Demirbaş 45' (F); Emre Eren (yellow card) 35'; Mustafa Sarp (yellow card) 69'; Taner Demirbaş (yellow card) 75'	Report	15' (F) Mehmet Çoğum; 55' (F) Mehmet Şen; (yellow card) 17' Osman Durmuş; (yellow card) 37' Aydın Tuna; (yellow card) 54' Mehmet Şen	Referee: Mustafa İlker Coşkun

7 March 2004 Round 24	Mersin İdmanyurdu	0 – 1	Sakaryaspor	Tevfik Sırrı Gür Stadium, Mersin
Sunday, 12:00	Özgür Nasuh (yellow card) 6'; Özgür Yıldırım (yellow card) 66'	Report	83' (F) Murat Bölükbaş	Referee: Hakan Sivriservi

14 March 2004 Round 25	Antalyaspor	2 – 1	Mersin İdmanyurdu	Atatürk Stadium, Antalya
Sunday, 13:30	Taner Gülleri 28' (F); Taner Gülleri 44' (H); Aydoğan Hacısalihoğlu (yellow card) 59'	Report	21' (F) Ufuk Talay; (yellow card) 50' Altay Can	Referee: Tolga Özkalfa

20 March 2004 Round 26	Mersin İdmanyurdu	4 – 0	Göztepe	Tevfik Sırrı Gür Stadium, Mersin
Saturday, 13:30	Özgür Nasuh 19' (H); Tufan Esin 62' (H); Taner Demirbaş 73' (F); Taner Demirbaş 89' (F); Özgür Nasuh (yellow card) 19'; Ufuk Talay (yellow card) 36'; İbrahim Halil Yiğit (yellow card) 47'; Fuad Kınalı (yellow card) 65'	Report		Referee: Bülent Yıldırım

27 March 2004 Round 27	Altay	1 – 1	Mersin İdmanyurdu	Alsancak Stadium, İzmir
Saturday, 13:30	Ümit İnal 83' (f); Serkan Kılıç (yellow card) 79'	Report	70' (F) Özgür Nasuh; (yellow card) 50' Mesut Akşit; (yellow card) 57' Ahmet Kolcu; (yellow card) 62' Ufuk Talay; (yellow card) 79' Mustafa Sarp; (yellow card) 90+2' Fuad Kınalı	Referee: Özgüç Türkalp

4 April 2014 Round 28	Mersin İdmanyurdu	0 – 1	Kayserispor	Tevfik Sırrı Gür Stadium, Mersin
Sunday, 14:30	İbrahim Halil Yiğit (yellow card) 40'; Özgür Nasuh (yellow card) 47'; Taner Demirbaş (yellow card) 72'	Report	12' (F) Mehmet Topuz; (yellow card) 16' Mehmet Zengin	Referee: Hakan Sivriservi

11 April 2004 Round 29	BŞB Ankaraspor	2 – 1	Mersin İdmanyurdu	Aktepe Stadium, Ankara
Sunday, 14:30	Cem Hallaçeli 42' (H); Uğur Boral 45' (F); Hüseyin Karnak (yellow card) 69'; Atilla Güneş (yellow card) 86'; Sinan Közen (yellow card) 90'	Report	70' (F) Savaş Göcen; (yellow card) 19' Özgür Vurur; (yellow card) 84' Fuad Kınalı	Referee: Orhan Erdemir

17 April 2004 Round 30	Mersin İdmanyurdu	4 – 0	Sivasspor	Tevfik Sırrı Gür Stadium, Mersin
Saturday, 14:30	Özgür Vurur 22' (F); Taner Demirbaş 66' (pen.); İbrahim Halil Yiğit 80' (F); Özgür Nasuh 83' (F); Özgür Nasuh (yellow card) 53'; Cemal Koç (yellow card) 89'	Report	(yellow card) 81' Majmut Hoşgiz	Referee: Yunus Yıldırım

25 April 2004 Round 31	İstanbul BŞB	0 – 2	Mersin İdmanyurdu	Ç. Emeç Stadium, B.paşa, Istanbul
Sunday, 14:30	Ruşen Duranoğlu 71' (o.g.); Okan Özke (yellow card) 37'; Hakan Tüfekçi (yellow card) 80'	Report	38' (pen.) Taner Demirbaş; (yellow card) 33' Mustafa Sarp	Referee: Serdar Tatlı

2 May 2004 Round 32	Mersin İdmanyurdu	0 – 1	Kocaelispor	Tevfik Sırrı Gür Stadium, Mersin
Sunday, 15:00	Özgür Vurur (yellow card) 28'; Tufan Esin (yellow card) 40' savaş Göcen (yellow card) 56'	Report	90' (F) Mehmet Önür; (yellow card) 36' Yüksel Sariyar; (yellow card) 77' Ömer Aysan Barış; (yellow card) 89' Mehmet Önür	Referee: Cem Deda

9 May 2004 Round 33	Adana Demirspor	1 – 1	Mersin İdmanyurdu	5 Ocak Stadium, Adana
Sunday, 15:00	Mustafa Diliçıkık 55' (F); Ercan Özbolat (yellow card) 9'; Murat Yüksel (yellow card) 46'; Mustafa Diliçıkık (yellow card) 55'; Mesut Akıncı (yellow card) 70'; Günal Akça (yellow card) 72'; Dursun Yeğen (yellow card) 84'; Murat Türksoy (yellow card) 89'	Report	89' (F) Tarkan Özyılmaz; (yellow card) 89' Mesut Akşit	Referee: Bülent Demirlek

16 May 2004 Round 34	Mersin İdmanyurdu	3 – 2	İzmirspor	Tevfik Sırrı Gür Stadium, Mersin
Sunday, 15:00	Taner Demirbaş 55' (F); Tufan Esin 60' (F); Taner Demirbaş 76' (H); Ufuk Talay (yellow card) 12'; Bekir Hazar (yellow card) 54'; Tarkan Özyılmaz (yellow card) 54'; Özgür Nasuh (yellow card) 62'; Cemal Koç (yellow card) 88'; İbrahim Halil Yiğit (yellow card) 89'	Report	52' (F) Efe İnanç; 71' (F) Yılmaz Şeker; (yellow card) 62' Çetin Kılıç; (yellow card) 89' Uğur Kara	Referee: Cüneyt Çakır

Sources: 2003–04 TFF First League pages.

== 2003–04 Turkish Cup participation ==
2003–04 Turkish Cup was played for 42nd time as Fortis Türkiye Kupası for sponsorship purposes. This season Cup was played by 48 teams in one-leg elimination system in 3 elimination rounds prior to quarter-finals. Trabzonspor won the cup for the 7th time. Mersin İdmanyurdu participated in the cup and eliminated at first elimination round.

=== Cup track ===
The drawings and results Mersin İdmanyurdu (MİY) followed in 2003–04 Turkish Cup are shown in the following table.

Round	Own League	Opponent's League	Opponent	A/H	Score	Result
Round 1	TFF First League	TFF Second League	Hatayspor	A	1–0	Promoted
Round 2	TFF First League	Süper Lig	Samsunspor	A	0–2	Eliminated

Note: In the above table 'Score' shows For and Against goals whether the match played at home or not.

=== Game details ===
Mersin İdmanyurdu (MİY) 2003–04 Turkish Cup game reports is shown in the following table. Kick off times are in EET and EEST.

12 November 2003 Round 1	Hatayspor	0 – 1 (a.e.t.)	Mersin İdmanyurdu	Atatürk Stadium, Antakya, Hatay
Wednesday, 13:00	Hakan Aydemir (yellow card) 21'; Haşim Ateş (yellow card) 70'; Yusuf Işık (yellow card) 88'; Erkan Akkoç (yellow card) 104' (red card)	Report	104' (F) Mustafa Sarp; (yellow card) post-match' Ahmet Kolcu	Referee: Nihat Akman

17 December 2003 Round 2	Samsunspor	2 – 0	Mersin İdmanyurdu	19 Mayıs Stadium, Samsun
Wednesday, 13:00	Juninho Cearense 45' (F); Serkan Aykut 59' (F)	Report	(yellow card) 59' Özgür Nasuh; (yellow card) 81' İbrahim Halil Yiğit	Referee: Cüneyt Elmaskeser

Source: 2003–04 Turkish Cup pages.

== Management ==
=== Club management ===
Macit Özcan, then mayor of Mersin city was president of the club.

=== Coaching team ===
Yücel İldiz was head coach at the start of the season. He took over the team in the mid of previous season. But, after 4th round he was replaced with Mehmet Şahan. In the mid-season Levent Eriş became the head coach. He coached the team until the end of the season.

2003–04 Mersin İdmanyurdu head coaches

Nat	Head coach	Period	Pl	W	D	L	Notes
(Turkey)	Yücel İldiz	12.08.2003 – 19.09.2003	4	1	0	3	Left after 4th round.
(Turkey)	Mehmet Şahan	19.09.2003 – 28.12.2003	15	4	2	9	Left after first half.
(Turkey)	Levent Eriş	30.01.2003 – 31.05.2003	17	5	5	7	Contract ended at the end of the season.

Note: Only official games were included.

== 2003–04 squad ==
Appearances, goals and cards count for 2003–04 Second League Category A and 2003–04 Turkish Cup games. 18 players appeared in each game roster, three to be replaced. Only the players who appeared in game rosters were included and listed in order of appearance.

O	N	Nat	Name	Birth	Born	Pos	LA	LG	CA	CG	TA	TG	Booked	Sent off (straight red)	← Season Notes →
1	1	(Turkey)	Hasan Gültang	29 Oct 1972	Adana	GK	24		1		25			1	2003 ST Kayserispor.
2	2	(Turkey)	Mesut Akşit	21 Apr 1982	Diyarbakır	DF	27		2		29		3		→ previous season.
3	3	(Turkey)	Tufan Esin	7 Aug 1980	Silifke	DF	30	2	2		32	2	5	1	→ previous season.
4	4	(Turkey)	Ahmet Arslaner	24 Dec 1970	Üsküdar	DF	17		2		19		3		2003 ST Kocaelispor.
5	5	(Turkey)	Mehmet Ali Honca	54 Mar 1971	Samsun	DF	3				3		2		2003 ST Adanaspor.
6	6	(Turkey)	Altay Can	17 Oct 1970	Kırcaali	MF	19		1		20		4		2003 ST Kayserispor.
7	7	(Turkey)	Savaş Göcen	30 Aug 1974	Istanbul	DF	30	1	2		32	1	4		→ previous season.
8	8	(Australia)	Ufuk Talay	26 Mar 1976	Sydney	MF	31	3	2		33	3	15		2003 ST Gaziantepspor.
9	9	(Turkey)	Özgür Nasuh	12 Jan 1978	Adana	MF	30	7	2		32	7	11		→ previous season.
10	10	(Turkey)	Taner Demirbaş	20 Nov 1978	Trabzon	FW	31	15	1		32	15	8		2003 ST Adana Demirspor.
11	11	(Turkey)	Ahmet Kolcu	1 Jan 1983	Mazgirt	FW	27	1	2		29	1	5	1	→ previous season.
12	12	(Turkey)	Özkan Karslı	1 May 1978	Adana	GK	5				5				2003 ST MKE Ankaragücü.
13	13	(Turkey)	Emre Eren	1 Dec 1976	Balıkesir	DF	14		1		15		6		→ previous season.
14	14	(Turkey)	Emre Koşağan	14 Nov 1976	Istanbul	DF	12		1		13		1		2003 ST Yıldırım Bosna.
15	15	(Turkey)	Bekir Hazar	27 Jul 1976	Ordu	MF	20	1			20	1	4		→ previous season.
16	16	(Turkey)	Halil Yiğit	20 Apr 1976	Mardin	FW	25	1	1		26	1	6		→ previous season.
17	17	(Turkey)	Mustafa Sarp	5 Nov 1980	Bakırköy	MF	28	1	2	1	30	2	8		→ previous season.
18	18	(Turkey)	Ali Kunter	3 Aug 1978	Ankara	FW	16	3	2		18	3	4		2003 ST A. Sebatspor.
19	12	(Turkey)	Ömür Özünal	11 May 1982	Adana	GK	1		1		2				→ previous season.
20	16	(Turkey)	Özgür Yıldırım	1 May 1981	Mersin	MF	11		2		13		2		2003 ST Yıldırım Bosna.
21	18	(Turkey)	Ersen Turunç	25 May 1978	Samandağ	FW									2003 ST Kilis Belediyespor.
22	14	(Turkey)	Fatih Çakmak	5 Feb 1984	Of	DF	2		1		3				First time professional.
23	18	(Turkey)	İbrahim Özdemir	29 Aug 1985	Karataş	MF									First time professional.
24	15	(Turkey)	Fatih Şaşmaz	5 Mar 1985	Pozantı	DF	1				1				First time professional.
25	18	(Turkey)	Nurullah Kaya	20 Jul 1986	Batman	MF									First time professional.
26	17	(Turkey)	Sabit Aycıl	15 Aug 1985	Mersin	FW									First time professional.
27	4	(Turkey)	Fuad Kınalı	18 Apr 1975	Neuss	DF	15				15		4		2004 WT Adana Demirspor.
28	5	(Turkey)	Özgür Vurur	13 Jan 1976	Ankara	MF	17	1			17	1	3		2004 WT Çaykur Rizespor.
29	12	(Turkey)	Orhan Altay	1 May 1978	Silifke	GK	6				6				2004 WT Kayserispor.
30	13	(Turkey)	Tarkan Özyılmaz	3 Apr 1975	Mersin	MF	7	1			7	1	2		2004 WT Zonguldakspor.
31	18	(Turkey)	Volkan Öztürk	10 Feb 1979	Adana	MF	5				5				2004 WT Adanaspor.
32	17	(Turkey)	Sezar Güner	7 Nov 1972	Rize	FW	11				11				2004 WT Aydınspor.
33	16	(Turkey)	Cemal Koç	5 Mar 1977	Mersin	MF	6				6		2		2004 WT Adana Demirspor.
34	14	(Turkey)	Sezgin Altınok	18 May 1978	İzmir	MF									2004 WT İzmirspor.
35	14	(Turkey)	Levent Şeker	6 Jan 1985	Mersin	FW	2				2				→ previous season.

Sources: TFF club page and maçkolik team page.

== See also ==
- Football in Turkey
- 2003–04 TFF First League
- 2003–04 Turkish Cup
