= 2001–02 Mersin İdmanyurdu season =

Mersin İdmanyurdu
2001–02 season
- President: Macit Özcan (since 19 April 1999)
- Head coach: Levent Arıkdoğan (till 18 October 2000) unknown (till 31 May 2001)
- Stadium: Tevfik Sırrı Gür Stadium; Mersin, Turkey
- TFF Second League: Ranking Group 1: 1st Promotion Group: 2nd
- Turkish Cup: Did not participate
- Top goalscorer: League: Burak Bayman (19); All: Burak Bayman (19)

Mersin İdmanyurdu (also Mersin İdman Yurdu, Mersin İY, or MİY) Sports Club; located in Mersin, east Mediterranean coast of Turkey in 2001–02. It was the first season in Turkish football league system that a single group second division was introduced with name of Second League Category A. The continuation of Turkish Second Football League was renamed as Second League Category B which was lowered to third layer accordingly. The team took place in first season of this division for the first time, and in Second League for 28th time since its foundation in 1963–64. Mersin İdmanyurdu S.K. has finished Second League Category B Promotion Group at second place in 2001–02 season and promoted to 2002–03 TFF First League.

Macit Özcan was club president. Nasır Belci managed the team during the season. Şafak Burak Bayman was the mostly appeared player as well as season top goalscorer.

== 2001–02 TFF Second League participation ==
Mersin İdmanyurdu took place in 2001–02 Second League Category B (which has been named as "Second League Category B" between 2001–02 and 2005–06; "TFF League B" in 2006–07 and "TFF Second League" since 2007–08 season). League was played by 50 teams in three stages. League was started on 19 August 2001. In the first stage teams fought in regionally specified five ranking groups (10 teams in each) for top two rankings to qualify for Promotion Group in the next stage. In the second stage 10 teams fought for promotion to 2002–03 Second League Category A. Champions and runners-up directly promoted. Remaining 8 teams played in Classification Groups. Classification group winners qualified for promotion play-offs, while bottom two teams relegated to 2002–03 TFF Third League. In the third stage, the third team was determined in promotion-play-offs played in one-leg elimination system in a neutral venue. Play-offs were played by 8 teams (three from promotion group, 5 from each classification groups) in Denizli Atatürk Stadium between 22 and 27 May 2002.

Mersin İdmanyurdu took place in 2001–02 Second League Category B Ranking Group 1 in the first stage and finished at top. In Promotion Group team finished at second place and gained direct promotion to 2002–03 Second League Category A.

=== Results summary ===
Mersin İdmanyurdu (MİY) 2001–02 Second League Category B season league summary:

	Overall									Home								Away							
Stage	Pc	Pl	W	D	L	GF	GA	GD	Pt	Pl	W	D	L	GF	GA	GD	Pt	Pl	W	D	L	GF	GA	GD	Pt
Ranking Group	1	18	10	5	3	34	19	+15	35	9	7	2	0	23	5	+18	23	9	3	3	3	11	14	-3	12
Promotion Group	2	18	9	5	4	17	12	+5	32	9	6	2	1	11	3	+8	20	9	3	3	3	6	9	-3	12
Overall		36	19	10	7	51	31	+20	67	18	13	4	1	34	8	+26	43	18	6	6	6	17	23	-6	24

Sources: 2001–02 TFF Second League pages.

=== Ranking group league table ===
Mersin İY's league performance in 2001–02 Second League Category B Ranking Group 1 season is shown in the following table.

Pc	Team	Games				Goals		Pts	Home			Away		
Pc	Team	Pl	W	D	L	F	A	Pts	F–A	R	Pc	F–A	R	Pc
1	Mersin İdmanyurdu (Q)	18	10	5	3	34	19	35						
2	Gaziantep Büyükşehir Belediyespor (Q)	18	9	5	4	35	17	32	1–0	15	1	3–2	6	1
3	Kartalspor	18	9	5	4	32	18	32	3–1	13	1	3–1	4	1
4	Eskişehirspor	18	8	6	4	22	20	30	1–1	1	6	0–1	10	2
5	Yıldırım Bosnaspor	18	5	8	5	28	25	23	2–0	8	1	0–4	17	1
6	Mezitlispor	18	6	4	8	28	32	22	4–1	3	2	1–1	12	1
7	Maltepespor	18	5	6	7	29	35	21	3–1	18	1	1–1	9	1
8	Küçükköyspor	18	4	6	8	25	40	18	7–0	7	1	0–3	16	1
9	Sapancaspor	18	3	7	8	17	30	16	0–0	5	3	2–0	14	1
10	Zeytinburnuspor	18	3	4	11	20	34	13	2–1	11	1	1–1	2	5

Three points for a win. Rules for classification: 1) points; 2) tie-break; 3) goal difference; 4) number of goals scored. In the score columns first scores belong to MİY.
(Q): Qualified for 2001–02 Second League Promotion Group.
Source: 2001–02 TFF Second League pages from TFF website, Turkish-Soccer website, and Maçkolik website.

=== Ranking group games ===
Mersin İdmanyurdu (MİY) 2001–02 Second League Category B season first half game reports in Ranking Group 1 is shown in the following table. Kick off times are in EET and EEST.

19 August 2001 Round 1	Mersin İdmanyurdu	1–1	Eskişehirspor	Tevfik Sırrı Gür Stadium, Mersin
Sunday, 17:00	Şafak Burak Bayman 40' (F); Tufan Esin (yellow card) 89'	Report	20' (F) Murat Şengül; (yellow card) 6' Yasin Avcıoğlu; (yellow card) 54' Murat Şengül; (yellow card) 74' Özkan Şenol; (yellow card) 89' Serkan Şahin	Referee: Bünyamin Gezer

26 August 2001 Round 2	Zeytinburnuspor	1–1	Mersin İdmanyurdu	Z.burnu Stadium, Z.burnu, Istanbul
Sunday, 17:00	Mehmet Fatih Çayla 82' (F); Bülent Etriyatik (yellow card) 41'	Report	88' (F) Şafak Burak Bayman; (yellow card) 76' İbrahim Halil Yiğit; (yellow card) 89' Mehmet Görkem Sevim	Referee: Mehmet Çağlayan Kökkılınç

2 September 2001 Round 3	Mersin İdmanyurdu	4–1	Mezitlispor	Tevfik Sırrı Gür Stadium, Mersin
Sunday, 16:00	İbrahim Halil Yiğit 10' (F); İbrahim Halil Yiğit 31' (F); Şafak Burak Bayman 68' (F); Mehmet Görkem Sevim 76' (F); Murat Akay (yellow card) 41'	Report	33' (F) Günay Bahçe	Referee: Numan Polat

9 September 2001 Round 4	Kartalspor	1–3	Mersin İdmanyurdu	Kartal Stadium, Kartal, Istanbul
Sunday, 16:30	Mustafa Çalışkan 9' (o.g.); İlkay Margılıçlı 50' (F); Tolga Öztürk (yellow card) 80'	Report	7' (F) Tarkan Özyılmaz; 68' (H) Sezgin Altınok; (yellow card) 52' Ahmet Kolcu	Referee: Aytekin Durmaz

16 September 2001 Round 5	Mersin İdmanyurdu	0–0	Sapancaspor	Tevfik Sırrı Gür Stadium, Mersin
Sunday, 16:00	Tahir Alegöz (yellow card) 47'; Cüneyt Yenişehir (yellow card) 83'	Report	(yellow card) 45' Aydın Kahraman	Referee: Yıldıray Arslan

23 September 2001 Round 6	Gaziantep BŞB	2–3	Mersin İdmanyurdu	Kamil Ocak Stadium, Gaziantep
Sunday, 16:00	Zafer Tangör 54' (F); Atilla Çalım 87' (H); Remzi Kızılşimşek (yellow card) 35'; Ali Borazan (yellow card) 59'	Report	23' (F) Şafak Burak Bayman; 26' (H) Zeynel Abidin Oktay; 51' (F) Zeynel Abidin Oktay; (yellow card) 87' İbrahim Halil Yiğit	Referee: Selçuk Yılmaz

30 September 2001 Round 7	Mersin İdmanyurdu	7–0	Küçükköyspor	Tevfik Sırrı Gür Stadium, Mersin
Sunday, 15:00	Şafak Burak Bayman 2' (F); Zeynel Abidin Oktay 25' (F); Tarkan Özyılmaz 43' (F); Zeynel Abidin Oktay 58' (F); Şafak Burak Bayman 59' (F); Şafak Burak Bayman 83' (F); Ahmet Kolcu 90' (F)	Report		Referee: Adnan Özer

7 October 2001 Round 8	Mersin İdmanyurdu	2–0	Yıldırım Bosnaspor	Tevfik Sırrı Gür Stadium, Mersin
Sunday, 15:00	Şafak Burak Bayman 6' (F); Cüneyt Yenişehir 88' (F); Mehmet Görkem Sevim (yellow card) 83'	Report	(yellow card) 19' Adem Gezici	Referee: Hakan Sivriservi

14 October 2001 Round 9	Maltepespor	1–1	Mersin İdmanyurdu	H. Polat Stadium, Maltepe, Istanbul
Sunday, 15:30	Gökmen Ağbulak 40' (F); Yahya Onur Tekinceer (yellow card) 43'; Ramazan Sancak (yellow card) 88' (red card)	Report	78' (H) Şafak Burak Bayman; (yellow card) 47' Sezgin Altınok; (yellow card) 87' Tahir Alegöz	Referee: Elsan Sungur

21 October 2001 Round 10	Eskişehirspor	1–0	Mersin İdmanyurdu	Atatürk Stadium, Eskişehir
Sunday, 15:00	Murat Şengül 62' (F); Yasin Avcıoğlu (yellow card) 38'; Yücel Yüce (yellow card) 81'	Report	(yellow card) 16' Ahmet Kolcu; (yellow card) 27' Şafak Burak Bayman; (yellow card) 89' Osman Özbek	Referee: Coşkun Özkara

28 October 2001 Round 11	Mersin İdmanyurdu	2–1	Zeytinburnuspor	Tevfik Sırrı Gür Stadium, Mersin
Sunday, 13:30	Şafak Burak Bayman 55' (pen.); Tarkan Özyılmaz 86' (F); Mesut Akşit (yellow card) 47'	Report	67' (F) Serkan Reçber; (yellow card) 53' İbrahim Bilgin; (yellow card) 69' Özgür Çayır; (yellow card) 82' Erman İzci	Referee: Oğuz Uğurlu

4 November 2001 Round 12	Mezitlispor	1–1	Mersin İdmanyurdu	Tevfik Sırrı Gür Stadium, Mersin
Sunday, 13:30	Ramazan Bozdağ 53' (pen.); Ökkeş Uğur Güneş (yellow card) 27'; Hüseyin Uğur Şaş (yellow card) 38'; Zeki Özer (yellow card) 70' (red card); Aykut Alkan (yellow card) 82' (red card); Selman Kaplan (yellow card) 88'	Report	36' (H) Şafak Burak Bayman	Referee: Muzaffer Akif Beyaz

11 November 2001 Round 13	Mersin İdmanyurdu	3–1	Kartalspor	Tevfik Sırrı Gür Stadium, Mersin
Sunday, 13:30	Şafak Burak Bayman 27' (F); Tarkan Özyılmaz 60' (F); Şafak Burak Bayman 80' (F); Mesut Akşit (yellow card) 5'; Sezgin Altınok (yellow card) 25'; Ahmet Kolcu (yellow card) 51'; Tahir Alegöz (yellow card) 75'	Report	52' (F) Ensar Hacımustafaoğlu; (yellow card) 42' Kerem Barut; (yellow card) 43' Kadir Ömeroğlu; (yellow card) 55' Oktay Demir; (yellow card) 70' Alper Telli	Referee: Özgüç Türkalp

18 November 2001 Round 14	Sapancaspor	0–2	Mersin İdmanyurdu	Atatürk Stadium, Sapanca, Sakarya
Sunday, 13:30	Kasım Çıkla (yellow card) 75'; Murat Karaömer (yellow card) 77'; Serdar Gökalp (yellow card) 88'	Report	51' (F) Tarkan Özyılmaz; 59' (F) Tarkan Özyılmaz	Referee: Yunus Yıldırım

25 November 2001 Round 15	Mersin İdmanyurdu	1–0	Gaziantep BŞB	Tevfik Sırrı Gür Stadium, Mersin
Sunday, 13:30	Şafak Burak Bayman 61' (pen.); Emre Koşağan (yellow card) 30'; Mesut Akşit (yellow card) 66'; Mehmet Görkem Sevim (yellow card) 77'	Report	(yellow card) 55' (red card) Seydi Çil; (yellow card) 62' Süleyman Varlık; (yellow card) 62' Zafer Tangör; (yellow card) 75' Erdal Güneş	Referee: Bünyamin Gezer

2 December 2001 Round 16	Küçükköyspor	3–0	Mersin İdmanyurdu	Küçükköy Stadium, G.o.paşa, Istanbul
Sunday, 13:30	Ecevit Yıldırım 6' (F); Osman Kalkan 35' (F); Erbil Aktepe 48' (F); Osman Kalkan (yellow card) 65'	Report	(yellow card) 82' Tarkan Özyılmaz	Referee: Aytekin Durmaz

9 December 2001 Round 17	Yıldırım Bosnaspor	4–0	Mersin İdmanyurdu	Ç. Emeç Stadium, B.paşa, Istanbul
Sunday, 13:30	Ömer Hacısalihoğlu 2' (F); Baha Çörüz 34' (pen.); Ömer Hacısalihoğlu 37' (F); Baha Çörüz 75' (F); Mert Bayrak (yellow card) 8'	Report	(yellow card) 8' Şafak Burak Bayman; (red card) 34' Emre Koşağan; (yellow card) 61' İbrahim Halil Yiğit; (yellow card) 70' Ahmet Kolcu; (yellow card) 73' Tahir Alegöz; (yellow card) 79' Mehmet Görkem Sevim; (yellow card) 80' Mesut Akşit	Referee: Ümit Ünal

16 December 2001 Round 18	Mersin İdmanyurdu	3–1	Maltepespor	Tevfik Sırrı Gür Stadium, Mersin
Sunday, 13:30	Zeynel Abidin Oktay 58' (F); Zeynel Abidin Oktay 60' (F); Tarkan Özyılmaz 87' (F); Sezgin Altınok (yellow card) 13'; Hidayet Levent Şeker (yellow card) 80'; İbrahim Halil Yiğit (yellow card) 89'	Report	75' (F) Erkan Karahan; (yellow card) 36' Emrah Tepe; (yellow card) 88' Yalçın Bayrak	Referee: Mustafa Kamil Abitoğlu

Sources: 2001–02 TFF Second League pages.

=== Promotion group league table ===
Mersin İY's league performance in 2001–02 Second League Category B Promotion Group season is shown in the following table.

Pc	Team	Games				Goals		Pts	Home			Away		
Pc	Team	Pl	W	D	L	F	A	Pts	F–A	R	Pc	F–A	R	Pc
1	Vestel Manisaspor (C) (P)	18	14	3	1	33	13	45	0–0	3	7	0–3	12	3
2	Mersin İdmanyurdu (P)	18	9	5	4	17	12	32						
3	Darıca Gençlerbirliği (Q)	18	8	5	5	29	24	29	1–0	18	2	0–1	9	3
4	Türk Telekomspor (Q)	18	7	4	7	25	24	25	2–1	13	3	1–0	4	5
5	Şanlıurfaspor (Q)	18	6	6	6	24	24	24	0–0	1	7	2–2	10	7
6	Antalya Kepezpor	18	5	8	5	21	15	23	0–1	8	11	0–3	17	3
7	Gaziosmanpaşaspor	18	6	5	7	23	23	23	4–0	11	3	0–0	2	7
8	Gaziantep Büyükşehir Belediyespor	18	5	4	9	23	33	19	1–0	15	3	1–0	6	1
9	Çankırı Belediyespor	18	3	5	10	15	27	14	1–0	16	2	1–0	7	1
10	Erzincanspor	18	2	5	11	10	25	11	2–0	5	3	1–1	14	1

Three points for a win. Rules for classification: 1) points; 2) tie-break; 3) goal difference; 4) number of goals scored. In the score columns first scores belong to MİY.
(C): Champions; (P): Promoted to 2002–03 Second League Category A; (Q): Qualified for 2001–02 Promotion Play-offs.
Source: 2001–02 TFF Second League pages from TFF website, Turkish-Soccer website, and Maçkolik website.

=== Promotion group games ===
Mersin İdmanyurdu (MİY) 2001–02 Second League Category B season first half game reports in Promotion Group is shown in the following table. Kick off times are in EET and EEST.

20 January 2002 Round 1	Mersin İdmanyurdu	0–0	Şanlıurfaspor	Tevfik Sırrı Gür Stadium, Mersin
Sunday, 13:30	Tahir Alegöz (yellow card) 42'	Report	(yellow card) 30' Cengiz Çelebi; (yellow card) 36' Tanser Aydın	Referee: Metin Karaslan

27 January 2002 Round 2	Gaziosmanpaşaspor	0–0	Mersin İdmanyurdu	GOP Stadium, G.o.paşa, Istanbul
Sunday, 13:30	Fevzi Layiç (yellow card) 60'	Report	(yellow card) 58' Tufan Esin; (yellow card) 89' Tahir Alegöz	Referee: Ömer Faruk Özkan

3 February 2002 Round 3	Mersin İdmanyurdu	0–0	Vestel Manisaspor	Tevfik Sırrı Gür Stadium, Mersin
Sunday, 13:30	Tahir Alegöz (yellow card) 86'	Report	(yellow card) 50' Mehmet Yıldız; (yellow card) 69' Yücel Çabuk; (yellow card) 75' Abdullah Boz	Referee: Ziya Fidan

9 February 2002 Round 4	Türk Telekomspor	0–1	Mersin İdmanyurdu	Macunköy Stadium, Ankara
Saturday, 13:30	Serdar Aydın (yellow card) 50'	Report	75' (F) Şafak Burak Bayman; (yellow card) 32' Tufan Esin; (yellow card) 66' Tarkan Özyılmaz	Referee: Ömer Soysal

17 February 2002 Round 5	Mersin İdmanyurdu	2–0	Erzincanspor	Tevfik Sırrı Gür Stadium, Mersin
Sunday, 13:30	Şafak Burak Bayman 55' (H); Şafak Burak Bayman 86' (F); Emre Koşağan (yellow card) 72'	Report		Referee: Metin Toker

24 February 2002 Round 6	Gaziantep BŞB	0–1	Mersin İdmanyurdu	Kamil Ocak Stadium, Gaziantep
13:30	Onur İçli (yellow card) 38'; Mustafa Ümit Temel (yellow card) 89'	Report	48' (F) İbrahim Halil Yiğit; (yellow card) 48' Tarkan Özyılmaz	Referee: Kemal Çakmak

3 March 2002 Round 7	Çankırı Belediyespor	0–1	Mersin İdmanyurdu	Atatürk Stadium, Çankırı
Sunday, 13:30	İbrahim Kuduban (yellow card) 5'; Uğur Çelik (yellow card) 51'; Murat Pekatik (yellow card) 66'	Report	65' (F) Ahmet Kolcu; (yellow card) 55' Mehmet Görkem Sevim; (yellow card) 78' Sezgin Altınok	Referee: Cafer Kuştepe

10 March 2002 Round 8	Mersin İdmanyurdu	0–1	Antalya Kepezspor	Tevfik Sırrı Gür Stadium, Mersin
Sunday, 13:30		Report	59' (F) Mahmut Karıklar; (yellow card) 68' Hakan Çalışkan; (yellow card) 78' Mehmet Fatih Günen	Referee: Kemal Çakmak

17 March 2002 Round 9	Darıca Gençlerbirliği	1–0	Mersin İdmanyurdu	City Stadium, Darıca, Kocaeli
Sunday, 13:30	Hasan Altıparmak 60' (H); Bilal Murat Demir (yellow card) 51'	Report	(yellow card) 35' Mehmet Görkem Sevim	Referee: Yüksel Altuntaş

24 March 2002 Round 10	Şanlıurfaspor	2–2	Mersin İdmanyurdu	11 Nisan Stadium, Şanlıurfa
Sunday, 14:30	Hüseyin Özcan 46' (F); Serdar Uçgan 64' (F); Hasan Felhan (yellow card) 51'; İhsan Öksüz (yellow card) 66'; Hüseyin Özcan (yellow card) 75'; Serdar Uçgan (yellow card) 78'	Report	30' (H) Zeynel Abidin Oktay; 54' (F) Osman Özbek; (yellow card) 71' Sezgin Altınok; (yellow card) 79' Oğuzhan Doğar	Referee: Nihat Akman

31 March 2002 Round 11	Mersin İdmanyurdu	4–0	Gaziosmanpaşaspor	Tevfik Sırrı Gür Stadium, Mersin
Sunday, 14:30	Emre Koşağan 11' (F); Mesut Akşit 25' (F); Zeynel Abidin Oktay 30' (F); Şafak Burak Bayman 68' (F); Mesut Akşit (yellow card) 13'; Salim Çömert (yellow card) 72'; Sezgin Altınok (yellow card) 90'	Report	(yellow card) 2' Canel Çalışkan	Referee: Remzi Sönmez

7 April 2002 Round 12	Vestel Manisaspor	3–0	Mersin İdmanyurdu	19 Mayıs Stadium, Manisa
Sunday, 14:30	Deniz Kibar 16' (H); Salih Yıldız 73' (F); Abdullah Boz 90' (F); Taner Taşkın (yellow card) 69'; Kenan Aslanoğlu (yellow card) 80'	Report		Referee: Mustafa Kamil Abitoğlu

14 April 2002 Round 13	Mersin İdmanyurdu	2–1	Türk Telekomspor	Tevfik Sırrı Gür Stadium, Mersin
Sunday, 14:30	Tahir Alegöz 59' (pen.); Şafak Burak Bayman 62' (H); Ahmet Kolcu (yellow card) 61'; Sezgin Altınok (yellow card) 89'	Report	48' (F) Hakan Genç; (yellow card) 45' Orhan Kayhan; (yellow card) 54' Umut Çakır	Referee: Yıldıray Arslan

21 April 2002 Round 14	Erzincanspor	1–1	Mersin İdmanyurdu	13 Şubat Stadium, Erzincan
Sunday, 14:30	Erkan Demirel 70' (F); Hakan Tan (yellow card) 37'; Tuncay Meral (yellow card) 76'	Report	82' (F) Tarkan Özyılmaz; (yellow card) 34' Mehmet Görkem Sevim; (yellow card) 68' Tahir Alegöz; (yellow card) 82' Ahmet Kolcu	Referee: Namık Karaman

28 April 2002 Round 15	Mersin İdmanyurdu	1–0	Gaziantep BŞB	Tevfik Sırrı Gür Stadium, Mersin
Sunday, 15:30	Tarkan Özyılmaz 32' (F); Sezgin Altınok (yellow card) 34'	Report	(yellow card) 40' Doğan Çengel; (yellow card) 44' Mustafa Ümit Temel; (yellow card) 71' Ali Denli; (red card) 89' Süleyman Varlık	Referee: Murat Şentürk

5 May 2002 Round 16	Mersin İdmanyurdu	1–0	Çankırı Belediyespor	Tevfik Sırrı Gür Stadium, Mersin
Sunday, 15:30	Tarkan Özyılmaz 15' (F); Mesut Akşit (yellow card) 42'; Oğuzhan Doğar (yellow card) 88'	Report	(yellow card) 43' Selçuk Karakaya; (yellow card) 45' İbrahim Kuduban; (yellow card) 61' Engin Sertel; (yellow card) 70' Onur Alper Yaman; (yellow card) 75' Bekir Hazar; (yellow card) 78' Mehmet Osanmaz	Referee: Bülent Yıldırım

12 May 2002 Round 17	Antalya Kepezspor	3–0	Mersin İdmanyurdu	Uğur Sorguç Stadium, Antalya
Sunday, 15:30	Mehmet Eren Boyraz 25' (F); Tarık Akın 30' (F); Mehmet Eren Boyraz 69' (F); Muharrem Göktuğ Güven (yellow card) 31'; Mehmet Navruz (yellow card) 32'; Tarık Akın (yellow card) 32'; Hakan Çalışkan (yellow card) 89'; Hakan Çakır (yellow card) 90'	Report	(yellow card) 32' Tahir Alegöz; (yellow card) 66' Şafak Burak Bayman	Referee: Hüseyin Sungur

18 May 2002 Round 18	Mersin İdmanyurdu	1–0	Darıca Gençlerbirliği	Tevfik Sırrı Gür Stadium, Mersin
Saturday, 15:30	Tahir Alegöz 90+2' (H); Emre Koşağan (yellow card) 30'; Osman Özbek (yellow card) 87'; Oğuzhan Doğar (yellow card) 89'; Tarkan Özyılmaz (yellow card) 90'	Report	(yellow card) 50' Fadıl Koşutan; (yellow card) 75' Yaşar Aydın; (yellow card) 89' Ferdi Aksakal	Referee: Çetin Sarıgül

Sources: 2001–02 TFF Second League pages.

== 2001–02 Turkish Cup participation ==
MİY did not participate in 2001–02 Turkish Cup due to eligibility rules. 40th Turkish Cup (played as "Türkiye Kupası") was played by 64 teams. Top four teams in previous year's classification groups qualified for the Cup from Round 1. Mersin İdmanyurdu had finished 2000–01 in 7th place and did not qualify. Cup was played in 4 rounds prior to quarterfinals. All rounds were played in one-leg elimination system. Kocaelispor won the cup for the 2nd time.

== Management ==
=== Club management ===
Macit Özcan, mayor of Mersin city was president. Özcan was elected president in club congress after 18 April 1999 local elections. Mayors presided the club many times in its history.

=== Coaching team ===
Nasır Belci was head coach during the season.

2000–01 Mersin İdmanyurdu head coaches:

Nat	Head coach	Period	Pl	W	D	L	Notes
(Turkey)	Nasır Belci	06.07.2001 – 31.05.2002	36	19	10	7	Continued in the next season.

Note: Only official games were included.

== 2001–02 squad ==
Appearances, goals and cards count for 2001–02 Second League Category B Ranking and Promotion Groups games. 18 players appeared in each game roster, three to be replaced. Only the players who appeared in game rosters were included and listed in order of appearance.

O	N	Nat	Name	Birth	Born	Pos	LA	LG	CA	CG	TA	TG	Booked	Sent off (straight red)	← Season Notes →
1	1	(Turkey)	Serkan Erbay	25 Aug 1978	Kırklareli	GK	5				5				→ previous season.
2	2	(Turkey)	Sezgin Altınok	18 May 1978	İzmir	DF	31				31		8		2001 ST Göztepe.
3	3	(Turkey)	Tahir Alegöz	24 Jul 1971	Sivas	DF	34	2			34	2	9		2001 ST Bursaspor.
4	4	(Turkey)	Murat Akay	19 Jul 1976	Mersin	DF	16				16		1		→ previous season.
5	5	(Turkey)	Tufan Esin	7 Aug 1980	Silifke	DF	32				32		3		2001 ST Silifkespor.
6	6	(Turkey)	Mesut Akşit	21 Apr 1982	Diyarbakır	DF	35	1			35	1	6		2001 ST Silifkespor.
7	7	(Turkey)	Osman Özbek	3 Aug 1980	Tarsus	MF	28	1			28	1	2		→ previous season.
8	8	(Turkey)	Halil Yiğit	20 Apr 1976	Mardin	FW	35	3			35	3	4		→ previous season.
9	9	(Turkey)	Abidin Oktay	12 Aug 1976	Mardin	FW	32	8			32	8			→ previous season.
10	10	(Turkey)	Görkem Sevim	6 Jun 1978	Muğla	MF	34	1			34	1	7		2001 ST İzmirspor.
11	11	(Turkey)	Burak Bayman	10 Jun 1977	Siirt	FW	36	19			36	19	3		2001 ST Zeytinburnu.
12	12	(Turkey)	Oğuzhan Doğar	1 Jun 1978	Osmaniye	GK	32				32		3		→ previous season.
13	13	(Turkey)	Emre Koşağan	14 Nov 1976	Istanbul	MF	34	1			34	1	3	1	→ previous season.
14	14	(Turkey)	Tarkan Özyılmaz	3 Apr 1975	Mersin	MF	34	10			34	10	4		→ previous season.
15	15	(Turkey)	Cüneyt Yenişehir	9 Jan 1976	İzmir	MF	16	1			16	1	1		→ previous season.
16	16	(Turkey)	İbrahim Metli	26 Oct 1981	Mersin	FW	5				5				→ previous season.
17	17	(Turkey)	Ahmet Kolcu	1 Jan 1983	Mazgirt	FW	33	2			33	2	6		→ previous season.
18	18	(Turkey)	Volkan Gündüz	6 Mar 1979	İzmir	MF	3				3				2001 ST İzmirspor.
19	17	(Turkey)	Salim Çömert	1 Jan 1982	Mersin	FW	10				10		1		First time professional.
20	18	(Turkey)	Taylan Eliaçık	27 May 1984	Malatya	FW	3				3				→ previous season.
21	15	(Turkey)	Gökhan Yıldız	22 Aug 1982	Gölbaşı	DF									First time professional.
22	14	(Turkey)	İlker Terlemez	4 Sep 1983	Şiran	FW	1				1				First time professional.
23	15	(Turkey)	Maşallah Ertav	1 Jan 1985	Güroymak	DF									Amateur player.
24	16	(Turkey)	Levent Şeker	6 Jan 1985	Mersin	FW	1				1		1		Amateur player.
25	18	(Turkey)	Fatih Çakmak	5 Feb 1984	Of	DF									Amateur player.
26	18	(Turkey)	Alpaslan Kartal	23 Jun 1977	Sakarya	DF	7				7				2002 WL Diyarbakırspor.
27	18	(Turkey)	Levent Eliballı	8 Jun 1982	Mersin	MF									→ previous season.

Sources: TFF club page and maçkolik team page.

== See also ==
- Football in Turkey
- 2001–02 TFF Second League
- 2001–02 Turkish Cup
