= Gökhan Ünal =

Turkish footballer

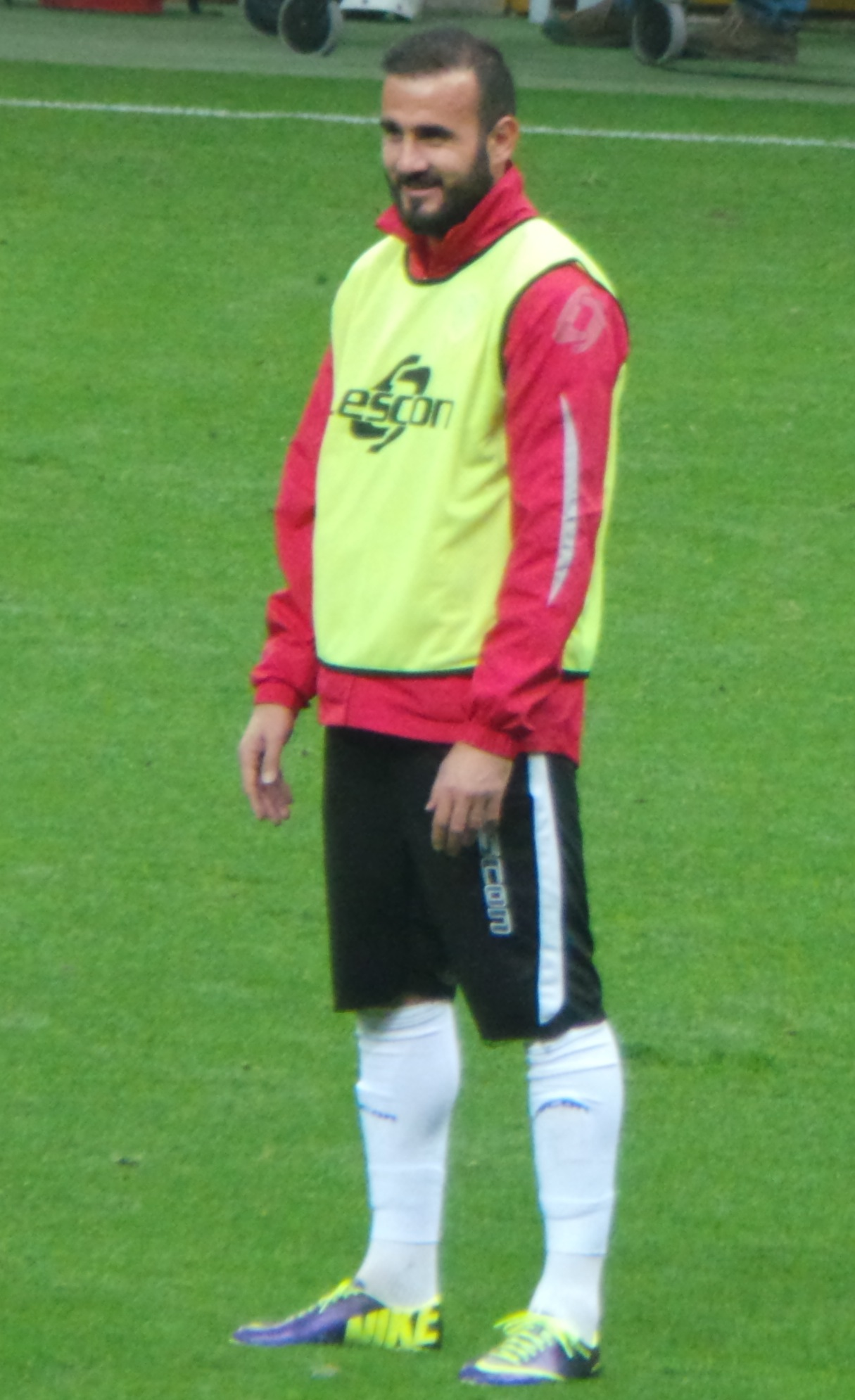
- Ünal playing for Balıkesirspor

Personal information
- Date of birth: 23 July 1982 (age 44)
- Place of birth: Ankara, Turkey
- Height: 1.84 m (6 ft 0 in)
- Position: Striker

Youth career
- 1997–1999: Petrol Ofisi Spor

Senior career*
Years	Team	Apps	(Gls)
1999–2003	Gençlerbirliği	15	(3)
2001	→ Hacettepe (loan)	14	(10)
2002	→ Ankaraspor (loan)	14	(1)
2002–2003	→ Yozgatspor (loan)	17	(3)
2003–2008	Kayserispor	112	(60)
2008–2010	Trabzonspor	45	(17)
2010–2012	Fenerbahçe	13	(2)
2011	→ Istanbul BB (loan)	11	(2)
2011–2012	→ Kayserispor (loan)	23	(7)
2012–2013	Karabükspor	19	(4)
2013–2014	Ankaraspor	12	(4)
2014–2015	Balıkesirspor	23	(5)
2015–2016	Karşıyaka	25	(7)
2016–2017	Menemen Belediyespor	25	(8)
2018	Van BB	10	(4)

International career
2006–2009	Turkey	14	(4)

Managerial career
- 2019–2020: Kayserispor (assistant)
- 2021: Karşıyaka (assistant)
- 2021: Ankara Keçiörengücü (assistant)
- 2021–2022: Ankaraspor (assistant)
- 2022: Sakaryaspor (assistant)
- 2022–2023: Altınordu
- 2024-2025: 24 Erzincanspor
- 2025-: Erciyes 38 FSK
- * Club domestic league appearances and goals

Gökhan Ünal (born 23 July 1982) is a Turkish football manager and former player who manages the Turkish club Erciyes 38 FSK from Kayseri.

During a professional career that lasted nearly 20 years, he played for 13 clubs, most notably Kayserispor for whom he was the top scorer with during the 2005–06 Süper Lig season.

== Club career ==
Ünal joined Kayserispor in 2003 and became the top goal scorer in the Süper Lig scoring 25 goals in the 2005–06 season. His goal scoring ability was also apparent in European competitions, where he scored 6 goals in 8 games during Kayserispor's UEFA Intertoto Cup campaign in the same season, in which they became the first team from Turkey to win the competition.

He attracted attention from a number of top clubs, namely Galatasaray who tried to sign him during the summer break in 2007, but Kayserispor refused all offers, as well as another from Russian team Rubin Kazan for €6 million. He transferred to Trabzonspor on 3 June 2008 for a club record €6.25 million.

=== Fenerbahçe ===
On 18 January 2010, Fenerbahçe signed Ünal from Trabzonspor until June 2013 for €3.5 million plus Burak Yılmaz, who was on loan at Eskisehirspor until then. Ünal scored his first goal for Fenerbahçe on 14 February against Manisaspor when he scored the equalizing goal in the 97th minute.

Ünal was sent to Istanbul BB on a six-month loan after his poor start to the season.

=== Return to Kayserispor ===
Ünal was transferred back to his old club Kayserispor on a loan deal for the 2011–12 season.

== International career ==
His current record for the Turkey national team is also impressive, with a goal in his only start so far. He also scored the national team's 550th goal against on 24 March 2007, scoring the second goal in a 4–1 victory over Greece in Athens. And scored his second goal against on 12 September 2007 Turkey-Hungary.

== Career statistics ==
=== Club ===
Appearances and goals by club, season and competition
Club	Season	League			Turkish Cup		Europe		Total	
Club	Season	Division	Apps	Goals	Apps	Goals	Apps	Goals	Apps	Goals
Genclerbirligi	1999–2000	1. Lig	2	1						
Genclerbirligi	2000–01	1. Lig	13	2						
Genclerbirligi	Total		15	3						
Hacettepe (loan)	2001–02	TFF 3. Lig								
Ankaraspor (loan)	2001–02	TFF First League								
Yimpas Yozgatspor (loan)	2002–03	TFF First League								
Kayserispor	2003–04	TFF First League								
Kayserispor	2004–05	Süper Lig	30	8						
Kayserispor	2005–06	Süper Lig	32	25						
Kayserispor	2006–07	Süper Lig	25	16					29	18
Kayserispor	2007–08	Süper Lig	25	11			8	6	40	18
Kayserispor	Total						8	6	166	88
Trabzonspor	2008–09	Süper Lig	32	14						
Trabzonspor	2009–10	Süper Lig	13	2			2	0		
Trabzonspor	Total		45	16			2	0		
Fenerbahçe	2009–10	Süper Lig	10	2						
Fenerbahçe	2010–11	Süper Lig	3	0			4	0		
Fenerbahçe	Total		13	2			4	0		
Istanbul BB (loan)	2010–11	Süper Lig	11	2						
Kayserispor (loan)	2011–12	Süper Lig	23	7						
Karabükspor	2012–13	Süper Lig	12	2						
Karabükspor	2013–14	Süper Lig	7	2						
Karabükspor	Total		19	4						
Ankaraspor	2013–14	TFF First League	12	4						
Balıkesirspor	2014–15	Süper Lig	23	5						
Karşıyaka	2015–16	TFF First League	25	7						
Menemen Belediyespor	2016–17									
Career total							12	6		

=== International ===
Scores and results list Turkey's goal tally first, score column indicates score after each Ünal goal.

List of international goals scored by Gökhan Ünal
No.	Date	Venue	Opponent	Score	Result	Competition
1	28 May 2006	Hamburg, Germany	Estonia	1–0	1–1	Friendly
2	24 March 2007	Piraeus, Greece	Greece	2–1	4–1	UEFA Euro 2008 qualifying
3	12 September 2007	Istanbul, Turkey	Hungary	1–0	3–0	UEFA Euro 2008 qualifying
4	11 February 2009	İzmir, Turkey	Ivory Coast	1–0	1–1	Friendly

== Honours ==
Gençlerbirliği

- Turkish Cup: 2000–01

Kayserispor

- Turkish Cup: 2007–08
- UEFA Intertoto Cup: 2006
