= Gökhan Değirmenci =

Turkish footballer (1989)

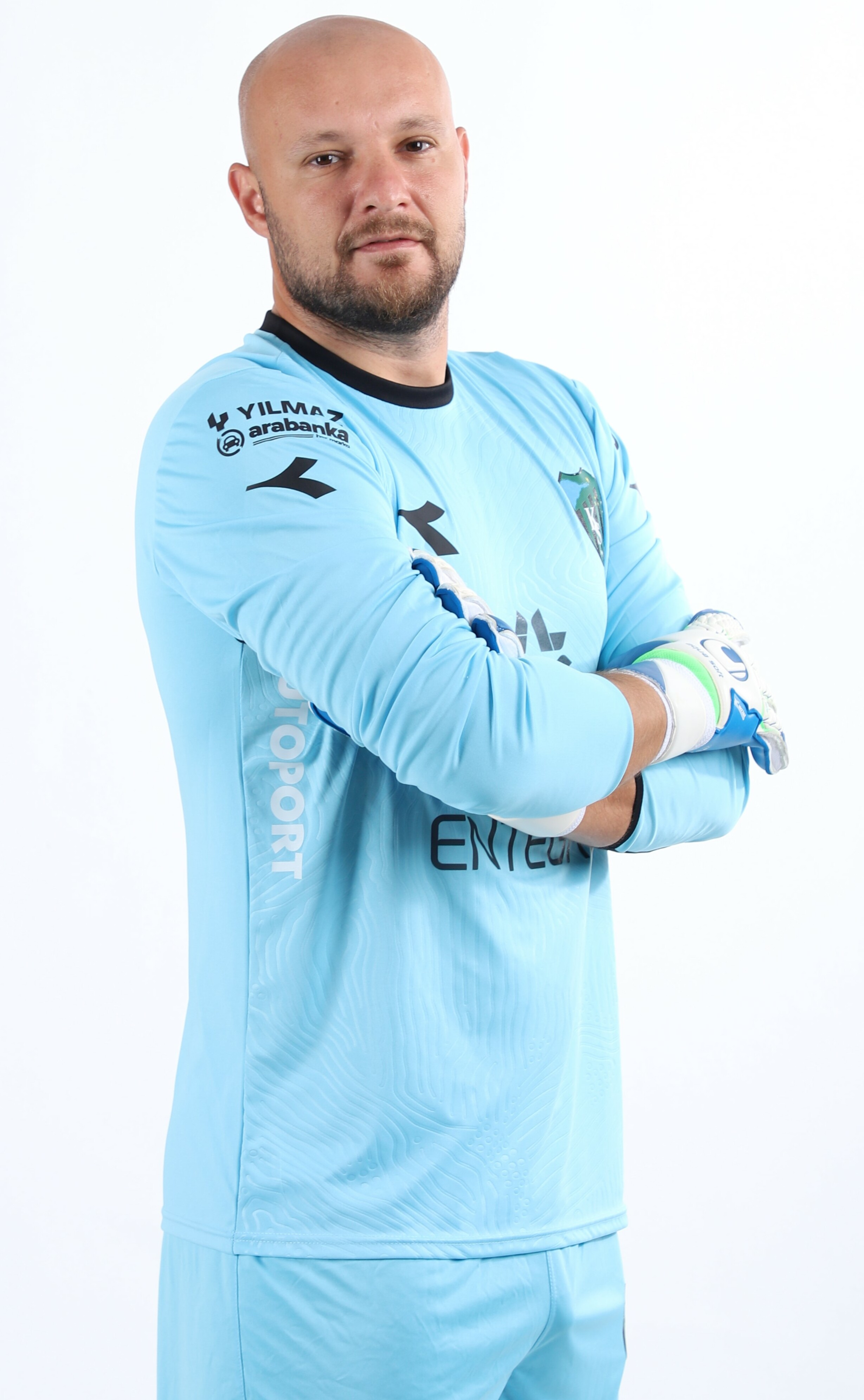

Personal information
- Date of birth: 21 March 1989 (age 37)
- Place of birth: Karşıyaka, İzmir, Turkey
- Height: 1.85 m (6 ft 1 in)
- Position: Goalkeeper

Team information
- Current team: Kayserispor
- Number: 35

Youth career
- 2000–2006: Altay

Senior career*
Years	Team	Apps	(Gls)
2006–2009	Altay	32	(0)
2009–2014	Kayserispor	26	(0)
2014–2015	Erciyesspor	41	(0)
2015–2016	Göztepe	15	(0)
2016–2017	Gaziantepspor	13	(0)
2017–2019	Boluspor	62	(0)
2019–2020	Akhisarspor	28	(0)
2020–2022	Bandırmaspor	54	(0)
2022–2026	Kocaelispor	98	(0)
2026–	Kayserispor	0	(0)

International career
2007	Turkey U18	2	(0)
2007	Turkey U19	4	(0)
2009	Turkey U21	3	(0)
2011	Turkey A2	1	(0)
- * Club domestic league appearances and goals as of 10 June 2026

Gökhan Değirmenci (born 21 March 1989) is a Turkish professional footballer who plays as a goalkeeper for Kayserispor.

He was also a youth international, earning caps at the U-18, U-19, and U-21 levels.

== Career statistics ==
As of match played 11 May 2025

Appearances and goals by club, season and competition
Club	Season	League			National Cup		Europe		Other		Total	
Club	Season	Division	Apps	Goals	Apps	Goals	Apps	Goals	Apps	Goals	Apps	Goals
Altay	2006–07	TFF 1. Lig	5	0	0	0	—		1	0	6	0
Altay	2007–08	TFF 1. Lig	9	0	1	0	—		—		10	0
Altay	2008–09	TFF 1. Lig	18	0	3	0	—		1	0	22	0
Altay	Total		32	0	4	0	—		2	0	38	0
Kayserispor	2009–10	Süper Lig	1	0	0	0	—		—		1	0
Kayserispor	2010–11	Süper Lig	7	0	0	0	—		—		7	0
Kayserispor	2011–12	Süper Lig	6	0	1	0	—		—		7	0
Kayserispor	2012–13	Süper Lig	5	0	0	0	—		—		5	0
Kayserispor	2013–14	Süper Lig	7	0	2	0	—		—		9	0
Kayserispor	Total		26	0	3	0	—		—		29	0
Erciyesspor	2013–14	Süper Lig	15	0	—		—		—		15	0
Erciyesspor	2014–15	Süper Lig	26	0	0	0	—		—		26	0
Erciyesspor	Total		41	0	0	0	—		—		41	0
Göztepe	2015–16	TFF 1. Lig	15	0	1	0	—		—		16	0
Gaziantepspor	2016–17	Süper Lig	13	0	0	0	—		—		13	0
Boluspor	2017–18	TFF 1. Lig	31	0	0	0	—		—		31	0
Boluspor	2018–19	TFF 1. Lig	31	0	0	0	—		2	0	33	0
Boluspor	Total		62	0	0	0	—		2	0	64	0
Akhisarspor	2019–20	TFF 1. Lig	28	0	0	0	—		0	0	28	0
Bandırmaspor	2020–21	TFF 1. Lig	20	0	0	0	—		—		20	0
Bandırmaspor	2021–22	TFF 1. Lig	34	0	0	0	—		3	0	37	0
Bandırmaspor	Total		54	0	0	0	—		3	0	57	0
Kocaelispor	2022–23	TFF 2. Lig	31	0	0	0	—		—		31	0
Kocaelispor	2023–24	TFF 1. Lig	22	0	0	0	—		1	0	23	0
Kocaelispor	2024–25	TFF 1. Lig	34	0	0	0	—		—		34	0
Kocaelispor	Total		87	0	0	0	—		1	0	88	0
Career total			357	0	8	0	0	0	8	0	373	0
