= Cem Kargın =

Turkish footballer

Personal information
- Full name: Cem Kargın
- Date of birth: 20 March 1978 (age 48)
- Place of birth: İzmir, Turkey
- Height: 1.76 m (5 ft 9 in)
- Position: Left back

Youth career
- 1996–1997: Altay

Senior career*
Years	Team	Apps	(Gls)
1997–1998	Altay	0	(0)
1997–1998	→ Torbalispor (loan)	24	(0)
1998–1999	İzmirspor	19	(1)
1999–2000	Eskişehirspor	14	(0)
2000–2002	Bucaspor	49	(1)
2002–2004	Yimpaş Yozgatspor	57	(3)
2004–2007	Kayseri Erciyesspor	49	(2)
2006	→ Kayserispor (loan)	1	(0)
2007	Malatyaspor	4	(0)
2007–2008	Orduspor	0	(0)
2008–2009	Boluspor	32	(2)
2009–2010	Belediye Vanspor	9	(0)
2010	Bucaspor	4	(0)
2010–2011	Akçaabat Sebatspor	10	(0)
2011–2012	Altınordu	0	(0)
- * Club domestic league appearances and goals

Cem Kargın (born 20 March 1978) is a Turkish professional retired footballer played as a left back.
