= 2006–07 TFF Lig A =

5th season of TFF First League

Lig A
- Season: 2006–07
- Champions: Gençlerbirliği OFTAŞ
- Promoted: Gençlerbirliği OFTAŞ, İstanbul B.B., Kasımpaşa
- Relegated: Türk Telekom, Akçaabat Sebatspor, Uşakspor
- Matches played: 307
- Goals scored: 785 (2.56 per match)
- Top goalscorer: Taner Demirbaş (27)

The 2006–07 TFF Lig A (known as Türk Telekom Lig A for sponsoring reasons) was the second-level football league of Turkey and the 44th season since its establishment in 1963–64. At the end of the season in which 18 teams competed in a single group, Gençlerbirliği OFTAŞ and İstanbul B.B., which finished the league in the first two places, and the play-off winner Kasımpaşa were promoted to the upper league, while Türk Telekom, Akçaabat Sebatspor and Uşakspor, which were in the last three places, were relegated.

== Final standings ==
Pos	Team	Pld	W	D	L	GF	GA	GD	Pts	Qualification or relegation
1	Gençlerbirliği OFTAŞ (C, P)	34	19	9	6	48	29	+19	66	Promotion to Süper Lig
2	İstanbul B.B. (P)	34	19	8	7	56	27	+29	65	Promotion to Süper Lig
3	Malatyaspor	34	18	7	9	66	41	+25	61	Qualification for promotion playoffs
4	Diyarbakırspor	34	14	10	10	39	32	+7	52 (Note: Head-to-head record: Diyarbakırspor 2–2 Kasımpaşa, Kasımpaşa 0–1 Diyarbakırspor (Diyarbakırspor ahead))	Qualification for promotion playoffs
5	Kasımpaşa (O, P)	34	14	10	10	53	41	+12	52	Qualification for promotion playoffs
6	Altay	34	14	9	11	51	51	0	51	Qualification for promotion playoffs
7	Elazığspor	34	14	8	12	52	49	+3	50	
8	Orduspor	34	14	7	13	50	43	+7	49	
9	İstanbulspor	34	10	13	11	39	46	−7	43 (Note: Head-to-head record: İstanbulspor 0–0 Samsunspor, Samsunspor 0–0 İstanbulspor (Equal, overall goal difference))	
10	Samsunspor	34	11	10	13	31	38	−7	43	
11	Kocaelispor	34	9	15	10	42	45	−3	42 (Note: Head-to-head record: Kocaelispor 1–0 Gaziantep B.B., Gaziantep B.B. 1–1 Kocaelispor (Kocaelispor ahead))	
12	Gaziantep B.B.	34	10	12	12	47	48	−1	42	
13	Eskişehirspor	34	10	10	14	33	39	−6	40 (Note: Head-to-head record: Eskişehirspor 0–0 Karşıyaka, Karşıyaka 1–2 Eskişehirspor (Eskişehirspor ahead))	
14	Karşıyaka	34	10	10	14	35	39	−4	40	
15	Mardinspor	34	9	11	14	27	44	−17	38	
16	Türk Telekom (R)	34	8	11	15	43	54	−11	35	Relegation to TFF Second League
17	Akçaabat Sebatspor (R)	34	8	8	18	40	65	−25	32	Relegation to TFF Second League
18	Uşakspor (R)	34	7	8	19	33	54	−21	29	Relegation to TFF Second League

Source: TFF
Rules for classification: 1) points; 2) goal difference; 3) number of goals scored.
(C) Champions; (O) Play-off winners; (P) Promoted; (R) Relegated

== Results ==
Home \ Away	AKÇ	ALT	DYB	ELA	ESK	GBB	GOF	İBB	İST	KSK	KAS	KOC	MAL	MAR	ORD	SAM	TTE	UŞA
Akçaabat Sebatspor		1–1	0–1	1–2	1–2	1–1	0–2	1–2	3–1	3–1	0–0	3–1	3–5	0–0	2–0	1–3	2–2	2–1
Altay	2–0		0–1	0–2	3–2	3–3	4–2	3–2	1–1	2–2	0–1	2–1	2–0	2–1	1–3	2–0	1–1	0–1
Diyarbakırspor	1–1	1–0		2–0	3–0	0–1	0–1	0–0	1–2	2–1	2–2	1–0	0–2	0–1	0–0	2–0	3–1	3–1
Elazığspor	3–2	2–2	1–1		2–1	2–2	4–2	0–2	1–1	0–0	1–2	0–1	3–2	0–1	3–0	0–1	1–1	3–0
Eskişehirspor	2–0	2–0	0–0	1–0		1–2	0–2	0–1	2–0	0–0	0–3	3–1	1–0	3–1	1–1	0–0	0–0	0–0
Gaziantep B.B.	1–2	4–0	2–3	2–0	3–2		0–1	1–1	1–1	2–0	2–0	1–1	1–4	0–0	1–3	0–0	1–1	4–2
Gençlerbirliği OFTAŞ	5–1	1–1	1–0	2–1	0–0	0–0		0–0	1–0	1–0	1–1	2–0	2–1	4–1	1–1	2–0	2–1	2–0
İstanbul B.B.	3–0	1–3	3–0	4–2	1–0	3–2	1–2		0–1	4–1	2–0	2–1	2–0	0–0	4–0	2–0	0–0	5–1
İstanbulspor	0–1	2–2	0–1	0–3	1–0	2–1	1–1	0–2		2–1	4–4	1–1	2–2	2–0	3–2	0–0	1–1	2–0
Karşıyaka	1–1	1–2	1–0	1–1	1–2	2–1	0–1	1–2	0–0		3–0	1–0	0–0	2–0	0–1	1–2	1–0	3–1
Kasımpaşa	6–0	0–1	0–1	1–2	1–1	4–1	0–0	1–0	2–1	2–0		3–2	1–3	3–0	1–2	0–1	1–0	1–1
Kocaelispor	3–1	1–1	3–3	2–2	1–1	1–0	2–1	1–1	0–2	1–1	2–2		3–2	1–0	1–1	3–4	2–0	1–1
Malatyaspor	4–3	4–0	3–1	6–2	2–1	3–1	2–1	1–2	0–0	1–1	3–1	0–0		4–1	2–1	0–0	3–1	3–1
Mardinspor	1–1	2–1	1–1	1–2	2–0	0–1	3–0	1–1	3–1	0–3	1–1	1–1	1–0		1–1	0–0	0–1	0–4
Orduspor	3–1	1–0	2–1	1–2	4–1	0–1	0–1	1–2	3–2	3–0	2–4	1–1	1–0	1–1		2–1	5–0	4–0
Samsunspor	1–2	0–2	0–0	0–2	2–1	2–1	1–2	1–0	0–0	1–1	0–1	1–1	0–1	0–1	2–0		3–2	0–0
Türk Telekom	2–0	2–3	2–2	3–1	0–2	2–2	1–1	2–1	2–3	1–3	2–2	0–1	2–3	3–0	1–0	5–1		0–3
Uşakspor	2–0	3–4	0–2	1–2	1–1	1–1	2–1	0–0	4–0	0–1	0–2	0–1	0–0	0–1	1–0	1–4	0–1	

Source: TFF
Legend: Blue = home team win; Yellow = draw; Red = away team win.

== Promotion play-offs ==
Promotion play-offs were organized in 19 Mayıs Stadium in Ankara between May 27 and May 30

Semi-finals
27 May 2007
Altay	1
Malatyaspor	0
28 May 2007
Diyarbakırspor	1
Kasımpaşa	2

Final
30 May 2007, 20:00
Altay	3 (6)
Kasımpaşa	3 (7)

== Top goalscorers ==
Rank	Player	Club	Goals
1	(Turkey) Taner Demirbaş	Malatyaspor	27
2	(Turkey) Sadi Çolak	Orduspor	21
3	(Turkey) Mohamed Ali Kurtuluş	Diyarbakırspor	19
4	(Turkey) Serdar Özbayraktar	Gaziantep BB	18
5	(Turkey) Erhan Küçük	Kasımpaşa	17
6	(Turkey) Erman Kılıç	Elazığspor	14
6	(Turkey) Ferdi Başoda	Elazığspor	14
7	(Turkey) Alp Küçükvardar	Türk Telekom	11
7	(Turkey) Ferit Alper Salgın	Kasımpaşa	11
7	(Czech Republic) Zdeněk Šenkeřík	Malatyaspor	11
