= 2007–08 TFF 1. Lig =

6th season of TFF 1. Lig

1. Lig
- Season: 2007–08
- Champions: Kocaelispor
- Promoted: Kocaelispor, Antalyaspor, Eskişehirspor
- Relegated: Elazığspor, Istanbulspor, Mardinspor
- Matches played: 307
- Goals scored: 842 (2.74 per match)
- Top goalscorer: Taner Gülleri (21)

The 2007–08 TFF 1. Lig (referred to as the Bank Asya 1. Lig for sponsorship reasons) was the second-level football league of Turkey and the 45th season since its establishment in 1963–64. At the end of the season in which 18 teams competed in a single group, Kocaelispor and Antalyaspor, which finished the league in the first two places, and the play-off winner Eskişehirspor were promoted to the upper league, while Elazığspor, Istanbulspor and Mardinspor, which were in the last three places, were relegated.

== Standings ==
Pos	Team	Pld	W	D	L	GF	GA	GD	Pts	Qualification or relegation
1	Kocaelispor (C, P)	34	19	7	8	59	37	+22	64	Promotion to Süper Lig
2	Antalyaspor (P)	34	15	16	3	56	33	+23	61	Promotion to Süper Lig
3	Sakaryaspor	34	16	10	8	55	34	+21	58	Qualification for promotion playoffs
4	Eskişehirspor (O, P)	34	16	9	9	52	35	+17	57 (Note: Head-to-head record: Eskişehirspor 3–2 Diyarbakırspor, Diyarbakırspor 1–0 Eskişehirspor (Equal, overall goal difference))	Qualification for promotion playoffs
5	Diyarbakırspor	34	16	9	9	53	37	+16	57	Qualification for promotion playoffs
6	Boluspor	34	13	14	7	50	46	+4	53	Qualification for promotion playoffs
7	Kayseri Erciyesspor	34	14	10	10	55	42	+13	52	
8	Orduspor	34	12	14	8	39	44	−5	50	
9	Karşıyaka	34	11	14	9	44	41	+3	47 (Note: Head-to-head record: Karşıyaka 3–0 Altay, Altay 0–0 Karşıyaka (Karşıyaka ahead))	
10	Altay	34	13	8	13	47	47	0	47	
11	Giresunspor	34	10	13	11	41	44	−3	43 (Note: Head-to-head record: Malatyaspor 0–1 Giresunspor, Giresunspor 1–1 Malatyaspor (Giresunspor ahead))	
12	Malatyaspor	34	12	7	15	44	43	+1	43	
13	Kartalspor	34	10	12	12	52	57	−5	42	
14	Gaziantep B.B.	34	9	12	13	53	51	+2	39	
15	Samsunspor	34	10	8	16	45	61	−16	38	
16	Elazığspor (R)	34	8	10	16	40	54	−14	34	Relegation to TFF Second League
17	İstanbulspor (R)	34	6	8	20	25	58	−33	26	Relegation to TFF Second League
18	Mardinspor (R)	34	3	5	26	26	72	−46	14	Relegation to TFF Second League

Source: TFF
Rules for classification: 1) points; 2) goal difference; 3) number of goals scored.
(C) Champions; (O) Play-off winners; (P) Promoted; (R) Relegated

== Results ==
Home \ Away	ALT	ANT	BOL	DYB	ELA	ESK	GBB	GRS	İST	KSK	KRT	KER	KOC	MAL	MAR	ORD	SAK	SAM
Altay		0–0	2–3	2–2	4–3	2–1	1–1	2–2	2–1	0–0	2–0	2–1	0–1	1–0	2–0	1–2	1–1	4–1
Antalyaspor	4–2		4–1	0–1	2–1	3–1	2–2	4–3	0–0	2–2	1–1	1–1	0–0	2–2	6–0	1–1	1–1	4–2
Boluspor	1–2	0–0		2–2	3–0	2–1	1–1	0–1	1–1	2–1	2–2	3–3	1–1	2–0	4–2	3–1	2–1	2–1
Diyarbakırspor	1–0	2–1	2–2		1–0	1–0	2–2	1–2	3–0	0–1	4–1	1–1	2–1	2–0	2–0	1–1	4–1	5–2
Elazığspor	3–1	0–0	1–2	1–2		2–4	2–0	1–1	2–2	0–0	2–1	1–1	1–3	1–1	2–1	0–0	0–2	1–2
Eskişehirspor	3–0	1–1	0–1	3–2	2–0		1–1	2–1	1–1	1–0	1–1	2–0	2–2	2–0	2–0	2–1	1–1	2–1
Gaziantep B.B.	0–0	1–2	6–2	0–0	2–1	1–4		2–1	0–1	2–1	4–1	3–0	2–2	1–1	2–1	1–2	1–2	1–2
Giresunspor	0–2	0–0	0–0	0–0	1–1	1–2	2–2		3–2	0–0	2–3	2–1	3–2	1–1	2–1	2–2	1–1	2–0
İstanbulspor	0–5	1–2	0–1	1–2	1–2	0–3	0–5	3–2		1–1	2–1	0–0	0–1	0–2	0–2	0–1	0–2	1–1
Karşıyaka	3–0	0–1	3–0	2–2	0–0	3–3	2–1	1–1	1–0		1–3	2–2	0–2	1–0	3–1	1–1	3–1	3–2
Kartalspor	1–1	0–1	3–1	1–3	2–1	0–1	3–2	3–1	0–0	2–2		1–1	1–2	1–0	2–2	3–0	2–2	3–3
Kayseri Erciyesspor	1–2	0–2	2–1	1–0	2–3	1–1	0–2	2–1	4–1	2–2	4–0		6–1	3–1	2–0	0–0	2–1	2–0
Kocaelispor	3–0	2–0	1–1	2–0	0–1	1–0	5–2	2–0	2–0	1–0	0–0	3–0		3–1	2–0	2–0	1–1	2–3
Malatyaspor	2–1	1–2	0–0	3–1	3–2	2–1	2–0	0–1	4–0	3–0	2–0	0–3	4–0		0–0	2–0	1–2	1–2
Mardinspor	3–0	0–2	2–4	1–0	1–4	0–1	1–1	0–1	0–3	1–3	1–1	1–2	0–4	1–4		0–1	0–2	2–2
Orduspor	0–2	3–3	0–0	1–0	1–1	2–1	1–0	1–0	1–0	0–0	2–5	2–1	2–1	1–1	1–0		0–0	1–1
Sakaryaspor	1–0	0–1	0–0	0–2	4–0	1–0	3–2	0–0	1–2	3–0	3–1	0–1	4–1	4–0	3–2	2–2		2–0
Samsunspor	2–1	1–1	0–0	2–0	2–0	0–0	0–0	0–1	0–1	1–2	1–3	0–3	0–3	2–0	2–0	7–5	0–3	

Source: TFF
Legend: Blue = home team win; Yellow = draw; Red = away team win.

== Promotion play-offs ==
Promotion play-offs will play in BJK İnönü Stadium in İstanbul. Semifinal matches will take place on May 16. League third is faced with league sixth and league fourth faced with league fifth. Winners of these matches will play on May 18 at final match. Winner of the match gained playing in Süper Lig in 2008-09 season as Third of First League.

Semi-finals
16 May 2008, 20:45
Eskişehirspor	0 (6)
Diyarbakırspor	0 (5)
16 May 2008, 18:00
Sakaryaspor	2 (3)
Boluspor	2 (5)

Final
18 May 2008, 20:30
Boluspor	0
Eskişehirspor	2

== Top goalscorers ==
Rank	Player	Club	Goals
1	(Turkey) Taner Gülleri	Kocaelispor	21
2	(Turkey) Cenk İşler	Antalyaspor	19
2	(Turkey) Coşkun Birdal	Eskişehirspor	19
2	(Turkey) Taner Demirbaş	Sakaryaspor	19
5	(Turkey) Adem Büyük	Altay	16
6	(Turkey) İskender Alın	Kartalspor	14
6	(Turkey) Mustafa Şahintürk	Gaziantep BB	14
8	(Turkey) Erman Ergin	Sakaryaspor	13
8	(Turkey) Şehmus Özer	Karşıyaka	13
10	(Turkey) Hüseyin Kartal	Diyarbakırspor	12
