= Eray Birniçan =

Turkish footballer (born 1988)

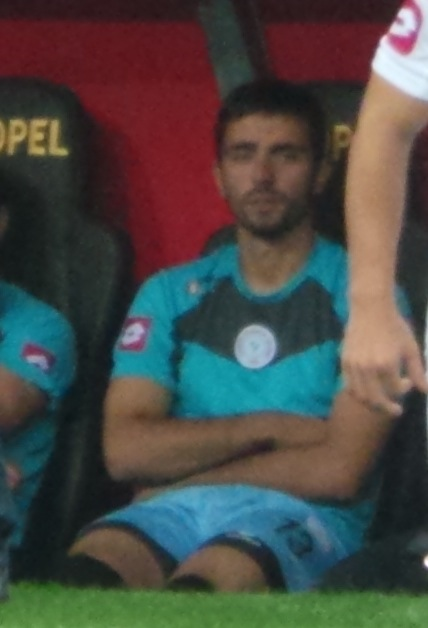
- Eray Birniçan in 2013

Personal information
- Date of birth: 20 July 1988 (age 38)
- Place of birth: Bakırköy, Istanbul, Turkey
- Height: 1.80 m (5 ft 11 in)
- Position: Goalkeeper

Team information
- Current team: Fenerbahçe (goalkeeping coach)

Youth career
- 1999–2003: Yıldırım Bosna

Senior career*
Years	Team	Apps	(Gls)
2003–2006	Yıldırım Bosna	6	(0)
2006–2010	Konyaspor	2	(0)
2008–2009	→ Samsunspor (loan)	4	(0)
2010–2013	Gaziantepspor	3	(0)
2013–2014	Çaykur Rizespor	0	(0)
2014–2015	Gaziantepspor	12	(0)
2015–2019	Kasımpaşa	11	(0)
2019–2020	Alanyaspor	0	(0)
2020–2022	Konyaspor	10	(0)
2022–2023	Kastamonuspor 1966	28	(0)
2023–2024	Belediye Derincespor	18	(0)
2024–2025	Karacabey Belediyespor	12	(0)

International career
2004–2005	Turkey U17	3	(0)
2005–2006	Turkey U18	2	(0)
2006–2007	Turkey U19	5	(0)
2007	Turkey U21	3	(0)
- * Club domestic league appearances and goals as of 3 May 2025

Eray Birniçan (born 20 July 1988) was a Turkish professional footballer who played as a goalkeeper and currently goalkeeping coach of Turkish Süper Lig club Fenerbahçe. He is also a former youth international.
