= Ataman (surname) =

Ataman is a Turkish surname. Notable people with the surname include:

- Bülent Ataman (born 1974), Turkish footballer
- Ergin Ataman (born 1966), Turkish basketball coach
- Kutluğ Ataman (born 1961), Turkish filmmaker
