= Akçaabat Fatih Stadium =

Multi-purpose stadium in Trabzon, Turkey

Coordinates: 41°01′01.81″N 39°35′06.19″E

- Interactive map of Akçaabat Fatih Stadium
- Location: Akçaabat, Turkey
- Owner: Akçaabat Sebatspor
- Capacity: 6,200
- Surface: Grass

Akçaabat Fatih Stadium (Turkish: Akçaabat Fatih Stadı) is a multi-purpose stadium in Akçaabat district of Trabzon, Turkey. It is currently used mostly for football matches and is the home stadium of Akçaabat Sebatspor. The stadium holds 6,200 people.
