= Hasan Gültang =

Turkish footballer and coach

Personal information
- Full name: Hasan Okan Gültang
- Date of birth: 29 October 1972 (age 54)
- Place of birth: Adana, Turkey
- Position: Goalkeeper

Senior career*
Years	Team	Apps	(Gls)
1993–1995	Gençlerbirliği		
1995–1996	İstanbulspor		
1996–1999	Adanaspor		
1999–2002	Gaziantepspor		
2002–2003	Kayseri Erciyesspor		
2003–2004	Mersin İdmanyurdu		
2004–2005	Karabükspor		
2005	Adanaspor	2	(0)
2005–2006	Kahramanmaraşspor	3	(0)
2006	Yıldırım Bosna		
2006–2007	Afyonkarahisarspor		
2007–2008	Bugsaşspor		

International career
1995	Turkey	1	(0)

Managerial career
- 2009: Giresunspor (goalkeeper coach)
- 2011–2012: Gaziantepspor (goalkeeper coach)
- 2013: Şanlıurfaspor (goalkeeper coach)
- 2014: Manisaspor (goalkeeper coach)
- 2016: Bayrampaşaspor (goalkeeper coach)
- * Club domestic league appearances and goals

Hasan Okan Gültang (born 29 October 1972) is a former Turkish footballer and later football coach. He played his only cap for Turkey against Israel on 8 March 1995.

== Biography ==
Gültang was the starting keeper in 1993 Mediterranean Games. He was the backup keeper of Rüştü Reçber at 1994 UEFA European Under-21 Football Championship qualification and was the backup of Engin İpekoğlu in UEFA Euro 1996 qualifying.

== Honours ==
- Mediterranean Games: 1993
