= 2002–03 Turkish Second League Category A =

Turkish Second League Category A
- Season: 2002–03
- Champions: Konyaspor
- Promoted: Konyaspor, Çaykur Rizespor, Akçaabat Sebatspor
- Relegated: Erzurumspor, Gümüşhane Doğanspor, Şekerspor
- Matches played: 306
- Goals scored: 850 (2.78 per match)
- Top goalscorer: Yunus Altun (24)

The 2002–03 Turkish Second League Category A was the second-level football league of Turkey and the 40th season since its establishment in 1963–64. At the end of the season in which 18 teams competed in a single group, Konyaspor, Çaykur Rizespor and Akçaabat Sebatspor, which finished the league in the first three places, were promoted to the upper league, while Erzurumspor, Gümüşhane Doğanspor and Şekerspor, which were in the last three places, were relegated.

== Final standings ==
Pos	Team	Pld	W	D	L	GF	GA	GD	Pts	Qualification or relegation
1	Konyaspor (C, P)	34	20	8	6	55	28	+27	68	Promotion to Süper Lig
2	Çaykur Rizespor (P)	34	21	3	10	63	31	+32	66	Promotion to Süper Lig
3	Akçaabat Sebatspor (P)	34	19	7	8	61	39	+22	64	Promotion to Süper Lig
4	Sivasspor	34	17	11	6	63	39	+24	62	
5	Kayserispor	34	17	8	9	54	37	+17	59	
6	Sakaryaspor	34	15	13	6	48	33	+15	58	
7	B.B. Ankaraspor	34	15	11	8	57	43	+14	56	
8	Manisaspor	34	13	13	8	49	36	+13	52	
9	Yozgatspor	34	11	12	11	47	52	−5	45	
10	Adana Demirspor	34	12	6	16	62	65	−3	42 (Note: Head-to-head points: Adana Demirspor 10 pts, Antalyaspor 4 pts, Mersin İdman Yurdu 3 pts.)	
11	Antalyaspor	34	11	9	14	37	47	−10	42	
12	Mersin İdman Yurdu	34	12	6	16	52	51	+1	42	
13	İzmirspor	34	12	5	17	47	65	−18	41	
14	İstanbul B.B.	34	11	7	16	35	48	−13	40	
15	Çanakkale Dardanelspor	34	9	7	18	34	48	−14	34	
16	Erzurumspor (R)	34	8	7	19	30	60	−30	31	Relegation to Turkish Second League Category B
17	Gümüşhane Doğanspor (R)	34	7	8	19	27	57	−30	29	Relegation to Turkish Second League Category B
18	Şekerspor (R)	34	2	7	25	29	71	−42	13	Relegation to Turkish Second League Category B

Source: TFF
Rules for classification: 1) points; 2) goal difference; 3) number of goals scored.
(C) Champions; (P) Promoted; (R) Relegated

== Results ==
Home \ Away	ADS	AKÇ	ANT	ANK	ÇDA	ÇYR	ERZ	GDO	İBB	İZM	KAY	KON	MAN	MİY	SAK	SİV	ŞKR	YOZ
Adana Demirspor		0–4	1–0	2–2	0–1	3–4	3–0	3–2	2–2	9–1	1–2	3–0	2–5	3–2	1–2	3–2	2–1	2–0
Akçaabat Sebatspor	2–1		4–0	1–0	5–2	1–1	2–0	1–1	4–2	2–1	1–2	1–0	2–1	0–1	3–1	1–1	5–1	3–1
Antalyaspor	0–0	2–0		1–0	2–2	1–5	4–1	4–1	2–1	2–1	1–1	0–2	0–3	2–0	1–1	1–1	3–1	2–5
B.B. Ankaraspor	5–3	3–0	1–3		1–1	2–1	5–1	3–2	1–0	1–2	4–1	0–0	2–2	4–1	0–3	0–0	1–1	2–0
Çanakkale Dardanelspor	0–1	0–1	1–0	0–3		1–2	1–0	1–0	3–0	2–1	3–5	0–2	1–2	1–1	1–2	1–1	2–1	2–0
Çaykur Rizespor	1–0	2–1	1–2	1–0	3–0		3–1	1–0	3–1	2–0	2–0	1–0	1–1	2–1	4–0	3–0	5–1	2–3
Erzurumspor	2–1	0–4	1–1	1–1	1–0	1–3		1–0	1–3	3–1	1–0	0–1	1–0	1–0	2–2	0–0	2–0	1–2
Gümüşhane Doğanspor	3–3	0–0	2–0	1–2	1–0	0–3	2–0		1–0	1–0	0–0	0–0	1–0	1–0	0–3	0–1	0–0	2–3
İstanbul B.B.	2–1	1–2	1–1	0–3	1–0	2–0	2–1	1–1		3–1	0–0	0–2	0–0	2–0	0–3	1–3	2–0	1–0
İzmirspor	3–1	0–1	1–1	7–2	1–1	1–0	3–2	1–0	2–0		0–1	0–0	2–5	3–2	0–2	2–0	1–0	0–2
Kayserispor	3–0	4–1	1–0	0–1	2–0	1–1	3–1	4–1	2–1	2–1		1–2	3–0	3–0	0–0	3–1	0–0	2–0
Konyaspor	2–2	3–1	1–0	2–0	0–0	1–0	5–2	2–0	4–0	4–1	3–1		1–1	2–0	2–0	2–2	3–1	2–0
Manisaspor	2–1	1–1	0–0	2–2	2–1	0–1	3–0	2–0	0–2	4–0	0–0	4–2		1–0	0–0	1–1	1–1	2–2
Mersin İdman Yurdu	1–2	3–1	3–0	3–3	2–1	2–0	0–0	5–1	0–1	2–3	2–1	3–0	0–1		0–0	4–2	3–2	2–0
Sakaryaspor	2–2	1–1	1–0	0–1	1–0	1–0	0–0	3–1	1–0	1–1	3–1	1–1	2–1	2–2		1–1	3–1	1–1
Sivasspor	4–2	1–2	2–0	0–0	2–1	1–0	1–0	3–1	1–1	5–2	3–1	3–1	3–0	2–1	2–1		1–0	4–0
Şekerspor	1–2	1–1	0–1	0–1	1–3	0–4	2–0	7–1	0–0	1–3	1–2	0–1	0–1	2–4	1–3	0–6		0–3
Yozgatspor	2–0	1–2	1–0	1–1	1–1	2–1	2–2	0–0	3–2	1–1	2–2	0–2	0–0	2–2	2–1	3–3	1–1	

Source: TFF
Legend: Blue = home team win; Yellow = draw; Red = away team win.

== Top goalscorers ==
Rank	Player	Club	Goals
1	(Turkey) Yunus Altun	Çaykur Rizespor	24
2	(Turkey) Taner Demirbaş	Adana Demirspor	19
3	(Turkey) Halim Karaköse	İzmirspor	16
4	(Turkey) Burak Akdiş	Sivasspor	15
5	(Turkey) Mustafa Özsöğüt	Yimpaş Yozgatspor	14
5	(Turkey) Okan Öztürk	Çaykur Rizespor	14
7	(Turkey) Adem Akın	Konyaspor	12
7	(Turkey) Bayram Çolak	B.B. Ankaraspor	12
7	(Turkey) Birol Aksancak	B.B. Ankaraspor	12
7	(Turkey) Orhan Kaynak	Kayserispor	12
