= Levent Yılmaz =

Turkish footballer

Personal information
- Date of birth: January 20, 1990 (age 36)
- Place of birth: Karabük, Turkey
- Position: Midfielder

Team information
- Current team: Erzincan Refahiyespor

Senior career*
| Years | Team | Apps | (Gls) |
| 2009– | Karabükspor | 2 | (0) |
| 2009–2010 | → Hatayspor (loan) | 12 | (1) |
| 2011 | → Bayrampaşa (loan) | 3 | (0) |
| 2012 | → Ünyespor (loan) | 2 | (1) |
| 2012–2013 | Erzincan Refahiyespor | | |
| 2013-2014 | Yimpas Yozgat | | |
| 2014-2015 | Payas Bld 1975 | | |
| 2015 | Turanspor | | |
- * Club domestic league appearances and goals as of 11 February 2012

Levent Yılmaz (born 20 January 1990) is a Turkish professional footballer who last played as a striker for Turanspor (formerly known as Şekerspor).
