= Sidespor =

Turkish sports club

- Full name: Sidespor
- Founded: 1992
- Dissolved: 2017
- Ground: Side Atatürk, Antalya
- Capacity: 1050
- Chairman: Hasan Sen
- League: Amatör Futbol Ligleri
- pattern_la1=
Home colours

Sidespor was a Turkish sports club based in Side near Antalya, mainly concentrated on football. The club currently plays in the Amatör Futbol Ligleri.

== Kits ==
The club plays in black and yellow kits.

== Stadium ==
Currently the team plays at the 1050 capacity Side Atatürk Stadium.

== League participations ==
- TFF Second League: ?-2004
- TFF Third League: 2004–2007
