= Oktay Kuday =

German-Turkish footballer

Personal information
- Date of birth: 6 August 1979 (age 47)
- Place of birth: Karlsruhe, West Germany
- Height: 1.72 m (5 ft 8 in)
- Position: Striker

Senior career*
Years	Team	Apps	(Gls)
1997	Karlsruher SC	1	(0)
1999–2003	Altay		
2003–2004	Manisaspor	25	(6)
2004–2005	Altay	17	(2)
2005–2006	Mardinspor	15	(1)
2006–2007	Elazığspor	14	(1)
2007–2008	Tokatspor	25	(8)
2008–2009	Göztepe		
- * Club domestic league appearances and goals

Oktay Kuday (born 6 August 1979) is a German-Turkish former professional footballer who played as a striker.

== Club career ==
Kuday was born in Karlsruhe. He formerly played for Karlsruher SC, Altay, Manisaspor, Mardinspor, Elazığspor, and Tokatspor. He appeared in one Bundesliga match for Karlsruher SC during the 1997–98 season. Kuday also appeared in 23 Turkish Süper Lig matches for Altay S.K. during the 2002–03 season.
