= Efe İnanç =

Turkish footballer

Personal information
- Full name: Efe İnanç
- Date of birth: March 24, 1980 (age 46)
- Place of birth: Üsküdar, İstanbul Province, Turkey
- Position: Attacking midfielder

Youth career
- 1994–1999: Fenerbahçe PAF

Senior career*
Years	Team	Apps	(Gls)
1999–2000	Fenerbahçe	2	(0)
2000–2001	→ İzmirspor(loan)	16	(4)
2001–2004	İzmirspor	58	(6)
2004–2013	İstanbul Başakşehir	149	(8)
2013–2014	Adana Demirspor	29	(7)
2014–2015	Kocaeli Birlik Spor	12	(0)
- * Club domestic league appearances and goals as of June 6, 2008

Efe İnanç (born March 24, 1980, in Üsküdar) is a Turkish footballer who last played for Kocaeli Birlik Spor in as attacking midfield position.
