= Ahmet Arslaner =

Turkish footballer

Personal information
- Date of birth: 24 December 1970 (age 55)
- Place of birth: Üsküdar, Turkey
- Height: 1.71 m (5 ft 7 in)
- Position: Defender

Senior career*
Years	Team	Apps	(Gls)
–1995	Küçükköyspor		
1995–1999	Zeytinburnuspor		
1999–2000	Vanspor		
2000–2003	Kocaelispor		
2003–2004	Mersin İdman Yurdu		
2004–2005	Elazığspor		
2005	Kocaelispor		
2005–2007	Etimesgut Şekerspor		

Managerial career
- 2009–2010: Mersin İdman Yurdu (assistant)
- 2013–2014: Kocaelispor
- * Club domestic league appearances and goals

Ahmet Arslaner (born 24 December 1970) is a Turkish football manager and former player who played as a defender.

== Honours ==
Kocaelispor

- Turkish Cup: 2001–02
