= 2003–04 Turkish Second League Category A =

Turkish Second League Category A
- Season: 2003–04
- Champions: Sakaryaspor
- Promoted: Sakaryaspor, Erciyesspor, B.B. Ankaraspor
- Relegated: Adana Demirspor, Göztepe, İzmirspor
- Matches played: 306
- Goals scored: 841 (2.75 per match)
- Top goalscorer: Ümit İnal (21)

The 2003–04 Turkish Second League Category A was the second-level football league of Turkey and the 41st season since its establishment in 1963–64. At the end of the season in which 18 teams competed in a single group, Sakaryaspor, Erciyesspor and B.B. Ankaraspor, which finished the league in the first three places, were promoted to the upper league, while Adana Demirspor, Göztepe and İzmirspor, which were in the last three places, were relegated.

== Final standings ==
Pos	Team	Pld	W	D	L	GF	GA	GD	Pts	Qualification or relegation
1	Sakaryaspor (C, P)	34	21	5	8	62	36	+26	68	Promotion to Süper Lig
2	Kayseri Erciyesspor (P)	34	19	9	6	47	27	+20	66	Promotion to Süper Lig
3	B.B. Ankaraspor (P)	34	19	8	7	58	41	+17	65	Promotion to Süper Lig
4	Manisaspor	34	18	7	9	59	36	+23	61	
5	Kocaelispor	34	16	9	9	54	44	+10	57	
6	Kayserispor	34	15	10	9	59	51	+8	55	
7	Antalyaspor	34	14	8	12	45	45	0	50	
8	Sivasspor	34	14	6	14	44	46	−2	48	
9	Altay	34	12	11	11	58	48	+10	47	
10	Türk Telekom	34	11	12	11	40	38	+2	45	
11	Yozgatspor	34	10	9	15	44	52	−8	39 (Note: Head-to-head record: Yozgatspor 2–1 Karşıyaka, Karşıyaka 0–5 Yozgatspor (Yozgatspor ahead))	
12	Karşıyaka	34	10	9	15	36	46	−10	39	
13	İstanbul B.B.	34	10	7	17	42	50	−8	37	
14	Çanakkale Dardanelspor	34	9	8	17	46	58	−12	35	
15	Mersin İdman Yurdu	34	9	7	18	38	44	−6	34	
16	Adana Demirspor (R)	34	8	9	17	36	56	−20	33 (Note: Head-to-head record: Adana Demirspor 3–1 Göztepe, Göztepe 0–2 Adana Demirspor (Adana Demirspor ahead))	Relegation to Turkish Second League Category B
17	Göztepe (R)	34	8	9	17	36	62	−26	33	Relegation to Turkish Second League Category B
18	İzmirspor (R)	34	8	7	19	37	61	−24	31	Relegation to Turkish Second League Category B

Source: TFF
Rules for classification: 1) points; 2) goal difference; 3) number of goals scored.
(C) Champions; (P) Promoted; (R) Relegated

== Results ==
Home \ Away	ADS	ALT	ANK	ANT	ÇDA	GÖZ	İBB	İZM	KSK	KER	KAY	KOC	MAN	MİY	SAK	SİV	TTE	YOZ
Adana Demirspor		0–0	2–3	1–1	2–5	3–1	1–2	3–2	0–0	1–2	0–0	4–0	2–5	1–1	2–1	0–1	0–1	2–2
Altay	4–0		2–2	1–3	3–2	6–2	4–1	1–2	1–0	1–2	0–1	1–1	1–1	1–1	0–1	2–0	3–3	1–1
B.B. Ankaraspor	1–1	0–0		3–1	1–0	2–0	2–0	3–1	3–1	4–0	2–3	1–0	2–1	2–1	1–1	1–0	2–3	2–2
Antalyaspor	0–1	1–0	1–2		1–1	4–1	2–3	3–2	0–1	1–1	2–0	1–1	0–1	2–1	3–2	3–2	1–2	3–1
Çanakkale Dardanelspor	4–0	2–3	1–2	0–1		1–1	1–1	1–0	0–1	3–1	1–1	4–1	1–2	2–1	1–4	3–1	1–1	2–1
Göztepe	0–2	1–1	1–1	1–2	2–0		1–0	1–1	1–0	0–1	2–2	4–2	0–3	0–0	1–1	2–1	0–3	1–2
İstanbul B.B.	5–1	0–3	3–0	0–0	0–2	0–1		3–0	1–1	0–0	3–3	0–3	5–1	0–2	0–1	2–1	1–2	2–1
İzmirspor	1–1	1–3	0–1	1–0	5–1	2–3	2–1		0–0	0–1	1–0	0–3	3–2	0–0	2–1	0–3	2–0	0–0
Karşıyaka	2–0	2–2	1–3	1–0	0–0	5–2	0–2	2–0		1–2	1–0	3–1	0–1	4–3	1–3	0–1	2–0	0–5
Kayseri Erciyesspor	2–1	6–1	1–2	1–1	4–1	2–4	1–0	1–1	2–1		1–1	2–2	2–0	4–2	0–3	6–4	1–1	1–0
Kayserispor	1–0	2–2	2–1	2–2	3–0	3–0	1–1	3–1	1–0	1–2		2–1	1–0	3–0	0–2	0–0	1–0	1–0
Kocaelispor	1–1	2–0	1–1	1–1	4–1	2–1	3–2	3–0	1–1	4–2	1–2		2–0	1–0	1–0	1–0	2–1	3–1
Manisaspor	1–2	1–2	2–1	4–0	1–1	1–0	1–0	3–0	1–1	1–1	1–1	1–1		2–1	3–0	2–3	1–1	4–0
Mersin İdman Yurdu	2–0	0–3	0–1	4–0	2–2	4–0	2–0	3–2	1–0	0–1	1–0	0–1	1–2		0–1	4–0	0–0	0–1
Sakaryaspor	1–0	2–1	4–2	1–0	2–1	2–1	2–2	4–2	5–0	1–0	1–0	1–1	0–2	5–1		2–1	0–0	4–0
Sivasspor	2–1	2–1	2–0	0–1	1–9	1–1	2–0	4–2	1–1	2–1	1–3	2–1	0–1	1–0	2–1		0–0	2–2
Türk Telekom	0–1	0–1	2–3	1–2	3–0	0–0	2–0	1–1	1–1	1–3	2–2	3–0	0–3	2–0	0–1	2–1		1–2
Yozgatspor	2–0	2–3	1–1	1–2	2–1	2–0	1–2	2–0	2–1	1–4	0–1	1–2	1–4	0–0	5–2	0–0	0–0	

Source: TFF
Legend: Blue = home team win; Yellow = draw; Red = away team win.

== Top goalscorers ==
Rank	Player	Club	Goals
1	(Turkey) Ümit İnal	Altay	21
2	(Turkey) İbrahim Akın	Altay	18
2	(Turkey) Mehmet Şen	Çanakkale Dardanelspor	18
4	(Turkey) Birol Aksancak	İstanbul B.B.	16
5	(Turkey) Alp Küçükvardar	B.B. Ankaraspor	15
5	(Turkey) Engin Öztonga	Kocaelispor	15
5	(Turkey) Mustafa Kocabey	Kayserispor	15
5	(Turkey) Taner Demirbaş	Mersin İdman Yurdu	15
9	(Turkey) Burak Akdiş	Sakaryaspor	13
9	(Turkey) Bülent Öztürk	Kayserispor	13
