= Taner Gülleri =

Turkish footballer and coach

Personal information
- Full name: Taner Gülleri
- Date of birth: 29 April 1976 (age 50)
- Place of birth: Adana, Turkey
- Height: 1.85 m (6 ft 1 in)
- Position: Striker

Senior career*
Years	Team	Apps	(Gls)
1993–1996	Adana Demirspor	33	(7)
1997	Tarsus İdman Yurdu	16	(1)
1997–1998	Fethiyespor	32	(18)
1998–2002	Bursaspor	55	(2)
2000–2001	→ Beykozspor 1908 (loan)	42	(30)
2002	Sakaryaspor	5	(1)
2003	Kayserispor	4	(0)
2003–2006	Antalyaspor	88	(38)
2007–2009	Kocaelispor	57	(37)
2009–2011	İstanbul B.B.	1	(0)
Total		333	(134)

Managerial career
- 2012–2013: Samsunspor U15
- 2013: Göztepe (assistant)
- 2015: Kahramanmaraşspor
- 2016: Kartalspor
- 2019: Gölcükspor
- * Club domestic league appearances and goals

Taner Gülleri (born 29 April 1976) is a Turkish football coach and former player.

== Career ==
Gülleri was the top scorer of the TFF First League in 2008 with 21 goals.
