= Tufan Esin =

Turkish footballer

Tufan Esin (born 7 August 1980 in Silifke), is a Turkish footballer who plays for Diyarbakirspor as a forward.

Esin previously played for Manisaspor in the 2005–06 Turkish Super Lig season.
