= Bülent Ataman =

Turkish footballer

Personal information
- Date of birth: June 14, 1974 (age 52)
- Place of birth: Trabzon, Turkey
- Height: 1.91 m (6 ft 3 in)

Senior career*
Years	Team	Apps	(Gls)
1994–1995	Yeşilyurt Ofspor		
1995–1996	Erzurumspor		
1996–1998	Beşiktaş J.K.		
1997–1998	→ Duzce Cam Duzcespor (loan)		
1998–2003	Göztepe		
2001–2002	→ Trabzonspor (loan)		
2003–2008	Manisaspor		
2008–2009	Altay		
2009–2011	Kardemir Karabükspor		
2011–2012	Karşıyaka		
2012–2014	Fethiyespor		
Medal record
First place	TFF First League	1999
First place	TFF First League	2001
- * Club domestic league appearances and goals

Bülent Ataman (born June 19, 1974) is a Turkish retired footballer. He was last playing for Fethiyespor.

== Career ==
He has previously played for Ofspor, Erzurumspor, Beşiktaş J.K., Düzcespor, Trabzonspor, Göztepe A.Ş., Manisaspor, Altay, Karabükspor and Karşıyaka.

Now, he is an owner of Sporium Center in Tokat.
