= TFF 1. Lig =

Association football league

Trendyol.1 Lig
- Organising body: Turkish Football Federation (TFF)
- Founded: 1963; 63 years ago
- Country: Turkey
- Confederation: UEFA
- Number of clubs: 20
- Level on pyramid: 2
- Promotion to: Süper Lig
- Relegation to: 2. Lig
- Domestic cup: Turkish Cup
- Current champions: Erzurumspor (4th title) (2025–26)
- Most championships: Samsunspor (7 titles)
- Broadcasters: beIN Sports, TRT
- Website: 1. Lig
- Current: 2026–27 TFF 1. Lig

The TFF 1. Lig (lit. 'TFF 1st League'), currently referred to as Trendyol 1. Lig for sponsorship reasons, is the second level of the Turkish football league system. The league was founded in 2001 as the Turkish Second League Category A after the reorganization of the Second Football League, which was the second level of the Turkish league system between 1963 and 2001. The league was called Türk Telekom Lig A in the 2006–07 season, and was renamed to TFF 1. Lig prior to the 2007–08 season. As of 16 January 2008 the league was renamed as Bank Asya 1. Lig. In April 2012 Bank Asya withdrew as sponsor of the league. During the 2012–2016 seasons the league was known under the terms of a sponsorship deal as the PTT 1. Lig.

Before the 2005–06 season, the top three teams were promoted to Süper Lig and the bottom three teams were relegated to the Turkish Second League Category B. Since the 2005–06 season through 2008–09, the top two teams are directly promoted to the Süper Lig, the teams finishing 3rd through 6th competed in a play-off. The third-placed team played a match with the sixth-placed team, while the fourth-placed team played against the fifth-placed team. The winners of both matches then played against each other to decide the third team that was promoted. In 2009–10 the third team was determined by play-off group games, in which the 3rd, 4th, 5th and 6th teams of normal season played in a one-game league system in a neutral venue. In 2010–11 play-off status changed again and elimination match system came back but this time on a two-leg (home and away) basis.

In the 2022–23 season, the 3rd team will advance directly to the play-off final and the teams finishing 4th through 7th will compete in the play-off. The fourth-placed team will play against the seventh-placed team, while the fifth-placed team will play against the sixth-placed team in a one-game format, in the home grounds of the 4th and 5th teams. In the next round, the qualified teams will compete in a two-legged format to advance to the final. The final will be held in a neutral venue.

== Current clubs ==
Location of teams in 2025–26 TFF 1. Lig
Clubs located in Istanbul

Team	Home city/borough	Home province	Stadium	Capacity
Adana Demirspor	Adana	Adana	New Adana Stadium	33,543
Amedspor	Diyarbakır	Diyarbakır	Diyarbakır Stadium	33,000
Bandırmaspor	Bandırma	Balıkesir	17 Eylül Stadium	12,725
Bodrum	Bodrum	Muğla	Bodrum District Stadium	3,925
Boluspor	Bolu	Bolu	Bolu Atatürk Stadium	8,456
Çorum	Çorum	Çorum	Çorum City Stadium	15,000
Erzurumspor	Erzurum	Erzurum	Kazım Karabekir Stadium	21,374
Esenler Erokspor	Esenler	Istanbul	Esenler Stadium	5,296
Hatayspor	Antakya	Hatay	Fuat Tosyalı Stadium	9,800
Iğdır	Iğdır	Iğdır	Iğdır City Stadium	2,700
İstanbulspor	Büyükçekmece	Istanbul	Esenyurt Necmi Kadıoğlu Stadium	7,500
Keçiörengücü	Keçiören	Ankara	Ankara Aktepe Stadium	4,883
Manisa	Manisa	Manisa	Manisa 19 Mayıs Stadium	16,066
Pendikspor	Pendik	Istanbul	Pendik Stadium	2,500
Sakaryaspor	Adapazarı	Sakarya	New Sakarya Stadium	28,154
Sarıyer	Sarıyer	Istanbul	Yusuf Ziya Öniş Stadium	4,100
Serikspor	Serik	Antalya	Serik İsmail Oğan Stadium	2,250
Sivasspor	Sivas	Sivas	New Sivas 4 Eylül Stadium	27,734
Ümraniyespor	Ümraniye	Istanbul	Ümraniye Municipality City Stadium	3,513
Vanspor	Van	Van	Van Atatürk Stadium	5,885

== Winners and promoted clubs ==
Key
**Bold**	Promoted to Süper Lig
	Direct promotion
	Play-off winners
	Play-off finalists

Season	Champions	Runners-up	3rd place
2001–02	**Altay**	**Elazığspor**	**Adanaspor**
2002–03	**Konyaspor**	**Çaykur Rizespor**	**Akçaabat Sebatspor**
2003–04	**Sakaryaspor**	**Kayserispor**	**Ankaraspor**
2004–05	**Sivasspor**	**Manisaspor**	**Kayseri Erciyesspor**

=== Play-off era ===
Season	Champions	Runners-up	3rd place	4th place	5th place	6th place	7th place
2005–06	Bursaspor	Antalyaspor	Altay	**Sakaryaspor**	İstanbulspor	Orduspor	DNQ
2006–07	Gençlerbirliği Oftaş	İstanbul B.B.	Malatyaspor	Diyarbakırspor	**Kasımpaşa**	Altay	DNQ
2007–08	Kocaelispor	Antalyaspor	Sakaryaspor	**Eskişehirspor**	Diyarbakırspor	Boluspor	DNQ
2008–09	Manisaspor	Diyarbakırspor	Boluspor	**Kasımpaşa**	Altay	Karşıyaka	DNQ
2009–10	Karabükspor	Bucaspor	Adanaspor	Altay	Karşıyaka	**Konyaspor**	DNQ
2010–11	Mersin İdman Yurdu	Samsunspor	Gaziantep	Çaykur Rizespor	**Orduspor**	Tavşanlı Linyitspor	DNQ
2011–12	Akhisarspor	Elazığspor	Çaykur Rizespor	**Kasımpaşa**	Konyaspor	Adanaspor	DNQ
2012–13	Kayseri Erciyesspor	Çaykur Rizespor	1461 Trabzon	Manisaspor	Bucaspor	**Konyaspor**	Adana Demirspor
2013–14	İstanbul B.B.	Balıkesirspor	Orduspor	Ankaraspor	Samsunspor	**Mersin İdman Yurdu**	DNQ
2014–15	Kayserispor	Osmanlıspor	Alanyaspor	Adana Demirspor	**Antalyaspor**	Samsunspor	DNQ
2015–16	Adanaspor	Karabükspor	**Alanyaspor**	Adana Demirspor	Elazığspor	Balıkesirspor	DNQ
2016–17	Sivasspor	Malatyaspor	Eskişehirspor	Boluspor	**Göztepe**	Giresunspor	DNQ
2017–18	Çaykur Rizespor	MKE Ankaragücü	Boluspor	Ümraniyespor	**Erzurumspor**	Gaziantep	DNQ
2018–19	Denizlispor	Gençlerbirliği	Hatayspor	Osmanlıspor	**Gaziantep**	Adana Demirspor	DNQ
2019–20	Hatayspor	Erzurumspor	Adana Demirspor	Akhisarspor	**Fatih Karagümrük**	Bursaspor	DNQ
2020–21	Adana Demirspor	Giresunspor	Samsunspor	İstanbulspor	**Altay**	Altınordu	DNQ
2021–22	MKE Ankaragücü	Ümraniyespor	Bandırmaspor	**İstanbulspor**	Erzurumspor	Eyüpspor	DNQ
2022–23	Samsunspor	Çaykur Rizespor	**Pendikspor**	Bodrum	Sakaryaspor	Eyüpspor	Göztepe
2023–24	Eyüpspor	Göztepe	Sakaryaspor	**Bodrum**	Çorum	Kocaelispor	Boluspor
2024–25	Kocaelispor	Gençlerbirliği	**Fatih Karagümrük**	İstanbulspor	Bandırmaspor	Erzurumspor	Boluspor
2025–26	Erzurumspor	Amedspor	Esenler Erokspor	**Çorum**	Bodrumspor	Pendikspor	Keçiörengücü

== Promoted clubs ==
Season	Clubs
2001–02	Vestel Manisaspor, Mersin İdman Yurdu, Adana Demirspor ^{1}
2002–03	Karşıyaka, Türk Telekomspor, Kayseri Erciyesspor
2003–04	Karagümrük Kyoto, Sarıyer, Mardinspor
2004–05	Uşakspor, Orduspor, Gaziantep BŞB.
2005–06	Kasımpaşa, Gençlerbirliği Asaşspor, Eskişehirspor ^{1}
2006–07	Boluspor, Kartalspor, Giresunspor ^{1}
2007–08	Adanaspor, Karabükspor, Güngören Belediyespor ^{1}
2008–09	Bucaspor, Mersin İdman Yurdu, Çanakkale Dardanelspor ^{1}
2009–10	Güngören Belediyespor, Akhisar Belediyespor, Tavşanlı Linyitspor ^{1}
2010–11	Göztepe (White Group), Elazığspor (Red Group), Sakaryaspor ^{1}
2011–12	Şanlıurfaspor (White Group), 1461 Trabzon (Red Group), Adana Demirspor ^{1}
2012–13	Balıkesirspor (White Group), Kahramanmaraşspor (Red Group), Fethiyespor ^{1}, Ankaraspor (Reinstated)
2013–14	Giresunspor (White Group), Altınordu (Red Group), Alanyaspor ^{1}
2014–15	Göztepe (Red Group), Yeni Malatyaspor (White Group), 1461 Trabzon ^{1}
2015–16	Manisaspor (Red Group), Ümraniyespor (White Group), Bandırmaspor ^{1}
2016–17	MKE Ankaragücü (Red Group), Istanbulspor (White Group), Erzurumspor F.K. ^{1}
2017–18	Altay S.K. (White Group), Hatayspor (Red Group), Afjet Afyonspor ^{1}
2018–19	Keçiörengücü (White Group), Menemen Belediyespor (Red Group), Fatih Karagümrük ^{1}
2019–20	Samsunspor (White Group), Bandırmaspor (Red Group), Tuzlaspor ^{1}
2020–21	Manisa (White Group), Eyüpspor (Red Group), Kocaelispor ^{1}
2021–22	Pendikspor (White Group), Sakaryaspor (Red Group), Bodrumspor ^{1}
2022–23	Çorum (White Group), Kocaelispor (Red Group), Şanlıurfaspor ^{1}
2023–24	Amedspor (White Group), Esenler Erokspor (Red Group), Iğdır ^{1}

^{1}Play-off winners.

== Relegated clubs ==
Season	Clubs
2001–02	Hatayspor, Siirt Jetpaspor, Erciyesspor, Batman Petrolspor, Aydınspor
2002–03	Erzurumspor, Gümüşhane Doğanspor, Etimesgut Şekerspor
2003–04	Adana Demirspor, Göztepe, İzmirspor
2004–05	Sarıyer, Adanaspor, Fatih Karagümrük
2005–06	Mersin İdman Yurdu, Yimpaş Yozgatspor, Çanakkale Dardanelspor
2006–07	Türk Telekom, Akçaabat Sebatspor, Uşakspor
2007–08	Elazığspor, İstanbulspor, Mardinspor
2008–09	Sakaryaspor, Güngören Belediyespor, Malatyaspor
2009–10	Hacettepe, Çanakkale Dardanelspor, Kocaelispor
2010–11	Altay, Diyarbakırspor, Ankaraspor (expelled)
2011–12	Giresunspor, Sakaryaspor, İstanbul Güngörenspor
2012–13	Göztepe, Kartalspor, Ankaragücü
2013–14	Fethiyespor, 1461 Trabzon, Tavşanlı Linyitspor, Kahramanmaraşspor
2014–15	Manisaspor, Bucaspor, Orduspor
2015–16	1461 Trabzon, Kayseri Erciyesspor, Karşıyaka
2016–17	Şanlıurfaspor, Bandırmaspor, Mersin İdman Yurdu
2017–18	Samsunspor, Manisaspor, Gaziantepspor
2018–19	Afjet Afyonspor, Elazığspor, Kardemir Karabükspor
2019–20	No relegation due to COVID-19
2020–21	Akhisarspor, Ankaraspor, Eskişehirspor
2021–22	Kocaelispor, Bursaspor, Menemenspor, Balıkesirspor
2022–23	Altınordu, Denizlispor
2023–24	Tuzlaspor, Altay, Giresunspor
2024–25	Adanaspor, Ankaragücü, Şanlıurfaspor, Yeni Malatyaspor
2025–26	Serikspor, Sakaryaspor, Hatayspor, Adana Demirspor

== See also ==
- Süper Lig
- TFF 2. Lig
- TFF 3. Lig
- Turkish Regional Amateur League
- Turkish Amateur Football Leagues
- Turkish Cup
