= Taner Demirbaş =

Turkish footballer

Personal information
- Full name: Taner Demirbaş
- Date of birth: 20 November 1978 (age 47)
- Place of birth: Araklı, Trabzon, Turkey
- Height: 1.78 m (5 ft 10 in)
- Position: Forward

Senior career*
Years	Team	Apps	(Gls)
1995	Erdemirspor	4	(4)
1995–1997	Bursa Merinosspor	52	(23)
1997–1998	Bursaspor	6	(1)
1998–2000	Adıyamanspor	53	(32)
2000	Mobellaspor	12	(2)
2000–2003	Adana Demirspor	90	(84)
2003–2004	Mersin İdmanyurdu	31	(15)
2004–2005	Kayseri Erciyesspor	32	(22)
2005–2008	Malatyaspor	60	(38)
2006	→ Sakaryaspor (loan)	17	(20)
2008	Sakaryaspor	24	(8)
2009	Kayseri Erciyesspor	4	(0)
2009–2010	Alanyaspor	13	(8)
2010	Elazığspor	15	(7)
2010–2011	Bugsaş Spor	21	(7)
2011–2012	Adiyamanspor	12	(3)
Total		441	(274)

International career
1995	Turkey U17	3	(4)
- * Club domestic league appearances and goals as of 18:23, 19 January 2013 (UTC)

Taner Demirbaş (born 20 November 1978) is a Turkish professional footballer who last played as a forward for Adiyamanspor. Demirbaş played for several clubs in Turkey, mostly in the second or third tiers of the league system.

== Career statistics ==
As of 18 February 2011.

Club performance			League		Cup		Total	
Season	Club	League	Apps	Goals	Apps	Goals	Apps	Goals
1994–95	Erdemirspor	TFF Second League	4	4	0	0	4	4
Club total			4	4	0	0	4	4
1995–96	Bursa Merinosspor	TFF Third League	22	8	0	0	22	8
1996–97	Bursa Merinosspor	TFF Third League	30	15	1	2	31	17
Club total			52	23	1	2	53	25
1997–98	Bursaspor	Süper Lig	6	1	0	0	6	1
Club total			6	1	0	0	6	1
1997–98	Adıyamanspor	TFF Second League	10	0	0	0	10	0
1998–99	Adıyamanspor	TFF Second League	30	21	1	1	31	22
1999–2000	Adıyamanspor	TFF Second League	13	11	0	0	13	11
Club total			53	32	1	1	54	33
1999–2000	Mobellaspor	TFF Second League	12	2	0	0	12	2
Club total			12	2	0	0	12	2
2000–01	Adana Demirspor	TFF Third League	30	39	0	0	30	39
2001–02	Adana Demirspor	TFF Second League	28	26	0	0	28	26
2002–03	Adana Demirspor	TFF First League	32	19	0	0	32	19
Club total			90	84	0	0	90	84
2003–04	Mersin İdmanyurdu	TFF First League	32	15	1	0	32	15
Club total			32	15	1	0	32	15
2004–05	Kayseri Erciyesspor	TFF First League	32	22	2	2	34	24
Club total			32	22	2	2	34	24
2005–06	Malatyaspor	Süper Lig	8	0	3	0	11	0
2005–06	→ Sakaryaspor (loan)	TFF First League	17	20	0	0	17	20
Club total			17	20	0	0	17	20
2006–07	Malatyaspor	TFF First League	33	27	0	0	33	27
2007–08	Malatyaspor	TFF First League	19	11	1	0	20	11
Club total			60	38	4	0	64	38
2007–08	Sakaryaspor	TFF First League	15	8	0	0	15	8
2008–09	Sakaryaspor	TFF First League	9	0	1	2	10	2
Club total			24	8	1	2	25	10
2008–09	Kayseri Erciyesspor	TFF First League	4	0	0	0	4	0
Club total			4	0	0	0	4	0
2009–10	Alanyaspor	TFF Second League	13	8	0	0	13	8
Club total			13	8	0	0	13	8
2009–10	Elazığspor	TFF Second League	15	7	0	0	15	7
Club total			15	7	0	0	15	7
2010–11	Bugsaş Spor	TFF Second League	18	7	0	0	18	7
Club total			21	7	0	0	21	7
2011–12	Adiyamanspor	TFF Second League	12	3	0	0	12	3
Career total			446	274	10	7	456	281
