= Yıldırım Bosna S.K. =

Turkish football club

- Full name: Yıldırım Bosna Spor Kulübü
- Nickname: thunders
- Founded: 1945
- Ground: Bayrampaşa Çetin Emeç Stadı, Bayrampaşa; Istanbul
- Capacity: 1,200
- League: TFF Third League
- Website: https://web.archive.org/web/20090825232404/http://yildirimbosnaspor.org:80/
Home colours	Away colours

Yıldırım Bosna SK is a football club from the Bayrampaşa neighborhood of Istanbul. The club was founded by migrant Turkish citizens who had migrated from the Balkans to Istanbul. Its original name was Altınçam. It then took several names including Sönmez Gençler and Yıldırım Genç Spor. After the Military Regime took control in 1980, the club was closed due to its connections with minorities. It was reestablished with the merge of Bosna SK and Yıldırım İdman Yurdu. The reestablished club played third-level football between 2001 and 2006. They competed in the fourth tier TFF Third League 1st group for the 2008 – 2009 season.

In 2018 a young man was stabbed to death during an altercation prior to a match to be played against Küçükköyspor. The team withdrew from the remaining games in the season.
