= Akçaabat Sebatspor =

Turkish football club

- Full name: Akçaabat Sebatspor
- Founded: 1923
- Dissolved: 2018
- Ground: Akçaabat Fatih Stadyumu, Trabzon, Turkey
- Capacity: 6,238
- Chairman: Cemil Kalkışım
- Manager: Mehmet Birinci
- League: Trabzon 1st Amateur
- 2014–15: 4th
Home colours	Away colours

Akçaabat Sebatspor was a Turkish football club located in the Akçaabat district of Trabzon Province. They played their home games in the Akçaabat Fatih Stadyumu. The club was founded in 1923.

== History ==
Akçaabat Sebatspor were founded as Sebat İdman Yurdu in 1923 in Akcaabat, Trabzon, Turkey. They are among the ten oldest football clubs in Turkey despite being a team of a relatively small town. The first kits sported the colors of the nations flag, red and white. The team changed its name to Akcaabat Genclik in 1940, and then to Sebat Genclik in 1947. Sebatspor were promoted to the professional leagues in 1968 as Sebat Gençlik Kulübü. They started in the TFF 3rd League. They spent several seasons in the Third Division, before being promoted to the Turkish Second Division as champions in 1978. During the 1981–82 season, Sebatspor were almost promoted to the Super League, finishing one point behind Samsunspor. The club changed its name to the current form, Akçaabat Sebatspor in 1986. The club was relegated to the Third Division in 1991, but quickly bounced back and were promoted to the Second Division the next season.

The club spent one season in the Second Division before being relegated again in 1993. After years of struggling, influential businessman and philanthropist Mevlüt Selami Yardım took the helms as a chairman. He put tremendous financial and personal effort for the team to recoup its historical valour. It was until 2000 that the club would be promoted to the Second Division once more after a dramatic as well as a miraculous play-off against Balikesirspor. Three years later, Sebatspor were promoted to the Süper Lig for the first time in the club's history. This was a major achievement in the sense that for the first time in Turkish football history, a town team (other than that of Istanbul, Ankara and Izmir) was promoted to the Turkish Premier Division. In their first season Sebatspor achieved an ecstatic escape from relegation to the surprise of almost everybody. The stay, however, did not last long as they were subsequently relegated at the end of the Super League 2004–05 season. In 2007, the club was relegated to the TFF Second League.

== Honours ==
- Prime Minister's Cup
  - Runners-up: 1969
- TFF First League
  - Third place: 2002–03

== Past seasons ==
Year	Division	Position	P	W	D	L	Goals	Pts
2002–03	Turkish First Division	3	34	19	7	8	61–39	64
2003–04	Süper Lig	13	34	11	9	14	45–53	42
2004–05	Süper Lig	18	34	3	10	21	40–78	19
2005–06	Turkish First Division	15	34	7	13	14	37–54	34
2006–07	Turkish First Division	17	34	8	8	18	40–65	32
2007–08	Iddaa League B	2	32	11	10	11	38–41	43
2008–09	Iddaa League B	4	36	14	10	12	43–41	52
2009–10	Iddaa League B	3	38	17	5	16	52–59	56
2010–11	Iddaa League B	16	34	8	10	16	32–53	34
2011–12	Turkish Third League	19	36	2	1	33	19–105	7
2012–13	Turkish Regional Amateur League	8	28	11	6	11	44–37	39
2013–14	Trabzon 1st Amateur Play-Off	4	9	4	4	1	20–13	16
2014–15	Trabzon 1st Amateur Play-Off	4	9	4	2	3	15–13	14
