= Malatyaspor =

Turkish sports club

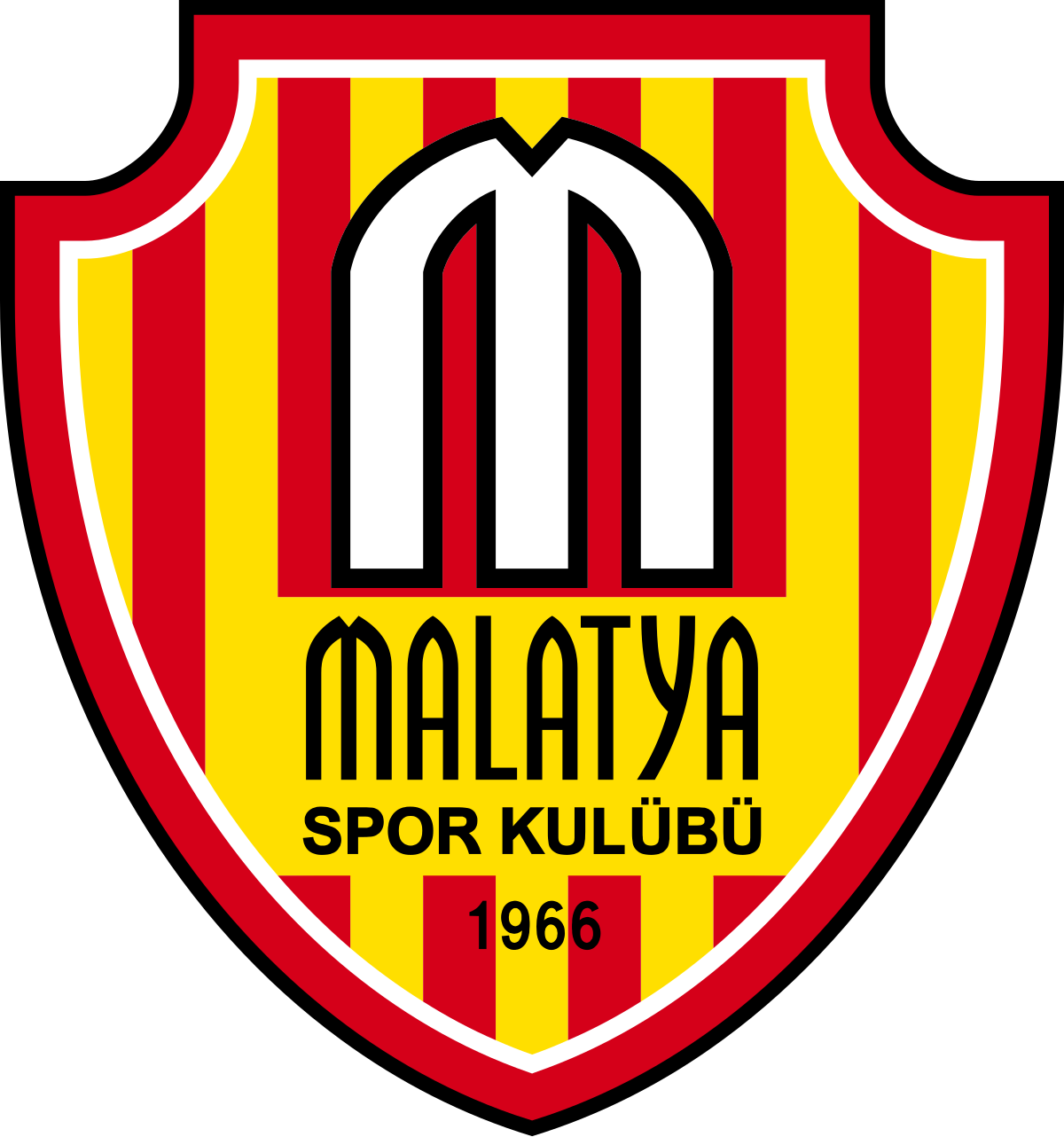
- Full name: Malatya Spor Kulübü
- Nickname: Tigers of the East
- Founded: 1966; 59 years ago
- Ground: Yeşiltepe Sports Complex, Malatya
- Capacity: 500
- Chairman: Muhammed Furkan Güner
- Manager: Orhan Özdemir
- League: Turkish Regional Amateur League, Group III
- 2023–24: Turkish Regional Amateur League, 4th of 13, Group XI
Home colours	Away colours

Malatya Spor Kulübü is a Turkish sports club based in Malatya, mainly concentrated on football.

== History ==
Prior to 1984 the club colors were yellow and black. They played for 11 seasons on the top-level of Turkish football. Their best result was finishing 1st League (Now Super Lig) as 3rd in 1987–88 season. The club was the first team from the Eastern Anatolia region to qualify for a European cup, 2003–04 UEFA Cup. They relegated to amateur level after the matches of 31 March 2011. At the end of the 2011–2012 season the club finally relegated to Malatya First Amateur League after five successive relegations due to financial mismanagement.

Malatyaspor managed three times to qualify for the semi-finals of the Turkish Cup: 1987, 1989 and 2003.

== League participations ==
- Turkish Super League: 1984–90, 2001–06
- TFF First League: 1967–68, 1973–77, 1980–84, 1990–01, 2006–09
- TFF Second League: 1968–73, 1977–80, 2009–10
- TFF Third League: 2010–11
- Turkish Regional Amateur League: 2011–12, 2023–
- Amatör Futbol Ligleri: 2012–2023

== Honours ==
- TFF First League
  - Winners (1): 1983–84
- TFF Third League
  - Winners (1): 1972–73
- Amatör Futbol Ligleri:
  - Winners (1): 2022–23

== European Cups ==
As of 15 October 2003

Competition	Pld	W	D	L	GF	GA	GD
UEFA Cup	2	1	0	1	2	3	–1

UEFA Cup:

Season	Round	Club	Home	Away	Aggregate
2003–04	1R	(Switzerland) FC Basel	0–2	2–1 (aet)	2–3

UEFA Ranking history:

As of 2008

Season	Rank	Points	Ref.
2004	155 ▲	12.656	
2005	164 ▼	11.872	
2006	180 ▼	10.634	
2007	167 ▲	10.791	
2008	149 ▲	12.469	
