= Yozgatspor =

Turkish sports club

- Full name: Yozgatspor Kulübü
- Nickname: Bozoklar (Grey Arrows)
- Founded: 23 January 1959
- Dissolved: 2015
- Ground: Bozok Stadium, Yozgat
- Capacity: 8,640
- Chairman: musti cevik
- Manager: mirac cevik
- League: Turkish Regional Amateur League
- 2014–15: Turkish Regional Amateur League 6th Group, 3rd
- Website: yozgatspor.org.tr
Home colours	Away colours

Yozgatspor was a Turkish sports club based in Yozgat, Turkey. The football club played in the TFF Third League. They played in the Süper Lig between 2000 and 2002 and relegated to the Third League in the 2008–09 season. They finally relegated to the Turkish Regional Amateur League and lost professional status. Between 1997 and 2008, the club was named Yimpaş Yozgatspor.

== League participation ==
- Turkish Super League: 2000–02
- TFF First League: 1992–94, 1995–00, 2002–06
- TFF Second League: 1984–92, 1994–95, 2006–09
- TFF Third League: 2009–2014
- Turkish Regional Amateur League: 2014–2015
- Amateur Leagues: 1959–1984

== Honours ==
TFF First League

Winners (1): 1999–2000

TFF Second League

Winners (2): 1991–92, 1994–95
