= 2006–07 Fenerbahçe S.K. season =

Fenerbahçe
2006–07 season
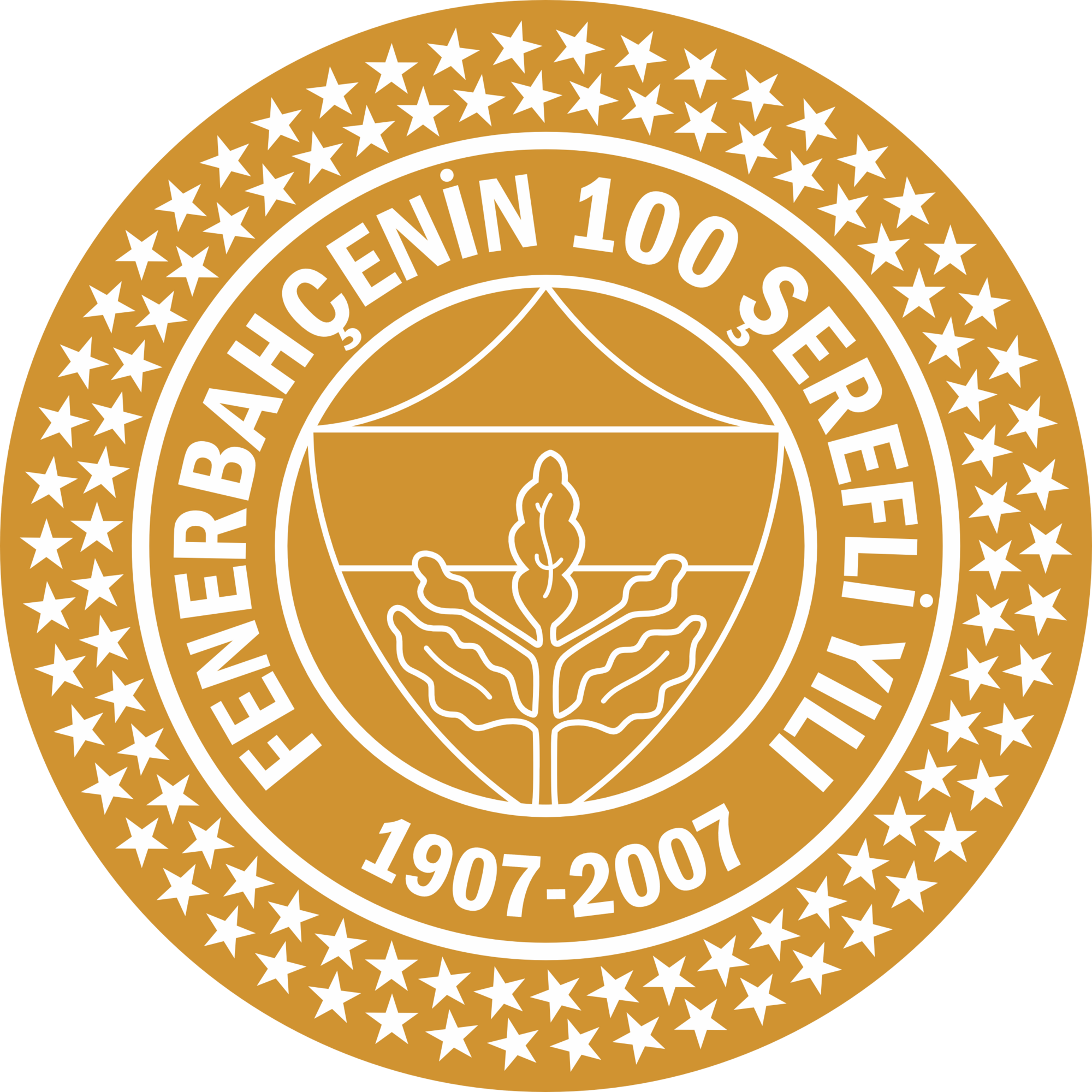
- Fenerbahçe 100th anniversary logo
- President: Aziz Yıldırım
- Head coach: Zico
- Stadium: Şükrü Saracoğlu Stadium
- Süper Lig: Champions
- Turkish Cup: Semi-finals
- UEFA Champions League: Third qualifying round
- UEFA Cup: Round of 32
- Top goalscorer: League: Alex (19); All: Alex (20)
- Highest home attendance: 44,283 (vs. Galatasaray, 21 September 2024, Süper Lig)
- Lowest home attendance: 26,744 (vs. Hatayspor, 5 January 2025, Süper Lig)
- Biggest win: 6–0 (vs. Kayseri Erciyesspor (H), 5 August 2006, Süper Lig)
- Biggest defeat: 3–1 (vs. Dynamo Kyiv (A), 9 August 2006, UEFA Champions League)
Home colours	Away colours	Third colours

The 2006–07 season was the 100th season in the existence of Fenerbahçe, and the club's 49th consecutive season in the top flight of Turkish football. In addition to the domestic league, Fenerbahçe participated in this season's edition of the Turkish Cup, UEFA Champions League and UEFA Cup.

== Kits ==
Fenerbahçe's 2006–07 kits, manufactured by Adidas, were unveiled on 3 August 2006 and went on sale on the next day.

- Supplier: Adidas
- Main sponsor: Avea
- Sleeve sponsor: Cola Turka
- Back sponsor: –
- Short sponsor: –
- Socks sponsor: –

Home
Home alt.
Away
Away alt.
Third

== Players ==
Note: Flags indicate national team as defined under FIFA eligibility rules; some limited exceptions apply. Players may hold more than one non-FIFA nationality.

No.	Pos.	Nation	Player
1	GK	TUR	Volkan Demirel
4	MF	GHA	Stephen Appiah
5	DF	TUR	Ümit Özat (Captain)
7	FW	TUR	Mehmet Yozgatlı
9	FW	SRB	Mateja Kežman
10	FW	TUR	Tuncay Şanlı
11	MF	TUR	Tümer Metin
15	MF	TUR	Mehmet Aurelio
16	MF	TUR	Kerim Zengin
17	DF	TUR	Can Arat
19	DF	TUR	Önder Turacı
20	MF	BRA	Alex

No.	Pos.	Nation	Player
21	MF	TUR	Selçuk Şahin
22	GK	TUR	Serdar Kulbilge
23	FW	TUR	Semih Şentürk
24	DF	TUR	Deniz Barış
25	MF	TUR	Uğur Boral
27	MF	TUR	Kemal Aslan
29	MF	TUR	Olcan Adın
30	DF	TUR	Serkan Balcı
34	GK	TUR	Rüştü Reçber
35	DF	URU	Diego Lugano
36	DF	BRA	Edu Dracena
99	FW	BRA	Deivid

== Transfers ==
=== In ===
No.	Pos.	Player	Transferred from	Fee	Date	Source
Summer
11	MF	(Turkey) Tümer Metin	(Turkey) Beşiktaş	Free transfer	30 May 2006	
—	MF	(Turkey) Murat Hacıoğlu	(Turkey) Konyaspor	Loan return	1 July 2006	
—	GK	(Turkey) Recep Biler	(Turkey) Karşıyaka	Loan return	1 July 2006	
—	MF	(Turkey) Onur Tuncer	(Turkey) Antalyaspor	Loan return	1 July 2006	
25	MF	(Turkey) Uğur Boral	(Turkey) Gençlerbirliği	Free transfer	1 July 2006	
—	MF	(Brazil) Mateus Paraná	(Brazil) Iraty	Free transfer	1 July 2006	
34	GK	(Turkey) Rüştü Reçber	(Spain) Barcelona	Free transfer	4 July 2006	
35	DF	(Uruguay) Diego Lugano	(Brazil) São Paulo	€7,500,000	21 August 2006	
9	FW	(Serbia) Mateja Kežman	(Spain) Atlético Madrid	€7,000,000	28 August 2006	
36	DF	(Brazil) Edu Dracena	(Brazil) Cruzeiro	€5,700,000	29 August 2006	
99	FW	(Brazil) Deivid	(Portugal) Sporting	€4,500,000	1 September 2006	

=== Out ===
No.	Pos.	Player	Transferred to	Fee	Date	Source
Summer
—	MF	(Turkey) Mert Nobre	(Brazil) Cruzeiro	Loan return	1 July 2006	
—	MF	(Turkey) Onur Tuncer	(Turkey) Mardinspor	Loan	1 August 2006	
—	MF	(Brazil) Mateus Paraná	(Brazil) Iraty	Free transfer	1 August 2006	
8	FW	(Turkey) Zafer Biryol	(Turkey) Bursaspor	Free transfer	15 August 2006	
—	GK	(Turkey) Recep Biler	(Turkey) Karşıyaka	Loan	17 August 2006	
39	FW	(France) Nicolas Anelka	(England) Bolton Wandereres	€12,000,000	26 August 2006	
11	MF	(Turkey) Murat Hacıoğlu	(Turkey) Ankaraspor	Free transfer	28 August 2006	
3	DF	(Turkey) Servet Çetin	(Turkey) Sivasspor	Free transfer	30 August 2006	
18	MF	(Turkey) Gürhan Gürsoy	(Turkey) Sivasspor	Free transfer	30 August 2006	
6	DF	(Turkey) Mahmut Hanefi Erdoğdu	(Turkey) Gaziantepspor	Loan	31 August 2006	

== Pre-season and friendlies ==
3 April 2007	Al-Ittihad (Syria)	2–2	(Turkey) Fenerbahçe	Aleppo, Syria
20:30 UTC+3	Al Agha 8'; Dmitri 83'	Report	Şentürk 13'; Barış 88'	Stadium: Aleppo International Stadium; Attendance: ~75,000

== Competitions ==
=== Overall record ===
Competition	First match	Last match	Starting round	Final position	Record							
Competition	First match	Last match	Starting round	Final position	Pld	W	D	L	GF	GA	GD	Win %
Süper Lig	5 August 2006	26 May 2007	Matchday 1	Winners	34	20	10	4	65	31	+34	58.82
Turkish Cup	26 October 2006	2006 April 2007	Group stage	Semifinals	8	6	1	1	21	3	+18	75.00
UEFA Champions League	26 July 2006	23 August 2006	Second qualifying round	Third qualifying round	4	2	1	1	12	5	+7	50.00
UEFA Cup	19 October 2006	22 February 2007	Group stage	Round of 32	6	1	3	2	10	9	+1	16.67
Total					52	29	15	8	108	48	+60	55.77

Source: Competitions

=== Süper Lig ===
==== League table ====
Pos	Team	Pld	W	D	L	GF	GA	GD	Pts	Qualification or relegation
1	Fenerbahçe (C)	34	20	10	4	65	31	+34	70	Qualification to Champions League third qualifying round
2	Beşiktaş	34	18	7	9	43	32	+11	61	Qualification to Champions League second qualifying round
3	Galatasaray	34	15	11	8	58	37	+21	56	Qualification to UEFA Cup second qualifying round
4	Trabzonspor	34	15	7	12	54	44	+10	52	Qualification to Intertoto Cup second round
5	Kayserispor	34	13	12	9	54	43	+11	51	

Source: Süper Lig
Rules for classification: 1) points; 2) goal difference; 3) number of goals scored.
(C) Champions

==== Results summary ====
Overall								Home						Away					
Pld	W	D	L	GF	GA	GD	Pts	W	D	L	GF	GA	GD	W	D	L	GF	GA	GD
34	20	10	4	65	31	+34	70	11	5	1	39	16	+23	9	5	3	26	15	+11

Source: TFF.org

Pld = Matches played; W = Matches won; D = Matches drawn; L = Matches lost; GF = Goals for; GA = Goals against; GD = Goal difference; Pts = Points

==== Results by round ====
Round	1	2	3	4	5	6	7	8	9	10	11	12	13	14	15	16	17	18	19	20	21	22	23	24	25	26	27	28	29	30	31	32	33	34
Ground	H	A	H	A	H	A	A	H	A	H	A	H	A	H	A	H	A	A	H	A	H	A	H	H	A	H	A	H	A	H	A	H	A	H
Result	W	W	W	L	W	D	W	L	D	W	W	W	D	D	W	W	W	D	W	L	W	L	D	W	W	W	D	D	W	D	W	D	W	W
Position	1	1	1	1	1	2	2	2	2	2	1	1	1	1	1	1	1	1	1	1	1	1	1	1	1	1	1	1	1	1	1	1	1	1

Source: TFF.org
A = Away; H = Home; W = Win; D = Draw; L = Loss; P = Postponed

==== Matches ====
5 August 2006 1	Fenerbahçe	6–0	Kayseri Erciyesspor	Istanbul
21.30	Tuncay 14'; Alex 27, 71, 85'; Tümer 75'; Murat 80'			Stadium: Şükrü Saracoğlu Stadium; Referee: Bülent Demirlek

12 August 2006 2	Gençlerbirliği	0–2	Fenerbahçe	Ankara
20.00			35' Tuncay; 39' Alex	Stadium: Ankara 19 Mayıs Stadium; Referee: Yunus Yıldırım

19 August 2006 3	Fenerbahçe	2–1	Çaykur Rizespor	Istanbul
21.45	Alex 44'; Tümer 63'		77' Cem	Stadium: Şükrü Saracoğlu Stadium; Referee: Bülent Yıldırım

27 August 2006 4	Sakaryaspor	2–1	Fenerbahçe	Sakarya
21.45	Okan 56'; Musa 90+1'		90+2' Selçuk	Stadium: Sakarya Atatürk Stadium; Referee: Kuddusi Müftüoğlu

9 September 2006 5	Fenerbahçe	4–2	Antalyaspor	Istanbul
19.00	Lugano 68, 76'; Tuncay 72'; Alex 89'		70' Bieniuk; 82' Ali	Stadium: Şükrü Saracoğlu Stadium; Referee: Hüseyin Göçek

17 September 2006 6	Sivasspor	1–1	Fenerbahçe	Sivas
19.00	Gökhan 34'		16' Kežman	Stadium: 4 Eylül Stadium; Referee: İsmet Arzuman

22 September 2006 7	Konyaspor	0–1	Fenerbahçe	Konya
20.00			31' Kežman	Stadium: Konya Atatürk Stadium; Referee: Yunus Yıldırım

1 October 2006 8	Fenerbahçe	0–1	Bursaspor	Istanbul
20.30			16' Sinan	Stadium: Şükrü Saracoğlu Stadium; Referee: Bülent Yıldırım

15 October 2006 9	Ankaraspor	2–2	Fenerbahçe	Ankara
14.30	Jaba 50'; Mehmet 59'		20' Alex; 24' Lugano	Stadium: Ankara 19 Mayıs Stadium; Referee: Vedat Yüksel

22 October 2006 10	Fenerbahçe	4–1	Kayserispor	Istanbul
20.00	Mehmet 12'; Kežman 22'; Alex 60, 88'		55' İlhan	Stadium: Şükrü Saracoğlu Stadium; Referee: İsmet Arzuman

29 October 2006 11	Vestel Manisaspor	2–3	Fenerbahçe	Manisa
19.00	Hološko 24'; Burak 85'		19, 38, 55' Deivid	Stadium: Manisa 19 Mayıs Stadium; Referee: Selçuk Dereli

3 November 2006 12	Fenerbahçe	4–1	Gaziantepspor	Istanbul
20.00	Appiah 46'; Alex 58'; Deivid 64'; Tümer 89'		55' Drinčić	Stadium: Şükrü Saracoğlu Stadium; Referee: Cüneyt Çakır

10 November 2006 13	Denizlispor	0–0	Fenerbahçe	Denizli
20.00				Stadium: Denizli Atatürk Stadium; Referee: Bülent Yıldırım

19 November 2006 14	Fenerbahçe	0–0	Beşiktaş	Istanbul
19.00				Stadium: Şükrü Saracoğlu Stadium; Referee: Vedat Yüksel

26 November 2006 15	Trabzonspor	1–2	Fenerbahçe	Trabzon
19.00	Umut 69'		17' Appiah; 72' Aurélio	Stadium: Hüseyin Avni Aker Stadium; Referee: Bülent Demirlek

3 December 2006 16	Fenerbahçe	2–1	Galatasaray	Istanbul
19.00	Alex 24'; Kežman 25'		54' Ümit	Stadium: Şükrü Saracoğlu Stadium; Referee: Selçuk Dereli

8 December 2006 17	MKE Ankaragücü	0–1	Fenerbahçe	İzmir
20.00			37' Appiah	Stadium: İzmir Atatürk Stadium; Referee: Halis Özkahya

26 January 2007 18	Kayseri Erciyesspor	1–1	Fenerbahçe	Kayseri
20.00	Cenk 35'		82' Alex	Stadium: Kayseri Atatürk Stadium; Referee: Yunus Yıldırım

2 February 2007 19	Fenerbahçe	2–1	Gençlerbirliği	İzmir
20.00	Tuncay 9'; Aurélio 57'		21' Mehmet	Stadium: İzmir Atatürk Stadium; Referee: Tolga Özkalfa

10 February 2007 20	Çaykur Rizespor	2–1	Fenerbahçe	Rize
16.00	Zafer 5' (pen.); Ferdi 18'		69' Semih	Stadium: Rize Atatürk Stadium; Referee: Selçuk Dereli

18 February 2007 21	Fenerbahçe	1–0	Sakaryaspor	Istanbul
19.00	Tümer 18'			Stadium: Şükrü Saracoğlu Stadium; Referee: Bülent Yıldırım

25 February 2007 22	Antalyaspor	1–0	Fenerbahçe	Antalya
19.00	Ali 46'			Stadium: Antalya Atatürk Stadium; Referee: Vedat Yüksel

4 March 2007 23	Fenerbahçe	2–2	Sivasspor	Istanbul
19.00	Tuncay 15'; Mehmet 67'		19' Cem; 37' Servet	Stadium: Şükrü Saracoğlu Stadium; Referee: Cem Deda

10 March 2007 24	Fenerbahçe	3–0	Konyaspor	Istanbul
19.00	Aurélio 45'; Kežman 55'; Alex 60'			Stadium: Şükrü Saracoğlu Stadium; Referee: Aytekin Durmaz

17 March 2007 25	Bursaspor	0–4	Fenerbahçe	Bursa
19.00			48, 77' Alex; 50' Kežman; 62' Deniz	Stadium: Bursa Atatürk Stadium; Referee: Mustafa Kamil Abitoğlu

1 April 2007 26	Fenerbahçe	2–1	Ankaraspor	Istanbul
15.00	Alex 44'; Tuncay 72'		21' (pen.) Vederson	Stadium: Şükrü Saracoğlu Stadium; Referee: Yunus Yıldırım

7 April 2007 27	Kayserispor	2–2	Fenerbahçe	Kayseri
18.30	Iglesias 44'; Kemal 69'		13' Tuncay; 88' Deivid	Stadium: Kayseri Atatürk Stadium; Referee: Vedat Yüksel

15 April 2007 28	Fenerbahçe	0–0	Vestel Manisaspor	Istanbul
19.00				Stadium: Şükrü Saracoğlu Stadium; Referee: İsmet Arzuman

20 April 2007 29	Gaziantepspor	0–2	Fenerbahçe	Gaziantep
20.00			29' (pen.) Alex; 57' Tuncay	Stadium: Kamil Ocak Stadium; Referee: Mustafa Kamil Abitoğlu

29 April 2007 30	Fenerbahçe	2–2	Denizlispor	Istanbul
19.00	Alex 19' (71), pen.'		73' Adriano; 80' Fatih	Stadium: Şükrü Saracoğlu Stadium; Referee: Hüseyin Göçek

5 May 2007 31	Beşiktaş	0–1	Fenerbahçe	Istanbul
21.00			13' Kežman	Stadium: BJK İnönü Stadium; Referee: Fırat Aydınus

13 May 2007 32	Fenerbahçe	2–2	Trabzonspor	İzmir
19.00	Tuncay 3'; Deivid 85'		2' Hüseyin; 42' Yattara	Stadium: İzmir Atatürk Stadium; Referee: Mustafa Kamil Abitoğlu

19 May 2007 33	Galatasaray	1–2	Fenerbahçe	Istanbul
19.00	Arda 86'		22' Lugano; 38' Edu	Stadium: Ali Sami Yen Stadium; Referee: Bülent Demirlek

26 May 2007 34	Fenerbahçe	3–1	MKE Ankaragücü	Istanbul
20.30	Ümit 54'; Kežman 62, 80'		35' Bebbe	Stadium: Şükrü Saracoğlu Stadium; Referee: Yunus Yıldırım

=== Turkish Cup ===
==== Group C ====
Pos	Team	Pld	W	D	L	GF	GA	GD	Pts
1	Fenerbahçe	4	4	0	0	17	0	+17	12
2	Gaziantepspor	4	3	0	1	7	2	+5	9
3	İnegölspor	4	1	1	2	5	14	−9	4
4	Sivasspor	4	1	0	3	2	8	−6	3
5	Istanbul B.B.	4	0	1	3	2	9	−7	1

Source: TFF.org

26 October 2006 1	Fenerbahçe	2–0	Gaziantepspor	Istanbul
19:00	Deivid 79'; Şentürk 87'	Report		Stadium: Şükrü Saracoğlu Stadium; Referee: Aytekin Durmaz

7 November 2006 2	Sivasspor	0–4	Fenerbahçe	Sivas
20:00		Report	14', 79' Deivid; 30', 72' Şentürk	Stadium: 4 Eylül Stadium; Referee: Tolga Özkalfa

19 December 2006 3	Fenerbahçe	6–0	İnegölspor	Istanbul
20:00	Adın 3'; Deivid 21'; Şentürk 29', 55'; Yozgatlı 81'; Metin 87'	Report		Stadium: Şükrü Saracoğlu Stadium; Referee: Bünyamin Gezer

20 January 2007 4	İstanbul BB	0–5	Fenerbahçe	Istanbul
19:00		Report	10', 34' Deivid; 40' Şanlı; 77' Şentürk; 88' Yozgatlı	Stadium: Atatürk Olympic Stadium; Referee: M. Cemil Şensöz

==== Quarter-finals ====
30 January 2007 1	Fenerbahçe	2–1	Gençlerbirliği	Istanbul
20:00	Yozgatlı 45'; Şentürk 89'	Report	56' Çakır	Stadium: Şükrü Saracoğlu Stadium; Referee: Fırat Aydınus

1 March 2007 2	Gençlerbirliği	0–1	Fenerbahçe	Ankara
20:00		Report	10' Yozgatlı	Stadium: Ankara 19 Mayıs Stadium; Referee: Yunus Yıldırım

==== Semi-finals ====
11 April 2007 1	Beşiktaş	1–0	Fenerbahçe	Istanbul
20:00	Bobô 82'	Report		Stadium: BJK İnönü Stadium; Referee: Fırat Aydınus

26 April 2007 2	Fenerbahçe	1–1 (a.e.t.)	Beşiktaş	Istanbul
20:00	Metin 56'	Report	102' Nobre	Stadium: Şükrü Saracoğlu Stadium; Referee: Selçuk Dereli

=== UEFA Champions League ===
==== Second qualifying round ====
26 July 2006 1	Fenerbahçe (Turkey)	4–0	(Faroe Islands) B36	Istanbul
21:00 EEST (UTC+3)	Appiah 26'; Tümer 39'; Tuncay 54'; Önder 90+3'	Report		Stadium: Şükrü Saracoğlu Stadium; Attendance: 34,500; Referee: Edo Trivković (Croatia)

1 August 2006 2	B36 (Faroe Islands)	0–5	(Turkey) Fenerbahçe	Tórshavn, Faroe Islands
18:30 WEST (UTC+1)		Report	44' Tuncay; 49' Mehmet; 79' Can; 83' Semih; 90' Murat	Stadium: Tórsvøllur; Attendance: 1,548; Referee: Ceri Richards (Wales)

==== Third qualifying round ====
9 August 2006 1	Dynamo Kyiv (Ukraine)	3–1	(Turkey) Fenerbahçe	Kyiv
19:00 EEST (UTC+3)	Rincon 1, 67'; Yussuf 83'	Report	48' Aurélio	Stadium: Valeriy Lobanovskyi Dynamo Stadium; Attendance: 16,873; Referee: Darko Čeferin (Slovenia)

23 August 2006 2	Fenerbahçe (Turkey)	2–2	(Ukraine) Dynamo Kyiv	Istanbul
21:00 EEST (UTC+3)	Appiah 36'; Kerim 57'	Report	5, 42' Shatskikh	Stadium: Şükrü Saracoğlu Stadium; Attendance: 42,836; Referee: Steve Bennett (England)

=== UEFA Cup ===
==== First round ====
14 September 2006 1	Fenerbahçe (Turkey)	2–1	(Denmark) Randers	Istanbul
	Pedersen 24' (o.g.); Kežman 54'	Report	13' Fall	Stadium: Şükrü Saracoğlu Stadium; Referee: Franz-Xaver Wack (Germany)

28 September 2006 2	Randers (Denmark)	0–3	(Turkey) Fenerbahçe	Aarhus
		Report	61' Deivid; 64' Tuncay; 70' Kežman	Stadium: NRGi Park; Referee: Pedro Proença (Portugal)

==== Group stage ====
Pos	Team	Pld	W	D	L	GF	GA	GD	Pts	Qualification
1	(England) Newcastle United	4	3	1	0	4	1	+3	10	Advance to knockout stage
2	(Spain) Celta Vigo	4	1	2	1	4	4	0	5	Advance to knockout stage
3	(Turkey) Fenerbahçe	4	1	1	2	5	4	+1	4	Advance to knockout stage
4	(Italy) Palermo	4	1	1	2	3	6	−3	4	
5	(Germany) Eintracht Frankfurt	4	0	3	1	4	5	−1	3	

19 October 2006 1	Newcastle United (England)	1–0	(Turkey) Fenerbahçe	Newcastle
	Sibierski 61'	Report		Stadium: St James' Park; Referee: Grzegorz Gilewski (Poland)

23 November 2006 2	Fenerbahçe (Turkey)	3–0	(Italy) Palermo	Istanbul
	Appiah 20'; Lugano 62'; Tuncay 83'	Report		Stadium: Şükrü Saracoğlu Stadium; Referee: Lucílio Batista (Portugal)

30 November 2006 3	Celta Vigo (Spain)	1–0	(Turkey) Fenerbahçe	Vigo
	Canobbio 20'	Report		Stadium: Balaídos; Referee: Paul Allaerts (Belgium)

13 December 2006 4	Fenerbahçe (Turkey)	2–2	(Germany) Eintracht Frankfurt	Istanbul
	Tuncay 64'; Semih 83'	Report	7', 52' Takahara	Stadium: Şükrü Saracoğlu Stadium; Referee: Jan Wegereef (Netherlands)

==== Round of 32 ====
14 February 2007 1	Fenerbahçe (Turkey)	3–3	(Netherlands) AZ Alkmaar	Istanbul
	Tümer 27, 73'; Tuncay 65'	Report	15' de Zeeuw; 62' Boukhari; 63' Jenner	Stadium: Şükrü Saracoğlu Stadium; Referee: Eduardo Iturralde González (Spain)

22 February 2007 2	AZ Alkmaar (Netherlands)	2–2	(Turkey) Fenerbahçe	Alkmaar
	Mertens 63'; Opdam 86'	Report	21' Tümer; 34' Alex	Stadium: AFAS Stadion; Referee: Knut Kircher (Germany)
