= List of Turkish football transfers 2007–08 =

This is a list of Turkish football transfers for the 2007–08 season. Only moves from the Süper Lig are listed.

== Summer transfer window ==
=== May ===
Date	Name	Nat	Moving from	Moving to	Fee
May 25, 2007	Ümit Özat	(Turkey)	Fenerbahçe S.K.	1. FC Köln	€700,000
May 28, 2007	Savas Esen	(Turkey)	Alibeykoyspor	Gençlerbirliği S.K.	Undisclosed
May 28, 2007	Samuel Johnson	(Ghana)	Kayserispor	—	Free
May 28, 2007	Marcelo Mendez	(Uruguay)	Kayserispor	—	Free
May 28, 2007	Eder	(Brazil)	Kayserispor	—	Free
May 29, 2007	Junichi Inamoto	(Japan)	Galatasaray S.K.	Eintracht Frankfurt	Free
May 29, 2007	Rodrigo Tello	(Chile)	Sporting CP	Beşiktaş J.K.	Undisclosed
May 31, 2007	Olgay Coskun	(Turkey)	Karşıyaka S.K.	Gençlerbirliği S.K.	Undisclosed
May 31, 2007	Faryd Aly Mondragón	(Colombia)	Galatasaray S.K.	1. FC Köln	Free
May 31, 2007	Alex Yordanov	(Bulgaria)	Ankaragücü	—	Free
May 31, 2007	Ivaylo Petkov	(Bulgaria)	Ankaragücü	—	Free
May 31, 2007	Devran Ayhan	(Turkey)	Ankaragücü	—	Free
May 31, 2007	Murat Ocak	(Turkey)	Ankaragücü	—	Free
May 31, 2007	Sedat Yeşilkaya	(Turkey)	Ankaragücü	—	Free
May 31, 2007	Tita	(Brazil)	Ankaragücü	Ankaraspor	Loan finish

=== June ===
Date	Name	Nat	Moving from	Moving to	Fee
June 1, 2007	Servet Çetin	(Turkey)	Sivasspor	Galatasaray S.K.	Free
June 6, 2007	Roberto Carlos	(Brazil)	Real Madrid	Fenerbahçe S.K.	Free
June 8, 2007	Saša Ilić	(Serbia)	Galatasaray S.K.	Red Bull Salzburg	€900,000
June 10, 2007	Ali Güneş	(Turkey)	Beşiktaş J.K.	SC Freiburg	Free
June 11, 2007	Wederson	(Brazil)	Ankaraspor	Fenerbahçe S.K.	€1.5M
June 12, 2007	Tobias Linderoth	(Sweden)	FC Copenhagen	Galatasaray S.K.	Undisclosed
June 12, 2007	Adnan Güngör	(Turkey)	Samsunspor	Trabzonspor	Undisclosed
June 12, 2007	Tuncay	(Turkey)	Fenerbahçe S.K.	Middlesbrough F.C.	Free
June 13, 2007	Serkan Balcı	(Turkey)	Fenerbahçe S.K.	Trabzonspor	Free
June 15, 2007	Colin Kazim-Richards	(Turkey)	Sheffield United	Fenerbahçe S.K.	€1.88M
June 15, 2007	Nick Carle	(Australia)	Newcastle Jets	Gençlerbirliği	$600,000
June 17, 2007	Rüştü Reçber	(Turkey)	Fenerbahçe S.K.	Beşiktaş J.K.	Free
June 17, 2007	Mehmet Yozgatlı	(Turkey)	Fenerbahçe S.K.	Beşiktaş J.K.	Free
June 17, 2007	Ismael Bouzid	(Algeria)	Kaiserslautern	Galatasaray S.K.	Undisclosed
June 20, 2007	Vedran Runje	(Croatia)	Beşiktaş J.K.	RC Lens	€1M
June 20, 2007	Orkun Uşak	(Turkey)	Kayseri Erciyesspor	Galatasaray S.K.	Undisclosed
June 21, 2007	Lincoln	(Brazil)	Schalke 04	Galatasaray S.K.	€4.5M
June 28, 2007	Édouard Cissé	(France)	Paris Saint-Germain	Beşiktaş J.K.	Undisclosed

=== July ===
Date	Name	Nat	Moving from	Moving to	Fee
July 2, 2007	Lamine Diatta	(Senegal)	AS Saint-Étienne	Beşiktaş J.K.	Undisclosed
July 2, 2007	Ali Bilgin	(Turkey)	Antalyaspor	Fenerbahçe S.K.	Undisclosed
July 6, 2007	İlhan Parlak	(Turkey)	Kayserispor	Fenerbahçe S.K.	Undisclosed
July 6, 2007	Gürhan Gürsoy	(Turkey)	Sivasspor	Fenerbahçe S.K.	Loan finish
July 6, 2007	Onur Tuncer	(Turkey)	Mardinspor	Fenerbahçe S.K.	Loan finish
July 6, 2007	Volkan Babacan	(Turkey)	İstanbulspor	Fenerbahçe S.K.	Loan finish
July 6, 2007	Mateus	(Brazil)	Bursaspor	Fenerbahçe S.K.	Loan finish
July 12, 2007	Gökhan Gönül	(Turkey)	Gençlerbirliği	Fenerbahçe S.K.	Undisclosed
July 27, 2007	Kerim Zengin	(Turkey)	Fenerbahçe S.K.	İstanbul Büyükşehir Belediyespor	Loan
July 27, 2007	Olcan Adın	(Turkey)	Fenerbahçe S.K.	Karşıyaka S.K.	Loan
July 28, 2007	Mahmut Hanefi Erdoğdu	(Turkey)	Fenerbahçe S.K.	Orduspor	Free
July 28, 2007	Recep Biler	(Turkey)	Fenerbahçe S.K.	Gençlerbirliği OFTAŞ	Free
July 31, 2007	Tita	(Brazil)	Ankaraspor	Ankaragücü	Free

=== August ===
Date	Name	Nat	Moving from	Moving to	Fee
August 3, 2007	Yasin Çakmak	(Turkey)	Çaykur Rizespor	Fenerbahçe S.K.	$1.25M
August 3, 2007	Ramzan Kurşunlu	(Turkey)	Beşiktaş J.K.	Ankaraspor	Undisclosed
August 4, 2007	Cihan Haspolatlı	(Turkey)	Galatasaray S.K.	Bursaspor	Free
August 9, 2007	Hasan Kabze	(Turkey)	Galatasaray S.K.	FC Rubin Kazan	€1.5M
August 10, 2007	Stjepan Tomas	(Croatia)	Galatasaray S.K.	FC Rubin Kazan	€2.8M
August 21, 2007	Mateus	(Brazil)	Fenerbahçe S.K.	Ankaraspor	Loan
August 21, 2007	Federico Higuaín	(Argentina)	River Plate	Beşiktaş J.K.	$1.65M
August 21, 2007	Kleberson	(Brazil)	Beşiktaş J.K.	Santos	Free
August 23, 2007	Fahri Tatan	(Turkey)	Beşiktaş J.K.	Çaykur Rizespor	Loan
August 23, 2007	Gökhan Güleç	(Turkey)	Beşiktaş J.K.	Denizlispor	Loan
August 29, 2007	Jaba	(Brazil)	Ankaraspor	Ankaragücü	Free
August 31, 2007	Shabani Nonda	(Democratic Republic of the Congo)	A.S. Roma	Galatasaray S.K.	Undisclosed
August 31, 2007	Ergün Penbe	(Turkey)	Galatasaray S.K.	Gaziantepspor	Free

=== September ===
Date	Name	Nat	Moving from	Moving to	Fee
September 2, 2007	Hakan Balta	(Turkey)	Vestel Manisaspor	Galatasaray S.K.	Free
September 2, 2007	Aydın Yılmaz	(Turkey)	Galatasaray S.K.	Vestel Manisaspor	Loan
September 2, 2007	Anıl Karaer	(Turkey)	Galatasaray S.K.	Vestel Manisaspor	Loan
September 3, 2007	Necati Ateş	(Turkey)	Galatasaray S.K.	Ankaraspor	Loan
September 3, 2007	Orhan Ak	(Turkey)	Galatasaray S.K.	Ankaraspor	Loan
September 3, 2007	Emre Aşık	(Turkey)	Galatasaray S.K.	Ankaraspor	Loan
September 3, 2007	Şevki Koç	(Turkey)	Istanbulspor	Ankaragücü	Undisclosed

== Winter transfer window ==
=== December ===
Date	Name	Nat	Moving from	Moving to	Fee
December 27, 2007	Emre Güngör	(Turkey)	Ankaragucu	Galatasaray	Undisclosed

=== January ===
Date	Name	Nat	Moving from	Moving to	Fee
January 1, 2008	Filip Hološko	(Slovakia)	Manisaspor	Beşiktaş J.K.	$23.5M
January 20, 2008	Necati Ates	(Turkey)	Ankaraspor	Galatasaray	Loan Finish
January 24, 2008	Claudio Maldonado	(Chile)	Santos FC	Fenerbahçe	$1.3M
January 30, 2008	Ahmed Barusso	(Ghana)	AS Roma	Galatasaray	Loan
January 30, 2008	Mehmet Akgün	(Turkey)	Kasimpaşa	Willem II	
