= List of Turkish football transfers 2006–07 =

This is a list of Turkish football transfers for the 2006–07 season. Only moves from the Süper Lig are listed.

The first transfer window of the season ran from the end of the 2005–06 season to August 31, 2006. The second transfer window ran from January 1, 2007, to January 31, 2007.

== Summer transfer window ==
=== June ===
Date	Name	Nat	Moving from	Moving to	Fee
June 27, 2006	Marcelo Carrusca	(Argentina)	Estudiantes	Galatasaray S.K.	€1.8

=== July ===
Date	Name	Nat	Moving from	Moving to	Fee
July 5, 2006	Rüştü Reçber	(Turkey)	FC Barcelona	Fenerbahçe S.K.	Free
July 14, 2006	Uğur Boral	(Turkey)	Gençlerbirliği	Fenerbahçe S.K.	Free
July 28, 2006	Mateus	(Brazil)	Iraty	Fenerbahçe S.K.	Undisclosed
July 28, 2006	Mateus	(Brazil)	Fenerbahçe S.K.	Bursaspor	Season-long loan
July 30, 2006	Musa Büyük	(Turkey)	Ankaraspor	Trabzonspor	P/Ex
July 30, 2006	Ersen Martin	(Turkey)	Ankaraspor	Trabzonspor	P/Ex
July 30, 2006	Marcelinho	(Brazil)	Hertha BSC Berlin	Trabzonspor	€2.5m
July 30, 2006	Ardian Đokaj	(Montenegro)	Trabzonspor	Ankaraspor	Season-long loan, P/Ex
July 30, 2006	Mehmet Yılmaz	(Turkey)	Trabzonspor	Ankaraspor	P/Ex
July 30, 2006	Adem Koçak	(Turkey)	Trabzonspor	Ankaraspor	P/Ex

=== August ===
Date	Name	Nat	Moving from	Moving to	Fee
August 18, 2006	Ricardinho	(Brazil)	Corinthians	Beşiktaş J.K.	Undisclosed
August 21, 2006	Diego Lugano	(Uruguay)	São Paulo	Fenerbahçe S.K.	€5.7m
August 24, 2006	Nicolas Anelka	(France)	Fenerbahçe S.K.	Bolton	€11.8m
August 27, 2006	Fábio Luciano	(Brazil)	Fenerbahçe S.K	Corinthians	Loan termination
August 28, 2006	Mateja Kežman	(Serbia)	Atlético de Madrid	Fenerbahçe S.K.	€8.5m
August 28, 2006	Deivid de Souza	(Brazil)	Sporting Clube de Portugal	Fenerbahçe S.K.	€6m
August 29, 2006	Edu Dracena	(Brazil)	Cruzeiro EC	Fenerbahçe S.K.	€5.7m
August 30, 2006	Servet Çetin	(Turkey)	Fenerbahçe S.K	Sivasspor	Free
August 30, 2006	Gürhan Gürsoy	(Turkey)	Fenerbahçe S.K	Sivasspor	Season-long loan
August 31, 2006	Mahmut Hanefi Erdoğdu	(Turkey)	Fenerbahçe S.K	Gaziantepspor	Season-long loan

== Winter transfer window ==
=== January ===
Date	Name	Nat	Moving from	Moving to	Fee
January 12, 2007	Marcelinho	(Brazil)	Trabzonspor	VfL Wolfsburg	€2.5m
January 31, 2007	Ayman Abdelaziz	(Egypt)	Gençlerbirliği	Trabzonspor	€1.2m
January 31, 2007	Fredrik Risp	(Sweden)	Gençlerbirliği	Trabzonspor	€1.2m
January 31, 2007	Ceyhun Eriş	(Turkey)	Ankaragücü	Trabzonspor	Free

== Unsorted ==
Date	Name	Nat	Moving from	Moving to	Fee
—	Posavec Srebrenko	(Croatia)	NK Varteks	Ankaragücü	Undisclosed
—	Ayhan Devran	(Turkey)	Kayseri Erciyesspor	Ankaraspor	Undisclosed
—	Anil Tasdemir	(Turkey)	Göztepe A.Ş.	Ankaraspor	Undisclosed
—	Hasan Yigit	(Turkey)	Ankaraspor	Bursaspor	Undisclosed
—	Óscar Córdoba	(Colombia)	Beşiktaş J.K.	Antalyaspor	Free
—	Jarosław Bieniuk	(Poland)	Amica	Antalyaspor	Undisclosed
—	Piotr Dziewicki	(Poland)	Amica	Antalyaspor	Undisclosed
—	Ilyas Kahraman	(Turkey)	Diyarbakirspor	Antalyaspor	Undisclosed
—	Vedran Runje	(Croatia)	Standard	Beşiktaş J.K.	—
—	Matías Emilio Delgado	(Argentina)	Basel	Beşiktaş J.K.	€4.8m
—	Burak Yılmaz	(Turkey)	Antalyaspor	Beşiktaş J.K.	Undisclosed
—	Baki Mercimek	(Turkey)	Gençlerbirliği S.K.	Beşiktaş J.K.	Undisclosed
—	Fahri Tatan	(Turkey)	Çaykur Rizespor	Beşiktaş J.K.	Undisclosed
—	Serdar Kurtuluş	(Turkey)	Bursaspor	Beşiktaş J.K.	Undisclosed
—	Bobo	(Brazil)	Corinthians	Beşiktaş J.K.	Undisclosed
—	Çağdaş Atan	(Turkey)	Beşiktaş J.K.	Trabzonspor	Undisclosed
—	Ahmed Hassan	(Egypt)	Beşiktaş J.K.	RSC Anderlecht	€4.6m
—	Souleymane Youla	(Guinea)	Beşiktaş J.K.	OSC Lille	Undisclosed
—	Sergen Yalçın	(Turkey)	Beşiktaş J.K.	Etimesgut Şekerspor	Undisclosed
—	Ahmet Dursun	(Turkey)	Beşiktaş J.K.	—	Free transfer
—	Tayfur Havutçu	(Turkey)	Beşiktaş J.K.	—	Retired
—	Volkan Unlu	(Turkey)	Beşiktaş J.K.	—	Free transfer
—	Sinan Kaloğlu	(Turkey)	Beşiktaş J.K.	Bursaspor	Undisclosed
—	Daniel Pancu	(Romania)	Beşiktaş J.K.	Bursaspor	Undisclosed
—	Juanfran	(Spain)	Beşiktaş J.K.	AFC Ajax	Free transfer
—	Okan Buruk	(Turkey)	Beşiktaş J.K.	Galatasaray	Undisclosed
—	Volkan Babacan	(Turkey)	Fenerbahçe S.K	Istanbulspor	Season-long loan
—	Zafer Biryol	(Turkey)	Fenerbahçe S.K.	Bursaspor	Undisclosed
—	Murat Hacıoğlu	(Turkey)	Fenerbahçe S.K.	Ankaraspor	Undisclosed
—	Tita	(Brazil)	Ankaraspor	Ankaragücü	Season-long loan
—	Zafer Biryol	(Turkey)	Bursaspor	Çaykur Rizespor	Undisclosed
—	Okan Buruk	(Turkey)	Beşiktaş J.K.	Galatasaray S.K.	Free
—	Tolga Seyhan	(Turkey)	Shakhtar Donetsk	Galatasaray S.K.	Season-long loan
—	Mehmet Topal	(Turkey)	Dardanelspor	Galatasaray S.K.	—
—	Junichi Inamoto	(Japan)	West Brom	Galatasaray S.K.	—
—	Umut Bulut	(Turkey)	Ankaragücü	Trabzonspor	—
—	Kiki Musampa	(Netherlands)	Atlético Madrid	Trabzonspor	Free
—	Murat Ocak	(Turkey)	Ankaragücü	Trabzonspor	—
