= Coşkun =

Coşkun (Turkish pronunciation: [dʒoʃˈkun]) is a Turkish name that means "enthusiastic". It may refer to:

== Given name ==
- Coşkun Aral (born 1956), Turkish photo journalist, war correspondent
- Coşkun Birdal (born 1973), Turkish footballer
- Coşkun Büktel (1950–2018), Turkish playwright
- Coşkun Can Aktan (born 1963), Turkish economist and professor
- Coşkun Çörüz (born 1963), Dutch politician of Turkish descent
- Coşkun Göğen (born 1946), Turkish film and theatre actor
- Coşkun Kırca (1927–2005), Turkish diplomat, journalist and politician
- Coşkun Özarı (1931–2011), Turkish footballer
- Coşkun Sabah (born 1952), Turkish musician
- Coşkun Taş (1935–2024), Turkish footballer

== Surname ==
- Ahmet Hakan Coşkun (born 1967), Turkish columnist
- Ali Coşkun (born 1939), Turkey's minister of Industry and Trade
- Bekir Coşkun (1945–2020), Turkish journalist
- Çağrı Coşkun (born 1984), Turkish motorcycle racer
- Gülnaz Büşranur Coşkun (born 1999), Turkish archer
- Gürkan Coşkun (1941–2022), Turkish painter
- İbrahim Ferdi Coşkun (born 1987), Turkish footballer
- Olgay Coşkun (born 1984), Turkish footballer
- Serhat Coşkun (born 1987), Turkish volleyball player
- Servet Coşkun (born 1990), Turkish sport wrestler
- Sezgin Coşkun (born 1984), Turkish footballer
- Su Burcu Yazgı Coşkun (born 2005), Turkish actress

== Places ==
- Coşkun, Ergani
