= Tuncer =

Tuncer is a Turkish surname and a masculine given name. Notable people with the name include:

== Surname ==
- Buğrahan Tuncer (born 1993), Turkish professional basketball player
- Cem Tuncer (born 1978), bass guitarist, composer, arranger, and producer
- Cengiz Tuncer (1942–1992), Turkish politician
- Erol Tuncer (born 1938), Turkish engineer, bureaucrat and politician
- Firat Tuncer (born 1995), Turkish football player
- Onur Tuncer (born 1984), Turkish football player
- M. Nurullah Tuncer (born 1959), Turkish theatre director
- Mustafa Tuncer (born 1971), Turkish politician
- Onur Tuncer (born 1984), Turkish football player
- Yenal Tuncer (born 1985), Turkish football player

== Given name ==
- Tuncer Bakırhan (born 1970), Turkish Kurdish politician
- Tuncer Cebeci (1934–2021), Turkish-American engineer and academic
- Tuncer Kayalar (born 1952), Turkish diplomat
- Tuncer Ören (born c. 1935), Turkish Canadian systems engineer and academic
