= Burak Yılmaz =

Turkish footballer (born 1985)

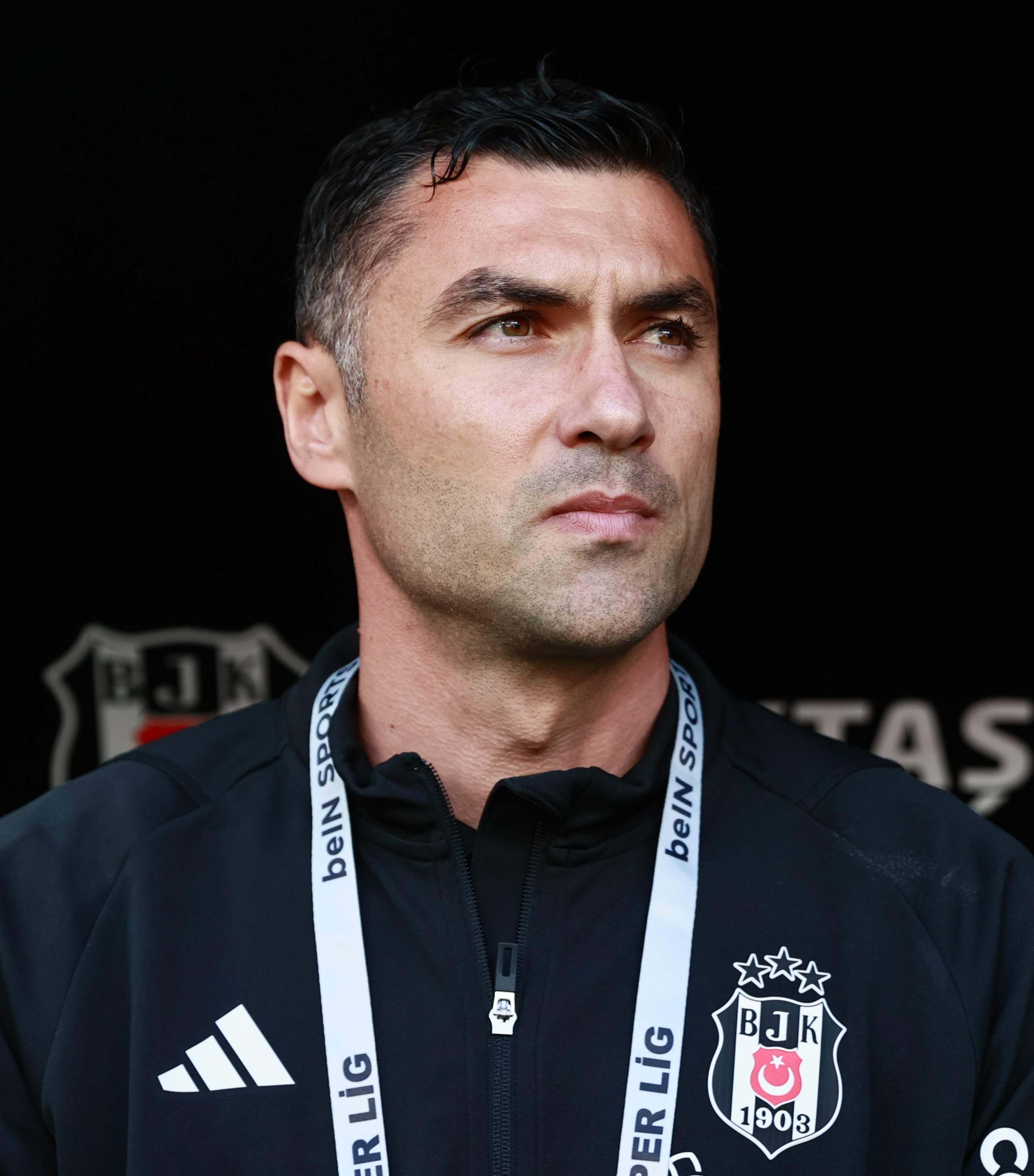
- Yılmaz with Beşiktaş in 2023

Personal information
- Date of birth: 15 July 1985 (age 41)
- Place of birth: Antalya, Turkey
- Height: 1.88 m (6 ft 2 in)
- Position: Forward

Team information
- Current team: Çorum (head coach)

Youth career
- 1994–2002: Antalyaspor

Senior career*
Years	Team	Apps	(Gls)
2002–2006	Antalyaspor	70	(17)
2006–2008	Beşiktaş	39	(6)
2008	Manisaspor	16	(9)
2008–2010	Fenerbahçe	6	(0)
2009–2010	→ Eskişehirspor (loan)	14	(1)
2010–2012	Trabzonspor	71	(54)
2012–2016	Galatasaray	105	(65)
2016–2017	Beijing Guoan	28	(19)
2017–2018	Trabzonspor	32	(28)
2018–2020	Beşiktaş	40	(24)
2020–2022	Lille	59	(20)
2022–2023	Fortuna Sittard	26	(9)
Total		506	(252)

International career
2001	Turkey U17	8	(1)
2002–2003	Turkey U18	10	(0)
2002–2004	Turkey U19	17	(0)
2004–2005	Turkey U20	11	(2)
2006	Turkey U21	7	(0)
2006	Turkey B	1	(1)
2006–2022	Turkey	77	(31)

Managerial career
- 2023: Beşiktaş (interim)
- 2024: Kayserispor
- 2025: Kasımpaşa
- 2025–2026: Gaziantep
- 2026–: Çorum
- * Club domestic league appearances and goals

Burak Yılmaz (born 15 July 1985) is a Turkish professional football coach and former player who played as a forward. He's currently serving as head coach at Süper Lig club Çorum.

Yılmaz is one of nine players to play for each of the Big Three clubs of Istanbul, and one of only two players who have played for these three clubs as well as Trabzonspor along with Sergen Yalçın.

Born in Antalya, Turkey, son of former Antalyaspor goalkeeper Fikret Yılmaz, Burak Yılmaz started to play football at Antalyaspor, where he signed his first professional contract in July 2002 and made his professional debut in the 2002–03 season of the TFF First League. Following four seasons at Antalyaspor, Yılmaz joined Beşiktaş prior to the 2006–07 season, where he played one and a half seasons and was primarily deployed as a winger. Yılmaz had a short spell in Manisaspor before he joined Fenerbahçe for the 2008–09 Süper Lig season. Loaned out to Eskişehirspor for the following season, Yılmaz was transferred to Trabzonspor in the winter transfer window of 2009–10 season, where he made his major career breakthrough under the management of Şenol Güneş, becoming Süper Lig top scorer with 33 goals in the 2011–12 season.

Following three seasons spent in Trabzonspor, where he won a Turkish Cup and Turkish Super Cup, Yılmaz joined Galatasaray, staying for four seasons and winning two Süper Lig titles in 2012–13 and 2014–15, as well as being Süper Lig top scorer for the second time in his career in the 2012–13 season. In 2016, Yılmaz joined Chinese Super League club Beijing Guoan for two seasons, where he scored 28 goals in total. Yılmaz then returned to Trabzonspor for a second spell which lasted two seasons. For the 2018–19 season, Yılmaz returned to Beşiktaş for another spell, scoring eleven and thirteen goals respectively in his two seasons back, before joining French Ligue 1 club Lille in 2020, helping the side win its first league title for ten years.

Representing Turkey in different youth age groups between 2001 and 2006, Yılmaz made his senior debut in a friendly game against Azerbaijan in 2006. With 31 goals, Yılmaz is Turkey's second all-time highest goalscorer after Hakan Şükür. He played his last game for the national team in 2022.

== Club career ==
=== Antalyaspor ===
Yılmaz started his professional career in Antalyaspor, where he was promoted to the senior team at the age of 16. He scored his first two goals at professional level in the 2004–05 season against Karşıyaka at Izmir Alsancak Stadium on 29 August 2004. In the same season, Yılmaz played 29 league matches, scoring 8 goals, thus helping his team avoid relegation. He contributed to the success of the team's promotion to the Süper Lig after finishing second in Division 1 in the 2005–06 season, scoring 9 goals in 24 matches. During his stint at Antalyaspor, Yılmaz played 70 league games and scored 17 league goals in total.

=== Beşiktaş ===
Yılmaz joined Beşiktaş in the 2006–07 summer transfer window. He made his Süper Lig debut on 6 August 2006 against Manisaspor, and scored his first goal against Konyaspor in a 3–1 win for Beşiktaş. He also scored against Trabzonspor. In his first season, he scored 5 goals in 30 league appearances as Beşiktaş finished the season in second place. In the same season, he made seven appearances in the Turkish Cup, scoring once. His form dropped dramatically during the 2007–08 season. In January 2008, Yılmaz joined Manisaspor as part of an exchange deal, and later to Fenerbahçe on 29 June 2008.

=== Fenerbahçe ===
On 29 June 2008, Yılmaz was transferred to Fenerbahçe and was presented at a news conference wearing the number 7 shirt. On the contrary to his "promising youngster" image in Manisaspor and Beşiktaş, he had been a disappointment during his spell in Fenerbahçe, only playing six games and failing to score in the 2008–09 season.

=== Trabzonspor ===
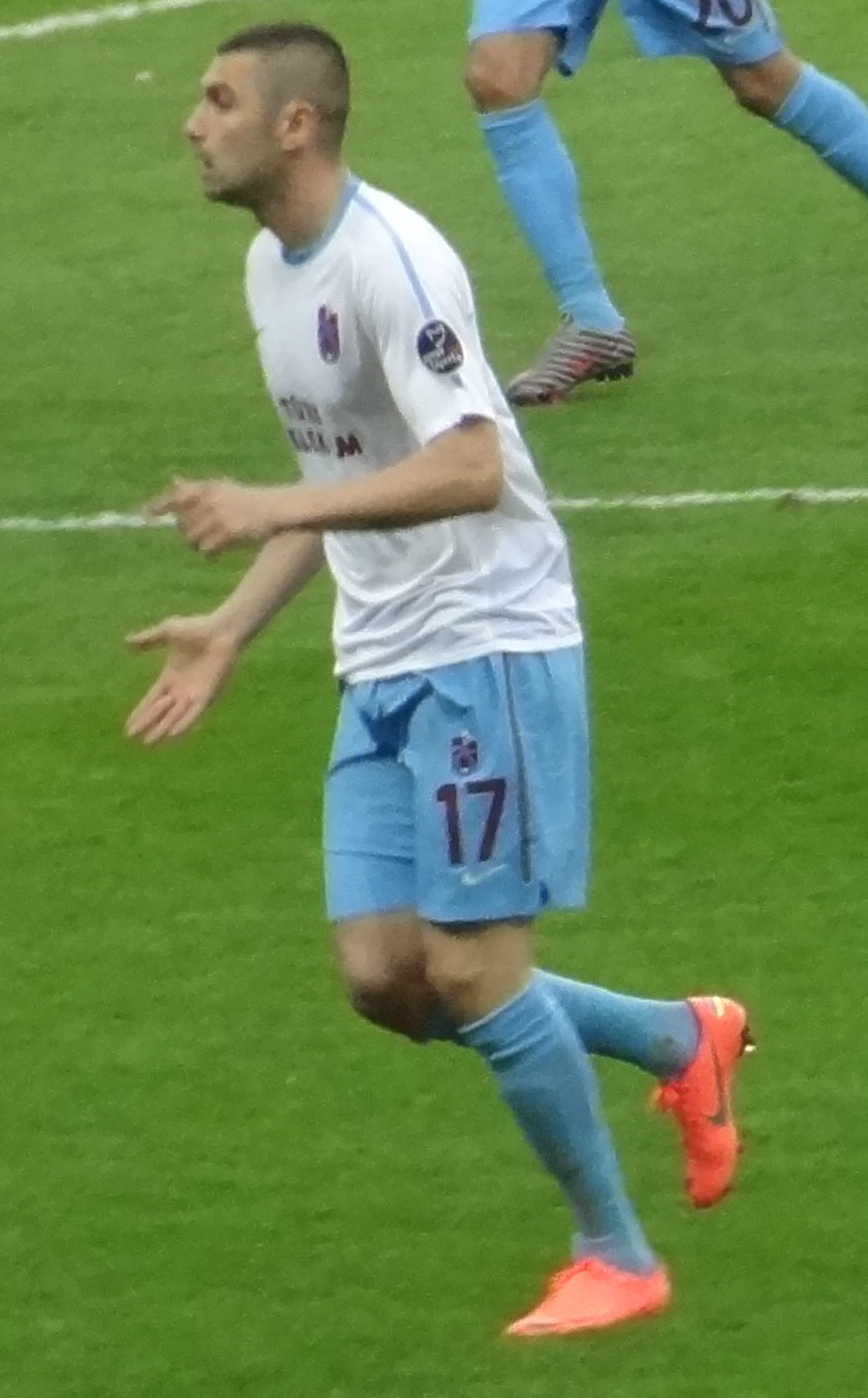
Yılmaz in 2012

In February 2010, Yılmaz joined Trabzonspor on a permanent deal. Following the arrival of Şenol Güneş as team manager, Yılmaz made his Trabzonspor debut on 15 February 2010, playing last 15 minutes against Bursaspor on a 1–1 draw. On 26 February 2013, he scored against his previous team Antalyaspor. Yılmaz played at Turkish Cup final where Trabzonspor defeated Fenerbahçe by 3–1, on 5 May 2010. Ten days later, Trabzonspor played against Fenerbahçe again in lask week of Süper Lig fixtures in which Yılmaz scored in 23rd minute, as parties shared points after a 1–1 draw, causing Fenerbahçe to jeopardise their title chances in contention with Bursaspor. Yılmaz became leading goalscorer of Trabzonspor with 19 goals in 30 league games and July 2011 he signed a new four-year contract with the club.

In 2010–11 season, Yılmaz displayed a high-level attacking attributes, scoring the winners against Beşiktaş and Galatasaray and Bursaspor, where Trabzonspor finalised the fixtures on second spot. In 2011–12 season, where a play-off stage applied after 34-weeks-regular-fixtures, Yılmaz scored 33 goals in 34 appearances at regular season, setting a new club record previously held by Fatih Tekke who scored 31 goals in the 2004–05 season.

=== Galatasaray ===
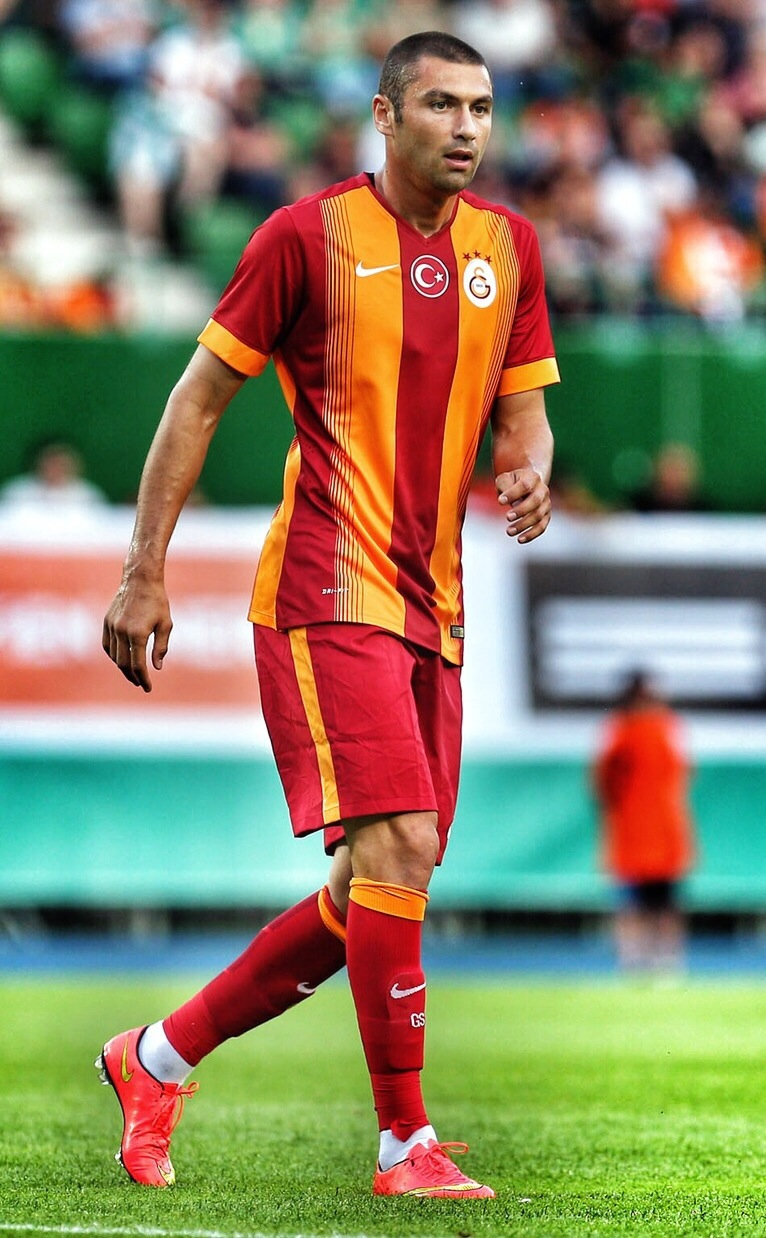
Yılmaz in 2014

In July 2012, Yılmaz joined Galatasaray from Trabzonspor for €5m transfer fee, with a four-year-contract with an additional one-season-option. His contract consisted of €2.3 million seasonal wage with a €20,000 bonus per-appearance.

On 2 September 2012, he scored his first goal for Galatasaray against Bursaspor, as the game finished 3–2, making it Galatasaray's historic 1000th league win.

Yılmaz scored the only goal for Galatasaray as the game ended in a 1–1 home draw against Eskişehirspor. On 23 October 2012, he scored a goal from a header against CFR Cluj as the game ended in a 1–1 draw at third match-week in Group H of the 2012–13 UEFA Champions League group stage. On 28 October 2012, Yılmaz scored his 100th career goal, during a 3–0 win against Kayserispor, maintaining their position as league leaders.

On 7 November 2012, Burak netted a hat-trick in a 3–1 away win over CFR Cluj in the Champions League, becoming the first Turkish player to score three goals in a Champions League game since Tuncay Şanlı. At Champions League group stage, he scored once again, this time against Manchester United in which Galatasaray won 1–0. Yılmaz finished group stage of the as top scorer with 6 goals in total 501 minutes played, ahead of Cristiano Ronaldo, who scored the same number of goals in 540 minutes. In the Champions League round of 16, he scored in both legs against Schalke 04, before his team was eliminated by Real Madrid in the quarter-finals.

On 23 November 2013, Burak scored his 100th Süper Lig goal against Sivasspor in a 2–1 home win.

=== Beijing Guoan ===
On 5 February 2016, Galatasaray announced the transfer of Yılmaz to Chinese Super League club Beijing Guoan for €8 million transfer fee. Trabzonspor was to receive €2 million from Galatasaray, following the transaction agreement.

=== Return to Trabzonspor ===
On 2 August 2017, Yılmaz returned to Trabzonspor, for family reasons. He managed to score 23 goals in 25 matches during the 2017–18 season.

=== Return to Beşiktaş ===
Yılmaz scored 25 goals in 40 official games during his second period at Beşiktaş.

=== Lille ===
Lille announced the arrival of Yılmaz on 1 August 2020. The parties agreed upon a two-season-long contract. Substituted with Jonathan David in 64th minute, Yılmaz made his Ligue 1 debut against Rennes at first week encounter of 2020–21 season, ended 1–1, held at Stade Pierre-Mauroy, on 22 August 2020. On week 6, Yılmaz scored his first league goal against Strasbourg as Lille beat their opponents with 3–0 being the final score, on 4 October 2020. On 25 April 2021, he scored a brace in a 3–2 comeback away win over fellow title challengers Lyon. On 23 May 2021, he scored a penalty in a 2–1 away win over Angers, to secure the fourth Ligue 1 title for Lille in their history. He became the first player to score at least 15 goals in his first Ligue 1 season with Lille since Moussa Sow hit 25 in their title-winning campaign a decade prior.

=== Fortuna Sittard ===
On 21 June 2022, Yılmaz signed a five-year contract with Eredivisie club Fortuna Sittard in the Netherlands, the first two years of the contract are in a player role, and the last three are as a coach. On 6 August, the opening day of the 2022–23 season, he made his debut for Sittard in a 3–2 home defeat against Ajax, replacing Tijjani Noslin in the 66th minute and scoring his first goal for the club from a direct free-kick shortly before the final whistle. He made his first start for the club on 20 August, opening the score in a 4–1 home loss to Cambuur.

=== Retirement ===
On 5 June 2023, Yılmaz held a press conference and announced his retirement from football at the age of 37.

== International career ==
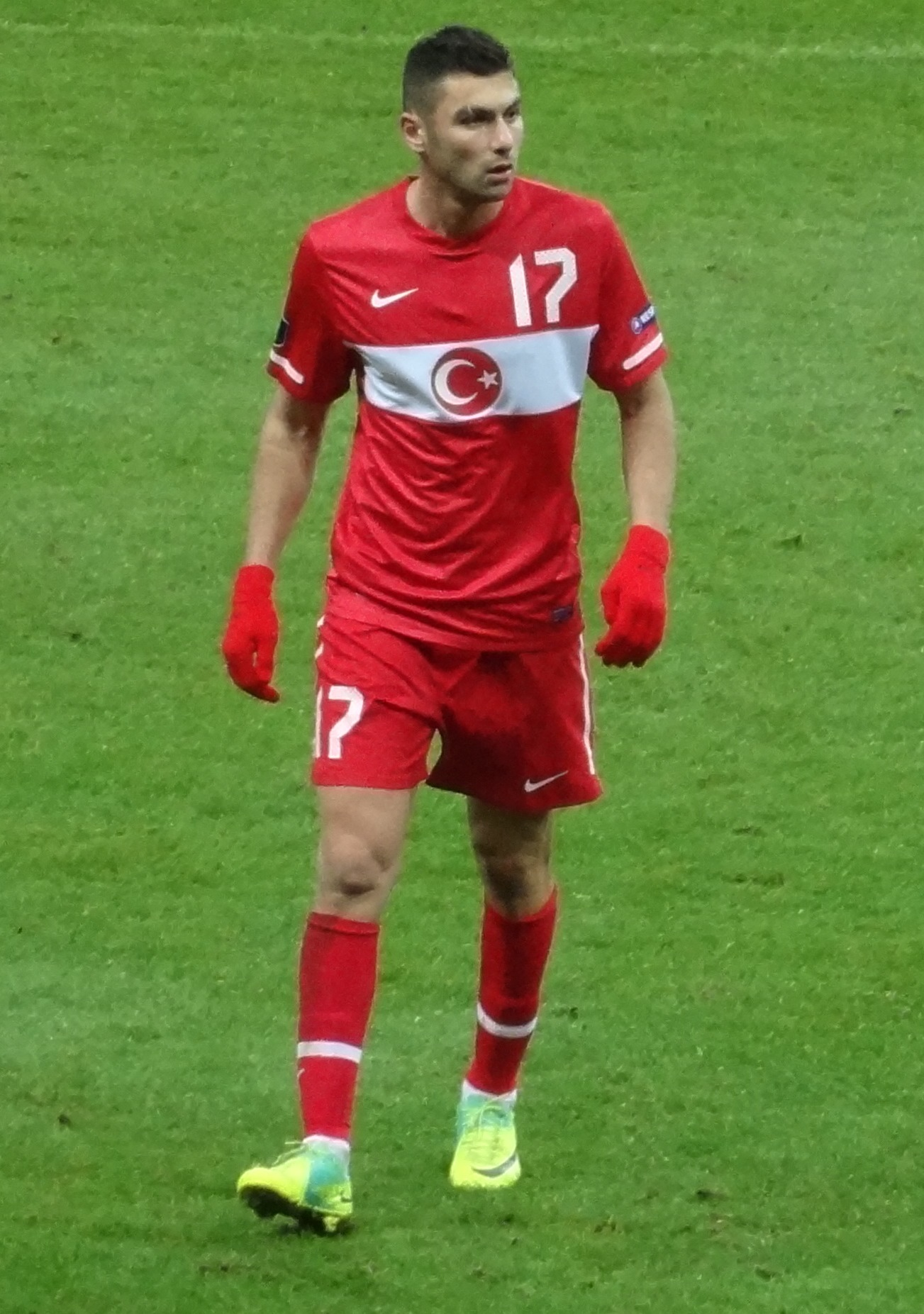
Yılmaz with Turkey in 2011

On 12 April 2006, Yılmaz made his international debut for Turkey under coach Fatih Terim in a 1–1 away draw with Azerbaijan in a friendly match. On 3 June 2011, he scored his first goal in a 1–1 away draw with Belgium during the UEFA Euro 2012 qualifying. Later on, he was part of Turkey squad in the UEFA Euro 2016 and UEFA Euro 2020.

On 24 March 2021, he scored his first international hat-trick in a 4–2 win over the Netherlands in the 2022 FIFA World Cup qualification. On 24 March 2022, he played his last match for Turkey against Portugal in the second round of same qualifications, in which he scored a goal but missed a crucial penalty to equalise, in a match which ended in a 3–1 defeat. He announced his retirement from international football following the match.

== Managerial career ==
=== Beşiktaş ===
On 1 July 2023, Yılmaz was appointed as assistant coach of Beşiktaş following his retirement from professional football.

His first match as manager was a 2–0 home win over İstanbulspor on 8 October 2023.

On 10 October 2023, following the resignation of Şenol Güneş, Yılmaz was appointed as the club's interim manager. A month later, following Beşiktaş' elimination from European competitions, after a 1–2 home defeat to Bodø/Glimt in the group stage of the UEFA Europa Conference League, the club announced that Yılmaz had stepped down as interim manager.

=== Kayserispor ===
On 28 January 2024, Kayserispor announced the appointment of Yılmaz as the new manager.

== Managerial statistics ==
As of 20 April 2026

Team	Nat	From	To	Record				
Team	Nat	From	To	G	W	D	L	Win %
Beşiktaş	(Turkey)	6 October 2023	10 November 2023	6	2	0	4	33.33
Kayserispor	(Turkey)	29 January 2024	1 October 2024	21	3	10	8	14.29
Kasımpaşa	(Turkey)	30 January 2025	30 June 2025	16	6	4	6	37.50
Gaziantep	(Turkey)	19 August 2025	Present	33	13	10	10	39.39
Total				76	24	24	28	31.58

== Personal life ==
Yılmaz is the son of former professional footballer and manager Fikret Yılmaz. Yılmaz has two daughters from his marriage to İstem Atilla, which lasted for four years between 2014 and 2018. In 2020, the couple decided to get together again and remarried.

In an interview, he confirmed that he has been a Beşiktaş fan since childhood. He also stated that his idol is Sergen Yalçın and as a kid he grew up watching him to play football since childhood.

In 2020, Yılmaz became an official member of congress in Beşiktaş. President Ahmet Nur Çebi gave the membership card to the player.

== Career statistics ==
=== Club ===
Appearances and goals by club, season and competition
Club	Season	League			National cup (Note: Includes Turkish Cup, Chinese FA Cup, Coupe de France, KNVB Cup)		Continental		Other		Total	
Club	Season	Division	Apps	Goals	Apps	Goals	Apps	Goals	Apps	Goals	Apps	Goals
Antalyaspor	2002–03	TFF First League	4	0	0	0	—		—		4	0
Antalyaspor	2003–04	TFF First League	13	0	1	0	—		—		14	0
Antalyaspor	2004–05	TFF First League	29	8	2	1	—		—		31	9
Antalyaspor	2005–06	TFF First League	24	9	0	0	—		—		24	9
Antalyaspor	Total		70	17	3	1	—		—		73	18
Beşiktaş	2006–07	Süper Lig	30	5	7	1	6 (Note: Appearances in UEFA Cup)	0	—		43	6
Beşiktaş	2007–08	Süper Lig	9	1	1	0	2 (Note: Appearances in UEFA Champions League)	0	—		12	1
Beşiktaş	Total		39	6	8	1	8	0	—		55	7
Manisaspor	2007–08	Süper Lig	16	9	2	0	—		—		18	9
Fenerbahçe	2008–09	Süper Lig	6	0	3	0	7	0	—		16	0
Eskişehirspor (loan)	2009–10	Süper Lig	14	1	3	1	—		—		17	2
Trabzonspor	2009–10	Süper Lig	11	3	3	0	—		—		14	3
Trabzonspor	2010–11	Süper Lig	30	19	3	1	2 (Note: Appearances in UEFA Europa League)	0	1 (Note: Appearance in Turkish Super Cup)	0	36	20
Trabzonspor	2011–12	Süper Lig	30	32	1	1	8 (Note: Five appearances in UEFA Champions League, three appearances and one goal in UEFA Europa League)	1	4 (Note: Appearances in Süper Lig European play-offs)	1	43	35
Trabzonspor	Total		71	54	7	2	10	1	5	1	93	58
Galatasaray	2012–13	Süper Lig	30	24	0	0	9	8	0	0	39	32
Galatasaray	2013–14	Süper Lig	32	16	6	2	6	0	0	0	44	18
Galatasaray	2014–15	Süper Lig	28	16	2	4	6	2	1	0	37	22
Galatasaray	2015–16	Süper Lig	15	9	0	0	4	0	1	1	21	10
Galatasaray	Total		105	65	8	6	25	10	3	1	141	82
Beijing Guoan	2016	Chinese Super League	17	11	3	0	—		—		20	11
Beijing Guoan	2017	Chinese Super League	11	8	0	0	—		—		11	8
Beijing Guoan	Total		28	19	3	0	—		—		31	19
Trabzonspor	2017–18	Süper Lig	25	23	0	0	—		—		25	23
Trabzonspor	2018–19	Süper Lig	7	5	0	0	—		—		7	5
Trabzonspor	Total		32	28	0	0	—		—		32	28
Beşiktaş	2018–19	Süper Lig	15	11	—		0	0	—		15	11
Beşiktaş	2019–20	Süper Lig	25	13	1	1	0	0	—		26	14
Beşiktaş	Total		40	24	1	1	0	0	—		41	25
Lille	2020–21	Ligue 1	28	16	1	0	4	2	—		33	18
Lille	2021–22	Ligue 1	31	4	1	0	7	3	1 (Note: Appearance in Trophée des Champions)	0	40	7
Lille	Total		59	20	2	0	11	5	1	0	73	25
Fortuna Sittard	2022–23	Eredivisie	26	9	1	0	—		—		27	9
Career total			506	252	41	12	61	16	9	2	617	282

=== International ===
Appearances and goals by national team and year
National team	Year	Apps	Goals
Turkey	2006	4	0
Turkey	2007	0	0
Turkey	2008	0	0
Turkey	2009	0	0
Turkey	2010	1	0
Turkey	2011	9	3
Turkey	2012	8	3
Turkey	2013	11	7
Turkey	2014	4	2
Turkey	2015	5	4
Turkey	2016	6	3
Turkey	2017	4	1
Turkey	2018	0	0
Turkey	2019	7	1
Turkey	2020	4	0
Turkey	2021	13	6
Turkey	2022	1	1
Total		77	31

Scores and results list Turkey's goal tally first, score column indicates score after each Yılmaz goal.

List of international goals scored by Burak Yılmaz
No.	Date	Venue	Opponent	Score	Result	Competition
1	3 June 2011	King Baudouin Stadium, Brussels, Belgium	Belgium	1–1	1–1	UEFA Euro 2012 qualification
2	2 September 2011	Türk Telekom Arena, Istanbul, Turkey	Kazakhstan	1–0	2–1	UEFA Euro 2012 qualification
3	11 October 2011	Türk Telekom Arena, Istanbul, Turkey	Azerbaijan	1–0	1–0	UEFA Euro 2012 qualification
4	26 May 2012	Red Bull Arena, Salzburg, Austria	Finland	1–1	2–3	Friendly
5	26 May 2012	Red Bull Arena, Salzburg, Austria	Finland	2–1	2–3	Friendly
6	29 May 2012	Red Bull Arena, Salzburg, Austria	Bulgaria	2–0	2–0	Friendly
7	22 March 2013	Estadi Comunal d'Andorra la Vella, Andorra la Vella, Andorra	Andorra	2–0	2–0	2014 FIFA World Cup qualification
8	26 March 2013	Şükrü Saracoğlu Stadium, Istanbul, Turkey	Hungary	1–0	1–1	2014 FIFA World Cup qualification
9	14 August 2013	Atatürk Olympic Stadium, Istanbul, Turkey	Ghana	1–0	2–2	Friendly
10	6 September 2013	Kadir Has Stadium, Kayseri, Turkey	Andorra	3–0	5–0	2014 FIFA World Cup qualification
11	10 September 2013	Arena Națională, Bucharest, Romania	Romania	1–0	2–0	2014 FIFA World Cup qualification
12	11 October 2013	A. Le Coq Arena, Tallinn, Estonia	Estonia	2–0	2–0	2014 FIFA World Cup qualification
13	19 November 2013	Tevfik Sırrı Gür Stadium, Mersin, Turkey	Belarus	2–1	2–1	Friendly
14	16 November 2014	Türk Telekom Arena, Istanbul, Turkey	Kazakhstan	1–0	3–1	UEFA Euro 2016 qualification
15	16 November 2014	Türk Telekom Arena, Istanbul, Turkey	Kazakhstan	2–0	3–1	UEFA Euro 2016 qualification
16	28 March 2015	Amsterdam Arena, Amsterdam, Netherlands	Netherlands	1–0	1–1	UEFA Euro 2016 qualification
17	8 June 2015	Recep Tayyip Erdoğan Stadium, Istanbul, Turkey	Bulgaria	3–0	4–0	Friendly
18	8 June 2015	Recep Tayyip Erdoğan Stadium, Istanbul, Turkey	Bulgaria	4–0	4–0	Friendly
19	6 September 2015	Torku Arena, Konya, Turkey	Netherlands	3–0	3–0	UEFA Euro 2016 qualification
20	5 June 2016	Stozice Stadium, Ljubljana, Slovenia	Slovenia	1–0	1–0	Friendly
21	21 June 2016	Stade Bollaert-Delelis, Lens, France	Czech Republic	1–0	2–0	UEFA Euro 2016
22	11 November 2016	Antalya Stadium, Antalya, Turkey	Kosovo	1–0	2–0	2018 FIFA World Cup qualification
23	11 June 2017	Loro Boriçi Stadium, Shkodër, Albania	Kosovo	3–1	4–1	2018 FIFA World Cup qualification
24	22 March 2019	Loro Boriçi Stadium, Shkodër, Albania	Albania	1–0	2–0	UEFA Euro 2020 qualification
25	24 March 2021	Atatürk Olympic Stadium, Istanbul, Turkey	Netherlands	1–0	4–2	2022 FIFA World Cup qualification
26	24 March 2021	Atatürk Olympic Stadium, Istanbul, Turkey	Netherlands	2–0	4–2	2022 FIFA World Cup qualification
27	24 March 2021	Atatürk Olympic Stadium, Istanbul, Turkey	Netherlands	4–2	4–2	2022 FIFA World Cup qualification
28	30 March 2021	Atatürk Olympic Stadium, Istanbul, Turkey	Latvia	3–1	3–3	2022 FIFA World Cup qualification
29	3 June 2021	Benteler-Arena, Paderborn, Germany	Moldova	1–0	2–0	Friendly
30	11 October 2021	Daugava Stadium, Riga, Latvia	Latvia	2–1	2–1	2022 FIFA World Cup qualification
31	24 March 2022	Estádio do Dragão, Porto, Portugal	Portugal	1–2	1–3	2022 FIFA World Cup qualification

== Honours ==
Beşiktaş

- Turkish Cup: 2006–07

Trabzonspor

- Turkish Cup: 2009–10
- Turkish Super Cup: 2010

Galatasaray

- Süper Lig: 2012–13, 2014–15
- Turkish Cup: 2013–14, 2014–15
- Turkish Super Cup: 2013, 2015

Lille

- Ligue 1: 2020–21
- Trophée des Champions: 2021

Individual

- Süper Lig Player of the Season: 2012–13
- Süper Lig Top scorer: 2011–12, 2012–13
- Süper Lig Forward of the Season: 2010–11, 2011–12, 2012–13, 2018–19
- Süper Lig Team of the Season: 2014–15, 2017–18, 2018–19
- UNFP Player of the Month: April 2021
- Ligue 1 Goal of the Year: 2020–21
- Lille Player of the Season: 2020–21
