= 2006–07 in Turkish football =

The 2006–07 season was the 103rd season of competitive football in Turkey.

== Events ==
- 4 August 2006 – First match of the season is played between Galatasaray S.K. and Büyükşehir Belediye Ankaraspor. The match resulted in a 1–1 draw.
- 5 August 2006 — Fenerbahçe S.K. begin their centenary year off with a 6–0 win over Kayseri Erciyesspor.
- 14 April 2007 – Lüleburgazspor and Belediye are promoted to the Turkish Third League. Oyak Renault and Cizrespor are relegated to the Turkish Third League. Karamanspor, Iğdırspor, and Sidespor are relegated to the Turkish Regional Amateur League.
- 19 April 2007 — Yalovaspor and Darica Gençlerbirliği are relegated to the Turkish Third League. DÇ Divriğispor requested to take the season off after their bus was involved in an accident for the second time this season. The bus turned over, injuring twenty players and staff. The Turkish Football Federation accepted the request. There will only be one club relegated from Group 2 (Iğdırspor) and DÇ Divriğispor will return next season playing in the Turkish Third League.
- 21 April 2007 – Diyarbakır BB DİSKİ, Bozüyükspor, Afyonkarahisarspor, and Gaziosmanpaşa are promoted to the Iddaa League B.
- 28 April 2007 — Göztepe are relegated to the İzmir Amateur League. Çorluspor are relegated to the Tekirdağ Amateur League. Bakırköy are relegated to the Istanbul Amateur League.
- 29 April 2007 — Sakaryaspor are relegated to the Türk Telekom League A.
- 1 May 2007 — Adanaspor, BUGSAŞ, and Tepecik Belediye are promoted to the Iddaa League B. Mersin B.B., Aksarayspor, Bulancakspor, Değirmenderespor, Aliağa Belediye, Merinos, Alibeyköy, and Gölcükspor qualify for the promotion play-offs. Osmaniyespor are relegated to the Osmaniye Amateur League.
- 13 May 2007 — Fenerbahçe S.K. become champion after a 2–2 draw with Trabzonspor, while second place Beşiktaş J.K. lost 0–3 to Bursaspor.

== Managerial changes ==
Name	Club	Date of departure	Replacement	Date of appointment
Giray Bulak	Ankaraspor		Aykut Kocaman	23 May 2006
Samet Aybaba	Gaziantepspor	June, 2006	Walter Zenga	14 June 2006
Christoph Daum	Fenerbahçe S.K.	16 June 2006	Zico	4 July 2007
Sebastião Lazaroni	Trabzonspor	28 August 2006	Ziya Doğan	8 September 2006
Raşit Çetiner	Bursaspor	31 October 2006	Engin İpekoğlu	November, 2006
Walter Zenga	Gaziantepspor	January, 2007	Erdoğan Arıca	3 January 2007
Mustafa Uğur	Kayseri Erciyesspor	January, 2007	Bülent Korkmaz	16 January 2007
Ersun Yanal	Vestel Manisaspor	19 March 2007	Giray Bulak	21 March 2007

== National team ==
Turkey began their qualifying campaign for Euro 2008 on 6 September, beating Malta 2–0.

Date	Venue	Opponents	Score	Competition	Turkey scorers	Match report
6 September 2006	Commerzbank-Arena, Frankfurt, Germany (H)	Malta	2-0	ECQ	Nihat Kahveci; Tümer Metin	UEFA
7 October 2006	Stadium Puskás Ferenc, Budapest, Hungary (A)	Hungary	1-0	ECQ	Tuncay Şanlı	UEFA
11 October 2006	Commerzbank-Arena, Frankfurt, Germany (H)	Moldova	5-0	ECQ	Hakan Şükür (4); Tuncay Şanlı	UEFA
24 March 2007	Georgios Karaiskakis Stadium, Piraeus, Greece (A)	Greece	4-1	ECQ	Tuncay Şanlı; Gökhan Ünal; Tümer Metin; Gökdeniz Karadeniz	UEFA
28 March 2007	Commerzbank-Arena, Frankfurt, Germany (H)	Norway	2-2	ECQ	Hamit Altıntop (2)	UEFA
2 June 2007	Asim Ferhatović Hase, Sarajevo, Bosnia and Herzegovina (A)	Bosnia and Herzegovina	2-3	ECQ	Hakan Şükür; Sabri Sarıoğlu	UEFA
5 June 2007	Signal Iduna Park, Dortmund, Germany	Brazil	0-0	Friendly		TFF (in Turkish)

Key

- H = Home match
- A = Away match
- F = Friendly
- ECQ = European Championship qualifier

== Honours ==
=== Club honours ===
Competition	Winner	Details	Match report
Süper Lig	Fenerbahçe S.K.	Turkcell Super League 2006-07	
Fortis Turkey Cup	Beşiktaş J.K.	Fortis Turkey Cup 2006-07	LigTV.com Report
Türk Telekom League A	Gençlerbirliği OFTAŞ	Türk Telekom League A 2006-07	
Iddaa League B	Boluspor	Iddaa League B 2006-07	
Turkish Third League	Diyarbakır B.B. DISKI (Group 1); BUGSAŞ (Group 2); Bozüyükspor (Group 3); Gaziosmanpaşa (Group 4)	Turkish Third League 2006-07	

=== Player honours ===
- Player of the Year
  - (Brazil) Alex
- Youth Player of the Year
  - (Turkey) Arda Turan

Team of the Year

Position	Nat.	Player	Club
GK	—	—	—
DF	—	—	—
DF	—	—	—
DF	—	—	—
DF	—	—	—
MF	—	—	—
MF	—	—	—
MF	—	—	—
MF	—	—	—
ST	—	—	—
ST	—	—	—

Top scorer

Nat.	Player	Goals
(Brazil)	Alex	19 goals

== Retirements ==
- 30 December 2006 – Mirosław Szymkowiak (Trabzonspor)
