= Fikret Yılmaz =

Turkish footballer and manager

Personal information
- Date of birth: 1 August 1957 (age 69)
- Place of birth: Adana, Turkey
- Position: Goalkeeper

Senior career*
Years	Team	Apps	(Gls)
1984–1987	Antalyaspor	24	(0)
1990	TKİ Tavşanlı Linyitspor	3	(0)
1990–1993	Kemer Belediyespor	68	(1)
Total		95	(1)

Managerial career
- 2009–2010: MKE Ankaragücü
- 2011–2012: Kayseri Erciyesspor
- 2014: Orduspor
- 2015–2016: Balıkesirspor
- * Club domestic league appearances and goals

Fikret Yılmaz (born 1 August 1957) is a Turkish football manager, and retired footballer best known for his stints as a goalkeeper with Antalyaspor in the Süper Lig, and as the father of the Turkish international footballer Burak Yılmaz.

== Career ==
Fikret was a goalkeeper in various teams in the top divisions of Turkey from the 1980s to the mid 90s. He made his professional debut in a 3–1 Süper Lig loss to Fenerbahçe S.K on 2 June 1985. He scored his only career goal for Kemerspor in a TFF Third League 2–1 loss to Antalya Köy Hizmetlerispor on 12 August 1991.

== Personal life ==
Fikret is the father of the Turkish international footballer Burak Yılmaz.
