= Coşkun Göğen =

Turkish actor

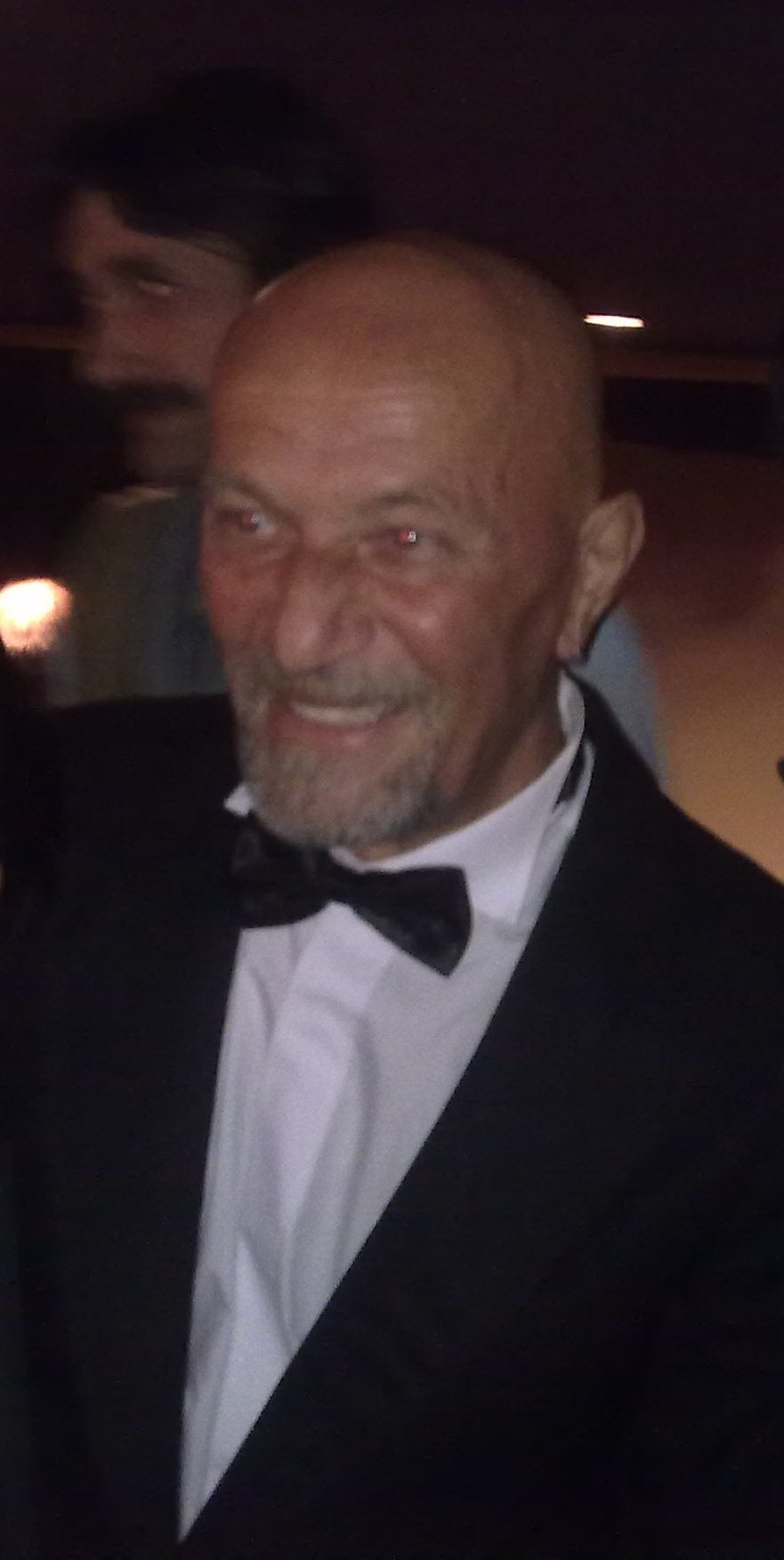

Coşkun Göğen (born June 14, 1946, Samatya, Istanbul) is a Turkish film and theatre actor.

He started his film career in 1972 with the film Asi Gençler. His most famous role was as "Tecavüzcü Coşkun" ("Coşkun the Rapist") which became of the most popular comedic characters in Turkish film history. He reprised this character on many films later due to the demands from the filmgoing public. He has acted in more than 400 films and theatre plays.

Coşkun Göğen is a fan of Antalyaspor football club. He has three daughters. In 2018, his 36-year-old daughter, Dünya Göğen, died of cancer.
