= Fatih Yiğen =

Turkish footballer

Personal information
- Full name: Fatih Yiğen
- Date of birth: 1 June 1983 (age 43)
- Place of birth: Kula, Turkey
- Height: 1.82 m (5 ft 11 1/2 in)
- Position: Defender

Team information
- Current team: Denizli Belediyespor

Youth career
- Denizlispor

Senior career*
Years	Team	Apps	(Gls)
2003–2006	Casale		
2006–2012	Denizlispor	119	(9)
2012–2014	Göztepe		
2014–2015	Altay		
2015–2016	Kızılcabölükspor		
2016–	Denizli Belediyespor		
- * Club domestic league appearances and goals as of 20 May 2012

Fatih Yiğen (born 1 June 1983) is a Turkish football defender who plays for Denizli Belediyespor.
