= Tuncer Kayalar =

Turkish diplomat

Undersecretary of the Prime Ministry for Foreign Trade
- In office 2002–2009

Turkish Ambassador and Permanent Representative (UN-HABITAT, UNEP) in Kenya
- In office 2009–2012

Personal details
- Born: 23 December 1952 (age 73) Ankara, Turkey

Tuncer Kayalar (born 23 December 1952 in Ankara, Turkey) is the former Undersecretary of the Prime Ministry for Foreign Trade, and the Former Chairman of the Board of Directors of both Turkish Eximbank and the Export Promotion Center of Turkey.

== Personal life and education ==
Tuncer Kayalar was born in Ankara, Turkey on 23 December 1952. He is a graduate of the TED Ankara College and attended the Australian National University and the Ankara Academy of Economic and Commercial Sciences earning his degree in international trade. Kayalar is married and has two daughters and grandchildren.

== Career ==
Tuncer Kayalar pursued a bureaucratic career for over 40 years in the areas of bilateral and multilateral economic and commercial relations and diplomacy.

He entered civil service as a rapporteur at the General Secretariat of Foreign Trade, MoC in 1977, and held positions as Director of Section (1986–88), Head of Department (1988–90), Counselor (1995–97), Deputy Director General (1998-2000) and Director General of Agreements (2000-2002) at the Under secretariat of the Prime Ministry for Foreign Trade. He was assigned on both occasions as a counselor (economic and commercial affairs) to the Turkish Embassy in Moscow, USSR(1982–85), and the Turkish Consulate in New York, USA (1990–95).

In 2002, during the presidency of Ahmet Necdet Sezer, he was appointed as the Undersecretary of the Prime Ministry for Foreign Trade. Simultaneously, he held the posts as Chairman of the Administrative Boards of Turkish EXIMBANK and the Export Promotion Center (IGEME) of Turkey. Kayalar was one of the leading figures behind Turkey's impressive foreign trade performance and the mastermind of Turkey's Economic and Commercial Development Strategy towards the Sub-Sahara African countries.

During his tenure, Kayalar also held membership at the Money-Credit Coordination Council, Science and Technology Supreme Council (TUBİTAK), National Productivity Center Advisory Board, Turkish Cooperation and Coordination Agency (TİKA) and Small and Medium Sized Industry Development and Support Administration.

In 2009, during the presidency of Abdullah Gul, Kayalar was appointed Ambassador and Permanent Representative accredited to the United Nations (UN-HABITAT and UNEP) in Kenya. He held these posts until 2012 and retired from civil service in 2019. Presently, he is the chairman of the advisory board of a Turkish foreign trade company in Ankara, Turkey.

During his career Kayalar published a number of articles and is the founder of “The Journal of International Trade and Diplomacy”. He is the recipient of various awards, namely being selected as the bureaucrat of the year in 2004 by the “Economists Platform”, (formation of the leading economists of Turkey) and the same title in 2005 by “Dünya” a prominent business newspaper.

Kayalar is a member of the New Jersey World Trade Council and the TED Ankara College Alumni.
