= Ali Bilgin =

German footballer (born 1981)

Personal information
- Date of birth: 17 December 1981 (age 44)
- Place of birth: Essen, West Germany
- Height: 1.83 m (6 ft 0 in)
- Position: Midfielder

Youth career
- Ballfreunde Bergeborbeck
- –1995: Rot-Weiss Essen
- 1995–1998: MSV Duisburg
- 1998–2000: Rot-Weiss Essen

Senior career*
| Years | Team | Apps | (Gls) |
| 2000–2006 | Rot-Weiss Essen | 120 | (23) |
| 2006–2007 | Antalyaspor | 29 | (6) |
| 2007–2010 | Fenerbahçe | 62 | (8) |
| 2010–2011 | Kayserispor | 15 | (2) |
| 2011–2012 | Kasımpaşa | 36 | (3) |
| 2013 | Göztepe | 7 | (1) |
| 2013–2014 | Sportfreunde Lotte | 10 | (1) |
| Total | | 279 | (44) |
- * Club domestic league appearances and goals

Ali Bilgin (born 17 December 1981) is a German former professional footballer who played as a midfielder.

== Career ==
Bilgin left Rot-Weiss Essen after helping the club achieve promotion to the 2. Bundesliga in the 2005–06 season.

Bilgin made his debut for Antalyaspor in a match against Sakaryaspor on 13 August 2006 as a 66th-minute substitute.

In summer 2007, after an impressive season at Antalyaspor, he moved to Fenerbahçe, signing a contract for 3+1 years. During his time with Fenerbahçe he was kept out of action by a meniscus injury, a concussion and a viral infection. He made seven appearances in the UEFA Champions League and missed out on the Süper Lig championship on the last day of the 2009–10 season.

In summer 2011, after agreeing the termination of his contract with Kayserispor, Bilgin trained with the reserves of former club Rot-Weiss Essen.

== Personal life ==
Bilgin grew up in Bergeborbeck. He is married with twins. As of 2021 he had been living in Istanbul for ten years.
