= Mehmet Yozgatlı =

Turkish former footballer (born 1979)

Personal information
- Full name: Mehmet Yozgatlı
- Date of birth: 9 January 1979 (age 47)
- Place of birth: Melle, Germany
- Height: 1.81 m (5 ft 11 1/2 in)
- Position: Winger

Youth career
- 1989–1993: SV Sandhausen
- 1993–1997: Istanbulspor

Senior career*
Years	Team	Apps	(Gls)
1997–2004	Istanbulspor	98	(41)
1999–2000	→ Galatasaray (loan)	9	(2)
2000–2001	→ Adanaspor (loan)	16	(10)
2004–2007	Fenerbahçe	84	(5)
2007–2008	Beşiktaş	8	(0)
2008–2010	Gaziantepspor	30	(4)
2010–2011	Gençlerbirliği	0	(0)
2011	Çaykur Rizespor	8	(0)

International career
1999	Turkey U19	1	(0)
2001	Turkey U21	6	(5)
2004	Turkey A2	3	(1)

Managerial career
- 2012–2013: Eyüpspor (assistant)
- 2015: Karabükspor (assistant)
- 2019: Karaköprü Belediyespor
- 2019: Utaş Uşakspor
- 2019–2020: Alanyaspor (assistant)
- 2020–2021: Fenerbahçe (assistant)
- * Club domestic league appearances and goals

Mehmet Yozgatlı (born January 9, 1979) is a Turkish former footballer who played as a winger and is currently an assistant manager of Fenerbahçe.

== Career ==
=== Club ===
Mehmet signed a 3 1/2-year contract with Fenerbahçe on January 30, 2004. His debut for Fenerbahçe came on February 1, 2004. He was on the Galatasaray S.K. squad that won the 2000 UEFA Cup. On 18 June 2007, he signed a 2+1-year contract with Beşiktaş J.K. This contract was cancelled by Beşiktaş after one season. On 7 January 2011, he agreed to a one-year contract with Çaykur Rizespor.

=== Coaching ===
On 27 February 2019, he was appointed as manager of Utaş Uşakspor, competing at TFF Second League. He left the position at the end of the season and was appointed assistant manager of Alanyaspor.

== Honours ==
Galatasaray

- Turkish Super League: 1999–00
- UEFA Cup: 2000

Fenerbahçe

- Turkish Super League: 2004-05, 2006-07
