= Recep Biler =

Turkish goalkeeper

Personal information
- Date of birth: May 8, 1981 (age 45)
- Place of birth: İzmir, Turkey
- Height: 1.93 m (6 ft 4 in)
- Position: Goalkeeper

Senior career*
Years	Team	Apps	(Gls)
2000–2007	Fenerbahçe	21	(0)
2005–2007	→ Karşıyaka	47	(0)
2007–2009	Hacettepe	52	(0)
2009–2010	Gaziantepspor	1	(0)
2010–2011	Manisaspor	2	(0)
2011–2012	Altay SK	29	(0)
2012–2013	Balıkesirspor	12	(0)
2013–2014	Karşıyaka SK	4	(0)
2014–2015	Turgutluspor	0	(0)
2015	Giresunspor	1	(0)
- * Club domestic league appearances and goals

Recep Biler (born May 8, 1981) is a former Turkish goalkeeper. He is 1.93 m tall and weighs 80 kg. He is a goalkeeper and transferred from 2000 to 2001 season from Yeni Turgutluspor to Fenerbahçe. He debuted on 29 November 2000 for Siirtspor Turkish Cup 3rd round match.

He played for Turkish National Youth Teams U-18 and U-21.

== Honours ==
- 2001 Turkish Super League Champion with Fenerbahçe
- 2004 Turkish Super League Champion with Fenerbahçe
- 2005 Turkish Super League Champion with Fenerbahçe
