= Murat Ocak =

Turkish professional footballer (born 1982)

Personal information
- Date of birth: 1 January 1982 (age 44)
- Place of birth: Bafra, Turkey
- Height: 1.82 m (6 ft 0 in)
- Position: Defender

Senior career*
Years	Team	Apps	(Gls)
2001–2003	Çarşambaspor		
2003–2005	Çorumspor		
2005–2006	Istanbul B.B.	32	(0)
2006–2008	Trabzonspor	11	(0)
2007	→ Ankaragücü (loan)	5	(0)
2007–2008	→ Istanbul B.B. (loan)	10	(1)
2008–2010	Çaykur Rizespor	8	(0)
2010–2011	Karşıyaka	4	(0)
2011–2012	Altay	2	(0)
2012–2013	Giresunspor	13	(0)
2013–2014	Pazarspor	10	(0)
2014–2015	68 Yeni Aksarayspor	11	(0)

International career
2006	Turkey	3	(0)
- * Club domestic league appearances and goals as of 6 September 2015

Murat Ocak (born 1 January 1982, in Bafra) is a former Turkish professional footballer. He retired from professional football in 2015.

== Club career ==
Ocak joined Çaykur Rizespor from Trabzonspor in August 2008. He joined Trabzonspor in July 2006, and went on loan to Ankaragücü and Istanbul Büyükşehir Belediyespor during 2007 and 2008.

== International career ==
Ocak has made three appearances for the full Turkey national football team, his debut coming in a friendly against Estonia on 28 May 2006.
