= Murat Hacıoğlu =

Turkish footballer

Personal information
- Date of birth: 10 June 1979 (age 47)
- Place of birth: Ardeşen, Rize Province, Turkey
- Height: 1.70 m (5 ft 7 in)
- Position: Midfielder

Team information
- Current team: Sakaryaspor
- Number: 10

Senior career*
| Years | Team | Apps | (Gls) |
| 2002–2004 | Diyarbakırspor | 63 | (22) |
| 2004–2007 | Fenerbahçe | 12 | (1) |
| 2005–2006 | → Konyaspor (loan) | 33 | (7) |
| 2007 | → Ankaraspor (loan) | 18 | (0) |
| 2007–2008 | Konyaspor | 34 | (9) |
| 2008–2009 | Kocaelispor | 29 | (4) |
| 2009–2010 | Denizlispor | 8 | (0) |
| 2010 | Kocaelispor | 15 | (0) |
| 2010–2011 | Altay | 41 | (5) |
| 2011–2012 | Çaykur Rizespor | 24 | (0) |
| 2013 | Gaziosmanpaşaspor | 15 | (2) |
| 2013–2014 | Sarıyer | 30 | (1) |
| 2014–2016 | Etimesgut Belediyespor | 64 | (20) |
| 2016– | Sakaryaspor | 16 | (2) |

International career
| 2004 | Turkey | 4 | (0) |
- * Club domestic league appearances and goals as of 24 August 2015

Murat Hacıoğlu (born 10 June 1979) is a Turkish footballer, who plays for Sakaryaspor. He previously played for Etimesgut Şekerspor, Diyarbakırspor, Konyaspor, and Fenerbahçe SK.

After his successful seasons at different Anatolian clubs, he joined to the Istanbul club Fenerbahçe SK. Under the control of Christoph Daum, he could not find enough chance to play and usually waited as a substitute. He was loaned out to Konyaspor for the 2005–06 season. Getting chances to showcase his talent, Murat played inconsistently and failed to impress the Fenerbahçe board and coaches. He was subsequently transferred to Kocaelispor. He has been capped by the Turkey national football team.
