= Olgay Coşkun =

Turkish footballer

Personal information
- Full name: Olgay Coşkun
- Date of birth: 9 February 1984 (age 42)
- Place of birth: Susurluk, Turkey
- Height: 1.74 m (5 ft 8 1/2 in)
- Position: Midfielder

Team information
- Current team: Nilüfer Erdemlispor

Youth career
- –2001: Susurlukspor

Senior career*
Years	Team	Apps	(Gls)
2001–2002	Mobellaspor	22	(1)
2002–2004	Petkimspor	56	(4)
2004–2007	Karşıyaka	86	(1)
2007–2010	Hacettepe	51	(0)
2010–2011	Karşıyaka	5	(0)
2011–2013	Kartalspor	44	(0)
2013–2014	Altınordu	13	(0)
2014–2015	Konya Şeker	5	(0)
2015–2016	Gaziosmanpaşaspor	9	(0)
2016–	Nilüfer Erdemlispor	0	(0)
- * Club domestic league appearances and goals as of 10 August 2015

Olgay Coşkun (born 9 February 1984 in Susurluk) is a Turkish footballer who plays for Nilüfer Erdemli.

On May 31, 2007, he transferred to Gençlerbirliği S.K. from Karşıyaka S.K.
