= Tümer Metin =

Turkish footballer and pundit

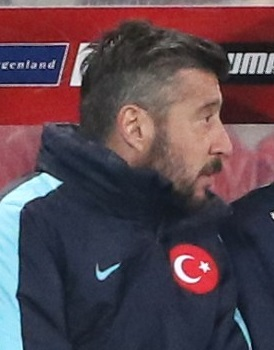

Personal information
- Date of birth: 14 October 1974 (age 52)
- Place of birth: Zonguldak, Turkey
- Height: 1.74 m (5 ft 9 in)
- Positions: Attacking midfielder; winger

Youth career
- 1993–1994: Kilimli Belediyespor

Senior career*
Years	Team	Apps	(Gls)
1994–1997	Zonguldakspor	61	(13)
1997–2001	Samsunspor	94	(13)
2001–2006	Beşiktaş	134	(32)
2006–2008	Fenerbahçe	67	(21)
2008–2011	AEL	79	(23)
2011–2012	Kerkyra	5	(1)
Total		440	(103)

International career
2003–2008	Turkey	26	(7)
- * Club domestic league appearances and goals

Tümer Metin (born 14 October 1974) is a Turkish former professional footballer and current pundit.

Metin achieved numerous titles during his career, including Süper Lig titles for both Beşiktaş J.K. and Fenerbahçe S.K., the former of which he played over 100 matches for. At international level, he scored 7 goals in 26 appearances for the Turkey national team. After retiring from international duty, Metin spent the latter years of his career in Greece.

== Career ==
Metin was born in Zonguldak. After playing for four years at Samsunspor, he was transferred to Beşiktaş, along with team-mate İlhan Mansız in 2001. He signed a contract with Fenerbahçe in June 2006 after spending five years at Beşiktaş.

Metin's star shone brightly in Europe during the 2006–07 UEFA Cup Round of 32 tie against AZ Alkmaar. In the first leg in Istanbul Metin contributed the Yellow Canaries' first goal as well as the equalizing brace which made the final score 3–3. The second brace was much more spectacular in that his run came from just within the midfield line and his shot, a cracker from the top corner of the 16 yard box, was placed precisely in the top corner of the goal. Metin also scored the opening goal in the reverse fixture in Alkmaar, a precise curling shot into the side netting, but unfortunately for him the result of the match was 2–2, sending Fenerbahçe out of the competition via away goals.

During the January 2008 transfer window, Fenerbahçe sent Metin to Greek Super League side AEL, with the loan period to expire in June 2008. So far Metin has found success in Greece, even scoring his first goal in his debut for the new outfit. On 9 August 2011, he signed a one-year contract with Kerkyra. He announced his retirement on 9 December 2011.

== Post-retirement ==
After retirement he penned a memoir, titled "Metin Olmak", published in May 2013. His book includes damning behind-the-scenes revelations on his conflicts with Mircea Lucescu and Rıza Çalımbay, some wonderful exchanges with Vicente Del Bosque, and the accounts of his personal transformation during his later career years in Greece.

In 2019 September Metin joined TRT Spor for punditry.

== Personal life ==
Metin is a Beşiktaş J.K. fan. He has a tattoo stating "Only God can judge me". In 2019, Metin dated Turkish actress Gamze Topuz, who was featured in Turkish TV series including Aşk ve Ceza.

== Honours ==
Beşiktaş

- Süper Lig: 2003
- Turkish Cup: 2006

Fenerbahçe

- Süper Lig: 2007
- Turkish Super Cup: 2007

Turkey

- UEFA European Championship Semi Final: 2008
