= Onur Tuncer =

Turkish footballer

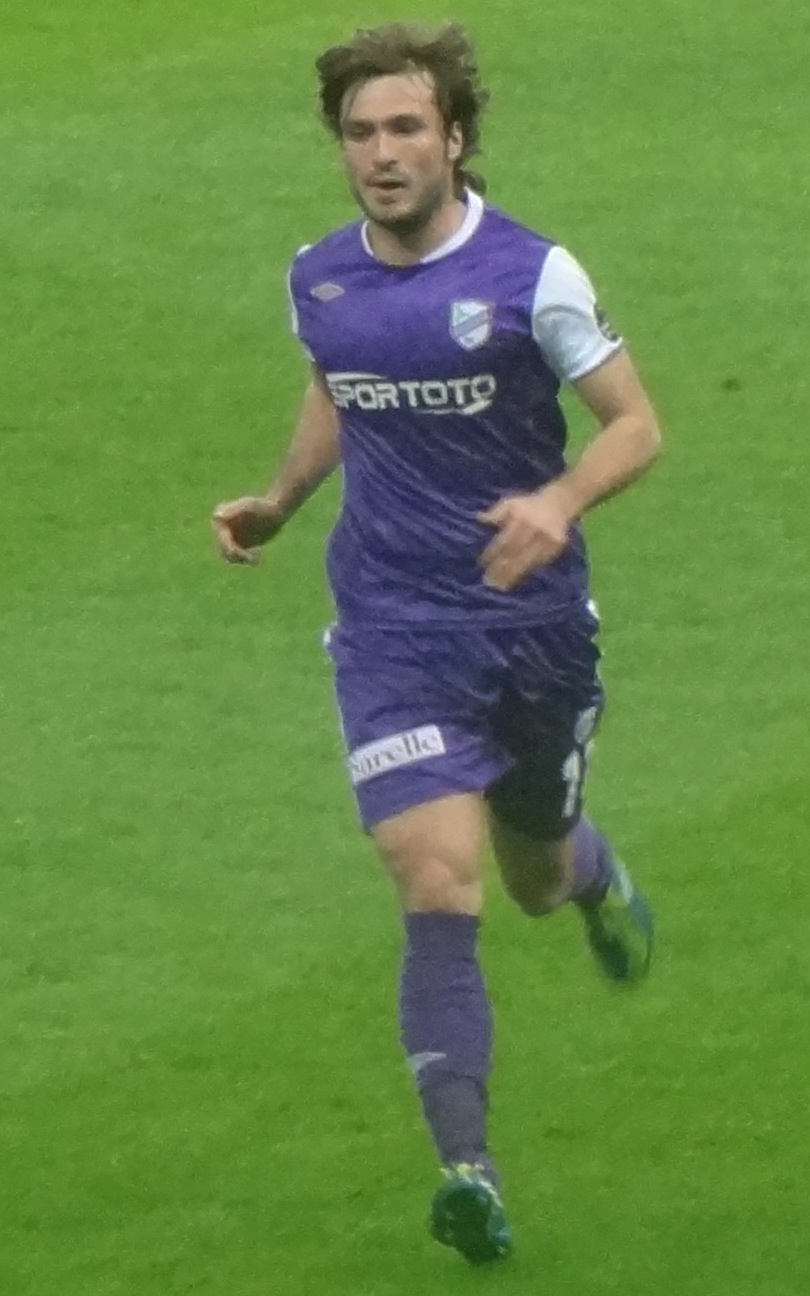

Personal information
- Full name: Onur Tuncer
- Date of birth: 19 February 1984 (age 42)
- Place of birth: Kocaeli, Turkey
- Height: 1.75 m (5 ft 9 in)
- Position: Midfielder

Youth career
- 2002–2003: Antalyaspor
- Fenerbahçe PAF

Senior career*
Years	Team	Apps	(Gls)
2002–2003	İstanbulspor	12	(0)
2003–2004	Fenerbahçe PAF	46	(1)
2004–2005	→ Sivasspor (loan)	26	(0)
2005–2006	→ Antalyaspor (loan)	21	(0)
2006–2007	→ Mardinspor (loan)		
2007	Fenerbahçe	0	(0)
2008–2010	Sivasspor	30	(0)
2010	Boluspor	3	(0)
2010–2011	Bucaspor	18	(0)
2011–2013	Orduspor	23	(0)
2013	Gaziantep B.B.	7	(0)
2013–2014	Antalyaspor		
2014	Adana Demirspor		
2014–2016	Yeni Malatyaspor		

International career
2006	Turkey U21	2	(0)
- * Club domestic league appearances and goals

Onur Tuncer (born 19 February 1984 in Kocaeli, Turkey) is a Turkish football player who last played for Yeni Malatyaspor.

== Career ==
He transferred from İstanbulspor and been a player for youth team of Fenerbahçe till 2004. Fenerbahçe decided to loan him for 2004–05 season to Sivasspor, for 2005–06 season to Antalyaspor and for 2006–07 season to Mardinspor.
