= Mateus Paraná =

Brazilian footballer

Personal information
- Full name: Edson Edmar Dias de Souza
- Date of birth: 21 May 1987 (age 39)
- Place of birth: Arapongas, Brazil
- Height: 1.73 m (5 ft 8 in)
- Position: Forward

Team information
- Current team: Operário (PR)

Senior career*
Years	Team	Apps	(Gls)
2005–2006	Iraty	5	(0)
2006–	Rentistas/Fenerbahçe	0	(0)
2006–2007	→ Bursaspor (loan)	13	(1)
2007	→ Ankaraspor (loan)	0	(0)
2008	→ Coritiba (loan)	0	(0)
2008	Fortaleza	2	(0)
2009	Iraty	0	(0)
2009	→ São Caetano (loan)	8	(0)
2010	Fluminense	0	(0)
2011	Operário (PR)	3	(0)
2011	Atlético Ibirama	0	(0)
2011–	Londrina (PR)	0	(0)
- * Club domestic league appearances and goals

Edson Edmar Dias de Souza (born 21 May 1987), known as Mateus Paraná (literally Matthew of Paraná), is a Brazilian footballer.

== Turkey ==
In July 2006, he was bought by Turkish club Fenerbahçe from Iraty by Fenerbahçe Manager Zico and Uruguayan player agent Juan Figer's references. Due to foreigner restrictions in Turkey, Mateus Paraná was immediately loaned out to Bursaspor for one year. Mateus Paraná also registered as a player of Rentistas, which the club was associated with Juan Figer as a proxy.

He scored his first goal in the Süper Lig against Galatasaray on 10 December 2006 in a 3–1 loss. He also played for Fenerbahçe in pre-season in July 2007.

He was loaned to Ankaraspor until June 2008 but his contract cancelled on 20 December 2007. He did not made his debut for Ankaraspor.

== Return to Brazil ==
In January 2008 he returned to Paraná state for Coritiba, winning the state championship. In September he left for Fortaleza.

In January 2009 he returned to Iraty and in June signed by São Caetano. In January 2010 he was signed by Fluminense. he left the club in June.

In January 2011 he returned to Paraná again, scored 8 goals in the state league. His loan was extended in June.

== Career statistics ==
Club performance			League		Cup		League Cup		Total	
Season	Club	League	Apps	Goals	Apps	Goals	Apps	Goals	Apps	Goals
Brazil			League		Copa do Brasil		League Cup		Total	
2005	Iraty	Série C	5	0			?	?	?	?
2006	Iraty	Nil			3	0	?	?	?	?
Turkey			League		Turkish Cup		League Cup		Total	
2006–07	Bursaspor	Süper Lig	13	1	4	1			17	2
2007–08	Ankaraspor	Süper Lig	0	0	0	0			0	0
Brazil			League		Copa do Brasil		League Cup		Total	
2008	Coritiba	Série A	0	0	1	0	9	1	10	1
2008	Fortaleza	Série B	2	0					2	0
2009	Iraty	Nil					10+2	3+1	12	4
2009	São Caetano	Série B	8	0					8	0
2010	Fluminense	Série A	0	0	0	0	0	0	0	0
2011	Operário (PR)	Série D	3	0			13	8	16	8
Total	Brazil		18	0	4	0	?	?	?	?
Total	Turkey		13	1	4	1			17	2
Career total			31	1	8	1	?	?	?	?

- Note: State Leagues were marked as League Cup
