= Mahmut Hanefi Erdoğdu =

Turkish footballer

Mahmut Hanefi
Personal information
- Full name: Mahmut Hanefi Erdoğdu
- Date of birth: 1 June 1983 (age 43)
- Place of birth: Karasu, Turkey
- Position: Left back

Team information
- Current team: Sivasspor

Youth career
- 1998–1999: Sakaryaspor

Senior career*
Years	Team	Apps	(Gls)
1999–2003	Sakaryaspor	65	(2)
1999–2000	Ayvalıkgücü	21	(0)
2000–2001	Mudurnuspor	6	(0)
2003–2008	Fenerbahçe	34	(1)
2006–2007	Gaziantepspor(loan)		
2007–2008	Sivasspor		
2008–2010	Diyarbakırspor		
2010–2011	Sakaryaspor		
- * Club domestic league appearances and goals

Mahmut Hanefi Erdoğdu (born 1 June 1983) is a Turkish footballer playing for the Turkish Super League club Diyarbakirspor. Erdoğdu plays at the defender position. He is 180 cm tall and weighs 79 kilograms. His playing style and hair type is often similar to Brazilian star Roberto Carlos and is called "Carlos" among his teammates.

== Honours ==
- 2004 Turkish Super League Champion with Fenerbahçe
- 2005 Turkish Super League Champion with Fenerbahçe
