= Gürhan Gürsoy =

Bulgarian-born Turkish footballer

Personal information
- Full name: Gürhan Gürsoy
- Date of birth: September 24, 1987 (age 39)
- Place of birth: Kardzhali, Bulgaria
- Height: 1.70 m (5 ft 7 in)
- Position: Midfielder

Youth career
- Rodopi Momchilgrad
- Arda Kardzhali
- 2000–2002: IFK Norrköping

Senior career*
Years	Team	Apps	(Gls)
2002–2004	Adanaspor	20	(1)
2004–2010	Fenerbahçe	9	(0)
2006–2007	→ Sivasspor (loan)	19	(2)
2009–2010	→ Antalyaspor (loan)	8	(0)
2010–2011	Bugsaş Spor	23	(7)
2011–2012	Göztepe	17	(0)
2012–2014	Hatayspor	39	(11)
2014–2015	Sarıyer	13	(0)
2015–2017	Tepecikspor	8	(3)
2017–2018	Nazilli Belediyespor	14	(3)

International career
2002	Turkey U16	4	(0)
2002–2004	Turkey U17	31	(9)
2003	Turkey U18	4	(1)
2004–2006	Turkey U19	19	(4)
2005	Turkey U20	6	(0)
2007	Turkey U21	4	(0)
- * Club domestic league appearances and goals as of 23 August 2015

Gürhan Gürsoy (born 24 September 1987) is a retired professional footballer. Born in Bulgaria, he represented Turkey internationally.

== Playing career ==
Gürsoy initially played for FC Arda Kardzhali in his hometown, before moving to Sweden and playing for IFK Norrköping. He joined Adanaspor in 2002 as the youngest player in the league at the time, and was transferred from Adanapsor to Fenerbahçe in June 2004. He was loaned to Sivasspor in 2006, and on 12 July 2009, he was sent to Antalyaspor on loan for 1 year. In 2010, Fenerbahçe did not renew his contract and he was transferred to Mamak FK.
