= Tuncay Şanlı =

Turkish football manager (born 1982)

Tuncay
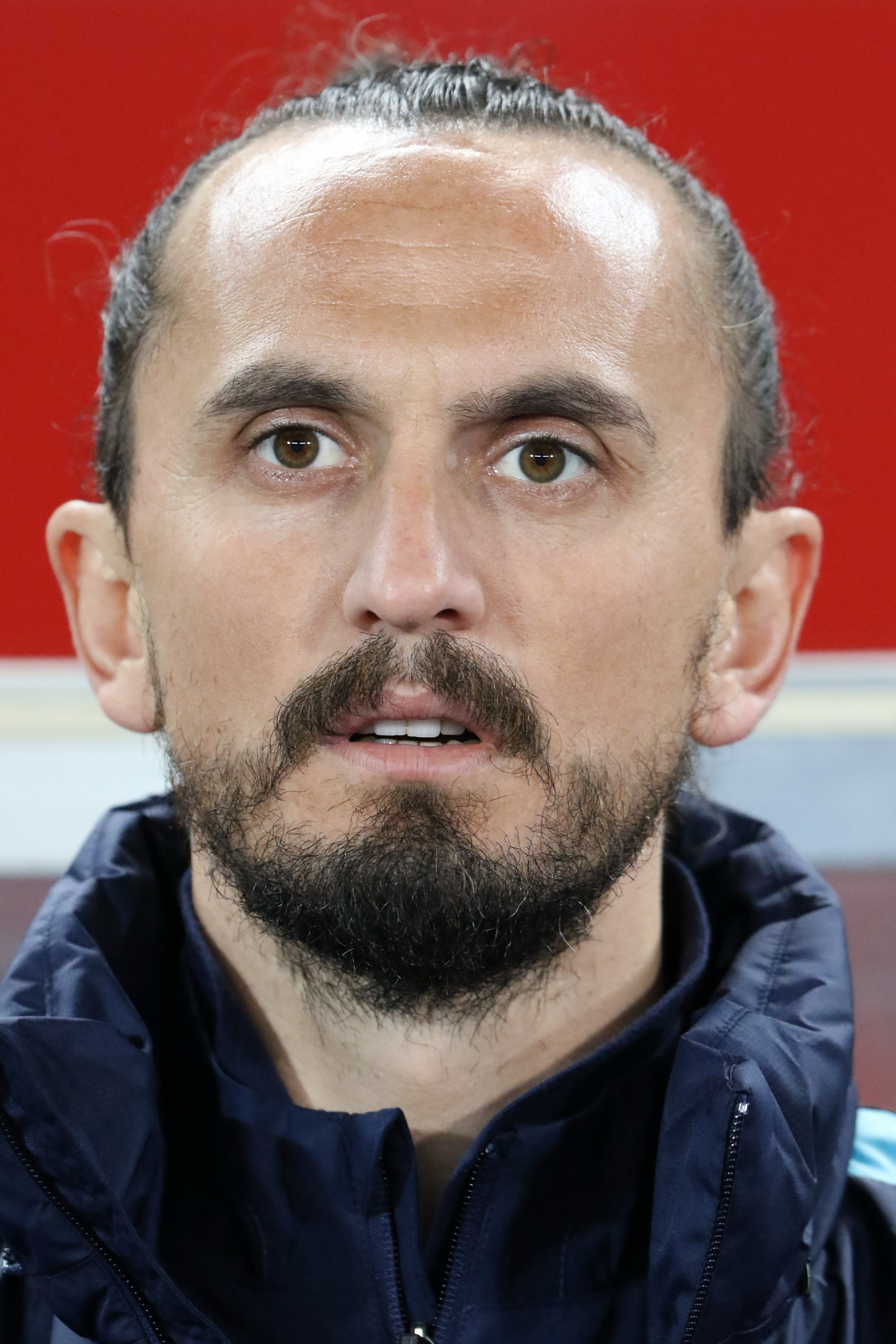
- Tuncay in 2016

Personal information
- Full name: Tuncay Şanlı
- Date of birth: 16 January 1982 (age 44)
- Place of birth: Sakarya, Turkey
- Height: 1.82 m (6 ft 0 in)
- Positions: Midfielder; forward

Youth career
- 1999–2000: Sakaryaspor

Senior career*
Years	Team	Apps	(Gls)
2000–2002	Sakaryaspor	66	(32)
2002–2007	Fenerbahçe	154	(59)
2007–2009	Middlesbrough	70	(17)
2009–2011	Stoke City	44	(5)
2011–2012	VfL Wolfsburg	4	(0)
2011–2012	→ Bolton Wanderers (loan)	16	(0)
2012–2014	Bursaspor	39	(1)
2014–2015	Umm Salal	26	(11)
2015	Pune City	10	(3)
Total		429	(128)

International career
2000	Turkey U17	2	(0)
2000	Turkey U18	11	(6)
2001	Turkey U20	6	(3)
2002–2003	Turkey U21	14	(9)
2002–2010	Turkey	80	(22)

Managerial career
- 2016–2017: Sakaryaspor
- 2022–2024: Sakaryaspor
- 2024: Ümraniyespor
- 2025: Çorum
Medal record
Men's Football
Representing Turkey
FIFA Confederations Cup
Third place	2003 France
- * Club domestic league appearances and goals

Tuncay Şanlı (Turkish pronunciation: [tunˈdʒaj ˈʃanɫɯ]; born 16 January 1982), often known mononymously as Tuncay, is a Turkish professional football manager and former player.

He naturally played as a striker, but was also positioned as an attacking midfielder and on either wing. He was in the Turkey team that finished in third place in both the 2003 Confederations Cup and the 2008 European Championships. With 22 international goals in 80 caps, he is Turkey's third-highest scorer of all time, and tenth-most capped player.

Tuncay began his career with his local club, Sakaryaspor before joining one of the largest clubs in Turkey, Fenerbahçe in 2002. He became a popular player at the Şükrü Saracoğlu Stadium and he made international headlines after he scored a hat-trick against Manchester United in the UEFA Champions League in December 2004. After winning three Süper Lig titles with Fenerbahçe he left for English club Middlesbrough on a free transfer.

Tuncay spent two seasons with Middlesbrough and won the player of the year award in 2009, but he was unable to help them avoid relegation. Following their relegation Tuncay joined Stoke City in August 2009 for a fee of £5 million. He was unable to earn a regular place under manager Tony Pulis and joined German side VfL Wolfsburg in January 2010. He failed to settle in Germany and returned to England in 2011–12 with Bolton Wanderers. Tuncay then went on to play for Bursaspor and Qatar side Umm Salal.

== Club career ==
=== Fenerbahçe ===
Tuncay caught the eye of Turkish Süper Lig giants Fenerbahçe in 2002 at the age of 20 after impressive displays for his hometown club Sakaryaspor in the Turkish second tier. He signed a five-year contract with Fenerbahçe, and during this time, he won the Turkish league title on three occasions. He made his competitive debut for Fenerbahçe in a Süper Lig match against Gaziantepspor on 11 September 2002. On 8 December 2004, Tuncay became only the second person to ever score a Champions League hat-trick against Manchester United, and the first Turkish person to score a hat-trick in the Champions League. During his five years at the club, he scored a total of 12 Champions League goals in 26 appearances for Fenerbahçe. His first being against Panathinaikos in a 4–1 defeat in the second round of the 2002–03 UEFA Cup. After he had left Fenerbahçe, his former manager, Brazilian Legend Zico, stated: "Tuncay has been a great loss to us, he was the one giving us the soul and the hope. Now that he is gone we miss that piece of soul and hope. He is a great person, and I wish him the best of luck in his new team. Even though he is now gone, I still wish he will come back."

=== Middlesbrough ===
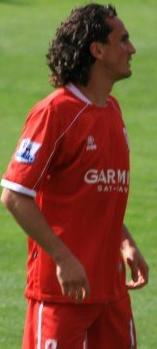
Tuncay playing for Middlesbrough in 2009.

On 13 June 2007, Middlesbrough confirmed they had agreed personal terms with Tuncay and the move was now subject to a medical. Tuncay arrived in Middlesbrough on 18 June 2007, having signed a four-year contract. After passing his medical on 22 June 2007, he attained a work permit on 4 July 2007, and completed his free transfer. In July 2007, Tuncay was interviewed by the Evening Gazette and talked about his ambitions for the upcoming season. He said: "My aim was to play in Europe one day and I have done that in previous seasons. It is also very important for me to play in the Premier League and that, too, is going to happen. But I want to get Middlesbrough back into Europe. That is my target." On 15 July 2007, Tuncay made his debut in a Boro shirt against German team Schalke 04 in Austria. Known for his passionate affinity with fans at his beloved Fenerbahçe, Tuncay developed the same kind of relationship with the fans of Middlesbrough. His efforts were not unnoticed, with Middlesbrough supporters singing in his favour, "We've only got one player!" in reference to their admiration of his non-stop attitude.

Tuncay's endless energy and passion shown during matches has won him many plaudits. In May 2009, Matt Le Tissier of Sky Sports acknowledged his performances: "If they [Boro] had 11 Tuncay's they'd be in the top half of the table; this boy is quality, he works his socks off as well. He showed great technique with the overhead kick and was a great example for the rest of the team – it's just a shame there are not a few more like him in the side." The 2008–09 season saw him pick up all four of the club's major awards for 2009: the Players Player of the Year, Garmin Player of the Year, the Middlesbrough F.C. Official Supporters' Club Prize and the Terrace Legends Award. He won the Player of the Year with a massive 75% of the vote.

Although the 2008–09 season was a successful one for Tuncay, Middlesbrough were relegated to the Championship after a terrible season, which saw them create a new club-record, and match a League record of 12 consecutive away defeats. Tuncay had expressed his desire to continue playing in the Premier League. However, he began the 2009–10 season as a Boro player and played in 3 matches in the Championship, coming on as a substitute in all 3 games. He scored two goals in the process: the third goal in a 3–0 victory away to Swansea City in the second league game of the season, and the following week, scored the first goal in a 2–0 victory against Doncaster Rovers, scoring within 60 seconds of coming on. He turned down the chance to move abroad, after German Bundesliga clubs Wolfsburg and Stuttgart and Spanish La Liga side Villarreal making offers for him, in favour of staying in England. Prior to the end of the transfer window, he left Middlesbrough and joined Premier League side Stoke City.

==== 2007–08 season ====
Tuncay took time to settle in the Premier League. He went 12 league games without a goal but then scored three in three games. The first was a headed goal from a Luke Young cross, on 1 December 2007 in a 1–1 draw against Reading. The second, the following week, was the winner in a 2–1 victory over Arsenal. His third, in a 1–0 victory over Derby County, was a superb volley from a Stewart Downing cross which won the BBC Match of the Day Goal of the Month award for December 2007, and was later nominated for Goal of the Season.

On 29 December 2007, he scored his fourth goal in Boro's 1–0 away victory against Portsmouth which was the first time in 54 years that Middlesbrough had won at Fratton Park in the top flight. His next goal was a seventh-minute header against Liverpool to give Middlesbrough the lead. However, a Fernando Torres hattrick, meant Middlesbrough lost 3–2 at Anfield. On the 31st match day of the season he again scored the winning goal against Derby County in a match that ended 1–0. Tuncay then scored two goals against Sunderland and Portsmouth later on in the season to take his tally to eight goals for the season. In his first season for Middlesbrough he was their second leading goal scorer behind Stewart Downing with nine.

==== 2008–09 season ====
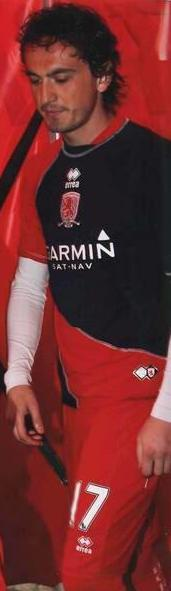
Tuncay with Middlesbrough in September 2008

Tuncay started off the season brightly, his first league goal being the winner against Stoke City, in the third league game of the season. After a knee injury while playing for Turkey against Belgium in the World Cup Qualifiers in early September 2008, Tuncay was sidelined for five weeks. He returned to first team action against Blackburn Rovers on 10 October, and scored an overhead kick goal which was wrongly ruled out for offside. Tuncay scored his first brace in the Premier League in a 2–1 away win at Aston Villa on 9 November 2008.

In December 2008, newspapers speculated that he was wanted by Chelsea in the January 2009 transfer window; Gareth Southgate laughed off the rumours suggesting that Chelsea could get him for such a small fee, saying that if he was even to start to consider selling him, then Chelsea's bid would have to be much higher. Tuncay scored two goals in as many games; during his side's 2–0 victories over both West Ham in the FA Cup and against Liverpool in the league, with the latter bringing an end to both Liverpool's 15-match unbeaten run, and Boro's 14-match winless run in the league. The win against West Ham takes Boro to their fourth Quarter Final in the FA Cup in four consecutive seasons. Against Tottenham in March, he had 2 goals again ruled out for offside, in a game which Tottenham defeated Boro 4–0. April 2009 saw Tuncay score Boro's quickest goal of the season, just 3 minutes into the game. The match, against Hull City, finished 3–1 to Middlesbrough in what was described as a "must-win game" by manager Gareth Southgate.

In May 2009 he was named Boro's Player of the Year. On 16 May, in the penultimate game of the season, he scored a superb overhead kick goal against Aston Villa, which won him another BBC Goal of the Month award. In the vital game, an injury to captain Stewart Downing in the 23-minute meant that Tuncay took the captain's armband. This was the first time he has played as captain for Boro, and played a vital role in midfield. Despite Tuncay's efforts, Middlesbrough were relegated at the end of the 2008–09 season after suffering a 2–1 defeat away to West Ham. Middlesbrough had spent the whole second half of the season in the relegation zone. In the final game of the season Tuncay, Boro's captain, provided the assist to Boro's goal, however could not lead Middlesbrough to the win they desperately needed. In a disappointing season which saw Boro score only 28 league goals, Tuncay ended the season as their top scorer with 7 league goals, a quarter of Boro's total.

=== Stoke City ===
Tuncay signed for Stoke City on 28 August 2009 for a fee of £5 million and signed a four-year contract. He became manager Tony Pulis' fifth signing of the summer transfer window, having also signed his Middlesbrough teammate Robert Huth the previous day. He was eligible to play for Stoke the day after his transfer in the fourth league game of the season, and made his debut coming on as a substitute for Ricardo Fuller in the 84th minute, against Sunderland at the Britannia Stadium. He made his first start for Stoke in a third-round League Cup game against Blackpool, setting up two goals and winning a penalty. He continued to make only brief substitute appearances in the Premier League. A significant moment came during an away match to Hull on 8 November 2009, in which he was substituted off in the 87th minute after only coming on six minutes earlier. Although much was made after the event, Tuncay subsequently denied rumours that he was unhappy and insisted that his future lies with the Premier League club. After eight brief substitute league appearances, he made his first start away to Arsenal on 5 December 2009. He scored his first goal for Stoke in the Premier League on 12 December 2009 in a home match against Wigan. He also scored the first premier league goal of 2010 when he headed a 12th-minute goal against Fulham on 5 January. Over the course of the season Tuncay only started 13 games.

During pre-season for the 2010–11, Tuncay scored five goals in five games. However, the season started with Tuncay making just a handful of substitute appearances in the League. He has stated that he would like to be playing regular first team football, and would consider a move away in January 2011 in order to find this. He scored his first goal of the season against Shrewsbury Town in the League Cup. He followed this up with a stunning goal against Manchester United on 24 October 2010. On 27 November 2010, Tuncay played a major role in the 92nd minute against Manchester City, assisting Matthew Etherington for an equalising goal in a 1–1 draw. Tuncay made his final appearance for Stoke City against Fulham in the Premier League on 22 January 2011. He left Stoke on the final day of the January transfer window joining German side Wolfsburg.

=== VfL Wolfsburg ===
Tuncay joined German side Wolfsburg on 31 January for a fee of €5.2 million. On 25 July 2012, he was released when his contract which was still running until June 2014 was cancelled in mutual consent after making only five appearances.

==== Bolton Wanderers (loan) ====
On 11 August 2011, Tuncay agreed to sign for Bolton Wanderers on loan for the 2011–12 season with a view to a £3 million permanent move at the loan's conclusion. The clearance was given on 23 August and Tuncay scored on his Bolton Wanderers debut in the League Cup tie against Macclesfield Town a day later. He made his league debut on 27 August, coming on as a substitute for Chris Eagles in Bolton's 3–1 defeat at Liverpool. Tuncay made 22 appearances for Bolton in 2011–12 as the Trotters suffered relegation on the final day of the season.

=== Bursaspor ===
Tuncay joined Bursaspor on 3 September 2012. On 5 February 2014, his contract was mutually terminated.

=== Umm Salal ===
On 31 July 2014, Tuncay signed a one-year deal with Qatar Stars League side Umm Salal.

=== Pune City ===
Tuncay was signed by Indian Super League Side FC Pune City to play with them for their Second Season. On his first match with the Pune on 5 October 2015, he scored 2 goals and became man of the match.

== International career ==
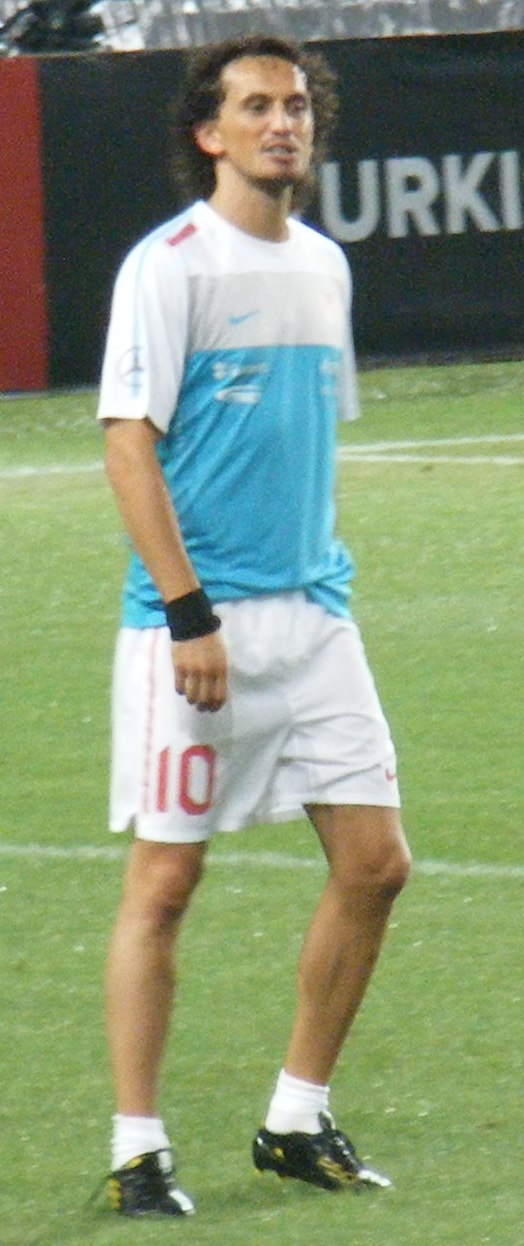
Tuncay warming up for friendly game against Romania in August 2010

=== Senior team ===
For a period of time Tuncay was the vice-captain of the Turkey national team behind the main captain Emre Belözoğlu, and has scored 22 international goals in 80 appearances to date. Tuncay scored two international hat-tricks for Turkey during his international career. His first came against Switzerland in the 2006 World Cup qualifying play-off match. The game ended 4–2, however the Swiss advanced due to the away goals rule, and meant Turkey would not play in the finals of the 2006 World Cup. His second international hattrick came in November 2008 in a friendly with Austria.

==== Confederations Cup 2003 ====
Turkey took part in the FIFA Confederations Cup for the first time in 2003 after finishing third at the World Cup the previous year. Tuncay made his full international debut for the Turkey national team on 19 June 2003, having been promoted the day before when he scored twice in a match for the Under-21 side. His debut came against the United States. Just three minutes after the opponents had taken the lead, he won a penalty after being fouled by Danny Califf and Frankie Hejduk, and Okan Yılmaz converted it to equalise. Tuncay then went on to score the winner in the second half, after picking up Volkan Arslan's cross to slot the ball past the American goalkeeper Tim Howard. He went on to score three goals and get an assist which won him the Silver Shoe Award and the Silver Ball Award, for the second best player, at the competition. Turkey finished in third place. He won many plaudits during the competition, with The Daily Telegraph claiming that Turkey "have unearthed a gem". Tuncay, along with Argentina's Gabriel Batistuta, currently holds the record for scoring the quickest goal in the history of the Confederations Cup for scoring within 120 seconds.

==== Euro 2008 ====
During the qualifying rounds of the tournament, Tuncay played eleven games, scoring three goals. He won his 50th international cap on 21 November 2007 in the final qualification game against Bosnia-Herzegovina. Turkey won 1–0 which secured a place in the finals of Euro 2008 the following summer. Tuncay played a major part in Turkey's progression to the semi-finals in Austria and Switzerland, as Turkey came from behind to win three games and earn the title "Comeback Kings". In the final group-stage game of Euro 2008, against the Czech Republic, Tuncay went in goal to play as a goalkeeper for the final few minutes, after starting goalkeeper Volkan Demirel was sent off for a push on Jan Koller, and Turkey having made all their substitutions. He picked up a second yellow card in the quarter-finals against Croatia which meant that he was suspended for the semi-finals against Germany. Drawing 2–2 until the 90th minute, having just scored minutes earlier to bring the score level, Turkey were undone by a German team who themselves had to come from behind to win the game. Tuncay registered two assists, in his four games during the 2008 European Championships finals.

==== 2010 World Cup Qualifying ====
After a World Cup qualifier on 6 September 2008 between Armenia and Turkey, two sides which have historical political problems, both teams received a FIFA Fair Play Award for 2008. As captain of the side, Tuncay collected the award on behalf of the team in January 2009. During the qualifying round Tuncay managed three goals and two assists in the seven games he played, although Turkey failed to qualify from Group 5.

== Style of play ==
He is most suited to playing in the 'hole' or as a second striker, but can also play right across the midfield and in attack.

== Career statistics ==
=== Club ===
Appearances and goals by club, season and competition
Club	Season	League			National cup		League cup		Continental		Total	
Club	Season	Division	Apps	Goals	Apps	Goals	Apps	Goals	Apps	Goals	Apps	Goals
Sakaryaspor	2000–01	TFF First League	31	16	0	0	—		—		31	16
Sakaryaspor	2001–02	TFF First League	35	16	2	1	—		—		37	17
Sakaryaspor	Total		66	32	2	1	—		—		68	33
Fenerbahçe	2002–03	Süper Lig	29	9	1	0	—		1	1	31	10
Fenerbahçe	2003–04	Süper Lig	31	19	4	3	—		0	0	35	22
Fenerbahçe	2004–05	Süper Lig	31	7	5	1	—		8	5	44	13
Fenerbahçe	2005–06	Süper Lig	30	15	8	1	—		5	0	43	16
Fenerbahçe	2006–07	Süper Lig	33	9	6	1	—		12	6	51	16
Fenerbahçe	Total		154	59	24	6	—		26	12	204	77
Middlesbrough	2007–08	Premier League	34	8	3	0	1	0	—		38	8
Middlesbrough	2008–09	Premier League	33	7	4	1	0	0	—		37	8
Middlesbrough	2009–10	Championship	3	2	0	0	0	0	—		3	2
Middlesbrough	Total		70	17	7	1	1	0	—		78	18
Stoke City	2009–10	Premier League	30	4	5	1	2	0	—		37	5
Stoke City	2010–11	Premier League	14	1	1	1	3	1	—		18	3
Stoke City	Total		44	5	6	2	5	1	—		55	8
VfL Wolfsburg	2010–11	Bundesliga	4	0	—		—		—		4	0
VfL Wolfsburg	2011–12	Bundesliga	0	0	1	0	—		—		1	0
VfL Wolfsburg	Total		4	0	1	0	—		—		5	0
Bolton Wanderers (loan)	2011–12	Premier League	16	0	4	0	2	1	—		22	1
Bursaspor	2012–13	Süper Lig	27	1	4	0	—		—		31	1
Bursaspor	2013–14	Süper Lig	12	0	2	0	—		2	0	16	0
Bursaspor	Total		39	1	6	0	—		2	0	47	1
Umm Salal	2014–15	Qatar Stars League	26	11	0	0	—		—		26	11
Pune City	2015	Indian Super League	10	3	—		—		—		10	3
Career total			429	128	50	10	8	2	28	12	515	152

=== International ===
Appearances and goals by national team and year
National team	Year	Apps	Goals
Turkey	2002	1	0
Turkey	2003	10	3
Turkey	2004	12	0
Turkey	2005	5	6
Turkey	2006	9	3
Turkey	2007	12	1
Turkey	2008	12	6
Turkey	2009	10	3
Turkey	2010	8	0
Total		80	22

Scores and results list Turkey's goal tally first, score column indicates score after each Tuncay goal

List of international goals scored by Tuncay Şanlı
No.	Date	Venue	Opponent	Score	Result	Competition
1	19 June 2003	Saint-Étienne, France	United States	2–1	2–1	2003 FIFA Confederations Cup
2	26 June 2003	Paris, France	France	2–3	2–3	2003 FIFA Confederations Cup
3	28 June 2003	Saint-Étienne, France	Colombia	1–0	2–1	2003 FIFA Confederations Cup
4	30 March 2005	Tbilisi, Georgia	Georgia	5–2	5–2	2006 FIFA World Cup qualification
5	8 June 2005	Almaty, Kazakhstan	Kazakhstan	4–0	6–0	2006 FIFA World Cup qualification
6	8 June 2005	Almaty, Kazakhstan	Kazakhstan	5–0	6–0	2006 FIFA World Cup qualification
7	16 November 2005	Istanbul, Turkey	Switzerland	1–1	4–2	2006 FIFA World Cup playoffs
8	16 November 2005	Istanbul, Turkey	Switzerland	2–1	4–2	2006 FIFA World Cup playoffs
9	16 November 2005	Istanbul, Turkey	Switzerland	4–2	4–2	2006 FIFA World Cup playoffs
10	24 May 2006	Genk, Belgium	Belgium	3–2	3–3	Friendly
11	7 October 2006	Budapest, Hungary	Hungary	1–0	1–0	UEFA Euro 2008 qualifying
12	11 October 2006	Frankfurt, Germany	Moldova	5–0	5–0	UEFA Euro 2008 qualifying
13	24 March 2007	Piraeus, Greece	Greece	1–1	4–1	UEFA Euro 2008 qualifying
14	26 March 2008	Minsk, Belarus	Belarus	1–1	2–2	Friendly
15	29 May 2008	Duisburg, Germany	Finland	1–0	2–0	Friendly
16	6 September 2008	Yerevan, Armenia	Armenia	1–0	2–0	2010 FIFA World Cup qualification
17	19 November 2008	Vienna, Austria	Austria	2–1	4–2	Friendly
18	19 November 2008	Vienna, Austria	Austria	3–1	4–2	Friendly
19	19 November 2008	Vienna, Austria	Austria	4–2	4–2	Friendly
20	12 August 2009	Kyiv, Ukraine	Ukraine	1–0	3–0	Friendly
21	5 September 2009	Kayseri, Turkey	Estonia	1–1	4–2	2010 FIFA World Cup qualification
22	5 September 2009	Kayseri, Turkey	Estonia	4–2	4–2	2010 FIFA World Cup qualification

== Managerial statistics ==
As of 9 February 2017

Team	Nat.	From	To	Record							
Team	Nat.	From	To	G	W	D	L	GF	GA	GD	Win %
Sakaryaspor	(Turkey)	26 October 2016	7 February 2017	13	6	4	3	18	16	+2	46.15
Total				13	6	4	3	18	16	+2	46.15

== Honours ==
Fenerbahçe

- Süper Lig: 2003–04, 2004–05, 2006–07

Turkey

- UEFA European Championship bronze medalist:2008
- 2003 FIFA Confederations Cup bronze medalist

Individual

- FIFA Confederations Cup Silver Ball: 2003
- FIFA Confederations Cup Silver Shoe: 2003
- Fenerbahçe Player of the Year: 2005–06, 2006–07
- Middlesbrough F.C. Players Player of the Year: 2008–09
- Garmin Player of the Year: 2008–09
- Middlesbrough F.C. Official Supporters' Club Prize: 2008–09
- Middlesbrough Terrace Legends Award: 2008–09
- Middlesbrough F.C. top scorer: 2008–09
- BBC Goal of the Month Award: December 2007, May 2009
- North East Player of the Year: Third Place (2009)
