= 1999–2000 Mersin İdmanyurdu season =

Mersin İdmanyurdu
1999–2000 season
- President: Macit Özcan (since 19 April 1999)
- Head coach: Ali Gültiken (till 9 September 1999); Müjdat Yalman (till 13 March 2000)
- Stadium: Tevfik Sırrı Gür Stadium; Mersin, Turkey
- Second League: Ranking Group 1: 7th Classification Group 1: 5th
- Turkish Cup: Eliminated at R3
- Top goalscorer: League: Ersan Parlatan (6); All: Ersan Parlatan (6)
| Home colours | Away colours | Third colours |

Mersin İdmanyurdu (also Mersin İdman Yurdu, Mersin İY, or MİY) Sports Club; located in Mersin, east Mediterranean coast of Turkey in 1999–2000. Mersin İdmanyurdu (MİY) participated in Second League 1999–00 season for the 26th time. MİY could not attend promotion group and promotion play-offs, therefore couldn't promote. The team also participated in Turkish Cup in 1999–00 and eliminated at Round 3.

Macit Özcan was club president. Ali Gültiken started the season, which was his first head coaching experience. Later Müjdat Yalman took over the team. Murat Akay had the most appearances, while Ersan Parlatan was top goalscorer. The stats are low this season due to the withdrawal of teams who were severely affected by the 1999 İzmit earthquake.

== 1999–2000 Second League participation ==
Mersin İdmanyurdu took place in Group 1 in 1999–2000 Second League season. League was played in three stages. In the first stage, 50 teams in five groups (10 clubs in each) played for the first two rankings to play in the promotion group. The promotion group consisted of those 10 teams. At the end of the second stage top two teams promoted to 2000–01 First League. The remaining 8 teams in each ranking group played in classification groups, by carrying points and goals from ranking groups. Bottom two teams in Groups 2, 4, 5 relegated to 2000–01 Third League at the end of the season. Due to the earthquake that occurred on 17 August 1999, Sakaryaspor and Düzcespor in Group 1 and Darıca Gençlerbirliği in Group 3 withdrew from the league and demanded excuse. TFF has decided that the teams would not be relegated. One another worst team from Group 1 and two other worst teams in Group 3 had relegated at the end of the season. In the third stage, 8 clubs (3 from the promotion group and 1 each from 5 classification groups) played one-leg play-off games in Antalya Atatürk Stadium to determine the third team to be promoted to First League.

Mersin İdmanyurdu took place in Group 1 consisted of 10 teams and finished the first stage at 7th place and couldn't take a place in the promotion group. In the classification group, the team finished 4th and could not attend to promotion play-off games.

=== Results summary ===
Mersin İdmanyurdu (MİY) 1999–2000 Second League season league summary:

| | Overall | | | | | | | | | Home | | | | | | | | Away | | | | | | | |
| Stage | Pc | Pl | W | D | L | GF | GA | GD | Pt | Pl | W | D | L | GF | GA | GD | Pt | Pl | W | D | L | GF | GA | GD | Pt |
|---|---|---|---|---|---|---|---|---|---|---|---|---|---|---|---|---|---|---|---|---|---|---|---|---|---|
| Ranking Group | 7 | 18 | 6 | 7 | 5 | 20 | 16 | +4 | 25 | 9 | 3 | 4 | 2 | 10 | 7 | +3 | 13 | 9 | 3 | 3 | 3 | 10 | 9 | +1 | 12 |
| Classification Group | 4 | 14 | 7 | 3 | 4 | 22 | 11 | +11 | 24 | 7 | 5 | 0 | 2 | 11 | 3 | +8 | 15 | 7 | 2 | 3 | 2 | 11 | 8 | +3 | 9 |
| Overall | 5 | 32 | 13 | 10 | 9 | 42 | 27 | +15 | 49 | 16 | 8 | 4 | 4 | 21 | 10 | +11 | 28 | 16 | 5 | 6 | 5 | 21 | 17 | +4 | 21 |

Sources: 1999–2000 Turkish Second Football League pages.

=== Ranking group league table ===
Mersin İY's league performance in 1999–2000 Second League Ranking Group 1 season is shown in the following table.

| Pc | Team | Games | | | | Goals | | Pts | Home | | | Away | | |
| Pc | Team | Pl | W | D | L | F | A | Pts | F–A | R | Pc | F–A | R | Pc |
|---|---|---|---|---|---|---|---|---|---|---|---|---|---|---|
| 1 | Sarıyer (Q) | 18 | 11 | 6 | 1 | 40 | 12 | 39 | 1–1 | 10 | 8 | 0–3 | 1 | 10 |
| 2 | Kombassan Konyaspor (Q) | 18 | 12 | 3 | 3 | 34 | 10 | 39 | 1–0 | 17 | 8 | 0–2 | 8 | 8 |
| 3 | Gaziantep Büyükşehir Belediyespor | 18 | 7 | 9 | 2 | 29 | 15 | 30 | 1–1 | 3 | 8 | 1–1 | 12 | 8 |
| 4 | İstanbul Büyükşehir Belediyespor | 18 | 8 | 6 | 4 | 25 | 18 | 30 | 0–1 | 5 | 8 | 1–2 | 14 | 8 |
| 5 | Hatayspor | 18 | 6 | 8 | 4 | 26 | 18 | 26 | 0–0 | 9 | 8 | 2–1 | 18 | 7 |
| 6 | Zeytinburnuspor | 18 | 7 | 5 | 6 | 24 | 19 | 26 | 0–0 | 15 | 8 | 0–0 | 6 | 8 |
| 7 | Mersin İdmanyurdu | 18 | 6 | 7 | 5 | 26 | 16 | 25 | | | | | | |
| 8 | Bakırköyspor | 18 | 5 | 7 | 6 | 23 | 22 | 22 | 1–4 | 2 | 10 | 0–0 | 11 | 8 |
| 9 | Sakaryaspor | 18 | 1 | 1 | 16 | 4 | 49 | 4 | 3–0 | 13 | 8 | 3–0 | 4 | 7 |
| 10 | Düzcespor | 18 | 1 | 0 | 17 | 3 | 49 | 3 | 3–0 | 7 | 8 | 3–0 | 16 | 8 |

Three points for a win. Rules for classification: 1) points; 2) tie-break; 3) goal difference; 4) number of goals scored. In the score columns first scores belong to MİY.
(Q): Qualified to 1999–2000 Second League Promotion Group.
Source: 1999–2000 Turkish Second Football League pages from TFF website, Turkish-Soccer website, and Maçkolik website.

=== Ranking group games ===
Mersin İdmanyurdu (MİY) 1999–2000 Second League season first half game reports in Ranking Group 1 is shown in the following table. Kick off times are in EET and EEST.

| 15 August 1999 Round 1 | Sarıyer | 3–0 | Mersin İdmanyurdu | Y.Z. Öniş Stadium, Sarıyer, Istanbul |
| Sunday, 17:00 | Bülent Öztürk 50' (F); Mehmet Gökhan Terci 78' (F); Sadettin Demirtaş 87' (F); Murat Yaman (yellow card) 43'; Serkan Özdemir (yellow card) 70'; Mehmet Gökhan Terci (yellow card) 74' | Report | | Referee: İbrahim Çınar |

| 12 September 1999 Round 2 | Mersin İdmanyurdu | 1–4 | Bakırköyspor | Tevfik Sırrı Gür Stadium, Mersin |
| Sunday, 16:00 | İsmet Keser 70' (pen.); Yalçın Günay (yellow card) 37'; İsmet Keser (yellow card) 58'; Abdussamet Yiğit (yellow card) 65'; Önal Arıca (yellow card) 82'; Köksal Ferizcan (yellow card) 89' | Report | 5' (F) Tuncay Meriç; 14' (F) Ramazan Konya; 41' (F) Erkan Aydın; 81' (F) Mahmut Taşdemir; (yellow card) 20' Gürol Çevik | Referee: Satılmış Kavacıklı |

| 19 September 1999 Round 3 | Mersin İdmanyurdu | 1–1 | Gaziantep BŞB | Tevfik Sırrı Gür Stadium, Mersin |
| Sunday, 16:00 | İsmet Keser 63' (pen.); Yalçın Günay (yellow card) 23'; Abdussamet Yiğit (red card) 48'; Önal Arıca (yellow card) 60'; Ahmet Kolcu (yellow card) 71' | Report | 7' (F) Mustafa Şefik Canbülbül; (yellow card) 41' Mehmet Vertop; (yellow card) 65' Musa Kahraman | Referee: Cafer Kuştepe |

| 26 September 1999 Round 4 | Sakaryaspor | 0–3 | Mersin İdmanyurdu |
| | | Report (Awarded Score) |

| 3 October 1999 Round 5 | Mersin İdmanyurdu | 0–1 | İstanbul BŞB | Tevfik Sırrı Gür Stadium, Mersin |
| Sunday, 15:00 | Yunus Emre Ülker (yellow card) 20'; Bora Çebi (red card) 20'; Durmuş Tozlu (yellow card) 27' | Report | 83' (F) Uçar; (yellow card) 39' Fevzi Korkmaz | Referee: Habeşi Bilal Kutlu |

| 10 October 1999 Round 6 | Zeytinburnuspor | 0–0 | Mersin İdmanyurdu | Z.burnu Stadium, Z.burnu, Istanbul |
| Sunday, 15:30 | Bülent Zafer Karagöz (yellow card) 10'; Ali Çakır (yellow card) 80'; Cengiz Erkol (yellow card) 80'; Şafak Burak Bayman (yellow card) 56' | Report | (yellow card) 10' Şenol Erol | Referee: Ufuk Tayfun Öcal |

| 17 October 1999 Round 7 | Mersin İdmanyurdu | 3–0 | Düzcespor |
| | | Report (Awarded Score) |

| 24 October 1999 Round 8 | Kombassan Konyaspor | 2–0 | Mersin İdmanyurdu | Atatürk Stadium, Konya |
| Sunday, 19:00 | İhsan Burak Özsaraç 6' (F); Semavi Uzun 67' (F); Hayri Yılmaz (yellow card) 64' | Report | (yellow card) 52' Yunus Emre Ülker | Referee: Bülent Akkaşlı |

| 31 October 1999 Round 9 | Mersin İdmanyurdu | 0–0 | Hatayspor | Tevfik Sırrı Gür Stadium, Mersin |
| Sunday, 13:30 | Serkan Özbalta (yellow card) 32'; Murat Akay (yellow card) 60'; Erdal Tanhan (red card) 62' | Report | (red card) 27' Hakan Özyay; (yellow card) 87' Ekrem Ekşioğlu | Referee: Ferhat Gündoğdu |

| 7 November 1999 Round 10 | Mersin İdmanyurdu | 1–1 | Sarıyer | Tevfik Sırrı Gür Stadium, Mersin |
| Sunday, 13:30 | Önal Arıca 12' (F); Önal Arıca (yellow card) 25'; Abdussamet Yiğit (red card) 51'; Gökhan Kolomoç (red card) 63'; Bülent Kapıcı (red card) 70'; İsmet Keser (yellow card) 88' | Report | 49' (pen.) Serkan Özdemir; (yellow card) 12' Salih Karalar; (yellow card) 17' Hakan Çimen; (yellow card) 43' Ender Özinç; (yellow card) 45' Fevzi Açıkgöz; (yellow card) 78' Ünal Bulut | Referee: Kenan Yusuf Gökkaya |

| 14 November 1999 Round 11 | Bakırköyspor | 0–0 | Mersin İdmanyurdu | Şenlikköy Stadium, Bakırköy, Istanbul |
| Sunday, 14:00 | Ramazan Konya (red card) 20'; Mehmet Akif Ekmekçi (yellow card) 24'; Gürol Çevik (yellow card) 27'; Faruk Özbekir (yellow card) 80'; Erdal Karakış (yellow card) 89' | Report | (yellow card) 33' Murat Akay | Referee: Ünsal Çimen |

| 21 November 1999 Round 12 | Gaziantep BŞB | 1–1 | Mersin İdmanyurdu | Kamil Ocak Stadium, Gaziantep |
| Sunday, 13:30 | Mehmet Akdemir 65' (F); Mustafa Marangoz (yellow card) 40'; Kemal Aslan (yellow card) 43'; Ahmet Bilgi (yellow card) 51' | Report | 42' (F) Ersan Parlatan; (yellow card) 22' Yunus Emre Ülker; (yellow card) 60' Abdussamet Yiğit; (yellow card) 65' Önal Arıca; (yellow card) 65' Şenol Erol; (yellow card) 68' Erdal Tanhan | Referee: Bedri Mutaf |

| 28 November 1999 Round 13 | Mersin İdmanyurdu | 3–0 | Sakaryaspor |
| | | Report (Awarded Score) |

| 5 December 1999 Round 14 | İstanbul BŞB | 2–1 | Mersin İdmanyurdu | GOP Stadium, G.o.paşa, Istanbul |
| Sunday, 14:00 | Fevzi Korkmaz 76' (F); Ahmet Pişkin 90+2' (F); Ercan Ağaçe (yellow card) 65' | Report | 88' (F) Zeynel Abidin Oktay; (yellow card) 61' Gökhan Kolomoç | Referee: Turgay Duman |

| 12 December 1999 Round 15 | Mersin İdmanyurdu | 0–0 | Zeytinburnuspor | Tevfik Sırrı Gür Stadium, Mersin |
| Sunday, 13:30 | Erdal Tanhan (yellow card) 18'; Bülent Kapıcı (yellow card) 65' | Report | (yellow card) 4' Barış Korkmaz; (yellow card) 6' Fikret Durak; (yellow card) 31' Metin Akçiçek; (yellow card) 76' Levent Kayatekin; (yellow card) 81' Bülent Şentürk | Referee: Ziya Fidan |

| 19 December 1999 Round 16 | Düzcespor | 0–3 | Mersin İdmanyurdu |
| | | Report (Awarded Score) |

| 25 December 1999 Round 17 | Mersin İdmanyurdu | 1–0 | Kombassan Konyaspor | Tevfik Sırrı Gür Stadium, Mersin |
| Saturday, 13:30 | Ersan Parlatan 31' (F); Erdal Tanhan (yellow card) 67'; Oğuzhan Doğar (yellow card) 70'; Ersan Parlatan (yellow card) 89' | Report | (yellow card) 14' Cüneyt Yis; (yellow card) 23' Bülent Bölükbaşı; (yellow card) 31' Hayri Yılmaz; (yellow card) 80' Ayhan Şirin | Referee: Fırat Kızıl |

| 29 December 1999 Round 18 | Hatayspor | 1–2 | Mersin İdmanyurdu | Atatürk Stadium, Antakya, Hatay |
| Wednesday, 13:30 | Göksel Akıncı 15' (F) | Report | 37' (F) Ersan Parlatan; 78' (F) Ragıp Başdağ; (yellow card) 44' Önal Arıca; (yellow card) 49' Abdussamet Yiğit; (yellow card) 89' Gökhan Sakar | Referee: Kuddusi Müftüoğlu |

Sources: 1999–2000 Turkish Second Football League pages.

=== Classification group league table ===
Classification group 1 was played with 8 teams remaining after top two of ranking group were promoted to promotion group. Top team in the group promoted to promotion play-offs, while bottom two teams relegated to 1999–2000 Third League season. Points and goals were carried from ranking group. MİY obtained 7 wins, 3 draws and 4 losses and finished fourth. However, because points and goals were carried from ranking group, in aggregate MİY finished fifth and did not play promotion play-offs. Mersin İY's league performance in Second League Classification Group 1 in 1999–2000 season is shown in the following table.

| Pc | Team | Games | | | | Goals | | Pts | Home | | | Away | | |
| Pc | Team | Pl | W | D | L | F | A | Pts | F–A | R | Pc | F–A | R | Pc |
|---|---|---|---|---|---|---|---|---|---|---|---|---|---|---|
| 1 | Gaziantep Büyükşehir Belediyespor (Q) | 32 | 16 | 13 | 3 | 58 | 26 | 61 | 0–1 | 4 | 6 | 2–2 | 11 | 5 |
| 2 | İstanbul Büyükşehir Belediyespor | 32 | 15 | 9 | 8 | 47 | 32 | 54 | 1–0 | 13 | 4 | 0–0 | 6 | 6 |
| 3 | Hatayspor | 32 | 14 | 10 | 8 | 53 | 34 | 52 | 0–1 | 2 | 6 | 1–1 | 9 | 5 |
| 4 | Bakırköyspor | 32 | 14 | 8 | 10 | 48 | 37 | 50 | 2–0 | 8 | 4 | 3–2 | 1 | 5 |
| 5 | Mersin İdmanyurdu | 32 | 13 | 10 | 9 | 42 | 27 | 49 | | | | | | |
| 6 | Zeytinburnuspor (R) | 32 | 14 | 6 | 12 | 50 | 31 | 48 | 2–1 | 7 | 6 | 2–0 | 14 | 5 |
| 7 | Sakaryaspor | 1 | 0 | 1 | 0 | 1 | 1 | 1 | 3–0 | 5 | 6 | 3–0 | 12 | 4 |
| 8 | Düzcespor | 1 | 0 | 0 | 1 | 0 | 1 | 0 | 3–0 | 10 | 5 | 3–0 | 3 | 6 |

Three points for a win. Rules for classification: 1) points; 2) tie-break; 3) goal difference; 4) number of goals scored. In the score columns first scores belong to MİY.
(Q): Qualified to 1999–2000 Promotion Play-offs; (R): Relegated to 2000–01 Turkish Third Football League.
Source: 1999–2000 Turkish Second Football League pages from TFF website, Turkish-Soccer website, and Maçkolik website.

=== Classification group games ===
Mersin İdmanyurdu (MİY) 1999–2000 Second League season first half game reports in Classification Group 1 is shown in the following table. Kick off times are in EET and EEST.

| 20 February 2000 Round 1 | Bakırköyspor | 3–2 | Mersin İdmanyurdu | Şenlikköy Stadium, Bakırköy, Istanbul |
| Sunday, 13:30 | Mehmet Aksu 20' (F); Mahmut Taşdemir 44' (F); Atnan Baytar 53' (pen.); Gökhan Sert (yellow card) 14'; Emre Şevki Dirikan (yellow card) 27'; Mahmut Taşdemir (yellow card) 44'; Mustafa Katip (yellow card) 82' | Report | 42' (F) Ersan Parlatan; 45' (F) Tanser Aydın; (red card) 24' Erdal Tanhan; (yellow card) 36' Bülent Tarık Kapıcı; (yellow card) 41' Gökhan Kolomoç; (yellow card) 43' Ersan Parlatan; (red card) 53' Tanser Aydın | Referee: Ömer Soysal |

| 27 February 2000 Round 2 | Mersin İdmanyurdu | 0–1 | Hatayspor | Tevfik Sırrı Gür Stadium, Mersin |
| Sunday, 13:30 | Yunus Emre Ülker (yellow card) 60'; Önal Arıca (yellow card) 62' | Report | 23' (F) Serdar Akçay; (yellow card) 27' Hakan Özyay; (yellow card) 89' Ekrem Ekşioğlu | Referee: Hasan Yapıcı |

| 5 March 2000 Round 3 | Düzcespor | 0–3 | Mersin İdmanyurdu |
| | | Report (Awarded Score) |

| 12 March 2000 Round 4 | Mersin İdmanyurdu | 0–1 | Gaziantep BŞB | Tevfik Sırrı Gür Stadium, Mersin |
| Sunday, 13:30 | Gökhan Sakar (yellow card) 28'; İsmet Keser (yellow card) 34'; Gökhan Kolomoç (yellow card) 84' | Report | 89' (F) Seydi Çil; (yellow card) 75' Ahmet Bilgi; (yellow card) 89' Şakir Can | Referee: Kadir Özdemir |

| 19 March 2000 Round 5 | Mersin İdmanyurdu | 3–0 | Sakaryaspor |
| | | Report (Awarded Score) |

| 26 March 2000 Round 6 | İstanbul BŞB | 0–0 | Mersin İdmanyurdu | GOP Stadium, G.o.paşa, Istanbul |
| Sunday, 14:30 | Fevzi Korkmaz (yellow card) 18' | Report | (yellow card) 30' Abdussamet Yiğit | Referee: Yavuz Şahin |

| 2 April 2000 Round 7 | Mersin İdmanyurdu | 2–1 | Zeytinburnuspor | Tevfik Sırrı Gür Stadium, Mersin |
| Sunday, 14:30 | Ali Kemal Er 38' (F); Tanser Aydın 80' (F); Bora Çebi (yellow card) 25'; Bülent Kapıcı (yellow card) 61'; Gökhan Sakar (yellow card) 66'; Erdal Tanhan (red card) 89'; Önal Arıca (red card) 89' | Report | 89' (F) Şafak Burak Bayman; (yellow card) 9' Kamil Ustaömer; (yellow card) 71' Gürol Çevik; (red card) 89' Şafak Burak Bayman; (red card) 89' Zekir Keskin | Referee: Faruk Saçar |

| 9 April 2000 Round 8 | Mersin İdmanyurdu | 2–0 | Bakırköyspor | Tevfik Sırrı Gür Stadium, Mersin |
| Sunday, 14:30 | Ersan Parlatan 33' (pen.); Tanser Aydın 90' (F); Bülent Kapıcı (yellow card) 58'; Ersan Parlatan (yellow card) 71'; Gökhan Kolomoç (yellow card) 79' | Report | (yellow card) 33' Mehmet Akif Ekmekçi; (yellow card) 852' Orkun Uşak | Referee: Reha Biçici |

| 16 April 2000 Round 9 | Hatayspor | 1–1 | Mersin İdmanyurdu | Atatürk Stadium, Antakya, Hatay |
| Sunday, 14:30 | Ali Gürsoy 6' (F); Ahmet Çalışır (yellow card) 22' | Report | 9' (F) Gökhan Sakar | Referee: Namık Orhan |

| 23 April 2000 Round 10 | Mersin İdmanyurdu | 3–0 | Düzcespor |
| | | Report (Awarded Score) |

| 30 April 2000 Round 11 | Gaziantep BŞB | 2–2 | Mersin İdmanyurdu | Kamil Ocak Stadium, Gaziantep |
| Sunday, 15:30 | Cemal Dilek 23' (F); Oral Küçükoral 67' (F); Cemal Dilek (yellow card) 32'; Sedat Kara (yellow card) 32' | Report | 19' (F) Ersan Parlatan; 37' (pen.) Tanser Aydın; (yellow card) 38' Gökhan Sakar | Referee: Harun Yiğit |

| 7 May 2000 Round 12 | Sakaryaspor | 0–3 | Mersin İdmanyurdu |
| | | Report (Awarded Score) |

| 14 May 2000 Round 13 | Mersin İdmanyurdu | 1–0 | İstanbul BŞB | Tevfik Sırrı Gür Stadium, Mersin |
| Sunday, 15:30 | Tanser Aydın 25' (pen.); Abdussamet Yiğit (yellow card) 87'; Oğuzhan Doğar (yellow card) 88'; İsmet Keser (yellow card) 89' | Report | (yellow card) 49' Erkan Ergün; (yellow card) 88' Ender Traş | Referee: Numan Polat |

| 21 May 2000 Round 14 | Zeytinburnuspor | 2–0 | Mersin İdmanyurdu | Z.burnu Stadium, Z.burnu, Istanbul |
| Sunday, 15:30 | Şafak Burak Bayman 8' (F); Şafak Burak Bayman 78' (F); Ziyaattin Gündoğdu (yellow card) 56' | Report | (yellow card) 35' Ragıp Başdağ; (red card) 41' Ersan Parlatan; (yellow card) 71' Serkan Özbalta | Referee: Ferhat Gündoğdu |

Sources: 1999–2000 Turkish Second Football League pages.

== 1999–2000 Turkish Cup participation ==
1999–2000 Turkish Cup was played by 64 teams in 4 rounds prior to quarterfinals in one-leg elimination system. [Mersin İdmanyurdu] had participated in 38th Turkish Cup (played as Türkiye Kupası in 1999–00) from Round 1 and eliminated at Round 2. The opponents in first round were 3rd League team Ceyhanspor. In Round 2, 2nd League team BB Ankaraspor eliminated MİY. Galatasaray won the cup for the 13th time.

=== Cup track ===
The drawings and results Mersin İdmanyurdu (MİY) followed in 1999–00 Turkish Cup are shown in the following table.

| Round | Own League | Opponent's League | Opponent | A/H | Score | Result |
|---|---|---|---|---|---|---|
| Round 1 | Second League | Third League | Ceyhanspor | A | 1–0 | Promoted to R3 |
| Round 2 | Second League | Second League | Büyükşehir Belediye Ankaraspor | A | 2–3 | Eliminated |

Note: In the above table 'Score' shows For and Against goals whether the match played at home or not.

=== Game details ===
Mersin İdmanyurdu (MİY) 1999–00 Turkish Cup game reports is shown in the following table. Kick off times are in EET and EEST.

| 27 October 1999 Round 1 | Ceyhanspor | 0–1 | Mersin İdmanyurdu | Ceyhan City Stadium, Ceyhan, Adana |
| Wednesday, 14:00 | Serkan Özbalta (yellow card) 66' | Report | 16' (F) Zeynel Abidin Oktay; (yellow card) 36' Ahmet Cingöz; (yellow card) 67' Serdal Çelik; (yellow card) 80' Hasan Turgutalp | Referee: İlhan Pancar |

| 10 November 1999 Round 2 | BŞB Ankaraspor | 3–2 | Mersin İdmanyurdu | Aktepe Stadium, Ankara |
| Wednesday, 13:00 | Sunay Kahraman 7' (F); Mustafa Polat 42' (F); Temel Altuntaş 62' (pen.); Osman Çakır (yellow card) 11' | Report | 11' (pen.) İsmet Keser; 62' (F) Eren Erhan Şaş; (yellow card) 62' Ali Özyar | Referee: Hakan Özkan |

Source: 1999–2000 Turkish Cup pages.

== Management ==
=== Club management ===
Macit Özcan, mayor of Mersin city was president. Özcan elected president in club congress after 18 April 1999 local elections. Mayors presided the club many times in its history.

=== Coaching team ===
Ali Gültiken was head coach at the start of the season. After 4th round Müjdat Yalman, who coached team in previous season came to the position.

1999–2000 Mersin İdmanyurdu head coaches:

| Nat | Head coach | Period | Pl | W | D | L | Notes |
|---|---|---|---|---|---|---|---|
| (Turkey) | Ali Gültiken | 01.07.1999 – 09.09.1999 | 1 | 0 | 0 | 1 | Left after 1st round of the first stage. |
| | | 10.09.1999 – 29.09.1999 | 3 | 1 | 1 | 1 | |
| (Turkey) | Müjdat Yalman | 30.09.1999 – 13.03.2000 | 20 | 7 | 6 | 7 | Left after 4th round of the second stage. |
| | | 14.03.2000 – 31.05.2000 | 10 | 6 | 3 | 1 | |

Note: Only official games were included. 8 of the wins were awarded. See above tables within date ranges.

== 1999–2000 squad ==
Appearances, goals and cards count for 1999–00 Second League Ranking and Classification Groups games and 1999–00 Turkish Cup games. 18 players appeared in each game roster, three to be replaced. Only the players who appeared in game rosters were included and listed in order of appearance.

| O | N | Nat | Name | Birth | Born | Pos | LA | LG | CA | CG | TA | TG | Booked | Sent off (straight red) | ← Season Notes → |
|---|---|---|---|---|---|---|---|---|---|---|---|---|---|---|---|
| 1 | 1 | (Turkey) | Bekir Arpacı | 2 Apr 1975 | Hatay | GK | 2 | | 2 | | 4 | | | | → previous season. |
| 2 | 2 | (Turkey) | Önal Arıca | 23 Feb 1976 | Mersin | DF | 20 | 1 | | | 20 | 1 | 6 | 1 | → previous season. |
| 3 | 3 | (Turkey) | Murat Şaş | 19 May 1977 | Gaziantep | DF | 3 | | | | 3 | | | | → previous season. |
| 4 | 4 | (Turkey) | Murat Akay | 19 Jul 1976 | Mersin | DF | 23 | | 2 | | 25 | | 2 | | → previous season. |
| 5 | 5 | (Turkey) | Köksal Ferizcan | 13 Oct 1968 | Ankara | MF | 13 | | 2 | | 15 | | 1 | | → previous season. |
| 6 | 6 | (Turkey) | Sercan Yüksekdağ | 9 Sep 1981 | Mersin | DF | 2 | | 1 | | 3 | | | | First time professional. |
| 7 | 7 | (Turkey) | Ünal Bulut | 3 Jan 1975 | Konya | DF | 1 | | | | 1 | | | | → previous season. |
| 8 | 8 | (Turkey) | Bülent Kapıcı | 29 Aug 1973 | Istanbul | MF | 20 | | | | 20 | | 4 | 1 | → previous season. |
| 9 | 9 | (Turkey) | İsmet Keser | 5 Jan 1974 | Mersin | MF | 17 | 2 | 2 | 1 | 19 | 3 | 4 | | → previous season. |
| 10 | 10 | (Turkey) | Ahmet Kolcu | 1 Jan 1983 | Mazgirt | FW | 4 | | 2 | | 6 | | 1 | | Amateur player. |
| 11 | 11 | (Turkey) | Nurullah Saygılı | 10 Nov 1976 | Kiğı | FW | 3 | | | | 3 | | | | → previous season. |
| 12 | 12 | (Turkey) | Hakan Baygın | 14 Aug 1969 | Mersin | GK | | | | | | | | | → previous season. |
| 13 | 13 | (Turkey) | Yalçın Günay | 2 Jun 1974 | Bayburt | MF | 2 | | 1 | | 3 | | 2 | | → previous season. |
| 14 | 14 | (Turkey) | Samet Yiğit | 2 Feb 1975 | Muş | DF | 15 | | 1 | | 16 | | 5 | 2 | → previous season. |
| 15 | 15 | (Turkey) | Bora Çebi | 6 Mar 1975 | Ordu | MF | 5 | | 2 | | 7 | | 1 | 1 | → previous season. |
| 16 | 16 | (Turkey) | Turhan Aktarla | 19 Nov 1974 | Mersin | FW | 1 | | | | 1 | | | | → previous season. |
| 17 | 17 | (Turkey) | Salim Çömert | 1 Jan 1982 | Mersin | FW | | | | | | | | | Amateur player. |
| 18 | 18 | (Turkey) | Serdar Sucu | 18 Apr 1982 | Mersin | MF | | | | | | | | | Amateur player. |
| 19 | 1 | (Turkey) | Oğuzhan Doğar | 1 Jun 1978 | Osmaniye | GK | 22 | | | | 22 | | 2 | | → previous season. |
| 20 | 4 | (Turkey) | Mustafa Çevirgen | 12 Feb 1973 | Adana | DF | 4 | | 1 | | 5 | | | | → previous season. |
| 21 | 6 | (Turkey) | Ferit Kaya | 2 Jan 1975 | Afşin | MF | 17 | | 1 | | 18 | | | | → previous season. |
| 22 | 9 | (Turkey) | Abidin Oktay | 12 Aug 1976 | Mardin | FW | 13 | 1 | 2 | 1 | 15 | 2 | | | → previous season. |
| 23 | 16 | (Turkey) | Durmuş Tozlu | 19 Feb 1979 | Elbistan | DF | 1 | | | | 1 | | 1 | | → previous season. |
| 24 | 3 | (Turkey) | Ali Özyar | 2 Feb 1970 | Sivas | DF | 8 | | 1 | | 9 | | 1 | | 2000 WT Çorluspor. |
| 25 | 5 | (Turkey) | Emre Ülker | 2 Jan 1973 | Bursa | DF | 15 | | | | 15 | | 4 | | 2000 WT K. Konyaspor. |
| 26 | 7 | (Turkey) | Ersan Parlatan | 1 Aug 1977 | Berlin | MF | 21 | 6 | | | 21 | 6 | 3 | 1 | 2000 WT Gençlerbirliği. |
| 27 | 11 | (Turkey) | Şenol Erol | 10 Apr 1981 | Tarsus | FW | 10 | | 2 | | 12 | | 2 | | First time professional. |
| 28 | 18 | (Turkey) | Erhan Şaş | 9 Feb 1979 | Karataş | FW | 2 | | 1 | 1 | 3 | 1 | | | 2000 WL Ankaragücü. |
| 29 | 4 | (Turkey) | Gökhan Kolomoç | 28 May 1977 | Akçaabat | DF | 17 | | | | 17 | | 4 | 1 | 2000 WL Trabzonspor. |
| 30 | 9 | (Turkey) | Ragıp Basdağ | 9 Jun 1978 | Trabzon | MF | 17 | 1 | 1 | | 18 | 1 | 1 | | 2000 WL Trabzonspor. |
| 31 | 10 | (Turkey) | Serkan Özbalta | 5 Feb 1979 | Of | FW | 11 | | 2 | | 13 | | 3 | | 2000 WL Altay. |
| 32 | 12 | (Turkey) | Zekeriya Kuşak | 22 Aug 1976 | Eskişehir | GK | | | | | | | | | 2000 WT Y. Afyonspor. |
| 33 | 15 | (Turkey) | İsa Atalay | 1 May 1969 | Adana | FW | | | | | | | | | 2000 WT Tarsus İY. |
| 34 | 11 | (Turkey) | Erdal Tanhan | 1 Nov 1978 | Van | FW | 10 | | 1 | | 11 | | 3 | 3 | 2000 WT Gaskispor. |
| 35 | 10 | (Turkey) | Gökhan Sakar | 7 Apr 1975 | Osmaniye | FW | 11 | 1 | | | 11 | 1 | 4 | | 2000 WL İstanbulspor. |
| 36 | 11 | (Turkey) | Tanser Aydın | 20 May 1970 | Ankara | FW | 11 | 5 | | | 11 | 5 | | 1 | 2000 WT Denizlispor. |
| 37 | 18 | (Turkey) | Ali Kemal Er | 1 Jan 1978 | Iğdır | MF | 7 | 1 | | | 7 | 1 | | | First time professional. |

Sources: TFF club page and maçkolik team page.

== See also ==
- Football in Turkey
