= 1998–99 Mersin İdmanyurdu season =

Mersin İdmanyurdu
1998–99 season
- President: Mehmet Küver (till 18 April 1999); Macit Özcan (since 19 April 1999)
- Head coach: Müjdat Yalman (till 14 December 1998); Kahraman Karataş (till 31 May 1998)
- Stadium: Tevfik Sırrı Gür Stadium; Mersin, Turkey
- Second League: Ranking Group 1: 3rd Classification Group 1: 1st (Q); Promotion Play-offs: QF
- Turkish Cup: Eliminated at R2
- Top goalscorer: League: Gökhan Sakar (20); All: Gökhan Sakar (22)
Home colours	Away colours	Third colours

Mersin İdmanyurdu (also Mersin İdman Yurdu, Mersin İY, or MİY) Sports Club; located in Mersin, east Mediterranean coast of Turkey in 1998–99. Mersin İdmanyurdu (MİY) participated in 1998–99 Second League season for the 25th time. MİY couldn't attend promotion group but had finished classification in the first place and attended promotion play-offs, but couldn't promote. Team also participated in Turkish Cup in 1998–99 and eliminated at Round 2.

Mehmet Küver was club president. Müjdat Yalman managed the team in the first half. In the second half Kahraman Karataş was head coach. Oğuzhan Doğar appeared in all league games. In total Gökhan Sakar share the most appearance with 32 appearances. Gökhan Sakar was also league and season top goalscorer.

== 1998–99 Second League participation ==
Mersin İdmanyurdu took place in Group 1 in 1998–99 Second League season. League was played in three stages. In the first stage 50 teams in five groups (10 clubs in each) played for first two rankings to play in promotion group. The promotion group consisted of those 10 teams. At the end of the second stage top two teams promoted to 1999–00 First League. Remaining 8 teams in each ranking group played in classification groups, by carrying points and goals from ranking groups. Bottom two teams relegated to 1999–00 Third League at the end of the season. In the third stage, 8 clubs (3 from the promotion group and 1 each from 5 classification groups) played one-leg play-off games in Antalya Atatürk Stadium to determine the third team to be promoted to First League.

Mersin İdmanyurdu took place in Group 1 consisted of 10 teams and finished first stage at third place and couldn't take place in promotion group. In classification group, team finished at top and attended to promotion play-off games but eliminated at first round (quarter finals).

=== Results summary ===
Mersin İdmanyurdu (MİY) 1998–99 Second League season league summary:

	Overall									Home								Away							
Stage	Pc	Pl	W	D	L	GF	GA	GD	Pt	Pl	W	D	L	GF	GA	GD	Pt	Pl	W	D	L	GF	GA	GD	Pt
Ranking Group	3	18	11	0	7	31	21	+10	33	9	7	0	2	18	9	+9	21	9	4	0	5	13	12	+1	12
Classification Group	4	14	6	3	5	22	19	+3	21	7	6	1	0	15	4	+11	19	7	0	2	5	7	15	-8	2
Overall	1	32	17	3	12	53	40	+13	54	16	13	1	2	33	13	+20	40	16	4	2	10	20	27	-7	14

Sources: 1998–99 Turkish Second Football League pages.

=== Ranking group league table ===
Mersin İY's league performance in TFF Second League Ranking Group 1 in 1998–99 season is shown in the following table.

Pc	Team	Games				Goals		Pts	Home			Away		
Pc	Team	Pl	W	D	L	F	A	Pts	F–A	R	Pc	F–A	R	Pc
1	Sarıyer (Q)	18	11	3	4	45	26	36	0–4	5	3	0–2	14	2
2	İstanbul Büyükşehir Belediyespor (Q)	18	11	2	5	41	24	35	1–2	8	3	0–2	17	3
3	Mersin İdmanyurdu	18	11	0	7	31	21	33						
4	Konyaspor	18	9	2	7	29	28	27	2–0	11	2	2–1	2	3
5	Zeytinburnuspor	18	8	4	6	24	19	28	2–0	7	3	0–2	16	2
6	Sankospor	18	7	2	9	26	31	24	2–0	13	2	3–0	4	1
7	Adana Demirspor	18	4	8	6	19	22	20	3–1	18	3	3–1	9	3
8	Hatayspor	18	5	4	9	20	28	19	2–1	15	2	0–1	6	4
9	Bakırköyspor	18	4	4	10	18	31	16	2–0	1	2	4–0	10	3
10	Kilimli Belediyespor	18	3	5	10	28	51	14	4–1	3	1	1–3	12	3

Three points for a win. Rules for classification: 1) points; 2) tie-break; 3) goal difference; 4) number of goals scored. In the score columns first scores belong to MİY.
(Q): Qualified to 1998–99 Second League Promotion Group.
Source: 1998–99 Turkish Second Football League pages from TFF website, Turkish-Soccer website, and Maçkolik website.

=== Ranking group games ===
Mersin İdmanyurdu (MİY) 1998–99 Second League season first half game reports in Ranking Group 1 is shown in the following table. Kick off times are in EET and EEST.

14 September 1998 Round 1	Mersin İdmanyurdu	2–0	Bakırköyspor	Tevfik Sırrı Gür Stadium, Mersin
Monday 17:30	Erdal Tanhan 34' (F); Gökhan Sakar 58' (F); Murat Erdoğan (yellow card) 54'; Gökhan Kolomoç (yellow card) 77'	Report	(yellow card) 40' Faruk Özbekir; (yellow card) 74' Ahmet Kilimcioğlu	Referee: Turgat Duman

23 September 1998 Round 2	Konyaspor	1–2	Mersin İdmanyurdu	Atatürk Stadium, Konya
Wednesday, 19:00	Mustafa Eraydın 58' (F); Haci İkizer (yellow card) 5'; Sinan Ertan (yellow card) 17'; Metin Karaca (yellow card) 64'; Dursun Yeğen (yellow card) 77'; Hakan Kaygusuz (yellow card) 89'	Report	24' (F) Gökhan Sakar; 60' (F) Gökhan Sakar; (yellow card) 12' Türkay Başaran; (yellow card) 59' Murat Erdoğan; (yellow card) 87' Bülent Kapıcı; (yellow card) 87' Erdal Tanhan; (yellow card) 89' Gökhan Sakar; (yellow card) 89' Ferit Kaya	Referee: Zafer Önder İpek

30 August 1998 Round 3	Mersin İdmanyurdu	4–1	Kilimli Belediyespor	Tevfik Sırrı Gür Stadium, Mersin
Sunday, 17:00	Gökhan Sakar 34' (F); Erdal Tanhan 62' (F); Gökhan Sakar 79' (F); Ferit Kaya 85' (F)	Report	22' (F) Ayhan Şirin; (yellow card) 18' İhsan Burak Özsaraç; (yellow card) 30' Recep Eşkin; (yellow card) 43' Ayhan Şirin; (yellow card) 60' Ömür Emirzeoğlu; (red card) 76' Ogün Yaşar Aydın; (red card) 77' Hakan Bozdağ	Referee: Muslehattin Demircan

4 September 1998 Round 4	Sankospor	0–3	Mersin İdmanyurdu	Kamil Ocak Stadium, Gaziantep
Friday, 18:00	Abdullah Eryiğit (yellow card) 24'	Report	76' (F) Ferit Kaya; 88' (F) Murat Erdoğan; 90' (F) Akın Sağlam; (yellow card) 9' Ersan Parlatan; (yellow card) 26' Bülent Kapıcı; (yellow card) 28' Erdal Tanhan; (yellow card) 56' Murat Akay; (yellow card) 73' Gökhan Sakar; (yellow card) 81' Murat Erdoğan	Referee: Turgut Sığıç

13 September 1998 Round 5	Mersin İdmanyurdu	0–4	Sarıyer	Tevfik Sırrı Gür Stadium, Mersin
Sunday, 16:00	Erdal Tanhan (yellow card) 22'; Bülent Kapıcı (red card) 27'; Ferit Kaya (yellow card) 30'; Türkay Başaran (yellow card) 35'; Ünal Bulut (yellow card) 44'	Report	28' (pen.) Nail Uğur Timurcioğlu; 37' (F) Berkant Kahraman; 60' (F) Nail Uğur Timurcioğlu; 66' (F) Sadettin Demirtaş; (yellow card) 9' Ümit Algür; (yellow card) 65' Ender Özinç	Referee: Ünsal Çimen

20 September 1998 Round 6	Hatayspor	1–0	Mersin İdmanyurdu	T. Sökmen Stadium, Antakya, Hatay
Sunday, 16:00	Bülent Bölükbaşı 86' (F); Bayram Toysal (yellow card) 88'	Report	(yellow card) 24' Tolga Erdem; (yellow card) 33' Abdussamet Yiğit; (yellow card) 42' Ersan Parlatan	Referee: Dursun Cumali Sucu

27 September 1998 Round 7	Mersin İdmanyurdu	2–0	Zeytinburnuspor	Tevfik Sırrı Gür Stadium, Mersin
Sunday, 16:000	Gökhan Sakar 20' (F); Gökhan Sakar 66' (pen.); Abdussamet Yiğit (yellow card) 32'; Gökhan Kolomoç (yellow card) 35'; Oğuzhan Doğar (yellow card) 63'; Ferit Kaya (yellow card) 86'	Report	(yellow card) 18' Hayrettin Demirbaş; (yellow card) 35' Hakan Şimşek; (yellow card) 56' Levent Açıkgöz; (yellow card) 85' Kenan Yelek	Referee: Sebahattin Şahin

4 October 1998 Round 8	Mersin İdmanyurdu	1–2	İstanbul BŞB	Tevfik Sırrı Gür Stadium, Mersin
Sunday, 15:00	Gökhan Sakar 82' (F); Gökhan Kolomoç (yellow card) 44'; Gökhan Sakar (yellow card) 75'	Report	44' (pen.) Zafer Turan; 60' (F) İhsan Okay; (yellow card) 52' Zafer Turan; (yellow card) 77' Ozan köprülü	Referee: Ali Aydın

11 October 1998 Round 9	Adana Demirspor	1–3	Mersin İdmanyurdu	5 Ocak Stadium, Adana
Sunday, 18:00	Fatih Adıbelli 87' (F); Cem Hallaçeli (yellow card) 68'; Serkan Selçuk (yellow card) 88'	Report	5' (F) Gökhan Sakar; 55' (F) Gökhan Sakar; 76' (F) Murat Erdoğan; (yellow card) 45' Murat Erdoğan; (yellow card) 73' Murat Akay	Referee: Namık Orhan

18 October 1998 Round 10	Bakırköyspor	0–4	Mersin İdmanyurdu	Şenlikköy Stadium, Bakırköy, Istanbul
Sunday, 15:30	Ramazan Konya (yellow card) 8'; Bilge Gümüştepe (yellow card) 16'; Erkan Aydın (red card) 48'; Faruk Özbekir (yellow card) 70'	Report	42' (F) Akın Sağlam; 65' (F) Akın Sağlam; 89' (F) Akın Sağlam; 90' (F) Gökhan Sakar; (yellow card) 15' Önal Arıca; (yellow card) 33' Gökhan Sakar; (yellow card) 44' Ersan Parlatan; (yellow card) 67' Murat Erdoğan; (yellow card) 70' Tolga Erdem; (yellow card) 85' Ferit Kaya	Referee: Oğuz Sarvan

25 October 1998 Round 11	Mersin İdmanyurdu	2–0	Konyaspor	Tevfik Sırrı Gür Stadium, Mersin
Sunday, 13:30	Erdal Tanhan 80' (pen.); İsmet Keser 85' (F); Erdal Tanhan (yellow card) 13'; Türkay Başaran (yellow card) 39'; Köksal Ferizcan (yellow card) 49'; Abdussamet Yiğit (yellow card) 83'	Report	(yellow card) 37' Ertuğrul Şerbetçi; (red card) 38' Hakan Kaygusuz; (yellow card) 60' İskender Eroğlu	Referee: Şahin Taşkınsoy

1 November 1998 Round 12	Kilimli Belediyespor	3–1	Mersin İdmanyurdu	City Stadium, Zonguldak
Sunday, 13:30	Onur Dinçtürk 29' (F); Tarkan Özyılmaz 40' (F); Tarkan Alkan 43' (F); Hamit Yüksel (yellow card) 51'; Nail Türkan (red card) 51'; Tarkan Özyılmaz (yellow card) 52'; İhsan Burak Özsaraç (yellow card) 72'	Report	78' (F) Gökhan Sakar; (yellow card) 62' Gökhan Kolomoç	Referee: İsmet Arzuman

8 November 1998 Round 13	Mersin İdmanyurdu	2–0	Sankospor	Tevfik Sırrı Gür Stadium, Mersin
Sunday, 13:30	Gökhan Sakar 27' (F); Gökhan Sakar 82' (pen.); Akın Sağlam (yellow card) 69'; Abdussamet Yiğit (yellow card) 71'; Murat Akay (yellow card) 88'	Report	(yellow card) 36' Ali Uğur Balibey; (yellow card) 82' Mehmet Ali Topal; (yellow card) 83' Mustafa Diliçıkık; (yellow card) 84' Yusuf Bahçeci	Referee: Harun Yiğit

15 November 1998 Round 14	Sarıyer	2–0	Mersin İdmanyurdu	Y.Z. Öniş Stadium, Sarıyer, Istanbul
Sunday, 12:00	Berkant Kahraman 7' (F); Ergin Döner 65' (pen.); Fevzi Açıkgöz (yellow card) 72'; Serkan Özdemir (red card) 82'; Salih Karalar (yellow card) 90'	Report	(yellow card) 19'} Ersan Parlatan; (yellow card) 35' Önal Arıca; (red card) 84' Gökhan Kolomoç	Referee: Murat Ilgaz

22 November 1998 Round 15	Mersin İdmanyurdu	2–1	Hatayspor	Tevfik Sırrı Gür Stadium, Mersin
Sunday, 13:30	Akın Sağlam 14' (F); Gökhan Sakar 22' (pen.); Murat Erdoğan (yellow card) 47'; Ferit Kaya (yellow card) 68'	Report	33' (F) Levent Öztürk; (yellow card) 21' Kemal Dulda; (yellow card) 53' İlhan Palut; (yellow card) 54' Hakan Özyay; (yellow card) 84' Bülent Bölükbaşı	Referee: Ziya Çetin

29 November 1998 Round 16	Zeytinburnuspor	2–0	Mersin İdmanyurdu	Z.burnu Stadium, Z.burnu, Istanbul
Sunday, 14:00	Nedim Yiğit 11' (F); Mehmet Gökhan Terci 23' (F); Kenan Yelek (yellow card) 8'; Nedim Yiğit (yellow card) 56'; Ahmet Arslaner (yellow card) 72'	Report	(yellow card) 52' Akın Sağlam; (yellow card) 61' Türkay Başaran	Referee: Faruk Saçar

6 December 1998 Round 17	İstanbul BŞB	2–0	Mersin İdmanyurdu	Ç. Emeç Stadium, B.paşa, Istanbul
Sunday, 13:30	İhsan Okay 4' (F); Sinan Korkmaz (yellow card) 23'; Hakan Erken (yellow card) 48'; Ozan Köprülü (yellow card) 81'; Mustafa Sarıgül (yellow card) 90'	Report	42' (o.g.) Köksal Ferizcan; (yellow card) 48' Gökhan Sakar; (yellow card) 66' Köksal Ferizcan	Referee: Sebahattin Şahin

13 December 1998 Round 18	Mersin İdmanyurdu	3–1	Adana Demirspor	Tevfik Sırrı Gür Stadium, Mersin
Sunday, 13:30	Gökhan Kolomoç 15' (F); Murat Erdoğan 25' (F); Ersan Parlatan 58' (F); Önal Arıca (yellow card) 51'	Report	23' (F) Zafer Ekici; (yellow card) 24' Ümit Yücel; (yellow card) 74' Arman Bozkaya	Referee: Zafer Önder İpek

Sources: 1998–99 Turkish Second Football League pages.

=== Classification group league table ===
Classification group 1 was played with 8 teams remaining after top two of ranking group were promoted to promotion group. Top team in the group promoted to promotion play-offs, while bottom two teams relegated to 1998–99 Third League season. Points and goals were carried from ranking group. MİY obtained 6 wins, 3 draws and 5 losses and finished fourth. However, because points and goals were carried from ranking group, in aggregate MİY finished first and became eligible to play promotion play-offs. Mersin İY's league performance in Second League Classification Group 1 in 1998–99 season is shown in the following table.

Pc	Team	Games				Goals		Pts	Home			Away		
Pc	Team	Pl	W	D	L	F	A	Pts	F–A	R	Pc	F–A	R	Pc
1	Mersin İdmanyurdu (Q)	32	17	3	12	53	40	54						
2	Sankospor	32	14	4	14	57	54	46	2–1	1	1	2–4	8	1
3	Zeytinburnuspor	32	12	8	12	40	36	44	2–0	10	1	0–2	3	1
4	Bakırköyspor	32	10	11	11	40	42	41	3–1	4	1	0–1	11	1
5	Hatayspor	32	11	8	13	45	49	41	4–1	9	1	1–2	2	1
6	Konyaspor	32	11	8	13	40	51	41	0–0	6	1	3–3	13	1
7	Adana Demirspor (R)	32	8	13	11	37	42	37	2–0	12	1	1–1	5	1
8	Kilimli Belediyespor (R)	32	6	10	16	41	75	28	2–1	14	1	0–2	7	1

Three points for a win. Rules for classification: 1) points; 2) tie-break; 3) goal difference; 4) number of goals scored. In the score columns first scores belong to MİY.
(Q): Qualified to 1998–99 Promotion Play-offs; (R): Relegated to 1999–2000 Turkish Third Football League.
Source: 1998–99 Turkish Second Football League pages from TFF website, Turkish-Soccer website, and Maçkolik website.

=== Classification group games ===
Mersin İdmanyurdu (MİY) 1998–99 Second League season first half game reports in Classification Group 1 is shown in the following table. Kick off times are in EET and EEST.

14 February 1999 Round 1	Mersin İdmanyurdu	2–1	Sankospor	Tevfik Sırrı Gür Stadium, Mersin
Sunday, 13:30	Gökhan Sakar 43' (pen.); Murat Erdoğan 80' (F); Erdal Tarhan (yellow card) 26'	Report	55' (F) Yusuf Bahçeci; (yellow card) 10' Yusuf Bahçeci; (yellow card) 43' Mehmet Ali Topal; (yellow card) 44' Musa Kahraman; (red card) 80' Mehmet Balcı	Referee: Dursun Cumali Sucu

21 February 1999 Round 2	Hatayspor	2–1	Mersin İdmanyurdu	T. Sökmen Stadium, Antakya, Hatay
Sunday, 13:30	Bülent Bölükbaşı 76' (F); Ahmet Taşyürek (yellow card) 67'	Report	57' (o.g.) Türkay Başaran; 79' (F) Ünal Bulut; (yellow card) 29' Ersan Parlatan; (yellow card) 32' Murat Erdoğan; (yellow card) 38' Ferit Kaya	Referee: Muslehattin Demircan

28 February 1999 Round 3	Zeytinburnuspor	2–0	Mersin İdmanyurdu	Z.burnu Stadium, Z.burnu, Istanbul
Wednesday, 13:30	Ali Çakır 38' (F); Mehmet Gökhan Terci 89' (pen.); Ahmet Arslaner (yellow card) 29'; Bülent Şentürk (yellow card) 62'; Levent Açıkgöz (yellow card) 63'; Ali Çakır (yellow card) 81'	Report	(yellow card) 29' Bora Çebi; (yellow card) 37' Türkay Başaran; (yellow card) 75' Gökhan Kolomoç	Referee: Kazım Erçakır

7 March 1999 Round 4	Mersin İdmanyurdu	3–1	Bakırköyspor	Tevfik Sırrı Gür Stadium, Mersin
Sunday, 13:30	Akın Sağlam 16' (F); Mustafa Çevirgen 67' (F); Gökhan Sakar 89' (F); Gökhan Kolomoç (yellow card) 55'; Zeynel Abidin Oktay (yellow card) 84'; Oğuzhan Doğar (yellow card) 87'	Report	57' (F) Kasım Çıkla; (yellow card) 17' Bülent Şimşek; (red card) 40' Erkan Aydın; (yellow card) 65' Kasım Çıkla; (yellow card) 66' Rüstem İsmailoğlu; (yellow card) 86' Ramazan Konya	Referee: Mutlu Çelik

13 March 1999 Round 5	Adana Demirspor	1–1	Mersin İdmanyurdu	5 Ocak Stadium, Adana
Saturday, 13:30	Ender Traş 40' (pen.); Recep Atılgan 55' (o.g.); Tuncay Meriç (yellow card) 4'; Şener Demir (yellow card) 72'	Report	(yellow card) 30' Ersan Parlatan; (yellow card) 62' Murat Akay	Referee: Oguz Uğurlu

21 March 1999 Round 6	Mersin İdmanyurdu	0–0	Konyaspor	Tevfik Sırrı Gür Stadium, Mersin
Sunday, 13:30	Önal Arıca (yellow card) 16'; Mustafa Çevirgen (yellow card) 39'; Ferit Kaya (yellow card) 63'	Report	(yellow card) 13' Ertuğrul Şerbetçi; (yellow card) 38' Mustafa Eraydın; (yellow card) 43' Serdar Akçay	Referee: Namık Orhan

28 March 1999 Round 7	Kilimli Belediyespor	2–0	Mersin İdmanyurdu	City Stadium, Kilimli, Zonguldak
Sunday, 14:30	Hamit Yüksel 84' (F); Onur Dinçtürk 88' (F); Ogün Yaşar Aydın (yellow card) 43'; Tarkan Özyılmaz (yellow card) 84'; Selahattin Bayar (yellow card) 87'	Report	(yellow card) 43' Mustafa Çevirgen; (yellow card) 64' Ersan Parlatan; (yellow card) 89' Gökhan Kolomoç	Referee: Ziya Çetin

4 April 1999 Round 8	Sankospor	4–2	Mersin İdmanyurdu	Kamil Ocak Stadium, Gaziantep
Sunday,14:30	Mustafa Diliçıkık 28' (F); Ali Borazan 48' (F); Mustafa Diliçıkık 82' (F); Mustafa Diliçıkık 90' (F); Hasan Yurt (yellow card) 30'; Yusuf Bahçeci (red card) 70'	Report	64' (F) Ferit Kaya; 89' (F) Zeynel Abidin Oktay; (yellow card) 30' Tolga Erdem	Referee: Celil Aykan

11 April 1999 Round 9	Mersin İdmanyurdu	4–1	Hatayspor	Tevfik Sırrı Gür Stadium, Mersin
Sunday, 14:30	Ferit Kaya 4' (F); Ferit Alper Salgın 8' (F); Gökhan Sakar 20' (F); Gökhan Sakar 40' (F); Gökhan Sakar (yellow card) 29'; Ferit Kaya (yellow card) 44'; Murat Akay (yellow card) 65'	Report	16' (F) Talip Uysal; (yellow card) 27' Bekir Ceyhan	Referee: Bülent Uzun

17 April 1999 Round 10	Mersin İdmanyurdu	2–0	Zeytinburnuspor	Tevfik Sırrı Gür Stadium, Mersin
Saturday, 15:30	Zeynel Abidin Oktay 58' (F); Zeynel Abidin Oktay 70' (F)	Report	(yellow card) 73' Enis Sağsen	Referee: Dursun Cumali Sucu

25 April 1999 Round 11	Bakırköyspor	1–0	Mersin İdmanyurdu	Şenlikköy Stadium, Bakırköy, Istanbul
Sunday, 15:30	Bülent Şimşek 77' (F); Faruk Özbekir (yellow card) 88'	Report	(yellow card) 62' Tolga Erdem	Referee: Yılnur Önen

1 May 1999 Round 12	Mersin İdmanyurdu	2–0	Adana Demirspor	Tevfik Sırrı Gür Stadium, Mersin
Saturday, 15:30	Ferit Alper Salgın 24' (F); Zeynel Abidin Oktay 78' (F); Ferit Kaya (yellow card) 33'; Akın Sağlam (yellow card) 51'; Ersan Parlatan (yellow card) 89'	Report	(yellow card) 61' Ender Traş	Referee: Mustafa Arslan

9 May 1999 Round 13	Konyaspor	3–3	Mersin İdmanyurdu	Atatürk Stadium, Konya
Sunday, 15:30	Hakan Kaygusuz 4' (F); Hakan Kaygusuz 14' (o.g.); Suvat Karadağ 11' (F); Mehmet Yıldırım 67' (F); Ertuğrul Şerbetçi (yellow card) 35'; Hakan Kaygusuz (yellow card) 48'; Mustafa Eraydın (yellow card) 85'; Mehmet Yıldırım (yellow card) 87'	Report	32' (F) Zeynel Abidin Oktay; 44' (F) Akın Sağlam; (yellow card) 73' Gökhan Kolomoç; (yellow card) 86'Akın Sağlam; (yellow card) 89' Bora Çebi	Referee: Adem Yapraklıoğlu

15 May 1999 Round 14	Mersin İdmanyurdu	2–1	Kilimli Belediyespor	Tevfik Sırrı Gür Stadium, Mersin
Saturday, 15:30	Gökhan Sakar 13' (F); Ersan Parlatan 68' (F); Murat Akay (yellow card) 80'	Report	16' (F) Selahattin Bayar	Referee: Nurettin Saka

Sources: 1998–99 Turkish Second Football League pages.

=== Promotion play-offs ===
Five classification group winners and the teams who took 3rd, 4th and 5th places in promotion group played promotion play-offs at a neutral venue. Play-offs played in one-leg elimination system in Antalya between 24 and 30 May 1997. In quarter finals Mersin İdmanyurdu was eliminated by Çaykur Rizespor who finished Promotion Group at fifth place. Later Kartalspor has been eliminated by Göztepe at finals and Promotion Group second runners-up Göztepe won play-offs.

Game details:

25 May 1999 Play-offs QF	Çaykur Rizespor	2–0	Mersin İdmanyurdu	Atatürk Stadium, Antalya
Tuesday, 18:00	Zeki Sonbay 15' (F); Emre Eren 70' (pen.); Haydar Özdemir (yellow card) 15'; Cengiz Alp (yellow card) 21'; Yusuf Tokuş (yellow card) 24'	Report	(yellow card) 7' Mustafa Çevirgen; (yellow card) 30' Gökhan Kolomoç; (red card) 60' Ferit Kaya	Referee: Oğuz Sarvan

Source: 1998–99 Turkish Second Football League Promotion Play-offs pages.

== 1998–99 Turkish Cup participation ==
1998–99 Turkish Cup was played by 90 teams in 6 rounds prior to quarterfinals. First five round were played in one-leg elimination system, starting from 6th round two leg elimination rounds were played. [Mersin İdmanyurdu] had participated in 37th Turkish Cup (played as Türkiye Kupası in 1998–99) at Round 2 and eliminated. The opponents Hatayspor were from Second League like MİY. Previous year Hatayspor was the team to which MİY had lost in 4th round. Galatasaray won the cup for the 12th time.

=== Cup track ===
The drawings and results Mersin İdmanyurdu (MİY) followed in 1998–99 Turkish Cup are shown in the following table.

Round	Own League	Opponent's League	Opponent	A/H	Score	Result
Round 2	Second League	Second League	Hatayspor	H	3–4	Eliminated

Note: In the above table 'Score' shows For and Against goals whether the match played at home or not.

=== Game details ===
Mersin İdmanyurdu (MİY) 1998–99 Turkish Cup game reports is shown in the following table. Kick off times are in EET and EEST.

9 September 1998 Round 2	Mersin İdmanyurdu	3–4	Hatayspor	Tevfik Sırrı Gür Stadium, Mersin
Wednesday, 14:00	Gökhan Sakar 17' (F); Gökhan Sakar 59' (F); Akın Sağlam 67' (F); Tolga Erdem (yellow card) 46'	Report	7' (F) Bekir Ceyhan; 32' (F) Bekir Ceyhan; 69' (F) Ahmet Taşyürek; 80' (F) Bülent Görgün; (yellow card) 70' Bayram Toysal; (yellow card) 80' Ahmet Taşyürek	Referee: Kadir Özdemir

Source: 1998–99 Turkish Cup pages.

== Management ==
=== Club management ===
Municipality official Mehmet Küver was president of the club at the start of the season. Halil Kuriş was acting mayor of Mersin city. However, on 18 April 1999 local elections were held in Turkey, and mayor of the city changed. Macit Özcan won the elections in Mersin. Mayors presided the club many times in its history and Özcan elected president in club congress.

=== Coaching team ===
Müjdat Yalman was head coach at the first half of the season. Kahraman Karataş came to the position before the start of the second stage and completed the season.

1998–99 Mersin İdmanyurdu head coaches:

Nat	Head coach	Period	Pl	W	D	L	Notes
(Turkey)	Müjdat Yalman	01.07.1998 – 14.12.1999	19	11	0	8	Left after first stage.
(Turkey)	Kahraman Karataş	11.02.1999 – 31.05.1999	14	6	3	5	Contract ended at the end of the season.

Note: Only official games were included.

== 1998–99 squad ==
Appearances, goals and cards count for 1998–99 Second League Ranking and Classification Groups games, promotion play-offs QF game and 1998–99 Turkish Cup. 18 players appeared in each game roster, three to be replaced. Players who only appeared in game rosters were included and listed in order of appearance.

O	N	Nat	Name	Birth	Born	Pos	LA	LG	CA	CG	TA	TG	Booked	Sent off (straight red)	← Season Notes →
1	1	(Turkey)	Oğuzhan Doğar	1 Jun 1978	Osmaniye	GK	32				32		2		→ previous season.
2	2	(Turkey)	Murat Akay	19 Jul 1976	Mersin	DF	29		1		30		6		1998 ST Konyaspor.
3	3	(Turkey)	Samet Yiğit	2 Feb 1975	Muş	DF	16		1		17		4		1998 ST Balıkesirspor.
4	4	(Turkey)	Gökhan Kolomoç	28 May 1977	Akçaabat	DF	26	1			26	1	9	1	1998 SL Trabzonspor.
5	5	(Turkey)	Türkay Başaran	20 Sep 1966	Çanakkale	DF	31				31		5		→ previous season.
6	6	(Turkey)	İsmet Keser	5 Jan 1974	Erdemli	MF	5	1	1		6	1			→ previous season.
7	7	(Turkey)	Ersan Parlatan	1 Aug 1977	Berlin	MF	29	2			29	2	8		1998 SL Gençlerbirliği.
8	8	(Turkey)	Bülent Kapıcı	29 Aug 1973	Istanbul	MF	6				6		2	1	→ previous season.
9	9	(Turkey)	Erdal Tanhan	1 Nov 1978	Van	MF	23	3	1		24	3	5		1998 SL Gaziantepspor.
10	10	(Turkey)	Gökhan Sakar	7 Apr 1975	Osmaniye	FW	31	20	1	2	32	22	6		→ previous season.
11	11	(Turkey)	Murat Erdoğan	1 Aug 1976	London	FW	22	4			22	4	7		→ previous season.
12	12	(Turkey)	Hakan Baygın	14 Aug 1969	Mersin	GK			1		1				→ previous season.
13	13	(Turkey)	Ferit Kaya	2 Jan 1975	Afşin	MF	27	4			27	4	9	1	→ previous season.
14	14	(Turkey)	Durmuş Tozlu	19 Feb 1979	Elbistan	DF	4		1		5				1998 ST İskenderun DÇ.
15	15	(Turkey)	Nurullah Saygılı	10 Sep 1976	Kiğı	FW	1		1		2				→ previous season.
16	16	(Turkey)	İbrahim Durmuşlu	22 May 1973	Silifke	DF	1		1		2				→ previous season.
17	17	(Turkey)	Abidin Oktay	12 Aug 1976	Mardin	FW	21	5	1		22	5	1		1998 ST Ü. Anadolu.
18	18	(Turkey)	Önal Arıca	23 Feb 1976	Mersin	DF	30				30		4		→ previous season.
19	18	(Turkey)	Akın Sağlam	16 Dec 1977	Trabzon	MF	28	7	1	1	29	8	4		1998 SL Trabzonspor.
20	13	(Turkey)	Ünal Bulut	3 Jan 1975	Konya	DF	28	1	1		29	1	1		1998 ST Kütahyaspor.
21	18	(Turkey)	Önder Karaveli	26 Mar 1974	Istanbul	FW									1998 ST Ü. Anadolu.
22	12	(Turkey)	Bekir Arpacı	2 Apr 1975	Hatay	GK	2				2				1998 ST Kilis Belediye.
23	15	(Turkey)	Tolga Erdem	6 Jan 1975	Ankara	DF	15		1		16		5		1998 ST Petrolofisi.
24	17	(Turkey)	Köksal Ferizcan	13 Oct 1968	Ankara	MF	15	1	1		16	1	2		1998 ST Petrolofisi.
25	14	(Turkey)	Serdar Çelebi	13 Mar 1972	Giresun	MF	5				5				1999 WL Gençlerbirliği.
26	15	(Turkey)	Bora Çebi	6 Mar 1975	Ordu	MF	6				6		2		1999 WT Zonguldakspor.
27	17	(Turkey)	Mustafa Çevirgen	12 Feb 1973	Adana	DF	10	1			10	1	3		→ previous season.
28	18	(Turkey)	Alper Salgın	29 Sep 1975	Niğde	FW	12	2			12	2			1999 WL Niğdespor.
29	16	(Turkey)	Salim Çömert	1 Jan 1982	Mersin	FW									Amateur player.
30	17	(Turkey)	Serdar Sucu	18 Apr 1982	Mersin	MF									Amateur player.

Sources: TFF club page and maçkolik team page.

== See also ==
- Football in Turkey
