= 1997–98 Mersin İdmanyurdu season =

Mersin İdmanyurdu
1997–98 season
- President: H. Okan Merzeci (till 20 October 1997); Mehmet Küver (since 21 October 1997)
- Head coach: Zafer Bilgetay (till 18 September 1997); Kasım Gündüz (till 12 February 1998); Zafer Göncüler (till 31 May 1998)
- Stadium: Tevfik Sırrı Gür Stadium; Mersin, Turkey
- Second League: Ranking Group 1: 6th Classification Group 1: 6th
- Turkish Cup: Eliminated at R4
- Top goalscorer: League: Hakan Kayalar (10); All: Hakan Kayalar (10)
Home colours	Away colours	Third colours

Mersin İdmanyurdu (also Mersin İdman Yurdu, Mersin İY, or MİY) Sports Club; located in Mersin, east Mediterranean coast of Turkey in 1997–98. Mersin İdmanyurdu (MİY) participated in Second League 1997–98 season for the 24th time. MİY had a bad season in league and finished 6th. The team also participated in Turkish Cup in 1997–98 and eliminated at Round 4.

H. Okan Merzeci was succeeded by Mehmet Küver as president of the club. Zafer Bilgetay was head coach at the start of the season. Kasım Gündüz completed first half of the season. In the second half Zafer Göncüler managed the team. Türkay Başaran had the most appearances, 32, while Hakan Kayalar was the league and season top goalscorer with 10 goals.

== 1997–98 Second League participation ==
Mersin İdmanyurdu took place in Group 1 in Second League 1997–98 season. League played in three stages. In the first stage 51 teams in five groups (one with 11 and others with 10 clubs) played for first two rankings to play in promotion group. The promotion group consisted of those 10 teams. At the end of the second stage top two teams promoted to First League 1998–99. Remaining 8 teams in each ranking group and ninth team in 2nd group played in classification groups, by carrying points and goals from ranking groups. Bottom two teams relegated to Third League 1998–99 at the end of the season. In the third stage, 8 clubs (3 from the promotion group and 1 each from 5 classification groups) played one-leg play-off games in Eskişehir Atatürk Stadium to determine the third team to be promoted to First League.

Mersin İdmanyurdu took place in Group 1 consisted of 10 teams and finished first stage at sixth place and couldn't take a place in promotion group. In classification group, team finished 6th again and couldn't attend to promotion play-off games.

=== Results summary ===
Mersin İdmanyurdu (MİY) 1997–98 Second League season league summary:

	Overall									Home								Away							
Stage	Pc	Pl	W	D	L	GF	GA	GD	Pt	Pl	W	D	L	GF	GA	GD	Pt	Pl	W	D	L	GF	GA	GD	Pt
Ranking Group	6	18	4	8	6	26	26	0	20	9	3	4	2	19	13	+6	13	9	1	4	4	7	13	-6	7
Classification Group	5	14	5	3	6	18	17	+1	18	7	5	1	1	11	4	+7	16	7	0	2	5	7	13	-6	2
Overall	6	32	9	11	12	44	43	+1	38	16	8	5	3	30	17	+13	29	16	1	6	9	14	26	-12	9

Sources: 1997–98 Turkish Second Football League pages.

=== Ranking group league table ===
Mersin İY's league performance in TFF Second League Ranking Group 1 in 1997–98 season is shown in the following table.

Pc	Team	Games				Goals		Pts	Home			Away		
Pc	Team	Pl	W	D	L	F	A	Pts	F–A	R	Pc	F–A	R	Pc
1	Adanaspor (Q)	18	11	2	5	37	23	35	2–1	17	6	0–3	8	8
2	Sarıyer (Q)	18	10	4	4	33	21	34	1–1	15	6	1–1	6	6
3	İstanbul Büyükşehir Belediyespor	18	9	4	5	30	26	31	2–3	5	6	0–0	14	6
4	Hatayspor	18	7	6	5	25	22	27	2–2	4	6	1–1	13	7
5	Konyaspor	18	6	6	6	21	20	24	0–0	7	6	1–1	16	6
6	Mersin İdmanyurdu	18	4	8	6	26	26	20						
7	Boluspor	18	5	5	8	22	28	20	5–2	12	7	0–2	3	7
8	Kemerspor	18	5	5	8	22	33	20	5–1	9	7	1–2	18	6
9	Bakırköyspor	18	4	5	9	23	31	17	0–1	10	7	2–1	1	1
10	Gaziosmanpaşaspor	18	3	7	8	17	26	16	2–2	2	2	1–2	11	7

Three points for a win. Rules for classification: 1) points; 2) tie-break; 3) goal difference; 4) number of goals scored. In the score columns first scores belong to MİY.
(Q): Qualified to 1997–98 Second League Promotion Group.
Source: 1997–98 Turkish Second Football League pages from TFF website, Turkish-Soccer website, and Maçkolik website.

=== Ranking group games ===
Mersin İdmanyurdu (MİY) 1997–98 Second League season first half game reports in Ranking Group 1 is shown in the following table. Kick off times are in EET and EEST.

24 August 1997 Round 1	Bakırköyspor	1–2	Mersin İdmanyurdu	Şenlikköy Std., Bakırköy, Istanbul
Sunday, 17:00	Engin Çalışkan 76' (F); Kasım Çıkla (yellow card) 13'; Ahmet Kilimcioğlu (red card) 82'; Mahmut Taşdemir (yellow card) 88'	Report	7' (F) Hakan Kayalar; 32' (F) Recep Yavaş; (yellow card) 5' Bülent Kapıcı	Referee: Sebahattin Bitirim

31 August 1997 Round 2	Mersin İdmanyurdu	2–2	Gaziosmanpaşaspor	Tevfik Sırrı Gür Stadium, Mersin
Sunday, 17:00	Kemal Yardımcı 62' (F); Kemal Yardımcı 87' (F); Hüseyin Gün (yellow card) 62'; Kemal Yardımcı (yellow card) 89'	Report	71' (F) Ümit Karabaş; 82' (F) Atilla Alioğlu; (yellow card) 31' Doğan Pek; (yellow card) 52' Fatih Diker	Referee: Selami Şimşek

7 September 1997 Round 3	Boluspor	2–0	Mersin İdmanyurdu	City Stadium, Bolu
Sunday, 16:00	Tuncay Hakan Güzey 37' (F); Tuncay Hakan Güzey 46' (F); Suat Yakut (yellow card) 50'; Kerim Kara (yellow card) 57'	Report	(yellow card) 31' Hüseyin Gün; (yellow card) 62' Hakan Turgut	Referee: Levent Yardımcı

14 September 1997 Round 4	Mersin İdmanyurdu	2–2	Hatayspor	Tevfik Sırrı Gür Stadium, Mersin
Sunday, 16:00	Hakan Kayalar 2' (F); Recep Yavaş 21' (F); Hakan Turgut (yellow card) 61'; Önal Arıca (yellow card) 85'	Report	48' (F) Mehmet Kakil; 65' (F) Yunus Altun; (yellow card) 53' Hakan Özyay; (yellow card) 60' Mehmet Kakil; (yellow card) 65' Mustafa Hakan Şimşek	Referee: Habeşi Bilal Kutlu

21 September 1997 Round 5	Mersin İdmanyurdu	2–3	İstanbul BŞB	Tevfik Sırrı Gür Stadium, Mersin
Sunday, 16:00	Recep Yavaş 33' (F); Hüseyin Gün 47' (F); Bülent Kapıcı (yellow card) 64'	Report	53' (F) Bünyamin Kubat; 63' (F) Bünyamin Kubat; 76' (F) Cem Baki; (yellow card) 57' Halit Köprülü	Referee: Kenan Gökkaya

28 September 1997 Round 6	Sarıyer	1–1	Mersin İdmanyurdu	Y.Z. Öniş Stadium, Sarıyer, Istanbul
Sunday, 16:30	Nail Uğur Timurcioğlu 3' (F); Ender Özinç (yellow card) 43'; Hakan Çimen (yellow card) 68'; Nail Uğur Timurcioğlu (yellow card) 83'; Ersel Uzgur (yellow card) 88'	Report	85' (F) Fazlı Ulusoy; (yellow card) 48' Önal Arıca; (yellow card) 51' Mustafa Çevirgen; (red card) 70' Oktay Kopan; (yellow card) 75' Ferit Kaya; (yellow card) 87' Yalçın Günay	Referee: Sebahattin Bitirim

5 October 1997 Round 7	Mersin İdmanyurdu	0–0	Konyaspor	Tevfik Sırrı Gür Stadium, Mersin
Sunday, 15:00	Kemal Yardımcı (yellow card) 34'; Mustafa Çevirgen (yellow card) 55'	Report	(yellow card) 53' Mustafa Katip; (yellow card) 67' Ozan Köprülü; (yellow card) 82' Mehmet Can	Referee: Ahmet İbanoğlu

12 October 1997 Round 8	Adanaspor	3–0	Mersin İdmanyurdu	5 Ocak Stadium, Adana
Sunday, 19:00	Hamdi Demirtaş 31' (F); Altan Aksoy 40' (F); Sertan Eser 65' (F); Kamil Ustaömer (yellow card) 60'; Emrah Eren (yellow card) 62'; Sertan Eser (yellow card) 71'	Report	(yellow card) 21' Mehmet Özer; (yellow card) 33' Kemal Yardımcı; (yellow card) 42' Ümit Aktaş; (yellow card) 87' Ferit Kaya	Referee: Ali Koraş

19 October 1997 Round 9	Mersin İdmanyurdu	5–1	Kemerspor	Tevfik Sırrı Gür Stadium, Mersin
Sunday, 15:00	Hakan Kayalar 43' (pen.); Fazlı Ulusoy 54' (F); Hüseyin Gün 58' (F); Önal Arıca 61' (F); Hakan Kayalar 85' (F); Okan Kopan (yellow card) 23'; Ümit Aktaş (yellow card) 58'; Hakan Kayalar (red card) 89'	Report	21' (F) Uğur Aksu; (yellow card) 44' Mehmet Çeker	Referee: İsmet Arzuman

26 October 1997 Round 10	Mersin İdmanyurdu	0–1	Bakırköyspor	Tevfik Sırrı Gür Stadium, Mersin
Sunday, 13:30	Türkay Başaran (yellow card) 8'; Gökhan Sakar (yellow card) 44'; İbrahim Durmuşlu (red card) 58'	Report	75' (F) Engin Çalışkan; (yellow card) 21' Kasım Çıkla; (yellow card) 66' Hakan Saral; (yellow card) 67' Engin Çalışkan	Referee: Sebahattin Şahin

2 November 1997 Round 11	Gaziosmanpaşaspor	2–1	Mersin İdmanyurdu	GOP Stadium, G.o.paşa, Istanbul
Sunday, 14:00	Güngör Öztürk 60' (F); Taner Ertaş 62' (F); Canel Çalışkan (yellow card) 22'; Nezih Balcı (yellow card) 36'; Alpaslan Kartal (yellow card) 84'; Ümit Karabaş (yellow card) 89'	Report	89' (F) Yalçın Günay; (yellow card) 34' Recep Yavaş; (yellow card) 42' Ferit Kaya; (red card) 60' Hakan Kayalar; (yellow card) 72' Mustafa Çevirgen; (red card) 83' Gökhan Sakar; (yellow card) 87' Bülent Kapıcı	Referee: Hakan Özkan

9 November 1997 Round 12	Mersin İdmanyurdu	5–2	Boluspor	Tevfik Sırrı Gür Stadium, Mersin
Sunday, 13:30	Fazlı Ulusoy 31' (F); Fazlı Ulusoy 44' (F); Murat Erdoğan 68' (F); Murat Erdoğan 76' (F); Murat Erdoğan 80' (F); Bülent Kapıcı (yellow card) 18'; Mustafa Çevirgen (yellow card) 44'; Yalçın Günay (yellow card) 51'	Report	5' (F) Cüneyt Karakuş; 19' (F) Cüneyt Karakuş; (yellow card) 31' Cüneyt Karakuş; (yellow card) 55' Muhsin Sezer; (yellow card) 72' Targan Seymen; (yellow card) 78' Salih Yorulmaz; (yellow card) 83' Atilla Ermen	Referee: Nihat Doker

16 November 1997 Round 13	Hatayspor	1–1	Mersin İdmanyurdu	Atatürk Stadium, Antakya, Hatay
Sunday, 13:30	Yunus Altun 89' (F); Zafer Uysal (red card) 73'; Hakan Özyay (yellow card) 86'; Yusuf Işık (yellow card) 89'	Report	27' (F) Hakan Kayalar; (red card) 73' Önal Arıca	Referee: Metin Çakarel

23 November 1997 Round 14	İstanbul BŞB	0–0	Mersin İdmanyurdu	Ç. Emeç Stadium, B.paşa, Istanbul
Sunday, 14:00	Ufuk Çam (yellow card) 21'; İsmail Demirci (yellow card) 34'; Telat Özden (yellow card) 71'; Sinan Demircioğlu (yellow card) 89'	Report	(yellow card) 58' İbrahim Durmuşlu; (yellow card) 87' Okan Kopan	Referee: Ahmet İbanoğlu

29 November 1997 Round 15	Mersin İdmanyurdu	1–1	Sarıyer	Tevfik Sırrı Gür Stadium, Mersin
Saturday, 13:30	Ferit Kaya 3' (F); Mehmet Özer (yellow card) 84'	Report	82' (F) Ersel Uzgur; (yellow card) 37' Osman Cengiz Güzeltepe; (yellow card) 40' Ersel Uzgur; (yellow card) 76' Ender Özinç	Referee: Bülent Akkaşlı

7 December 1997 Round 16	Konyaspor	1–1	Mersin İdmanyurdu	Atatürk Stadium, Konya
Sunday, 13:30	Suvat Karadağ 50' (F)	Report	41' (F) Fazlı Ulusoy; (yellow card) 79' Yalçın Günay	Referee: Namık Orhan

14 December 1997 Round 17	Mersin İdmanyurdu	2–1	Adanaspor	Tevfik Sırrı Gür Stadium, Mersin
Sunday, 13:30	Hakan Kayalar 2' (F); Hakan Kayalar 41' (pen.); Bülent Kapıcı (yellow card) 75'	Report	37' (F) Hayati Şen; (yellow card) 1' Mehmet Öğüt; (yellow card) 28' Murat Özdemir; (yellow card) 44' Candan Sayın; (yellow card) 70' Hayati Şen; (yellow card) 85' Emrah Eren

21 December 1997 Round 18	Kemerspor	2–1	Mersin İdmanyurdu	City Stadium, Kemer, Antalya
Sunday, 13:30	Hakan Şimşek 25' (F); Tufan Devrim Zengin 41' (F); İhsan Tanrıverdi (yellow card) 85'; Hakan Şimşek (yellow card) 88'	Report	31' (F) Hakan Kayalar; (yellow card) 32' Recep Yavaş; (yellow card) 89' Önal Arıca	Referee: Satılmış Kavacıklı

Sources: 1997–98 Turkish Second Football League pages.

=== Classification Group ===
Classification group 1 was played with 8 teams remaining after top two of ranking group were promoted to promotion group. Top team in the group promoted to promotion play-offs, while bottom two teams relegated to 1997–98 Third League season. Points and goals were carried from ranking group. MİY obtained 5 wins, 3 draws and 6 losses and finished sixth. Mersin İY's league performance in Second League Classification Group 1 in 1997–98 season is shown in the following table.

Pc	Team	Games				Goals		Pts	Home			Away		
Pc	Team	Pl	W	D	L	F	A	Pts	F–A	R	Pc	F–A	R	Pc
1	İstanbul Büyükşehir Belediyespor (Q)	32	16	8	8	58	44	56	1–2	10	4	3–4	3	5
2	Konyaspor	32	14	11	7	51	29	53	1–1	13	5	1–1	6	6
3	Hatayspor	32	12	7	13	35	40	43	1–0	12	4	0–1	5	5
4	Boluspor	32	10	10	12	37	42	40	1–0	8	4	0–1	1	6
5	Bakırköyspor	32	11	6	15	44	58	39	2–0	4	5	2–3	11	6
6	Mersin İdmanyurdu	32	9	11	12	44	43	38						
7	Kemerspor (R)	32	9	7	16	38	60	34	2–1	2	5	1–1	9	4
8	Gaziosmanpaşaspor (R)	32	5	12	15	32	49	27	3–0	7	4	0–2	14	6

Three points for a win. Rules for classification: 1) points; 2) tie-break; 3) goal difference; 4) number of goals scored. In the score columns first scores belong to MİY.
(Q): Qualified to 1997–98 Second League Promotion Play-offs; (R): Relegated to 1998–99 Turkish Third Football League.
Source: 1997–98 Turkish Second Football League pages from TFF website, Turkish-Soccer website, and Maçkolik website.

=== Classification group games ===
Mersin İdmanyurdu (MİY) 1997–98 Second League season first half game reports in Classification Group 1 is shown in the following table. Kick off times are in EET and EEST.

15 February 1998 Round 1	Boluspor	1–0	Mersin İdmanyurdu	City Stadium, Bolu
Sunday, 13:30	Cüneyt Karakuş 56' (F); Targan Seymen (yellow card) 70'	Report	(yellow card) 63' Önal Arıca	Referee: Metin Seval

22 February 1998 Round 2	Mersin İdmanyurdu	2–1	Kemerspor	Tevfik Sırrı Gür Stadium, Mersin
Sunday, 13:30	Recep Yavaş 29' (F); Fazlı Ulusoy 87' (F); Hakan Kayalar (yellow card) 10'	Report	64' (F) Ercan Erkavas; (yellow card) 14' Ramazan Kafes; (yellow card) 22' Ramazan Özen; (yellow card) 39' Hakan Şimşek; (yellow card) 41' Tevfik Hakan Alkan; (yellow card) 80' Reşat Yılmaz	Referee: Habeşi Bilal Kutlu

1 March 1998 Round 3	İstanbul BŞB	4–3	Mersin İdmanyurdu	Ç. Emeç Stadium, B.paşa, Istanbul
Sunday, 13:30	Haluk Kulaçoğlu 9' (F); Telat Özden 67' (F); Ebubekir Keskin 87' (F); İsmail Demirci 89' (F); Murat Karakale (yellow card) 28'; Mustafa Sarıgül (yellow card) 39'; İsmail Demirci (yellow card) 61'; Şükrü Sebat (yellow card) 73'	Report	20' (F) Arap Öztürk; 50' (F) Fazlı Ulusoy; 59' (F) Murat Erdoğan; (yellow card) 61' Önal Arıca; (yellow card) 68' Murat Erdoğan	Referee: Kazım Erçakır

8 March 1998 Round 4	Mersin İdmanyurdu	2–0	Bakırköyspor	Tevfik Sırrı Gür Stadium, Mersin
Sunday, 13:30	Hakan Kayalar 21' (pen.); Bülent Kapıcı 86' (F); İbrahim Durmuşlu (yellow card) 14'; Hakan Kayalar (yellow card) 43'; Türkay Başaran (yellow card) 52'; Bülent Kapıcı (yellow card) 76'; Yalçın Günay (yellow card) 85'; Okan Kopan (yellow card) 88'	Report	(yellow card) 20' Ercüment Eren	Referee: Cem Tosyalı

15 March 1998 Round 5	Hatayspor	1–0	Mersin İdmanyurdu	Atatürk Stadium, Antakya, Hatay
Sunday, 13:30	Yunus Altun 69' (F); Bülent Görgün (red card) 78'; Zafer Uysal (red card) 89'	Report	(yellow card) 58' İbrahim Durmuşlu; (yellow card) 59' Arap Öztürk	Referee: Nurettin Saka

22 March 1998 Round 6	Konyaspor	1–1	Mersin İdmanyurdu	Atatürk Stadium, Konya
Sunday, 13:30	Suvat Karadağ 11' (F); İsa Dündar (yellow card) 19'; Ozan Köprülü (yellow card) 26'; Erdoğan Genç (yellow card) 74'; Mustafa Göztok (yellow card) 85'	Report	24' (F) Recep Yavaş; (yellow card) 9' Ferit Kaya; (yellow card) 26' Mustafa Çevirgen; (yellow card) 57' Bülent Kapıcı; (yellow card) 64' Gökhan Sakar; (yellow card) 76' Yalçın Günay	Referee: İsmet Arzuman

28 March 1998 Round 7	Mersin İdmanyurdu	3–0	Gaziosmanpaşaspor	Tevfik Sırrı Gür Stadium, Mersin
Saturday, 14:30	Arap Öztürk 2' (F); Hakan Kayalar 36' (F); Fazlı Ulusoy 84' (F); Arap Öztürk (yellow card) 42'	Report	(yellow card) 27' Adem Mandıralı; (yellow card) 43' Güngör Öztürk; (yellow card) 57' Ahmet Cemalettin Cengiz; (yellow card) 60' Doğan Pek; (yellow card) 77' Alpaslan Kartal; (red card) 88' Tolga Yüksek	Referee: Habeşi Bilal Kutlu

5 April 1998 Round 8	Mersin İdmanyurdu	1–0	Boluspor	Tevfik Sırrı Gür Stadium, Mersin
Sunday, 14:30	Murat Erdoğan 89' (pen.); Yalçın Günay (yellow card) 78'; Murat Erdoğan (yellow card) 89'; Bülent Tarık Kapıcı (red card) 89'	Report	(yellow card) 58' Bülent Karakuş; (yellow card) 89' Muhsin Sezer; (red card) 89' Targan Seymen	Referee: Sebahattin Şahin

12 April 1998 Round 9	Kemerspor	1–1	Mersin İdmanyurdu	City Stadium, Kemer, Antalya
Sunday, 14:30	Yusuf Ünal 82' (F); Uğur Aksu (yellow card) 68'; Hakan Şimşek (yellow card) 88'	Report	74' (F) Arap Öztürk	Referee: Mustafa Arslan

19 April 1998 Round 10	Mersin İdmanyurdu	1–2	İstanbul BŞB	Tevfik Sırrı Gür Stadium, Mersin
Sunday, 15:30	Gökhan Sakar 80' (F); İbrahim Durmuşlu (yellow card) 87'	Report	10' (F) Bünyamin Kubat; 49' (F) Zafer Turan; (yellow card) 2' Fevzi Korkmaz; (yellow card) 4' Ayhan Alemdaroğlu; (yellow card) 75' Halit Köprülü	Referee: Şahin Taşkınsoy

26 April 1998 Round 11	Bakırköyspor	3–2	Mersin İdmanyurdu	Şenlikköy Std., Bakırköy, Istanbul
Sunday, 15:30	Engin Çalışkan 27' (F); Gökmen Özcan 43' (pen.); Kasım Çıkla 88' (F); Erol Gündoğdu (yellow card) 30'; Ahmet Kilimcioğlu (yellow card) 89'	Report	35' (F) Gökhan Sakar; 78' (F) Ferit Kaya; (yellow card) 32' Gökhan Sakar	Referee: Fikret Akay

3 May 1998 Round 12	Mersin İdmanyurdu	1–0	Hatayspor	Tevfik Sırrı Gür Stadium, Mersin
Sunday, 15:30	Recep Yavaş 43' (F); Gökhan Sakar (yellow card) 58'; Yalçın Günay (yellow card) 88'	Report	(yellow card) 69' Ahmet Taşyürek; (yellow card) 77' Murat Karaalioğlu	Referee: Sebahattin Şahin

10 May 1998 Round 13	Mersin İdmanyurdu	1–1	Konyaspor	Tevfik Sırrı Gür Stadium, Mersin
Sunday, 15:30	Murat Şaş 47' (F); Bülent Kapıcı (yellow card) 40'	Report	44' (F) Suvat Karadağ; (yellow card) 22' Bülent Okyaz; (yellow card) 41' Yunus Emre Ülker; (yellow card) 76' Erdoğan Genç; (yellow card) 90' Mustafa Göztok	Referee: Ali Koraş

16 May 1998 Round 14	Gaziosmanpaşaspor	2–0	Mersin İdmanyurdu	GOP Stadium, G.o.paşa, Istanbul
Saturday, 15:30	Alpaslan Kartal 40' (F); Salim Ayan 80' (F); Sinan Közen (yellow card) 16'	Report		Referee: Şerif Dursun

Sources: 1997–98 Turkish Second Football League pages.

== 1997–98 Turkish Cup participation ==
1997–98 Turkish Cup was played by 83 teams in 6 rounds prior to quarterfinals. First five round were played in one-leg elimination system, starting from 6th round two leg elimination rounds were played. [Mersin İdmanyurdu] had participated in 36th Turkish Cup (played as Türkiye Kupası in 1997–98 from Round 2 and eliminated at Round 4. The opponents were from Second League like MİY. MİY attended to the cup starting from second round. In the second round MİY eliminated their historical rivals Adana Demirspor which took place in 2nd League Group 2 in that season. In the third round the opponents were Group 2 runners-up Eskişehirspor. Hatayspor was the team to which MİY lost in 4th round. Beşiktaş won the cup for the 5th time.

=== Cup track ===
The drawings and results Mersin İdmanyurdu (MİY) followed in 1997–98 Turkish Cup are shown in the following table.

Round	Own League	Opponent's League	Opponent	A/H	Score	Result
Round 2	Second League	Second League	Adana Demirspor	H	1–0	Promoted to R3
Round 3	Second League	Second League	Eskişehirspor	H	1–0	Promoted to R4
Round 4	Second League	Second League	Hatayspor	H	1–3	Eliminated

Note: In the above table 'Score' shows For and Against goals whether the match played at home or not.

=== Game details ===
Mersin İdmanyurdu (MİY) 1997–98 Turkish Cup game reports is shown in the following table. Kick off times are in EET and EEST.

1 October 1997 Round 2	Mersin İdmanyurdu	1–0	Adana Demirspor	Tevfik Sırrı Gür Stadium, Mersin
Wednesday, 14:00	Fazlı Ulusoy 75' (F)	Report	(yellow card) 54' Koray Çevik; (yellow card) 59' Levent Güngör	Referee: Rahim Onar

15 October 1997 Round 3	Mersin İdmanyurdu	1–0 (a.e.t.)	Eskişehirspor	Tevfik Sırrı Gür Stadium, Mersin
Wednesday, 14:00	Kemal Yardımcı 110' (pen.); Önal Arıca (yellow card) 76'	Report	(yellow card) 103' Riyaz Murat Özduran	Referee: Selçuk Yılmaz

29 October 1997 Round 4	Mersin İdmanyurdu	1–3	Hatayspor	Tevfik Sırrı Gür Stadium, Mersin
Wednesday, 13:00	Bülent Kapıcı 38' (F); Serkan Uçak (yellow card) 89'	Report	11' (F) Cavit Öğrüce; 73' (F) Yunus Altun; 82' (F) Mustafa Hakan Şimşek	Referee: Namık Orhan

Source: 1997–98 Turkish Cup pages.

== Management ==
=== Club management ===
H. Okan Merzeci, mayor of Mersin city was president of the club. However, on 20 October 1997 Merzeci died due to cerebral hemorrhage. Halil Kuriş acted as mayor while municipality official Mehmet Küver became president of the club.

=== Coaching team ===
Zafer Bilgetay was head coach at the start of the season. After presidential change, when 10the round was lost and team was eliminated from the cup, Kasım Gündüz who coached the team in previous season as well, took over the team. Zafer Göncüler came to the position before the start of the second stage and completed the season.

1997–98 Mersin İdmanyurdu head coaches:

Nat	Head coach	Period	Pl	W	D	L	Notes
(Turkey)	Zafer Bilgetay	03.07.1997 – 18.09.1997	4	1	1	2	Left after 4th round of first stage.
		20.09.1997 – 29.10.1997	9	3	2	4	
(Turkey)	Kasım Gündüz	30.10.1997 – 12.02.1998	8	2	4	2	Left in the mid-season.
(Turkey)	Zafer Göncüler	12.02.1998 – 31.05.1998	14	5	3	6	Contract ended at the end of the season.

Note: Only official games were included.

== 1997–98 squad ==
Appearances, goals and cards count for 1997–98 Second League Group 1 matches and 1997–98 Turkish Cup (Türkiye Kupası) matches only. Starting from this season, the number of players in roster were increased to 18; of the 7 substitutes 3 were eligible to be replaced. Players who only appeared in game rosters were included and listed in order of appearance.

O	N	Nat	Name	Birth	Born	Pos	LA	LG	CA	CG	TA	TG	Booked	Sent off (straight red)	← Season Notes →
1	1	(Turkey)	Varol Özhan	20 Jan 1968	İzmir	GK	4				4				1997 ST Altay.
2	2	(Turkey)	Bülent Kapıcı	29 Aug 1973	Istanbul	DF	25	1	1	1	26	2	8	1	→ previous season.
3	3	(Turkey)	Türkay Başaran	20 Sep 1966	Çanakkale	DF	31		1		32		2		→ previous season.
4	4	(Turkey)	Mustafa Çevirgen	12 Feb 1973	Adana	DF	20		1		21		5		→ previous season.
5	5	(Turkey)	Hakan Turgut	4 Dec 1968	Mersin	DF	12				12		2		→ previous season.
6	6	(Turkey)	Mehmet Özer	3 Sep 1971	Siirt	MF	21	1	1		22	1	2	2	1997 ST Erzurumspor.
7	7	(Turkey)	Recep Yavaş	11 Aug 1972	Adapazarı	MF	27	6	1		28	6	2		1997 ST Akçakocaspor.
8	8	(Turkey)	Gökhan Sakar	7 Apr 1975	Osmaniye	MF	28	2	2		30	2	4	1	1997 ST Ankaragücü.
9	9	(Turkey)	Hakan Kayalar	13 Apr 1970	İzmir	FW	30	10	1		31	10	2	2	1997 ST Altay.
10	10	(Turkey)	Hüseyin Gün	1 Jan 1975	İzmir	MF	11	2	1		12	2	2		1997 ST Aydınspor.
11	11	(Turkey)	Kemal Yardımcı	1 Jan 1972	Şanlıurfa	FW	9	2	1	1	10	3	3		→ previous season.
12	12	(Turkey)	Okan Kopan	19 Oct 1976	Zonguldak	GK	19				19		3	1	→ previous season.
13	13	(Turkey)	Önal Arıca	23 Feb 1976	Mersin	DF	25	1	3		28	1	6	1	→ previous season.
14	14	(Turkey)	Murat Şaş	19 May 1977	Gaziantep	FW	8	1	3		11	1			→ previous season.
15	15	(Turkey)	Fazlı Ulusoy	18 Mar 1975	Istanbul	FW	29	8	2	1	31	9			→ previous season.
16	16	(Turkey)	Abdullah Akan	1 Feb 1970	Diyarbakır	DF	1				1				1997 ST Ceyhanspor.
17	17	(Turkey)	Yalçın Günay	2 Jun 1974	Bayburt	MF	26	1	3		29	1	7		→ previous season.
18	18	(Turkey)	Serkan Uçak	23 July 1977	Mersin	FW	7		2		9		1		→ previous season.
19	16	(Turkey)	Ümit Aktaş	12 Jul 1968	Mersin	MF	19		2		21		2		1997 ST Diyarbakırspor.
20	17	(Turkey)	Aydın Yetgin	5 June 1975	Rize	MF	2		3		5				1997 SL Altay.
21	12	(Turkey)	Oğuzhan Doğar	1 Jun 1978	Osmaniye	GK	9		3		12				→ previous season.
22	18	(Turkey)	Murat Erdoğan	1 Aug 1976	London	MF	18	5	2		20	5	2		→ previous season.
23	18	(Turkey)	İbrahim Durmuşlu	22 May 1973	Silifke	DF	20		2		22		4	1	1997 ST Silifkespor.
24	15	(Turkey)	Ferit Kaya	2 Jan 1975	Afşin	MF	26	2	2		28	2	4		→ previous season.
25	12	(Turkey)	Volkan Barış Ercan	10 Sep 1980	Mersin	GK									Amateur player.
26	15	(Turkey)	Mevlüt Metli	17 Aug 1979	Mersin	MF			1		1				Amateur player.
27	16	(Turkey)	Selman Turan	11 Nov 1978	Mersin	DF			2		2				Amateur player.
28	17	(Turkey)	Eyyüp Özdemir	4 Jun 1983	Beytüşşebap	DF									Amateur player.
29	15	(Turkey)	Nurullah Saygılı	10 Sep 1976	Kiğı	FW	6				6				→ previous season.
30	18	(Turkey)	İnan Günal	4 Apr 1980	Tunceli	DF	3		1		4				First time professional.
31	17	(Turkey)	Turhan Aktarla	19 Nov 1974	Mersin	MF									1997 ST Alanyaspor.
32	16	(Turkey)	Arap Öztürk	15 May 1977	İzmir	FW	16	3			16	3	2		1998 WT Karşıyaka.
33	12	(Turkey)	Hakan Baygın	14 Aug 1969	Mersin	GK	1				1				1998 WT Ispartaspor.

Sources: TFF club page and maçkolik team page.

== See also ==
- Football in Turkey
- 1997–98 Turkish Second Football League
- 1997–98 Turkish Cup
