= Serkan =

Serkan is a Turkish male given name that means "noble blood" or "noble person". Notable people with the name include:

- Serkan Atak (born 1984), German footballer of Turkish descent
- Serkan Aykut (born 1975), Turkish footballer
- Serkan Balcı (born 1983), Turkish footballer
- Serkan Çalik (born 1986), Turkish footballer
- Serkan Çeliköz (born 1975), Turkish musician
- Serkan Erdoğan (born 1978), Turkish basketball player
- Serkan İnan (born 1986), Swedish basketball player of Turkish descent
- Serkan Kaya (born 1984), Turkish marathon runner
- Serkan Kırıntılı (born 1985), Turkish footballer
- Serkan Köse (born 1976), Swedish politician
- Serkan Kurtuluş (born 1990), Turkish footballer
- Serkan Özdemir (born 1976), Turkish footballer
- Serkan Özkaya (born 1973), Turkish artist
- Serkan Özsoy (born 1978), Turkish footballer
- Serkan Şahin (born 1988), Turkish footballer
- Serkan Yıldık (born 1982), Turkish footballer
- Serkan Yıldırım (born 1991), Turkish para-athlete

== See also ==
- Serkan or Sarkan, a city in Hamadan Province, Iran
