= 1997–98 Turkish Cup =

Türkiye Kupası

Tournament details
- Country: Turkey
- Teams: 83

Final positions
- Champions: Beşiktaş
- Runners-up: Galatasaray

Tournament statistics
- Matches played: 97
- Goals scored: 320 (3.3 per match)
- Top goal scorer(s): Ertuğrul Sağlam; Hasan Çelik; Mutlu Dervişoğlu (5 goals each)

The 1997–98 Turkish Cup was the 36th edition of the tournament that determined the association football Süper Lig Turkish Cup (Turkish: Türkiye Kupası) champion under the auspices of the Turkish Football Federation (Turkish: Türkiye Futbol Federasyonu; TFF). champion under the auspices of the Turkish Football Federation (Turkish: Türkiye Futbol Federasyonu; TFF). Beşiktaş successfully contested Galatasaray on both legs of the finals. The results of the tournament also determined which clubs would be promoted or relegated.

== First round ==
Team 1	Score	Team 2
Gümüşhane Doğanspor	4–3	Ağrıspor
Petrol Ofisi	0–2	Askispor
Ispartaspor	2–1	Tarsus İdman Yurdu
İzmirspor	3–1	Uşakspor
Üsküdar Anadolu	4–2	Yalovaspor
Kırklarelispor	0–1	Keşanspor
Batman Belediyespor	3–4	Kilis Belediyespor

== Second round ==
Team 1	Score	Team 2
Şanlıurfaspor	2–1	Diyarbakırspor
Elazığspor	3–0	Siirt Köy Hiz.Yse Spor
Malatyaspor	0–2	Batman Petrolspor
Artvin Hopaspor	1–3	Erzurumspor
Çaykur Rizespor	0–0 (1–4 p)	Giresunspor
Gümüşhane Doğanspor	3–0	Erzincanspor
Sankospor	5–0	Kilis Belediyespor
Adıyamanspor	0–1	Hatayspor
Konyaspor	3–2 (aet)	Adanaspor
Mersin İdman Yurdu	1–0	Adana Demirspor
Çorumspor	1–1 (1–4 p)	Orduspor
Yeni Yozgatspor	0–6	Ankara B.B.
Zonguldakspor	3–2	Düzcespor
Boluspor	4–2	Keçiörengücü
Eskişehirspor	3–2 (aet)	Ankara Demirspor
Askispor	2–3	PTT
Ispartaspor	2–1	Yeni Afyonspor
Denizlispor	4–0	Kemerspor
Aydınspor	1–0 (aet)	Marmarisspor
Kuşadasıspor	0–1	İzmirspor
Karşıyaka	4–2	Yeni Salihlispor
Bucaspor	5–3	Soma Linyitspor
Yeni Turgutluspor	1–0	Göztepe
Bakırköy	4–1	Edirnespor
Keşanspor	2–0	Kasımpaşa
Gaziosmanpaşa	2–1	Zeytinburnu
Üsküdar Anadolu	2–3 (aet)	İstanbul B.B.
Kartalspor	2–1	Sakaryaspor
Beylerbeyi	0–1	Sarıyer

== Third round ==
Team 1	Score	Team 2
Hatayspor	3–1	Sankospor
Şanlıurfaspor	4–1 (aet)	Elazığspor
Erzurumspor	2–1	Giresunspor
Orduspor	1–3	Gümüşhane Doğanspor
Konyaspor	1–0	Ispartaspor
Mersin İdman Yurdu	1–0 (aet)	Eskişehirspor
PTT	2–4	Zonguldakspor
Ankara B.B.	3–1	Boluspor
Aydınspor	0–1	Karşıyaka
Bucaspor	2–0 (aet)	Yeni Turgutluspor
İzmirspor	2–5	Denizlispor
İstanbul B.B.	4–1	Keşanspor
Kartalspor	3–0	Sarıyer
Bakırköy	1–2	Gaziosmanpaşa

== Fourth round ==
Team 1	Score	Team 2
Batman Petrolspor	1–2 (aet)	Şanlıurfaspor
Gümüşhane Doğanspor	3–3 (5–3 p)	Erzurumspor
Mersin İdman Yurdu	1–3	Hatayspor
Kayserispor	0–4	Şekerspor
Ankara B.B.	0–3	Karabükspor
Denizlispor	5–1	Karşıyaka
Bucaspor	1–0	Konyaspor
Zonguldakspor	0–1	Kartalspor
Gaziosmanpaşa	0–2	İstanbul B.B.

== Fifth round ==
Team 1	Score	Team 2
Gençlerbirliği	3–0	Samsunspor
Ankaragücü	4–3 (aet)	Denizlispor
Karabükspor	4–0	Bucaspor
Hatayspor	2–3	Altay
Şanlıurfaspor	0–1	Vanspor
Kartalspor	1–2	Gümüşhane Doğanspor
Şekerspor	2–2 (3–1 p)	İstanbul B.B.
Antalyaspor	4–1 (aet)	Çanakkale Dardanelspor

== Sixth round ==
Team 1	Agg.	Team 2	1st leg	2nd leg
Gümüşhane Doğanspor	1–5	Kocaelispor	1–1	0–4
Karabükspor	2–3	Bursaspor	2–1	0–2
Antalyaspor	1–4	Fenerbahçe	1–3	0–1
Şekerspor	0–5	Trabzonspor	0–2	0–3
Beşiktaş	8–4	Gençlerbirliği	3–3	5–1
Gaziantepspor	3–1	Ankaragücü	2–1	1–0
Galatasaray	2–1	Vanspor	2–1	0–0
İstanbulspor	4–2	Altay	3–0	1–2

== Quarter-finals ==
Team 1	Agg.	Team 2	1st leg	2nd leg
Beşiktaş	4–0	İstanbulspor	2–0	2–0
Bursaspor	2–3	Kocaelispor	1–2	1–1
Fenerbahçe	2–4	Trabzonspor	2–1	0–3^{1}
Galatasaray	2–1	Gaziantepspor	2–0	0–1

- ^{1}While Trabzonspor was leading 1–0, Fenerbahçe leave the field in the 75th minute on the ground that a stone hit the back of Fenerbahçe coach Otto Barić and the match could not be completed. The result was registered as 3–0 in favor of Trabzonspor and Fenerbahçe was given a one-season ban from the cup.

== Semi-finals ==
=== Summary table ===
Team 1	Agg.	Team 2	1st leg	2nd leg
Trabzonspor	2–4	Galatasaray	0–0	2–4
Kocaelispor	1–5	Beşiktaş	0–1	1–4

=== 1st leg ===
25 February 1998 Semi-final	Trabzonspor	0–0	Galatasaray	Trabzon
19:00 EET (UTC+02)				Stadium: Hüseyin Avni Aker Stadium; Referee: Kadir Tozlu

25 February 1998 Semi-final	Kocaelispor	0–1	Beşiktaş	Kocaeli
21:00 EET (UTC+02)			Yusuf 27'	Stadium: İsmetpaşa Stadium; Referee: Murat Ilgaz

=== 2nd leg ===
10 March 1998 Semi-final	Beşiktaş	4–1 (a.e.t.)	Kocaelispor	Istanbul
19:00 EET (UTC+02)	Rahim 96'; Oktay 97'; Nihat 113'; Amokachi 120'		Tarik 8'	Stadium: BJK İnönü Stadium; Referee: Bülent Uzun

11 March 1998 Semi-final	Galatasaray	4–2	Trabzonspor	Istanbul
19:00 EET (UTC+02)	Popescu 38' (pen.); Arif 49'; Hakan 61'; Suat 87'		Hami 11', 22'	Stadium: Ali Sami Yen Stadium; Referee: Sadık İlhan

== Final ==
=== 1st leg ===
25 March 1998 Final	Beşiktaş	1–1	Galatasaray	Istanbul, Turkey
20:30 EET (UTC+02)	Ertuğrul 85'		Okan 61'	Stadium: BJK İnönü Stadium; Referee: Orhan Erdemir

=== 2nd leg ===
8 April 1998 Final	Galatasaray	1–1 (2–4 p)	Beşiktaş	Istanbul, Turkey
19:00 EEST (UTC+03)	Arif 71'		Mehmet 44'	Stadium: Ali Sami Yen Stadium; Referee: Erol Ersoy
	Penalties
	Hagi (penalty missed); Popescu (penalty scored); Osman (penalty missed); Arif (penalty scored)		(penalty scored) Ertuğrul; (penalty scored) Mehmet; (penalty scored) Amokachi; (penalty scored) Tayfur

== See also ==
- 1997–98 1.Lig
