= Michael Kraft =

German footballer (born 1966)

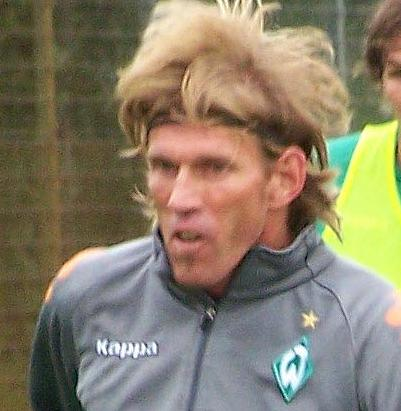
- Kraft at practice with Werder Bremen in 2006

Personal information
- Full name: Michael Willi Kraft
- Date of birth: 23 April 1966 (age 60)
- Place of birth: Dernbach, West Germany
- Position: Goalkeeper

Team information
- Current team: Cambodia (goalkeeping coach)

Youth career
- 1972–1984: SpVgg Wirges

Senior career*
Years	Team	Apps	(Gls)
1984–1988	SpVgg Wirges		
1988–1990	1. FC Köln	1	(0)
1990–1993	Bakırköyspor	81	(0)
1993–1998	1. FC Köln	26	(0)
1998–1999	FC Gütersloh	17	(0)
2000–2001	Carl Zeiss Jena	1	(0)

Managerial career
- 2000–2001: Carl Zeiss Jena (player coach)
- 2002–2003: Rot Weiss Ahlen
- 2003: Bucheon SK (goalkeeping coach)
- 2004: Incheon United (goalkeeping coach)
- 2005: Preußen Münster (assistant)
- 2006–2013: Werder Bremen (goalkeeping coach)
- 2014–2015: Eintracht Frankfurt (goalkeeping coach)
- 2017–2020: Beijing Sinobo Guoan (goalkeeping coach)
- 2020–2021: Fenerbahçe (goalkeeping coach)
- 2023–2024: Viktoria Köln (goalkeeping coach)
- 2024: Al-Wehda (goalkeeping coach)
- 2026–: Cambodia (goalkeeping coach)
- * Club domestic league appearances and goals

Michael Willi Kraft (born 23 April 1966) is a German former professional footballer who played as a goalkeeper. He played for 1. FC Köln, FC Gütersloh and FC Carl Zeiss Jena in Germany and Bakırköyspor in the Süper Lig and is currently the goalkeeping coach of Cambodia.
