= Orkun Usak =

Turkish footballer

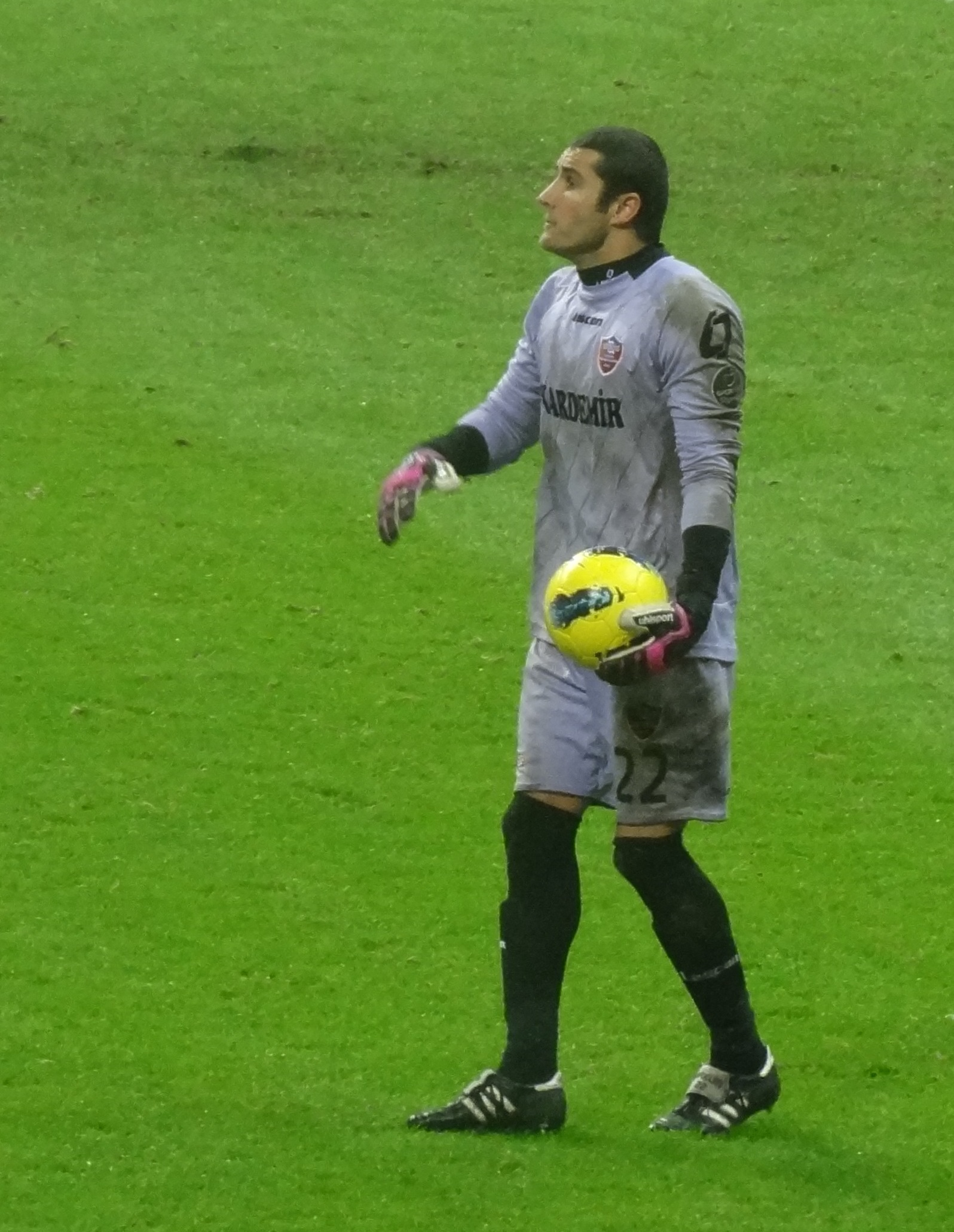

Personal information
- Date of birth: November 5, 1980 (age 45)
- Place of birth: Istanbul, Turkey
- Height: 1.83 m (6 ft 0 in)
- Position: Goalkeeper

Team information
- Current team: Mersin İdmanyurdu
- Number: 54

Youth career
- 1997–1998: Galatasaray A2

Senior career*
Years	Team	Apps	(Gls)
1998–1999	Beykozspor	11	(0)
1999–2000	Bakırköyspor	24	(0)
2000–2001	Anadolu Üsküdar 1908	20	(0)
2001–2003	Elazigspor	53	(0)
2003–2006	MKE Ankaragücü	51	(0)
2006–2007	Kayseri Erciyesspor	16	(0)
2007–2009	Galatasaray	23	(0)
2009–2010	Manisaspor	4	(0)
2010–2011	Konyaspor	5	(0)
2011–2012	Karabükspor	9	(0)
2012	Antalyaspor	7	(0)
2012–2013	Mersin İdmanyurdu	10	(0)
2013–	Adana Demirspor	0	(0)

International career
2006	Turkey	1	(0)
- * Club domestic league appearances and goals

Orkun Usak (born November 5, 1980) is a Turkish football goalkeeper who currently plays for Mersin İdmanyurdu SK. He is a product of the youth system of Galatasaray. He also played for Beykozspor, Bakırköyspor, Anadolu Üsküdar, Elazığspor, Ankaragücü, Kayseri Erciyesspor, Galatasaray, Manisaspor, Konyaspor and Kardemir Karabükspor. On 1 February 2012, he joined Antalyaspor for the rest of the season.

== Career ==
=== Club career ===
He signed a three-year contract with the Turkish club on the 20th of June 2007. His spectacular performance with his previous team enabled him to obtain a place in the international squad. Before coming to Galatasaray, he played 16 games for Kayseri Erciyesspor and received 10 goals.

=== International career ===
He has one cap to his account.

== Honours ==
Galatasaray

- Süper Lig: 2007–08
- Turkish Super Cup: 2008
