= Serkan Yıldık =

Turkish footballer

Serkan Yıldık (born 23 September 1982) is a Turkish former professional footballer who played as a midfielder.

He formerly played for Erzurumspor, Erzincanspor, Gaziosmanpaşaspor and Göztepe. Yıldık appeared in seven Süper Lig matches for Erzurumspor between 1998 and 2001.
