= Ragıp Başdağ =

Turkish footballer (born 1978)

Personal information
- Full name: Ragıp Başdağ
- Date of birth: June 9, 1978 (age 48)
- Place of birth: Trabzon, Turkey
- Height: 1.78 m (5 ft 10 in)
- Position: Defensive midfielder

Team information
- Current team: A. Selcukspor

Senior career*
Years	Team	Apps	(Gls)
1997–2000	Trabzonspor	2	(0)
1998–1999	→ Orduspor (loan)	26	(1)
1999–2000	→ Mersin İdman Yurdu (loan)	15	(0)
2000–2003	Akçaabat Sebatspor	97	(16)
2003–2005	Sakaryaspor	63	(10)
2005–2009	Kayserispor	143	(8)
2009–2010	Eskişehirspor	20	(0)
2010–2011	Bucaspor	28	(1)
2011–2012	Denizlispor	32	(3)
2012–2013	Kayseri Erciyesspor	29	(1)
2013–2015	Ankaraspor	67	(4)
2015–2016	Balıkesirspor	30	(0)
2016––	A. Selcukspor	0	(0)
- * Club domestic league appearances and goals as of 12 May 2016

Ragıp Başdağ (born June 9, 1978, in Trabzon, Turkey) is a Turkish footballer. During the 2002–03 season, Ragip was suspended from football for six months after having failed a doping test. He currently plays for A. Selcukspor in the midfielder position.

== Career ==
Ragıp, is a product of Trabzonspor youth system. Ragip signed with Kayserispor for 4 years. In May 2009, he was released by Kayserispor, and subsequently joined Eskişehirspor for 2 years.

During the 2002–03 season, Ragip was suspended from football for six months after having failed a doping test.

== Honours ==
- Kayserispor
  - Turkish Cup (1): 2008
