= Zeytinburnu Stadium =

Football stadium in Istanbul

- Interactive map of Zeytinburnu Stadium
- Location: Zeytinburnu, Istanbul, Turkey Zeytinburnu Stadium (Istanbul)
- Coordinates: 40°59′38″N 28°54′43″E
- Owner: Zeytinburnu Municipality
- Operator: Zeytinburnu Municipality
- Capacity: 16,000 (uncovered)
- Surface: Grass (Natural)
- Field size: 103x68 m.
- Public transit: Kazlıçeşme

Tenants
- Zeytinburnuspor; İstanbulspor (short-term, in 2004)

Zeytinburnu Stadı (English: Zeytinburnu Stadium) is a football stadium, home ground of the Turkish Regional Amateur League team Zeytinburnuspor since 1984, located in Zeytinburnu, Istanbul. The stadium is an all-seater stadium and holds a total capacity of 16,000 people and is uncovered.

The stadium briefly housed the Turkish Third League team İstanbulspor A.Ş. in 2004.

The stadium is occasionally in use for public holiday ceremonies.
