= Murat Erdoğan =

English footballer

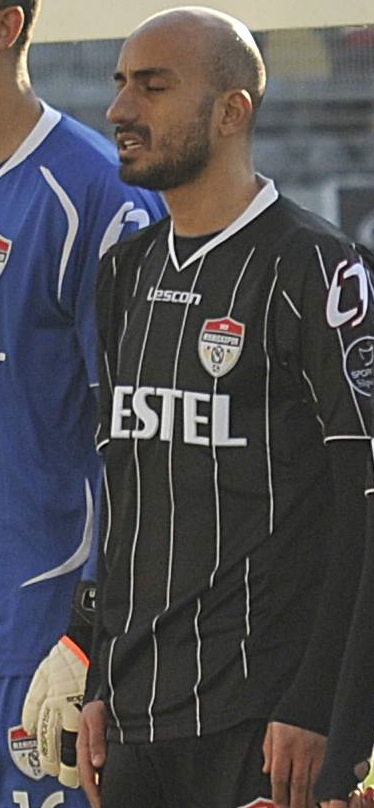

Personal information
- Date of birth: 1 August 1976 (age 50)
- Place of birth: London, England
- Height: 1.80 m (5 ft 11 in)
- Position: Midfielder

Senior career*
Years	Team	Apps	(Gls)
1997–1999	Mersin İdman Yurdu	51	(10)
1999–2002	Istanbulspor	87	(5)
2002–2003	Gaziantepspor	29	(0)
2003–2004	Galatasaray	17	(2)
2004–2005	Malatyaspor	33	(6)
2005–2006	Ankaraspor	28	(2)
2006–2007	Sakaryaspor	32	(2)
2007–2009	MKE Ankaragücü	30	(4)
2009	Sivasspor	15	(2)
2009–2010	Kasımpaşa	24	(3)
2010–2012	Manisaspor	58	(9)
2012–2013	Mersin İdman Yurdu	13	(0)
- * Club domestic league appearances and goals

Murat Erdoğan (born 1 August 1976) is an English-born Turkish former professional footballer and a businessperson.

== Playing career ==
Erdoğan was born in London, England. He played as a left-footed midfielder, scoring 48 goals in 410 professional appearances. After being spotted playing during a Sunday league game on Hackney Marshes in London, he was invited to play for Mersin İdman Yurdu. After a transfer to İstanbulspor, Erdoğan's career saw him play for Gaziantepspor, Galatasaray, Malatyaspor, Ankaraspor, Sakaryaspor, MKE Ankaragücü, Sivasspor, Kasımpaşa, and Manisaspor in the Turkish league. In September 2009, he moved to Kasımpaşa S.K. before returning to Mersin İdman Yurdu, where he ended his professional football career, playing for the team he first signed for sixteen years previously.

== Later career ==
Since 2018, Erdoğan has been the director of ME10 Football, an agency for professional footballers. He worked as sporting director for Konyaspor from 2015 to 2016 . Prior to that Erdoğan worked for Sivasspor as sporting director from June 2013 until February 2014.

== Personal ==
Erdoğan lives in Istanbul, Bodrum and London.

He still regularly plays football. and keeps fit.
