= List of mayors of Mersin =

The following list is the list of mayors of Mersin, Turkey after the proclamation of Turkish republic

== The mayors ==
| Period | Years | Mayor | Status of Mersin | Notes |
|---|---|---|---|---|
| Elected mayors | 1924-27 | Fuat Morel | Provincial center | |
| Elected mayors | 1927-29 | Şevket Sümer | Provincial center | |
| Elected mayors | 1929-42 | Mitat Toroğlu | Provincial center | |
| Elected mayors | 1942-44 | Hakkı Deniz | Provincial center | |
| Elected mayors | 1944-47 | Fuat Morel | Provincial center | |
| Elected mayors | 1947-50 | Yusuf Kılınç | Provincial center | |
| Elected mayors | 1950-51 | Müfide İlhan | Provincial center | First woman mayor of Turkey |
| Elected mayors | 1951-54 | Fahri Merzeci | Provincial center | |
| Elected mayors | 1954-57 | Zeki Ayan | Provincial center | |
| Elected mayors | 1957-57 | Turgut Türkalp | Provincial center | |
| Elected mayors | 1957-60 | Zeki Ayan | Provincial center | Second time |
| Military rule | 1960-60 | Niyazi Bengisu | Provincial center | Appointed |
| Military rule | 1960-60 | Avni Çırnaz | Provincial center | Appointed |
| Military rule | 1960-61 | Aziz Avman | Provincial center | Appointed |
| Military rule | 1962-62 | Bahri Erkmen | Provincial center | Appointed |
| Military rule | 1962-63 | Ömer Lütfi Hancıoğlu | Provincial center | Appointed |
| Elected mayors | 1963-68 | Zeki Ayan | Provincial center | Third time |
| Elected mayors | 1968-74 | Muhittin Uyar | Provincial center | |
| Elected mayors | 1974-80 | Kaya Mutlu | Provincial center | |
| Military rule | 1980-81 | Fahri Öztürk | Provincial center | Appointed |
| Military rule | 1980-81 | Ferruh Güven | Provincial center | Appointed |
| Military rule | 1982-83 | A. Nafiz Demiröz | Provincial center | Appointed |
| Elected mayors | 1983-89 | Okan Merzeci | Provincial center | |
| Elected mayors | 1989-94 | Kaya Mutlu | Provincial center | Second time |
| Elected mayors | 1994-97 | Okan Merzeci | Metropolitan center | Second time |
| Elected mayors | 1997-99 | Halil Kuriş | Metropolitan center | Acting |
| Elected mayors | 1999-2014 | Macit Özcan | Metropolitan center | |
| Elected mayors | 2014-2019 | Burhanettin Kocamaz | Metropolitan center | |
| Elected mayors | 2019-current | Vahap Seçer | Metropolitan center | |
