= Serkan Özdemir =

Turkish footballer

Personal information
- Full name: Serkan Özdemir
- Date of birth: May 14, 1976 (age 50)
- Place of birth: Istanbul, Turkey
- Height: 1.68 m (5 ft 6 in)
- Position: Midfielder

Senior career*
Years	Team	Apps	(Gls)
1996–1997	Lüleburgazspor	28	(7)
1997–2000	Sarıyer	89	(12)
2000–2006	Çaykur Rizespor	174	(14)
2006–2007	Samsunspor	14	(1)
2007	Diyarbakırspor	17	(0)
2007–2009	Eskişehirspor	25	(4)
2009–2011	Sarıyer	34	(0)
2012–2013	Lüleburgazspor	18	(2)
- * Club domestic league appearances and goals

Serkan Özdemir (born May 14, 1976) is a former Turkish football player.
