= Konya Atatürk Stadium =

Football stadium in Konya, Turkey

Coordinates: 37°51′55.40″N 32°28′59.80″E

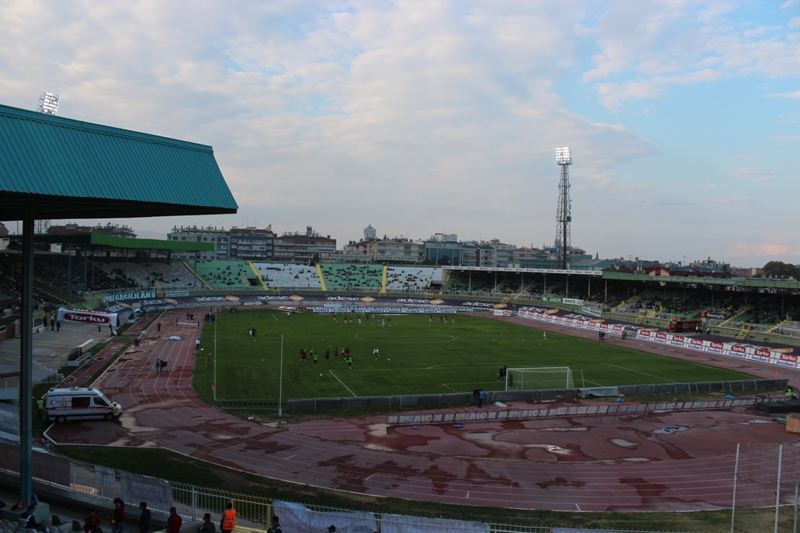
Konya Atatürk Stadium

Konya Atatürk Stadium (Turkish: Konya Atatürk Stadı) was a multi-purpose stadium in Konya, Turkey. It was used mostly for football matches and was the home ground of Konyaspor. The stadium held 22,559 people and was built in 1950 and the stadium was demolished in 2018.
