= Şenlikköy Stadium =

Football stadium in Istanbul, Turkey

Coordinates: 40°58′49″N 28°47′30″E

Şenlikköy Stadium (Turkish: Şenlikköy Stadı) is a small stadium in the Bakırköy district of Istanbul, Turkey.

It is the home stadium of the football club Bakırköyspor. The stadium has a capacity of 8000.
