= Zeytinburnuspor =

Association football club

Zeytinburnu S.K.
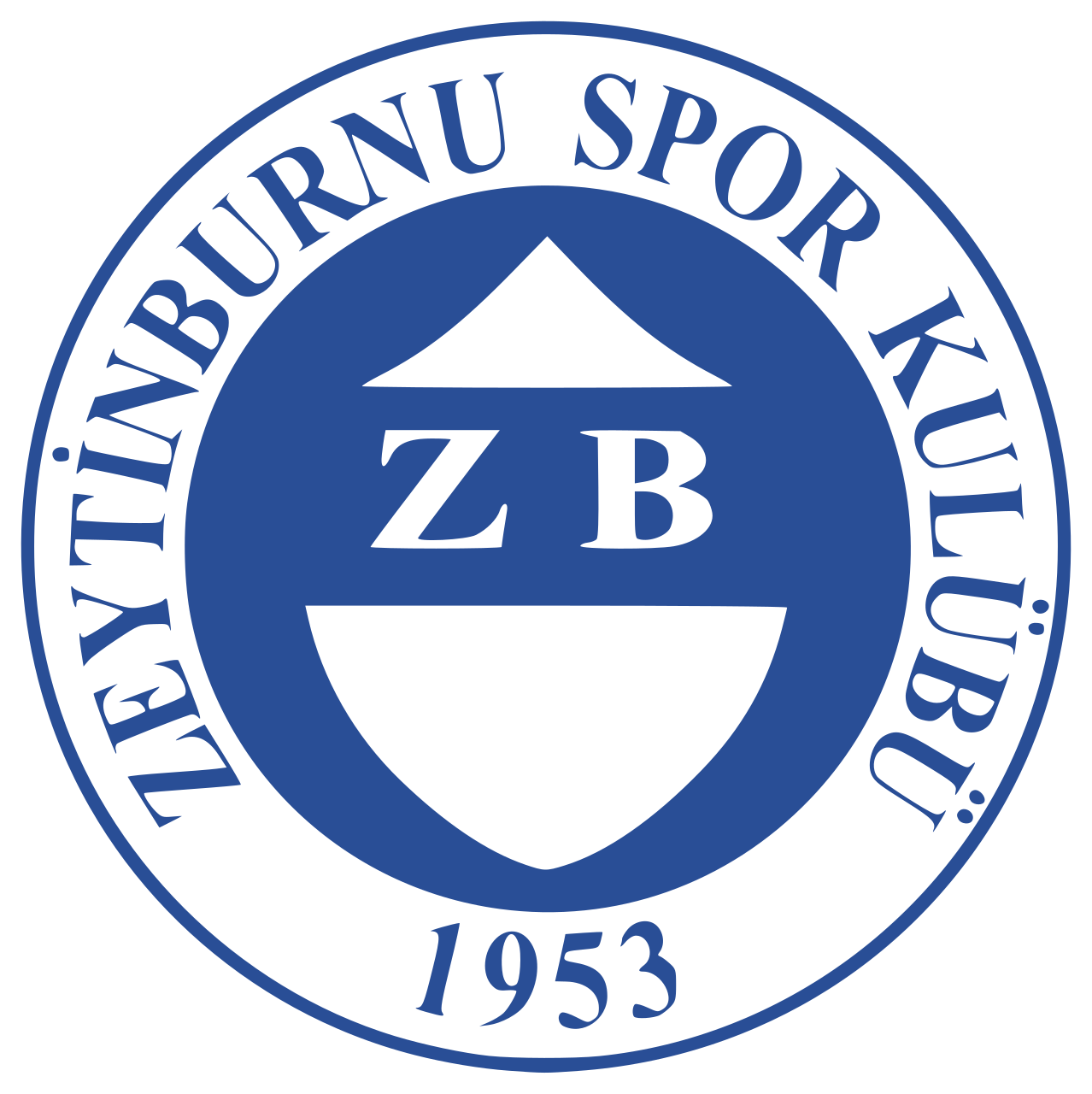
- Full name: Zeytinburnu Spor Kulubü
- Founded: 1953
- Ground: Zeytinburnu Stadium; Zeytinburnu, Istanbul
- Capacity: 17,500 (1500 seated)
- Chairman: Mehmet Salih Demirbaş
- Manager: Selçuk Yıldız
- League: Istanbul 1st Amateur League 6th Group
- 2022–23: Istanbul Super Amateur League 3rd Group, 9th (relegated)
Home colours	Away colours

Zeytinburnu SK is a Turkish football club established in 1953 and based in the Zeytinburnu district of Istanbul, Turkey.

They hold the record for worst performance in First League history during the 96/97 season, when they lost 27 matches out of 34, with 5 draws and only 2 wins. Their success percentage was 13.2%.

They played again in the First League between 1989 and 1991, 1993–1995 and 1996–1997.

Zeytinburnuspor competed in the Turkish Regional Amateur League 13th Group in the 2011–12 season. They were relegated from the Turkish Regional Amateur League to Istanbul Super Amateur League in the season, finishing 10th with 21 points and losing in the play-offs to Bağcılar.

Zeytinburnuspor played in the Istanbul First Amateur League after getting relegated from the Istanbul Super Amateur League in the 2012–13 season. After two seasons in the First Amateur League they returned to the Super Amateur League.

== League participations ==
- Turkish Super League: 1989–91, 1993–95, 1996–97
- TFF First League: 1987–89, 1991–93, 1995–96, 1997–00
- TFF Second League: 1984–87, 2000–02, 2006–10
- TFF Third League: 2002–06, 2010–11
- Turkish Regional Amateur League: 2011–12
- Amatör Futbol Ligleri: 2012–13, 2015–16, 2022–23
- Istanbul First Amateur League: 2013–15, 2016–18, 2020–22, 2023-
- Istanbul Second Amateur League: 2018–20,

== Women's Football Honours ==
Turkish Women's Football League

- Winners (1): 2001–02
- Runners-up (1): 2000-01
