= Macit Özcan =

Turkish politician

Macit Özcan (born 1954 in Karataş, Adana Province, Turkey) is a Turkish politician of the Republican People's Party (CHP) and a former mayor of Mersin.

After his secondary education in Adana, he graduated in civil engineering from Çukurova University. He went on to work as a civil engineer in the Ministry of Public Works and Housing. He has lived in Mersin since 1980.

He was elected Mayor of Mersin in 1999. He successfully stood for a third term in the March 2009 election. But in 2014 (partially because of the change in the election territory borders) he lost the elections. Özcan has been accused of being a "political octopus" and prone to corruption and dishonesty.

Committed to improving relations with his Arab neighbours, in 2006 Özcan launched a ferry service to the Syrian port of Latakia, which is one of Mersin's twin cities.

He is married with two children.
