= Bakırköyspor =

- Full name: Bakırköy Spor Kulübü
- Nickname: –
- Founded: 1949
- Ground: Şenlikköy Stadium, Istanbul
- Capacity: 8.000
- Chairman: (Turkey) Ömer Emre Erzurumluoğlu
- Manager: (Turkey) Kenan Serdar Gücüyener
- League: Istanbul Super Amateur League Group IV
- 2022–23: Istanbul SAL 6th Group, 5th
- Website: http://www.bakirkoysk.com/
Home colours	Away colours

Bakırköyspor is a Turkish sports club from Bakırköy, Istanbul. The club was founded in 1949. The colours of Bakırköyspor are green-black. Bakırköyspor played in the Turkish Super League for 3 years, but after several unsuccessful seasons, Bakırköyspor was relegated to the amateur league in the 2006–07 season. Now Bakırköyspor plays in the Istanbul Super Amateur League, five levels below the Süper Lig. The club finished 8th in the 4th group in 2014-15 and 3rd in the 2nd group in 2015–16 seasons.

The home of the Bakırköyspor is Şenlikköy Stadium, which has a capacity of 8000 people. Colors of the club are green and black, which are accepted as traditional colors of the Bakırköy neighborhood.

== League participations ==
- Turkish Super League: 1990–93
- TFF First League: 1985–90, 1993–01
- TFF Second League: 1984–85
- TFF Third League: 2001–07
- Amatör Futbol Ligleri: 2007–

== Notable players ==
Internationally capped players

- (Socialist Federal Republic of Yugoslavia) Xhevat Prekazi
- (Romania) Iosif Rotariu
- (Poland) Jarosław Araszkiewicz
- (Poland) Piotr Nowak
- (Germany) Michael Kraft
- (Turkey) Fatih Akyel
- (Turkey) Orkun Uşak
