= 2004–05 Mersin İdmanyurdu season =

Mersin İdmanyurdu
2004–05 season
- President: Hasan Ahi
- Head coach: Levent Arıkdoğan
- Stadium: Tevfik Sırrı Gür Stadium; Mersin, Turkey
- TFF First League: 7th
- Turkish Cup: Eliminated at R2
- Top goalscorer: League: Sedat Debreli (10); All: Sedat Debreli (10)

Mersin İdmanyurdu (also Mersin İdman Yurdu, Mersin İY, or MİY) Sports Club; located in Mersin, east Mediterranean coast of Turkey in 2004–05. The team participated in Second League Category A for 3rd time in the league's 4th season. Mersin İdmanyurdu football team has finished 2004–05 season in 7th place in Turkish Second League Category A. Mersin idmanyurdu participated in 2004–05 Turkish Cup, and eliminated at second stage.

Hasan Ahi was the president of the club. MİY's formerplayer Levent Arıkdoğan coached the team during the season. Önal Arıca and Selim Özer were the mostly appeared players in the team rosters with 33 appearances each. Season and league top goal scorer was Sedat Debreli (10); and Kerem Zengin, loaned player from Fenerbahçe followed him (9).

== 2004–05 TFF First League participation ==
Mersin İdmanyurdu participated in 2004–05 Second League Category A (the league has been played under the name of "Second League Category A" between 2001–02 and 2005–06; "TFF League A" in 2006–07; and "TFF First League" since 2007–08. Also sponsor names have been included in various seasons.). 18 teams attended in the league. Winners, runners-up and second runners-up were directly promoted to 2005–06 Süper Lig. Bottom three teams were relegated to 2005–06 TFF Second League.

Mersin İdmanyurdu participated in 2004–05 Second League Category A and finished 7th.

=== Results summary ===
Mersin İdmanyurdu (MİY) 2004–05 Second League Category A season league summary:

	Overall									Home								Away							
Stage	Pc	Pl	W	D	L	GF	GA	GD	Pt	Pl	W	D	L	GF	GA	GD	Pt	Pl	W	D	L	GF	GA	GD	Pt
First half	10	17	5	7	5	26	28	-2	22	9	3	5	1	17	13	+4	14	8	2	2	4	9	15	-6	8
Second half		17	10	1	6	23	25	-2	31	8	6	0	2	10	8	+2	18	9	4	1	4	13	17	-4	13
Overall	7	34	15	8	11	49	53	-4	53	17	9	5	3	27	21	+6	32	17	6	3	8	22	32	-10	21

Sources: 2004–05 TFF First League pages.

=== League table ===
Mersin İdmanyurdu (MİY) 2003–04 Second League Category A season place in league table.

Pc	Team	Games				Goals		Pts	Home			Away		
Pc	Team	Pl	W	D	L	F	A	Pts	F–A	R	Pc	F–A	R	Pc
1	Sivasspor (C) (P)	34	23	5	6	58	24	74	0–3	29	7	0–2	12	7
2	Vestel Manisaspor (P)	34	20	9	5	55	26	69	1–4	5	13	0–3	22	8
3	Kayseri Erciyesspor (P)	34	21	5	8	64	46	68	2–1	11	7	2–0	28	7
4	Bursaspor	34	18	9	7	61	26	63	0–0	17	10	0–5	17	7
5	Kocaelispor	34	17	11	6	49	28	62	2–2	15	10	1–3	32	7
6	Elazığspor	34	17	6	1	53	45	57	2–2	2	16	3–2	19	8
7	Mersin İdmanyurdu	34	15	8	11	49	53	53						
8	Türk Telekomspor	34	13	10	11	44	42	49	1–0	27	7	2–3	10	8
9	İstanbul Büyükşehir Belediyespor	34	12	10	12	34	35	46	1–0	18	10	0–2	1	17
10	Mardinspor	34	12	9	13	33	34	45	2–1	20	7	2–0	3	8
11	Altay	34	11	7	16	41	49	40	2–1	7	10	0–1	24	9
12	Dardanelspor	34	11	6	17	54	57	39	3–2	31	7	0–4	14	10
13	Karşıyaka	34	11	5	18	41	50	38	2–1	33	7	0–0	16	10
14	Antalyaspor	34	9	10	15	42	45	37	0–1	23	9	1–1	6	14
15	Yimpaş Yozgatspor	34	8	9	17	48	64	33	2–2	13	8	3–1	30	7
16	Sarıyer (R)	34	7	6	21	32	56	27	1–0	25	8	4–3	8	8
17	Adanaspor (R)	34	7	6	21	38	70	27	0–0	4	10	1–1	21	8
18	Fatih Karagümrük (R)	34	6	5	23	31	77	23	6–1	9	6	3–1	26	7

Three points for a win. Rules for classification: 1) points; 2) tie-break; 3) goal difference; 4) number of goals scored. In the score columns first scores belong to MİY.

(C): Champions; (P): Promoted to 2005–06 Süper Lig; (R): Relegated to 2005–06 TFF Second League.

Source: 2004–05 TFF First League pages from TFF website, Turkish-Soccer website, and Maçkolik website.

=== Results by round ===
Results of games MİY played in 2004–05 Second League Category A by rounds:

Round	1	2	3	4	5	6	7	8	9	10	11	12	13	14	15	16	17	18	19	20	21	22	23	24	25	26	27	28	29	30	31	32	33	34
Ground	A	H	A	H	H	A	H	A	H	A	H	A	H	A	H	A	H	H	A	H	A	A	H	A	H	A	H	A	H	A	H	A	H	A
Result	L	D	W	D	L	D	W	W	W	L	W	L	D	L	D	D	D	W	W	W	D	L	L	L	W	W	W	W	L	W	W	L	W	L
Position	17	16	8	10	13	14	10	8	6	8	7	7	8	10	10	10	10	10	8	7	8	8	9	9	8	7	7	7	7	7	7	7	7	7

Source: 2004–05 TFF First League pages.
A = Away; H = Home; W = Win; D = Draw; L = Loss

=== First half ===
Mersin İdmanyurdu (MİY) 2004–05 Second League Category A season first half game reports is shown in the following table. Kick off times are in EET and EEST.

28 August 2004 Round 1	İstanbul BŞB	2 – 0	Mersin İdmanyurdu	Ç. Emeç Stadium, B.paşa, Istanbul
Saturday, 17:00	Ünal Sarı 59' (F); Gökmen Ağbulak 90' (F); Ünal Sarı (yellow card) 18'; Zeynel Yaldız (yellow card) 66'; Volkan Glatt (yellow card) 88'	Report	(yellow card) 40' Murat Ataş; (yellow card) 44' Cemal Koç; (yellow card) 81' (red card) Ufuk Talay; (yellow card) 86' Emre Koşağan	Referee: Uğur Söylemez

5 September 2004 Round 2	Mersin İdmanyurdu	2 – 2	Elazığspor	12 Şubat Stadium, Kahramanmaraş
Sunday, 16:00	Sezar Güner 65' (pen.); Cemal Koç 84' (F); İlker Erbay (yellow card) 38'; Ulaç Çağlayan (yellow card) 55'	Report	56' (H) Evren Avşar; 76' (F) Hakikat Yıldırım; (yellow card) 55' Ümit İnal; (yellow card) 65' Bülent Bal	Referee: Mücahit Tatar

12 September 2004 Round 3	Mardinspor	0 – 2	Mersin İdmanyurdu	21 Kasım Stadium, Mardin
Sunday, 16:00	Volkan Bayar (yellow card) 23'; Hakan Özyay (yellow card) 56'; Mehmet Çetinkaya (yellow card) 75'	Report	59' (F) Taylan Eliaçık; 68' (F) Mesut Akşit; (yellow card) 53' Mesut Akşit; (yellow card) 61' Orhan Altay; (yellow card) 85' Cemal Koç	Referee: Yıldıray Arslan

18 September 2004 Round 4	Mersin İdmanyurdu	0 – 0	Adanaspor	Tevfik Sırrı Gür Stadium, Mersin
Saturday, 16:00	İlker Erbay (yellow card) 29'	Report	(yellow card) 14' Ahmet Çenet; (yellow card) 38' Mehmet Budak; (yellow card) 48' Faruk Temel	Referee: Cüneyt Elmaskeser

25 September 2004 Round 5	Mersin İdmanyurdu	1 – 4	Vestel Manisaspor	Tevfik Sırrı Gür Stadium, Mersin
Saturday, 14:00	Mesut Akşit 89' (F); Ulaç Çağlayan (yellow card) 40'; Cemal Koç (yellow card) 61'; Mesut Akşit (yellow card) 86'	Report	16' (F) İnanç Gültekin; 20' (pen.) Coşkun Birdal; 63' (F) Sercan Bilinç Güvenışık; 77' (F) Tufan Esin; (yellow card) 37' Vedat İnceefe; (yellow card) 42' Hakan Kadir Balta; (yellow card) 56' Tufan Esin	Referee: Bünyamin Gezer

2 October 2004 Round 6	Antalyaspor	1 – 1	Mersin İdmanyurdu	Atatürk Stadium, Antalya
Saturday, 19:00	Doğa Kaya 89' (F); Burak Yılmaz (yellow card) 73'	Report	49' (H) Sedat Debreli; (yellow card) 74' Murat Ataş; (yellow card) 78' Mesut Akşit; (yellow card) 86' Orhan Altay	Referee: Ziya Çetin

10 October 2004 Round 7	Mersin İdmanyurdu	2 – 1	Altay	Tevfik Sırrı Gür Stadium, Mersin
Sunday, 15:00	Kerim Zengin 16' (F); Kerim Zengin 56' (F); Mesut Akşit (yellow card) 55'; İlker Erbay (yellow card) 59'; Ufuk Talay (yellow card) 61'; Selim Özer (yellow card) 80'; Önal Arıca (yellow card) 88'	Report	26' (F) Yasin Avcı; (yellow card) 86' Murat Karakoç; (yellow card) 89' Remzi Acet	Referee: Yılnur Önen

16 October 2004 Round 8	Sarıyer	3 – 4	Mersin İdmanyurdu	Yusuf Ziya Öniş Stadium, Istanbul
Sunday, 15:00	Metin Karaca 16' (F); Ümit Teke 46' (F); Ümit Teke 51' (F); Günay Mutlu (yellow card) 32'; Ümit Teke (yellow card) 70'; Barış Takaoğlu (yellow card) 78'; Mustafa Macit Güven (yellow card) 88'; Niyazi Hüseyinoğlu (yellow card) 90'	Report	19' (F) Sedat Debreli; 57' (F) İlker Erbay; 80' (F) Ahmet Kolcu; 90' (F) Kerim Zengin; (yellow card) 59' İlker Erbay; (yellow card) 63' Selim Özer; (yellow card) 76' Ulaç Çağlayan; (yellow card) 90' Kerim Zengin	Referee: Mustafa Sağlam

24 October 2004 Round 9	Mersin İdmanyurdu	6 – 1	Fatih Karagümrük	Tevfik Sırrı Gür Stadium, Mersin
Sunday, 15:00	Ufuk Talay 15' (F); Ulaç Çağlayan 36' (F); Sedat Debreli 59' (F); Ahmet Kolcu 63' (F); Halil Tosun 82' (F); Sezar Güner 88' (F)	Report	71' (H) Cihan Gümüş; (yellow card) 77' Bülent Zafer karagöz (red card) 83' Kerem Menekşe	Referee: M. Cemil Şensöz

31 October 2004 Round 10	Türk Telekomspor	3 – 2	Mersin idmanyurdu	Macunköy Stadium, Ankara
Sunday, 13:30	Mehmet Yıldız 4' (F); Mehmet Yıldız 31' (F); Burhan Coşkun 87' (F); Burhan Coşkun (yellow card) 70'; Cem Hallaçeli (yellow card) 77'; Hakan Genç (red card) 87'	Report	61' (F) Kerim Zengin; 67' (F) Ulaç Çağlayan; (yellow card) 23' Önal Arıca; (yellow card) 36' Serkan Uçak; (yellow card) 80' Ufuk Talay	Referee: Metin Aydoğan

7 November 2004 Round 11	Mersin İdmanyurdu	2 – 1	Kayseri Erciyesspor	Tevfik Sırrı Gür Stadium, Mersin
Sunday, 13:30	Sedat Debreli 3' (H); Sedat Debreli 89' (pen.); Serkan Uçak (yellow card) 72'; Selim Özer (yellow card) 76'; Bülent Gökalp (yellow card) 81'	Report	86' (F) Cüneyt Yis; (yellow card) 76' Ömer Közen; (yellow card) 77' Ramazan Durdu; (yellow card) 88' (red card) Cem Kargın	Referee: Orhan Erdemir

14 November 2004 Round 12	Sivasspor	2 – 0	Mersin İdmanyurdu	4 Eylül Stadium, Sivas
Sunday, 13:30	Hakkı Hocaoğlu 35' (F); Ertuğrul Arslan 87' (F); Hakkı Hocaoğlu (yellow card) 38'; İlhan Ummak (yellow card) 62'; Ertuğrul Arslan (yellow card) 71'; İshak Özbey (yellow card) 88'	Report	(yellow card) 84' Ulaç Çağlayan	Referee: Fırat Aydınus

21 November 2004 Round 13	Mersin İdmanyurdu	2 – 2	Yimpaş Yozgatspor	Tevfik Sırrı Gür Stadium, Mersin
Sunday, 13:30	Kerim Zengin 30' (F); Selim Özer 76' (F); İlker Erbay (yellow card) 19'; Murat Ataş (yellow card) 35'; Serkan Uçak (yellow card) 83'; Bülent Gökalp (yellow card) 89'	Report	50' (H) Mutlu Dervişoğlu; 64' (pen.) Mutlu Dervişoğlu; (yellow card) 53' Fikret Karadeniz; (yellow card) 66' Alpaslan Gürbüz; (yellow card) 69' Ali Ravcı; (yellow card) 84' Yücel Ömür Ejder	Referee: Mehmet Fatih Gökçe

28 November 2004 Round 14	Dardanelspor	4 – 0	Mersin İdmanyurdu	18 Mart Stadium, Çanakkale
Sunday, 13:30	İlkem Özkaynak 57' (F); Hasan Kabze 61' (F); Selçuk İnan 78' (F); Hasan Kabze 89' (F); Fatih Sezer (yellow card) 15'; Ömer Kılıç (yellow card) 18'; Bekir Gür (yellow card) 25'; Murat Önür (yellow card) 54'; İlkem Özkaynak (yellow card) 55'; Murat Özavcı (yellow card) 62'; Ersin Kaya (yellow card) 73'	Report	(yellow card) 38' Ahmet Kolcu; (yellow card) 73' Ufuk Talay	Referee: Reşat İsmail Gül

4 December 2004 Round 15	Mersin İdmanyurdu	2 – 2	Kocaelispor	Tevfik Sırrı Gür Stadium, Mersin
Saturday, 13:30	Sezar Güner 39' (pen.); Tarkan Özyılmaz 72' (F); Ahmet Kolcu (yellow card) 44'; İlker Erbay (yellow card) 63'; Serkan Uçak (yellow card) 77'	Report	35' (F) Bülent Öztürk; 85' (pen.) Engin Öztonga; (yellow card) 39' Ömer Aysan Barış; (yellow card) 63' Ercan Ağaçe; (yellow card) 80' Emre Güsar; (yellow card) 83' (red card) Ali Eren Beşerler; (yellow card) 89' Bülent Öztürk	Referee: Cem Papila

11 December 2004 Round 16	Karşıyaka	0 – 0	Mersin İdmanyurdu	Alsancak Stadium, İzmir
Saturday, 13:30	İlker Dalçiçek (yellow card) 24'; Emrah Umut (yellow card) 43'; Ufuk Arslan (yellow card) 88'	Report	(yellow card) 86' Ufuk Talay	Referee: Mustafa Kamil Abitoğlu

19 December 2004 Round 17	Mersin idmanyurdu	0 – 0	Bursaspor	Tevfik Sırrı Gür Stadium, Mersin
Sunday, 13:30	Altay Can (yellow card) 85'; Serkan Uçak (yellow card) 88' (red card)	Report	(yellow card) 5' Serdar Kurtuluş	Referee: Bülent Yıldırım

Sources: 2004–05 TFF First League pages.

=== Second half ===
Mersin İdmanyurdu (MİY) 2004–05 Second League Category A season second half game reports is shown in the following table. Kick off times are in EET and EEST.

30 January 2005 Round 18	Mersin İdmanyurdu	1 – 0	İstanbul BŞB	Tevfik Sırrı Gür Stadium, Mersin
Sunday, 13:30	Kerim Zengin 59' (F); Ulaç Çağlayan (yellow card) 24'	Report	(yellow card) 23' Tolga Güneş; (yellow card) 56' Efe İnanç	Referee: M. Cemil Şensöz

6 February 2005 Round 19	Elazığspor	2 – 3	Mersin İdmanyurdu	Atatürk Stadium, Elazığ
Sunday, 13:00	Çetin Güner 64' (H); Erkan Ergün 72' (F); Bülent Bal (yellow card) 21'; Evren Avşar (yellow card) 73'	Report	23' (H) Ahmet Kolcu; 27' (F) Kerim Zengin; 90' (F) Ahmet Kolcu; (yellow card) 28' İlker Erbay; (yellow card) 33' Ahmet Kolcu; (yellow card) 44' Altay Can; (yellow card) 45' Mesut Akşit	Referee: Metin Tokat

13 February 2005 Round 20	Mersin İdmanyurdu	2 – 1	Mardinspor	Tevfik Sırrı Gür Stadium, Mersin
Sundasy, 13:30	Sedat Debreli 30' (F); Mehmet Zengin 62' (F); Cemal Koç (yellow card) 52'; Mehmet Zengin (yellow card) 72' (red card); İlhan Aksoy (yellow card) 90'	Report	36' (H) Şehmus Özer; (yellow card) 40' Can Polat; (yellow card) 90' Mehmet Çetinkaya	Referee: Mustafa Sağlam

20 February 2005 Round 21	Adanaspor	1 – 1	Mersin İdmanyurdu	5 Ocak Stadium, Adana
Sunday, 13:30	Ümit Ozan Kazmaz 89' (pen.); Aytek Aşıkoğlu (yellow card) 58'; Ümit Ozan Kazmaz (yellow card) 64'; Özgür Yıldırım (yellow card) 73'; Atilla Küçüktaka (yellow card) 89'	Report	60' (F) Sedat Debreli; (yellow card) 38' İlker Erbay; (yellow card) 78' Ulaç Çağlayan; (red card) 89' Önal Arıca	Referee: Aytekin Durmaz

27 February 2005 Round 22	Vestel Manisaspor	3 – 0	Mersin İdmanyurdu	19 Mayıs Stadium, Manisa
Sunday, 13:30	Birol Aksancak 6' (F); Birol Aksancak 24' (F); Coşkun Birdal 70' (H); Güngör Öztürk (yellow card) 55'	Report	(yellow card) 21' Cemal Koç	Referee: Mustafa Kamil Abitoğlu

6 March 2005 Round 23	Mersin İdmanyurdu	0 – 1	Antalyaspor	Tevfik Sırrı Gür Stadium, Mersin
Sunday, 13:30		Report	37' (F) Burak Yılmaz; (yellow card) 28' Osman Yeşilmeşe; (yellow card) 43' Mehmet Yılmaz; (yellow card) 43' Mustafa Gürsel; (yellow card) 55' Sinan Yeşil; (yellow card) 80' Selahattin Göksel Gencer	Referee: Sabit Hacıömeroğlu

12 March 2005 Round 24	Altay	1 – 0	Mersin İdmanyurdu	Alsancak Stadium, İzmir
Saturday, 13:30	Metin Depe 85' (H); Serkan Tuncel (yellow card) 89'	Report	(yellow card) 57' Orhan Altay; (yellow card) 70' Ergin Şimşek; (yellow card) 72' Halil Tosun	Referee: Sinan Baş

19 March 2005 Round 25	Mersin İdmanyurdu	1 – 0	Sarıyer	Tevfik Sırrı Gür Stadium, Mersin
Saturday, 13:00	Ahmet Kolcu 77' (F); Mesut Akşit (yellow card) 42'; Sedat Debreli (yellow card) 88'; İlker Erbay (yellow card) 89'	Report	(yellow card) 88' Niyazi Hüseyinoğlu; (yellow card) 89' Ümit Teke	Referee: Mustafa İlker Coşkun

26 March 2005 Round 26	Fatih Karagümrük	1 – 3	Mersin İdmanyurdu	Vefa Stadium, Istanbul
Saturday, 13:00	Gökhan Tandoğan 3' (F); Veysel Beşik (red card) 9'; Hakan Özkan (yellow card) 10'; Muharrem Göktuğ Güven (yellow card) 77'; Süleyman Görgün (red card) 85'	Report	42' (H) Altay Can; 48' (F) Sedat Debreli; 53' (F) Halil Tosun; (yellow card) 66' Ahmet Kolcu; (yellow card) 69' Selim Özer; (yellow card) 85' Ömür Özünal; (red card) 85' İlker Erbay	Referee: Hakan Özkan

3 April 2005 Round 27	Mersin İdmanyurdu	1 – 0	Türk Telekomspor	Tevfik Sırrı Gür Stadium, Mersin
Sunday, 14:30	Tarkan Özyılmaz 81' (F); Mevlüt Metli (yellow card) 33'; Ulaç Çağlayan (yellow card) 44'; Cemal Koç (yellow card) 53'	Report	(yellow card) 75' Serdar Aydın	Referee: Reşat İsmail Gül

10 April 2005 Round 28	Kayseri Erciyesspor	0 – 2	Mersin İdmanyurdu	Atatürk Stadium, Kayseri
Sunday, 14:30	Mehmet Ayaz (yellow card) 15'; Cem Kargın (yellow card) 43'; Ömer Közen (yellow card) 43'; Cüneyt Yis (yellow card) 72'; Murat Akyüz (yellow card) 77'	Report	65' (H) Sedat Debreli; 89' (F) Sedat Debreli; (yellow card) 14' Cemal Koç; (yellow card) 15' Mesut Akşit; (yellow card) 43' Altay Can; (yellow card) 71' Ulaç Çağlayan	Referee: Özgüç Türkalp

17 April 2005 Round 29	Mersin İdmanyurdu	0 – 3	Sivasspor	Tevfik Sırrı Gür Stadium, Mersin
Sunday, 14:30	Altay Can (yellow card) 75'	Report	26' (F) Mohamed Ali Kurtuluş; 36' (F) Mohamed Ali Kurtuluş; 87' (F) Ufuk Ateş; (yellow card) 67' Yasir Elmacı	Referee: Metin Tokat

24 April 2005 Round 30	Yimpaş Yozgatspor	1 – 3	Mersin İdmanyurdu	Bozok Stadium, Yozgat
Sunday, 14:30	Mutlu Dervişoğlu 44' (H); Ferdi Berberoğlu (yellow card) 43'	Report	62' (F) Tarkan Özyılmaz; 71' (F) Mesut Akşit; 86' (F) Kerim Zengin; (yellow card) 30' Selim Özer; (yellow card) 80' Önal Arıca; (yellow card) 88' Mesut Akşit	Referee: Nihat Akman

30 April 2005 Round 31	Mersin İdmanyurdu	3 – 2	Dardanelspor	Tevfik Sırrı Gür Stadium, Mersin
Saturday, 14:00	Selim Özer 68' (F); Kerim Zengin 78' (F); Ahmet Kolcu 82' (F); Cemal Koç (yellow card) 63'	Report	24' (F) Mehmet Topal; 88' (H) Mehmet Şen; (yellow card) 33' Murat Özavcı; (yellow card) 36' Mehmet Selçuk Hızarcı	Referee: Çağatay Şahan

8 May 2005 Round 32	Kocaelispor	3 – 1	Mersin İdmanyurdu	İsmet Paşa Stadium, İzmit, Kocaeli
Sunday, 14:00	Engin Öztonga 23' (F); Fazlı Ulusoy 43' (F); Faruk Sarman 50' (F)	Report	57' (F) Mesut Akşit	Referee: Cüneyt Elmaskeser

15 May 2005 Round 33	Mersin İdmanyurdu	2 – 1	Karşıyaka	Tevfik Sırrı Gür Stadium, Mersin
Sunday, 14:00	Halil Tosun 85' (F)	Report	22' (F) Remzi Acet; 64' (o.g.) Cüneyt Kocabıçak; (yellow card) 33' Ulaç Çağlayan; (yellow card) 63' Hidayet Levent Şeker; (yellow card) 83' İlker Erbay	Referee: Serkan Çınar

22 May 2005 Round 34	Bursaspor	5 – 0	Mersin İdmanyurdu	Atatürk Stadium, Bursa
Sunday, 14:00	Okan Yılmaz 19' (F); Okan Yılmaz 50' (F); Mehmet Al 68' (F); Serkan Reçber 76' (F); Cornel Frăsineanu 89' (F); Cornel Frăsineanu (yellow card) 49'	Report	(yellow card) 44' Hidayet Levent Şeker	Referee: Mete Kalkavan

Sources: 2004–05 TFF First League pages.

== 2004–05 Turkish Cup participation ==
2003–04 Turkish Cup was played for 43rd time as Fortis Türkiye Kupası for sponsorship purposes. This season Cup was played by 48 teams in one-leg elimination system in 3 elimination rounds prior to quarter-finals. Galatasaray won the cup for the 14th time. Mersin İdmanyurdu participated in the cup at first elimination round and was eliminated in second round.

=== Cup track ===
The drawings and results Mersin İdmanyurdu (MİY) followed in 2004–05 Turkish Cup are shown in the following table.

Round	Own League	Opponent's League	Opponent	A/H	Score	Result
Round 1	First League	Second League	Adana Demirspor	H	2–0	Promoted
Round 2	First League	Süper Lig	Diyarbakırspor	A	4–2	Eliminated

Note: In the above table 'Score' shows For and Against goals whether the match played at home or not.

=== Game details ===
Mersin İdmanyurdu (MİY) 2004–05 Turkish Cup game reports is shown in the following table. Kick off times are in EET and EEST.

27 October 2004 Round 1	Mersin İdmanyurdu	2 – 0	Adana Demirspor	Koray Aydın Stadium, Mersin
Wednesday, 13:30	Bülent Gökalp 53' (F); Bülent Gökalp 77' (F)	Report	(yellow card) 22' Volkan Öztürk; (yellow card) 41' Fatih Olgun; (yellow card) 80' Özgür Kaymaz	Referee: Kemal Çakmak

22 December 2004 Round 2	Diyarbakırspor	4 – 2 (a.e.t.)	Mersin İdmanyurdu	Atatürk Stadium, Diyarbakır
Wednesday, 13:00	Yacouba Bamba 32' (H); Sinan Kaloğlu 74' (F); Yacouba Bamba 99' (F); Eser Yağmur 106' (F)	Report	24' (F) Halil Tosun; 48' (F) İlker Erbay; (yellow card) 57' Ufuk Talay; (yellow card) 74' Selim Özer; (yellow card) 77' Emre Koşağan; (yellow card) 87' Kazım Sarı	Referee: Sabit Hacıömeroğlu

Source: 2004–05 Turkish Cup pages.

== Management ==
=== Club management ===
Hasan Ahi, a lawyer from an established family native to Mersin was elected the president of the club in the congress held on 24 May 2004.

=== Coaching team ===
Levent Arıkdoğan former player of Mersin İdmanyurdu was the head coach during the season.

2004–05 Mersin İdmanyurdu head coach

Nat	Head coach	Period	Pl	W	D	L	Notes
(Turkey)	Levent Arıkdoğan	26.08.2004 – 01.11.2005	36	16	8	12	Continued in the next season.

Note: Only official games were included.

== 2004–05 squad ==
Appearances, goals and cards count for 2004–05 Second League Category A and 2004–05 Turkish Cup games. 18 players appeared in each game roster, three to be replaced. Only the players who appeared in game rosters were included and listed in order of appearance.

O	N	Nat	Name	Birth	Born	Pos	LA	LG	CA	CG	TA	TG	Booked	Sent off (straight red)	← Season Notes →
1	1	(Turkey)	Orhan Altay	1 May 1978	Silifke	GK	25				25		3		→ previous season.
2	2	(Turkey)	Ulaç Çağlayan	9 Feb 1983	Mersin	DF	30	2	1		31	2	9		2004 ST Kartalspor.
3	3	(Turkey)	Emre Koşağan	14 Nov 1976	Istanbul	DF	15		1		16		2		→ previous season.
4	4	(Turkey)	Önal Arıca	23 Feb 1976	Mersin	DF	32		1		33		3	1	2004 ST Karabükspor.
5	5	(Turkey)	Selim Özer	26 Dec 1968	Istanbul	DF	31	2	2		33	2	6		2004 ST Kocaelispor.
6	6	(Turkey)	İlker Erbay	14 Jun 1984	Sarıyer	MF	26	1	2	1	28	2	10	1	2004 ST Beylerbeyi.
7	7	(Turkey)	Cemal Koç	5 Mar 1977	Mersin	MF	30	1	1		31	1	8		→ previous season.
8	8	(Australia)	Ufuk Talay	26 Mar 1976	Sydney	MF	12	1	2		14	1	5	1	→ previous season.
9	9	(Turkey)	Sedat Debreli	1 Jan 1983	Istanbul	MF	26	10	1		27	10	1		2004 ST Beylerbeyi.
10	10	(Turkey)	Mesut Akşit	21 Apr 1982	Diyarbakır	FW	23	4	1		24	4	8		→ previous season.
11	11	(Turkey)	Murat Ataş	17 Oct 1985	Bulanık	FW	10		1		11		3		2004 ST Esk. Şekerspor.
12	12	(Turkey)	Ömür Özünal	11 May 1982	Adana	GK	2				2		1		→ previous season.
13	13	(Turkey)	Mevlüt Metli	17 Aug 1979	Mersin	MF	7		1		8		1		2004 ST Mezitlispor.
14	14	(Turkey)	Sezar Güner	7 Nov 1972	Rize	FW	16	3	1		17	3			→ previous season.
15	15	(Turkey)	Bülent Gökalp	27 Nov 1977	Erdemli	MF	16		2	2	18	2	2		2004 ST Mezitlispor.
16	16	(Turkey)	Kerim Zengin	13 Apr 1975	Mersin	MF	21	9			21	9	1		2004 ST Fenerbahçe.
17	17	(Turkey)	Ahmet Kolcu	1 Jan 1983	Mazgirt	FW	28	6			28	6	4		→ previous season.
18	18	(Turkey)	Altay Can	17 Oct 1970	Kırcaali	MF	21	1			21	1	4		→ previous season.
19	12	(Turkey)	Kazım Sarı	9 Mar 1982	Balıkesir	GK	7		2		9		1		2004 SL Dardanelspor.
20	16	(Turkey)	Halil Tosun	19 May 1980	Orhaneli	MF	22	3	2	1	24	4	1		2004 SL Dardanelspor.
21	17	(Turkey)	Taylan Eliaçık	27 May 1984	Malatya	MF	7	1	1		8	1			→ previous season.
22	6	(Turkey)	Engin Şimşek	17 Apr 1977	Ankara	MF	15		2		17		1		2004 ST Altay.
23	14	(Turkey)	Levent Şeker	6 Jan 1985	Mersin	FW	3		2		4		2		→ previous season.
24	15	(Turkey)	Nurullah Kaya	20 Jul 1986	Batman	MF									→ previous season.
25	16	(Turkey)	Tarkan Özyılmaz	3 Apr 1975	Mersin	MF	16	3	2		18	3			→ previous season.
26	11	(Turkey)	Serkan Uçak	23 Jul 1977	Mersin	FW	13		1		14		4	1	2004 ST Şanlıurfa Bld.
27	14	(Turkey)	Veysel Kılıç	7 Sep 1987	Seyhan	FW									First time professional.
28	18	(Turkey)	Sabit Aycıl	15 Aug 1985	Mersin	FW									→ previous season.
29	17	(Turkey)	Mehmet Zengin	13 Jun 1972	Turgutlu	MF	14	1			14	1		1	2005 WT Sivasspor.
30	18	(Turkey)	İlkan Aksoy	16 Oct 1973	Rize	DF	6				6		1		2005 WT BB Ankaraspor.

Sources: TFF club page and maçkolik team page.

== See also ==
- Football in Turkey
