= 2005–06 Mersin İdmanyurdu season =

Mersin İdmanyurdu
2005–06 season
- President: Hasan Ahi (till 16 January 2006); Erol Ertan (since 16 January 2006)
- Head coach: Levent Arıkdoğan (till 1 November 2005); Engin Korukır (till 17 March 2006); Nasır Belci (till 26 September 2006)
- Stadium: Tevfik Sırrı Gür Stadium; Mersin, Turkey
- TFF First League: 16th (Relegated)
- Turkish Cup: Eliminated at Group Stage
- Top goalscorer: League: Ferdi Yanık (8); All: Ferdi Yanık (9)

Mersin İdmanyurdu (also Mersin İdman Yurdu, Mersin İY, or MİY) Sports Club; located in Mersin, east Mediterranean coast of Turkey in 2005–06. The team participated in Second League Category A for 4th time in the league's 5th season. Mersin İdmanyurdu football team has finished 2005–06 season in 16th place in Turkish Second League Category A. Team participated in 2005–06 Turkish Cup, and eliminated after group stage.

Hasan Ahi was club president at the start of the season. Erol Ertan was elected president in the mid-season. MİY started to season with Levent Arıkdoğan as the head coach. Then Engin Korukır and Nasır Belci took the position within the season. Serkan Merç and Birand Yataş had the most appearances, with 36 each. Ferdi Yanık was the season top goalscorer with 9 goals.

== 2005–06 TFF First League participation ==
Mersin idmanyurdu participated in 2005–06 Second League Category A (the league has been played under the name of "Second League Category A" between 2001–02 and 2005–06; "TFF League A" in 2006–07; and "TFF First League" since 2007–08. Also sponsor names have been included in various seasons.). 18 teams attended in the league. Winners and runners-up were directly promoted to 2006–07 Süper Lig. The teams placed 3rd through 6th in the normal season played promotion play-offs to determine third team to be promoted. Bottom three teams were relegated to 2006–07 TFF Second League.

Mersin idmanyurdu participated in 2005–06 Second League Category A and finished 16th meaning that the team was relegated to 2006–07 Second League Category B, the third tier, for the second time in its history.

=== Results summary ===
Mersin İdmanyurdu (MİY) 2005–06 Second League Category A season league summary:

	Overall									Home								Away							
Stage	Pc	Pl	W	D	L	GF	GA	GD	Pt	Pl	W	D	L	GF	GA	GD	Pt	Pl	W	D	L	GF	GA	GD	Pt
First half	15	17	4	4	9	15	28	-13	16	8	3	3	2	11	10	+1	12	9	1	1	7	4	18	-14	4
Second half		17	2	7	8	15	26	-11	13	9	1	4	4	11	16	-5	7	8	1	3	4	4	10	-6	6
Owerall	16	34	6	11	17	30	54	-24	29	17	4	7	6	22	26	-4	19	17	2	4	11	8	28	-20	10

Sources: 2005–06 TFF First League pages.

=== League table ===
Mersin İdmanyurdu (MİY) 2005–06 Second League Category A season place in league table.

Pos	Team	Pld	W	D	L	GF	GA	GD	Pts	Qualification or relegation
14	Uşakspor	34	11	7	16	40	54	−14	40	
15	Akçaabat Sebatspor	34	7	13	14	37	54	−17	34	
16	Mersin İdman Yurdu (R)	34	6	11	17	30	54	−24	29	Relegation to Turkish Second League Category B
17	Yozgatspor (R)	34	6	10	18	32	55	−23	28	Relegation to Turkish Second League Category B
18	Çanakkale Dardanelspor (R)	34	5	4	25	23	73	−50	19	Relegation to Turkish Second League Category B

Source: TFF
Rules for classification: 1) points; 2) goal difference; 3) number of goals scored.
(R) Relegated

=== Results by round ===
Results of games MİY played in 2005–06 Second League Category A by rounds:

Round	1	2	3	4	5	6	7	8	9	10	11	12	13	14	15	16	17	18	19	20	21	22	23	24	25	26	27	28	29	30	31	32	33	34
Ground	H	A	A	H	A	H	A	H	A	H	A	H	A	H	A	H	A	A	H	H	A	H	A	H	A	H	A	H	A	H	A	H	A	H
Result	W	L	L	W	L	D	L	D	L	L	W	L	D	W	L	D	L	D	L	D	W	L	L	D	L	L	L	D	D	W	D	D	L	L
Position	2	8	11	9	11	11	13	12	14	14	13	15	15	14	14	14	15	15	16	16	15	15	15	15	15	16	16	16	16	16	15	15	16	16

Source: 2005–06 TFF First League pages.
A = Away; H = Home; W = Win; D = Draw; L = Loss

=== First half ===
Mersin İdmanyurdu (MİY) 2005–06 Second League Category A season first half game reports is shown in the following table. Kick off times are in EET and EEST.

28 August 2005 Round 1	Mersin İdmanyurdu	3 – 0	Çanakkale Dardanelspor	Tevfik Sırrı Gür Stadium, Mersin
Sunday, 17:00	Ferdi Yanık 27' (H); Ferdi Yanık 85' (F); Ferdi Yanık 89' (F); Cemal Koç (yellow card) 16'; Seydihan Başlantı (yellow card) 22'; Serkan Merç (yellow card) 34'; Selim Özer (yellow card) 59'	Report	(yellow card) 23' Murat Önür	Referee: Çağatay Şahan

4 September 2005 Round 2	Mardinspor	1 – 0	Mersin İdmanyurdu	21 Kasım Stadium, Mardin
Sunday, 16:00	Cem Hallaçeli 7' (H); Şehmus Özer (yellow card) 51'	Report	(yellow card) 51' (red card) Selim Özer; (yellow card) 89' Önal Arıca	Referee: Nihat Akman

11 September 2005 Round 3	Bursaspor	3 – 0	Mersin İdmanyurdu	Atatürk Stadium, Bursa
Sunday, 19:00	Eser Yağmur 25' (F); Yunus Altun 58' (H); Serdar Topraktepe 73' (H); Serkan Reçber (yellow card) 65'; Ömer Aysan Barış (yellow card) 82'	Report	(yellow card) 12' Cemal Koç; (yellow card) 24' Serkan Damla; (yellow card) 50' Serkan Merç; (yellow card) 57' Ulaç Çağlayan; (yellow card) 70' Ferdi Yanık	Referee: Yılnur Önen

18 September 2005 Round 4	Mersin İdmanyurdu	3 – 2	Akçaabat Sebatspor	Tevfik Sırrı Gür Stadium, Mersin
Sunday, 16:00	Ferdi Yanık 21' (F); Sezar Güner 48' (P); Ulaç Çağlayan 52' (F); Ferdi Yanık (yellow card) 26'; Cemal Koç (yellow card) 31'; Yaser Yıldız (yellow card) 86'; Altay Can (yellow card) 88'	Report	25' (F) Ergin Keleş; 90' (F) Barış Bayram; (yellow card) 44' Mustafa Beşir; (yellow card) 71' Kürşat Ergün Aydın	Referee: Mithat Kamil Biricik

25 September 2005 Round 5	Elazığspor	3 – 0	Mersin İdmanyurdu	Atatürk Stadium, Elazığ
Sunday, 16:00	Mehmet Öncan 14' (F); Mehmet Öncan 24' (F); Göksel Yaman 35' (F); Serkan Kılıç (yellow card) 60'	Report	(yellow card) 21' Birand Yaytaş; (yellow card) 51' Selim Özer; (yellow card) 77' İlkan Aksoy	Referee: Bünyamin Gezer

2 October 2005 Round 6	Mersin İdmanyurdu	0 – 0	Yozgatspor	Tevfik Sırrı Gür Stadium, Mersin
Sunday, 15:00	Altay Can (yellow card) 64'; Yaser Yıldız (yellow card) 76'; Selim Özer (yellow card) 79'; Ulaç Çağlayan (red card) 89'	Report	(yellow card) 42' Hüseyin Ateş; (yellow card) 54' Tarık Daşgün; (yellow card) 82' Timur Yanyali; (yellow card) 86' Evren Otyakmaz; (yellow card) 87' Başar Öner	Referee: Derya Ahmet Kocabaş

9 October 2005 Round 7	İstanbul BŞB	2 – 0	Mersin İdmanyurdu	Ç. Emeç Stadium, B.paşa, Istanbul
Sunday, 15:00	Abdulvahit Karacabey 28' (F); Erol Kapusuz 32' (F); Volkan Koçaloğlu (yellow card) 77'	Report	(yellow card) 6' Serkan Merç; (yellow card) 65' Bülent Gökalp	Referee: Zafer Demir

16 October 2005 Round 8	Mersin İdmanyurdu	1 – 1	Karşıyaka	Tevfik Sırrı Gür Stadium, Mersin
Sunday, 15:00	Ferdi Yanık 75' (F); Altay Can (yellow card) 39'; Mevlüt Metli (yellow card) 88'	Report	72' (F) Selahattin Kınalı; (yellow card) 19' Emrah Umut; (yellow card) 60' Ümit Tütünci; (red card) 83' Atilla Güneş	Referee: Mustafa Kamil Abitoğlu

23 October 2005 Round 9	Antalyaspor	2 – 1	Mersin İdmanyurdu	Atatürk Stadium, Antalya
Sunday, 20:00	Taner Gülleri 27' (F); Mustafa Gürsel 61' (F); Tayfun Seven (yellow card) 85'	Report	22' (F) Bülent Gükalp; (yellow card) 85' Ferdi Yanık	Referee: Ziya Çetin

30 October 2005 Round 10	Mersin İdmanyurdu	0 – 2	Sakaryaspor	Tevfik Sırrı Gür Stadium, Mersin
Sunday, 13:30		Report	73' (P) Kemal Volkan Özkalyoncu; 75' (F) Murat Bölükbaş; (yellow card) 51' (red card) Onur Nasuhoğulları; (yellow card) 56' Gökhan Çalışal; (yellow card) 86' Marcel Kimemba Mbayo	Referee: Çetin Sarıgül

6 November 2005 Round 11	Türk Telekomspor	1 – 2	Mersin İdmanyurdu	Türk Telekom Stadium, Ankara
Sunday, 13:30	Serdar Sinik 80' (P); Ömer Yavuz (yellow card) 11'; Hakan Genç (yellow card) 61'; Erhan Doğan (yellow card) 88' (red card); Muharrem Aydın (yellow card) 89'	Report	30' (F) Mehmet Zengin; 54' (F) Ferdi Yanık; (yellow card) 3' Ferdi Yanık; (yellow card) 61' Bülent Gökalp	Referee: Çağatay Şahan

13 November 2005 Round 12	Mersin İdmanyurdu	1 – 3	Kocaelispor	Tevfik Sırrı Gür Stadium, Mersin
Sunday, 13:30	Mehmet Zengin 89' (F); Cemal Koç (yellow card) 16'; Ulaç Çağlayan (yellow card) 61'	Report	34' (F) Özgür Karakaya; 82' (F) Özgür Karakaya; 86' (F) Özgür Karakaya; (yellow card) 57' Cihan Korucuoğlu; (yellow card) 89' Özgür Karakaya	Referee: Uğur Söylemez

20 November 2005 Round 13	Gaziantep BŞB	0 – 0	Mersin İdmanyurdu	Gaski Sport Facilities, Gaziantep
Sunday, 13:30	Onur Okan (yellow card) 44' ehmet Yılmaz (yellow card) 65'; Şadi Çolak (yellow card) 66' (red card)	Report	(yellow card) 44' Serkan Damla; (yellow card) 87' Kamil Aslan	Referee: Abdullah Yılmaz

27 November 2005 Round 14	Mersin İdmanyurdu	2 – 1	Uşakspor	Tevfik Sırrı Gür Stadium, Mersin
Sunday, 13:30	Ulaç Çağlayan 42' (F); Ferdi Yanık 56' (P); Cemal Koç (yellow card) 25'; Bülent Gökalp (yellow card) 85'	Report	22' (H) Önder Dalkıran; (yellow card) 40' Özgür Yıldırım; (yellow card) 55' Süleyman Görgün; (yellow card) 65' İbrahim Halil Yiğit	Referee: Halis Özkahya

4 December 2005 Round 15	İstanbulspor	2 – 0	Mersin İdmanyurdu	Zeytinburnu Stadium, Istanbul
Sunday, 13:30	Mahmut Acar 65' (F); Elvir Bolić 89' (F); Cem Can (yellow card) 78'; Haluk Güngör (yellow card) 79'; Hamza Gezmiş (yellow card) 88'; Abdullah Ercan (yellow card) 89'	Report	(yellow card) 33' Önal Arıca; (yellow card) 48' Birand Yaytaş	Referee: Mücahit Tatar

11 December 2005 Round 16	Mersin İdmanyurdu	1 – 1	Altay	Tevfik Sırrı Gür Stadium, Mersin
Sunday, 13:30	Yaser Yıldız 23' (F); Selim Özer (yellow card) 19'; Ulaç Çağlayan (yellow card) 32'; Serkan Merç (yellow card) 68'; Cemal Koç (yellow card) 74'; Seydihan Başlantı (yellow card) 78' (red card)	Report	94' (F) Çetin Limanoğlu; (yellow card) 4' Eren Güngör; (yellow card) 39' Niyazi Hüseyinoğlu; (yellow card) 87' Mehmet Deliorman	Referee: Süleyman Abay

18 December 2005 Round 17	Orduspor	4 – 1	Mersin İdmanyurdu	19 Eylül Stadium, Ordu
Sunday, 13:30	Erkan Ergün 4' (F); Erkan Ergün 34' (H); Gökhan Günay 52' (F); Serkan Turhan 64' (F); Erkan Ergün (yellow card) 25'; Selçuk Yıldırımkaya (yellow card) 60' (red card); Gökhan Kolomoç (yellow card) 87'	Report	22' (H) Yaser Yıldız; (yellow card) 46' Sezar Güner; (yellow card) 48' (red card) Kamil Aslan	Referee: Metin Tokat

Sources: 2005–06 TFF First League pages.

=== Second half ===
Mersin İdmanyurdu (MİY) 2005–06 Second League Category A season second half game reports is shown in the following table. Kick off times are in EET and EEST.

22 January 2006 Round 18	Çanakkale Dardanelspor	0 – 0	Mersin İdmanyurdu	18 Mart Stadium, Çanakkale
Sunday, 13:30	Murat Önür (yellow card) 77'	Report	(yellow card) 8' Birand Yaytaş; (yellow card) 44' Önal Arıca	Referee: Nihat Akman

30 March 2006 Round 19	Mersin İdmanyurdu	0 – 2	Mardinspor	Tevfik Sırrı Gür Stadium, Mersin
Thursday, 14:30		Report	34' (F) Şehmus Özer; 87' (F) Şehmus Özer; (yellow card) 53' Faruk Namdar; (yellow card) 58' Çetin Kılıç	Referee: Reşat İsmail Gül

5 February 2006 Round 20	Mersin İdmanyurdu	1 – 1	Bursaspor	H. Mahçiçek Stadium, K.maraş
Sunday, 13:30	Ferdi Yanık 62' (F); Ulaç Çağlayan (yellow card) 36'; Önal Arıca (yellow card) 74'; Altay Can (yellow card) 90'	Report	54' (P) Cornel Frăsineanu; (yellow card) 31' Burak Akdiş; (yellow card) 43' Ertuğrul Arslan; (yellow card) 61' Egemen Korkmaz	Referee: Fırat Aydınus

11 February 2006 Round 21	Akçaabat Sebatspor	0 – 2	Mersin İdmanyurdu	Akçaabat Fatih Stadium, Trabzon
Saturday, 13:30	Selim Akbulut 63' (o.g.); Serdar Erkan (yellow card) 49'	Report	11' (F) Selim Özer; (yellow card) 23' Ramazan Özalp; (yellow card) 70' Fatih Nazlım	Referee: Oktay Demiray

19 February 2006 Round 22	Mersin İdmanyurdu	1 – 2	Elazığspor	Tevfik Sırrı Gür Stadium, Mersin
Sunday, 13:30	Ali Öztürk 88' (F); Birand Yaytaş (yellow card) 31'	Report	84' (F) Adnan Demirel; 90' (F) Korhan Öztürk; (yellow card) 44' Evren Avşar; (yellow card) 58' Serkan Kılıç; (yellow card) 59' Özgür Vurur; (yellow card) 77' Gökmen Yıldıran; (yellow card) 84' Adnan Demirel	Referee: Ziya Çetin

26 February 2006 Round 23	Yozgatspor	2 – 1	Mersin İdmanyurdu	Bozok Stadium, Yozgat
Sunday, 13:30	Cem Karahan 57' (H); Emre Aygün 69' (F); Mehmet Önür (yellow card) 7'; Emre Aygün (yellow card) 28'; Hakan Tüfekçi (yellow card) 29'; İnanç Gültekin (yellow card) 83' (red card); Kerem Sarıhan (yellow card) 86'	Report	7' (F) Mesut Akşit; (yellow card) 24' Serkan Merç; (yellow card) 90' Ulaç Çağlayan	Referee: Cem Deda

5 March 2006 Round 24	Mersin İdmanyurdu	1 – 1	İstanbul BŞB	Tevfik Sırrı Gür Stadium, Mersin
Sunday, 13:30	Birand Yaytaş 71' (F); İlkan Aksoy (yellow card) 26'; Yaser Yıldız (yellow card) 75'; Altay Can (yellow card) 80'; Ali Öztürk (yellow card) 83'	Report	31' (F) Murat Uluç; (yellow card) 61' Zeki Sonbay	Referee: Yıldıray Arslan

11 March 2006 Round 25	Karşıyaka	1 – 0	Mersin İdmanyurdu	Alsancak Stadium, İzmir
Saturday, 13:30	Volkan Şahinel 80' (H); Uğur Işıkal (yellow card) 8'; Mehmet Albayrak (yellow card) 44'; Serkan Bekiroğlu (yellow card) 85'	Report	(yellow card) 82' Cemal Koç	Referee: Bünyamin Gezer

18 March 2006 Round 26	Mersin İdmanyurdu	2 – 4	Antalyaspor	Tevfik Sırrı Gür Stadium, Mersin
Saturday, 13:30	Mehmet Zengin 20' (H); Mesut Akşit 60' (F); Ulaç Çağlayan (yellow card) 83' (red card); Ali Öztürk (yellow card) 89'	Report	6' (F) Burak Yılmaz; 43' (F) Coşkun Birdal; 67' (F) Nihat Baştürk; 87' (F) Hakan Keleş; (yellow card) 35' Ümit Aydın; (yellow card) 40' Şenol Karagöl; (yellow card) 60' Burak Yılmaz; (yellow card) 85' Levent Yücel	Referee: Hüseyin Göçek

27 March 2006 Round 27	Sakaryaspor	2 – 0	Mersin İdmanyurdu	Atatürk Stadium, Adapazarı, Sakarya
Monday, 20:00	Taner Demirbaş 28' (F); Rasim Vardar 86' (F); Rasim Vardar (yellow card) 87'	Report	(yellow card) 37' Ali Öztürk; (yellow card) 74' Birand Yaytaş; (yellow card) 78' Serkan Damla; (yellow card) 89' Cemal Koç	Referee: Nihat Akman

2 April 2006 Round 28	Mersin İdmanyurdu	1 – 1	Türk Telekomspor	Tevfik Sırrı Gür Stadium, Mersin
Sunday, 14:30	Mesut Akşit 89' (F); Bülent Gökalp (yellow card) 43'; Selim Özer (yellow card) 54'; Altay Can (yellow card) 70'; Yaser Yıldız (yellow card) 73'; Barış Karaoğlu (yellow card) 78'	Report	12' (F) Alp Küçükvardar; (yellow card) 89' Ümit Tütünci	Referee: Mehmet Berkant Mercanlı

9 April 2006 Round 29	Kocaelispor	0 – 0	Mersin İdmanyurdu	İsmet Paşa Stadium, İzmit, Kocaeli
Sunday, 14:30	Mehmet Özdin (yellow card) 33'	Report	(yellow card) 59' Serkan Merç; (yellow card) 88' Cemal Koç	Referee: Zafer Demir

16 April 2006 Round 30	Mersin İdmanyurdu	3 – 2	Gaziantep BŞB	Tevfik Sırrı Gür Stadium, Mersin
Sunday, 14:30	Mehmet Zengin 37' (F); Mehmet Zengin 49' (H); Selim Özer (yellow card) 44'; Altay Can (yellow card) 58'; Birand Yaytaş (yellow card) 90'	Report	30' (F) Ömer Yalçın; 90' (P) İlker Erbay; (yellow card) 54' Mehmet Yılmaz; (yellow card) 77' Aydın Yıldırım	Referee: Kuddusi Müftüoğlu

23 April 2006 Round 31	Uşakspor	1 – 1	Mersin İdmanyurdu	1 Eylül Stadium, Uşak
Sunday, 14:30	Abdullah Apak 70' (F)	Report	2' (H) Mehmet Zengin; (yellow card) 41' Doğan Şengül; (yellow card) 44' Mesut Akşit; (red card) 60' Altay Can; (yellow card) 88' Oğuzhan Doğar; (yellow card) 89' Selim Özer	Referee: Yılnur Önen

30 April 2006 Round 32	Mersin İdmanyurdu	2 – 2	İstanbulspor	Tevfik Sırrı Gür Stadium, Mersin
Sunday, 16:00	Ali Öztürk 12' (F); Ramazan Özalp 60' (F)	Report	30' (H) Mustafa Sert; 47' (F) Serdar Samatyalı	Referee: İsmet Arzuman

7 May 2006 Round 33	Altay	4 – 0	Mersin İdmanyurdu	Atatürk Stadium, İzmir
Sunday, 15:30	Ufuk Ateş 3' (F); Ufuk Ateş 37' (F); Ufuk Ateş 44' (H); Ufuk Ateş 86' (F); Emirhan Özdemir (yellow card) 75'	Report	(yellow card) 26' Ali Öztürk; (yellow card) 72' Sezar Güner	Referee: Serdar Tatlı

14 May 2006 Round 34	Mersin İdmanyurdu	0 – 1	Orduspor	Tevfik Sırrı Gür Stadium, Mersin
Sunday, 15:30	Cemal Koç (yellow card) 36'; Mehmet Zengin (yellow card) 56'; Doğan Şengül (yellow card) 63'	Report	13' (F) İlhan Var; (yellow card) 8' Volkan Başyurt; (yellow card) 16' Şenol Demirci; (yellow card) 58' Ziya Şahin	Referee: Yılnur Önen

Sources: 2005–06 TFF First League pages.

== 2005–06 Turkish Cup participation ==
2005–06 Turkish Cup was played for 44th time as Fortis Türkiye Kupası for sponsorship purposes. The Cup was played with 54 teams in three stages. In the first stage two qualification rounds were played in one-leg elimination system. In the second stage (group stage) 20 teams played in four groups, 5 teams in each, in a one-leg round-robin system. Top two teams in each group played in knock-out stage. Beşiktaş won the cup for the 6th time. MİY played in qualification stage and was eliminated in fşrst round.

=== Cup track ===
The drawings and results Mersin İdmanyurdu (MİY) followed in 2005–06 Turkish Cup are shown in the following table.

Round	Own League	Opponent's League	Opponent	A/H	Score	Result
Round 1	First League	Second League	Alanyaspor	A	2–1	Promoted
Round 2	First League	Second League	Pazarspor	H	4–1	Promoted
Group Stage	First League	Süper Lig	Galatasaray	A	0–4	
Group Stage	First League	Süper Lig	Malatyaspor	H	0–1	
Group Stage	First League	Second League	Giresunspor	A	1–2	
Group Stage	First League	Süper Lig	Diyarbakırspor	H	1–4	Eliminated

Note: In the above table 'Score' shows For and Against goals whether the match played at home or not.

=== Game details ===
Mersin İdmanyurdu (MİY) 2005–06 Turkish Cup game reports is shown in the following table. Kick off times are in EET and EEST.

31 August 2005 Round 1	Alanyaspor	1 – 2 (a.e.t.)	Mersin İdmanyurdu	Konaklı Stadium, Alanya, Antalya
Thursday, 16:30	Furkan İlker Baştan 23' (F); Uğur Kütük (yellow card) 106'; Şahin Gökçe (yellow card) 112'; Muhammet Kaya (red card)	Report	47' (F) Sezar Güner; 110' (H) Seydihan Başlantı; (yellow card) 76' Seydihan Başlantı; (yellow card) 78' Sezar Güner	Referee: Erbay Aldemir

21 September 2005 Round 2	Mersin İdmanyurdu	4 – 1	Pazarspor	Tevfik Sırrı Gür Stadium, Mersin
Wednesday, 15:00	Birand Yaytaş 11' (F); Seydihan Başlantı 40' (F); Ferdi Yanık 60' (F); Bülent Gökalp 78' (F); Seydihan Başlantı (yellow card) 18'; Serkan Merç (yellow card) 29'; Ferdi Yanık (yellow card) 32'	Report	68' (F) Mehmet Narin; (yellow card) 33' Burak Kürşad Aydın	Referee: Yıldıray Arslan

27 October 2005 Group A R1	Galatasaray	4 – 0	Mersin idmanyurdu	Ali Sami Yen Stadium, Istanbul
Thursday, 20:00	Necati Ateş 52' (F); Uğur Uçar 70' (F); Necati Ateş 86' (P); Özgür Can Özcan 88' (H); Alioum Saidou (yellow card) 36'; Saša Ilić (yellow card) 66'	Report	(yellow card) 48' Ferdi Yanık; (yellow card) 54' Cemal Koç; (yellow card) 56' Mevlüt Metli	Referee: Mustafa Kamil Abitoğlu

31 January 2006 Group A R2	Mersin İdmanyurdu	0 – 1	Malatyaspor	Tevfik Sırrı Gür Stadium, Mersin
Tuesday, 14:00	Serkan Merç (yellow card) 33'; Kamil Aslan (yellow card) 72'; Birand Yaytaş (yellow card) 88'	Report	81' (F) Bilal Kısa	Referee: Özgüç Türkalp

15 February 2006 Group A R3	Giresunspor	2 – 1	Mersin idmanyurdu	Atatürk Stadium, Giresun
Wednesday, 14:00	Okan Çebi 35' (F); Emre Karaman 57' (F)	Report	89' (P) Ali Öztürk; (yellow card) 33' Ulaç Çağlayan; (yellow card) 69' Ali Öztürk; (yellow card) 85' Selim Özer	Referee: Nihat Akman

22 February 2006 Group A R4	Mersin İdmanyurdu	1 – 4	Diyarbakırspor	Tevfik Sırrı Gür Stadium, Mersin
Wednesday, 14:00	Ali Öztürk 53' (F); Yaser Yıldız (yellow card) 38'; Cemal Koç (yellow card) 80'	Report	6' (F) Göksel Akıncı; 25' (F) Goran Maznov; 67' (F) Recep Asıl; 69' (F) İlyas Kahraman; (yellow card) 8' Abdullah Elyasa Süme; (yellow card) 80' Ender Alkan	Referee: Çağatay Şahan

Source: 2005–06 Turkish Cup pages.

== Management ==
=== Club management ===
Hasan Ahi was club president at the start of the season. Erol Ertan, building contractor and deputy mayor of Mersin was elected president in the mid-season.

=== Coaching team ===
MİY started the season with Levent Arıkdoğan as the head coach. After 10th round he left. Assistant coaches Ahmet Lülü (goalkeeper trainer) and Yusuf Ömür managed the team during interim period. Before 13th round Engin Korukır signed. He was replaced by Nasır Belci before 25th round.

2004–05 Mersin İdmanyurdu head coaches

Nat	Head coach	Period	Pl	W	D	L	Notes
(Turkey)	Levent Arıkdoğan	26.08.2004 – 01.11.2005	13	4	2	7	Left after 10 the round.
(Turkey)	Ahmet Lülü & Yusuf Ömür	02.11.2005 – 17.11.2006	2	1	0	1	Assistant coaches.
(Turkey)	Engin Korukır	18.11.2005 – 17.03.2006	16	2	5	9	Left after 25th round.
(Turkey)	Nasır Belci	17.03.2006 – 26.09.2006	9	1	4	4	Continued in the next season.

Note: Only official games were included.

== 2005–06 squad ==
Appearances, goals and cards count for 2005–06 Second League Category A and 2005–06 Turkish Cup games. 18 players appeared in each game roster, three to be replaced. Only the players who appeared in game rosters were included and listed in order of appearance.

O	N	Nat	Name	Birth	Born	Pos	LA	LG	CA	CG	TA	TG	Booked	Sent off (straight red)	← Season Notes →
1	1	(Turkey)	Orhan Altay	1 May 1978	Silifke	GK	17		5		22				→ previous season.
2	2	(Turkey)	Birand Yaytaş	11 Jul 1975	İzmir	DF	31	1	5	1	36	2	7		2005 ST Erzurumspor.
3	3	(Turkey)	Cemal Koç	5 Mar 1977	Mersin	MF	25		3		28		12		→ previous season.
4	4	(Turkey)	Ulaç Çağlayan	9 Feb 1983	Mersin	DF	24	2	4		28	2	6	2	→ previous season.
5	5	(Turkey)	Selim Özer	26 Dec 1968	Istanbul	DF	30	1	5		35	1	8	1	→ previous season.
6	6	(Turkey)	Serkan Damla	25 Oct 1973	Mersin	MF	26		3		29		3		2005 ST Kayserispor.
7	7	(Turkey)	Kamil Aslan	4 May 1981	Aksaray	MF	21		2		23		2	1	2005 ST Adana Demirspor.
8	8	(Turkey)	Serkan Merç	1 Jan 1981	Denizli	MF	31		5		36		8		2005 ST Aydınspor.
9	9	(Turkey)	Seydihan Başlantı	29 Nov 1983	Würselen	MF	10		2	2	12	2	3	1	2005 ST Çaykur Rizespor.
10	10	(Turkey)	Sezar Güner	7 Nov 1972	Rize	FW	19	1	6	1	25	2	3		→ previous season.
11	11	(Turkey)	Ferdi Yanık	6 Mar 1981	Samsun	FW	26	8	4	1	30	9	6		2005 ST Altay.
12	12	(Turkey)	Şükrü Fırtına	17 Feb 1984	Kuşadası	GK									2005 ST Konya GB.
13	13	(Turkey)	Mevlüt Metli	17 Aug 1979	Mersin	MF	11		2		13		2		→ previous season.
14	14	(Turkey)	Mehmet Zengin	13 Jun 1972	Turgutlu	MF	24	6	3		27	6	1		→ previous season.
15	15	(Turkey)	Yaser Yıldız	1 Jun 1988	Adapazarı	MF	28	2	5		33	2	5		2005 SL Denizlispor.
16	16	(Turkey)	Ercan Güneri	15 Jun 1981	Ankara	MF	5		2		7				2005 ST Tarım Kredispor.
17	17	(Turkey)	Bülent Gökalp	27 Nov 1977	Erdemli	MF	21	1	5	1	26	2	4		→ previous season.
18	18	(Turkey)	Önal Arıca	23 Feb 1976	Mersin	DF	22		3		25		4		→ previous season.
19	4	(Turkey)	İlkan Aksoy	16 Oct 1973	Rize	DF	9		4		13		2		→ previous season.
20	14	(Turkey)	Metin Çay	15 Oct 1976	Mersin	DF									2005 ST Şanlıurfa Bel.
21	12	(Turkey)	Ömür Özünal	11 May 1982	Adana	GK	1				1				→ previous season.
22	13	(Turkey)	Altay Can	17 Oct 1970	Kırcaali	MF	19		4		23		7	1	→ previous season.
23	16	(Turkey)	Yavuz Onuk	25 Nov 1983	Germany	DF	4		2		6				2005 ST Karlsruher SC II.
24	15	(Turkey)	Fatih Nazlım	24 Aug 1985	France	MF	3		1		4		1		2005 ST Clermont Foot.
25	8	(Turkey)	Mesut Akşit	21 Apr 1982	Diyarbakır	DF	15	3	1		16	3	1		→ previous season.
26	12	(Turkey)	Oğuzhan Doğar	1 Jun 1978	Osmaniye	GK	17		1		18		1		2006 WT Uşakspor.
27	18	(Turkey)	Özgün Can Özgür	13 Jul 1987	Seyhan	FW									2006 WT Mersin BŞB.
28	17	(Turkey)	Macit Güven	2 Mar 1980	Trabzon	DF	1		1		2				2006 WT Kocaelispor
29	18	(Turkey)	Ali Öztürk	28 Jul 1986	Gölhisar	MF	14	3	2	2	16	5	5		2006 WL Gençlerbirliği.
30	4	(Turkey)	Ramazan Özalp	16 Oct 1974	Adana	DF	10	1	1		11	1	1		2006 WT Elazığspor.
31	16	(Turkey)	Barış Karaoğlu	21 Dec 1987	Hizan	FW	1		1		2		1		First time professional.
32	8	(Turkey)	Doğan Şengül	15 Sep 1985	Fatih	DF	8		2		10		2		2006 WT Turgutluspor.

Sources: TFF club page and maçkolik team page.

== See also ==
- Football in Turkey
