= Hanefi =

Hanefi may refer to:

== People ==
- Mahmut Hanefi Erdoğdu, Turkish footballer
- Hanefi Mahçiçek, Turkish politician
- Rahmatullah Hanefi, Afghan activist

== See also ==
- Hanefi, Osmancık
- Hanafi
- Kahramanmaraş Hanefi Mahçiçek Stadium
