= 2010–11 Antalyaspor season =

Antalyaspor
2010–11 season
- President: Hasan Akıncıoğlu
- Manager: Mehmet Özdilek
- Stadium: Antalya Atatürk Stadium
- Süper Lig: 11th
- Turkish Cup: Group stage
- Top goalscorer: League: Necati Ateş (13); All: Necati Ateş (13)
Home colours	Away colours	Third colours

The 2010–11 Antalyaspor season was their 3rd consecutive season in the Turkish Super League and their 45th year in existence. They also competed in the Turkish Cup.

== Current squad ==
As of 11 September 2010

Note: Flags indicate national team as defined under FIFA eligibility rules; some limited exceptions apply. Players may hold more than one non-FIFA nationality.

No.	Pos.	Nation	Player
1	GK	TUR	Ömer Çatkıç
5	MF	TUR	Kerem Şeras
6	DF	TUR	Erkan Sekman
7	MF	TUR	Musa Nizam
10	FW	TUR	Necati Ateş
11	FW	TUN	Ali Zitouni
12	MF	FRA	Grégory Proment
15	MF	TUR	Sedat Ağçay
18	GK	TUR	Polat Keser
24	DF	TUR	Deniz Barış

No.	Pos.	Nation	Player
27	DF	BIH	Ivan Radeljić
28	DF	TUR	Yenal Tuncer
29	FW	CIV	Serge Djiehoua
33	GK	CMR	Sammy N'Djock
35	DF	TUR	Tuna Üzümcü
39	MF	TUR	Ilkem Özkaynak
50	FW	TUR	Veysel Cihan
58	MF	TUR	Ertuğrul Arslan
86	FW	BRA	Tita
99	FW	TUR	Kenan Özer

== Competitions ==
=== Süper Lig ===
==== League table ====
Pos	Team	Pld	W	D	L	GF	GA	GD	Pts
9	Kardemir Karabükspor	34	12	8	14	46	53	−7	44
10	Manisaspor	34	13	4	17	49	52	−3	43
11	Antalyaspor	34	10	12	12	41	48	−7	42 (Note: Antalyaspor were ahead of Sivasspor on head-to-head record: Antalyaspor–İstanbul B.B. 1–0, İstanbul B.B.–Antalyaspor 1–1.)
12	İstanbul B.B.	34	12	6	16	40	45	−5	42
13	MKE Ankaragücü	34	10	11	13	52	62	−10	41

Source: tff.org (in Turkish)
Rules for classification: 1) points; 2) goal difference; 3) number of goals scored.

==== Results summary ====
Overall								Home						Away					
Pld	W	D	L	GF	GA	GD	Pts	W	D	L	GF	GA	GD	W	D	L	GF	GA	GD
34	10	12	12	41	48	−7	42	5	7	5	22	22	0	5	5	7	19	26	−7

Source: tff.org

==== Results by matchday ====
Matchday	1	2	3	4	5	6	7	8	9	10	11	12	13	14	15	16	17	18	19	20	21	22	23	24	25	26	27	28	29	30	31	32	33	34
Ground	A	H	H	A	H	A	H	A	H	A	H	A	H	A	H	A	E	H	A	A	H	A	H	A	H	A	H	A	H	A	H	A	H	A
Result	L	D	D	W	W	L	W	W	W	L	D	D	L	L	W	L	D	L	D	D	L	L	L	W	D	D	W	W	D	L	D	D	L	W
Position	18	16	16	12	8	9	8	6	5	5	7	7	8	9	7	9	10	12	12	12	13	12	14	13	13	13	12	11	10	11	12	14	14	12

Source: tff.org
A = Away; H = Home; W = Win; D = Draw; L = Loss
