= 2004–05 Turkish Second League Category A =

Turkish Second League Category A
- Season: 2004–05
- Champions: Sivasspor
- Promoted: Sivasspor, Manisaspor, Kayseri Erciyesspor
- Relegated: Sarıyer, Adanaspor, Fatih Karagümrük
- Matches played: 306
- Goals scored: 827 (2.7 per match)
- Top goalscorer: Okan Yılmaz (25)

The 2004–05 Turkish Second League Category A was the second-level football league of Turkey and the 42nd season since its establishment in 1963–64. At the end of the season in which 18 teams competed in a single group, Sivasspor, Manisaspor and Kayseri Erciyesspor, which finished the league in the first three places, were promoted to the upper league, while Sarıyer, Adanaspor and Fatih Karagümrük, which were in the last three places, were relegated.

== Final standings ==
Pos	Team	Pld	W	D	L	GF	GA	GD	Pts	Qualification or relegation
1	Sivasspor (C, P)	34	23	5	6	58	24	+34	74	Promotion to Süper Lig
2	Manisaspor (P)	34	20	9	5	55	26	+29	69	Promotion to Süper Lig
3	Kayseri Erciyesspor (P)	34	21	5	8	64	46	+18	68	Promotion to Süper Lig
4	Bursaspor	34	18	9	7	61	26	+35	63	
5	Kocaelispor	34	17	11	6	49	28	+21	62	
6	Elazığspor	34	17	6	11	53	45	+8	57	
7	Mersin İdman Yurdu	34	15	8	11	49	53	−4	53	
8	Türk Telekom	34	13	10	11	44	42	+2	49	
9	İstanbul B.B.	34	12	10	12	34	35	−1	46	
10	Mardinspor	34	12	9	13	33	34	−1	45	
11	Altay	34	11	7	16	41	49	−8	40	
12	Çanakkale Dardanelspor	34	11	6	17	54	57	−3	39	
13	Karşıyaka	34	11	5	18	41	50	−9	38	
14	Antalyaspor	34	9	10	15	42	45	−3	37	
15	Yozgatspor	34	8	9	17	48	64	−16	33	
16	Sarıyer (R)	34	7	6	21	32	56	−24	27 (Note: Head-to-head record: Sarıyer 1–0 Adanaspor, Adanaspor 2–2 Sarıyer (Sarıyer ahead))	Relegation to Turkish Second League Category B
17	Adanaspor (R)	34	7	6	21	38	70	−32	27	Relegation to Turkish Second League Category B
18	Fatih Karagümrük (R)	34	6	5	23	31	77	−46	23	Relegation to Turkish Second League Category B

Source: TFF
Rules for classification: 1) points; 2) goal difference; 3) number of goals scored.
(C) Champions; (P) Promoted; (R) Relegated

== Results ==
Home \ Away	ADA	ALT	ANT	BUR	ÇDA	ELA	FKG	İBB	KSK	KER	KOC	MAN	MAR	MİY	SAR	SİV	TTE	YOZ
Adanaspor		3–2	1–5	1–2	1–5	4–3	4–0	2–0	2–4	0–1	0–1	0–4	3–1	1–1	2–2	0–1	1–0	1–1
Altay	1–0		1–1	1–1	0–1	1–2	1–2	1–0	1–0	1–2	2–2	2–3	2–0	1–0	0–2	0–3	3–3	2–0
Antalyaspor	0–0	0–1		2–2	2–1	2–0	4–1	0–0	3–1	3–3	1–2	0–0	1–1	1–1	0–1	0–2	2–3	1–3
Bursaspor	4–1	1–1	2–1		3–1	4–0	1–1	2–0	3–2	0–0	0–1	1–2	2–0	5–0	3–0	1–0	4–0	0–1
Çanakkale Dardanelspor	4–3	2–5	1–3	0–3		1–0	4–3	0–0	1–3	2–2	2–2	0–1	1–1	4–0	2–1	0–1	1–2	6–3
Elazığspor	3–0	4–1	2–1	0–2	2–0		2–0	4–2	2–1	2–0	2–1	1–0	1–0	2–3	3–1	0–1	1–1	1–0
Fatih Karagümrük	1–1	1–0	1–2	1–3	0–3	1–2		1–3	1–1	1–4	0–2	1–1	1–0	1–3	1–0	2–3	0–2	2–1
İstanbul B.B.	4–1	1–1	1–0	0–2	2–0	3–2	2–0		2–1	0–0	0–0	0–1	1–1	2–0	2–1	0–0	0–3	2–0
Karşıyaka	1–3	0–2	3–2	1–3	2–1	2–2	3–1	0–1		4–1	0–1	2–1	0–2	0–0	2–0	1–3	0–1	2–0
Kayseri Erciyesspor	3–1	3–2	3–2	1–0	1–5	2–2	4–1	1–0	2–0		2–0	0–1	3–1	0–2	2–0	1–2	2–1	4–1
Kocaelispor	3–1	2–0	1–0	2–2	1–0	0–1	5–1	1–0	1–0	0–1		0–0	1–2	3–1	2–0	2–1	4–1	1–1
Manisaspor	1–0	1–1	3–1	1–0	0–1	3–0	3–2	2–2	3–0	1–4	0–0		0–0	3–0	1–0	2–2	2–2	5–2
Mardinspor	3–2	2–0	1–0	0–0	0–0	2–1	3–0	2–0	0–0	1–2	0–2	0–1		0–2	0–0	1–0	2–2	2–0
Mersin İdman Yurdu	0–0	2–1	0–1	0–0	3–2	2–2	6–1	1–0	2–1	2–1	2–2	1–4	2–1		1–0	0–3	1–0	2–2
Sarıyer	1–0	0–1	0–1	0–3	1–1	0–1	2–1	1–1	1–2	1–2	2–1	0–2	0–1	3–4		1–1	1–0	2–1
Sivasspor	3–1	3–0	2–0	2–0	2–0	1–1	2–0	1–2	1–0	3–1	0–0	0–1	2–3	2–0	2–1		2–1	4–1
Türk Telekom	3–0	1–0	0–0	2–0	1–3	1–1	0–0	2–0	0–0	1–2	1–1	1–0	1–0	3–2	2–1	1–2		2–3
Yozgatspor	4–0	1–3	1–1	1–1	4–2	2–1	0–1	1–1	1–2	3–4	2–2	0–2	2–1	1–3	4–4	0–1	1–1	

Source: TFF
Legend: Blue = home team win; Yellow = draw; Red = away team win.

== Top goalscorers ==
Rank	Player	Club	Goals
1	(Turkey) Okan Yılmaz	Bursaspor	25
2	(Turkey) Taner Demirbaş	Kayseri Erciyesspor	22
3	(Turkey) Mohamed Ali Kurtuluş	Sivasspor	20
4	(Turkey) Engin Öztonga	Kocaelispor	16
4	(Turkey) Mehmet Şen	Çanakkale Dardanelspor	16
4	(Turkey) Taner Gülleri	Antalyaspor	16
7	(Turkey) Erol Kapusuz	Kayseri Erciyesspor	13
7	(Turkey) Mehmet Yıldız	Sivasspor	13
7	(Turkey) Ümit Ozan Kazmaz	Adanaspor	13
10	(Turkey) Hasan Kabze	Çanakkale Dardanelspor	12
