= Serdar Kurtuluş =

Turkish footballer

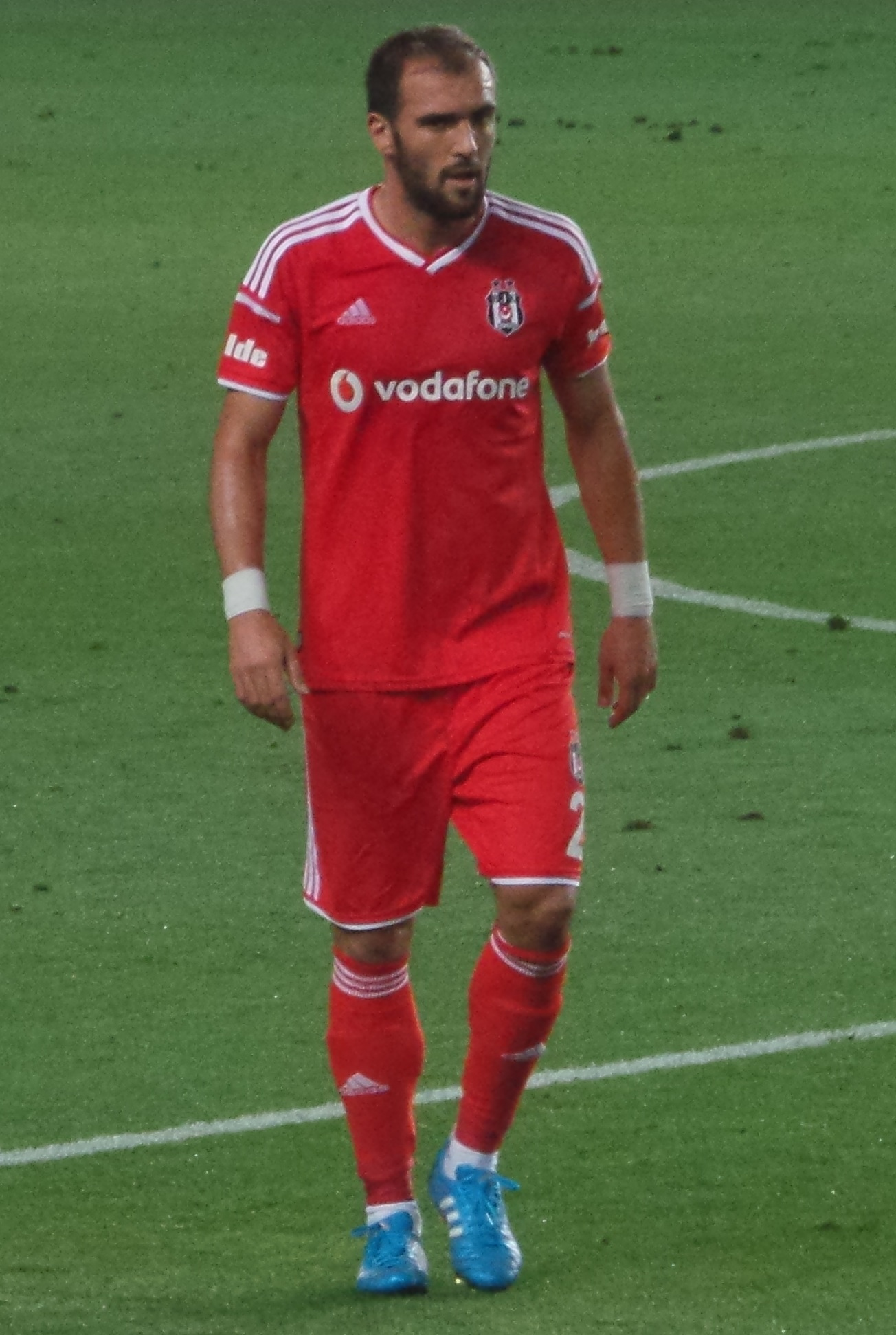
- Kurtuluş in 2014

Personal information
- Full name: Serdar Berat Kurtuluş
- Date of birth: 23 July 1987 (age 39)
- Place of birth: Bursa, Turkey
- Height: 1.84 m (6 ft 1/2 in)
- Position: Right back

Youth career
- 2000–2004: Bursaspor

Senior career*
Years	Team	Apps	(Gls)
2004–2006	Bursaspor	33	(2)
2006–2009	Beşiktaş	56	(0)
2009–2013	Gaziantepspor	106	(5)
2013–2016	Beşiktaş	52	(0)
2016–2018	Bursaspor	6	(0)

International career
2005	Turkey U18	20	(1)
2005–2007	Turkey U21	5	(0)
2007–2013	Turkey	6	(0)
- * Club domestic league appearances and goals

Serdar Kurtuluş (born 23 July 1987) is a Turkish former footballer who played as a right back.

== Career ==
=== Early years ===
He started playing football in Bursaspor youth team. He made his first team debut on 28 August 2005 against Mardinspor, when he was 17 years old. He scored his only goal against İstanbul Büyükşehir Belediyespor on 2 April 2006. Bursaspor won League A that season and promoted to Süper Lig.

He was transferred from Bursaspor by Jean Tigana during his re-generation plan for team in 2006–2007 season at the age of 18. Beşiktaş paid Bursaspor $1,000,000 plus Sinan Kaloğlu and Eser Yağmur as exchange players for this transfer. He was playing as a right full-back in Bursaspor, but Jean Tigana tried to adapt him to play as a defensive midfielder as well. He would not be able to score a goal for his team, however, has been very successful in his first season in Beşiktaş as he built his regular place in team's line-up He was sent to Gaziantepspor as part of a part exchange deal. This transfer has been regarded as one of the numerous transfer blunders made by Yıldırım Demirören.

He started his national team career on 11 January 2005 in a U18 friendly against Belgium. He attended 2005 Mediterranean Games, and played in the final game against Spain. He was selected for the U21 national team on 15 November 2006 for the friendly with Denmark. After his success in Beşiktaş, Fatih Terim called-up him in the national team for friendly matches. He played his first national match against Brazil on 5 June 2007.

== Personal life ==
Serdar's brother, Serkan Kurtuluş, is also a professional footballer.

== Honours ==
Beşiktaş J.K.

- Süper Lig: 2008–09, 2015–16
- Turkish Cup: 2006–07, 2008–09
- Turkish Super Cup: 2006

Bursaspor

- TFF First League: 2005–06

Turkey U21

- Mediterranean Games Runner-up 2005
