= Birol Aksancak =

Turkish footballer (born 1979)

Personal information
- Date of birth: April 8, 1979 (age 47)
- Place of birth: Güdül, Turkey
- Height: 1.85 m (6 ft 1 in)
- Position: Winger

Youth career
- 1990–1997: Ankaragücü

Senior career*
| Years | Team | Apps | (Gls) |
| 1997–1998 | Asasspor | 26 | (6) |
| 1998–2000 | Ankaragücü | 22 | (8) |
| 2000–2001 | → Karabükspor (loan) | 11 | (9) |
| 2001 | → Ankaraspor (loan) | 13 | (8) |
| 2001–2002 | Konyaspor | 9 | (1) |
| 2002–2004 | Ankaraspor | 25 | (12) |
| 2004 | Başakşehir | 16 | (16) |
| 2004–2005 | Ankaragücü | 11 | (2) |
| 2005 | Vestel Manisaspor | 12 | (4) |
| 2005–2008 | Ankaragücü | 13 | (0) |
| 2006 | → Istanbulspor (loan) | 10 | (2) |
| 2006–2007 | → Karşıyaka S.K. (loan) | 21 | (1) |
| 2006–2007 | → Şanlıurfaspor (loan) | 8 | (0) |
| 2007–2008 | → Turanspor (loan) | 3 | (0) |
| 2008–2009 | Akçaabat Sebatspor | 7 | (0) |
| 2009–2010 | Bozüyükspor | 6 | (0) |

International career^{‡}
| 1997–1998 | Turkey U18 | 3 | (0) |
| 1999 | Turkey U19 | 1 | (1) |
| 2000 | Turkey U21 | 2 | (0) |
- * Club domestic league appearances and goals as of 27 May 2021 ‡ National team caps and goals as of 27 May 2021

Birol Aksancak (born April 8, 1979) is a retired Turkish footballer who played as a winger.

== Career ==
Aksancak is a youth product of Ankaragücü, and had three separate stints in the club, and spent various seasons on loan with clubs in the TFF First League. He spent most of his career between the Süper Lig and the TFF First League. He was a part of Ankaragücü's greatest European success, scoring a goal for them in a 1–0 win against Atlético Madrid in the 1999–2000 UEFA Cup.

== Personal life ==
On 10 August 2008 Aksancak was a passenger in a car accident, where all four other passengers - his twin brothers and two friends - died. Aksancak was the only survivor of the accident.
