= Zülküf Özer =

Turkish footballer

Zülküf
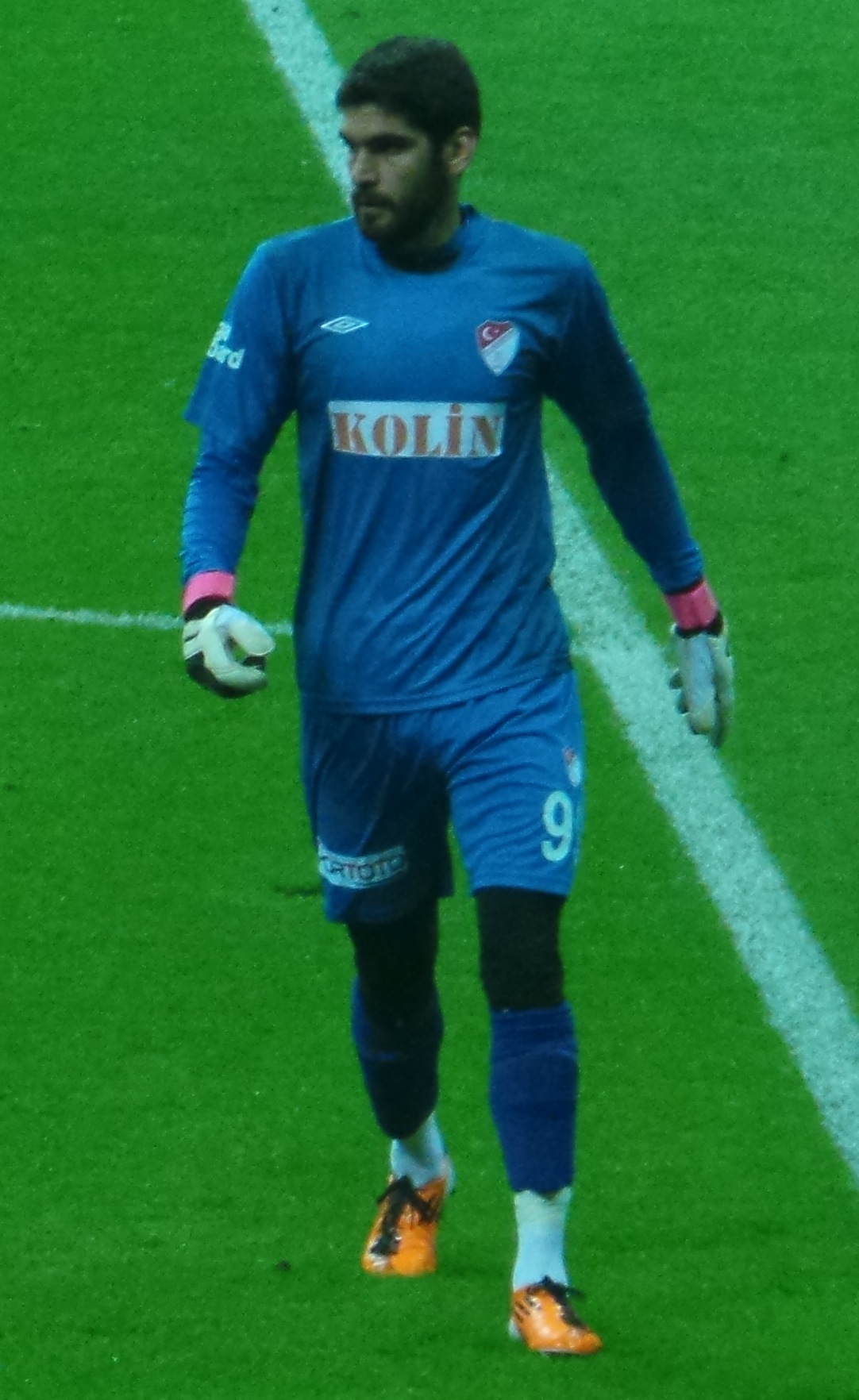

Personal information
- Full name: Zülküf Özer
- Date of birth: 10 May 1988 (age 38)
- Place of birth: Diyarbakır, Turkey
- Height: 1.86 m (6 ft 1 in)
- Position: Goalkeeper

Team information
- Current team: 12 Bingölspor

Youth career
- 2005–2007: Erganispor
- 2007–2009: Mardinspor

Senior career*
Years	Team	Apps	(Gls)
2009–2013	Adanaspor	37	(0)
2013–2014	Elazığspor	12	(0)
2014–2015	Kayseri Erciyesspor	21	(0)
2016	Alanyaspor	0	(0)
2016–2017	Adana Demirspor	5	(0)
2017–2018	Amed	13	(0)
2019–2021	Bandırmaspor	42	(0)
2021–2022	Bayburt Özel İdarespor	39	(0)
2022–2023	Menemenspor	12	(0)
2023	Diyarbekirspor	4	(0)
2023	→ Bayrampaşa (loan)	9	(0)
2023	12 Bingölspor	9	(0)
- * Club domestic league appearances and goals as of 20 December 2023

Zülküf Özer (born 10 May 1988) is a Turkish footballer who plays as a goalkeeper for amateur club 12 Bingölspor.
