= Kerim Zengin =

Turkish professional footballer (born 1985)

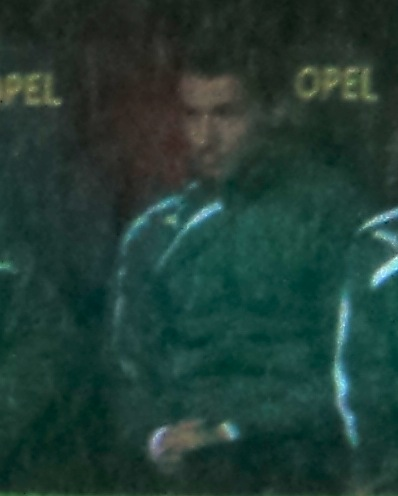
- Zengin in 2014

Personal information
- Date of birth: 13 April 1985 (age 41)
- Place of birth: Mersin, Turkey
- Height: 1.78 m (5 ft 10 in)
- Positions: Right-back; winger

Youth career
- 1999–2001: Mersin İdmanyurdu
- 2001–2003: Fenerbahçe

Senior career*
Years	Team	Apps	(Gls)
2003–2009	Fenerbahçe	8	(0)
2004–2005	→ Mersin İdmanyurdu (loan)	21	(9)
2007–2009	→ İstanbul B.B. (loan)	46	(3)
2009–2010	Antalyaspor	19	(1)
2010–2011	Karabükspor	26	(0)
2011–2012	Sivasspor	2	(0)
2012–2013	Gaziantepspor	4	(0)
2013	Gençlerbirliği	2	(0)
2013–2015	Akhisar Belediyespor	25	(3)
2015–2018	Karabükspor	43	(0)

International career
2001	Turkey U17	10	(3)
2002	Turkey U18	9	(0)
2002–2004	Turkey U19	22	(6)
2004–2006	Turkey U20	14	(5)
2006	Turkey U21	1	(0)
- * Club domestic league appearances and goals as of 2 June 2017

Kerim Zengin (born 13 April 1985) is a Turkish former professional footballer who played as a right-back or winger. He is a former youth international, earning caps at levels from the U-17s up to the Turkey national under-21 football team.

== Club career ==
Zengin began his career with local club Mersin İdmanyurdu in 1999. Originally a forward, he spent two years with his hometown club before moving to Istanbul-giants Fenerbahçe. Most of his time with the club was spent either out on loan to clubs such as Mersin İdmanyurdu and İstanbul Büyükşehir Belediyespor, or with the youth teams. He made eight appearances for the club during his six-year tenure. Antalyaspor transferred him in 2009, with Zengin contributing one goal in 19 appearances. He was transferred to Karabükspor the following season. After a one-year spell with Karabükspor, he moved to the league rival Sivasspor.

== Honors ==
Fenerbahçe

- Süper Lig: 2006–07
