= Mohamed Ali Kurtuluş =

Turkish association football player

Personal information
- Date of birth: 29 August 1974 (age 52)
- Place of birth: Ghent, Belgium
- Height: 1.76 m (5 ft 9 in)
- Positions: Midfielder; forward

Youth career
- AA Gent

Senior career*
Years	Team	Apps	(Gls)
	AA Gent	12	(0)
1998-1999	Sakaryaspor	37	(5)
1999-2000	Denizlispor	23	(5)
2000-2002	Sakaryaspor	59	(17)
2002-2003	Çaykur Rizespor	26	(4)
2003-2005	Sivasspor	63	(33)
2006-2007	Diyarbakırspor	49	(22)
2007-2009	Sivasspor	53	(12)
2010	Adanaspor	7	(1)
- * Club domestic league appearances and goals

Mohamed Ali Kurtuluş (born 29 August 1974) is a Belgian retired footballer who is last known to have played as a midfielder or attacker for Adanaspor.

== Career ==
Ali Kurtuluş started his career with Belgian top flight side AA Gent, where he made 12 league appearances and scored 0 goals. On 28 October 1993, Ali Kurtuluş debuted for AA Gent during a 0-0 draw with Standard. Before the second half of 1997-98, he signed for Sakaryaspor in the Turkish second division, helping them achieve promotion to the Turkish top flight. In 1999, he signed for Turkish top flight club Denizlispor. In 2000, Ali Kurtuluş returned to Turkish second division club Sakaryaspor. He has a son named Ozan Kurtulus.

In 2007, he signed for Sivasspor in the Turkish top flight, helping them achieve 2nd place, where he said, "There are a few places where alcohol is sold in the city, but the trainer knows the owners of those bars. If a player goes out or drink, the coach is informed in no time. The dullness of the city contributes to the success of the club. The players always troops together at the club and such a major togetherness is created." Before the second half of 2009-10, Ali Kurtuluş signed for Turkish second division team Adanaspor.
