= Nihat Baştürk =

Turkish footballer

Personal information
- Date of birth: October 22, 1973 (age 53)
- Place of birth: Afyon, Turkey
- Height: 1.70 m (5 ft 7 in)
- Position: Midfielder

Team information
- Current team: Afjet Afyonspor

Youth career
- 1990–1992: Kemerspor

Senior career*
Years	Team	Apps	(Gls)
1992–1993	Kemerspor	29	(4)
1993–2005	Gençlerbirliği	255	(10)
1993–1994	→ Petrol Ofisi (loan)	22	(2)
2005–2006	Antalyaspor	33	(1)
2007–2008	Fethiyespor	49	(1)
2008–2010	Afyonkarahisarspor	22	(6)
2010–2012	Emirdağspor		
2012–2013	Afyonkarahisarspor		
2013	Şuhut Hisar Belediyespor		
2013–	Afjet Afyonspor		
- * Club domestic league appearances and goals

Nihat Baştürk (born 23 October 1973 in Afyon, Turkey) is a Turkish footballer who plays for Turkish amateur-side Afjet Afyonspor. He spent the majority of his career with Gençlerbirliği, playing 12 seasons of Süper Lig football in Turkey. The midfielder then had a season's stint with Antalyaspor in Turkey's First League (Second Tier Football) before spending a couple seasons with Second League side, Fethiyespor. For the 2008/2009 season, the 35-year-old joined another Second League side, Afyonkarahisarspor, the club of his hometown.

== International career ==
Baştürk was an unused substitute for Turkey's 1998 FIFA World Cup qualification group match against Wales on 20 August 1997.

== Honours ==
- Gençlerbirliği
  - Turkish Cup (1): 2001
