= Timur Yanyalı =

Turkish footballer

Personal information
- Date of birth: August 26, 1975 (age 51)
- Place of birth: Munich, West Germany
- Height: 1.85 m (6 ft 1 in)
- Position: Defender

Youth career
- 1860 Munich

Senior career*
| Years | Team | Apps | (Gls) |
| 1994–1995 | 1860 Munich | 16 | (0) |
| 1995–2000 | İstanbulspor | 94 | (2) |
| 2000–2004 | Adanaspor | 47 | (1) |
| 2004–2005 | Sivasspor | 6 | (0) |
| 2005–2006 | Yozgatspor | 20 | (1) |
| 2007–2008 | Lüleburgazspor | 14 | (1) |
| Total | | 197 | (5) |
- * Club domestic league appearances and goals

Timur Yanyalı (born August 26, 1975) is a Turkish former footballer who played as a defender.

In the 2000–01 season he was suspended from football after doping test.
