= Ali Öztürk (footballer, born 1986) =

Turkish footballer

Personal information
- Date of birth: 28 July 1986 (age 40)
- Place of birth: Gölhisar, Turkey
- Height: 1.68 m (5 ft 6 in)
- Position: Forward

Senior career*
Years	Team	Apps	(Gls)
2002	Beşiktaş		
2003–2008	Gençlerbirliği	14	(1)
2005–2006	→ Mardinspor	14	(1)
2006–2008	→ Mersin İdman Yurdu	33	(11)
2008	→ Bozüyükspor	12	(1)
2008–2011	Bozüyükspor	17	(4)
2011–2012	Balıkesirspor	10	(4)
2012–2013	Kızılcahamamspor	3	(0)
2013	İskenderunspor 1967	12	(0)
2013–2014	Muratpaşa Belediyespor	21	(4)

International career
- Turkey U19
- * Club domestic league appearances and goals

Ali Öztürk (born 28 July 1986) is a Turkish footballer who last played for Muratpaşa Belediyespor. He has previously played in the Turkish Süper Lig competition for Gençlerbirliği.

He was top scorer in the 2004 UEFA Under 19 Championship.

He was named in the 2005 FIFA World Youth Championship squad for Turkey.
