= Kahramanmaraş Hanefi Mahçiçek Stadium =

Stadium in south-east Turkey

Coordinates: 37°33′27.62″N 36°56′04.85″E

Hanefi Mahçiçek (stadium) was built in 2001 and has a capacity of 12,000. It is located in Kahramanmaraş in south-east Turkey. The stadium is used by Kahramanmaraşspor football club. The stadium is named after the club's ex-chairman and Kahramanmaraş's ex-mayor Hanefi Mahçiçek.

During the 2023 Kahramanmaraş Earthquake the stadium was used as an aid distribution point.
