= Hakkı Hocaoğlu =

Turkish footballer and manager

Personal information
- Full name: Mehmet Hakkı Hocaoğlu
- Date of birth: 1 February 1975 (age 51)
- Place of birth: Hatay, Turkey
- Height: 1.82 m (5 ft 11 1/2 in)
- Position: Centre back

Senior career*
Years	Team	Apps	(Gls)
1993–1994	İskenderunspor	30	(7)
1994–1995	Hatayspor	20	(3)
1995–1996	İDÇ Genel Müdürlüğüspor		
1996–2004	Samsunspor	86	(4)
2004	Kayseri Erciyesspor	15	(1)
2004–2007	Sivasspor	76	(8)
2007	Kocaelispor	1	(0)
2007–2008	Samsunspor	26	(2)
2008	Adanaspor	5	(1)
2009	Giresunspor	2	(0)
2009–2010	Samsunspor	4	(0)

Managerial career
- 2010–2011: Anadolu Üsküdar
- 2011: Sivasspor A2
- 2012–2013: Sivasspor (head of youth)
- 2013: 1930 Bafraspor
- 2014: Payasspor
- 2015: Hatayspor (assistant)
- 2016: Atakum Belediyespor
- 2017: Çarşambaspor
- 2018: Sinopspor
- 2019: Atakum Belediyespor
- 2019: Erbaaspor
- 2021: Kırşehir Futbol
- 2022–2023: Osmaniyespor FK
- 2023–2024: Amasyaspor FK
- 2024: Edirnespor
- 2026: Hatayspor
- * Club domestic league appearances and goals

Mehmet Hakkı Hocaoğlu (born 1 February 1975) is a Turkish football coach and a former player.

He previously played for Sivasspor in the Süper Lig.
