= 2005–06 TFF Lig A =

4th season of TFF First League

Lig A
- Season: 2005–06
- Champions: Bursaspor
- Promoted: Bursaspor, Antalyaspor, Sakaryaspor
- Relegated: Mersin İdman Yurdu, Yozgatspor, Çanakkale Dardanelspor
- Matches played: 307
- Goals scored: 811 (2.64 per match)
- Top goalscorer: Taner Demirbaş; Ufuk Ateş (20)

The 2005–06 TFF Lig A (known as Iddaa Lig A for sponsoring reasons) was the second-level football league of Turkey and the 43rd season since its establishment in 1963–64. At the end of the season, in which 18 teams competed in a single group, Bursaspor and Antalyaspor, which finished the league in the first two places, and the play-off winner Sakaryaspor were promoted to the upper league, while Mersin İdman Yurdu, Yozgatspor and Çanakkale Dardanelspor, which were in the last three places, were relegated.

== Final standings ==
Pos	Team	Pld	W	D	L	GF	GA	GD	Pts	Qualification or relegation
1	Bursaspor (C, P)	34	21	8	5	56	26	+30	71	Promotion to Süper Lig
2	Antalyaspor (P)	34	20	7	7	68	34	+34	67	Promotion to Süper Lig
3	Altay	34	18	10	6	54	39	+15	64	Qualification for promotion playoffs
4	Sakaryaspor (O, P)	34	17	9	8	54	36	+18	60	Qualification for promotion playoffs
5	İstanbulspor	34	16	6	12	58	35	+23	54 (Note: Head-to-head record: İstanbulspor 0–1 Orduspor, Orduspor 0–3 İstanbulspor (İstanbulspor ahead))	Qualification for promotion playoffs
6	Orduspor	34	14	12	8	53	42	+11	54	Qualification for promotion playoffs
7	İstanbul BB	34	13	13	8	43	31	+12	52	
8	Türk Telekom	34	11	12	11	40	40	0	45	
9	Kocaelispor	34	11	12	11	41	41	0	45	
10	Elazığspor	34	11	12	11	40	45	−5	45	
11	Mardinspor	34	11	10	13	38	41	−3	43	
12	Gaziantep BB	34	12	5	17	47	52	−5	41	
13	Karşıyaka	34	10	11	13	47	49	−2	41	
14	Uşakspor	34	11	7	16	40	54	−14	40	
15	Akçaabat Sebatspor	34	7	13	14	37	54	−17	34	
16	Mersin İdman Yurdu (R)	34	6	11	17	30	54	−24	29	Relegation to Turkish Second League Category B
17	Yozgatspor (R)	34	6	10	18	32	55	−23	28	Relegation to Turkish Second League Category B
18	Çanakkale Dardanelspor (R)	34	5	4	25	23	73	−50	19	Relegation to Turkish Second League Category B

Source: TFF
Rules for classification: 1) points; 2) goal difference; 3) number of goals scored.
(C) Champions; (O) Play-off winners; (P) Promoted; (R) Relegated

== Results ==
Home \ Away	AKÇ	ALT	ANT	BUR	ÇDA	ELA	GBB	İBB	İST	KSK	KOC	MAR	MİY	ORD	SAK	TTE	UŞA	YOZ
Akçaabat Sebatspor		3–1	0–5	2–2	3–0	1–1	0–1	2–1	1–1	1–1	0–0	1–1	0–2	1–2	3–3	0–2	1–1	1–1
Altay	2–1		2–1	0–1	5–1	1–1	2–0	2–1	1–0	1–1	3–1	1–1	4–0	2–1	2–1	2–2	0–2	2–1
Antalyaspor	3–0	4–1		0–1	4–0	6–0	3–1	1–2	2–1	2–0	2–0	0–2	2–1	1–1	4–2	2–2	2–0	2–1
Bursaspor	3–0	1–2	1–2		1–1	0–0	3–0	2–0	2–1	3–1	1–0	2–0	3–0	2–0	1–2	0–0	3–1	2–0
Çanakkale Dardanelspor	0–3	3–4	0–1	2–4		1–1	2–1	1–3	0–5	0–2	2–0	2–1	0–0	0–1	0–1	2–0	0–1	2–2
Elazığspor	2–0	1–1	2–0	2–0	0–1		1–2	0–2	0–0	3–2	0–0	1–1	3–0	1–1	2–1	3–1	0–1	2–1
Gaziantep B.B.	2–1	0–2	1–2	1–2	2–0	1–3		2–1	2–3	1–0	1–1	3–0	0–0	3–0	2–2	4–2	1–2	2–1
İstanbul B.B.	0–0	1–2	1–1	1–1	3–0	0–0	1–0		0–1	2–1	3–3	2–2	2–0	0–0	1–0	1–1	0–1	2–0
İstanbulspor	1–2	0–1	2–0	1–2	2–0	3–1	2–1	0–2		0–2	3–0	2–1	2–0	0–1	1–1	2–0	6–1	3–1
Karşıyaka	1–1	0–1	1–1	0–1	7–2	2–1	0–3	0–0	2–5		0–3	2–0	1–0	1–0	2–2	1–1	1–0	5–2
Kocaelispor	4–1	1–1	1–1	0–2	1–0	2–1	2–0	1–3	0–0	2–1		3–0	0–0	4–2	0–3	0–1	0–0	2–0
Mardinspor	1–1	3–0	0–3	1–1	2–0	1–3	4–1	2–0	1–0	1–1	1–1		1–0	1–1	0–2	0–0	2–0	2–0
Mersin İdman Yurdu	3–2	1–1	2–4	1–1	3–0	1–2	3–2	1–1	2–2	1–1	1–3	0–2		0–1	0–2	1–1	2–1	0–0
Orduspor	2–1	1–1	2–2	3–1	4–0	2–2	1–1	0–1	0–3	1–1	1–3	2–0	4–1		2–2	3–0	2–1	1–1
Sakaryaspor	0–1	2–1	1–2	0–1	1–0	1–0	3–1	1–1	1–0	4–3	2–0	2–1	2–0	0–0		0–0	4–0	2–1
Türk Telekom	0–1	1–1	0–0	1–2	1–0	7–0	2–1	0–0	1–4	1–0	2–2	2–1	1–2	2–3	1–0		1–0	2–0
Uşakspor	4–1	1–1	2–3	1–1	2–0	1–0	0–3	3–3	3–1	2–3	1–1	0–1	1–1	2–4	1–2	2–1		1–0
Yozgatspor	1–1	0–1	1–0	0–3	2–1	1–1	1–1	0–2	1–1	1–1	2–0	2–1	2–1	1–4	2–2	0–1	3–1	

Source: TFF
Legend: Blue = home team win; Yellow = draw; Red = away team win.

== Promotion play-offs ==
Promotion play-offs were organized in 19 Mayıs Stadium in Ankara between May 20 and May 24

Semi-finals
20 May 2006, 20:00
Altay	1
Orduspor	0
21 May 2006, 20:00
Sakaryaspor	2 (7)
İstanbulspor	2 (5)

Final
24 May 2006, 20:00
Altay	1
Sakaryaspor	4

== Top goalscorers ==
Rank	Player	Club	Goals
1	(Turkey) Taner Demirbaş	Sakaryaspor	20
1	(Turkey) Ufuk Ateş	Altay	20
3	(Turkey) Coşkun Birdal	Antalyaspor	18
4	(Turkey) Fazlı Ulusoy	Altay	15
5	(Turkey) Erol Kapusuz	İstanbul BB	13
5	(Turkey) Mehmet Yıldız	İstanbulspor	13
5	(Turkey) Serdar Sinik	Türk Telekom	13
8	(Turkey) Murat Bölükbaş	Sakaryaspor	12
8	(Turkey) Özgür Karakaya	Kocaelispor	12
10	(Turkey) Hakan Keleş	Antalyaspor	11
