= Ümit Tütünci =

Turkish footballer

Personal information
- Date of birth: 1 May 1984 (age 42)
- Place of birth: Trabzon, Turkey
- Height: 1.78 m (5 ft 10 in)
- Position: Forward

Youth career
- Trabzonspor
- Köprülü Bahçeli Spor
- –2003: Gençlerbirliği

Senior career*
Years	Team	Apps	(Gls)
2003–2008	Hacettepe	1	(0)
2005	→ Zonguldakspor (loan)		
2005–2006	→ Karşıyaka (loan)	5	(0)
2006	→ Türk Telekom (loan)		
2007–2008	→ Orduspor (loan)	1	(2)
2008–2009	Gençlerbirliği	0	(0)
2008–2009	→ Kartalspor (loan)	15	(4)
2009	→ Hacettepe (loan)	13	(2)
2009–2010	Gaziantepspor	12	(0)
2010–2011	Giresunspor	12	(4)
2011	Kayseri Erciyesspor	10	(1)
2011–2012	Boluspor	14	(4)
2012	TKİ Tavşanlı Linyitspor	29	(13)
2013–2014	Adanaspor	26	(4)
2014	Denizlispor	6	(1)
2014	Orduspor	6	(1)
2015	Göztepe	8	(1)
2015–2017	Elazığspor	28	(6)
2017–2018	Manisa BB	9	(0)
- * Club domestic league appearances and goals

Ümit Tütünci (born 1 May 1984) is a Turkish former professional footballer who played as a forward.
