= Mutlu Dervişoğlu =

Turkish footballer

Personal information
- Date of birth: 6 November 1977 (age 48)
- Place of birth: Akçaabat, Turkey
- Height: 1.80 m (5 ft 11 in)
- Positions: Attacking midfielder; striker

Team information
- Current team: Akhisar Belediyespor (assistant)

Youth career
- 1994–1997: İdmanocağı

Senior career*
Years	Team	Apps	(Gls)
1997–1998	Gümüşhanespor	32	(28)
1998–2000	Erzurumspor	44	(12)
2000–2001	Yimpaş Yozgatspor	18	(4)
2001–2002	Adanaspor	12	(3)
2003	Akçaabat Sebatspor	8	(2)
2004	Gümüşhanespor	12	(6)
2004–2005	Yimpaş Yozgatspor	28	(11)
2005–2006	Giresunspor	25	(6)
2006	Akçaabat Sebatspor	0	(0)
2007	Siirtspor	6	(0)
2007–2010	Akçaabat Sebatspor	52	(13)
2010–2011	Ofspor		
2011	Ankara Jandarmagücü		

Managerial career
- 2011–2012: 1461 Trabzon U17
- 2012–2014: Trabzonspor U16 & U14
- 2014–2015: Karabükspor U16
- 2015–2016: Kayserispor (assistant)
- 2016–: Akhisar Belediyespor (assistant)
- * Club domestic league appearances and goals

Mutlu Dervişoğlu (born 6 November 1977) is a retired Turkish football player and is currently the assistant manager of Akhisar Belediyespor.

He played either as an attacking midfielder or as a striker. He played in Turkish Super League several seasons with Erzurumspor, Adanaspor, and Yimpaş Yozgatspor. His best season was his debut season as a professional player, when he scored 28 goals in 32 games in TFF Third League for Gümüşhanespor. That was a huge achievement given that he started playing football only when he was 17 years old. Until then, he was a basketball player playing for the local İdmanocağı basketball team. In 1994, he shifted to amateur football team of İdmanocağı. Without doubt his jumping and timing skills as a basketball player helped him to become a powerhouse forward in football. He is a native of Akçaabat and speaks English besides his native language.
