= Ömer Közen =

Turkish footballer

Personal information
- Full name: Ömer Közen
- Date of birth: 21 August 1981 (age 45)
- Place of birth: Istanbul, Turkey
- Height: 1.80 m (5 ft 11 in)
- Position: Midfielder

Senior career*
| Years | Team | Apps | (Gls) |
| 1999–2002 | Gaziosmanpaşa | | |
| 2002–2003 | Gaziantepspor | 7 | (0) |
| 2003–2008 | Kayseri Erciyesspor | 79 | (4) |
| 2006–2007 | → İstanbulspor (loan) | 28 | (2) |
| 2008 | Eskişehirspor | 8 | (0) |
| 2008–2009 | Manisaspor | 11 | (0) |
| 2009–2010 | Giresunspor | 6 | (0) |
| 2010 | Sarıyer | | |
- * Club domestic league appearances and goals

Ömer Közen (born 21 August 1981, in Istanbul), is a Turkish footballer.
