= Engin Öztonga =

Turkish footballer

Engin Öztonga (born 10 August 1978 in Kullar) is a Turkish retired footballer who played as a midfielder.

Öztonga previously played for Kocaelispor and Gaziantepspor in the Turkish Super Lig.

== Honours ==
- Kocaelispor
  - Turkish Cup (2): 1997, 2002
