= Turkey national under-19 football team =

National association football team

Turkey Under-19
- Nickname: Genç Milliler
- Association: Turkish Football Federation (TFF)
- Confederation: UEFA (Europe)
- Head coach: Uğur İnceman
- Most caps: Selçuk İnan (34)
- Top scorer: Ali Öztürk, İlhan Parlak (14)
First colours	Second colours

First international
- Turkey 2–0 Slovakia (25 April 1999)

Biggest win
- Turkey 10–0 San Marino (Charleroi, Belgium; 10 October 2004)

Biggest defeat
- Portugal 6–1 Turkey (Tbilisi, Georgia; 29 May 2015)

European Championship
- Appearances: 7 (first in 2004)
- Best result: Runners-up: 2004

The Turkey national under-19 football team is the national under-19 football team of Turkey and is controlled by the Turkish Football Federation. The team competes in the UEFA European Under-19 Football Championship, held every year.

The Under-19 UEFA tournament originally began as the FIFA Junior Tournament between 1948 and 1954. It has since been renamed a number of times, most notably referred to as the UEFA European U-18 Championship between 1981 and 2001. The tournament was renamed as the UEFA European U-19 Championship in 2002, but importantly the overall statistics are collated from 1948. In addition, during even-numbered years, the top five teams from the respective UEFA European Under-19 Football Championship qualify for the FIFA U-20 World Cup held the following year.

== Competitive record ==
=== UEFA European U-19 Championship record* ===
Edition	Round	MP	W	D**	L	GF	GA
(Norway) 2002	Qualifying round	4	1	1	2	7	8
(Liechtenstein) 2003	First qualifying round	3	1	1	1	3	3
(Switzerland) 2004	Runner-up^{Q}	5	2	1	2	10	10
(Northern Ireland) 2005	First qualifying round	3	1	1	1	13	5
(Poland) 2006	Group stage	3	0	1	2	9	12
(Austria) 2007	Elite round	3	1	1	1	3	3
(Czech Republic) 2008	Elite round	3	1	0	2	2	7
(Ukraine) 2009	Group stage	3	0	1	2	2	4
(France) 2010	Elite round	3	2	0	1	6	4
(Romania) 2011	Group stage	3	1	1	1	4	3
(Estonia) 2012	Elite round	3	1	0	2	6	6
(Lithuania) 2013	Group stage	3	1	0	2	6	6
(Hungary) 2014	Elite round	3	2	1	0	7	5
(Greece) 2015	Elite round	3	0	0	3	2	13
(Germany) 2016	Elite round	3	2	1	0	7	3
(Georgia (country)) 2017	Elite round	3	1	1	1	2	2
(Finland) 2018	Group stage	3	0	0	3	2	9
(Armenia) 2019	Elite round	3	0	1	2	3	8
(Northern Ireland) ~~2020~~	Canceled due to COVID-19 pandemic						
(Romania) ~~2021~~	Canceled due to COVID-19 pandemic						
(Slovakia) 2022	Elite round	3	1	0	2	4	6
(Malta) 2023	Elite round	3	0	2	1	3	5
(Northern Ireland) 2024	Group stage	3	0	2	1	5	6
(Romania) 2025	Elite round	3	0	2	1	3	5
(Wales) 2026	Elite round	3	2	1	0	5	3
(Czech Republic) 2027	To be decided						
(Bulgaria) 2028	To be decided						
(Netherlands) 2029	To be decided						

*The tournament originally began in 1948 and has had a number of different names. The tournament was renamed as the UEFA European U-19 Championship in 2002, but importantly the overall statistics are collated from 1948.
**Draws include knockout matches decided by penalty shoot-out.
***Silver background colour indicates that Turkey finished as runner-up.
Q - Denotes qualified for the FIFA U-20 World Cup held the following year.

== Individual awards ==
In addition to team victories, Turkish players have won individual awards at UEFA European Under-19 Football Championship.

Year	Top Goalscorer
(Turkey) 2004*	Ali Öztürk
(Turkey) 2006*	İlhan Parlak

*Award was shared with other players.

== Recent results ==
=== 2026 UEFA European Under-19 Championship ===
==== Qualification ====
25 March 2026	Slovakia	0–1	Turkey	Real Cosenza, Cosenza
12:00		Report	Berkay Aslan 39'	Referee: Danilo Nikolić (Serbia)

28 March 2026	Turkey	3–2	Hungary	Real Cosenza, Cosenza
12:00	Berat Luş 4', 33'; Eyyüb Arda Yaşar 41'	Report	Kevin Mondovics 51'; Bendegúz Kovács 90+3'	Referee: Bastien Dechepy (France)

31 March 2026	Turkey	1–1	Italy	Stadio Nicola Ceravolo, Catanzaro
15:00	Darvin Soylu 62'	Report	Samuele Inacio 33'	Referee: Danilo Nikolić (Serbia)

== Players ==
=== Current squad ===
Players born on or after 1 January 2008 are eligible.

The following players were called up for the 2027 UEFA European Under-19 Championship qualification matches against Slovakia on 11 November, Estonia on 14 November and Liechtenstein on 17 November 2026.

Caps and goals correct as of 4 October 2026, after the match against Croatia.

No.	Pos.	Player	Date of birth (age)	Caps	Goals	Club
	GK	Deniz Dönmezer	21 September 2008 (age 18)	4	0	(Turkish Football Federation) Kayserispor
	GK	Efe Yiğit Üstün	7 May 2008 (age 18)	3	0	(Turkish Football Federation) Samsunspor
	GK	Emir Dadük	13 February 2008 (age 18)	0	0	(Turkish Football Federation) Pendikspor
	DF	Vatan Özcan	8 January 2008 (age 18)	7	0	(The Football Association) Norwich City
	DF	Dağhan Kahraman	26 March 2008 (age 18)	5	2	(Turkish Football Federation) Galatasaray
	DF	Boran Eligüzel	8 January 2008 (age 18)	3	1	(Turkish Football Federation) Göztepe
	DF	Şerafettin Çifçier	8 January 2008 (age 18)	3	0	(Turkish Football Federation) Göztepe
	DF	Ada İbik	3 November 2008 (age 18)	2	0	(Turkish Football Federation) Manisa
	DF	Hamza Aydar	20 September 2008 (age 18)	0	0	(Turkish Football Federation) Gençlerbirliği
	MF	Eyyüb Yaşar	21 January 2008 (age 18)	6	1	(German Football Association) Arminia Bielefeld
	MF	Hasan Ayyıldız	10 January 2008 (age 18)	6	0	(Royal Dutch Football Association) Ajax
	MF	Mehmet Efe Türkoğlu	13 March 2008 (age 18)	0	0	(Turkish Football Federation) Kasımpaşa
	MF	Utku Kurtal	20 November 2008 (age 17)	0	0	(Royal Belgian Football Association) Club NXT
	MF	Yakub İlçin	24 March 2009 (age 17)	0	0	(Turkish Football Federation) Antalyaspor
	MF	Yağiz Şen	11 March 2009 (age 17)	0	0	(Turkish Football Federation) Sarıyer
	FW	Thierry Karadeniz	22 June 2008 (age 18)	6	2	(Turkish Football Federation) Sebat
	FW	Pusat Ay	2 January 2008 (age 18)	3	0	(German Football Association) Eintracht Frankfurt
	FW	Erk Aslan	7 November 2008 (age 17)	0	0	(Turkish Football Federation) Gençlerbirliği
	FW	Emin Torunoğulları	19 January 2008 (age 18)	0	0	(German Football Association) Holstein Kiel
	FW	Mustafa Coşkun Tosun	6 January 2009 (age 17)	0	0	(Turkish Football Federation) Çaykur Rizespor
	FW	Yunus Ünal	12 May 2008 (age 18)	0	0	(German Football Association) Hannover 96

=== Recent call-ups ===
The following players have also been called up to the Turkey under-19 squad and remain eligible:

== See also ==
- Turkey men's national football team
- Turkey men's national under-21 football team
- Turkey men's national under-20 football team
- Turkey men's national under-17 football team
- Turkey women's national football team
- Turkey women's national under-21 football team
- Turkey women's national under-19 football team
- Turkey women's national under-17 football team
