= İlkem Özkaynak =

Turkish footballer

Personal information
- Date of birth: 1 May 1982 (age 44)
- Place of birth: Kırklareli, Turkey
- Height: 1.82 m (6 ft 0 in)
- Position: Left full back

Senior career*
Years	Team	Apps	(Gls)
2000–2005	Dardanel Spor	128	(8)
2005–2007	Kayseri Erciyesspor	35	(1)
2007–2009	Ankaragücü	60	(0)
2010–2011	Antalyaspor	12	(0)
2011–2012	Kırklarelispor	9	(0)
2012–2014	Adanaspor	39	(1)
2014–2016	Kırklarelispor	27	(1)
2016–2017	Edirnespor		

International career
2000	Turkey U18	2	(0)
- * Club domestic league appearances and goals

İlkem Özkaynak (born 1 May 1982) is a Turkish former professional footballer who played as a left fullback.
