= İlker Erbay =

Turkish footballer

Personal information
- Date of birth: 14 June 1984 (age 42)
- Place of birth: Istanbul, Turkey
- Height: 1.84 m (6 ft 0 in)
- Position: Left winger

Youth career
- Galatasaray PAF

Senior career*
Years	Team	Apps	(Gls)
2002–2003	Galatasaray	1	(0)
2003	→ Elazığspor (loan)	1	(0)
2004	Beylerbeyi		
2004–2005	Mersin İdman Yurdu		
2005–2006	Gaziantep BB	6	(1)
2006–2007	Galatasaray	0	(0)
2006–2007	→ Kocaelispor (loan)		
2007–2008	Kayseri Erciyesspor	2	(0)
2008–2009	Orduspor	6	(0)
2009	Kayseri Erciyesspor	3	(0)
2009–2010	Tepecikspor		
2010	Fethiyespor		
2010–2011	Alanyaspor	21	(2)
2012	Beypazarı Şeker	5	(1)
2012–2015	Tepecikspor	57	(0)
2015	Payasspor	13	(0)
2016	Bayrampaşa	7	(0)
2016–2017	Feriköy		
2017–2018	Büyükçekmece		
2018–2019	Avcılar Belediye Gençlik		
- * Club domestic league appearances and goals

İlker Erbay (born 14 June 1984) is a Turkish former footballer.
