= Hanefi Mahçiçek =

Turkish politician and football chairman

Hanefi Mahçiçek was a Turkish politician and football chairman. He was born in Kahramanmaraş. He was the chairman of Kahramanmaraşspor.
