= Eser Yağmur =

Turkish professional footballer (born 1983)

Personal information
- Full name: Eser Yağmur
- Date of birth: May 29, 1983 (age 43)
- Place of birth: Berlin, Germany
- Height: 1.89 m (6 ft 2 in)
- Position: Striker

Senior career*
Years	Team	Apps	(Gls)
2002–2006	Beşiktaş	3	(1)
2003–2004	→ Elazığspor (loan)	25	(4)
2004–2005	→ Diyarbakırspor (loan)	27	(3)
2005–2006	→ Bursaspor (loan)	14	(6)
2006–2008	Bursaspor	27	(2)
2008–2009	Karşıyaka	26	(3)
2009–2011	Konyaspor	35	(6)
2011	Kayseri Erciyesspor	5	(0)
2011–2012	Denizlispor	17	(6)
2012–2013	Tavşanlı Linyitspor	6	(1)
2013	Kartalspor	9	(1)
- * Club domestic league appearances and goals as of 1 October 2015

Eser Yağmur (born 29 May 1983) is a Turkish professional footballer who last played as a striker for Kartalspor. He has played for the Süper Lig sides Beşiktaş, Bursaspor, Konyaspor and Denizlispor.

He has also been capped by the Turkey U-20 and U-21 squads.
