= Ertuğrul Arslan =

Turkish footballer

Personal information
- Date of birth: January 26, 1980 (age 46)
- Place of birth: Sivas, Turkey
- Height: 1.67 m (5 ft 5 1/2 in)
- Position: Midfielder

Senior career*
Years	Team	Apps	(Gls)
1998–2001	Kayserispor	62	(11)
2001–2002	Kayseri Erciyesspor	23	(0)
2002–2007	Sivasspor	85	(5)
2006	→ Bursaspor (loan)	12	(0)
2007	→ Elazığspor (loan)	15	(3)
2007–2011	Antalyaspor	98	(2)
2011–2012	Konyaspor	22	(0)
2012–2014	Balıkesirspor	57	(1)
2014–2016	Göztepe	35	(0)
2016	Kocaeli Birlik Spor	12	(0)
2016–2017	Menemen Belediyespor	27	(1)
2017–2018	Fethiyespor	15	(0)
2018	Kemerspor 2003	10	(0)
2018–2019	Konyaaltı Belediyespor	9	(1)

Managerial career
- 2020: Antalya Kemerspor
- 2021–2024: Antalyaspor (assistant)
- 2024–2025: Borussia Dortmund (assistant)
- 2025–2026: Boluspor
- * Club domestic league appearances and goals

Ertuğrul Arslan (born 26 January 1980) is a Turkish football coach and retired player.

== Career ==
On 22 July 2012, Balıkesirspor signed Arslan on a two-year contract.
