= Mardinspor =

Turkish football club

- Full name: Mardinspor Kulübü
- Founded: 1969
- Dissolved: 2015
- Ground: 21 Kasım Stadium, Mardin
- Capacity: 5,700
- League: Turkish Regional Amateur League

Mardinspor was a Turkish football club located in Mardin, Turkey. They played their home games in Mardin 21 Kasım Stadium in Mardin. The club was founded in 1969 after the merger of Timurspor, Kalespor, Mezopotamyaspor and Gençlikspor. The club colors were red-navy. Financial mismanagement led ultimately in 2015 to the dissolvation of the Southeastern Anatolia Region club.

== League participations ==
- TFF First League: 1980–86, 1988–89, 2004–08
- TFF Second League: 2001–04, 2008–12
- TFF Third League: 1969–73, 1986–88, 1989–94, 1995–01, 2012–13
- Turkish Regional Amateur League: 2013–15
- Amateur League: 1973–80, 1994–95

== Honours ==
- TFF Second League
  - Winners (1): 2004
- TFF Third League
  - Winners (2): 1988, 2001

== Notable players ==
- (Turkey) Eyüp Arın
- (Turkey) Ali Akdeniz
- (Turkey) Şadi Çolak
- (Turkey) Şehmus Özer
- (Turkey) Zülküf Özer
- (Turkey) Ali Öztürk
- (Turkey) Orhan Şam
- (Turkey) İsmet Taşdemir
