= 2009–10 Galatasaray S.K. season =

Galatasaray
2009–10 season
- President: Adnan Polat
- Head coach: Frank Rijkaard
- Stadium: Ali Sami Yen Stadı
- Süper Lig: 3rd
- Turkish Cup: Quarter-finals
- UEFA Europa League: Round of 32
- Top goalscorer: League: Milan Baroš (11); All: Milan Baroš; Shabani Nonda (16 each)
- Average home league attendance: 24,437
Home colours	Away colours	Third colours

The 2009–10 season was Galatasaray's 106th in existence and the 52nd consecutive season in the Süper Lig. This article shows statistics of the club's players in the season, and also lists all matches that the club have played in the season.

== Club ==
=== The Board of Directors ===
Position	Staff
President	(Turkey) Adnan Polat
Deputy President	(Turkey) Mehmet Helvacı
Vice-President & Finance	(Turkey) Ali Haşhaş
Vice-President & Football Committee	(Turkey) Haldun Üstünel
Public Relations	(Turkey) Sinan Kılıç
General Secretary	(Turkey) Mümtaz Tahincioğlu
Marketing & Riding	(Turkey) Cemal Özgörkey
Communications	(Turkey) Faruk Bil
Accounting	(Turkey) Işın Çelebi
Real Estate	(Turkey) Adil Emecan
Water Sports	(Turkey) Nejat Uygur
Football Management Trade Manager	(Turkey) Adnan Sezgin
Football Committee	(Turkey) Murat Yalçındağ
Football Committee	(Turkey) Tunca Hazinedaroğlu
Football Infrastructure	(Turkey) Metin Karakaya

Last updated: 21 December
Source: Galatasaray SK

=== Technical Staff ===
Position	Staff
Head Coach	(Netherlands) Frank Rijkaard
Assistant Coach	(Netherlands) Johan Neeskens
Fitness Coach	(Spain) Albert Roca Puyol (Spain) Carlos Cuadrat Xiqués
Goalkeeping Coach	(Turkey) Nezih Ali Boloğlu

Last updated: 11 August
Source: Galatasaray SK

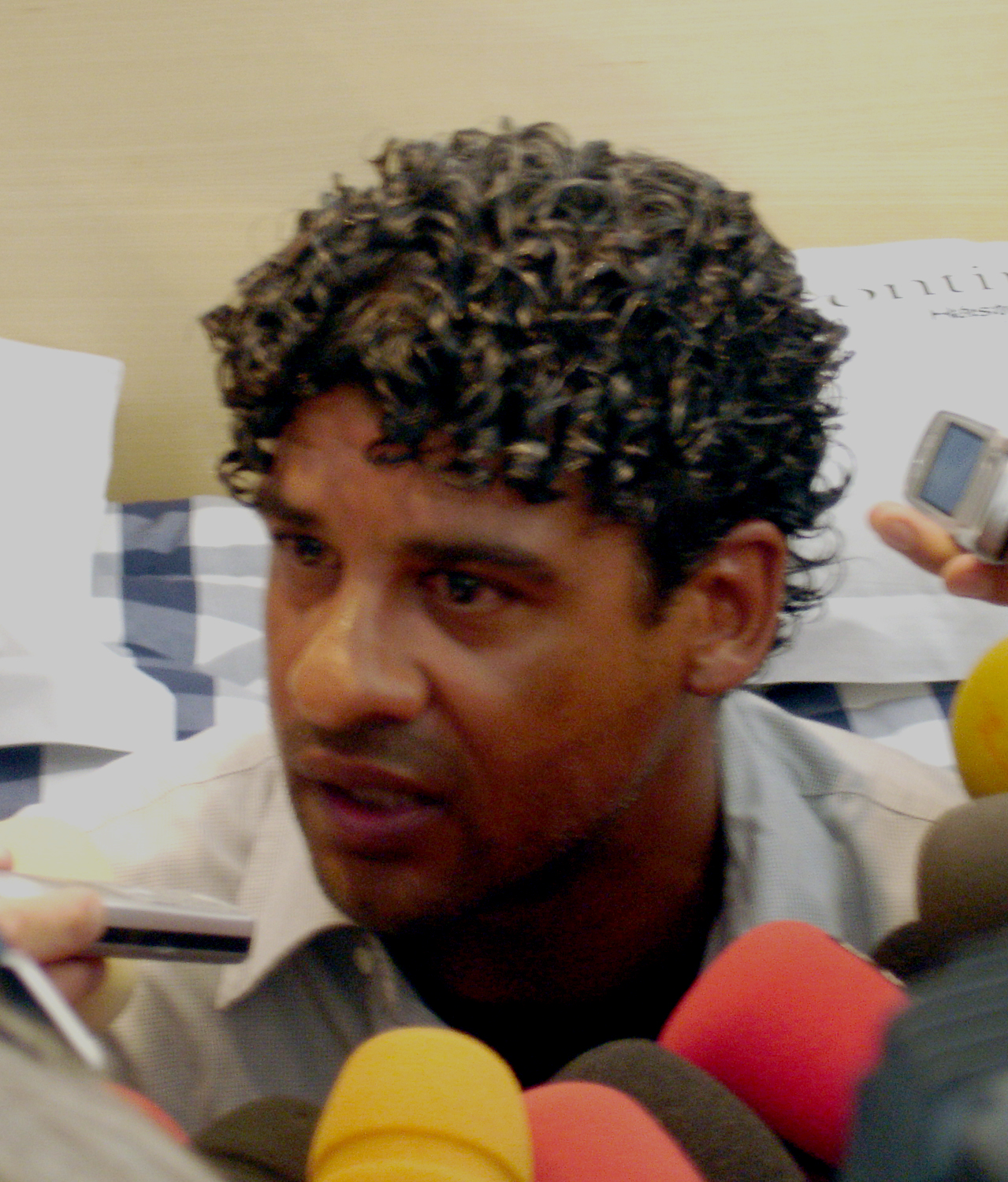
Frank Rijkaard

=== Medical Staff ===
Position	Staff
Doctor	(Turkey) Murat Çevik
Physiotherapist	(Turkey) Burak Koca (Turkey) Cumhur Erol
Masseur	(Turkey) Erkan Kazancı (Turkey) Sedat Peker (Turkey) Serdal Yıldız

Last updated: 25 December
Source: Galatasaray SK

== Transfers ==
=== In ===
Date	Pos.	Name	From	Fee
9 June 2009	MF	(Turkey) Mustafa Sarp	(Turkey) Bursaspor	Free
22 June 2009	DF	(Turkey) Gökhan Zan	(Turkey) Beşiktaş	Free
1 July 2009	GK	(Argentina) Leo Franco	(Spain) Atlético Madrid	Free
2 July 2009	FW	(Ivory Coast) Abdul Kader Keïta	(France) Lyon	£8.5m
30 July 2009	MF	(Brazil) Elano	(England) Manchester City	£8.0m
31 August 2009	MF	(Turkey) Caner Erkin	(Russia) CSKA Moscow	Loan
1 September 2009	GK	(Turkey) Ufuk Ceylan	(Turkey) Manisaspor	£1.0M + 3 players
14 January 2010	DF	(Australia) Lucas Neill	(England) Everton	£750.000
21 January 2010	FW	(Brazil) Jô	(England) Manchester City	Loan (£560.000)
27 January 2010	MF	(Mexico) Giovani dos Santos	(England) Tottenham Hotspur	Loan
1 June 2010	MF	(Turkey) Musa Çağıran	(Turkey) Altay	TBA
1 June 2010	DF	(Turkey) Ali Turan	(Turkey) Kayserispor	Free

=== Out ===
Date	Pos.	Name	To	Fee
31 May 2009	GK	(Italy) Morgan De Sanctis	(Spain) Sevilla	Loan return
31 May 2009	MF	(Turkey) Hasan Şaş	Retired	Free
19 June 2009	MF	(Turkey) Gökhan Öztürk	(Turkey) Gaziantepspor	Free
22 June 2009	MF	(Turkey) Ferdi Elmas	(Turkey) Karabükspor	Released
23 June 2009	DF	(Turkey) Erkan Ferin	(Turkey) Trabzon Karadenizspor	Released
24 June 2009	DF	(Turkey) Anıl Karaer	(Turkey) Adanaspor	Undisclosed
24 June 2009	FW	(Turkey) Ümit Karan	(Turkey) Eskişehirspor	Released
25 June 2009	MF	(Turkey) Zafer Şakar	(Turkey) Boluspor	Released
26 June 2009	FW	(Turkey) Mehmet Düz	(Turkey) Mersin İdmanyurdu	Released
10 July 2009	DF	(Turkey) Muhammed Ali Atam	(Turkey) Sarıyer	Released
16 July 2009	MF	(Turkey) Volkan Bekçi	(Turkey) Siirtspor	Released
16 July 2009	FW	(Turkey) Uğur Erdoğan	(Turkey) Siirtspor	Released
20 July 2009	MF	(Turkey) İrfan Başaran	(Turkey) Orduspor	Released
25 July 2009	MF	(Turkey) Cafercan Aksu	(Turkey) Konya Şekerspor	Released
31 July 2009	DF	(Turkey) Gür Ege Gürel	(Turkey) Tepecikspor	Released
31 July 2009	DF	(Turkey) Semih Erdem	(Turkey) Kartal Belediyespor	Released
31 July 2009	FW	(Turkey) Efecan Karaca	(Turkey) Kartalspor	Released
25 August 2009	MF	(Turkey) Mülayim Erdem	(Turkey) Yalovaspor	Released
27 August 2009	DF	(Turkey) Serdar Keşçi	(Turkey) Orhangazispor	Released
27 August 2009	DF	(Turkey) Volkan Yaman	(Turkey) Eskişehirspor	€1.2M
1 September 2009	MF	(Turkey) Mehmet Güven	(Turkey) Manisaspor	Exchanged
1 September 2009	GK	(Turkey) Orkun Uşak	(Turkey) Manisaspor	Exchanged
1 September 2009	FW	(Turkey) Yaser Yıldız	(Turkey) Manisaspor	Exchanged
1 September 2009	FW	(Turkey) Necati Ateş	(Turkey) Antalyaspor	Released
30 December 2009	DF	(Turkey) Alparslan Erdem	(Turkey) Gençlerbirliği	€500,000
14 January 2010	FW	(Turkey) Serkan Çalık	(Turkey) Gençlerbirliği	Undisclosed
22 January 2010	MF	(Sweden) Tobias Linderoth	Retired	Released
28 January 2010	FW	(Democratic Republic of the Congo) Shabani Nonda	TBA	Released
7 February 2010	MF	(Brazil) Lincoln	(Brazil) Palmeiras	€2.66M
13 May 2010	MF	(Turkey) Mehmet Topal	(Spain) Valencia	€5M

=== Loan out ===
Date From	Date To	Pos.	Name	Moving To
22 August 2009	31 May 2010	MF	(Argentina) Marcelo Carrusca	(Argentina) Estudiantes
	31 May 2010	DF	(Turkey) Uğur Demirok	(Turkey) Kartalspor
	31 May 2010	DF	(Turkey) Oğuz Sabankay	(Turkey) İstanbul B.B.
24 July 2009	31 May 2010	DF	(Turkey) İlker Cihan	(Turkey) Tepecikspor
24 July 2009	31 May 2010	MF	(Turkey) Recep Soner Cihan	(Turkey) Tepecikspor
3 August 2009	31 May 2010	FW	(Turkey) Erhan Şentürk	(Turkey) Diyarbakırspor
24 August 2009	31 May 2010	FW	(Turkey) Özgürcan Özcan	(Turkey) Çaykur Rizespor
27 August 2009	31 May 2010	GK	(Turkey) Fırat Kocaoğlu	(Turkey) Kasımpaşa
28 August 2009	31 May 2010	FW	(Turkey) Fatih Sercan Ekinci	(Turkey) Tepecikspor
1 September 2009	31 May 2010	GK	(Turkey) Ersel Çetinkaya	(Turkey) Orhangazispor
19 January 2010	31 May 2010	MF	(Turkey) Serdar Eylik	(Turkey) Orduspor
29 January 2010	31 May 2010	DF	(Turkey) Semih Kaya	(Turkey) Gaziantepspor
1 February 2010	31 May 2010	MF	(Turkey) Aydın Yılmaz	(Turkey) Eskişehirspor

== Squad statistics ==
No.	Pos.	Name	TSL		ZTC		UEL		Total		Discipline	
No.	Pos.	Name	Apps	Goals	Apps	Goals	Apps	Goals	Apps	Goals	Yellow card	Red card
1	GK	(Turkey) Aykut Erçetin	7	0	4	0	1	0	12	0	0	0
2	DF	(Turkey) Emre Güngör	10	0	5	0	4	0	19	0	5	0
3	DF	(Turkey) Uğur Uçar	14	0	6	0	6	0	26	0	3	1
5	DF	(Turkey) Gökhan Zan	9	0	1	0	6	0	16	0	3	0
6	MF	(Sweden) Tobias Linderoth	4	0	3	0	3	0	10	0	0	0
7	MF	(Turkey) Aydın Yılmaz	11	0	2	0	7	0	20	0	2	0
8	MF	(Turkey) Barış Özbek	19	1	6	2	10	2	35	5	4	2
9	MF	(Brazil) Elano	25	3	5	1	9	3	38	7	3	1
10	MF	(Turkey) Arda Turan	29	7	6	4	12	0	47	11	8	0
11	MF	(Ivory Coast) Abdul Kader Keïta	27	5	1	0	11	5	39	10	5	1
12	DF	(Australia) Lucas Neill	14	1	2	0	2	0	18	1	3	1
14	MF	(Turkey) Mehmet Topal	24	0	4	0	9	1	37	1	5	0
15	FW	(Czech Republic) Milan Baroš	17	11	1	0	6	5	24	16	5	0
16	MF	(Turkey) Mustafa Sarp	30	3	6	0	13	2	49	4	8	0
17	FW	(Turkey) Yaser Yıldız	0	0	0	0	2	0	2	0	0	0
18	MF	(Turkey) Ayhan Akman	19	0	6	0	11	0	35	0	6	0
19	MF	(Australia) Harry Kewell	17	9	2	1	9	4	28	14	6	0
20	FW	(Democratic Republic of the Congo) Shabani Nonda	13	7	4	2	8	7	25	16	1	0
21	DF	(Turkey) Emre Aşık	6	0	2	0	5	0	13	0	3	0
22	DF	(Turkey) Hakan Balta	25	1	3	0	11	1	39	2	3	0
23	DF	(Turkey) Serkan Kurtuluş	0	0	1	0	1	0	2	0	0	0
25	GK	(Argentina) Leo Franco	26	0	0	0	11	0	37	0	3	0
28	DF	(Turkey) Semih Kaya	0	0	0	0	0	0	0	0	0	0
30	MF	(Mexico) Giovani dos Santos	14	0	2	0	2	0	18	0	2	0
32	FW	(Brazil) Jô	13	3	2	0	0	0	15	3	2	0
33	FW	(Turkey) Berkin Kamil Arslan	0	0	1	0	0	0	1	0	0	0
34	FW	(Turkey) Erhan Şentürk	0	0	0	0	1	0	1	0	0	0
37	MF	(Turkey) Emre Çolak	8	1	3	3	0	0	11	4	1	0
39	MF	(Turkey) Serdar Eylik	1	0	0	0	4	0	5	0	0	0
54	GK	(Turkey) Orkun Uşak	0	0	0	0	2	0	2	0	0	0
55	MF	(Turkey) Sabri Sarıoğlu	24	1	1	0	10	1	35	2	6	0
60	DF	(Turkey) Alparslan Erdem	0	0	1	0	3	0	4	0	0	1
69	MF	(Turkey) Cumhur Yılmaztürk	1	0	0	0	0	0	1	0	0	0
74	DF	(Turkey) Volkan Yaman	1	0	0	0	0	0	1	0	0	0
76	DF	(Turkey) Servet Çetin	24	1	6	0	11	1	41	2	1	0
80	DF	(Turkey) Murat Akça	0	0	0	0	0	0	0	0	0	0
86	GK	(Turkey) Ufuk Ceylan	0	0	3	0	0	0	3	0	0	0
88	MF	(Turkey) Caner Erkin	20	0	6	3	4	0	30	3	11	1
90	DF	(Turkey) Çetin Güngör	0	0	2	0	1	0	3	0	0	0
99	DF	(Turkey) Berk Neziroğulları	1	0	0	0	0	0	1	0	0	0

Statistics accurate as of match played May 16, 2010

== Pre-season and friendlies ==
All times at CET

1 July 2009 Friendly	Galatasaray (Turkey)	2–2	(Germany) FC Kleve	Kleve, Germany
19:00	Şentürk 5'; Yılmaz 18'	(Report)	30'; Mahr 37' (pen.)	Stadium: Volksbank Arena

5 July 2009 Zayton-Cup '09	Galatasaray (Turkey)	1–0	(Egypt) Al-Ahly	Wattenscheid, Germany
17:00	Özbek 34' (pen.)	(Report)		Stadium: Lohrheide-Stadion

8 July 2009 Zayton-Cup '09	Galatasaray (Turkey)	1–0	(Morocco) Wydad Casablanca	Wattenscheid, Germany
20:00	Çolak 42'	(Report)		Stadium: Lohrheide-Stadion

11 July 2009 Zayton-Cup '09	Galatasaray (Turkey)	0–1	(Germany) Bayer Leverkusen	Wattenscheid, Germany
20:00		(Report)	Friedrich 37'	Stadium: Lohrheide-Stadion

== Competitions ==
=== Süper Lig ===
==== League table ====
Pos	Team	Pld	W	D	L	GF	GA	GD	Pts	Qualification or relegation
1	Bursaspor (C)	34	23	6	5	65	26	+39	75	Qualification to Champions League group stage
2	Fenerbahçe	34	23	5	6	61	28	+33	74	Qualification to Champions League third qualifying round
3	Galatasaray	34	19	7	8	61	35	+26	64 (Note: Galatasaray finished ahead of Beşiktaş on head-to-head record: Galatasaray–Beşiktaş 3–0, Beşiktaş–Galatasaray 1–1.)	Qualification to Europa League third qualifying round
4	Beşiktaş	34	18	10	6	47	25	+22	64	Qualification to Europa League second qualifying round
5	Trabzonspor	34	16	9	9	53	32	+21	57	Qualification to Europa League play-off round (Note: Trabzonspor won the 2009–10 Turkish Cup and thus qualified for the play-off round of the UEFA Europa League.)

Source: Süper Lig official website
Rules for classification: 1st overall points, 2nd head-to-head points, 3rd head-to-head goal differential, 4th overall goal differential, 5th overall goals scored.
(C) Champions

==== Results summary ====
Overall								Home						Away					
Pld	W	D	L	GF	GA	GD	Pts	W	D	L	GF	GA	GD	W	D	L	GF	GA	GD
34	19	7	8	61	35	+26	64	11	4	2	37	13	+24	8	3	6	24	22	+2

Source: Turkcell Super League

==== Results by round ====
Round	1	2	3	4	5	6	7	8	9	10	11	12	13	14	15	16	17	18	19	20	21	22	23	24	25	26	27	28	29	30	31	32	33	34
Ground	A	H	H	A	H	A	H	A	H	A	H	A	H	A	H	A	H	H	A	A	H	A	H	A	H	A	H	A	H	A	H	A	H	A
Result	W	W	W	W	W	W	D	L	W	L	W	W	D	L	D	W	W	W	W	D	W	D	W	L	W	L	L	D	W	W	D	W	L	L
Position	3	2	1	1	1	1	2	2	2	3	2	2	2	4	4	3	2	2	2	2	1	1	1	2	2	2	4	4	3	3	3	3	3	3

Source: Galatasaray SK
A = Away; H = Home; W = Win; D = Draw; L = Loss

==== Matches ====
All times in EEST

9 August 2009 1	Gaziantepspor	2–3	Galatasaray	Gaziantep
19:30	Souza 37'; Tabata 90' (pen.)	(Report)	Turan 7' (yellow card) 88'; Sarp 21'; Nonda 84'	Stadium: Gaziantep Kamil Ocak Stadium; Referee: Bünyamin Gezer

15 August 2009 2	Galatasaray	4–1	Denizlispor	Istanbul
21:45	Baroš (yellow card) 39'; Kewell 44' (pen.), 67' (pen.); Özbek (yellow card) 48'; Turan 59'; Akyıldız 74' (o.g.); Keïta (yellow card) 85'	(Report)	Angelov 39'; Chrysostome (yellow card) 48'; Akyıldız (yellow card) 80'; Solakel (yellow card) 89'	Stadium: Ali Sami Yen Stadium; Referee: Deniz Çoban

23 August 2009 3	Galatasaray	4–1	Kayserispor	Istanbul
21:00	Baroš 14', 89'; Makukula 35' (o.g.); Elano 65'; Sarıoğlu (yellow card) 83'	(Report)	Saidou (yellow card) 8'; Hamidou (yellow card) 14'; Makukula 31'; Cángele (yellow card) 60'; Aziz (yellow card) 76'	Stadium: Ali Sami Yen Stadium; Referee: Halis Özkahya

31 August 2009 4	Ankaraspor	0–2	Galatasaray	Ankara
21:00	Brabec (yellow card) 38'	(Report)	Kewell 74'; Nonda 82'	Stadium: Yenikent Asaş Stadium; Referee: Kuddusi Müftüoğlu

12 September 2009 5	Galatasaray	3–0	Beşiktaş	Istanbul
21:00	Sarp 4' (yellow card) 38'; Baroš 64', 82' (yellow card) 84'; Aşık (yellow card) 89'	(Report)	Ferrari (yellow card) 37'; Tabata (yellow card) 37'; Özkan (yellow card) 68'; Sivok (yellow card) 84'	Stadium: Ali Sami Yen Stadium; Referee: Bülent Yıldırım

21 September 2009 6	Kasımpaşa	1–3	Galatasaray	Istanbul
21:00	Moritz 26'; Erdoğan (yellow card) 56'; Güneş (yellow card) 58'; Elmacı (yellow card) 61'; Kaplan (yellow card) 72'	(Report)	Sarp (yellow card) 47'; Nonda 62', 88', 89'; Keïta (yellow card) 72'	Stadium: Recep Tayyip Erdoğan Stadium; Referee: İlker Meral

27 September 2009 7	Galatasaray	1–1	Eskişehirspor	Istanbul
20:00	Topal (yellow card) 35'; Nonda 38'; Sarıoğlu (yellow card) 77'	(Report)	Yılmaz 55'; Karan (yellow card) 76'; Kocabey (yellow card) 79'	Stadium: Ali Sami Yen Stadium; Referee: Cüneyt Çakır

4 October 2009 8	Ankaragücü	3–0	Galatasaray	Ankara
16:00	Bahtiyaroğlu (yellow card) 66'; Duruer 83'; Aygün 89'; Güçer 90'	(Report)	Sarp (yellow card) 60'	Stadium: Ankara 19 Mayıs Stadium; Referee: Koray Gençerler

18 October 2009 9	Galatasaray	4–3	Trabzonspor	Istanbul
20:00	Kewell 23'; Çetin 37'; Turan 68' (yellow card) 77'; Baroš 71' (yellow card) 87'; Özbek (yellow card) 73'; Keïta (yellow card) 89'	(Report)	Čale (yellow card) 13'; Cora 43' (yellow card) 44'; Colman 54' 85'; Kaçar (yellow card) 64'; Baytar (yellow card) 67'	Stadium: Ali Sami Yen Stadium; Referee: Mustafa Kamil Abitoğlu

25 October 2009 10	Fenerbahçe	3–1	Galatasaray	Istanbul
20:00	Alex 13', 55' (pen.); Carlos (yellow card) 75'; Güiza 89'	(Report)	Franco (yellow card) 54'; Balta 58'; Nonda (yellow card) 61'; Keïta (red card) 75'; Akman (yellow card) 86'	Stadium: Şükrü Saracoğlu Stadium; Referee: Bünyamin Gezer

1 November 2009 11	Galatasaray	2–0	Sivasspor	Istanbul
16:00	Nonda 11'; Kewell 45'; Balta (yellow card) 62'; Sarp (yellow card) 73'; Özbek (yellow card) 75'; Sarıoğlu (yellow card) 89'	(Report)	Dağaşan (yellow card) 43'; Bayrak (yellow card) 46'; Aydın (yellow card) 46'; Çakmak (yellow card) 68'; Bıkmaz (yellow card) 80'	Stadium: Ali Sami Yen Stadium; Referee: Bülent Yıldırım

8 November 2009 12	Diyarbakırspor	1–2	Galatasaray	Diyarbakır
20:00	Mendoza 10'; Aşkaroğlu (yellow card) 14'; Doğantez (yellow card) 34'; Aragón (yellow card) 49'; Yavuz (yellow card) 89'	(Report)	Sarıoğlu 42'; Turan 52'; Özbek (yellow card) 29' (yellow-red card) 63'	Stadium: Diyarbakır Atatürk Stadium; Referee: Tolga Özkalfa

22 November 2009 13	Galatasaray	1–1	Manisaspor	Istanbul
20:00	Kewell 38'; Zan (yellow card) 96'	(Report)	Simpson 82'; Aydın (yellow card) 87'	Stadium: Ali Sami Yen Stadium; Referee: Kuddusi Müftüoğlu

27 November 2009 14	Bursaspor	1–0	Galatasaray	Bursa
20:00	Şen 57'; Keçeli (yellow card) 80'; İpek (red card) 89'	(Report)	Kewell (yellow card) 37'; Elano (yellow card) 76'; Turan (yellow card) 88'; Sarıoğlu (yellow card) 89'; Zan (yellow card) 100'	Stadium: Bursa Atatürk Stadium; Referee: Halis Özkahya

6 December 2009 15	Galatasaray	1–1	İstanbul BŞB	Istanbul
20:00	Kewell 56' (yellow card) 88'; Balta (yellow card) 58'; Yılmaz (yellow card) 89'; Sarp (yellow card) 89'	(Report)	Sylla (yellow card) 44'; Ekşioğlu (yellow card) 74'; İnanç (yellow card) 78'; Tekdemir (yellow card) 86'; Durtuluk 89'	Stadium: Ali Sami Yen Stadium; Referee: Hüseyin Göçek

11 December 2009 16	Antalyaspor	2–3	Galatasaray	Antalya
20:00	Ak 7'; Jedinak 21'; Ağçay (yellow card) 44'; Arslan (yellow card) 49'; Ayhan (yellow card) 87'	(Report)	Keïta 30'; Topal (yellow card) 35'; Elano 64'; Kewell 67' (yellow card) 89'	Stadium: Antalya Atatürk Stadium; Referee: Deniz Çoban

19 December 2009 17	Galatasaray	1–0	Gençlerbirliği	Istanbul
20:00	Erkin (yellow card) 55'; Keïta (yellow card) 67'; Kewell 77'	(Report)	Çubukçu (yellow card) 62'; Şeras (yellow card) 82'	Stadium: Ali Sami Yen Stadium; Referee: Kuddusi Müftüoğlu

24 January 2010 18	Galatasaray	1–0	Gaziantepspor	Istanbul
19:00	Sarp 75'	(Report)	Arı (yellow card) 23' (red card) 33'	Stadium: Ali Sami Yen Stadium; Referee: Aytekin Durmaz

31 January 2010 19	Denizlispor	1–2	Galatasaray	Denizli
19:00	Memişler 53' (yellow card) 80'	(Report)	Turan 18'; Çolak (yellow card) 26'; Jô 62'; Franco (yellow card) 82'	Stadium: Atatürk Stadium; Referee: Halis Özkahya

6 February 2010 20	Kayserispor	0–0	Galatasaray	Kayseri
19:00	Aslantaş (yellow card) 12' (yellow-red card) 64'; Toscalı (yellow card) 30'	(Report)	Güngör (yellow card) 30'; Erkin (yellow card) 62'	Stadium: Kadir Has Stadium; Attendance: 33,000; Referee: Tolga Özkalfa

21	Galatasaray	3–0	Ankaraspor	Istanbul
		(Report)		Stadium: Ali Sami Yen Stadium

21 February 2010 22	Beşiktaş	1–1	Galatasaray	Istanbul
19:00	Tello (yellow card) 30'; Sivok 81'	(Report)	Özbek (yellow card) 29'; Turan 67'	Stadium: BJK İnönü Stadium; Referee: Fırat Aydınus

28 February 2010 23	Galatasaray	4–1	Kasımpaşa	Istanbul
19:00	Turan 29'; Keïta 74', 83'; Jô 81'	(Report)	Başdaş (yellow card) 3'; Kurtuluş 67'; Avcı (red card) 79'	Stadium: Ali Sami Yen Stadium; Referee: Mustafa Kamil Abitoğlu

8 March 2010 24	Eskişehirspor	2–1	Galatasaray	Eskişehir
20:00	Arslan 43', 46'; Karan (yellow card) 56'; Kaya (yellow card) 61'; Kocabey (yellow card) 71'; Coşkun (yellow card) 88'; Sarı (yellow card) 90'	(Report)	Akman (yellow card) 35'; Turan (yellow card) 58'; Jô (yellow card) 61'; Erkin (yellow card) 63'; Elano 72'	Stadium: Eskişehir Atatürk Stadium; Referee: Bülent Yıldırım

14 March 2010 25	Galatasaray	3–0	Ankaragücü	Istanbul
19:00	Jô 4'; Keïta 36'; Baroš 90+3'	(Report)	Güçer (yellow card) 66'	Stadium: Ali Sami Yen Stadium; Referee: Kuddusi Müftüoğlu

21 March 2010 26	Trabzonspor	1–0	Galatasaray	Trabzon
19:00	Colman 28'; Kaçar (yellow card) 73'	(Report)		Stadium: Hüseyin Avni Aker Stadium; Referee: Yunus Yıldırım

28 March 2010 27	Galatasaray	0–1	Fenerbahçe	Istanbul
19:00	Erkin (yellow card) 14'; Topal (yellow card) 65'; Baroš (yellow card) 80'	(Report)	Kaçar (yellow card) 38'; Selçuk Şahin 70'; Demirel (yellow card) 80'	Stadium: Ali Sami Yen Stadium; Referee: Cüneyt Çakır

5 April 2010 28	Sivasspor	1–1	Galatasaray	Sivas
20:00	Bayrak (yellow card) 19'; Sözgelmez (yellow card) 29'; Keïta (yellow card) 72'; Çakmak (yellow card) 90'; Yıldız 90'	(Report)	Özbek 16' (red card) 90+1'; Neill (yellow card) 64'	Stadium: Sivas 4 Eylül Stadium; Referee: Halis Özkahya

11 April 2010 29	Galatasaray	4–1	Diyarbakırspor	Istanbul
19:00	Baroš 17', 27', 51'; Erkin (yellow card) 31'; Elano (yellow card) 44'; Neill 50'	(Report)	Bebbe 50'	Stadium: Ali Sami Yen Stadium; Referee: Kuddusi Müftüoğlu

17 April 2010 30	Manisaspor	1–2	Galatasaray	Manisa
19:00	Topal 74' (o.g.)	(Report)	Keïta 21'; Baroš (yellow card) 41' (goal) 64'; Dos Santos (yellow card) 82'	Stadium: Manisa 19 Mayıs Stadium; Referee: Abdullah Yılmaz

25 April 2010 31	Galatasaray	0–0	Bursaspor	Istanbul
19:00	Turan (yellow card) 60'; Neill (yellow card) 61' (yellow-red card) 72'; Keïta (yellow card) 73'; Erkin (yellow card) 90'	(Report)	Zápotočný (yellow card) 45' (yellow-red card) 73'; Erdoğan (yellow card) 61'	Stadium: Ali Sami Yen Stadium; Referee: Bünyamin Gezer

1 May 2010 32	İstanbul BŞB	0–1	Galatasaray	Istanbul
20:00	Depe (yellow card) 30'; İnanç (yellow card) 33'	(Report)	Güngör (yellow card) 18'; Baroš 23'; Akman (yellow card) 53'; Jô (yellow card) 88'	Stadium: Atatürk Olympic Stadium; Referee: Fırat Aydınus

8 May 2010 33	Galatasaray	1–2	Antalyaspor	Istanbul
20:00	Ayhan 64' (o.g.); Sarıoğlu (yellow card) 74'; Balta (yellow card) 90'; Topal (yellow card) 90'	(Report)	Ayhan (yellow card) 31'; Tita 65'; Cihan 90'	Stadium: Ali Sami Yen Stadium; Referee: Tolga Özkalfa

16 May 2010 34	Gençlerbirliği	2–1	Galatasaray	Ankara
20:00	Meriç 15'; Harbuzi 80'; Şeras (red card) 90'	(Report)	Erkin (yellow card) 54'; Çolak 56'; Uçar (yellow card) 68' (yellow-red card) 86'	Stadium: Ankara 19 Mayıs Stadium; Referee: Halis Özkahya

=== Turkish Cup ===
Kick-off listed in local time (EEST)

==== Play-off round ====
28 October 2009	Galatasaray	2–1	Bucaspor	Istanbul
19:00	Kewell 17' (yellow card) 65'; Turan 32'; Elano (red card) 34'; Erkin (yellow card) 63'	(Report)	Aslanoğlu 85'	Stadium: Ali Sami Yen Stadium; Referee: Abdullah Yılmaz

==== Group stage ====
Pos	Team	Pld	W	D	L	GF	GA	GD	Pts
1	Galatasaray	4	3	1	0	10	2	+8	10
2	Trabzonspor	4	3	0	1	11	3	+8	9
3	Ankaragücü	4	2	1	1	4	3	+1	7
4	Orduspor	4	1	0	3	4	8	−4	3
5	Denizli B.S.K.	4	0	0	4	2	15	−13	0

Source: tff.org (in Turkish)
Rules for classification: 1) points; 2) goal difference; 3) number of goals scored.

23 December 2009 1	Galatasaray	2–1	Trabzonspor	Istanbul
21:30	Erkin (yellow card) 38' (goal) 40'; Turan 47'	(Report)	Song 54'; İnan (yellow card) 65'	Stadium: Ali Sami Yen Stadium; Referee: Fırat Aydınus

10 January 2010 2	Orduspor	0–3	Galatasaray	Ordu
13:30	Yükseker (red card) 4'; Akaminko (yellow card) 86'	(Report)	Turan 10' (yellow card) 71'; Akman (yellow card) 34'; Nonda 52', 61'; Erkin (yellow card) 58'	Stadium: Ordu 19 Eylül Stadium; Referee: Bünyamin Gezer

17 January 2010 3	Galatasaray	5–1	Denizli Belediyespor	Istanbul
20:30	Erkin 9'; Özbek 19', 23'; Çolak 62', 65'	(Report)	Kabadayı 50'; Gökçe (yellow card) 74'; Yılmazlar (yellow card) 77'	Stadium: Ali Sami Yen Stadium; Referee: Hakan Özkan

27 January 2010 4	Ankaragücü	0–0	Galatasaray	Ankara
20:30	Broggi (yellow card) 36'	(Report)	Güngör (yellow card) 26'; Akman (yellow card) 68'	Stadium: Ankara 19 Mayıs Stadium; Referee: Özgür Yankaya

==== Quarter-finals ====
3 February 2010 First leg	Antalyaspor	2–1	Galatasaray	Antalya
20:00	Djiehoua 26'; Ateş 40'; Ağçay (yellow card) 68'	(Report	Turan 10'; Güngör (yellow card) 65'; Dos Santos (yellow card) 87'	Stadium: Antalya Atatürk Stadium; Referee: Bülent Yıldırım

10 February 2010 Second leg	Galatasaray	3–2 (3–3a agg.)	Antalyaspor	Istanbul
20:00	Elano (yellow card) 25' (goal) 31'; Çolak 48'; Erkin 84'	(Report	Ateş 34', 64'; Altın (yellow card) 63'; Öztürk (yellow card) 81'; Çatkıç (yellow card) 90'	Stadium: Ali Sami Yen Stadium; Referee: Bünyamin Gezer

=== UEFA Europa League ===
All times at CET

==== Second qualifying round ====
16 July 2009 First leg	Tobol (Kazakhstan)	1–1	(Turkey) Galatasaray	Kostanay, Kazakhstan
18:30	Zhumaskaliyev 2'; Mukanov (yellow card) 14'; Nurgaliev (yellow card) 38'; Irismetov (yellow card) 90+1'	(Report)	Sarp (yellow card) 40'; Zan (yellow card) 53'; Baroš 58'; Yılmaz (yellow card) 61'; Erdem (yellow card) 67' (yellow-red card) 72'	Stadium: Kostanay Central Stadium; Referee: Libor Kovarik (Czech Republic)

23 July 2009 Second leg	Galatasaray (Turkey)	2–0 (3–1 agg.)	(Kazakhstan) Tobol	Istanbul, Turkey
20:00	Sarp 64'; Çetin 90+2'	(Report)		Stadium: Ali Sami Yen Stadium; Referee: Antonio Rubinos Perez (Spain)

==== Third qualifying round ====
30 July 2009 First leg	Maccabi Netanya (Israel)	1–4	(Turkey) Galatasaray	Tel Aviv, Israel
18:40	Yampolsky 25'; Cohen (yellow card) 27'; Fransman (yellow card) 53'; Ma'abi (yellow card) 61'; Gazal (yellow card) 68'	(Report)	Balta 31'; Kewell 47'; Sarıoğlu 53'; Sarp (yellow card) 65'; Baroš 73' (yellow card) 76'	Stadium: Bloomfield Stadium; Referee: Nikolai Ivanov (Russia)

6 August 2009 Second leg	Galatasaray (Turkey)	6–0 (10–1 agg.)	(Israel) Maccabi Netanya	Istanbul, Turkey
20:00	Özbek 2', 51'; Keïta 6'; Nonda 56', 60', 90'	(Report)	Weisberg (yellow card) 89'; Fransman (yellow card) 90'; Samya (yellow card) 90+1' (yellow-red card) 90+1'	Stadium: Ali Sami Yen Stadium; Referee: Michael Leslie Dean (England)

==== Play-off round ====
20 August 2009 First leg	Galatasaray (Turkey)	5–0	(Estonia) Levadia	Istanbul, Turkey
20:45	Keïta 21', 45'; Baroš 56' (pen.); Kewell 78'; Leitan 88' (o.g.)	(Report)		Stadium: Ali Sami Yen Stadium; Referee: Cyril Zimmermann (Switzerland)

27 August 2009 Second leg	Levadia (Estonia)	1–1 (1–6 agg.)	(Turkey) Galatasaray	Tallinn, Estonia
20:00	Puri 50'; Saarelma (yellow card) 68'	(Report)	Güngör (yellow card) 22'; Nonda 64'; Elano (yellow card) 90'	Stadium: A. Le Coq Arena; Referee: István Vad (Hungary)

==== Group stage ====
Pos	Team	Pld	W	D	L	GF	GA	GD	Pts	Qualification	GAL	PAN	DB	STM
1	(Turkey) Galatasaray	6	4	1	1	12	4	+8	13	Advance to knockout phase	—	1–0	4–1	1–1
2	(Greece) Panathinaikos	6	4	0	2	7	4	+3	12	Advance to knockout phase	1–3	—	3–0	1–0
3	(Romania) Dinamo București	6	2	0	4	4	12	−8	6		0–3	0–1	—	2–1
4	(Austria) Sturm Graz	6	1	1	4	3	6	−3	4		1–0	0–1	0–1	—

Source: Soccerway

17 September 2009 1	Panathinaikos (Greece)	1–3	(Turkey) Galatasaray	Athens, Greece
19:00	Sarriegi (yellow card) 19'; Spiropoulos (yellow card) 56'; Salpingidis 78'	(Report)	Elano 5'; Franco (yellow card) 44'; Baroš 48'; Sarriegi 58' (o.g.); Aşık (yellow card) 70'; Uçar (yellow card) 76'	Stadium: Olympic Stadium; Referee: Paolo Tagliavento (Italy)

1 October 2009 2	Galatasaray (Turkey)	1–1	(Austria) Sturm Graz	Istanbul, Turkey
21:05	Baroš 63'; Aşık (yellow card) 67'; Sarıoğlu (yellow card) 73'	(Report)	Beichler 45+1'	Stadium: Ali Sami Yen Stadium; Referee: Bas Nijhuis (Netherlands)

22 October 2009 3	Galatasaray (Turkey)	4–1	(Romania) Dinamo București	Istanbul, Turkey
21:05	Kewell 32' (yellow card) 64'; Nonda 42', 46'; Akman (yellow card) 50'; Elano 58' (pen.)	(Report)	Boştină 61'; N'Doye (yellow card) 64'	Stadium: Ali Sami Yen Stadium; Referee: Martin Ingvarsson (Sweden)

5 November 2009 4	Dinamo București (Romania)	0–3	(Turkey) Galatasaray	Bucharest, Romania
19:00	N'Doye (yellow card) 48' (yellow-red card) 68'; Pulhac (yellow card) 53'	(Report)	Kewell 22'; Nonda 24'; Topal 55'	Stadium: Stadionul Dinamo; Referee: Michael Weiner (Germany)

3 December 2009 5	Galatasaray (Turkey)	1–0	(Greece) Panathinaikos	Istanbul, Turkey
21:05	Turan (yellow card) 25'; Kewell (yellow card) 44'; Silva 50' (o.g.); Sarp (yellow card) 90+1'	(Report)	Darlas (yellow card) 41'; Cissé (yellow card) 53'	Stadium: Ali Sami Yen Stadium; Referee: Ivan Bebek (Croatia)

16 December 2009 6	Sturm Graz (Austria)	1–0	(Turkey) Galatasaray	Graz, Austria
19:00	Beichler 21'; Hölzl (yellow card) 44'; Lavrič (yellow card) 54'; Schildenfeld (yellow card) 78'; Bukva (yellow card) 90+4'	(Report)		Stadium: UPC-Arena; Referee: Darko Ceferin (Slovenia)

==== Knockout phase ====
===== Round of 32 =====
18 February 2010 First leg	Atlético Madrid (Spain)	1–1	(Turkey) Galatasaray	Madrid, Spain
21:05	Reyes 22'; Domínguez (yellow card) 90+2'	(Report)	Çetin (yellow card) 40'; Keïta 77'	Stadium: Vicente Calderón Stadium; Attendance: 30,000; Referee: Aleksei Nikolaev (Russia)

25 February 2010 Second leg	Galatasaray (Turkey)	1–2 (2–3 agg.)	(Spain) Atlético Madrid	Istanbul, Turkey
19:00	Topal (yellow card) 59'; Turan (yellow card) 61'; Keïta 66'; Erkin (yellow card) 80' (yellow-red card) 81'	(Report)	Simão 63'; Forlán 90'	Stadium: Ali Sami Yen Stadium; Referee: Gianluca Rocchi (Italy)

== Attendance ==
Competition	Av. Att.	Total Att.
Süper Lig	24,437	415,429
Türkiye Kupası	n/a	n/a
Europe	18,458	129,207
Total	22,693	544,636
