= 2010 CAF Confederation Cup final =

- Event: 2010 CAF Confederation Cup
| FUS Rabat | CS Sfaxien |
| (Morocco) | (Tunisia) |
| 3 | 2 |

First leg
| FUS Rabat | CS Sfaxien |
| 0 | 0 |
- Date: 28 November 2010
- Venue: Prince Moulay Abdellah Stadium, Rabat
- Referee: Mohamed Benouza (Algeria)

Second leg
| CS Sfaxien | FUS Rabat |
| 2 | 3 |
- Date: 4 December 2010
- Venue: Stade Taïeb Mhiri, Sfax
- Referee: Jerome Damon (South Africa)

The 2010 CAF Confederation Cup final was the final of 2010 CAF Confederation Cup. FUS Rabat from Morocco faced the CS Sfaxien from Tunisia.

Rabat won the second leg 3–2 at Sfaxien after the first leg ended in a scoreless draw.

== Background ==
FUS Rabat qualified for the final on their first ever participation of the CAF Confederation Cup. For CS Sfaxien it's the fourth appearance; in their previous three appearances they won the cup all three times (1998, 2007, 2008). While Sfaxien had a bye in the preliminary round, Rabat needed to play one more round to qualify for the first round.
Both teams were drawn into the same group at the group stage, where Sfaxien won the home leg 3–0 and Rabat the second leg at their home with 2–1. Both teams were already qualified for the semifinals on the second to last matchday. At those semifinals Sfaxien won after penalties against Al-Hilal from the Sudan, after both legs ended 1–0 for the representative home team.
Rabat won the first leg away at Ittihad 2–1, lost at home 0–1, but still made it to the final because of the away goals rule.

== Route to the final ==
| FUS Rabat | | | Round | CS Sfaxien | | |
|---|---|---|---|---|---|---|
| Opponent | Result | Legs | Preliminary rounds | Opponent | Result | Legs |
| (Senegal) Diaraf | 2–1 | 1–2 away, 2–0 home | Preliminary round | Bye | | |
| (Guinea) Baraka | 1–0 | 0–0 away, 1–0 home | First round | (Libya) Ahly Trípoli | 1–0 | 0–0 away, 1–0 home |
| (Mali) Stade Malien | 2–0 | 2–0 home, 0–0 away | Second round | (Egypt) Petrojet | 2–1 | 1–1 away, 1–0 home |
| (South Africa) Supersport United | 2–2 | 2–1 away, 1–0 home | Play-off | (Angola) Atlético Luanda | 3–1 | 0–0 away, 3–1 home |
| Main article: 2010 CAF Confederation Cup group stage: Group B: Team / Pld / W / D / L / GF / GA / GD / Pts; (Morocco) FUS Rabat / 6 / 4 / 1 / 1 / 7 / 6 / +1 / 13; (Tunisia) CS Sfaxien / 6 / 3 / 1 / 2 / 9 / 5 / +4 / 10; (Zambia) Zanaco / 6 / 1 / 3 / 2 / 5 / 6 / −1 / 6; (Egypt) Haras El Hodood / 6 / 0 / 3 / 3 / 4 / 8 / −4 / 3 | | | Group stage | Main article: 2010 CAF Confederation Cup group stage: Group B: Team / Pld / W / D / L / GF / GA / GD / Pts; (Morocco) FUS Rabat / 6 / 4 / 1 / 1 / 7 / 6 / +1 / 13; (Tunisia) CS Sfaxien / 6 / 3 / 1 / 2 / 9 / 5 / +4 / 10; (Zambia) Zanaco / 6 / 1 / 3 / 2 / 5 / 6 / −1 / 6; (Egypt) Haras El Hodood / 6 / 0 / 3 / 3 / 4 / 8 / −4 / 3 | | |
| Opponent | Result | Legs | Knockout stage | Opponent | Result | Legs |
| (Libya) Ittihad | 2–2 | 2–1 away, 0–1 home | Semifinals | (Sudan) Al-Hilal | 1–1 | 1–0 home, 0–1 away |

== Details ==
=== First leg ===
28 November 2010
18:30 UTC±0

| FUS Rabat (Morocco) | 0 – 0 | (Tunisia) CS Sfaxien |
|---|---|---|
| | Report |

Complex Sportif Moulay Abdellah, Rabat
Referee: Mohamed Benouza (Algeria)

=== Second leg ===
4 December 2010
18:00 UTC+1

| CS Sfaxien (Tunisia) | 2 – 3 | (Morocco) FUS Rabat |
|---|---|---|
| Rouid 44'; Zaiem 49' (pen.) | Report | Boukhriss 7'; Rokki 75'; Zouidi 89' |

Stade Taïeb Mhiri, Sfax
Referee: Jerome Damon (South Africa)
