= Abdul Keïta =

Abdul Keita may refer to:

- Abdul Kader Keïta, Ivorian footballer
- Abdul Aziz Keita, Guinean footballer
