= Étoile de Guinée =

Association football club in Guinea

- Full name: Club Sportif Étoile de Guinée
- Founded: 1996
- Ground: Stade 28 Septembre; Conakry, Guinea
- Capacity: 25,000
- League: Guinée Championnat National

Club Sportif Étoile de Guinée, called CS Étoile de Guinée or simply Étoile de Guinée is a football club based in Conakry, Guinea. Founded in 1996, the team has promoted great talents such as Alhassane Bangoura, Naby Yattara, Kanfory Sylla, and Oumar Kalabane.

In 2003 they won the Guinée Coupe Nationale.

== Car crash 191 ==
On 31. December 2019, nine players of the team died in a Bus crash in Mamou and 17 players were injured. The coach collided with the bus of Wakriya AC, who the National players Alfred Kargbo of Sierra Leone at scene and Guinean Abubacar Camara died a day later in hospital.

== Achievements ==
=== National titles ===
- Guinée Coupe Nationale: 1

Winner: 2003

- Tournoi Ruski Alumini: 1

Winner: 2002

== Performance in CAF competitions ==
- CAF Confederation Cup: 1 appearance

2004 CAF Confederation Cup – First round

== Stadium ==
Currently the team plays at the Stade 28 Septembre.
