= Leo Franco =

Argentine footballer (born 1977)

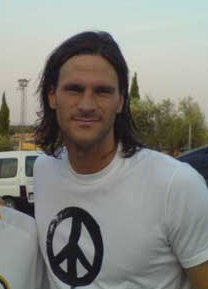
- Franco in 2009

Personal information
- Full name: Leonardo Neoren Franco
- Date of birth: 20 May 1977 (age 49)
- Place of birth: San Nicolás de los Arroyos, Argentina
- Height: 1.88 m (6 ft 2 in)
- Position: Goalkeeper

Senior career*
Years	Team	Apps	(Gls)
1995–1997	Independiente	2	(0)
1997–1998	Mérida	0	(0)
1998–1999	Mallorca B	23	(0)
1999–2004	Mallorca	148	(0)
2004–2009	Atlético Madrid	153	(0)
2009–2010	Galatasaray	26	(0)
2010–2014	Zaragoza	67	(0)
2014–2015	San Lorenzo	3	(0)
2015–2016	Huesca	28	(0)
Total		450	(0)

International career
1997	Argentina U20	6	(0)
2004–2006	Argentina	4	(0)

Managerial career
- 2018: Huesca
- * Club domestic league appearances and goals

Leonardo "Leo" Neoren Franco (born 20 May 1977) is an Argentine former professional footballer who played as a goalkeeper.

After starting out at Independiente in 1995, he went on to spend the vast majority of his career in Spain, playing 328 La Liga matches over 14 seasons in representation of Mallorca, Atlético Madrid and Zaragoza.

An Argentine international for two years, Franco appeared for the nation at the 2006 World Cup.

== Club career ==
Born in San Nicolás de los Arroyos, Buenos Aires Province, Franco started his career at Club Atlético Independiente, moving at the age of 20 to Spain with CP Mérida where he did not appear in La Liga, barred by Carlos Navarro Montoya and suffering relegation. In the following year he joined RCD Mallorca, spending his first season with their reserves and again dropping down a tier, now in the Segunda División.

Franco would be however promoted to the Balearic Islands club's first team, going on to establish himself as the starter after replacing compatriot Carlos Roa in the pecking order. In the 2000–01 campaign he appeared in 27 matches as Mallorca finished in a best-ever third position to qualify for the UEFA Champions League, and helped to win the Copa del Rey in 2003.

Franco was acquired by Atlético Madrid in June 2004, being first choice from the beginning. Until the end of 2007–08 he saved seven penalties, including two against Sevilla FC on 23 March 2006 (0–1 home loss) and two more at Real Betis on 2 December (1–0 win). Precisely during that season, he was challenged by newly signed Christian Abbiati (loaned by AC Milan), but regained his starting status in 2008–09, relegating veteran Grégory Coupet to the bench.

On 1 July 2009, aged 32, after not seeing his contract renewed, Franco left the Vicente Calderón Stadium – as Coupet– and signed with Galatasaray S.K. from Turkey. His first Süper Lig appearance took place on 9 August, in a 3–2 away victory over Gaziantepspor.

Franco returned to Spain one year later, joining Real Zaragoza on a two-year deal. He made his competitive debut on 29 August 2010, in a 0–0 draw at Deportivo de La Coruña.

Franco left Aragon in the summer of 2014, and subsequently moved to San Lorenzo de Almagro. On 24 July 2015 he moved to SD Huesca, newly promoted to the Spanish second tier.

On 19 August 2016, Franco announced his retirement at the age of 39 and was immediately named director of external relations at his last club. On 29 May 2018, he replaced the departing Rubi as first-team manager in view of their first-ever season in the top flight, being dismissed on 9 October due to poor results.

== International career ==
With the Argentina under-20 team, Franco won the 1997 FIFA World Youth Championship in Malaysia. On 6 May 2006, two years after making his debut for the senior side, he was selected by coach José Pekerman – also the manager of the under-20s – to the squad for the 2006 FIFA World Cup.

On 30 June 2006, Franco replaced the injured Roberto Abbondanzieri in the quarter-final tie against hosts Germany, failing to save one single penalty shootout attempt following a 1–1 draw.

== Career statistics ==
=== Club ===
Appearances and goals by club, season and competition
Club	Season	League			Cup		Europe		Other		Total	
Club	Season	Division	Apps	Goals	Apps	Goals	Apps	Goals	Apps	Goals	Apps	Goals
Independiente	1995–96	Argentine Primera División	1	0	—		—		—		1	0
Independiente	1996–97	Argentine Primera División	1	0	—		—		—		1	0
Independiente	Total		2	0	—		—		—		2	0
Mérida	1997–98	La Liga	0	0	—		—		—		0	0
Mallorca B	1998–99	Segunda División	23	0	—		—		—		23	0
Mallorca	1999–2000	La Liga	30	0	2	0	7	0	—		39	0
Mallorca	2000–01	La Liga	27	0	5	0	—		—		32	0
Mallorca	2001–02	La Liga	22	0	1	0	7	0	—		30	0
Mallorca	2002–03	La Liga	36	0	6	0	—		—		42	0
Mallorca	2003–04	La Liga	33	0	2	0	3	0	2	0	40	0
Mallorca	Total		148	0	16	0	17	0	2	0	183	0
Atlético Madrid	2004–05	La Liga	37	0	7	0	5	0	—		49	0
Atlético Madrid	2005–06	La Liga	34	0	2	0	—		—		36	0
Atlético Madrid	2006–07	La Liga	32	0	2	0	—		—		34	0
Atlético Madrid	2007–08	La Liga	18	0	0	0	3	0	—		21	0
Atlético Madrid	2008–09	La Liga	32	0	1	0	8	0	—		41	0
Atlético Madrid	Total		153	0	12	0	16	0	—		181	0
Galatasaray	2009–10	Süper Lig	26	0	0	0	11	0	—		37	0
Zaragoza	2010–11	La Liga	23	0	0	0	—		—		23	0
Zaragoza	2011–12	La Liga	0	0	0	0	—		—		0	0
Zaragoza	2012–13	La Liga	4	0	6	0	—		—		10	0
Zaragoza	2013–14	Segunda División	40	0	0	0	—		—		19	0
Zaragoza	Total		67	0	6	0	—		—		73	0
San Lorenzo	2014	Argentine Primera División	0	0	1	0	—		—		1	0
San Lorenzo	2015	Argentine Primera División	3	0	1	0	—		—		4	0
San Lorenzo	Total		3	0	2	0	—		—		5	0
Huesca	2015–16	Segunda División	28	0	1	0	—		—		29	0
Career total			450	0	37	0	44	0	2	0	533	0

=== International ===
Appearances and goals by national team and year
National team	Year	Apps	Goals
Argentina	2004	1	0
Argentina	2005	2	0
Argentina	2006	1	0
Total		4	0

== Managerial statistics ==
Managerial record by team and tenure
Team	Nat	From	To	Record								Ref
Team	Nat	From	To	G	W	D	L	GF	GA	GD	Win %	Ref
Huesca	(Spain)	3 June 2018	9 October 2018	8	1	2	5	7	18	−11	12.50	
Total				8	1	2	5	7	18	−11	12.50	—

== Honours ==
Mallorca

- Copa del Rey: 2002–03

Argentina

- FIFA World Youth Championship: 1997
