= 2010 CAF Confederation Cup knockout stage =

The knockout phase of the 2010 CAF Confederation Cup began on 29 October 2010 and concluded on 4 December 2010. The knockout phase involved the four teams who finished in the top two in each of their groups in the group stage. Each tie was played over two legs, with each team playing one leg at home. The team that had the higher aggregate score over the two legs progressed to the next round. In the event that aggregate scores finish level, the team that scored more goals away from home over the two legs progressed. If away goals are also equal, the tie is decided by a penalty shoot-out – with no extra time being held.

== Qualified teams ==
| Group | Winners | Runners-up |
|---|---|---|
| A | (Sudan) Al-Hilal | (Libya) Ittihad |
| B | (Morocco) FUS Rabat | (Tunisia) CS Sfaxien |

== Semifinals ==
30 October 2010
18:00 UTC+1

| CS Sfaxien (Tunisia) | 1 – 0 | (Sudan) Al-Hilal |
|---|---|---|
| Zaiem 36' | Report |

Stade Taïeb Mhiri, Sfax
Referee: Muhmed Ssegonga (Uganda)
14 November 2010
20:00 UTC+3

| Al-Hilal (Sudan) | 1 – 0 | (Tunisia) CS Sfaxien |
|---|---|---|
| Mudather 11' | Report |
Penalties
| | 3 – 5 |

AlHilal Stadium, Omdurman
Referee: Rajindraparsad Seechurn (Mauritius)

1–1 on aggregate. CS Sfaxien won on penalties.

29 October 2010
19:00 UTC+2

| Ittihad (Libya) | 1 – 2 | (Morocco) FUS Rabat |
|---|---|---|
| Al Shibani 89' | Report | El Fatihi 18'; Benchrifa 47' |

June 11 Stadium, Tripoli
Attendance: 40,000
Referee: Badara Diatta (Senegal)
12 November 2010
19:00 UTC±0

| FUS Rabat (Morocco) | 0 – 1 | (Libya) Ittihad |
|---|---|---|
| | Report | Zuway 33' |

Complex Sportif Moulay Abdellah, Rabat
Referee: Djamel Haimoudi (Algeria)

2–2 on aggregate. FUS Rabat won on the away goals rule.

== Final ==
28 November 2010
18:30 UTC±0

| FUS Rabat (Morocco) | 0 – 0 | (Tunisia) CS Sfaxien |
|---|---|---|
| | Report |

Complex Sportif Moulay Abdellah, Rabat
Referee: Mohamed Benouza (Algeria)
4 December 2010
18:00 UTC+1

| CS Sfaxien (Tunisia) | 2 – 3 | (Morocco) FUS Rabat |
|---|---|---|
| Rouid 44'; Zaiem 49' (pen.) | Report | Boukhriss 7'; Rokki 75'; Zouidi 89' |

Stade Taïeb Mhiri, Sfax
Referee: Jerome Damon (South Africa)

FUS Rabat won 3–2 on aggregate.
