= Giovani dos Santos =

Mexican footballer (born 1989)

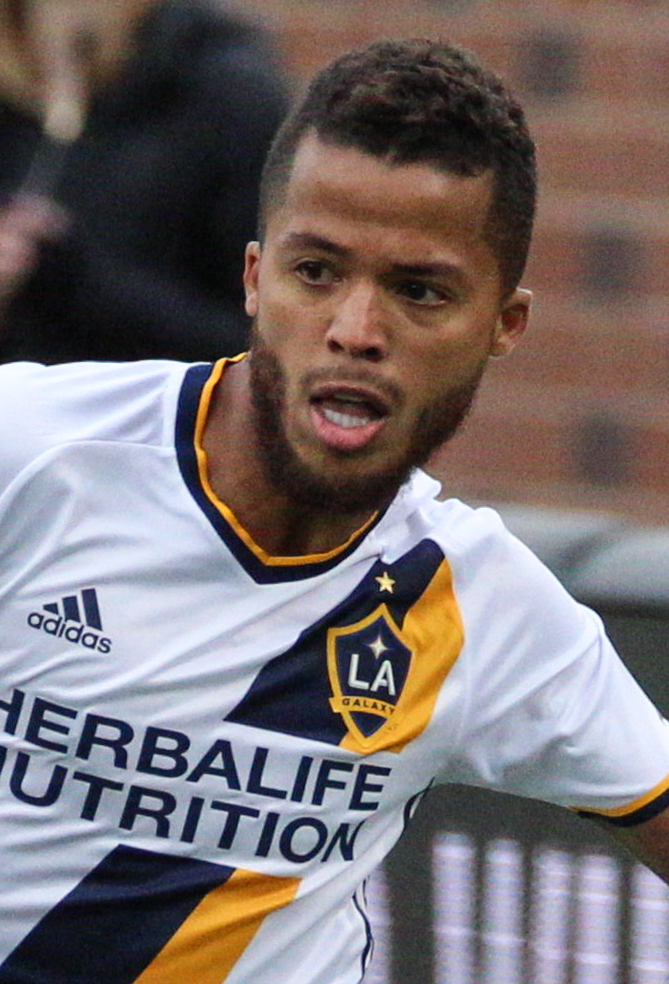
- Dos Santos with LA Galaxy in 2017

Personal information
- Full name: Giovani dos Santos Ramírez
- Date of birth: 11 May 1989 (age 37)
- Place of birth: Mexico City, Mexico
- Height: 1.74 m (5 ft 9 in)
- Positions: Attacking midfielder; winger; striker

Youth career
- Monterrey
- 2002–2006: Barcelona

Senior career*
Years	Team	Apps	(Gls)
2006–2007	Barcelona B	27	(6)
2007–2008	Barcelona	28	(3)
2008–2012	Tottenham Hotspur	17	(0)
2009	→ Ipswich Town (loan)	8	(4)
2010	→ Galatasaray (loan)	14	(0)
2011	→ Racing Santander (loan)	16	(5)
2012–2013	Mallorca	29	(6)
2013–2015	Villarreal	57	(12)
2015–2018	LA Galaxy	77	(26)
2019–2021	América	39	(4)
Total		312	(66)

International career
2005	Mexico U17	8	(2)
2007	Mexico U20	6	(5)
2012	Mexico U23	9	(3)
2007–2018	Mexico	106	(19)
Medal record
Men's football
Representing Mexico
FIFA U-17 World Championship
Winner	2005 Peru	U-17 Team
Olympic Games
Gold medal – first place	2012 London	Team
CONCACAF Gold Cup
Winner	2009 United States
Winner	2011 United States
Winner	2015 United States–Canada
- * Club domestic league appearances and goals

Giovani dos Santos Ramírez (Spanish pronunciation: [ɟʝoˈβani ðos ˈsantos] Brazilian Portuguese: [dus ˈsɐ̃tus]; born 11 May 1989) is a Mexican former professional footballer. A versatile forward, dos Santos played as an attacking midfielder, winger, and secondary striker.

At the age of 12, Dos Santos was recruited by the Spanish club Barcelona, where he progressed through the club's youth system and represented Barcelona Atlètic before making his senior debut in 2007 at the age of 18. That same year, World Soccer magazine named him one of its "Top 50 Most Exciting Teen Footballers." After spending one season with Barcelona's first team, he joined Premier League side Tottenham Hotspur in search of greater playing opportunities. However, his time in England was largely defined by a series of loan spells, including stints at Ipswich Town, Galatasaray, and Racing de Santander, with varying degrees of success. After leaving Tottenham, Dos Santos continued his career with Mallorca, Villarreal, and LA Galaxy before eventually joining Club América, the final club of his professional career.

Dos Santos was a member of the Mexico under-17 team that won the 2005 FIFA U-17 World Championship held in Peru. He made his debut for the senior national team in a 1–0 victory over Panama on 9 September 2007, and represented El Tri at the 2010, 2014, and 2018 FIFA World Cups, along with the 2013 and 2017 FIFA Confederations Cup. With Mexico, Dos Santos has won the CONCACAF Gold Cup in 2009, 2011 and 2015, scoring in the 2009 and 2011 finals and winning the MVP award in 2009. He was also a member of Mexico's team that won the gold-medal at the 2012 Summer Olympics.

== Club career ==
=== Barcelona ===
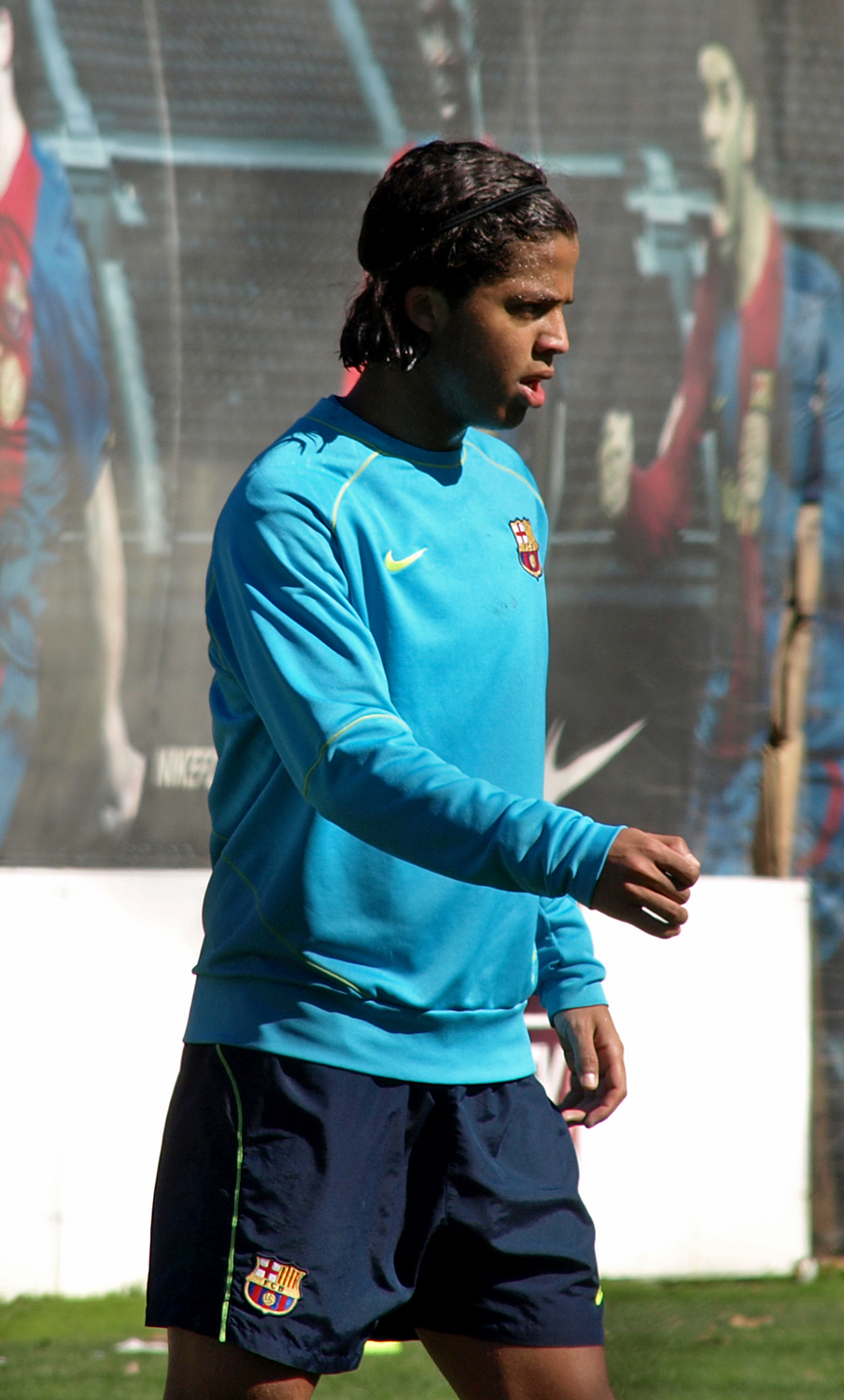
Dos Santos with Barcelona in 2008

Born in Mexico City, Dos Santos joined Barcelona's academy of La Masia at age 13 and played for Barcelona's Juvenil A category, where he helped his team to make a comeback in the league and win the regional title. This title allowed them to participate in the Youth Copa del Rey, where they faced other regional champions, among them their historic arch-rivals, Real Madrid. Dos Santos once again played a significant role during the tournament and helped the team win the national title of the Juvenil A category.

In 2006, Dos Santos was invited on the pre-season tour of Barcelona's senior squad; during a friendly match on 29 July 2006, he scored in his senior team debut game against Danish club AGF Aarhus. On 28 November 2006, Barcelona included Dos Santos in their 23-man squad for the FIFA Club World Cup in Japan.

During mid-2007, Dos Santos was once again invited to join Barcelona's senior squad on their pre-season tour. On 29 August 2007, he received dual nationality and was included in the official first team squad. He made his competitive and league debut on 2 September 2007 (at 18 years and 114 days) during a 3–1 home win against Athletic Bilbao, coming on for Thierry Henry in the 62nd minute.

Dos Santos made his UEFA Champions League debut on 20 September 2007 during a 3–0 home win against Lyon. He came on as a substitute for Xavi in the 79th minute.

On 17 May 2008, Dos Santos scored a hat-trick against Real Murcia, with a final score of 5–3, granting a victory to Barça on the team's last game of the 2007–08 season. It was also the last game Dos Santos played before joining Tottenham Hotspur.

=== Tottenham Hotspur ===
On 18 June 2008, Dos Santos passed a medical and agreed terms to complete his move to Tottenham from Barcelona. Barcelona reported that the transfer fee was €6 million with an additional €5 million payable depending on appearances for Tottenham.

Dos Santos was on target twice as Tottenham beat local Spanish side Tavernes in 8–0 on their 2008–09 pre-season tour. He also played in Spurs' other pre-season games including the 5–1 wins over Leyton Orient and Norwich City. He also scored the second goal in the 3–0 win over Borussia Dortmund to help Spurs to make it two wins out of two and take home the Feyenoord Jubileum Tournament trophy. He scored his first competitive goal for Spurs in the UEFA Cup on 26 February 2009 against Shakhtar Donetsk. After 12 first team appearances, he was sent on loan to Ipswich Town for the remainder of the season.

Dos Santos returned to Tottenham at the start of the 2009–10 season and his first game of the season came against Doncaster Rovers in the League Cup, in which he provided an assist. He was substituted off, however, due to an ankle injury early on in a League Cup game against Preston North End and managed to make only a substitute appearance in a 1–0 loss to Wolverhampton Wanderers.

Dos Santos' commitment was questioned by then Tottenham boss Harry Redknapp, who warned him to stay away from nightclubs and revealed that he was often late for training on Mondays.

Dos Santos scored and had an assist in Tottenham's UEFA Europa League group match against Shamrock Rovers on 29 September 2011 at White Hart Lane. On 7 January 2012, he scored a goal and completed an assist for a 3–0 win against Cheltenham Town in the third round of the FA Cup.

==== Ipswich Town (loan) ====
In March 2009, Dos Santos signed on loan at Ipswich Town until the end of the season. He made his debut on 14 March 2009, coming on as a substitute against Reading. He scored his first league goal and the equaliser in the following game against Burnley. He scored his second goal against Bristol City on Easter Monday, a 94th-minute penalty to equalise for Ipswich. He also claimed an assist and a goal from the penalty spot in Ipswich's 3–2 win over local rivals Norwich City a week later. He finished his loan with four goals in eight appearances.

==== Galatasaray (loan) ====
In January 2010, Dos Santos signed for Turkish club Galatasaray on loan for the remainder of the 2009–10 season, with an option to purchase him at the end of that period. The move reunited the player with Frank Rijkaard, his former coach at Barcelona. On 31 January, Dos Santos made his debut coming on as a 58th-minute substitute for Emre Çolak in a Süper Lig game against Denizlispor, a 2–1 victory. He returned to Tottenham in the summer having failed to score for Galatasaray, and stayed there for half a season before being loaned to La Liga club Racing de Santander in January.

==== Racing Santander (loan) ====
On 31 January 2011, Dos Santos joined La Liga side Racing de Santander on loan until the end of the season from Tottenham. He made his debut for his new club on 5 February 2011 as a substitute against Real Zaragoza, drawing the game 1–1. He scored his first goal as a substitute against Villarreal in the 68th minute on 27 February 2011. Dos Santos scored a brace in a 3–2 win league match over Hércules.

=== Mallorca ===
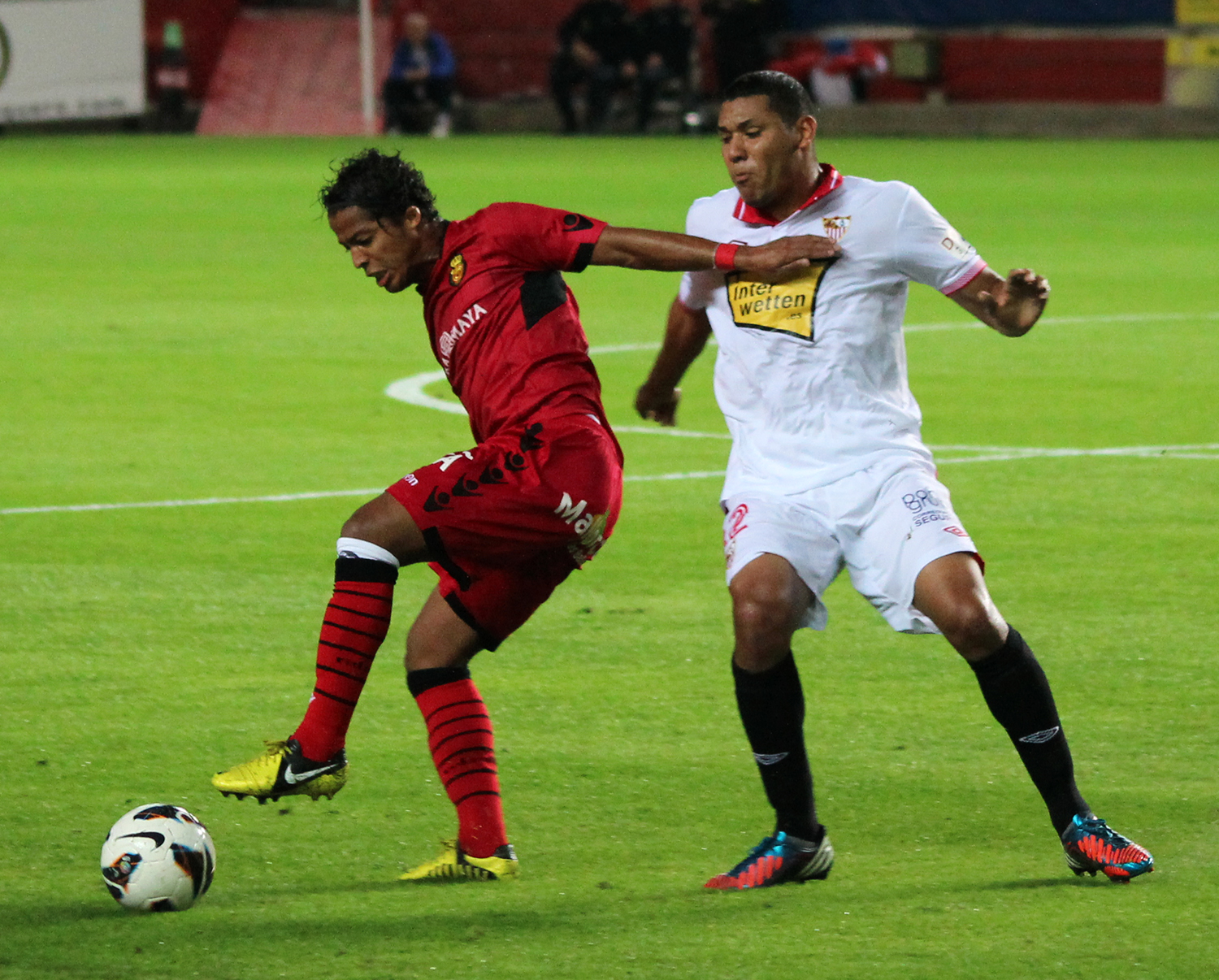
Dos Santos against Sevilla midfielder Hedwiges Maduro

It was reported that Dos Santos had told Tottenham that he wanted a move in the summer of 2012 or else he would leave on a free transfer during the next transfer window. His agent stated there was interest from Serie A club Inter Milan as well as Sevilla.

On 31 August 2012, Dos Santos signed a four-year deal with Spanish outfit Mallorca, being introduced as their new number 9. On 22 October, he made his debut for Mallorca, playing 60 minutes and assisting both goals in a 3–2 away defeat to Sevilla. He played another 60 minutes on 28 October in a 5–0 home defeat to Real Madrid. Dos Santos scored his first goal for Mallorca against Espanyol on 18 January 2013. Though Mallorca would finish the season in 18th place and was relegated, Dos Santos was a mainstay in the squad, amassing 32 total appearances and finished as their top goal-scorer with six goals as well as seven assists.

=== Villarreal ===
On 9 July 2013, Dos Santos completed a much speculated move to recently promoted side Villarreal for a reported €6 million. He finished the 2013–14 season with 11 goals and 8 assists, helping the club finish the season in sixth place.

=== Los Angeles Galaxy ===
On 15 July 2015, the Major League Soccer club LA Galaxy announced the signing of dos Santos as a Designated Player, in a reported US$7 million deal.

On 6 August, dos Santos made his competitive debut and scored his first competitive goal for the Galaxy in a CONCACAF Champions League fixture against Trinidadian side Central FC. Three days later, he made his MLS debut and scored a goal and provided an assist in the 3–1 win over Seattle Sounders FC.

On October 2, it was reported that dos Santos made that year's FIFA Ballon d'Or longlist.

In July 2016, dos Santos was included in the roster for the 2016 MLS All-Star Game. On 21 July 2016, he came off of the bench during the quarter-finals of the U.S. Open Cup, scoring within three minutes of coming onto the pitch. The goal help the Galaxy start a comeback leading to a 4–2 victory over Seattle Sounders to advance to the semi-finals for the first time in ten years.

In July 2017, Dos Santos was included in the roster for the 2017 MLS All-Star Game.

On 1 March 2019, LA Galaxy announced they had exercised its one offseason buyout of a guaranteed contract on dos Santos, thus releasing him from the team.

=== Club América ===
On 6 July 2019, Dos Santos officially joined Mexican side Club América. He played in the Liga MX for the first time after reaching a three-year agreement with América, being handed the number 10 shirt. In his first Súper Clasico against Guadalajara on 28 September, dos Santos suffered a thigh injury following a tackle from Antonio Briseño, with the defender piercing dos Santos' skin with his studs and leaving a deep gash in his right leg. He was stretchered off the field and immediately taken to a nearby hospital. Club América later released a statement revealing the player had suffered a wound in the quadriceps of the right thigh and would require surgery, thereby ruling him out of action for up to six weeks.

On 15 June 2021, Club América released dos Santos.

== International career ==
=== Youth ===
Dos Santos participated at the 2001 Danone Nations Cup that was held at the Parc des Princes, Paris, where 40 countries also participated. Mexico would finish the tournament fifth, and Dos Santos won the Golden Boot award for top goalscorer.

During the 2005 FIFA U-17 World Championship, which his team won, Dos Santos assisted half of the goals of Mexico during the tournament, a feat that won him the Adidas Silver Ball as the second best player of the tournament, finishing behind only to Brazilian midfielder Anderson.

In the U-20 World Cup Qualifiers, Dos Santos scored twice; once against St. Kitts and Nevis in the 86th minute and the second against Jamaica in the 56th minute. He was forced to sit out the last game for precautionary reasons against Costa Rica, as he had received a yellow card in the previous match. The game ended in a 1–1 draw, but Mexico still qualified, finishing top of the regional group.

During the 2007 FIFA U-20 World Cup, Mexico was placed in Group C, where they were drawn against Gambia, Portugal and New Zealand. On 2 July 2007, Dos Santos and the rest of the Mexico team played against Gambia and won 3–0, with Dos Santos opening the scoring in the second half with a volley into the top left-hand corner from outside of the box. He then played against Portugal, where Mexico won 2–1, scoring the opening goal from the penalty spot. As Mexico had already qualified from the group, he was rested for the game against New Zealand. In the round of 16, Mexico played against Congo and Dos Santos returned to the starting line-up and yet again opened the scoring with a goal from the penalty spot in a match that Mexico won 3–0. In the quarter-finals, Mexico was eliminated by Argentina by an own goal on the second-half, which was the only goal of the game in a 1–0. Dos Santos was awarded the Adidas Bronze Ball.

In June 2012, Dos Santos was called up to play with the under-23 squad that would participate at the 2012 London Olympics. On 29 July, he started on the bench but later scored his first two goals against Gabon, earning Mexico a 2–0 win. Dos Santos scored his third goal of the tournament on 4 August against Senegal, scoring a crucial tie breaking goal in the 98th minute of extra time to give Mexico a 3–2 lead, which eventually led to a 4–2 win. He was in the starting XI for the semi-final match against Japan and played the first half of the game, but was substituted out for Raúl Jiménez in the 46th minute due to an injury, which ultimately ruled him out of the final against Brazil. Dos Santos was, however, on the bench and watched Mexico defeat Brazil 2–1 at Wembley Stadium.

=== Senior ===
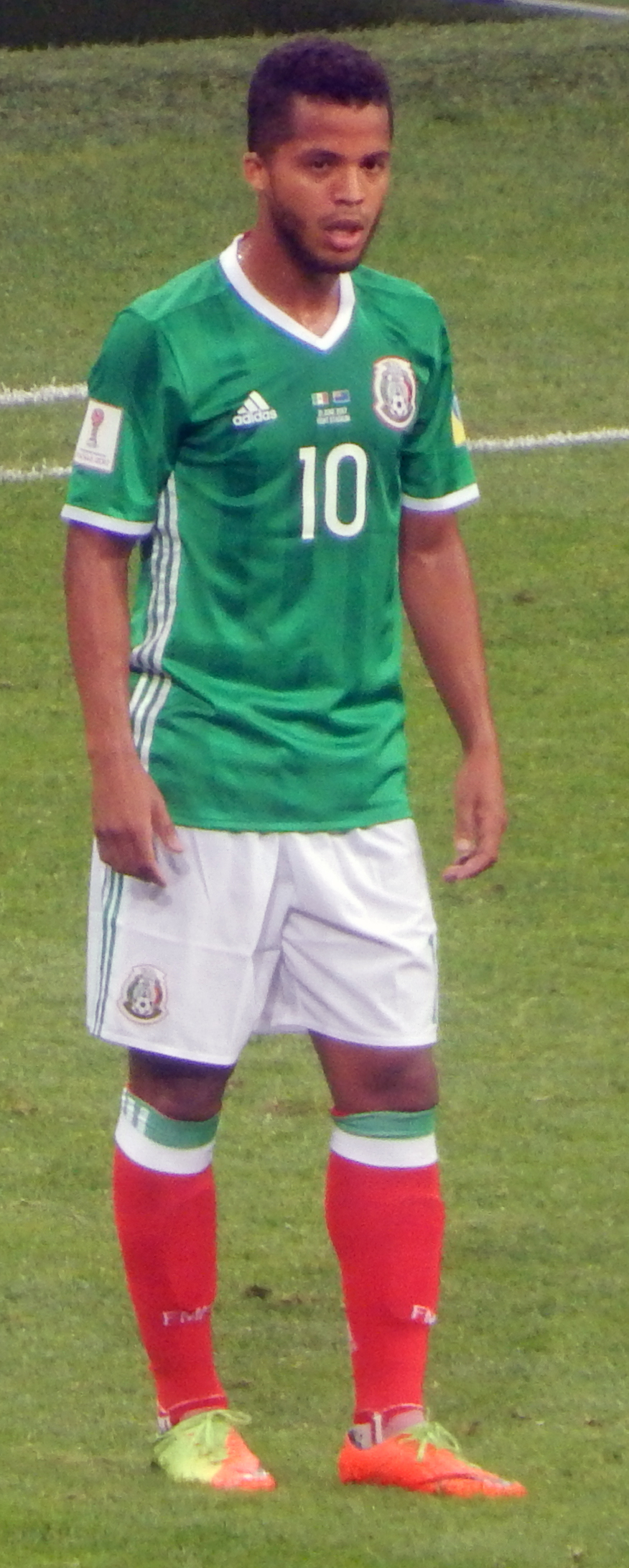
Dos Santos playing for Mexico in 2017

Dos Santos earned his first selection in the senior team roster when Hugo Sánchez picked him for exhibition games against Panama and Brazil. Dos Santos appeared for the first time for Mexico in a 1–0 victory over Panama on 9 September 2007 wearing the number 10 jersey. The match was abandoned at half time because of heavy rain. He scored his first two goals for Mexico on 24 June 2009 in a friendly match against Venezuela, a game in which he was also named Man of the Match.

Dos Santos scored his third goal for Mexico on 19 July in the 2009 CONCACAF Gold Cup quarter-final game against Haiti in the 42nd minute and also recorded two assists in the 4–0 victory. On 26 July 2009, he helped Mexico end a ten-year drought of victory against the United States on American soil with a 5–0 victory that helped secure Mexico's fifth CONCACAF Gold Cup. He was named player of the tournament.

On 5 September 2009, Dos Santos contributed to all three goals in a 3–0 win over Costa Rica in the 2010 FIFA World Cup qualification stages. He scored the first goal from outside the penalty box with his preferred left foot and assisted in the following two goals.

When his brother Jonathan dos Santos was cut from Mexico's final 23-man squad for the 2010 World Cup, his father Zizinho said that Giovani was very hurt and claimed he was unsure whether he would play in the World Cup.

At the 2010 World Cup, Dos Santos started in every game for Mexico as a right winger. He completed 138 passes without providing an assist. He was voted runner-up for the FIFA Young Player of the Tournament award, which eventually went to Thomas Müller of Germany.

Dos Santos was called up to play the 2011 CONCACAF Gold Cup after a good mid-season loan to Racing de Santander. On 9 June 2011, he scored a brace against Cuba in a 5–0 win. In the final match against the United States, he scored in a 4–2 win by dribbling inside the box against goalkeeper Tim Howard and chipping the ball into the top-left corner over Eric Lichaj – that goal was named as the best goal of the tournament.

Dos Santos was called up by Miguel Herrera to play the 2014 World Cup. He played in Mexico's World Cup opener against Cameroon, and on 29 June 2014, opened the scoring in a 2–1 round of 16 defeat against the Netherlands with a left-footed long range strike.

In May 2018, Dos Santos was named in Mexico's preliminary 28-man squad for the 2018 FIFA World Cup in Russia, and in June, was ultimately included in the final 23-man roster for the tournament.

== Style of play ==
Dos Santos was capable of playing in several offensive positions. He was usually deployed as a winger or as an attacking midfielder, and has even been used as a supporting striker. A playmaker who possesses specific flair and dribbling skills, he was described as a "clever" and "sharp" player who had the capacity to both score goals and create chances for teammates. As a youngster, he drew attention to himself for talent, and in 2010 he was named by Don Balón as one of the 100 best young players in the world born after 1989.

== Personal life ==
Dos Santos is the son of former Brazilian footballer Zizinho, who played for Mexico clubs América and León in the late 1980s. His mother, Liliana Ramírez, is Mexican. Dos Santos has two brothers and two half-brothers; the elder, Éder, played for América's reserves team as a defensive midfielder before retiring in 2009, and his younger brother, Jonathan, currently plays for América. Dos Santos has appeared on the cover of the MLS custom editions of FIFA 16 and FIFA 17.

== Career statistics ==
=== Club ===
Appearances and goals by club, season and competition
Club	Season	League			Cup^{1}		Continental^{2}		Other^{3}		Total	
Club	Season	Division	Apps	Goals	Apps	Goals	Apps	Goals	Apps	Goals	Apps	Goals
Barcelona B	2006–07	Segunda División B	27	6	—		—		—		27	6
Barcelona	2007–08	La Liga	28	3	5	0	5	1	—		38	4
Tottenham Hotspur	2008–09	Premier League	6	0	1	0	4	1	1	0	12	1
Tottenham Hotspur	2009–10	Premier League	1	0	—		—		2	0	3	0
Tottenham Hotspur	2010–11	Premier League	3	0	—		1	0	1	0	5	0
Tottenham Hotspur	2011–12	Premier League	7	0	1	1	4	1	1	0	13	2
Tottenham Hotspur	Total		17	0	2	1	9	2	5	0	33	3
Ipswich Town (loan)	2008–09	Championship	8	4	—		—		—		8	4
Galatasaray (loan)	2009–10	Süper Lig	14	0	2	0	2	0	—		18	0
Racing Santander (loan)	2010–11	La Liga	16	5	—		—		—		16	5
Mallorca	2012–13	La Liga	29	6	3	0	—		—		32	6
Villarreal	2013–14	La Liga	31	11	3	1	—		—		34	12
Villarreal	2014–15	La Liga	26	1	7	1	6	3	—		39	5
Villarreal	Total		57	12	10	2	6	3	—		73	17
LA Galaxy	2015	MLS	10	3	—		2	1	1	0	13	4
LA Galaxy	2016	MLS	28	14	2	1	2	0	3	1	35	16
LA Galaxy	2017	MLS	25	6	1	0	—		—		26	6
LA Galaxy	2018	MLS	14	3	—		—		—		14	3
LA Galaxy	Total		77	26	3	1	4	1	4	1	88	29
América	2019–20	Liga MX	21	2	—		2	0	1	0	24	2
América	2020–21	Liga MX	18	2	—		—		—		18	2
América	Total		39	4	—		2	0	1	0	42	4
Career total			312	66	25	4	28	7	10	1	375	78

- 1.Includes Copa del Rey, FA Cup, and U.S. Open Cup
- 2.Includes UEFA Champions League, UEFA Europa League, and CONCACAF Champions League
- 3.Includes English League Cup, MLS Cup playoffs, and Leagues Cup

=== International ===
Appearances and goals by national team and year
National team	Year	Apps	Goals
Mexico	2007	4	0
Mexico	2008	6	0
Mexico	2009	11 (Note: Dos Santos additionally played a match against Guadeloupe in 2009, which is not recognized by FIFA.)	5
Mexico	2010	12	1
Mexico	2011	19	5
Mexico	2012	6	3
Mexico	2013	14	0
Mexico	2014	10	1
Mexico	2015	7	2
Mexico	2016	4	1
Mexico	2017	8	0
Mexico	2018	5	1
Total		106	19

Scores and results list Mexico's goal tally first, score column indicates score after each dos Santos goal.

List of international goals scored by Giovani dos Santos
No.	Date	Venue	Opponent	Score	Result	Competition
1	23 June 2009	Georgia Dome, Atlanta, United States	Venezuela	2–0	4–0	Friendly
2	23 June 2009	Georgia Dome, Atlanta, United States	Venezuela	3–0	4–0	Friendly
3	19 July 2009	Cowboys Stadium, Arlington, United States	Haiti	2–0	4–0	2009 CONCACAF Gold Cup
4	26 July 2009	Giants Stadium, East Rutherford, United States	United States	2–0	5–0	2009 CONCACAF Gold Cup
5	5 September 2009	Estadio Ricardo Saprissa Aymá, San José, Costa Rica	Costa Rica	1–0	3–0	2010 FIFA World Cup qualification
6	12 October 2010	Estadio Olímpico Benito Juárez, Ciudad Juárez, Mexico	Venezuela	2–2	2–2	Friendly
7	1 June 2011	Invesco Field at Mile High, Denver, United States	New Zealand	1–0	3–0	Friendly
8	1 June 2011	Invesco Field at Mile High, Denver, United States	New Zealand	2–0	3–0	Friendly
9	9 June 2011	Bank of America Stadium, Charlotte, United States	Cuba	2–0	5–0	2011 CONCACAF Gold Cup
10	9 June 2011	Bank of America Stadium, Charlotte, United States	Cuba	4–0	5–0	2011 CONCACAF Gold Cup
11	25 June 2011	Rose Bowl, Pasadena, United States	United States	4–2	4–2	2011 CONCACAF Gold Cup
12	31 May 2012	Soldier Field, Chicago, United States	Bosnia and Herzegovina	1–0	2–1	Friendly
13	3 June 2012	Cowboys Stadium, Arlington, United States	Brazil	1–0	2–0	Friendly
14	8 June 2012	Estadio Azteca, Mexico City, Mexico	Guyana	2–0	3–1	2014 FIFA World Cup qualification
15	29 June 2014	Estádio Castelão, Fortaleza, Brazil	Netherlands	1–0	1–2	2014 FIFA World Cup
16	27 June 2015	Citrus Bowl, Orlando, United States	Costa Rica	1–2	2–2	Friendly
17	9 July 2015	Soldier Field, Chicago, United States	Cuba	6–0	6–0	2015 CONCACAF Gold Cup
18	9 October 2016	Nissan Stadium, Nashville, United States	New Zealand	1–0	2–1	Friendly
19	2 June 2018	Estadio Azteca, Mexico City, Mexico	Scotland	1–0	1–0	Friendly

== Honours ==
Barcelona

- La Liga runner-up: 2006–07
- Supercopa de España: 2006
- UEFA Super Cup runner-up: 2006
- FIFA Club World Cup runner-up: 2006

Tottenham Hotspur

- EFL Cup runner-up: 2008–09
- Premier League Asia Trophy: 2009

América

- Liga MX runner-up: Apertura 2019
- Copa MX: Clausura 2019
- Campeón de Campeones: 2019
- CONCACAF Champions League runner-up: 2021
- Campeones Cup runner-up: 2019

Mexico U17

- FIFA U-17 World Championship: 2005

Mexico U20

- CONCACAF U-20 Championship: 2007

Mexico U23

- Olympic Gold Medal: 2012

Mexico

- FIFA Confederations Cup fourth place: 2017
- CONCACAF Gold Cup: 2009, 2011, 2015
- CONCACAF Cup: 2015

Individual

- FIFA U-17 World Championship Silver Ball: 2005
- RSSSF Player of the Year Nomination: 2005
- Premio Nacional del Deporte: 2005, 2012
- FIFA Club World Cup Fair Play Trophy: 2006
- World Soccer Men's World Team of the Year: 2006
- FIFA U-20 World Cup Bronze Ball: 2007
- FIFA Fair Play Award: 2007
- World Soccer Magazine 5th Most Exciting Teen Footballer: 2007
- Golden Boy Nomination: 2008, 2009
- CONCACAF Gold Cup Golden Ball: 2009
- CONCACAF Gold Cup All-Tournament Team: 2009
- CONCACAF Gold Cup Fair Play Trophy: 2011
- CONCACAF Gold Cup Best Goal: 2011
- FIFA Puskás Award Nomination: 2011
- FIFA World Cup Man of the Match: 13 June 2014
- La Liga Best Goal Nomination: 2013–14
- CONCACAF President's Award: 2015
- Latinos de Hoy Sports Excellence Award: 2015
- Ballon d'Or Nomination: 2015
- MLS Player of the Week: Week 7 2016, Week 27 2016
- MLS Goal of the Week: Week 26 2016
- LA Galaxy Player of the Year: 2016
- LA Galaxy Golden Boot: 2016
- LA Galaxy Most Assists: 2016
- MLS Best XI: 2016
- MLS All-Star: 2016, 2017
- Premios Univision Deportes MLS Player of the Year: 2016
- LA Galaxy All-time Roster
- FIFA Century Club
- MLS ESPN Mexican Players All Time XI
- EA Sports FC Hall of FUT: 2027

Records

- Youngest Players to Score a Hat-Trick with Barcelona
- Youngest Players to Score a Hat Trick In La Liga
- The first team to score two or more goals in every UEFA Champions League group game: 2010–11 (With Tottenham)

== See also ==
- List of footballers with 100 or more caps
