= Zizinho (footballer, born 1962) =

Brazilian footballer (1962–2021)

Personal information
- Full name: Geraldo Francisco dos Santos
- Date of birth: 11 June 1962
- Place of birth: São Paulo, Brazil
- Date of death: 29 July 2021 (aged 59)
- Place of death: Los Angeles, California, United States
- Position: Midfielder

Youth career
- –1977: São Paulo

Senior career*
Years	Team	Apps	(Gls)
1978–1980	São Paulo		
1980–1982	América		
1982–1983	León		
1983–1984	América		
1984–1985	Necaxa		
1986–1987	FAS		
1987–1989	Monterrey		
1990–1991	León		
1993–1997	Monterrey La Raza (indoor)		
- * Club domestic league appearances and goals

Geraldo Francisco dos Santos (11 June 1962 – 29 July 2021), nicknamed Zizinho, was a Brazilian professional footballer who played as a midfielder.

== Career ==
Born in São Paulo, started his career with São Paulo FC, being the youngest player and goal scorer of the club in 1978, aged only 15 years and 311 days.

Began his professional career in Mexico in 1980 with América. He also played for León and Necaxa, making a total of 135 appearances, scoring 27 goals, in the Primera División de México.

Dos Santos played in MISL for Los Angeles Lazers for the 1986 and 1987 seasons.

He later played for Monterrey La Raza, an indoor team that played in the Continental Indoor Soccer League, between 1993 and 1997.

== Personal life ==
Dos Santos had three sons, who were also all footballers: Éder (born 1984), Giovani (born 1989) and Jonathan (born 1990).

He died from COVID-19 on 29 July 2021, at the age of 59.
