= 2010 CAF Confederation Cup group stage =

- Dates: 13 August – 17 October 2010

Tournament statistics
- Matches played: 24
- Goals scored: 53 (2.21 per match)

The 2010 CAF Confederation Cup group stage matches took place between 13 August and 17 October 2010.

The group stage featured 8 qualifiers from the CAF Confederation Cup playoffs.

At the completion of the group stage, the top two teams in each group advanced to play in the semifinals.

== Groups ==
Key to colours in group tables
Group winners and runners-up advance to the semifinals

=== Group A ===
Team	Pld	W	D	L	GF	GA	GD	Pts	HIL	ITT	DAC	ASF
(Sudan) Al-Hilal	6	4	1	1	10	6	+4	13	—	2–0	2–1	4–2
(Libya) Ittihad	6	4	0	2	11	5	+6	12	1–2	—	2–0	4–0
(Mali) Djoliba	6	2	1	3	4	5	−1	7	2–0	0–1	—	1–0
(Niger) ASFAN	6	0	2	4	3	12	−9	2	0–0	1–3	0–0	—

14 August 2010
16:00 (UTC+1)

ASFAN (Niger)	0–0	(Mali) Djoliba
	Report

Stade Général Seyni Kountché, Niamey
Referee: Jean-M Moukoko (Congo)
15 August 2010
22:00 (UTC+2)

Ittihad (Libya)	1–2	(Sudan) Al-Hilal
Rahouma 65'	Report	Haitham 24' (pen.); Bashir 67'

June 11 Stadium, Tripoli
Referee: Crespin Aguidissou (Benin)

29 August 2010
16:00 (UTC±0)

Djoliba (Mali)	0–1	(Libya) Ittihad
	Report	F. Katongo 72'

Stade Modibo Kéïta, Bamako
Referee: Rajindraparsad Seechurn (Mauritius)
29 August 2010
22:00 (UTC+3)

Al-Hilal (Sudan)	4–2	(Niger) ASFAN
Barry 42', 68'; Khalefa 55'; Sadomba 71'	Report	Issou 7'; Saif Eldin 45' (o.g.)

AlHilal Stadium, Omdurman
Referee: Jean-Claude Labrosse (Seychelles)

10 September 2010
20:30 (UTC+3)

Al-Hilal (Sudan)	2–1	(Mali) Djoliba
Mudather 21'; Bashir 35'	Report	Cissé 90+1'

AlHilal Stadium, Omdurman
Referee: Kaoma Wellington (Zambia)
12 September 2010
20:30 (UTC+2)

Ittihad (Libya)	4–0	(Niger) ASFAN
Koulibaly 7', 35'; Mani 52'; Zuway 59' (pen.)	Report

June 11 Stadium, Tripoli
Referee: Bennaceur Kacem (Tunisia)

18 September 2010
16:00 (UTC+1)

ASFAN (Niger)	1–3	(Libya) Ittihad
Boulou 71'	Report	al Shibani 18'; Koulibaly 41'; Zuway 82'

Stade Général Seyni Kountché, Niamey
Referee: Haimoudi Djamel (Algeria)
19 September 2010
16:00 (UTC±0)

Djoliba (Mali)	2–0	(Sudan) Al-Hilal
Coulibaly 29'; Sidibé 90+2'	Report

Stade Modibo Kéïta, Bamako
Referee: Martin De Carvalho (Angola)

3 October 2010
16:00 (UTC±0)

Djoliba (Mali)	1–0	(Niger) ASFAN
Bangoura 57'	Report

Stade Modibo Kéïta, Bamako
Referee: Trabelsi Aouaz (Tunisia)
3 October 2010
20:00 (UTC+3)

Al-Hilal (Sudan)	2–0	(Libya) Ittihad
Sadomba 4'; Bashir 63'	Report

AlHilal Stadium, Omdurman
Referee: Samir Osman (Egypt)

16 October 2010
16:00 (UTC+1)

ASFAN (Niger)	0–0	(Sudan) Al-Hilal
	Report

Stade Général Seyni Kountché, Niamey
Referee: Ndum Gil Sebastien (Gabon)
16 October 2010
17:00 (UTC+2)

Ittihad (Libya)	2–0	(Mali) Djoliba
Mani 5'; Zuway 24'	Report

June 11 Stadium, Tripoli
Referee: Cordier Adam (Chad)

=== Group B ===
Team	Pld	W	D	L	GF	GA	GD	Pts	FUS	CSS	ZAN	HEH
(Morocco) FUS Rabat	6	4	1	1	7	6	+1	13	—	2–1	1–0	1–0
(Tunisia) CS Sfaxien	6	3	1	2	9	5	+4	10	3–0	—	2–1	3–1
(Zambia) Zanaco	6	1	3	2	5	6	−1	6	1–1	1–0	—	1–1
(Egypt) Haras El Hodood	6	0	3	3	4	8	−4	3	1–2	0–0	1–1	—

14 August 2010
22:00 (UTC±0)

FUS Rabat (Morocco)	1–0	(Zambia) Zanaco
Benchrifa 57'	Report

Moulay Abdellah, Rabat
Referee: Fall Ousmane (Senegal)
15 August 2010
21:30 (UTC+2)

Haras El Hodood (Egypt)	0–0	(Tunisia) CS Sfaxien
	Report

Harras El-Hedoud Stadium, Alexandria
Referee: Fredrick Kayindi-Ngobi (Uganda)

28 August 2010
15:00 (UTC+2)

Zanaco (Zambia)	1–1	(Egypt) Haras El Hodood
Macha 47'	Report	Salama 83'

Sunset Stadium, Lusaka
Referee: Yakhouba Keita (Guinea)
28 August 2010
21:00 (UTC+1)

CS Sfaxien (Tunisia)	3–0	(Morocco) FUS Rabat
Younes 50', 74'; Abbes 71'	Report

Stade Taïeb Mhiri, Sfax
Referee: Monetchet Leonard Nahi (Ivory Coast)

11 September 2010
15:00 (UTC+2)

Zanaco (Zambia)	1–0	(Tunisia) CS Sfaxien
Kalengo 31'	Report

Sunset Stadium, Lusaka
Referee: Sidibé Ousmane (Mali)
12 September 2010
19:00 (UTC±0)

FUS Rabat (Morocco)	1–0	(Egypt) Haras El Hodood
Rokki 57'	Report

Moulay Abdellah, Rabat
Referee: Lemghaifry Ali (Mauritania)

17 September 2010
19:00 (UTC+1)

CS Sfaxien (Tunisia)	2–1	(Zambia) Zanaco
Toure 26'; Agba 60'	Report	Nyirenda 43'

Stade Taïeb Mhiri, Sfax
Referee: Ragab O. Mohamed (Libya)
19 September 2010
20:30 (UTC+2)

Haras El Hodood (Egypt)	1–2	(Morocco) FUS Rabat
Elkhaliqi 22' (o.g.)	Report	El Fatihi 32'; Issoufou 55'

Harras El-Hedoud Stadium, Alexandria
Referee: Ngobi Kalyoto (Malawi)

2 October 2010
15:00 (UTC+2)

Zanaco (Zambia)	1–1	(Morocco) FUS Rabat
Silwamba	Report	Issoufou 51'

Sunset Stadium, Lusaka
Referee: Mohamadou Souley (Cameroon)
2 October 2010
19:00 (UTC+1)

CS Sfaxien (Tunisia)	3–1	(Egypt) Haras El Hodood
Hashim 2'; Younes 30'; Dridi 48'	Report	Salama 21'

Stade Taïeb Mhiri, Sfax
Referee: Ebrahim Abdul Basit (South Africa)

17 October 2010
17:00 (UTC±0)

FUS Rabat (Morocco)	2–1	(Tunisia) CS Sfaxien
El Fatihi 60'; Triki 75'	Report	Dridi 27'

Moulay Abdellah, Rabat
Referee: Kirwa Sylvester (Kenya)
17 October 2010
19:00 (UTC+2)

Haras El Hodood (Egypt)	1–1	(Zambia) Zanaco
Eid 12'	Report	Macha 69'

Harras El-Hedoud Stadium, Alexandria
Referee: Ayob Amanuel (Eritrea)
