= Abdul Aziz Keita =

Guinean footballer

Abdul Keïta
Personal information
- Full name: Abdoul Aziz Keita
- Date of birth: 17 June 1990 (age 36)
- Place of birth: Conakry, Guinea
- Height: 1.82 m (6 ft 0 in)
- Position: Goalkeeper

Youth career
- Baraka Djoma

Senior career*
Years	Team	Apps	(Gls)
2010–2011	Baraka Djoma		
2012–2017	AS Kaloum Star		
2017–2018	Buildcon F.C.		
2019	Welwalo Adigrat University F.C.		
2025–	Guinée Foot Elite		

International career
2010–2017	Guinea	24	(0)
- * Club domestic league appearances and goals

Abdul Aziz Keita (born 17 June 1990) is a Guinean professional footballer who plays as a goalkeeper.

== Club career ==
Keita started his career for Baraka Djoma. He left Baraka Djoma in January 2012 and signed for AS Kaloum.

Keita moved to Ndola-based Buildcon F.C., newly promoted to the Zambia Super League, in March 2017.

Keita was goalkeeping coach at Académie SOAR in the 2023–24 season. He joined Guinée Foot Elite as a player in January 2025, who had achieved promoted to the Guinée Championnat National the previous season.

== International career ==
Keita is a member of the Guinea national team and played for the team the 2012 Africa Cup of Nations and 2015 Africa Cup of Nations.

In the 2016 Africa Cup of Nations, he saved a penalty and scored the winning penalty kick in the quarterfinal match against Zambia to send Guinea to the semi-finals.
