= Sedat Bayrak =

Turkish professional footballer

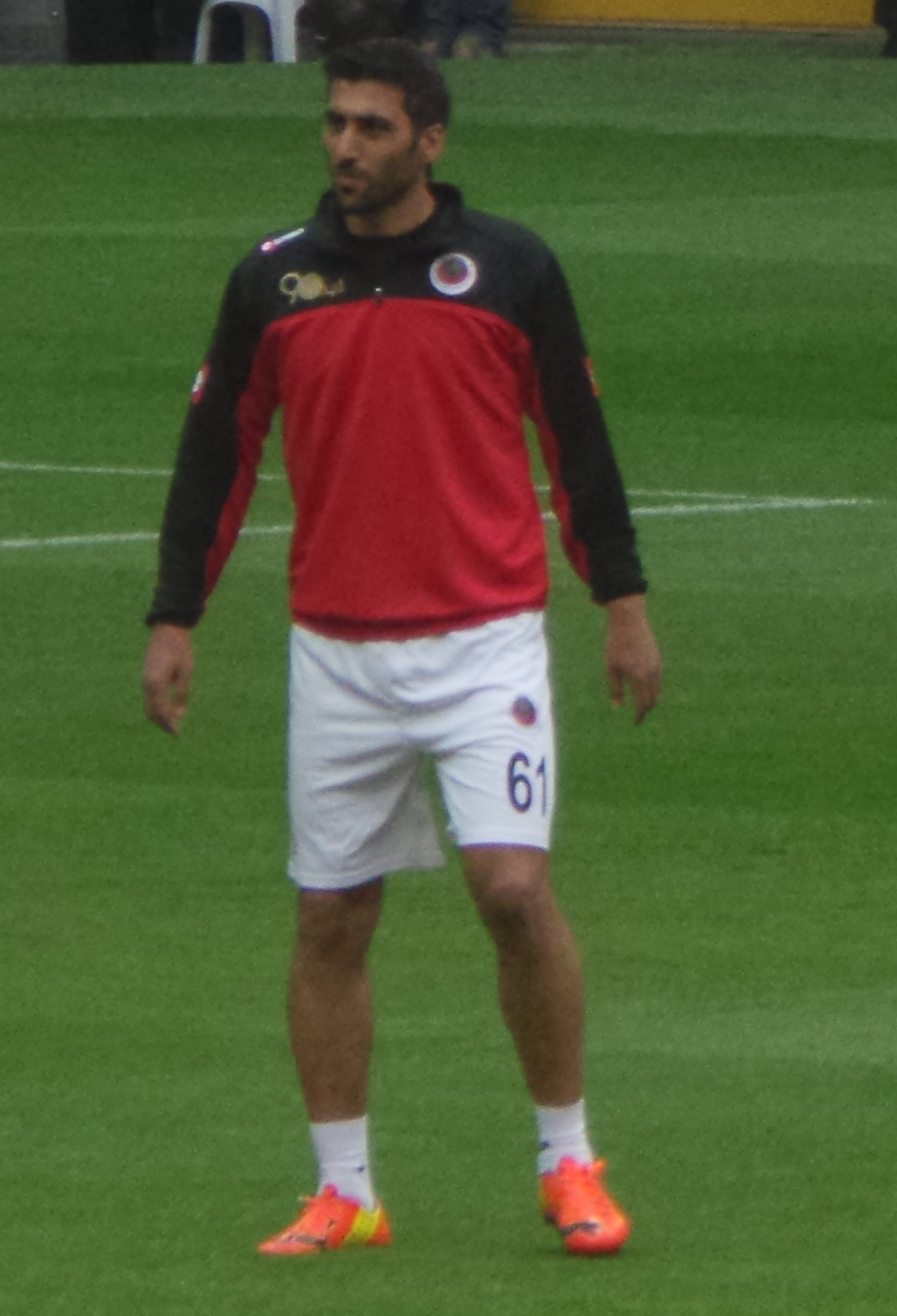

Personal information
- Full name: Sedat Bayrak
- Date of birth: 10 April 1981 (age 45)
- Place of birth: Yomra, Turkey
- Height: 1.88 m (6 ft 2 in)
- Position: Centre-back

Youth career
- 1992–1999: Yomraspor
- 1999–2000: Trabzonspor

Senior career*
Years	Team	Apps	(Gls)
2000–2001	Erzurumspor	4	(1)
2001–2005	Akçaabat Sebatspor	102	(3)
2005–2007	MKE Ankaragücü	56	(1)
2007–2011	Sivasspor	51	(5)
2011–2012	Orduspor	14	(1)
2012–2013	Elazığspor	24	(2)
2013–2015	Gençlerbirliği	20	(1)
2015–2016	Ankaragücü	9	(0)

International career
2006	Turkey A2	2	(0)
- * Club domestic league appearances and goals as of 5 January 2016

Sedat Bayrak (born 10 April 1981) is a Turkish professional footballer who last played as a centre-back for Ankaragücü.

== Club career ==
Bayrak began his career with local club Yomraspor in 1992. He spent seven years at the club before moving on to another local club, Trabzonspor. The club loaned him out to Erzurumspor for the 2000–01 season, and he was transferred to Akçaabat Sebatspor at the end of the season. He made 102 appearances for the club before he was transferred to MKE Ankaragücü in 2005. Sivasspor transferred him in 2007.

== International career ==
Bayrak received his first call up to the Turkey national football team during UEFA Euro 2008 qualifying. He was in the match squad for a match against Bosnia and Herzegovina, but did not make an appearance. He also has two caps for the Turkey A2 team.
