= Tal Ma'abi =

Israeli footballer

Tal Ma'abi טל מעבי
Personal information
- Full name: Tal Ma'abi
- Date of birth: May 15, 1985 (age 41)
- Place of birth: Haifa, Israel
- Position: Left back

Youth career
- Maccabi Haifa

Senior career*
Years	Team	Apps	(Gls)
2003–2005	Maccabi Haifa	0	(0)
2005–2006	Maccabi Herzliya	?	(?)
2006–2007	Hapoel Ashkelon	21	(0)
2007–2011	Maccabi Netanya	94	(1)
2011–2012	Maccabi Petah Tikva	27	(1)
2012–2014	Hapoel Ramat Gan	35	(0)
2014–2015	Maccabi Jaffa	30	(0)
2015	Beitar Kfar Saba	1	(0)

International career
2001	Israel U-17	10	(1)
- * Club domestic league appearances and goals as of 3 August 2014

Tal Ma'abi (Hebrew: טל מעבי; born 15 May 1985) is an Israeli footballer.

== Honours ==
- Israeli Second Division:
  - Winner (1): 2005–06
- Israel State Cup:
  - Winner (1): 2013
  - Runner-up (1): 2007
- Israeli Premier League:
  - Runner-up (1): 2007–08

== Club career statistics ==
(correct as of 5 September 2014)

Club	Season	League		Cup		Toto Cup		Europe		Total	
Club	Season	Apps	Goals	Apps	Goals	Apps	Goals	Apps	Goals	Apps	Goals
Maccabi Netanya	2007–08	21	1	0	0	8	0	0	0	29	1
Maccabi Netanya	2008–09	20	0	0	0	7	0	0	0	27	0
Maccabi Netanya	2009–10	20	0	0	0	2	0	2	0	24	0
Maccabi Netanya	2010–11	33	0	4	0	6	0	0	0	43	0
Maccabi Petah Tikva	2011–12	27	1	1	0	4	0	0	0	32	1
Hapoel Ramat Gan	2012–13	12	0	0	0	5	0	0	0	17	0
Hapoel Ramat Gan	2013–14	23	0	0	0	0	0	2	0	25	0
Maccabi Jaffa	2014–15	30	0	0	0	0	0	0	0	30	0
Career		196	2	5	0	32	0	4	0	227	2
