= Volkan Altın =

German footballer

Personal information
- Full name: Volkan Altın
- Date of birth: 10 August 1986 (age 40)
- Place of birth: Berlin, Germany
- Height: 1.73 m (5 ft 8 in)
- Position: Defensive midfielder

Team information
- Current team: BSV Hürtürkel
- Number: 8

Youth career
- Trakyaspor
- Brandenburg 03
- 2002: Tennis Borussia Berlin
- 2002–2005: Hertha BSC

Senior career*
Years	Team	Apps	(Gls)
2005–2006	Hertha BSC II	5	(0)
2006–2007	Kickers Emden	31	(1)
2007–2008	SV Sandhausen	17	(2)
2008–2011	Antalyaspor	11	(0)
2011–2013	Altay SK	26	(1)
2013–2014	Sarıyer SK	9	(0)
2014	Göztepe SK	13	(3)
2016	SC Gatow	6	(3)
2016–	BSV Hürtürkel	9	(4)
- * Club domestic league appearances and goals as of 28 November 2016

Volkan Altın (born 10 August 1986) is a German professional footballer who plays as a defensive midfielder for German club BSV Hürtürkel.
