= Mustafa Sarp =

Turkish footballer

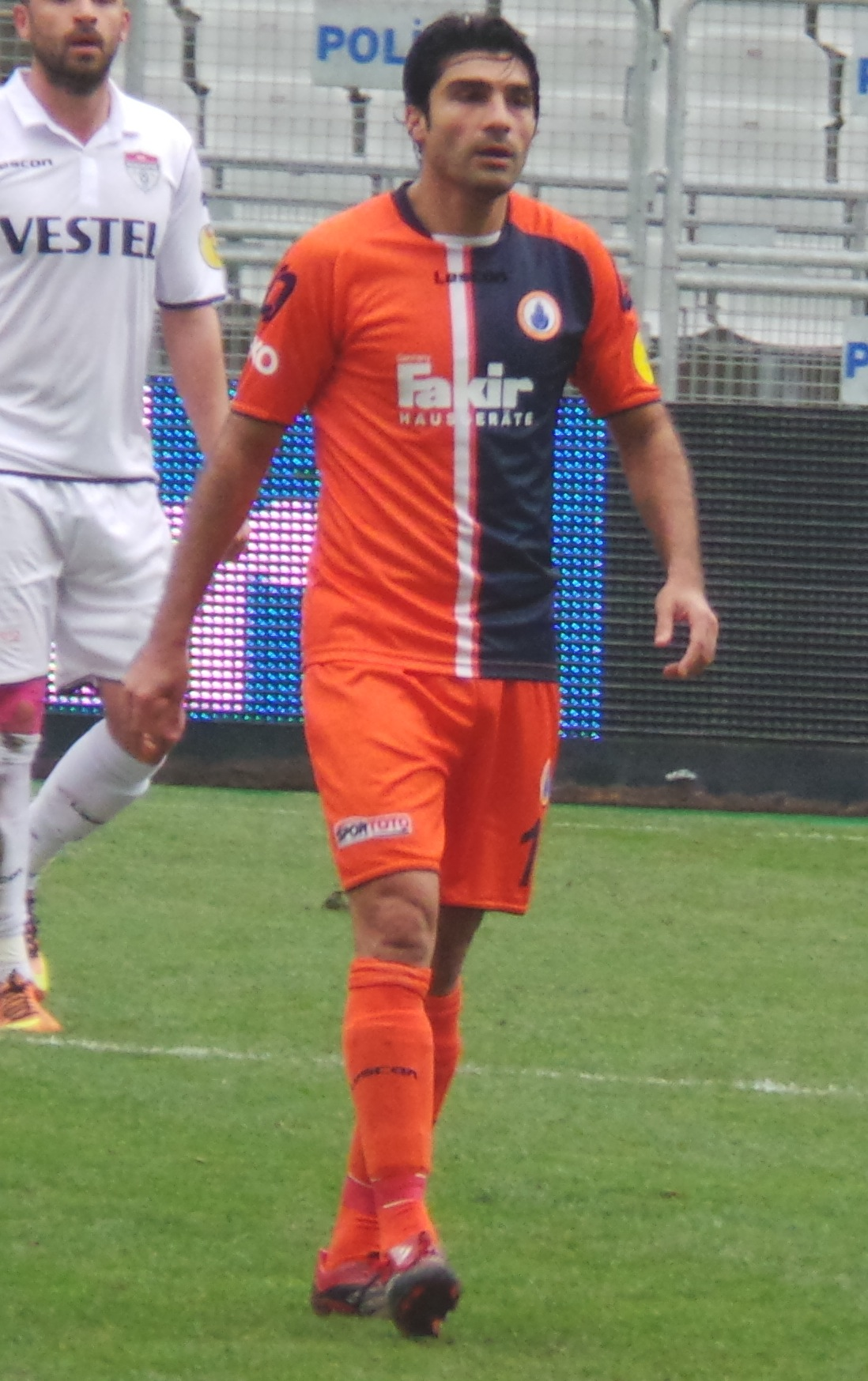

Personal information
- Full name: Mustafa Sarp
- Date of birth: 5 November 1980 (age 45)
- Place of birth: Istanbul, Turkey
- Height: 1.87 m (6 ft 1 1/2 in)
- Position: Defensive midfielder

Youth career
- Gaziosmanpaşaspor

Senior career*
Years	Team	Apps	(Gls)
1999–2002	Gaziosmanpaşaspor	89	(16)
2002–2004	Mersin İdmanyurdu	59	(3)
2004–2006	Ankaraspor	49	(2)
2006–2007	Kayseri Erciyesspor	26	(2)
2007–2009	Bursaspor	56	(8)
2009–2011	Galatasaray	51	(4)
2011	Samsunspor	11	(1)
2011–2012	Karabükspor	12	(3)
2012–2013	Mersin İdmanyurdu	10	(0)
2013	Elazığspor	12	(0)
2013–2014	İstanbul BB	24	(6)
2014	Manisaspor	6	(0)

International career
2006	Turkey B	1	(0)
- * Club domestic league appearances and goals as of 15 September 2015

Mustafa Sarp (born November 5, 1980, in Bakırköy, Istanbul, Turkey) is a Turkish footballer who last played for Manisaspor as a midfielder.

== Career ==
On Tuesday, June 9, 2009, it was announced that he is a member of Galatasaray. Sarp has chosen number 16 as his club number.

He scored his first goal for Galatasaray at 23 July 2009, against Tobol.

On 2 September 2011 he mutually terminated the contract by waived the wage not yet paid to Sarp of US$400,000. He joined Samsunspor on free transfer.

== Career statistics ==
As of 30 June 2013

Club	Season	League		Cup		Europe		Total	
Club	Season	Apps	Goals	Apps	Goals	Apps	Goals	Apps	Goals
Gaziosmanpaşaspor	1999–00	28	6	1	0	-		29	6
Gaziosmanpaşaspor	2000–01	31	1	2	0	-		33	1
Gaziosmanpaşaspor	2001–02	30	9	1	0	-		31	9
Gaziosmanpaşaspor	Total	89	16	4	0	0	0	93	16
Mersin İdmanyurdu	2002–03	31	2	0	0	-		31	2
Mersin İdmanyurdu	2003–04	28	1	2	1	-		30	2
Mersin İdmanyurdu	Total	59	3	2	1	0	0	61	4
Ankaraspor	2004–05	25	0	0	0	-		25	0
Ankaraspor	2005–06	24	2	1	0	-		25	2
Ankaraspor	Total	49	2	1	0	0	0	50	2
Kayseri Erciyesspor	2006–07	26	2	10	0	-		36	2
Kayseri Erciyesspor	Total	26	2	10	0	0	0	36	2
Bursaspor	2007–08	29	4	3	0	-		32	4
Bursaspor	2008–09	27	4	5	0	-		32	4
Bursaspor	Total	56	8	8	0	0	0	64	8
Galatasaray	2009–10	30	3	6	0	13	2	49	5
Galatasaray	2010–11	17	1	1	0	2	1	20	2
Galatasaray	Total	47	4	6	0	15	3	69	7
Samsunspor	2011–12	11	1	0	0	-		11	1
Samsunspor	Total	11	1	0	0	0	0	11	1
Karabükspor	2011–12	12	3	5	1	-		17	4
Karabükspor	Total	12	3	5	1	0	0	17	4
Mersin İdmanyurdu	2012–13	10	0	2	0	-		12	0
Mersin İdmanyurdu	Total	10	0	2	0	0	0	12	0
Elazığspor	2012–13	12	0	0	0	-		12	0
Elazığspor	Total	12	0	0	0	0	0	12	0
Career total		371	39	38	2	15	3	425	44
