= Yasir Elmacı =

Turkish footballer

Personal information
- Date of birth: October 10, 1981 (age 45)
- Place of birth: Konya, Turkey
- Height: 1.81 m (5 ft 11 in)
- Positions: Defensive midfielder; midfielder

Team information
- Current team: Şanlıurfaspor
- Number: 15

Youth career
- –1998: Dardanelspor

Senior career*
Years	Team	Apps	(Gls)
1998–2002	Dardanelspor	32	(1)
2000–2001	→ Aliağa A.Ş. (loan)	0	(0)
2002–2003	Erzurumspor	10	(0)
2003	Altay	2	(0)
2003–2004	Zonguldakspor	0	(0)
2004	Yimpas Yozgatspor	28	(5)
2005–2008	Sivasspor	77	(2)
2008–2010	Gençlerbirliği	2	(0)
2009–2010	→ Kasımpaşa (loan)	7	(0)
2010–2011	Altay	8	(0)
2011–2012	Pendikspor	17	(0)
2012	Şanlıurfaspor	0	(0)

International career
1999	Turkey U-17	1	(0)
- * Club domestic league appearances and goals

Yasir Elmacı (born 10 October 1981 in Konya, Turkey) is a Turkish retired footballer.
