= Kanfory Sylla =

Guinean footballer

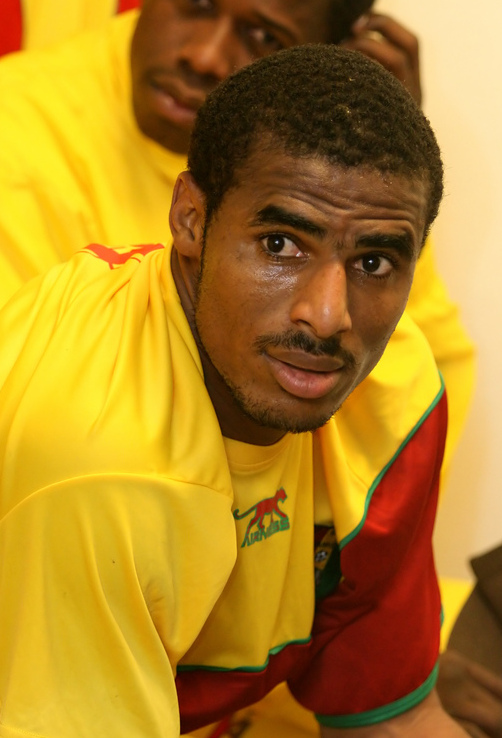

Personal information
- Full name: Kanfory Sylla
- Date of birth: 7 July 1980 (age 46)
- Place of birth: Conakry, Guinea
- Height: 1.82 m (6 ft 0 in)
- Positions: Defender; midfielder

Team information
- Current team: Zakho

Senior career*
Years	Team	Apps	(Gls)
2001	Étoile de Guinée		
2001–2004	Charleroi	66	(0)
2004–2006	Ethnikos	54	(3)
2006–2007	Kallithea	25	(0)
2007–2009	Sivasspor	49	(8)
2009–2010	İstanbul BB	19	(4)
2010	Konyaspor	1	(0)
2012	EGS Gafsa	10	(0)
2013	AS Kaloum		
2013–	Zakho		

International career^{‡}
2004–2009	Guinea	38	(0)
- * Club domestic league appearances and goals as of 6 April 2013 ‡ National team caps and goals as of 25 May 2010

Kanfory Sylla (born 7 July 1980 in Conakry) is a Guinean football defensive all-arounder who currently plays for Zakho FC in the Iraqi Premier League. He played for Sivasspor, İstanbul BB and Konyaspor in Turkey's Super League.

== International football ==
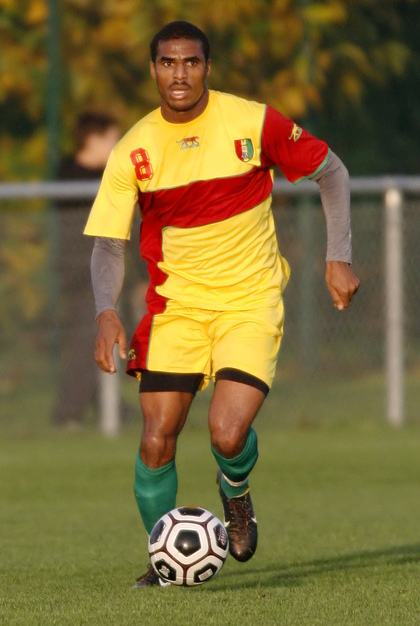
Sylla while playing in friendly match of Guinea national team (2006)

Sylla was part of the Guinea National Teams that competed at the Africa Cup of Nations in 2004, 2006 and 2008.
