= Bülent Kocabey =

Turkish footballer

Personal information
- Date of birth: June 8, 1984 (age 42)
- Place of birth: Istanbul, Turkey
- Height: 1.72 m (5 ft 8 in)
- Position: Midfielder

Team information
- Current team: Edirnespor

Youth career
- 1999–2003: Beşiktaş

Senior career*
Years	Team	Apps	(Gls)
2003–2006	Gençlerbirliği	0	(0)
2004–2006	→ Hacettepespor (loan)	44	(9)
2006–2008	Hacettepespor	58	(9)
2008–2010	Eskişehirspor	46	(5)
2010–2011	Karabükspor	13	(1)
2011–2012	Samsunspor	8	(0)
2012	Karşıyaka	14	(0)
2012–2013	Adanaspor	18	(0)
2014	Denizlispor	2	(0)
2014–2015	Çubukspor	23	(2)
2015	İnegölspor	16	(2)
2016–2018	Bayrampaşa	78	(15)
2018–2020	Sultanbeyli Belediyespor	54	(11)
2020–	Edirnespor	0	(0)
- * Club domestic league appearances and goals as of 18 March 2020

Bülent Kocabey (born June 8, 1984 in Istanbul, Turkey), is a Turkish footballer who plays as a midfielder for Edirnespor.
