= Alon Weisberg =

Israeli professional footballer (born 1989)

Alon Weisberg אלון ויסברג
Personal information
- Full name: Alon Weisberg
- Date of birth: April 26, 1989 (age 37)
- Place of birth: Ukrainian SSR
- Position: Striker

Youth career
- –2005: Hapoel Be'er Sheva
- 2005–2009: Maccabi Netanya

Senior career*
Years	Team	Apps	(Gls)
2006–2011	Maccabi Netanya	2	(0)
2009	→ Hakoah Ramat Gan (loan)	1	(0)
2010	→ Maccabi Ironi Bat Yam (loan)	2	(0)
2010	→ Maccabi Ironi Kfar Yona (loan)	10	(1)
2010–2011	→ Hapoel Herzliya (loan)	12	(2)
2011–2012	Krymteplytsia Molodizhne	2	(0)
2013–2014	Hapoel Katamon Jerusalem	9	(0)
2014–2015	Maccabi Kabilio Jaffa	8	(0)

International career
2007	Israel U18	2	(0)
- * Club domestic league appearances and goals as of 26 August 2014

Alon Weisberg (Hebrew: אלון ויסברג; born 26 April 1989) is an Israeli professional footballer.

== Playing career ==
Born in the Ukrainian SSR, Weisberg moved to Israel when he was 6 months old. He grew up in the Hapoel Be'er Sheva youth ranks and in 2005 he moved to Maccabi Netanya. On 2 January 2007 he made his debut for Netanya's senior side in a Toto Cup game against Maccabi Tel Aviv, where he scored 2 goals.

Weisberg struggled to get a spot in Netanya and got loaned to Hakoah Ramat Gan, Maccabi Ironi Bat Yam, Maccabi Ironi Kfar Yona and Hapoel Herzliya from the Liga Leumit.

In July 2011 he left Israel for the Ukrainian First League when he signed a two years contract with FC Krymteplytsia Molodizhne worth approximately €100,000.

In August 2012 he trained with FC Vorskla Poltava and was injured and missed the 2012–2013 season due to injury.

In December 2013 he signed with Hapoel Katamon Jerusalem in the Liga Leumit. The next season, he signed a year deal with Maccabi Kabilio Jaffa in Liga Alef.

== Club career statistics ==
(correct as of January 2014)

Club	Season	League			Cup			Toto Cup			Europe			Total		
Club	Season	Apps	Goals	Assists	Apps	Goals	Assists	Apps	Goals	Assists	Apps	Goals	Assists	Apps	Goals	Assists
Maccabi Netanya	2006–07	0	0	0	0	0	0	2	2	0	0	0	0	2	2	0
Maccabi Netanya	2007–08	1	0	0	0	0	0	2	0	0	0	0	0	3	0	0
Maccabi Netanya	2008–09	0	0	0	0	0	0	0	0	0	0	0	0	0	0	0
Hakoah Amidar Ramat Gan (loan)	2008–09	2	0	0	1	0	0	0	0	0	0	0	0	3	0	0
Maccabi Netanya	2009–10	1	0	0	0	0	0	6	1	0	2	0	0	9	1	0
Maccabi Ironi Bat Yam (loan)	2009–10	2	0	0	0	0	0	0	0	0	0	0	0	2	0	0
Maccabi Ironi Kfar Yona (loan)	2009–10	10	1	1	0	0	0	0	0	0	0	0	0	10	1	1
Hapoel Herzliya (loan)	2010–11	12	2	1	0	0	0	2	0	0	0	0	0	14	2	1
FC Krymteplytsia Molodizhne	2011–12	2	0	0	0	0	0	0	0	0	0	0	0	2	0	0
Hapoel Katamon Jerusalem	2013-14	9	0	0	1	0	0	0	0	0	0	0	0	10	0	0
Maccabi Kabilio Jaffa	2014-15	8	0	0	1	0	0	0	0	0	0	0	0	9	0	0
Career		47	3	2	3	0	0	12	3	0	2	0	0	64	6	2
