= Hasan Ali Durtuluk =

Turkish football midfielder

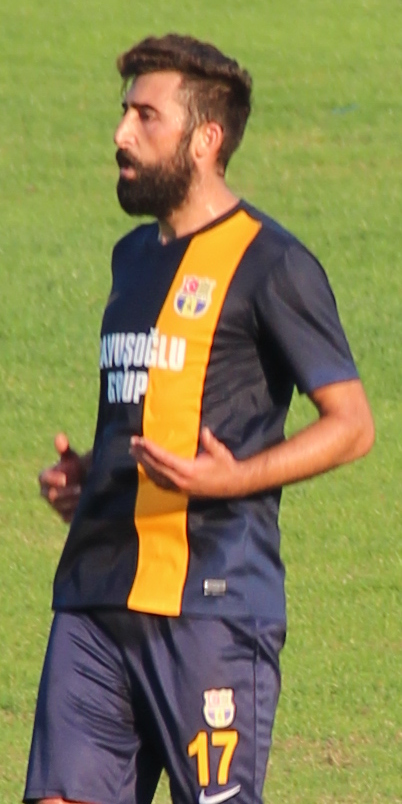

Personal information
- Date of birth: January 1, 1989 (age 37)
- Place of birth: Bozkır, Turkey
- Height: 1.77 m (5 ft 9 1/2 in)
- Positions: Forward; wing

Team information
- Current team: Derincespor
- Number: 17

Senior career*
Years	Team	Apps	(Gls)
2008–2012	Istanbul BB	18	(3)
2008–2009	→ Oyak Renault (loan)		
2011	→ Tavşanlı Linyitspor (loan)	11	(1)
2011	→ Körfez FK (loan)	6	(2)
2012	Bugsaşspor	12	(4)
2012–2014	Manisaspor	38	(3)
2014	Göztepe	6	(0)
2014	Tepecikspor	2	(0)
2015	Konya Şeker	9	(0)
2015	Eyüpspor	4	(0)
2016–	Derincespor	13	(2)

International career
2007	Turkey U19	2	(0)
- * Club domestic league appearances and goals as of 26 December 2016

Hasan Ali Durtuluk (born January 1, 1989) is a Turkish football midfielder who plays for Derincespor.
