= Ahmet Burak Solakel =

Turkish footballer

Personal information
- Date of birth: 1 March 1982 (age 44)
- Place of birth: İzmir, Turkey
- Height: 1.74 m (5 ft 8 1/2 in)
- Position: Left back

Youth career
- 1999–2002: Bucaspor
- 2002–2005: Gaziantep BB

Senior career*
Years	Team	Apps	(Gls)
2005–2006	Gaziantepspor	10	(0)
2006–2008	Mardinspor	1	(0)
2008–2009	Karşıyaka	31	(0)
2009–2011	Denizlispor	45	(0)
2011–2013	Karşıyaka	46	(0)
2013	Denizlispor	15	(0)
2013–2015	Samsunspor	44	(1)
2015–2016	Adana Demirspor	24	(1)
2016	Yeni Malatyaspor	13	(0)
2017–2018	Samsunspor	26	(0)
2018–2019	Fethiyespor	2	(0)
2019–2020	Elazığspor	19	(0)
2021–2022	Viven Bornova FK		
- * Club domestic league appearances and goals as of 19 January 2020

Ahmet Burak Solakel (born 1 March 1982) is a Turkish former footballer who played as a defender.

== Career ==
=== Elazığspor ===
On the final day of the January transfer market 2019, Solakel was one of 22 players, who within two hours, signed up to play for the Turkish club Elazığspor. The club had been placed under a transfer embargo but successfully managed to negotiate it with the Turkish FA, leading to them going on a mad spree of signing and registering a load of players despite not even having a permanent manager in place. In just two hours, they managed to snap up a record 22 players - 12 coming in on permanent contracts and a further 10 joining on loan deals until the end of the season.
