= Sezgin Coşkun =

Turkish footballer

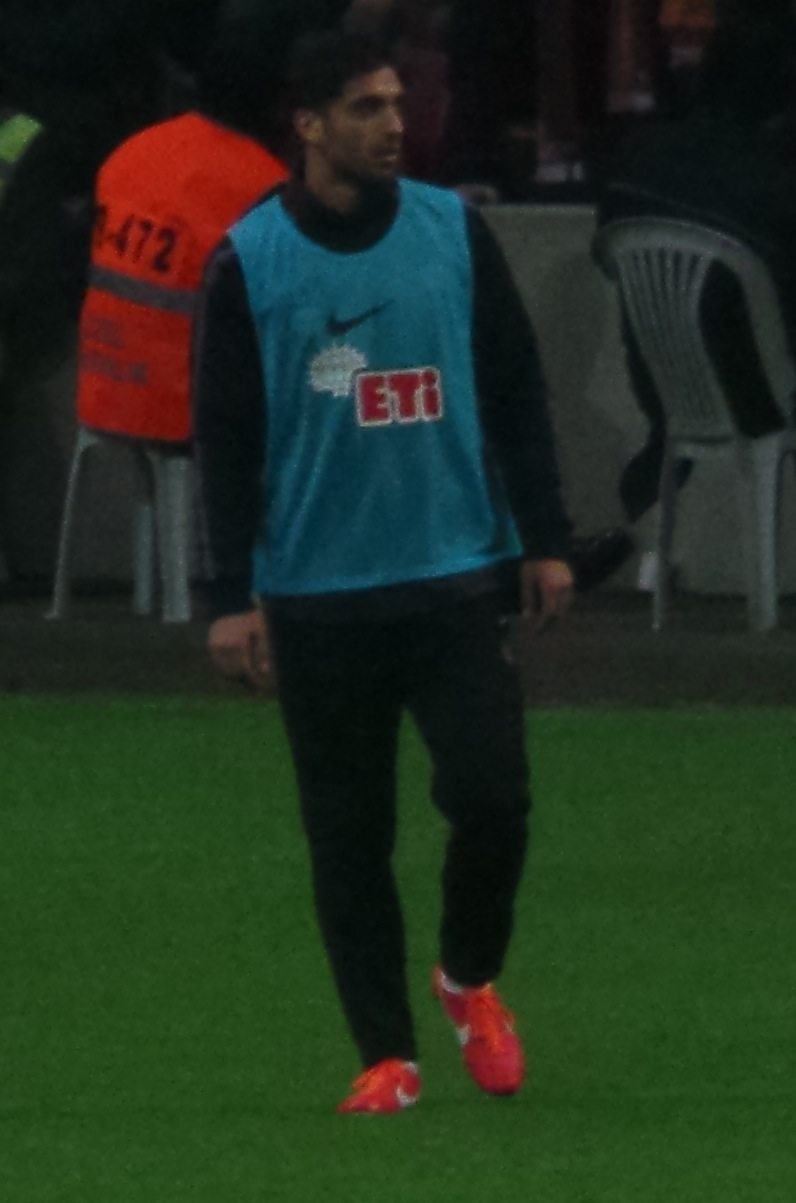

Personal information
- Date of birth: 23 August 1984 (age 42)
- Place of birth: Ardahan, Turkey
- Height: 1.85 m (6 ft 1 in)
- Positions: Centre back; right back

Youth career
- 1998–2002: Çerkezköyspor

Senior career*
| Years | Team | Apps | (Gls) |
| 2002–2004 | Çorluspor | 20 | (1) |
| 2004–2006 | Eyüpspor | 32 | (0) |
| 2006–2007 | Gaziantep B.B. | 35 | (1) |
| 2007–2016 | Eskişehirspor | 187 | (6) |
| 2016–2017 | Ankaragücü | 25 | (0) |
| 2017–2018 | Elazığspor | 23 | (1) |
| 2018–2022 | Eskişehirspor | 51 | (3) |
- * Club domestic league appearances and goals

Sezgin Coşkun (born 23 August 1984) is a Turkish former footballer who played as a right back or centre back.
