= Kamel Zaiem =

Tunisian footballer (born 1983)

Personal information
- Date of birth: 25 May 1983 (age 43)
- Place of birth: Ras Jebel, Tunisia
- Height: 1.75 m (5 ft 9 in)
- Position: Attacking midfielder

Team information
- Current team: Al-Hazem (assistant)

Youth career
- 2001–2003: AS Ariana

Senior career*
Years	Team	Apps	(Gls)
2001–2003	AS Ariana		
2003–2008	Espérance	63	(14)
2008	Partizan	6	(0)
2009	Al-Khor SC	8	(0)
2009–2011	Sfaxien	27	(5)
2011–2012	ENPPI	2	(0)
2012–2015	CA Bizertin	34	(2)

International career
2006–2013	Tunisia	14	(2)

Managerial career
- 2020–2021: Al-Kawkab
- 2021: US Ben Guerdane
- 2025–: Al-Hazem (assistant)
- * Club domestic league appearances and goals

Kamel Zaiem (born 25 May 1983) is a Tunisian football manager and former player who played as a midfielder, who is the currently assistant coach of Saudi Pro League club Al-Hazem.

== Club career ==
Zaiem started his career by playing with his home town club AS Ariana where he became professional in 2001. After two seasons playing with Ariana in the Tunisian second league, in 2003 he signed with one of the most popular Tunisian clubs, the Espérance Sportive de Tunis. Brough as a prospective young player Zaiem will play with Espérance five seasons and becoming an important club player. Until 2008, he won with Espérance two national championships and three cups.

By 2008 he had become a national team player, and after five seasons and a number of titles won with Espérance he decided to move abroad, signing with Serbian club FK Partizan. However tough competition in the midfield made Zaiem lack much chances to play, and he ended up leaving in the winter break after playing six matches in the Serbian SuperLiga in six months, but not without collecting the "double" won by the club that season.

In early 2009 he decided to move to Arab football, joining Al-Khor Sports Club playing in the Qatar Stars League, but in next summer Zaiem will return to Tunisia and wear the shirt number 10 with Club Sportif Sfaxien. During his two-year spell with Sfaxien, he played the 2010 CAF Confederation Cup final where they lost against FUS Rabat, a 3–2 in aggregate. After the first match having finished with a 0–0 tie, in the second match while the match was tie 1–1 in the start of the second half Zaiem gave the lead to Sfaxien by scoring a penalty in the 49 minute however the Moroccan club scored two more goals in the second half making the final score of 2–3.

In summer 2011 Zaiem signed with Egyptian top league club ENPPI.

In the summer 2012 Zaiem signed with Tunisian league club CA Bizertin on a two-year contract. He retired in winter 2015.

== International career ==
Zaiem played his first match for the Tunisian national team in 2006. Within the two last seasons with Espérance he had started receiving regularly calls, and he was selected for the Tunisian team at the 2008 Africa Cup of Nations. By 2013 he has played 14 matches for Tunisia, having scored twice.

== Managerial career ==
On 22 September 2020, Zaiem was appointed as head coach of Saudi Arabian club Al-Kawkab. On 8 December 2020, Zaiem was sacked after 9 rounds.

== Honours ==
Espérance

- Tunisian Ligue Professionnelle 1: 2003–04, 2005–06
- Tunisian Cup: 2006, 2007, 2008

Partizan

- Serbian SuperLiga: 2008–09
- Serbian Cup: 2008–09

Sfaxien

- CAF Confederation Cup runner-up: 2010

Bizertin

- Tunisian Cup: 2013
