= 2010 CAF Confederation Cup =

International football competition in Africa

Confederation of African Football Confederation Cup

Tournament details
- Dates: February 2010 – November
- Teams: 52

Final positions
- Champions: (Morocco) FUS Rabat (1st title)
- Runners-up: (Tunisia) CS Sfaxien

Tournament statistics
- Matches played: 116
- Goals scored: 297 (2.56 per match)
- Top scorer: (Egypt) Ahmed Abdel-Ghani (7 goals)

The 2010 CAF Confederation Cup was the 7th edition of the CAF Confederation Cup, Africa's secondary club football competition organized by the Confederation of African Football (CAF). The winners played in the 2011 CAF Super Cup.

== Schedule ==
Round	1st leg	2nd leg
Preliminary round	12–14 February	26–28 February
First round	19–21 March	2–4 April
Second round (1st Round of 16)	23–25 April	7–9 May
Play-off for group stage (2nd Round of 16)	16–18 July	30 July–1 August
Group stage	13–15 August; 27–29 August; 10–12 September; 17–19 September; 1–3 October; 15–17 October	
Semifinals	29–31 October	12–14 November
Final	26–28 November	3–5 December

== Qualifying rounds ==
=== Preliminary round ===
Team 1	Agg.	Team 2	1st leg	2nd leg
CAPS United (Zimbabwe)	1–1 (8–7 p)	(Eswatini) Mbabane Highlanders	1–0	0–1
Pamplemousses (Mauritius)	1–5	(South Africa) Moroka Swallows	1–2	0–3
Atlético Olympic F.C. (Burundi)	1–2	(Nigeria) Warri Wolves	1–1	0–1
Tersanah (Libya)	2–3	(Algeria) CR Belouizdad	1–1	1–2
ATRACO FC (Rwanda)	2–2 (9–10 p)	(Sudan) Al-Amal SC	2–0	0–2
Costa do Sol (Mozambique)	5–1	(Botswana) UF Santos	2–0	3–1
AS CotonTchad (Chad)	0–2	(Libya) Ahly Tripoli	0–0	0–2
Miembeni (Zanzibar)	2–4	(Egypt) Petrojet	2–2	0–2
Villa SC (Uganda)	w/o^{1}	(Sudan) Khartoum	—	—
Séwé Sport (Ivory Coast)	3–1	(Burkina Faso) USFA	2–1	1–0
Benfica (Guinea-Bissau)	2–3	(Guinea) Baraka	0–0	2–3
Diaraf (Senegal)	2–3	(Morocco) FUS Rabat	2–1	0–2
Central Parade (Sierra Leone)	0–4	(Mali) CO Bamako	0–0	0–4
Dragón (Equatorial Guinea)	2–7	(Republic of the Congo) AC Léopards	2–3	0–4
AFC Leopards (Kenya)	3–4	(Ethiopia) Banks	3–1	0–3
Lengthens (Zimbabwe)	2–1	(Madagascar) AS Adema	2–1	0–0
DC Motema Pembe (Democratic Republic of the Congo)	4–1	(Central African Republic) Anges de Fatima	3–0	1–1
ASFAN (Niger)	3–2	(Ivory Coast) Issia Wazi FC	2–0	1–2

Byes: Primeiro de Agosto (Angola), Coton Sport FC (Cameroon), Haras El Hodood (Egypt), FC 105 (Gabon), FAR Rabat (Morocco), Stade Malien (Mali), Enyimba (Nigeria), AS Vita Club (Congo DR), Simba (Tanzania), Étoile Sahel (Tunisia), CS Sfaxien (Tunisia), ZESCO United (Zambia), Académica do Soyo (Angola)^{2}, Panthère Sportive du Ndé FC (Cameroon) ^{3}.

^{1} SC Villa withdrew.
^{2} Académica do Soyo were drawn against the champions of São Tomé and Príncipe, but the São Toméan FA did not send a team.
^{3} Panthère du Ndé were drawn against the champions of Benin, but the Beninese FA did not send a team.

=== First round ===
Team 1	Agg.	Team 2	1st leg	2nd leg
CAPS United (Zimbabwe)	2–1	(South Africa) Moroka Swallows	1–1	1–0
Warri Wolves (Nigeria)	3–2	(Zambia) ZESCO United	3–0	0–2
CR Belouizdad (Algeria)	2–1	(Morocco) FAR Rabat	1–0	1–1
Al-Amal SC (Sudan)	6–5	(Mozambique) Costa do Sol	4–2	2–3
Ahly Tripoli (Libya)	0–1	(Tunisia) CS Sfaxien	0–0	0–1
Petrojet (Egypt)	5–1	(Sudan) Khartoum	3–0	2–1
Séwé Sport (Ivory Coast)	2–2 (3–4 p)	(Mali) Stade Malien	2–0	0–2
Baraka (Guinea)	0–1	(Morocco) FUS Rabat	0–0	0–1
Académica do Soyo (Angola)	2–3	(Nigeria) Enyimba	2–0	0–3
Panthère Sportive du Ndé FC (Cameroon)	3–4	(Democratic Republic of the Congo) AS Vita Club	1–1	2–3
CO Bamako (Mali)	0–3	(Angola) Primeiro de Agosto	0–0	0–3
AC Léopards (Republic of the Congo)	3–3 (a)	(Cameroon) Coton Sport FC	3–1	0–2
Banks (Ethiopia)	1–6	(Egypt) Haras El Hodood	1–1	0–5
Lengthens (Zimbabwe)	1–5	(Tanzania) Simba	0–3	1–2
DC Motema Pembe (Democratic Republic of the Congo)	1–0	(Gabon) FC 105	0–0	1–0
ASFAN (Niger)	2–2 (a)	(Tunisia) Étoile Sahel	1–0	1–2

=== Second round ===
Team 1	Agg.	Team 2	1st leg	2nd leg
Warri Wolves (Nigeria)	2–3	(Zimbabwe) CAPS United	2–1	0–2
Al-Amal SC (Sudan)	1–2	(Algeria) CR Belouizdad	1–0	0–2
Petrojet (Egypt)	1–2	(Tunisia) CS Sfaxien	1–1	0–1
FUS Rabat (Morocco)	2–0	(Mali) Stade Malien	2–0	0–0
AS Vita Club (Democratic Republic of the Congo)	3–3 (4–5 p)	(Nigeria) Enyimba	3–0	0–3
Coton Sport FC (Cameroon)	1–2	(Angola) Primeiro de Agosto	1–2	0–0
Simba (Tanzania)	3–6	(Egypt) Haras El Hodood	2–1	1–5
ASFAN (Niger)	1–0	(Democratic Republic of the Congo) DC Motema Pembe	1–0	0–0

The Winners advance to a play-off against the losers of the Second Round of the Champions League

=== Play-off round ===
Team 1	Agg.	Team 2	1st leg	2nd leg
Al-Ittihad Tripoli (Libya)	3–2	(Angola) Primeiro de Agosto	2–0	1–2
Al-Hilal (Sudan)	8–1	(Zimbabwe) CAPS United	5–0	3–1
Al-Merreikh (Sudan)	3–4	(Niger) ASFAN	2–2	1–2
Petro de Luanda (Angola)	1–3	(Tunisia) CS Sfaxien	0–0	1–3
Zanaco (Zambia)	4–2	(Nigeria) Enyimba	4–0	0–2
Gaborone United (Botswana)	2–8	(Egypt) Haras El Hodood	1–0	1–8
Supersport United (South Africa)	2–2 (a)	(Morocco) FUS Rabat	2–1	0–1
Djoliba (Mali)	1–1 (a)	(Algeria) CR Belouizdad	0–0	1–1

The Winners advanced to the Group Stage

== Group stage ==
Key to colours in group tables
Group winners and runners-up advanced to the Semi-finals

=== Group A ===
Team	Pld	W	D	L	GF	GA	GD	Pts	HIL	ITT	DAC	ASF
(Sudan) Al-Hilal	6	4	1	1	10	6	+4	13	—	2–0	2–1	4–2
(Libya) Ittihad	6	4	0	2	11	5	+6	12	1–2	—	2–0	4–0
(Mali) Djoliba	6	2	1	3	4	5	−1	7	2–0	0–1	—	1–0
(Niger) ASFAN	6	0	2	4	3	12	−9	2	0–0	1–3	0–0	—

Legend: Blue = home team win; Yellow = draw; Red = away team win.

=== Group B ===
Team	Pld	W	D	L	GF	GA	GD	Pts	FUS	CSS	ZAN	HEH
(Morocco) FUS Rabat	6	4	1	1	7	6	+1	13	—	2–1	1–0	1–0
(Tunisia) CS Sfaxien	6	3	1	2	9	5	+4	10	3–0	—	2–1	3–1
(Zambia) Zanaco	6	1	3	2	5	6	−1	6	1–1	1–0	—	1–1
(Egypt) Haras El Hodood	6	0	3	3	4	8	−4	3	1–2	0–0	1–1	—

Legend: Blue = home team win; Yellow = draw; Red = away team win.

== Knock-out stage ==
=== Bracket ===
Semi-Finals
1	(Libya) Al-Ittihad Tripoli	1	1	2
4	(Morocco) FUS Rabat (a)	2	0	2
3	(Tunisia) CS Sfaxien (p)	1	0	1 (5)
2	(Sudan) Al-Hilal	0	1	1 (3)

Final
(Morocco) FUS Rabat	0	3	3
(Tunisia) CS Sfaxien	0	2	2

=== Semifinals ===
Team 1	Agg.	Team 2	1st leg	2nd leg
Al-Ittihad Tripoli (Libya)	2–2 (a)	(Morocco) FUS Rabat	1–2	1–0
CS Sfaxien (Tunisia)	1–1 (5–3 p)	(Sudan) Al-Hilal	1–0	0–1

=== Final ===
28 November 2010
18:30 UTC±0

FUS Rabat (Morocco)	0 – 0	(Tunisia) CS Sfaxien
	Report

Complex Sportif Moulay Abdellah, Rabat
Referee: Mohamed Benouza (Algeria)
4 December 2010
18:00 UTC+1

CS Sfaxien (Tunisia)	2 – 3	(Morocco) FUS Rabat
Rouid 44'; Zaiem 49' (pen.)	Report	Boukhriss 7'; Rokki 75'; Zouidi 89'

Stade Taïeb Mhiri, Sfax
Referee: Jerome Damon (South Africa)

FUS Rabat won 3–2 on aggregate.

== Top goalscorers ==
The top scorers from the 2010 CAF Confederation Cup are as follows:

Rank	Name	Team	Goals
1	(Egypt) Ahmed Abdel-Ghani	(Egypt) Haras El Hodood	7
2	(Sudan) Al-Tahir Hamad	(Sudan) Al-Amal Atbara	5
2	(Zimbabwe) Edward Sadomba	(Sudan) Al-Hilal	5
2	(Tunisia) Hamza Younés	(Tunisia) CS Sfaxien	5

== See also ==
- 2010 CAF Champions League
- 2011 CAF Super Cup
