= Baraka Djoma SSG =

Guinean football club

Baraka Djoma
- Full name: Baraka Djoma Société Sportive et Géneral
- Founded: 1994
- Ground: Stade Municipal de Coléah; Conakry, Guinea
- Capacity: 1,000
- League: Guinean Second Division

Baraka Djoma SSG is a football club from Conakry, Guinea. They play in the Guinean Second Division, which is the second league in Guinean football.

In 2009 the team has won the Guinée Coupe Nationale.

== Stadium ==
Currently the team plays at the 1000 capacity Stade Municipal de Coléah.

== Achievements ==
=== National titles ===
- Guinée Coupe Nationale: 1

Winner: 2009

== Performance in CAF competitions ==
- CAF Confederation Cup: 1 appearance

2010 – Preliminary Round
