= 2010–11 MKE Ankaragücü season =

Ankaragücü
2010–11 season
- President: (Turkey) Ahmet Göçek
- Manager: (Turkey) Ümit Özat (Turkey) Mesut Bakkal
- Stadium: Ankara 19 Mayıs Stadium
- Süper Lig: 13th
- Turkish Cup: Group stage
Home colours	Away colours

The 2010–11 MKE Ankaragücü season was the 29th consecutive season for the club from Ankara in the Süper Lig.

== Current squad ==
As of 22 September 2010

Note: Flags indicate national team as defined under FIFA eligibility rules; some limited exceptions apply. Players may hold more than one non-FIFA nationality.

No.	Pos.	Nation	Player
1	GK	SVK	Štefan Senecký
3	DF	TUR	Uğur Uçar
4	MF	TUR	Muhammet Hanifi Yoldaş
5	DF	CAN	Michael Klukowski
6	MF	TUR	Kağan Söylemezgiller
7	FW	TUR	Turgut Doğan Şahin
8	MF	TUR	Mehmet Çakır
9	FW	SVK	Stanislav Sestak (on loan from VfL Bochum)
10	FW	TUR	Metin Akan
11	FW	SVK	Róbert Vittek
14	DF	POL	Michał Żewłakow
15	MF	LBR	Theo Weeks
17	MF	CZE	Jan Rajnoch

No.	Pos.	Nation	Player
18	MF	TUR	Murat Duruer
19	MF	TUR	Güven Varol
20	MF	TUR	Umut Sözen
21	FW	GAB	Roguy Méyé
22	GK	TUR	Bayram Olgun
25	DF	TUR	Aydın Toscalı
27	MF	SVK	Marek Sapara (Captain)
35	GK	TUR	Bora Körk
41	GK	TUR	Özden Öngün
50	MF	TUR	Hürriyet Güçer (Vice-captain)
60	MF	TUR	Özgür Çek
66	MF	TUR	Adem Koçak
99	MF	CRO	Drago Gabrić (on loan from Trabzonspor)

== Süper Lig ==
=== League table ===
Pos	Team	Pld	W	D	L	GF	GA	GD	Pts
11	Antalyaspor	34	10	12	12	41	48	−7	42 (Note: Antalyaspor were ahead of Sivasspor on head-to-head record: Antalyaspor–İstanbul B.B. 1–0, İstanbul B.B.–Antalyaspor 1–1.)
12	İstanbul B.B.	34	12	6	16	40	45	−5	42
13	MKE Ankaragücü	34	10	11	13	52	62	−10	41
14	Gençlerbirliği	34	10	10	14	43	51	−8	40
15	Sivasspor	34	8	11	15	43	57	−14	35

Source: tff.org (in Turkish)
Rules for classification: 1) points; 2) goal difference; 3) number of goals scored.

=== Results summary ===
Overall								Home						Away					
Pld	W	D	L	GF	GA	GD	Pts	W	D	L	GF	GA	GD	W	D	L	GF	GA	GD
34	10	11	13	52	62	−10	41	6	5	6	30	32	−2	4	6	7	22	30	−8

Source: Competitive Matches

=== Results by round ===
Round	1	2	3	4	5	6	7	8	9	10	11	12	13	14	15	16	17	18	19	20	21	22	23	24	25	26	27	28	29	30	31	32	33	34
Ground	H	A	H	A	H	A	H	A	H	A	H	A	H	A	H	H	A	A	H	A	H	A	H	A	H	A	H	A	H	A	H	A	A	H
Result	L	W	D	L	W	L	W	W	L	D	L	D	D	L	D	W	D	D	L	L	W	L	L	W	W	D	D	L	W	W	D	D	L	L
Position	17	6	7	13	10	11	9	8	8	10	11	11	11	11	12	11	13	13	13	13	12	12	13	12	12	12	11	13	12	10	9	8	11	13

Source: Competitive Matches
W = Win; D = Draw; L = Loss

=== Matches ===
==== First half ====
15 August 2010 1	Ankaragücü	0–2	Trabzonspor	Ankara
19:30 EET	Aydın Toscalı (yellow card) 60'	Report	(yellow card) 17' Ceyhun Gülselam; (yellow card) 42' Egemen Korkmaz; 70', 83' Teófilo Gutiérrez; (yellow card) 79' Gustavo Colman; (yellow card) 80' Serkan Balcı	Stadium: Ankara 19 Mayıs Stadium; Referee: Cüneyt Çakır

22 August 2010 2	Manisaspor	0–3	Ankaragücü	Manisa
22:00 EET	Yiğit İncedemir (yellow card) 68'	Report	19' (yellow card) 87' Stanislav Šesták; (yellow card) 32' Marek Sapara; (yellow card) 43' Aydın Toscalı; 57' Özgür Çek; 65' Güven Varol	Stadium: Manisa 19 Mayıs Stadium; Referee: Suat Arslanboğa

27 August 2010 3	Ankaragücü	1–1	Kayserispor	Ankara
20:00 EET	Aydin Toscali (yellow card) 28'; Mehmet Çakır 58'; Marek Sapara (yellow card) 89'	Report	24' (yellow card) 44' Serdar Kesimal	Stadium: Ankara 19 Mayıs Stadium; Referee: Süleyman Abay

11 September 2010 4	Beşiktaş	4–0	Ankaragücü	Istanbul
21:30 EET	Bobô 29', 67'; İsmail Köybaşı (yellow card) 48'; İbrahim Toraman 61'; Mert Nobre 75'	Report	(yellow card) 18' Uğur Uçar; (yellow card) 57' Jan Rajnoch	Stadium: BJK İnönü Stadium; Referee: Mustafa Kâmil Abitoğlu

18 September 2010 5	Ankaragücü	3–0	Kasımpaşa	Ankara
15:30 EET	Metin Akan 45'; Güven Varol (yellow card) 53'; Marek Sapara 56'; Luiz Henrique 67' (o.g.)	Report	(yellow card) 20' Razundara Tjikuzu; (yellow card) 36' Fernando Varela; (red card) 56' Gustave Bebbe; (red card) 80' Sancak Kaplan	Stadium: Ankara 19 Mayıs Stadium; Referee: Tolga Özkalfa

25 September 2010 6	Gençlerbirliği	1–0	Ankaragücü	Ankara
15:30 EET	Shane Smeltz 44'; Özkan Karabulut (yellow card) 74'; Aykut Demir (yellow card) 89'	Report	(yellow card) 18' Roguy Méyé; (yellow card) 44' Muhammet Hanifi Yoldaş; (yellow card) 89' Stanislav Šesták	Stadium: Ankara 19 Mayıs Stadium; Referee: Süleyman Abay

2 October 2010 7	Ankaragücü	4–1	Konyaspor	Ankara
19:00 EET	Metin Akan 44'; Jan Rajnoch 64'; Özgür Çek 67'; Murat Duruer (yellow card) 89'; Stanislav Šesták 90'	Report	27' (pen.) (yellow card) 37' Peter Grajciar; (yellow card) 39' Erdinç Yavuz; (yellow card) 59' Emrah Eren	Stadium: Ankara 19 Mayıs Stadium; Referee: İlker Meral

17 October 2010 8	Galatasaray	2–4	Ankaragücü	Istanbul
19:00 EET	Milan Baroš 57', 64'; Ufuk Ceylan (red card) 60'; Mustafa Sarp (yellow card) 80'; Ayhan Akman (yellow card) 81'; Hakan Balta (yellow card) 88'	Report	3' Metin Akan; 51' Özgür Çek; 60' Stanislav Šesták; (yellow card) 72' Michael Klukowski; 89' Turgut Doğan Şahin	Stadium: Ali Sami Yen Stadium; Referee: Tolga Özkalfa

24 October 2010 9	Ankaragücü	1–5	Bursaspor	Ankara
14:30 EET	Stanislav Šesták 6' (yellow card) 81'	Report	İbrahim Öztürk 16'; Turgay Bahadır 27'; Ömer Erdoğan 31'; Pablo Batalla (yellow card) 38'; Ivan Ergić 39'; Volkan Şen (yellow card) 44'; Sercan Yıldırım 45'; Mustafa Keçeli (yellow card) 45'	Stadium: Ankara 19 Mayıs Stadium; Referee: Hüseyin Göçek

30 October 2010 10	Eskişehirspor	0–0	Ankaragücü	Eskişehir
15:30 EET	Sezgin Coşkun (yellow card) 85'	Report		Stadium: Eskişehir Atatürk Stadium; Referee: Halis Özkahya

6 November 2010 11	Ankaragücü	0–2	Gaziantepspor	Ankara
17:00 EET	Uğur Uçar (yellow card) 55'; Marek Sapara (yellow card) 88'	Report	65' Olcan Adın; (yellow card) 88' Ivelin Popov; 66' Ivan	Stadium: Ankara 19 Mayıs Stadium; Referee: Yunus Yıldırım

13 November 2010 12	Bucaspor	0–0	Ankaragücü	İzmir
14:30 EET	Landry Mulemo (yellow card) 35'; Sercan Kaya (yellow card) 87'	Report	(yellow card) 67' Stanislav Šesták; (yellow card) 75' Jan Rajnoch	Stadium: İzmir Alsancak Stadium; Referee: Ayketin Durmaz

21 November 2010 13	Ankaragücü	2–2	İstanbul B.B.	Ankara
17:00 EET	Aydın Toscalı 50'; Turgut Doğan Şahin 54'	Report	62' İbrahim Akın; 64' Hervé Tum	Stadium: Ankara 19 Mayıs Stadium; Referee: Özgür Yankaya

28 November 2010 14	Kardemir Karabükspor	5–1	Ankaragücü	Karabük
13:30 EET	Tozo (yellow card) 7'; Emmanuel Emenike 26', 74'; İlhan Parlak 51'; Yasin Avcı (yellow card) 52'; Birol Hikmet 58', 86'; Mehmet Çoğum (yellow card) 52'	Report	(yellow card) 44' Michał Żewłakow; (yellow card) 57' Uğur Uçar; (yellow card) 59' Marek Sapara	Stadium: Dr. Necmettin Şeyhoğlu Stadium; Referee: Serkan Çınar

4 December 2010 15	Ankaragücü	1–1	Sivasspor	Ankara
17:00 EET	Michael Klukowski 10'; Marek Sapara (yellow card) 46'; Stanislav Šesták (yellow card) 83'	Report	56' Erman Kılıç; (yellow card) 73' Mehmet Nas; (yellow card) 80' Ceyhun Eriş; (yellow card) 89' Mamadou Alimou Diallo	Stadium: Ankara 19 Mayıs Stadium; Referee: Tolga Özkalfa

12 December 2010 16	Ankaragücü	2–1	Fenerbahçe	Ankara
19:00 EET	Stanislav Šesták 62', 74'	Report	(yellow card) 83' Emre Belözoğlu; 90+3' Mamadou Niang	Stadium: Ankara 19 Mayıs Stadium; Referee: Kuddusi Müftüoğlu

18 December 2010 17	Antalyaspor	2–2	Ankaragücü	Antalya
17:00 EET	Erkan Sekman (yellow card) 40'; Necati Ateş 41', 81'	Report	(yellow card) 17' (goal) 71' Marek Sapara; 67' Michał Żewłakow	Stadium: Mardan Sports Complex; Referee: Hüseyin Göçek

==== Second half ====
22 January 2011 18	Trabzonspor	1–1	Ankaragücü	Trabzon
16:00 EET	Jajá 20'; Giray Kaçar (yellow card) 26'; Arkadiusz Głowacki (yellow card) 82'; Umut Bulut (yellow card) 84'	Report	(yellow card) 40' Güven Varol; 61' Drago Gabrić	Stadium: Hüseyin Avni Aker Stadium; Referee: Halis Özkahya

30 January 2011 19	Ankaragücü	1–3	Manisaspor	Ankara
14:00 EET	Stanislav Šesták (yellow card) 39'; Metin Akan 41'; Drago Gabrić (yellow card) 66'	Report	26' Kahê; (yellow card) 31' Yiğit İncedemir; (yellow card) 66' Bülent Cevahir; 87' 89' Mehmet Güven; (yellow card) 89' Josh Simpson	Stadium: Ankara 19 Mayıs Stadium; Referee: Abdullah Yılmaz

5 February 2011 20	Kayserispor	2–1	Ankaragücü	Kayseri
17:00 EET	Jonathan Santana (yellow card) 41'; Emir Kujović 70'; Serdar Kesimal (yellow card) 89'; Marcelo Zalayeta 90+5'	Report	(yellow card) 15' (goal) 38' Murat Duruer; (yellow card) 41' Michael Klukowski; (yellow card) 66' (yellow-red card) 89' Uğur Uçar; (yellow card) 89' Metin Akan; (yellow card) ME' Serdar Özkan	Stadium: Kadir Has Stadium; Referee: Koray Gençerler

13 February 2011 21	Ankaragücü	1–0	Beşiktaş	Ankara
19:00 EET	Serdar Özkan 1'; Marek Sapara (yellow card) 63'	Report	(yellow card) 87' İsmail Köybaşı	Stadium: Ankara 19 Mayıs Stadium; Referee: Özgür Yankaya

19 February 2011 22	Kasımpaşa	2–1	Ankaragücü	Istanbul
14:00 EET	Özgür Öçal (yellow card) 30'; Georgi Sarmov (yellow card) 58'; Ersen Martin (yellow card) 60'; Christian Keller (yellow card) 62'; Juan Robledo 66'; Halil Çolak 72'; Fernando Varela (yellow card) 74'	Report	(yellow card) 69' Drago Gabrić; (yellow card) 74' Serdar Özkan; 82' (pen.) (yellow card) 89' Fatih Tekke; (yellow card) 88' Murat Duruer	Stadium: Recep Tayyip Erdoğan Stadium; Referee: Tolga Özkalfa

26 February 2011 23	Ankaragücü	2–4	Gençlerbirliği	Ankara
14:00 EET	Metin Akan 67'; Orhan Şam 75' (o.g.)	Report	(yellow card) 29' Joachim Mununga; (yellow card) 40' Hurşut Meriç; 47' Oktay Delibalta; 59' Mustafa Pektemek; 78' Orhan Şam; (yellow card) 85' Serkan Çalık; (yellow card) 88' Yasin Öztekin	Stadium: Ankara 19 Mayıs Stadium; Referee: Aytekin Durmaz

5 March 2011 24	Konyaspor	0–2	Ankaragücü	Konya
15:00 EET	Peter Grajciar (yellow card) 43'; Mahamoudou Kéré (yellow card) 58'; Adnan Güngör (yellow card) 66'	Report	2', 31' (yellow card) 19' Drago Gabrić; (yellow card) 88' Özgür Çek	Stadium: Konya Atatürk Stadium; Referee: Yunus Yıldırım

13 March 2011 25	Ankaragücü	3–2	Galatasaray	Ankara
15:00 EET	Adem Koçak (yellow card) 33'; Stanislav Šesták 52', 86', 88'; Uğur Uçar (yellow card) 83'	Report	32' Aydın Yılmaz; (yellow card) 44' Lorik Cana; 62' Juan Pablo Pino; (yellow card) 74' Çağlar Birinci; (yellow card) 89' Ayhan Akman	Stadium: Ankara 19 Mayıs Stadium; Referee: Halis Özkahya

21 March 2011 26	Bursaspor	0–0	Ankaragücü	Bursa
20:00 EET	Ömer Erdoğan (yellow card) 10'; Mustafa Keçeli (yellow card) 40'	Report	(yellow card) 10' Roman Bednar; (yellow card) 39' Drago Gabrić; (yellow card) 72' Özgür Çek; (yellow card) 78' Robert Vittek; (yellow card) 89' Turgut Doğan Şahin	Stadium: Bursa Atatürk Stadium; Referee: Süleyman Abay

2 April 2011 27	Ankaragücü	2–2	Eskişehirspor	Ankara
17:00 EET	Michał Żewłakow (yellow card) 10'; Fatih Tekke 44'; Mehmet Çoğum (yellow card) 65'; Serdar Özkan 74'	Report	35' Burhan Eşer; (yellow card) 54' Sezer Öztürk; 69' (yellow card) 70' Batuhan Karadeniz	Stadium: Ankara 19 Mayıs Stadium; Referee: Tolga Özkalfa

10 April 2011 28	Gaziantepspor	3–2	Ankaragücü	Gaziantep
14:00 EET	Elyasa Süme (yellow card) 27'; Olcan Adın (yellow card) 35' (goal) 58'; Cenk Tosun 60', 75'; Şenol Can (yellow card) 67'; Murat Ceylan (yellow card) 71'	Report	(yellow card) 55' Serdar Özkan; 65' Jan Rajnoch; 87' Özgür Çek	Stadium: Gaziantep Kamil Ocak Stadium; Referee: Suat Arslanboğa

16 April 2011 29	Ankaragücü	5–3	Bucaspor	Ankara
14:00 EET	Murat Duruer 18', 51'; Aydin Toscali (yellow card) 44'; Robert Vittek 56' (pen.) (yellow card) 88'; Jan Rajnoch (yellow card) 66'; Metin Akan 86'; Özgür Çek 89'	Report	30' Torric Jebrin; (yellow card) 42' (goal) 44' Erkan Taşkıran; 59' Ediz Bahtiyaroğlu	Stadium: Ankara 19 Mayıs Stadium; Referee: Cüneyt Çakır

24 April 2011 30	İstanbul B.B.	1–4	Ankaragücü	Istanbul
17:00 EET	Metin Depe 50' (yellow card) 52'; Efe İnanç (yellow card) 59'; Gökhan Ünal (yellow card) 78'; Zeki Korkmaz (yellow card) 88'		3' Ümit Kurt; 14' Turgut Doğan Şahin; 52' Fatih Tekke; 69' Drago Gabrić	Stadium: Atatürk Olympic Stadium; Referee: Ayketin Durmaz

2 May 2011 31	Ankaragücü	0–0	Kardemir Karabükspor	Ankara
20:00 EET	Drago Gabrić (yellow card) 68'	Report	(yellow card) 90+1' Hocine Ragued	Stadium: Ankara 19 Mayıs Stadium; Referee: Serkan Çınar

8 May 2011 32	Sivasspor	1–1	Ankaragücü	Sivas
20:00 EET	Sedat Bayrak 73'	Report	60' Stanislav Šesták	Stadium: Sivas 4 Eylül Stadium; Referee: Mustafa Kâmil Abitoğlu

15 May 2011 33	Fenerbahçe	6–0	Ankaragücü	Istanbul
20:00 EET	Alex 26' (pen.), 29' (pen.), 48' (pen.), 83', 89'; Mehmet Topuz (yellow card) 46'; Bekir İrtegün 73'	Report	(yellow card) 6' Kağan Söylemezgiller; (red card) 28' Štefan Senecký; (yellow card) 47' Özden Öngün; (yellow card) 81' Aydın Toscalı	Stadium: Şükrü Saracoğlu Stadium; Referee: Cüneyt Çakır

21 May 2011 34	Ankaragücü	2–3	Antalyaspor	Ankara
17:00 EET	Bayram Olgun (yellow card) 44'; Jan Rajnoch 47'; Roman Bednář 56'; Turgut Doğan Şahin (yellow card) 66'; Stanislav Šesták (yellow card) 49' (yellow-red card) 88'; Drago Gabrić (yellow card) 89'	Report	2' Tita; 13', 44' (yellow card) 48' Necati Ateş; (yellow card) 70' İbrahim Dağaşan; (yellow card) 79' Erkan Sekman; (yellow card) 89' Kenan Özer	Stadium: Ankara 19 Mayıs Stadium; Referee: Abdullah Yılmaz

== Turkish Cup ==
=== Play-off round ===
27 October 2010	Ankaragücü	3–1	Tokatspor	Ankara
19:00 EET	Marek Sapara 23'; Metin Akan 71'; Roguy Méyé 89'	Report	86' Serhat Sağat	Stadium: Ankara 19 Mayıs Stadium; Referee: Hakan Ceylan

=== Group stage ===
Pos	Team	Pld	W	D	L	GF	GA	GD	Pts
1	Gençlerbirliği	4	2	1	1	6	4	+2	7
2	Bucaspor	4	2	1	1	7	6	+1	7
3	Ankaragücü	4	1	3	0	6	4	+2	6
4	Yeni Malatyaspor	4	1	1	2	3	5	−2	4
5	Fenerbahçe	4	1	0	3	7	10	−3	3

Source: tff.org (in Turkish)
Rules for classification: 1) points; 2) goal difference; 3) number of goals scored.

9 November 2010 1	Ankaragücü	4–2	Fenerbahçe	Ankara
20:00 EET	Jan Rajnoch 48'; Marek Sapara (yellow card) 53'; Theo Weeks (yellow card) 69'; Uğur Uçar (yellow card) 74'; Stanislav Šesták 77'; Štefan Senecký (yellow card) 81'; Gökhan Gönül 85' (o.g.); Kağan Söylemezgiller 90'	Report	12' (yellow card) 70' Semih Şentürk; (yellow card) 53' Caner Erkin; (yellow card) 83' Gökhan Gönül; 90' André Santos	Stadium: Ankara 19 Mayıs Stadium; Referee: Barış Şimşek

22 December 2010 2	Gençlerbirliği	1–1	Ankaragücü	Ankara
19:00 EET	Aykut Demir (yellow card) 36'; Mile Jedinak (yellow card) 38'; Oktay Delibalta 60'	Report	45' Marek Sapara; (yellow card) 64' Michael Klukowski	Stadium: Ankara 19 Mayıs Stadium; Referee: Serkan Çınar

17 January 2011 4	Ankaragücü	1–1	Bucaspor	Ankara
20:00 EET	Jan Rajnoch 38'; Adem Koçak (yellow card) 89'	Report	33' (yellow card) 90' Musa Aydın; (yellow card) 40' Erkan Taşkıran; (yellow card) 45' Jerko Leko	Stadium: Ankara 19 Mayıs Stadium; Referee: Fethi Serkan Koçak

27 January 2011 5	Yeni Malatyaspor	0–0	Ankaragücü	Malatya
20:00 EET		Report		Stadium: Malatya İnönü Stadium; Referee: İlker Meral
