= 2008 Turkish Cup final =

- Event: 2007–08 Turkish Cup
| Gençlerbirliği | Kayserispor |
| 0 | 0 |
- Kayserispor won 11–10 on penalties.
- Date: 7 May 2008
- Venue: Bursa Atatürk Stadium, Bursa
- Man of the Match: Mehmet Topuz (Kayserispor)
- Referee: Yunus Yıldırım (Turkey)
- Weather: Fine

The 2008 Turkish Cup final was a football match between Gençlerbirliği and Kayserispor and the final of the 2007–08 Turkish Cup. Kayserispor won 11–10 on penalties.

== Gençlerbirliği ==
Gençlerbirliği started the tournament in the second qualifying round. They beat Akçaabat Sebatspor 4–1, and proceeded to the group stage. Gençlerbirliği was put in Group B with Adana Demirspor, Trabzonspor, Manisaspor and Kırıkkalespor. Gençlerbirliği finished 1st and continued to the Quarter-finals. They beat Adana Demirspor 1–0 at home and 2–2 away. In the Semi-finals, Gençlerbirliği played Galatasaray. Gençlerbirliği won 1–0 at home and 1–1 in Istanbul. With the win over Galatasaray, they proceeded to the finals.

== Kayserispor ==
After finishing in second place in group C, Kayserispor played and beat G.Oftaşspor 2–0. In the Semi-finals, Kayseri beat Çaykur Rizespor 3–0 away and 4–1 at home. With this win Kayseri proceeded to the final.

== Final ==
After ending extra time with a 0–0 tie, poth teams competed in a penalty shootout. With the game tied at 10–10, Mehmet Çakır (Gençlerbirliği) missed the shot and Aydın Toscalı scored for Kayseri giving them an 11–10 victory giving Kayserispor their first Turkish Cup.

== Match details ==
7 May 2008
20:00

| Gençlerbirliği | 0 - 0 (a.e.t.) | Kayserispor |
|---|---|---|
| | Report |
Penalties
| Kahê (penalty scored); Mehmet Çakır (penalty scored); Mehmet Nas (penalty missed); Engin Baytar (penalty scored); Ergün Teber (penalty scored); Hakan Aslantaş (penalty scored); Abdel-Zaher El-Saqqa (penalty missed); Tuna Üzümcü (penalty scored); Daniel Addo (penalty scored); Kerem Şeras (penalty scored); Nicolás Peric (penalty scored); Kahê (penalty scored); Ergün Teber (penalty missed); Mehmet Çakır (penalty missed) | 10 – 11 | (penalty scored) Dimitar Ivankov; (penalty scored) Alioum Saidou; (penalty missed) Koray Çölgeçen; (penalty scored) Aydın Toscalı; (penalty scored) Kemal Okyay; (penalty scored) Delio Toledo; (penalty missed) Turgay Bahadır; (penalty scored) Mehmet Topuz; (penalty scored) Kamber Arslan; (penalty scored) Leonardo Andrés Iglesias; (penalty scored) Ali Turan; (penalty scored) Dimitar Ivankov; (penalty missed) Alioum Saidou; (penalty scored) Aydın Toscalı |

Bursa Atatürk Stadyumu, Bursa
Referee: Yunus Yıldırım

Gençlerbirliği
Kayserispor

GENÇLERBİRLİĞİ:
| GK | 22 | (Chile) Nicolás Peric |
| CB | 24 | (Ghana) Daniel Addo |
| CB | 35 | (Turkey) Tuna Üzümcü | (yellow card) 18' |
| RB | 6 | (Turkey) Erkan Özbey | | (substituted off) 92' |
| LB | 3 | (Turkey) Ergün Teber |
| DM | 7 | (Turkey) Mehmet Nas |
| DM | 61 | (Turkey) Kerem Şeras |
| RM | 12 | (Egypt) Abdel-Zaher El-Saqqa |
| LM | 25 | (Turkey) Engin Baytar |
| CF | 8 | (Brazil) Kahê |
| CF | 14 | (Nigeria) Isaac Promise | | (substituted off) 80' |
Substitutes:
| GK | 1 | (Turkey) Recep Öztürk |
| MF | 11 | (Turkey) Burhan Eşer |
| MF | 15 | (Ghana) Adamu Mohammed |
| MF | 17 | (Turkey) Ferhat Kiraz |
| MF | 25 | (Turkey) Hakan Aslantaş | | (substituted on) 92' |
| FW | 10 | (Turkey) Mehmet Çakır | | (substituted on) 80' |
| FW | 9 | (Turkey) Okan Öztürk |
Manager:
(Turkey) Mesut Bakkal

KAYSERİSPOR:
| GK | 27 | (Bulgaria) Dimitar Ivankov |
| CB | 5 | (Turkey) Ali Turan | (yellow card) 3' |
| CB | 25 | (Turkey) Aydın Toscalı |
| RB | 51 | (Turkey) Koray Çölgeçen |
| LB | 12 | (Argentina) Delio Toledo |
| DM | 20 | (Cameroon) Alioum Saidou |
| DM | 8 | (Turkey) Ragıp Başdağ | | (substituted off) 100' |
| RM | 66 | (Turkey) Mehmet Topuz |
| LM | 67 | (Turkey) Mehmet Eren Boyraz | | (substituted off) 88' |
| CF | 7 | (Argentina) Leonardo Andrés Iglesias |
| CF | 19 | (Argentina) Franco Cángele | | (substituted off) 114' |
Substitutes:
| GK | 1 | (Turkey) Hasan Sönmez |
| DF | 2 | (Turkey) Durmuş Bayram |
| DF | 4 | (Argentina) Juan Pablo Avendaño |
| DF | 11 | (Turkey) Kemal Okyay | | (substituted on) 114' |
| MF | 18 | (Turkey) Ali Çamdalı |
| MF | 38 | (Turkey) Kamber Arslan | | (substituted on) 100' |
| FW | 22 | (Turkey) Turgay Bahadır | | (substituted on) 88' |
Manager:
(Turkey) Tolunay Kafkas

Man of the match:
Mehmet Topuz (Kayserispor)
Referee:
(Turkey) Yunus Yıldırım
Assistant referees:
(Turkey) Bülent Gökçü
(Turkey) Serkan Ok
Fourth referee:
(Turkey) Koray Gençerler
