= 2007–08 Turkish Cup =

Fortis Türkiye Kupası

Tournament details
- Country: Turkey
- Teams: 72

Final positions
- Champions: Kayserispor
- Runners-up: Gençlerbirliği
- UEFA Cup: Kayserispor

Tournament statistics
- Top goal scorer(s): Leonardo Iglesias (6 goals)

The 2007–08 Turkey Cup was the 46th edition of the annual tournament that determined the association football Süper Lig Turkish Cup (Turkish: Türkiye Kupası) champion under the auspices of the Turkish Football Federation (Turkish: Türkiye Futbol Federasyonu; TFF). Kayserispor won in the final. This tournament was conducted under the UEFA Cup system having replaced at the 44th edition a standard knockout competition scheme. The results of the tournament also determined which clubs would be promoted or relegated.

== First qualifying round ==
Team 1	Score	Team 2
Boluspor	3–2	Samsunspor
Eskişehirspor	1–0	Kocaelispor
Sakaryaspor	2–0	Bozüyükspor
Adana Demirspor	0–0 (3–2 p)	Antalyaspor
Gaziantep B. B.	4–1	Adanaspor
Altay SK	3–3 (7–6 p)	Karşıyaka
Alanyaspor	1–0	Tarsus Idman Yurdu
Küçükköyspor	1–3	Kartalspor
Sarıyer	1–0	Gaziosmanpaşa
Tepecik Belediyespor	2–1 (a.e.t.)	Istanbulspor
MKE Kırıkkalespor	1–0	Bugsaşspor
Türk Telekomspor	0–2	Kayseri Erciyesspor
Akçaabat Sebatspor	3–0	Araklıspor
Orduspor	0–1	Arsinspor
Elazığspor	0–2	Diskispor
Mardinspor	1–2	Diyarbakırspor
Şanlıurfaspor	6–0	Malatyaspor
Uşakspor	1–0	Afyonkarahisarspor

== Second qualifying round ==
Team 1	Score	Team 2
Gençlerbirliği OFTAŞ	4–0	Uşakspor
Kayserispor	3–1	Diyarbakırspor
Çaykur Rizespor	3–1	Eskişehirspor
Bursaspor	1–0	Boluspor
Gaziantepspor	2–0	Kayseri Erciyesspor
Manisaspor	5–0	Gaziantep B. B.
Adana Demirspor	1–0	Altay SK
İstanbul B. B.	2–3	Diskispor
Ankaraspor	2–1	Kartalspor
Arsinspor	0–2	Denizlispor
Şanlıurfaspor	2–1	Konyaspor
Alanyaspor	1–0	Sivasspor
Sarıyer	2–0	Kasımpaşa S.K.
MKE Kırıkkalespor	4–2	Sakaryaspor
Gençlerbirliği	4–1	Akçaabat Sebatspor
Tepecik Belediyespor	1–3 (a.e.t.)	Ankaragücü

== Group stage ==
=== Group A ===
Pos	Team	Pld	W	D	L	GF	GA	GD	Pts	ÇYR	BJK	ANK	AKG	DIS
1	Çaykur Rizespor	4	3	1	0	5	2	+3	10				1–0	2–1
2	Beşiktaş J.K.	4	2	1	1	9	4	+5	7	1–2		3–1		
3	Ankaraspor	4	2	1	1	6	5	+1	7	0–0			2–0	
4	Ankaragücü	4	1	1	2	4	5	−1	4		1–1			3–1
5	Diskispor	4	0	0	4	4	12	−8	0		0–4	2–3		

Legend: Blue = home team win; Yellow = draw; Red = away team win.

=== Group B ===
Pos	Team	Pld	W	D	L	GF	GA	GD	Pts	GEN	ADA	TRA	MAN	KRK
1	Gençlerbirliği S.K.	4	3	0	1	10	3	+7	9		1–0		3–0	
2	Adana Demirspor	4	3	0	1	6	3	+3	9			1–0	2–1	
3	Trabzonspor	4	2	0	2	8	6	+2	6	3–2				5–0
4	Manisaspor	4	2	0	2	6	6	0	6			3–0		2–1
5	Kırıkkalespor	4	0	0	4	2	14	−12	0	0–4	1–3			

Legend: Blue = home team win; Yellow = draw; Red = away team win.

=== Group C ===
Pos	Team	Pld	W	D	L	GF	GA	GD	Pts	FEN	KAY	ŞAN	GAZ	ALA
1	Fenerbahçe S.K.	4	2	2	0	13	5	+8	8			3–2	0–0	
2	Kayserispor	4	2	2	0	8	1	+7	8	0–0				5–0
3	Şanlıurfaspor	4	1	2	1	7	5	+2	5		1–1			3–0
4	Gaziantepspor	4	1	2	1	4	3	+1	5		0–2	1–1		
5	Alanyaspor	4	0	0	4	3	21	−18	0	3–10			0–3	

Legend: Blue = home team win; Yellow = draw; Red = away team win.

=== Group D ===
Pos	Team	Pld	W	D	L	GF	GA	GD	Pts	GOF	GAL	BUR	DEN	SAR
1	Gençlerbirliği OFTAŞ	4	3	0	1	9	2	+7	9		3–0		3–1	0–3
2	Galatasaray	4	2	1	1	7	6	+1	7				2–1	3–0
3	Bursaspor	4	1	2	1	5	5	0	5	1–0	2–2			
4	Denizlispor	4	1	1	2	5	6	−1	4			0–0		3–1
5	Sarıyer G.K.	4	1	0	3	4	11	−7	3			3–2		

Legend: Blue = home team win; Yellow = draw; Red = away team win.

== Quarter-finals ==
Team 1	Agg.	Team 2	1st leg	2nd leg
Gençlerbirliği OFTAŞ	0–2	Kayserispor	0–0	0–2
Adana Demirspor	2–3	Gençlerbirliği	0–1	2–2
Çaykur Rizespor	3–3 (a)	Beşiktaş	1–0	2–3
Fenerbahçe	1–2	Galatasaray	0–0	1–2

== Semi-finals ==
=== Summary table ===
Team 1	Agg.	Team 2	1st leg	2nd leg
Çaykur Rizespor	1–7	Kayserispor	0–3	1–4
Gençlerbirliği	2–1	Galatasaray	1–0	1–1

=== 1st leg ===
18 March 2008 Semi-final	Çaykur Rizespor	0–3	Kayserispor	Rize
20:00 EET (UTC+02)			Iglesias 23'; Cángele 68'; Toledo 83'	Stadium: Rize Atatürk Stadium; Referee: Kuddusi Müftüoğlu

19 March 2008 Semi-final	Gençlerbirliği	1–0	Galatasaray	Ankara
20:00 EET (UTC+02)	Burhan 71'			Stadium: Ankara 19 Mayıs Stadium; Referee: Halis Özkahya

=== 2nd leg ===
15 April 2008 Semi-final	Galatasaray	1–1	Gençlerbirliği	Istanbul
20:00 EEST (UTC+03)	Ümit 90'		Tuna 76'	Stadium: Ali Sami Yen Stadium; Referee: Hüseyin Göçek

16 April 2008 Semi-final	Kayserispor	4–1	Çaykur Rizespor	Kayseri
20:00 EEST (UTC+03)	Toledo 20'; Iglesias 54', 76', 89'		Chaves 26'	Stadium: Kayseri Atatürk Stadium; Referee: Aytekin Durmaz

== Final ==
7 May 2008 Final	Gençlerbirliği	0–0 (10–11 p)	Kayserispor	Bursa, Turkey
20:00 EEST (UTC+03)		Report		Stadium: Bursa Atatürk Stadyumu; Attendance: 17,000; Referee: Yunus Yıldırım; Man of the Match: Mehmet Topuz
	Penalties
	Kahê (penalty scored); Mehmet Ç. (penalty scored); Mehmet Nas (penalty missed); Engin (penalty scored); Ergün (penalty scored); Hakan (penalty scored); El Saka (penalty missed); Tuna (penalty scored); Addo (penalty scored); Kerem (penalty scored); Peric (penalty scored); Kahê (penalty scored); Ergün (penalty missed); Mehmet Ç. (penalty missed)		(penalty scored) Ivankov; (penalty scored) Saidou; (penalty missed) Koray; (penalty scored) Aydın; (penalty scored) Kemal; (penalty scored) Toledo; (penalty missed) Turgay; (penalty scored) Mehmet; (penalty scored) Kamber; (penalty scored) Leonardo; (penalty scored) Ali Turan; (penalty scored) Ivankov; (penalty missed) Saidou; (penalty scored) Aydın
