= İzmir Atatürk Stadium =

Multi-purpose stadium in İzmir, Turkey

İzmir Atatürk Stadyumu
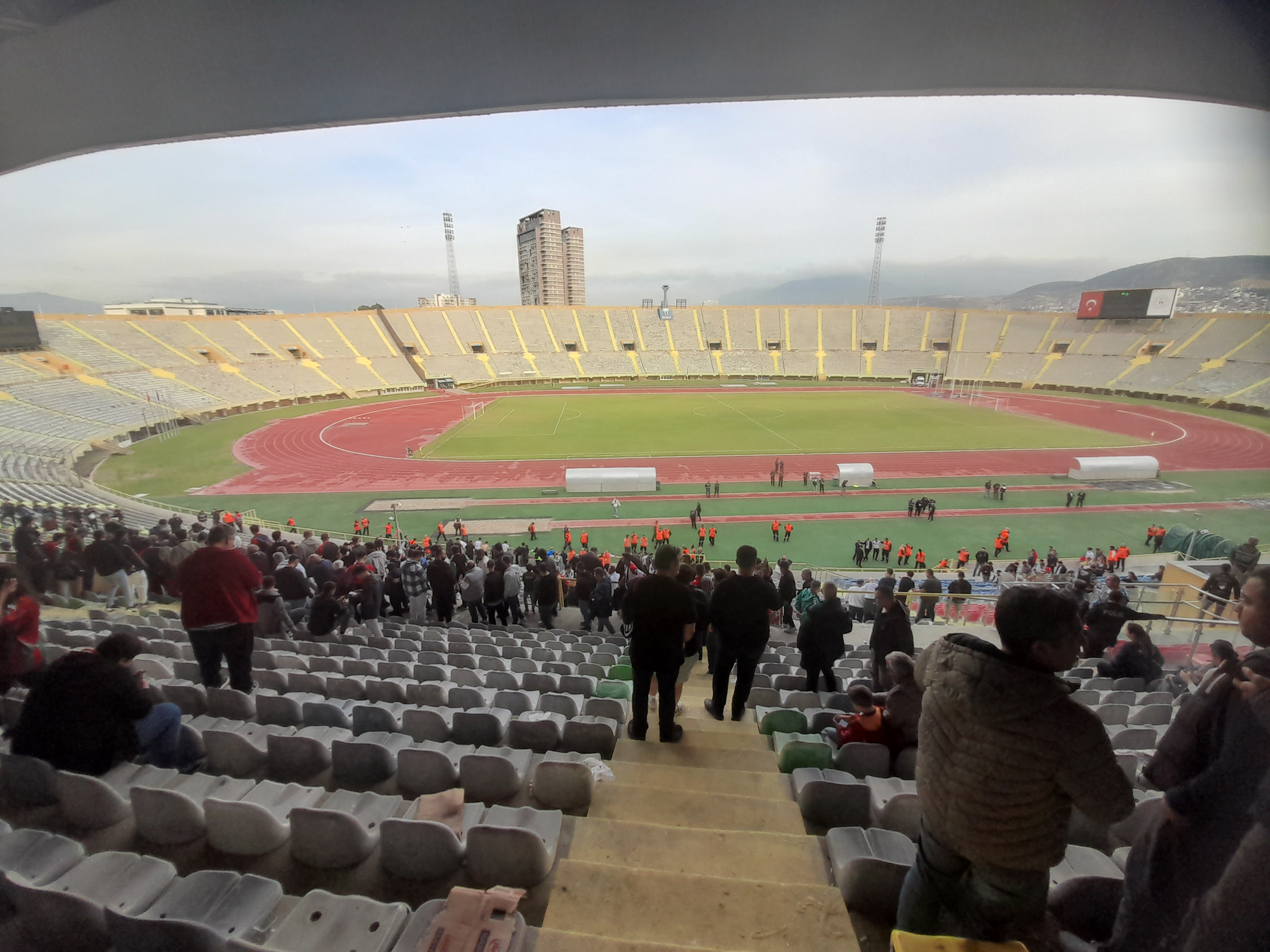
- Interactive map of İzmir Atatürk Stadyumu
- Full name: İzmir Atatürk Stadyumu
- Location: İzmir
- Coordinates: 38°26′6″N 27°10′41″E
- Owner: Ministry of Youth and Sports
- Capacity: 70,000; 63,000; 58,008; 54,960; 51,295 (2005–present)
- Surface: Grass
- Scoreboard: Yes
- Record attendance: 68,034 (Turkey-Malta, 31 October 1976)
- Field size: 105 x 68 m
- Public transit: Halkapınar

Construction
- Groundbreaking: 10 September 1968
- Built: 1968–1971
- Opened: 1971
- Renovated: 2005
- Architect: Harbi Hotan
- Main contractor: Kemal Uzan

Tenants
- Altay S.K., Karşıyaka S.K.

İzmir Atatürk Stadium (Turkish: İzmir Atatürk Stadyumu) is a multi-purpose stadium in İzmir, Turkey. It was named after the Turkish statesman Mustafa Kemal Atatürk. It is currently used mostly for football matches and occasionally for track and field events. The stadium holds 51,295 people. It was opened in October 1971, and most recently refurbished in 2005. İzmir football teams Altay S.K. and Karşıyaka S.K. occasionally use the stadium for high attendance matches. İzmir Atatürk Stadium's running track has ten lanes.

The stadium hosted the 1971 Mediterranean Games, the Islamic Games in 1980 and the 2005 Summer Universiade. The stadium also hosted the Fortis Turkey Cup Final in 2009 in which Beşiktaş beat Fenerbahçe 4-2 to win the cup for the 8th time.

Izmir Atatürk Stadium hosted a concert on September 9, 1986, featuring Sandra, C.C. Catch, Bad Boys Blue, Iva Zanicchi, Ricchi e Poveri, Caroline Verdi, MFÖ, and Grup Gündoğarken, organized to raise funds for African countries struggling with hunger and drought.

American singer Michael Jackson planned to perform at the stadium on October 7, 1992 on his Dangerous World Tour, but this show was cancelled due to illness.

== Records ==
Attendance Records
Rank	Attendance	Date	Game
1	68,034	31 October 1976	Turkey – Malta
2	67,696	16 May 1981	Karşıyaka SK – Göztepe S.K.^{[A]}
3	66,701	21 January 1973	Galatasaray SK – Fenerbahçe SK
4	62,825	12 October 1971	France Amateurs – Turkey B
5	62,200	30 January 1989	Altay SK – Fenerbahçe SK
6	61,810	24 August 1994	Galatasaray SK – FC Avenir Beggen
7	59,406	15 November 1987	Altay SK – Galatasaray SK

A. The official attendance was reported as 67,696, but the actual figure is believed to be anywhere between 80,000 and 85,000.

Events and tenants
Preceded by Tunis; 1967	Host of the 1971 Mediterranean Games; İzmir Atatürk Stadium; 1971	Succeeded by Algiers; 1975
Preceded by -	Islamic Games; Opening and Closing Ceremonies; 1980	Succeeded by -
Preceded by Daegu Stadium; Daegu	Summer Universiade; Opening and Closing Ceremonies; 2005	Succeeded by Rajamangala Stadium; Bangkok
Preceded by Atatürk Olympic Stadium; 2005	Host of the Turkish Cup Final; İzmir Atatürk Stadium; 2006 & 2007	Succeeded by Bursa Atatürk Stadium; 2008
Preceded by Bursa Atatürk Stadium; 2008	Host of the Turkish Cup Final; İzmir Atatürk Stadium; 2009	Succeeded by Şanlıurfa GAP Arena; 2010
