= Durmuş Bayram =

Turkish footballer

Personal information
- Full name: Durmuş Bayram
- Date of birth: March 15, 1986 (age 40)
- Place of birth: Germany
- Height: 1.78 m (5 ft 10 in)
- Position: Defender

Youth career
- TV Asberg
- Schalke 04

Senior career*
Years	Team	Apps	(Gls)
2005	Schalke 04 II	1	(0)
2005–2006	Rizespor	0	(0)
2006–2007	Schalke 04 II	37	(1)
2007–2010	Kayserispor	32	(0)
2011–2012	Şekerspor	24	(0)
- * Club domestic league appearances and goals

Durmuş Bayram (born March 15, 1986) is a Turkish former professional footballer who played as a defender.

== Honours ==
- Kayserispor
  - Turkish Cup (1): 2008
