= Delio Toledo =

Paraguayan footballer (born 1976)

Personal information
- Full name: Delio César Toledo Rodas
- Date of birth: 10 February 1976 (age 50)
- Place of birth: Doctor Cecilio Báez, Paraguay
- Height: 1.82 m (5 ft 11 1/2 in)
- Position: Left back

Senior career*
Years	Team	Apps	(Gls)
1996–1998	Atlético Colegiales	61	(4)
1999	Cerro Porteño	15	(3)
1999	Udinese	2	(0)
2000–2001	Espanyol	20	(1)
2001–2002	Colón Santa Fe	31	(0)
2002–2006	Zaragoza	109	(4)
2006–2010	Kayserispor	99	(5)
2011	3 de Febrero	1	(0)
Total		338	(17)

International career
1999–2008	Paraguay	35	(4)
- * Club domestic league appearances and goals

Delio César Toledo Rodas (born 2 October 1976) is a Paraguayan retired footballer who played as a left back.

During his professional career, he represented clubs in five countries, competing mainly in La Liga. Toledo appeared with the Paraguay national team at the 1999 Copa América and the 2006 World Cup.

== Club career ==
Born in Doctor Cecilio Báez, Caaguazú Department, Toledo started his career in Atlético Colegiales from where, after a good season, he was transferred to Cerro Porteño. He then moved to Europe where he played briefly for Udinese (January–December 1999) and Espanyol (January 2000 – June 2001); with the latter club, he was involved in a forged passport scandal which led to a ban, in his first full season.

After a brief spell back in South America with Colón Santa Fe, Toledo returned to Spain, now with Real Zaragoza in the second division. He scored once in 31 games en route to promotion, being used regularly in the subsequent three seasons.

Toledo signed with Kayserispor of Turkey in July 2006, winning the domestic cup in his second year. He decided to retire from football due to injury in early 2010, but returned to football – and Kayserispor – on 29 March, in a match against Trabzonspor.

== International career ==
Internationally, Toledo represented Paraguay on 35 occasions, playing 82 minutes against England in a group stage 0–1 loss at the 2006 FIFA World Cup. He was also selected for the squad at the 1999 Copa América played on home soil, as the national team reached the quarterfinals.

Toledo earned his first cap on 7 March 1999 in the Copa de la Paz, netting the second goal in a 3–0 win over Bolivia.

International goals
#	Date	Venue	Opponent	Score	Result	Competition
1.	7 March 1999	Guatemala City, Guatemala	Bolivia	2–0	3–0	Copa de la Paz
2.	17 June 1999	Ciudad del Este, Paraguay	Uruguay	2–3	2–3	Friendly
3.	31 October 1999	Chicago, United States	Mexico	1–0	1–0	Friendly
4.	3 June 2000	Asunción, Paraguay	Ecuador	1–0	3–1	2002 World Cup qualification

== Honours ==
=== Club ===
Espanyol

- Copa del Rey: 1999–2000

Zaragoza

- Copa del Rey: 2003–04
- Supercopa de España: 2004

Kayserispor

- Turkish Cup: 2007–08
- Turkish Super Cup: Runner-up 2008
