= Kemal Okyay =

Turkish footballer

Personal information
- Date of birth: 25 February 1985 (age 41)
- Place of birth: Kayseri, Turkey
- Height: 1.76 m (5 ft 9 1/2 in)
- Positions: Left back; left winger

Youth career
- 1999–2000: Kayseri İl Özel İdaresispor
- 2000–2003: Kayserispor

Senior career*
Years	Team	Apps	(Gls)
2003–2009	Kayserispor		
2008–2009	→ Kayseri Erciyesspor (loan)	32	(2)
2009–2010	Manisaspor	13	(1)
2010–2013	Kayseri Erciyesspor	34	(2)
2013–2014	Nazilli Belediyespor	19	(0)
2014–2015	Tavşanlı Linyitspor	28	(0)

International career
2005–2006	Turkey U20	5	(0)
- * Club domestic league appearances and goals

Kemal Okyay (born 25 February 1985) is a Turkish former footballer. He was a left winger. He studied at Erciyes University.

He has played for national under-20 football team at 5 times.

== Honours ==
- Kayserispor
  - Turkish Cup (1): 2008
