= Muhammet Hanifi Yoldaş =

Turkish footballer

Muhammet Yoldaş
Personal information
- Full name: Muhammet Hanifi Yoldaş
- Date of birth: 20 April 1983 (age 43)
- Place of birth: Diest, Belgium
- Height: 1.85 m (6 ft 1 in)
- Position: Center back

Senior career*
Years	Team	Apps	(Gls)
2001–2002	Liége	–	(–)
2002–2003	K.R.C. Genk	–	(–)
2003–2004	R.A.E.C. Mons	13	(0)
2004–2009	Ankaraspor	65	(2)
2005–2006	→ Kayserispor (loan)	30	(1)
2009–2010	→ MKE Ankaragücü (loan)	9	(1)
2010–2011	MKE Ankaragücü	2	(0)
2011	Karabükspor	1	(0)

International career^{‡}
2004–2005	Turkey U-21	14	(0)
2006	Turkey B	2	(0)
- * Club domestic league appearances and goals as of 24 January 2011 ‡ National team caps and goals as of 24 January 2011

Muhammet Hanifi Yoldaş (born 20 April 1983 in Diest) is a former professional footballer. Born in Belgium, he represented Turkey at under-21 international level.
