= Leonardo Iglesias =

Argentine footballer (born 1979)

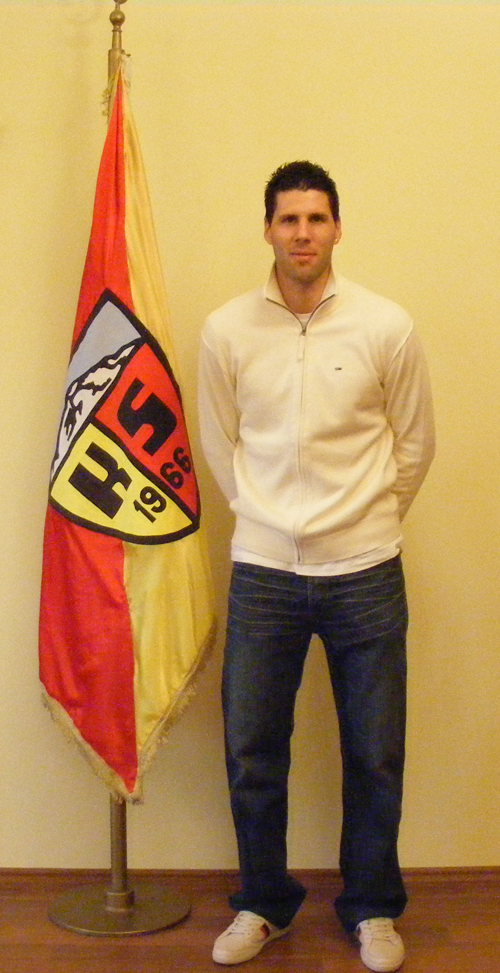

Personal information
- Full name: Leonardo Andrés Iglesias
- Date of birth: August 28, 1979 (age 47)
- Place of birth: Lanús, Argentina
- Height: 1.87 m (6 ft 1 1/2 in)
- Position: Forward

Senior career*
Years	Team	Apps	(Gls)
1997–1998	Talleres (RE)	29	(9)
1998–1999	CD Logroñés	9	(2)
2000	Villa Española	19	(5)
2000–2001	Gimnasia y Esgrima (ER)	33	(12)
2001	Burgos CF	37	(14)
2002	Leonesa	28	(8)
2002–2003	CM Peralta	22	(7)
2003–2004	San Martín (M)	27	(10)
2004–2005	Godoy Cruz	31	(12)
2005	Tigre	12	(1)
2006	Atlético Rafaela	13	(5)
2006–2008	Kayserispor	69	(19)
2008–2009	Ankaragücü	24	(6)
2009–2010	Bursaspor	9	(0)
- * Club domestic league appearances and goals as of 20 May 2010

Leonardo Andrés Iglesias (born August 28, 1979) is an Argentine former football forward.

== Career ==
Iglesias started his career in the regionalised Argentine 3rd division with Club Atlético Talleres de Remedios de Escalada in 1997. He has played for Gimnasia y Esgrima (ER), San Martín de Mendoza. Godoy Cruz, Club Atlético Tigre and Atlético Rafaela in the National 2nd Division in Argentina.

Iglesias has played for several teams outside Argentina these are; CD Logroñés, Burgos CF, Leonesa and CM Peralta in Spain, Villa Española in Uruguay and his current club, Ankaragücü and Kayserispor in Turkey.

== Honours ==
- Kayserispor
  - Turkish Cup (1): 2008
- Bursaspor
  - Süper Lig (1): 2009-10
