= Alioum Saidou =

Cameroonian footballer

Personal information
- Full name: Alioum Saidou
- Date of birth: 19 February 1978 (age 48)
- Place of birth: Maroua, Cameroon
- Height: 1.82 m (6 ft 0 in)
- Position: Defensive midfielder

Youth career
- 1995–1999: Coton Sport

Senior career*
Years	Team	Apps	(Gls)
1999–2004	İstanbulspor	147	(12)
2004–2006	Galatasaray	29	(0)
2005	→ Malatyaspor (loan)	13	(0)
2006–2007	Nantes	18	(0)
2007–2010	Kayserispor	79	(5)
2010–2011	Sivasspor	4	(0)
Total		290	(17)

International career
2003–2008	Cameroon	15	(2)
- * Club domestic league appearances and goals

Alioum Saidou (born 19 February 1978) is a Cameroonian former professional footballer who played as a defensive midfielder. He played international football for the Cameroon national team, with whom he played at the 2006 Africa Cup of Nations.

== Career ==
Born in Maroua, Saidou started his career in his native Cameroon at local side Coton Sport before being spotted by scouts from İstanbulspor. He joined Galatasaray S.K., before moving to Malatyaspor in 2005.

== Honours ==
Galatasaray

- Süper Lig: 2005–06

Kayserispor

- Turkish Cup: 2008
