= Ali Turan =

Turkish footballer (born 1983)

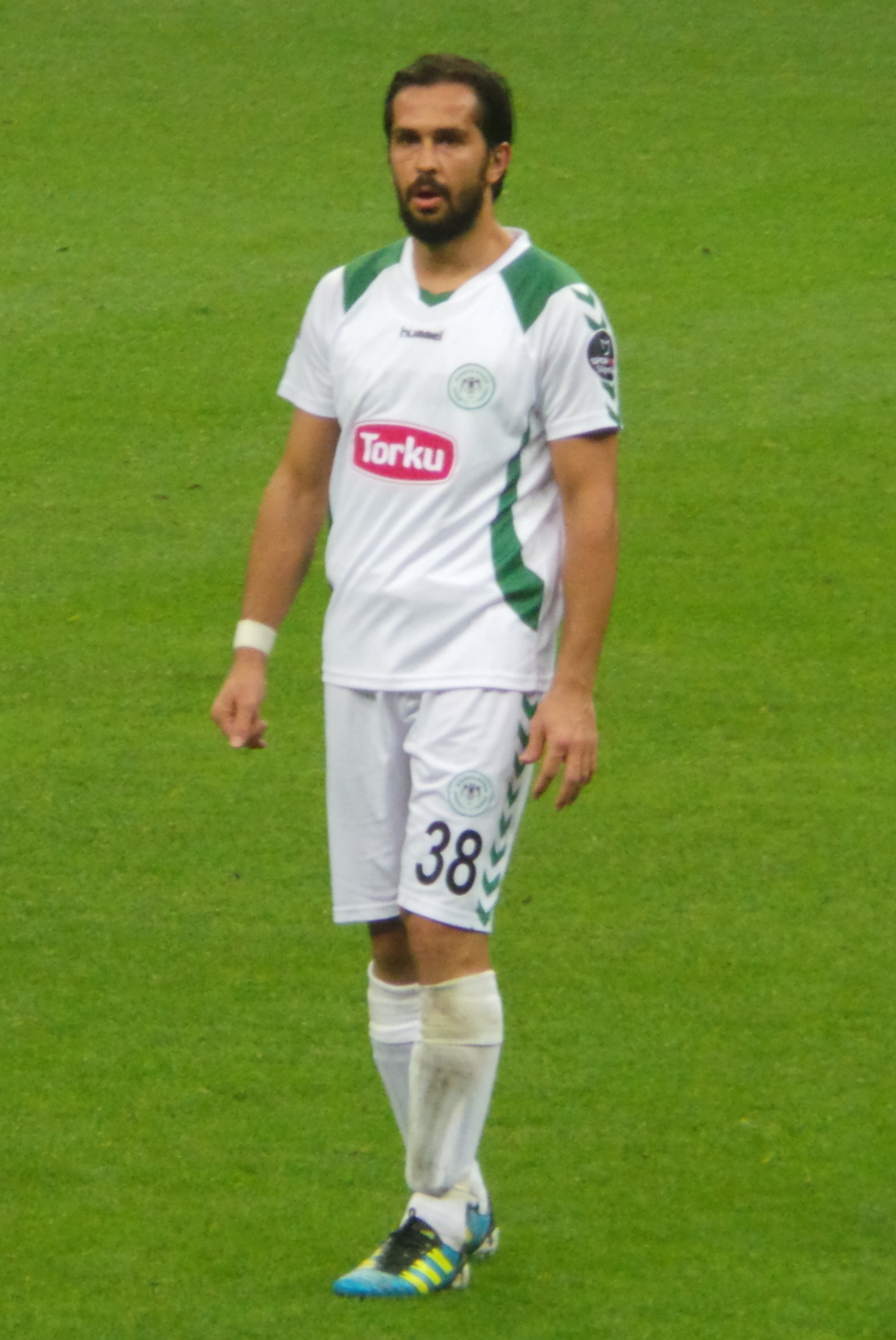

Personal information
- Date of birth: 6 September 1983 (age 43)
- Place of birth: Kayseri, Turkey
- Height: 1.86 m (6 ft 1 in)
- Position: Defender

Youth career
- 1995–2000: Ağırnasşimşekspor
- 2000–2002: Kayserispor

Senior career*
Years	Team	Apps	(Gls)
2002–2010	Kayserispor	105	(0)
2006–2007	→ Kayseri Erciyesspor (loan)	12	(0)
2010–2011	Galatasaray	9	(0)
2011–2012	Antalyaspor	44	(0)
2012–2020	Konyaspor	181	(0)

International career^{‡}
2004–2005	Turkey U21	8	(3)
2008	Turkey A2	1	(0)
- * Club domestic league appearances and goals as of 25 July 2020 ‡ National team caps and goals as of 2 February 2012

Ali Turan (born 6 September 1983) is a Turkish footballer who most recently played for Konyaspor.

== Club career ==
Turan began his professional career with Kayserispor, and went on loan to Kayseri Erciyesspor during the 2006–07 Super Lig season. He was one of the young players of Kayserispor whom former coach Ertuğrul Sağlam trusted and gave the opportunity to play past seasons. He's regarded as a promising center back.

From next season Turan would be playing for Galatasaray as he has signed a pre-contract. Kayserispor was very angry with Turan's decision so they have lowered him to their reserve team and removed him from captain. Now he playing for Antalyaspor Ali Turan signed a 3-year deal with Antalyaspor after getting released from Galatasaray in January 2011.

== Career statistics ==
As of 1 September 2010

Club	Season	League		Cup		League Cup		Europe		Total	
Club	Season	Apps	Goals	Apps	Goals	Apps	Goals	Apps	Goals	Apps	Goals
Kayserispor	2001–02	4	0	0	0	-	-	-	-	4	0
Kayserispor	2002–03	30	1	1	0	-	-	-	-	31	1
Kayserispor	2003–04	27	1	2	0	-	-	-	-	29	1
Kayserispor	2004–05	28	0	3	0	-	-	-	-	31	0
Kayserispor	2005–06	0	0	0	0	-	-	-	-	0	0
Kayserispor	2006–07	0	0	1	0	-	-	-	-	1	0
Kayserispor	Total	89	2	7	0	0	0	0	0	96	2
Kayseri Erciyesspor	2006–07	12	0	5	0	-	-	-	-	17	0
Kayseri Erciyesspor	Total	12	0	5	0	0	0	0	0	17	0
Kayserispor	2007–08	31	0	8	1	1	0	-	-	40	1
Kayserispor	2008–09	30	0	5	0	-	-	-	-	35	0
Kayserispor	2009–10	16	0	0	0	-	-	-	-	16	0
Kayserispor	Total	77	0	13	1	1	0	0	0	91	1
Galatasaray	2010–11	3	0	0	0	0	0	3	0	3	0
Galatasaray	Total	3	0	0	0	0	0	3	0	3	0
Career total		181	2	25	1	1	0	3	0	207	3

== Honours ==
Kayserispor

- Turkish Cup: 2008

Konyaspor

- Turkish Cup: 2016–17
- Turkish Super Cup: 2017
