= Kamber Arslan =

Turkish footballer (born 1980)

Personal information
- Full name: Kamber Arslan
- Date of birth: 5 January 1980 (age 46)
- Place of birth: Kayseri, Turkey
- Position: Defensive midfielder

Youth career
- 1997–1999: Kayseri Sağlıkspor

Senior career*
Years	Team	Apps	(Gls)
1999–2001	Kayseri Elektrikspor	60	(14)
2001–2009	Kayserispor	225	(14)
2008–2009	→ Kayseri Erciyesspor (loan)	9	(1)
2009–2010	Antalyaspor	6	(0)
2010	Kayseri Erciyesspor	10	(0)
2011	Kocaeli Birlik Spor	13	(1)
2013–2014	Gümüşhanespor	7	(0)
- * Club domestic league appearances and goals

Kamber Arslan (born 5 January 1980 in Kayseri, Turkey) is a Turkish former football defender and defensive midfielder. He has played for Kayseri Erciyesspor in the TFF First League.

== Club career ==
Arslan previously played for several seasons with Kayserispor.

== Honours ==
- Kayserispor
  - Turkish Cup (1): 2008
