= Koray Çölgeçen =

Turkish footballer

Personal information
- Full name: Koray Çölgeçen
- Date of birth: 28 May 1985 (age 41)
- Place of birth: İzmir, Turkey
- Height: 1.85 m (6 ft 1 in)
- Positions: Centre back; right back

Team information
- Current team: Tokatspor
- Number: 5

Senior career*
Years	Team	Apps	(Gls)
2007–2009	Kayserispor	25	(3)
2009–2010	Ankaragücü	15	(1)
2010–2011	Bucaspor	19	(1)
2011–2012	Denizlispor	8	(1)
2012–2013	Adanaspor	1	(1)
2013	→ Balıkesirspor (loan)	10	(2)
2013–2016	Alanyaspor	37	(3)
2016–	Tokatspor	5	(1)
- * Club domestic league appearances and goals as of 25 December 2016 (UTC)

Koray Çölgeçen (born 28 May 1985 in İzmir, Turkey) is a Turkish football player who plays as a defender for Tokatspor.

== Honours ==
- Kayserispor
  - Turkish Cup (1): 2008
