= Murat Duruer =

Turkish footballer

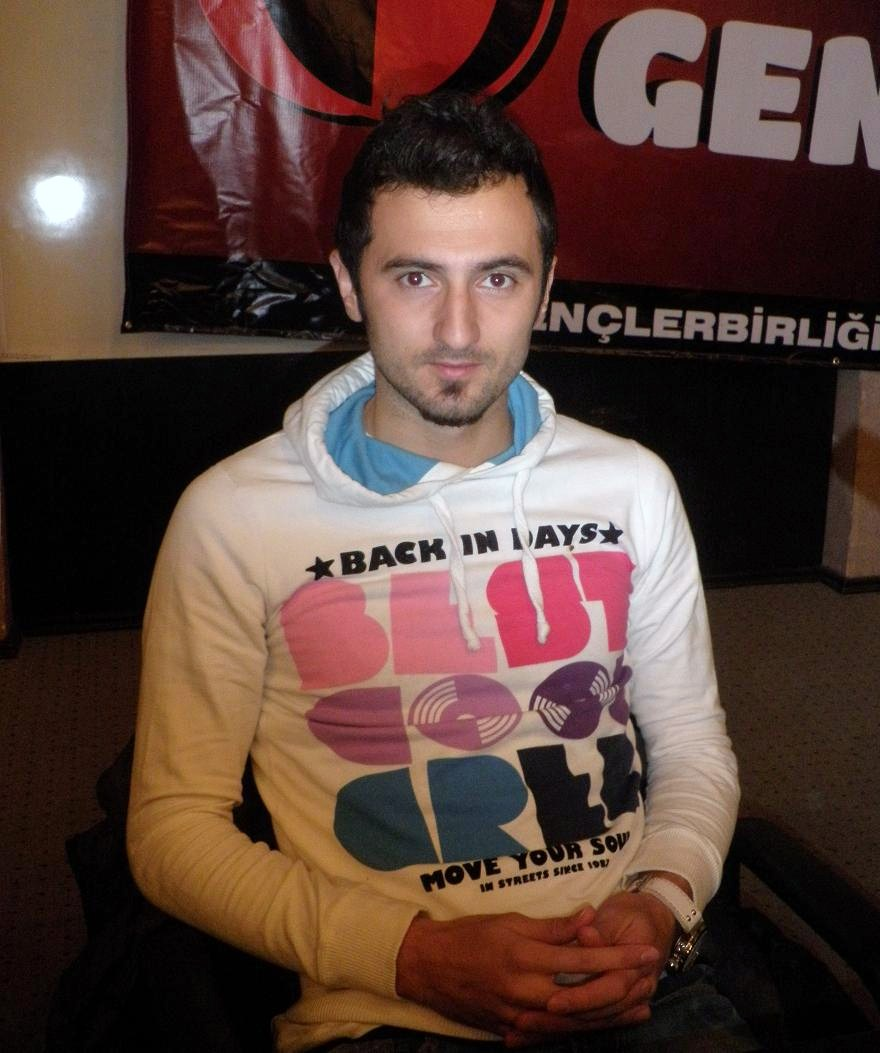

Personal information
- Date of birth: 15 January 1988 (age 38)
- Place of birth: Gerede, Bolu, Turkey
- Height: 1.82 m (6 ft 0 in)
- Position: Winger

Youth career
- 2001–2004: Ankaragücü

Senior career*
Years	Team	Apps	(Gls)
2004–2012	Ankaragücü	133	(8)
2012	Gençlerbirliği	8	(0)
2012–2014	Antalyaspor	56	(3)
2014–2016	Çaykur Rizespor	33	(2)
2016–2017	Kayserispor	7	(0)
2017–2018	Gençlerbirliği	19	(0)
2018	Adana Demirspor	2	(0)
2018–2019	İstanbulspor	15	(1)

International career
2003–2004	Turkey U16	20	(3)
2004–2005	Turkey U17	25	(4)
2005–2006	Turkey U18	13	(1)
2006–2007	Turkey U19	14	(0)
2006–2008	Turkey U21	4	(0)
2011–2012	Turkey A2	5	(1)
2014	Turkey	1	(0)
- * Club domestic league appearances and goals as of 22:58, 27 June 2019 (UTC)

Murat Duruer (born 15 January 1988) is a Turkish professional footballer who most recently played for Turkish TFF First League club İstanbulspor. He plays as a left winger.

Murat Duruer earned his first cap for Turkey on 5 March 2014, in a friendly match against Sweden.
