= Uğur Uçar =

Turkish footballer (born 1987)

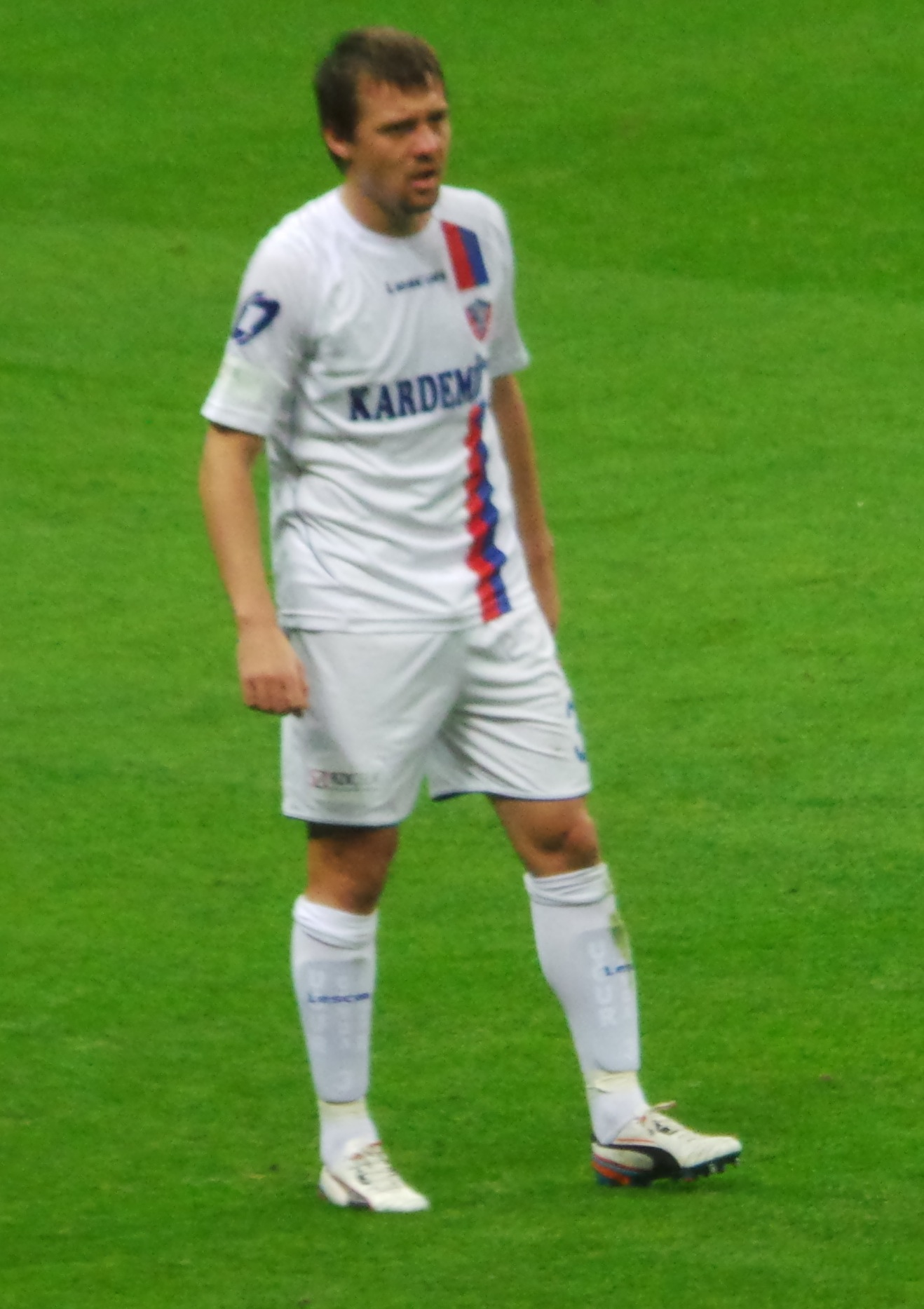
- Uçar in 2013

Personal information
- Date of birth: 5 April 1987 (age 39)
- Place of birth: Bakırköy, Istanbul, Turkey
- Height: 1.80 m (5 ft 11 in)
- Position: Right back

Team information
- Current team: Alanyaspor (head coach)

Youth career
- 1999–2004: Galatasaray A2

Senior career*
| Years | Team | Apps | (Gls) |
| 2004–2010 | Galatasaray | 60 | (0) |
| 2006–2007 | → Kayserispor (loan) | 22 | (0) |
| 2010–2011 | Ankaragücü | 33 | (0) |
| 2011–2014 | Karabükspor | 39 | (0) |
| 2014–2021 | Başakşehir | 77 | (0) |
| 2021–2022 | Pendikspor | 6 | (0) |

International career
| 2002 | Turkey U16 | 10 | (1) |
| 2002–2004 | Turkey U17 | 38 | (0) |
| 2003–2005 | Turkey U18 | 11 | (0) |
| 2004 | Turkey U19 | 2 | (0) |
| 2005 | Turkey U20 | 7 | (0) |
| 2005–2008 | Turkey U21 | 20 | (0) |
| 2011 | Turkey A2 | 2 | (0) |

Managerial career
- 2022–2023: Pendikspor (assistant)
- 2023–2025: Eyüpspor (assistant)
- 2025–2026: Pendikspor
- 2026: Çorum
- 2026–: Alanyaspor
- * Club domestic league appearances and goals

Uğur Uçar (born 5 April 1987) is a Turkish football coach and former professional player, who played as a right back, who is the head coach of Süper Lig club Alanyaspor.

== Career ==
Uçar is a product of the Galatasaray youth system. He made his first team debut on 7 March 2004 against Adanaspor. He spent the 2006–07 season on loan at Kayserispor, playing in 22 matches. Upon his return to Galatasaray in 2007, Uçar became the first choice right back, playing in 26 matches before injuring his right knee in a match against Konyaspor on 18 February 2008. The injury kept him from competitive play for 15 months, making his return on 30 May 2009 against Sivasspor. Uçar played in 20 matches the following season.

He was transferred to Ankaragücü for a fee of €1.3 million on 23 June 2010.

== Career statistics ==
As of 26 December 2011

=== Club ===
| Club | Season | League | | Cup | | Super Cup | | Europe | | Total | |
| Club | Season | Apps | Goals | Apps | Goals | Apps | Goals | Apps | Goals | Apps | Goals |
|---|---|---|---|---|---|---|---|---|---|---|---|
| Galatasaray | 2003–04 | 1 | 0 | 0 | 0 | 0 | 0 | 0 | 0 | 1 | 0 |
| Galatasaray | 2004–05 | 6 | 0 | 4 | 0 | 0 | 0 | 0 | 0 | 10 | 0 |
| Galatasaray | 2005–06 | 17 | 0 | 2 | 1 | 0 | 0 | 0 | 0 | 19 | 1 |
| Galatasaray | Total | 24 | 0 | 6 | 1 | 0 | 0 | 0 | 0 | 30 | 1 |
| Kayserispor | 2006–07 | 22 | 0 | 5 | 0 | 0 | 0 | 0 | 0 | 27 | 0 |
| Galatasaray | 2007–08 | 21 | 0 | 4 | 0 | 0 | 0 | 0 | 0 | 25 | 0 |
| Galatasaray | 2008–09 | 1 | 0 | 0 | 0 | 0 | 0 | 0 | 0 | 1 | 0 |
| Galatasaray | 2009–10 | 14 | 0 | 6 | 0 | 0 | 0 | 0 | 0 | 20 | 0 |
| Galatasaray | Total | 36 | 0 | 10 | 0 | 0 | 0 | 0 | 0 | 46 | 0 |
| MKE Ankaragücü | 2010–11 | 25 | 0 | 4 | 0 | 0 | 0 | 0 | 0 | 29 | 0 |
| MKE Ankaragücü | 2011–12 | 8 | 0 | 0 | 0 | 0 | 0 | 0 | 0 | 8 | 0 |
| MKE Ankaragücü | Total | 33 | 0 | 4 | 0 | 0 | 0 | 0 | 0 | 37 | 0 |
| Career total | | 115 | 0 | 25 | 1 | 0 | 0 | 0 | 0 | 140 | 1 |

== Honours ==
Galatasaray

- Süper Lig: 2005-06, 2007–08
- Turkish Super Cup: 2008

İstanbul Başakşehir

- Süper Lig: 2019–20
