= Doctor Cecilio Báez =

- Location within Paraguay
- Coordinates: 25°3′0″S 56°19′12″W
- Country: Paraguay
- Department: Caaguazú

Population (2008)
  - Total: 2 131

Doctor Cecilio Báez is a town in the Caaguazú department of Paraguay.

It is named after the eponymous President of Paraguay.

== Sources ==
- World Gazeteer: Paraguay – World-Gazetteer.com
