= Aydın Toscalı =

Turkish association football player

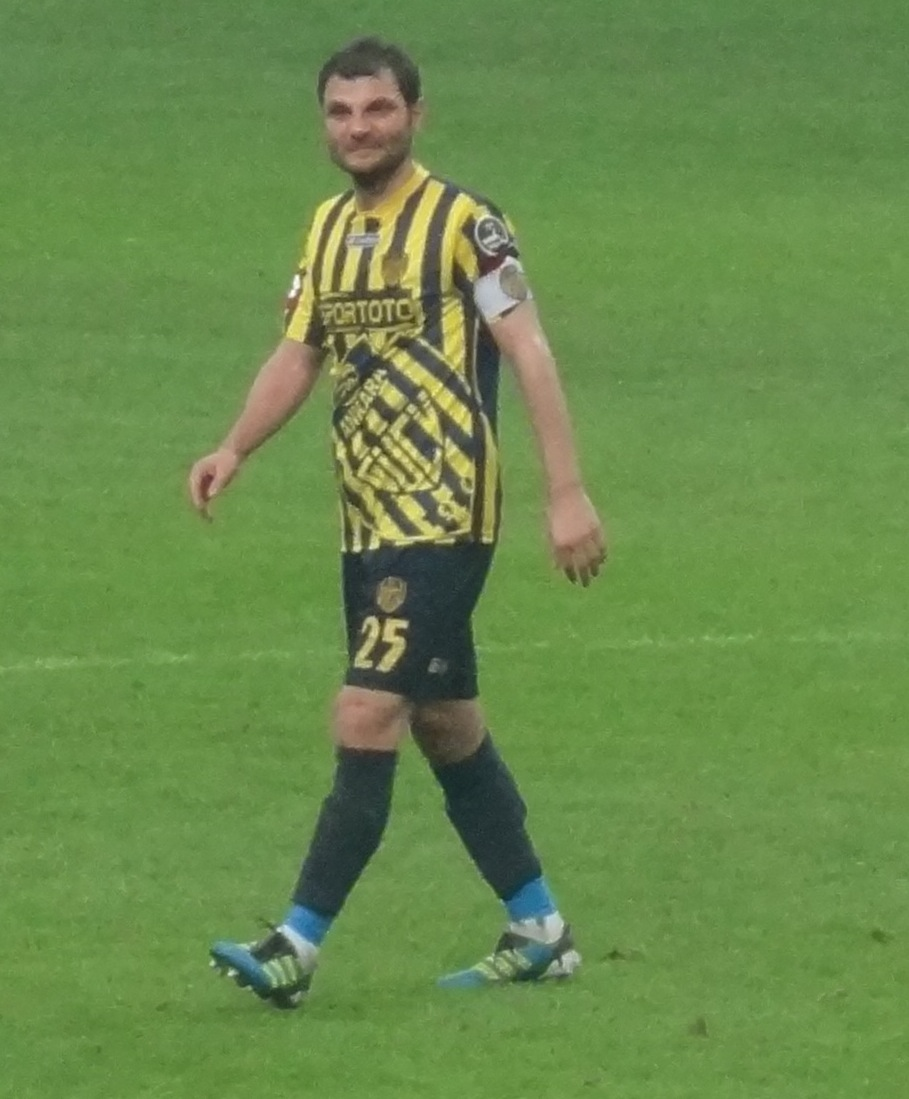

Personal information
- Date of birth: 14 August 1980 (age 46)
- Place of birth: Aydın, Turkey
- Height: 1.84 m (6 ft 0 in)
- Position: Centre-back

Youth career
- 1997–1999: Nazilli Belediyespor
- 1999–2001: Aydın Belediyespor

Senior career*
Years	Team	Apps	(Gls)
2001–2002	Muğlaspor	36	(1)
2002–2005	Tarsus İdman Yurdu	84	(5)
2005–2010	Kayserispor	124	(3)
2010–2012	Ankaragücü	49	(0)
2012–2013	Mersin İdmanyurdu	10	(0)
2013–2014	Ankaragücü	9	(0)
Total		312	(9)

International career
2007	Turkey	1	(0)
- * Club domestic league appearances and goals

Aydın Toscalı (born 14 August 1980) is a Turkish former professional footballer who played as a centre-back. He has made one appearance for the Turkey national football team.

== Honours ==
Kayserispor

- Turkish Cup: 2007–08
