= Serhat Sağat =

Turkish footballer

Personal information
- Date of birth: 13 February 1983 (age 43)
- Place of birth: Turkey
- Height: 1.80 m (5 ft 11 in)
- Position: Midfielder

Youth career
- 1996–1999: Kullar Yıldızspor
- 1999–2002: Kocaelispor

Senior career*
Years	Team	Apps	(Gls)
2002–2008	Kocaelispor		
2008–2009	Sakaryaspor	11	(0)
2009–2010	Körfez		
2010–2011	Tokatspor	12	(2)
2011	Karşıyaka	7	(0)
2011–2012	Iskenderun DC	26	(8)
2012–2013	Bugsas Spor	19	(1)
2013	Gaziosmanpaşaspor	12	(0)
2014	Kırklarelispor	3	(0)
2014	TKİ Tavşanlı Linyitspor	7	(0)
2015–2016	Körfez B.H.Y.		
2016	Sivrikaya Sinerji S.K.		
- * Club domestic league appearances and goals

Serhat Sağat (born 13 February 1983) is a Turkish former professional footballer, who played as a midfielder. He made more than 100 appearances as a product of the Kocaelispor and he was part of the team that won the TFF 1.Lig title in the 2007-08 season. Sağat represented Turkish clubs Sakaryaspor and Karsiyaka before he retired in 2016.
