= Erkan Sekman =

Turkish professional footballer (born 1984)

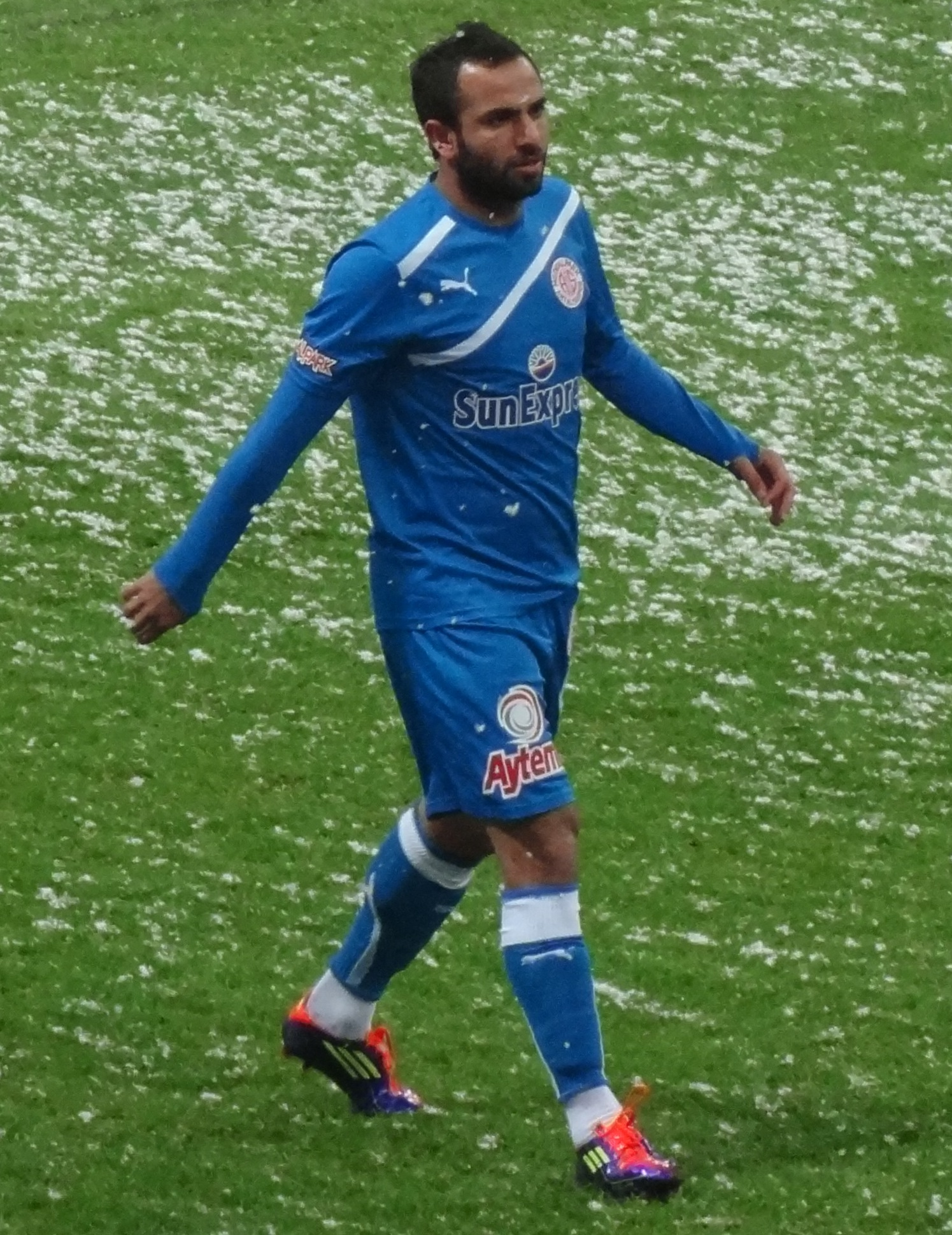

Personal information
- Full name: Erkan Sekman
- Date of birth: April 17, 1984 (age 42)
- Place of birth: Pütürge, Malatya Province, Turkey
- Height: 1.75 m (5 ft 9 in)
- Positions: Right back; centre back

Team information
- Current team: Yeni Malatyaspor

Youth career
- 1997–1999: Beştelsiz
- 1999–2001: Doğan Güneşspor
- 2001–2003: Beşiktaş

Senior career*
Years	Team	Apps	(Gls)
2003–2006	Beşiktaş	0	(0)
2004–2006	→ Fatih Karagümrük (loan)	52	(1)
2006–2008	Konyaspor	51	(2)
2008–2010	Gaziantepspor	28	(2)
2010	Denizlispor	7	(0)
2010–2012	Antalyaspor	35	(1)
2012–2013	Konyaspor	7	(0)
2013–2015	Orduspor	41	(0)
2015–2016	Göztepe	16	(1)
2016–	Yeni Malatyaspor		
- * Club domestic league appearances and goals as of 17 September 2015

Erkan Sekman (born 17 April 1984 in Pütürge, Malatya Province) is a Turkish professional footballer who currently plays as a defender for Yeni Malatyaspor.

== Club career ==
Sekman began his Beştelsiz in 1997. He moved to Doğan Güneşspor in 1999, and was transferred to Beşiktaş in 2001. He was promoted to the senior team in 2003. The club sent him on loan to Fatih Karagümrük for two straight seasons. He was →then transferred to Konyaspor in 2006. He has also played for Gaziantepspor (2008–2010) and Denizlispor (2010).
