= Hakan Aslantaş =

Turkish footballer (born 1985)

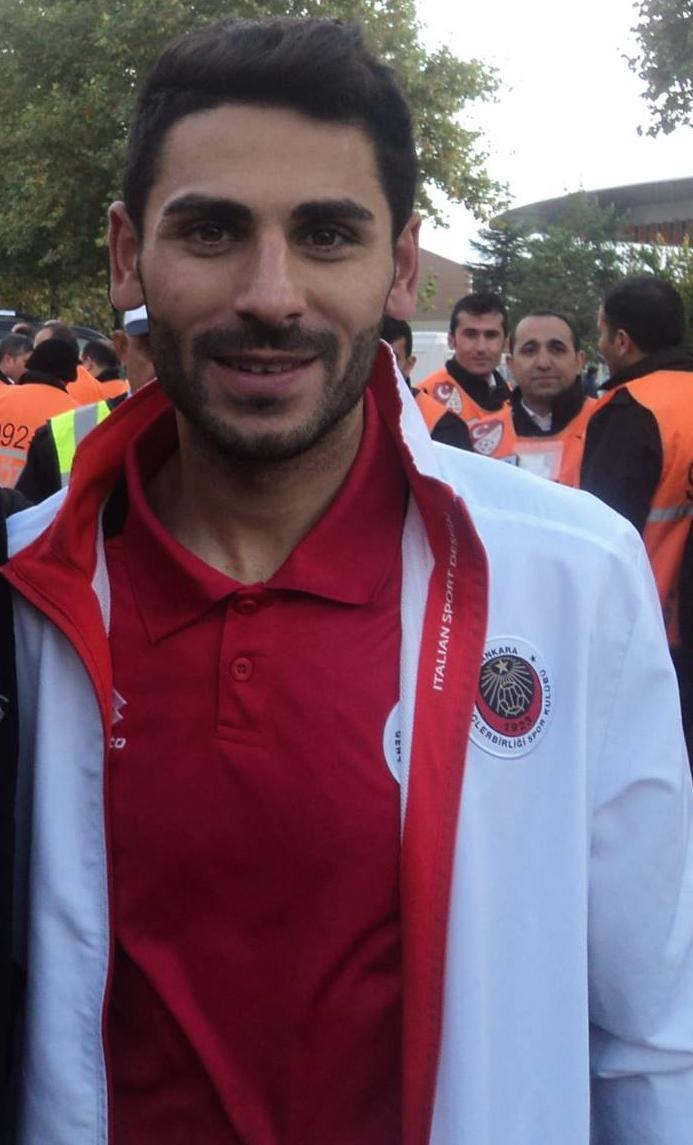

Personal information
- Date of birth: 26 August 1985 (age 41)
- Place of birth: Nürtingen, West Germany
- Height: 1.81 m (5 ft 11 in)
- Position: Right back

Team information
- Current team: Iğdır FK
- Number: 38

Youth career
- 1999–2004: VfB Stuttgart

Senior career*
| Years | Team | Apps | (Gls) |
| 2004–2009 | Gençlerbirliği | 46 | (1) |
| 2005–2006 | → Malatyaspor (loan) | 2 | (0) |
| 2007–2008 | → Hacettepe (loan) | 27 | (1) |
| 2009–2010 | Kayserispor | 18 | (0) |
| 2010–2012 | Konyaspor | 46 | (1) |
| 2012–2014 | Bursaspor | 17 | (0) |
| 2014–2015 | Gençlerbirliği | 49 | (0) |
| 2015–2016 | Osmanlıspor | 11 | (0) |
| 2016 | Gençlerbirliği | 8 | (0) |
| 2016–2018 | Karabükspor | 25 | (0) |
| 2017 | → Kayserispor (loan) | 16 | (0) |
| 2018 | Eskişehirspor | 0 | (0) |
| 2018–2019 | 1. CfR Pforzheim | 11 | (0) |
| 2019 | Eskişehirspor | 19 | (0) |
| 2020 | SV Fellbach | 3 | (0) |
| 2020 | VfL Kirchheim | 2 | (1) |
| 2020–2021 | Sakaryaspor | 27 | (0) |
| 2021–2022 | Iğdır FK | 1 | (0) |

International career
| 2002 | Turkey U18 | 2 | (0) |
| 2003–2004 | Turkey U19 | 17 | (1) |
| 2004–2005 | Turkey U19 | 6 | (0) |
- * Club domestic league appearances and goals as of 15:35, 5 September 2021 (UTC)

Hakan Aslantaş (born 26 August 1985 in Nürtingen, Germany) is a former Turkish footballer.
