= Bayram Olgun =

Turkish footballer

Personal information
- Date of birth: 26 April 1990 (age 36)
- Place of birth: Van, Turkey
- Height: 1.85 m (6 ft 1 in)
- Position: Goalkeeper

Youth career
- Antalyaspor
- –2007: Antalya Yolspor
- 2007–2010: Ankaragücü

Senior career*
Years	Team	Apps	(Gls)
2010–2014	Ankaragücü	51	(0)
2010	→ Bugsaşspor (loan)	3	(0)
2014–2016	Manisaspor	61	(0)
2016–2018	Menemen Belediyespor	50	(0)
2018–2020	Tuzlaspor	56	(0)
2020–2021	Kocaelispor	34	(0)
2021	Afjet Afyonspor	15	(0)
2022	Iğdır	18	(0)
2022–2024	Çorum	14	(0)
2024–2025	Bucaspor 1928	18	(0)

International career
2009	Turkey U19	3	(0)
2011	Turkey U21	1	(0)
- * Club domestic league appearances and goals as of 3 May 2025

Bayram Olgun (born 26 April 1990) is a Turkish professional footballer who plays as a goalkeeper.

== Life and career ==
Olgun began his career by signing a youth contract with Ankaragücü in 2007. He was loaned to Bugsaş Spor on 20 January 2010, and made his professional debut against Pursaklarspor in a TFF Second League match on 25 April 2010.
