= Metin Akan =

Turkish professional footballer

Personal information
- Date of birth: 28 May 1983 (age 43)
- Place of birth: Bursa, Turkey
- Height: 1.83 m (6 ft 0 in)
- Positions: Attacking midfielder; forward

Team information
- Current team: Bursa Zaferspor

Youth career
- 1999: A. Vefikpaşaspor
- 1999–2001: K. Kooperatifspor
- 2001–2004: Bursaspor

Senior career*
Years	Team	Apps	(Gls)
2001–2004	Bursaspor	13	(1)
2004–2006	İnegölspor	67	(32)
2006–2008	Manisaspor	65	(6)
2008–2011	MKE Ankaragücü	47	(6)
2011–2012	İstanbul B.B.	13	(0)
2012–2013	Adanaspor	7	(0)
2013–2014	İnegölspor	10	(0)
2014–2015	Tepecikspor	11	(2)
2015–2016	İnegöl Kurtuluş		
2016–	Bursa Zaferspor	8	(7)

International career
2003	Turkey U20	4	(0)
- * Club domestic league appearances and goals as of 25 November 2016

Metin Akan (born 28 May 1983 in Bursa, Turkey) is a Turkish professional footballer who plays for Bursa Zaferspor.

== Club career ==
Akan began his career with the local clubs A. Vefikpaşaspor and K. Kooperatifspor. He joined Bursaspor in 2001, where he played until 2004. Akan moved to another Bursa-based club, İnegölspor, on 24 August 2004. Manisaspor transferred him in 2006, and he joined his current club MKE Ankaragücü in 2008.
