= Jan Rajnoch =

Czech former professional footballer (born 1981)

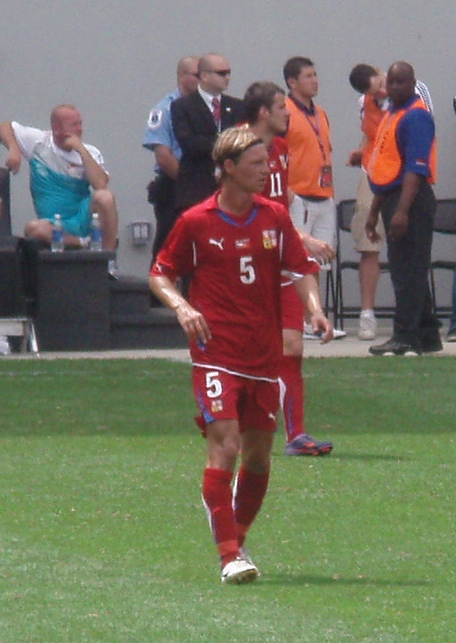
- Rajnoch in 2010

Personal information
- Date of birth: 30 September 1981 (age 45)
- Place of birth: Frýdlant, Czechoslovakia
- Height: 1.86 m (6 ft 1 in)
- Positions: Centre-back; defensive midfielder

Youth career
- 1991–2001: Sparta Prague

Senior career*
Years	Team	Apps	(Gls)
2001–2002	Sparta Prague	0	(0)
2001–2002	→ Mladá Boleslav (loan)	19	(2)
2002	→ SC Xaverov (loan)	3	(0)
2003–2004	FC Bohemians Prague	25	(9)
2004–2006	1. FC Slovácko	76	(3)
2006–2010	Mladá Boleslav	82	(19)
2009	→ Energie Cottbus (loan)	10	(0)
2010–2011	Ankaragücü	54	(5)
2012–2013	Sivasspor	40	(4)
2013–2014	Adana Demirspor	16	(2)
2014	Slovan Liberec	13	(1)
2014–2016	Sigma Olomouc	14	(0)
Total		352	(45)

International career
2008–2011	Czech Republic	15	(0)
- * Club domestic league appearances and goals

Jan Rajnoch (born 30 September 1981) is a Czech former professional footballer who played as a centre-back or defensive midfielder.

== Club career ==
Rajnoch's career started at AC Sparta Prague's youth academy, playing with prominent Czech talents Tomáš Hübschman and Tomáš Jun. However, he never made an appearance for the senior team. After spells at Bohemians Praha and 1. FC Slovácko he joined Czech Gambrinus liga outfit FK Mladá Boleslav in September 2006. Here he quickly established himself as a key player and became an integral part of the team, playing an important role in their UEFA Cup campaign wins against Olympique de Marseille and Palermo. In the 2007–08 season, he was made captain.

=== Switch to Germany ===
On 7 January 2009, Rajnoch made a loan move to German side FC Energie Cottbus where he played out the rest of the season making 10 appearances in the Bundesliga. However Cottbus could not avoid relegation and Rajnoch returned to Boleslav.

=== Turkey ===
Rajnoch moved to Turkish Süper Lig outfit MKE Ankaragücü in 2010 on a three-and-a-half-year contract. He scored an own goal against Galatasaray on 2 October 2011 which became Galatasaray's 3000th goal in league history.

== International career ==
Rajnoch played for the Czech Republic national team. He made his international debut on 20 August 2008 in a friendly against England at Wembley Stadium where he came on as a substitute for Radoslav Kováč in the 76th minute. The game ended in a 2–2 draw.

== Style of play ==
He played as a defender or sometimes as a defensive midfielder.
