= Özgür Çek =

Turkish footballer

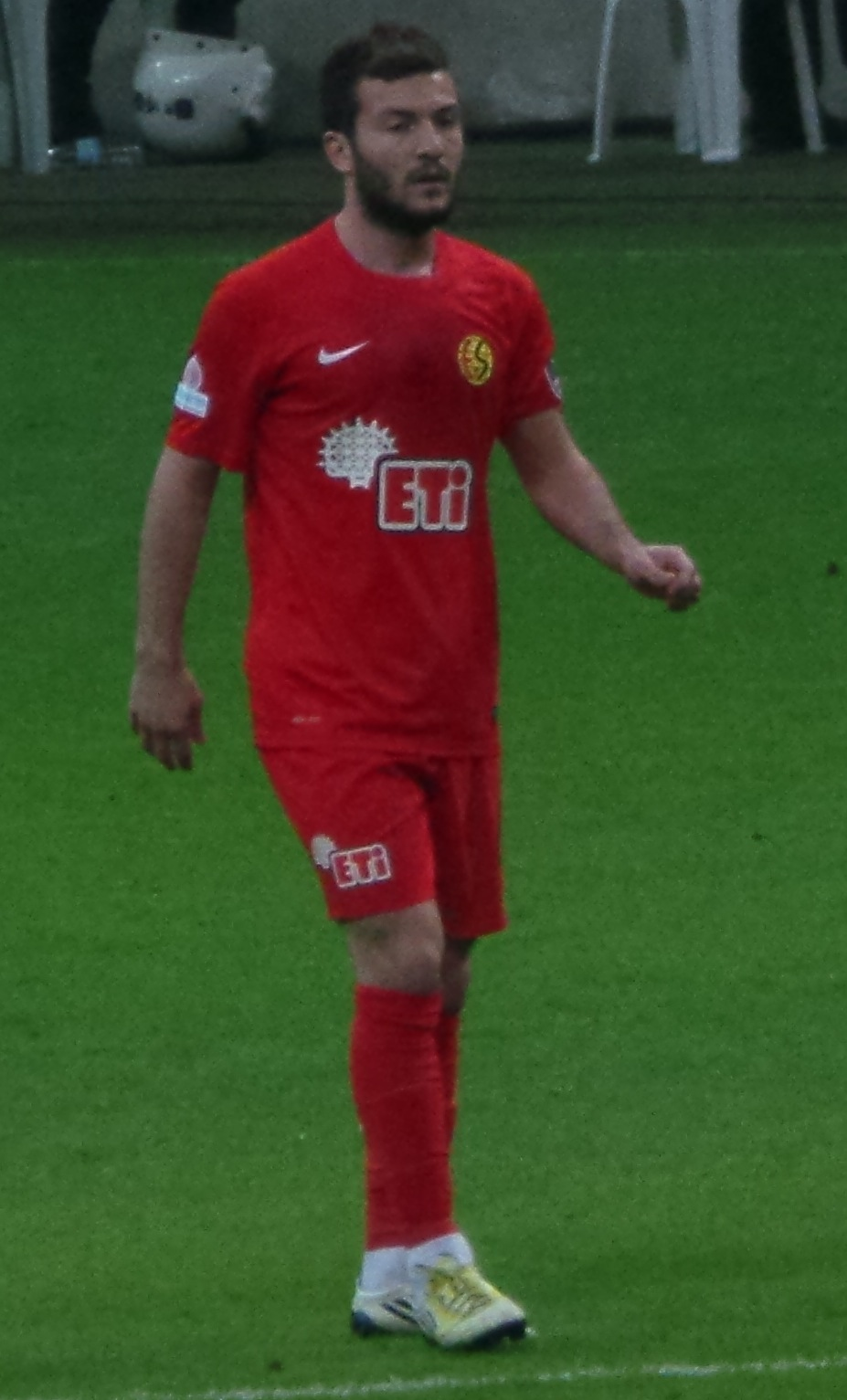

Personal information
- Date of birth: 3 January 1991 (age 35)
- Place of birth: Erbaa, Turkey
- Height: 1.74 m (5 ft 9 in)
- Positions: Left back; winger

Youth career
- 2002–2004: Maltepespor
- 2004–2006: Pendikspor
- 2006–2009: Fenerbahçe

Senior career*
Years	Team	Apps	(Gls)
2009	Ankaraspor	1	(0)
2009–2010	→ MKE Ankaragücü (loan)	1	(0)
2010–2012	MKE Ankaragücü	37	(6)
2012–2013	Fenerbahçe	4	(0)
2013–2015	Eskişehirspor	62	(4)
2016	Alanyaspor	13	(0)
2016–2018	Çaykur Rizespor	39	(6)
2018–2020	Kasımpaşa	25	(0)
2020–2021	Denizlispor	21	(0)
2021–2023	Manisa FK	20	(0)
2023–2024	Gençlerbirliği	21	(0)
2024-2025	Tokat Belediye Plevnespor	4	(0)

International career
2007	Turkey U16	12	(0)
2007–2008	Turkey U17	14	(3)
2008–2009	Turkey U18	8	(1)
2008–2010	Turkey U19	19	(2)
2009–2012	Turkey U21	15	(2)
2012–2014	Turkey A2	7	(0)
- * Club domestic league appearances and goals

Özgür Çek (born 3 January 1991) is a Turkish professional former footballer.

== Early years ==
Özgür Çek began his footballing at a Fenerbahçe school in Istanbul. In 2002, he moved to local club Maltepespor due to its proximity to his residence. He was transferred to Pendikspor in 2004, with club scouts having been impressed with his talent. Özgür Çek was persuaded by the club's training facilities and former players who had gone through the youth system at Pendikspor. His dream was to eventually move to one of Istanbul's "big three" clubs: Beşiktaş, Fenerbahçe and Galatasaray. Özgür Çek later received offers from all three clubs in 2006, choosing Fenerbahçe in the end. In an interview, Özgür Çek remarked that he knew it was very hard for youth players to break through into the first team at Fenerbahçe, but stated that his biggest dream was to play for the club.

== Club career ==
Fenerbahçe signed him to his first professional contract on 1 July 2006. However, he did not make any league appearances for the club, and was later sent to Ankaraspor as part of the deal that brought Özer Hurmacı to Fenerbahçe. His professional debut came against Gaziantepspor on 23 August 2009. Özgür Çek's career with the club didn't last long, as they were expelled from the league because of its relationship with MKE Ankaragücü, ruling that it was contrary to sporting competitiveness" (see 2009–10 in Turkish football). As a result, Özgür Çek was loaned out to MKE Ankaragücü for the rest of the season. His deal was made permanent at the end of the year, Ankaraspor having ceased operations, signing a five-year deal with MKE Ankaragücü. Özgür Çek has been a regular fixture in the side for the 2010–11 season, starting the first seven matches while scoring two goals.

=== Eskişehirspor ===
Özgür Çek signed a 3.5 year contract with Eskişehirspor on 5 January 2013.

=== Gençlerbirliği ===
On 12 January 2023, Çek joined Gençlerbirliği on a one-and-a-half-year-deal.
