= Ergün Teber =

Turkish footballer

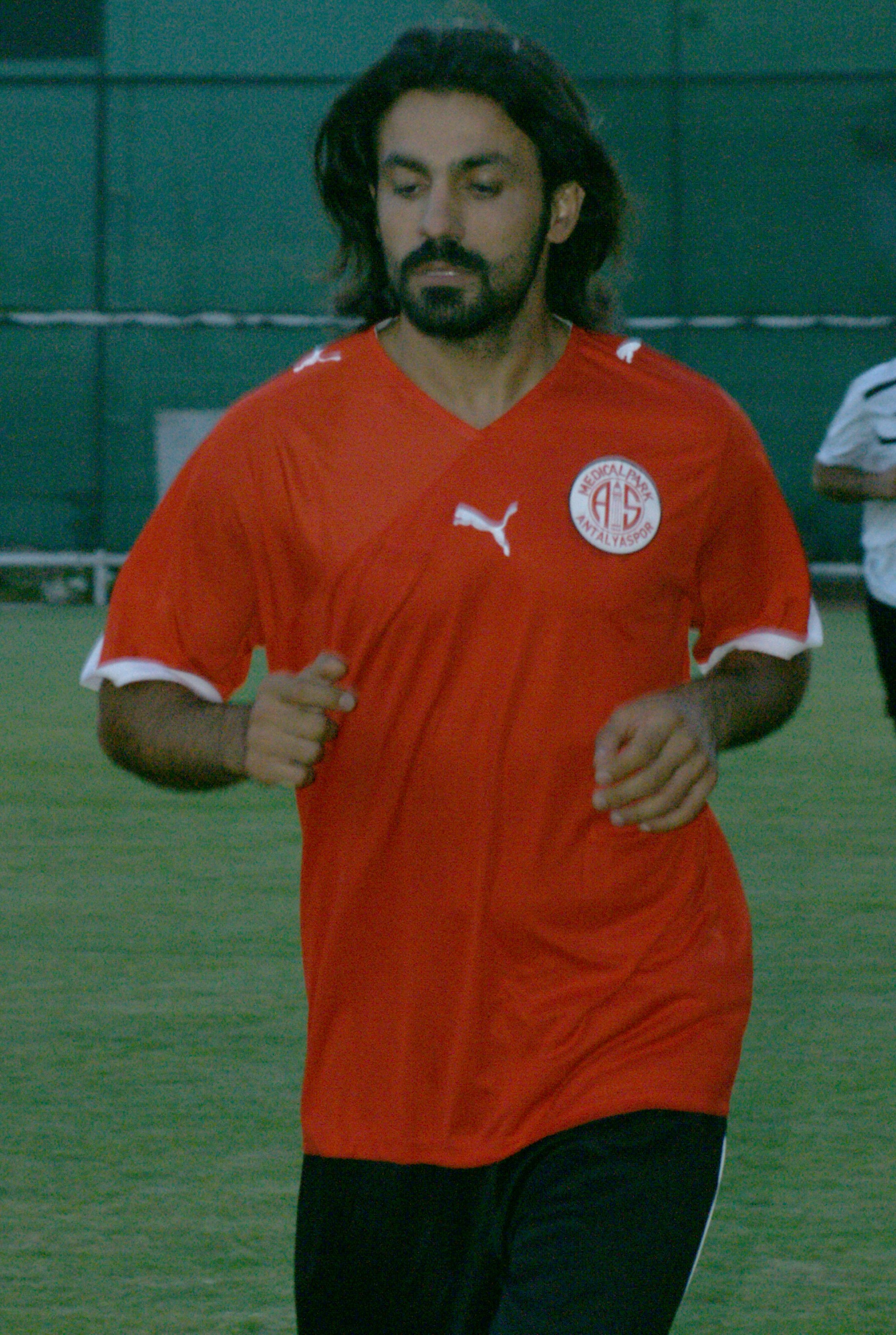
- Teber with Antalyaspor

Personal information
- Date of birth: September 1, 1985 (age 41)
- Place of birth: Adana, Turkey
- Height: 1.81 m (5 ft 11 in)
- Position: Defender

Team information
- Current team: Karabükspor
- Number: 15

Senior career*
| Years | Team | Apps | (Gls) |
| 1999–2005 | Kayseri Erciyesspor | 28 | (0) |
| 2005–2006 | Kayserispor | 46 | (1) |
| 2006–2007 | → Sakaryaspor (loan) | 13 | (0) |
| 2007 | Kayseri Erciyesspor | 14 | (0) |
| 2007–2008 | Çaykur Rizespor | 15 | (0) |
| 2008–2009 | Gençlerbirliği | 21 | (0) |
| 2009 | → Kocaelispor (loan) | 10 | (0) |
| 2009–2011 | Kasımpaşa S.K. | 48 | (0) |
| 2011–2012 | Samsunspor | 15 | (1) |
| 2012 | Gençlerbirliği | 12 | (0) |
| 2012–2013 | Antalyaspor | 26 | (0) |
| 2013–2014 | Konyaspor | 19 | (0) |
| 2014–2015 | Eskişehirspor | 19 | (0) |
| 2015– | Karabükspor | 0 | (0) |

International career^{‡}
| 1999–2000 | Turkey U15 | 4 | (0) |
| 2002 | Turkey U18 | 5 | (0) |
| 2003–2004 | Turkey U19 | 31 | (1) |
| 2004–2005 | Turkey U20 | 10 | (0) |
| 2005–2006 | Turkey U21 | 8 | (0) |
- * Club domestic league appearances and goals as of 30 June 2013 ‡ National team caps and goals as of 1 June 2015

Ergün Teber (born 9 September 1985 in Adana, Turkey) is a Turkish football who currently plays for Kardemir Karabükspor as a left back.
