= Kerem Şeras =

Turkish footballer

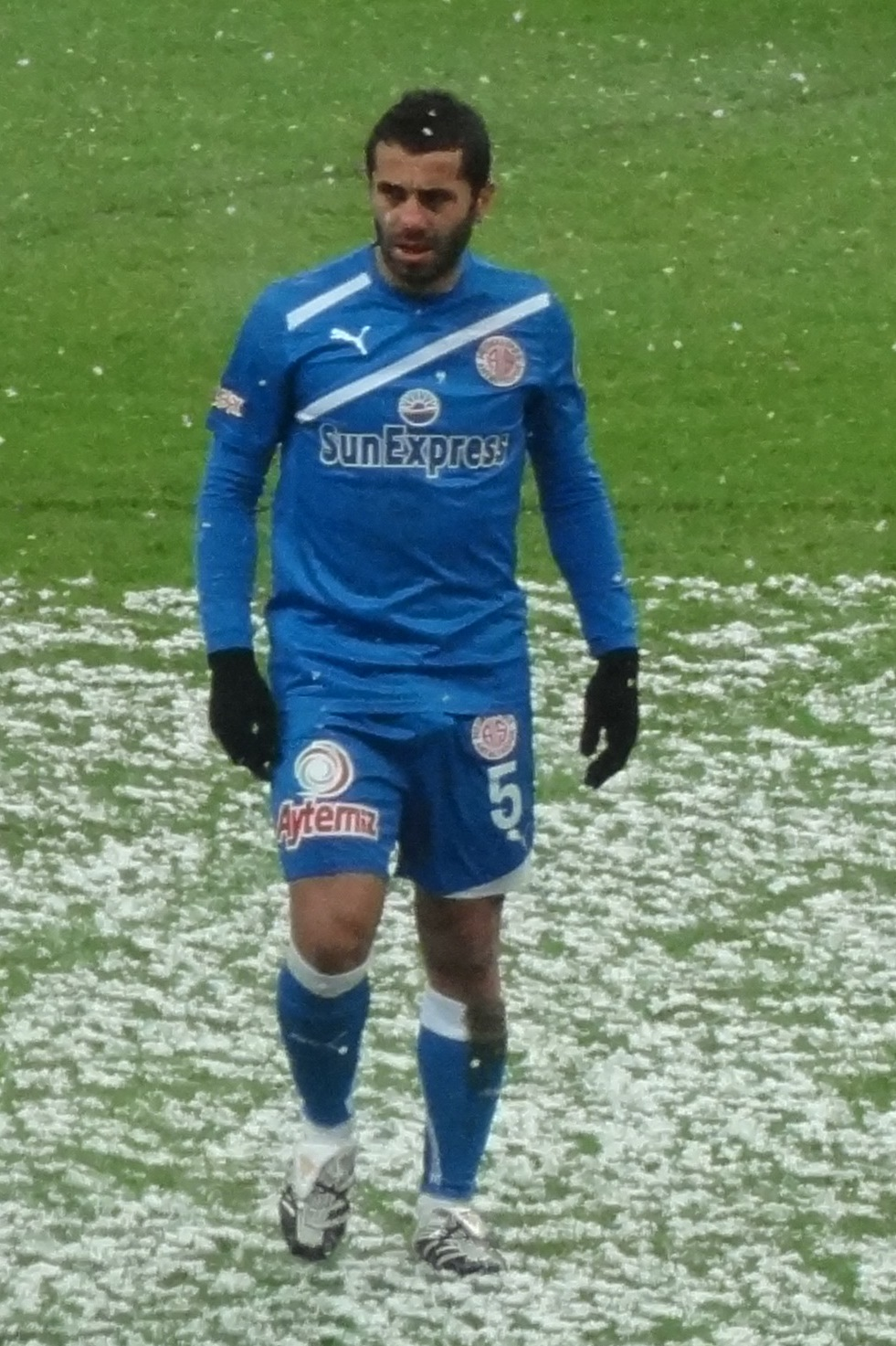

Personal information
- Date of birth: 1 January 1984 (age 42)
- Place of birth: Ankara, Turkey
- Height: 1.75 m (5 ft 9 in)
- Position: Defensive midfielder

Youth career
- 1999–2002: Gençlerbirliği

Senior career*
Years	Team	Apps	(Gls)
2002–2003	Hacettepe	23	(0)
2003–2010	Gençlerbirliği	127	(2)
2008–2009	→ Hacettepe (loan)	14	(3)
2009–2010	→ Ankaragücü (loan)	14	(0)
2010–2012	Antalyaspor	52	(5)
2012–2016	Kasımpaşa	63	(1)
2015	→ Osmanlıspor (loan)	15	(1)
2016	Göztepe	13	(1)
2017	Kastamonuspor	19	(0)
2017–2018	Bugsaşspor	14	(0)
2018	Tuzlaspor	12	(1)
2018–2020	Başkent Şafakspor	47	(0)

International career^{‡}
2005–2006	Turkey U21	5	(0)
- * Club domestic league appearances and goals ‡ National team caps and goals as of 13 January 2018

Kerem Şeras (born 1 January 1984) is a Turkish football player. He plays as midfielder.
