= Mehmet Çakır =

Turkish footballer

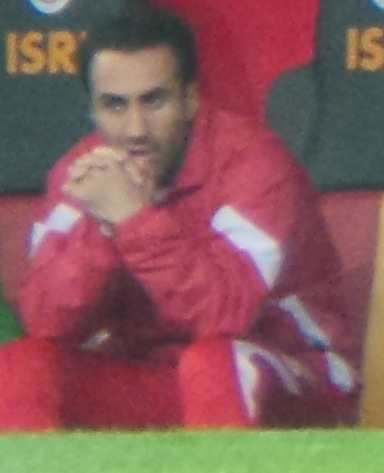

Personal information
- Full name: Mehmet Çakır
- Date of birth: 4 January 1984 (age 42)
- Place of birth: Bala, Ankara, Turkey
- Height: 1.79 m (5 ft 10 1/2 in)
- Position: Attacking midfielder

Team information
- Current team: Tuzlaspor
- Number: 55

Senior career*
Years	Team	Apps	(Gls)
2002–2003	Etimesgut Şekerspor	4	(1)
2003–2005	Gençlerbirliği OFTAŞ	59	(18)
2005–2008	Gençlerbirliği	98	(25)
2008–2010	Ankaraspor	33	(10)
2009–2010	→ Ankaragücü (loan)	22	(1)
2010	Ankaragücü	7	(1)
2011	Trabzonspor	2	(0)
2011–2012	Karabükspor	13	(1)
2013	Elazığspor	13	(1)
2013–2014	Ankaragücü	32	(6)
2014–2015	Elazığspor	28	(9)
2015–2017	Samsunspor	39	(6)
2017	Kastamonuspor	17	(6)
2017–2018	Bugsaşspor	6	(0)
2018–	Tuzlaspor	3	(2)

International career
2005	Turkey U-21	11	(1)
- * Club domestic league appearances and goals as of 5 February 2018

Mehmet Çakır (born 4 January 1984 in Bala, Ankara) is a Turkish professional footballer. He currently plays as an attacking midfielder for Tuzlaspor.

== Biography ==
In September 2011 he was sold to Kardemir Karabükspor for Turkish lira 400,000.
