= Mehmet Nas =

Turkish footballer

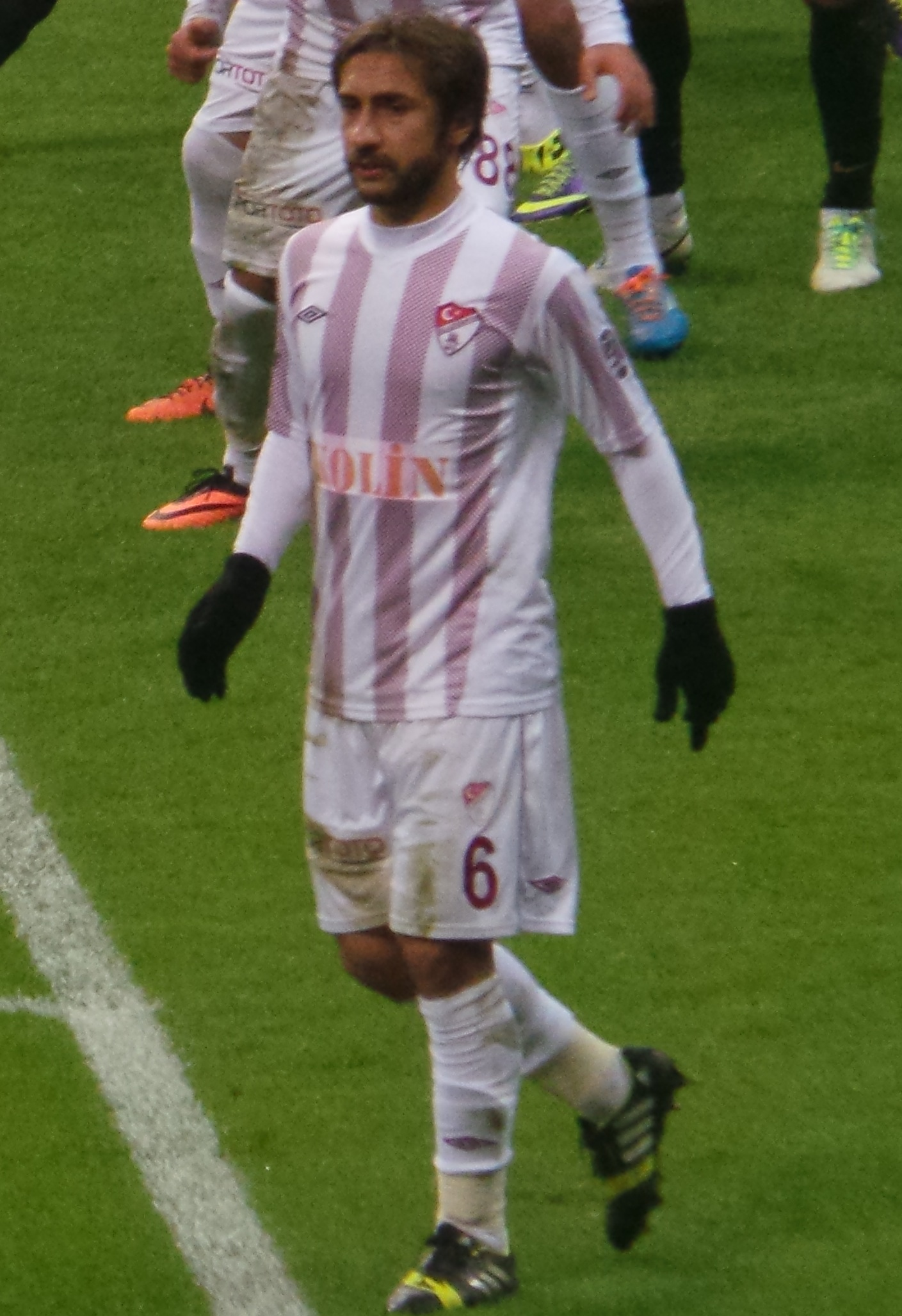

Personal information
- Date of birth: November 20, 1979 (age 46)
- Place of birth: Kelkit, Turkey
- Height: 1.69 m (5 ft 6 1/2 in)
- Position: Central midfielder

Team information
- Current team: Sivas Belediyespor

Youth career
- Samsunspor

Senior career*
Years	Team	Apps	(Gls)
1998–2004	Samsunspor	192	(4)
2004–2009	Gençlerbirliği	132	(8)
2009–2010	Manisaspor	15	(3)
2010–2013	Sivasspor	80	(5)
2013–2014	Elazığspor	24	(0)
2014–2015	Gaziantep BB	16	(1)
2015–2016	Sivas Belediyespor	24	(0)

International career
1998–2001	Turkey U21	22	(0)
- * Club domestic league appearances and goals as of 20 December 2015

Mehmet Nas (born 20 November 1979) is a former Turkish professional footballer, who played last as a midfielder for Sivas Belediyespor.

== Club career ==
Nas began his professional career in 1998. He spent six years with Samsunspor before he moved on to capital club Gençlerbirliği in 2004. After making 132 appearances and scoring six goals for the Ankara-based club, he moved to Manisaspor in 2009. He spent one season at the club before moving to Sivasspor in 2010.

== International career ==
Nas was first called up to the Turkey national under-21 football team in 1998. He made 22 appearances for the team between 1998 and 2001.

== See also ==
- Mehmet Nas: "Futbolcu olmasaydım lokantacı olacaktım" (in Turkish) – An extensive interview with the Turkish Football Federation website.
