= Kayserispor =

Turkish football club

- Full name: Kayserispor Futbol A.Ş.
- Nickname: Anadolu Yıldızı (Anatolian Star)
- Founded: 1 July 1966; 60 years ago
- Stadium: Kadir Has Stadium
- Capacity: 31,856
- Coordinates: 38°44′14″N 35°25′23″E
- President: Ali Çamlı
- Head coach: Atila Gerin
- League: TFF 1. Lig
- 2025–26: Süper Lig, 17th of 18 (relegated)
- Website: kayserispor.org.tr
Home colours	Away colours	Third colours

Kayserispor Kulübü, commonly known as Kayserispor, is a Turkish professional football club based in the city of Kayseri. Founded on 1 July 1966, the club currently competes in the TFF 1. Lig, the second tier of Turkish football. Kayserispor plays its home matches at the Kadir Has Stadium, which has a capacity of 31,856 all-seated spectators. The club's official colours are red and yellow.

Kayserispor has enjoyed domestic and international success over its history. The club won its first major trophy by claiming the Turkish Cup in 2008, defeating Gençlerbirliği in the final on penalties. That same year, they also finished as runners-up in the Turkish Super Cup. The team's best league finishes have been fifth place in four separate seasons: 2005–06, 2006–07, 2007–08, and 2012–13.

Kayserispor made its European debut in the 2006 UEFA Intertoto Cup, and became one of the eleven co-winners, which granted them a spot in the UEFA Cup. Their most notable European fixtures included ties against AZ Alkmaar in 2006 and Paris Saint-Germain in 2008.

== History ==
=== Origins and first years ===
Football in Kayseri had several amateur clubs by the 1930s; among them Erciyes Gençlik (est. 1937) and Erciyesspor are repeatedly mentioned in local historical publications.

In the mid-1960s, Orhan Şeref Apak's Turkish Football Federation (TFF) policy aimed to spread professional football to Anatolia and organise a nationwide second tier. Following local meetings in Kayseri, representatives agreed to merge Erciyesspor, Sanayispor and Ortaanadoluspor under the Kayserispor name. The club held its general assembly and was officially founded on 1 July 1966.

Kayserispor entered the newly created 2.Lig in 1966–67. The first manager was Erdoğan Gürhan. Contemporary retrospectives record that the first official match was played in Kayseri against Ankara Toprakspor, with Yener Kurgil scoring in the 17th minute—considered the first goal in club history. Kayserispor finished its debut season 10th in the 2.Lig (Beyaz Grup), with a 9W–9D–12L record.

Following the late-1980s restructure, the police-affiliated side in the city competed as Kayseri Emniyetspor. After the General Directorate of Security moved to withdraw police teams from national leagues, a civilian board took over and the club adopted the Kayseri Erciyesspor name.

Across the 1990s the team operated under municipal ownership with successive name changes documented in federation records: Büyükşehir Belediye Erciyesspor (1992–96), Melikgazi Belediyesi Erciyesspor (1997–99) and Hacılar Erciyesspor (1999–2001). Hacılar Erciyesspor won Group 3 of the 3. Lig in 1999–2000 and moved up to the 2. Lig. They later secured promotion positions from the 2003–04 2. Lig (Category A), earning a place in the top flight.

On 9 July 2004, a general assembly in Kayseri approved the switch of name, badge and colors: the promoted Erciyesspor took the Kayserispor identity, while the other side continued as Kayseri Erciyesspor. Early in that first season, manager Hüsnü Özkara departed after seven league matches and Hikmet Karaman took over; the team avoided relegation with a 14th-place finish.

2008 Turkish Cup Final starting lineup

=== European debut and first major trophy ===
Under Ertuğrul Sağlam, Kayserispor finished fifth in the 2005–06 Süper Lig, while striker Gökhan Ünal won the league's top-scorer award with 25 goals in 32 matches.

The club entered the UEFA Intertoto Cup in 2006, defeating Sopron and AEL to become one of the competition's eleven “joint winners”, which qualified them for the UEFA Cup. In the UEFA Cup they beat Tirana in the second qualifying round and were eliminated by AZ in the first round (3–4 aggregate).

Kayserispor placed fifth again in 2006–07. Sağlam then left to manage Beşiktaş in June 2007, and Tolunay Kafkas was appointed. Under Kafkas, Kayserispor earned a third straight fifth-place league finish and won the 2008 Turkish Cup, defeating Gençlerbirliği on penalties in the final.

Robert Prosinečki was appointed head coach on 15 October 2012; Kayserispor finished fifth in 2012–13 before being relegated the following season. Kayserispor returned immediately as champions of the 2014–15 TFF First League, clinching the title with a 3–0 win away to Elazığspor.

=== 2019–present: New leadership and recent seasons ===
At the end of 2019, board member Berna Gözbaşı was elected club president, becoming the first woman to lead a men’s top-flight club in Turkey.

In the 2021–22 season the club introduced a light-blue third kit featuring Seljuk motifs and an “Autism Awareness” mark, presented as a community-awareness design by the club, in accordance with corporate social responsibility (CSR). The team reached the final of the 2021–22 Turkish Cup, losing 3–2 after extra time to Sivasspor at the Atatürk Olympic Stadium in Istanbul.

Following a general assembly in December 2022, Ali Çamlı became club president; he was re-elected in June 2024 and again in September 2024. On the pitch, Kayserispor finished 9th in 2022–23 and reached the Turkish Cup quarter-finals. In 2023–24 the club placed 14th.

There were several coaching changes across these seasons: Recep Uçar was appointed in September 2023, followed by Burak Yılmaz on a two-and-a-half-year contract in January 2024; Yılmaz resigned in September 2024. Sinan Kaloğlu took charge in October 2024, and in January 2025 Sergej Jakirović was appointed head coach on a 1.5-year deal. Under Jakirović, Kayserispor put together an unbeaten run in early 2025 and climbed clear of the bottom places.

Keeping the club clear of relegation at the end of the 2024–25 season, Jakirović's additional one year option contract was exercised. Days later Hull City announced him as their new head coach on a two-year deal. Kayserispor then reached a deal with German coach Markus Gisdol and completed a two-year contract following an official signing ceremony on 22 June 2025

During the start of the 2025-26, Gisdol is sacked by the club because of a poor run making it 4 draws and 4 defeats for the club, after being sacked on 7 October, Radomir Đalović has become the new manager who previously made HNK Rijeka champions of the Croatian Football League in the 2024-25 season whereas he also coached NK Maribor but shortly resigned. Erling Moe has become the new head coach as of late February 2026. The Anatolian side relegated from the Süper Lig at the end of the 2025-26 season, finishing 17th.

== Stadium ==
Prior to moving to Kadir Has Stadium in 2009, Kayserispor played at the centrally located Kayseri Atatürk Stadium (opened 1960; demolished in January 2009). The club's first European home fixtures were staged there, including the 2006–07 UEFA Cup first-round tie against AZ Alkmaar (1–1 in Kayseri) and the 2008–09 UEFA Cup first round versus Paris Saint-Germain (1–2 in Kayseri, 0–0 in Paris).

Kadir Has Stadium is a multi-purpose venue in Melikgazi, Kayseri, and the home ground of Kayserispor. It opened on 8 March 2009 with the Süper Lig match Kayserispor–Fenerbahçe. The all-seater capacity is 31,856 and the stands are fully covered. The ground forms part of the Atatürk Sports Complex on the city's western approach. The municipal description and national team match booklet note that the Kayseray light-rail corridor runs by the stadium, providing access from the city centre.

In 2022, RHG Enertürk Enerji acquired the venue's naming rights, with the stadium marketed as the RHG Enertürk Enerji Stadium till the end of the 2025-26 season. The stadium has hosted Turkey internationals, including a 4–2 win over the Estonia in a 2010 World Cup qualifier on 5 September 2009. Kayserispor's first-team and academy activities are centred at the Recep Mamur (Karpuzatan) training facilities in Kocasinan.

== Colors and crest ==
The crest shows Mount Erciyes above a two-part shield; the letters “K” and “S” sit on the red and yellow halves, and the founding year “1966” appears at the base, as specified in the club's 2024 corporate identity guide. Mount Erciyes is widely used as a symbol of Kayseri, which explains its prominence on the badge. The club's official colours are red and yellow. The corporate guide defines the palette (e.g., Pantone 187 C for red; Pantone 1235 C for yellow) and supporting crest tones (sky blue and navy for Erciyes, plus grey/black outlines).

=== Colour change with Kayseri Erciyesspor (2004–05) ===
On 9 July 2004, following Kayseri Erciyesspor’s promotion, the two city clubs held general assemblies and swapped the Süper Lig berth under the Kayserispor name. Contemporary reporting notes that the name, badge and colours were interchanged in that process. The following season, Kayseri Erciyesspor formally changed its kit colours from red–yellow to blue–black (with white as secondary), confirming the split identity thereafter.

== Rivalry ==
Kayserispor holds one of the most intense rivalries in Turkish football with Sivasspor, which began after a tragic match in 1967 that led to 43 fatalities, an event widely regarded as the worst stadium disaster in Turkish football history.

The rivalry between Kayserispor and Sivasspor stems from regional proximity, cultural identity, and longstanding competition between the cities of Kayseri and Sivas in Central Anatolia. It intensified sharply following their first professional meeting on 17 September 1967 in a Second Division (White Group) match at the Kayseri Atatürk Stadium. The game was abandoned amid serious crowd trouble; 43 people died and hundreds were injured. Turkish national outlets and the federation's record describe the day as one of Turkish football's darkest.

Contemporary reports and later research recount that tension escalated after a 20th-minute goal by Oktay Aktan for Kayserispor; stone-throwing between sections followed, fans fleeing the violence in panic caused a stampede in front of the stand exits. As the exit gates opened inward, many fans died because they were crushed and suffocated. The incident has been the subject of a dedicated book that drew on press archives and eyewitness interviews.

In the immediate aftermath, authorities halted the competition and issued disciplinary measures. Sources from the period note forfeit rulings and ground-closure sanctions, and officials in both provinces faced administrative consequences; the football authorities also avoided placing the two clubs in the same league group for years.

The rivalry remains one of central Anatolia's most charged fixtures and has also appeared on the national stage: the clubs met in the 2022 Turkish Cup final at the Atatürk Olympic Stadium, with Sivasspor winning in extra time. An annual commemoration is held in Sivas on 17 September for those who died in 1967.

== Supporters ==
Kayserispor has a supporter base primarily from the city of Kayseri and the surrounding Central Anatolia region. The club's main organized supporter group is Kapalı Kale (literally “Closed End”), founded in 2005 and named after the stand in the former Kayseri Atatürk Stadium. The group is active on matchdays and is known for displaying flags and leading chants in the stadium.

Kayserispor supporters traditionally occupy the eastern stands of the Kadir Has Stadium, where drums, megaphones, and choreographed tifos are coordinated by the main groups. In high-profile derbies, especially against Sivasspor or Kayseri Erciyesspor (when active), fan presence typically fills the entire lower tier. Kayserispor fans are known for their loyalty during difficult periods. During the 2023–24 season—despite multiple managerial changes and relegation fears—the average attendance remained over 9,000 per match.

The club and its supporters have also engaged in charitable initiatives. Kapalı Kale and other fan groups helped coordinate donations and logistics during the 2023 Turkey–Syria earthquake, using club facilities as aid centers. Kayserispor does not currently have an official fan club abroad, but diaspora communities in Germany and Netherlands have organized viewing groups and social media communities that follow the club closely.

=== Kit suppliers and shirt sponsors ===
Period	Kit manufacturer	Shirt main sponsor
2004-2005	Puma	Turkcell
2005-2010	Adidas	Turkcell
2010-2011	Adidas	Aksa
2011-2012	Adidas	Spor Toto
2012-2014	Adidas	none
2014-2015	Adidas	Ferre
2015-2017	Adidas	İstikbal
2017-2025	Nike	İstikbal
2025-	Adidas	İstikbal

=== Naming rights ===
Due to commercial sponsorship agreements, the club has operated under various names in competition. As of January 2019 the club's name was altered into İstikbal Mobilya Kayserispor . In January 2020 the club's name was revised into HES Kablo Kayserispor. As of August 2021 the name was changed into Yukatel Kayserispor. Kayserispor participated as Mondihome Kayserispor during the 2023–24 season. Bellona sponsored the club for the 2024–25 season, hence the name Bellona Kayserispor. In August 2025 former Crawley Town and Kayseri Erciyesspor chairman Ziya Eren and his enterprise sealed a one year sponsordeal, naming the club Zecorner Kayserispor. The club will be addressed as Metro Holding Kayserispor starting July 2026.

== Honours ==
=== Domestic competitions ===
- 1. Lig (second tier)
  - Winners (3): 1972–73, 1984–85, 2014–15
- 2. Lig (third tier)
  - Winners (1): 1999–00

==== Cups ====
- Turkish Cup
  - Winners (1): 2007–08
  - Runners-up (1): 2021–22
- Turkish Super Cup
  - Runners-up (1): 2008

=== European competitions ===
- UEFA Intertoto Cup
  - Winners (1): 2006 (joint winners)

== Statistics ==
=== Results of League and Cup Competitions by Season ===
Season	League table										Turkish Cup	UEFA	Top scorer	
Season	League	Pos	P	W	D	L	GF	GA	GD	Pts	Turkish Cup	UEFA	Player	Goals
1966–67	1. Lig	10th	30	9	9	12	21	23	−2	27	~~N/A.~~	DNQ	~~N/A.~~	~~N/A.~~
1967–68	1. Lig	15th	38	10	13	15	21	27	−6	32	~~N/A.~~	DNQ	~~N/A.~~	~~N/A.~~
1968–69	1. Lig	9th	34	10	14	10	32	41	−9	34	~~N/A.~~	DNQ	~~N/A.~~	~~N/A.~~
1969–70	1. Lig	7th	30	11	8	11	31	25	+6	30	~~N/A.~~	DNQ	~~N/A.~~	~~N/A.~~
1970–71	1. Lig	7th	30	13	7	10	24	18	+6	33	~~N/A.~~	DNQ	~~N/A.~~	~~N/A.~~
1971–72	1. Lig	4th	30	10	12	8	21	17	+4	32	~~N/A.~~	DNQ	~~N/A.~~	~~N/A.~~
1972–73	1. Lig	1st↑	30	14	11	5	29	13	+16	39	~~N/A.~~	DNQ	~~N/A.~~	~~N/A.~~
1973–74	Süper Lig	11th	30	8	11	11	18	24	−6	27	~~N/A.~~	DNQ	~~N/A.~~	~~N/A.~~
1974–75	Süper Lig	16th↓	30	4	12	14	15	38	−23	20	~~N/A.~~	DNQ	~~N/A.~~	~~N/A.~~
1975–76	1. Lig	2nd	30	15	5	10	40	19	+21	35	~~N/A.~~	DNQ	~~N/A.~~	~~N/A.~~
1976–77	1. Lig	2nd	32	20	8	4	51	28	+23	48	~~N/A.~~	DNQ	~~N/A.~~	~~N/A.~~
1977–78	1. Lig	5th	32	14	8	10	37	21	+16	36	~~N/A.~~	DNQ	~~N/A.~~	~~N/A.~~
1978–79	1. Lig	2nd↑	30	19	5	6	63	22	+41	43	~~N/A.~~	DNQ	~~N/A.~~	~~N/A.~~
1979–80	Süper Lig	15th↓	30	6	13	11	19	28	−9	25	~~N/A.~~	DNQ	~~N/A.~~	~~N/A.~~
1980–81	1. Lig	5th	34	15	9	10	40	26	+14	39	~~N/A.~~	DNQ	~~N/A.~~	~~N/A.~~
1981–82	1. Lig	2nd	28	20	5	3	60	17	+43	45	~~N/A.~~	DNQ	~~N/A.~~	~~N/A.~~
1982–83	1. Lig	3rd	30	14	11	5	44	19	+25	39	~~N/A.~~	DNQ	~~N/A.~~	~~N/A.~~
1983–84	1. Lig	5th	30	11	9	10	30	24	+6	31	~~N/A.~~	DNQ	~~N/A.~~	~~N/A.~~
1984–85	1. Lig	1st↑	30	16	8	6	42	29	+13	40	~~N/A.~~	DNQ	~~N/A.~~	~~N/A.~~
1985–86	Süper Lig	19th↓	36	4	11	21	27	67	−40	19	~~N/A.~~	DNQ	~~N/A.~~	~~N/A.~~
1986–87	1. Lig	3rd	32	18	6	8	52	24	+28	42	~~N/A.~~	DNQ	~~N/A.~~	~~N/A.~~
1987–88	1. Lig	7th↓	34	13	10	11	48	40	+8	49	~~N/A.~~	DNQ	~~N/A.~~	~~N/A.~~
1988–89	2. Lig	12th	34	9	11	14	38	44	−6	38	~~N/A.~~	DNQ	~~N/A.~~	~~N/A.~~
1990–91	2. Lig	9th	34	11	9	14	39	51	−12	42	R1	DNQ	~~N/A.~~	~~N/A.~~
1991–92	2. Lig	8th	34	13	7	14	50	43	+7	46	R1	DNQ	~~N/A.~~	~~N/A.~~
1992–93	2. Lig	2nd	30	18	7	5	64	37	+27	61	R1	DNQ	Mehmet Aşık	11
1993–94	2. Lig	4th	24	12	2	10	34	34	0	38	R1	DNQ	Zafer Tüzün	12
1994–95	2. Lig	7th	26	7	9	10	33	33	0	30	R2	DNQ	Recep Umut	16
1995–96	2. Lig	8th	26	9	5	12	40	44	−4	32	R2	DNQ	Temel Uğur Yiğit	10
1996–97	2. Lig	11th	34	13	4	17	46	65	−19	43	R1	DNQ	~~N/A.~~	~~N/A.~~
1997–98	2. Lig	3rd	32	19	8	5	56	22	+34	65	R2	DNQ	Rasim Aykurt	19
1998–99	2. Lig	4th	32	18	9	5	58	27	+31	63	R1	DNQ	~~N/A.~~	~~N/A.~~
1999–00	2. Lig	1st↑	32	19	8	5	59	22	+37	65	R3	DNQ	Selim Çatalbaş	14
2000–01	1. Lig	6th	36	19	4	13	73	47	+26	61	R2	DNQ	Halim Karaköse	11
2001–02	1. Lig	18th	38	9	5	24	41	78	−37	32	R3	DNQ	Halim Karaköse	9
2002–03	1. Lig	1st	32	23	6	3	82	29	+53	75	R1	DNQ	~~N/A.~~	~~N/A.~~
2003–04	1. Lig	2nd↑	34	19	9	6	47	27	+20	66	R2	DNQ	~~N/A.~~	~~N/A.~~
2004–05	Süper Lig	14th	34	8	10	16	42	65	−23	34	QF	DNQ	Samuel Johnson	9
2005–06	Süper Lig	5th	34	15	6	13	59	42	+17	51	QF	DNQ	Gökhan Ünal	32
2006–07	Süper Lig	5th	34	13	12	9	54	43	+11	51	GS	R1	Gökhan Ünal	20
2007–08	Süper Lig	5th	34	15	10	9	50	31	+19	55	W	DNQ	Gökhan Ünal	12
2008–09	Süper Lig	7th	34	13	11	10	38	26	+12	50	GS	R1	Mehmet Topuz	14
2009–10	Süper Lig	8th	34	14	9	11	45	37	+8	51	PO	DNQ	Ariza Makukula	21
2010–11	Süper Lig	6th	34	14	9	11	46	44	+2	51	PO	DNQ	Marcelo Zalayeta	8
2011–12	Süper Lig	11th	34	13	5	16	42	39	+3	44	QF	DNQ	James Troisi	11
2012–13	Süper Lig	5th	34	15	7	12	48	45	+3	52	R2	DNQ	Bobô	18
2013–14	Süper Lig	18th↓	34	7	8	19	30	58	−28	29	R5	DNQ	Mert Nobre	6
2014–15	1. Lig	1st↑	34	21	9	4	61	24	+37	72	QF	DNQ	Mert Nobre	16
2015–16	Süper Lig	15th	34	7	13	14	25	41	−16	34	L16	DNQ	Sinan Bakış	8
2016–17	Süper Lig	15th	34	10	8	16	47	58	−11	38	QF	DNQ	Welliton	15
2017–18	Süper Lig	9th	34	12	8	14	44	55	−11	44	QF	DNQ	Umut Bulut	14
2018–19	Süper Lig	10th	34	10	11	13	35	50	−15	41	L16	DNQ	Tjaronn Chery	10
2019–20	Süper Lig	17th	34	8	8	18	40	72	−32	32	L16	DNQ	Pedro Henrique	10
2020–21	Süper Lig	17th	40	9	14	17	35	52	−17	41	R4	DNQ	İlhan Parlak	9
2021–22	Süper Lig	14th	38	12	11	15	54	61	−7	47	RU	DNQ	Mame Thiam	11
2022–23	Süper Lig	9th	36	15	5	16	55	61	−6	50	QF	DNQ	Mame Thiam	8
2023–24	Süper Lig	14th	38	11	12	15	44	57	−13	45	R5	DNQ	Mame Thiam	12
2024–25	Süper Lig	13th	38	12	9	17	45	57	−12	45	R3	DNQ	Duckens Nazon	9
2025–26	Süper Lig	17th↓	38	6	12	16	27	62	−35	30	R4	DNQ	German Onugkha	8
2026–27	1. Lig	TBD												

=== League participations ===
- Süper Lig: 1973–74, 1979–80, 1985–86, 2004–14, 2015–2026
- 1. Lig: 1966–73, 1975–79, 1980–85, 1986–88, 2000–04, 2014–15, 2026–
- 2. Lig: 1988–00

== Kayserispor in Europe ==
Kayserispor qualified for European competition for the first time in their history in the 2006–07 season via the UEFA Intertoto Cup. In the first round, they faced Hungarian side FC Sopron, drawing 3–3 in the away leg before winning 1–0 in the return leg in Kayseri. In the next round, Kayserispor faced Albanian champions KF Tirana. After winning 2–0 away, they defeated Tirana 3–1 in the home leg and progressed to the UEFA Cup.

In the 2006–07 UEFA Cup second qualifying round, they were matched with Greek club AE Larissa. Kayserispor drew 0–0 in Greece and then won 2–0 in the return leg at home, becoming the first and only Turkish team to win the Intertoto Cup that season. In the UEFA Cup first round, Kayserispor faced Dutch side AZ Alkmaar. After losing 3–2 away in the first leg, they drew 1–1 at home and were eliminated from the competition on aggregate.

After winning the 2007–08 Turkish Cup, Kayserispor qualified for the 2008–09 UEFA Cup and was drawn against French club Paris Saint-Germain. Kayserispor lost 2–1 at home and then held PSG to a goalless draw in Paris, but was eliminated on aggregate.

In total, Kayserispor played 10 matches in European competition between 2006 and 2008, recording 4 wins, 4 draws, and 2 losses, scoring 15 goals and conceding 10.

=== Summary ===
Competition	P	W	D	L	GF	GA	GD
UEFA Cup	6	2	2	2	9	7	+2
UEFA Intertoto Cup	4	2	2	0	6	3	+3
Total	10	4	4	2	15	10	+5

=== Results ===
Season	Competition	Round	Club	Home	Away	Aggregate
2006	UEFA Intertoto Cup	R2	(Hungary) Sopron	1–0	3–3	4–3
2006	UEFA Intertoto Cup	R3 (JW)	(Greece) AEL	2–0	0–0	2–0
2006–07	UEFA Cup	2QR	(Albania) Tirana	3–1	2–0	5–1
2006–07	UEFA Cup	R1	(Netherlands) AZ Alkmaar	1–1	2–3	3–4
2008–09	UEFA Cup	R1	(France) Paris Saint-Germain	1–2	0–0	1–2

=== UEFA Ranking history ===
Season	Rank	Points	Ref.
2007	176 ▲	9.791	
2008	159 ▲	11.469	
2009	161 ▼	8.445	
2010	163 ▼	8.890	
2011	167 ▼	9.010	
2012	175 ▼	7.810	
2013	178 ▼	7.900	

As of 2013

== Players ==
As of 30 October 2026. Note: Flags indicate national team as defined under FIFA eligibility rules; some limited exceptions apply. Players may hold more than one non-FIFA nationality.

No.	Pos.	Nation	Player
3	DF	GEO	Jemal Tabidze
4	DF	TUR	Semih Güler (captain)
5	DF	TUR	Kayra Cihan ^{U19 eligibility}
6	MF	TUR	Murat Akpınar
7	DF	TUR	Murat Uçar
8	MF	TUR	Sinan Kurt
9	FW	KOS	Florent Hasani
10	FW	TUR	Benhur Keser
11	MF	TUR	Ensar Kemaloğlu
12	GK	TUR	Hasan Kaan Yalçı ^{U19 eligibility}
14	DF	TUR	Muhammed Eren Arıkan
16	GK	TUR	Deniz Dönmezer ^{U19 eligibility}
17	DF	TUR	Mert Göçkan
18	DF	TUR	Fethi Özer
19	MF	TUR	Malik Hayvalı
20	DF	CUW	Joshua Brenet
22	MF	ROU	Denis Radu

No.	Pos.	Nation	Player
23	DF	TUR	Abdulsamet Burak
26	DF	TUR	Enes Tulgay ^{U19 eligibility}
27	FW	COL	Daniel Moreno
28	MF	GBS	Mamadi Camará
29	FW	TUR	Burak Erkan ^{U19 eligibility}
30	MF	TUR	Aras Çelik ^{U17 eligibility}
35	GK	TUR	Gökhan Değirmenci
38	MF	TUR	Ataol Taylan Karapınar ^{U19 eligibility}
40	MF	TUR	Efe Arslan Düzgün ^{U19 eligibility}
46	MF	TUR	Enes Melih Gökçek ^{U19 eligibility}
61	MF	TUR	Görkem Sağlam
71	MF	TUR	Oğulcan Çağlayan
77	DF	TUR	Cenk Şen
88	MF	ROU	Marco Dulca
97	FW	ALB	Taulant Seferi
99	FW	TUR	Talha Sarıarslan

=== Out on loan ===
Note: Flags indicate national team as defined under FIFA eligibility rules; some limited exceptions apply. Players may hold more than one non-FIFA nationality.

No.	Pos.	Nation	Player
—	DF	TUR	Ertuğrul Gazi Demirel (at İnkilap FSK until 30 June 2027)
—	FW	TUR	Arda Kaya (at Fatsa Belediyespor until 30 June 2027)
—	MF	TUR	Mustafa Tarık Obut (at Tokat Belediyespor until 30 June 2027)
—	FW	TUR	Alperen Öztaş (at Tokat Belediyespor until 30 June 2027)

=== Reserve and Academy players ===
Note: Flags indicate national team as defined under FIFA eligibility rules; some limited exceptions apply. Players may hold more than one non-FIFA nationality.

No.	Pos.	Nation	Player
91	MF	TUR	Ahmet Hüseyin Altun ^{U17 eligibility}
39	GK	TUR	Doğan Batuhan Atasoy ^{U19 eligibility}
34	MF	TUR	Tarik Baturalp Başkan ^{U19 eligibility}
45	MF	TUR	Eralp Çam ^{U19 eligibility}
21	MF	TUR	Yiğit Emre Çeltik
33	DF	TUR	Görkem Gönen ^{U19 eligibility}
24	DF	TUR	Mustafa Arda İçgül ^{U19 eligibility}

No.	Pos.	Nation	Player
42	MF	NED	Efe Mikail Kenan Kulaksız ^{U19 eligibility}
37	DF	TUR	Kerem Oğuztürk ^{U19 eligibility}
32	MF	TUR	Necip Özer ^{U19 eligibility}
44	MF	TUR	Yusuf Göktuğ Özkılıç ^{U19 eligibility}
41	FW	TUR	Güneş Talas ^{U19 eligibility}
13	MF	TUR	Muhammet Talha Yaşar ^{U19 eligibility}

== Non-playing staff ==
=== Administrative Staff ===
Position	Name
Chairman	(Turkey) Ali Çamlı
Vice-chairman	(Turkey) Tufan Koç
Deputy chairman	(Turkey) Mustafa Gülsoy
General secretary	(Turkey) Hüseyin Beyhan
Finance	(Turkey) Ayten Öztürk Ünal
Advertising	(Turkey) Yücel Şahin
Legal affairs & spokesperson	(Turkey) Emir Akpınar
Protocol & representatıon	(Turkey) Tevfik Kürtüncü
Academy supervisor	(Turkey) Samet Sarıoğlu
Academy supervisor	(Turkey) Aydın Yergin
Stadium & supporter liaison	(Turkey) Süleyman Akın
Stadium & supporter liaison	(Turkey) Mehmet Yay
NGO relations	(Turkey) Şeyhi Odakır

=== Coaching staff ===
Position	Name
Head coach	(Turkey) Atila Gerin
Assistant coach	(Turkey) Fikret Bağdemci
Assistant coach	(Turkey) Kemal Dulda
Assistant coach	(Guinea-Bissau) Aneximenes Pereira
Analyst	(Turkey) Orkun Aydın
Goalkeeper coach	(Turkey) Erdinç Kurt
Goalkeeper coach	(Turkey) Hamit Sayıcı
Athletic coach	(Turkey) Mert Yağız Aykın
Athletic coach	(Turkey) İlker Kıreker
Athletic coach	(Turkey) Mustafa Cebel Torun
Scouting	(Turkey) Mustafa Altun
