= 2003–04 Süper Lig =

46th season of top-tier Turkish football

Süper Lig
- Season: 2003–04
- Champions: Fenerbahçe (15th title)
- Relegated: Bursaspor; Adanaspor; Elazığspor
- Champions League: Fenerbahçe; Trabzonspor
- UEFA Cup: Beşiktaş; Gençlerbirliği
- Matches: 306
- Goals: 908 (2.97 per match)
- Top goalscorer: Zafer Biryol (25 goals)

The 2003–04 Süper Lig was the 46th league season, and the third season of Süper Lig. Fenerbahçe won their 15th title, being 4 points ahead Trabzonspor. Since Turkey dropped from eighth to tenth place in the UEFA association coefficient rankings at the end of the 2002–03 season, the league has lost two of its UEFA Cup berths.

An extremely dramatic final fixture took place, because in the relegation places, there were four teams. Bursaspor, with 37 points, İstanbulspor with 38, Çaykur Rizespor and Akçaabat Sebatspor with 39. İstanbulspor, managed by Aykut Kocaman, won 2-0 away at Konya over Konyaspor, Çaykur Rizespor defeated Beşiktaş 1-0, and Akçaabat Sebatspor beaten Ankaragücü 3-2. Bursaspor, defeating 1-0 Samsunspor reached the 40 points, but they were relegated.

== Foreign players ==
| Club | Player 1 | Player 2 | Player 3 | Player 4 | Player 5 | Player 6 | Player 7 | Player 8 | Former players |
|---|---|---|---|---|---|---|---|---|---|
| Adanaspor | (Bulgaria) Rosen Emilov | (Slovakia) Ľubomír Meszároš | (Slovakia) Marián Ľalík | | | | | | (Bulgaria) Svetlin Simeonov |
| Akçaabat Sebatspor | (Finland) Antti Sumiala | (Ghana) Emmanuel Osei | (Poland) Marek Zając | | | | | | (Ghana) Emmanuel Kuffour (South Africa) Dumisa Ngobe |
| Beşiktaş | (Brazil) Ronaldo Guiaro | (Brazil) Zago | (Colombia) Óscar Córdoba | (Egypt) Ahmed Hassan | (Italy) Federico Giunti | (Poland) Roman Dąbrowski | (Romania) Adrian Ilie | (Romania) Daniel Pancu | |
| Bursaspor | (Brazil) Júnior | (Romania) Bogdan Vintilă | (Romania) Cornel Frăsineanu | (Romania) Iulian Miu | (Serbia and Montenegro) Nenad Grozdić | (Slovenia) Milan Osterc | | | (Romania) Ionel Ganea |
| Çaykur Rizespor | (Albania) Klodian Duro | (Cape Verde) Nené | (Colombia) Gustavo Victoria | (Colombia) Rubiel Quintana | (Nigeria) Raphael Chukwu | (Slovakia) Pavol Sedlák | | | (Ghana) Emmanuel Tetteh |
| Denizlispor | (Brazil) Paulinho | (Cameroon) Souleymanou Hamidou | (Finland) Miikka Multaharju | (Slovakia) Roman Kratochvíl | | | | | (Finland) Janne Hietanen |
| Diyarbakırspor | (Albania) Redi Jupi | (Brazil) Gerino Moura | (France) Claude Bakadal | (Ghana) Edmond N'Tiamoah | (North Macedonia) Goran Stavrevski | (Tunisia) Kaies Ghodhbane | | | (Brazil) Dida |
| Elazığspor | (Brazil) Robson Carioca | (Cameroon) Jean-Emmanuel Effa Owona | (Finland) Jussi Nuorela | (Slovakia) Juraj Czinege | (Slovakia) Miroslav König | (Slovakia) Ondrej Debnár | | | |
| Fenerbahçe | (Brazil) Fábio Luciano | (Brazil) Márcio Nobre | (Brazil) Marco Aurélio | (Bulgaria) Ivaylo Petkov | (Croatia) Stjepan Tomas | (Netherlands) Pierre Van Hooijdonk | (Ukraine) Serhiy Rebrov | | (Brazil) Washington (Germany) Robert Enke |
| Galatasaray | (Bosnia and Herzegovina) Elvir Baljić | (Brazil) César Prates | (Brazil) João Batista | (Colombia) Faryd Mondragón | (Ghana) Richard Kingson | (Romania) Florin Bratu | (Romania) Ovidiu Petre | | (Brazil) Fábio Pinto (Democratic Republic of the Congo) Ali Lukunku (Netherlands) Frank de Boer (Romania) Gabriel Tamaș |
| Gaziantepspor | (Bulgaria) Zdravko Lazarov | (Ghana) Samuel Johnson | (Tunisia) Riadh Bouazizi | (Tunisia) Ziad Jaziri | | | | | (Ghana) Yaw Preko |
| Gençlerbirliği | (Australia) Josip Skoko | (Belgium) Filip Daems | (Democratic Republic of the Congo) Marcel Mbayo | (Guinea) Souleymane Youla | (Nigeria) Mohammed Lawal | (Slovenia) Damir Botonjič | | | |
| İstanbulspor | (Albania) Alban Bushi | (Brazil) André Paulo Pinto | (Bulgaria) Aleksandar Aleksandrov | (Cameroon) Alioum Saidou | (Nigeria) Uche Okechukwu | | | | (Bulgaria) Ivaylo Petkov (Bulgaria) Zdravko Zdravkov |
| Konyaspor | (Azerbaijan) Ernani Pereira | (Cameroon) Alioum Boukar | (France) Oumar Dieng | | | | | | (Brazil) Cacá |
| Malatyaspor | (Angola) Johnson Macaba | (Brazil) Pachola | (Egypt) Ayman Abdel-Aziz | (North Macedonia) Petar Miloševski | (South Africa) Helman Mkhalele | | | | (Poland) Jacek Ziarkowski |
| MKE Ankaragücü | (Brazil) Galeano | (Egypt) Amr El Desouki | (Egypt) Ramadan Ragap | (Egypt) Seif Daoud | (Ghana) Stephen Baidoo | (Guinea) Mamadouba Keita | (Paraguay) Santiago Salcedo | | (Belgium) Axel Smeets |
| Samsunspor | (Albania) Eleandro Pema | (Brazil) Adalto | (Brazil) Júlio César | (Brazil) Milton do Ó | (Nigeria) Ike Shorunmu | (Romania) Giani Kiriță | | | (Brazil) Juninho Cearense |
| Trabzonspor | (Australia) Michael Petkovic | (Belarus) Maksim Romaschenko | (Belgium) Hans Somers | (Belgium) Karel D'Haene | (Ghana) Augustine Ahinful | (Guinea) Ibrahim Yattara | (Serbia and Montenegro) Erkan Sulejmani | | (Belgium) Kurt Van De Paar (France) Oumar Dieng |

== Final league table ==
| Pos | Team | Pld | W | D | L | GF | GA | GD | Pts | Qualification or relegation |
|---|---|---|---|---|---|---|---|---|---|---|
| 1 | Fenerbahçe (C) | 34 | 23 | 7 | 4 | 82 | 41 | +41 | 76 | Qualification to Champions League group stage (Note: FC Porto, winner of 2003–04 UEFA Champions League, qualified for the UEFA Champions League group stage by their league position, so the title holder spot couldn't be used and this spot goes to best excluded champions, champions of Turkey, originally qualified for the third qualifying round.) |
| 2 | Trabzonspor | 34 | 22 | 6 | 6 | 60 | 38 | +22 | 72 | Qualification to Champions League second qualifying round |
| 3 | Beşiktaş | 34 | 18 | 8 | 8 | 65 | 45 | +20 | 62 | Qualification to UEFA Cup first round |
| 4 | Gaziantepspor | 34 | 18 | 3 | 13 | 52 | 51 | +1 | 57 | |
| 5 | Denizlispor | 34 | 17 | 4 | 13 | 52 | 43 | +9 | 55 | |
| 6 | Galatasaray | 34 | 15 | 9 | 10 | 56 | 47 | +9 | 54 | |
| 7 | Samsunspor | 34 | 13 | 7 | 14 | 46 | 47 | −1 | 46 | |
| 8 | Malatyaspor | 34 | 11 | 12 | 11 | 51 | 40 | +11 | 45 (Note: Malatyaspor were ahead of Ankaragücü on head-to-head record: Ankaragücü–Malatyaspor 0–0, Malatyaspor–Ankaragücü 1–0.) | |
| 9 | MKE Ankaragücü | 34 | 13 | 6 | 15 | 48 | 53 | −5 | 45 | |
| 10 | Gençlerbirliği | 34 | 12 | 8 | 14 | 56 | 52 | +4 | 44 (Note: Gençlerbirliği were ahead of Konyaspor on head-to-head goal difference: Gençlerbirliği–Konyaspor 4–0, Konyaspor–Gençlerbirliği 4–1.) | Qualification to UEFA Cup second qualifying round (Note: Trabzonspor, winner of 2003–04 Turkish Cup, qualified for the UEFA Champions League, so loser finalists Gençlerbirliği qualified for the UEFA Cup 2nd qualifying round.) |
| 11 | Konyaspor | 34 | 10 | 14 | 10 | 53 | 54 | −1 | 44 | |
| 12 | Diyarbakırspor | 34 | 12 | 7 | 15 | 44 | 54 | −10 | 43 | |
| 13 | Akçaabat Sebatspor | 34 | 11 | 9 | 14 | 45 | 53 | −8 | 42 (Note: Akçaabat Sebatspor were ahead of Çaykur Rizespor on head-to-head record: Akçaabat Sebatspor–Çaykur Rizespor 1–0, Çaykur Rizespor–Akçaabat Sebatspor 0–1.) | |
| 14 | Çaykur Rizespor | 34 | 13 | 3 | 18 | 37 | 53 | −16 | 42 | |
| 15 | İstanbulspor | 34 | 11 | 8 | 15 | 46 | 45 | +1 | 41 | |
| 16 | Bursaspor (R) | 34 | 10 | 10 | 14 | 40 | 40 | 0 | 40 | Relegation to Turkish Second League Category A |
| 17 | Adanaspor (R) | 34 | 6 | 4 | 24 | 38 | 73 | −35 | 22 (Note: Adanaspor were ahead of Elazığspor on head-to-head away goals scored: Adanaspor–Elazığspor 1–2, Elazığspor–Adanaspor 3–4.) | Relegation to Turkish Second League Category A |
| 18 | Elazığspor (R) | 34 | 5 | 7 | 22 | 37 | 79 | −42 | 22 | Relegation to Turkish Second League Category A |

Rules for classification: 1) points; 2) goal difference; 3) number of goals scored.
(C) Champions; (R) Relegated

== Results ==
| Home \ Away | ADA | AKÇ | BJK | BUR | ÇYR | DEN | DYB | ELA | FNB | GAL | GAZ | GEN | İST | KON | MAL | AGÜ | SAM | TRA |
|---|---|---|---|---|---|---|---|---|---|---|---|---|---|---|---|---|---|---|
| Adanaspor | | 1–2 | 1–0 | 0–3 | 0–1 | 4–1 | 2–1 | 1–2 | 1–2 | 0–2 | 2–3 | 2–2 | 1–1 | 1–1 | 0–1 | 1–3 | 2–3 | 0–1 |
| Akçaabat Sebatspor | 4–3 | | 1–2 | 0–1 | 1–0 | 0–2 | 0–1 | 3–1 | 1–1 | 2–1 | 1–2 | 0–3 | 1–3 | 1–1 | 2–2 | 3–2 | 1–0 | 0–0 |
| Beşiktaş | 2–1 | 0–2 | | 1–0 | 5–3 | 3–1 | 1–0 | 5–3 | 1–3 | 0–0 | 4–1 | 2–2 | 1–2 | 1–1 | 3–1 | 3–0 | 0–4 | 5–0 |
| Bursaspor | 6–0 | 1–1 | 0–1 | | 4–2 | 0–1 | 0–0 | 4–0 | 2–2 | 2–2 | 0–0 | 0–0 | 1–1 | 2–1 | 3–2 | 1–0 | 1–0 | 1–2 |
| Çaykur Rizespor | 0–2 | 0–1 | 1–0 | 1–0 | | 1–2 | 2–1 | 5–4 | 1–0 | 0–1 | 1–2 | 2–0 | 1–0 | 1–1 | 2–1 | 2–1 | 1–2 | 0–3 |
| Denizlispor | 1–1 | 1–2 | 2–3 | 4–0 | 1–1 | | 1–2 | 3–0 | 0–4 | 2–1 | 2–0 | 1–2 | 2–0 | 3–2 | 1–0 | 0–1 | 1–0 | 0–1 |
| Diyarbakırspor | 3–1 | 1–0 | 3–1 | 0–3 | 0–1 | 0–1 | | 2–0 | 1–2 | 0–0 | 2–1 | 3–2 | 1–2 | 1–1 | 2–0 | 1–1 | 2–2 | 2–2 |
| Elazığspor | 3–4 | 3–1 | 1–5 | 1–0 | 1–1 | 2–4 | 0–1 | | 0–1 | 2–2 | 1–2 | 1–1 | 1–1 | 0–0 | 0–0 | 1–2 | 1–0 | 0–3 |
| Fenerbahçe | 3–0 | 4–2 | 2–2 | 3–1 | 4–1 | 2–0 | 2–2 | 7–1 | | 2–1 | 3–1 | 1–0 | 0–3 | 5–2 | 2–4 | 3–1 | 1–1 | 3–1 |
| Galatasaray | 3–2 | 4–3 | 1–2 | 0–0 | 1–2 | 4–3 | 2–1 | 3–1 | 2–2 | | 3–0 | 2–1 | 2–2 | 2–1 | 2–2 | 2–1 | 1–0 | 1–2 |
| Gaziantepspor | 1–0 | 2–2 | 0–3 | 3–2 | 2–0 | 1–2 | 4–1 | 3–1 | 1–5 | 1–2 | | 2–0 | 2–1 | 3–1 | 1–3 | 2–1 | 1–0 | 1–2 |
| Gençlerbirliği | 6–0 | 3–1 | 1–2 | 2–0 | 1–0 | 1–3 | 3–4 | 2–3 | 0–1 | 2–2 | 1–0 | | 1–0 | 4–0 | 2–2 | 1–2 | 2–1 | 2–2 |
| İstanbulspor | 1–0 | 1–3 | 1–1 | 3–0 | 3–0 | 0–3 | 1–3 | 3–1 | 0–1 | 3–1 | 0–1 | 3–0 | | 2–3 | 0–0 | 2–3 | 0–0 | 0–2 |
| Konyaspor | 4–1 | 0–0 | 2–2 | 1–1 | 2–1 | 1–1 | 3–1 | 2–0 | 2–4 | 1–0 | 0–3 | 4–1 | 0–2 | | 3–3 | 1–1 | 0–0 | 3–3 |
| Malatyaspor | 2–0 | 3–1 | 0–0 | 2–1 | 0–1 | 0–1 | 5–0 | 3–0 | 2–2 | 1–2 | 0–0 | 1–1 | 2–1 | 1–3 | | 1–0 | 5–0 | 2–3 |
| MKE Ankaragücü | 1–2 | 1–1 | 1–1 | 2–0 | 4–1 | 1–1 | 3–1 | 1–0 | 1–4 | 1–0 | 1–4 | 2–3 | 2–1 | 1–0 | 0–0 | | 4–2 | 1–2 |
| Samsunspor | 2–1 | 1–1 | 1–3 | 0–0 | 2–1 | 2–1 | 3–1 | 2–0 | 3–0 | 1–0 | 1–2 | 2–1 | 3–3 | 2–3 | 1–0 | 3–2 | | 1–3 |
| Trabzonspor | 2–1 | 2–1 | 3–0 | 2–0 | 1–0 | 1–0 | 2–0 | 2–2 | 0–1 | 2–4 | 3–0 | 1–3 | 2–0 | 0–3 | 0–0 | 3–0 | 2–1 | |

Source: TFF, Mackolik
Legend: Blue = home team win; Yellow = draw; Red = away team win.

== Top scorers ==
| Rank | Player | Club | Goals |
|---|---|---|---|
| 1 | (Turkey) Zafer Biryol | Konyaspor | 25 |
| 2 | (Netherlands) Pierre van Hooijdonk | Fenerbahçe | 24 |
| 3 | (Turkey) Serkan Aykut | Samsunspor | 20 |
| 4 | (Turkey) Tuncay | Fenerbahçe | 19 |
| 5 | (Guinea) Souleymane Youla | Gençlerbirliği | 16 |
| 5 | (Turkey) Yunus Altun | Elazığspor | 16 |
| 7 | (Egypt) Ahmed Hassan | Beşiktaş | 14 |
| 7 | (Turkey) Gökdeniz Karadeniz | Trabzonspor | 14 |
| 7 | (Turkey) Necati Ateş | Adanaspor / Galatasaray | 14 |
| 7 | (Turkey) Okan Yılmaz | Bursaspor | 14 |

== Attendances ==
| # | Football club | Home games | Average attendance |
|---|---|---|---|
| 1 | Fenerbahçe | 17 | 41,636 |
| 2 | Beşiktaş | 17 | 28,091 |
| 3 | Galatasaray | 17 | 24,193 |
| 4 | Trabzonspor | 17 | 19,333 |
| 5 | Gençlerbirliği | 17 | 18,583 |
| 6 | Ankaragücü | 17 | 18,091 |
| 7 | Bursaspor | 17 | 16,850 |
| 8 | Konyaspor | 17 | 16,300 |
| 9 | Gaziantepspor | 17 | 14,764 |
| 10 | Diyarbakırspor | 17 | 13,833 |
| 11 | Malatyaspor | 17 | 13,583 |
| 12 | Adanaspor | 17 | 13,200 |
| 13 | Denizlispor | 17 | 13,167 |
| 14 | Samsunspor | 17 | 13,064 |
| 15 | Elazığspor | 17 | 9,727 |
| 16 | Akçaabat Sebatspor | 17 | 9,600 |
| 17 | İstanbulspor | 17 | 9,292 |
| 18 | Çaykur Rizespor | 17 | 9,227 |
