= 2004–05 Süper Lig =

47th season of top-tier Turkish football

Süper Lig
- Season: 2004–05
- Champions: Fenerbahçe; 16th title
- Relegated: Sakaryaspor; İstanbulspor; Akçaabat Sebatspor
- Champions League: Fenerbahçe; Trabzonspor
- UEFA Cup: Galatasaray; Beşiktaş
- Intertoto Cup: Ankaraspor
- Matches played: 306
- Goals scored: 901 (2.94 per match)
- Top goalscorer: Fatih Tekke (31 goals)
- Biggest home win: Fenerbahçe 7–0 Kayserispor
- Biggest away win: Akçaabat Sebatspor 0–5 Gençlerbirliği; İstanbulspor 0–5 Trabzonspor
- Highest scoring: MKE Ankaragücü 2–7 Sakaryaspor

The 2004–05 Süper Lig was 47th edition of Turkish league and 4th edition of Turkish Super League. Fenerbahçe won their 16th title, being 3 points ahead Trabzonspor and 4 points ahead Galatasaray. In the final fixture, Diyarbakırspor were 1 point behind Sakaryaspor. Malatyaspor and Diyarbakırspor are rivals, but Malatyaspor, defeating 4-2 Sakaryaspor at home, allowed Diyarbakırspor to remain, winning 1-0 away over Samsunspor. Galatasaray won the Cup, beating rivals Fenerbahçe with 5-1.

== Foreign players ==
Club	Player 1	Player 2	Player 3	Player 4	Player 5	Player 6	Player 7	Player 8	Former Players
Akçaabat Sebatspor	(Brazil) Ânderson Lopes	(Brazil) Vlademir	(France) Claude Bakadal	(North Macedonia) Petar Miloševski	(Tunisia) Emir Mkademi				
Ankaraspor	(Brazil) Asprilla	(Brazil) Jabá	(Brazil) Tita	(Hungary) Balázs Molnár	(Serbia and Montenegro) Dragoslav Jevrić				(Brazil) Fábio Noronha (Brazil) Sobrinho
Beşiktaş	(Brazil) Ronaldo Guiaro	(Colombia) Óscar Córdoba	(Egypt) Ahmed Hassan	(Norway) John Carew	(Romania) Daniel Pancu	(Spain) Juanfran			(Poland) Roman Dąbrowski
Çaykur Rizespor	(Bulgaria) Zdravko Zdravkov	(Colombia) Gustavo Victoria	(Egypt) Ahmed Salah Hosny	(Egypt) Besheer El-Tabei	(Hungary) István Ferenczi				(France) Ibrahim Ba
Denizlispor	(Cameroon) Souleymanou Hamidou	(Czech Republic) Martin Horák	(Czech Republic) Tomáš Abrahám	(Finland) Miikka Multaharju	(Slovakia) Roman Kratochvíl	(South Africa) Ryan Botha			
Diyarbakırspor	(Albania) Redi Jupi	(Brazil) Marlon	(Guinea) Abdoul Karim Sylla	(Ivory Coast) Yacouba Bamba	(North Macedonia) Goran Stavrevski	(Tunisia) Khaled Fadhel			
Fenerbahçe	(Brazil) Alex	(Brazil) Fábio Luciano	(Brazil) Márcio Nobre	(Brazil) Mehmet Aurélio	(France) Nicolas Anelka	(Netherlands) Pierre van Hooijdonk			(Brazil) Fabiano
Galatasaray	(Brazil) Flávio Conceição	(Cameroon) Rigobert Song	(Colombia) Faryd Mondragón	(Croatia) Stjepan Tomas	(France) Franck Ribéry	(Ghana) Richard Kingson			(Bosnia and Herzegovina) Elvir Baljić (Cameroon) Alioum Saidou (Romania) Ovidiu Petre
Gaziantepspor	(Angola) André Macanga	(Bosnia and Herzegovina) Kenan Hasagić	(Bulgaria) Zdravko Lazarov	(Libya) Tarik El Taib	(Tunisia) Riadh Bouazizi	(Tunisia) Ziad Jaziri			
Gençlerbirliği	(Australia) Josip Skoko	(Guinea) Souleymane Youla	(Nigeria) Mohammed Lawal	(Tunisia) Sami Gtari					(Belgium) Filip Daems
İstanbulspor	(Albania) Alban Bushi	(Brazil) Andre Paulo Pinto	(Bulgaria) Aleksandar Aleksandrov	(Democratic Republic of the Congo) Kabamba Musasa	(Egypt) Ramadan Ragap	(Nigeria) Uche Okechukwu			(England) Richard Offiong (Ghana) Moses Sakyi (Israel) Ofir Haim
Kayserispor	(Czech Republic) Erich Brabec	(Czech Republic) Tomáš Pešír	(Ghana) Samuel Johnson	(Israel) Salim Tuama	(Israel) Pini Balili	(Slovakia) Rastislav Michalík			(Albania) Vioresin Sinani (Hungary) Zoltán Pető
Konyaspor	(Australia) Jason Petkovic	(Azerbaijan) Ernani Pereira	(Bosnia and Herzegovina) Elvir Baljić	(Guinea) Ousmane N'Gom Camara					(France) Oumar Dieng (Ivory Coast) Cyril Domoraud
Malatyaspor	(Cameroon) Alioum Saidou	(Guinea) Schuman Bah	(Hungary) Balázs Tóth	(Slovenia) Milan Osterc	(South Africa) Helman Mkhalele				(Democratic Republic of the Congo) Marcel Mbayo (North Macedonia) Ilčo Naumoski
MKE Ankaragücü	(Brazil) Flávio	(Burkina Faso) Hervé Zengue	(Cameroon) Jean-Emmanuel Effa Owona	(Cameroon) Joseph Tchango	(Egypt) Amr El Desouki	(Ghana) Augustine Ahinful	(Ghana) Stephen Baidoo		(Egypt) Mohamed Gouda (Ivory Coast) Tchiressoua Guel
Sakaryaspor	(Democratic Republic of the Congo) Marcel Mbayo	(Rwanda) Honore Kabongo	(Rwanda) Saïd Makasi	(Senegal) Mbaye Badji	(Senegal) Omar Diallo				(Serbia and Montenegro) Shpëtim Hasani
Samsunspor	(Bulgaria) Georgi Ivanov	(Bulgaria) Yordan Petkov	(Nigeria) Ike Shorunmu	(Romania) Giani Kiriță	(Tunisia) Anis Ayari	(Tunisia) Kaies Ghodhbane			(Albania) Eleandro Pema
Trabzonspor	(Australia) Michael Petkovic	(Belgium) Karel D'Haene	(Guinea) Ibrahim Yattara	(Poland) Mirosław Szymkowiak	(South Korea) Lee Eul-yong				(Belgium) Bernd Thijs (Ghana) Augustine Ahinful

== Final league table ==
Pos	Team	Pld	W	D	L	GF	GA	GD	Pts	Qualification or relegation
1	Fenerbahçe (C)	34	26	2	6	77	24	+53	80	Qualification to Champions League group stage (Note: Liverpool, winner of 2004–05 UEFA Champions League, forced to play in the UEFA Champions League first qualifying round as they cannot finish 2004–05 FA Premier League top four, so the title holder spot in the group stage became vacant and this spot goes to best excluded champions, champion of Turkey, originally qualified for the third qualifying round.)
2	Trabzonspor	34	24	5	5	73	29	+44	77	Qualification to Champions League second qualifying round
3	Galatasaray	34	24	4	6	64	25	+39	76	Qualification to UEFA Cup first round (Note: Galatasaray have won the 2004–05 Turkish Cup competition and thus are qualified for the first round of the UEFA Cup.)
4	Beşiktaş	34	20	9	5	70	39	+31	69	Qualification to UEFA Cup second qualifying round
5	Gençlerbirliği	34	14	9	11	52	41	+11	51	
6	Denizlispor	34	13	10	11	46	45	+1	49	
7	Ankaraspor	34	13	9	12	52	48	+4	48	Qualification to Intertoto Cup second round
8	Konyaspor	34	11	12	11	62	62	0	45	
9	Gaziantepspor	34	13	5	16	49	55	−6	44	
10	Çaykur Rizespor	34	11	10	13	36	37	−1	43	
11	Malatyaspor	34	12	7	15	47	53	−6	43	
12	Samsunspor	34	10	8	16	40	55	−15	38 (Note: Samsunspor were ahead of Ankaragücü on head-to-head record: Samsunspor–Ankaragücü 1–1, Ankaragücü–Samsunspor 1–2.)	
13	MKE Ankaragücü	34	10	8	16	37	61	−24	38	
14	Kayserispor	34	8	10	16	42	65	−23	34 (Note: Kayserispor were ahead of Diyarbakırspor on head-to-head goal difference: Kayserispor–Diyarbakırspor 3–0, Diyarbakırspor–Kayserispor 2–1.)	
15	Diyarbakırspor	34	9	7	18	31	53	−22	34	
16	Sakaryaspor (R)	34	9	5	20	51	72	−21	32	Relegation to Turkish Second League Category A
17	İstanbulspor (R)	34	5	12	17	32	59	−27	27	Relegation to Turkish Second League Category A
18	Akçaabat Sebatspor (R)	34	3	10	21	40	78	−38	19	Relegation to Turkish Second League Category A

Rules for classification: 1) points; 2) goal difference; 3) number of goals scored.
(C) Champions; (R) Relegated

== Results ==
Home \ Away	AKÇ	ANK	BJK	ÇYR	DEN	DYB	FNB	GAL	GAZ	GEN	İST	KAY	KON	MAL	AGÜ	SAK	SAM	TRA
Akçaabat Sebatspor		1–3	2–2	0–0	2–1	2–2	1–4	1–3	2–0	0–5	2–2	0–0	3–5	1–1	0–0	0–1	3–0	0–1
Ankaraspor	2–1		2–4	1–0	3–2	3–0	0–1	0–2	1–0	2–1	3–2	4–1	1–3	1–3	2–0	1–1	0–1	1–1
Beşiktaş	6–1	2–3		2–2	2–0	4–0	2–1	0–0	3–4	1–1	0–0	3–2	2–1	1–0	4–1	2–1	2–0	1–0
Çaykur Rizespor	2–1	2–1	0–1		2–0	3–0	2–2	0–3	1–1	1–1	1–1	2–1	1–1	0–1	1–2	2–0	2–0	1–2
Denizlispor	4–2	1–1	3–1	3–0		0–0	2–0	0–0	2–1	1–1	2–2	2–1	2–1	0–0	2–0	6–1	2–0	0–2
Diyarbakırspor	1–0	1–0	0–0	1–1	0–1		0–2	2–0	3–0	1–3	1–0	2–1	3–3	1–2	0–1	1–0	3–0	0–1
Fenerbahçe	2–0	1–0	3–4	2–0	2–0	3–0		1–0	2–0	3–2	4–0	7–0	3–0	3–1	5–0	6–0	2–1	2–1
Galatasaray	2–0	4–2	1–0	2–1	4–0	1–0	1–0		5–1	1–2	4–1	5–1	3–1	1–1	2–1	1–0	3–1	0–2
Gaziantepspor	6–4	2–1	0–1	0–1	3–1	1–1	0–1	1–0		1–0	0–1	1–2	2–0	4–3	2–0	1–0	1–3	3–2
Gençlerbirliği	1–1	1–1	1–1	2–1	1–3	2–0	1–2	1–3	2–1		1–0	0–0	2–1	5–3	4–0	1–0	0–0	0–1
İstanbulspor	1–0	1–1	1–1	0–3	1–1	1–1	0–3	0–3	1–3	1–3		2–0	2–2	0–2	1–2	3–0	1–1	0–5
Kayserispor	4–1	0–0	1–2	2–1	1–0	3–0	0–2	2–2	3–1	1–2	0–0		2–2	1–1	1–1	1–0	1–4	0–3
Konyaspor	3–3	2–3	2–2	0–0	0–0	2–1	4–2	0–2	2–2	3–2	2–1	3–1		2–0	3–4	2–0	3–0	1–1
Malatyaspor	2–2	2–1	1–1	0–1	2–2	2–1	0–2	0–1	2–1	0–2	2–0	0–1	5–0		1–0	4–2	1–2	3–4
MKE Ankaragücü	2–1	2–5	1–4	0–0	1–1	4–1	1–0	0–1	2–1	1–0	0–0	2–2	1–1	3–0		2–7	1–2	0–2
Sakaryaspor	4–2	1–1	1–4	3–1	1–2	3–2	0–1	1–2	2–2	2–2	1–3	4–2	1–4	4–1	1–0		4–2	1–3
Samsunspor	3–0	0–0	2–4	0–1	4–0	0–1	1–1	2–1	1–3	2–0	2–1	3–3	1–1	0–1	1–1	1–1		0–4
Trabzonspor	3–1	2–2	1–0	1–0	3–0	4–1	0–2	0–1	0–0	3–1	1–1	3–1	4–2	3–0	3–1	4–3	3–0	

Source: TFF, Mackolik
Legend: Blue = home team win; Yellow = draw; Red = away team win.

== Statistics ==
=== Top scorers ===
Rank	Player	Club	Goals
1	(Turkey) Fatih Tekke	Trabzonspor	31
2	(Brazil) Alex	Fenerbahçe	24
3	(Turkey) Hakan Şükür	Galatasaray	18
3	(Brazil) Mert Nobre	Fenerbahçe	18
3	(Turkey) Zafer Biryol	Konyaspor	18
6	(Brazil) Jaba	Ankaraspor	17
7	(Turkey) Cenk Işler	Samsunspor	15
7	(Turkey) Necati Ateş	Galatasaray	15
9	(Guinea) Souleymane Youla	Gençlerbirliği	14
10	(Norway) John Carew	Beşiktaş	13
10	(Bulgaria) Zdravko Lazarov	Gaziantepspor	13

=== Hat-tricks ===
Player	For	Against	Result	Date
(Turkey) Hakan Şükür	Galatasaray	Konyaspor	3–1	8 August 2004
(Brazil) Jaba	Ankaraspor	Akçaabat Sebatspor	3–1	8 August 2004
(Turkey) Fatih Tekke	Trabzonspor	Malatyaspor	4–3	21 August 2004
(Turkey) Atilla Birlik	Malatyaspor	Konyaspor	5–0	26 September 2004
(Brazil) Alex de Souza	Fenerbahçe	MKE Ankaragücü	5–0	3 December 2004
(Bulgaria) Zdravko Lazarov	Gaziantepspor	Akçaabat Sebatspor	6–4	5 December 2004
(Turkey) Fatih Tekke	Trabzonspor	Samsunspor	4–0	11 December 2004
(Turkey) Umut Bulut	MKE Ankaragücü	Konyaspor	4–3	12 December 2004
(Turkey) Murat Sözkesen	Çaykur Rizespor	Diyarbakırspor	3–0	12 December 2004
(Tunisia) Ziad Jaziri	Gaziantepspor	Denizlispor	3–1	30 January 2005
(Turkey) Ersen Martin	Denizlispor	Sakaryaspor	6–1	6 February 2005
(Turkey) Hasan Kabze	Galatasaray	İstanbulspor	3–0	12 March 2005
(Brazil) Alex de Souza	Fenerbahçe	Gençlerbirliği	3–2	13 March 2005
(Turkey) Sertan Eser	Gençlerbirliği	Akçaabat Sebatspor	5–0	30 April 2005
(Turkey) Fatih Tekke	Trabzonspor	Konyaspor	4–2	7 May 2005
