= 2005–06 Süper Lig =

48th season of top-tier Turkish football

Süper Lig
- Season: 2005–06
- Champions: Galatasaray; 16th title
- Relegated: Malatyaspor; Samsunspor; Diyarbakırspor
- Champions League: Galatasaray; Fenerbahçe
- UEFA Cup: Beşiktaş; Trabzonspor
- Intertoto Cup: Kayserispor
- Matches played: 306
- Goals scored: 849 (2.77 per match)
- Top goalscorer: Gökhan Ünal (25 goals)

The 2005–06 Süper Lig season began with Turkcell signing a 5-year sponsorship deal with the Turkish Football Federation to name the league Turkcell Süper Lig.

Since Turkey dropped from tenth to eleventh place in the UEFA association coefficient rankings at the end of the 2004–05 season, the champions will not directly be entered into the group stage of the UEFA Champions League any more, but rather have to begin in the third qualification round.

The season also saw a first in Turkish football; for the first time in history the team that entered the last week first, Fenerbahçe, failed to win the title. Fenerbahçe and Galatasaray went into the last week deadlocked at 80 points and Fenerbahçe had a better head-to-head record. Fenerbahçe needed only a win to defend their title and win their third successive championship. However, a 1–1 draw to Denizlispor combined with a 3–0 Galatasaray win against Kayserispor gave Galatasaray their 16th league title. The same day, Gaziantepspor defeated Malatyaspor 1–0 and remained in the Süper Lig. Ankaraspor, with a 1–0 win away to Erciyesspor, managed to remain, but Malatyaspor, Samsunspor and Diyarbakırspor were relegated to TFF First League.

== Foreign players ==
Club	Player 1	Player 2	Player 3	Player 4	Player 5	Player 6	Player 7	Player 8	Former Players
Ankaragücü	(Bosnia and Herzegovina) Elvir Baljić	(Brazil) Héverton	(Brazil) Robson	(Bulgaria) Ivaylo Petkov	(Burkina Faso) Hervé Zengue	(Egypt) Ahmad Belal	(Martinique) Charles-Édouard Coridon	(Tunisia) Ali Ghariani	(Brazil) Jean
Ankaraspor	(Brazil) Jabá	(Brazil) Tita	(Brazil) Wederson	(Czech Republic) Adam Petrouš	(Serbia and Montenegro) Dragoslav Jevrić	(Serbia and Montenegro) Radoslav Batak			(Hungary) Balázs Molnár
Beşiktaş	(Brazil) Bobô	(Brazil) Kléberson	(Colombia) Óscar Córdoba	(Czech Republic) Tomáš Jun	(Egypt) Ahmed Hassan				(Brazil) Aílton (Romania) Daniel Pancu
Çaykur Rizespor	(Brazil) Allyson	(Brazil) Douglas	(Bulgaria) Zdravko Zdravkov	(Colombia) Gustavo Victoria	(Egypt) Besheer El-Tabei	(Senegal) Pape Ciré Dia			
Denizlispor	(Brazil) Alessandro Cambalhota	(Brazil) Alex Alves	(Cameroon) Souleymanou Hamidou	(Czech Republic) Tomáš Abrahám	(Finland) Miikka Multaharju	(Slovakia) Roman Kratochvíl			(Czech Republic) Radek Dosoudil
Diyarbakırspor	(Albania) Redi Jupi	(Bosnia and Herzegovina) Borislav Mikić	(North Macedonia) Goce Sedloski	(North Macedonia) Goran Maznov	(North Macedonia) Goran Stavrevski	(Slovenia) Ermin Rakovič			(North Macedonia) Igor Jančevski (Tunisia) Sami Gtari
Fenerbahçe	(Brazil) Alex	(Brazil) Fábio Luciano	(Brazil) Márcio Nobre	(Brazil) Marco Aurélio	(France) Nicolas Anelka	(Ghana) Stephen Appiah			
Galatasaray	(Cameroon) Alioum Saidou	(Cameroon) Rigobert Song	(Colombia) Faryd Mondragón	(Croatia) Stjepan Tomas	(Czech Republic) Marek Heinz	(Serbia and Montenegro) Saša Ilić			
Gaziantepspor	(Bosnia and Herzegovina) Kenan Hasagić	(Bulgaria) Zdravko Lazarov	(Libya) Tarik El Taib	(Morocco) Abdelilah Fahmi	(Romania) Giani Kiriță	(Tunisia) Sofiane Melliti	(Zimbabwe) Shingayi Kaondera		(Bulgaria) Georgi Ivanov
Gençlerbirliği	(Belgium) Christophe Lepoint	(Brazil) Marcinho	(Nigeria) David Abwo	(Nigeria) Isaac Promise	(Serbia and Montenegro) Igor Bogdanović	(Sweden) Fredrik Risp			(Sweden) Christian Järdler
Kayserispor	(Azerbaijan) Rashad Sadygov	(Bulgaria) Aleksandar Aleksandrov	(Bulgaria) Dimitar Ivankov	(Ghana) Samuel Johnson	(Slovenia) Aleksandar Rodić				
Kayseri Erciyesspor	(Brazil) Júlio César	(Brazil) Junivan	(Cameroon) Lucien Mettomo	(Ivory Coast) Serge Dié	(Nigeria) Victor Agali	(Tunisia) Khaled Fadhel	(Tunisia) Riadh Bouazizi		(Senegal) Mamadou Seck
Konyaspor	(Cameroon) Gustave Bebbe	(Tunisia) Kaies Ghodhbane	(Venezuela) Jobany Rivero						(Croatia) Vladimir Vasilj (Egypt) Ahmad Belal
Malatyaspor	(Brazil) Cris	(Czech Republic) Jiří Homola	(Czech Republic) Jiří Mašek	(Czech Republic) Tomáš Michálek	(Czech Republic) Zdeněk Šenkeřík	(Hungary) Balázs Tóth	(Sweden) Sebastian Johansson		(Brazil) Catatau (Cameroon) Jean-Emmanuel Owona (Sierra Leone) Ibrahim Kargbo
Samsunspor	(Brazil) Marciel	(Brazil) Rafael Marques	(Cameroon) Alioum Boukar	(Senegal) Ibrahima Gueye	(Serbia and Montenegro) Dejan Maksić	(Tunisia) Anis Ayari			(Bulgaria) Yordan Petkov (Serbia and Montenegro) Dejan Rađenović (Serbia and Montenegro) Oliver Kovačević

== Final league table ==
Pos	Team	Pld	W	D	L	GF	GA	GD	Pts	Qualification or relegation
1	Galatasaray (C)	34	26	5	3	82	34	+48	83	Qualification to Champions League third qualifying round
2	Fenerbahçe	34	25	6	3	90	34	+56	81	Qualification to Champions League second qualifying round
3	Beşiktaş	34	15	9	10	52	39	+13	54	Qualification to UEFA Cup first round (Note: Beşiktaş have won the 2005–06 Turkish Cup competition and thus are qualified for the first round of the UEFA Cup.)
4	Trabzonspor	34	15	7	12	51	42	+9	52	Qualification to UEFA Cup second qualifying round
5	Kayserispor	34	15	6	13	59	42	+17	51 (Note: Kayserispor were ahead of Gençlerbirliği on head-to-head goal difference: Kayserispor–Gençlerbirliği 2–0, Gençlerbirliği–Kayserispor 3–2.)	Qualification to Intertoto Cup second round
6	Gençlerbirliği	34	14	9	11	47	39	+8	51	
7	Konyaspor	34	12	10	12	39	43	−4	46	
8	Sivasspor	34	10	13	11	34	44	−10	43	
9	Çaykur Rizespor	34	10	11	13	35	44	−9	41	
10	Kayseri Erciyesspor	34	9	13	12	36	47	−11	40 (Note: Kayseri Erciyesspor were ahead of Gaziantepspor and Manisaspor on head-to-head points: Kayseri Erciyesspor: 12 pts, Gaziantepspor: 4 pts, Manisaspor: 1 pts.)	
11	Gaziantepspor	34	10	10	14	34	50	−16	40	
12	Manisaspor	34	11	7	16	52	61	−9	40	
13	MKE Ankaragücü	34	10	9	15	43	48	−5	39 (Note: Trabzonspor were ahead of Ankaraspor on head-to-head record: Ankaragücü–Ankaraspor 3–2, Ankaraspor–Ankaragücü 1–2.)	
14	Ankaraspor	34	9	12	13	44	51	−7	39	
15	Denizlispor	34	9	10	15	41	50	−9	37	
16	Malatyaspor (R)	34	9	9	16	34	50	−16	36 (Note: Malatyaspor were ahead of Samsunspor on head-to-head record: Malatyaspor–Samsunspor 3–0, Samsunspor–Malatyaspor 1–2.)	Relegation to Türk Telekom League A
17	Samsunspor (R)	34	9	9	16	45	62	−17	36	Relegation to Türk Telekom League A
18	Diyarbakırspor (R)	34	8	5	21	31	69	−38	29	Relegation to Türk Telekom League A

Rules for classification: 1) points; 2) goal difference; 3) number of goals scored.
(C) Champions; (R) Relegated

== Results ==
Home \ Away	ANG	ANK	BJK	ÇRZ	DEN	DIY	FEN	GSY	GAZ	GBR	KAY	KER	KON	MAL	SAM	SIV	TRB	VMN
Ankaragücü		3–2	2–3	1–0	1–1	5–1	1–4	0–1	2–1	1–1	2–0	1–2	3–0	0–1	1–1	0–0	1–2	0–2
Ankaraspor	1–2		2–0	0–0	1–3	3–3	2–1	1–2	3–0	0–0	1–3	1–1	0–0	1–2	3–3	1–1	0–2	3–1
Beşiktaş	4–2	3–0		0–1	2–0	1–1	1–2	1–2	0–1	2–1	0–0	2–2	0–1	2–2	3–2	0–1	0–1	3–1
Çaykur Rizespor	1–0	1–1	1–0		1–2	2–0	1–2	0–3	0–0	1–1	0–0	2–2	1–1	1–0	1–2	1–0	1–6	4–1
Denizlispor	0–0	1–1	1–1	2–0		1–0	1–1	1–2	1–2	0–2	1–3	1–1	5–2	1–0	1–2	4–0	0–1	1–1
Diyarbakırspor	0–3	1–2	1–3	1–0	1–0		0–4	1–3	1–2	0–2	0–2	2–1	0–3 (Note: Diyarbakırspor-Konyaspor match was halted at 86th minute due to breaking seats and throwing them by spectators to the pitch and the police during score was 0-1. This match awarded 3-0 for Konyaspor.)	3–2	0–0	1–1	3–0	0–2
Fenerbahçe	2–1	2–1	2–2	1–1	6–2	2–2		4–0	1–0	3–0	3–0	4–2	5–0	2–0	5–2	3–0	2–2	2–1
Galatasaray	2–0	4–0	3–2	4–2	1–1	2–0	0–1		6–0	3–0	3–0	4–2	2–1	5–2	3–2	2–0	4–1	4–2
Gaziantepspor	1–1	3–3	2–2	1–1	1–0	2–0	0–2	2–2		1–1	1–4	1–2	2–0	1–0	0–1	0–0	0–2	1–1
Gençlerbirliği	1–1	2–1	0–2	1–3	3–3	4–0	0–0	2–1	3–1		3–2	3–0	1–1	2–0	0–1	0–1	1–0	2–1
Kayserispor	1–2	2–1	0–1	3–1	2–2	3–0	1–0	1–3	0–1	2–0		1–2	1–0	2–0	6–3	2–2	4–2	7–2
Kayseri Erciyesspor	1–2	0–1	1–1	0–2	2–0	0–2	0–3	1–2	1–0	2–0	0–0		0–0	1–1	2–2	0–0	1–0	2–1
Konyaspor	2–0	0–0	0–1	3–1	1–0	5–1	2–4	0–1	3–2	0–3	1–0	2–0		0–2	4–2	2–1	0–0	1–1
Malatyaspor	0–0	0–2	1–1	1–0	0–1	1–2	0–3	1–1	2–0	1–3	2–1	2–2	1–0		3–0	0–0	1–1	0–5
Samsunspor	2–1	0–1	1–3	0–0	1–2	1–0	0–5	1–2	2–3	2–0	0–0	1–1	1–1	1–2		1–2	3–1	1–1
Sivasspor	3–1	2–2	1–3	1–2	1–0	4–1	2–3	0–0	0–0	2–1	0–5	3–0	1–1	1–1	0–3		2–1	1–0
Trabzonspor	3–1	2–3	1–2	3–1	3–0	3–0	2–3	1–1	2–0	1–1	2–1	0–0	1–2	1–0	2–1	0–0		0–2
Vestel Manisaspor	2–2	1–0	0–1	1–1	4–2	0–3	5–3	1–4	1–2	0–3	1–0	0–2	0–0	4–3	3–0	3–1	1–2	

Source: TFF
Legend: Blue = home team win; Yellow = draw; Red = away team win.

== Statistics ==
=== Top scorers ===
- Last updated on May 23, 2008

Rank	Player	Club	Goals
1	(Turkey) Gökhan Ünal	Kayserispor	25
2	(Turkey) Fatih Tekke	Trabzonspor	22
3	(Turkey) Cenk Işler	Kayseri Erciyesspor	20
4	(Turkey) Necati Ateş	Galatasaray	18
5	(Brazil) Mert Nobre	Fenerbahçe	17
5	(Turkey) Ümit Karan	Galatasaray	17
7	(Turkey) Umut Bulut	Ankaragücü	16
8	(Turkey) Tuncay	Fenerbahçe	15
9	(Brazil) Alex	Fenerbahçe	14
9	(Turkey) Mehmet Çakır	Gençlerbirliği	14

=== Hat-tricks ===
Player	For	Against	Result	Date
(Turkey) Ümit Karan	Galatasaray	Malatyaspor	5–2	25 August 2005
(Turkey) Semih Şentürk	Fenerbahçe	Denizlispor	6–2	17 December 2005
(Turkey) Ümit Karan	Galatasaray	Gaziantepspor	6–0	12 February 2006
(Turkey) Sinan Kaloğlu	Manisaspor	Fenerbahçe	5–3	15 April 2006
(Turkey) Fatih Tekke	Trabzonspor	Çaykur Rizespor	6–1	23 April 2006
(Turkey) Gökhan Ünal	Kayserispor	Manisaspor	7–2	6 May 2006
