= 2005–06 Trabzonspor season =

Trabzonspor
2005–06 season
- President: Atay Aktuğ
- Manager: Şenol Güneş; Vahid Halilhodžić
- Stadium: Hüseyin Avni Aker Stadium
- Süper Lig: 4th
- Turkish Cup: Group stage
- UEFA Champions League: Second qualifying round
- Top goalscorer: League: Fatih Tekke (22); All: Fatih Tekke (28)

In the 2005–06 season, Trabzonspor finished in fourth place in the Süper Lig. The top scorer of the team was Fatih Tekke, who scored 28 goals.

This article shows statistics of the club's players and matches during the season.

== Sponsor ==
- Avea

01 Jefferson

03 Fabiano Eller

05 Hüseyin Cimsir

07 Miroslaw Szymkowiak

09 Fatih Tekke

10 Mehmet Hilmi Yilmaz

11 Ibrahima Yattara

13 Eul Young Lee

18 Tayfun Cora

19 Hasan Üçünçü

20 Ufuk Bayraktar

25 Ibrahim Ege

29 Tolga Zengin

34 Emrah Eren

38 Erdinç Yavuz

47 Volkan Bekiroglu

61 Gökdeniz Karadeniz

66 Adem Koçak

99 Celaleddin Koçak

== Süper Lig ==
Pos	Team	Pld	W	D	L	GF	GA	GD	Pts	Qualification or relegation
2	Fenerbahçe	34	25	6	3	90	34	+56	81	Qualification to Champions League second qualifying round
3	Beşiktaş	34	15	9	10	52	39	+13	54	Qualification to UEFA Cup first round (Note: Beşiktaş have won the 2005–06 Turkish Cup competition and thus are qualified for the first round of the UEFA Cup.)
4	Trabzonspor	34	15	7	12	51	42	+9	52	Qualification to UEFA Cup second qualifying round
5	Kayserispor	34	15	6	13	59	42	+17	51 (Note: Kayserispor were ahead of Gençlerbirliği on head-to-head goal difference: Kayserispor–Gençlerbirliği 2–0, Gençlerbirliği–Kayserispor 3–2.)	Qualification to Intertoto Cup second round
6	Gençlerbirliği	34	14	9	11	47	39	+8	51	

Rules for classification: 1) points; 2) goal difference; 3) number of goals scored.

== Turkish Cup ==
Pos	Team	Pld	W	D	L	GF	GA	GD	Pts	KAY	DEN	TRA	ALT	FKR
1	Kayserispor	4	3	0	1	11	3	+8	9		2–3			2–0
2	Denizlispor	4	3	0	1	8	5	+3	9				2–0	2–0
3	Trabzonspor	4	3	0	1	6	5	+1	9	0–3	3–1			
4	Altay SK	4	1	0	3	2	7	−5	3	0–4		0–1		
5	Fatih Karagümrük	4	0	0	4	1	8	−7	0			1–2	0–2	

Source: tff.org.tr
Legend: Blue = home team win; Yellow = draw; Red = away team win.
Matchday One

Trabzonspor	0–3	Kayserispor

Matchday Two

Fatih Karagümrük	1–2	Trabzonspor

Matchday Four

Trabzonspor	3–1	Denizlispor

Matchday Five

Altay SK	0–1	Trabzonspor

== See also ==
- 2005–06 Süper Lig
- 2005–06 Turkish Cup
