= 2004–05 Trabzonspor season =

Trabzonspor
2004–05 season
- President: Atay Aktuğ
- Manager: Ziya Doğan; Şenol Güneş
- Stadium: Hüseyin Avni Aker Stadium
- Süper Lig: 2nd
- Turkish Cup: Semi-finals
- UEFA Champions League: Third qualifying round
- UEFA Cup: First round
- Top goalscorer: League: Fatih Tekke (31); All: Fatih Tekke (34)

In the 2004–05 season, Trabzonspor finished in second place in the Süper Lig. In the Turkish Cup, the club was eliminated in the semi-finals by Galatasaray. The top scorer of the team was Fatih Tekke, who scored 34 goals.

This article shows statistics of the club's players and matches during the season.

== Sponsor ==
- Avea

== Players ==
01 Michael Petkovic

05 Hüseyin Cimsir

06 Hasan Uçüncü

07 Miroslaw Szymkowiak

09 Fatih Tekke

10 Mehmet Hilmi Yilmaz

11 Ibrahim Yattara

13 Eul Yong Lee

14 Özgür Bayer

15 Augustine Ahinful

18 Tayfun Cora

22 Hasan Sönmez

24 Karel D'Haene

25 Ibrahim Ege

28 Tolga Seyhan

34 Emrah Eren

38 Erdinç Yavuz

47 Volkan Kürsat Bekiroglu

61 Gökdeniz Karadeniz

66 Adem Koçak

99 Celaleddin Koçak

== Süper Lig ==
Pos	Team	Pld	W	D	L	GF	GA	GD	Pts	Qualification or relegation
1	Fenerbahçe (C)	34	26	2	6	77	24	+53	80	Qualification to Champions League group stage (Note: Liverpool, winner of 2004–05 UEFA Champions League, forced to play in the UEFA Champions League first qualifying round as they cannot finish 2004–05 FA Premier League top four, so the title holder spot in the group stage became vacant and this spot goes to best excluded champions, champion of Turkey, originally qualified for the third qualifying round.)
2	Trabzonspor	34	24	5	5	73	29	+44	77	Qualification to Champions League second qualifying round
3	Galatasaray	34	24	4	6	64	25	+39	76	Qualification to UEFA Cup first round (Note: Galatasaray have won the 2004–05 Turkish Cup competition and thus are qualified for the first round of the UEFA Cup.)
4	Beşiktaş	34	20	9	5	70	39	+31	69	Qualification to UEFA Cup second qualifying round
5	Gençlerbirliği	34	14	9	11	52	41	+11	51	

Rules for classification: 1) points; 2) goal difference; 3) number of goals scored.
(C) Champions

== Turkish Cup ==
=== First round ===
Team 1	Score	Team 2
Antalyaspor	1–4	Trabzonspor

=== Second round ===
Team 1	Score	Team 2
Trabzonspor	2–0	Malatyaspor

=== Quarter-finals ===
Team 1	Score	Team 2
Trabzonspor	3–0	Gaziantepspor

=== Semi-finals ===
Team 1	Score	Team 2
Galatasaray	1–1(4–2 p)	Trabzonspor

== See also ==
- 2004–05 Süper Lig
- 2004–05 Turkish Cup
