= List of presidents of Trabzonspor =

The list of Trabzonspor presidents Since its establishment, 18 different individuals have served as the president of Trabzonspor, and the current president is Ertuğrul Doğan.

== History ==
Trabzonspor has had several influential presidents throughout its history, with many contributing significantly to the club’s trophy successes. The most successful president in the club’s history is Şamil Ekinci, who led Trabzonspor during its golden era from 1975 to 1980. Under his leadership, the club secured an astonishing 13 trophies, including four Süper Lig titles (1975–76, 1976–77, 1978–79, 1979–80), two Turkish Cups, five Turkish Super Cups, and two Prime Minister’s Cups. His tenure firmly established Trabzonspor as a dominant force in Turkish football. Another notable figure is Ahmet Ağaoğlu, who oversaw Trabzonspor’s return to glory during his presidency from 2018 to 2023. Under his guidance, the club ended a 38-year league title drought by winning the 2021–22 Süper Lig, in addition to securing one Turkish Cup and two Turkish Super Cups, for a total of four trophies. Mehmet Ali Yılmaz also played a key role in the club’s history, winning four trophies, including one Süper Lig title in 1983–84, during his multiple terms as president. Other presidents, such as Faruk Özak, who won three trophies in the mid-1990s, and Atay Aktuğ, who led the club to a Turkish Cup victory in 2003–04, contributed to Trabzonspor’s legacy. Özkan Sümer also played a key role, securing a Turkish Cup in 2002–03. Celal Ataman, Mazhar Afacan, and Sadri Şener also played significant roles, each delivering important trophies during their presidencies. Together, these leaders have shaped Trabzonspor’s history and ensured its place as one of Turkey’s most successful football clubs.

== Presidents ==
As of Below is a list of presidents of Trabzonspor

No.	President	Trabzonspor
1	Ali Osman Ulusoy	1967–1968
2	Rıfat Dedeoğlu	1968–1969
3	Ali Osman Ulusoy	1969–1970
4	Rıfat Dedeoğlu	1970–1971
5	Suat Oyman	1971–1972
6	Salih Erdem	1972–1975
7	Şamil Ekinci	1975–1980
8	Celal Ataman	1980–1981
9	Mustafa Günaydın	1981–1982
10	Mehmet Ali Yılmaz	1982–1988
11	Mazhar Afacan	1988–1989
12	Mehmet Ali Yılmaz	1989–1992
13	Sadri Şener	1992–1994
14	Faruk Nafiz Özak	1994–1997
15	Mehmet Ali Yılmaz	1997–2000
16	Özkan Sümer	2000–2003
17	Atay Aktuğ	2003–2006
18	Nuri Albayrak	2006–2008
19	Sadri Şener	2008–2013
20	İbrahim Hacıosmanoğlu	2013–2015
21	Muharrem Usta	2015–2018
22	Ahmet Ağaoğlu	2018–2023
23	Ertuğrul Doğan	2023–

== Honours ==
Rank	President	SL	1L	TC	TSC	PMC	Total
1	Şamil Ekinci	4	0	2	5	2	13
2	Ahmet Ağaoğlu	1	0	1	2	0	4
3	Mehmet Ali Yılmaz	1	0	1	1	1	4
4	Özkan Sümer	0	0	1	0	0	1
5	Atay Aktuğ	0	0	1	0	0	1
6	Sadri Şener	0	0	1	1	0	2
7	Faruk Özak	0	0	1	1	2	4
8	Celal Ataman	1	0	0	0	0	1
9	Mazhar Afacan	0	0	1	0	0	1
10	Salih Erdem	0	1	0	0	0	0
