= Kabongo =

Kabongo may refer to:

- Kabongo (surname), a surname of Democratic Republic of the Congo origin
- Kabongo, Democratic Republic of the Congo, a town
- Kabongo Territory, in the Democratic Republic of the Congo
