= Kabongo (surname) =

Kabongo is a surname of Democratic Republic of the Congo origin. Notable people with the surname include:

- Christian Kabongo (born 1990), Canadian basketball player
- Christophe Kabongo (born 2003), Czech footballer
- Dieudonné Kabongo (1950–2011), Congolese-born Belgian comedian, humorist, musician and actor
- Emmanuel Kabongo (born 1986), Canadian actor and producer
- Eugène Kabongo (born 1960), Congolese footballer
- Honore Kabongo (born 1985), Rwandan footballer
- Joel Kabongo (born 1998), Danish footballer
- Mutamba Kabongo (born 1970), Congolese footballer
- Myck Kabongo (born 1992), Congolese-Canadian basketball player
- Patrick Kabongo (born 1979), Congolese-Canadian football offensive lineman
