= Zdravko Lazarov =

Bulgarian footballer

Zdravko Lazarov Ivanov
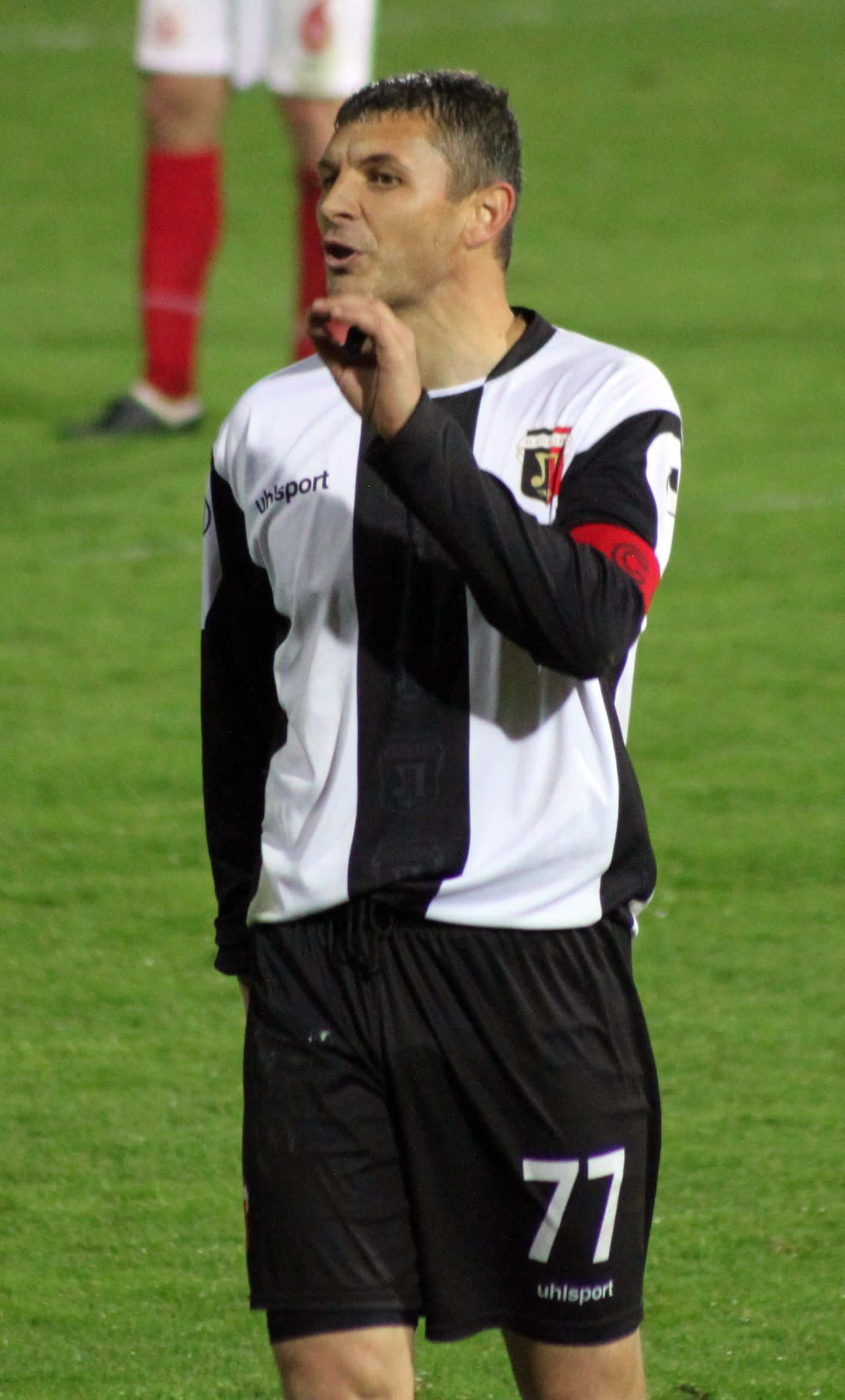
- Lazarov with Lokomotiv Plovdiv in 2010

Personal information
- Full name: Zdravko Ivanov Lazarov
- Date of birth: 20 February 1976 (age 50)
- Place of birth: Septemvri, Bulgaria
- Height: 1.77 m (5 ft 9 1/2 in)
- Position: Winger

Youth career
- Lokomotiv Septemvri

Senior career*
Years	Team	Apps	(Gls)
1991–1992	Lokomotiv Septemvri	14	(3)
1992–1995	Yantra Gabrovo	48	(16)
1993–1994	→ Loko Septemvri (loan)	7	(0)
1995	CSKA Sofia	8	(0)
1996–1997	Yantra Gabrovo	40	(19)
1997–1998	Minyor Pernik	22	(7)
1998–1999	Levski Sofia	27	(3)
1999–2000	Slavia Sofia	28	(8)
2000–2003	Kocaelispor	79	(24)
2003–2006	Gaziantepspor	87	(36)
2006–2007	Erciyesspor	31	(9)
2007	Slavia Sofia	7	(4)
2008	Shinnik Yaroslavl	14	(2)
2008–2009	CSKA Sofia	15	(2)
2009	Cherno More	10	(0)
2010–2012	Lokomotiv Plovdiv	67	(23)
2012–2013	Slavia Sofia	27	(4)
2013–2014	Lokomotiv Plovdiv	30	(3)
2014–2016	Montana	47	(7)
2016–2017	Hebar Pazardzhik	21	(5)
2017–2018	Lokomotiv Septemvri	?	(?)
2018	FC Bratsigovo	?	(?)
2019–2020	Lokomotiv Septemvri	?	(?)

International career
2003–2011	Bulgaria	31	(3)

Managerial career
- 2016–2017: Hebar Pazardzhik (assistant)
- 2018–2021: Vihren Sandanski
- * Club domestic league appearances and goals as of 10 June 2016

Zdravko Lazarov (Bulgarian: Здравко Лазаров; born 20 February 1976) is a Bulgarian professional football coach and a former player.

Lazarov's professional playing career as a winger spanned nearly 30 years, during which he played for 15 different clubs in Bulgaria, Turkey and Russia.

Lazarov was capped 31 times for the Bulgaria national team, scoring 3 times. He appeared in the 2004 UEFA European Championship.

== Career ==
Lazarov started his career in his home town Septemvri in the local team FC Locomotiv Septemvri. After that, Lazarov played for Chardafon Gabrovo (now FC Yantra). After two very good seasons, he signed with Bulgarian grand CSKA Sofia. He did not impress with his performance and was sold to Minyor Pernik. In June 1998, Lazarov signed with the other Bulgarian grand Levski Sofia. Between 1999 and 2001 he played for Slavia Sofia. After that, he went in the Turkish Süper Lig where he played for Kocaelispor, Gaziantepspor and Kayseri Erciyesspor. For six seasons in Turkey he played in 202 games and scored 76 goals.

In July 2007, Zdravko returned in Bulgaria and signed with Slavia Sofia. After spending half a season with Slavia and participating in 11 games, in which he scored 8 goals, in December 2007, he signed with the Russian side Shinnik Yaroslavl. In 2008, he returned to Bulgaria, playing for CSKA Sofia once more. He scored 2 goals in 15 games before getting sidelined for six months due to an injury in the game against Litex Lovech. On 11 June 2009 he terminated his contract with CSKA with immediate effect after a meeting with the club's bosses.

On 15 June 2009, Lazarov signed with Cherno More Varna for two years. He took number 11, which at that time was worn by Georgi Kakalov, but Kakalov stepped it back to Lazarov. He made his team début on 7 July, in a friendly game against Levski Sofia.

In January 2010, Lazarov completed his move to Lokomotiv Plovdiv on a free transfer. He made his league debut for Lokomotiv on 27 February in a 3–2 away loss against CSKA Sofia, scoring a two penalties. Lazarov was promoted to club captain at the start of the 2010–11 season. During the entire season, he scored 14 goals in the league. On 15 March 2012, Lazarov scored the winning goal against Levski Sofia (in the extra time) in a 1/4 final match of the Bulgarian Cup. On 7 August 2012, his contract was terminated.

Two days later, Lazarov joined Slavia Sofia for the third time in his career.

Lazarov played for Hebar Pazardzhik for one season at the non-professional level but left the club in June 2017.

== Managerial career ==
In 2016–17 season, Lazarov was the playing assistant manager of Bulgarian Third League side Hebar Pazardzhik.

On 27 August 2018, Lazarov was appointed manager of Bulgarian Third League club Vihren Sandanski. In his first season, he led the club to third place in the South-West Third League.

== Career statistics ==
=== Club ===
Club	League	Season	League		Cup		Continental		Other		Total	
Club	League	Season	Apps	Goals	Apps	Goals	Apps	Goals	Apps	Goals	Apps	Goals
CSKA Sofia	A Group	1995–96	8	0	1	0	—		2 (Note: Cup of PFL)	0	11	0
Minyor Pernik	A Group	1997–98	22	7	0	0	—		—		22	7
Levski Sofia	A Group	1998–99	23	3	2	0	3	2	—		28	5
Levski Sofia	A Group	1999–00	4	0	0	0	2	0	—		6	0
Slavia Sofia	A Group	1999–00	20	6	0	0	—		—		20	6
Slavia Sofia	A Group	2000–01	8	2	0	0	—		—		8	2
Kocaelispor	Süper Lig	2000–01	24	8	2	2	—		—		26	10
Kocaelispor	Süper Lig	2001–02	32	9	4	2	—		—		36	11
Kocaelispor	Süper Lig	2002–03	24	7	3	0	2	0	—		29	7
Gaziantepspor	Süper Lig	2003–04	31	12	3	1	—		—		34	13
Gaziantepspor	Süper Lig	2004–05	28	13	2	0	—		—		30	13
Gaziantepspor	Süper Lig	2005–06	28	11	5	0	—		—		33	11
Erciyesspor	Süper Lig	2006–07	31	9	6	2	—		—		37	11
Slavia Sofia	A Group	2007–08	7	4	2	0	—		—		9	4
Shinnik Yaroslavl	Premier League	2008	14	2	0	0	—		—		14	2
CSKA Sofia	A Group	2008–09	15	2	0	0	0	0	—		15	2
Cherno More	A Group	2009–10	10	0	0	0	3	0	—		13	0
Lokomotiv Plovdiv	A Group	2009–10	14	5	0	0	—		—		14	5
Lokomotiv Plovdiv	A Group	2010–11	29	14	2	1	—		—		31	15
Lokomotiv Plovdiv	A Group	2011–12	24	4	3	1	—		—		27	5
Lokomotiv Plovdiv	A Group	2012–13	0	0	0	0	2	2	1 (Note: 2012 Bulgarian Supercup)	0	3	2
Slavia Sofia	A Group	2012–13	27	4	6	1	—		—		33	5
Lokomotiv Plovdiv	A Group	2013–14	30	3	3	1	—		—		33	4
Montana	B Group	2014–15	28	7	3	0	—		—		31	7
Montana	A Group	2015–16	19	0	2	0	—		—		21	0
Hebar	Third League	2016–17	21	5	0	0	—		—		21	5
Career statistics			57	4	49	11	12	4	3	0	60	5

=== National team ===
Bulgaria national team
Year	Apps	Goals
2003	1	0
2004	10	1
2005	11	1
2006	2	0
2007	2	0
2008	4	1
2011	1	0
Total	31	3

=== International goals ===
Scores and results list Bulgaria's goal tally first.

No	Date	Venue	Opponent	Score	Result	Competition
1.	28 April 2004	Vasil Levski National Stadium, Sofia, Bulgaria	Cameroon	3–0	3–0	Friendly
2.	8 October 2005	Vasil Levski National Stadium, Sofia, Bulgaria	Hungary	2–0	2–0	2006 FIFA World Cup qualification
3.	26 March 2008	Vasil Levski National Stadium, Sofia, Bulgaria	Finland	1–1	2–1	Friendly

== Honours ==
=== Club ===
Kocaelispor

- Turkish Cup (1): 2001–02

Kayseri Erciyesspor

- Turkish Cup Runner-up: 2006–07
