= Miikka Multaharju =

Finnish footballer (born 1977)

Personal information
- Full name: Miikka Aleksi Multaharju
- Date of birth: 9 October 1977 (age 49)
- Place of birth: Lappeenranta, Finland
- Height: 1.83 m (6 ft 0 in)
- Position: Midfielder

Team information
- Current team: MyPa
- Number: 2

Senior career*
Years	Team	Apps	(Gls)
1995	Rakuunat Lappeenranta	13	(2)
1996	Joutsenon Kullervo	15	(0)
1997–2003	MyPa	159	(19)
2004–2005	Denizlispor	87	(6)
2006–2007	Fredrikstad FK	18	(0)
2008	HJK Helsinki	13	(0)
2009	MyPa	17	(0)

International career^{‡}
2003–2005	Finland	6	(0)
- * Club domestic league appearances and goals as of 12 October 2009 ‡ National team caps and goals as of 17 December 2009

Miikka Multaharju (born 9 October 1977) is a Finnish former professional footballer.

He has played for Fredrikstad in the Norwegian Premier League, Denizlispor in the Süper Lig and HJK Helsinki and MyPa in the Finnish Veikkausliiga.

== Career statistics ==
=== Club ===
Appearances and goals by club, season and competition
Club	Season	League			Domestic Cups (Note: Includes Suomen Cup and Finnish League Cup)		Europe		Total	
Club	Season	Division	Apps	Goals	Apps	Goals	Apps	Goals	Apps	Goals
MyPa	1997	Veikkausliiga	7	0	0	0	1 (Note: Includes UEFA Cup)	0	7	0
MyPa	1998	Veikkausliiga	24	2	0	0	–		24	2
MyPa	1999	Veikkausliiga	26	2	0	0	–		26	2
MyPa	2000	Veikkausliiga	31	2	0	0	2 (Note: Includes UEFA Intertoto Cup)	0	33	2
MyPa	2001	Veikkausliiga	30	2	0	0	2	0	32	2
MyPa	2002	Veikkausliiga	29	10	0	0	2	0	31	10
MyPa	2003	Veikkausliiga	12	1	–		–		12	1
MyPa	Total		159	19	0	0	7	0	166	19
Denizlispor	2003–04	Süper Lig	34	2	3	0	–		37	2
Denizlispor	2004–05	Süper Lig	31	2	3	0	–		34	2
Denizlispor	2005–06	Süper Lig	21	2	7	0	–		28	2
Denizlispor	Total		86	6	13	0	0	0	99	6
Fredrikstad	2006	Tippeligaen	3	0	0	0	–		3	0
Fredrikstad	2007	Tippeligaen	15	0	0	0	1	0	16	0
Fredrikstad	Total		18	0	0	0	1	0	19	0
HJK	2008	Veikkausliiga	13	0	1	0	0	0	14	0
MyPa	2009	Veikkausliiga	17	0	6	1	–		23	1
Career total			293	25	20	0	8	0	321	25

=== International ===
As of match played 9 February 2005

Finland
Year	Apps	Goals
2003	2	0
2004	3	0
2005	1	0
Total	6	0

== Honours ==
- Norwegian Football Cup:1
  - 2006
