= Faryd Mondragón =

Colombian footballer (born 1971)

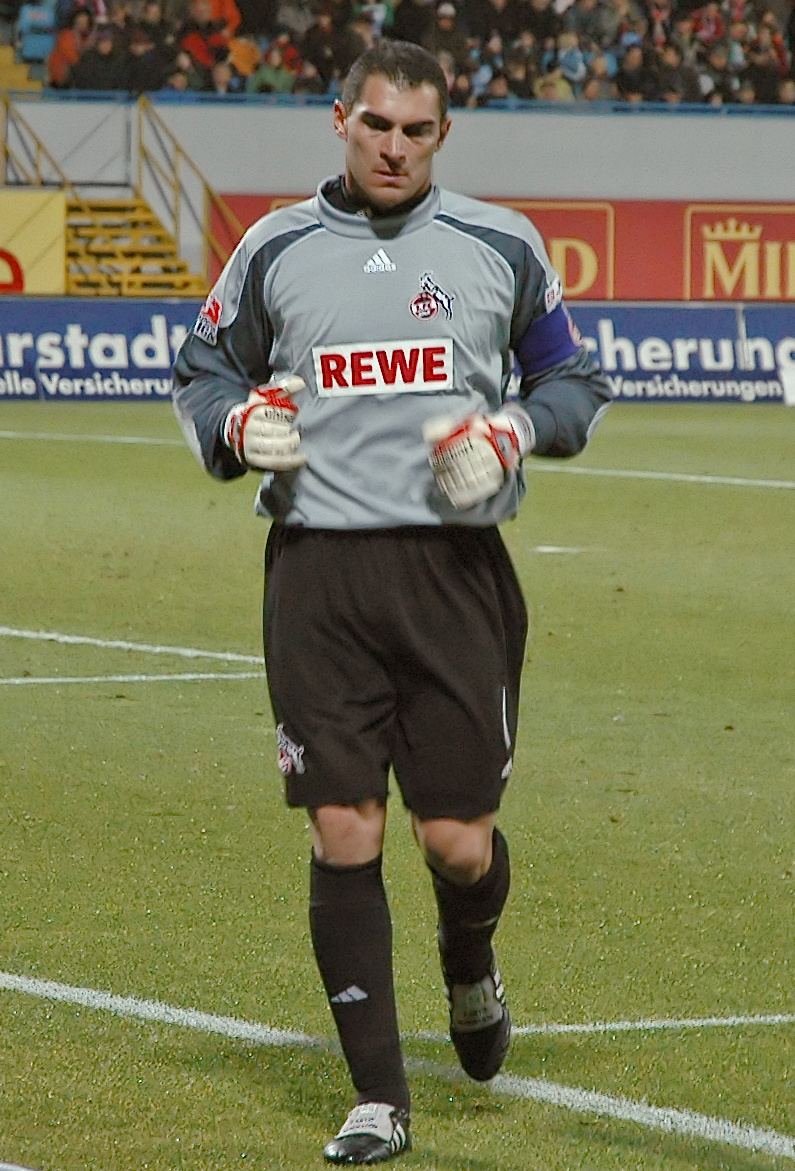
- Mondragón with 1. FC Köln in 2008

Personal information
- Full name: Faryd Camilo Mondragón Alí
- Date of birth: 21 June 1971 (age 55)
- Place of birth: Cali, Colombia
- Height: 1.91 m (6 ft 3 in)
- Position: Goalkeeper

Senior career*
| Years | Team | Apps | (Gls) |
| 1990–1991 | Deportivo Cali | 1 | (0) |
| 1991–1992 | Real Cartagena | 15 | (0) |
| 1992–1993 | Santa Fe | 2 | (0) |
| 1992–1993 | → Cerro Porteño (loan) | 11 | (0) |
| 1993–1994 | Argentinos Juniors | 21 | (0) |
| 1994–1995 | Independiente | 0 | (0) |
| 1995 | Santa Fe | 30 | (0) |
| 1995–2000 | Independiente | 119 | (1) |
| 1999 | → Real Zaragoza (loan) | 13 | (0) |
| 2000–2001 | Metz | 30 | (0) |
| 2001–2007 | Galatasaray | 185 | (0) |
| 2007–2011 | 1. FC Köln | 106 | (0) |
| 2011–2012 | Philadelphia Union | 27 | (0) |
| 2012–2014 | Deportivo Cali | 78 | (0) |
| Total | | 638 | (1) |

International career
| 1993–2014 | Colombia | 51 | (0) |
- * Club domestic league appearances and goals

Faryd Camilo Mondragón Alí (born 21 June 1971) is a Colombian former professional footballer who played as a goalkeeper.

In a club career that started and ended at his hometown club Deportivo Cali, Mondragón also had two spells at Argentine club Independiente. In European football, he had brief spells with Zaragoza in La Liga and Metz in Ligue 1, as well as a full decade split between Galatasaray in the Turkish Süper Lig and 1. FC Köln in the Bundesliga.

In a 21-year international career that started in 1993, he played 51 times for the Colombia national team. He was named in the Colombia squads for the 1992 Olympics, two Copa América tournaments, two CONCACAF Gold Cups, and the World Cups of 1994, 1998 and 2014. On 24 June 2014, Mondragón became the oldest player to play a FIFA World Cup match at the age of 43 years and 3 days, a record that was broken four years later by 45-year-old Egyptian goalkeeper Essam El Hadary.

== Club career ==
=== Early career ===
Born in Cali, Mondragón began his career began at hometown club Deportivo Cali, and he moved to Independiente Santa Fe and then Cerro Porteño in Paraguay. Mondragon held a contract with Cerro Porteño until May 1993. His deal Cerro Porteño was a six-month loan with the option to buy for US$700,000. During his stay at Cerro Porteño, he lived in the Hotel Excelsior in Asunción. In the 1993 Cerro Porteño team, he played with Paraguayans Carlos Gamarra, Francisco Arce, Estanislao Struway, Virgilio Ferreira, Ecuadorian Luis Capurro and Brazilians Alex Rossi, Silvio Wielewski, Carlos Antonio Chaves and Luís Carlos Carvalho dos Reis. On 23 March 1993, it was announced that Mondragón would join Argentine club River Plate when Cerro Porteño finished its participation in the Copa Libertadores. Following a Copa Libertadores game for Cerro Porteno against Newell's Old Boys in Rosario, Mondragón flew to Buenos Aires to sign his contract and Cerro Porteño discarded the possibility of permanently signing him because the cost was too high.

Mondragón joined the Argentine first division side Argentinos Juniors in 1993, and then made his international debut for Colombia. The following year he moved to Independiente where he won, among other titles, the 1995 Supercopa Libertadores against Flamengo. Apart from some brief periods, he largely stood at the club until 2001.

At the end of 1998, Mondragón signed on loan for Real Zaragoza in Spain's La Liga. He was unable to take the starting place from established goalkeeper Juanmi during his brief spell in Aragon.

=== Metz and Galatasaray ===
Mondragón played for Metz in the French Ligue 1 during the 2000–01 season. In December 2000 he was investigated for the Greek passport he was using to bypass the league's quota of non-European Union players. The following April, he was convicted of falsification of documents and fined 300,000 French francs (€45,000) as well as being banned from France for two years, all as a suspended sentence. Toulouse and Marseille appealed to the league that Mondragón played against them in May, but their concerns were dismissed as they had not raised concerns about his presence on the matchday sheets; Metz had avoided relegation at Toulouse's expense.

From 2001 to 2007, Mondragón played for Galatasaray in the Turkish Süper Lig, winning two titles and a Turkish Cup. In recognition of his achievements, in 2015 he was made Turkey's honorary consul in Colombia, on the request of the Turkish president, Recep Tayyip Erdoğan.

=== Later career ===
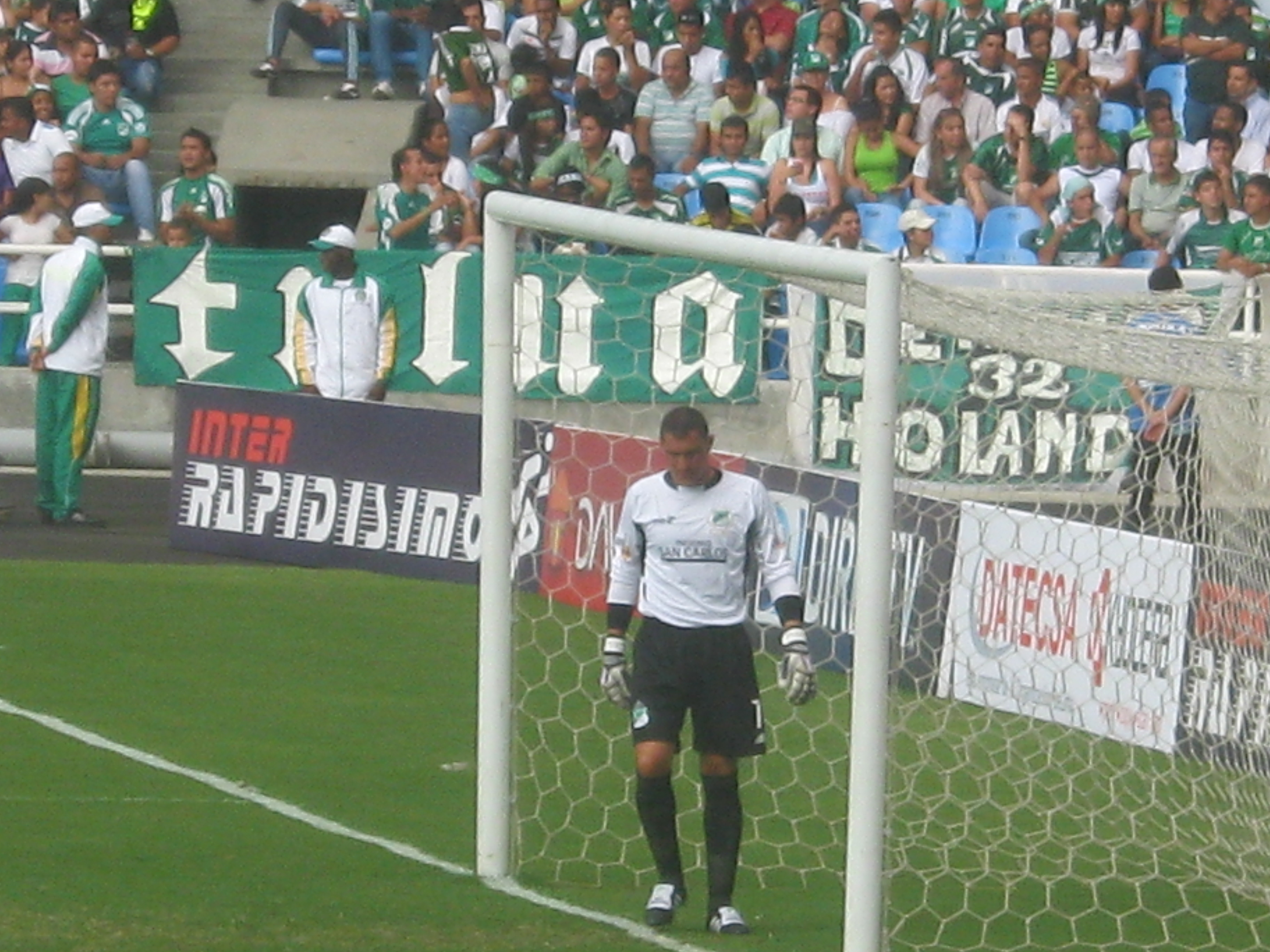
Mondragón in his second spell at Deportivo Cali

Mondragón transferred from Istanbul to 1. FC Köln in May 2007. After arriving at his new club, he was forced to compete with established Köln goalkeeper Stefan Wessels for a spot in the starting eleven. One of the reasons that he chose 1. FC Köln it was because the current coach Christoph Daum was working there. After an intense pre-season, Mondragón was named as the new number one for 1. FC Köln. This resulted in Wessels leaving the club for Everton in England. Since Wessels departure, Mondragón established a first choice goalkeeper for the club until Mondragón was relegated to the bench after an altercation with Zvonimir Soldo over his desire to go on international duty. This resulted in Mondragón being sent home from the team hotel and being replaced by young Croatian stopper Miro Varvodić.

His contract with Köln was terminated with effect from 31 December 2010, the reason being Mondragón's desire to play in the MLS.

He spent the 2011 season with Philadelphia Union of Major League Soccer, where he was successful in providing leadership to a young team. On 30 January 2012, Deportivo Cali announced Mondragón had signed a one-year contract to finish his career with his original professional club. Two years later, in March 2014, he played his final match in the Copa Libertadores against Argentine side Lanús, which led to some news outlets to wrongly claim that Mondragón had become, at the age of 42 years, 8 months, and 28 days, the oldest player in the competition's history, a record that was later broken by Zé Roberto in 2017 (43); however, the record had already been set by Luis Galarza in 1995, aged 44. He retired after two and a half seasons back at the club.

== International career ==
=== Early career ===
Mondragón was selected for the 1992 Olympic tournament. He made his full international debut against Venezuela in a 1–1 friendly home draw on 21 May 1993. He was selected for the Colombia national team at the 1994 FIFA World Cup and the Copa América of 1993 and 1997. Profiting from the absence of regular goalkeeper René Higuita, he played at the latter tournament in Bolivia, which ended with quarter-final elimination to the host team.

=== 1998 World Cup ===
During the 1998 FIFA World Cup in France, Mondragón started in goal for all three of Colombia's games, including the final group match against England. Despite conceding two goals, he made some impressive saves and in doing so kept the score down to 2–0, with the BBC's South American football correspondent Tim Vickery saying that Mondragón was "single-handedly responsible for the fact that England did not run up a cricket score". At the end of the game, Mondragón broke down in tears (as the match decided who would go through to the next round after Romania) and David Seaman, England's goalkeeper, did his best to console him. According to German footballing legend Franz Beckenbauer, Mondragón had been the best goalkeeper of the first round.

=== 1998–2014 ===
At the 2003 CONCACAF Gold Cup, Mondragón was in goal for three games, including the 2–0 quarter-final loss to Brazil. Two years later, he played all five games in a run to the semi-finals, including the 2–1 quarter-final win over reigning champions Mexico at the NRG Arena.

After the latter Gold Cup, Mondragón was recalled to the Colombia team in September 2010 for friendlies against Ecuador and the United States in the latter country; he was 39. He started against the latter on 12 October, in a goalless draw.

=== 2014 World Cup ===
Along with Carlos Valderrama, the country's most capped player, Mondragón is the only Colombian to have participated in five FIFA World Cup qualification campaigns. In 2010, he was recalled to the Colombian squad at the age of 39 after a five-year absence from international football. In 2014, he was named in Colombia's squad for the 2014 FIFA World Cup, making him the oldest player at the tournament, and in World Cup history, at the age of 43, and the only squad member from the 1994 FIFA World Cup. He is also the only player to have participated in 6 different World Cup qualifying campaigns since 1993. By coming on as a substitute in the 85th minute of the final group game against Japan on 24 June 2014, he became the oldest player ever to play in a World Cup game at the age of 43 years and 3 days old, surpassing the record set by Roger Milla for Cameroon at the 1994 World Cup. Mondragón gave an interview afterwards, expressing his gratitude to have been given the opportunity to represent Colombia one last time at a World Cup. His record for oldest player in World Cup history was broken four years later at the 2018 World Cup by 45-year-old Egyptian goalkeeper Essam El-Hadary. Since Mondragón's last World Cup finals appearance prior to 2014 was in 1998, he also set a record for longest gap (16 years) between two finals appearances.

After Colombia's elimination to the host country Brazil in the quarter-finals, Mondragón officially confirmed his retirement from football and thanked the fans and nation for the support after stating, "This is my last stadium as a professional player. I'm proud to be part of this wonderful group. Thank you all for the years of support.".

== Personal life ==
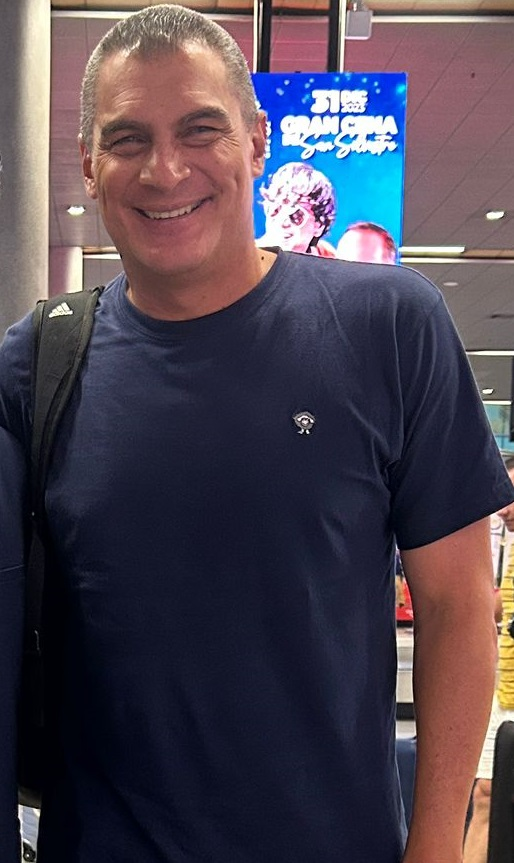
Mondragón (2023)

Mondragón is of Lebanese descent. Mondragón was nicknamed "El Turco" ("The Turk"), a name given in Latin America to people descending from the Turkish-governed Ottoman Empire, regardless of their ethnicity. His first name Faryd means "unique or unmatched" in Arabic. He is a Maronite and has said so publicly along with making the sign of the cross on multiple occasions before matches.

== Career statistics ==
=== Club ===
Appearances and goals by club, season and competition
| Club | Season | League | | | National cup | | League cup | | Continental | | Other | | Total | |
| Club | Season | Division | Apps | Goals | Apps | Goals | Apps | Goals | Apps | Goals | Apps | Goals | Apps | Goals |
|---|---|---|---|---|---|---|---|---|---|---|---|---|---|---|
| Deportivo Cali | 1990 | Categoría Primera A | 0 | 0 | 0 | 0 | — | | — | | — | | 0 | 0 |
| Deportivo Cali | 1991 | Categoría Primera A | 1 | 0 | 0 | 0 | — | | — | | — | | 1 | 0 |
| Deportivo Cali | Total | | 1 | 0 | 0 | 0 | — | | — | | — | | 1 | 0 |
| Real Cartagena | 1992 | Categoría Primera A | 15 | 0 | 0 | 0 | — | | — | | — | | 15 | 0 |
| Santa Fe | 1992 | Categoría Primera A | 2 | 0 | 0 | 0 | — | | — | | — | | 2 | 0 |
| Cerro Porteño (loan) | 1993 | Paraguayan Primera División | 11 | 0 | 0 | 0 | 0 | 0 | 12 | 0 | — | | 23 | 0 |
| Argentinos Juniors | 1993–94 | Argentine Primera División | 21 | 0 | 0 | 0 | — | | — | | — | | 21 | 0 |
| Independiente | 1994–95 | Argentine Primera División | 0 | 0 | 0 | 0 | — | | — | | — | | 0 | 0 |
| Santa Fe | 1995 | Categoría Primera A | 30 | 0 | 0 | 0 | — | | — | | — | | 30 | 0 |
| Independiente | 1995–96 | Argentine Primera División | 27 | 0 | 0 | 0 | — | | 1 | 0 | — | | 28 | 0 |
| Independiente | 1996–97 | Argentine Primera División | 33 | 0 | 0 | 0 | — | | — | | — | | 33 | 0 |
| Independiente | 1997–98 | Argentine Primera División | 26 | 1 | 0 | 0 | — | | 5 | 0 | — | | 31 | 1 |
| Independiente | 1998–99 | Argentine Primera División | 17 | 0 | 0 | 0 | — | | — | | — | | 17 | 0 |
| Independiente | Total | | 103 | 1 | 0 | 0 | — | | 6 | 0 | — | | 109 | 1 |
| Real Zaragoza | 1998–99 | La Liga | 13 | 0 | 0 | 0 | — | | — | | — | | 13 | 0 |
| Independiente | 1999–00 | Argentine Primera División | 16 | 0 | 0 | 0 | — | | — | | — | | 16 | 0 |
| Metz | 2000–01 | Ligue 1 | 30 | 0 | 0 | 0 | 0 | 0 | — | | — | | 30 | 0 |
| Galatasaray | 2001–02 | Süper Lig | 28 | 0 | 0 | 0 | — | | 15 | 0 | — | | 43 | 0 |
| Galatasaray | 2002–03 | Süper Lig | 32 | 0 | 1 | 0 | — | | 6 | 0 | — | | 39 | 0 |
| Galatasaray | 2003–04 | Süper Lig | 27 | 0 | 1 | 0 | — | | 10 | 0 | — | | 38 | 0 |
| Galatasaray | 2004–05 | Süper Lig | 34 | 0 | 4 | 0 | — | | 0 | 0 | — | | 38 | 0 |
| Galatasaray | 2005–06 | Süper Lig | 34 | 0 | 2 | 0 | — | | 2 | 0 | — | | 38 | 0 |
| Galatasaray | 2006–07 | Süper Lig | 30 | 0 | 3 | 0 | — | | 6 | 0 | 1 (Note: Appearance in Turkish Super Cup) | 0 | 40 | 0 |
| Galatasaray | Total | | 185 | 0 | 11 | 0 | — | | 41 | 0 | 1 | 0 | 238 | 0 |
| 1. FC Köln | 2007–08 | Bundesliga | 31 | 0 | 0 | 0 | — | | — | | — | | 31 | 0 |
| 1. FC Köln | 2008–09 | Bundesliga | 31 | 0 | 2 | 0 | — | | — | | — | | 33 | 0 |
| 1. FC Köln | 2009–10 | Bundesliga | 32 | 0 | 4 | 0 | — | | — | | — | | 36 | 0 |
| 1. FC Köln | 2010–11 | Bundesliga | 12 | 0 | 2 | 0 | — | | — | | — | | 14 | 0 |
| 1. FC Köln | Total | | 106 | 0 | 8 | 0 | — | | — | | — | | 114 | 0 |
| Philadelphia Union | 2011 | MLS | 27 | 0 | 1 | 0 | 2 | 0 | — | | — | | 30 | 0 |
| Deportivo Cali | 2012 | Categoría Primera A | 33 | 0 | 1 | 0 | — | | — | | — | | 34 | 0 |
| Deportivo Cali | 2013 | Categoría Primera A | 40 | 0 | 0 | 0 | — | | — | | — | | 40 | 0 |
| Deportivo Cali | 2014 | Categoría Primera A | 5 | 0 | 0 | 0 | — | | 5 | 0 | — | | 10 | 0 |
| Deportivo Cali | Total | | 78 | 0 | 1 | 0 | — | | 5 | 0 | — | | 84 | 0 |
| Career total | | | 638 | 1 | 21 | 0 | 2 | 0 | 64 | 0 | 1 | 0 | 726 | 1 |

=== International ===
Appearances and goals by national team and year
| National team | Year | Apps | Goals |
|---|---|---|---|
| Colombia | 1993 | 2 | 0 |
| Colombia | 1994 | 0 | 0 |
| Colombia | 1995 | 2 | 0 |
| Colombia | 1996 | 9 | 0 |
| Colombia | 1997 | 8 | 0 |
| Colombia | 1998 | 5 | 0 |
| Colombia | 1999 | 0 | 0 |
| Colombia | 2000 | 0 | 0 |
| Colombia | 2001 | 3 | 0 |
| Colombia | 2002 | 0 | 0 |
| Colombia | 2003 | 7 | 0 |
| Colombia | 2004 | 0 | 0 |
| Colombia | 2005 | 8 | 0 |
| Colombia | 2006 | 0 | 0 |
| Colombia | 2007 | 0 | 0 |
| Colombia | 2008 | 0 | 0 |
| Colombia | 2009 | 0 | 0 |
| Colombia | 2010 | 1 | 0 |
| Colombia | 2011 | 0 | 0 |
| Colombia | 2012 | 1 | 0 |
| Colombia | 2013 | 2 | 0 |
| Colombia | 2014 | 3 | 0 |
| Total | | 51 | 0 |

== Honours ==
Independiente

- Recopa Sudamericana: 1995
- Supercopa Libertadores: 1995

Galatasaray

- Süper Lig: 2001–02, 2005–06
- Turkish Cup: 2004–05

Deportivo Cali

- Superliga Colombiana: 2014

== See also ==
- FIFA World Cup records
