= Ernani Pereira =

Brazilian-born Azerbaijani footballer (born 1978)

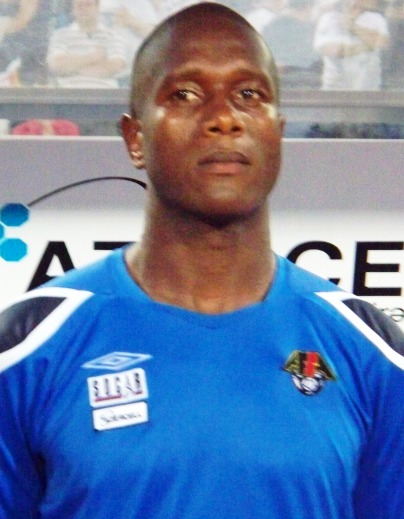

Personal information
- Full name: Ernani Pereira
- Date of birth: 22 January 1978 (age 48)
- Place of birth: Belo Horizonte (MG), Brazil
- Height: 1.87 m (6 ft 1 1/2 in)
- Position: Defender

Senior career*
Years	Team	Apps	(Gls)
1998–1999	Vila Nova		
2000	Cruzeiro		
2001–2003	Guarani		
2003–2005	Konyaspor	21	(1)
2005–2010	FK Karvan	101	(2)
2007	→ Orduspor (loan)	16	(0)
2010–2011	Mersin İdmanyurdu	17	(0)

International career^{‡}
2006–2011	Azerbaijan	12	(0)
- * Club domestic league appearances and goals as of 23 June 2014 ‡ National team caps and goals as of 1 December 2009

Ernani Pereira (born 22 January 1978 in Belo Horizonte, Brazil) is a retired footballer who played as a defender. Born in Brazil, Pereira represented the Azerbaijan national football team.

== International ==
He made his national team debut against Portugal on 7 October 2006 where Azerbaijan lost 3–0.

== Career statistics ==
Club performance			League		Cup		Continental		Total	
Season	Club	League	Apps	Goals	Apps	Goals	Apps	Goals	Apps	Goals
2003–04	Konyaspor	Süper Lig	9	0	2	0	—		11	0
2004–05	Konyaspor	Süper Lig	12	1	1	0	—		13	1
2005–06	FK Karvan	Azerbaijan Premier League	26	1					26	1
2006–07	FK Karvan	Azerbaijan Premier League	16	0			4	0	20	0
2006–07	Orduspor (loan)	TFF First League	16	0			—		16	0
2007–08	FK Karvan	Azerbaijan Premier League	13	0			—		13	0
2008–09	FK Karvan	Azerbaijan Premier League	24	0			—		24	0
2009–10	FK Karvan	Azerbaijan Premier League	22	1			—		22	1
2010–11	Mersin İdmanyurdu	TFF First League	17	0	1	0	—		18	0
Total	Turkey		54	1	4	0	0	0	58	1
Total	Azerbaijan		101	2			4	0	105	2
Career total			155	3	4	0	4	0	163	3
