= Stjepan Tomas =

Croatian footballer (born 1976)

Personal information
- Date of birth: 6 March 1976 (age 50)
- Place of birth: Bugojno, SR Bosnia and Herzegovina, SFR Yugoslavia
- Height: 1.86 m (6 ft 1 in)
- Position: Centre-back

Youth career
- –1994: Iskra Bugojno

Senior career*
Years	Team	Apps	(Gls)
1994–1995	Istra Pula	24	(0)
1995–2000	Dinamo Zagreb	92	(2)
2000–2003	Vicenza	48	(0)
2002–2003	→ Como (loan)	26	(0)
2003–2004	Como	0	(0)
2003–2004	→ Fenerbahçe (loan)	27	(0)
2004–2007	Galatasaray	98	(0)
2007–2010	Rubin Kazan	31	(0)
2010	Gaziantepspor	4	(0)
2010	Bucaspor	9	(0)
Total		359	(2)

International career
1993	Croatia U17	2	(0)
1993–1994	Croatia U18	2	(0)
1993–1994	Croatia U19	4	(0)
1995	Croatia U20	5	(0)
1995–1997	Croatia U21	9	(0)
1998–2006	Croatia	49	(1)

Managerial career
- 2014–2015: Gaziantepspor (assistant)
- 2015–2016: Sivasspor (assistant)
- 2016–2017: Göztepe (assistant)
- 2017–2018: Akhisar Belediyespor (assistant)
- 2018–2019: Çaykur Rizespor (assistant)
- 2019: İstanbul Başakşehir (assistant)
- 2019: Antalyaspor
- 2020–2021: Çaykur Rizespor
- 2022: Göztepe
- 2022: Sheriff Tiraspol
- 2023: Osijek
- 2024–2025: Al-Okhdood
- 2026: Oțelul Galați
- * Club domestic league appearances and goals

Stjepan Tomas (born 6 March 1976) is a Croatian professional football manager and former player.

== Club career ==
In August 2007, Tomas signed a two-year contract with Russian club Rubin Kazan, for a fee of €4.8 million. On 31 January 2010, he signed a contract with Turkish side Gaziantepspor until the end of the season. Then he moved to Bucaspor, a newly promoted Süper Lig team.

== International career ==
Tomas made his debut for Croatia in an April 1998 friendly match against Poland, coming on as a 60th-minute substitute for Tomislav Rukavina, and earned a total of 49 caps, scoring 1 goal. He was part of the team at the 2002 FIFA World Cup, where he played in all three games in the group stage before they were eliminated. He was also on the national squad at the Euro 2004, but did not play in any games. He also played for the national team in their third and last game at the 2006 FIFA World Cup against Australia, which became his final international appearance.

== Managerial career ==
On 15 November 2019, Tomas was appointed manager of Turkish Süper Lig club Antalyaspor.

On 21 June 2022, Tomas was appointed as Head Coach of Moldovan Super Liga club Sheriff Tiraspol. Four months later, on 25 October 2022, Tomas resigned from the role following the clubs first League defeat of the season, to Petrocub Hîncești, and two days before an away trip to Manchester United in the UEFA Europa League.

On 22 July 2024, Tomas was appointed as manager of Saudi Pro League club Al-Okhdood.

On 17 March 2026, he was presented as the new head coach of Romanian Liga I club Oțelul Galați. On 22 September 2026, SC Oțelul Galați and manager Stjepan Tomas mutually agreed to terminate their contractual relationship.

== Career statistics ==
=== International ===
Appearances and goals by national team and year
National team	Year	Apps	Goals
Croatia
Croatia	1998	1	0
Croatia	1999	4	1
Croatia	2000	4	0
Croatia	2001	5	0
Croatia	2002	10	0
Croatia	2003	8	0
Croatia	2004	5	0
Croatia	2005	8	0
Croatia	2006	4	0
Total		49	1

Scores and results list Romania's goal tally first, score column indicates score after each Munteanu goal.

List of international goals scored by Dorinel Munteanu
No.	Date	Venue	Opponent	Score	Result	Competition
1	19 June 1999	Seoul Olympic Stadium, Seoul, South Korea	South Korea	1–1	1–1	Friendly

== Managerial statistics ==
As of 21 September 2026

Team	From	To	Record							
Team	From	To	G	W	D	L	GF	GA	GD	Win %
(Turkey) Antalyaspor	20 November 2019	31 December 2019	8	1	4	3	9	15	−6	12.50
(Turkey) Çaykur Rizespor	1 August 2020	19 January 2021	21	7	6	8	32	35	−3	33.33
(Turkey) Göztepe	9 March 2022	27 April 2022	6	0	1	5	4	14	−10	0.00
(Moldova) Sheriff Tiraspol	1 July 2022	25 October 2022	25	13	6	6	36	18	+18	52.00
(Croatia) Osijek	24 April 2023	3 October 2023	20	10	5	5	41	32	+9	50.00
(Saudi Arabia) Al-Okhdood	21 July 2024	14 February 2025	21	4	4	13	22	34	−12	19.05
(Romania) Oțelul Galați	17 March 2026	22 September 2026	19	6	6	7	27	32	−5	31.58
Total			120	41	32	47	171	180	−9	34.17

== Honours ==
=== Player ===
Dinamo Zagreb

- Prva HNL: 1995–96, 1996–97, 1997–98, 1998–99, 1999–2000
- Croatian Cup: 1995–96, 1996–97, 1997–98

Fenerbahçe

- Süper Lig: 2003–04

Galatasaray

- Süper Lig: 2005–06
- Turkish Cup: 2004–05
- Turkish Super Cup runner-up: 2006

Rubin Kazan

- Russian Premier League: 2008, 2009
- Russian Cup runner-up: 2008–09
- Russian Super Cup runner-up: 2009
