= Erkan Sulejmani =

Kosovan footballer

Personal information
- Full name: Erkan Sulejmani
- Date of birth: 13 July 1981 (age 45)
- Place of birth: Pristina, Yugoslavia
- Height: 1.80 m (5 ft 11 in)
- Position: Midfielder

Youth career
- 1993–1998: Prishtina

Senior career*
Years	Team	Apps	(Gls)
1998–1999	Prishtina	24	(8)
1999–2001	İstanbulspor		
2001–2002	Bursaspor		
2002–2003	Gençlerbirliği		
2003–2004	Trabzonspor	13	(3)
2004–2005	Željezničar Sarajevo	38	(12)
2005–2007	Vllaznia	15	(5)
2007–2008	Kastrioti	3	(0)

International career^{‡}
1998	FR Yugoslavia U-19		
- * Club domestic league appearances and goals as of 1 September 2008 ‡ National team caps and goals as of 1 September 2008

Erkan Sulejmani (born 13 July 1981 in Pristina) is a retired Kosovan footballer.

== Club career ==
His first club was FK Pristina. Erkan also played for several Turkish teams where, during five years, played a total of 92 First League matches and scored 24 goals. Next, in January 2005 signed a six months contract with FK Željezničar Sarajevo in Bosnia and Herzegovina before moved to KS Vllaznia Shkodër in June 2005. He is a midfielder and plays in the centre. On 2006, Erkan was voted as the best player of the Albanian Superliga. He last played as a midfielder for Kastrioti Krujë in Albania.

== Honours ==
- Albanian Superliga Best player: 2006
