= Fatih Tekke =

Turkish footballer and coach (born 1977)

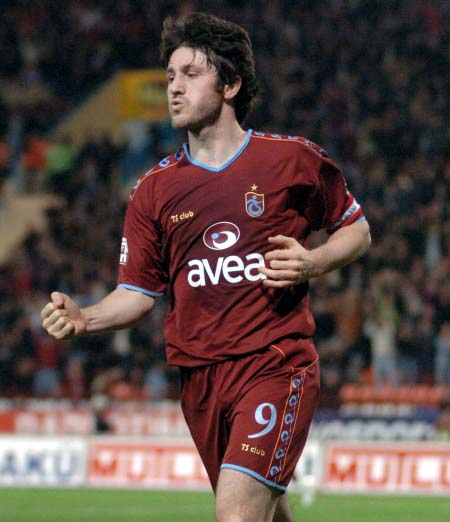
- Tekke playing for Trabzonspor in 2005

Personal information
- Full name: Fatih Tekke
- Date of birth: 9 September 1977 (age 49)
- Place of birth: Köprübaşı, Trabzon, Turkey
- Height: 1.78 m (5 ft 10 in)
- Position: Striker

Senior career*
| Years | Team | Apps | (Gls) |
| 1994–2000 | Trabzonspor | 83 | (12) |
| 1997–1998 | → Altay (loan) | 24 | (8) |
| 2000–2002 | Gaziantepspor | 57 | (28) |
| 2002–2006 | Trabzonspor | 114 | (77) |
| 2006–2010 | Zenit Saint Petersburg | 73 | (24) |
| 2010 | Rubin Kazan | 5 | (0) |
| 2010–2011 | Beşiktaş | 2 | (0) |
| 2011 | Ankaragücü | 9 | (3) |
| 2011–2012 | Orduspor | 15 | (3) |
| Total | | 382 | (155) |

International career
| 1998–2007 | Turkey | 25 | (9) |

Managerial career
- 2015: Kayseri Erciyesspor
- 2016: Boluspor
- 2017–2018: Manisaspor
- 2018: Denizlispor
- 2018–2019: İstanbulspor
- 2020–2021: İstanbulspor
- 2021: Bursaspor
- 2021–2022: Denizlispor
- 2022–2023: İstanbulspor
- 2023–2024: Alanyaspor
- 2025–2026: Trabzonspor
- * Club domestic league appearances and goals

Fatih Tekke (born 9 September 1977), known by his given nickname Sultan, is a Turkish professional football manager and former player. He last served as the head coach of the Süper Lig club Trabzonspor. He started his professional career at Trabzonspor and later played for Altay, Gaziantepspor, Zenit, and Beşiktaş. He achieved recognition as the top scorer in the Süper Lig during the 2004–05 season. Tekke also represented the Turkey national team, and he eventually retired from playing, transitioning into a managerial role.

== Club career ==
=== Early years ===
Tekke was born in the small town of Köprübaşı, in the province of Trabzon. He joined Trabzonspor, the major team in the area. Tekke was still in his teens when he started to appear in the first team. In 45 matches that he played between 1994–97, he scored six goals. At the beginning of the 1997–98 season he was loaned out to Altay of İzmir, where he scored eight goals in 24 matches. In a 5–4 defeat to Galatasaray, he scored a hat-trick. However a few weeks later he broke his leg and was out of the game for six months. Upon his return to Trabzonspor, Tekke played another 38 matches and scored six goals before he transferred to Gaziantepspor in the summer of 2000. In this period he made his first appearance for the Turkey national team.

In 2002, Tekke returned to Trabzonspor and was given the captaincy. This was the time Tekke reached the peak of his career. In the 2004–05 season he managed to become the league's top goal scorer with 31 goals, 7 goals ahead of the second placed player and was second for the Golden Foot. During his spell with Trabzonspor, he won two medals for winning the Turkish Cup in consecutive seasons.

=== Russia ===
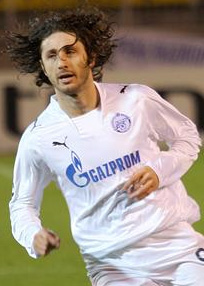
Fatih Tekke against Real Madrid

In July 2006, at the beginning of the 2006–07 season, he transferred from Trabzonspor to Russian Premier League club Zenit Saint Petersburg, for a fee of €7.5 million. He won the Russian Premier League in the 2007 season with Zenit Saint Petersburg and lifted the UEFA Cup by defeating Rangers in the 2008 UEFA Cup final. He was voted man of the match by the readers of the UEFA website (uefa.com) for his football in the final. He also won the 2008 UEFA Super Cup with Zenit Saint Petersburg by defeating the 2007–08 UEFA Champions League winners, Manchester United.

As of 10 November 2009, according to the statistics on the club's official website, he has made a total of 84 appearances in the Russian Premier League, Russian Cup, UEFA Cup and UEFA Champions League, scoring 30 goals. Although it was reported in the media that he was not considered by the team because he was sometimes substituted, he made a very successful start to the new season in Russia.

On 3 February 2010, Tekke signed a three-year contract with Rubin Kazan. He only played five games before he decided to return to Turkey, transferring to Beşiktaş.

=== Back to Turkey ===
On 1 September 2010, Tekke signed a two-year contract with Beşiktaş However, he was only able to play a total of two games before he was sent to Ankaragücü, in the 2010–11 transfer window. In the five matches he played for Ankaragücü, he scored three goals. In the summer transfer season of 2011, the newly promoted team, Orduspor, declared that they had purchased Tekke from Ankaragücü. Tekke was given the number 23 and the captaincy of the team. He then moved to Orduspor and retired soon after. He then became a manager.

== International career ==
Tekke was in the Turkey national squad for U-15, U-16, U-17, U-18, U-21, and for the Turkey national team. For U-15, he played six matches and scored no goals. For U-16, he played 18 matches and scored five goals, while also winning the UEFA European Under-16 Championship, held in Ireland. For U-17, he played ten matches and scored no goals. For U18, he played 13 matches and scored five goals. For U-21, he only played one match. Between 1998 and 2007, Tekke played 25 matches and scored nine goals for the Turkey national team.

== Managerial career ==
=== Early career ===
On 29 March 2015, he signed a contract with Kayseri Erciyesspor. In February 2018, Tekke was appointed as the head coach of Denizlispor, which ranked 16th with 17 points from 21 matches. Under Tekke's management, they collected 21 points in 13 matches, reaching 38 points and contributed to Denizlispor finishing the season in 15th place by taking them out of the relegation zone.

In the 2019–20 season, Tekke coached İstanbulspor, one of the TFF First League teams, finishing 4th in the league and earning the right to compete in the Play-offs. In the play-offs, İstanbulspor lost to Altay with the scores of 3–2 and 1–0 and lost the chance to be promoted to Süper Lig.

Tekke signed a 1+1 year contract with Bursaspor, one of the TFF First League teams, in the 2nd week of the 2021–22 season. On 19 September 2021, after 2 defeats, 1 win and 1 draw in 4 matches as Bursaspor coach, his duty was terminated.

On 24 October 2022, following the resignation of Osman Zeki Korkmaz, Tekke became the new head coach of Süper Lig team İstanbulspor. Tekke, who was appointed as the head coach of İstanbulspor for the 3rd time in his career, signed a 5-year contract with his new club. On 25 September 2023, Tekke and the club parted ways by mutual agreement. On 3 November 2023, Fatih Tekke was appointed as the head coach of Alanyaspor, a club competing in Turkey’s Süper Lig. He signed a 1.5-year contract with the club. During the 2023–24 season, under Tekke’s leadership, Alanyaspor finished 7th in the Süper Lig and reached the fifth round of the Turkish Cup.

On 3 November 2024, following a 0–0 draw against Bodrum, Tekke announced his resignation as head coach of Alanyaspor. Tekke cited ongoing challenges and a lack of expected progress as reasons for his departure, stating, “Problems aren’t resolving; there’s a blockage.

=== Trabzonspor ===
On 12 March 2025, Tekke was officially appointed as the head coach of Trabzonspor. The announcement followed the dismissal of Şenol Güneş the previous day, with Güneş assuming the role of sporting director. The details of Tekke’s contract remained undisclosed. On 27 August 2026, Tekke announced his resignation after a 4–0 away defeat against Ferencváros in the Europa League play-off round, but his resignation was not accepted by the board of the club. A few days later, on 1 September, he left his position following a 2–1 away defeat against newly promoted Amedspor.

== Career statistics ==
=== Club ===
Appearances and goals by club, season and competition
| Club | Season | League | | Cup | | Europe | | Total | |
| Club | Season | Apps | Goals | Apps | Goals | Apps | Goals | Apps | Goals |
|---|---|---|---|---|---|---|---|---|---|
| Trabzonspor | 1994–95 | 4 | 0 | 2 | 0 | 0 | 0 | 6 | 0 |
| Trabzonspor | 1995–96 | 20 | 3 | 2 | 1 | 4 | 0 | 26 | 4 |
| Trabzonspor | 1996–97 | 19 | 3 | 3 | 1 | 3 | 0 | 25 | 4 |
| Trabzonspor | 1997–98 | 2 | 0 | 0 | 0 | 0 | 0 | 2 | 0 |
| Trabzonspor | 1998–99 | 16 | 4 | 0 | 0 | 0 | 0 | 16 | 4 |
| Trabzonspor | 1999–00 | 22 | 2 | 3 | 0 | 0 | 0 | 25 | 2 |
| Trabzonspor | Total | 83 | 12 | 10 | 2 | 7 | 0 | 59 | 8 |
| Altay (loan) | 1997–98 | 24 | 8 | 2 | 1 | 0 | 0 | 26 | 9 |
| Gaziantepspor | 2000–01 | 31 | 15 | 2 | 0 | 2 | 0 | 35 | 15 |
| Gaziantepspor | 2001–02 | 24 | 12 | 3 | 2 | 3 | 1 | 30 | 15 |
| Gaziantepspor | 2002–03 | 2 | 1 | 0 | 0 | 0 | 0 | 2 | 1 |
| Gaziantepspor | Total | 57 | 28 | 5 | 2 | 5 | 1 | 67 | 31 |
| Trabzonspor | 2002–03 | 28 | 13 | 5 | 4 | 0 | 0 | 33 | 17 |
| Trabzonspor | 2003–04 | 24 | 11 | 4 | 1 | 2 | 1 | 30 | 13 |
| Trabzonspor | 2004–05 | 34 | 31 | 4 | 2 | 6 | 1 | 44 | 34 |
| Trabzonspor | 2005–06 | 28 | 22 | 3 | 3 | 2 | 2 | 33 | 27 |
| Trabzonspor | Total | 114 | 77 | 16 | 10 | 10 | 4 | 140 | 91 |
| Zenit Saint Petersburg | 2006 | 15 | 4 | 0 | 0 | 0 | 0 | 15 | 4 |
| Zenit Saint Petersburg | 2007 | 16 | 4 | 5 | 1 | 2 | 1 | 23 | 6 |
| Zenit Saint Petersburg | 2008 | 22 | 8 | 1 | 0 | 5 | 1 | 28 | 9 |
| Zenit Saint Petersburg | 2009 | 20 | 8 | 0 | 0 | 5 | 2 | 23 | 10 |
| Zenit Saint Petersburg | Total | 73 | 24 | 6 | 1 | 12 | 4 | 91 | 29 |
| Rubin Kazan | 2010 | 5 | 0 | 2 | 0 | 0 | 0 | 7 | 0 |
| Beşiktaş | 2010–11 | 2 | 0 | 1 | 0 | 0 | 0 | 3 | 0 |
| Ankaragücü | 2010–11 | 9 | 3 | 1 | 0 | 0 | 0 | 10 | 3 |
| Orduspor | 2011–12 | 15 | 3 | 0 | 0 | 0 | 0 | 15 | 3 |
| Career total | | 382 | 155 | 41 | 16 | 34 | 9 | 457 | 180 |

=== International ===
Appearances and goals by national team and year
| National team | Year | Apps | Goals |
|---|---|---|---|
Turkey
| Turkey | 1998 | 2 | 0 |
| Turkey | 1999 | 0 | 0 |
| Turkey | 2000 | 1 | 0 |
| Turkey | 2001 | 1 | 0 |
| Turkey | 2002 | 0 | 0 |
| Turkey | 2003 | 2 | 0 |
| Turkey | 2004 | 5 | 3 |
| Turkey | 2005 | 8 | 5 |
| Turkey | 2006 | 5 | 1 |
| Turkey | 2007 | 1 | 0 |
| Total | | 25 | 9 |

Scores and results list Turkey's goal tally first, score column indicates score after each Tekke goal.

List of international goals scored by Fatih Tekke
| No. | Date | Venue | Opponent | Score | Result | Competition |
|---|---|---|---|---|---|---|
| 1 | 4 September 2004 | Hüseyin Avni Aker Stadium, Trabzon, Turkey | Georgia | 1–0 | 1–1 | 2006 FIFA World Cup qualification |
| 2 | 9 October 2004 | Şükrü Saracoğlu Stadium, Istanbul, Turkey | Kazakhstan | 3–0 | 4–0 | 2006 FIFA World Cup qualification |
| 3 | 9 October 2004 | Şükrü Saracoğlu Stadium, Istanbul, Turkey | Kazakhstan | 4–0 | 4–0 | 2006 FIFA World Cup qualification |
| 4 | 30 March 2005 | Mikheil Meskhi Stadium, Tbilisi, Georgia | Georgia | 2–1 | 5–2 | 2006 FIFA World Cup qualification |
| 5 | 30 March 2005 | Mikheil Meskhi Stadium, Tbilisi, Georgia | Georgia | 3–1 | 5–2 | 2006 FIFA World Cup qualification |
| 6 | 8 June 2005 | Almaty Central Stadium, Almaty, Kazakhstan | Kazakhstan | 1–0 | 6–0 | 2006 FIFA World Cup qualification |
| 7 | 8 June 2005 | Almaty Central Stadium, Almaty, Kazakhstan | Kazakhstan | 4–0 | 6–0 | 2006 FIFA World Cup qualification |
| 8 | 17 August 2005 | Vasil Levski National Stadium, Sofia, Bulgaria | Bulgaria | 1–0 | 1–3 | Friendly |
| 9 | 16 August 2006 | Stade Josy Barthel, Luxembourg City, Luxembourg | Luxembourg | 1–0 | 1–0 | Friendly |

== Managerial statistics ==
As of 30 August 2026

Managerial record by team and tenure
| Team | From | To | Record | | | | |
| Team | From | To | G | W | D | L | Win % |
|---|---|---|---|---|---|---|---|
| Erciyesspor | 2 April 2015 | 31 May 2015 | 9 | 1 | 4 | 4 | 11.11 |
| Boluspor | 5 February 2016 | 20 May 2016 | 13 | 2 | 6 | 5 | 15.38 |
| Manisaspor | 11 October 2017 | 17 January 2018 | 13 | 5 | 3 | 5 | 38.46 |
| Denizlispor | 14 February 2018 | 31 May 2018 | 13 | 6 | 3 | 4 | 46.15 |
| İstanbulspor | 4 June 2018 | 12 March 2019 | 27 | 6 | 11 | 10 | 22.22 |
| İstanbulspor | 1 January 2020 | 23 March 2021 | 46 | 20 | 11 | 15 | 43.48 |
| Bursaspor | 24 August 2021 | 19 September 2021 | 4 | 1 | 1 | 2 | 25.00 |
| Denizlispor | 17 November 2021 | 24 January 2022 | 12 | 3 | 3 | 6 | 25.00 |
| İstanbulspor | 25 October 2022 | 25 September 2023 | 30 | 9 | 5 | 16 | 30.00 |
| Alanyaspor | 3 November 2023 | 3 November 2024 | 40 | 13 | 15 | 12 | 32.50 |
| Trabzonspor | 12 March 2025 | 1 September 2026 | 62 | 35 | 14 | 13 | 56.45 |
| Total | | | 269 | 101 | 76 | 92 | 37.55 |

== Honours ==
=== Player ===
Turkey

- UEFA European Under-16 Championship: 1994

Trabzonspor

- Turkish Cup: 2002–03, 2003–04

Zenit Saint Petersburg

- Russian Premier League: 2007
- UEFA Cup: 2007–08
- UEFA Super Cup: 2008

Rubin Kazan

- Russian Super Cup: 2010

=== Manager ===
Trabzonspor

- Turkish Cup: 2025–26
