= Seif Daoud =

Egyptian footballer (born 1977)

Personal information
- Date of birth: August 28, 1977 (age 49)
- Place of birth: Port Said, Egypt
- Position: Striker

Youth career
- El-Marekh

Senior career*
Years	Team	Apps	(Gls)
1995–2003	Al-Masry	?	(?)
2003–2004	MKE Ankaragücü	?	(?)
Total		?	(?)

International career
	Egypt	1	
- * Club domestic league appearances and goals

Seif Daoud (Arabic: سيف داود; born 28 August 1977) is a former Egyptian footballer.

== Career ==
Daoud played for Al-Masry Club in the Egyptian Premier League between 1995 and 2003. He was recently appointed as the assistant coach of the team.

== Clubs ==
- Al-Masry Club (1995-03)
- MKE Ankaragücü (2003–04)

== National teams ==
He played once for the Egyptian national team.

== Titles ==
Personal

- The all-time top goal scorer for Al-Masry in African Clubs Cups.
- He scored the fastest goal in Egypt Cup History vs. Arab Contractors SC, 1998, after 21 seconds of play.

For Al-Masry

- 1 title of Egypt Cup 1998
