= Poeševo =

- Village
- Поешево
- Location within North Macedonia
- Coordinates: 41°02′N 21°16′E
- Country: North Macedonia
- Region: Pelagonia
- Municipality: Bitola

Population (2002)
  - Total: 272
- Time zone: UTC+1 (CET)
  - Summer (DST): UTC+2 (CEST)
- Car plates: BT
- Website: .

Poeševo (Macedonian: Поешево) is a village in the municipality of Bitola, North Macedonia. The village is 5.1 kilometres (3.2 mi) away from Bitola, which is the second-largest city in the country.

== Demographics ==
Poeševo is attested in the Ottoman defter of 1467/68 as a village in the vilayet of Manastir. The e inhabitants attested bore a mixed Slavic-Albanian anthroponymy, such as Dedie Radosllav.

According to the 2002 census, the village had a total of 272 inhabitants. Ethnic groups in the village include:

- Macedonians 266
- Albanians 6

== Sports ==
Local football club FK Poeševo plays in the OFS Bitola First Division.
