= Jean (footballer, born 1981) =

Brazilian footballer

Personal information
- Full name: Jean Paulo Batista de França
- Date of birth: 21 November 1981 (age 44)
- Place of birth: Recife, Brazil
- Height: 1.77 m (5 ft 10 in)
- Position: Left-back

Youth career
- 2000–2001: Sport

Senior career*
Years	Team	Apps	(Gls)
2002–2003	Sport		
2003	Treze		
2004	Uberaba-MG		
2004–2005	Penafiel		
2005	Vasco		
2005	Gama	9	(0)
2005–2006	MKE Ankaragücü	11	(1)
2006–2007	Tupi		
2007	Atlético Mineiro		
2007	Democrata		
2008	América-MG		
2009	Americana	6	(0)
2009	Fortaleza	3	(0)
2010	Nacional		
2010	Goianésia		
2010–2011	América-MG	16	(0)
2011	Paysandu	3	(0)
2012	Central	9	(0)
2012	Tupi	6	(0)
2013–2015	Central	53	(3)
2016	Itumbiara	1	(0)
- * Club domestic league appearances and goals

Jean Paulo Batista de França or simply Jean (born 21 November 1981) is a Brazilian former professional footballer who played as a left-back.
