= Axel Smeets =

Belgian football manager and former player

Personal information
- Full name: Axel Smeets
- Date of birth: 12 July 1974 (age 52)
- Place of birth: Brussels, Belgium
- Height: 1.81 m (5 ft 11 1/2 in)
- Positions: Defender; midfielder

Youth career
- Bosvoorde
- Anderlecht

Senior career*
Years	Team	Apps	(Gls)
1993–1994	Standard Liège	12	(0)
1994–1997	Gent	80	(2)
1997–1998	Salamanca	1	(0)
1998–1999	Charleroi	-	(-)
1999	Kortrijk	23	(1)
1999–2000	Sheffield United	8	(0)
2000–2003	Lierse	74	(0)
2003–2004	Ankarugücü	7	(0)
2004–2006	HamKam	42	(1)
	Total	247	(4 )

International career
	Belgium U-21	25	(0)

Managerial career
- 2012–2013: Anderlecht (scout)
- 2013–2014: RC Waterloo
- * Club domestic league appearances and goals

Axel Smeets (born 12 July 1974 in Brussels, Belgium) is a former Association football and football manager, who played as a defender and could also play as a midfielder.

== Career ==
During his career he played for several Belgian clubs and also played overseas for UD Salamanca, Sheffield United (where he got sent off on his debut against Portsmouth) and MKE Ankaragücü, where he had several experiences (good and bad) and ended his career in Norway with HamKam due to a hip injury. The bad recovery from this injury prevented him from signing a 3 years contract for Club Brugge. He also won 25 caps without scoring for the Belgium Under-21s.

The Norwegian Athletes Association had Smeets as right back on their football Team of the Year 2004.

After passing his UEFA A Licence, he decided to take the FIFA Players' Agent Exam, which he also successfully passed. He's now devoting himself to his player's careers. He also coaches the St. John's International School Boys Varsity football team.
