= Ivaylo Petkov =

Bulgarian footballer

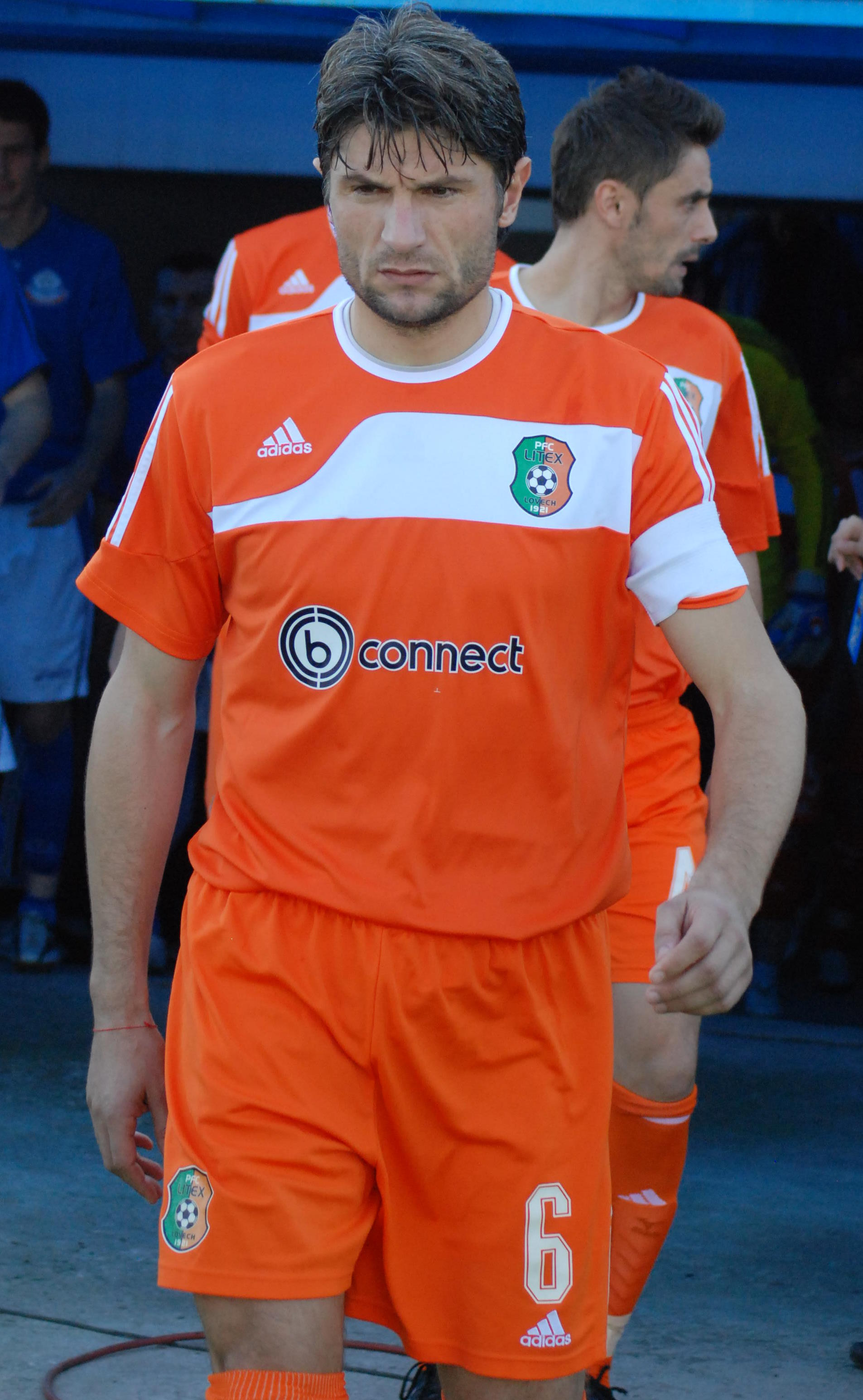
- Petkov with Litex Lovech in 2010

Personal information
- Full name: Ivaylo Rumenov Petkov
- Date of birth: 24 March 1976 (age 50)
- Place of birth: Dolni Dabnik, Bulgaria
- Height: 1.86 m (6 ft 1 in)
- Positions: Left-back; centre-back

Senior career*
Years	Team	Apps	(Gls)
1995–1997	Spartak Pleven	29	(2)
1997–1998	Litex Lovech	27	(3)
1998–2003	Istanbulspor	160	(7)
2003–2004	Fenerbahçe	16	(0)
2004–2005	Kuban Krasnodar	43	(2)
2005–2007	Ankaragücü	44	(2)
2007–2008	Kuban Krasnodar	47	(10)
2009–2011	Litex Lovech	27	(2)
Total		393	(28)

International career
1996–2009	Bulgaria	63	(3)
- * Club domestic league appearances and goals

Ivaylo Rumenov Petkov (Bulgarian: Ивайло Руменов Петков; born 24 March 1976) is a Bulgarian former professional footballer, who played mainly as a left-back and centre-back. He has won three A PFG titles, one Süper Lig title, a Bulgarian Cup and Bulgarian Supercup at Club Level, playing for six different teams throughout his career.

== Club career ==
Born in Dolni Dabnik, Pleven Province, Petkov began his football career with Spartak Pleven and made his first-team debut in 1995. He did not make an appearance during the 1995–96 season, but subsequently established himself in the first team. In the 1996–97 season, he made 29 league appearances and scored two goals.

After moving to Litex Lovech in 1997, Petkov made 27 league appearances and scored three goals in the 1997–98 season, contributing to the club's league title. In 1998, he moved to Turkey to join Istanbulspor, where he played until 2003. During this period, he made 160 league appearances and scored seven goals.

In 2003, he joined Fenerbahçe. During the 2003–04 season, he won the Süper Lig title. In 2004, he moved to Russia to join Kuban Krasnodar, and in 2005 he transferred to Turkey's Ankaragücü. After returning to Kuban Krasnodar in 2007, he played in the Russian First Division in 2008 and contributed to the team's promotion. Across his two spells with Kuban, he made 90 league appearances and scored 12 goals.

In January 2009, he returned to Bulgaria and signed with Litex Lovech. In his first year back at the club, he won the Bulgarian Cup, and in the 2009–10 and 2010–11 seasons, he won consecutive league titles. Litex also won the Bulgarian Super Cup in 2010. Petkov ended his professional playing career after the 2010–11 season.

== International career ==
Petkov made his debut for the Bulgaria national team on 6 November 1996, selected by manager Hristo Bonev for a friendly match against Saudi Arabia. On 18 August 1999, he scored his first international goal in a friendly against Ukraine, scoring with a long-range shot from approximately 32 yards. The match ended in a 1–1 draw.

Petkov represented Bulgaria at the 1998 FIFA World Cup and UEFA Euro 2004. At the 1998 FIFA World Cup, he started and played the full 90 minutes in the group-stage matches against Paraguay and Nigeria. Bulgaria drew 0–0 with Paraguay but lost 0–1 to Nigeria, and were eliminated after losing 1–6 to Spain in their final group-stage match.

At UEFA Euro 2004, held in Portugal, he appeared in Bulgaria's first two group-stage matches. He played the full match against Sweden and played 39 minutes against Denmark. Petkov did not play in the final group-stage match against Italy. Bulgaria lost 5–0 to Sweden, 2–0 to Denmark, and 2–1 to Italy and were eliminated in the group stage.

== Career statistics ==
=== Club ===
(Correct as of 11 June 2011)

Appearances and goals by club, season and competition
Club	Season	League		Cup		Continental		Total	
Club	Season	Apps	Goals	Apps	Goals	Apps	Goals	Apps	Goals
İstanbulspor	1998–99	31	2	4	1	–		35	3
İstanbulspor	1999–2000	31	0	2	0	–		33	0
İstanbulspor	2000–01	29	2	3	0	–		32	2
İstanbulspor	2001–02	32	2	3	0	–		35	2
İstanbulspor	2002–03	33	1	1	0	–		34	1
İstanbulspor	2003–04	4	0	0	0	–		4	0
İstanbulspor	Total	160	7	13	1	0	0	173	8
Fenerbahçe	2003–04	16	0	2	1	0	0	18	1
Litex Lovech	2008–09	7	0	3	0	–		10	0
Litex Lovech	2009–10	15	1	0	0	2	0	17	1
Litex Lovech	2010–11	5	1	1	0	4	0	10	1
Total		27	2	4	0	6	0	37	2

=== International ===
Scores and goals list Bulgaria's goal tally first.

#	Date	Venue	Opponent	Score	Result	Competition
1.	18 August 1999	Valeriy Lobanovskyi Stadium, Kyiv, Ukraine	Ukraine	1–1	1–1	Friendly
2.	10 October 1999	Lazur Stadium, Burgas, Bulgaria	Luxembourg	2–0	3–0	UEFA Euro 2000 qualification
3.	29 March 2000	Georgi Asparuhov Stadium, Sofia, Bulgaria	Belarus	3–1	4–1	Friendly

== Honours ==
Litex Lovech

- Bulgarian League: 1997–98, 2009–10, 2010–11
- Bulgarian Cup: 2008–09
- Bulgarian Supercup: 2010

Fenerbahçe

- Süper Lig: 2003–04
