= Claude Bakadal =

French footballer (born 1976)

Personal information
- Full name: Claude Armel Bakadal
- Date of birth: 19 March 1976 (age 50)
- Place of birth: France
- Position: Forward

Senior career*
Years	Team	Apps	(Gls)
–1983	FC Massy 91		
1983–1998	Linas-Montlhéry		
1998–1999	Évry		
1999–2000	Grenoble		
2000–2003	Mouscron		
2003–2004	Diyarbakırspor	26	(6)
2004–2005	Akçaabat Sebatspor	14	(0)
2006–2007	Sainte-Geneviève		
2010	FC Issy	4	(1)

Managerial career
- 2013–2014: Viry-Châtillon (assistant)
- * Club domestic league appearances and goals

Claude Bakadal (born 19 March 1976) is a French former professional footballer who played as a forward.

== Playing career ==
Bakadal started his senior career with FC Massy 91. He went on to play for Linas-Montlhéry, Évry, Grenoble, and Mouscron. In 2003, he signed for Diyarbakırspor in the Turkish Süper Lig, where he made twenty-seven appearances and scored six goals. After that, he played for Turkish club Akçaabat Sebatspor and French clubs Sainte-Geneviève and FC Issy before retiring.

== Coaching career ==
From 2013 to 2014, Bakadal was an assistant coach at Viry-Châtillon.

== Personal life ==
Born in France, Bakadal is of Cameroonian descent.
