= Marcel Kimemba Mbayo =

Congolese footballer

Marcel Mbayo
Personal information
- Full name: Marcel Kimemba Mbayo
- Date of birth: 23 April 1978 (age 48)
- Place of birth: Lubumbashi, Zaire
- Height: 1.68 m (5 ft 6 in)
- Position: Attacking midfielder

Senior career*
Years	Team	Apps	(Gls)
1996–1998	Sodigraf	0	(0)
1999–2000	Lokeren	40	(2)
2000–2004	Gençlerbirliği	90	(7)
2004	Malatyaspor	16	(1)
2005–2006	Sakaryaspor	61	(7)
2007–2011	Lokeren	117	(10)
2011-2012	Tubize	14	(0)

International career^{‡}
1997–2011	DR Congo	46	(4)
Medal record
Representing DR Congo
Men's football
Africa Cup of Nations
Third place	1998 Burkina Faso
- * Club domestic league appearances and goals as of 1 February 2012 ‡ National team caps and goals as of 31 December 2011

Marcel Kimemba Mbayo (born 23 April 1978 in Lubumbashi) is a Congolese footballer who last played as a midfielder for A.F.C. Tubize.

He was part of the Congolese 2004 African Nations Cup team, who finished bottom of their group in the first round of competition, thus failing to secure qualification for the quarter-finals.

== Career statistics ==
=== International goals ===
Scores and results list DR Congo's goal tally first.

No.	Date	Venue	Opponent	Score	Result	Competition
1.	26 January 1997	National Stadium, Dar es Salaam, Tanzania	Tanzania	1–0	2–1	1998 African Cup of Nations qualification
2.	20 June 2004	Stade des Martyrs, Kinshasa, DR Congo	Burkina Faso	1–0	3–2	2006 FIFA World Cup qualification
3.	14 October 2009	Parc des Princes, Paris, France	Qatar	1–0	2–2	Friendly
4.	14 October 2009	Parc des Princes, Paris, France	Qatar	2–1	2–2	Friendly

== Honours ==
Gençlerbirliği

- Turkish Cup: 2001

DR Congo

- African Cup of Nations: 3rd place, 1998
