= Ramadan Ragap =

Egyptian footballer (born 1979)

Personal information
- Full name: Ramadan Ragap Mohamed Mohamed
- Date of birth: 13 June 1979 (age 47)
- Place of birth: Egypt
- Height: 1.84 m (6 ft 0 in)
- Position: Striker

Team information
- Current team: Haras El Hodood

Senior career*
| Years | Team | Apps | (Gls) |
- Zamalek
| 2002–2003 | Haras El Hodood | | |
| 2003–2005 | Ankaragücü | 21 | (0) |
| 2004–2005 | → İstanbulspor A.Ş. (loan) | 8 | (0) |
| 2007– | Haras El Hodood | | |

International career
- Egypt U23
- * Club domestic league appearances and goals

Ramadan Ragap Mohamed Mohamed (Arabic: رمضان رجب) (born 13 June 1979) is an Egyptian football player.

== Football career ==
Ramadan Ragap was transferred to Ankaragücü in summer 2003, signed a three-year contract. He was on loan to İstanbulspor A.Ş. in 2004/05 season.
