= Goran Stavrevski =

Macedonian football defender (born 1974)

Personal information
- Full name: Goran Stavrevski; Горан Ставревски
- Date of birth: 2 January 1974 (age 52)
- Place of birth: Poeševo, SFR Yugoslavia
- Height: 1.83 m (6 ft 0 in)
- Position: Defender

Youth career
- Poeševo

Senior career*
Years	Team	Apps	(Gls)
1992–1998	Pelister		
1998–2003	NK Zagreb	143	(2)
2003–2007	Diyarbakırspor	122	(1)
2007–2008	Pelister	7	(0)
2008–2009	Novaci		
2010–2012	Poeševo		
2012–2015	Novaci		
2015-	Poeševo		
Total		272	(3)

International career
1998–2005	Macedonia	40	(3)
- * Club domestic league appearances and goals

Goran Stavrevski (Macedonian: Горан Ставревски; born 2 January 1974 in Poeševo, SFR Yugoslavia) is a Macedonian football defender who despite his age is still active by playing for FK Poeševo in the OFL Bitola, Macedonia's fourth tier, together with another well known veteran in Toni Micevski.

== International career ==
Stavrevski made his debut for the Republic of Macedonian national team in September 1998 Malta and has earned a total of 41 caps and 3 goals.

In 1999, Stavrevski scored a last minute equalizer for Macedonia against the Republic of Ireland in the final UEFA Euro 2000 qualification match which denied the Irish a place in the finals, giving the berth instead to former compatriots FR Yugoslavia. His final international was a February 2005 FIFA World Cup qualification match against Andorra.

== Honours ==
NK Zagreb

- Prva HNL: 2001–02
