= Honore Kabongo =

Rwandan footballer

Honoré Kabongo
Personal information
- Full name: Joseph Honoré Kabongo
- Date of birth: January 1, 1985 (age 41)
- Place of birth: Kisangani, DR Congo
- Height: 1.77 m (5 ft 10 in)
- Position: Striker

Youth career
- 2002–2004: Renaissance Kigali

Senior career*
Years	Team	Apps	(Gls)
2004	Renaissance Kigali	?	(?)
2004	Patro Maasmechelen	12	(1)
2005–2006	Sakaryaspor	5	(0)
2006–2007	Hakoah Amidar Ramat Gan	14	(0)
2007–2008	APR FC	39	(3)
2008–2009	Samutsongkhram	23	(3)
2009–2010	Young Africans		

International career
2004	Republic of Congo U-17	1	(0)
2005–2007	Rwanda	20	(0)
- * Club domestic league appearances and goals

Joseph Honoré Kabongo (born 1 January 1985 in Brazzaville) is a former football player from Rwanda.

== Career ==
He began his career by Renaissance Kigali, before joined to Patro Maasmechelen in July 2004. Kabongo left after 6 months Belgium and moved to Sakaryaspor in Turkey in January 2005, he played here 5 games before joined to Hakoah Ramat-Gan in July 2006. Than moved back to APR FC in January 2007, after 1 year in February 2008 left APR and moved to Somalia to sign a contract by Goldogob FC. The Thai club Samut Songkhram FC signed him in July 2008, but for this season of July 2009 he played for Tanzania Champions Young Africans FC.

== International ==
He played from 2005 to 2007 for the Rwanda national football team. Kabongo has also been handed his first cap on 27 March 2005 against Algeria national football team. He was also a member of the Under 17 team from Congo.
