= Atay Aktuğ =

President of football club Trabzonspor (1945–2026)

President of Trabzonspor
- In office August 2003 – 2005
- Preceded by: Özkan Sümer
- Succeeded by: Nuri Albayrak

Mayor of Trabzon
- In office 1989–1994

Personal details
- Born: 11 April 1945 Trabzon Province, Turkey
- Died: 18 April 2026 (aged 81)
- Party: Social Democratic Populist Party (1989–1992); Republican People's Party (1992–1994)
Association football career
Senior career*
Years	Team	Apps	(Gls)
1960s–1970s	Trabzonspor		
- * Club domestic league appearances and goals

Atay Aktuğ (11 April 1945 – 18 April 2026) was the president of the Turkish football club Trabzonspor.

== Career ==
Atay was a player for Trabzonspor in the late 1960s and early 1970s. He was voted in as president after his predecessor Özkan Sümer suddenly resigned in August 2003. He was re-elected in December 2004.

One of the main changes he has brought about is to list Trabzonspor on the Istanbul Stock Exchange, in the hope of raising funds for the club. Under his stewardship Trabzonspor has embarked on a series of tasks to raise marketing income through sponsorship and to create a large community of members throughout Turkey and Europe.

Aktuğ was the mayor of Trabzon the SHP and CHP's between 1989 and 1994.
