= Souleymanou Hamidou =

Cameroonian footballer (born 1973)

Personal information
- Full name: Wassougna Souleymanou Hamidou
- Date of birth: 22 November 1973 (age 52)
- Place of birth: Mokolo, Cameroon
- Height: 1.82 m (6 ft 0 in)
- Position: Goalkeeper

Senior career*
Years	Team	Apps	(Gls)
1996–2000	Cotonsport Garoua	14	(0)
2000–2003	Çaykur Rizespor	40	(0)
2003–2008	Denizlispor	128	(0)
2008–2011	Kayserispor	89	(0)
Total		271	(0)

International career
2000–2010	Cameroon	25	(0)
Medal record
Men's football
Representing Cameroon
Africa Cup of Nations
Winner	2000 Ghana-Nigeria
Runner-up	2008 Ghana
- * Club domestic league appearances and goals

Wassougna Souleymanou Hamidou (born 22 November 1973) is a Cameroonian former professional footballer who played as a goalkeeper.

== International career ==
Hamidou was a member of the Cameroon national team at the 2006 African Nations Cup, which exited in the quarter-finals. He was again called up to the Cameroon squad for the 2010 FIFA World Cup, where he was starting goalkeeper for the three group matches played. This was considered a surprise, because he was selected by Paul Le Guen for this match over the expected keeper, Idriss Carlos Kameni. Cameroon lost all three of the group matches and thus did not qualify to move on to the knockout stage of the competition.

He was part of the victorious 2000 African Cup of Nations squad.

== Honours ==
Cameroon

- African Cup of Nations: 2000; runner-up, 2008
