= Redi Jupi =

Albanian footballer

Personal information
- Full name: Redi Bashkim Jupi
- Date of birth: 31 May 1974 (age 52)
- Place of birth: Vlorë, PR Albania
- Height: 1.80 m (5 ft 11 in)
- Position: Midfielder

Senior career*
Years	Team	Apps	(Gls)
1994–1995	Dinamo Tirana	11	(1)
1995–1996	Olimpik Tirana		(6)
1995–1996	Partizani Tirana	21	(5)
1996–1997	Istra Pula	9	(0)
1997	Rijeka	3	(0)
1998	SET Vevče	22	(1)
1998–1999	Partizani Tirana	25	(6)
1999–2002	Dinamo Tirana	71	(5)
2002–2003	Tirana	22	(4)
2003–2006	Diyarbakırspor	88	(5)
2006–2008	Dinamo Tirana	11	(5)

International career^{‡}
1995–2006	Albania	19	(0)

Managerial career
- 2006–2007: Dinamo Tirana
- 2015–2016: Albania U21
- * Club domestic league appearances and goals as of 16 October 2015 ‡ National team caps and goals as of 16 October 2015

Redi Bashkim Jupi (born 31 May 1974) is an Albanian retired footballer. He played in the central midfield for KS Dinamo Tirana and has 19 caps for the Albania national team since his debut in 1995. Jupi is currently the manager of Albania U21 for the European Football Championship qualification.

== Playing career ==
=== Club ===
Jupi appeared in 128 Turkish Super Lig matches during the three seasons he played for Diyarbakirspor.

=== International ===
He made his debut for Albania in an August 1995 friendly match away against Malta and earned a total of 19 caps, scoring no goals. His final international was a March 2006 friendly match against Georgia in Tirana.

=== National team statistics ===
Albania national team
Year	Apps	Goals
1995	2	0
1996	0	0
1997	0	0
1998	0	0
1999	2	0
2000	1	0
2001	0	0
2002	7	0
2003	1	0
2004	0	0
2005	5	0
2006	1	0
Total	19	0

== Managerial career ==
On 11 August 2015, Jupi was appointed manager of the Albania U21 following the departure of Skënder Gega at Kuwaiti Premier League side Al-Jahra. His debut was a 1–1 home draw against Israel U21 in team's second qualifying match for 2017 UEFA European Under-21 Football Championship. After the match, he told the media that he was satisfied with the team's reaction.

== Albanian FA ==
The Albanian Football Association president Armand Duka created the 'Talent Office' in 2011 and named Jupi as the head of the new department to scout young Albanian talent all around the world and convince them to represent Albania. From 2012 onward he was appointed as the Director of the National Teams Department in the AFA.

== Honours ==
- Albanian Superliga: 2

2002, 2003
