= List of Turkish football transfers summer 2010 =

This is a list of Turkish football transfers in the summer transfer window 2010 by club. Only transfers of the Süper Lig and 1st League are included.

== Süper Lig ==
=== Ankaragücü ===
In: Note: Flags indicate national team as defined under FIFA eligibility rules; some limited exceptions apply. Players may hold more than one non-FIFA nationality.

No.	Pos.	Nation	Player
25	DF	TUR	Aydın Toscalı (free, from Kayserispor)
14	DF	POL	Michał Żewłakow (free, from (Greece) Olympiacos)
11	FW	SVK	Robert Vittek (€2,100,000, from (France) Lille)
3	DF	TUR	Uğur Uçar (€650,000, from Galatasaray)
7	FW	TUR	Turgut Şahin (€700,000, from Samsunspor)
19	MF	TUR	Güven Varol (free, from Manisaspor)
50	MF	TUR	Hürriyet Gücer (free, from Ankaraspor)
66	MF	TUR	Adem Koçak (free, from Ankaraspor)
8	FW	TUR	Mehmet Çakır (free, from Ankaraspor)
5	DF	CAN	Michael Klukowski (€750,000, from (Belgium) Club Brugge)
4	DF	TUR	Muhammet Hanifi Yoldaş (free, from Ankaraspor)
41	GK	TUR	Özden Öngün (€50,000, from Denizlispor)
60	DF	TUR	Özgür Çek (free, from Ankaraspor)
21	FW	GAB	Roguy Méyé (free, from Ankaraspor)
9	FW	SVK	Stanislav Sestak (€600,000, loan from (Germany) VfL Bochum)
92	FW	TUR	Teoman Safa Erkan (free, from Ankaraspor)
15	MF	LBR	Theo Weeks (free, from Ankaraspor)
20	MF	TUR	Umut Sözen (free, from Ankaraspor)
—	MF	CRO	Drago Gabrić (loan, from Trabzonspor)
-	-	TUR	Abdullah Harun Fidan (free, from Ankaraspor)
-	GK	TUR	Alican Candemir (free, from Ankaraspor)
-	-	TUR	Aytaç Öden (free, from Ankaraspor)
-	-	TUR	Baran Yardımcı (free, from Ankaraspor)
-	-	TUR	Bilal Gülden (free, from Ankaraspor)
-	-	TUR	Enes Kubat (free, from Ankaraspor)
-	-	TUR	Faruk Cankat Güven (free transfer)
-	-	TUR	Fırat Sandıkçı (free, from Ankaraspor)
-	-	TUR	Gökhan Akkan (free, from Ankaraspor)
-	-	TUR	Necmettin Kutlubay (free, from Ankaraspor)
-	-	TUR	Orhan Evci (free, from Ankaraspor)
1	GK	TUR	Štefan Senecký (free, from Ankaraspor)
-	-	TUR	Vedat Kurhan (free, from Ankaraspor)
-	-	TUR	Yasin Türkvatan (free, from Ankaraspor)
29	MF	TUR	Abdullah Keseroğlu (free, from (Germany) VfL Osnabrück)

Out: Note: Flags indicate national team as defined under FIFA eligibility rules; some limited exceptions apply. Players may hold more than one non-FIFA nationality.

No.	Pos.	Nation	Player
-	MF	TUR	Semavi Özgür (free, to Manisaspor)
-	FW	ENG	Darius Vassell (free transfer)
-	DF	TUR	İlkem Özkaynak (free, to Antalyaspor)
-	DF	TUR	Elyasa Süme (free, to Gaziantepspor)
-	FW	TUR	Emre Aygün (undisclosed, to Eskişehirspor)
-	MF	TUR	Cihan Haspolatlı (free, to İstanbul B.B.)
-	MF	CMR	Geremi Njitap (free, to (Greece) Larissa)
-	MF	TUR	Suat Baş (free transfer)
-	MF	TUR	Barbaros Barut (free transfer)
-	MF	TUR	Kaan Kanak (free transfer)
-	DF	TUR	Uğur Demirkol (free transfer)
-	DF	TUR	Koray Çölgeçen (undisclosed, to Bucaspor)
-	FW	TUR	Murat Yılmaz (free transfer)
-	MF	TUR	Mert Erdoğan (loan, to Türk Telekomspor)
-	GK	TUR	Serkan Kırıntılı (free, to Fenerbahçe)
-	MF	TUR	Abdullah Keseroğlu (loan, to Bugsaş Spor)

=== Antalyaspor ===
In: Note: Flags indicate national team as defined under FIFA eligibility rules; some limited exceptions apply. Players may hold more than one non-FIFA nationality.

No.	Pos.	Nation	Player
24	DF	TUR	Deniz Barış (free, from Fenerbahçe)
-	MF	TUR	Kerem Şeras (free, from Gençlerbirliği)
14	DF	BIH	Ivan Radeljić (free, from Gençlerbirliği)
35	DF	TUR	Tuna Üzümcü (free, from Bursaspor)
32	DF	TUR	Yenal Tuncer (loan, from Bursaspor)
39	DF	TUR	İlkem Özkaynak (free, from Ankaragücü)
99	FW	TUR	Kenan Özer (free, from Beşiktaş)
12	MF	FRA	Grégory Proment (free, from (France) SM Caen)
6	DF	TUR	Erkan Sekman (undisclosed, from Gaziantepspor)
86	FW	BRA	Tita (loan, from Ankaraspor)
33	GK	FRA	Sammy N'Djock (undisclosed, from (France) Lille)
-	MF	TUR	Uğur İnceman (free, from Beşiktaş)
-	MF	ENG	Aryan Taj (free, from (England) Maidenhead United F.C.)

Out: Note: Flags indicate national team as defined under FIFA eligibility rules; some limited exceptions apply. Players may hold more than one non-FIFA nationality.

No.	Pos.	Nation	Player
-	DF	TUR	Şenol Can (free, to Gaziantepspor)
-	FW	SRI	Emmanuel Figo Kabia (loan,to)
-	DF	TUR	Yalçın Ayhan (free, to Gaziantepspor)
-	MF	TUR	Fatih Ceylan (free, to Karabükspor)
-	MF	TUR	Hakan Özmert (free, to Karabükspor)
-	DF	TUR	Kerim Zengin (free, to Karabükspor)
-	DF	TUR	Vahap Işık (free, to Giresunspor)
-	FW	ISR	Pini Balili (free, to (Israel) Bnei Yehuda)
-	MF	TUR	Korhan Öztürk (free, to Kasımpaşa S.K.)
-	DF	TUR	Orhan Ak (free, to Bucaspor)
-	DF	MNE	Radoslav Batak (free, to (Montenegro) FK Mogren)
-	GK	TUR	Hasan Sönmez (free transfer)
-	MF	TUR	Tunahan Bilgin (loan, to Altınordu S.K.)

=== Beşiktaş ===
In: Note: Flags indicate national team as defined under FIFA eligibility rules; some limited exceptions apply. Players may hold more than one non-FIFA nationality.

No.	Pos.	Nation	Player
7	MF	POR	Ricardo Quaresma (€7,200,000, from (Italy) Inter)
9	MF	GER	Roberto Hilbert (free, from (Germany) VfB Stuttgart)
99	GK	TUR	Cenk Gönen (€1,000,000+part-exchange, from Denizlispor)
-	FW	TUR	Volkan Ekici (undisclosed, from (Germany) Borussia Dortmund)
22	DF	AUS	Ersan Gülüm (loan, from Adanaspor)
14	MF	ESP	Guti (free, from (Spain) Real Madrid)
4	MF	TUR	Mehmet Aurelio (free, from (Spain) Real Betis)
33	FW	TUR	Fatih Tekke (€750,000, from (Russia) FC Rubin Kazan)
-	FW	TUR	Kemal Akbaba (free, from Gençlerbirliği)
31	FW	POR	Simão Sabrosa (free, from (Spain) Atlético Madrid)

Out: Note: Flags indicate national team as defined under FIFA eligibility rules; some limited exceptions apply. Players may hold more than one non-FIFA nationality.

No.	Pos.	Nation	Player
-	MF	TUR	Serdar Özkan (free, to Galatasaray)
-	FW	TUR	Batuhan Karadeniz (€2,100,000, to Eskişehirspor)
-	FW	TUR	Kenan Özer (free, to Antalyaspor)
-	DF	CRO	Gordon Schildenfeld (€300,000, to (Austria) Sturm Graz)
-	MF	TUR	Erkan Zengin (unknown, to Eskişehirspor)
-	MF	TUR	Soner Ergençay (free, to Balıkesirspor)
-	DF	TUR	Emre Özkan (free, to Orduspor)
-	MF	TUR	Orhan Gülle (free, to Gaziantepspor)
-	MF	TUR	Can Gümrükçü (free, to Göztepe)
-	DF	TUR	Mehmet Sedef (free, to Konyaspor)
-	DF	TUR	Erdem Özkurt (loan, to Gaziosmanpaşaspor)
-	FW	TUR	Gökhan Aydaş (loan, to Bugsaş Spor)
-	MF	TUR	Burak Ateş (loan, to Gaziosmanpaşaspor)
-	MF	TUR	Abdullah Eryılmaz (loan, to Gümüşhanespor)
-	MF	TUR	Metin Erdem (free transfer)
-	MF	TUR	Özgür Özkaya (loan, to Beylerbeyi S.K.)
-	MF	CHI	Rodrigo Tello (free, to Eskişehirspor)
-	DF	TUR	Bülent Uzun (free, to Eyüpspor)
-	FW	TUR	Can Erdem (free, to Denizlispor)
-	FW	TUR	Emir Gökçe (free transfer)
-	FW	TUR	Emre İncemollaoğlu (loan, to Samsunspor)
-	FW	TUR	Erkam Reşmen (loan, to Gaziantep B.B.)
-	DF	TUR	Ethem Yılmaz (loan, to Gaziosmanpaşaspor)
-	DF	TUR	Sezer Özmen (loan, to Çaykur Rizespor)
-	MF	TUR	Erkan Kaş (loan, to Çaykur Rizespor)
-	MF	TUR	Uğur İnceman (free, to Antalyaspor)
-	DF	TUR	Gökhan Çalışır (loan, to Bugsaş Spor)
-	DF	TUR	Buğraç Han Yalçınkaya (free, to Kasımpaşa S.K.)

=== Bucaspor ===
In: Note: Flags indicate national team as defined under FIFA eligibility rules; some limited exceptions apply. Players may hold more than one non-FIFA nationality.

No.	Pos.	Nation	Player
—	GK	ANG	Carlos Fernandes (free, from (Portugal) Rio Ave F.C.)
—	FW	SEN	Victor Mendy (free, from (France) FC Metz)
—	MF	CRO	Jerko Leko (unknown, from (France) AS Monaco)
-	MF	TUR	Serkan Atak (unknown, from Hacettepespor)
-	MF	TUR	Atahan Menekşe (unknown, from Kocaelispor)
-	MF	TUR	Musa Aydın (free, from Sivasspor)
-	MF	TUR	Oğuz Başaran (80,000 TL, from Darıca Gençlerbirliği)
-	MF	TUR	İbrahim Dağaşan (unknown, from Sivasspor)
-	DF	CRO	Stjepan Tomas (free, from Gaziantepspor)
-	GK	TUR	Ömer Kahveci (free, from Adana Demirspor)
-	DF	BEL	Landry Mulemo (free, from (Belgium) Standard Liège)
-	DF	TUR	Kadir Atkın (100,000 TL, from Altınordu)
-	MF	TUR	Kamil Ahmet Çörekçi (unknown, from (England) Millwall)
-	FW	TUR	Ergun Cengiz (free, from Yeni Malatyaspor)
-	MF	BRA	Jean Santos Santiago (unknown, from (Brazil) Linhares)
-	FW	CPV	Dady (unknown, from (Spain) Osasuna)
-	MF	TUR	Ragıp Başdağ (free, from Eskişehirspor)
-	DF	TUR	Orhan Ak (free, from Antalyaspor)
-	FW	TUR	Emre Aktaş (loan, from Adanaspor)
-	MF	TUR	Aydın Karabulut (loan, from Ankaraspor)
-	DF	TUR	Ediz Bahtiyaroğlu (loan, from Ankaraspor)
-	FW	ANG	Manucho (loan, from (Spain) Real Valladolid)
-	DF	TUR	Koray Çölgeçen (undisclosed, from Ankaraspor)
-	MF	TUR	Onur Tuncer (free transfer)
-	FW	FRA	Mohamed Dahmane (unknown, from Club Brugge K.V.)
-	MF	TUR	Ali Güneş (free, from Kasımpaşa S.K.)

Out: Note: Flags indicate national team as defined under FIFA eligibility rules; some limited exceptions apply. Players may hold more than one non-FIFA nationality.

No.	Pos.	Nation	Player
-	FW	TUR	Mehmet Batdal (free, to Galatasaray)
-	GK	TUR	Cenk Tekelioğlu (unknown, to Altay)
-	FW	TUR	Türker Demirhan (free, to Göztepe)
-	MF	TUR	Yakup Sertkaya (free, to Balıkesirspor)
-	MF	TUR	Yılmaz Özlem (free, to Göztepe)
-	DF	TUR	İzzet Kaya (undisclosed, to Göztepe)
-	MF	TUR	Murat Karakoç (free, to Altay)
-	DF	TUR	Cem Kargın (free transfer)
-	FW	TUR	Yunus Altun (free transfer)
-	DF	TUR	Alişan Ural (free transfer)
-	MF	TUR	Serkan Atak (undisclosed, to Çaykur Rizespor)
-	MF	TUR	Ali Akkaynak (free transfer)
-	FW	TUR	Onur Çubukçu (free transfer)
-	MF	TUR	Oğuz Başaran (loan, to Adana Demirspor)
-	MF	TUR	Aytaç Deniz (free transfer)
-	GK	TUR	Barış Türkmen (free transfer)
-	DF	TUR	Emrecan Afacanoğlu (free transfer)
-	FW	TUR	İbrahim İdis (free transfer)
-	FW	TUR	Mahmut Ortak (free transfer)
-	??	TUR	Mehmet İncebacak (free transfer)
-	FW	TUR	Melih Vardar (free transfer)
-	FW	TUR	Mert Özcanlar (free transfer)
-	FW	TUR	Savaş Kulan (free transfer)
-	MF	TUR	Sertaç Suner (free transfer)
-	MF	BRA	Jean Santos Santiago (free transfer)

=== Bursaspor ===
In: Note: Flags indicate national team as defined under FIFA eligibility rules; some limited exceptions apply. Players may hold more than one non-FIFA nationality.

No.	Pos.	Nation	Player
3	DF	BRA	Gökçek Vederson (free, from Fenerbahçe)
89	GK	TUR	Harun Tekin (undisclosed, from Güngören Belediye Spor)
7	MF	ARG	Federico Insúa (undisclosed, from (Mexico) Club América)
19	MF	ARG	Damián Steinert (free, from (Argentina) Racing Club)
55	DF	SRB	Milan Stepanov (undisclosed, from (Portugal) F.C. Porto)
29	FW	ARG	Leonel Núñez (undsiclosed, from (Argentina) Independiente)
—	DF	TUR	Gökhan Göz (free, from Fenerbahçe)
-	MF	SWE	Gustav Svensson (unknown, from IFK Göteborg)

Out: Note: Flags indicate national team as defined under FIFA eligibility rules; some limited exceptions apply. Players may hold more than one non-FIFA nationality.

No.	Pos.	Nation	Player
-	DF	TUR	Tuna Üzümcü (free, to Antalyaspor)
-	DF	TUR	Yenal Tuncer (loan, to Antalyaspor)
-	FW	ARG	Leo Iglesias (free transfer)
-	MF	TUR	Veli Acar (undisclosed, to Konyaspor)
-	GK	TUR	Ceyhun Demircan (loan, to Yalovaspor)
-	DF	TUR	Emrah Kiraz (loan, to Eyüpspor)
-	DF	TUR	Koray Öztürk (free transfer)
-	FW	TUR	Halil Zeybek (loan, to Diyarbakırspor)
-	MF	TUR	Gökhan Vuran (free, to Konya Şekerspor)
-	DF	TUR	Selcan Pekkanlı (free, to Oyak Renaultspor)
-	MF	TUR	İsmail Özgür Göktaş (loan, to Güngören Belediyespor)

=== Eskişehirspor ===
In: Note: Flags indicate national team as defined under FIFA eligibility rules; some limited exceptions apply. Players may hold more than one non-FIFA nationality.

No.	Pos.	Nation	Player
—	FW	TUR	Batuhan Karadeniz (€2,100,000, from Beşiktaş)
—	MF	TUR	Burhan Eşer (€600,000, from Gençlerbirliği)
—	FW	TUR	Emre Aygün (unknown, from Ankaragücü)
—	MF	TUR	Erkan Zengin (unknown, from Beşiktaş)
—	DF	TUR	Tunay Acar (unknown, from (Germany) SV Wehen Wiesbaden)
—	MF	TUR	Salih Altın (unknown, from (Germany) Wuppertaler SV Borussia)
—	MF	POR	Pelé (€420,000, from (Portugal) Porto)
—	MF	CHI	Rodrigo Tello (free, from Beşiktaş)

Out: Note: Flags indicate national team as defined under FIFA eligibility rules; some limited exceptions apply. Players may hold more than one non-FIFA nationality.

No.	Pos.	Nation	Player
-	FW	TUR	Mehmet Yılmaz (free, to Gaziantepspor)
-	DF	EGY	Abdelzaher El Saka (free, to (Egypt) ENPPI)
-	MF	CRO	Stjepan Poljak (free, to (Croatia) Slaven Belupo)
-	FW	TUR	Abdullah Halman (free, to Gaziantep B.B.)
-	DF	TUR	Ahmet Sağlam (free, to Göztepe)
-	FW	TUR	Ömer Yalçın (free, to Kayseri Erciyesspor)
-	MF	TUR	Ragıp Başdağ (free, to Bucaspor)
-	DF	TUR	Murat Önür (free transfer)
-	MF	TUR	Selçuk Alibaz (free transfer)
-	DF	TUR	Tarık Mayhoş (free transfer)
-	DF	TUR	Özgür Öcal (free, to Kasımpaşa S.K.)
-	DF	CRO	Luka Vucko (free transfer)

=== Fenerbahçe ===
In: Note: Flags indicate national team as defined under FIFA eligibility rules; some limited exceptions apply. Players may hold more than one non-FIFA nationality.

No.	Pos.	Nation	Player
11	MF	SVK	Miroslav Stoch (€5,500,000, from (England) Chelsea)
6	DF	TUR	İlhan Eker (free, from Gençlerbirliği)
88	MF	TUR	Caner Erkin (€2,000,000, from (Russia) CSKA Moskva)
92	FW	SEN	Issiar Dia (€6,500,000, from (France) Nancy)
7	FW	SEN	Mamadou Niang (€8,000,000, from (France) Olympique Marseille)
85	GK	TUR	Serkan Kırıntılı (free, from Ankaragücü)
3	MF	NGA	Joseph Yobo (loan, from (England) Everton F.C.)

Out: Note: Flags indicate national team as defined under FIFA eligibility rules; some limited exceptions apply. Players may hold more than one non-FIFA nationality.

No.	Pos.	Nation	Player
-	DF	TUR	Deniz Barış (free, to Antalyaspor)
-	MF	TUR	Ali Bilgin (free, to Kayserispor)
-	DF	BRA	Gökçek Vederson (free, to Bursaspor)
-	DF	TUR	Önder Turacı (free, to Kayserispor)
-	GK	TUR	Volkan Babacan (loan, to Kayserispor)
-	MF	BRA	Deivid (free, to (Brazil) Flamengo)
-	MF	TUR	Gürhan Gürsoy (free, to Bugsaş Spor)
-	FW	TUR	Furkan Aydın (loan, to Çankırı Belediyespor)

=== Galatasaray ===
In: Note: Flags indicate national team as defined under FIFA eligibility rules; some limited exceptions apply. Players may hold more than one non-FIFA nationality.

No.	Pos.	Nation	Player
21	MF	BIH	Zvjezdan Misimović (€7,000,000, from (Germany) VfL Wolfsburg)
6	DF	ARG	Emiliano Insúa (on loan for €750,000 from (England) Liverpool)
77	MF	TUR	Serdar Özkan (free, from Beşiktaş)
11	FW	TUR	Mehmet Batdal (free, from Bucaspor)
4	DF	TUR	Ali Turan (free, from Kayserispor)
35	MF	TUR	Musa Çağıran (€500,000, from Altay)
3	DF	TUR	Çağlar Birinci (€1,500,000+part-exchange, from Denizlispor)
19	MF	ALB	Lorik Cana (€6,000,000, from (England) Sunderland)
20	MF	COL	Juan Pablo Pino (€3,000,000, from (France) AS Monaco)
—	FW	TUR	İbrahim Selen (free, from Adana Demirspor)

Out: Note: Flags indicate national team as defined under FIFA eligibility rules; some limited exceptions apply. Players may hold more than one non-FIFA nationality.

No.	Pos.	Nation	Player
-	MF	TUR	Mehmet Topal (€5,000,000, to (Spain) Valencia)
-	GK	TUR	Fırat Kocaoğlu (part-exchange, to Denizlispor)
-	DF	TUR	Semih Kaya (loan, to Kartalspor)
-	DF	TUR	Murat Akça (part-exchange, to Denizlispor)
-	FW	TUR	Erhan Şentürk (loan, to Kartalspor)
-	MF	TUR	Serdar Eylik (loan (part-exchange), to Denizlispor)
-	DF	TUR	Uğur Uçar (€650,000, to Ankaragücü)
-	DF	TUR	Emre Güngör (€1,000,000, to Gaziantepspor)
-	FW	CIV	Abdul Kader Keita (€8,150,000, (Qatar) to Al Sadd)
-	MF	ARG	Marcelo Carrusca (loan, (Argentina) to CA Banfield)
-	GK	ARG	Leo Franco (free, (Spain) to Real Zaragoza)
-	GK	TUR	Ersel Çetinkaya (free, to Eyüpspor)
-	DF	TUR	Uğur Demirok (loan, to Kartalspor)
-	MF	TUR	Oğuz Sabankay (free, to Kartalspor)
-	FW	TUR	Özgürcan Özcan (€130,000, to Ankaragücü)
-	FW	TUR	Fatih Sercan Ekinci (loan, to Sarıyer)

=== Gaziantepspor ===
In: Note: Flags indicate national team as defined under FIFA eligibility rules; some limited exceptions apply. Players may hold more than one non-FIFA nationality.

No.	Pos.	Nation	Player
—	FW	TUR	Mehmet Yılmaz (free, from Eskişehirspor)
—	DF	TUR	Şenol Can (free, from Antalyaspor)
—	DF	TUR	Yalçın Ayhan (free, from Antalyaspor)
—	DF	TUR	Elyasa Süme (free, from Ankaragücü)
—	DF	TUR	Emre Güngör (€1,000,000, from Galatasaray)
—	FW	TUR	Alper Akçam (unknown, from (Germany) Kaiserslautern)
—	MF	TUR	Orhan Gülle (free, from Beşiktaş)
—	FW	ARG	Ismael Sosa (€3,500,000, from (Argentina) Independiente)
—	MF	BUL	Ivelin Popov (€1,500,000, from (Bulgaria) Litex Lovech)
—	DF	CMR	Dany Nounkeu (undisclosed, from (France) Toulouse FC)

Out: Note: Flags indicate national team as defined under FIFA eligibility rules; some limited exceptions apply. Players may hold more than one non-FIFA nationality.

No.	Pos.	Nation	Player
-	DF	CRO	Stjepan Tomas (free, to Bucaspor)
-	GK	TUR	Recep Biler (unknown, to Manisaspor)
-	DF	TUR	Erkan Sekman (free, to Antalyaspor)
-	DF	CMR	Armand Deumi (free, to Karabükspor)
-	MF	TUR	Muhammet Kaya (undisclosed, to Gaziantep B.B.)
-	FW	TUR	Ümit Tütünci (undisclosed, to Giresunspor)
-	MF	TUR	Hakan Bayraktar (free, to Samsunspor)
-	MF	TUR	Mehmet Yozgatlı (unknown, to Gençlerbirliği)

=== Gençlerbirliği ===
In: Note: Flags indicate national team as defined under FIFA eligibility rules; some limited exceptions apply. Players may hold more than one non-FIFA nationality.

No.	Pos.	Nation	Player
—	MF	SCO	Michael Stewart (free, from (Scotland) Hearts F.C.)
—	FW	GER	Mehmet Akgün (free, from (Netherlands) Willem II Tilburg)
—	FW	IRL	Billy Mehmet (free, from (Scotland) St Mirren F.C.)
—	FW	BIH	Ermin Zec (2.200.000 €, from (Croatia) HNK Šibenik)
—	DF	ALB	Debatik Curri (undisclosed, from (Ukraine) Vorskla Poltava)
—	FW	ALB	Bekim Bala (undisclosed, from (Albania) FK Vllaznia)
—	MF	TUR	Oktay Delibalta (free, from Samsunspor)
—	DF	TUR	Haluk Ulaşoğlu (free, from Elazığspor)
—	MF	AUT	Cem Atan (undisclosed, from (Austria) SV Mattersburg)
—	FW	NZL	Shane Smeltz (undisclosed, from (New Zealand) Gold Coast United FC)
—	MF	TUR	Mehmet Yozgatlı (unknown, from Gaziantepspor)

Out: Note: Flags indicate national team as defined under FIFA eligibility rules; some limited exceptions apply. Players may hold more than one non-FIFA nationality.

No.	Pos.	Nation	Player
-	DF	TUR	İlhan Eker (free, to Fenerbahçe)
-	MF	BRA	Tozo (free, to Karabükspor)
-	FW	BRA	Kahê (free, to Manisaspor)
-	MF	TUR	Kerem Şeras (free, to Antalyaspor)
-	DF	BIH	Ivan Radeljić (free, to Antalyaspor)
-	DF	TUR	Burhan Eşer (€600,000, to Eskişehirspor)
-	FW	BRA	Sandro (free, to (Brazil) Coritiba)
-	MF	TUR	Mehmet Akyüz (free, to TKİ Tavşanlı Linyitspor)
-	DF	TUR	Celal Aras (free, to Güngören Belediyespor)
-	FW	SWE	Sinan Ayrancı (loan, to (Sweden) IF Brommapojkarna, transfer to (Sweden) Hammarby IF)
-	MF	TUR	Yasir Elmacı (free, to Altay S.K.)

=== İstanbul Belediyespor ===
In: Note: Flags indicate national team as defined under FIFA eligibility rules; some limited exceptions apply. Players may hold more than one non-FIFA nationality.

No.	Pos.	Nation	Player
—	MF	TUR	Cenk Şahin (unknown, from Zonguldakspor)
—	DF	TUR	Mehmet Yılmaz (unknown, from Siirtspor)
—	MF	TUR	Cihan Haspolatlı (free, from Ankaragücü)
—	MF	SWE	Samuel Holmén (undisclosed, from (Denmark) Brøndby)

Out: Note: Flags indicate national team as defined under FIFA eligibility rules; some limited exceptions apply. Players may hold more than one non-FIFA nationality.

No.	Pos.	Nation	Player
-	GK	TUR	Mehmet Ali Tunç (free, to Giresunspor)
-	DF	GUI	Kanfory Sylla (unknown, to Konyaspor)

=== Kardemir Karabükspor ===
In: Note: Flags indicate national team as defined under FIFA eligibility rules; some limited exceptions apply. Players may hold more than one non-FIFA nationality.

No.	Pos.	Nation	Player
—	MF	BRA	Tozo (free, from Gençlerbirliği)
—	MF	TUR	Fatih Ceylan (free, from Antalyaspor)
—	DF	TUR	Kerim Zengin (free, from Antalyaspor)
—	MF	TUR	Hakan Özmert (free, from Antalyaspor)
—	GK	CRO	Vjekoslav Tomić (undisclosed, (Croatia) Hajduk Split)
—	MF	UGA	Hassan Wasswa (€200,000, (South Africa) F.C. Cape Town)
—	FW	BUL	Emil Angelov (undisclosed, from Denizlispor)
—	MF	TUR	Mehmet Çoğum (undisclosed, from Denizlispor)
—	GK	TUR	Mustafa Demir (undisclosed, from Erdemli Gençlerbirliği)
—	MF	ROU	Florin Cernat (undisclosed, (Croatia) Hajduk Split)
—	FW	NGA	Emmanuel Emenike (€300,000, (South Africa) F.C. Cape Town)
-	DF	CMR	Armand Deumi (free, from Gaziantepspor)
-	DF	CRO	Anthony Šerić (free, from (Croatia) Hajduk Split)
-	DF	MAR	Jamal Alioui (free, from (Switzerland) FC Sion)

Out: Note: Flags indicate national team as defined under FIFA eligibility rules; some limited exceptions apply. Players may hold more than one non-FIFA nationality.

No.	Pos.	Nation	Player
-	GK	TUR	Ferhat Odabaşı (undisclosed, to Boluspor)
-	DF	TUR	Gökhan Güney (free, to Boluspor)
-	DF	TUR	Ömer Ateş (undisclosed, to Boluspor)
-	FW	TUR	Burak Akdiş (undisclosed, to Boluspor)
-	MF	TUR	Recep Yaşar (undisclosed, to Gaziantep B.B.)
-	GK	TUR	Kazım Sarı (free, to Gaziantep B.B.)
-	FW	TUR	Aydın Çetin (undisclosed, to Giresunspor)
-	DF	TUR	Aydın Arslan (undisclosed, to Ankaraspor)

=== Kasımpaşa ===
In: Note: Flags indicate national team as defined under FIFA eligibility rules; some limited exceptions apply. Players may hold more than one non-FIFA nationality.

No.	Pos.	Nation	Player
—	MF	BUL	Georgi Sarmov (free, (Bulgaria) Levski Sofia)
—	MF	BUL	Nikolay Dimitrov (free, (Bulgaria) Levski Sofia)
—	FW	TUR	Seyit Güner (free, (Belgium) Anderlecht)
—	DF	GHA	Abdul Rahim Sebah (free, (Belgium) Charleroi)
—	FW	TUR	Ersen Martin (free, from Manisaspor)
—	MF	TUR	Hüseyin Kala (free, from Etimesgut Şekerspor)
—	MF	ESP	Fernando Varela (free, (Spain) RCD Mallorca)
—	DF	BRA	Luiz Henrique (free transfer)
—	MF	TUR	Korhan Öztürk (free, from Antalyaspor)
-	MF	NAM	Razundara Tjikuzu (free, from Trabzonspor)
-	FW	CMR	Gustave Bebbe (unknown, from Diyarbakırspor)
-	DF	TUR	Özgür Öcal (free, from Eskişehirspor)

Out: Note: Flags indicate national team as defined under FIFA eligibility rules; some limited exceptions apply. Players may hold more than one non-FIFA nationality.

No.	Pos.	Nation	Player
-	MF	BRA	André Moritz (free, to Kayserispor)
-	MF	TUR	Murat Akın (free, to Orduspor)
-	MF	TUR	Sedat Yeşilkaya (undisclosed, to Sivasspor)
—	MF	TUR	Emre Toraman (free, to Konyaspor)
-	MF	TUR	Ali Güneş (free, to Bucaspor)

=== Kayserispor ===
In: Note: Flags indicate national team as defined under FIFA eligibility rules; some limited exceptions apply. Players may hold more than one non-FIFA nationality.

No.	Pos.	Nation	Player
—	FW	TUR	Abdülkadir Özgen (free, from (Germany) Alemannia Aachen)
—	DF	GER	Hamza Çakır (free, from (Germany) Fortuna Düsseldorf)
—	DF	GEO	Aleksandr Amisulashvili (free, from (Russia) Spartak Nalchik)
—	MF	TUR	Ali Bilgin (free, from Fenerbahçe)
—	MF	BRA	André Moritz (free, from Kasımpaşa)
—	FW	TUR	Uğur Albayrak (free, from (Germany) Kickers Offenbach)
—	MF	GER	Selim Teber (free, from (Germany) Eintracht Frankfurt)
—	MF	PAR	Jonathan Santana (€600,000, from (Germany) VfL Wolfsburg)
—	DF	TUR	Önder Turacı (free, from Fenerbahçe)
—	GK	TUR	Volkan Babacan (loan, from Fenerbahçe)
—	FW	URU	Marcelo Zalayeta (free, from (Italy) S.S.C. Napoli)
38	FW	ALG	Karim Ziani (loan, from (Germany) VfL Wolfsburg)

Out: Note: Flags indicate national team as defined under FIFA eligibility rules; some limited exceptions apply. Players may hold more than one non-FIFA nationality.

No.	Pos.	Nation	Player
-	DF	TUR	Ali Turan (free, to Galatasaray)
-	DF	TUR	Aydın Toscalı (free, to Ankaragücü)
-	DF	TUR	Bayram Çetin (undisclosed, to Göztepe)
-	DF	TUR	Hakan Aslantaş (€700,000, to Konyaspor)
-	MF	TUR	Gökhan Emreciksin (€1,000,000, to Manisaspor)
-	DF	PAR	Delio Toledo (free transfer)
-	MF	CMR	Alioum Saidou (free, to Sivasspor)

=== Konyaspor ===
In: Note: Flags indicate national team as defined under FIFA eligibility rules; some limited exceptions apply. Players may hold more than one non-FIFA nationality.

No.	Pos.	Nation	Player
—	DF	BFA	Mahamoudou Kéré (free, from (Belgium) Charleroi)
—	DF	TUR	Adnan Güngör (free, from Diyarbakırspor)
—	MF	TUR	Caner Ağca (free, from Mersin İdman Yurdu)
—	GK	TUR	Gökhan Tokgöz (free, from Diyarbakırspor)
—	DF	DEN	Jonas Troest (free, from (Denmark) Odense Boldklub)
—	MF	TUR	Burak Karaduman (free, from Diyarbakırspor)
—	GK	AUS	Danny Vukovic (undisclosed, from (Australia) Central Coast Mariners)
—	FW	TUR	Aykut Öztürk (undisclosed, from (Germany) SV Wehen Wiesbaden)
—	DF	TUR	Emrah Eren (undisclosed, from Giresunspor)
—	DF	IRQ	Bassim Abbas (undisclosed, from Diyarbakırspor)
—	DF	TUR	Serkan Şahin (undisclosed, from (Switzerland) Basel)
—	DF	TUR	Hakan Aslantaş (€700,000, from Kayserispor)
—	MF	COL	Johnnier Montaño (loan, from (Peru) Alianza Lima)
—	MF	TUR	Veli Acar (undisclosed, from Bursaspor)
—	MF	TUR	İshak Çakmak (undisclosed, from Konya Şekerspor)
—		TUR	Feridun Yıkılmaz (undisclosed, from Konya Telekomspor)
—	MF	CZE	Bořek Dočkal (loan, from (Czech Republic) FC Slovan Liberec)
—	DF	TUR	Erdinç Yavuz (free, from Diyarbakırspor)
—	FW	CRO	Andrej Kerić (undisclosed, from (Czech Republic) FC Slovan Liberec)
—	DF	TUR	Emre Toraman (free, from Kasımpaşa)
-	DF	GUI	Kanfory Sylla (unknown, from İstanbul B.B.)
-	FW	GUI	Ibrahima Bangoura (unknown, from Denizlispor)

Out: Note: Flags indicate national team as defined under FIFA eligibility rules; some limited exceptions apply. Players may hold more than one non-FIFA nationality.

No.	Pos.	Nation	Player
—	DF	TUR	Volkan Koçaloğlu (free, to Giresunspor)
—	GK	TUR	Haluk Tanrıseven (free, to Göztepe)
—	MF	TUR	Yusuf Kurtuluş (free transfer)
—	FW	TUR	Ferdi Başoda (free transfer)
—	MF	TUR	Abdülvahit Karacabey (free, to Göztepe)
—	DF	TUR	Uğur Akdemir (free transfer)
—	MF	TUR	Zafer Demir (free transfer)
—	FW	TUR	Mehmet Şen (free, to Altay)
—	MF	TUR	Umut Kekilli (free transfer)
—	DF	TUR	Koray İçten (free transfer)
—	FW	TUR	Tayfun Türkmen (free, to Ankaraspor)
—	MF	TUR	Mehmet Ayaz (free, to Kayseri Erciyesspor)
—	DF	TUR	Ömer Hacısalihoğlu (free, to Giresunspor)
—	GK	TUR	Eray Birnican (free transfer)
—	MF	TUR	Dursun Karatay (free transfer)

=== Manisaspor ===
In: Note: Flags indicate national team as defined under FIFA eligibility rules; some limited exceptions apply. Players may hold more than one non-FIFA nationality.

No.	Pos.	Nation	Player
—	FW	POR	Ariza Makukula (€2,500,000, from S.L. Benfica)
—	FW	BRA	Kahê (free, from Gençlerbirliği)
—	MF	TUR	Semavi Özgür (free, from Ankaragücü)
—	GK	TUR	Recep Biler (unknown, from Gaziantepspor)
—	MF	TUR	Gökhan Emreciksin (€1,000,000, from Kayserispor)
—	DF	TUR	Ömer Aysan Barış (free transfer)
—	FW	NGA	Isaac Promise (€500,000, from Trabzonspor)
—	MF	ROU	Nicolae Dică (loan, from (Italy) Catania)

Out: Note: Flags indicate national team as defined under FIFA eligibility rules; some limited exceptions apply. Players may hold more than one non-FIFA nationality.

No.	Pos.	Nation	Player
—	MF	TUR	Mehmet Nas (free, to Sivasspor)
—	MF	TUR	Güven Varol (free, to Ankaragücü)
—	FW	TUR	Ersen Martin (free, to Kasımpaşa)
—	MF	TUR	Kemal Okyay (unknown, to Adanaspor)
—	MF	TUR	Mustafa Aşan (free, to Akhisar Belediyespor)

=== Sivasspor ===
In: Note: Flags indicate national team as defined under FIFA eligibility rules; some limited exceptions apply. Players may hold more than one non-FIFA nationality.

No.	Pos.	Nation	Player
—	MF	TUR	Ceyhun Eriş (free, from (Sweden) Assyriska)
—	MF	TUR	Mehmet Nas (free, from Manisaspor)
—	MF	TUR	Sedat Yeşilkaya (unknown, from Kasımpaşa)
—	FW	BOL	Ricardo Pedriel (€100,000 (loan), from (Romania) Steaua București)
—	DF	LVA	Denis Ivanovs (undisclosed, from (South Africa) Ajax Cape Town)
—	GK	BIH	Sead Ramović (undisclosed, from (Norway) Tromsø IL)
-	MF	CMR	Alioum Saidou (free, from Kayserispor)

Out: Note: Flags indicate national team as defined under FIFA eligibility rules; some limited exceptions apply. Players may hold more than one non-FIFA nationality.

No.	Pos.	Nation	Player
—	MF	TUR	Musa Aydın (free, to Bucaspor)
—	MF	TUR	İbrahim Dağaşan (undisclosed, to Bucaspor)
—	GK	AUS	Michael Petkovic (free, to (Australia) Melbourne)
—	FW	NGA	Akeem Agbetu (undisclosed, to Samsunspor)
—	DF	TUR	Yasin Çakmak (free, to Denizlispor)
—	DF	CGO	Lucien Aubey (free transfer)
—	DF	COD	Pieter Mbemba (free transfer)

=== Trabzonspor ===
In: Note: Flags indicate national team as defined under FIFA eligibility rules; some limited exceptions apply. Players may hold more than one non-FIFA nationality.

No.	Pos.	Nation	Player
—	DF	POL	Arkadiusz Glowacki (1.200.000 €, from (Poland) Wisła Kraków)
-	GK	TUR	Bora Sevim (undisclosed, from Gaziantep B.B.)
-	MF	TUR	Barış Ataş (free, from Diyarbakırspor)
—	FW	BRA	Jajá (4.200.000 €, from (Ukraine) Metalist Kharkiv)

Out: Note: Flags indicate national team as defined under FIFA eligibility rules; some limited exceptions apply. Players may hold more than one non-FIFA nationality.

No.	Pos.	Nation	Player
-	FW	NGA	Isaac Promise (€500,000, to Manisaspor)
—	DF	TUR	Sami Büyüktopaç (loan, to (Belgium) KV Turnhout)
—	DF	TUR	Yakup Bugun (free, to Denizlispor)
-	DF	CMR	Rigobert Song (free transfer)
-	MF	NAM	Razundara Tjikuzu (free, to Kasımpaşa S.K.)
-	GK	SEN	Tony Sylva (free transfer)
-	MF	BEL	Christian Brüls (free, to (Belgium) K.V.C. Westerlo)
-	MF	TUR	Kadir Keleş (free transfer)
-	FW	TUR	Eren Görür (free transfer)
-	MF	TUR	Selçuk Yıldırım (free transfer)
—	MF	YUG	Drago Gabrić (loan, to Ankaragücü)
—	MF	TUR	Barış Memiş (loan, to Karşıyaka S.K.)

== First League ==
=== Akhisar Belediyespor ===
In: Note: Flags indicate national team as defined under FIFA eligibility rules; some limited exceptions apply. Players may hold more than one non-FIFA nationality.

No.	Pos.	Nation	Player

Out: Note: Flags indicate national team as defined under FIFA eligibility rules; some limited exceptions apply. Players may hold more than one non-FIFA nationality.

No.	Pos.	Nation	Player

=== Ankaraspor ===
In: Note: Flags indicate national team as defined under FIFA eligibility rules; some limited exceptions apply. Players may hold more than one non-FIFA nationality.

No.	Pos.	Nation	Player

Out: Note: Flags indicate national team as defined under FIFA eligibility rules; some limited exceptions apply. Players may hold more than one non-FIFA nationality.

No.	Pos.	Nation	Player

=== Boluspor ===
In: Note: Flags indicate national team as defined under FIFA eligibility rules; some limited exceptions apply. Players may hold more than one non-FIFA nationality.

No.	Pos.	Nation	Player
—	GK	TUR	Ferhat Odabaşı (unknown, from Karabükspor)
—	DF	TUR	Gökhan Güney (free, from Karabükspor)
—	FW	TUR	Burak Akdiş (unknown, from Karabükspor)
—	DF	TUR	Özgür Bayer (free, from Giresunspor)
—	DF	TUR	Doğan Altınkaya (free, from Türk Telekomspor)
—	DF	TUR	Ömer Ateş (unknown, from Karabükspor)

Out: Note: Flags indicate national team as defined under FIFA eligibility rules; some limited exceptions apply. Players may hold more than one non-FIFA nationality.

No.	Pos.	Nation	Player
—	DF	TUR	İbrahim Yavuz (unknown, to Kayseri Erciyesspor)
—	FW	TUR	Lokman Akyıldız (undisclosed, to Çankiri Belediyespor)
—	FW	TUR	Gürkan İzmirlioğlu (undisclosed, to Çankiri Belediyespor)

=== Çaykur Rizespor ===
In: Note: Flags indicate national team as defined under FIFA eligibility rules; some limited exceptions apply. Players may hold more than one non-FIFA nationality.

No.	Pos.	Nation	Player

Out: Note: Flags indicate national team as defined under FIFA eligibility rules; some limited exceptions apply. Players may hold more than one non-FIFA nationality.

No.	Pos.	Nation	Player

=== Denizlispor ===
In: Note: Flags indicate national team as defined under FIFA eligibility rules; some limited exceptions apply. Players may hold more than one non-FIFA nationality.

No.	Pos.	Nation	Player

Out: Note: Flags indicate national team as defined under FIFA eligibility rules; some limited exceptions apply. Players may hold more than one non-FIFA nationality.

No.	Pos.	Nation	Player
-	FW	GUI	Ibrahima Bangoura (unknown, to Konyaspor)

=== Diyarbakırspor ===
In: Note: Flags indicate national team as defined under FIFA eligibility rules; some limited exceptions apply. Players may hold more than one non-FIFA nationality.

No.	Pos.	Nation	Player

Out: Note: Flags indicate national team as defined under FIFA eligibility rules; some limited exceptions apply. Players may hold more than one non-FIFA nationality.

No.	Pos.	Nation	Player

=== Gaziantep Belediyespor ===
In: Note: Flags indicate national team as defined under FIFA eligibility rules; some limited exceptions apply. Players may hold more than one non-FIFA nationality.

No.	Pos.	Nation	Player

Out: Note: Flags indicate national team as defined under FIFA eligibility rules; some limited exceptions apply. Players may hold more than one non-FIFA nationality.

No.	Pos.	Nation	Player

=== Giresunspor ===
In: Note: Flags indicate national team as defined under FIFA eligibility rules; some limited exceptions apply. Players may hold more than one non-FIFA nationality.

No.	Pos.	Nation	Player

Out: Note: Flags indicate national team as defined under FIFA eligibility rules; some limited exceptions apply. Players may hold more than one non-FIFA nationality.

No.	Pos.	Nation	Player

=== Güngören Belediyespor ===
In: Note: Flags indicate national team as defined under FIFA eligibility rules; some limited exceptions apply. Players may hold more than one non-FIFA nationality.

No.	Pos.	Nation	Player

Out: Note: Flags indicate national team as defined under FIFA eligibility rules; some limited exceptions apply. Players may hold more than one non-FIFA nationality.

No.	Pos.	Nation	Player

=== Kartalspor ===
In: Note: Flags indicate national team as defined under FIFA eligibility rules; some limited exceptions apply. Players may hold more than one non-FIFA nationality.

No.	Pos.	Nation	Player

Out: Note: Flags indicate national team as defined under FIFA eligibility rules; some limited exceptions apply. Players may hold more than one non-FIFA nationality.

No.	Pos.	Nation	Player

=== Kayseri Erciyesspor ===
In: Note: Flags indicate national team as defined under FIFA eligibility rules; some limited exceptions apply. Players may hold more than one non-FIFA nationality.

No.	Pos.	Nation	Player
—	MF	TUR	Mehmet Ayaz (free, from Konyaspor)
—	DF	TUR	İbrahim Yavuz (unknown, from Boluspor)

Out: Note: Flags indicate national team as defined under FIFA eligibility rules; some limited exceptions apply. Players may hold more than one non-FIFA nationality.

No.	Pos.	Nation	Player

=== Mersin İdmanyurdu ===
See: 2010–11 Mersin İdmanyurdu summer transfers

=== Orduspor ===
In: Note: Flags indicate national team as defined under FIFA eligibility rules; some limited exceptions apply. Players may hold more than one non-FIFA nationality.

No.	Pos.	Nation	Player

Out: Note: Flags indicate national team as defined under FIFA eligibility rules; some limited exceptions apply. Players may hold more than one non-FIFA nationality.

No.	Pos.	Nation	Player

=== Samsunspor ===
In: Note: Flags indicate national team as defined under FIFA eligibility rules; some limited exceptions apply. Players may hold more than one non-FIFA nationality.

No.	Pos.	Nation	Player

Out: Note: Flags indicate national team as defined under FIFA eligibility rules; some limited exceptions apply. Players may hold more than one non-FIFA nationality.

No.	Pos.	Nation	Player

== See also ==
- 2010–11 Süper Lig
- 2010–11 TFF First League
