= Özgür =

- Gender: unisex

Origin
- Origin: Turkish
- Meaning: free and independent

Özgür (pronounced [ˈœzɟyɾ]) is a unisex Turkish given name and a surname meaning free and independent. Notable people with the name include:

== Given name ==
- Özgür Baran Aksaka (born 2003), Turkish-Bulgarian footballer
- Özgür Aktaş (born 1997), Dutch footballer
- Özgür Bayer (born 1979), Turkish football player
- Özgür Buldum (born 1976), Turkish music producer
- Özgür Can Özcan (born 1988), Turkish footballer
- Özgür Ceylan (boen 1973), Turkish businessperson and politician
- Özgür Çek (born 1991), Turkish professional footballer
- Özgür Çevik (born 1981), Turkish singer and actor
- Özgür Demirtaş (born 1975), Turkish economist
- Özgür Dengiz (born 1980), Turkish serial killer and cannibal
- Özgür Doğan (born 1978), Kurdish director
- Ozgur Ferhat (born 1985), Greek dentist and politician
- Özgür Gürbulak (born 1981), Turkish wheelchair basketballer
- Özgür İleri (born 1989), Turkish professional footballer
- Özgür Işıtan Gün (born 1975), Turkish businessman
- Özgür Kart (born 1982), Turkish football player
- Özgür Mumcu (born 1977), Turkish journalist
- Özgür Öçal (born 1981), Turkish football player
- Özgür Özata (born 1977), Turkish-German actor
- Özgür Özdemir (born 1995), Turkish footballer
- Özgür Özel (born 1974), Turkish politician
- Özgür Özkaya (born 1988), Turkish footballer
- Özgür Sert (born 2001), Turkish footballer
- Ozgur Uyanik, Turkish film director
- Özgür Varlık (born 1979), Turkish sport shooter
- Özgür Yasar (born 1981), Swedish footballer
- Özgür Yıldırım (born 1979), Turkish-German director
- Özgür Yılmaz (born 1986), Turkish footballer
- Özgür Yılmaz (born 1977), Turkish judoka

== Middle name ==
- Bertuğ Özgür Yıldırım (born 2002), Turkish footballer
- Halit Özgür Sarı (born 2006), Turkish actor and model
- İsmail Özgür Göktaş (born 1989), Turkish footballer
- Leyla Ozgur Alhassen, Turkish-American Quranic scholar

== Surname ==
- Alaattin Özgür (born 1965), Turkish former wrestler
- Batuhan Özgür (born 1998), Turkish cyclist
- Erman Özgür (born 1977), Turkish footballer
- İbrahim Özgür (1910–1959), Turkish tango composer and singer
- Mehmet Özgür (born 1970), Turkish actor
- Nesim Özgür (born 1973), Turkish-Bulgarian footballer
- Özker Özgür (1940-2005), Turkish-Cypriot politician
- Reyhan Özgür (born 1978), Turkish diplomat
- Semavi Özgür (born 1985), Turkish footballer
- Veysel Özgür (1877–1931), officer of the Ottoman Army and the Turkish Army

== See also ==
- Özgür, Ardeşen; village in Rize Province, Turkey
- Özgür Gündem (English: "Free Agenda"), Turkish newspaper
- Özgür Ülke, defunct Kurdish newspaper
- Ozgur Parti, Freedom and Reform Party, in the Turkish Republic of Northern Cyprus
