= 2003–04 Trabzonspor season =

Trabzonspor
2003–04 season
- President: Atay Aktuğ
- Manager: Ziya Doğan
- Stadium: Hüseyin Avni Aker Stadium
- Turkish Super League: 2nd
- Turkish Cup: winner
- Top goalscorer: Gökdeniz Karadeniz (14)

This article shows statistics of the club's players in the season.

In the 2003–2004 season Trabzonspor arrived second in Süper Lig. The top goalscorer of the team was Gökdeniz Karadeniz who scored 14 goals.

== Sponsor ==
- Fly Air

== Squad ==
Note: Flags indicate national team as defined under FIFA eligibility rules; some limited exceptions apply. Players may hold more than one non-FIFA nationality.

No.	Pos.	Nation	Player
1	GK	AUS	Michael Petkovic
2	MF	TUR	Bayram Bektaş
5	MF	TUR	Hüseyin Çimşir
6	DF	TUR	Recep Asıl
7	MF	BEL	Kurt Van De Paar
8	MF	BEL	Hans Somers
9	FW	TUR	Fatih Tekke
10	FW	TUR	Mehmet Yılmaz
11	FW	GUI	Ibrahim Yattara
13	FW	TUR	Cemre Atmaca
14	DF	SEN	Oumar Dieng
15	DF	TUR	Mehmet Kahriman
17	FW	TUR	Emre Aygün
18	DF	TUR	Tayfun Cora
19	MF	TUR	Hasan Üçüncü
20	MF	TUR	Yavuz Yılmaz

No.	Pos.	Nation	Player
21	MF	TUR	Ali Şen Kandil
22	MF	BLR	Maksim Romaschenko
24	DF	BEL	Karel D'Haene
25	DF	TUR	İbrahim Ege
26	GK	TUR	Hasan Sönmez
28	DF	TUR	Tolga Seyhan
29	FW	GHA	Augustine Ahinful
32	DF	TUR	Mustafa Yalçınkaya
33	DF	TUR	Emre Toraman
34	DF	TUR	Emrah Eren
35	FW	TUR	Göksel Yaman
38	DF	TUR	Erdinç Yavuz
47	MF	TUR	Volkan Bekiroğlu
61	MF	TUR	Gökdeniz Karadeniz
66	GK	TUR	Osman Kurtuldu

== Super Lig ==
Pos	Team	Pld	W	D	L	GF	GA	GD	Pts	Qualification or relegation
1	Fenerbahçe (C)	34	23	7	4	82	41	+41	76	Qualification to Champions League group stage (Note: FC Porto, winner of 2003–04 UEFA Champions League, qualified for the UEFA Champions League group stage by their league position, so the title holder spot couldn't be used and this spot goes to best excluded champions, champions of Turkey, originally qualified for the third qualifying round.)
2	Trabzonspor	34	22	6	6	60	38	+22	72	Qualification to Champions League second qualifying round
3	Beşiktaş	34	18	8	8	65	45	+20	62	Qualification to UEFA Cup first round
4	Gaziantepspor	34	18	3	13	52	51	+1	57	
5	Denizlispor	34	17	4	13	52	43	+9	55	

Rules for classification: 1) points; 2) goal difference; 3) number of goals scored.
(C) Champions

== Turkish Cup ==
=== First round ===
Team 1	Score	Team 2
Trabzonspor	3–1	Kayserispor

=== Second round ===
Team 1	Score	Team 2
Diyarbakırspor	0–1	Trabzonspor

=== Quarterfinals ===
Team 1	Score	Team 2
Trabzonspor	2–1 (aet)	Konyaspor

=== Semifinals ===
Team 1	Score	Team 2
İstanbulspor	0–2	Trabzonspor

=== Final ===
Team 1	Score	Team 2
Trabzonspor	4–0	Gençlerbirliği

== See also ==
- Süper Lig 2003–04
- 2003–04 Turkish Cup
