= Bekiroğlu =

Bekiroğlu is a surname. Notable people with the surname include:

- Aslı Bekiroğlu, Turkish actress
- Efkan Bekiroğlu, German footballer
- Nazan Bekiroğlu, Turkish novelist
- Vildan Pelin Bekiroğlu (born 1984), Turkish actress
- Volkan Kürşat Bekiroğlu, Turkish footballer
- Serkan Bekiroğlu, Turkish footballer

== See also ==
- Bekiroğlu, Gölyaka
