= Sedat =

Sedat is a masculine Turkish given name. Notable people with the name include:

- Sedat (singer), German-Turkish singer
- Sedat Ağçay, Turkish footballer
- Sedat Alp, Turkish archaeologist
- Sedat Artuç, Turkish weightlifter
- Sedat Bayrak, Turkish footballer
- Sedat Bucak, Turkish chieftain and politician
- Sedat Laçiner, Turkish academic
- Sedat Peker, Turkish businessman
- Sedat Sir, Australian rules footballer
- Sedat Yeşilkaya, Turkish footballer
