= Özgür Yılmaz =

Özgür Yılmaz may refer to:

- Özgür Yılmaz (footballer) (born 1986), Turkish footballer
- Özgür Yılmaz (judoka) (born 1977), Turkish judoka
