= Semavi =

Semavi is a Turkish given name. Notable people with the name include:

- Semavi Eyice (1922–2018), Turkish art historian and archaeologist
- Semavi Özgür (born 1982), Bulgarian-born Turkish football player
