= Isra Yazicioglu =

Quranic studies scholar

Umeyye Isra Yazicioglu is a Turkish scholar of religion. She is assistant professor in the Department of Theology and Religious Studies at Saint Joseph's University.

== Biography ==
Isra Yazicioglu attended Marmara University's School of Medicine from 1996 to 1999. She then completed a master's degree at Hartford Seminary in 2003, followed by a Ph.D. from the University of Virginia in 2007.

== Works ==
- Understanding the Qur’anic Miracle Stories in the Modern Age (2013)

== See also ==
- Leyla Ozgur Alhassen
