= Enes Kubat =

Turkish footballer

Personal information
- Date of birth: 1 March 1994 (age 32)
- Place of birth: Altındağ, Turkey
- Height: 1.78 m (5 ft 10 in)
- Position: Forward

Team information
- Current team: Hacettepe 1945 SK

Youth career
- 2006–2007: Doğanspor
- 2007–2010: Ankaraspor
- 2010–2012: Ankaragücü

Senior career*
Years	Team	Apps	(Gls)
2012–2013	Ankaragücü	18	(2)
2013–2015	Göztepe	40	(9)
2015	→ Kartalspor (loan)	10	(2)
2015–2018	Ankaragücü	62	(14)
2018–2019	Altınordu	9	(2)
2020	Ankaragücü	0	(0)
2020	→ Mamak (loan)	0	(0)
2020–2022	Mamak	21	(1)
2022–	Hacettepe 1945 SK	1	(0)
- * Club domestic league appearances and goals as of 12 November 2022

Enes Kubat (born 1 March 1994) is a Turkish professional footballer who plays for TFF Third League club Hacettepe 1945 SK. He made his Süper Lig debut on 12 February 2012.
