= Abdullah Keseroğlu =

Turkish footballer (born 1988)

Personal information
- Date of birth: 7 February 1988 (age 38)
- Place of birth: Hatay, Turkey
- Height: 1.75 m (5 ft 9 in)
- Position: Midfielder

Youth career
- –2006: Bayer Leverkusen

Senior career*
Years	Team	Apps	(Gls)
2006–2007	Bayer Leverkusen II	2	(0)
2007–2009	Borussia Mönchengladbach II	36	(3)
2009–2010	VfL Osnabrück	6	(0)
2010–2012	Ankaragücü	4	(0)
2010–2011	→ Bugsaşspor (loan)	22	(0)
2012–2013	Bucaspor	1	(0)
2013–2014	FC Homburg	9	(0)
2014–2015	Sportfreunde Siegen	28	(1)
2015–2017	SC Düsseldorf-West	45	(1)
2017–2018	SG Köln-Worringen		

International career
2003–2004	Turkey U16	6	(0)
2004	Turkey U17	1	(0)
2007	Turkey U19	2	(0)
- * Club domestic league appearances and goals

Abdullah Keseroğlu (born 7 February 1988) is a Turkish former professional footballer who played as a midfielder.
