= Emre Aktaş =

Turkish footballer

Personal information
- Full name: Emre Aktaş
- Date of birth: September 23, 1986 (age 40)
- Place of birth: Bursa, Turkey
- Height: 1.86 m (6 ft 1 in)
- Position: Forward

Team information
- Current team: Orhangazispor
- Number: 8

Youth career
- 1999–2003: Tofaş Spor
- 2003–2004: İnegölspor

Senior career*
Years	Team	Apps	(Gls)
2004–2005	İnegölspor	40	(11)
2005–2007	Ankaraspor	14	(2)
2006–2007	→ Keçiörengücü (loan)	24	(8)
2007	Malatyaspor	6	(0)
2008–2012	Adanaspor	71	(25)
2010–2011	→ Bucaspor (loan)	8	(0)
2012–2013	Karşıyaka	11	(0)
2013	Bugsaşspor	8	(0)
2014	Tokatspor	13	(4)
2014–2015	Batman Petrolspor	5	(0)
2015–2016	Darıca Gençlerbirliği	17	(5)
2015–2016	Diyarbakırspor	19	(7)
2016–2017	İnegölspor	10	(0)
2017	Karacabey Birlikspor	0	(0)
2017	Van BB	12	(2)
2017–2018	Osmaniyespor FK	12	(1)
2018–	Orhangazispor	2	(0)

International career
2004	Turkey U18	15	(3)
- * Club domestic league appearances and goals as of 5 February 2018

Emre Aktaş (born 23 September 1986) is a Turkish professional footballer who plays as a forward for Orhangazispor.
