= Mert Erdoğan =

Turkish footballer

Personal information
- Full name: Mert Erdoğan
- Date of birth: March 1, 1989 (age 37)
- Place of birth: Ereğli, Konya, Turkey
- Height: 1.74 m (5 ft 8 1/2 in)
- Position: Central midfielder

Team information
- Current team: Tavşanlı Linyitspor
- Number: 18

Youth career
- Ankaragücü

Senior career*
Years	Team	Apps	(Gls)
2004–2014	Ankaragücü	?	(?)
2010	→ Bugsaş Spor (loan)	3	(0)
2010–2011	→ Türk Telekomspor (loan)	3	(0)
2011	→ Denizli Belediyespor (loan)	11	(0)
2014–2015	1461 Trabzon	14	(1)
2015	Fatih Karagümrük	1	(0)
2015–2016	Çine Madranspor	17	(0)
2016–	Tavşanlı Linyitspor	7	(1)
- * Club domestic league appearances and goals

Mert Erdoğan (born 1 March 1989) is a Turkish footballer. He currently plays for Tavşanlı Linyitspor in Turkey.
