= Augustine Ahinful =

Ghanaian footballer (born 1974)

Personal information
- Date of birth: 30 November 1974 (age 51)
- Place of birth: Accra, Ghana
- Height: 5 ft 9 in (1.75 m)
- Position: Second striker

Youth career
- –1991: Assin Fosu Soccer Missionaries
- 1991–1993: Goldfields Obuasi

Senior career*
Years	Team	Apps	(Gls)
1990–1991	Assin Fosu Soccer Missionaries		
1991–1993	Goldfields Obuasi		(12)
1993–1994	Borussia Dortmund	0	(0)
1993–1994	→ Borussia Dortmund II (loan)	3	(0)
1994–1998	Grasshoppers	41	(2)
1994–1996	→ SC Kriens (loan)	62	(24)
1998–1999	União de Leiria		(6)
1998	→ Venezia (loan)	10	(0)
1999–2000	Boavista	10	(1)
2000–2003	Ankaragücü	80	(42)
2003–2005	Trabzonspor	27	(1)
2005–2008	Ankaragücü	23	(2)
Total		264	(90)

International career
1994–2003	Ghana	20	(5)
- * Club domestic league appearances and goals

Augustine Ahinful (born 30 November 1974) is a Ghanaian former professional footballer who played as a second striker, notably for Ankaragücü in the Süper Lig. He is a Product of Ghana Secondary Technical School(Takoradi).

== Club career ==
Ahinful was born in Accra. He was the Ghana Premier League topscorer on 1992–93 season with Goldfield Obuasi. He played for Borussia Dortmund in Germany, Grasshoppers in Switzerland, União de Leiria and Boavista in Portugal, Venezia in Italy, Ankaragücü and Trabzonspor in Turkey.

== International career ==
Ahinful made several appearance for the Ghana national team. He participated in the 1993 FIFA World Youth Championship, 1996 Summer Olympics and in the 2000 African Cup of Nations.

In 2013 , he claimed that he had refused an approach to play for Ghana at the 2006 FIFA World Cup, the first time the nation had qualified, after being asked to pay a bribe.

== Honours ==
=== Club ===
Trabzonspor

- Turkish Cup: 2003–04
