= Özgür Yasar =

Swedish footballer

Özgür Yaşar
Personal information
- Date of birth: 26 November 1981 (age 44)
- Place of birth: Gothenburg, Sweden
- Height: 1.86 m (6 ft 1 in)
- Position: Forward

Youth career
- Norsborg IF

Senior career*
Years	Team	Apps	(Gls)
2000–2003	Spårvägens FF	84	(38)
2004	Café Opera United	18	(1)
2005–2006	Väsby United	54	(6)
2007–2008	Syrianska FC	38	(10)
2009–2011	Vasalunds IF	45	(11)
2011–2012	Konyaspor KIF	20	(12)
2012	Syrianska FC	6	(1)
- * Club domestic league appearances and goals

Özgür Yaşar (born 26 November 1981) is a Swedish footballer who plays as a forward.
