= İbrahim Dağaşan =

Turkish footballer (born 1984)

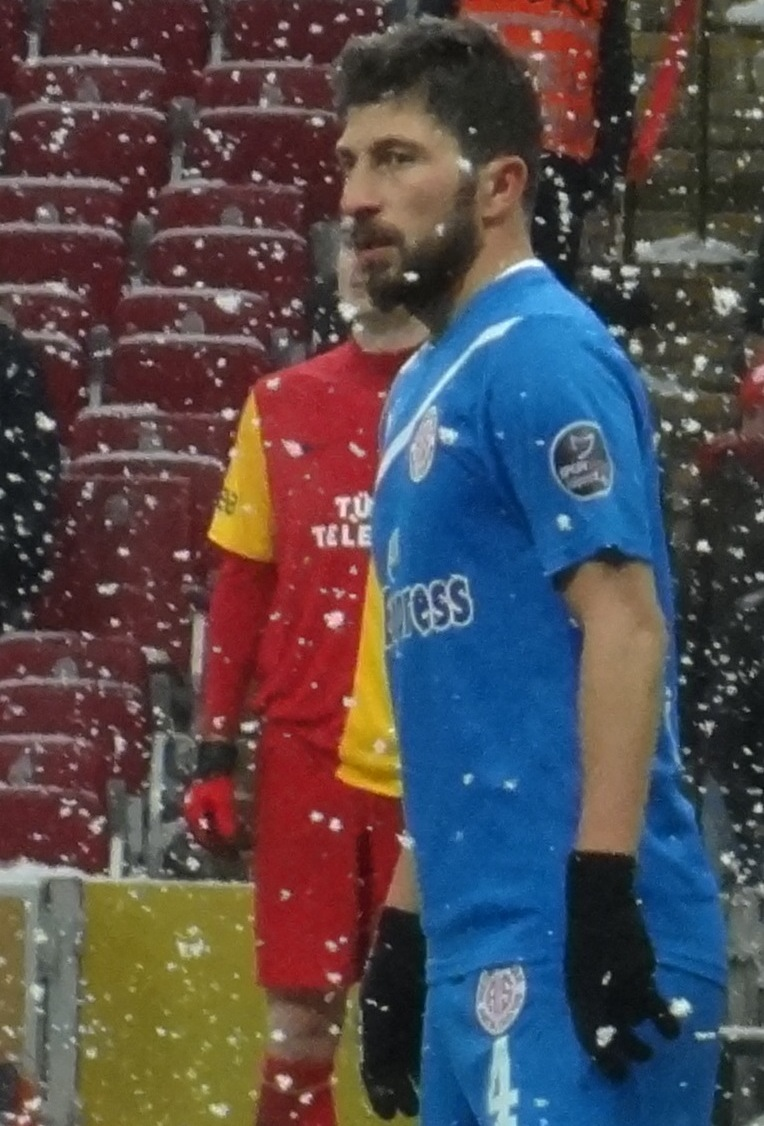
- Dağaşan playing for Antalyaspor in 2012

Personal information
- Full name: İbrahim Dağaşan
- Date of birth: 15 June 1984 (age 42)
- Place of birth: Angers, France
- Height: 1.80 m (5 ft 11 in)
- Position: Midfielder

Senior career*
Years	Team	Apps	(Gls)
2001–2004	İnegölspor	67	(0)
2004–2008	Bursaspor	79	(1)
2008–2010	Sivasspor	54	(1)
2010	Bucaspor	15	(0)
2011–2014	Antalyaspor	85	(1)
2014–2015	Kayserispor	31	(1)
2016	Adana Demirspor	12	(0)
2016–2017	Menemen Belediyespor	14	(0)
2017–2018	Kemerspor	29	(7)
Total		386	(11)

International career
2004	Turkey U19	1	(0)
2005	Turkey Olympic	4	(0)
2006	Turkey U21	5	(0)

Managerial career
- 2023–: Ümraniyespor (sporting director)
- * Club domestic league appearances and goals

İbrahim Dağaşan (born 15 June 1984) is a Turkish former professional footballer who played as a midfielder.

== Career ==
He left Kayserispor in the winter of 2015.

In 2023, he was appointed as sporting director of TFF First League club Ümraniyespor.
