= Leyla Ozgur Alhassen =

Quranic studies scholar

Leyla Ozgur Alhassen is a Quranic studies scholar. She is Visiting Scholar in the Department of Near Eastern Studies, University of California, Berkeley.

== Biography ==
Alhassen received her PhD from the Department of Near Eastern Languages and Cultures at the University of California, Los Angeles in 2011, with emphasis on Arabic literature.

== Works ==
- How the Qur'ān Works: Reading Sacred Narrative (2023)
- Qur’ānic Stories: God, Revelation and the Audience (2021)

== See also ==
- Isra Yazicioglu
