= Emre Toraman =

Turkish football player (born 1979)

Personal information
- Date of birth: 5 January 1979 (age 47)
- Place of birth: Samsun, Turkey
- Height: 1.79 m (5 ft 10 in)
- Position: Defensive midfielder

Youth career
- 1999–2000: Gençlerbirliği

Senior career*
Years	Team	Apps	(Gls)
2000–2002	Gençlerbirliği	0	(0)
2001	→ Hacettepe S.K. (loan)	14	(1)
2002	→ Marmaris Belediyespor (loan)	41	(2)
2002–2003	Yimpaş Yozgatspor	29	(3)
2003–2004	Trabzonspor	11	(1)
2004–2005	Sakaryaspor	24	(7)
2005–2007	Kayseri Erciyesspor	56	(1)
2007	Çaykur Rizespor	8	(0)
2008–2009	Eskişehirspor	36	(3)
2009–2010	Kasımpaşa	26	(1)
2010–2011	Konyaspor	15	(1)
2011	Kayseri Erciyesspor	13	(3)
2011–2012	Boluspor	22	(1)
2012	Adanaspor	6	(0)
2013	Karşıyaka	14	(0)
2013	Turgutluspor	10	(0)
2014	Eyüpspor	10	(0)
2014–2015	Yeni Malatyaspor	27	(2)
2015–2016	Kayseri Erciyesspor	28	(1)
2016–2018	Bucaspor	24	(0)

International career
2006	Turkey	1	(0)
- * Club domestic league appearances and goals

Emre Toraman (born 5 January 1979) is a retired Turkish football player.

== Career ==
On 31 August 2016, he joined Bucaspor on a one-year contract.

== Honours ==
=== Club ===
Trabzonspor

- Turkish Cup: 2003–04
