= Özgür Kart =

Turkish footballer

Personal information
- Date of birth: 18 April 1982 (age 44)
- Place of birth: Trostberg, West Germany
- Height: 1.79 m (5 ft 10 in)
- Position: Striker

Team information
- Current team: SV Wacker Burghausen II

Youth career
- 1990–1998: TSV Trostberg
- 1998–2000: SV Wacker Burghausen

Senior career*
Years	Team	Apps	(Gls)
2000–2005	SV Wacker Burghausen II		
2005–2007	SV Wacker Burghausen	3	(0)
2006	→ Hamburger SV II (loan)	6	(0)
2007–2008	SSV Jahn Regensburg	28	(3)
2008–2009	Kasımpaşa S.K.	1	(0)
2009	→ Gaziosmanpaşa (loan)	13	(2)
2009–2012	TSV Ampfing		
2012–2013	SV Wacker Burghausen II		
2013–2014	TSV Ampfing		
2014–2016	TSV Dorfen		
2016–2017	FA Trostberg		
2017–2019	SV Kirchanschöring	34	(6)
2019	SB Chiemgau Traunstein		
- * Club domestic league appearances and goals

Özgür Kart (born 18 April 1982) is a Turkish former footballer.

Kart previously played for SV Wacker Burghausen in the German 2. Fußball-Bundesliga and Kasımpaşa S.K. in the TFF First League.

Kart transferred to TSV Ampfing in August 2009.
