= Özgür İleri =

Turkish footballer (born 1987)

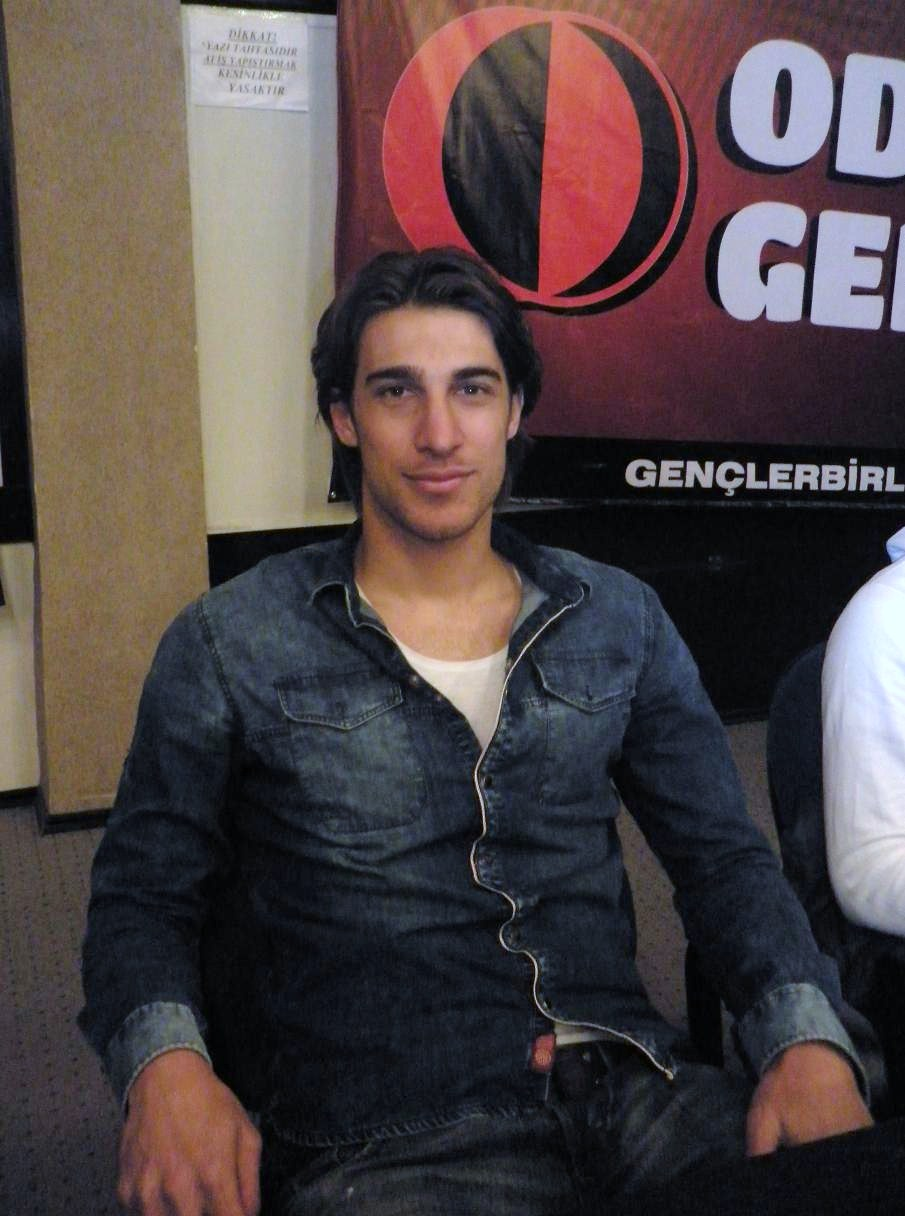

Personal information
- Date of birth: 17 November 1987 (age 38)
- Place of birth: İzmir, Turkey
- Height: 1.88 m (6 ft 2 in)
- Positions: Defensive midfielder; centre back

Team information
- Current team: Pendikspor

Youth career
- 2001–2003: Metaspor
- 2003–2006: Dardanelspor

Senior career*
Years	Team	Apps	(Gls)
2006–2011	Dardanelspor	124	(3)
2011–2015	Gençlerbirliği	72	(3)
2015–2016	Göztepe	18	(1)
2016–2018	Boluspor	50	(0)
2018–2019	BB Bodrumspor	26	(1)
2019–2020	Kastamonuspor 1966	25	(3)
2020–	Pendikspor	0	(0)
- * Club domestic league appearances and goals as of 20 July 2020

Özgür İleri (born 17 November 1987 in İzmir, Turkey) is a Turkish professional footballer who plays as a midfielder for Pendikspor.

== Career ==
İleri began his career at the Metaspor football school in 2001. He was transferred to Dardanelspor in 2003, where he has played since.

İleri is also a youth international.
