= Özgür Varlık =

Turkish sport shooter (born 1979)

Özgür Varlık (born 6 February 1979) is a Turkish sport shooter competing in the 25 meter rapid fire pistol events. Verlik obtained a quota for participation at the 2020 Summer Olympics after the 2019 European Games held in Minsk, Belarus.
