= Serkan Bekiroğlu =

Turkish footballer

Personal information
- Full name: Serkan Bekiroğlu
- Date of birth: January 26, 1979 (age 47)
- Place of birth: Kadirli, Turkey
- Position: Centreback

Youth career
- 1993–1999: Adanaspor

Senior career*
Years	Team	Apps	(Gls)
1999–2004	Adanaspor	98	(2)
2002–2003	→ Kocaelispor (loan)	1	(0)
2004–2005	Kayserispor	7	(0)
2005–2006	Antalyaspor	6	(0)
2006–2008	Karşıyaka	34	(1)
2008–2009	Adana Demirspor	6	(1)
2010	Giresunspor	0	(0)

International career
2000	Turkey U21	1	(0)
- * Club domestic league appearances and goals as of 1 March 2009

Serkan Bekiroğlu (born 26 January 1979) is a Turkish retired professional footballer who played as a centreback, most notably for the Turkish club Adanaspor in the Süper Lig.

== Professional career ==
A youth product of Adanaspor, Bekiroğlu made his professional debut in a 4-1 Turkish Cup loss to Galatasaray on 23 January 1999. He made his Süper Lig debut in a 1–1 tie with Bursaspor on 23 May 1999.

== International career ==
Bekiroğlu made one appearance for the Turkey U21s in a 2-2 friendly match against the Israel U21s on 5 April 2000.

== Personal life ==
Bekiroğlu's brother, Volkan Kürşat Bekiroğlu, was also a professional footballer in Turkey.
