= Hasan Sönmez =

Turkish footballer

Personal information
- Full name: Hasan Sönmez
- Date of birth: September 27, 1976 (age 50)
- Place of birth: İznik, Bursa, Turkey
- Position: Goalkeeper

Youth career
- –1994: Iznikspor

Senior career*
Years	Team	Apps	(Gls)
1994–1995	Iznikspor	23	(0)
1995–2003	Gençlerbirliği	61	(0)
2003–2007	Trabzonspor	18	(0)
2006	→ Akçaabat Sebatspor (loan)	13	(0)
2006–2007	→ Kayserispor (loan)	1	(0)
2007–2008	Kayserispor	5	(0)
2008–2009	Samsunspor	30	(0)
2009–2010	Antalyaspor	0	(0)
2011–2012	Iznikspor	21	(0)

International career^{‡}
1994–1995	Turkey U18	2	(0)
- * Club domestic league appearances and goals as of 14:25, 8 May 2016 (UTC) ‡ National team caps and goals as of 14:25, 8 May 2016 (UTC)

Hasan Sönmez (born September 27, 1976 in İznik, Bursa, Turkey) is a retired Turkish footballer. He played for seven different clubs throughout his career, including Gençlerbirliği, Trabzonspor and Kayserispor. He finished his career with Iznikspor in 2011–12, the same team he started his career with in 1994.

== Career ==
Hasan Sönmez spent his youth career with Iznikspor, he made his career debut on 17 September 1994 in a 2–1 away defeat against Beylerbeyi. He made 23 appearances in the 1994–95 TFF Third League season for Iznikspor before departing in 1995 to sign his first professional contract with Gençlerbirliği. He made his Gençlerbirliği debut in a 5–2 away defeat to Nazilli Belediyespor in the Turkish Cup. He remained with the club until 2003 when he left to join Trabzonspor, with whom he appeared in 18 league matches. During his time with Trabzonspor, he was a part of the club's 2003–04 Turkish Cup winning side.

His spell with Trabzonspor included two loan spells, the first to Akçaabat Sebatspor (13 apps in all competitions) and the second to Kayserispor (3 apps in all competitions). The latter became Sönmez's fourth permanent career club as he joined Kayserispor permanently ahead of the 2007–08 season. He made 10 appearances over two competitions for the team before leaving at the end of the season to sign for Samsunspor, his parting gift from Kayserispor was the 2007–08 Turkish Cup which him and the club won in a final against Sönmez's old club, Gençlerbirliği.

His move to Samsunspor saw the return of regular first-team football as he played 31 times overall for Samsunspor during 2008–09, despite this Sönmez was on the move again in September 2009 when he agreed to join Antalyaspor. After not making a single appearance for the club in any competition, he left Antalyaspor a year later. After being a free agent between July 2010 and February 2011, Sönmez got back into football and returned to his first club Iznikspor. He participated in 22 Turkish Regional Amateur League matches for the team before retiring in 2012.

== Career statistics ==
As of 8 May 2016.

Statistics
Club	Season	League			National Cup (Note: Includes the Turkish Cup)		League Cup		Continental		Other (Note: Includes the Turkish Regional Amateur League play-offs)		Total	
Club	Season	Division	Apps	Goals	Apps	Goals	Apps	Goals	Apps	Goals	Apps	Goals	Apps	Goals
Iznikspor	1994–95	Third League	23	0	0	0	—		—		—		23	0
Iznikspor	Total		23	0	0	0	—		—		—		23	0
Gençlerbirliği	1995–96	Süper Lig	3	0	0	0	—		0	0	—		3	0
Gençlerbirliği	1996–97	Süper Lig	5	0	1 (Note: 1 appearance in 1996–97 Turkish Cup)	0	—		—		—		6	0
Gençlerbirliği	1997–98	Süper Lig	20	0	1 (Note: 1 appearance in 1997–98 Turkish Cup)	0	—		—		—		21	0
Gençlerbirliği	1998–99	Süper Lig	4	0	0	0	—		—		—		4	0
Gençlerbirliği	1999–00	Süper Lig	20	0	1 (Note: 1 appearance in 1999–00 Turkish Cup)	0	—		—		—		21	0
Gençlerbirliği	2000–01	Süper Lig	3	0	1 (Note: 1 appearance in 2000–01 Turkish Cup)	0	—		—		—		4	0
Gençlerbirliği	2001–02	Süper Lig	5	0	0	0	—		0	0	—		5	0
Gençlerbirliği	2002–03	Süper Lig	1	0	1 (Note: 1 appearance in 2002–03 Turkish Cup)	0	—		—		—		2	0
Gençlerbirliği	Total		61	0	5	0	—		0	0	—		66	0
Trabzonspor	2003–04	Süper Lig	7	0	0	0	—		0	0	—		7	0
Trabzonspor	2004–05	Süper Lig	10	0	1 (Note: 1 appearance in 2004–05 Turkish Cup)	0	—		0	0	—		11	0
Trabzonspor	2005–06	Süper Lig	1	0	0	0	—		0	0	—		1	0
Trabzonspor	2006–07	Süper Lig	0	0	0	0	—		0	0	—		0	0
Trabzonspor	Total		18	0	1	0	—		0	0	—		19	0
Akçaabat Sebatspor (loan)	2005–06	First League	13	0	0	0	—		—		—		13	0
Akçaabat Sebatspor (loan)	Total		13	0	0	0	—		—		—		13	0
Kayserispor	2006–07 (loan)	Süper Lig	1	0	2 (Note: 2 appearances in 2006–07 Turkish Cup)	0	—		0	0	—		3	0
Kayserispor	2007–08	Süper Lig	5	0	5 (Note: 5 appearances in 2007–08 Turkish Cup)	0	—		—		—		10	0
Kayserispor	Total		6	0	7	0	—		0	0	—		13	0
Samsunspor	2008–09	First League	30	0	1 (Note: 1 appearance in 2008–09 Turkish Cup)	0	—		—		—		31	0
Samsunspor	Total		30	0	1	0	—		—		—		31	0
Antalyaspor	2009–10	First League	0	0	0	0	—		—		—		0	0
Antalyaspor	Total		0	0	0	0	—		—		—		0	0
Iznikspor	2011–12	Amateur League	21	0	0	0	—		—		1 (Note: 1 appearance in 2011–12 Turkish Regional Amateur League play-offs)	0	22	0
Iznikspor	Total		21	0	0	0	—		—		1	0	22	0
Career total			172	0	14	0	—		—		1	0	187	0

== Honours ==
Gençlerbirliği

- Turkish Cup (1): 2001

Trabzonspor

- Turkish Cup (1): 2003–04

Kayserispor

- Turkish Cup (1): 2007–08
