= Özgür Demirtaş =

Turkish economist (born 1976)

Prof. Dr. Özgür Demirtaş
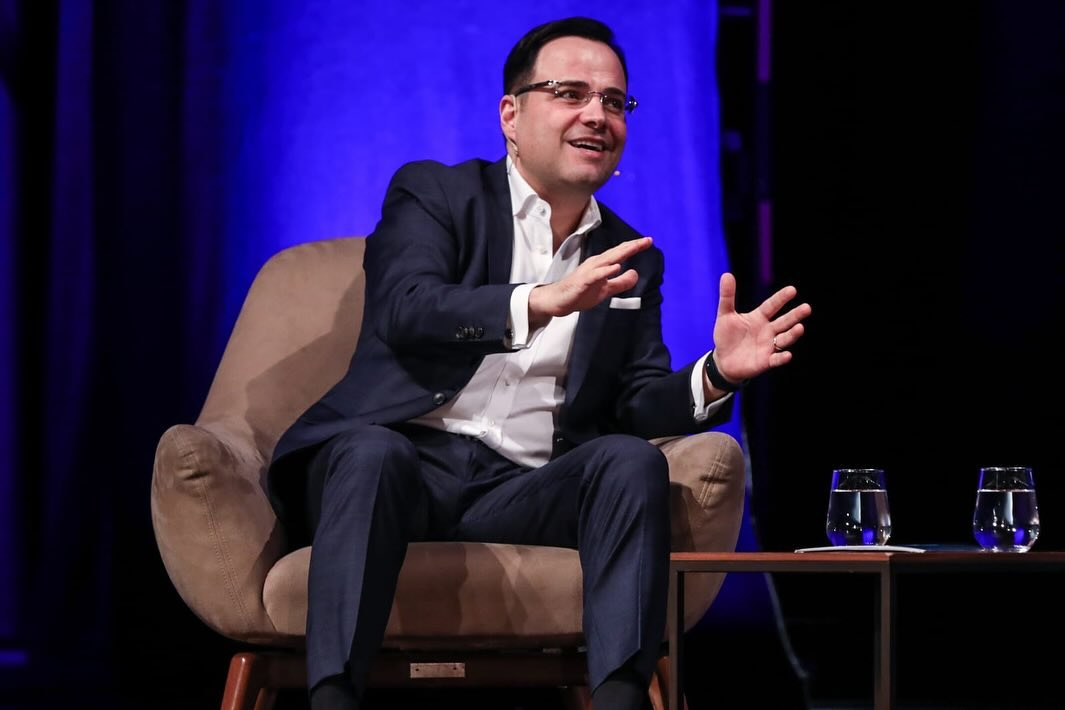
- Born: Kemal Özgür Demirtaş; August 12, 1975 (age 50); Ankara, Turkey
- Occupation: Professor of Finance

Academic background
- Education: Boğaziçi University (B.S.); Boston College (PhD)

Academic work
- Discipline: Economist
- Sub-discipline: Financial economics Asset pricing

Kemal Özgür Demirtaş (born August 12, 1975, Ankara) is a Turkish Finance Professor.

== Biography ==
Demirtas graduated from the Department of Electrical and Electronics Engineering at Boğaziçi University in 1998. He received his Ph.D. degree in finance from Boston College in 2003.

=== Academic career ===
He began his career at Baruch College, City University of New York (CUNY), as a tenure track Assistant Professor in 2003. He was tenured and promoted to Associate Professor at Baruch (CUNY) in 2007. He joined Sabancı University in 2012. Demirtas was appointed as the Founding Chairman of Center of Excellence in Finance (CEF) in 2014.

=== Publications ===
He published papers in Management Science, Journal of Financial Economics Journal of Monetary Economics, Journal of Financial and Quantitative Analysis, The Review of Financial Studies, and Journal of Business & Economic Statistics. His book on private equity funds was published by Academic Press. He co-authored a short book entitled Investing in hedge funds: a guide to measuring risk and return characteristics.

=== Professional Activity ===
He consulted Natural Disaster Insurance Institution. He was appointed as the Founding Chairman of the Center of Excellence in Finance established at Sabanci University. He served as a board member in Akbank, Turkey for three terms until 2023. He is a founding board member at FODER, Turkey's first financial literacy association.

=== Personal ===
He is married to Neslihan Küçükoğlu Demirtaş and they have one child.
