= Erdinç Yavuz =

Turkish footballer

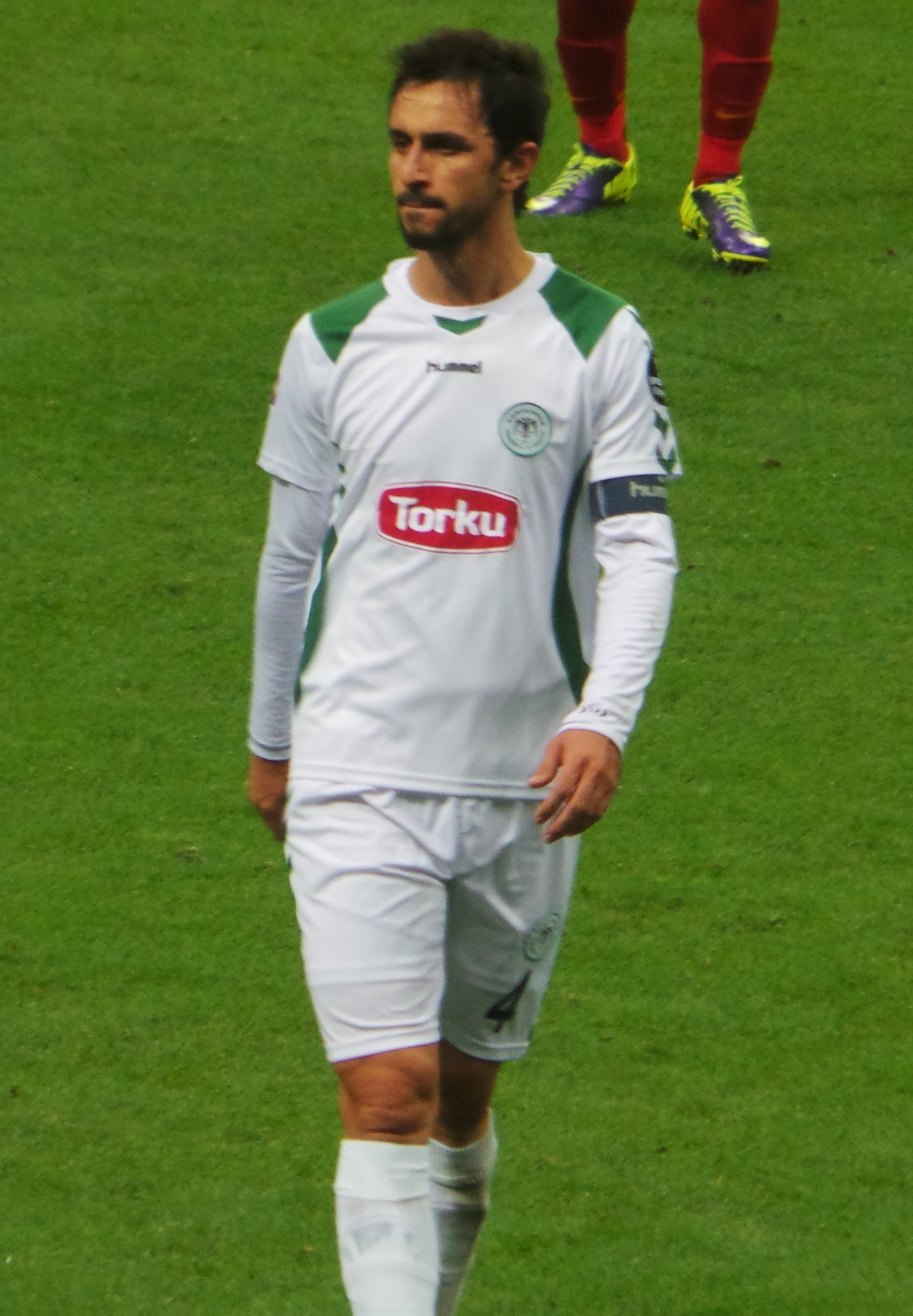

Personal information
- Date of birth: 4 October 1978 (age 48)
- Place of birth: Kayseri, Turkey
- Height: 1.87 m (6 ft 2 in)
- Position: Defender

Youth career
- Kayseri Erciyesspor

Senior career*
Years	Team	Apps	(Gls)
1997–1998	Kayseri Erciyesspor		
1998–1999	Hatayspor	29	(1)
1999–2002	Kayseri Erciyesspor		
2002–2008	Trabzonspor	128	(8)
2006–2007	→ Sakaryaspor (loan)	10	(0)
2009	Kayseri Erciyesspor	14	(1)
2009–2010	Diyarbakirspor	17	(1)
2010–2014	Konyaspor	84	(5)
2014–2015	Elazığspor	3	(1)
- * Club domestic league appearances and goals

Erdinç Yavuz (born 4 October 1978) is a former Turkish footballer who played as a central defender.

== Club career ==
Yavuz played for Kayserispor, Trabzonspor and Sakaryaspor in the Turkish Super Lig. He was recognized for his ability to score headers from corners. He has been called up for the Turkey national football team, but has not made an appearance for the senior side.

== Honours ==
=== Club ===
Trabzonspor

- Turkish Cup: 2002–03, 2003–04
