= Ali Güneş =

Turkish former professional footballer (born 1978)

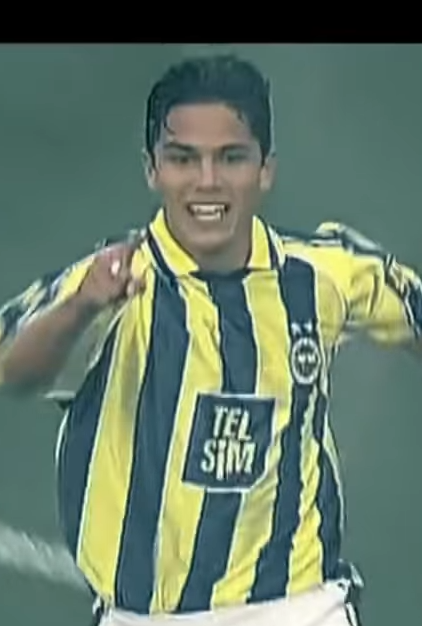
- Güneş in 2001

Personal information
- Full name: Ali Mehmet Güneş
- Date of birth: 23 November 1978 (age 47)
- Place of birth: Donaueschingen, West Germany
- Height: 1.76 m (5 ft 9 in)
- Position: Midfielder

Youth career
- TuS Bräunlingen
- FV Donaueschingen
- –1996: FC 08 Villingen

Senior career*
Years	Team	Apps	(Gls)
1997–2000	SC Freiburg	58	(8)
2000–2004	Fenerbahçe	91	(5)
2004–2007	Beşiktaş	53	(3)
2007–2009	SC Freiburg	26	(4)
2009–2010	Kasımpaşa	16	(0)
2010–2011	Bucaspor	2	(0)
Total		246	(20)

International career
1998–2000	Turkey U21	9	(0)
2002–2003	Turkey A2	3	(0)
2004	Turkey	1	(0)
- * Club domestic league appearances and goals

Ali Mehmet Güneş (born 23 November 1978) is a former professional footballer who played as a midfielder. Born in West Germany, he represented Turkey at international level.

== Club career ==
Güneş was born in Donaueschingen, West Germany. He started his career with SC Freiburg in 1997 and in 2002 he was signed by Turkish club Fenerbahçe where he stayed until 2004. The defender was then signed on by rivals Beşiktaş, but returned to his first club SC Freiburg in 2007 where he was released from on 15 June 2009. On 13 July 2009, he signed with Kasımpaşa.

== International career ==
Güneş has one cap for Turkey.
