= Korhan Öztürk =

Turkish footballer

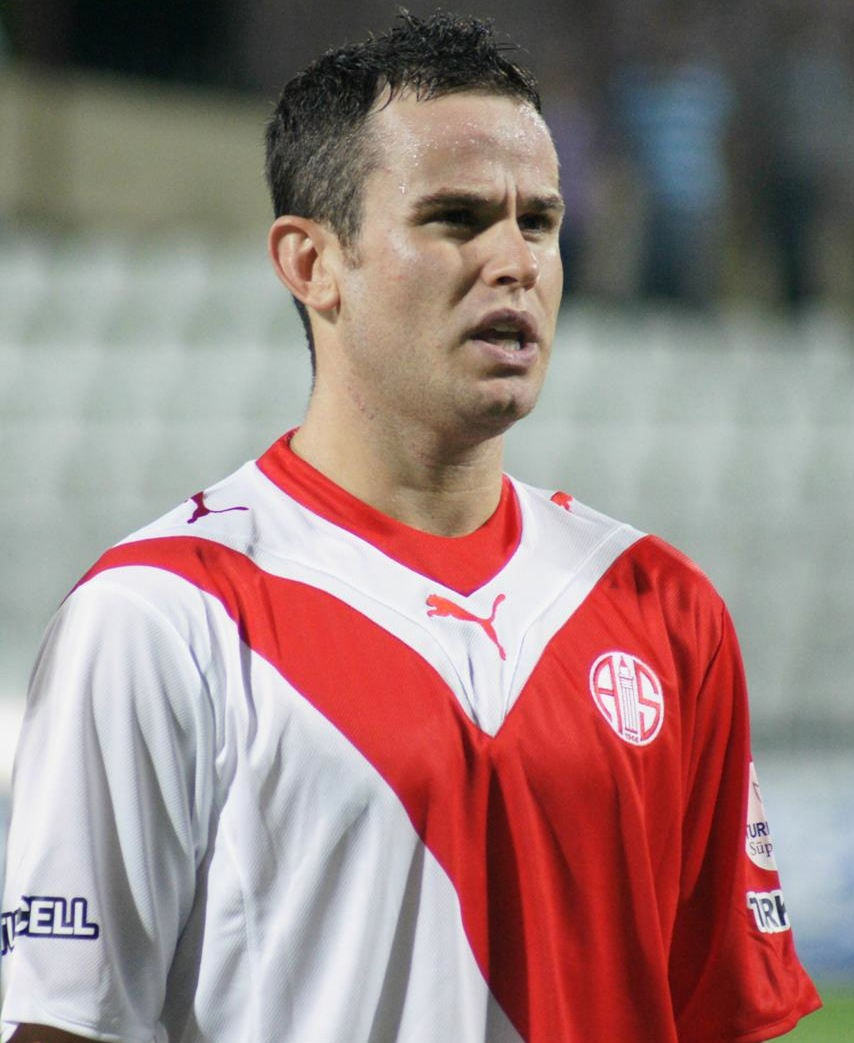

Personal information
- Date of birth: 28 June 1981 (age 45)
- Place of birth: Bornova, Turkey
- Height: 1.74 m (5 ft 9 in)
- Position: Midfielder

Senior career*
Years	Team	Apps	(Gls)
2002–2004	Gençlerbirliği		
2003–2004	→ A. Sebatspor (loan)		
2004–2005	Karşıyaka		
2005–2008	Elazığspor		
2008–2010	Antalyaspor	52	(3)
2010–2011	Kasımpaşa		
2011–2012	Göztepe		
2013	Altay		
2014	Çankırıspor		
2014	Tokatspor		
2015	Tarsus İdman Yurdu		
2015–2016	Sökespor		
- * Club domestic league appearances and goals

Korhan Öztürk (born 28 June 1982) is a Turkish former football midfielder.
