= Özgür Ceylan =

Turkish businessperson and politician (born 1973)

- Incumbent
- Assumed office 24 June 2018
- Constituency: Çanakkale

Personal details
- Born: 27 November 1973 (age 52) Çıldır, Ardahan, Turkey
- Party: New Party (since 2026)
- Education: Anadolu University; Selçuk University

Özgür Ceylan (born 27 November 1973) is a Turkish businessperson and politician. After working as a businessman, he entered politics, and became a member of the parliament. He was a member of the Republican People's Party before he transferred to the New Party.

== Business career ==
Ceylan is a Certified Public Accountant, who worked as a businessperson. Between 1997 and 2007, he managed a construction materials market owned by him and his family. In 2007, he entered in a business career in the construction sector.

== Politician career ==
Ceylan entered politics joining the Republican People's Party (CHP). From 2012 onwards, he served as the CHP Biga District Vice Chairman, District Secretary, and for two terms as the District Chairman. He published a book titled "Foreign Policy and Erdal İnönü". At the 2018 Turkish general election on 24 June, he was elected as a Deputy of Çanakkale to the Grand National Assembly of Turkey. He was elected as a member of the 38th Ordinary Congress held in 2023.

=== New Party ===
In July 2026, he transferred to the New Party (YP) following its establishment. He was elected to the ten-seat Central Executive Board, and was appointed Vice Chairman in charge of Administrative and Financial Affairs.

== Personal life ==
Ceylan was born to Ayfer and Ali İhsan in Yenice, Çanakkale, Turkey on 27 November 1973.

He graduated from the Department of Business Administration at the Faculty of Economics and Administrative Sciences of Anadolu University in Eskişehir. He completed a master's degree in Political Science and International Relations at the Institute of Social Sciences of Selçuk University in Konya.

He is married and has a child.
