= Uğur Demirkol =

Turkish footballer (born 1990)

Personal information
- Full name: Uğur Demirkol
- Date of birth: 16 January 1990 (age 36)
- Place of birth: Berlin, Germany
- Height: 1.83 m (6 ft 0 in)
- Positions: Left back; centre back

Youth career
- 200?–2006: Hertha BSC
- 2007–2009: Ankaraspor
- 2010: Ankaragücü

Senior career*
Years	Team	Apps	(Gls)
2007–2009	Ankaraspor	18	(0)
2010–2011	MKE Ankaragücü	0	(0)
2011	SC Freiburg II	3	(0)
2011–2012	Waldhof Mannheim	11	(0)
2012–2013	1. FC Union Berlin II	22	(0)
2013–2015	Kayseri Erciyesspor	1	(0)
2014	→ Şanlıurfaspor (loan)	13	(0)

International career
2006–2007	Turkey U16		
2006–2007	Turkey U17		
2007–2008	Turkey U18		
2008–2009	Turkey U19		
- * Club domestic league appearances and goals as of 11 August 2015

Uğur Demirkol (born 16 January 1990) is a Turkish professional footballer. He plays as a left fullback.
