= Reyhan Özgür =

Turkish diplomat (born 1978)

Reyhan Özgür (born 1978) is a Turkish diplomat and the Consul General of Turkey to New York since August 15, 2020.

== Background ==
Özgür was born in Kırcaali, Bulgaria. He graduated from METU, Department of Political Science and Public Administration in 2003. He joined the Ministry of Foreign Affairs in 2004 and worked on NATO, Euro-Atlantic Security and Defence Affairs as the Deputy Director General and then he became the Chief of Cabinet to the Deputy Foreign Minister. He also served in Baghdad and Brussels.
