= Emrah Eren =

Turkish footballer (born 1978)

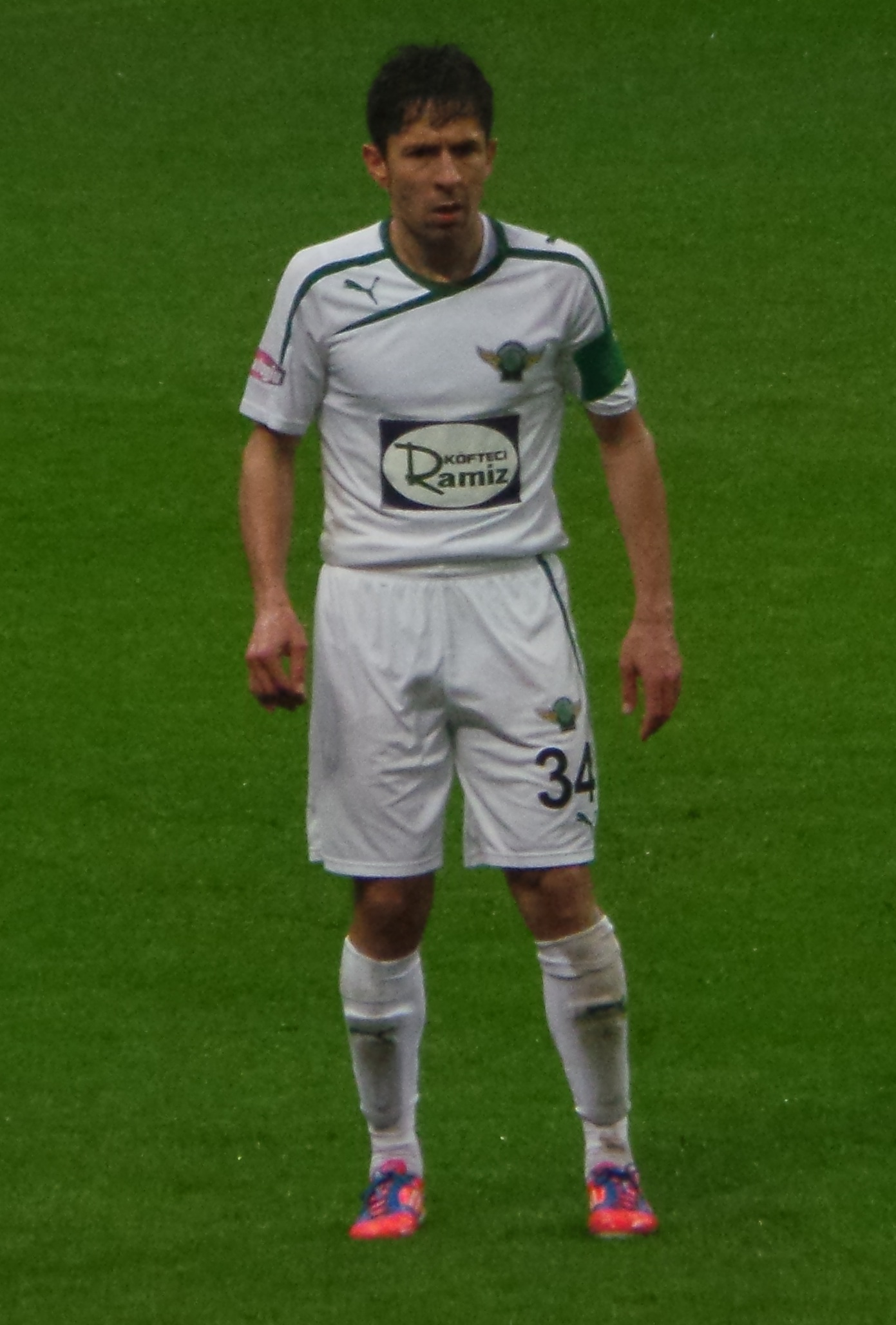
- Emrah Eren in 2014

Personal information
- Date of birth: 13 November 1978 (age 47)
- Place of birth: Istanbul, Turkey
- Height: 1.75 m (5 ft 9 in)
- Position: Right back

Youth career
- 1990–1993: Gaziosmanpaşaspor
- 1993–1995: İstanbulspor

Senior career*
| Years | Team | Apps | (Gls) |
| 1995–1996 | İstanbulspor | | |
| 1995–1996 | → Kartalspor (loan) | | |
| 1996–1999 | Adanaspor | 30 | (1) |
| 1999–2002 | Galatasaray | 10 | (0) |
| 2000–2001 | → İstanbulspor (loan) | 32 | (0) |
| 2001–2002 | → Gaziantepspor (loan) | 7 | (0) |
| 2002–2003 | Kocaelispor | 32 | (2) |
| 2003–2006 | Trabzonspor | 68 | (0) |
| 2006 | Malatyaspor | 17 | (0) |
| 2006–2008 | Çaykur Rizespor | 60 | (2) |
| 2008–2009 | Gaziantepspor | 8 | (0) |
| 2009–2010 | Giresunspor | 9 | (0) |
| 2010–2011 | Konyaspor | 2 | (0) |
| 2011 | Denizlispor | 12 | (0) |
| 2011–2014 | Akhisar Belediyespor | 92 | (4) |

International career
| 1997–2000 | Turkey U21 | | |
Medal record
Representing Turkey
Mediterranean Games
Men's Football
| Silver medal – second place | 1997 Bari | Team competition |
- * Club domestic league appearances and goals

Emrah Eren (born 13 November 1978) is a Turkish retired footballer.

Emrah has played over 250 matches at Turkish Super League and was a Turkey U21 international.

== Career ==
Emrah began his career at Gaziosmanpaşa in his teenage years, playing on the right side of defence and midfield. He became professional in İstanbulspor in 1995. He soon found himself at Süper Lig team Adanaspor, and immediately made his mark despite his youth. His talent earned him a place in the Turkish under-21 team, first at 1997 Mediterranean Games where he continued to impress the scouts from many teams. Displaying pace, power, technique and hard work it was obvious that he would soon join a big team.

In the summer of 1999, he joined Galatasaray. His time there was brief, as he failed to earn much playing time. He was loaned out to Istanbulspor for a while but found that his experience on his return to Galatasaray would be the same as he had been through before. At the beginning of the 2002 season he joined league strugglers Kocaelispor. Here he found regular playing time and refound his form and began to show signs of fulfilling his promise that he had displayed in his younger years. His efficient defending combined with runs into the opposition half made him one of the stars of the team. Kocaelispor were relegated from the Superlig. Emrah left to join the Black Sea club Trabzonspor.

At Trabzonspor, Emrah established himself as one of the best defenders in Turkish football. He is a fan favourite due to his modesty and hard work in the team. In July 2005 he extended his contract with the team for a further three years, to 2008.

In January 2006, he joined Malatyaspor.

Emrah Eren is married with one child.

In June 2010, Emrah Eren signed a one-year contract with Konyaspor.

== Honours ==
Galatasaray

- Süper Lig: 1999–2000
- Turkish Cup: 1999–2000
- UEFA Cup: 1999–2000

Trabzonspor

- Turkish Cup: 2003–04

Akhisar Belediyespor

- TFF First League: 2011–12
