= Koray İçten =

Turkish footballer

Personal information
- Full name: Koray İçten
- Date of birth: August 24, 1987 (age 39)
- Place of birth: İzmir, Turkey
- Position: Left back

Youth career
- 2000–2005: İzmirspor

Senior career*
Years	Team	Apps	(Gls)
2005–2007	İzmirspor	40	(0)
2007–2010	Konyaspor	10	(0)
2011–2012	Bucaspor	0	(0)

International career
2005	Turkey U18	2	(2)
2006	Turkey U20	1	(0)
- * Club domestic league appearances and goals

Koray İçten (born 24 August 1987) is a Turkish professional footballer who plays as a left back.
