= Emre Aygün =

Turkish footballer (born 1985)

Personal information
- Date of birth: 1 June 1985 (age 41)
- Place of birth: Trabzon, Turkey
- Height: 1.76 m (5 ft 9 1/2 in)
- Position: Forward

Youth career
- 2000–2003: Trabzonspor

Senior career*
Years	Team	Apps	(Gls)
2003–2004	Trabzonspor	4	(0)
2004–2005	Yimpaş Yozgatspor	27	(8)
2005–2009	Akçaabat Sebatspor	44	(14)
2007–2008	→ Orduspor (loan)	22	(3)
2009–2011	MKE Ankaragücü	10	(3)
2011–2012	Gençlerbirliği SK	7	(2)
2012–2013	Bugsaşspor	22	(9)
2013–2015	Orduspor	37	(7)
2015–2017	Göztepe SK	51	(5)
2017–2018	Bandırmaspor	9	(1)
2020	Yomraspor	2	(0)

International career
2002	Turkey U18	3	(1)
2002–2004	Turkey U19	18	(3)
- * Club domestic league appearances and goals as of 18 March 2020

Emre Aygün (born 1 June 1985) is a Turkish footballer who plays as a forward.

== Career ==
Born in Trabzon, Aygün started playing youth football for Trabzonspor and promoted to the professional team in January 2003. He would make only five league appearances for the club, and had loan spells with Yimpaş Yozgatspor and Akçaabat Sebatspor.

In January 2006, Aygün left Trabzonspor, and would spend the next few seasons playing in the second and third level of Turkish football. He joined MKE Ankaragücü for the 2009–10 Super Lig season, and scored three goals in ten league matches.
