= Ferhat Odabaşı =

Turkish footballer

Personal information
- Date of birth: 15 July 1983 (age 43)
- Place of birth: Divriği, Turkey
- Height: 1.85 m (6 ft 1 in)
- Position: Goalkeeper

Team information
- Current team: Altay (GK coach)

Youth career
- 1999–2001: Gençlerbirliği

Senior career*
Years	Team	Apps	(Gls)
2001–2008	Gençlerbirliği OFTAŞ	5	(0)
2006–2007	→ Hacettepe (loan)	5	(0)
2008	→ Eskişehirspor (loan)	0	(0)
2008–2009	Çaykur Rizespor	33	(0)
2010	Karabükspor	8	(0)
2010–2011	Boluspor	16	(0)
2011–2012	Kayseri Erciyesspor	25	(0)
2012–2013	Göztepe	24	(0)
2013–2014	Orduspor	5	(0)
2014–2015	Elazığspor	7	(0)
2015–2016	Ankaragücü	27	(0)
2016–2017	Hacettepe	5	(0)

International career
2000	Turkey U17	1	(0)
2001	Turkey U19	1	(0)

Managerial career
- 2022: Tuzlaspor (GK coach)
- 2022–: Altay (GK coach)
- * Club domestic league appearances and goals

Ferhat Odabaşı (born 15 July 1983) is a Turkish football coach and a former player. He is the goalkeeping coach with Altay.

== Club career ==
Odabaşı began the 2007–08 Süper Lig season with Gençlerbirliği OFTAŞ, but only made five league appearances for the club before moving to TFF First League side Eskişehirspor. He played for Çaykur Rizespor for the 2008–09 TFF First League season, prior to joining Karabükspor.
