= Özgür Yılmaz (footballer) =

Turkish footballer

Personal information
- Full name: Özgür Yılmaz
- Date of birth: March 7, 1986 (age 40)
- Place of birth: Üsküdar, Turkey
- Height: 1.95 m (6 ft 5 in)
- Position: Centre back

Team information
- Current team: Kastamonuspor
- Number: 57

Youth career
- 1999–2001: Yeni Özkartalspor
- 2001–2005: Öz Alibeyköy

Senior career*
Years	Team	Apps	(Gls)
2005–2008	Alibeyköyspor	40	(0)
2008–2013	Gaziosmanpaşaspor	124	(5)
2015–2018	Giresunspor	142	(5)
2018	Karabükspor	5	(0)
2018–2019	BB Bodrumspor	27	(1)
2019–	Kastamonuspor	18	(0)
- * Club domestic league appearances and goals ‡ National team caps and goals as of 01:01, 25 January 2020 (UTC)

Özgür Yılmaz (born 7 March 1986) is a Turkish professional footballer who plays as a defender for Kastamonuspor.

== Professional career ==
Beginning his career as an amateur footballer, Özgür worked his way up becoming a stalwart at Gaziosmanpaşaspor, and then became captain of Giresunspor in the second division of Turkey. Özgür signed his first professional contract with Kardemir Karabükspor on 31 January 2018, for 1.5 years. Özgür made his professional debut with Kardemir Karabükspor in a 3-1 Süper Lig loss to Yeni Malatyaspor on 25 February 2018, at the age of 30.
