= Özgür Öçal =

Turkish footballer

Personal information
- Full name: Özgür Öçal
- Date of birth: 5 October 1981 (age 45)
- Place of birth: Istanbul, Turkey
- Height: 1.76 m (5 ft 9 in)
- Positions: Right back; right winger

Youth career
- 1999–2000: Galatasaray

Senior career*
Years	Team	Apps	(Gls)
2000–2004	Bakırköyspor	134	(6)
2004–2008	Kasımpaşa	113	(1)
2008–2010	Eskişehirspor	13	(1)
2009–2010	→ Kasımpaşa (loan)	17	(2)
2010–2012	Kasımpaşa	10	(1)
2012–2014	Adana Demirspor	57	(3)
2014–2015	Gaziantep BB	5	(0)
2015	Alanyaspor	11	(1)
2015–2016	Adanaspor	3	(0)
- * Club domestic league appearances and goals as of 26 June 2016

Özgür Öçal (born 5 October 1981) is a Turkish professional footballer who last played as a midfielder for Adanaspor.
