= İsmail Özgür Göktaş =

Turkish footballer

Personal information
- Full name: İsmail Özgür Göktaş
- Date of birth: 23 April 1989 (age 37)
- Place of birth: Bursa, Turkey
- Height: 1.70 m (5 ft 7 in)
- Positions: Midfielder; right winger

Team information
- Current team: Tarsus Idman Yurdu

Youth career
- 2003–2008: Bursaspor

Senior career*
Years	Team	Apps	(Gls)
2008–2012	Bursaspor	12	(0)
2009	→ Kasımpaşa (loan)	5	(0)
2009–2010	→ Tarsus Idman Yurdu (loan)	33	(7)
2010–2011	→ Güngören Belediyespor (loan)	21	(0)
2012–	Tarsus Idman Yurdu		
- * Club domestic league appearances and goals as of 15:28, 20 April 2009 (UTC)

İsmail Özgür Göktaş (born 23 April 1989) is a Turkish footballer who plays for Tarsus Idman Yurdu. He is one of the young players of Bursaspor whom coach Samet Aybaba trusted and gave the opportunity to play 2007–2008 season. He's regarded as a promising right winger. Göktaş loan in Kasımpaşa.
