= Mehmet Yılmaz (footballer, born 1979) =

Turkish footballer

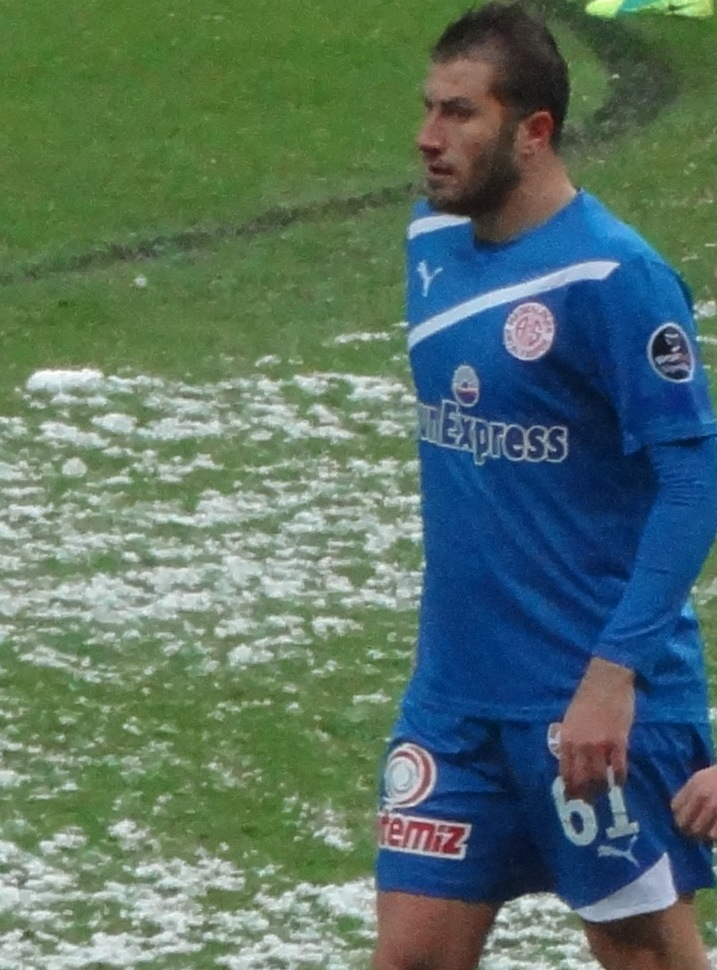

Personal information
- Full name: Mehmet Yılmaz
- Date of birth: May 22, 1979 (age 47)
- Place of birth: Of, Trabzon, Turkey
- Height: 1.85 m (6 ft 1 in)
- Position: Forward

Senior career*
Years	Team	Apps	(Gls)
1997–1998	Trabzon Telekomspor	29	(9)
1998–1999	Gümüşhanespor	26	(6)
1999–2001	Dardanel Spor	57	(27)
2001–2003	Altay	16	(9)
2001–2002	→ Samsunspor (loan)	33	(10)
2002–2003	→ Trabzonspor (loan)	33	(9)
2003–2006	Trabzonspor	63	(14)
2006	→ Denizlispor (loan)	15	(5)
2006–2008	Ankaraspor	46	(11)
2008–2009	Ankaragücü	26	(4)
2009–2010	Eskişehirspor	24	(5)
2010	Gaziantepspor	8	(1)
2011–2012	Antalyaspor	17	(1)
2012–2013	Akhisar Belediyespor	7	(0)
2013	Kızılcahamamspor	2	(0)

International career
2000–2001	Turkey U21	8	(0)
2003–2004	Turkey A2	2	(0)
2004	Turkey	1	(0)
- * Club domestic league appearances and goals as of 28 September 2015

Mehmet Yılmaz (born 22 May 1979) is a Turkish retired footballer.

== Club career ==
Yılmaz previously played for Gaziantepspor, B.B. Ankaraspor, Trabzonspor and Denizlispor, where he spent the second half of the 2005–2006 season on loan.

On 3 September 2012, he joined Akhisar Belediyespor on a two-year contract.

== Honours ==
Trabzonspor

- Turkish Cup: 2002–03, 2003–04
