= Volkan Bekiroğlu =

Turkish footballer

Volkan Kürşat Bekiroğlu (born 30 December 1977) is a Turkish football coach and former player, who currently is a head coach of club Adana Demirspor. He is playing leftback and left midfield. Standing at 175 cm, he wears the number 47 jersey. His brother Serkan Bekiroğlu is also footballer and currently plays for Karşıyaka S.K.

He played 3 times for Turkey U21.

He played for Adanaspor, Trabzonspor, Gaziantepspor (loan), Trabzonspor (loan back), Malatyaspor and Bursaspor.

== Honours ==
=== Club ===
Trabzonspor

- Turkish Cup: 2003–04
