= Sedat Yeşilkaya =

Turkish footballer

Sedat Yesilkaya
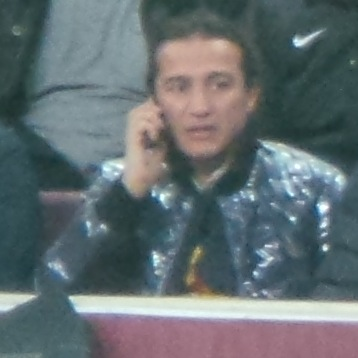
- Sedat Yeşilkaya in 2014

Personal information
- Full name: Sedat Yesilkaya
- Date of birth: 10 June 1980 (age 46)
- Place of birth: Istanbul, Turkey
- Height: 1.72 m (5 ft 8 in)
- Position: Attacking midfielder

Team information
- Current team: Konya Şekerspor
- Number: 20

Youth career
- 1990–1999: Vefa
- 1999–2000: Galatasaray

Senior career*
Years	Team	Apps	(Gls)
2000–2001	Galatasaray	0	(0)
2001–2002	Yıldırım Bosna S.K.	28	(6)
2002–2003	Kocaelispor	4	(0)
2003–2004	Konyaspor	47	(1)
2004–2008	Gençlerbirliği	40	(1)
2006	→ Denizlispor (loan)	6	(0)
2007	→ MKE Ankaragücü (loan)	18	(0)
2008–2009	Çaykur Rizespor	16	(0)
2009–2010	Kasımpaşa	11	(0)
2010–2011	Sivasspor	6	(0)
2011–	Konya Şekerspor	1	(0)
- * Club domestic league appearances and goals as of 18 February 2011

Sedat Yeşilkaya (born 10 June 1980) is a Turkish professional footballer who plays as an attacking midfielder for Konya Şekerspor in the TFF Second League.

Yeşilkaya previously played for Kocaelispor, Konyaspor and MKE Ankaragücü in the Süper Lig.
