= Semavi Özgür =

Turkish footballer

Personal information
- Date of birth: 6 February 1982 (age 44)
- Place of birth: Bulgaria
- Height: 1.77 m (5 ft 9 1/2 in)
- Position: Central midfielder

Youth career
- 1993–1999: İzmir Ceylanspor
- 1999–2001: Petkimspor

Senior career*
Years	Team	Apps	(Gls)
2001–2004	Petkimspor	66	(12)
2004–2007	Alanyaspor	88	(3)
2007–2008	Kocaelispor	26	(8)
2008–2010	Ankaragücü	35	(0)
2010–2011	Manisaspor	6	(0)
2011	Çaykur Rizespor	3	(0)
2011–2012	Tavşanlı Linyitspor	27	(2)
2012–2013	Alanyaspor	27	(1)
2013–2014	Amed SK	31	(1)
2014–2015	Altay	15	(0)
2015–2016	Hatayspor	34	(1)
2017–2019	Somaspor		
- * Club domestic league appearances and goals

Semavi Özgür (born 6 February 1982) is a Turkish former football player.

== Personal life ==
He was born in Bulgaria as a child of a family belonging to the Turkish minority in Bulgaria. In the 1980s, Semavi's family immigrated to Turkey and settled in Izmir.
