= 2003–04 Turkish Cup =

Türkiye Kupası

Tournament details
- Country: Turkey
- Teams: 72

Final positions
- Champions: Trabzonspor (7th title)
- Runners-up: Gençlerbirliği

Tournament statistics
- Top goal scorer(s): Tuncay Şanlı; Volkan Bekiroğlu; Zdravko Lazarov; Tayfun Türkmen (3 goals each)

The 2003–04 Turkish Cup was the 42nd edition of the annual tournament that determined the association football Super League (Süper Lig) Turkish Cup (Turkish: Türkiye Kupası) champion under the auspices of the Turkish Football Federation (Turkish: Türkiye Futbol Federasyonu; TFF). Trabzonspor defended its 41st edition achievement in a rematch with Gençlerbirliği 4–0. The results of the tournament also determined which clubs would be promoted or relegated.

== Qualifying round ==
Team 1	Score	Team 2
Adana Demirspor	4–1	Şanlıurfaspor
Altay	1–0	Göztepe
Antalyaspor	1–0	Marmaris Belediyespor
Aydınspor	2–6	Konyaspor
Sivasspor	2–3	Kayserispor
Türk Telekomspor	1–0	Ankaraspor
Yimpaş Yozgatspor	0–6	Kayseri Erciyesspor
Ankara Demirspor	2–4	Etimesgut Şekerspor
Sakaryaspor	3–2	Bursa Merinosspor
Kocaelispor	4–0	Sarıyer
İstanbul BB	2–1 (aet)	Zonguldakspor
Hatayspor	0–1 (aet)	Mersin İdman Yurdu
Erzurumspor	2–4	Çaykur Rizespor
Gümüşhanespor	2–3	Akçaabat Sebatspor
Çanakkale Dardanelspor	0–1	Vestel Manisaspor
Gaziantep BB	Bye	

== First round ==
Team 1	Score	Team 2
Samsunspor	2–0	Mersin İdman Yurdu
Gençlerbirliği	2–0	Altay
Trabzonspor	3–1	Kayserispor
Kayseri Erciyesspor	0–1	Bursaspor
Etimesgut Şekerspor	0–3	Diyarbakırspor
Beşiktaş	2–1	Kocaelispor
Sakaryaspor	2–3	Denizlispor
Adana Demirspor	0–1	Ankaragücü
Fenerbahçe	3–0	Gaziantep BB
Galatasaray	4–1	Türk Telekom
Vestel Manisaspor	3–2 (aet)	Karşıyaka SK
Elazığspor	2–3	Çaykur Rizespor
Akçaabat Sebatspor	0–3	Gaziantepspor
Antalyaspor	0–2	Istanbulspor
Konyaspor	3–2	Adanaspor
Malatyaspor	3–1	İstanbul BB

== Second round ==
Team 1	Score	Team 2
Gaziantepspor	4–1	Beşiktaş
Gençlerbirliği	1–0	Malatyaspor
Diyarbakırspor	0–1	Trabzonspor
Galatasaray	0–5	Çaykur Rizespor
Bursaspor	0–1	Konyaspor
Istanbulspor	1–0	Ankaragücü
Vestel Manisaspor	0–1 (aet)	Denizlispor
Samsunspor	0–1 (aet)	Fenerbahçe

== Bracket ==
Quarter-finals
Çaykur Rizespor	2
Fenerbahçe (a.e.t.)	4
Gençlerbirliği	2
Denizlispor	0
Gaziantepspor	0
İstanbulspor (p)	0
Trabzonspor (a.e.t.)	2
Konyaspor	1

Semi-finals
Fenerbahçe	2
Gençlerbirliği	4
İstanbulspor	0
Trabzonspor	2

Final
Trabzonspor	4
Gençlerbirliği	0

== Quarter-finals ==
Team 1	Score	Team 2
Gençlerbirliği	2–0	Denizlispor
Trabzonspor	2–1 (aet)	Konyaspor
Çaykur Rizespor	2–4 (aet)	Fenerbahçe
Gaziantepspor	0–0 (4–5 p)	Istanbulspor

== Semi-finals ==
=== Summary table ===
Team 1	Score	Team 2
İstanbulspor	0–2	Trabzonspor
Fenerbahçe	2–4	Gençlerbirliği

=== Matches ===
17 March 2004 Semi-final	İstanbulspor	0–2	Trabzonspor	Istanbul, Turkey
14:03 EET (UTC+02)		Report	Fatih 2'; Ahinful 44'	Stadium: Güngören M.Yahya Baş Stadium; Referee: Bülent Demirlek

17 March 2004 Semi-final	Fenerbahçe	2–4	Gençlerbirliği	Istanbul, Turkey
20:00 EET (UTC+02)	Tuncay 60' van Hooijdonk 85'	Report	Tomas 42' (o.g.); Skoko 56'; Ali 80'; Mustafa 89'	Stadium: Şükrü Saracoğlu Stadium; Referee: Ali Aydın

== Final ==
5 May 2004 Final	Trabzonspor	4–0	Gençlerbirliği	Istanbul, Turkey
20:00 EEST (UTC+03)	Mehmet 22'; Gökdeniz 70', 77' (pen.); Ahinful 88' (pen.)	Report		Stadium: Atatürk Olympic Stadium; Attendance: 40,000; Referee: Kuddusi Müftüoğlu
