= Mamak FK =

Turkish football club

Başkent Akademi Futbol
- Full name: Başkent Akademi Kulübü
- Founded: 1984 2002 2021
- Ground: Mamak Şehir Stadı, Mamak
- Capacity: 3,000
- Chairman: Abdulkadir Dişçi
- Manager: Alper Gülter
- 2019–20: TFF Second League, White, 15th
Home colours	Away colours

Mamak Futbol Kulübü, formerly known as Başkent Akademi Futbol Kulübü and BAKspor, is a Turkish professional football club located in Mamak, Ankara.

== History ==
Former club crest

The team was established as Egospor in the year 1984. The name was changed to Bugsaş S.K. in 2005. In 2012, Polatlı Bugsaşspor became the new name, lasting one season before changing to Bugsaşspor. In December 2018, the club changed its name to Başkent Akademi FK. They previously played at the OSTİM Stadium in Sincan, the outer borough of Ankara where they were known as the Sincan Kaplanları, or Sincan Tigers.
