= 2008–09 Galatasaray S.K. season =

Galatasaray
2008–09 season
- President: (Turkey) Adnan Polat
- Head coach: (Germany) Michael Skibbe (until 23 February 2009) (Turkey) Bülent Korkmaz (until end of the season)
- Stadium: Ali Sami Yen Stadı
- Süper Lig: 5th
- Turkish Cup: Quarter-finals
- UEFA Champions League: Third qualifying round
- UEFA Cup: Round of 16
- Turkish Super Cup: Winners
- Top goalscorer: League: Milan Baroš (20); All: Milan Baroš (26)
- Average home league attendance: 21,500
Home colours	Away colours	Third colours

The 2008–09 season was Galatasaray's 105th in existence and the 51st consecutive season in the Süper Lig. This article shows statistics of the club's players in the season, and also lists all matches that the club have played in the season.

== Current squad ==
As of March 10, 2009; according to the official website. . Note: Flags indicate national team as defined under FIFA eligibility rules; some limited exceptions apply. Players may hold more than one non-FIFA nationality.

No.	Pos.	Nation	Player
1	GK	TUR	Aykut Erçetin
2	DF	TUR	Emre Güngör
3	DF	TUR	Uğur Uçar
6	MF	SWE	Tobias Linderoth
7	MF	TUR	Aydın Yılmaz
8	MF	GER	Barış Özbek
10	MF	BRA	Lincoln
11	MF	TUR	Hasan Şaş (1st vice-captain)
14	MF	TUR	Mehmet Topal
15	FW	CZE	Milan Baroš
17	FW	TUR	Yaser Yıldız
18	MF	TUR	Ayhan Akman (2nd vice-captain)
19	MF	AUS	Harry Kewell
20	FW	COD	Shabani Nonda
21	DF	TUR	Emre Aşık

No.	Pos.	Nation	Player
22	DF	TUR	Hakan Balta
23	DF	TUR	Serkan Kurtuluş
26	GK	ITA	Morgan De Sanctis
28	DF	TUR	Semih Kaya
35	MF	TUR	Ferdi Elmas
54	GK	TUR	Orkun Uşak
55	MF	TUR	Sabri Sarıoğlu
60	DF	TUR	Alparslan Erdem
61	FW	TUR	Serkan Çalık
66	MF	TUR	Arda Turan
74	DF	TUR	Volkan Yaman
76	DF	TUR	Servet Çetin
80	DF	TUR	Murat Akça
87	MF	TUR	Mehmet Güven
99	FW	TUR	Ümit Karan (captain)

== Transfers ==
=== In ===
#	Pos	Player	From	Fee	Date
7	MF	(Turkey) Aydın Yılmaz	İ.B.B.Spor	Loan return	
17	FW	(Turkey) Yaser Yıldız	Kartalspor	unknown	
21	DF	(Turkey) Emre Aşık	Ankaraspor	Loan return	
35	MF	(Turkey) Ferdi Elmas	Çaykur Rizespor	unknown	
19	MF	(Australia) Harry Kewell	Liverpool	Free	03–07–2008
5	DF	(Portugal) Fernando Meira	VfB Stuttgart	unknown	22–07–2008
26	GK	(Italy) Morgan De Sanctis	Sevilla	Loan	31–07–2008
60	DF	(Turkey) Alparslan Erdem	Werder Bremen II	unknown	02–08–2008
15	FW	(Czech Republic) Milan Baroš	Lyon	unknown	26–08–2008
23	DF	(Turkey) Serkan Kurtuluş	Bursaspor	unknown	01–09–2008

=== Out ===
#	Pos	Player	To	Fee	Date
4	DF	(Cameroon) Rigobert Song	Trabzonspor		
5	DF	(Turkey) Orhan Ak	Antalyaspor		
5	DF	(Portugal) Fernando Meira	Zenit	€ 6,6 million	10–03–2009
7	MF	(Turkey) Okan Buruk	İ.B.B.Spor		
9	FW	(Turkey) Hakan Şükür	Retired		
13	DF	(Turkey) Uğur Akdemir	Çaykur Rizespor		
15	MF	(Ghana) Ahmed Barusso	AS Roma	Loan return	
19	DF	(Algeria) Ismaël Bouzid	Troyes AC		
30	FW	(Turkey) Çağrı Yarkın	Çaykur Rizespor		

=== Loaned out ===
#	Pos	Player	To	Start	End
	DF	(Turkey) Gür Ege Gürel	Beylerbeyi	10–06–2008	31–05–2009
	DF	(Turkey) Serdar Keşçi	Beylerbeyi	10–06–2008	31–05–2009
	FW	(Turkey) Fatih Sercan Ekinci	Beylerbeyi	10–06–2008	31–05–2009
	FW	(Turkey) Mehmet Düz	Beylerbeyi	10–06–2008	31–05–2009
	MF	(Turkey) Eray Fırat	Beylerbeyi	11–06–2008	02–02–2009
	DF	(Turkey) İlker Cihan	Beylerbeyi	16–06–2008	27–01–2009
	MF	(Turkey) Recep Soner Cihan	Beylerbeyi	16–06–2008	27–01–2009
	MF	(Turkey) Oğuz Sabankay	Eskişehirspor	03–07–2008	31–05–2009
	MF	(Turkey) Volkan Bekçi	Beylerbeyi	04–07–2008	31–05–2009
16	MF	(Argentina) Marcelo Carrusca	Cruz Azul	08–07–2008	
	DF	(Turkey) Erkan Ferin	Beylerbeyi	31–07–2008	15–01–2009
	FW	(Turkey) Özgürcan Özcan	Sakaryaspor	13–08–2008	31–05–2009
	DF	(Turkey) Uğur Erdoğan	Gaziantep B.B.	26–08–2008	31–05–2009
	MF	(Turkey) Cihan Can	Gaziantep B.B.	26–08–2008	31–05–2009
	MF	(Turkey) Mülayim Erdem	Gaziantep B.B.	26–08–2008	31–05–2009
	FW	(Turkey) Cafercan Aksu	Gaziantep B.B.	26–08–2008	31–05–2009
	FW	(Turkey) Efecan Karaca	Gaziantep B.B.	26–08–2008	31–05–2009
88	GK	(Turkey) Fırat Kocaoğlu	Beylerbeyi	01–09–2008	31–05–2009
	DF	(Turkey) Anıl Karaer	MKE Ankaragücü	01–09–2008	02–02–2009
83	FW	(Turkey) Erhan Şentürk	Diyarbakırspor	01–09–2008	31–05–2009
	FW	(Turkey) Necati Ateş	Real Sociedad	01–09–2008	
	MF	(Turkey) İrfan Başaran	Beylerbeyi	02–09–2008	31–05–2009
	DF	(Turkey) Erkan Ferin	İstanbulspor	15–01–2009	31–05–2009
	DF	(Turkey) İlker Cihan	İstanbulspor	27–01–2009	31–05–2010
	MF	(Turkey) Recep Soner Cihan	İstanbulspor	27–01–2009	31–05–2010
	DF	(Turkey) Anıl Karaer	Beylerbeyi	02–02–2009	31–05–2009
	MF	(Turkey) Harun Temur	Beylerbeyi	02–02–2009	31–05–2009

== Squad statistics ==
No.	Pos.	Name	TSL		FTC		TSC		UCL		UC		Total		Discipline	
No.	Pos.	Name	Apps	Goals	Apps	Goals	Apps	Goals	Apps	Goals	Apps	Goals	Apps	Goals	Yellow card	Red card
1	GK	(Turkey) Aykut Erçetin	1	0	6	0	1	0	2	0	0	0	10	0	0	0
2	DF	(Turkey) Emre Güngör	5	0	2	0	0	0	1	0	1	0	9	0	1	1
3	DF	(Turkey) Uğur Uçar	1	0	0	0	0	0	0	0	0	0	1	0	0	0
5	DF	(Portugal) Fernando Meira	21	0	6	0	1	0	2	0	8	0	38	0	8	0
6	MF	(Sweden) Tobias Linderoth	2	0	0	0	0	0	1	0	0	0	3	0	0	0
7	MF	(Turkey) Aydın Yılmaz	15	1	3	2	0	0	1	0	2	0	21	3	1	0
8	MF	(Germany) Barış Özbek	25	3	3	0	1	0	1	0	6	0	36	3	5	0
10	MF	(Brazil) Lincoln	23	8	3	0	1	0	2	0	10	1	39	9	7	2
11	MF	(Turkey) Hasan Şaş	8	0	0	0	1	0	2	0	2	0	13	0	2	0
14	MF	(Turkey) Mehmet Topal	21	1	5	0	1	0	2	0	4	0	33	1	3	0
15	FW	(Czech Republic) Milan Baroš	31	20	3	1	0	0	0	0	9	5	43	26	15	0
17	FW	(Turkey) Yaser Yıldız	12	0	4	2	0	0	0	0	3	1	19	3	1	1
18	MF	(Turkey) Ayhan Akman	31	1	4	1	1	0	1	0	9	1	46	3	10	2
19	MF	(Australia) Harry Kewell	26	8	1	0	1	1	1	0	8	4	37	13	4	0
20	FW	(Democratic Republic of the Congo) Shabani Nonda	24	5	1	0	1	1	2	2	7	0	35	8	5	0
21	DF	(Turkey) Emre Aşık	18	0	3	0	0	0	1	0	8	1	30	1	12	2
22	DF	(Turkey) Hakan Balta	28	1	6	0	1	0	2	0	7	0	44	1	2	0
23	DF	(Turkey) Serkan Kurtuluş	8	0	0	0	0	0	0	0	3	0	11	0	2	0
26	GK	(Italy) Morgan De Sanctis	31	0	0	0	0	0	0	0	10	0	41	0	2	0
28	DF	(Turkey) Semih Kaya	3	0	1	0	0	0	0	0	0	0	4	0	0	0
35	MF	(Turkey) Ferdi Elmas	0	0	3	0	0	0	0	0	0	0	3	0	0	0
54	GK	(Turkey) Orkun Uşak	2	0	0	0	0	0	0	0	0	0	2	0	0	0
55	MF	(Turkey) Sabri Sarıoğlu	25	0	5	0	1	0	1	0	8	1	40	1	7	0
60	DF	(Turkey) Alparslan Erdem	2	0	1	0	1	0	0	0	1	0	5	0	0	0
61	FW	(Turkey) Serkan Çalık	0	0	0	0	0	0	0	0	0	0	0	0	0	0
66	MF	(Turkey) Arda Turan	29	7	6	2	0	0	2	0	9	2	46	11	7	1
74	DF	(Turkey) Volkan Yaman	20	0	4	0	1	0	0	0	8	0	33	0	1	0
76	DF	(Turkey) Servet Çetin	20	2	3	0	1	0	2	0	7	0	33	2	5	0
80	DF	(Turkey) Murat Akça	0	0	1	0	0	0	0	0	0	0	1	0	0	0
83	FW	(Turkey) Erhan Şentürk	0	0	0	0	0	0	1	0	0	0	1	0	0	0
87	MF	(Turkey) Mehmet Güven	16	0	3	0	0	0	0	0	5	0	24	0	0	0
99	FW	(Turkey) Ümit Karan	18	0	5	2	0	0	1	0	4	1	28	3	3	1

Statistics accurate as of match played June 1, 2009

== Competitions ==
=== Turkish Super Cup ===
All times at CEST

17 August 2008 Final	Galatasaray	2–1	Kayserispor	Duisburg, Germany
20:00	Kewell 66'; Nonda 73'	(Report)	Topuz 89'	Stadium: MSV-Arena; Referee: Selçuk Dereli

=== Süper Lig ===
==== League table ====
Pos	Team	Pld	W	D	L	GF	GA	GD	Pts	Qualification or relegation
3	Trabzonspor	34	19	8	7	54	34	+20	65	Qualification to Europa League play-off round
4	Fenerbahçe	34	18	7	9	60	36	+24	61	Qualification to Europa League third qualifying round
5	Galatasaray	34	18	7	9	57	39	+18	61	Qualification to Europa League second qualifying round (Note: 2008–09 Turkish Cup was won by Champions League-qualified side Beşiktaş. Since cup runners-up Fenerbahçe secured a place in the European competitions via league position, the spot allocation for the 2009–10 UEFA Europa League effectively reverted to league positions.)
6	Bursaspor	34	16	10	8	47	36	+11	58	
7	Kayserispor	34	13	11	10	38	26	+12	50	

Rules for classification: 1st points; 2nd head-to-head points; 3rd head-to-head goal difference; 4th head-to-head goals scored; 5th head-to-head away goals scored; 6th goal difference; 7th goals scored

==== Results summary ====
Overall								Home						Away					
Pld	W	D	L	GF	GA	GD	Pts	W	D	L	GF	GA	GD	W	D	L	GF	GA	GD
34	18	7	9	57	39	+18	61	11	4	2	35	18	+17	7	3	7	22	21	+1

Source: Turkcell Super League

==== Results by round ====
Round	1	2	3	4	5	6	7	8	9	10	11	12	13	14	15	16	17	18	19	20	21	22	23	24	25	26	27	28	29	30	31	32	33	34
Ground	H	A	H	A	H	A	H	A	H	A	H	A	H	A	A	H	A	A	H	A	H	A	H	A	H	A	H	A	H	A	H	H	A	H
Result	W	D	D	W	W	L	W	L	W	L	W	D	W	W	W	W	L	W	D	L	L	W	W	D	L	W	D	W	D	L	W	W	L	W
Position	1	5	6	4	3	5	4	6	5	5	5	5	4	3	3	3	3	3	3	3	5	5	5	5	5	4	5	4	4	4	4	4	5	5

Source: Galatasaray SK
A = Away; H = Home; W = Win; D = Draw; L = Loss

==== Matches ====
Kick-off listed in local time (EEST)

23 August 2008 1	Galatasaray	4–1	Denizlispor	Istanbul
19:00	Kewell 35'; Balta 75'; Özbek 83'; Lincoln 89'	(Report)	Yiğen 44'	Stadium: Ali Sami Yen Stadium; Referee: Mustafa Kamil Abitoğlu

31 August 2008 2	Kayserispor	0–0	Galatasaray	Kayseri
21:00		(Report)		Stadium: Kayseri Atatürk Stadium; Referee: Bünyamin Gezer

13 September 2008 3	Galatasaray	1–1	Antalyaspor	Istanbul
21:45	Nonda 10'	(Report)	Ngwenya 32'	Stadium: Ali Sami Yen Stadium; Referee: Bülent Yıldırım

21 September 2008 4	Kocaelispor	1–4	Galatasaray	İzmit
19:00	Gülleri 10'	(Report)	Baroš 31', 80'; Nonda 57'; Kewell 82'	Stadium: Ismet Pasa Stadium; Referee: Selçuk Dereli

29 September 2008 5	Galatasaray	4–1	Konyaspor	Istanbul
21:00	Baroš 8', 61'; Lincoln 51'; Kewell 67'	(Report)	Albayrak 11'	Stadium: Ali Sami Yen Stadium; Referee: Yunus Yıldırım

5 October 2008 6	Bursaspor	2–1	Galatasaray	Bursa
18:00	Sarp 38'; Yıldırım 48'	(Report)	Turan 56'	Stadium: Bursa Atatürk Stadium; Referee: Hüseyin Göçek

19 October 2008 7	Galatasaray	3–0	Trabzonspor	Istanbul
19:00	Turan 26'; Çetin 32'; Lincoln 60'	(Report)		Stadium: Ali Sami Yen Stadium; Referee: Bünyamin Gezer

26 October 2008 8	Eskişehirspor	4–2	Galatasaray	Eskişehir
19:00	Youla 20', 90+1'; Önür 66'; Lovrek 90+8'	(Report)	Akman 35'; Baroš 50'	Stadium: Eskişehir Atatürk Stadium; Referee: Fırat Aydınus

2 November 2008 9	Galatasaray	3–1	Gaziantepspor	Istanbul
19:00	Kewell 9'; Lincoln 11'; Turan 82'	(Report)	Tabata 38' (pen.)	Stadium: Ali Sami Yen Stadium; Referee: Halis Özkahya

9 November 2008 10	Fenerbahçe	4–1	Galatasaray	Istanbul
19:00	Şahin 7'; Aşık 28' (o.g.); Lugano 48'; Deivid 89'	(Report)	Lincoln 2'	Stadium: Şükrü Saracoğlu Stadium; Referee: Hüseyin Göçek

16 November 2008 11	Galatasaray	2–0	Istanbul B.B.	Istanbul
19:00	Kewell 38'; Lincoln 83'	(Report)		Stadium: Ali Sami Yen Stadium; Referee: Selçuk Dereli

22 November 2008 12	Ankaraspor	0–0	Galatasaray	Ankara
19:00		(Report)		Stadium: Yenikent Asaş Stadium; Referee: Bülent Yıldırım

30 November 2008 13	Galatasaray	3–1	Hacettepe	Istanbul
19:00	Baroš 44', 57' (pen.), 72'	(Report)		Stadium: Ali Sami Yen Stadium; Referee: Süleyman Abay

7 December 2008 14	Ankaragücü	0–3	Galatasaray	Ankara
19:00		(Report)	Baroš 60', 65'; Kewell 61'	Stadium: Ankara 19 Mayıs Stadium; Referee: Suat Arslanboğa

12 December 2008 15	Gençlerbirliği	1–3	Galatasaray	Ankara
20:00	Eşer 25'	(Report)	Lincoln 28'; Baroš 38'; Turan 42'	Stadium: Ankara 19 Mayıs Stadium; Referee: Halis Özkahya

21 December 2008 16	Galatasaray	4–2	Beşiktaş	Istanbul
19:00	Çetin 8'; Baroš 15' (pen.), 53', 67' (pen.)	(Report)	Delgado 13'; Hološko 55'	Stadium: Ali Sami Yen Stadium; Referee: Cüneyt Çakır

24 January 2009 17	Sivasspor	2–0	Galatasaray	Sivas
14:00	Dereli 51'; Badur 66'	(Report)		Stadium: Sivas 4 Eylül Stadium; Referee: Yunus Yıldırım

31 January 2009 18	Denizlispor	0–2	Galatasaray	Denizli
19:00		(Report)	Baroš 9'; Nonda 71'	Stadium: Atatürk Stadium; Referee: Koray Gençerler

7 February 2009 19	Galatasaray	1–1	Kayserispor	Istanbul
19:00	Nonda 27'	(Report)	Boyraz 89'	Stadium: Ali Sami Yen Stadium; Referee: Selçuk Dereli

14 February 2009 20	Antalyaspor	1–0	Galatasaray	Antalya
15:00	Kuru 60'	(Report)		Stadium: Antalya Atatürk Stadium; Referee: Halis Özkahya

22 February 2009 21	Galatasaray	2–5	Kocaelispor	Istanbul
19:00	Topal 14'; Lincoln 73'	(Report)	Gülleri 24', 64', 87', 89'; Hacıoğlu 34'	Stadium: Ali Sami Yen Stadium; Referee: Deniz Çoban

1 March 2009 22	Konyaspor	0–1	Galatasaray	Konya
19:00		(Report)	Turan 10'	Stadium: Konya Atatürk Stadium; Referee: Tolga Özkalfa

6 March 2009 23	Galatasaray	2–1	Bursaspor	Istanbul
20:00	Baroš 10'; Yılmaz 30'	(Report)	Öztürk 53'	Stadium: Ali Sami Yen Stadium; Referee: İlker Meral

15 March 2009 24	Trabzonspor	2–2	Galatasaray	Trabzon
19:00	Alanzinho 7'; Colman 85'	(Report)	Baroš 12'; Turan 60'	Stadium: Trabzon Hüseyin Avni Aker Stadium; Referee: Yunus Yıldırım

22 March 2009 25	Galatasaray	0–1	Eskişehirspor	Istanbul
19:00		(Report)	Youla 69'	Stadium: Ali Sami Yen Stadium; Referee: Bünyamin Gezer

6 April 2009 26	Gaziantepspor	0–1	Galatasaray	Gaziantep
20:00		(Report)	Baroš 10'	Stadium: Gaziantep Kamil Ocak Stadium; Referee: Mustafa Kamil Abitoğlu

12 April 2009 27	Galatasaray	0–0	Fenerbahçe	Istanbul
19:00		(Report)		Stadium: Ali Sami Yen Stadium; Referee: Fırat Aydınus

19 April 2009 28	Istanbul B.B.	0–1	Galatasaray	Istanbul
16:15		(Report)	Baroš 65'	Stadium: Atatürk Olympic Stadium; Referee: Hüseyin Göçek

26 April 2009 29	Galatasaray	1–1	Ankaraspor	Istanbul
20:00	Özbek 23'	(Report)	Méyé 89'	Stadium: Ali Sami Yen Stadium; Referee: Deniz Çoban

1 May 2009 30	Hacettepe	2–0	Galatasaray	Ankara
20:00	Tambwe 58'; Şahin 89'	(Report)		Stadium: Ankara 19 Mayıs Stadium; Referee: Halis Özkahya

9 May 2009 31	Galatasaray	1–0	Ankaragücü	Kayseri
19:00	Baroš 12' (pen.)	(Report)		Stadium: Kadir Has Stadium; Referee: Suat Arslanboğa

17 May 2009 32	Galatasaray	2–1	Gençlerbirliği	Istanbul
20:00	Kewell 63'; Özbek 67'	(Report)	Kahê 89'	Stadium: Ali Sami Yen Stadium; Referee: Koray Gençerler

24 May 2009 33	Beşiktaş	2–1	Galatasaray	Istanbul
20:00	Topal 40' (o.g.); Şimşek 58'	(Report)	Kewell 48'	Stadium: BJK İnönü Stadium; Referee: Mustafa Kamil Abitoğlu

30 May 2009 34	Galatasaray	2–1	Sivasspor	Istanbul
20:00	Turan 12'; Nonda 82'	(Report)	Tum 46'	Stadium: Ali Sami Yen Stadium; Referee: Cüneyt Çakır

=== Turkish Cup ===
Kick-off listed in local time (EEST)

==== Group stage ====
Pos	Team	Pld	W	D	L	GF	GA	GD	Pts
1	Galatasaray	4	3	1	0	8	4	+4	10
2	Ankaraspor	4	2	1	1	9	7	+2	7
3	Kayserispor	4	2	1	1	6	4	+2	7
4	Altay	4	1	1	2	7	6	+1	4
5	Malatyaspor	4	0	0	4	5	14	−9	0

Source: tff.org (in Turkish)
Rules for classification: 1) points; 2) goal difference; 3) number of goals scored.

30 October 2008 1	Ankaraspor	1–1	Galatasaray	Ankara
16:00	de Nigris 44'	(Report)	Karan 8'	Stadium: Yenikent Asaş Stadium; Referee: İlker Meral

13 November 2008 2	Galatasaray	1–0	Kayserispor	Istanbul
20:00	Yılmaz 89'	(Report)		Stadium: Ali Sami Yen Stadium; Referee: Mustafa Kamil Abitoğlu

8 January 2009 3	Altay	1–2	Galatasaray	İzmir
20:00	Özer 21'	(Report)	Yıldız 85'; Baroš 89'	Stadium: İzmir Atatürk Stadium; Referee: Deniz Çoban

17 January 2009 4	Galatasaray	4–2	Malatyaspor	Istanbul
19:00	Yılmaz 18'; Karan 44'; Turan 70'; Yıldız 85' (pen.)	(Report)	Akıcı 65'; Koyuncu 75'	Stadium: Ali Sami Yen Stadium; Referee: Tolga Özkalfa

=== Quarter-finals ===
27 January 2009 First leg	Galatasaray	1–1	Sivasspor	Istanbul
20:30	Akman 89'	(Report)	Balili 74'	Stadium: Ali Sami Yen Stadium; Referee: Hüseyin Göçek

3 February 2009 Second leg	Sivasspor	1–1 (a.e.t.) (2–2 agg.) (3–1 p)	Galatasaray	Sivas
14:00	Kamanan 30'	(Report)	Turan 8'	Stadium: Sivas 4 Eylül Stadium; Referee: Bünyamin Gezer
	Penalties
	Kurtuluş (penalty missed); Diallo (penalty scored); Balili (penalty scored); Kamanan (penalty scored)		(penalty missed) Turan; (penalty scored) Balta; (penalty missed) Karan; (penalty missed) Yıldız

=== UEFA Champions League ===
All times at CET

==== Third qualifying round ====
13 August 2008 First leg	Galatasaray (Turkey)	2–2	(Romania) Steaua București	Istanbul, Turkey
20:15	Nonda 19', 47'	(Report)	Moreno 5'; Nicoliţă 13'	Stadium: Ali Sami Yen Stadium; Referee: Laurent Duhamel (France)

27 August 2008 Second leg	Steaua București (Romania)	1–0 (3–2 agg.)	(Turkey) Galatasaray	Bucharest, Romania
19:45	Nicoliţă 57'	(Report)		Stadium: Stadionul Steaua; Referee: Matteo Trefoloni (Italy)

=== UEFA Cup ===
All times at CET

==== First round ====
18 September 2008 First leg	Bellinzona (Switzerland)	3–4	(Turkey) Galatasaray	Basel, Switzerland
20:00	Sermeter 32'; Lustrinelli 47'; La Rocca 90'	(Report)	Kewell 39'; Baroš 61', 81'; Lincoln 90+5'	Stadium: St. Jakob-Park; Referee: Sorin Corpodean (Romania)

2 October 2008 Second leg	Galatasaray (Turkey)	2–1 (6–4 agg.)	(Switzerland) Bellinzona	Istanbul, Turkey
19:00	Baroš 24' (pen.); Yıldız 86'	(Report)	Sermeter 52' (pen.)	Stadium: Ali Sami Yen Stadium; Referee: Aleksei Nikolaev (Russia)

==== Group stage ====
Pos	Team	Pld	W	D	L	GF	GA	GD	Pts	Qualification	MET	GAL	OLY	HER	BEN
1	(Ukraine) Metalist Kharkiv	4	3	1	0	3	0	+3	10	Advance to knockout stage	—	—	1–0	0–0	—
2	(Turkey) Galatasaray	4	3	0	1	4	1	+3	9	Advance to knockout stage	0–1	—	1–0	—	—
3	(Greece) Olympiacos	4	2	0	2	9	3	+6	6	Advance to knockout stage	—	—	—	4–0	5–1
4	(Germany) Hertha BSC	4	0	2	2	1	6	−5	2		—	0–1	—	—	1–1
5	(Portugal) Benfica	4	0	1	3	2	9	−7	1		0–1	0–2	—	—	—

Source: RSSSF

23 October 2008 1	Galatasaray (Turkey)	1–0	(Greece) Olympiacos	Istanbul, Turkey
21:15	Kewell 25'	(Report)		Stadium: Ali Sami Yen Stadium; Referee: Eduardo Iturralde González (Spain)

6 November 2008 2	Benfica (Portugal)	0–2	(Turkey) Galatasaray	Lisbon, Portugal
21:30		(Report)	Aşık 51'; Karan 69'	Stadium: Estádio da Luz; Referee: Martin Atkinson (England)

27 November 2008 3	Galatasaray (Turkey)	0–1	(Ukraine) Metalist Kharkiv	Istanbul, Turkey
19:00		(Report)	Edmar 81'	Stadium: Ali Sami Yen Stadium; Referee: Jacet Granat (Poland)

3 December 2008 4	Hertha Berlin (Germany)	0–1	(Turkey) Galatasaray	Berlin, Germany
20:45		(Report)	Baroš 69' (pen.)	Stadium: Olympic Stadium; Referee: Nicola Rizzoli (Italy)

==== Knockout phase ====
===== Round of 32 =====
18 February 2009 First leg	Bordeaux (France)	0–0	(Turkey) Galatasaray	Bordeaux, France
20:45		(Report)		Stadium: Stade Chaban-Delmas; Referee: Claudio Circhetta (Switzerland)

26 February 2009 Second leg	Galatasaray (Turkey)	4–3 (4–3 agg.)	(France) Bordeaux	Istanbul, Turkey
20:30	Turan 43', 65'; Kewell 45'; Sarıoğlu 90'	(Report)	Bellion 1'; Chamakh 72'; Cavenaghi 75'	Stadium: Ali Sami Yen Stadium; Referee: Craig Thomson (Scotland)

===== Round of 16 =====
12 March 2009 First leg	Hamburg (Germany)	1–1	(Turkey) Galatasaray	Hamburg, Germany
18:00	Jansen 50'	(Report)	Akman 33'	Stadium: HSH Nordbank Arena; Referee: Viktor Kassai (Hungary)

19 March 2009 Second leg	Galatasaray (Turkey)	2–3 (3–4 agg.)	(Germany) Hamburg	Istanbul, Turkey
20:30	Kewell 42' (pen.); Baroš 49'	(Report)	Guerrero 57', 60'; Olić 90'	Stadium: Ali Sami Yen Stadium; Referee: Pedro Proença (Portugal)

== Attendance ==
Competition	Av. Att.	Total Att.
Süper Lig	21,500	365,500
Türkiye Kupası	n/a	n/a
Europe	21,168	105,839
Total	21,424	471,339
