= Oğuz Sabankay =

Turkish footballer

Personal information
- Full name: Oğuz Sabankay
- Date of birth: 7 August 1987 (age 39)
- Place of birth: Akhisar, Turkey
- Height: 1.71 m (5 ft 7 in)
- Position: Attacking midfielder

Team information
- Current team: Kınık Belediyespor

Youth career
- 1999–2004: Akhisar Belediyespor
- 2004–2006: Galatasaray

Senior career*
Years	Team	Apps	(Gls)
2004–2006	Galatasaray A2	61	(2)
2006–2011	Galatasaray	1	(0)
2007–2008	→ Vestel Manisaspor (loan)	15	(0)
2008	→ Eskişehirspor (loan)	0	(0)
2009–2010	→ İstanbul BB (loan)	10	(0)
2010–2011	→ Kartalspor (loan)	7	(0)
2011–2012	Akyurt Şekerspor	22	(0)
2012–2014	Bucaspor	4	(0)
2014	Eyüpspor	15	(0)
2014–2016	Tarsus Idman Yurdu	37	(0)
2016–2018	Kemerspor 2003	40	(1)
2018–2019	Sinopspor	14	(0)
2020–	Kınık Belediyespor	0	(0)

International career
2002	Turkey U16	6	(0)
2003–2004	Turkey U17	25	(1)
2003–2005	Turkey U18	14	(1)
2004–2006	Turkey U19	19	(1)
2005	Turkey U20	2	(0)
2006–2008	Turkey U21	3	(0)
- * Club domestic league appearances and goals as of 10 February 2019

Oğuz Sabankay (born August 7, 1987, in Akhisar) is a Turkish footballer who plays as a midfielder for Kınık Belediyespor.

== Club career ==
=== Galatasaray ===
Oğuz was signed from Akhisar B.G.S. in the summer of 2004 by Galatasaray for their youth team on the same day rivals Fenerbahçe signed Brazilian playmaker Alex. It was an interesting occurrence while one rival team signed an aging star playmaker for the present the other signed a young star playmaker for the future.

Oğuz made his professional debut on August 13, 2006, in a home game against Kayserispor coming on in the 84th minute for Saša Ilić. Galatasaray went on to win the game 4–0.

=== Vestel Manisaspor ===
On January 12, 2007, Oğuz signed for Vestel Manisaspor on a one and a half seasons long loan contract. This move was seen as a great opportunity for Oğuz to gain first team experience in a town close to his hometown of Akhisar. Ersun Yanal who was the Manisaspor coach at the time had worked with Arda Turan who was proving to be a revelation at Galatasaray that year, the previous season. Many expected similar feats from Oğuz. His time at Manisaspor was ridden with injuries and the fact that Manisaspor kept on changing their manager almost every 3 months did not help him gain a first team spot on the team either. He parted ways with the club once his contract ran out.

=== Eskişehirspor ===
Oguz signed a one season long loan contract with Eskişehirspor during the summer of 2008 or the 2008–2009 season. Even though Rıza Çalımbay had stated that Oğuz was a player he was excited over signing he did not give him a chance in a single match despite Oğuz impressing in the pre-season training camp over the summer as well as scoring a nice goal in a friendly match. The contract was mutually terminated in mid-season as Oğuz looked to gain first team experience elsewhere.

=== Istanbul Büyükşehir Belediyespor ===
After leaving Eskişehirspor. Oğuz signed a one and a half seasons long contract with Istanbul Büyükşehir Belediyespor in January 2009. At Istanbul Büyükşehir Belediyespor he teams up with his former manager at the Galatasaray youth team and the U-17 Turkish NT, Abdullah Avcı.

=== Kartalspor ===
Oğuz joined Kartalspor on loan with fellow Galatasaray youth products Semih Kaya and Erhan Şentürk to work under Galatasaray legend Ergün Penbe for the 2010–2011 season.

== International career ==
He has represented the Turkey national team on several levels including 4 appearances for the U-21's. He has played 60 times for what is referred to as the A youth and 6 times for the B youth scoring on 3 occasions in total on both levels. His first ever national team goal was in a game against the Northern Ireland U-17's in a European championship qualifier match. The goal came in the 74th minute with the Turkish U-17's going on to win the game 5–2 in Northern Ireland.
