= Ferdi Elmas =

Turkish footballer

Personal information
- Full name: Ferdi Can Elmas
- Date of birth: 13 February 1985 (age 41)
- Place of birth: Amsterdam, Netherlands
- Height: 1.70 m (5 ft 7 in)
- Positions: Left winger; central midfielder

Youth career
- Ajax
- Waalwijk

Senior career*
Years	Team	Apps	(Gls)
2004–2005	RKC Waalwijk	9	(0)
2005–2008	Çaykur Rizespor	45	(4)
2007–2008	→ Ankaraspor (loan)	9	(1)
2008–2009	Galatasaray	0	(0)
2010–2011	Karabükspor	24	(2)
2011–2012	Karşıyaka	8	(0)
2013	FC Baku	6	(0)
2015	Gaziantep BB	0	(0)
2016	Manisa BB	5	(0)

International career
2001	Netherlands U17	3	(2)
2006–2007	Turkey U21	3	(0)
- * Club domestic league appearances and goals as of 26 August 2016 (UTC)

Ferdi Elmas (born 13 February 1985) is a Turkish former professional footballer who played as a winger.

== Club career ==
Born in Amsterdam, Netherlands, Elmas played for Ajax for over nine years in his youth, having come through the ranks of the club's elite Youth Team. He continued his career in Dutch football after transferring to RKC Waalwijk.

In 2004, he moved to Çaykur Rizespor, before completing a loan switch to Ankaraspor. During the summer transfer window of 2008, the Istanbul club Galatasaray signed the player on a three-year deal, expiring in June 2011. The transfer was a player-swap, with Uğur Akdemir being the player who left the team.

He was released by Galatasaray S.K. after a season after signing and signed a new deal with Turkish First Division team Karabükspor. In 2013, he was playing for FK Baku in the Azerbaijan Premier League.

== Personal life ==
He qualifies for both Dutch and Turkish citizenship as his mother is Dutch and his father is Turkish.

== Honours ==
Galatasaray

- Turkish Super Cup: 2008
