= Hakan Balta =

Turkish footballer (born 1983)

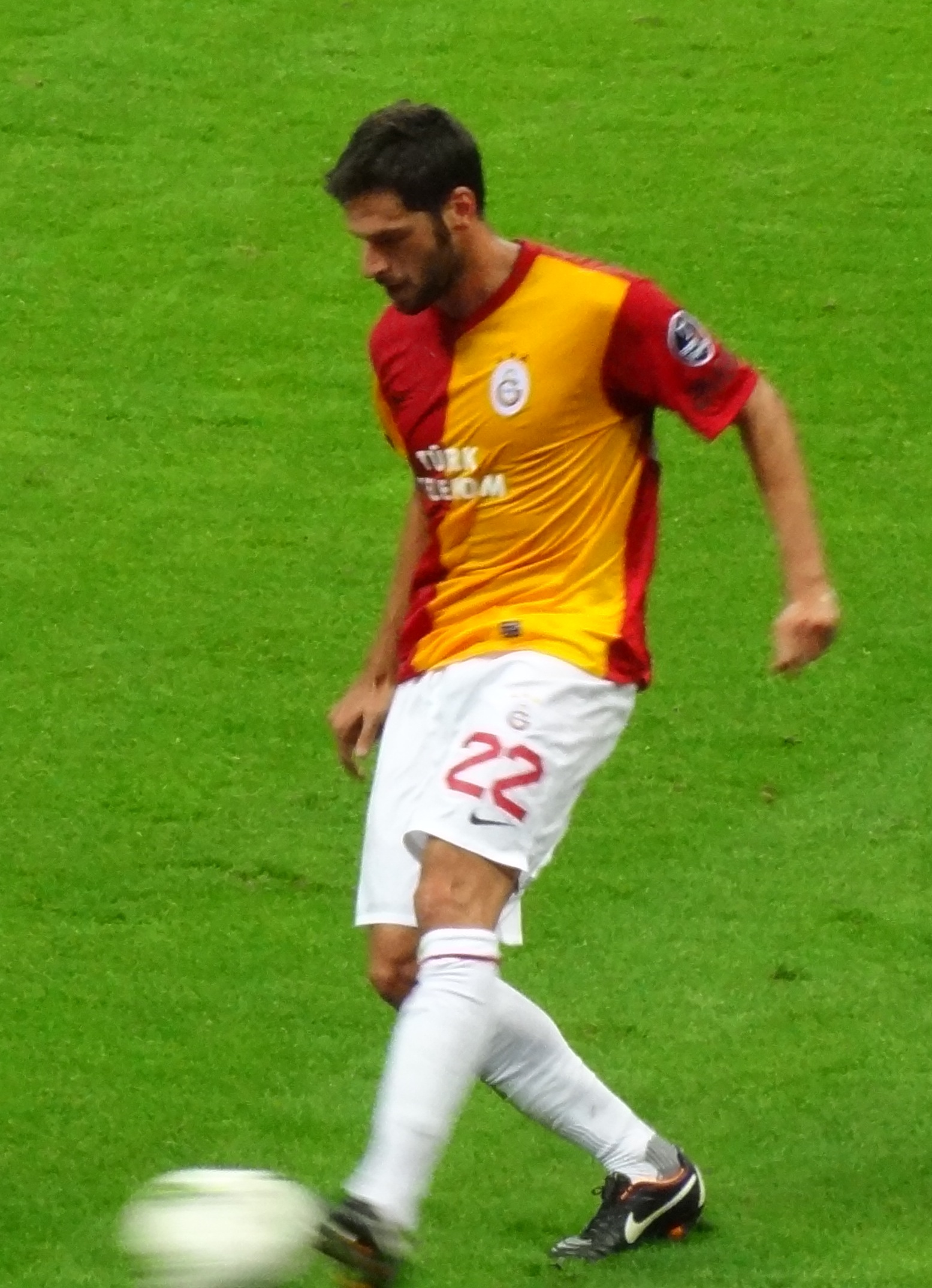
- Hakan Balta playing for Galatasaray in 2011

Personal information
- Full name: Hakan Kadir Balta
- Date of birth: 23 March 1983 (age 43)
- Place of birth: Berlin, West Germany
- Height: 1.84 m (6 ft 0 in)
- Positions: Centre back; left back

Youth career
- 2000–2003: Hertha BSC II

Senior career*
Years	Team	Apps	(Gls)
2003–2007	Manisaspor	116	(23)
2007–2018	Galatasaray	253	(11)

International career^{‡}
2006–2016	Turkey	50	(2)

Managerial career
- 2020–2022: Galatasaray (assistant)
- 2022–2025: Galatasaray U19
- 2025–: Turkey (assistant)
- * Club domestic league appearances and goals as of 21 May 2017 ‡ National team caps and goals as of 19 October 2015

Hakan Kadir Balta (Turkish pronunciation: [haːkan kadiɾ baɫta]; born 23 March 1983) is a retired Turkish professional footballer who played as a defender for Galatasaray in the Süper Lig. At the start of the 2018/19 season he was released from his contract after over 10 years with the club.

== Club career ==
=== Galatasaray ===
He formerly played for Hertha Berlin II and Manisaspor before moving to Galatasaray in September 2007. As part of the transfer deal Galatasaray exchanged Ferhat Öztorun and loaned Aydın Yılmaz, and Anıl Karaer. In the last game of the season he scored the goal that secured the title for Galatasaray and he won 2007–08 Süper Lig with Galatasaray.

==== 2010–11 season ====
He was criticised for the last minute error he made in the 2010–11 UEFA Europa League play-off match against FC Karpaty Lviv in August 2010 where Galatasaray was eliminated.

==== 2011–12 season ====
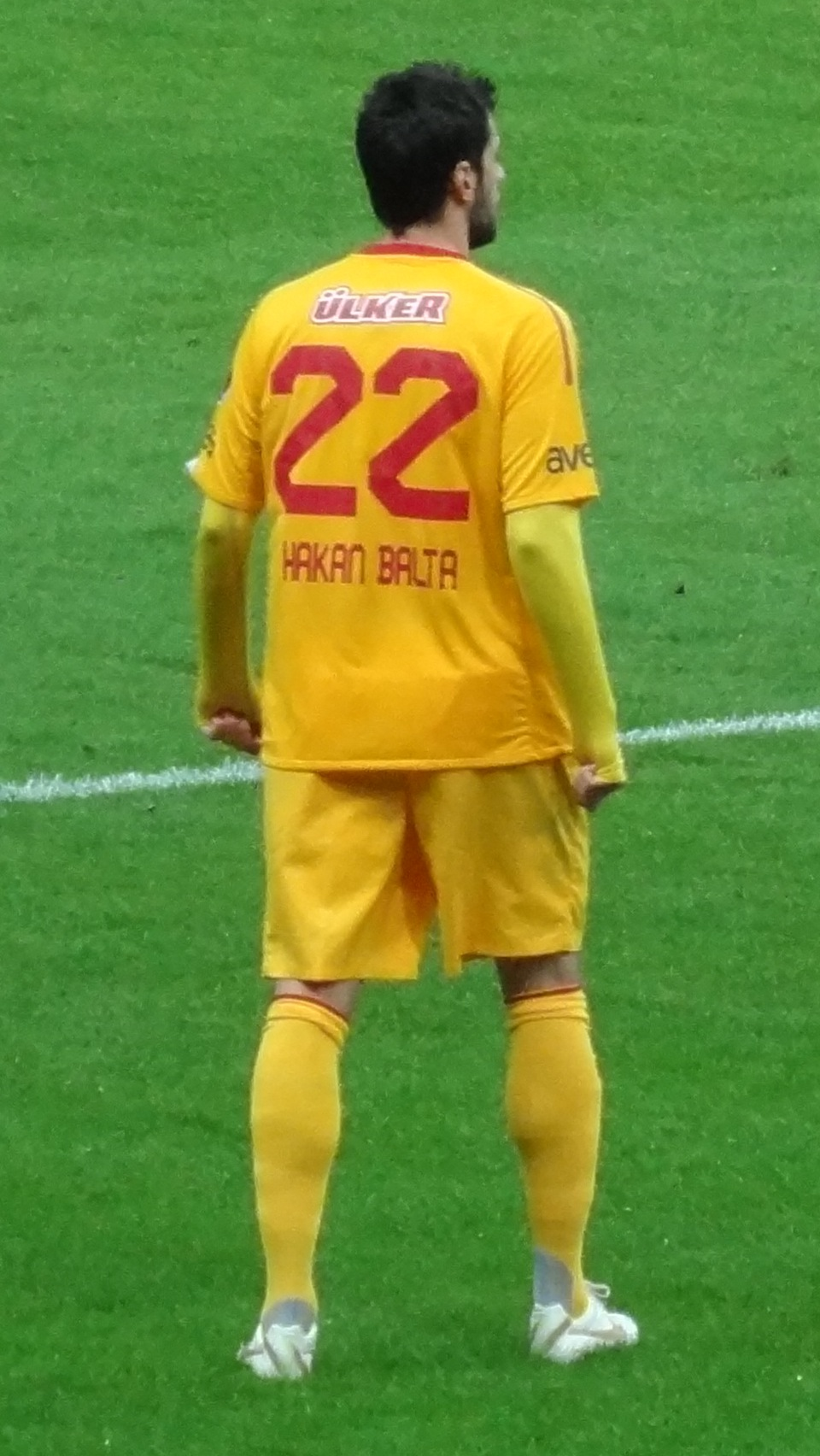
Hakan in a November 2011 match against Gaziantepspor

2011–12 Süper Lig was a year of recovery for Galatasaray. With a new board led by newly elected president Unal Aysal, the club assigned Fatih Terim as the manager. Hakan Balta improved his performance under Terim's management and alongside his new team members. He was regular starter through the season and the only member of the last season's crew to do so. In a derby against arch-rivals Fenerbahçe, Galatasaray were trailing 2–1 when Balta scored the equaliser with a left foot volley inside the area. The result helped maintain Galatasaray's position at the top of the league along. Galatasaray won the championship.

==== 2012–13 season ====
After Ayhan Akman leaving the team, Hakan became one of the team captains, and on 12 August during the 2012–13 Süper Lig match, he played as the captain as Galatasaray won the Super Cup against their rivals Fenerbahçe with a 3–2 win.

He scored his first 2012–13 Süper Lig goal of the new season on 19 October 2012, in a match against Gençlerbirliği when they were trailing 3–2 to make the final score 3–3 draw right before the final whistle.

== International career ==
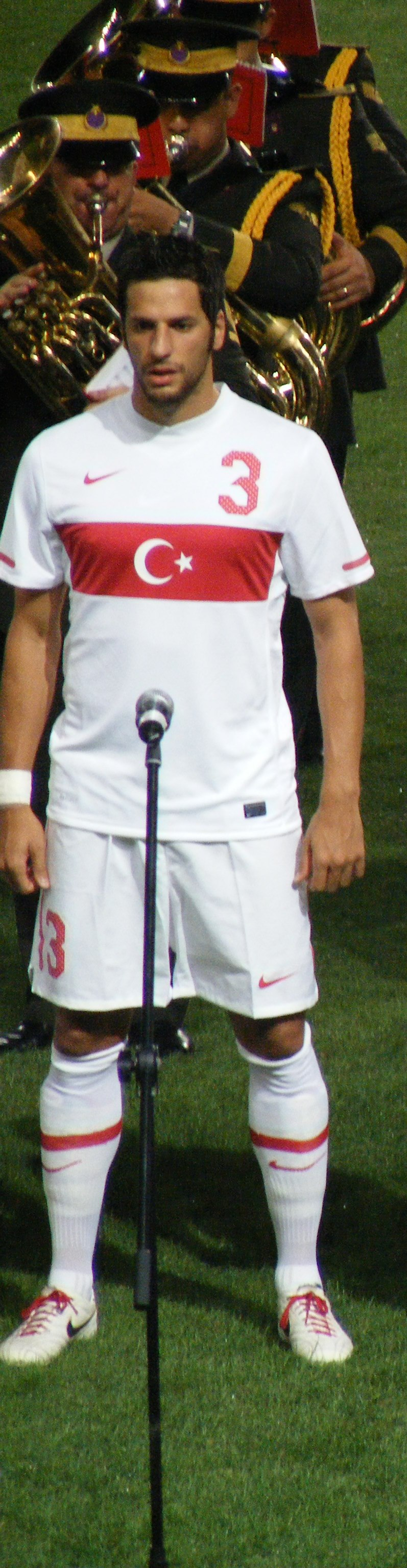
Hakan playing for Turkey in 2010

Having made his debut for the national side in the 1–1 friendly draw with Azerbaijan in April 2006, Hakan's services were not required again until a crucial point in the Euro 2008 qualifying campaign. He was called up to the Euro 2008 qualifiers against Norway and Bosnia-Herzegovina. He played the full 90 minutes of both victories, which secured Fatih Terim's side their place at Austria and Switzerland. He was a constant starter in all games during Turkey's run in Euro 2008. Turkey reached the semi-final stage with a streak of last-gasp wins. He continued to be a member of the first team also under Guus Hiddink management. He scored Turkey's consolation goal against Germany in a 3–1 defeat in UEFA Euro 2012 qualifying match.

== Managerial career ==
=== Galatasaray ===
Balta, who has been serving as the Assistant Administrative Director of the Football A Team as of 8 February 2022, has been appointed as the Technical Director of the Galatasaray Under-19 Football Team.

July 4, 2025, It was announced by Galatasaray that they parted ways with Balta, who has been the technical director of Galatasaray Under-19 Football Team for three years.

=== Turkey national football team ===
July 4, 2025, It was announced that he was the Turkish National Team Assistant Coach.

== Personal life ==
Balta has two sons, the older one Çağrı Balta who plays football for Fenerbahçe.

== Career statistics ==
As of 21 May 2017.

=== Club ===
Club	Season	League		Cup		League Cup		Europe		Total	
Club	Season	Apps	Goals	Apps	Goals	Apps	Goals	Apps	Goals	Apps	Goals
Manisaspor	2003–04	26	5	3	0	—		—		29	5
Manisaspor	2004–05	27	5	0	0	—		—		27	5
Manisaspor	2005–06	31	3	1	0	—		—		32	3
Manisaspor	2006–07	28	4	7	2	—		—		35	6
Manisaspor	2007–08	4	2	0	0	—		—		4	2
Manisaspor	Total	116	19	11	2	—		—		127	21
Galatasaray	2007–08	27	3	4	0	1	0	1	0	33	3
Galatasaray	2008–09	28	1	6	0	—		8	0	42	1
Galatasaray	2009–10	25	1	3	0	—		8	1	36	2
Galatasaray	2010–11	20	1	4	0	—		4	0	28	1
Galatasaray	2011–12	37	1	1	0	—		—		38	1
Galatasaray	2012–13	14	1	1	0	1	0	1	0	17	1
Galatasaray	2013–14	24	0	9	0	1	0	3	0	37	0
Galatasaray	2014–15	21	1	7	0	1	0	2	1	31	2
Galatasaray	2015–16	27	1	8	0	1	0	8	0	44	1
Galatasaray	2016–17	22	0	0	0	1	1	—		23	1
Galatasaray	Total	247	10	43	0	6	1	35	2	332	13
Career total		363	29	54	2	6	1	35	2	460	34

=== International ===
Turkey national team
Year	Apps	Goals
2006	1	0
2007	2	0
2008	14	1
2009	7	0
2010	3	0
2011	7	1
2012	0	0
2013	0	0
2014	3	0
2015	6	0
2016	7	0
Total	50	2

=== International goals ===
#	Date	Venue	Opponent	Score	Result	Competition
1.	20 May 2008	Bielefeld, Germany	Slovakia	1–0	1–0	Friendly
2.	7 October 2011	Istanbul, Turkey	Germany	1–2	1–3	UEFA Euro 2012 qualification

== Honours ==
Galatasaray

- Süper Lig: 2007–08, 2011–12, 2012–13, 2014–15, 2017–18
- Türkiye Kupası: 2013–14, 2014–15, 2015–16
- Süper Kupa: 2008, 2012, 2013, 2015, 2016

Turkey

- UEFA European Championship bronze medalist: 2008
