= Harry Kewell =

Australian soccer manager (born 1978)

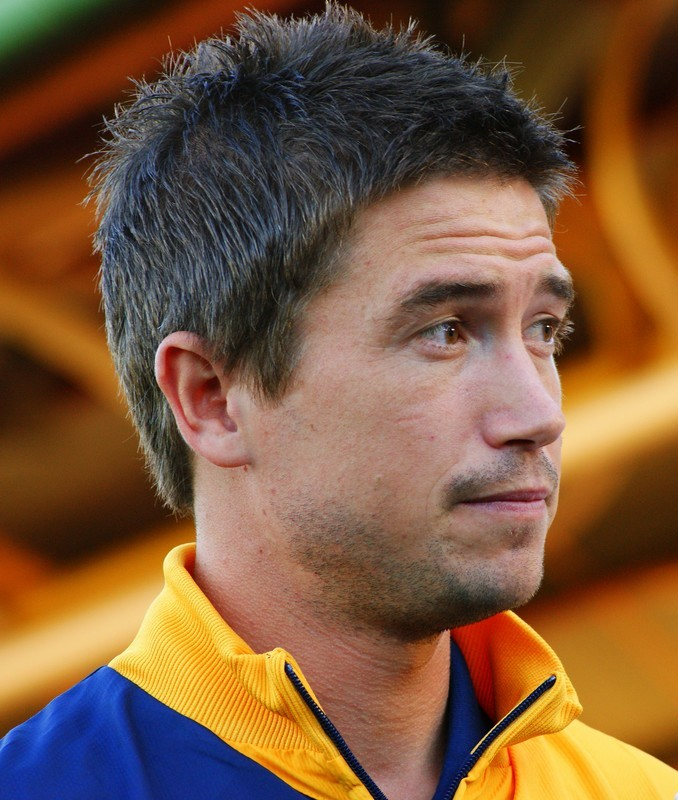
- Kewell in 2008

Personal information
- Full name: Harry Kewell
- Date of birth: 22 September 1978 (age 48)
- Place of birth: Sydney, New South Wales, Australia
- Height: 1.80 m (5 ft 11 in)
- Positions: Left winger; attacking midfielder; second striker

Team information
- Current team: Hanoi FC (manager)

Youth career
- Smithfield Hotspurs
- 1990–1993: Club Marconi
- 1993–1996: Leeds United

Senior career*
Years	Team	Apps	(Gls)
1996–2003	Leeds United	181	(45)
2003–2008	Liverpool	93	(12)
2008–2011	Galatasaray	63	(22)
2011–2012	Melbourne Victory	25	(8)
2013	Al-Gharafa	3	(1)
2013–2014	Melbourne Heart	16	(2)
Total		381	(90)

International career
1994–1995	Australia U17	10	(1)
1997	Australia U20	3	(0)
1996–2012	Australia	58	(17)

Managerial career
- 2017–2018: Crawley Town
- 2018: Notts County
- 2020–2021: Oldham Athletic
- 2021: Barnet
- 2023–2024: Yokohama F. Marinos
- 2025–: Hanoi FC
Medal record
Men's football
Representing Australia
AFC Asian Cup
Runner-up	2011 Qatar
OFC Nations Cup
Winner	2004 Australia
FIFA Confederations Cup
Runner-up	1997 Saudi Arabia
OFC U-20 Championship
Winner	1997 Tahiti
- * Club domestic league appearances and goals

Harry Kewell (born 22 September 1978) is an Australian soccer manager and former professional player who is currently the head coach of V.League 1 club Hanoi FC.

As a domestic player, Kewell represented Leeds United, Liverpool, Galatasaray, Melbourne Victory, Al-Gharafa, and Melbourne Heart. While at Leeds, he was named the PFA Young Player of the Year in 2000. Internationally, he received 58 caps and scored 17 goals while playing for Australia. A left winger also capable of playing as an attacking midfielder or second striker, he is often regarded by the media as "Australia's finest soccer export", despite his career being blighted by injury. In 2012, Kewell was named Australia's greatest soccer player in a vote by fans, players, and the media.

Kewell scored a crucial goal against Croatia that took Australia through to the knockout stages of the 2006 FIFA World Cup, only the Australian national team's second World Cup appearance. He is a member of the Executive Committee of the Australian Professional Footballers' Association. Kewell also holds a British passport through his father's heritage. Former Middlesbrough midfielder-turned-pundit Robbie Mustoe named Kewell as one of the greatest players he had faced but questioned his consistency and attitude following his initial injuries. Former German international Michael Ballack has also highlighted both Kewell's ability and his inconsistency.

Kewell represented Australia at the 1995 FIFA U-17 World Championship, the 1997 FIFA Confederations Cup (where Australia finished as runners-up), the 2004 OFC Nations Cup (which Australia claimed for the fourth time), the 2006 FIFA World Cup, the 2007 AFC Asian Cup, the 2010 FIFA World Cup, and the 2011 AFC Asian Cup (where Australia finished as runners-up).

Kewell is the only Australian man to have played in a UEFA Champions League final, featuring in the Liverpool squad that won the 2005 UEFA Champions League final.

== Early life ==
Harry Kewell was born on 22 September 1978 in Sydney, New South Wales, to an English father, Rod, and an Australian mother, Helen. Growing up, Kewell supported Liverpool in English football's First Division. He received his early education at Smithfield Public School and St. Johns Park High School before transferring to Westfield Sports High School. Before his teenage years, he played junior football for Smithfield Hotspurs (now Fairfield Hotspurs) before switching to Marconi Fairfield.

== Club career ==
=== Early career (1993) ===
At age 14, Kewell travelled to Thailand, Italy, and England with the successful Marconi under-14 team that had recently won the state titles. The team played matches against the junior team of Milan as well as apprenticeship sides in England. This was Kewell's first time out of the country, providing his first taste of football in Europe; he also attended a Premier League match for the first time as a spectator. At age 15, Kewell was offered the opportunity to travel back to England and trial with Premiership club Leeds United for a period of four weeks as part of the Big Brother Movement in Australia. Kewell travelled to England with his future Socceroo teammate Brett Emerton. Both were successful during their trials at Leeds; however, only Kewell was able to take up the club's offer due to his father's English heritage, which satisfied the visa requirements.

=== Leeds United (1993–2003) ===
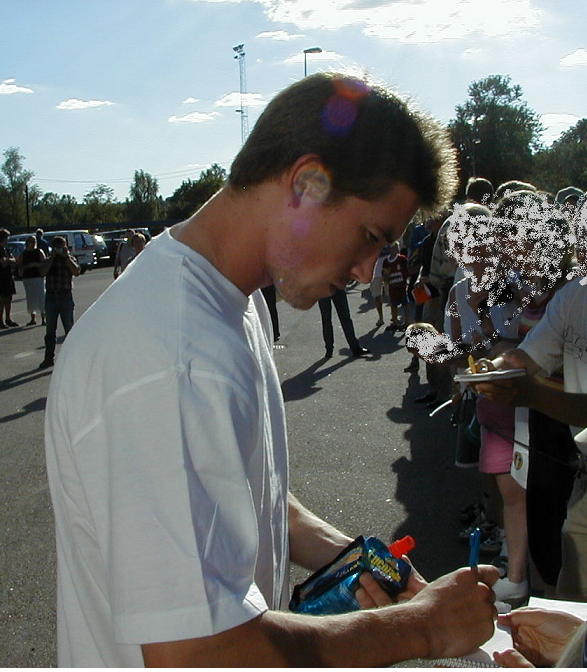
Kewell in 2001

Kewell played for three seasons in the Leeds United youth team. His first match for the youth squad was against Sunderland in 1995, and he scored his first hat-trick against Rotherham on 7 December 1996. Kewell made his first-team debut at age 17 in a 1–0 home defeat against Middlesbrough on 30 March 1996. In 1997, Kewell was part of the Leeds youth team that won the 1996–97 FA Youth Cup final in a 3–1 aggregate victory over Crystal Palace. His first senior goal for Leeds came in October 1997 during a 3–1 League Cup victory over Stoke City. Around that time, he was flatmates with Leeds goalkeeper Nicky Byrne, who later became a member of the boy band Westlife.

Kewell was sent off in the 1999–2000 UEFA Cup semi-final between Leeds United and Galatasaray. Playing mostly in a left-midfield role and in attack, Kewell emerged as a star among a group of highly promising youngsters, eventually playing alongside fellow Australian Mark Viduka.

Following his highly successful 1999–2000 season at Leeds, during which he won the PFA Young Player of the Year award and was selected for the PFA Team of the Year, Italian giants Internazionale bid £25 million for Kewell. Leeds rejected the offer, citing his value to the team. A high point of this period came when Kewell helped Leeds reach the semi-final of the 2000–01 UEFA Champions League. The club, however, began to suffer financial difficulties. By the 2002–03 season, Leeds had sold many of their best players, and Kewell's efforts in front of goal merely delayed the club's eventual relegation from the Premiership. His performances at Leeds gained him international recognition, and over eight years, he scored 45 goals in more than 180 appearances for the club.

Kewell left Leeds under acrimonious circumstances. In an interview with the BBC shortly before his move to Liverpool, Kewell strongly criticised the club's staff, stating that the medical team had exacerbated his injuries and that his teammates had ostracised him.

=== Liverpool (2003–2008) ===
Having rejected more financially enticing offers from Milan, Chelsea, Manchester United, Arsenal, and Barcelona, Kewell moved to the club he supported as a boy, Liverpool, for the start of the 2003–04 season. Kewell was handed the famous number seven shirt, surrendered by Vladimír Šmicer.

Kewell's transfer was controversial; in July 2003, former England captain Gary Lineker alleged in an article that a significant portion (£2 million of the £5 million fee) went to Kewell's unregistered agent, Bernie Mandic, to ensure he ended up at Anfield. Kewell subsequently sued Lineker in 2005 for defamation of character, but with the jury unable to agree on a verdict, the parties settled out of court.

Kewell made his debut for Liverpool in the opening game of the 2003–04 Premier League season, a 2–1 home loss to Chelsea on 17 August 2003. He scored his first goal for Liverpool in a 3–0 away win over great rivals Everton in the Merseyside derby with a powerful first-time strike. Kewell finished his first season at Anfield tied for second in scoring with Emile Heskey (seven goals), nine behind Michael Owen, Liverpool's top goalscorer for the 2003–04 Premier League season. Kewell also finished as Liverpool's top scorer in the 2003–04 UEFA Cup, netting against Olimpija Ljubljana, Steaua București, and Levski Sofia, bringing his season total to ten goals. Kewell's 2004–05 season started poorly; due to injury problems, he failed to score in his first 14 matches. He finally scored in round 15 of the Premier League during a 1–1 away draw against Aston Villa. It was his only Premier League goal of the season, marking one of his least productive campaigns. Despite his struggles, Kewell started and played in the 2005 League Cup final and the 2005 Champions League final.

On 25 May 2005, Kewell became the first Australian to win the UEFA Champions League, playing in Liverpool's penalty shoot-out victory over Milan in the final. (Craig Johnston, who was born in South Africa but raised in Australia, had previously won the predecessor tournament, the European Cup). Kewell was controversially selected by manager Rafael Benítez ahead of defensive midfielder Dietmar Hamann, signalling the club's intent to attack from the outset. The gamble proved unsuccessful, and an injured Kewell was substituted early in the first half with a torn abductor muscle. Liverpool were losing 1–0 at the time, and Kewell was booed off the pitch by Liverpool fans, many of whom suggested he had faked the injury. It emerged during the summer of 2005 that Kewell had played throughout the season with an undiagnosed sports hernia, also known as Gilmore's groin. His record as the only Australian to win a major UEFA tournament stood until 18 May 2022, when Ajdin Hrustic became the second Australian to win a UEFA competition courtesy of Eintracht Frankfurt's victory over Rangers F.C. in the 2022 UEFA Europa League final.

In November 2005, after recovering from the injury sustained during the final, Kewell spoke to the official Liverpool website, expressing a strong desire to repay his manager, Rafael Benítez, for showing confidence in him by fielding him in the Champions League final. He thanked his wife and friends for their support during his recovery. He also reiterated the severity of the injury that had forced him off in the final, stating that his doubters were misguided to question it.

Kewell's form in the 2005–06 FA Premier League season demonstrated his true capability, as he contributed numerous goals and assists. This supported his assertion that his prior struggles resulted from poor health rather than apathy. He scored his first league goal at Anfield in over two years when Liverpool beat Tottenham Hotspur 1–0 in January. He was also the lone scorer in a 1–0 home victory over Manchester City and added the final goal in a 3–1 win against derby rivals Everton less than a month later. Kewell was among Liverpool's best performers in their 2–1 FA Cup semi-final victory over Chelsea.

Kewell played in the 2006 FA Cup final, only to be substituted in the 48th minute due to abdominal pains (the supporters' reaction was much more sympathetic than it had been during the previous year's Champions League final). Liverpool later confirmed he had torn a groin muscle but expected him to be fit for the 2006 FIFA World Cup.

On 30 April 2007, Kewell made his comeback after almost a year out of club football. He came on as a 55th-minute substitute for Liverpool Reserves in a "mini-derby" against Everton Reserves. On 5 May 2007, he came on as a substitute in the second half of Liverpool's match against Fulham at Craven Cottage, having not played for the first team since his substitution in the 2006 FA Cup final. On 13 May 2007, Kewell came on as a substitute in the second half against Charlton Athletic in the last match of the Premier League season, where he scored his final goal for the club. Speculation about his selection for Liverpool's upcoming Champions League final in Athens became largely positive following his excellent performance against Charlton. He provided a cross for Dirk Kuyt to assist a Xabi Alonso goal and scored a penalty in the 90th minute. He played in the Champions League final in Athens, appearing as a second-half substitute for Boudewijn Zenden; however, Liverpool lost the final 2–1 to Milan.

Sidelined by yet another injury for the first month of the 2007–08 season, Kewell faced an uncertain future at Liverpool. He returned as a substitute in Liverpool's League Cup victory over Cardiff City on 31 October, coming on in the 71st minute. He then came on as a substitute in the Premier League and Champions League against Blackburn Rovers and Beşiktaş, respectively. Kewell delivered a strong performance in an impressive 4–0 away victory over Marseille, setting up goals for Fernando Torres and Dirk Kuyt to help secure qualification for the Champions League knockout phase. After his return, Liverpool manager Rafael Benítez stated on the club's website and to other media members that a new contract for Kewell to continue his career at Anfield was not out of the question. Many believed that if Kewell could stay injury-free until the season's end, he would be offered the chance to remain with the club.

Kewell struggled to break into the team following Liverpool's FA Cup defeat to Barnsley. His chances of securing a new contract were further hindered when, in search of match fitness, he travelled to play for his national team against Singapore. He returned to England with a groin strain, leaving him less time to prove himself worthy of a new deal. His first goal of the 2007–08 season was for the Liverpool reserve team in their 2–0 win over rivals Manchester United. Because of his injuries, his future at Liverpool was uncertain. In May 2008, Liverpool revealed they would not offer Kewell a new contract.

=== Galatasaray (2008–2011) ===
On 5 July 2008, reigning Turkish Süper Lig champions Galatasaray signed Kewell to a two-year contract, presenting him with the number 19 shirt.

Upon signing, Kewell said, "I wanted to move on and this is the best way. I can't wait to get started, it's just what I'm looking forward to, a new challenge." His transfer to Galatasaray provoked strong criticism from fans and teammates of his former club, Leeds United, as he had been a Leeds player when two of their fans were murdered in attacks before a UEFA Cup semi-final against Galatasaray in Istanbul in April 2000. Kewell responded in an open letter, stating, "I chose the No 19 shirt when I signed for Galatasaray SK as a sign of respect for Leeds because that was the number I got when I first became a regular member of the Leeds United starting XI. I felt that it might be a way to demonstrate that I had not forgotten where it all started and I was hoping that in a small way it would help the healing process of the tragedy that occurred on 5 April 2000. To blame the Galatasaray club for the tragedy in Istanbul is simply wrong and discriminatory."

Kewell made his debut for Galatasaray in the Turkish Super Cup, where he came on as a 66th-minute substitute. Just 20 seconds later, he scored his first goal for Galatasaray with his first touch in a 2–1 win over Kayserispor, later providing the assist for the second goal. His second goal for the club came in the first league match of the season against Denizlispor, which Galatasaray won 4–1. On 23 October 2008, Kewell scored the only goal in Galatasaray's UEFA Cup win over Olympiacos. One week later, Kewell played in Galatasaray's first Turkish Cup match, a 1–1 draw with Ankaraspor.

On 2 November 2008, Kewell scored his fourth league goal in Galatasaray's home win over Gaziantepspor, after a week of overwhelming speculation in the Turkish media regarding an injury. Following medical consultations in Australia, it was announced on 12 December 2008 that Kewell would need surgery to repair an inguinal hernia, and the operation took place on 15 December 2008. Of the nine matches that Kewell had scored in before his injury, Galatasaray had won them all, including two UEFA Cup matches, six Süper Lig matches, and a Turkish Super Cup match.

In a UEFA Cup round of 32 match against Bordeaux, Kewell scored from 35 metres out, bringing the score to 2–1. Galatasaray won the match and advanced to the round of 16. On 12 March 2009, during the UEFA Cup round of 16 match against Hamburger SV, Kewell had to play as a centre-back for 40 minutes after the sending off of teammate Emre Aşık, but managed to fulfill the role adequately despite playing out of position. In the second leg of the round of 16 clash, he again played as a centre-back, scoring a penalty while doing so.

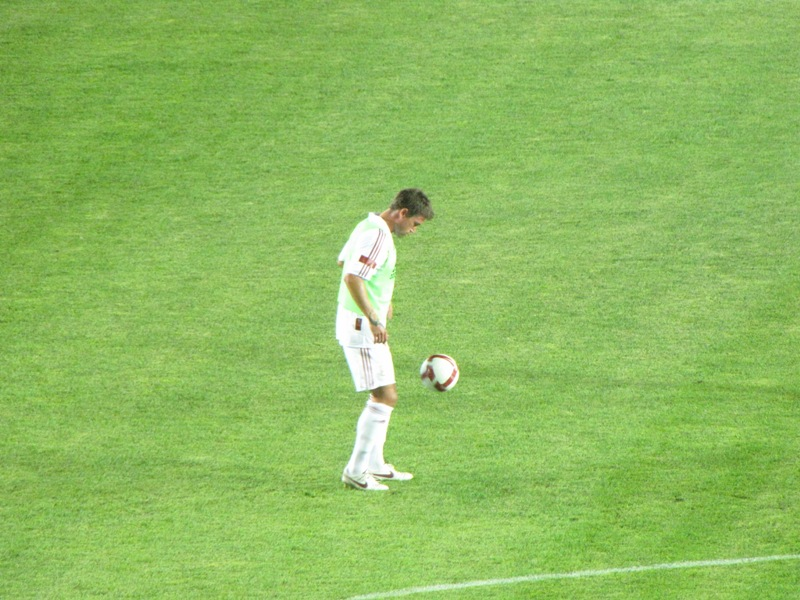
Kewell warming up before a match with Galatasaray in July 2009

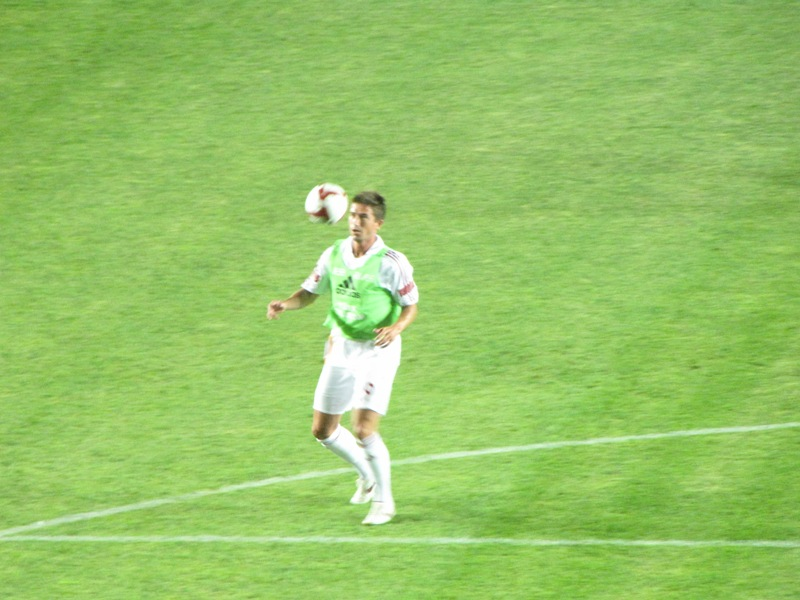
Kewell warming up before a match with Galatasaray in July 2009

In the 2009–10 season, Kewell scored 14 goals in 28 matches in all competitions. He netted 9 times in 17 league appearances, playing as the main striker in most matches due to an injury to Milan Baroš. In a 2009–10 Turkish Cup play-off, Kewell scored in a 2–1 win against Bucaspor on 28 October 2009 to put the side into the group stage of the tournament. Finishing on top of their group, Galatasaray were eliminated at the quarter-final stage by Antalyaspor. During the 2009–10 UEFA Europa League qualifying rounds, Kewell scored Galatasaray's second goal in a 4–1 away win against Israeli club Maccabi Netanya on 30 July 2009. Kewell then scored in a 5–0 win against Estonia's Levadia Tallinn on 20 August 2009. Galatasaray qualified for the group stage. On 22 October 2009, Kewell scored in a 4–1 win over Dinamo București in Istanbul. In the return leg on 5 November 2009, he scored after 22 minutes in an eventual 3–0 Galatasaray victory. Galatasaray faced Atlético Madrid in the 2009–10 UEFA Europa League knockout phase where they lost 3–2 on aggregate to the eventual champions.

On 15 August 2009, Kewell scored two penalties in a 4–1 home win over Denizlispor. Almost two weeks later, on 31 August, he scored a goal after 74 minutes in a 2–0 away win over Ankaraspor on matchday 4 of the Süper Lig season. Kewell scored his fourth goal of the campaign in a 4–3 win over Trabzonspor on 18 October. Two weeks later, he scored in a 2–0 home win over Sivasspor on 1 November. By matchday 13, Kewell scored his sixth goal of the domestic season in a 1–1 draw with Manisaspor on 22 November. Two weeks later, on 6 December, he scored after 56 minutes in a 1–1 draw with İstanbul BŞB. Just five days later, in an away game against Antalyaspor, the game was locked at 2–2 until the 67th minute, when Kewell broke the deadlock to secure a 3–2 victory for Galatasaray. On 19 December, Kewell scored his ninth and final goal of the 2009–10 season in a 1–0 win over Gençlerbirliği, netting in the 77th minute. In January, fellow Socceroo teammate and captain Lucas Neill joined Kewell at Galatasaray after transferring from Everton. Under coach Frank Rijkaard, Galatasaray finished third in the 2009–10 Süper Lig table, thereby qualifying for the 2010–11 Europa League third qualifying round, as Kewell's contract with Galatasaray expired after the 2009–10 season.

On 16 July 2010, it was revealed that Kewell had rejected an approach from A-League side Gold Coast United in favour of staying in Europe. Galatasaray offered a new one-year contract, but it is believed that Kewell preferred a longer-term contract. On 19 July 2010, Galatasaray announced via its official website that the parties had agreed to a one-year extension of Kewell's contract. On 21 July, the details of Kewell's contract were revealed: he would receive a lump sum fee of €1.8 million and a salary of €30,000 per match. It was also revealed that Kewell would wear number 99 for the 2010–11 season. Kewell scored his first goal of the 2010–11 season in a 1–0 win against Gaziantepspor on 14 September 2010. Kewell scored his second goal of the season against Beşiktaş in a 2–1 loss on 29 November; having been down 2–0, Kewell scored for Galatasaray in the 90th minute. Kewell opened the scoring after 27 minutes as Galatasaray beat Kasımpaşa 3–0 on 5 December 2010.

On 7 February 2011, Kewell scored Galatasaray's third goal in a 4–2 win against Eskişehirspor; he was substituted in the 63rd minute for Milan Baroš, who subsequently scored Galatasaray's fourth goal. Following a solid but not sensational season at Galatasaray, there had been continual speculation that Kewell could be heading back home to Australia, with the Newcastle Jets reportedly keen on signing him. The interest in the Socceroo coincided with Nathan Tinkler buying out the Novocastrian club in late 2010. Kewell scored his last goal for Galatasaray in a 3–2 away win against Gençlerbirliği on 15 May 2011. On 19 May 2011, Kewell's wife, Sheree Murphy, posted on Twitter that Harry would play his last game for Galatasaray against Konyaspor because no contract had been offered to him. Galatasaray finished in eighth spot on the Süper Lig table with 46 points, as Kewell scored 5 goals in 20 appearances for the 2010–11 season.

Kewell was a fan favourite among Galatasaray supporters; his working discipline and dignified personality were appreciated by his teammates and board members alike. He was described as fully professional with a charming character, always smiling and dedicated to his family. His nicknames at Galatasaray were "Büyücü Harry", meaning "Harry the Wizard" (inspired by Harry Potter), and the "Wizard of Oz" (Turkish: "Oz Büyücüsü").

=== Melbourne Victory (2011–2012) ===
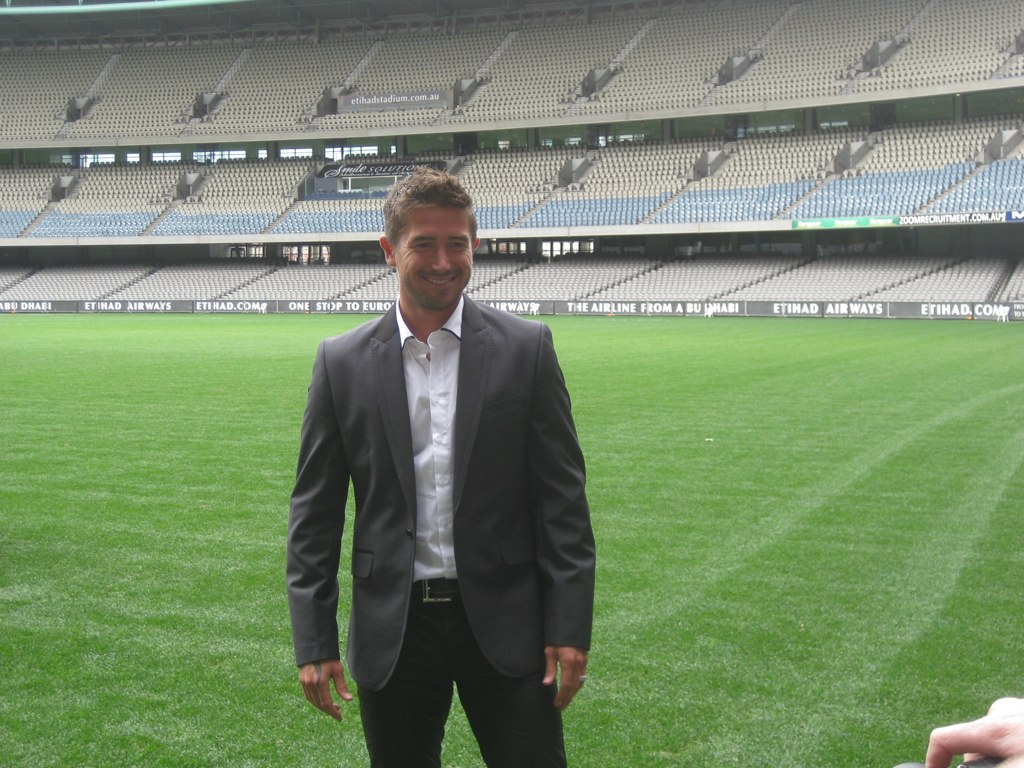
Kewell being unveiled as Melbourne Victory's new signing in 2011

On 20 August 2011, it was announced Kewell had signed a three-year contract with A-League club Melbourne Victory. Melbourne was hyped up with "Kewell Fever," with many hundreds of fans welcoming him at Melbourne Airport and over two thousand fans attending AAMI Park, where he was given his number 22 jersey by chairman Anthony Di Pietro. Kewell played his first friendly against Adelaide United on 23 August at Hindmarsh Stadium, being substituted at half-time. Coach Mehmet Durakovic rated his performance as "phenomenal" and went on to say, "Harry's really a professional footballer, and should be ready for 8 October."

Kewell made his first appearance in the 2011–12 A-League season in a 0–0 draw against Sydney FC on 8 October in front of an attendance of 40,000 at Etihad Stadium. Kewell scored his first goal for the Victory from a penalty against Gold Coast United on 26 November 2011 at AAMI Park, Melbourne, after teammate Archie Thompson was brought down in the box in the first minute. On 31 December 2011, at Suncorp Stadium in Brisbane, Kewell scored his second goal in the fourth minute from a powerful shot outside the box. After a slow start to his debut A-League season, he started to get his talented form back, resulting in a few best-on-ground performances. His fourth goal came from a free-kick just outside the box against Gold Coast United in Launceston, Tasmania, on 1 February 2012. His goal, however, was not enough to seal the match, as Melbourne conceded a late goal in the last minute from Gold Coast's Michael Thwaite, resulting in a 1–1 draw.

Kewell scored his fifth goal against Central Coast Mariners on 10 February from a powerful volley in the box, helping Melbourne secure a crucial 2–1 win over the league leaders. The victory gave Melbourne hope of making the finals with six matches remaining. On 18 February, Kewell scored two goals at Suncorp Stadium to give Melbourne hope of a result against Brisbane Roar in a closely fought 3–2 loss. He was substituted in the 77th minute, after which Victory created fewer scoring opportunities. He scored three goals in two matches at Suncorp Stadium that season. Kewell did not continue with the club after his first season and returned to Europe to be closer to his mother-in-law as she battled cancer.

=== Al-Gharafa (2013) ===
On 6 April 2013, Kewell signed for Al-Gharafa in the Qatar Stars League for the remainder of the 2012–13 season as an injury replacement for fellow Australian Mark Bresciano. Kewell made his debut on 7 April as a substitute against Al Sadd. Kewell concluded his brief stint in Qatar with a goal in his third and final game against Qatar SC on 18 April. With his contractual commitments to Al-Garafa completed, Kewell was seen back in Melbourne around 48 hours later, with his future career uncertain.

=== Melbourne Heart (2013–2014) ===
In June 2013, it was announced that Kewell would play for Melbourne Heart in the 2013–14 A-League season. Following the first match of the season against Melbourne Victory, Kewell was diagnosed with whiplash, ruling him out for three weeks. In training for his matchday 5 return, Kewell suffered an ankle injury. On 26 March 2014, it was announced that Kewell would retire from professional football at the end of the A-League season. His last match was on 12 April 2014 against Western Sydney Wanderers.

On 19 October 2016, it was announced that Kewell had been chosen as the recipient of the Alex Tobin Medal, Australia's most prestigious football honour, for his achievements during the course of his career.

== International career ==
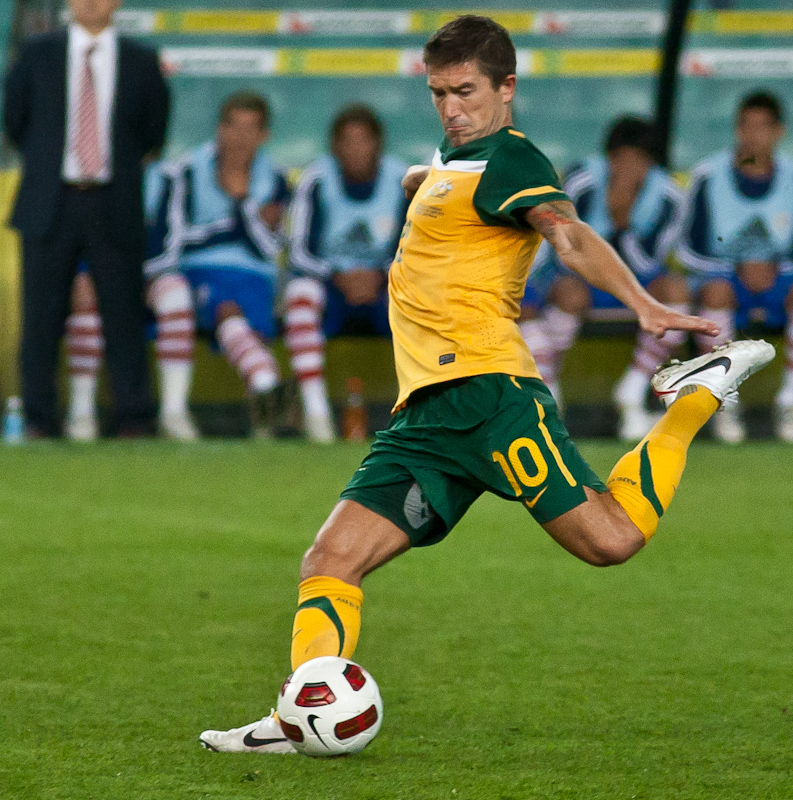
Kewell playing for Australia

Kewell became the third youngest player to debut for the Australia national team when he played against Chile on 24 April 1996, aged 17 years and 7 months.

=== 1998 FIFA World Cup ===
==== Qualification ====
In November 1997, Kewell was selected to play for Australia in the 1998 FIFA World Cup qualifying match against Iran. At the Azadi Stadium in Tehran, in front of an estimated crowd of 100,000, Kewell scored his first goal for his country, giving Australia a 1–0 lead. Iran eventually drew level, and the game resulted in a 1–1 draw, which set up a tense return game in Melbourne.

A then-record crowd for a football match in Australia of 85,513 at the Melbourne Cricket Ground witnessed the second leg of the World Cup qualifier against Iran, and Kewell's second international goal. The Socceroos eventually stretched their lead to 2–0, but Iran fought back to draw 2–2, qualifying for the 1998 World Cup in France on away goals.

=== 1997 FIFA Confederations Cup ===
A few months after failing to qualify for the World Cup, Kewell joined Australia as it competed in the 1997 FIFA Confederations Cup. After advancing past the group stage, Australia faced Uruguay in the semi-final. Kewell scored a golden goal two minutes into extra time, giving Australia a 1–0 victory. Australia then faced Brazil in the final, losing 6–0.

=== 2002 FIFA World Cup ===
==== Qualification ====
Kewell joined Australia as they faced Uruguay in both legs of the 2002 FIFA World Cup qualification (OFC–CONMEBOL play-off). In the first leg in Melbourne, Australia beat Uruguay 1–0. However, Uruguay won 3–0 in Montevideo. This meant Kewell and Australia spent another World Cup on the sidelines.

=== 2003 ===
In February 2003, Australia made headlines by upsetting England. Kewell scored Australia's second goal in a match that ended 3–1. Later that year, Kewell once again added to his goal-scoring record against Jamaica in a 2–1 win.

=== 2004 OFC Nations Cup ===
Kewell played in the second leg of the 2004 OFC Nations Cup final against the Solomon Islands, scoring in the 8th minute. Australia won the leg 5–0, securing an 11–1 aggregate victory.

=== 2006 FIFA World Cup ===
==== Qualification ====
On 16 November 2005, Australia qualified for the 2006 World Cup after they defeated Uruguay. It was the first time Australia had qualified for the World Cup since 1974, when it was held in West Germany. Kewell was considered instrumental in the Socceroos' defeat of Uruguay, turning the course of the match after he came on as a substitute. Half an hour into the match, a flicked pass on the left wing from Mark Viduka opened up a chance for Kewell, who scuffed his kick. However, the ball fell perfectly for Mark Bresciano, who scored the equalizer. Kewell also scored the first penalty for Australia in the deciding penalty shoot-out, which they went on to win 4–2.

==== Finals ====
Kewell played in Australia's opening game of the 2006 World Cup against Japan in Kaiserslautern. He did not start for Australia in their second group match against Brazil, but again came on as a substitute, missing an early opportunity when Brazilian goalkeeper Dida punched the ball out dangerously. Kewell was reported to FIFA by referee Markus Merk for verbal abuse after the match, but he escaped sanction.

Kewell scored Australia's second goal in the 79th minute against Croatia to equalize at 2–2 and help Australia qualify for the round of 16 for the first time. He was also awarded Man of the Match for his performance, which made him the second Australian to win the Man of the Match award at a World Cup after Tim Cahill who had won the award earlier in the tournament for his performance against Japan. Due to suspected gout, (later diagnosed as septic arthritis, a bacterial infection in the joints of his left foot), Kewell was unable to play against Italy in the round of 16; Australia was eliminated after a 1–0 loss.

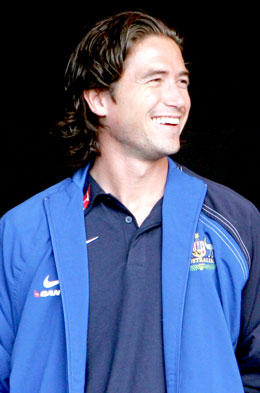
Kewell at an award presentation after the 2007 Asian Cup

=== 2007 AFC Asian Cup ===
Kewell did not play for the national team for a year following the World Cup. He made his comeback in a friendly against Singapore on 30 June 2007. The match was Australia's last before the 2007 Asian Cup; Kewell came on as a 65th-minute substitute, scoring his eighth international goal and providing a cross for the final goal in a 3–0 victory. Kewell was a key part of the Australian squad for their first Asian Cup. Kewell scored his ninth international goal for Australia in a 4–0 win over Thailand in the Asian Cup. In the quarter-final against Japan, Kewell replaced Mark Viduka in the 61st minute of a 1–1 draw. A penalty shoot-out was required to break the deadlock, and Kewell's opening penalty for Australia was saved. Australia lost the shoot-out and was eliminated.

=== 2010 FIFA World Cup ===
==== Qualification ====
Kewell missed Australia's first two matches against Qatar and China. Kewell was made captain for Australia's qualifier against Iraq at Suncorp Stadium on 1 June 2008. He scored the only goal with a header in the 47th minute as Australia won 1–0. Kewell also scored the third goal against Qatar in Australia's 3–1 win to put them into the final qualification round. In a World Cup qualifier warm-up match against the Netherlands, he scored a penalty won by Joshua Kennedy. Australia won 2–1, with Kewell playing a vital role in the first half. Australia then played Uzbekistan, winning 2–0 with Kewell scoring a penalty.

==== Finals ====
Kewell did not play in Australia's opening game of the 2010 World Cup in South Africa, a 4–0 loss to Germany. After the loss, Kewell said that the morale of the team remained high, ahead of a clash against Ghana. During the match against Ghana on 19 June, Kewell was sent off for blocking a goal by handling the ball. Standing on the goal line, Kewell attempted to block the ball from entering the goal net with his chest; however, the ball ricocheted off his arm. He received a straight red card for the offence in the 24th minute. Asamoah Gyan went on to score the resulting penalty, and the match ended 1–1, severely damaging Australia's hopes of progressing past the group stage. This was the 150th red card issued in a World Cup match. Kewell denied rumours that he was behind a supposed rift in the Socceroos camp. After the match, Kewell said that he was devastated by the decision made by referee Roberto Rosetti and felt that the red card "killed" his World Cup dream.

=== 2011 AFC Asian Cup ===
Kewell started in all of the Socceroos' matches in the 2011 AFC Asian Cup, scoring three times for the Green and Gold in the Qatar-based tournament. His first goal came in Australia's first match, against India, with a left-footed shot from outside the penalty area. Kewell's second goal came in Australia's quarter-final match against Iraq with a header in the 118th minute of extra time, giving Australia a 1–0 win and sending them to the semi-finals of the Asian Cup for the first time. Kewell continued his fine form in the semi-final against Uzbekistan by opening the scoring in the first five minutes, helping his side to a 6–0 win and progress to the final, where they were beaten 1–0 by Japan.

=== 2014 FIFA World Cup qualifiers ===
In February 2012, Kewell scored his last goal for Australia in a 4–2 win over Saudi Arabia in Melbourne. On 8 June 2012, Kewell played his final game for Australia in a scoreless draw against Oman.

== Management career ==
Following his retirement, Kewell worked with junior players through his academy in Australia for a few months, and in 2015 he successfully completed his UEFA B and A licences.

=== Watford ===
On 23 July 2015, Kewell was appointed head coach of the Watford Under-21 team. On 10 August 2015, Kewell coached his first game for the club, ending in a 0–0 draw at Sheffield Wednesday.

=== Crawley Town ===
On 23 May 2017, Kewell was appointed head coach of League Two club Crawley Town, becoming the first Australian to coach a professional English side. Warren Feeney was appointed assistant manager to Kewell. Kewell's managerial debut on 5 August was a 3–1 home loss to Port Vale. Kewell guided Crawley Town to a 14th-place finish in League Two, with his most successful spell consisting of 10 wins in 14 league games between 9 December 2017 and 17 February 2018. Six games into the 2018–19 season, with Crawley sitting 14th in League Two, Kewell left to take over at Notts County.

=== Notts County ===
On 31 August 2018, Kewell was appointed manager of fellow League Two club Notts County. Officially announced three days later, he became the club's fifteenth permanent manager in 10 years, inheriting a team sitting at the bottom of the league. On 13 November 2018, he was dismissed after 11 league games in charge; he had won three, leaving the team in 22nd place, just above the relegation zone.

=== Oldham Athletic ===
On 1 August 2020, Kewell was appointed as manager of Oldham Athletic on a one-year contract with the option to extend for a further year. He became their fifth manager in 12 months. He oversaw a poor first full month in charge, with the side going six games without a victory in October, later achieving a record of 11 wins, 6 draws, and 15 defeats for a 32% win rate.

On 7 March 2021, it was announced by Oldham Athletic that Kewell and his assistant, Alan Maybury, had been relieved of their duties. Kewell left Oldham in 16th place in League Two, a higher position than they had finished the previous season.

=== Barnet ===
On 10 June 2021, Kewell was appointed the new head coach of Barnet in the National League, becoming the club's 26th manager in 10 seasons. In his debut on 21 August, his side lost 5–0 at home to his former club Notts County. He was dismissed on 20 September, having lost five and drawn two of his seven games.

=== Celtic ===
On 18 June 2022, Kewell joined Scottish Premiership title holders Celtic as a first-team coach, under compatriot manager Ange Postecoglou. Kewell remained in the role for the first few months of the 2023–24 season after Postecoglou was replaced by Brendan Rodgers.

=== Yokohama F. Marinos ===
On 31 December 2023, Kewell was announced as head coach of Yokohama F. Marinos. He led the club to the 2024 AFC Champions League final, losing 3–6 on aggregate to Al-Ain FC. On 16 July 2024, he was dismissed after less than seven months in the role.

=== Hanoi FC ===
After a year without management, it was announced on 4 October 2025 that Kewell was appointed as the head coach of V.League 1 club Hanoi FC, while the club was standing at top 6 in the league. His appointment was reported worldwide, drawing a mixed reception from the media. Talking about the club, he revealed that it was willing to listen and improve the training conditions to meet his standards, which he previously described as concerning.

His first match in charge took place on 18 October 2025, resulting in a 2–1 loss to Ninh Binh FC. He secured his first win for the club in the following match, a 3–2 victory against Becamex Ho Chi Minh City. After drawing 1-1 with Cong An Ho Chi Minh City in the final round of 2025-26 V.League, Hanoi FC finished fourth in the league, dropped out of top 3 for the first time after 17 years.

== Personal life ==
Kewell was born in Smithfield, Sydney. He is married to English soap actress Sheree Murphy, whom he met at the Majestyk nightclub in Leeds in 2000. The couple married in Las Vegas, Nevada, on 25 May 2002, and have four children.

In May 2008, Kewell became the face of Australian men's fashion brand Politix. Having grown up in Smithfield in Sydney's west, he advocated for the introduction of the Western Sydney A-League expansion team, Sydney Rovers. He is also a supporter of the Canterbury-Bankstown Bulldogs of the National Rugby League.

== Career statistics ==
=== Club ===
Appearances and goals by club, season and competition
Club	Season	League			National cup (Note: Includes FA Cup, Turkish Cup)		League cup (Note: Includes Football League Cup)		Continental		Other		Total	
Club	Season	Division	Apps	Goals	Apps	Goals	Apps	Goals	Apps	Goals	Apps	Goals	Apps	Goals
Leeds United	1995–96	Premier League	2	0	—		—		—		—		2	0
Leeds United	1996–97	Premier League	1	0	—		—		—		—		1	0
Leeds United	1997–98	Premier League	29	5	4	2	2	1	—		—		35	8
Leeds United	1998–99	Premier League	38	6	5	1	2	2	4 (Note: Appearances in UEFA Cup)	0	—		49	9
Leeds United	1999–2000	Premier League	36	10	3	2	2	0	12	5	—		53	17
Leeds United	2000–01	Premier League	17	2	0	0	0	0	9 (Note: Appearances in UEFA Champions League)	0	—		26	2
Leeds United	2001–02	Premier League	27	8	0	0	1	1	7	2	—		35	11
Leeds United	2002–03	Premier League	31	14	4	1	1	0	5	1	—		41	16
Leeds United	Total		181	45	16	6	8	4	37	8	—		242	63
Liverpool	2003–04	Premier League	36	7	3	0	2	1	8	3	—		49	11
Liverpool	2004–05	Premier League	18	1	0	0	1	0	12	0	—		31	1
Liverpool	2005–06	Premier League	27	3	6	0	1	0	6	0	1 (Note: Appearance in FIFA Club World Cup)	0	41	3
Liverpool	2006–07	Premier League	2	1	0	0	0	0	1	0	0	0	3	1
Liverpool	2007–08	Premier League	10	0	1	0	1	0	3	0	—		15	0
Liverpool	Total		93	12	10	0	5	1	30	3	1	0	139	16
Galatasaray	2008–09	Süper Lig	26	8	1	0	—		9 (Note: One appearance in UEFA Champions League, eight appearances and four goals in UEFA Cup)	4	1 (Note: Appearance in Turkish Super Cup)	1	37	13
Galatasaray	2009–10	Süper Lig	17	9	2	1	—		9 (Note: Appearances in UEFA Europa League)	4	—		28	14
Galatasaray	2010–11	Süper Lig	20	5	3	0	—		3	2	—		26	7
Galatasaray	Total		63	22	6	1	—		21	10	1	1	91	34
Melbourne Victory	2011–12	A-League	25	8	—		—		—		—		25	8
Al-Gharafa	2012–13	QSL	3	1	—		—		—		—		3	1
Melbourne Heart	2013–14	A-League	16	2	—		—		—		—		16	2
Career total			381	90	32	7	13	5	88	21	2	1	516	124

=== International ===
Appearances and goals by national team and year
National team	Year	Apps	Goals
Australia	1996	2	0
Australia	1997	6	3
Australia	2000	1	0
Australia	2001	3	0
Australia	2003	2	2
Australia	2004	3	1
Australia	2005	2	0
Australia	2006	4	1
Australia	2007	6	2
Australia	2008	9	3
Australia	2009	7	1
Australia	2010	2	0
Australia	2011	8	3
Australia	2012	3	1
Total		58	17

Scores and results list Australia's goal tally first; score column indicates score after each Kewell goal.

List of international goals scored by Harry Kewell
No.	Date	Venue	Opponent	Score	Result	Competition
1	22 November 1997	Tehran, Iran	Iran	1–0	1–1	1998 FIFA World Cup qualification
2	29 November 1997	Melbourne, Australia	Iran	1–0	2–2	1998 FIFA World Cup qualification
3	19 December 1997	Riyadh, Saudi Arabia	Uruguay	1–0	1–0	1997 FIFA Confederations Cup
4	12 February 2003	London, England	England		3–1	Friendly
5	7 September 2003	Reading, England	Jamaica		2–1	Friendly
6	12 October 2004	Sydney	Solomon Islands		6–0	2004 OFC Nations Cup
7	22 June 2006	Stuttgart, Germany	Croatia		2–2	2006 FIFA World Cup
8	30 June 2007	Kallang, Singapore	Singapore		3–0	Friendly
9	16 July 2007	Bangkok, Thailand	Thailand		4–0	2007 AFC Asian Cup
10	1 June 2008	Brisbane, Australia	Iraq	1–0	1–0	2010 FIFA World Cup qualification
11	15 June 2008	Doha, Qatar	Qatar		3–1	2010 FIFA World Cup qualification
12	6 September 2008	Eindhoven, Netherlands	Netherlands		2–1	Friendly
13	1 April 2009	Sydney, Australia	Uzbekistan		2–0	2010 FIFA World Cup qualification
14	11 January 2011	Al Rayyan, Qatar	India	2–0	4–0	2011 AFC Asian Cup
15	22 January 2011	Al Rayyan, Qatar	Iraq	1–0	1–0	2011 AFC Asian Cup
16	25 January 2011	Al Rayyan, Qatar	Uzbekistan	1–0	6–0	2011 AFC Asian Cup
17	29 February 2012	Melbourne, Australia	Saudi Arabia	2–2	4–2	2014 FIFA World Cup qualification

== Managerial statistics ==
As of match played 18 October 2026

Managerial record by team and tenure
Team	From	To	Record					Ref.
Team	From	To	P	W	D	L	Win %	Ref.
Crawley Town	23 May 2017	31 August 2018	57	18	12	27	31.58	
Notts County	31 August 2018	13 November 2018	15	3	4	8	20.00	
Oldham Athletic	1 August 2020	7 March 2021	41	17	6	18	41.46	
Barnet	10 June 2021	20 September 2021	7	0	2	5	0.00	
Yokohama F. Marinos	31 December 2023	15 July 2024	33	13	8	12	39.39	
Hanoi FC	4 October 2025	Present	25	14	3	8	56.00	
Career Total			178	65	35	78	36.52	

== Honours ==
=== Player ===
Leeds United Youth

- FA Youth Cup: 1996–97

Liverpool

- FA Cup: 2005–06
- UEFA Champions League: 2004–05; runner-up: 2006–07
- Football League Cup runner-up: 2004–05
- FIFA Club World Championship runner-up: 2005

Galatasaray

- Turkish Super Cup: 2008

Australia

- AFC Asian Cup runner-up: 2011
- OFC Nations Cup: 2004
- FIFA Confederations Cup runner-up: 1997

Australia U-20

- OFC U-19 Men's Championship: 1997

Australia U17

- OFC U-17 Championship: 1995

Individual

- Oceania Footballer of the Year: 1999, 2001, 2003
- Ballon d'Or: 2001 (Nominee)
- FIFA Confederations Cup All-Star Team: 1997
- PFA Young Player of the Year: 1999–2000
- PFA Team of the Year: 1999–2000 Premier League
- AFC Asian Cup Team of the Tournament: 2007
- AFC Asian Cup Quality Player: 2011
- A-League Team of the Season: 2011–12
- FIFA World Cup Man of the Match: 2006 vs Croatia (GS)
- Leeds United Player of the Year: 1999–2000
- Leeds United Goal of the Year: 1999–2000 (vs. Sheffield Wednesday)
- Australia's Greatest Ever Footballer: 2012
- Australia's Greatest Ever Team: 2012
- Asian Football Hall of Fame: 2014
- PFA Alex Tobin OAM Medal: 2016
- Sport Australia Hall of Fame: 2018
- Football Australia Hall of Fame: 2019

=== Manager ===
Yokohama F. Marinos

- AFC Champions League: runner-up 2023–24
