= Yaser Yıldız =

Turkish footballer

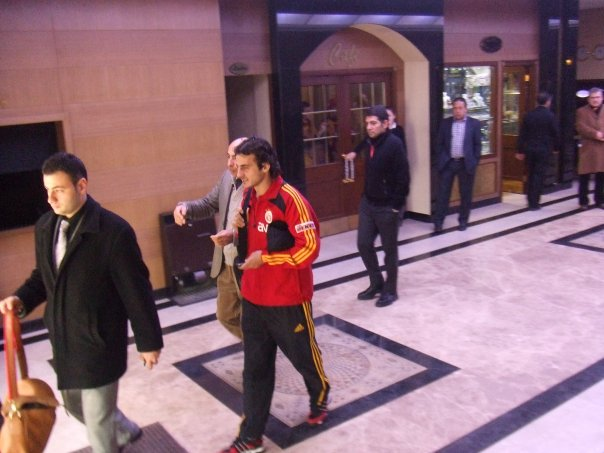

Personal information
- Date of birth: June 1, 1988 (age 38)
- Place of birth: Adapazarı, Turkey
- Height: 1.82 m (6 ft 0 in)
- Position: Forward

Team information
- Current team: Vanspor
- Number: 11

Youth career
- 2001: Harmanlıkspor
- 2001–2003: Sakaryaspor
- 2003–2004: Beşiktaş PAF

Senior career*
Years	Team	Apps	(Gls)
2005–2006	Denizlispor	9	(0)
2005–2006	→ Mersin İdmanyurdu (loan)	28	(2)
2006–2007	→ Uşakspor (loan)	4	(0)
2007–2008	Kartalspor	32	(18)
2008–2009	Galatasaray	12	(0)
2009–2010	Manisaspor	10	(0)
2010–2012	Boluspor	21	(3)
2012	Adanaspor	16	(5)
2012–2013	Kartalspor	28	(3)
2014–2015	Pendikspor	55	(15)
2015–2016	Ümraniyespor	27	(3)
2016–2019	Sarıyer	111	(36)
2020	Utaş Uşakspor	10	(2)
2020–	Vanspor	3	(0)

International career
2003–2004	Turkey U16	11	(0)
2004	Turkey U17	3	(1)
2008–	Turkey U20	2	(0)
- * Club domestic league appearances and goals as of 14 October 2020

Yaser Yıldız (born June 1, 1988 in Adapazarı, Turkey) is a Turkish footballer who plays as a forward for Vanspor. He scored the finishing goal against Bellinzona what ended 2–1 win for Galatasaray in first round UEFA Cup.

== Career statistics ==
Club	Season	League		Cup		League Cup		Europe		Total	
Club	Season	Apps	Goals	Apps	Goals	Apps	Goals	Apps	Goals	Apps	Goals
Galatasaray	2008–09	12	0	4	2	0	0	3	1	19	3
Galatasaray	2009–10	0	0	0	0	0	0	2	0	2	0
Galatasaray	Total	12	0	4	2	0	0	5	1	21	3
Manisaspor	2009–10	0	0	0	0	0	0	0	0	0	0
Manisaspor	Total	0	0	0	0	0	0	0	0	0	0

As of 3 September 2009

== Honours ==
- Galatasaray
  - Turkish Super Cup: 1 (2008)
