= Uğur Erdoğan =

Turkish footballer

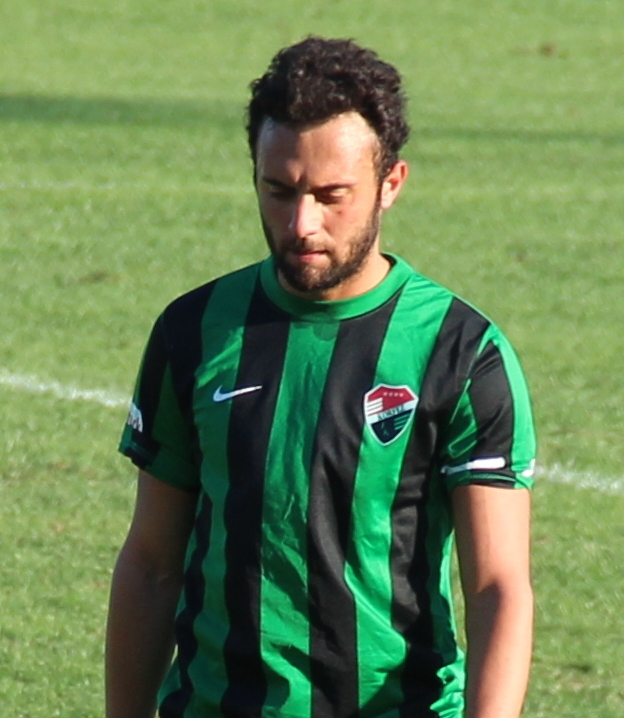

Personal information
- Date of birth: January 1, 1987 (age 39)
- Place of birth: Istanbul, Turkey
- Height: 1.81 m (5 ft 11 in)
- Positions: Right wing; forward

Youth career
- Zeytinburnuspor

Senior career*
Years	Team	Apps	(Gls)
2004–2009	Galatasaray		
2006–2007	→ İstanbulspor (loan)	25	(3)
2007–2008	→ Orduspor (loan)	27	(2)
2008–2011	Gaziantep BB	55	(9)
2011	Kartalspor	5	(0)
2011	Ünyespor	1	(0)
2012	Denizlispor	1	(0)
2012–2013	Sarıyer	23	(2)
2013–2015	Kocaeli Birlik Spor	37	(19)
2015	→ Yeni Malatyaspor (loan)	7	(1)
2015–2016	Fethiyespor	31	(8)
2016–2017	Kahramanmaraşspor	32	(2)
2017	Menemen Belediyespor	4	(0)
2018	Karacabey Birlikspor	15	(3)
2018–2019	Bergama Belediyespor	20	(5)
2019–2020	Yozgatspor 1959	24	(4)
2020–2021	Tekirdağspor	0	(0)
- * Club domestic league appearances and goals

Uğur Erdoğan (born January 1, 1987) is a Turkish former footballer. He has been trained by the Galatasaray S.K. PAF youth department.
