= Alparslan Erdem =

Turkish professional footballer

Personal information
- Date of birth: 11 December 1988 (age 37)
- Place of birth: Vechta, West Germany
- Height: 1.74 m (5 ft 9 in)
- Positions: Left back; centre midfielder

Team information
- Current team: KF Shkupi (manager)

Youth career
- 1993–1994: 1. FC Varenesch
- 1994–1996: TuS Lutten
- 1996–2000: SFN Vechta
- 2000–2003: Blau-Weiß Lohne
- 2003–2006: Werder Bremen

Senior career*
Years	Team	Apps	(Gls)
2006–2008	Werder Bremen II	38	(0)
2008–2010	Galatasaray	11	(0)
2010–2011	Gençlerbirliği	12	(0)
2011–2013	Bucaspor	59	(0)
2013–2019	İstanbul Başakşehir	68	(1)
2019–2022	Fatih Karagümrük	34	(1)

International career
2007–2009	Turkey U21	11	(0)
2013	Turkey A2	1	(0)

Managerial career
- 2022–2023: Fatih Karagümrük (assistant)
- 2023: Fatih Karagümrük
- 2025–: KF Shkupi
- * Club domestic league appearances and goals as of 28 June 2023

Alparslan Erdem (born 11 December 1988) is a Turkish former professional footballer who played as a left back and manages the Macedonian First Football League club KF Shkupi.

== Career ==
Erdem played previously for Galatasaray and Werder Bremen II.

On 18 January 2010, Alparslan Erdem signed a two-and-a-half-year contract with Turkish club Gençlerbirliği.

== Managerial Statistics ==
As of 9 December 2023

Team	Nat	From	To	Record				
Team	Nat	From	To	G	W	D	L	Win %
Fatih Karagümrük S.K. (Caretaker Manager)	(Turkey)	24 May 2023	15 July 2023	3	2	1	0	66.67
Fatih Karagümrük S.K.	(Turkey)	15 July 2023	11 December 2023	15	5	4	6	33.33
Total				18	7	5	6	38.89

== Honours ==
Galatasaray

- Turkish Super Cup: 2008
