= 2008 Turkish Super Cup =

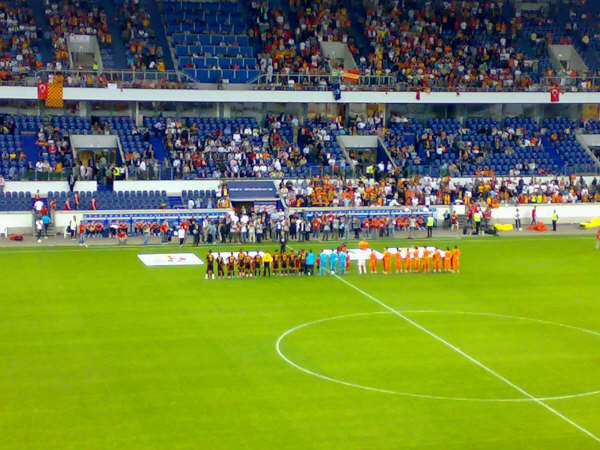
- Event: Turkish Super Cup
Galatasaray	Kayserispor
2	1
- Date: 17 August 2008
- Venue: MSV Arena, Duisburg
- Man of the Match: Harry Kewell (Galatasaray)
- Referee: Selçuk Dereli (Turkey)
- Attendance: 20,000

The 2008 Turkish Super Cup was a football match between the Süper Lig champions Galatasaray, and the Turkish Cup winners Kayserispor. This was the third Super Cup match, played on 17 August 2008, in Duisburg, MSV-Arena. Galatasaray won the game 2–1 with goals from Harry Kewell and Shabani Nonda, while Mehmet Topuz scored a last-minute consolation goal for his side.

== Match details ==
17 August 2008
20:00 CEST

Galatasaray	2–1	Kayserispor
Kewell 66'; Nonda 73'	Report (in Turkish)	M. Topuz 89'

MSV-Arena, Duisburg
Referee: Selçuk Dereli (Turkey)

GALATASARAY:
GK	1	(Turkey) Aykut Erçetin
DF	5	(Portugal) Fernando Meira
DF	76	(Turkey) Servet Çetin
DF	55	(Turkey) Sabri Sarıoğlu
DF	22	(Turkey) Hakan Balta		(substituted off) 73'
MF	11	(Turkey) Hasan Şaş		(substituted off) 83'
MF	18	(Turkey) Ayhan Akman (c)
MF	14	(Turkey) Mehmet Topal
MF	8	(Turkey) Barış Özbek		(substituted off) 66'
MF	10	(Brazil) Lincoln	(yellow card) 62'
FW	9	(Democratic Republic of the Congo) Shabani Nonda	(yellow card) 90'
Substitutes:
GK	26	(Italy) Morgan de Sanctis
DF	74	(Turkey) Volkan Yaman		(substituted on) 73'
DF	21	(Turkey) Emre Aşık
MF	19	(Australia) Harry Kewell		(substituted on) 66'
MF	60	(Turkey) Alparslan Erdem		(substituted on) 83'
FW	17	(Turkey) Yaser Yıldız
FW	83	(Turkey) Erhan Şentürk
Manager:
(Germany) Michael Skibbe
Man of the match:
(Australia) Harry Kewell (Galatasaray)

KAYSERISPOR:
GK	1	(Cameroon) Souleymanou Hamidou
DF	12	(Paraguay) Delio Toledo
DF	35	(Turkey) Eren Güngör
DF	2	(Turkey) Ali Turan
DF	51	(Turkey) Koray Çölgeçen		(substituted off) 70'
MF	67	(Turkey) Mehmet Eren
MF	6	(Argentina) Matías Escobar		(substituted off) 88'
MF	7	(Cameroon) Alioum Saidou	(yellow card) 75'
MF	66	(Turkey) Mehmet Topuz (c)
FW	11	(Montenegro) Milan Purovic		(substituted off) 74'
FW	17	(Nigeria) Julius Aghahowa
Substitutes:
GK	13	(Turkey) Ali Üçkulak
DF	2	(Turkey) Durmuş Bayram		(substituted on) 70'
DF	77	(Turkey) Orkun Bal
MF	20	(Cameroon) Salomon Olembe
MF	90	(Turkey) Furkan Özçal
MF	87	(Turkey) Abdullah Durak		(substituted on) 88'
MF	11	(Turkey) Umut Koçin	(yellow card) 81'	(substituted on) 74'
Manager:
(Turkey) Tolunay Kafkas
