= Umut Koçin =

Association football player (born 1988)

Personal information
- Date of birth: 2 June 1988 (age 38)
- Place of birth: Hamburg, West Germany
- Height: 1.83 m (6 ft 0 in)
- Position: Attacking midfielder

Youth career
- HT 1816 Hamburg
- –2006: Hamburger SV

Senior career*
| Years | Team | Apps | (Gls) |
| 2006–2008 | Arminia Bielefeld II | 26 | (9) |
| 2008–2010 | Kayserispor | 23 | (0) |
| 2010–2011 | Kapfenberger SV | 22 | (1) |
| 2011–2013 | RB Leipzig | 24 | (0) |
| 2013–2014 | Karşıyaka | 5 | (1) |
| 2014 | Pazarspor | 15 | (2) |
| 2014 | Nazilli Belediyespor | 9 | (0) |
| 2015 | Hamburger SV II | 6 | (0) |
| 2015–2016 | Türkiye Wilhelmsburg | 26 | (17) |
| 2016–2018 | Sancaktepe | 61 | (16) |
| 2018–2019 | Amed | 21 | (4) |
| 2019–2021 | Concordia Hamburg | 26 | (13) |
| Total | | 264 | (63) |

International career
| 2005–2006 | Turkey U18 | 4 | (0) |
| 2005–2007 | Turkey U19 | 12 | (0) |
| 2008 | Turkey U20 | 2 | (0) |
| 2009 | Turkey U21 | 2 | (0) |
- * Club domestic league appearances and goals

Umut Koçin (born 2 June 1988) is a former professional footballer who played as an attacking midfielder. Born in Germany, he represented Turkey internationally at youth levels.
