= Fırat Kocaoğlu =

Turkish footballer

Personal information
- Full name: Sadrettin Fırat Kocaoğlu
- Date of birth: 5 February 1988 (age 38)
- Place of birth: Ankara, Turkey
- Height: 1.86 m (6 ft 1 in)
- Position: Goalkeeper

Youth career
- 2000–2008: Galatasaray

Senior career*
Years	Team	Apps	(Gls)
2005–2008	Galatasaray A2	69	(0)
2008–2010	Galatasaray	0	(0)
2008–2009	→ Beylerbeyi (loan)	14	(0)
2009–2010	→ Kasımpaşa (loan)	0	(0)
2010–2012	Kasımpaşa	21	(0)
2012–2013	Çaykur Rizespor	2	(0)
2013–2014	Boluspor	1	(0)
2014–2015	Gölbaşıspor	31	(0)
2015–2016	Adanaspor	1	(0)
2016–2017	Sarıyer	26	(0)
2017–2020	BB Bodrumspor	34	(0)

International career
2005–2006	Turkey U18	5	(0)
2006–2007	Turkey U19	7	(0)
2008	Turkey U20	2	(0)
2007	Turkey U21	1	(0)
2011	Turkey A2	1	(0)
- * Club domestic league appearances and goals as of 16:09, 30 October 2022 (UTC)

Fırat Kocaoğlu (born 5 February 1988) is a Turkish professional footballer who plays as a goalkeeper.
