= Servet Çetin =

Turkish footballer (born 1981)

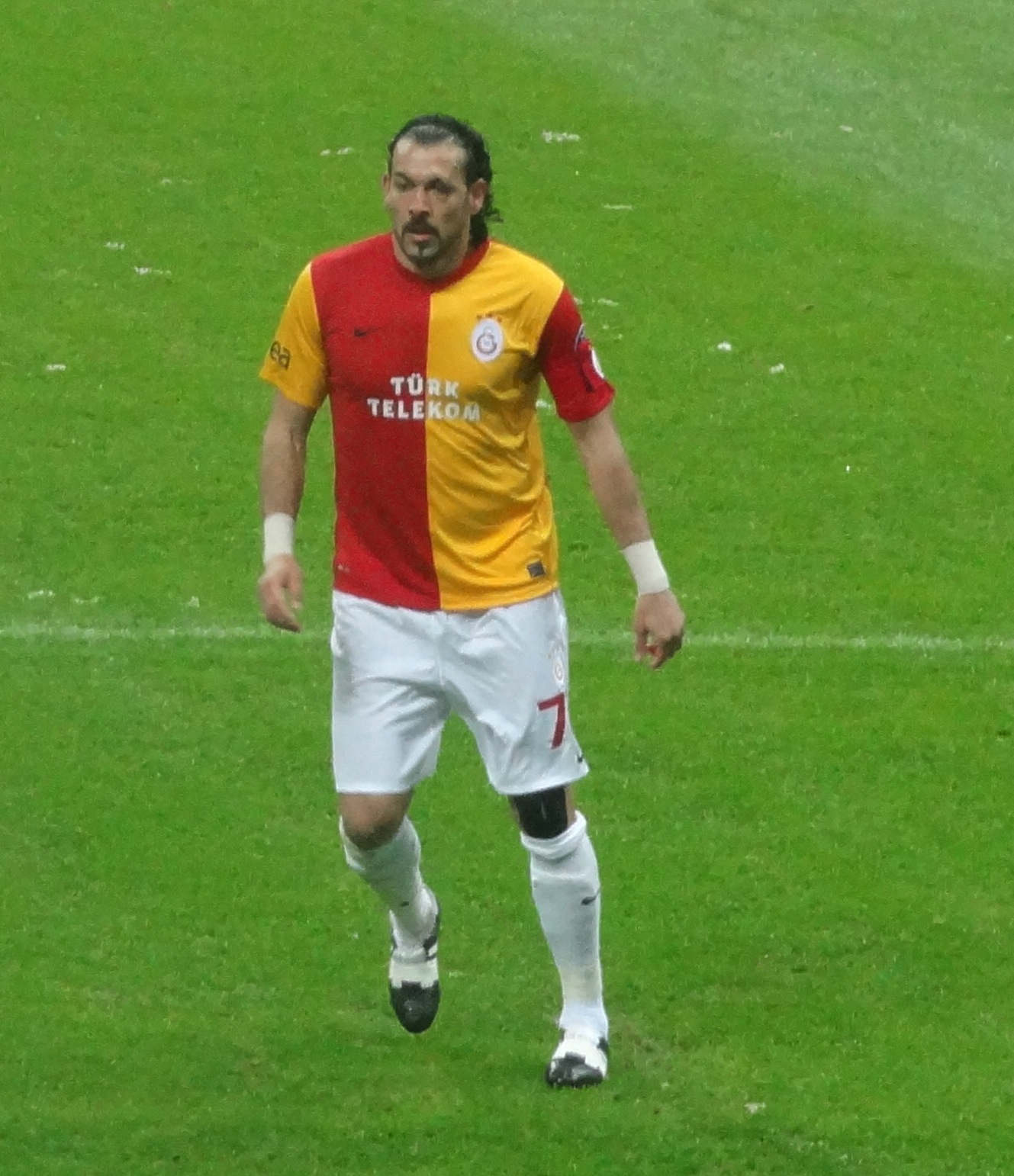

Personal information
- Date of birth: 17 March 1981 (age 45)
- Place of birth: Tuzluca, Iğdır, Turkey
- Height: 1.91 m (6 ft 3 in)
- Position: Centre-back

Team information
- Current team: Sarıyer (head coach)

Youth career
- 1994–1998: Kartalspor

Senior career*
Years	Team	Apps	(Gls)
1997–2001	Kartalspor	51	(1)
2001–2002	Göztepe	31	(1)
2002–2003	Denizlispor	35	(2)
2003–2006	Fenerbahçe	36	(3)
2006–2007	Sivasspor	28	(2)
2007–2012	Galatasaray	117	(10)
2012–2014	Eskişehirspor	39	(3)
2014–2016	Mersin İdman Yurdu	47	(4)
Total		384	(25)

International career
1998	Turkey U17	1	(0)
1998	Turkey U18	1	(0)
2002–2003	Turkey U21	17	(0)
2006	Turkey A2	1	(0)
2003–2011	Turkey	59	(3)

Managerial career
- 2017–2018: Trabzonspor (assistant)
- 2018: Konyaspor (assistant)
- 2019–2023: Sivasspor (assistant)
- 2023: Sivasspor
- 2024–2025: Amedspor
- 2025–: Sarıyer
- * Club domestic league appearances and goals

Servet Çetin (born 17 March 1981) is a Turkish football manager and former player who's currently coaching Sarıyer. Çetin began his football journey in 1990 when he joined Kartalspor after a chance encounter. Initially an amateur, he progressed to professional terms with Göztepe and later Denizlispor.

His impressive European performance with Denizlispor led him to Fenerbahçe, where he faced challenges and triumphs, including winning the Süper Lig and earning a spot in Turkey national team.

He received the nickname "Ayıboğan" which literally means; a man who could choke a bear, due to his height and strength. He also has the nickname "Türkü Baba" due to the numerous Turkish folk music on his iPod.

== Club career ==
=== Early career ===
Çetin joined Kartalspor in 1990 after the club manager called his house looking for his older brother İrfan who was playing as a midfielder for the club at the time. Servet informed the club's manager that his older brother was not home and would not be returning until later that evening. The club's manager, in a bind to find players for the match later that day, questioned Servet's interest in football and upon learning that he was interested, Servet was invited to join the club as an amateur player and played in the match later that day as a right-back. Servet was signed onto professional terms at the start of the 1999–2000 season.

He joined Göztepe at the start of the 2001–02 season. Having a successful first season in the Süper Lig his club finished 7th and missed out on a UEFA Cup berth.

He was signed by Rıza Çalımbay for Denizlispor at the start of the 2002–03 season in a deal which also involved Ersen Martin and Mustafa Özkan. Despite missing out on the UEFA Cup with Göztepe, Çetin got a chance to play European football at his new club as Denizlispor. He was an integral part of the team which eliminated Lorient, Sparta Prague and Lyon in the first, second and third rounds of the competition respectively. In the fourth round, Denizlispor lost to the eventual winners José Mourinho's Porto. Çetin had become a household name in Turkish football with his performances for Denizlispor in the league as well as for the Turkey Under-21.

=== Fenerbahçe ===
With interest in Çetin high by the big clubs in Turkey, Denizlispor reached an agreement with Fenerbahçe for a reported $1.5 million for the strong centre back to start the 2003–04 season. As Fenerbahçe won the Süper Lig, Çetin managed eight league appearances in his first season at the club with manager Christoph Daum regularly preferring the pairing of Fabio Luciano and Önder Turacı at the heart of the defense.

Fenerbahçe won the Süper Lig for a second season in a row in 2004–05 with Çetin partnering Fabio Luciano for most of the season at the heart of the defense. An injury in March 2005 cut his season short and Çetin did not return to action until September of later that year. After finally returning from injury Çetin once again became a first choice in the centre of defense for Fenerbahçe. After the sacking of Christoph Daum at the end of the 2005–06 season, his replacement Zico signed the central defender pairing of Diego Lugano and Edu Dracena. With first team opportunities looking unlikely, Çetin joined Sivasspor on the transfer deadline day in 2006, with Fenerbahçe not demanding a fee.

=== Sivasspor ===
Sivasspor and manager Bülent Uygun welcomed the experience of Çetin at the heart of defense as he became a regular in the side and he once again re-discovered his old form, helping lead Sivasspor to 7th place. At the end of the season, Çetin was on the move again with Galatasaray the interested party this time. The move was for a reported $600,000.

=== Galatasaray ===
On 15 April 2007, Çetin signed a three-year contract with Galatasaray. After settling into the team and under the tutelage of Karl-Heinz Feldkamp, Çetin's play improved immensely and he managed to become a favourite of Galatasaray fans shortly thereafter. Çetin reaffirmed his importance to the club with an impressive first season with Galatasaray. He was partnered with Rigobert Song in the first half of the season and by Emre Güngör in the second half of the season. Çetin made almost 50 appearances and chipped in with five goals in the league winning campaign and became a fixture in the Turkey national team. He was also selected for the UEFA Euro 2008 squad by Fatih Terim.

After returning from UEFA Euro 2008, Çetin continued to be a fixture in Galatasaray's defense. However, his season was cut short in late February 2009 as a foot injury he suffered kept him out for the rest of the season. This injury came at the worst time possible as Galatasaray's back line was ravaged with injuries. Galatasaray finished the season 5th in the league but reached the last 16 of the UEFA Cup.

The 2009–10 season also brought change at Galatasaray as Frank Rijkaard was appointed manager. Çetin began the season with a new partner at the heart of the defense with the newly signed Gökhan Zan, Çetin's central defence partner for the Turkey national team. Çetin's play suffered under the manager's new system as Rijkaard demanded that defenders play the ball out of the defence, which was never the towering defender's strong point. After Gökhan Zan suffered a serious shoulder injury, Galatasaray signed Lucas Neill for the heart of the defence. After the end of the 2011–12 season, the club did not want to renew his contract, so he became a free agent from 1 June 2012.

=== Eskişehirspor ===
On 1 July 2012, Çetin parted ways with Galatasaray and signed two-year contract with Eskişehirspor. He made his debut in a match against Akhisarspor. Scoring his first goal in the 10th week against Gaziantepspor. On 26 November 2012, Çetin showcased a memorable performance when Eskişehirspor defeated Trabzonspor 3–0 at Hüseyin Avni Aker Stadium. During this match, he initiated a play from the defense, carrying the ball from the center of Trabzonspor's half, eluding opponents with dribbles and a body feint. As he entered the penalty area, he took a shot over the goalkeeper and into the net, a goal considered a highlight in Çetin's career. With this goal, he achieved his second for the team. Primarily partnering with Diego Ângelo in central defense, Çetin concluded the season with 26 league appearances and 2 goals. He also participated in four UEFA Europa League matches and seven Turkish Cup matches that season.

In the 2013–14 season, under the management of Ertuğrul Sağlam, Çetin lost his starting spot to Jerry Akaminko. Throughout the first half of the season, he appeared in three matches. Despite contemplating transfers to Çaykur Rizespor and Elazığspor, he ultimately remained with the team due to Jerry Akaminko's injury and regained his position, including Turkish Cup matches. On 25 January 2014, Çetin started in the first 11 against Bursaspor. In the 75th minute, with Ruud Boffin receiving a red card and the team exhausting all substitutions, Çetin took over as the goalkeeper. During his time in goal, he made numerous crucial saves and prevented the opposing team from scoring, including stopping a penalty taken by Taye Taiwo after a foul by Dedê in the 83rd minute. This save reminded many of his former teammate Felipe Melo. Despite his efforts, Çetin could not prevent Stanislav Šesták's goal in the 90+4 minute, and the match concluded with a 3–1 victory for Bursaspor. That season, he participated in 13 Süper Lig matches and 7 Turkish Cup matches. His contract was not extended at the end of the season.

=== Mersin İdman Yurdu ===
Prior to the 2014–15 transfer window, Çetin's name was linked with several clubs. Eventually, he signed a one-year contract with Mersin İdman Yurdu, a team managed by Rıza Çalımbay, who also brought in players like Serkan Balcı, Márkó Futács, and Welliton. He played a total of 47 matches in the league with Mersin İdman Yurdu and contributed 4 goals. After the end of the 2015–16 season Çetin retired from his football playing career.

== International career ==
Çetin progressed through the youth ranks of the Turkey national team, from Under-17 to the full senior squad. He made his debut for Turkey in a 4–0 friendly match loss against Czech Republic on 30 April 2003, coming on for Alpay Özalan in the 83rd minute. He made two appearances at the FIFA Confederations Cup in 2003. He captained the international side for the first time during Turkey's 2–1 win against Bosnia and Herzegovina in October 2008. Çetin played in the qualifiers for the European Championships and featured in the finals of the tournament itself. However, he picked up injuries during the group stages and meant he could only feature in three of Turkey's games as they progressed to the semi-finals.

== Managerial career ==
From 2017 to 2023, Çetin served as an assistant coach under Rıza Çalımbay's leadership. This period prepared him for his next step. On 26 June 2023, after Rıza Çalımbay left Sivasspor, Çetin took over as the head coach. This transition showcased his evolution from a player to a coach, and his new role presented opportunities to apply his football knowledge and leadership skills.

== Playing style ==
Çetin is known as 'Bionic Servet' for his strength and bravery to push on playing despite serious injuries. In UEFA Euro 2008 his injuries included a torn groin, strained knee ligaments, a broken tooth and a bruised hip bone all at once. Another nickname used for Çetin is 'Terminator Servet' due to the face-mask he obtained after his cheekbone was broken.

== Personal life ==
Çetin is of Azerbaijani descent.

== Career statistics ==
As of 14 March 2013

=== Club ===
Appearances and goals by club, season and competition
Club	Season	League		Cup		Europe		Total	
Club	Season	Apps	Goals	Apps	Goals	Apps	Goals	Apps	Goals
Kartalspor	1997–98	1	0	0	0	–		1	0
Kartalspor	1998–99	5	1	1	0	–		6	1
Kartalspor	1999–2000	19	0	2	0	–		21	0
Kartalspor	2000–01	26	0	0	0	–		26	0
Kartalspor	Total	51	1	3	0	—		54	1
Göztepe	2001–02	31	1	1	0	–		32	1
Denizlispor	2002–03	31	2	2	0	8	0	41	2
Denizlispor	2003–04	4	0	0	0	–		4	0
Denizlispor	Total	35	2	2	0	8	0	45	2
Fenerbahçe	2003–04	8	0	1	0	–		9	0
Fenerbahçe	2004–05	23	3	3	1	6	0	32	4
Fenerbahçe	2005–06	11	0	6	0	1	0	18	0
Fenerbahçe	2006–07	0	0	0	0	1	0	1	0
Fenerbahçe	Total	42	3	10	1	8	0	60	4
Sivasspor	2006–07	28	2	5	0	–		33	2
Galatasaray	2007–08	33	3	8	0	10	0	52	3
Galatasaray	2008–09	20	2	3	0	9	0	32	2
Galatasaray	2009–10	24	1	6	0	11	1	41	2
Galatasaray	2010–11	31	4	6	1	4	0	41	5
Galatasaray	2011–12	9	0	1	0	–		10	0
Galatasaray	Total	117	10	24	1	34	1	175	12
Eskişehirspor	2012–13	23	2	6	0	4	0	33	2
Career total		327	21	51	2	54	1	432	24

=== International ===
Appearances and goals by national team and year
National team	Year	Apps	Goals
Turkey	2003	4	0
Turkey	2004	5	0
Turkey	2005	0	0
Turkey	2006	7	0
Turkey	2007	10	1
Turkey	2008	11	0
Turkey	2009	6	2
Turkey	2010	10	0
Turkey	2011	6	0
Total		59	3

Scores and results list Turkey's goal tally first, score column indicates score after each Çetin goal.

List of international goals scored by Servet Çetin
No.	Date	Venue	Opponent	Score	Result	Competition
1	8 September 2007	Ta' Qali Stadium, Ta' Qali, Malta	Malta	2–2	2–2	UEFA Euro 2008 qualifying
2	12 August 2009	Lobanovsky Dynamo Stadium, Kyiv, Ukraine	Ukraine	2–0	3–0	Friendly
3	14 October 2009	Bursa Atatürk Stadium, Bursa, Turkey	Armenia	2–0	2–0	2010 FIFA World Cup qualification

== Managerial statistics ==
As of 23 December 2023

Team	Nat	From	To	Record				
Team	Nat	From	To	G	W	D	L	Win %
Sivasspor	(Turkey)	26 June 2023	Present	19	7	6	6	36.84
Total				19	7	6	6	36.84

== Honours ==
Fenerbahçe

- Süper Lig: 2003–04, 2004–05

Galatasaray

- Süper Lig: 2007–08, 2011–12
- Turkish Super Cup: 2007–08

Turkey

- FIFA Confederations Cup bronze: 2003
- UEFA European Championship bronze medalist: 2008

Sporting positions
Preceded by Hakkı Hocaoğlu	Sivasspor captain 2006–2007	Succeeded by Mehmet Yıldız
