= Aydın Yılmaz =

Turkish footballer (born 1988)

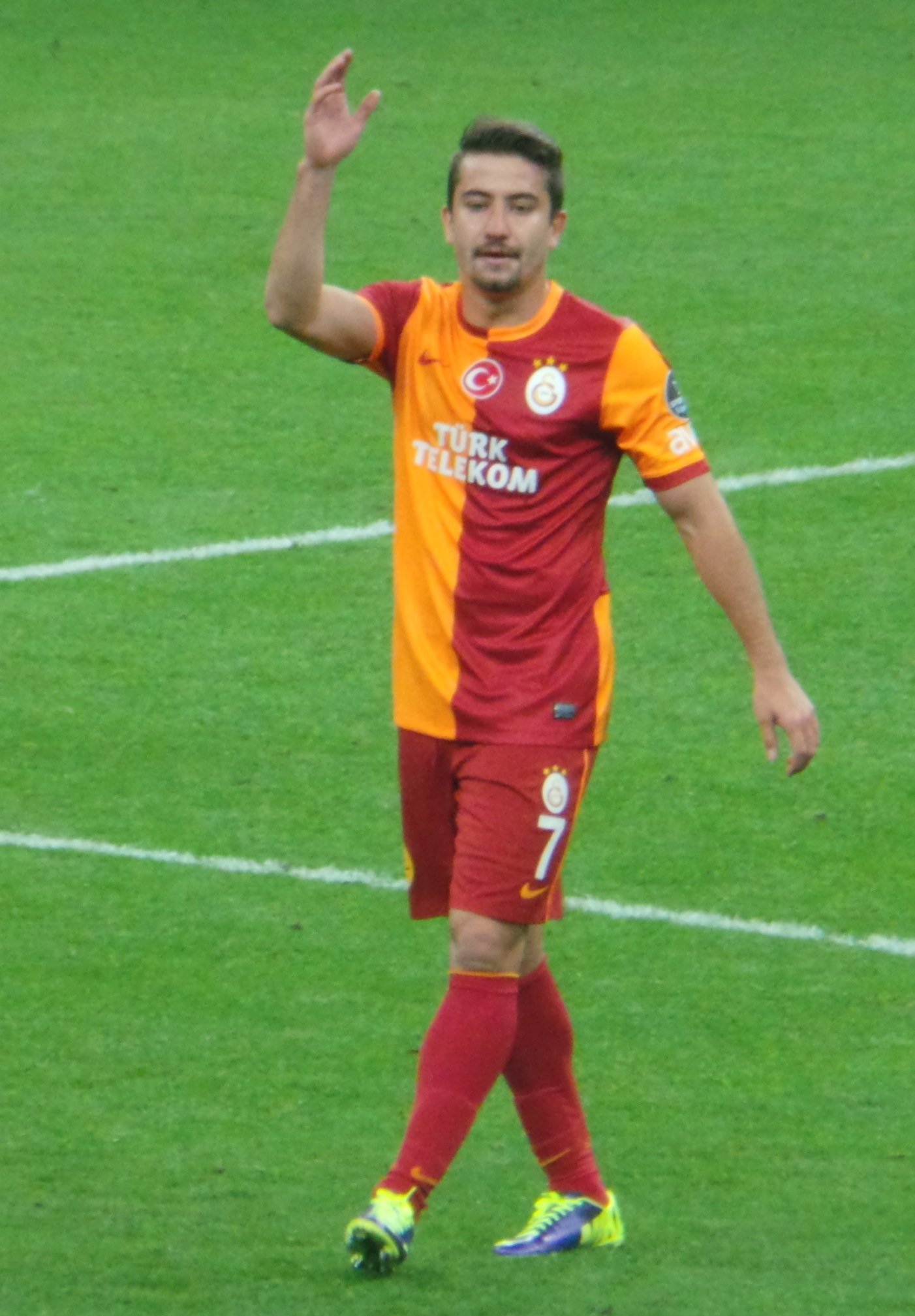

Personal information
- Date of birth: 29 January 1988 (age 38)
- Place of birth: Bakırköy, Istanbul, Turkey
- Height: 1.76 m (5 ft 9 in)
- Position: Winger

Youth career
- 1998–2005: Galatasaray

Senior career*
Years	Team	Apps	(Gls)
2006–2015	Galatasaray	99	(5)
2007	→ Manisaspor (loan)	0	(0)
2008	→ İstanbul BB (loan)	7	(0)
2010	→ Eskişehirspor (loan)	9	(0)
2015–2018	Kasımpaşa	7	(0)
2018–2019	Adana Demirspor	12	(0)
2019	Sakaryaspor	7	(0)
2020	Příbram	0	(0)
2021	Menemenspor	4	(0)
2021–2022	İskenderunspor	11	(1)

International career
2003–2004	Turkey U16	10	(0)
2004–2005	Turkey U17	21	(2)
2005	Turkey U18	3	(2)
2006	Turkey U19	14	(4)
2008–2009	Turkey U21	10	(3)
2011–2013	Turkey A2	4	(0)
2012	Turkey	1	(0)
- * Club domestic league appearances and goals as of 7 May 2022

Aydın Yılmaz (Turkish pronunciation: [ˈajdɯn jɯɫˈmaz], born 29 January 1988) is a Turkish professional footballer.

== Early life ==
1988 born in Istanbul Aydın Yılmaz, Florya Metin Oktay Facilities at 9 years old football player stepped into audition. Aydın Yılmaz into junior team of Galatasaray in 2001, under the Danone in 2002, Galatasaray shirt Championship fight took place in the squad.

== Club career ==
=== Galatasaray ===
On 22 January 2006, Aydın scored a last-minute winning goal for Galatasaray against Konyaspor after coming on as a substitute for his debut game in the Süper Lig. That goal was seen as one of the cornerstones of the famous 2006 title of Galatasaray. On 4 June 2008 he signed a 5-year deal with his club Galatasaray.

=== Manisaspor ===
Was transferred to the 2007-08 season on loan at Manisaspor.

=== Istanbul BB ===
Second half of the 2007-08 season on loan at Istanbul BB team played in seven games. The name appears to be the most effective team in recent weeks, especially Aydin, at the end of the season again returned to Galatasaray.

=== Eskisehirspor ===
Aydin was loaned to Eskisehirspor for the 2009-10 season with a buying option, Eskisehirspor didn't use this option and he returned to Galatasaray.

=== Return to Galatasaray ===
==== 2011–12 season ====
2011–12 season, 27 Aydin week of Mersin İdman Yurdu included in the game play in this match later earned a penalty and has been one of the biggest factors in winning team 3 points. Sivasspor match played later on in the game, including 29 weeks in the match with a goal-scoring success in Aydin and said after the game that the said gift to this goal in the new-born daughter. He played 15 matches in the league and he was among the champion squad.

==== 2012–13 season ====
Aydın considered as a good alternative player for 2012–13 Süper Lig Season. He made 17 league and 2 Turkish Cup appearances including his team dramatically eliminated by 1461 Trabzon. After new superstars Wesley Sneijder and Didier Drogba joined to team Aydın was relegated to the out of bench and he started to take less minutes on league matches. He also represented his team in Champions League against Sporting Braga for both home and away matches and Aydın scored a critical goal at Municipal Stadium which guaranteed Galatasaray to promote knockout phase.

== International career ==
Aydın played for the Turkish U-17 team that came 4th in the 2005 world youth championship in Peru. On 4 October 2008, he has been picked up to Turkey to play against Bosnia and Estonia.

Aydın made his debut for the Turkey national team on October 16, 2012, in a 2014 FIFA World Cup qualifier against Hungary.

== Honours ==
Galatasaray

- Süper Lig: 2005–06, 2011–12, 2012–13, 2014–15
- Türkiye Kupası: 2013–14, 2014–15
- Süper Kupa: 2008, 2012, 2013

== Career statistics ==
=== Club ===
As of 30 May 2015.

Club	Season	League		Cup		Super Cup		Europe		Total	
Club	Season	Apps	Goals	Apps	Goals	Apps	Goals	Apps	Goals	Apps	Goals
Galatasaray	2005–06	12	1	2	1	—		0	0	14	2
Galatasaray	2006–07	3	0	1	0	1	0	1	0	6	0
Galatasaray	2008–09	15	1	3	2	—		2	0	20	3
Galatasaray	2009–10	11	0	2	0	—		4	0	17	0
Galatasaray	2010–11	19	1	5	0	—		1	1	25	2
Galatasaray	2011–12	15	2	2	0	—		—		17	2
Galatasaray	2012–13	17	0	2	1	1	0	3	1	23	2
Galatasaray	2013–14	6	0	4	0	0	0	1	0	11	0
Galatasaray	2014–15	1	0	3	0	0	0	0	0	4	0
Galatasaray	Total	99	5	24	4	2	0	12	2	137	11
Manisaspor (loan)	2007–08	0	0	0	0	—		—		0	0
Manisaspor (loan)	Total	0	0	0	0	—		—		0	0
İstanbul B.B. (loan)	2007–08	7	0	0	0	—		—		7	0
İstanbul B.B. (loan)	Total	7	0	0	0	—		—		7	0
Eskişehirspor (loan)	2009–10	9	0	0	0	—		—		9	0
Eskişehirspor (loan)	Total	9	0	0	0	—		—		9	0
Career total		115	5	24	4	2	0	12	2	153	11

=== International ===
Turkey national team
Year	Apps	Goals
2012	1	0
Total	1	0
