= Volkan Yaman =

Turkish footballer

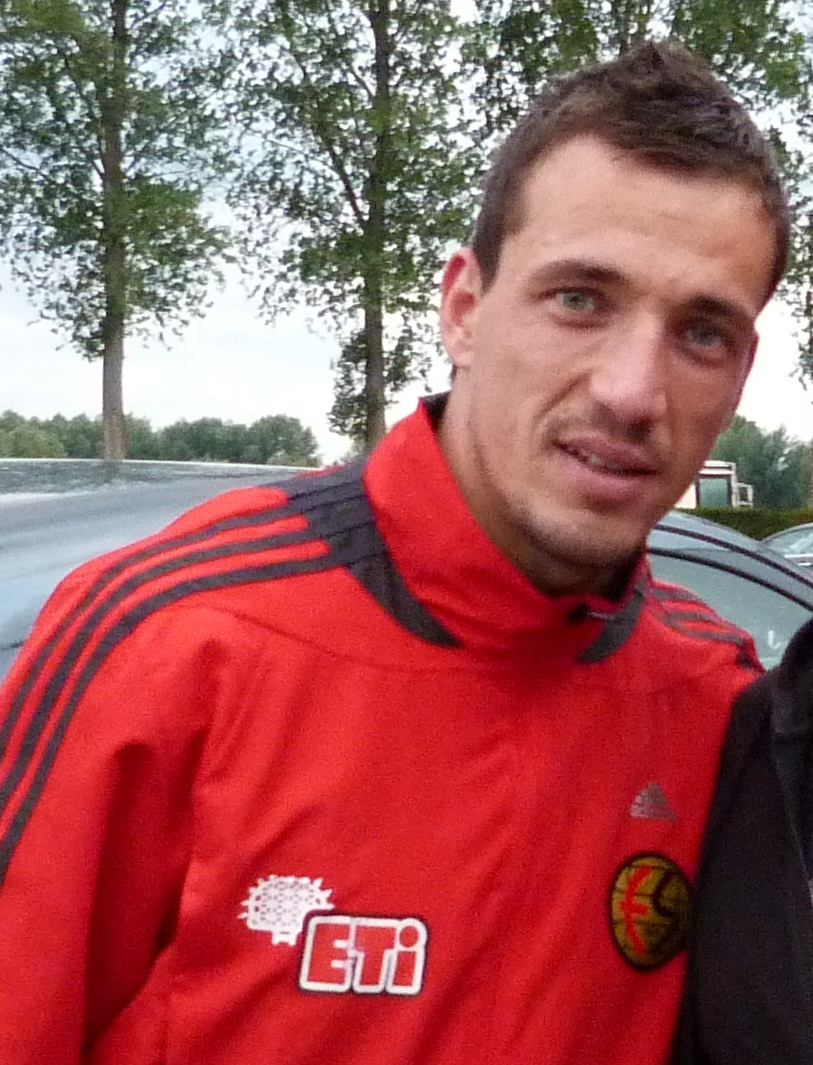

Personal information
- Date of birth: 27 August 1982 (age 44)
- Place of birth: Munich, West Germany
- Height: 1.83 m (6 ft 0 in)
- Positions: Left back; left winger

Youth career
- 1999–2001: TSV 1860 München
- 2001–2003: SC Freimann

Senior career*
Years	Team	Apps	(Gls)
2004–2007	Antalyaspor	74	(4)
2007–2009	Galatasaray	48	(1)
2009–2012	Eskişehirspor	71	(2)
2012–2014	Kasımpaşa	1	(0)
2015	VfR Garching	0	(0)
2015–2016	SV Heimstetten	3	(0)

International career
2006	Turkey	4	(0)
- * Club domestic league appearances and goals

Volkan Yaman (born 27 August 1982) is a Turkish former footballer. Yaman is known for his powerful shots.

== Career ==
Yaman has made his debut for Antalyaspor against Çaykur Rizespor on 6 August 2006. He has also been called for the Turkey national team, debuting on 24 May 2006 in Turkey's 3–3 draw against Belgium in Fenix Stadion, Genk.

== Honours ==
Galatasaray

- Süper Lig (1): 2007–08
- Süper Kupa (1): 2008
