= Uğur Akdemir =

Turkish footballer (born 1988)

Personal information
- Date of birth: 22 September 1988 (age 38)
- Place of birth: Eyüp, Turkey
- Height: 1.75 m (5 ft 9 in)
- Position: Defender

Youth career
- 2005–2008: Galatasaray

Senior career*
Years	Team	Apps	(Gls)
2007	→ Gaziantep BB (loan)	13	(0)
2007–2008	→ Orduspor (loan)	20	(1)
2008–2009	Çaykur Rizespor	13	(0)
2009–2010	Konyaspor	1	(0)
2010–2011	Diyarbakırspor	5	(0)
2011–2013	Kartalspor	52	(2)
2013–2015	Balıkesirspor	35	(0)
2015–2016	Adana Demirspor	8	(0)
2016	Eskişehirspor	0	(0)
2017–2018	Gaziantep BB	26	(0)
2018–2019	Boluspor	12	(0)
2019	Afjet Afyonspor	12	(0)
2019–2020	Giresunspor	18	(0)
2020–2022	Eyüpspor	38	(0)
2022–2023	İskenderunspor	4	(0)
2023–2024	Gençlerbirliği	26	(3)
2024	Ankara Keçiörengücü	12	(0)

International career
2006	Turkey U19	5	(0)
- * Club domestic league appearances and goals as of 10 May 2024

Uğur Akdemir (born 22 September 1988) is a Turkish professional footballer who plays as a defender.
