= Erhan Şentürk =

Turkish footballer

Personal information
- Full name: Mehmet Erhan Şentürk
- Date of birth: 4 May 1989 (age 37)
- Place of birth: Istanbul, Turkey
- Height: 1.76 m (5 ft 9 in)
- Positions: Winger; striker

Team information
- Current team: Bergama
- Number: 20

Youth career
- 2000–2008: Galatasaray

Senior career*
Years	Team	Apps	(Gls)
2008–2012	Galatasaray	1	(0)
2008–2010	→ Diyarbakırspor (loan)	50	(6)
2010–2011	→ Kartalspor (loan)	30	(9)
2011–2012	→ Karşıyaka (loan)	25	(3)
2012–2013	Çaykur Rizespor	10	(0)
2013–2014	Gaziantep BB	33	(2)
2014–2016	Kocaeli Birlik Spor	58	(18)
2016–2017	Ankaragücü	27	(7)
2017–2018	Bandırmaspor	33	(19)
2018–2019	Samsunspor	28	(6)
2019–2020	Sancaktepe	34	(8)
2021–2022	Afjet Afyonspor	52	(27)
2022–2023	Bucaspor 1928	23	(2)
2023–	Bergama	4	(2)

International career
2004–2005	Turkey U16	2	(0)
2006	Turkey U17	2	(0)
2006–2007	Turkey U18	16	(6)
2007–2008	Turkey U19	15	(3)
2009	Turkey U21	2	(1)
- * Club domestic league appearances and goals as of 1 October 2023

Erhan Şentürk (born 4 May 1989) is a Turkish professional footballer who plays for Bergama. Erhan is a product of Galatasaray's youth system.

== Career ==
He made his debut for Galatasaray against Steaua București in Aug 2008 (UEFA Champions League 2008–09 Third qualifying round, first match, in Ali Sami Yen), coming on as a substitute.

He has been playing for Diyarbakirspor since 2008 and has played 29 games in the second division and 4 games in Turkcell Super League.

== Honours ==
- Galatasaray
  - Turkish Super Cup: 1 (2008)
