= Selçuk Dereli =

Turkish football referee

- Born: 6 June 1969 (age 57); Köleli, Andırın, Turkey

Domestic
Years	League	Role

International
Years	League	Role
2003–2010	FIFA listed	Referee

Selçuk Dereli (born 6 June 1969) is a retired Turkish international referee who was active internationally until 2010.

He served as a referee in 2006 and 2010 World Cup qualifying, as well as UEFA Euro 2008 qualification.
