= Kartal S.K. =

Association football club in Turkey

Kartalspor
- Full name: Kartal Spor Kulübü
- Nicknames: Kartal, Partizan
- Founded: 18 August 1949; 76 years ago
- Ground: Kartal Bulvar Mimar Kubilay Köse Stadium, Istanbul
- Capacity: 2,000
- Chairman: Binali Aydın
- Manager: Rıdvan Elmastaş
- League: Turkish Regional Amateur League
Home colours	Away colours	Third colours

Kartalspor is a sports club located in the Kartal district of Istanbul, Turkey. The club's football team plays in the Bank Asya First League after finishing 2nd in the Second League Promotion Group in the 2006–2007 season. Kartal SK started the 2007–2008 season well and was 3rd with half of the games played, but had a disappointing second half of the season and finished 13th. This pattern recurred in the 2008–2009 season, finishing 12th whilst having been 6th halfway through.

The club is well known for its success at developing young players. They have produced players like Fenerbahçe and Turkey national football team goalkeeper Volkan Demirel, national team defender Servet Çetin, and Fenerbahçe former captain Egemen Korkmaz.

The club also has a women's team that finished 3rd in Turkey in 2007.

== League participations ==
- TFF First League: 1988–01, 2007–
- TFF Second League: 1984–88, 2001–07

== Current squad ==
Note: Flags indicate national team as defined under FIFA eligibility rules; some limited exceptions apply. Players may hold more than one non-FIFA nationality.

No.	Pos.	Nation	Player
1	GK	TUR	Osman Şimşek
3	MF	TUR	Mustafa Seker
6	DF	TUR	Mehmet Sait Ulucan
7	MF	TUR	Dündar Denizhan
8	MF	TUR	Kadir Samet Eser
9	FW	TUR	Aytek Öktem
10	MF	TUR	Recep Yaşar
17	MF	TUR	Safa Serbest
20	MF	TUR	Yasin Şahan
29	FW	TUR	Muhammet Yusuf Ocak

No.	Pos.	Nation	Player
35	DF	TUR	Oğuzhan Demir
39	GK	TUR	Armağan Önür
44	DF	TUR	Tulga Balcı
49	DF	TUR	Ömer Bozyiğit
53	MF	TUR	Ozan Solak
54	DF	TUR	Tugay Kaya
61	FW	TUR	Zafer Çuvalcı
67	GK	TUR	Ender Kaya
