= 2010–11 Galatasaray S.K. season =

Galatasaray
2010–11 season
- President: Adnan Polat (until 13 May 2011); Ünal Aysal
- Head coach: Frank Rijkaard (until 20 October 2010); Gheorghe Hagi (until 24 March 2011); Bülent Ünder (interim)
- Stadium: Ali Sami Yen Stadı (until 12 January 2011); Türk Telekom Arena
- Süper Lig: 8th
- Turkish Cup: Quarter-finals
- UEFA Europa League: Play-off round
- Top goalscorer: League: Milan Baroš (9); All: Milan Baroš (11)
- Highest home attendance: 51,393 vs Fenerbahçe SK (18 March 2011)
- Lowest home attendance: 7,517 vs Kasımpaşa SK (9 May 2011)
- Average home league attendance: 29,887
| Home colours | Away colours | Third colours |

The 2010–11 season was Galatasaray's 107th in existence and the 53rd consecutive season in the Süper Lig. This article shows statistics of the club's players in the season, and also lists all matches that the club have played in the season.

== Players ==
=== Squad information ===
| N | Pos. | Nat. | Name | Age | EU | Since | App | Goals | Ends | Transfer fee | Notes |
|---|---|---|---|---|---|---|---|---|---|---|---|
| 1 | GK | (Turkey) | Aykut | 43 | Non-EU | 2003 | 58 | 0 | 2012 | | |
| 2 | DF | (Australia) | Neill | 48 | EU | 2010 | 18 | 1 | 2011 | €0.84M | Second nationality: England |
| 3 | DF | (Turkey) | Çağlar | 40 | Non-EU | 2010 | 0 | 0 | 2013 | €1.5M | |
| 5 | DF | (Turkey) | Gökhan | 44 | Non-EU | 2009 | 16 | 0 | 2011 | Free | |
| 6 | DF | (Argentina) | Insúa | 37 | EU | 2010 | 0 | 0 | 2011 | Loan | Second nationality: Spain |
| 7 | MF | (Turkey) | Aydın | 38 | Non-EU | 2005 | 60 | 5 | 2013 | Youth system | |
| 8 | MF | (Turkey) | Barış | 39 | EU | 2007 | 113 | 11 | 2011 | | Second nationality: Germany |
| 10 | MF | (Turkey) | Arda (captain) | 39 | Non-EU | 2004 | 175 | 38 | 2012 | Youth system | |
| 12 | GK | (Turkey) | Emirhan | 36 | Non-EU | 2010 | 0 | 0 | 2011 | Youth system | |
| 15 | FW | (Czech Republic) | Baroš | 44 | EU | 2008 | 67 | 42 | 2013 | €5.5M | |
| 16 | MF | (Turkey) | Mustafa | 45 | Non-EU | 2009 | 49 | 4 | 2012 | Free | |
| 18 | MF | (Turkey) | Ayhan (VC) | 49 | Non-EU | 2001 | 256 | 15 | 2012 | €0.5M | |
| 19 | MF | (Albania) | Cana | 43 | Non-EU | 2010 | 0 | 0 | 2014 | €4.5M | Second nationality: Kosovo |
| 20 | MF | (Colombia) | Pino | 39 | Non-EU | 2010 | 0 | 0 | 2013 | €3.0M | |
| 22 | DF | (Turkey) | Hakan | 43 | EU | 2007 | 115 | 6 | 2013 | | Second nationality: Germany |
| 23 | DF | (Turkey) | Serkan | 36 | Non-EU | 2008 | 13 | 0 | 2013 | €1.0M | |
| 25 | MF | (Turkey) | Yekta | 40 | Non-EU | 2011 | 1 | 0 | 2015 | €3.75M | |
| 27 | MF | (Argentina) | Culio | 42 | Non-EU | 2011 | 0 | 0 | 2014 | €2.0M | |
| 28 | FW | (Romania) | Stancu | 39 | EU | 2011 | 1 | 0 | 2015 | €5.0M | |
| 52 | MF | (Turkey) | Emre | 35 | Non-EU | 2010 | 11 | 4 | 2014 | Youth system | |
| 55 | MF | (Turkey) | Sabri (VC) | 42 | Non-EU | 2001 | 254 | 18 | 2012 | Youth system | |
| 66 | FW | (Turkey) | Anıl | 35 | Non-EU | 2011 | 1 | 1 | 2014 | Youth system | |
| 76 | DF | (Turkey) | Servet | 45 | Non-EU | 2007 | 94 | 7 | 2012 | €0.5M | |
| 80 | MF | (Turkey) | Kazım | 39 | EU | 2011 | 1 | 0 | 2014 | Free | Second nationality: England |
| 87 | GK | (Colombia) | Zapata | 47 | Non-EU | 2011 | 0 | 0 | 2012 | Free | |
| 86 | GK | (Turkey) | Ufuk | 40 | Non-EU | 2009 | 3 | 0 | 2014 | | |

- Last updated: 6 January 2011
- Source: Galatasaray.org, Players in / out, and footballdatabase.com (for EU passport)
- Ordered by Last season starting 11 and position on pitch (from back right to front left).

=== Players in / out ===
==== In ====
| No. | Pos. | Nat. | Name | Age | EU | Moving from | Type | Transfer window | Ends | Transfer fee | Source |
|---|---|---|---|---|---|---|---|---|---|---|---|
| 3 | DF | (Turkey) | Çağlar Birinci | 40 | Non-EU | Denizlispor | Transfer | Summer | 2013 | €1.5M + 3 players | Galatasaray.org |
| 4 | DF | (Turkey) | Ali Turan | 42 | Non-EU | Kayserispor | Transfer | Summer | 2013 | Free | Galatasaray.org |
| 6 | DF | (Argentina) | Emiliano Insúa | 37 | EU | Liverpool (England) | Loan | Summer | 2011 | €0.75M | Galatasaray.org |
| 11 | FW | (Turkey) | Mehmet Batdal | 40 | Non-EU | Bucaspor | Transfer | Summer | 2013 | Free | Galatasaray.org |
| 19 | MF | (Albania) | Lorik Cana | 43 | Non-EU | Sunderland (England) | Transfer | Summer | 2014 | €4.5M | Galatasaray.org |
| 20 | MF | (Colombia) | Juan Pablo Pino | 39 | Non-EU | Monaco (France) | Transfer | Summer | 2013 | €3.0M | Galatasaray.org |
| 21 | MF | (Bosnia and Herzegovina) | Zvjezdan Misimović | 44 | EU | VfL Wolfsburg (Germany) | Transfer | Summer | 2014 | €7.0M | Galatasaray.org |
| 35 | MF | (Turkey) | Musa Çağıran | 33 | Non-EU | Altay | Transfer | Summer | 2013 | €0.5M | Galatasaray.org |
| 77 | MF | (Turkey) | Serdar Özkan | 38 | Non-EU | Beşiktaş | Transfer | Summer | 2013 | Free | Galatasaray.org |
| 80 | FW | (Turkey) | Kazım Kazım | 39 | EU | Fenerbahçe | Transfer | Winter | 2014 | Free | Galatasaray.org |
| 27 | MF | (Argentina) | Emmanuel Culio | 42 | Non-EU | CFR Cluj (Romania) | Transfer | Winter | 2014 | €2.0M | Galatasaray.org |
| 25 | MF | (Turkey) | Yekta Kurtuluş | 40 | Non-EU | Kasımpaşa | Transfer | Winter | 2015 | €3.75M | Galatasaray.org |
| 28 | FW | (Romania) | Bogdan Stancu | 39 | EU | Steaua București (Romania) | Transfer | Winter | 2015 | €5.0M | Galatasaray.org |
| 87 | GK | (Colombia) | Róbinson Zapata | 47 | Non-EU | Steaua București (Romania) | Transfer | Winter | 2012 | Free | Galatasaray.org |

Total spending: ▼€28 million

==== Out ====
| No. | Pos. | Nat. | Name | Age | EU | Moving to | Type | Transfer window | Transfer fee | Source |
|---|---|---|---|---|---|---|---|---|---|---|
| 2 | DF | (Turkey) | Emre Güngör | 42 | Non-EU | Gaziantepspor | Transfer | Summer | €1.3M | Galatasaray.org |
| 3 | DF | (Turkey) | Uğur Uçar | 39 | Non-EU | Ankaragücü | Transfer | Summer | €0.65M | Galatasaray.org |
| 11 | FW | (Ivory Coast) | Abdul Kader Keïta | 45 | Non-EU | Al Sadd (Qatar) | Transfer | Summer | €8.15M | Galatasaray.org |
| 14 | MF | (Turkey) | Mehmet Topal | 40 | Non-EU | Valencia (Spain) | Transfer | Summer | €5M | Galatasaray.org |
| 16 | MF | (Argentina) | Marcelo Carrusca | 42 | Non-EU | Banfield (Argentina) | Contract termination | Summer | Free | Galatasaray.org |
| 21 | DF | (Turkey) | Emre Aşık | 52 | Non-EU | Retired | Retired | Summer | Free | |
| 25 | GK | (Argentina) | Leo Franco | 49 | EU | Zaragoza (Spain) | Contract termination | Summer | Free | Galatasaray.org |
| 28 | DF | (Turkey) | Semih Kaya | 35 | Non-EU | Kartalspor | Loan | Summer | N/A | TFF.org |
| 30 | MF | (Mexico) | Giovani dos Santos | 37 | EU | Tottenham Hotspur (England) | Loan return | Summer | N/A | Galatasaray.org |
| 32 | FW | (Brazil) | Jô | 39 | Non-EU | Manchester City (England) | Loan return | Summer | N/A | Galatasaray.org |
| 34 | FW | (Turkey) | Erhan Şentürk | 37 | Non-EU | Kartalspor | Loan | Summer | N/A | TFF.org |
| 39 | MF | (Turkey) | Serdar Eylik | 36 | Non-EU | Denizlispor | Loan | Summer | Part-exchange for Birinci | Galatasaray.org |
| 80 | DF | (Turkey) | Murat Akça | 36 | Non-EU | Denizlispor | Swap | Summer | Part-exchange for Birinci | Galatasaray.org |
| 88 | MF | (Turkey) | Caner Erkin | 37 | Non-EU | CSKA Moscow (Russia) | Loan return | Summer | N/A | Galatasaray.org |
| 90 | DF | (Turkey) | Çetin Güngör | 36 | Non-EU | Şanlıurfaspor | Loan | Summer | N/A | Ajansspor.com |
| 88 | GK | (Turkey) | Fırat Kocaoğlu | 38 | Non-EU | Kasımpaşa | Contract termination | Summer | Free | TFF.org |
| 25 | MF | (Turkey) | Oğuz Sabankay | 39 | Non-EU | Kartalspor | Loan | Summer | N/A | TFF.org |
| 27 | FW | (Turkey) | Özgürcan Özcan | 38 | Non-EU | Adanaspor | Transfer | Summer | €0.15M | Galatasaray.org |
| 9 | MF | (Brazil) | Elano | 45 | EU | Santos (Brazil) | Transfer | Winter | €2.9M | Galatasaray.org |
| 35 | MF | (Turkey) | Musa Çağıran | 33 | Non-EU | Konyaspor | Loan | Winter | N/A | Galatasaray.org |
| 4 | DF | (Turkey) | Ali Turan | 42 | Non-EU | Antalyaspor | Contract termination | Winter | Free | Galatasaray.org |
| 77 | MF | (Turkey) | Serdar Özkan | 38 | Non-EU | MKE Ankaragücü | Contract termination | Winter | Free | Galatasaray.org |
| | MF | (Turkey) | Emre Yüksektepe | 34 | Non-EU | Konyaspor | Loan | Winter | N/A | |
| 11 | MF | (Turkey) | Mehmet Batdal | 40 | Non-EU | Konyaspor | Loan | Winter | N/A | Galatasaray.org |
| 21 | MF | (Bosnia and Herzegovina) | Zvjezdan Misimović | 44 | EU | Dynamo Moscow (Russia) | Contract termination | Winter | N/A | Galatasaray.org |

Total income: ▲€18.15 million.

== Player statistics ==
=== Squad stats ===
| | | | | Total | | | | UEFA Europa League | | Süper Lig | | Türkiye Kupası | | |
| N | Pos. | Name | Nat. | GS | App | Gls | Min | App | Gls | App | Gls | App | Gls | Notes |
|---|---|---|---|---|---|---|---|---|---|---|---|---|---|---|
| 1 | GK | Aykut | (Turkey) | 5 | 6 | -8 | 477 | 3 | -5 | 3 | -3 | | | (−) means goals conceded |
| 12 | GK | Emirhan | (Turkey) | | | | | | | | | | | (−) means goals conceded |
| 86 | GK | Ufuk | (Turkey) | 8 | 8 | -10 | 692 | 1 | -1 | 7 | -9 | | | (−) means goals conceded |
| 2 | DF | Neill | (Australia) | 12 | 12 | | 1035 | 4 | | 8 | | | | |
| 3 | DF | Çağlar | (Turkey) | | | | | | | | | | | |
| 4 | DF | Ali | (Turkey) | 6 | 8 | | 539 | 3 | | 5 | | | | |
| 5 | DF | Gökhan | (Turkey) | 1 | 3 | | 113 | | | 3 | | | | |
| 6 | DF | Insúa | (Argentina) | 5 | 5 | | 450 | | | 5 | | | | |
| 22 | DF | Hakan | (Turkey) | 8 | 8 | | 708 | 4 | | 4 | | | | |
| 23 | DF | Serkan | (Turkey) | 5 | 7 | | 437 | 1 | | 6 | | | | |
| 76 | DF | Servet | (Turkey) | 12 | 12 | 1 | 1080 | 4 | | 8 | 1 | | | |
| 7 | MF | Aydın | (Turkey) | 1 | 7 | 1 | 281 | 1 | 1 | 6 | | | | |
| 8 | MF | Barış | (Turkey) | 5 | 9 | 1 | 495 | 3 | | 6 | 1 | | | |
| 9 | MF | Elano | (Brazil) | 3 | 4 | | 187 | | | 4 | | | | |
| 10 | MF | Arda | (Turkey) | 7 | 7 | 3 | 610 | 4 | 3 | 3 | | | | |
| 16 | MF | Mustafa | (Turkey) | 11 | 12 | 2 | 1004 | 4 | 1 | 8 | 1 | | | |
| 18 | MF | Ayhan | (Turkey) | 13 | 13 | 1 | 1170 | 4 | | 9 | 1 | | | |
| 19 | MF | Cana | (Albania) | 5 | 9 | | 401 | 3 | | 6 | | | | |
| 20 | MF | Pino | (Colombia) | 5 | 8 | | 536 | 2 | | 6 | | | | |
| 21 | MF | Misimović | (Bosnia and Herzegovina) | 6 | 6 | | 452 | | | 6 | | | | |
| 27 | MF | Culio | (Argentina) | | | | | | | | | | | |
| 35 | MF | Musa | (Turkey) | | | | | | | | | | | |
| 52 | MF | Emre | (Turkey) | 1 | 3 | | 85 | 1 | | 2 | | | | |
| 55 | MF | Sabri | (Turkey) | 4 | 6 | | 423 | 2 | | 4 | | | | |
| 77 | MF | Serdar | (Turkey) | 4 | 4 | | 220 | 4 | | | | | | |
| 99 | MF | Kewell | (Australia) | 7 | 9 | 3 | 612 | 3 | 2 | 6 | 1 | | | |
| 11 | FW | Mehmet | (Turkey) | 2 | 5 | 1 | 155 | 3 | 1 | 2 | | | | |
| 40 | FW | Cem | (Turkey) | | | | | | | | | | | |
| 15 | FW | Baroš | (Czech Republic) | 7 | 9 | 8 | 680 | 2 | 2 | 7 | 6 | | | |
| 66 | FW | Anıl | (Turkey) | | | | | | | | | | | |
| 80 | FW | Kazım | (Turkey) | | | | | | | | | | | |

Last updated: 26 October
Source: Onbirim.com
Ordered by position
0 shown as blank

=== Disciplinary record ===
| N | Pos. | Nat. | Name | Yellow card | Second yellow card | Red card | Notes |
|---|---|---|---|---|---|---|---|
| 1 | GK | (Turkey) | Aykut | | | | |
| 12 | GK | (Turkey) | Emirhan | | | | |
| 86 | GK | (Turkey) | Ufuk | | | 1 | |
| 2 | DF | (Australia) | Neill | 3 | | | |
| 3 | DF | (Turkey) | Çağlar | | | | |
| 4 | DF | (Turkey) | Ali Turan | 3 | | | |
| 5 | DF | (Turkey) | Gökhan | 1 | | | |
| 6 | DF | (Argentina) | Insúa | 2 | | | |
| 22 | DF | (Turkey) | Hakan | 2 | | | |
| 23 | DF | (Turkey) | Serkan | 1 | | | |
| 76 | DF | (Turkey) | Servet | 1 | | | |
| 7 | MF | (Turkey) | Aydın | | | | |
| 8 | MF | (Turkey) | Barış | 3 | | | |
| 9 | MF | (Brazil) | Elano | 1 | | | |
| 10 | MF | (Turkey) | Arda | 1 | | | |
| 16 | MF | (Turkey) | Mustafa | 2 | | | |
| 18 | MF | (Turkey) | Ayhan | 5 | | | |
| 19 | MF | (Albania) | Cana | 2 | | | |
| 20 | MF | (Colombia) | Pino | 3 | | | |
| 21 | MF | (Bosnia and Herzegovina) | Misimović | | | | |
| 27 | DF | (Argentina) | Culio | | | | |
| 35 | MF | (Turkey) | Musa | | | | |
| 52 | MF | (Turkey) | Emre | | | | |
| 55 | MF | (Turkey) | Sabri | | | | |
| 77 | MF | (Turkey) | Serdar | | | | |
| 99 | MF | (Australia) | Kewell | 3 | | | |
| 11 | FW | (Turkey) | Mehmet | | | | |
| 15 | FW | (Czech Republic) | Baroš | 2 | | | |
| 40 | FW | (Turkey) | Cem | | | | |
| 66 | FW | (Turkey) | Anıl | | | | |
| 80 | FW | (Turkey) | Kazım | | | | |

Last updated: 26 October
Source: Competitive matches
Only competitive matches
(yellow card) = Number of bookings; (second yellow card) = Number of sending offs after a second yellow card; (red card) = Number of sending offs by a direct red card.

== Club ==
=== Board of directors ===
| Position | Staff |
|---|---|
| President | (Turkey) Adnan Polat |
| Deputy President | (Turkey) Mehmet Helvacı |
| Vice-President & Finance | (Turkey) Yiğit Şardan |
| Vice-President & Football Committee | (Turkey) Haldun Üstünel |
| | (Turkey) Ali Haşhaş |
| General Secretary | (Turkey) Işın Çelebi |
| Marketing & Riding | (Turkey) Cemal Özgörkey |
| | (Turkey) Hakan Üstünberk |
| | (Turkey) Vedat Eşkinat |
| Real Estate | (Turkey) İbrahim Çağlar |
| | (Turkey) Doğan Yalçınkaya |
| Football Management Trade Manager | (Turkey) Adnan Sezgin |
| Football Committee | (Turkey) Murat Yalçındağ |
| | (Turkey) Yalçın Orhon |
| | (Turkey) Selim Sayılgan |
| | (Turkey) Emir Sarıgül |

Last updated: 20 October
Source: Galatasaray.org

=== Technical staff ===
| Position | Staff |
|---|---|
| Head Coach (until 20 October 2010) | (Netherlands) Frank Rijkaard |
| Head Coach (from 23 October 2010, until 24 March 2011) | (Romania) Gheorghe Hagi |
| Head Coach (from 25 March 2011) | (Turkey) Bülent Ünder |
| Assistant Coach (until 20 October 2010) | (Netherlands) Johan Neeskens |
| Assistant Coach (from 23 October 2010) | (Turkey) Tugay Kerimoğlu |
| Assistant Coach (from 23 October 2010, until 24 March 2011) | (Romania) Bogdan Vintila |
| Fitness Coach (until 20 October 2010) | (Spain) Albert Roca Puyol (Spain) Carlos Cuadrat Xiqués |
| Fitness Coach (from 23 October 2010, until 24 March 2011) | (Italy) Giovanni Melchiorre |
| Fitness Coach | (Turkey) Fatih Yıldız |
| Goalkeeping Coach | (Turkey) Nezih Ali Boloğlu |

Last updated: 24 March
Source: Galatasaray.org

=== Medical staff ===
| Position | Staff |
|---|---|
| Doctor | (Turkey) Murat Çevik |
| Physiotherapist | (Turkey) Burak Koca (Turkey) Cumhur Erol |
| Masseur | (Turkey) Erkan Kazancı (Turkey) Sedat Peker (Turkey) Serdal Yıldız |

Last updated: 20 October
Source: Galatasaray.org

== Pre-season and friendlies ==
Kickoff times are in CET.

| 13 July 2010 Friendly | Kleve (Germany) | 0–4 | (Turkey) Galatasaray | Kleve, Germany |
| 19:00 | | (Report) | 22' Baroš; 40' Özbek; 51' Öztel; 70' Batdal | Stadium: Volksbank-Arena |

| 15 July 2010 Friendly | Homberg (Germany) | 0–5 | (Turkey) Galatasaray | Duisburg, Germany |
| 19:00 | | (Report) | Batdal 8'; Özkan 12'; Arda Turan 40'; Sarp 55'; Kesim 59' | Stadium: PCC-Stadion |

| 18 July 2010 Friendly | Galatasaray (Turkey) | 4–0 | (Iran) PAS Hamedan |
| 19:00 | Çağıran 7'; Özbek 50'; Batdal 53', 68' | (Report) |

| 21 July 2010 Friendly | Galatasaray (Turkey) | 0–1 | (Turkey) Fenerbahçe | Mönchengladbach, Germany |
| 20:00 | | (Report) | Santos 29' | Stadium: Borussia-Park; Attendance: 34,191 |

| 24 July 2010 Friendly | Hasselt (Belgium) | 0–2 | (Turkey) Galatasaray |
| 19:00 | | (Report) | Arda Turan 12'; Çolak 77' |

== Competitions ==
=== Overall ===
| Competition | Started round | Current position / round | Final position / round | First match | Last match |
|---|---|---|---|---|---|
| Süper Lig | — | 8th | | 14 August 2010 | 22 May 2011 |
| Türkiye Kupası | — | — | Quarter-final | 10 November 2010 | 2 March 2011 |
| UEFA Europa League | Third qualifying round | — | Play-off round | 29 July 2010 | 26 August 2010 |

Updated to match played 21 May 2011
Source: Competitions

=== Süper Lig ===
==== Standings ====
| Pos | Team | Pld | W | D | L | GF | GA | GD | Pts |
|---|---|---|---|---|---|---|---|---|---|
| 6 | Kayserispor | 34 | 14 | 9 | 11 | 46 | 44 | +2 | 51 |
| 7 | Eskişehirspor | 34 | 12 | 11 | 11 | 41 | 40 | +1 | 47 |
| 8 | Galatasaray | 34 | 14 | 4 | 16 | 41 | 46 | −5 | 46 |
| 9 | Kardemir Karabükspor | 34 | 12 | 8 | 14 | 46 | 53 | −7 | 44 |
| 10 | Manisaspor | 34 | 13 | 4 | 17 | 49 | 52 | −3 | 43 |

Source: tff.org (in Turkish)
Rules for classification: 1) points; 2) goal difference; 3) number of goals scored.

==== Results summary ====
| Overall | | | | | | | | Home | | | | | | Away | | | | | |
| Pld | W | D | L | GF | GA | GD | Pts | W | D | L | GF | GA | GD | W | D | L | GF | GA | GD |
|---|---|---|---|---|---|---|---|---|---|---|---|---|---|---|---|---|---|---|---|
| 34 | 14 | 4 | 16 | 41 | 46 | −5 | 46 | 8 | 2 | 7 | 22 | 21 | +1 | 6 | 2 | 9 | 19 | 25 | −6 |

Source: Competitive Matches

==== Results by round ====
| Round | 1 | 2 | 3 | 4 | 5 | 6 | 7 | 8 | 9 | 10 | 11 | 12 | 13 | 14 | 15 | 16 | 17 | 18 | 19 | 20 | 21 | 22 | 23 | 24 | 25 | 26 | 27 | 28 | 29 | 30 | 31 | 32 | 33 | 34 |
|---|---|---|---|---|---|---|---|---|---|---|---|---|---|---|---|---|---|---|---|---|---|---|---|---|---|---|---|---|---|---|---|---|---|---|
| Ground | A | H | A | H | A | H | A | H | A | H | A | H | A | H | A | H | A | H | A | H | A | H | A | H | A | H | A | H | A | H | A | H | A | H |
| Result | L | L | W | W | W | W | L | L | D | W | L | L | D | L | W | L | W | W | L | W | L | W | L | D | L | L | L | L | W | D | L | W | W | W |
| Position | 12 | 17 | 12 | 7 | 7 | 3 | 7 | 9 | 9 | 8 | 9 | 10 | 10 | 10 | 9 | 10 | 9 | 7 | 10 | 8 | 10 | 8 | 10 | 11 | 11 | 11 | 13 | 14 | 13 | 12 | 14 | 12 | 9 | 8 |

Source: Competitive Matches
A = Away; H = Home; W = Win; D = Draw; L = Loss

==== Matches ====
Kickoff times are in EET.

| 14 August 2010 1 | Sivasspor | 2–1 | Galatasaray | Sivas |
| 20:00 | Ivanovs (yellow card) 17'; Zita 42'; Yılmaz 60'; Dereli (yellow card) 69' | (Report) (Referee report) | M.Sarp 7'; Gökhan Zan (yellow card) 43'; Ali Turan (yellow card) 61'; Cana (yellow card) 64'; Baroš (yellow card) 89' | Stadium: Sivas 4 Eylül Stadium; Referee: Mustafa Kamil Abitoğlu |

| 22 August 2010 2 | Galatasaray | 0–2 | Bursaspor | Istanbul |
| 21:00 | Baroš (yellow card) 43'; Ayhan (yellow card) 44'; Elano (yellow card) 75'; Kewell (yellow card) 76' | (Report) (Referee report) | Ergić 15', 83'; Volkan Şen (yellow card) 20'; Hüseyin (yellow card) 69'; Ivankov (yellow card) 85' | Stadium: Ali Sami Yen Stadium; Referee: Abdullah Yılmaz |

| 29 August 2010 3 | Eskişehirspor | 1–3 | Galatasaray | Eskişehir |
| 22:00 | Vučko 37'; Batuhan (yellow card) 42'; Koray (yellow card) 44'; Adem (yellow card) 81' | (Report) (Referee report) | Baroš 4'; Volkan 68' (o.g.); Servet 71'; Neill (yellow card) 86' | Stadium: Eskişehir Atatürk Stadium; Referee: Kuddusi Müftüoğlu |

| 13 September 2010 4 | Galatasaray | 1–0 | Gaziantepspor | Istanbul |
| 21:30 | Kewell (yellow card) 52' (goal) 60' (pen.) | (Report) (Referee report) | Popov (yellow card) 48'; Elyasa (yellow card) 50'; Yalçın (yellow card) 86'; Ivan (yellow card) 88' | Stadium: Ali Sami Yen Stadium; Referee: Bünyamin Gezer |

| 18 September 2010 5 | Bucaspor | 0–1 | Galatasaray | İzmir |
| 20:30 | Erkan (yellow card) 28'; Ragıp (yellow card) 65'; Emre (yellow card) 88'; İbrahim (yellow card) 89' | (Report) (Referee report) | Insúa (yellow card) 42'; Ayhan 69' | Stadium: İzmir Atatürk Stadium; Referee: Halis Özkahya |

| 26 September 2010 6 | Galatasaray | 3–1 | İstanbul BB | Istanbul |
| 19:00 | Baroš 5', 12', 41'; Cana (yellow card) 18'; Pino (yellow card) 59'; Ayhan (yellow card) 64'; B.Özbek (yellow card) 80'; S.Kurtuluş (yellow card) 89' | (Report) (Referee report) | Rızvan (yellow card) 11'; Ekrem (yellow card) 59'; Metin (yellow card) 59'; Tum 66'; İbrahim Akın (yellow card) 81' | Stadium: Ali Sami Yen Stadium; Referee: Bülent Yıldırım |

| 1 October 2010 7 | Karabükspor | 2–1 | Galatasaray | Karabük |
| 20:00 | Cernat 2' (pen.); Hakan Özmert 11'; Šerić (yellow card) 17'; Deumi (yellow card) 65' | (Report) (Referee report) | Insúa (yellow card) 10'; B.Özbek (yellow card) 11' (goal) 75'; Pino (yellow card) 90' | Stadium: Dr. Necmettin Şeyhoğlu Stadium; Referee: Aytekin Durmaz |

| 17 October 2010 8 | Galatasaray | 2–4 | Ankaragücü | Istanbul |
| 19:00 | Baroš 57', 64'; Ufuk (red card) 60'; M.Sarp (yellow card) 80'; Ayhan (yellow card) 81'; Hakan Balta (yellow card) 88' | (Report) (Referee report) | Metin 3'; Özgür 51'; Šesták 60'; Klukowski (yellow card) 72'; Turgut 89' | Stadium: Ali Sami Yen Stadium; Referee: Tolga Özkalfa |

| 24 October 2010 9 | Fenerbahçe | 0–0 | Galatasaray | Istanbul |
| 19:00 | Emre (yellow card) 35'; Lugano (yellow card) 68' | (Report) (Referee report) | Neill (yellow card) 24'; Ayhan (yellow card) 42'; Pino (yellow card) 83' | Stadium: Şükrü Saracoğlu Stadium; Referee: Bülent Yıldırım |

| 30 October 2010 10 | Galatasaray | 2–1 | Antalyaspor | Istanbul |
| 19:00 | | (Report) (Referee report) | | Stadium: Ali Sami Yen Stadium; Referee: Bünyamin Gezer |

| 7 November 2010 11 | Trabzonspor | 2–0 | Galatasaray | Trabzon |
| 19:00 | | (Report) | | Stadium: Hüseyin Avni Aker Stadium |

| 14 November 2010 12 | Galatasaray | 0–2 | Manisaspor | Istanbul |
| 19:00 | | (Report) | | Stadium: Ali Sami Yen Stadium |

| 21 November 2010 13 | Kayserispor | 0–0 | Galatasaray | Kayseri |
| 19:00 | | (Report) | | Stadium: Kadir Has Stadium |

| 28 November 2010 14 | Galatasaray | 1–2 | Beşiktaş | Istanbul |
| 19:00 | | (Report) | | Stadium: Ali Sami Yen Stadium |

| 4 December 2010 15 | Kasımpaşa | 0–3 | Galatasaray | Istanbul |
| | | (Report) | | Stadium: Recep Tayyip Erdoğan Stadium |

| 11 December 2010 16 | Galatasaray | 0–2 | Gençlerbirliği | Istanbul |
| | | (Report) | | Stadium: Ali Sami Yen Stadium |

| 19 December 2010 17 | Konyaspor | 0–1 | Galatasaray | Konya |
| | | (Report) | | Stadium: Konya Atatürk Stadium |

| 23 January 2011 18 | Galatasaray | 1–0 | Sivasspor | Istanbul |
| | | (Report) | | Stadium: Türk Telekom Arena; Attendance: 43,910 |

| 30 January 2011 19 | Bursaspor | 2–0 | Galatasaray | Bursa |
| | | (Report) | | Stadium: Bursa Atatürk Stadium |

| 6 February 2011 20 | Galatasaray | 4–2 | Eskişehirspor | Istanbul |
| | | (Report) | | Stadium: Türk Telekom Arena; Attendance: 31,890 |

| 13 February 2011 21 | Gaziantepspor | 1–0 | Galatasaray | Gaziantep |
| | | (Report) | | Stadium: Gaziantep Kamil Ocak Stadium |

| 20 February 2011 22 | Galatasaray | 1–0 | Bucaspor | Istanbul |
| | | (Report) | | Stadium: Türk Telekom Arena; Attendance: 26,100 |

| 27 February 2011 23 | İstanbul BB | 3–1 | Galatasaray | Istanbul |
| | | (Report) | | Stadium: Atatürk Olympic Stadium |

| 6 March 2011 24 | Galatasaray | 0–0 | Karabükspor | Istanbul |
| | | (Report) | | Stadium: Türk Telekom Arena; Attendance: 23,400 |

| 13 March 2011 25 | Ankaragücü | 3–2 | Galatasaray | Ankara |
| | | (Report) | | Stadium: Ankara 19 Mayıs Stadium |

| 20 March 2011 26 | Galatasaray | 1–2 | Fenerbahçe | Istanbul |
| | | (Report) | | Stadium: Türk Telekom Arena; Attendance: 51,393 |

| 4 April 2011 27 | Antalyaspor | 3–0 | Galatasaray | Antalya |
| 20:00 | | (Report) | | Stadium: Antalya Atatürk Stadium |

| 10 April 2011 28 | Galatasaray | 0–1 | Trabzonspor | Istanbul |
| 19:00 | | (Report) | | Stadium: Türk Telekom Arena; Attendance: - |

| 17 April 2011 29 | Manisaspor | 2–3 | Galatasaray | Manisa |
| 20:00 | | (Report) | | Stadium: Manisa 19 Mayıs Stadium |

| 24 April 2011 30 | Galatasaray | 1–1 | Kayserispor | Istanbul |
| 20:00 | | (Report) | | Stadium: Türk Telekom Arena; Attendance: 25,000 |

| 1 May 2011 31 | Beşiktaş | 2–0 | Galatasaray | Istanbul |
| 19:00 | | (Report) | | Stadium: BJK İnönü Stadium |

| 8 May 2011 32 | Galatasaray | 3–1 | Kasımpaşa | Istanbul |
| 20:00 | | (Report) | | Stadium: Türk Telekom Arena; Attendance: 7,517 |

| 15 May 2011 33 | Gençlerbirliği | 2–3 | Galatasaray | Ankara |
| 20:00 | | (Report) | | Stadium: Ankara 19 Mayıs Stadium |

| 20 May 2011 34 | Galatasaray | 2–0 | Konyaspor | Istanbul |
| 20:00 | | (Report) | | Stadium: Türk Telekom Arena; Attendance: - |

==== Turkish Cup ====
===== Group stage =====
| Pos | Team | Pld | W | D | L | GF | GA | GD | Pts |
|---|---|---|---|---|---|---|---|---|---|
| 1 | Gaziantepspor | 4 | 3 | 1 | 0 | 7 | 2 | +5 | 10 |
| 2 | Galatasaray | 4 | 2 | 2 | 0 | 7 | 3 | +4 | 8 |
| 3 | Beypazarı Şekerspor | 4 | 1 | 1 | 2 | 4 | 7 | −3 | 4 |
| 4 | Antalyaspor | 4 | 0 | 3 | 1 | 4 | 6 | −2 | 3 |
| 5 | Denizlispor | 4 | 0 | 1 | 3 | 4 | 8 | −4 | 1 |

Source: tff.org (in Turkish)
Rules for classification: 1) points; 2) goal difference; 3) number of goals scored.

| 10 November 2010 1 | Galatasaray | 3–1 | Denizlispor | Istanbul |
| 20:00 | | (Report) | | Stadium: Ali Sami Yen Stadium |

| 22 December 2010 2 | Gaziantepspor | 1–1 | Galatasaray | Gaziantep |
| 20:15 | | (Report) | | Stadium: Gaziantep Kamil Ocak Stadium |

| 12 January 2011 3 | Galatasaray | 3–1 | Beypazarı Şekerspor | Istanbul |
| 21:30 | | (Report) | | Stadium: Ali Sami Yen Stadium |

| 26 January 2011 4 | Antalyaspor | 0–0 | Galatasaray | Antalya |
| 20:00 | | (Report) | | Stadium: Mardan Sports Complex |

===== Quarter-finals =====
| 3 February 2011 First leg | Gaziantepspor | 3–2 | Galatasaray | Gaziantep |
| 20:00 | | (Report) | | Stadium: Gaziantep Kamil Ocak Stadium |

| 2 March 2011 Second leg | Galatasaray | 0–0 (2–3 agg.) | Gaziantepspor | Istanbul |
| 20:00 | | (Report) | | Stadium: Türk Telekom Arena; Attendance: 31,930 |

==== UEFA Europa League ====
===== Third qualifying round =====
| 29 July 2010 First leg | Galatasaray (Turkey) | 2–2 | (Serbia) OFK Beograd | Istanbul, Turkey |
| 20:00 | Arda 26', 76'; Neill (yellow card) 89' | (Report) | Simić (yellow card) 51'; Marković (yellow card) 61'; Krstić 80'; Injac 86' | Stadium: Ali Sami Yen Stadium; Attendance: 15,703; Referee: Nicolai Vollquartz (Denmark) |

| 5 August 2010 Second leg | OFK Beograd (Serbia) | 1–5 (3–7 agg.) | (Turkey) Galatasaray | Belgrade, Serbia |
| 17:00 | Nikolić 32' (yellow card) 45+2' (red card) 57'; Trivunović (yellow card) 40'; Sinđić (yellow card) 90+2' | (Report) | M.Sarp 12' (yellow card) 40'; Kewell 22', 57' (pen.) (yellow card) 67'; Ayhan (yellow card) 36'; Arda 71'; M.Batdal 81' | Stadium: Omladinski Stadium; Attendance: 6,000; Referee: Daniel Stalhammar (Sweden) |

===== Play-off round =====
| 19 August 2010 First leg | Galatasaray (Turkey) | 2–2 | (Ukraine) Karpaty Lviv | Istanbul, Turkey |
| 20:00 | Ali Turan (yellow card) 28'; B.Özbek (yellow card) 56'; Baroš 59', 86' | (Report) | Kuznetsov 34'; Zenjov 41'; Khudobyak (yellow card) 64'; Godwin (yellow card) 90' | Stadium: Ali Sami Yen Stadium; Attendance: 15,182; Referee: Mark Clattenburg (England) |

| 26 August 2010 Second leg | Karpaty Lviv (Ukraine) | 1–1 (3a–3 agg.) | (Turkey) Galatasaray | Lviv, Ukraine |
| 20:45 | Fedetskiy (yellow card) 4' (yellow-red card) 90+4' (goal) 90+3'; Kuznetsov (red card) 71'; Tlumak (yellow card) 89' | (Report) | Hakan Balta (yellow card) 38'; Arda (yellow card) 41'; Servet (yellow card) 74'; Ali Turan (yellow card) 75'; Aydın 90+1' | Stadium: Ukraina Stadium; Attendance: 25,000; Referee: Thorsten Kinhöfer (Germany) |

== Attendance ==
| Competition | Av. Att. | Total Att. |
|---|---|---|
| Süper Lig | 29,887 | 209,210 |
| Türkiye Kupası | 31,930 | 31,930 |
| Europa League | 15,443 | 30,886 |
| Total | 27,203 | 272,026 |

- Sold season tickets: 20,000
