= 2011–12 Galatasaray S.K. season =

Galatasaray
2011–12 season
- President: Ünal Aysal
- Head coach: Fatih Terim
- Stadium: Türk Telekom Arena
- Süper Lig: 1st
- Süper Final: Winners
- Turkish Cup: Fourth round
- Top goalscorer: League: Selçuk İnan (13); All: Selçuk İnan (13)
- Highest home attendance: 51,567 vs Fenerbahçe (Süper Lig, 22 April 2012)
- Lowest home attendance: 12,877 vs Antalyaspor (Süper Lig, 1 February 2012)
- Average home league attendance: 34,685
Home colours	Away colours	Third colours

The 2011–12 season was Galatasaray's 108th in existence and the club's 54th consecutive season in the Süper Lig. This article shows statistics of the club's players in the season, and also lists all matches that the club played in during the season.

== Season overview ==
Ünal Aysal was elected as the new president of Galatasaray in May 2011. After his election, he made an agreement with coach Fatih Terim for the 2011–12 season. The club signed Swedish international striker Johan Elmander for three seasons from Bolton Wanderers on a free transfer.

== Club ==
=== Coaching staff ===
Position	Name
Manager	(Turkey) Fatih Terim
Assistant manager	(Turkey) Hasan Şaş
Assistant manager	(Turkey) Ümit Davala
Fitness Coach	(United States) Scott Piri
Trainer	(Turkey) Metin Çakıroğlu
Fitness Coach	(Turkey) Fatih Yıldız
Goalkeeping coach	(Brazil) Cláudio Taffarel

=== Board of directors ===
Position	Staff
President	(Turkey) Ünal Aysal
Deputy President	(Turkey) Ali Dürüst
Vice-President	(Turkey) Refik Arkan
Vice-President	(Turkey) Adnan Öztürk
General Secretary	(Turkey) Aka Gündüz Özdemir
	(Turkey) Adnan Nas
	(Turkey) Semih Haznedaroğlu
	(Turkey) Sedat Doğan
	(Turkey) Celal Gürcan
	(Turkey) Mete Başol
	(Turkey) Ali Gürsoy
	(Turkey) Ahmet Ocaklı
	(Turkey) Abdürrahim Albayrak
	(Turkey) Emir Sarıgül
	(Turkey) Mehmet Cibara
	(Turkey) Necati Demirkol

=== Medical staff ===
Position	Staff
Doctor	(Turkey) Dr. Sarper Çetinkaya
Doctor	(Turkey) Dr. Barış Çakır

=== Other personnel ===
Football Management Trade I.C.
Position	Name
General director	Sedef Köksal
Sportive Coordinator	Bülent Tulun
Financial and Administrative Affairs Director	Sedef Hacısalihoğlu
Competition and External Relations Director	Yeşim Toroslu
Florya Metin Oktay Facilities Director	Fahri Yılmaz
Manager of Team	Cenk Ergün
Executive Assistant	Ezgi Ekiz

=== Grounds ===
Ground (capacity and dimensions)	Türk Telekom Arena (52,652 / 105x68m)
Training ground	Florya Metin Oktay Sports Complex and Training Center

=== Kit ===
Uniform Manufacturer: Nike

Chest Advertising's: Türk Telekom

Back Advertising's: Ülker

Arm Advertising's: Avea

Short Advertising's: Nikon

Home
Away
Third
Goalkeeper 1
Goalkeeper 2
Goalkeeper 3

== Sponsorship ==
Companies that Galatasaray S.K. currently has sponsorship deals with include.

Licensee	Product
Türk Telekom	Main Sponsor
Nike	Technical Sponsor
Avea	Official Sponsor
Ülker	Official Sponsor
Turkish Airlines	Official Sponsor
Hedef Filo Hizmetleri	Official Sponsor
HDI-Gerling	Official Sponsor
Medical Park	Official Sponsor
Bilyoner	Official Sponsor
Yurtiçi Kargo	Official Sponsor
Sarar	Official Sponsor
JohnsonDiversey	Official Sponsor
GNC	Official Supplier

Licensee	Product
Nikon	Official Sponsor
Powerade	Official Sponsor
Zorlu Holding	Home textile
Tiglon	DVD & VCD
Panini	Collectible stickers
Konami	Computer game
Electronic Arts	Computer game
Athletes’ Performance	Official Sponsor

== Players ==
=== Squad information ===
N	Pos.	Nat.	Name	Age	EU	Since	App	Goals	Ends	Transfer fee	Notes
1	GK	(Turkey)	Aykut Erçetin	43	EU	2003	58	0	2012	Free	
3	DF	(Turkey)	Çağlar Birinci	40	Non-EU	2010	15	0	2013	€1.5M	
5	DF	(Turkey)	Gökhan Zan	44	Non-EU	2009	40	2	2014	Free	
6	MF	(Turkey)	Ceyhun Gülselam	38	EU	2011	13	0	2014	Free	
7	MF	(Turkey)	Aydın Yılmaz	38	Non-EU	2006	91	6	2013	Youth system	
8	MF	(Turkey)	Selçuk İnan	41	Non-EU	2011	40	13	2016	Free	
9	FW	(Sweden)	Johan Elmander	45	EU	2011	36	12	2014	Free	
10	MF	(Brazil)	Felipe Melo	43	EU	2011	36	12	2012	€1.5M	On loan from Juventus
11	MF	(Spain)	Albert Riera	44	EU	2011	32	1	2015	€3M	
15	FW	(Czech Republic)	Milan Baroš	44	EU	2008	112	59	2013	€5.5M	
17	DF	(Czech Republic)	Tomáš Ujfaluši	48	EU	2011	40	1	2013	€1.5M	
18	MF	(Turkey)	Ayhan Akman (VC)	49	Non-EU	2001	210	8	2012	€0.5M	
19	FW	(Turkey)	Mehmet Batdal	40	Non-EU	2010	14	1	2013	Free	
20	DF	(Turkey)	Serkan Kurtuluş	36	Non-EU	2008	32	0	2013	€1.0M	
21	FW	(Turkey)	Yiğit Gökoğlan	37	Non-EU	2012	8	1	2016	€2.5M	
22	DF	(Turkey)	Hakan Balta	43	EU	2007	174	8	2013	€1M + Ferhat Öztorun	
25	GK	(Uruguay)	Fernando Muslera	40	EU	2011	39	1	2016	€6.75M + Lorik Cana	
26	DF	(Turkey)	Semih Kaya	35	Non-EU	2008	35	1	2016	Youth system	
27	DF	(Ivory Coast)	Emmanuel Eboué	43	EU	2011	32	3	2015	€3.5M	
35	MF	(Turkey)	Yekta Kurtuluş	40	Non-EU	2011	17	0	2015	€3.75M	
50	MF	(Turkey)	Engin Baytar	43	EU	2011	35	2	2013	€1.1M	
52	MF	(Turkey)	Emre Çolak	35	Non-EU	2009	57	6	2016	Youth system	
55	MF	(Turkey)	Sabri Sarıoğlu (C)	42	Non-EU	2002	237	14	2012	Youth system	
76	DF	(Turkey)	Servet Çetin (VC)	45	Non-EU	2007	175	12	2012	€0.5M	
77	FW	(Turkey)	Necati Ateş	46	Non-EU	2012	132	63	2012	€0.25M + Aydın Yılmaz	
86	GK	(Turkey)	Ufuk Ceylan	40	Non-EU	2009	27	0	2014	€1M + 3 Players	
90	FW	(Turkey)	Sercan Yıldırım	36	Non-EU	2011	21	3	2016	€3M + Musa Çağıran	

- Last updated: 12 May 2012
- Source: Galatasaray.org, Players in / out, and footballdatabase.com (for EU passport)
- Ordered by Last season starting 11 and position on pitch (from back right to front left).

=== Transfers ===
==== In ====
No.	Pos.	Nat.	Name	Age	EU	Moving from	Type	Transfer window	Ends	Transfer fee	Source
9	FW	(Sweden)	Johan Elmander	45	EU	Bolton Wanderers (England)	Transfer	Summer	2014	Free	Galatasaray.org
8	MF	(Turkey)	Selçuk İnan	41	Non-EU	Trabzonspor	Transfer	Summer	2016	Free	Galatasaray.org
6	MF	(Turkey)	Ceyhun Gülselam	38	EU	Trabzonspor	Transfer	Summer	2014	Free	Galatasaray.org
17	DF	(Czech Republic)	Tomáš Ujfaluši	48	EU	Atlético Madrid (Spain)	Transfer	Summer	2013	€2M	Galatasaray.org
39	FW	(Turkey)	Okan Derici	33	EU	Eintracht Frankfurt (Germany)	Transfer	Summer	2014	€0.20M	Galatasaray.org
25	GK	(Uruguay)	Fernando Muslera	40	EU	Lazio (Italy)	Transfer	Summer	2016	€6.75M + Lorik Cana	Galatasaray.org
10	MF	(Brazil)	Felipe Melo	43	EU	Juventus (Italy)	Loan	Summer	2012	€1.5M	Galatasaray.org
27	DF	(Ivory Coast)	Emmanuel Eboué	43	EU	Arsenal (England)	Transfer	Summer	2015	€ 3.5M	Galatasaray.org
50	MF	(Turkey)	Engin Baytar	43	EU	Trabzonspor	Transfer	Summer	2013	€1.1M	Galatasaray.org
11	MF	(Spain)	Albert Riera	44	EU	Olympiacos (Greece)	Transfer	Summer	2015	€3M	Galatasaray.org
90	FW	(Turkey)	Sercan Yıldırım	36	Non-EU	Bursaspor	Transfer	Summer	2016	€3M + Musa Çağıran	Galatasaray.org
21	MF	(Turkey)	Yiğit Gökoğlan	37	Non-EU	Manisaspor	Transfer	Winter	2016	€2.5M	Galatasaray.org
19	FW	(Turkey)	Mehmet Batdal	40	Non-EU	Kardemir Karabükspor	Loan return	Winter	2013	N/A	Galatasaray.org
77	FW	(Turkey)	Necati Ateş	46	Non-EU	Antalyaspor	Transfer	Winter	2013	€0.25M + 1 player*	Galatasaray.org

Total spending: ▼€23.80 million

* - 1 player will leave the club at the end of the 2011-2012 season.

==== Out ====
No.	Pos.	Nat.	Name	Age	EU	Moving to	Type	Transfer window	Transfer fee	Source
6	DF	(Argentina)	Emiliano Insúa	37	EU	Liverpool (England)	Loan return	Summer	Free	Liverpoolfc.tv
99	MF	(Australia)	Harry Kewell	47	EU	Melbourne Victory (Australia)	End of contract	Summer	Free	Melbournevictory.com.au
2	DF	(Australia)	Lucas Neill	48	EU	Al Jazira (United Arab Emirates)	End of contract	Summer	Free	Jc.ae
8	DF	(Turkey)	Barış Özbek	39	EU	Trabzonspor	End of contract	Summer	Free	Trabzonspor.org.tr
87	GK	(Colombia)	Róbinson Zapata	47	Non-EU	Deportivo Pereira (Colombia)	Contract termination	Summer	Free	Galatasaray.org
19	MF	(Albania)	Lorik Cana	43	Non-EU	Lazio (Italy)	Transfer	Summer	Exchange with Fernando Muslera	Galatasaray.org
40	FW	(Turkey)	Cem Sultan	35	Non-EU	Kayserispor	End of contract	Summer	Free	
34	FW	(Turkey)	Erhan Şentürk	37	Non-EU	Karşıyaka	Loan	Summer	N/A	
39	MF	(Turkey)	Serdar Eylik	36	Non-EU	Karşıyaka	Loan	Summer	N/A	
	DF	(Turkey)	Uğur Demirok	38	Non-EU	Akhisar Belediyespor	End of contract	Summer	Free	Akhisarspor.com
27	MF	(Argentina)	Emmanuel Culio	42	EU	Orduspor	Loan	Summer	€0.35M	Galatasaray.org
10	MF	(Turkey)	Arda Turan	39	Non-EU	Atlético Madrid (Spain)	Transfer	Summer	€12M*	Galatasaray.org
11	FW	(Turkey)	Mehmet Batdal	40	Non-EU	Karabükspor	Loan	Summer	N/A	Galatasaray.org
28	FW	(Romania)	Bogdan Stancu	39	EU	Orduspor	Loan	Summer	€0.35M	Galatasaray.org
20	MF	(Colombia)	Juan Pablo Pino	39	Non-EU	Al-Nassr (Saudi Arabia)	Loan	Summer	€0.4M	Galatasaray.org
91	DF	(Turkey)	Berk Neziroğulları	35	Non-EU	Adanaspor	End of contract	Summer	Free	Webaslan.com
16	MF	(Turkey)	Mustafa Sarp	45	Non-EU	Samsunspor	Contract termination	Summer	Free	Galatasaray.org
66	FW	(Turkey)	Anıl Dilaver	35	Non-EU	Samsunspor	Loan	Summer	€0.1M	Galatasaray.org
69	MF	(Turkey)	Cumhur Yılmaztürk	36	Non-EU	Çaykur Rizespor	Contract termination	Summer	Free	Dha.com.tr
61	MF	(Turkey)	Caner Öztel	35	Non-EU	Çaykur Rizespor	End of contract	Summer	Free	
	DF	(Turkey)	Çetin Güngör	36	Non-EU	Gaziantepspor	End of contract	Summer	Free	Gaziantepspor.org.tr
	MF	(Turkey)	Musa Çağıran	33	Non-EU	Bursaspor	Transfer	Summer	Exchange with Sercan Yıldırım	Galatasaray.org
80	FW	(Turkey)	Kazım	39	EU	Olympiacos (Greece)	Loan	Winter	€0.875M	Galatasaray.org

Total income: ▲€14.1M

Expenditure: ▼€9.70M

* - if Atletico Madrid finishes La Liga as a UEFA Champions League participant: €1M bonus fee. If they finishes La Liga as a UEFA Europa League participant: €0.5M bonus fee.

== Friendly matches ==
Win Draw Loss

=== Pre-season ===
Galatasaray start the 2011-12 season with a training session to be held in Florya on Monday June 27, 2011. On July 2, Galatasaray will be leaving for Austria in order to camp near the town of Wörgl until July 12.

The second summer camp of Galatasaray is planned to be in Germany.

Kickoff times are in CET.

8 July 2011 Friendly	Galatasaray (Turkey)	2–1	(Germany) Türkiyemspor Berlin	Kufstein, Austria
20:00	Kurtuluş 11'; Derici 42'	Report	Tokgöz 30'

10 July 2011 Friendly	SpVgg Unterhaching (Germany)	1–1	(Turkey) Galatasaray	Munich, Germany
18:00	Niederlechner 55'	Report	Kazim-Richards 52'	Stadium: Generali Sportpark

17 July 2011 Friendly	Galatasaray (Turkey)	3–0	(Turkey) Akhisar Belediyespor	Istanbul, Turkey
19:00	Baroš; Elmander	Report		Stadium: Florya Metin Oktay Sports Complex and Training Center

20 July 2011 Friendly	Galatasaray (Turkey)	0–1	(Netherlands) Twente	Osnabrück, Germany
20:00		Report	Bengtsson 77'	Stadium: Osnatel Arena

24 July 2011 Friendly	Galatasaray (Turkey)	0–0	(Italy) Internazionale	Bochum, Germany
18:00		Report		Stadium: Ruhrstadion; Attendance: 26,179

28 July 2011 Friendly	Galatasaray (Turkey)	3–0	(England) Liverpool	Istanbul, Turkey
20:00	Baroš 7', 39'; Elmander 84'	Report		Stadium: Türk Telekom Arena; Attendance: 35,500; Referee: (Turkey) Hüseyin Göçek

13 August 2011 Friendly	Galatasaray (Turkey)	2–0	(Turkey) İstanbulspor	Istanbul, Turkey
18:00	Baroš; Stancu	Report		Stadium: Florya Metin Oktay Sports Complex and Training Center

17 August 2011 Friendly	Olympiacos (Greece)	1–0	(Turkey) Galatasaray	Athens, Greece
20:00	Mirallas 1'	Report		Stadium: Karaiskakis Stadium; Referee: Periklis Giolias

24 August 2011 Trofeo Bernabéu	Real Madrid (Spain)	2–1	(Turkey) Galatasaray	Madrid, Spain
22:30	Ramos 33'; Benzema 50'	Report	İnan 10'	Stadium: Santiago Bernabéu Stadium; Attendance: 67,000; Referee: (Spain) Ignacio Iglesias Villanueva

28 August 2011 Friendly	Galatasaray (Turkey)	6–1	(Turkey) Pendikspor	Istanbul, Turkey
17:00	Melo; Dilaver; Manici (o.g); Özhan	Report	Kıbıç	Stadium: Florya Metin Oktay Sports Complex and Training Center

3 September 2011 Friendly	Galatasaray (Turkey)	3–0	(Turkey) Eyüpspor	Istanbul, Turkey
11:00	Eboué (pen.); Ünsal; Ujfaluši	Report		Stadium: Florya Metin Oktay Sports Complex and Training Center

=== Other friendlies ===
8 October 2011 Friendly	Galatasaray (Turkey)	3–3	(Turkey) Kasımpaşa	Istanbul, Turkey
18:00	Yılmaz 51'; Riera 52'; S. Yıldırım 54'	Report	Dimitrov; A. Yıldırım	Stadium: Florya Metin Oktay Sports Complex and Training Center

12 November 2011 Friendly	Benfica (Portugal)	2–0	(Turkey) Galatasaray	Geneva, Switzerland
20:30 CET	Vítor 47'; Saviola 55'	Report		Stadium: Stade de Genève

== Competitions ==
=== Overview ===
Competition	Started round	Current position / round	Final position / round	First match	Last match
Süper Lig	—	1st		12 September 2011	13 May 2012
Turkish Cup	—	—		10 January 2012	20 March 2012

Updated to match played 20 March 2012
Source: Competitions

=== Süper Lig ===
==== Standings ====
Pos	Team	Pld	W	D	L	GF	GA	GD	Pts	Qualification or relegation
1	Galatasaray	34	23	8	3	69	24	+45	77	Qualification to Süper Final, Championship group
2	Fenerbahçe	34	20	8	6	61	34	+27	68	Qualification to Süper Final, Championship group
3	Trabzonspor	34	15	11	8	60	39	+21	56	Qualification to Süper Final, Championship group
4	Beşiktaş	34	15	10	9	50	39	+11	55	Qualification to Süper Final, Championship group
5	Eskişehirspor	34	14	8	12	42	41	+1	50 (Note: Eskişehirspor were ahead of İstanbul B.B. and Sivasspor on head-to-head points: Eskişehirspor: 8 pts, İstanbul B.B.: 5 pts, Sivasspor: 2 pts.)	Qualification to Süper Final, Europa League group

Source: TFF's official Süper Lig website
Rules for classification: 1) points; 2) goal difference; 3) number of goals scored.

==== Results summary ====
Overall								Home						Away					
Pld	W	D	L	GF	GA	GD	Pts	W	D	L	GF	GA	GD	W	D	L	GF	GA	GD
34	23	8	3	69	24	+45	77	13	3	1	38	14	+24	10	5	2	31	10	+21

Source: Competitive Matches

==== Results by round ====
Round	1	2	3	4	5	6	7	8	9	10	11	12	13	14	15	16	17	18	19	20	21	22	23	24	25	26	27	28	29	30	31	32	33	34
Ground	A	H	A	H	A	H	A	H	A	H	A	H	A	H	A	A	H	H	A	H	A	H	A	H	A	H	A	H	A	H	A	H	H	A
Result	L	W	D	W	W	W	D	L	W	D	D	W	W	W	W	W	W	W	W	W	D	W	L	D	W	W	W	W	W	W	D	D	W	W
Position	17	8	8	6	2	2	2	4	2	3	3	2	2	1	1	1	1	1	1	1	1	1	1	1	1	1	1	1	1	1	1	1	1	1

Source: Competitive Matches
A = Away; H = Home; W = Win; D = Draw; L = Loss

==== Matches ====
Win Draw Loss

11 September 2011 1	İstanbul BB	2–0	Galatasaray	Istanbul
20:00 EET	İnanç 41'; Webó 82'	(Report)		Stadium: Atatürk Olympic Stadium; Attendance: 20,000; Referee: Özgür Yankaya

18 September 2011 2	Galatasaray	3–1	Samsunspor	Istanbul
20:00 EET	Melo 17'; Elmander 73'; İnan 76' (pen.)	(Report)	Sarp 54'	Stadium: Türk Telekom Arena; Attendance: 35,246; Referee: Kuddusi Müftüoğlu

21 September 2011 3	Karabükspor	1–1	Galatasaray	Karabük
18:45 EET	Özgenç 73'	(Report)	Melo 82' (pen.)	Stadium: Yenişehir Stadium; Attendance: 7,593; Referee: Bünyamin Gezer

26 September 2011 4	Galatasaray	2–0	Eskişehirspor	Istanbul
20:00 EET	Zan 24'; Melo 52'	(Report)		Stadium: Türk Telekom Arena; Attendance: 30,960; Referee: Tolga Özkalfa

2 October 2011 5	Ankaragücü	0–3	Galatasaray	Ankara
19:00 EET		(Report)	Rajnoch 13' (o.g.); Kazim-Richards 20'; Baroš 85' (pen.)	Stadium: Ankara 19 Mayıs Stadium; Attendance: 19,209; Referee: Fırat Aydınus

16 October 2011 6	Galatasaray	2–1	Bursaspor	Istanbul
19:00 EET	Elmander 21'; Baroš 87'	(Report)	Aziz 80'	Stadium: Türk Telekom Arena; Attendance: 35,060; Referee: Hüseyin Göçek

21 October 2011 7	Antalyaspor	0–0	Galatasaray	Antalya
20:00 EET		(Report)		Stadium: Mardan Sports Complex; Attendance: 10,000; Referee: Yunus Yıldırım

26 October 2011 8	Galatasaray	2–4	Gaziantepspor	Istanbul
20:30 EET	İnan 7'; Elmander 61'	(Report)	Demir 33'; Popov 37'; Gülle 68'; Tosun 88'	Stadium: Türk Telekom Arena; Attendance: 25,905; Referee: Abdullah Yılmaz

30 October 2011 9	Kayserispor	0–2	Galatasaray	Kayseri
16:00 EET		(Report)	Elmander 39'; İnan 72'	Stadium: Kadir Has Stadium; Attendance: 32,864; Referee: Cüneyt Çakır

5 November 2011 10	Galatasaray	0–0	Mersin İdman Yurdu	Istanbul
19:00 EET		(Report)		Stadium: Türk Telekom Arena; Attendance: 33,840; Referee: Fırat Aydınus

20 November 2011 11	Beşiktaş	0–0	Galatasaray	Istanbul
19:00 EET		(Report)		Stadium: BJK İnönü Stadium; Attendance: 32,086; Referee: Cüneyt Çakır

26 November 2011 12	Galatasaray	2–1	Sivasspor	Istanbul
19:00 EET	Baytar 45'; Baroš 59'	(Report)	Kılıç 71'	Stadium: Türk Telekom Arena; Attendance: 28,600; Referee: Bülent Yıldırım

3 December 2011 13	Gençlerbirliği	0–1	Galatasaray	Ankara
16:00 EET		(Report)	Eboué 80'	Stadium: Ankara 19 Mayıs Stadium; Attendance: 12,300; Referee: Tolga Özkalfa

7 December 2011 14	Galatasaray	3–1	Fenerbahçe	Istanbul
20:00 EET	Eboué 33'; Elmander 41'; Melo 66'	(Report)	Alex 90'	Stadium: Türk Telekom Arena; Attendance: 50,152; Referee: Fırat Aydınus

11 December 2011 15	Trabzonspor	0–3	Galatasaray	Trabzon
19:00 EET		(Report)	Elmander 5'; İnan 42'; Gülselam 90'	Stadium: Hüseyin Avni Aker Stadium; Attendance: 20,000; Referee: Kuddusi Müftüoğlu

16 December 2011 16	Orduspor	0–2	Galatasaray	Ordu
20:00 EET		(Report)	Baroš 22'; Kazim-Richards 67'	Stadium: 19 Eylül Stadı; Attendance: 11,000; Referee: Halis Özkahya

21 December 2011 17	Galatasaray	1–0	Manisaspor	Istanbul
20:30 EET	İnan 63'	(Report)		Stadium: Türk Telekom Arena; Attendance: 32,666; Referee: Özgür Yankaya

3 January 2012 18	Galatasaray	4–1	İstanbul BB	Istanbul
20:30 EET	Çolak 7', 50'; Baroš 71'; İnan 90'	(Report)	Višća 14'	Stadium: Türk Telekom Arena; Attendance: 30,093; Referee: Halis Özkahya

7 January 2012 19	Samsunspor	2–4	Galatasaray	Samsun
19:00 EET	Ehiosun 22', 32'	(Report)	Kaya 51'; İnan 69'; Baroš 78'; Yıldırım 84'	Stadium: Samsun 19 Mayıs Stadium; Attendance: 12,720; Referee: Özgür Yankaya

14 January 2012 20	Galatasaray	5–1	Karabükspor	Istanbul
19:00 EET	Baroš 2'; Elmander 42', 68'; Melo 48' (pen.); Baytar 87'	(Report)	Sarp 65'	Stadium: Türk Telekom Arena; Attendance: 23,980; Referee: Mustafa Kamil Abitoğlu

22 January 2012 21	Eskişehirspor	0–0	Galatasaray	Eskişehir
19:00 EET		(Report)		Stadium: Eskişehir Atatürk Stadium; Attendance: 12,500; Referee: Cüneyt Çakır

25 January 2012 22	Galatasaray	4–0	Ankaragücü	Istanbul
20:30 EET	Zan 4'; Çolak 9'; Riera 54'; Gökoğlan 76'	(Report)		Stadium: Türk Telekom Arena; Attendance: 28,022; Referee: Barış Şimşek

28 January 2012 23	Bursaspor	1–0	Galatasaray	Bursa
19:00 EET	Batalla 49'	(Report)		Stadium: Bursa Atatürk Stadium; Attendance: 19,000; Referee: Fırat Aydınus

1 February 2012 24	Galatasaray	1–1	Antalyaspor	Istanbul
20:30 EET	Melo 34' (pen.)	(Report)	Başsan 21'	Stadium: Türk Telekom Arena; Attendance: 12,877; Referee: İlker Meral

4 February 2012 25	Gaziantepspor	1–2	Galatasaray	Gaziantep
19:00 EET	Popov 50'	(Report)	Ateş 53'; Elmander 66'	Stadium: Gaziantep Kamil Ocak Stadium; Attendance: 14,000; Referee: Bülent Yıldırım

11 February 2012 26	Galatasaray	1–0	Kayserispor	Istanbul
19:00 EET	Melo 32'	(Report)		Stadium: Türk Telekom Arena; Attendance: 28,539; Referee: Özgür Yankaya

17 February 2012 27	Mersin İdman Yurdu	1–3	Galatasaray	Mersin
20:00 EET	Güven 76'	(Report)	Ateş 27', 90'; İnan 81' (pen.)	Stadium: Tevfik Sırrı Gür Stadium; Attendance: 10,500; Referee: Tolga Özkalfa

26 February 2012 28	Galatasaray	3–2	Beşiktaş	Istanbul
19:00 EET	Elmander 15', 90+2'; Melo 52'	(Report)	Toraman 48'; Kaya 73' (o.g.)	Stadium: Türk Telekom Arena; Attendance: 49,817; Referee: Fırat Aydınus

5 March 2012 29	Sivasspor	0–4	Galatasaray	Sivas
20:00 EET		(Report)	Ateş 14', 90+3'; Ujfaluši 64'; Yılmaz 81'	Stadium: Sivas 4 Eylül Stadium; Attendance: 11,286; Referee: Halis Özkahya

10 March 2012 30	Galatasaray	2–0	Gençlerbirliği	Istanbul
19:00 EET	Melo 47'; İnan 57'	(Report)		Stadium: Türk Telekom Arena; Attendance: 37,039; Referee: Hüseyin Göçek

17 March 2012 31	Fenerbahçe	2–2	Galatasaray	Istanbul
20:00 EET	Sow 10'; Alex 15'	(Report)	Elmander 35'; Balta 82'	Stadium: Şükrü Saracoğlu Stadium; Attendance: 50,500; Referee: Bülent Yıldırım

25 March 2012 32	Galatasaray	1–1	Trabzonspor	Istanbul
19:00 EET	Melo 81' (pen.)	(Report)	Yılmaz 24'	Stadium: Türk Telekom Arena; Attendance: 39,980; Referee: Cüneyt Çakır

31 March 2012 33	Galatasaray	2–0	Orduspor	Istanbul
19:00 EET	Ateş 7'; Sarıoğlu 65'	(Report)		Stadium: Türk Telekom Arena; Attendance: 37,517; Referee: Tolga Özkalfa

8 April 2012 34	Manisaspor	0–4	Galatasaray	Manisa
19:00 EET		(Report)	İnan 47' (pen.), 76'; Muslera 82' (pen.); Baroš 85'	Stadium: Manisa 19 Mayıs Stadium; Attendance: 15,500; Referee: Suat Arslanboğa

==== Championship play-offs ====
===== Playoff table =====
Pos	Team	Pld	W	D	L	GF	GA	GD	Pts	Qualification
1	Galatasaray (C)	6	2	3	1	9	6	+3	48	Qualification to Champions League group stage
2	Fenerbahçe	6	4	1	1	9	4	+5	47	Qualification to Champions League third qualifying round
3	Trabzonspor	6	1	2	3	5	10	−5	33	Qualification to Europa League play-off round (Note: Trabzonspor entered the play-off round as Fenerbahçe, the winners of the 2011–12 Turkish Cup, already qualified for the Champions League. Moreover, as Beşiktaş is banned 1 year from European football, Europa League spots shifted down, so Bursaspor start from the third qualifying round, as well as Eskişehirspor start from the second qualifying round.)
4	Beşiktaş	6	1	2	3	5	8	−3	33	Banned from 2012–13 European competitions (Note: See 2012–13 UEFA Europa League qualification play-off match. Moreover, as Beşiktaş is banned 1 year from European football, Europa League spots shifted down.)

Source: SporToto Süper Lig official website
Rules for classification: 1) points; 2) goal difference; 3) number of goals scored.
(C) Champions

===== Results summary =====
Overall								Home						Away					
Pld	W	D	L	GF	GA	GD	Pts	W	D	L	GF	GA	GD	W	D	L	GF	GA	GD
6	2	3	1	9	6	+3	9	0	2	1	3	4	−1	2	1	0	6	2	+4

Source: Competitive Matches

===== Results by round =====
Round	1	2	3	4	5	6
Ground	A	H	A	H	H	A
Result	W	L	W	D	D	D
Position	1	1	1	1	1	1

Source: Competitive Matches
A = Away; H = Home; W = Win; D = Draw; L = Loss

===== Matches =====
14 April 2012 1	Beşiktaş	0–2	Galatasaray	Istanbul
20:00 EET			Melo 26'; Yılmaz 79'	Stadium: İnönü Stadium; Attendance: 19,442; Referee: Hüseyin Göçek

22 April 2012 2	Galatasaray	1–2	Fenerbahçe	Istanbul
19:00 EET	İnan 68'		Ziegler 17'; Stoch 79'	Stadium: Türk Telekom Arena; Attendance: 51,567; Referee: Fırat Aydınus

28 April 2012 3	Trabzonspor	2–4	Galatasaray	Trabzon
19:00 EET	Colman 60', 85' (pen.)		İnan 20'; Ateş 22', 40'; Eboué 61'	Stadium: Hüseyin Avni Aker Stadium; Referee: Bülent Yıldırım

2 May 2012 4	Galatasaray	0–0	Trabzonspor	Istanbul
20:00 EET				Stadium: Türk Telekom Arena; Attendance: 31,382; Referee: Tolga Özkalfa

6 May 2012 5	Galatasaray	2–2	Beşiktaş	Istanbul
19:00 EET	Melo 9'; Almeida 45' (o.g.)		Hološko 86'; Ujfaluši 88' (o.g.)	Stadium: Türk Telekom Arena; Attendance: 50,463; Referee: Bülent Yıldırım

12 May 2012 6	Fenerbahçe	0–0	Galatasaray	Istanbul
19:00 EET				Stadium: Şükrü Saracoğlu Stadium; Attendance: 50,250; Referee: Cüneyt Çakır

=== Turkish Cup ===
10 January 2012 Third round	Galatasaray	4–1	Adana Demirspor	Istanbul
20:30 EET	Akman 16'; Baytar 37'; Yıldırım 41', 66'	Report	Evirgen 74'	Stadium: Türk Telekom Arena; Attendance: 15,425; Referee: Mustafa İlker Coşkun

20 March 2012 Fourth round	Galatasaray	0–1	Sivasspor	Istanbul
20:30 EET		Report	Kılıç 49'	Stadium: Türk Telekom Arena; Attendance: 27,896; Referee: Mustafa Kamil Abitoğlu

== Statistics ==
=== Squad statistics ===
|

				Total				Süper Lig		Türkiye Kupası		
N	Pos.	Name	Nat.	GS	App	Gls	Min	App	Gls	App	Gls	Notes
1	GK	Aykut Erçetin	(Turkey)	1	1		90	1				
25	GK	Fernando Muslera	(Uruguay)	39	39	1	3433	39	1			
86	GK	Ufuk Ceylan	(Turkey)	2	3		255	1		2		
3	DF	Çağlar Birinci	(Turkey)	3	3		243	2		1		
5	DF	Gökhan Zan	(Turkey)	12	13	2	940	12	2	1		
17	DF	Tomáš Ujfaluši	(Czech Republic)	39	40	1	3520	39	1	1		
20	DF	Serkan Kurtuluş	(Turkey)									
22	DF	Hakan Balta	(Turkey)	38	38	1	3412	37	1	1		
26	DF	Semih Kaya	(Turkey)	31	31	1	2790	30	1	1		
27	DF	Emmanuel Eboué	(Ivory Coast)	29	32	3	2705	31	3	1		
76	DF	Servet Çetin	(Turkey)	5	10		480	9		1		
6	MF	Ceyhun Gülselam	(Turkey)	3	12	1	306	11	1	1		
7	MF	Aydın Yılmaz	(Turkey)	3	17	2	558	15	2	2		
8	MF	Selçuk İnan	(Turkey)	40	40	13	3574	39	13	1		
10	MF	Felipe Melo	(Brazil)	35	36	12	3268	36	12			
11	MF	Albert Riera	(Spain)	20	32	1	1849	30	1	2		
18	MF	Ayhan Akman	(Turkey)	3	9	1	278	8		1	1	
35	MF	Yekta Kurtuluş	(Turkey)	1	3		116	3				
50	MF	Engin Baytar	(Turkey)	28	36	3	2354	34	2	2	1	
52	MF	Emre Çolak	(Turkey)	23	29	3	1844	28	3	1		
55	MF	Sabri Sarıoğlu	(Turkey)	16	29	1	1534	27	1	2		
21	MF	Yiğit Gökoğlan	(Turkey)		8	1	180	8	1			
9	FW	Johan Elmander	(Sweden)	35	36	12	2918	36	12			
15	FW	Milan Baroš	(Czech Republic)	16	29	8	1480	28	8	1		
19	FW	Mehmet Batdal	(Turkey)		1		16	1				
80	FW	Colin Kazim-Richards	(Turkey)	17	18	2	1342	18	2			
90	FW	Sercan Yıldırım	(Turkey)	5	21	3	753	19	1	2	2	
77	FW	Necati Ateş	(Turkey)	16	16	8	1269	15	8	1		

Last updated: 12 May 2012
Source: Onbirim.com
Ordered by position
0 shown as blank

=== Goals ===
Includes all competitive matches.

Last updated on 12 May 2012

Position	Nation	Number	Name.	Süper Lig	Turkish Cup	Total
1	(Turkey)	8	Selçuk İnan	13	0	13
2	(Sweden)	9	Johan Elmander	12	0	12
2	(Brazil)	12	Felipe Melo	12	0	12
3	(Czech Republic)	14	Milan Baroš	8	0	8
3	(Turkey)	77	Necati Ateş	8	0	8
4	(Turkey)	52	Emre Çolak	3	0	3
4	(Turkey)	50	Engin Baytar	2	1	3
4	(Turkey)	90	Sercan Yıldırım	1	2	3
4	(Ivory Coast)	27	Emmanuel Eboué	3	0	3
5	(Turkey)	7	Aydın Yılmaz	2	0	2
5	(Turkey)	80	Colin Kazim-Richards	2	0	2
5	(Turkey)	5	Gökhan Zan	2	0	2
5			Own Goals	2	0	2
6	(Turkey)	21	Yiğit Gökoğlan	1	0	1
6	(Spain)	11	Albert Riera	1	0	1
6	(Turkey)	6	Ceyhun Gülselam	1	0	1
6	(Turkey)	26	Semih Kaya	1	0	1
6	(Czech Republic)	17	Tomáš Ujfaluši	1	0	1
6	(Turkey)	18	Ayhan Akman	0	1	1
6	(Uruguay)	25	Fernando Muslera	1	0	1
6	(Turkey)	22	Hakan Balta	1	0	1
6	(Turkey)	55	Sabri Sarıoğlu	1	0	1
			TOTALS	78	4	82

=== Clean sheets ===
Rank	Name	Süper Lig	Süper Final Round	Türkiye Kupası	Total
1	(Uruguay) Fernando Muslera	16	3	0	19
2	(Turkey) Aykut Erçetin	1	0	0	1
3	(Turkey) Ufuk Ceylan	0	0	0	0
Total		17	3	0	20

Last updated: 22 November 2018.

=== Disciplinary record ===
N	Pos.	Nat.	Name	Yellow card	Second yellow card	Red card	Notes
1	GK	(Turkey)	Aykut Erçetin				
25	GK	(Uruguay)	Fernando Muslera	4		1	
86	GK	(Turkey)	Ufuk Ceylan				
3	DF	(Turkey)	Çağlar Birinci				
5	DF	(Turkey)	Gökhan Zan	1			
17	DF	(Czech Republic)	Tomáš Ujfaluši	11	1		
20	DF	(Turkey)	Serkan Kurtuluş				
22	DF	(Turkey)	Hakan Balta	2			
26	DF	(Turkey)	Semih Kaya	8			
27	DF	(Ivory Coast)	Emmanuel Eboué	4			
76	DF	(Turkey)	Servet Çetin			1	
6	MF	(Turkey)	Ceyhun Gülselam				
7	MF	(Turkey)	Aydın Yılmaz	2			
8	MF	(Turkey)	Selçuk İnan	6			
10	MF	(Brazil)	Felipe Melo	13			
11	MF	(Spain)	Albert Riera	5			
18	MF	(Turkey)	Ayhan Akman	1			
35	MF	(Turkey)	Yekta Kurtuluş				
50	MF	(Turkey)	Engin Baytar	6		1	
52	MF	(Turkey)	Emre Çolak	7	1		
55	MF	(Turkey)	Sabri Sarıoğlu	1	1		
21	MF	(Turkey)	Yiğit Gökoğlan				
9	FW	(Sweden)	Johan Elmander	4		1	
15	FW	(Czech Republic)	Milan Baroš	2		1	
19	FW	(Turkey)	Mehmet Batdal				
90	FW	(Turkey)	Sercan Yıldırım	1			
77	FW	(Turkey)	Necati Ateş				

Last updated: 12 May 2012
Source: Competitive matches
Only competitive matches
(yellow card) = Number of bookings; (second yellow card) = Number of sending offs after a second yellow card; (red card) = Number of sending offs by a direct red card.

=== Overall ===
	Total	Home	Away
Games played	42	22	20
Games won	26	14	12
Games drawn	11	5	6
Games lost	5	3	2
Biggest win	5–1 vs Karabükspor; 4–0 vs Ankaragücü; 4–0 vs Sivasspor; 4–0 vs Manisaspor	5–1 vs Karabükspor; 4–0 vs Ankaragücü	4–0 vs Sivasspor; 4–0 vs Manisaspor
Biggest loss	2–4 vs Gaziantepspor; 0–2 vs İstanbul BB	2–4 vs Gaziantepspor	0–2 vs İstanbul BB
Biggest win (League)	5–1 vs Karabükspor; 4–0 vs Ankaragücü; 4–0 vs Sivasspor; 4–0 vs Manisaspor	5–1 vs Karabükspor; 4–0 vs Ankaragücü	4–0 vs Sivasspor; 4–0 vs Manisaspor
Biggest win (Cup)	4–1 vs Adana Demirspor	4–1 vs Adana Demirspor	
Biggest loss (League)	2–4 vs Gaziantepspor; 0–2 vs İstanbul BB	2–4 vs Gaziantepspor	0–2 vs İstanbul BB
Biggest loss (Cup)	0–1 vs Sivasspor	0–1 vs Sivasspor	
Clean sheets	20	8	12
Goals scored	82	45	37
Goals conceded	32	20	12
Goal difference	+50	+25	+25
Average GF per game	1.95	2.05	1.85
Average GA per game	0.76	0.91	0.6
Yellow cards	78	–	
Red cards	8	–	
Most appearances	(Turkey) Selçuk İnan (40)	–	
Most minutes played	(Turkey) Selçuk İnan (3574)	–	
Most goals	(Turkey) Selçuk İnan (13)	–	
Most assists	(Turkey) Selçuk İnan (16)	–	
Points	78/126	42/66	36/60
Winning rate	61.9%	63.64%	60%

=== Attendance ===
Competition	Av. Att.	Total Att.
Süper Lig	34,685	693,705
Türkiye Kupası	21,661	43,321
Total	33,501	737,026

- Sold season tickets: 27,900

== See also ==
- 2011–12 Süper Lig
- 2011–12 Turkish Cup
