= 2016–17 İstanbul Başakşehir F.K. season =

Başakşehir
2016–17 season
- President: Göksel Gümüşdağ
- Manager: Abdullah Avcı
- Stadium: Başakşehir Fatih Terim Stadium
- Süper Lig: 2nd
- Turkish Cup: Runners-up
- UEFA Europa League: Play-off round
- Top goalscorer: League: Edin Višća (8); All: Edin Višća (10)

The 2016–17 season was Başakşehir's eighth consecutive season in the Süper Lig and their 27th year in existence. This season, Başakşehir participated in the Süper Lig, Turkish Cup and UEFA Europa League. The season covers the period from 28 July 2016 to 4 June 2017.

== Transfers ==
=== In ===
Date from	Position	Nationality	Name	From	Fee	Ref.
18 May 2016	MF	(Turkey)	Cengiz Ünder	(Turkey) Altınordu	€700,000	
26 May 2016	DF	(Turkey)	Eren Albayrak	(Turkey) Çaykur Rizespor	Undisclosed	
1 June 2016	MF	(Senegal)	Cheikhou Dieng	(Austria) St. Pölten	€500,000	
1 June 2016	MF	(Ghana)	Joseph Attamah	(Turkey) Adana Demirspor	Undisclosed	
12 June 2016	MF	(Sweden)	Samuel Holmén	(Turkey) Fenerbahçe	Undisclosed	
20 August 2016	FW	(Turkey)	Mustafa Pektemek	(Turkey) Beşiktaş	Loan	
1 January 2016	MF	(Turkey)	İrfan Kahveci	(Turkey) Gençlerbirliği	₺6M	
4 January 2017	DF	(Turkey)	Egemen Korkmaz	(Switzerland) FC Wil	Undisclosed	
16 January 2017	DF	(Brazil)	Júnior Caiçara	(Germany) FC Schalke 04	€3M	
31 January 2017	FW	(Togo)	Emmanuel Adebayor	(England) Crystal Palace	Undisclosed	

=== Out ===
Date from	Position	Nationality	Name	From	Fee	Ref.
29 June 2016	FW	(France)	Jérémy Perbet	(Belgium) Gent	€1M	
26 July 2016	MF	(Turkey)	Cenk Şahin	(Germany) FC St. Pauli	Loan	
3 August 2016	FW	(Turkey)	Semih Şentürk	(Turkey) Eskişehirspor	Free	
9 January 2017	MF	(Senegal)	Cheikhou Dieng	(Austria) St. Pölten	Loan	
14 January 2017	MF	(Slovenia)	Rajko Rotman	(Turkey) Kayserispor	Loan	
17 January 2017	MF	(Turkey)	Cenk Ahmet Alkılıç	(Turkey) Alanyaspor	Loan	
31 January 2017	FW	(Albania)	Sokol Cikalleshi	(Turkey) Akhisarspor	Loan	

== First team squad ==
Squad no.	Name	Nationality	Position	Date of birth (age)
Goalkeepers
1	Volkan Babacan	(Turkey)	GK	11 August 1988 (age 38)
55	Faruk Çakır	(Turkey)	GK	8 February 1995 (age 31)
86	Ufuk Ceylan	(Turkey)	GK	23 June 1986 (age 40)
Defenders
2	Yalçın Ayhan	(Turkey)	DF	1 May 1982 (age 44)
3	Ferhat Öztorun	(Turkey)	DF	8 May 1987 (age 39)
6	Alexandru Epureanu	(Moldova)	DF	27 September 1986 (age 39)
11	Eren Albayrak	(Turkey)	DF	23 April 1991 (age 35)
14	Bekir İrtegün	(Turkey)	DF	20 April 1984 (age 42)
15	Joseph Attamah	(Ghana)	DF	22 May 1994 (age 32)
33	Uğur Uçar	(Turkey)	DF	5 April 1987 (age 39)
39	Alparslan Erdem	(Turkey)	DF	11 December 1988 (age 37)
44	Egemen Korkmaz	(Turkey)	DF	3 November 1982 (age 43)
80	Júnior Caiçara	(Brazil)	DF	27 April 1989 (age 37)
Midfielders
5	Emre Belözoğlu	(Turkey)	MF	7 September 1980 (age 46)
7	Edin Višća	(Bosnia and Herzegovina)	MF	17 April 1990 (age 36)
8	Mossoró	(Brazil)	MF	4 July 1983 (age 43)
10	Doka	(Brazil)	MF	11 April 1984 (age 42)
17	Cengiz Ünder	(Turkey)	MF	14 July 1997 (age 29)
20	Hakan Özmert	(Turkey)	MF	3 June 1985 (age 41)
21	Mahmut Tekdemir	(Turkey)	MF	20 January 1988 (age 38)
23	Samuel Holmén	(Sweden)	MF	28 June 1984 (age 42)
77	İrfan Kahveci	(Turkey)	MF	15 July 1995 (age 31)
Forwards
9	Mehmet Batdal	(Turkey)	FW	24 April 1986 (age 40)
18	Stefano Napoleoni	(Italy)	FW	26 June 1986 (age 40)
19	Mustafa Pektemek	(Turkey)	FW	11 August 1988 (age 38)
26	Emmanuel Adebayor	(Togo)	FW	26 April 1984 (age 42)

== Competitions ==
=== Overview ===
Competition	First match	Last match	Starting round	Final position	Record							
Competition	First match	Last match	Starting round	Final position	Pld	W	D	L	GF	GA	GD	Win %
Süper Lig	20 August 2016	21 May 2017	Matchday 1		31	19	9	3	60	27	+33	61.29
Turkish Cup	30 November 2016	27 May 2017	Group Stage		11	6	5	0	20	9	+11	54.55
Europa League	13 September 2016	19 April 2017	Third qualifying round	Play-off round	4	0	2	2	3	7	−4	0.00
Total					46	25	16	5	83	43	+40	54.35

Source: Competitions

=== Pre-season, mid-season and friendlies ===
Win Draw Loss Postponed

Date	Opponent	Venue	Result	Scorers	Report
15 July 2016	Viktoria Plzeň	N	0–1		Report
16 July 2016	Jihlava	N	0–2		Report
19 July 2016	Karlsruher SC	N	0–1		Report
22 July 2016	1. FC Heidenheim	N	1–0	Višća	Report
3 September 2016	Ümraniyespor	H	0–0		Report
9 October 2016	Beşiktaş	A	2–1	Pektemek	Report
12 November 2016	Altınordu	H	1–0	Pektemek	Report
8 January 2017	FK Kukësi	N	3–1	Kahveci, Holmén, Mossoró	Report

=== Süper Lig ===
==== League table ====
Pos	Team	Pld	W	D	L	GF	GA	GD	Pts	Qualification or relegation
1	Beşiktaş (C)	34	23	8	3	73	30	+43	77	Qualification for the Champions League group stage
2	Başakşehir	34	21	10	3	63	28	+35	73	Qualification for the Champions League third qualifying round
3	Fenerbahçe	34	18	10	6	60	32	+28	64 (Note: Fenerbahçe ahead of Galatasaray on head-to-head points: Fenerbahçe 6 pts, Galatasaray 0 pts.)	Qualification for the Europa League third qualifying round
4	Galatasaray	34	20	4	10	65	40	+25	64	Qualification for the Europa League second qualifying round
5	Antalyaspor	34	17	7	10	47	40	+7	58	

Source: Süper Lig, Soccerway
Rules for classification: 1) Points; 2) Head-to-head points; 3) Head-to-head goal difference; 4) Head-to-head goals scored; 5) Goal difference; 6) Goals scored; 7) Play-off.
(C) Champions

==== Results summary ====
Overall								Home						Away					
Pld	W	D	L	GF	GA	GD	Pts	W	D	L	GF	GA	GD	W	D	L	GF	GA	GD
33	20	10	3	62	28	+34	70	12	5	0	39	15	+24	8	5	3	23	13	+10

Pld = Matches played; W = Matches won; D = Matches drawn; L = Matches lost; GF = Goals for; GA = Goals against; GD = Goal difference; Pts = Points

==== Results by round ====
Round	1	2	3	4	5	6	7	8	9	10	11	12	13	14	15	16	17	18	19	20	21	22	23	24	25	26	27	28	29	30	31	32	33	34
Ground	H	A	H	A	H	A	H	A	H	A	H	A	H	A	H	A	H	A	H	A	H	A	H	A	H	A	H	A	H	A	H	A	H	A
Result	W	W	W	W	D	W	D	W	W	W	W	D	D	D	W	D	W	L	W	L	D	W	W	W	D	L	W	D	W	W	W	D	W	W
Position	7	2	1	1	1	1	1	1	1	1	1	1	1	1	1	1	1	2	2	2	2	2	2	2	2	2	2	2	2	2	2	2	2	2

A = Away; H = Home; W = Win; D = Draw; L = Loss

==== Matches ====
Win Draw Loss Postponed

Match	Date	Opponent	Venue	Result	Scorers	Report
1	21 August 2016	Fenerbahçe	H	1–0	Mossoró	Report
2	28 August 2016	Bursaspor	A	0–2	Mossoró, Pektemek	Report
3	10 September 2016	Kasımpaşa	H	3–1	Višća, Mossoró, Özmert	Report
4	18 September 2016	Gaziantepspor	A	0–1	van Hintum (o.g.)	Report
5	24 September 2016	Osmanlıspor	H	2–2	Napoleoni (2)	Report
6	2 October 2016	Alanyaspor	A	0–5	Višća, Batdal, Epureanu, Ünder, Pektemek	Report
7	16 October 2016	Konyaspor	H	1–1	Batdal	Report
8	23 October 2016	Karabükspor	A	0–2	Belözoğlu (pen.), Batdal	Report
9	30 October 2016	Akhisar Belediyespor	H	5–1	Ünder, Višća (2), Tekdemir, Mossoró	Report
11	4 November 2016	Galatasaray	A	1–2	Batdal, Ayhan	Report
12	21 November 2016	Rizespor	H	2–1	Belözoğlu, Saâdane (o.g.)	Report
13	26 November 2016	Beşiktaş	A	1–1	Ünder	Report
14	3 December 2016	Antalyaspor	H	2–2	Tekdemir, Mossoró	Report
15	10 December 2016	Gençlerbirliği	A	0–0		Report
16	17 December 2016	Trabzonspor	H	1–0	Višća	Report
17	24 December 2016	Adanaspor	A	1–1	Attamah	Report
18	14 January 2017	Kayserispor	H	5–0	Batdal, Belözoğlu (pen.), Višća, Stevanović (o.g.), Ünder	Report
19	22 January 2017	Fenerbahçe	A	1–0	Mossoró	Report
20	29 January 2017	Bursaspor	H	1–0	Kahveci	Report
21	12 February 2017	Kasımpaşa	A	4–0		Report
22	18 February 2017	Gaziantepspor	H	0–0		Report
23	26 February 2017	Osmanlıspor	A	0–1	Pektemek	Report
24	5 March 2017	Alanyaspor	H	2–1	Višća, Pektemek	Report
25	12 March 2017	Konyaspor	A	0–3	Ayhan, Adebayor, Ünder	Report
26	19 March 2017	Karabükspor	H	3–3	Doka, Višća, Adebayor	Report
27	1 April 2017	Akhisar Belediyespor	A	2–1	Ayhan	Report
28	10 April 2017	Galatasaray	H	4–0	Adebayor (3), Pektemek	Report
12	22 April 2017	Rizespor	A	3–3	Erdem, Pektemek, Belözoğlu (pen.)	Report
29	30 April 2017	Beşiktaş	H	3–1	Ünder (2), Adebayor	Report
30	5 May 2017	Antalyaspor	A	0–1	Napoleoni	Report
31	13 May 2017	Gençlerbirliği	H	2–1	Mossoró, Pektemek	Report
32	21 May 2017	Trabzonspor	A	0–0		Report
33	27 May 2017	Adanaspor	H	2–1	Doka, Napoleoni	Report
34	3 June 2017	Kayserispor	A	0–1	İrtegün	Report

=== Turkish Cup ===
==== Group stage ====
Group F

Pos	Club	Pld	W	D	L	GF	GA	GD	Pts
1	Başakşehir	6	4	2	0	11	2	+9	14
2	Sivasspor	6	3	1	2	8	6	+2	10
3	Göztepe	6	2	0	4	7	13	-6	6
4	Yeni Amasyaspor	3	1	1	4	6	11	-5	4

Pld = Matches played; W = Matches won; D = Matches drawn; L = Matches lost; GF = Goals for; GA = Goals against; GD = Goal difference; Pts = Points

==== Matches ====
Win Draw Loss Postponed

Match	Date	Opponent	Venue	Result	Scorers	Report
1	29 November 2016	Yeni Amasyaspor	A	0–1	Cikalleshi	Report
2	13 December 2016	Sivasspor	H	2–0	Koçak (o.g.), Napoleoni	Report
3	20 December 2016	Göztepe	H	6–2	Cikalleshi (2), Napoleoni (2), Holmén, Dieng	Report
4	28 December 2016	Göztepe	A	0–2	Erdem, Uçar	Report
5	19 January 2017	Yeni Amasyaspor	H	0–0		Report
6	25 January 2017	Sivasspor	A	0–0		Report

==== Knockout phase ====
Win Draw Loss Postponed

Round	Match	Date	Opponent	Venue	Result	Scorers	Report
Round of 16		4 February 2017	Galatasaray	H	2–1	Pektemek (2)	Report
Quarter-finals	First leg	1 March 2017	Akhisar Belediyespor	H	1–1	Napoleoni	Report
Quarter-finals	Second leg	4 April 2017	Akhisar Belediyespor	A	0–2	Adebayor, Batdal	Report
Semi-finals	First leg	26 April 2017	Fenerbahçe	H	2–2	Ünder (2)	Report
Semi-finals	Second leg	17 May 2017	Fenerbahçe	A	2–2 ^{(9 – 10 p)}	Belözoğlu, Holmén	Report
Final		31 May 2017	Konyaspor	N	0–0 ^{(1 – 4 p)}	Belözoğlu	Report

=== UEFA Europa League ===
==== Third qualifying round ====
Win Draw Loss Postponed

Match	Date	Opponent	Venue	Result	Scorers	Report
First leg	28 July 2016	(Croatia) HNK Rijeka	H	0–0		Report
Second leg	4 August 2016	(Croatia) HNK Rijeka	A	2–2	Višća (2)	Report

2–2 on aggregate. Başakşehir won on away goals.

==== Play-off round ====
Win Draw Loss Postponed

Match	Date	Opponent	Venue	Result	Scorers	Report
First leg	18 August 2016	(Ukraine) Shakhtar Donetsk	H	1–2	Belözoğlu (pen.)	Report
Second leg	25 August 2016	(Ukraine) Shakhtar Donetsk	A (Note: Shakhtar Donetsk played their home match at Arena Lviv, Lviv, instead of their regular stadium Donbas Arena, Donetsk, due to the war conditions in Eastern Ukraine.)	2–0		Report

Başakşehir lose 1–4 on aggregate.
