= Rızvan Şahin =

Turkish footballer

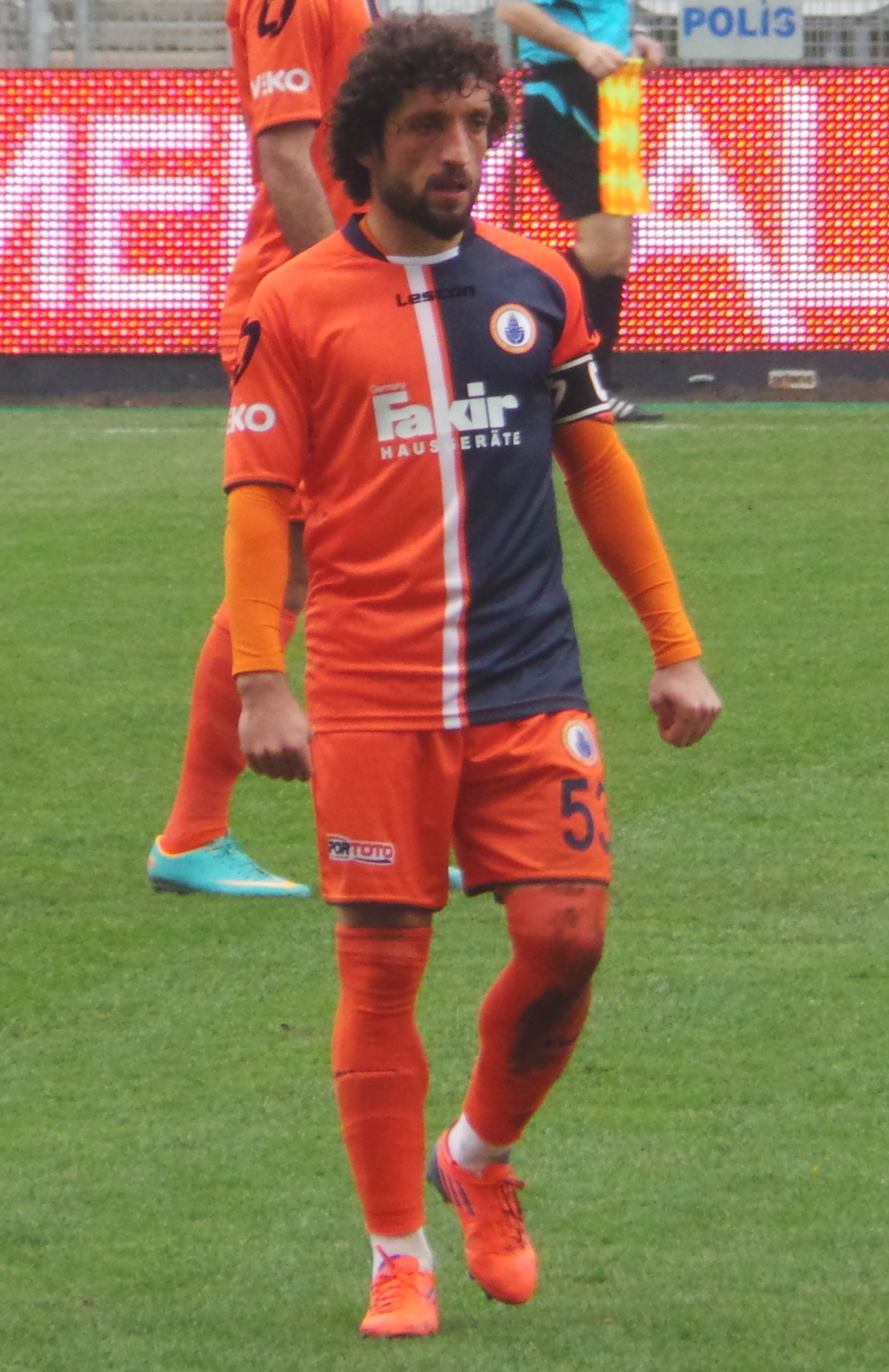

Personal information
- Date of birth: 30 October 1981 (age 45)
- Place of birth: Rize, Turkey
- Height: 1.70 m (5 ft 7 in)
- Position: Right back

Team information
- Current team: Giresunspor
- Number: 24

Youth career
- 1997–1999: Çayelispor
- 1999–2001: Çaykur Rizespor

Senior career*
Years	Team	Apps	(Gls)
2001–2003	Çaykur Rizespor	0	(0)
2001	→ Çaykurspor (loan)	13	(0)
2001–2002	→ Artvin Hopaspor (loan)	18	(0)
2002–2003	→ Pazarspor (loan)	27	(4)
2003–2005	Pazarspor	58	(7)
2005–2015	İstanbul Başakşehir	174	(0)
2015–2017	Giresunspor	38	(0)
2017–2018	Esenler Erokspor	29	(0)
- * Club domestic league appearances and goals

Rızvan Şahin (born 30 October 1981) is a Turkish former footballer who played as a defender.
