= Emirhan Ergün =

Turkish footballer (born 1990)

Personal information
- Full name: Emirhan Ergün
- Date of birth: 18 February 1990 (age 36)
- Place of birth: Istanbul, Turkey
- Height: 1.84 m (6 ft 0 in)
- Position: Goalkeeper

Team information
- Current team: Derincespor
- Number: 25

Youth career
- 2002–2008: Galatasaray

Senior career*
Years	Team	Apps	(Gls)
2008–2012	Galatasaray A2	42	(0)
2012–2014	Bandırmaspor	28	(0)
2014–2016	Sarıyer	0	(0)
2016–	Derincespor	5	(0)

International career
2007	Turkey U17	1	(0)
2007–2008	Turkey U18	10	(0)
2008–2009	Turkey U19	12	(0)
- * Club domestic league appearances and goals as of 26 December 2016

Emirhan Ergün (born 18 February 1990) is a Turkish professional football player. Ergün plays as a goalkeeper for Derincespor.
