= Emre Yüksektepe =

Turkish footballer

Personal information
- Full name: Emre Yüksektepe
- Date of birth: September 29, 1991 (age 35)
- Place of birth: Beyoğlu, Istanbul, Turkey
- Height: 1.76 m (5 ft 9 1/2 in)
- Position: Defensive midfielder

Team information
- Current team: 52 Orduspor

Youth career
- 2004–2007: Altinova
- 2007–2011: Galatasaray

Senior career*
Years	Team	Apps	(Gls)
2011–2014	Galatasaray	0	(0)
2011	→ Konyaspor (loan)	5	(0)
2011–2012	→ Şanlıurfaspor (loan)	15	(0)
2012–2013	→ İstanbulspor (loan)	30	(1)
2013–2014	→ İstanbulspor (loan)	33	(0)
2014–2015	BB Erzurumspor	32	(0)
2015–2016	Çorum FK	23	(1)
2016–2017	Tire 1922 Spor	32	(0)
2017–2018	Çorum FK	28	(1)
2018–2019	Cizrespor	28	(0)
2019–2020	Gölcükspor	26	(1)
2020	Isparta 32 Spor	11	(0)
2021–	52 Orduspor	0	(0)

International career
2009	Turkey U19	1	(0)
- * Club domestic league appearances and goals as of 30 December 2020

Emre Yüksektepe (born 29 September 1991) is a Turkish professional footballer who plays as a defensive midfielder for 52 Orduspor.
