= Barış Özbek =

German footballer

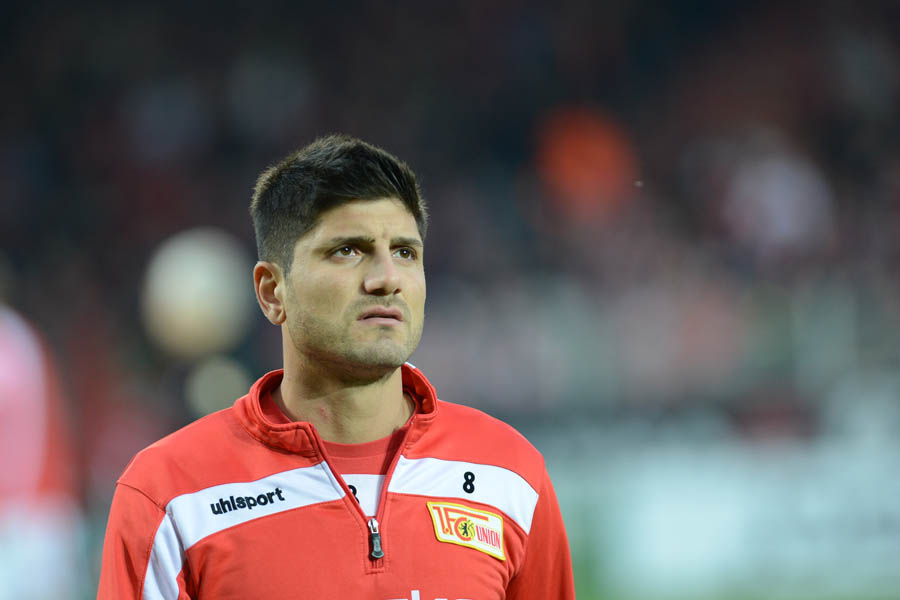
- Özbek with Union Berlin in 2013

Personal information
- Date of birth: 14 September 1986 (age 40)
- Place of birth: Castrop-Rauxel, West Germany
- Height: 1.80 m (5 ft 11 in)
- Position: Midfielder

Youth career
- Blau-Gelb Schwerin
- SG Wattenscheid 09
- DJK TuS Hordel
- 2003–2005: Rot-Weiss Essen

Senior career*
Years	Team	Apps	(Gls)
2005–2007	Rot-Weiss Essen	38	(1)
2007–2011	Galatasaray	91	(7)
2011–2013	Trabzonspor	9	(0)
2013–2015	Union Berlin	40	(2)
2015–2016	Kayserispor	11	(0)
2016–2017	MSV Duisburg	22	(0)
2018–2020	Fatih Karagümrük	29	(1)
Total		240	(11)

International career
2006–2007	Germany U20	3	(0)
2006–2008	Germany U21	16	(3)
- * Club domestic league appearances and goals as of 07:08, 26 August 2020 (UTC)

Barış Özbek (Turkish pronunciation: [baɾɯʃ œzbek], born 14 September 1986) is a German former professional footballer who played as a midfielder.

== Club career ==
Özbek cemented his spot as a solid regular starter at Galatasaray in his first season and won the league title with his club. At the start of the 2009–10 season, he scored a brace during the third qualifying round of the Europa League, against Maccabi Netanya on 6 August 2009. He adopted the nickname Barış for his commitment when it comes to chasing the ball.

In June 2011, he left Galatasaray to join league rivals Trabzonspor.

In January 2015 Özbek joined Kayserispor from Union Berlin.

Özbek moved to MSV Duisburg on 1 February 2016. In November 2017, he agreed to the termination of his contract.

By April 2022, Özbek had retired from professional playing.

== International career ==
Born to Turkish parents in Germany, Özbek has a German passport and played for the Germany under-21 national team.

== Personal life ==
His brother, Ufuk is also a professional footballer.

== Career statistics ==
As of 1 July 2017

Appearances and goals by club, season and competition
Club	Season	League		National cup		League cup		Europe		Total	
Club	Season	Apps	Goals	Apps	Goals	Apps	Goals	Apps	Goals	Apps	Goals
Rot-Weiss Essen	2005–06	13	0	0	0	–		–		13	0
Rot-Weiss Essen	2006–07	25	1	1	1	–		–		26	2
Rot-Weiss Essen	Total	38	1	1	1	0	0	0	0	39	2
Galatasaray	2007–08	30	2	8	1	0	0	8	0	46	3
Galatasaray	2008–09	25	3	3	0	1	0	7	0	36	3
Galatasaray	2009–10	19	1	6	2	0	0	10	2	35	5
Galatasaray	2010–11	17	1	2	0	0	0	3	0	22	1
Galatasaray	Total	91	7	19	3	1	0	28	2	139	12
Trabzonspor	2011–12	7	0	0	0	0	0	0	0	7	0
Trabzonspor	2012–13	2	0	0	0	0	0	0	0	2	0
Trabzonspor	Total	9	0	0	0	0	0	0	0	9	0
Union Berlin	2012–13	13	2	0	0	0	0	0	0	13	2
Union Berlin	2013–14	20	0	3	0	0	0	0	0	23	0
Union Berlin	2014–15	7	0	1	0	0	0	0	0	8	0
Union Berlin	Total	40	2	4	0	0	0	0	0	44	2
Kayserispor	2014–15	0	0	0	0	0	0	0	0	0	0
MSV Duisburg	2015–16	9	0	–		–		–		9	0
MSV Duisburg	2016–17	13	0	1	0	–		–		14	0
MSV Duisburg	Total	22	0	1	0	–		–		23	0
Career total		200	10	25	4	1	0	28	2	254	16

== Honours ==
Galatasaray

- Süper Lig: 2007–08
- Türkiye Süper Kupası: 2008
