= Musa Çağıran =

Turkish footballer

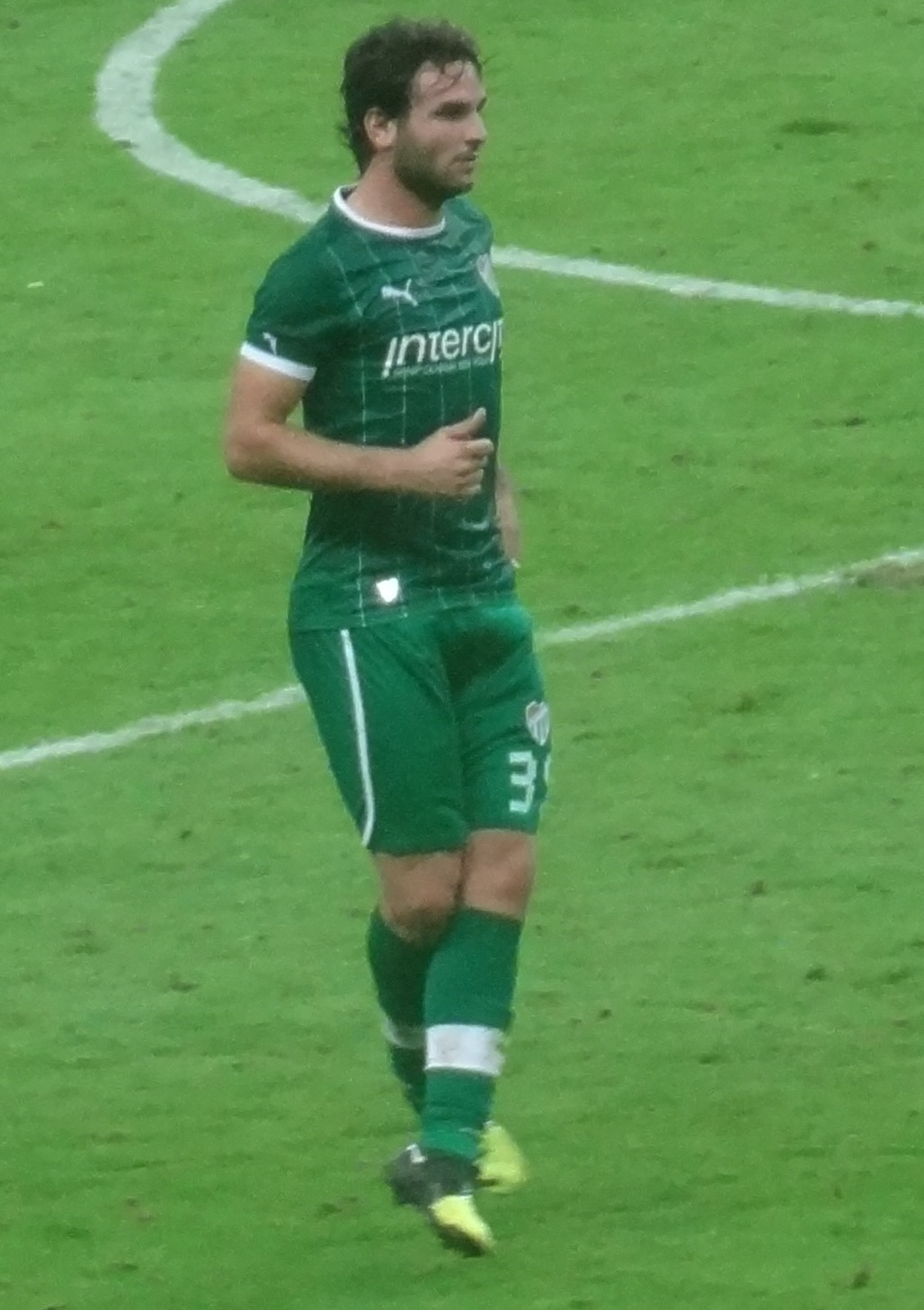

Personal information
- Date of birth: 17 November 1992 (age 33)
- Place of birth: Ilgın, Turkey
- Height: 1.81 m (5 ft 11 in)
- Position: Midfielder

Youth career
- 2003–2004: Altınırmakspor
- 2004–2007: Altay

Senior career*
Years	Team	Apps	(Gls)
2007–2010	Altay	50	(8)
2007	→ Aliağa (loan)	10	(0)
2010–2011	Galatasaray	1	(0)
2011	→ Konyaspor (loan)	14	(1)
2011–2014	Bursaspor	51	(2)
2014–2015	Karabükspor	43	(4)
2015–2019	Osmanlıspor	81	(17)
2018–2019	→ Çaykur Rizespor (loan)	17	(0)
2019–2020	Alanyaspor	17	(0)
2020–2022	Konyaspor	28	(1)
2022–2023	Hatayspor	14	(0)
2023	→ Bucaspor 1928 (loan)	9	(2)
2023–2024	Gençlerbirliği	21	(2)
2024–2026	Bursaspor	52	(4)

International career^{‡}
2008–2009	Turkey U17	5	(1)
2007–2010	Turkey U18	20	(0)
2010–2014	Turkey U21	13	(3)
2015	Turkey B	1	(0)
- * Club domestic league appearances and goals as of 25 April 2026 ‡ National team caps and goals as of 9 August 2015

Musa Çağıran (born 17 November 1992) is a Turkish footballer who plays as a midfielder. He has also made an appearance for Turkey's national football B team.

== Career ==
He signed for Galatasaray on 3 February 2010, signing a three-year contract but was allowed to see out the rest of the season at Altay. However, having turned out only once for Galatasaray, Çagiran signed on for Konyaspor, on loan, and then on to Bursaspor full-time.

He stayed at Bursaspor until 2014 (three years), playing 51 games and scoring twice. The midfielder then went on to join Karabukspor; here he appeared in 43 games and scoring four times, a better record than that of his time with Bursaspor. After Karabukspor, Musa Çagiran signed a deal with Osmanlispor, with whom he played in four Europa League games: against Steaua, Villarreal and Zürich.

On 22 June 2022, Çağıran signed a two-year contract (with an optional third year) with Hatayspor.

=== International career ===
Between 2008 and 2015 Musa Çagiran made appearances for Turkey's U17s, U18s, U21s and B team.

== Career statistics ==
As of 31 May 2010

Club	Season	League		Cup		League Cup		Europe		Total	
Club	Season	Apps	Goals	Apps	Goals	Apps	Goals	Apps	Goals	Apps	Goals
Aliağa Belediyespor	2007–08	10	1	0	0	-		-		10	1
Aliağa Belediyespor	Total	10	1	0	0	0	0	0	0	10	1
Altay	2007–08	1	0	0	0	-		-		1	0
Altay	2008–09	19	0	4	1	-		-		23	1
Altay	2009–10	30	8	2	0	-		-		32	8
Altay	Total	50	8	6	1	0	0	0	0	56	9
Galatasaray	2010–11	1	0	0	0	0	0	0	0	0	0
Galatasaray	Total	1	0	0	0	0	0	0	0	0	0
Career total		61	9	6	1	0	0	0	0	67	10
