= Bülent Yıldırım (referee) =

Turkish football referee (born 1972)

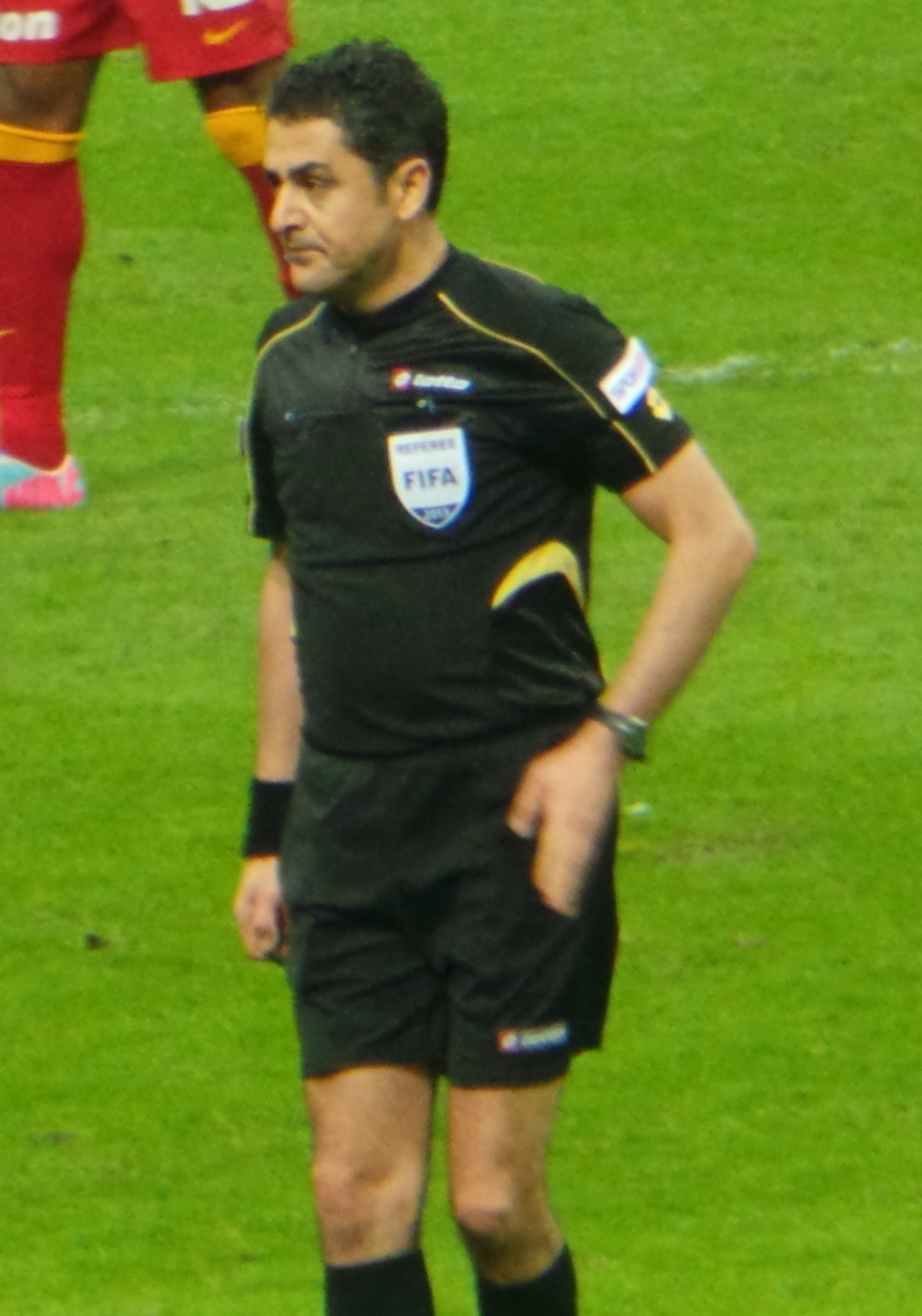
- Bülent Yıldırım
- Born: 1 March 1972 (age 54); Pınarbaşı, Kayseri Province, Turkey

Domestic
| Years | League | Role |
| 1994 | TFF Third League | Referee |
| 1994 | TFF Second League | Referee |
| 2001-03 | TFF First League | Referee |
| 2003-present | Süper Lig | Referee |
| 1994 | Turkish Cup | Referee |

International
| Years | League | Role |
| 2011 | FIFA listed | Referee |

Bülent Yıldırım (born 1 March 1972 in Pınarbaşı, Kayseri Province, Turkey) is a Turkish football referee.

He was educated in Political Science and Public Administration at the Middle East Technical University in Ankara. Currently, he is employed at the Ministry of Economics serving as the head of the Internior Auditing Department.

He started a football referee career in 1994. Tıldırım was promoted to Süper Lig referee in the 2003-04 season's fourth match of Elazığspor-Adanaspor on August 30, 2003. He acted as official in more than 300 competitions sofar.

With effect of January 1, 2011, he was tasked by the UEFA as referee at high-level matches. During the UEFA Euro 2012 qualifying round, he served in the matches Ukraine against Sweden and Italy against Ireland. At the semifinal match of the same event, he was the linesman at the match Spain-Portugal. He refereed at 2012–13 UEFA Europa League. Yıldırım was named to serve as a referee in the Group F match between Portugal and Luxembourg at the 2014 FIFA World Cup qualification round. He oversaw about sixty matches at FIFA and UEFA level in addition to thirty national competitions among them three for Turkish national team matches.
