= Yalçın Ayhan =

Turkish footballer

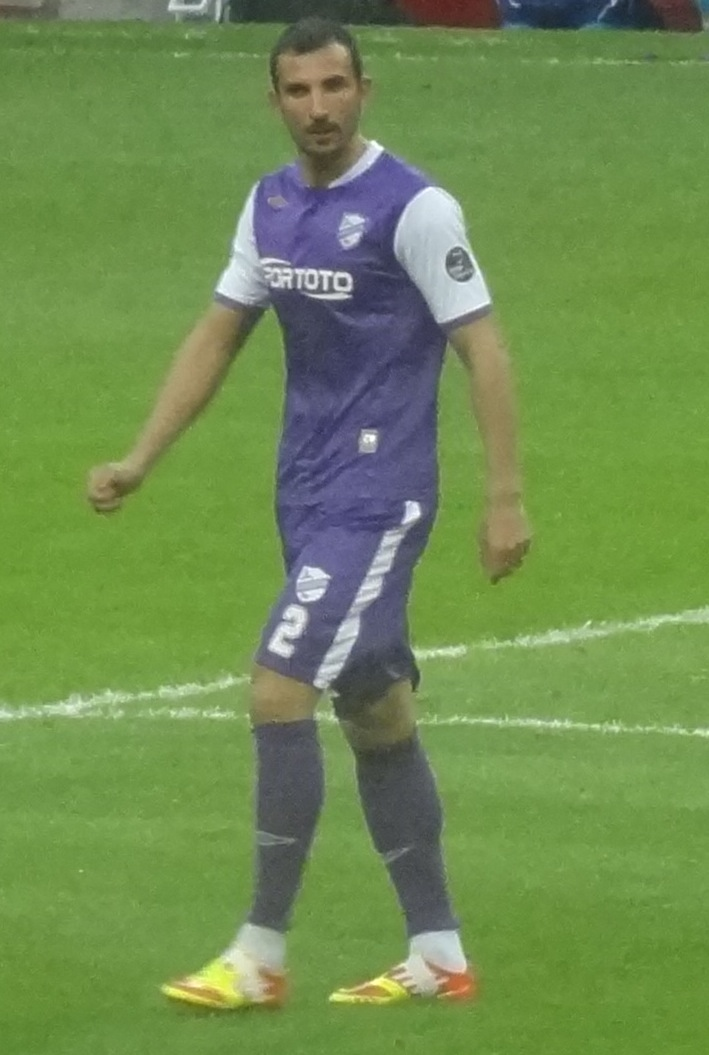

Personal information
- Full name: Yalçın Ayhan
- Date of birth: 1 May 1982 (age 44)
- Place of birth: Istanbul, Turkey
- Height: 1.92 m (6 ft 4 in)
- Position: Centre back

Youth career
- 1998–2003: İstanbulspor

Senior career*
Years	Team	Apps	(Gls)
2003–2005	İstanbulspor	49	(5)
2005–2006	Galatasaray	4	(0)
2006–2007	Kayseri Erciyesspor	7	(0)
2006–2007	Sakaryaspor	0	(0)
2007–2008	Manisaspor	1	(0)
2007–2008	İstanbulspor	4	(0)
2008–2010	Antalyaspor	56	(2)
2010–2011	Gaziantepspor	27	(1)
2011–2012	Orduspor	33	(2)
2012–2014	Kasımpaşa	64	(2)
2014–2017	İstanbul Başakşehir	92	(9)
2017–2018	Yeni Malatyaspor	13	(1)
2018	Osmanlıspor	16	(0)
2018–2019	Ankaragücü	21	(0)
2020	Fatih Karagümrük	13	(0)

International career
2005	Turkey A2	1	(0)
- * Club domestic league appearances and goals as of 30 July 2020

Yalçın Ayhan (born 1 May 1982) is a Turkish former professional footballer who played as a centre back.

== International ==
In November 2016 Ayhan received his first call-up to the senior Turkey squad for the match against Kosovo.

== Honours ==
=== Individual ===
- Süper Lig Team of the Season: 2015–16
