= Anıl Dilaver =

Turkish footballer

Personal information
- Full name: Anıl Dilaver
- Date of birth: 20 November 1990 (age 35)
- Place of birth: Trabzon, Turkey
- Height: 1.83 m (6 ft 0 in)
- Positions: Forward; right wing

Team information
- Current team: Bayburt Grup Özel İdarespor

Youth career
- 2003–2006: Küçükçekmecespor
- 2006–2008: Galatasaray A2

Senior career*
Years	Team	Apps	(Gls)
2008–2010	Galatasaray A2	61	(31)
2010–2014	Galatasaray	2	(1)
2011–2012	→ Samsunspor (loan)	14	(0)
2012–2013	→ Denizlispor (loan)	2	(0)
2013	→ Ofspor (loan)	5	(1)
2014–2016	Bucaspor	15	(3)
2014–2015	→ Van B.B. (loan)	27	(7)
2016–	Bayburt Grup Özel İdarespor		
- * Club domestic league appearances and goals as of 5 January 2016

Anıl Dilaver (born November 20, 1990) is a Turkish footballer. He was born in Trabzon, and plays as a forward for Bayburt Grup Özel İdarespor.
