= Serdar Eylik =

Turkish footballer

Personal information
- Date of birth: 1 February 1990 (age 36)
- Place of birth: Elazığ, Turkey
- Height: 1.76 m (5 ft 9 in)
- Positions: Winger; attacking midfielder

Team information
- Current team: Kuşadasıspor
- Number: 10

Youth career
- 2002–2010: Galatasaray

Senior career*
Years	Team	Apps	(Gls)
2009–2014	Galatasaray	1	(0)
2010	→ Orduspor (loan)	14	(2)
2010–2011	→ Denizlispor (loan)	25	(3)
2011	→ Karşıyaka (loan)	5	(0)
2012	→ Giresunspor (loan)	16	(5)
2012–2013	→ Kayseri Erciyesspor (loan)	30	(6)
2013–2014	→ Osmanlıspor (loan)	23	(2)
2014–2015	Samsunspor	9	(2)
2015	Şanlıurfaspor	12	(3)
2015–2016	Sarıyer	13	(2)
2016	Hatayspor	13	(0)
2016–2017	Tokatspor	30	(3)
2017	Silivrispor	14	(4)
2018	Nazilli Belediyespor	14	(3)
2018–2019	Bayburt Özel İdarespor	33	(10)
2019–2022	Ankara Demirspor	96	(33)
2022–2023	Amed	33	(7)
2023–	Kuşadasıspor	4	(2)

International career
2007	Turkey U17	2	(0)
2007–2008	Turkey U18	20	(3)
2008–2010	Turkey U19	9	(2)
2010	Turkey U20	2	(0)
2010	Turkey U21	4	(0)
- * Club domestic league appearances and goals as of 1 October 2023

Serdar Eylik (born 1 February 1990) is a Turkish professional footballer who plays as a winger for Kuşadasıspor.

== Early life and club career ==
Eylik was born in Elazığ, while his parents were originally from Kars. The family later moved to Istanbul while Eylik was a year old. Eylik joined Galatasaray's youth academy as a ten-year-old in 2000. He was inspired to play football by his uncle, a semi-professional footballer. On 14 October 2008, Eylik put pen to paper on his first professional contract. Eylik scored eight goals in 48 matches playing in the A2 league. He made his professional debut against FC Tobol in the 2009–10 UEFA Europa League. His league debut came against Sivasspor on 1 November 2009. During the winter break, Eylik was loaned out to Orduspor, netting two goals in 14 TFF First League matches during the second half of the season. Eylik was again loaned out, this time to Denizlispor on 14 July 2010.

== International career ==
Eylik was first called up to international play at the under-17 level in 2007. He has also played for Turkey at the U-18, U-19, U-20, and U-21 levels.
