= Serkan Kurtuluş =

Albanian-Turkish footballer

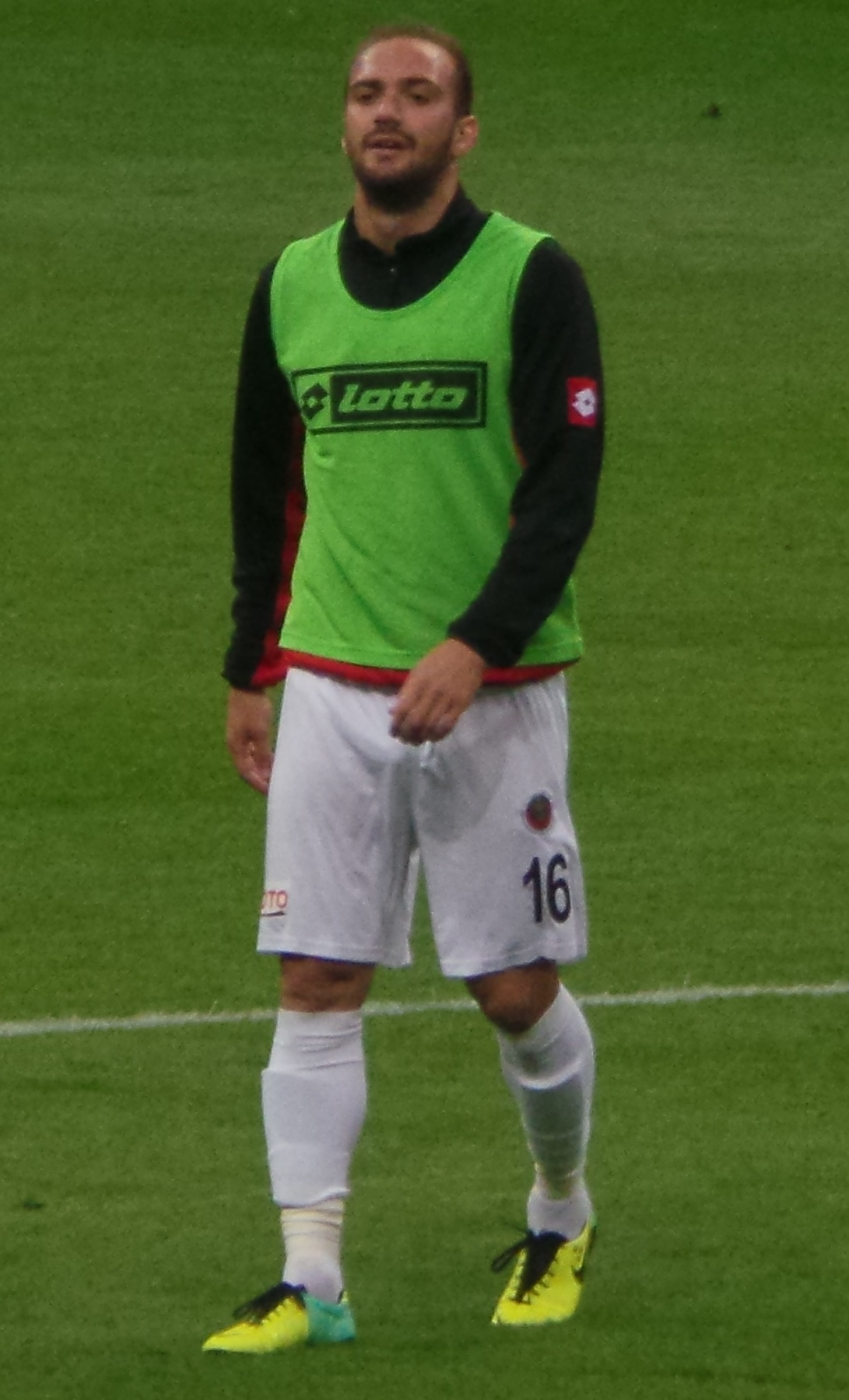

Personal information
- Full name: Fatih Serkan Kurtuluş
- Date of birth: 1 January 1990 (age 36)
- Place of birth: Bursa, Turkey
- Height: 1.81 m (5 ft 11 in)
- Position: Right back

Youth career
- 2000–2006: Bursaspor

Senior career*
Years	Team	Apps	(Gls)
2006–2008	Bursaspor	10	(0)
2008–2012	Galatasaray	14	(0)
2012–2014	Gençlerbirliği	23	(0)
2014–2015	Kayserispor	11	(0)
2015–2016	Karşıyaka	15	(0)
2016	Göztepe	14	(0)
2017	Konya Selçukspor	13	(0)
2017–2019	Elazığspor	26	(0)
2019	BB Erzurumspor	6	(0)
2020	Kırşehir Belediyespor	5	(0)

International career
2005	Turkey U15	5	(0)
2004–2006	Turkey U16	17	(0)
2005–2007	Turkey U17	17	(2)
2007	Turkey U18	4	(0)
2008–2009	Turkey U19	15	(1)
2010	Turkey U20	2	(0)
2008–2011	Turkey U21	6	(0)
2008–2011	Turkey A2	2	(0)
- * Club domestic league appearances and goals as of 13:28, 14 July 2020 (UTC)

Fatih Serkan Kurtuluş (born 1 January 1990) is a Turkish football player.

== Club career ==
He transferred to Galatasaray on 3 September 2008, signing a five-year contract, having previously played for Bursaspor.

Kurtuluş made his first competitive debut for Galatasaray on 18 September 2008 in a match against AC Bellinzona, playing the first half and providing an assist for Harry Kewell's goal. He made his league debut for Galatasaray on 6 March 2009, in a match against his former club Bursaspor.

== Personal life ==
Serkan's brother, Serdar Kurtuluş, is also a retired professional footballer.

== Career statistics ==
As of 4 March 2019

Club	Season	League		Cup		League Cup		Europe		Total	
Club	Season	Apps	Goals	Apps	Goals	Apps	Goals	Apps	Goals	Apps	Goals
Bursaspor	2006–07	2	0	0	0	0	0	-		2	0
Bursaspor	2007–08	8	0	4	0	0	0	-		12	0
Bursaspor	Total	10	0	4	0	0	0	0	0	14	0
Galatasaray	2008–09	8	0	0	0	-		3	0	11	0
Galatasaray	2009–10	0	0	1	0	-		1	0	2	0
Galatasaray	2010–11	14	0	4	0	0	0	1	0	19	0
Galatasaray	2011–12	0	0	0	0	0	0	0	0	0	0
Galatasaray	Total	22	0	5	0	0	0	5	0	32	0
Gençlerbirliği	2012–13	14	0	2	0	-		-		16	0
Gençlerbirliği	2013–14	9	0	1	0	-		-		10	0
Gençlerbirliği	Total	23	0	3	0	0	0	0	0	26	0
Kayserispor	2014–15	11	0	11	1	-		-		22	1
Karşıyaka	2015–16	15	0	3	0	-		-		18	0
Göztepe	2015–16	14	0	0	0	-		-		14	0
Konya Selçukspor	2016–17	13	0	0	0	-		-		13	0
Elazığspor	2017–18	14	0	2	1	-		-		16	1
Elazığspor	2018–19	12	0	1	0	-		-		13	0
Elazığspor	Total	26	0	3	1	-		-		29	1
BB Erzurumspor	2018–19	4	0	0	0	-		-		4	0
Career total		138	0	29	2	0	0	5	0	172	2
