= Aykut Erçetin =

Turkish footballer

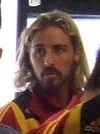

Personal information
- Full name: Aykut Erçetin
- Date of birth: 14 September 1982 (age 44)
- Place of birth: Göppingen, West Germany
- Height: 1.87 m (6 ft 2 in)
- Position: Goalkeeper

Youth career
- 2001–2003: VfB Stuttgart

Senior career*
Years	Team	Apps	(Gls)
2002	VfB Stuttgart II	2	(0)
2003–2014	Galatasaray	39	(0)
2014–2015	Çaykur Rizespor	1	(0)
- * Club domestic league appearances and goals as of 15 October 2014

Aykut Erçetin (born 14 September 1982) is a Turkish former footballer who plays as a goalkeeper.

== Honours ==
Galatasaray

- Süper Lig: 2005–06, 2007–08, 2011–12, 2012–13
- Türkiye Kupası: 2004–05, 2013–14
- Süper Kupa: 2008, 2012, 2013,

== Career statistics ==
=== Club ===
As of 18 April 2015.

Club	Season	League		Cup		League Cup		Europe		Total	
Club	Season	Apps	Goals	Apps	Goals	Apps	Goals	Apps	Goals	Apps	Goals
Galatasaray	2003–04	7	0	1	0	0	0	0	0	8	0
Galatasaray	2004–05	0	0	0	0	0	0	0	0	0	0
Galatasaray	2005–06	0	0	4	0	0	0	0	0	4	0
Galatasaray	2006–07	4	0	2	0	0	0	0	0	6	0
Galatasaray	2007–08	13	0	6	0	1	0	1	0	21	0
Galatasaray	2008–09	1	0	6	0	—		2	0	9	0
Galatasaray	2009–10	7	0	4	0	—		1	0	12	0
Galatasaray	2010–11	6	0	2	0	—		3	0	11	0
Galatasaray	2011–12	1	0	0	0	0	0	—		1	0
Galatasaray	2012–13	0	0	0	0	0	0	—		0	0
Galatasaray	2013–14	0	0	3	0	0	0	—		3	0
Galatasaray	Total	39	0	28	0	1	0	7	0	75	0
Çaykur Rizespor	2014–15	1	0	9	0	—		—		10	0
Çaykur Rizespor	Total	1	0	9	0	—		—		10	0
Career total		40	0	37	0	1	0	7	0	85	0
