= Çağlar Birinci =

Turkish footballer

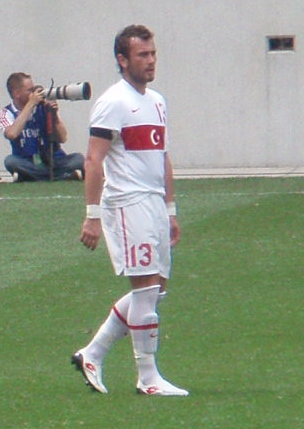
- Birinci playing for Turkey in 2010

Personal information
- Date of birth: 2 October 1985 (age 41)
- Place of birth: Trabzon, Turkey
- Height: 1.80 m (5 ft 11 in)
- Position: Central defender

Youth career
- 1995–2004: Trabzonspor

Senior career*
Years	Team	Apps	(Gls)
2004	Trabzonspor	0	(0)
2004–2005	→ Orduspor (loan)	1	(0)
2005–2006	Bakırköyspor	32	(2)
2006–2010	Denizlispor	73	(2)
2006	→ İstanbulspor (loan)	0	(0)
2007	→ Denizli Belediyespor (loan)	13	(0)
2010–2013	Galatasaray	13	(0)
2013–2014	Elazığspor	27	(0)
2014–2015	Akhisar Belediyespor	3	(0)
2015	Kayserispor	10	(2)
2015–2016	Karşıyaka	15	(1)
2017–2019	Giresunspor	42	(3)
2020–2021	Altay	4	(0)
2021–2022	Şanlıurfaspor	17	(1)

International career
2008	Turkey A2	1	(0)
2008–2011	Turkey	4	(0)
- * Club domestic league appearances and goals

Çağlar Birinci (Turkish pronunciation: [tʃaːˈɫaɾ biɾinˈdʒi]; born 2 October 1985) is a Turkish former footballer who played as a central defender.

== Club career ==
After a season with Denizlispor in the 2006–07 season, he secured a first-team place as a left-back. In the 2007–08 season, he was given the number 61 squad number, and became vice-captain., eventually becoming the captain. Çağlar joined Elazığspor when his contract expired on a free transfer and Akhisar Belediyespor the further season on 18 July 2014.

== International career ==
Çağlar was selected for Turkey's 2010 FIFA World Cup qualification games against Armenia and Belgium. Çağlar made his debut against Belgium, starting as left-back.

== Honours ==
Galatasaray

- Süper Lig: 2011–12, 2012–13
- Süper Kupa: 2012
