= Ufuk Ceylan =

Turkish professional football goalkeeper

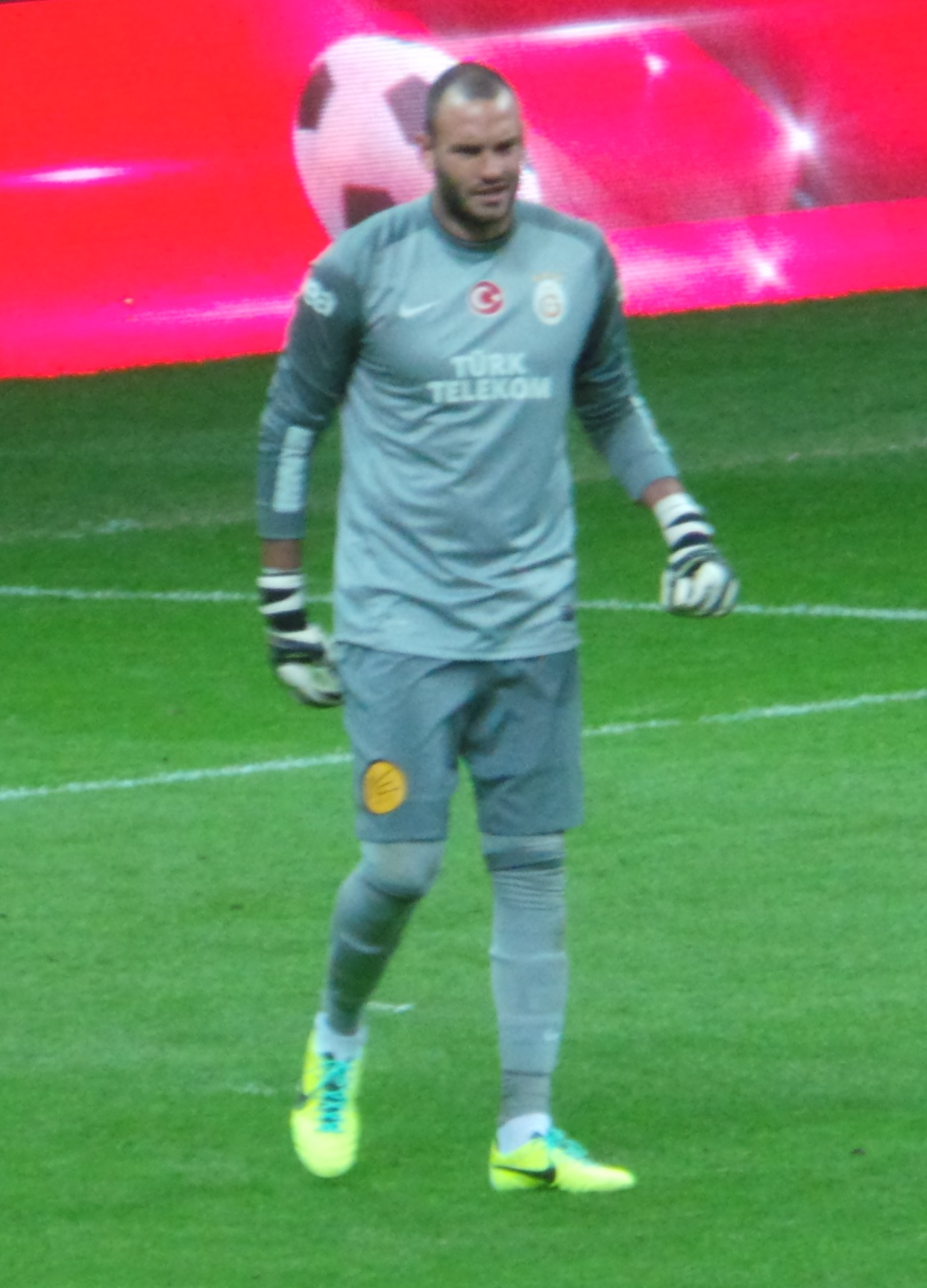
- Ceylan in 2013

Personal information
- Full name: Ufuk Ceylan
- Date of birth: 23 June 1986 (age 40)
- Place of birth: İzmir, Turkey
- Height: 1.94 m (6 ft 4 in)
- Position: Goalkeeper

Youth career
- 1998–2004: Altay

Senior career*
| Years | Team | Apps | (Gls) |
| 2004–2006 | Altay | 10 | (0) |
| 2006–2009 | Manisaspor | 52 | (0) |
| 2009–2014 | Galatasaray | 26 | (0) |
| 2014–2017 | İstanbul Başakşehir | 1 | (0) |
| 2017–2019 | Alanyaspor | 8 | (0) |
| 2019–2020 | Yeni Malatyaspor | 0 | (0) |
| 2020–2021 | Alanyaspor | 0 | (0) |

International career
| 2004–2006 | Turkey U19 | 14 | (0) |
| 2006–2008 | Turkey U21 | 22 | (0) |
| 2011 | Turkey A2 | 1 | (0) |
- * Club domestic league appearances and goals as of 15 March 2020

Ufuk Ceylan (Turkish pronunciation: [ufuk dʒejˈɫan], born 23 June 1986) is a Turkish professional footballer who plays as a goalkeeper.

== Club career ==
=== Galatasaray ===
On 2 September 2009, Ceylan signed for Galatasaray from Manisaspor, keeping him at the Istanbul club until June 2014. He made his debut for the club during a Turkish Cup match against Orduspor on 10 January 2010.

On 3 December 2013, was he the big name in the match after saving 4 penalties and taking Galatasaray through to the next round on the campaign's Turkish Cup.

== International career ==
He has represented his country several times at youth level. Fatih Terim called him up to the senior squad during some friendly matches against Ivory Coast, Azerbaijan and France but was an unused substitute.

== Career statistics ==
As of 6 October 2014.

=== Club ===
| Club | Season | League | | Cup | | League Cup | | Europe | | Total | |
| Club | Season | Apps | Goals | Apps | Goals | Apps | Goals | Apps | Goals | Apps | Goals |
|---|---|---|---|---|---|---|---|---|---|---|---|
| Manisaspor | 2005–06 | 2 | 0 | 0 | 0 | - | | - | | 2 | 0 |
| Manisaspor | 2006–07 | 6 | 0 | 1 | 0 | - | | - | | 7 | 0 |
| Manisaspor | 2007–08 | 16 | 0 | 2 | 0 | - | | - | | 18 | 0 |
| Manisaspor | Total | 24 | 0 | 2 | 0 | 0 | 0 | 0 | 0 | 27 | 0 |
| Galatasaray | 2009–10 | 0 | 0 | 3 | 0 | - | | 0 | 0 | 3 | 0 |
| Galatasaray | 2010–11 | 19 | 0 | 1 | 0 | - | | 2 | 0 | 22 | 0 |
| Galatasaray | 2011–12 | 1 | 0 | 2 | 0 | 0 | 0 | - | | 3 | 0 |
| Galatasaray | 2012–13 | 0 | 0 | 1 | 0 | 0 | 0 | 0 | 0 | 1 | 0 |
| Galatasaray | Total | 21 | 0 | 6 | 0 | 0 | 0 | 1 | 0 | 29 | 0 |
| Career total | | 45 | 0 | 12 | 0 | 0 | 0 | 3 | 0 | 89 | 0 |

== Honours ==
Galatasaray

- Süper Lig: 2011–12, 2012–13
- Süper Kupa: 2012, 2013
- Türkiye Kupası: 2013–14
