= Mehmet Batdal =

Turkish footballer (born 1986)

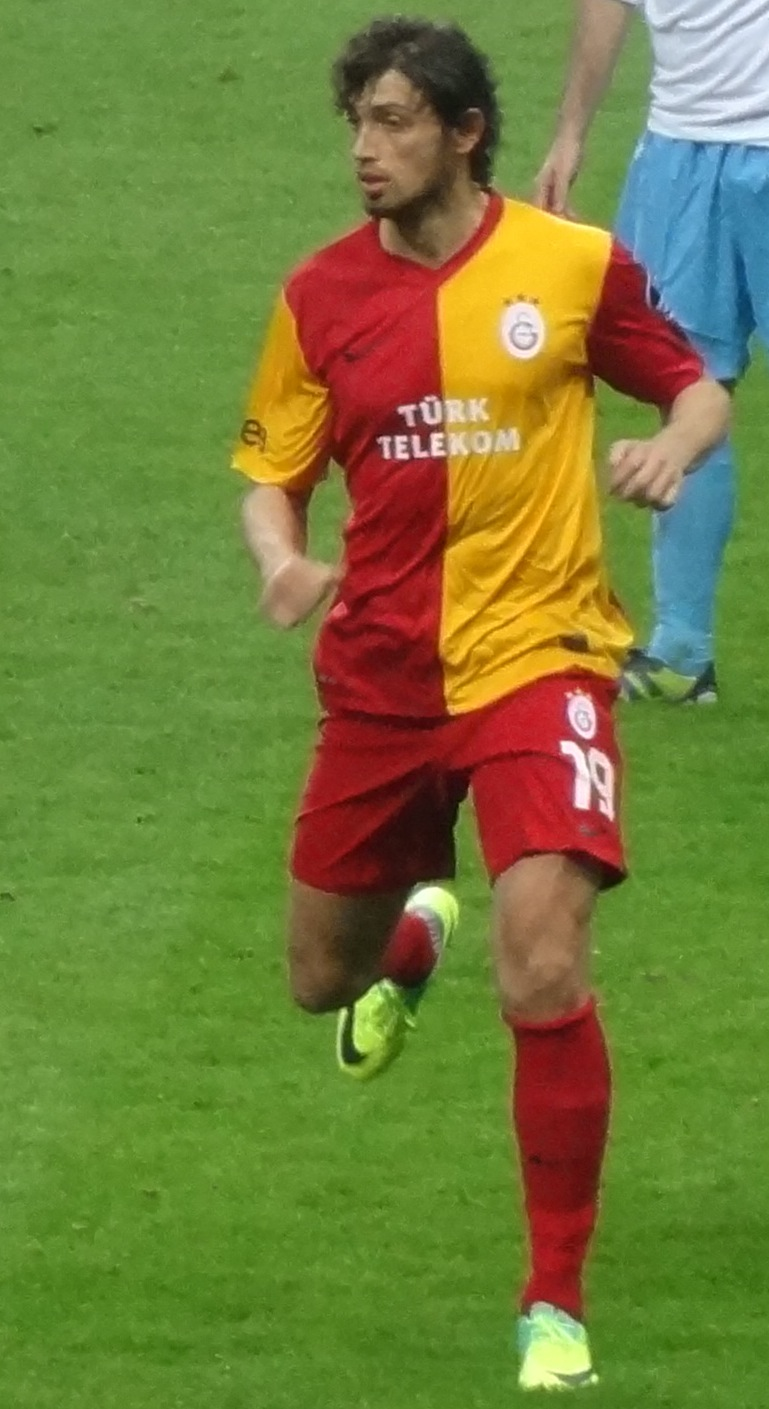
- Batdal in 2012

Personal information
- Date of birth: 24 February 1986 (age 40)
- Place of birth: İzmir, Turkey
- Height: 1.95 m (6 ft 5 in)
- Position: Striker

Youth career
- 1999–2005: Bucaspor

Senior career*
| Years | Team | Apps | (Gls) |
| 2005–2010 | Bucaspor | 109 | (39) |
| 2008 | → Altay (loan) | 10 | (1) |
| 2010–2013 | Galatasaray | 7 | (0) |
| 2010–2011 | → Konyaspor (loan) | 3 | (0) |
| 2011–2012 | → Karabükspor (loan) | 9 | (1) |
| 2012–2013 | → Bucaspor (loan) | 33 | (12) |
| 2013–2018 | İstanbul Başakşehir | 104 | (31) |
| 2018 | →Osmanlıspor (loan) | 8 | (2) |
| 2018–2020 | Fatih Karagümrük | 17 | (2) |

International career
| 2006–2008 | Turkey U21 | 11 | (0) |
| 2011 | Turkey A2 | 1 | (0) |
- * Club domestic league appearances and goals as of 29 May 2019

Mehmet Batdal (born 24 February 1986) is a former Turkish professional footballer who played as a forward. He last played for Fatih Karagümrük S.K.

== Club career ==
On 18 May 2010, Galatasaray signed Batdal on a three-year deal.

== International career ==
In November 2016 Batdal received his first call-up to the senior Turkey squad for the match against Kosovo.
