= 2011–12 Turkish Cup =

2011–12 Türkiye Kupası
Ziraat Türkiye Kupası

Tournament details
- Country: Turkey
- Dates: 7 December 2011 – 16 May 2012
- Teams: 57

Final positions
- Champions: Fenerbahçe (5th title)
- Runners-up: Bursaspor
- UEFA Europa League: Bursaspor

Tournament statistics
- Matches played: 56
- Goals scored: 171 (3.05 per match)
- Top goal scorer(s): (Chile) Sebastián Pinto (5 goals)

Awards
- Best player: (Brazil) Alex

2011–12 Turkish Cup (Turkish: Türkiye Kupası) was the 50th season of the Turkish Cup, won by Fenerbahçe. Ziraat Bankası was the sponsor of the tournament, thus the sponsored name was Ziraat Turkish Cup. The tournament began with first qualifying round matches played on 7 December 2011, and concluded at the 16 May 2012 final. As winners Fenerbahçe already secured a berth in 2012–13 UEFA Champions League through league position, the runners-up Bursaspor will enter 2012–13 UEFA Europa League in second qualifying round. By winning the cup, Fenerbahçe qualified for the 2012 Turkish Super Cup.

Due to scheduling conflicts in the 2011–12 Süper Lig, a format change has been made this season. The group stage matches that were contested between 2005 and 2011 have been abandoned. A knockout tournament format has been adopted. Also the number of participating teams have been reduced from 72 to 57. The new format change had two stages. First, teams were contested in four consecutive rounds for qualifying. After the qualifying stage, a final stage was contested between the 8 remaining teams. All of the final stage matches were contested in neutral venues. Among the 57 teams to compete for the trophy, Beşiktaş were the defending champions, but were eliminated in the fourth round by Boluspor.

== Teams and prize money ==
Round	Draw date	Match date(s)	New entries	Fixtures	Clubs	Prize per team ($)	Total prize ($)^{A}	Entering leagues
First round	24 November 2011	7 December 2011	22	11	57 → 46	20,000	440,000	TFF Second League
Second round	12 December 2011	20–22 December 2011	17	14	46 → 32	20,000	560,000	TFF First League
Third round	28 December 2011	10–12 January 2012	18	16	32 → 16	85,000	2,720,000	Süper Lig
Fourth round	7 March 2012	20–22 March 2012	–	8	16 → 8	115,000	1,840,000	–
Quarter-finals	23 March 2012	10–12 April 2012	–	4	8 → 4	140,000	1,120,000	–
Semi-finals	23 March 2012	25–26 April 2012	–	2	4 → 2	380,000	1,520,000	–
Final	23 March 2012	16 May 2012	–	1	2 → 1	900,000^{B}	2,300,000^{B}	–

- ^A Turkish Football Federation awarded prizes not by winning a round, but just for reaching the round. The final match was an exception, where runners-up received less than cup winners. The prize money was in United States dollars.
- ^B Winners of 2012 Turkish Cup Final received 500,000$ extra prize money, making the winners' prize sum 1,400,000$.

== First round ==
The draw for the first round took place at Crowne Plaza in Ankara on 24 November 2011. The matches were played on the first team's home ground on 7 December 2011. 11 winners proceeded to second round.

Team 1	Score	Team 2
Adana Demirspor	2–0	Elazığspor
Tepecikspor	0–1	Gaziosmanpaşaspor
Kırklarelispor	1–2 (a.e.t.)	Eyüpspor
Ünyespor	1–0	Sakaryaspor
Bugsaş Spor	2–1	Tokatspor
Çorumspor	1–0 (a.e.t.)	Beypazarı Şekerspor
Bandırmaspor	1–0	Turgutluspor
Denizli Belediyespor	1–3	Göztepe
Altınordu	1–2	Fethiyespor
Şanlıurfaspor	3–1	Yeni Malatyaspor
İskenderun Demir Çelikspor	0–1	Konya Torku Şekerspor

== Second round ==
The draw for the second round took place at Crowne Plaza in Ankara on 12 December 2011. In this round, the 11 winners from the first round matches were drawn against clubs which were unable to earn promotion from the TFF First League and the three relegated clubs from the top flight. Last six teams of the previous season's TFF First League were drawn against each other. Matches were played on first team's home ground on 20, 21 and 22 December 2011. 14 winners of this round advanced to the third round.

Team 1	Score	Team 2
Adanaspor	3–1	Kartalspor
Tavşanlı Linyitspor	0–2	Bugsaş Spor
Eyüpspor	2–1	Bucaspor
Gaziosmanpaşaspor	2–0	Giresunspor
Karşıyaka	1–2	Ünyespor
Şanlıurfaspor	1–0 (a.e.t.)	Denizlispor
Gaziantep B.B.	3–0	Göztepe
Kasımpaşa	4–2	Bandırmaspor
Akhisar Belediyespor	3–1	Altay
Adana Demirspor	2–1	Kayseri Erciyesspor
Çaykur Rizespor	6–0	Çorumspor
Konya Torku Şekerspor	5–1	Konyaspor
Boluspor	5–1	Fethiyespor
Diyarbakırspor	0–1	Güngörenspor

== Bracket ==
Third round
Galatasaray	4
Adana Demirspor	1
Mersin İdman Yurdu	1
Sivasspor (a.e.t.)	3
Bugsaş Spor	2
Manisaspor	1
Bursaspor	4
Şanlıurfaspor	1
Eyüpspor	2
Eskişehirspor	3
Ankaragücü	2
Kasımpaşa	6
Gaziosmanpaşaspor	1
Antalyaspor	3
Trabzonspor	2
Güngörenspor	0
Çaykur Rizespor	3
Gaziantepspor	2
Karabükspor	2
Ünyespor	0
Boluspor (a.e.t.)	3
Gençlerbirliği	2
Beşiktaş	2
Gaziantep B.B.	1
Fenerbahçe	4
Konya Torku Şekerspor	1
Samsunspor (p)	0(4)
Orduspor	0(2)
Akhisar Belediyespor	0
Kayserispor	1
Adanaspor	1
İstanbul B.B. (a.e.t.)	2

Fourth round
Galatasaray	0
Sivasspor	1
Bugsaş Spor	0
Bursaspor (a.e.t.)	2
Eskişehirspor	3
Kasımpaşa	0
Antalyaspor (a.e.t.)	2
Trabzonspor	1
Çaykur Rizespor	0
Karabükspor	1
Boluspor	1
Beşiktaş	0
Fenerbahçe	3
Samsunspor	0
Kayserispor	1
İstanbul B.B.	0

Quarter-finals
Sivasspor	1
Bursaspor	4
Eskişehirspor	3
Antalyaspor	0
Karabükspor	1
Boluspor	0
Fenerbahçe (p)	2(5)
Kayserispor	2(4)

Semi-finals
Bursaspor	3
Eskişehirspor	0
Karabükspor	0
Fenerbahçe	2

Final
Bursaspor	0
Fenerbahçe	4

== Third round ==
The third round was contested between 14 winners from the second round and the remaining 18 teams from the 2011–12 Süper Lig. A total of 32 teams competed in the third round. Unlike first two rounds, a seeding procedure was underway. First 14 teams of the previous season's Süper Lig were seeded and drawn against 14 winners from second round. Another pot consisted of the 15th team in previous season's Süper Lig and three promoted teams from previous season's TFF First League. Four teams of this pot were drawn against each other with no seedings. The draw ceremony took place at Ataköy Olympic House in Bakırköy, Istanbul on 28 December 2011. Matches were played on first team's home ground on 10, 11 and 12 January 2012.

10 January 2012 Third round	Bursaspor	4–1	Şanlıurfaspor	Bursa, Turkey
18:00 EET (UTC+02)	Ö. Erdoğan 7'; T. Bahadır 17', 30'; S. Aziz 26'	Report (in Turkish)	İ. Depe 28'	Stadium: Bursa Atatürk Stadium; Referee: Deniz Çoban

10 January 2012 Third round	Galatasaray	4–1	Adana Demirspor	Istanbul, Turkey
20:30 EET (UTC+02)	A. Akman 16'; E. Baytar 36'; S. Yıldırım 40', 67'	Report (in Turkish)	E. Evirgen 74'	Stadium: Türk Telekom Arena; Attendance: 15,425; Referee: Mustafa İlker Coşkun

11 January 2012 Third round	Akhisar Belediyespor	0–1	Kayserispor	Manisa, Turkey
13:00 EET (UTC+02)		Report (in Turkish)	Kujović 75'	Stadium: Akhisar Belediye Stadı; Referee: Serkan Çınar

11 January 2012 Third round	Bugsaş Spor	2–1	Manisaspor	Ankara, Turkey
13:00 EET (UTC+02)	Y. Çetin 41'; A. Kuleli 46'	Report (in Turkish)	Makukula 18'	Stadium: Yenikent Asaş Stadium; Attendance: 100; Referee: Mürvet Sezer

11 January 2012 Third round	Gaziosmanpaşaspor	1–3	Antalyaspor	Istanbul, Turkey
13:00 EET (UTC+02)	Y. Özeren 12'	Report (in Turkish)	Radeljić 23'; U. İnceman 51'; K. Özer 73'	Stadium: Gaziosmanpaşa Stadium; Attendance: 1,500; Referee: Murat Türker

11 January 2012 Third round	Eyüpspor	2–3	Eskişehirspor	Istanbul, Turkey
13:00 EET (UTC+02)	S.Esen 51' (pen.), 55'	Report (in Turkish)	D. Ângelo 76'; B. Eşer 83'; Pelé 87'	Stadium: Eyüp Stadium; Attendance: 800; Referee: Mustafa Öğretmenoğlu

11 January 2012 Third round	Boluspor	3–2 (a.e.t.)	Gençlerbirliği	Bolu, Turkey
13:35 EET (UTC+02)	O. Ak 48', 117'; F. Kiraz 98'	Report (in Turkish)	Curri 89'; Tum 113'	Stadium: Bolu Atatürk Stadium; Attendance: 2,000; Referee: Mete Kalkavan

11 January 2012 Third round	Karabükspor	2–0	Ünyespor	Karabük, Turkey
15:00 EET (UTC+02)	E. Taşkıran 7'; B. Kısa 17'	Report (in Turkish)		Stadium: Yenişehir Stadium; Referee: Ercan Hellaç

11 January 2012 Third round	Trabzonspor	2–0	Güngörenspor	Trabzon, Turkey
17:30 EET (UTC+02)	Alanzinho 11'; S. Kaya 61'	Report (in Turkish)		Stadium: Hüseyin Avni Aker Stadium; Attendance: 15,000; Referee: Kutluhan Bilgiç

11 January 2012 Third round	Adanaspor	1–2 (a.e.t.)	İstanbul B.B.	Adana, Turkey
18:00 EET (UTC+02)	O. Salmaz 57'	Report (in Turkish)	M. Akan 65'; Tom 106'	Stadium: Adana 5 Ocak Stadium; Referee: Taner Gizlenci

11 January 2012 Third round	Ankaragücü	2–6	Kasımpaşa	Ankara, Turkey
18:00 EET (UTC+02)	O. Evci 5'; K. Kanak 35'	Report (in Turkish)	M. Taşçı 7' (o.g.); H. Çolak 28'; A. Büyük 53', 75', 89'; Ş. Aygüneş 79'	Stadium: Ankara 19 Mayıs Stadium; Referee: Hakan Ceylan

11 January 2012 Third round	Mersin İdman Yurdu	1–3 (a.e.t.)	Sivasspor	Mersin, Turkey
18:00 EET (UTC+02)	N. Kaya 15'	Report (in Turkish)	C. Özkara 32'; U. Kavuk 97'; Eneramo 105'	Stadium: Tevfik Sırrı Gür Stadium; Attendance: 5,300; Referee: Abdullah Yılmaz

11 January 2012 Third round	Beşiktaş	2–1	Gaziantep B.B.	Istanbul, Turkey
20:00 EET (UTC+02)	V. Kavlak 2'; Fernandes 73'	Report (in Turkish)	K. Aslanoğlu 84'	Stadium: BJK İnönü Stadium; Referee: Özgüç Türkalp

11 January 2012 Third round	Samsunspor	0–0 (a.e.t.) (4–2 p)	Orduspor	Samsun, Turkey
20:30 EET (UTC+02)		Report (in Turkish)		Stadium: Samsun 19 Mayıs Stadium; Referee: Aytekin Durmaz
	Penalties
	Khubutia (penalty scored); A. Alkaşi (penalty scored); M. Yıldırım (penalty missed); Gekas (penalty scored); S. Özkan (penalty scored)		(penalty scored) Stancu; (penalty missed) Culio; (penalty missed) Y. Ayhan; (penalty scored) A. Çamdalı

12 January 2012 Third round	Çaykur Rizespor	3–2	Gaziantepspor	Rize, Turkey
13:00 EET (UTC+02)	Jallow 20'; Zeqiri 58'; F. Tatan 77'	Report (in Turkish)	M. Demir 47'; C. Tosun 87'	Stadium: Yeni Rize Şehir Stadı; Referee: Süleyman Abay

12 January 2012 Third round	Fenerbahçe	4–1	Konya Torku Şekerspor	Istanbul, Turkey
20:30 EET (UTC+02)	Bienvenu 10', 83', 85'; Alex 73'	Report (in Turkish)	E. Koç 89'	Stadium: Şükrü Saracoğlu Stadium; Attendance: 15,000; Referee: Koray Gençerler

== Fourth round ==
The fourth round was contested between 16 winners from the third round. A seeding procedure was underway for this round as were in the third round. Seeding was based on previous season's league positions and Turkish football league system. 8 winners in this round played in the finals stage. The draw ceremony took place at Ataköy Olympic House in Bakırköy, Istanbul on 7 March 2012. Matches were played on first team's home ground on 20, 21 and 22 March 2012. Bugsaş Spor were the lowest-ranked club in the fourth round, and were the only club remaining from the third tier of the Turkish football league system.

20 March 2012 Fourth round	Bugsaş Spor	0–2 (a.e.t.)	Bursaspor	Ankara, Turkey
13:00 EET (UTC+02)		Report (in Turkish)	Pinto 93'; T. Bahadır 118'	Stadium: Yenikent Asaş Stadium; Attendance: 1,000; Referee: Hakan Ceylan

20 March 2012 Fourth round	Galatasaray	0–1	Sivasspor	Istanbul, Turkey
20:30 EET (UTC+02)		Report (in Turkish)	E. Kılıç 48'	Stadium: Türk Telekom Arena; Attendance: 25,000; Referee: Mustafa Kamil Abitoğlu

21 March 2012 Fourth round	Antalyaspor	2–1 (a.e.t.)	Trabzonspor	Antalya, Turkey
18:00 EET (UTC+02)	E. Başsan 44'; M. Aydın 91'	Report (in Turkish)	B. Yılmaz 71' (pen.)	Stadium: Mardan Sports Complex; Attendance: 4,500; Referee: Süleyman Abay

21 March 2012 Fourth round	Çaykur Rizespor	0–1	Karabükspor	Rize, Turkey
18:00 EET (UTC+02)		Report (in Turkish)	M. Hacıoğlu 66' (o.g.)	Stadium: Yeni Rize Şehir Stadı; Attendance: 2,500; Referee: Kutluhan Bilgiç

21 March 2012 Fourth round	Eskişehirspor	3–0	Kasımpaşa	Eskişehir, Turkey
21:00 EET (UTC+02)	Kamara 48'; B. Karadeniz 71'; Dedê 78'	Report (in Turkish)		Stadium: Eskişehir Atatürk Stadium; Attendance: 10,000; Referee: Çağatay Şahan

21 March 2012 Fourth round	Fenerbahçe	3–0	Samsunspor	Istanbul, Turkey
21:00 EET (UTC+02)	Bienvenu 18'; Alex 21'; S. Şahin 34'	Report (in Turkish)		Stadium: Şükrü Saracoğlu Stadium; Attendance: 8,000; Referee: İlker Meral

22 March 2012 Fourth round	Boluspor	1–0	Beşiktaş	Bolu, Turkey
13:00 EET (UTC+02)	F. Kiraz 77'	Report (in Turkish)		Stadium: Bolu Atatürk Stadium; Attendance: 6,000; Referee: Halis Özkahya

22 March 2012 Fourth round	Kayserispor	1–0	İstanbul B.B.	Kayseri, Turkey
20:00 EET (UTC+02)	Troisi 49'	Report (in Turkish)		Stadium: Kadir Has Stadium; Attendance: 5,000; Referee: Serkan Çınar

== Quarter-finals ==
Quarter-finals were contested between 8 winners from the fourth round. All matches were played on neutral grounds. Boluspor was the lowest-ranked club in the quarter-finals, and the only club remaining from the second tier of the Turkish football league system. The draw ceremony for the final stage, including quarter-finals, semi-finals and final, took place at Ataköy Olympic House in Bakırköy, Istanbul on 23 March 2012.

10 April 2012 Quarter-final	Eskişehirspor	3–0	Antalyaspor	Istanbul, Turkey
20:30 EEST (UTC+03)	E. Zengin 41', 47'; B. Karadeniz 68'	Report (in Turkish)		Stadium: Şükrü Saracoğlu Stadium; Attendance: 10,000; Referee: Barış Şimşek

11 April 2012 Quarter-final	Fenerbahçe	2–2 (a.e.t.) (5−4 p)	Kayserispor	Ankara, Turkey
20:30 EEST (UTC+03)	Baroni 48'; Sow 89'	Report (in Turkish)	42' Amrabat; 46' Kujović	Stadium: Ankara 19 Mayıs Stadium; Attendance: 16,200; Referee: Özgür Yankaya
	Penalties
	S. Şentürk (penalty scored); Ziegler (penalty scored); S. Kesimal (penalty scored); Sow (penalty scored); Baroni (penalty scored)		(penalty scored) Riveros; (penalty scored) Troisi; (penalty missed) Kujović; (penalty scored) Pekarík; (penalty scored) H. A. Kaldırım

12 April 2012 Quarter-final	Karabükspor	1–0	Boluspor	Ankara, Turkey
18:30 EEST (UTC+03)	İ. Parlak 86'	Report (in Turkish)		Stadium: Ankara 19 Mayıs Stadium; Attendance: 7,500; Referee: Abdullah Yılmaz

12 April 2012 Quarter-final	Sivasspor	1–4	Bursaspor	Istanbul, Turkey
20:30 EEST (UTC+03)	U. Kavuk 57'	Report (in Turkish)	Batalla 6'; Pinto 36', 37'; Vederson 78'	Stadium: Şükrü Saracoğlu Stadium; Attendance: 20,800; Referee: Fırat Aydınus

== Semi-finals ==
Semi-final matches were contested between 4 winners from the quarter-finals. Both matches were played on neutral grounds on 25 and 26 April 2012. Winners Bursaspor and Fenerbahçe secured a berth in the final matchup.

25 April 2012 Semi-final	Bursaspor	3–0	Eskişehirspor	İzmir, Turkey
19:00 EEST (UTC+03)	Pinto 33', 46'; Batalla 54'	Report (in Turkish)		Stadium: İzmir Atatürk Stadium; Attendance: 21,000; Referee: İlker Meral

26 April 2012 Semi-final	Karabükspor	0–2	Fenerbahçe	Ankara, Turkey
19:00 EEST (UTC+03)		Report (in Turkish)	S. Şentürk 36'; Dia 58'	Stadium: Ankara 19 Mayıs Stadium; Attendance: 19,000; Referee: Tolga Özkalfa

== Final ==
The final was contested between semi-finals winners Bursaspor and Fenerbahçe. The match took place on 16 May 2012, at 20:30 local time. The venue for the match was Ankara 19 Mayıs Stadium, a neutral ground. Fenerbahçe won by a decisive score of four nil. Alex was named man of the match.

16 May 2012 Final	Bursaspor	0–4	Fenerbahçe	Ankara, Turkey
20:30 EEST (UTC+03)		Report (in Turkish)	C. Erkin 2'; Baroni 45'; S. Şentürk 58'; Alex 77'	Stadium: Ankara 19 Mayıs Stadium; Attendance: 19,500; Referee: Bülent Yıldırım; Man of the Match: Alex

== See also ==
- 2011–12 Süper Lig
- 2012 Turkish Super Cup
