= 2011–12 Süper Lig =

54th season of top-tier Turkish football

Süper Lig
- Season: 2011–12
- Champions: Galatasaray; 18th title
- Relegated: Ankaragücü; Manisaspor; Samsunspor
- Champions League: Galatasaray; Fenerbahçe
- Europa League: Trabzonspor; Bursaspor; Eskişehirspor
- Matches: 306
- Goals: 788 (2.58 per match)
- Top goalscorer: Burak Yılmaz (33 goals)
- Biggest home win: Fenerbahçe 6–1 Gençlerbirliği; Gaziantepspor 5–0 İstanbul BB
- Biggest away win: Ankaragücü 0–5 Kayserispor
- Highest scoring: Kayserispor 6–2 Sivasspor; Karabükspor 3–5 Mersin İdmanyurdu
- Longest winning run: 9 games Galatasaray
- Longest unbeaten run: 14 games Galatasaray
- Longest winless run: 16 games Ankaragücü
- Longest losing run: 15 games Ankaragücü
- Average attendance: 11,250

The 2011–12 Süper Lig (known as the Spor Toto Süper Lig for sponsorship reasons) was the 54th season of the Süper Lig, the top level football league of Turkey. Fenerbahçe were the defending champions. The start date of the league was due to be 7 August 2011, but due to the match fixing scandal in Turkey it began instead on 9 September 2011 and was concluded on 12 May 2012. Galatasaray won their 18th title. A new format was introduced this season, in which after the regular season two play-off groups were played to decide over the Champions League and Europa League starting rounds. Points of the regular season were halved for ranking in those.

== Teams ==
Locations of the 2011–12 Süper Lig teams

Bucaspor, Kasımpaşa and Konyaspor were relegated at the end of the 2010–11 season after finishing in the bottom three places of the standings.

The relegated teams were replaced by 2010–11 TFF First League champions Mersin İdmanyurdu, runners-up Samsunspor and Orduspor promotion play-off winners. Samsunspor returned to Süper Lig after 5 years of absence, and Mersin İdmanyurdu promoted to Turkey's top league after 28 years. Finally Orduspor returned to Süper Lig after 25 years of absence.

=== Team overview ===
Team	Home city	Head coach	Captain	Kit manufacturer	Shirt sponsor	Stadium	Capacity
Ankaragücü	Ankara	(Turkey) Hakan Kutlu	(Turkey) Aydın Toscalı	Lotto	Spor Toto	Ankara 19 Mayıs	19,209
Antalyaspor	Antalya	(Turkey) Mehmet Özdilek	(Turkey) Ömer Çatkıç	Puma	SunExpress	Mardan Sports Complex	7,428
Beşiktaş	Istanbul	(Turkey) Tayfur Havutçu	(Turkey) İbrahim Toraman	adidas	Toyota	BJK İnönü Stadium	42,590
Bursaspor	Bursa	(Turkey) Ertuğrul Sağlam	(Turkey) İbrahim Öztürk	Puma	InterCity	Bursa Atatürk	18,587
Eskişehirspor	Eskişehir	(Turkey) Ersun Yanal	(Turkey) Sezgin Coşkun	adidas	Eti	Eskişehir Atatürk	13,520
Fenerbahçe	Istanbul	(Turkey) Aykut Kocaman	(Brazil) Alex	adidas	Avea	Şükrü Saracoğlu	50,509
Galatasaray	Istanbul	(Turkey) Fatih Terim	(Turkey) Ayhan Akman	Nike	Türk Telekom	Türk Telekom Arena	52,652
Gaziantepspor	Gaziantep	(Turkey) Hikmet Karaman	(Turkey) Emre Güngör	adidas	TürkOil	Gaziantep Kamil Ocak	16,981
Gençlerbirliği	Ankara	(Turkey) Fuat Çapa	(Turkey) Cem Can	Lotto	Caprice Gold	Ankara 19 Mayıs	19,209
İstanbul BB	Istanbul	(Turkey) Arif Erdem	(Turkey) Efe İnanç	Nike	Spor Toto	Atatürk Olympic	76,092
Karabükspor	Karabük	(Turkey) Bülent Korkmaz	(Romania) Florin Cernat	Lescon	Kardemir	Dr. Necmettin Şeyhoğlu	7,593
Kayserispor	Kayseri	(Georgia (country)) Shota Arveladze	(Turkey) Eren Güngör	adidas	Spor Toto	Kadir Has	32,864
Manisaspor	Manisa	(Turkey) Reha Erginer	(Turkey) İlker Avcıbay	Lescon	Vestel	Manisa 19 Mayıs	16,597
Mersin İdmanyurdu	Mersin	(Turkey) Nurullah Sağlam	(Argentina) Christian Zurita	Hummel	Soil	Tevfik Sırrı Gür	10,128
Orduspor	Ordu	(Argentina) Héctor Cúper	(Ivory Coast) Jean-Jacques Gosso	Umbro	Spor Toto	Ordu 19 Eylül	11,024
Samsunspor	Samsun	(Turkey) Mesut Bakkal	(Turkey) Murat Yıldırım	Erreà	Spor Toto	Samsun 19 Mayıs	12,720
Sivasspor	Sivas	(Turkey) Rıza Çalımbay	(Turkey) Hayrettin Yerlikaya	adidas	Spor Toto	Sivas 4 Eylül	14,998
Trabzonspor	Trabzon	(Turkey) Şenol Güneş	(Turkey) Tolga Zengin	Nike	Türk Telekom	Hüseyin Avni Aker	24,169

=== Managerial changes ===
Team	Outgoing manager	Manner of departure	Date of vacancy	Replaced by	Date of appointment
Gaziantepspor	(Turkey) Tolunay Kafkas	Resigned	26 September 2011	(Turkey) Abdullah Ercan	30 September 2011
Karabükspor	(Turkey) Yücel İldiz	Resigned	5 November 2011	(Turkey) Bülent Korkmaz	8 November 2011
İstanbul BB	(Turkey) Abdullah Avcı	Assigned as Turkey head coach	17 November 2011	(Turkey) Arif Erdem	18 November 2011
Ankaragücü	(Turkey) Ziya Doğan	Resigned	13 December 2011	(Turkey) Hakan Kutlu	14 December 2011
Orduspor	(Turkey) Metin Diyadin	Resigned	13 December 2011	(Argentina) Héctor Cúper	19 December 2011
Eskişehirspor	(Germany) Michael Skibbe	Mutually terminated	22 December 2011	(Turkey) Ersun Yanal	24 December 2011
Manisaspor	(Turkey) Kemal Özdeş	Resigned	24 January 2012	(Turkey) Ümit Özat	26 January 2012
Gaziantepspor	(Turkey) Abdullah Ercan	Resigned	26 January 2012	(Turkey) Hikmet Karaman	26 January 2012
Samsunspor	(Bosnia and Herzegovina) Vladimir Petković	Resigned	27 January 2012	(Turkey) Mesut Bakkal	27 January 2012
Manisaspor	(Turkey) Ümit Özat	Mutually terminated	28 February 2012	(Turkey) Reha Erginer	29 February 2012

=== Foreign players ===
Club	Player 1	Player 2	Player 3	Player 4	Player 5	Player 6	Player 7	Player 8	Former Players
Ankaragücü									(Czech Republic) Jaroslav Černý (Czech Republic) Jan Rajnoch (Liberia) Theo Lewis Weeks (Liberia) Tonia Tisdell (Slovakia) Stanislav Šesták
Antalyaspor	(Bosnia and Herzegovina) Ivan Radeljić	(Brazil) Jabá	(Bulgaria) Veselin Minev	(Cameroon) Sammy Ndjock	(Czech Republic) Petr Janda	(Tunisia) Ali Zitouni			
Beşiktaş	(Brazil) Edu	(Brazil) Sidnei	(Czech Republic) Tomáš Sivok	(Portugal) Bebé	(Portugal) Hugo Almeida	(Portugal) Manuel Fernandes	(Portugal) Ricardo Quaresma	(Portugal) Simão	(Germany) Roberto Hilbert (Portugal) Júlio Alves (Slovakia) Filip Hološko (Spain) Guti
Bursaspor	(Argentina) Pablo Batalla	(Chile) Sebastián Pinto	(France) Alfred N'Diaye	(England) Scott Carson	(Morocco) Basser Chrétien	(Serbia) Milan Stepanov	(Sierra Leone) Teteh Bangura	(Slovakia) Stanislav Šesták	(Argentina) Federico Insúa (Ghana) Prince Tagoe (Sweden) Gustav Svensson
Eskişehirspor	(Bosnia and Herzegovina) Safet Nadarević	(Brazil) Dedé	(Brazil) Diego Ângelo	(Chile) Rodrigo Tello	(Croatia) Vanja Iveša	(Hungary) Ákos Elek	(Portugal) Pelé	(Senegal) Diomansy Kamara	(Scotland) Kris Boyd
Fenerbahçe	(Brazil) Alex	(Brazil) Cristian	(Cameroon) Henri Bienvenu	(Nigeria) Joseph Yobo	(Senegal) Issiar Dia	(Senegal) Moussa Sow	(Slovakia) Miroslav Stoch	(Switzerland) Reto Ziegler	(Brazil) Bilica
Galatasaray	(Brazil) Felipe Melo	(Czech Republic) Milan Baroš	(Czech Republic) Tomáš Ujfaluši	(Ivory Coast) Emmanuel Eboué	(Spain) Albert Riera	(Sweden) Johan Elmander	(Uruguay) Fernando Muslera		
Gaziantepspor	(Argentina) Ismael Sosa	(Brazil) Ivan	(Bulgaria) Ivelin Popov	(Cameroon) Dany Nounkeu	(Cameroon) Gilles Binya	(Lithuania) Žydrūnas Karčemarskas	(Slovakia) Marek Sapara		(Brazil) Wágner (Togo) Arafat Djako
Gençlerbirliği	(Albania) Debatik Curri	(Bosnia and Herzegovina) Ermin Zec	(Cameroon) Hervé Tum	(Costa Rica) Randall Azofeifa	(Croatia) Ante Kulušic	(Democratic Republic of the Congo) Joachim Mununga			(Sweden) Labinot Harbuzi
İstanbul BB	(Bosnia and Herzegovina) Edin Višća	(Bosnia and Herzegovina) Kenan Hasagić	(Brazil) Doka Madureira	(Brazil) Tom	(Cameroon) Pierre Webó	(Guinea) Kamil Zayatte	(Poland) Marcin Kuś	(Sweden) Samuel Holmén	(Brazil) Marcus Vinicius
Karabükspor	(Algeria) Jugurtha Hamroun	(Bosnia and Herzegovina) Sanel Jahić	(Croatia) Anthony Šerić	(Croatia) Vjekoslav Tomić	(Democratic Republic of the Congo) Larrys Mabiala	(Jamaica) Luton Shelton	(Romania) Florin Cernat	(Tunisia) Hocine Ragued	(Cameroon) Armand Deumi (Serbia) Danilo Nikolić
Kayserispor	(Argentina) Nicolás Navarro	(Australia) James Troisi	(Georgia (country)) Zurab Khizanishvili	(Morocco) Nordin Amrabat	(Netherlands) Diego Biseswar	(Paraguay) Cristian Riveros	(Slovakia) Peter Pekarík	(Sweden) Emir Kujović	(Argentina) Franco Cángele (Paraguay) Jonathan Santana
Manisaspor	(Brazil) Cláudio Pitbull	(Brazil) Kahê	(Canada) Michael Klukowski	(Ghana) Jerry Akaminko	(Liberia) Jimmy Dixon	(Nigeria) Isaac Promise	(Serbia) 'Nemanja Vučićević	(Sweden) Labinot Harbuzi	(Canada) Josh Simpson (Poland) Maciej Iwański (Portugal) Ariza Makukula
Mersin İdmanyurdu	(Argentina) Christian Zurita	(Bosnia and Herzegovina) Ibrahim Šehić	(Brazil) André Moritz	(Brazil) Danilo Bueno	(Bulgaria) Spas Delev	(Cameroon) Joseph Boum	(Nigeria) Nduka Ozokwo	(Tunisia) Wissem Ben Yahia	(Brazil) Beto (France) Yannick Kamanan (Ghana) Matthew Amoah (Liberia) Tonia Tisdell
Orduspor	(Argentina) Emmanuel Culio	(Brazil) Bruno Mezenga	(France) Wilfried Dalmat	(Ivory Coast) Jean-Jacques Gosso	(Portugal) Miguel Garcia	(Romania) Bogdan Stancu	(Slovenia) Sašo Fornezzi	(Spain) Javito	(Germany) Tobias Nickenig (Ghana) Emmanuel Banahene (Portugal) João Ribeiro
Samsunspor	(Brazil) André Bahia	(Georgia (country)) Akaki Khubutia	(Germany) Michael Fink	(Greece) Theofanis Gekas	(Hungary) Pál Lázár	(Nigeria) Ekigho Ehiosun	(Nigeria) Simon Zenke	(Slovenia) Dejan Kelhar	(Brazil) Valdomiro (Burkina Faso) Aristide Bancé (Colombia) Álvaro Domínguez
Sivasspor	(Bolivia) Ricardo Pedriel	(Czech Republic) Jakub Navrátil	(Czech Republic) Milan Černý	(Czech Republic) Tomáš Rada	(Czech Republic) Jan Rajnoch	(Nigeria) Michael Eneramo	(Poland) Kamil Grosicki	(Slovakia) Štefan Senecký	(Brazil) Sandro (Canada) Milan Borjan (Denmark) Morten Rasmussen (Senegal) Jacques Faty
Trabzonspor	(Argentina) Gustavo Colman	(Brazil) Alanzinho	(Brazil) Paulo Henrique	(Czech Republic) Ondřej Čelůstka	(Ivory Coast) Didier Zokora	(Poland) Adrian Mierzejewski	(Slovakia) Marek Čech		(Poland) Paweł Brożek (Slovakia) Marek Sapara (Slovakia) Róbert Vittek

== League table ==
Pos	Team	Pld	W	D	L	GF	GA	GD	Pts	Qualification or relegation
1	Galatasaray	34	23	8	3	69	24	+45	77	Qualification to Süper Final, Championship group
2	Fenerbahçe	34	20	8	6	61	34	+27	68	Qualification to Süper Final, Championship group
3	Trabzonspor	34	15	11	8	60	39	+21	56	Qualification to Süper Final, Championship group
4	Beşiktaş	34	15	10	9	50	39	+11	55	Qualification to Süper Final, Championship group
5	Eskişehirspor	34	14	8	12	42	41	+1	50 (Note: Eskişehirspor were ahead of İstanbul B.B. and Sivasspor on head-to-head points: Eskişehirspor: 8 pts, İstanbul B.B.: 5 pts, Sivasspor: 2 pts.)	Qualification to Süper Final, Europa League group
6	İstanbul B.B.	34	14	8	12	48	49	−1	50	Qualification to Süper Final, Europa League group
7	Sivasspor	34	13	11	10	57	54	+3	50	Qualification to Süper Final, Europa League group
8	Bursaspor	34	13	10	11	44	35	+9	49 (Note: Bursaspor were ahead of Gençlerbirliği on head-to-head record: Bursaspor–Gençlerbirliği 4–0, Gençlerbirliği–Bursaspor 2–2.)	Qualification to Süper Final, Europa League group
9	Gençlerbirliği	34	13	10	11	49	48	+1	49	
10	Gaziantepspor	34	13	9	12	39	33	+6	48	
11	Kayserispor	34	13	5	16	42	39	+3	44 (Note: Kayserispor were ahead of Kardemir Karabükspor on head-to-head record: Kayserispor–Kardemir Karabükspor 2–0, Kardemir Karabükspor–Kayserispor 1–0.)	
12	Kardemir Karabükspor	34	13	5	16	44	56	−12	44	
13	Mersin İdman Yurdu	34	12	6	16	34	45	−11	42 (Note: Mersin İdman Yurdu were ahead of Orduspor on head-to-head record: Mersin İdman Yurdu–Orduspor 1–0, Orduspor–Mersin İdman Yurdu 0–1.)	
14	Orduspor	34	10	12	12	28	34	−6	42	
15	Antalyaspor	34	10	9	15	32	42	−10	39	
16	Samsunspor (R)	34	9	9	16	36	47	−11	36	Relegation to 2012–13 TFF First League
17	Manisaspor (R)	34	8	8	18	31	52	−21	32	Relegation to 2012–13 TFF First League
18	MKE Ankaragücü (R)	34	2	5	27	22	77	−55	11	Relegation to 2012–13 TFF First League

Source: TFF's official Süper Lig website
Rules for classification: 1) points; 2) goal difference; 3) number of goals scored.
(R) Relegated

=== Positions by round ===
Team ╲ Round	1	2	3	4	5	6	7	8	9	10	11	12	13	14	15	16	17	18	19	20	21	22	23	24	25	26	27	28	29	30	31	32	33	34
MKE Ankaragücü	12	15	17	17	18	18	18	18	18	18	18	18	18	18	18	18	18	18	18	18	18	18	18	18	18	18	18	18	18	18	18	18	18	18
Antalyaspor	7	5	6	8	10	14	11	13	14	14	14	14	13	14	12	12	12	13	12	9	9	11	11	13	10	13	10	12	14	15	15	15	15	15
Beşiktaş	13	6	5	3	4	7	5	6	4	7	6	5	3	3	3	3	3	3	3	3	3	3	3	3	3	3	3	3	4	4	4	4	4	4
Bursaspor	1	1	4	7	6	8	8	8	9	12	8	10	10	12	13	13	13	12	9	11	12	13	10	12	12	10	9	9	8	7	5	6	5	8
Eskişehirspor	4	2	1	5	9	12	15	15	10	8	12	9	7	4	4	4	4	4	4	7	7	7	9	7	7	7	7	7	6	5	6	8	8	5
Fenerbahçe	8	3	2	2	1	1	1	1	1	1	1	1	1	2	2	2	2	2	2	2	2	2	2	2	2	2	2	2	2	2	2	2	2	2
Galatasaray	17	8	8	6	2	2	2	3	2	3	3	2	2	1	1	1	1	1	1	1	1	1	1	1	1	1	1	1	1	1	1	1	1	1
Gaziantepspor	15	16	18	18	17	17	17	14	15	15	15	17	15	15	15	15	15	14	14	15	14	15	14	15	15	16	16	15	13	14	13	10	10	10
Gençlerbirliği	11	7	8	11	14	9	12	9	11	10	10	11	12	10	9	6	5	5	6	5	4	6	5	5	4	5	5	5	5	6	7	7	6	9
İstanbul B.B.	2	4	3	1	3	2	4	4	3	4	5	4	5	6	6	7	9	11	13	13	10	8	7	8	8	8	8	8	9	9	9	9	9	6
Kardemir Karabükspor	5	8	8	14	15	16	14	16	16	16	16	15	16	16	16	16	16	17	16	16	16	16	16	16	16	15	14	14	15	13	14	14	11	12
Kayserispor	18	17	13	15	16	13	9	11	13	13	13	13	11	9	8	9	7	9	10	10	11	9	8	9	9	11	12	13	11	12	12	13	13	11
Manisaspor	9	13	15	16	13	11	7	5	7	5	4	3	4	5	5	8	10	10	11	12	13	12	15	14	14	14	15	16	17	16	16	17	17	17
Mersin İdmanyurdu	6	12	7	4	5	6	10	12	8	9	9	7	8	8	7	5	6	7	8	8	8	10	13	11	13	12	13	11	10	11	10	11	12	13
Orduspor	16	10	11	12	8	5	3	2	6	6	7	8	9	13	14	14	14	15	15	14	15	14	12	10	11	9	11	10	11	10	11	12	14	14
Samsunspor	3	11	12	13	12	15	16	17	17	17	17	16	17	17	17	17	17	16	17	17	17	17	17	17	17	17	17	17	16	17	17	16	16	16
Sivasspor	14	18	14	9	11	10	13	10	12	11	11	12	14	11	11	11	11	8	7	6	5	4	6	6	6	6	6	6	7	8	8	5	7	7
Trabzonspor	10	13	16	10	7	4	6	7	5	2	2	6	6	7	10	10	8	6	5	4	6	5	4	4	5	4	4	4	3	3	3	3	3	3

Qualification for Süper Final, Championship group
Qualification for Süper Final, Europa League group
Relegation to 2012–13 TFF First League

Source: tff.org (in Turkish)

== Results ==
Home \ Away	MKE	ANT	BEŞ	BUR	ESK	FEN	GAL	GAZ	GEN	İBB	KRB	KAY	MAN	MİY	ORD	SAM	SİV	TRA
MKE Ankaragücü		0–3	0–0	0–0	2–5	0–2	0–3	0–0	0–1	1–2	2–1	0–5	0–1	1–2	0–2	0–3	1–2	0–4
Antalyaspor	1–0		1–2	1–3	0–0	0–0	0–0	1–0	2–2	2–1	2–1	1–0	2–1	1–2	1–1	0–2	2–2	2–1
Beşiktaş	3–1	1–0		3–1	2–0	2–2	0–0	3–2	3–2	1–1	1–0	0–2	4–1	0–1	2–1	0–1	3–1	1–2
Bursaspor	2–1	0–0	1–2		0–1	0–2	1–0	0–2	4–0	2–1	3–0	3–0	0–0	1–0	0–0	1–0	1–2	1–1
Eskişehirspor	3–2	1–0	2–1	1–1		2–1	0–0	0–2	0–0	3–1	1–2	1–0	0–2	2–0	0–1	1–0	1–1	0–2
Fenerbahçe	4–2	2–0	2–0	1–0	1–0		2–2	3–1	6–1	4–2	1–0	4–0	1–1	2–1	1–0	0–0	4–2	1–0
Galatasaray	4–0	1–1	3–2	2–1	2–0	3–1		2–4	2–0	4–1	5–1	1–0	1–0	0–0	2–0	3–1	2–1	1–1
Gaziantepspor	1–0	1–0	0–0	2–2	0–1	1–3	1–2		3–0	5–0	3–0	1–2	1–1	1–0	1–0	1–0	2–1	0–1
Gençlerbirliği	1–1	3–0	4–2	2–2	2–1	0–0	0–1	1–0		4–0	2–1	1–0	3–0	1–2	3–1	1–1	3–3	1–1
İstanbul B.B.	3–0	4–0	2–2	0–0	2–2	3–2	2–0	3–1	1–0		2–2	1–0	3–2	0–0	1–1	3–0	1–1	0–2
Kardemir Karabükspor	3–2	2–1	1–1	3–1	1–2	2–1	1–1	0–0	2–1	2–0		1–0	2–1	3–5	1–2	2–1	2–1	2–1
Kayserispor	3–0	0–1	1–0	0–2	2–2	0–1	0–2	1–1	2–3	1–0	2–0		2–0	2–2	1–0	2–0	6–2	3–3
Manisaspor	2–0	1–0	1–4	1–3	2–3	1–2	0–4	0–2	0–1	0–2	2–1	1–0		2–0	0–0	1–1	1–3	1–1
Mersin İdmanyurdu	1–2	0–2	0–1	1–3	0–0	1–2	1–3	2–0	2–1	2–0	0–2	1–2	0–0		1–0	1–0	1–5	1–1
Orduspor	2–0	3–2	1–1	1–1	2–1	1–1	0–2	0–0	0–0	1–0	3–2	1–0	1–0	0–1		0–0	1–2	0–0
Samsunspor	2–2	1–0	1–1	0–3	3–1	3–1	2–4	0–0	3–2	2–4	0–0	0–1	1–2	2–0	2–0		1–2	1–1
Sivasspor	3–0	2–1	1–1	3–0	0–4	2–0	0–4	0–0	1–1	0–1	2–0	1–1	2–2	1–0	1–1	3–2		2–2
Trabzonspor	3–2	2–2	0–1	2–1	4–1	1–1	0–3	4–0	1–2	0–1	3–1	2–1	2–1	2–3	4–1	4–0	2–1	

Source: tff.org (in Turkish)
Legend: Blue = home team win; Yellow = draw; Red = away team win.

== European play-offs ==
=== Championship group ===
Pos	Team	Pld	W	D	L	GF	GA	GD	Pts	Qualification	GAL	FEN	TRA	BEŞ
1	Galatasaray (C)	6	2	3	1	9	6	+3	48	Qualification to Champions League group stage		1–2	0–0	2–2
2	Fenerbahçe	6	4	1	1	9	4	+5	47	Qualification to Champions League third qualifying round	0–0		2–0	2–1
3	Trabzonspor	6	1	2	3	5	10	−5	33	Qualification to Europa League play-off round (Note: Trabzonspor entered the play-off round as Fenerbahçe, the winners of the 2011–12 Turkish Cup, already qualified for the Champions League. Moreover, as Beşiktaş is banned 1 year from European football, Europa League spots shifted down, so Bursaspor start from the third qualifying round, as well as Eskişehirspor start from the second qualifying round.)	2–4	1–3		1–0
4	Beşiktaş	6	1	2	3	5	8	−3	33	Banned from 2012–13 European competitions (Note: See 2012–13 UEFA Europa League qualification play-off match. Moreover, as Beşiktaş is banned 1 year from European football, Europa League spots shifted down.)	0–2	1–0	1–1	

Source: SporToto Süper Lig official website
Legend: Blue = home team win; Yellow = draw; Red = away team win.
Rules for classification: 1) points; 2) goal difference; 3) number of goals scored.
(C) Champions

=== Europa League group ===
Pos	Team	Pld	W	D	L	GF	GA	GD	Pts	Qualification	BUR	ESK	İBB	SİV
5	Bursaspor	6	4	0	2	12	10	+2	37	Qualification to Europa League third qualifying round (Note: See 2012–13 UEFA Europa League qualification play-off match. Moreover, as Beşiktaş is banned 1 year from European football, Europa League spots shifted down.)		3–2	3–2	2–0
6	Eskişehirspor	6	3	2	1	12	7	+5	36	Qualification to Europa League second qualifying round	2–0		3–1	1–1
7	İstanbul B.B.	6	2	1	3	10	14	−4	32		0–4	1–1		4–2
8	Sivasspor	6	1	1	4	9	12	−3	29		4–0	1–3	1–2	

Source: SporToto Süper Lig official website
Legend: Blue = home team win; Yellow = draw; Red = away team win.
Rules for classification: 1) points; 2) goal difference; 3) number of goals scored.

=== 2012–13 UEFA Europa League qualification play-off match ===
Beşiktaş (the fourth-placed team of the Champions League group) and the winners of the Europa League group would play for a spot in the second qualifying round of the 2012–13 UEFA Europa League. But the match was cancelled as Bursaspor, the 2011–12 Turkish Cup finalists against Champions League-qualified Fenerbahçe, wins the Europa League group. Bursaspor lost the cup final, and as a result, they qualified for the Europa League second qualifying round, and Beşiktaş qualified for the Europa League third qualifying round. But on 30 May 2012; UEFA banned Beşiktaş one year from UEFA competitions, so UEFA Europa League spots shifted down. Bursaspor were also initially banned from entering the Europa League, but this was overturned by the Court of Arbitration for Sport.

== Spor Toto Cup ==
=== Group A ===
Pos	Team	Pld	W	D	L	GF	GA	GD	Pts	Qualification	ORD	KRB	MKE	SAM
1	Orduspor	6	6	0	0	17	6	+11	18	Qualification to Spor Toto Cup Final		2–1	2–1	1–0
2	Kardemir Karabükspor	6	3	1	2	14	10	+4	10		2–4		3–1	1–1
3	MKE Ankaragücü	6	1	1	4	4	13	−9	4		0–3	1–5		1–0
4	Samsunspor	6	0	2	4	4	10	−6	2		2–5	1–2	0–0	

Source: TFF
Legend: Blue = home team win; Yellow = draw; Red = away team win.
Rules for classification: 1) points; 2) goal difference; 3) number of goals scored.

=== Group B ===
Pos	Team	Pld	W	D	L	GF	GA	GD	Pts	Qualification	GAZ	GEN	ANT	KAY
1	Gaziantepspor	6	4	0	2	15	9	+6	12	Qualification to Spor Toto Cup Final		4–0	3–1	3–2
2	Gençlerbirliği	6	3	0	3	9	10	−1	9		0–2		3–2	0–1
3	Antalyaspor	6	3	0	3	12	12	0	9		4–2	1–3		3–1
4	Kayserispor	6	2	0	4	6	11	−5	6		2–1	0–3	0–1	

Source: TFF
Legend: Blue = home team win; Yellow = draw; Red = away team win.
Rules for classification: 1) points; 2) goal difference; 3) number of goals scored.

=== Spor Toto Cup Final ===
17 May 2012	Orduspor	1–3	Gaziantepspor	Istanbul, Turkey
20:00 EEST	H. Özmert 38'	Report (in Turkish)	C. Tosun 18' (pen.), 82'; Popov 87'	Stadium: BJK İnönü Stadium; Attendance: 11,000; Referee: İlker Meral

== Top goalscorers ==
Including play-off matches

Rank	Player	Club	Goals
1	(Turkey) Burak Yılmaz	Trabzonspor	33
2	(Senegal) Diomansy Kamara	Eskişehirspor	15
2	(Cameroon) Herve Tum	Gençlerbirliği	15
2	(Nigeria) Michael Eneramo	Sivasspor	15
2	(Cameroon) Pierre Webó	İstanbul BB	15
6	(Brazil) Alex	Fenerbahçe	14
6	(Brazil) Doka Madureira	İstanbul BB	14
8	(Turkey) Necati Ateş	Antalyaspor/Galatasaray	13
8	(Argentina) Pablo Batalla	Bursaspor	13
8	(Turkey) Selçuk İnan	Galatasaray	13

=== Hat-tricks ===
Player	For	Against	Result	Date
(Turkey) Burak Yılmaz	Trabzonspor	Kardemir Karabükspor	3–1	24 September 2011
(Turkey) Burak Yılmaz	Trabzonspor	Orduspor	4–1	22 December 2011
(Greece) Theofanis Gekas	Samsunspor	Fenerbahçe	3–1	2 February 2012

== Awards ==
=== Annual awards ===
Award	Winner	Club
FONEX Goalkeeper of the Year	(Turkey) Volkan Demirel	(Turkey) Fenerbahçe
FONEX Defender of the Year	(Czech Republic) Tomáš Ujfaluši	(Turkey) Galatasaray
FONEX Midfielder of the Year	(Turkey) Selçuk İnan	(Turkey) Galatasaray
FONEX Forward of the Year	(Turkey) Burak Yılmaz	(Turkey) Trabzonspor
FONEX Young Talent of the Year	(Turkey) Semih Kaya	(Turkey) Galatasaray
FONEX Managers of the Year	(Turkey) Fatih Terim (Turkey) Aykut Kocaman	(Turkey) Galatasaray (Turkey) Fenerbahçe
FONEX Referee of the Year	(Turkey) Cüneyt Çakır	—

Team of the Year
Goalkeeper	(Uruguay) Fernando Muslera (Galatasaray)			
Defence	(Ivory Coast) Emmanuel Eboué (Galatasaray)	(Czech Republic) Tomáš Ujfaluši (Galatasaray)	(Nigeria) Joseph Yobo (Fenerbahçe)	(Switzerland) Reto Ziegler (Fenerbahçe)
Midfield	(Morocco) Nordin Amrabat (Kayserispor)	(Turkey) Selçuk İnan (Galatasaray)	(Brazil) Alex (Fenerbahçe)	(Slovakia) Miroslav Stoch (Fenerbahçe)
Forwards	(Sweden) Johan Elmander (Galatasaray)		(Turkey) Burak Yılmaz (Trabzonspor)	
