= 2012 Turkish Cup final =

- Event: 2011–12 Turkish Cup
Bursaspor	Fenerbahçe
0	4
- Date: 16 May 2012
- Venue: Ankara 19 Mayıs Stadium, Ankara
- Man of the Match: (Brazil) Alex
- Referee: (Turkey) Bülent Yıldırım
- Attendance: 19,500
- Weather: Clear

The 2012 Turkish Cup final (Turkish: Türkiye Kupası Finali) was the 50th final of the Turkish Cup. The final was contested between Bursaspor and Fenerbahçe. Match was played on 16 May 2012, at 20:30 local time. The venue chosen for the match was Ankara 19 Mayıs Stadium, a neutral ground for both clubs. Fenerbahçe were the winners of the match, and eventual winners of the 2011–12 Turkish Cup.

== Path to the final ==
Bursaspor entered the tournament in the third round. They played their first match at their home ground against Şanlıurfaspor, a TFF Second League club. In the fourth round, they faced another TFF Second League club in an away game, and won after extra time. In the quarter-finals stage, they faced a Süper Lig club, Sivasspor in a neutral venue in Istanbul for both sides. Bursaspor played their fourth match in the tournament against Eskişehirspor, this time in İzmir, another neutral venue. A 3–0 semi-final win against their rivals paved the way for the final against Fenerbahçe.

The other finalist Fenerbahçe had also entered the tournament in the third round. Their first match was against Konya Torku Şekerspor, a TFF Second League club, on Fenerbahçe's home ground. Their fourth round match was against TFF First League side Samsunspor. In the finals stage, Fenerbahçe played all of their matches (including the final) in Ankara 19 Mayıs Stadium, a neutral venue for the club. The quarter-final match was against Kayserispor, a game won by a dramatic penalty shoot-out. In the semi-finals stage they played against Karabükspor and won by 2–0, paving the way to the final.

== Background ==
This was the 5th final for Bursaspor, who only won the cup in 1986. On the other hand, Fenerbahçe had won the cup four times before. This match was their 14th finals appearance. Both teams have played against each other in the 1974 final, a two-legged tie won by Fenerbahçe.

Fenerbahçe already secured a berth in 2012–13 UEFA Champions League through league position. Because of this, Bursaspor will play in the second qualifying round of the 2012–13 UEFA Europa League.

Regardless of the European access, Fenerbahçe qualified for the 2012 Turkish Super Cup as cup winners.

== Final ==
16 May 2012
20:30 EEST (UTC+03)
Final

Bursaspor	0 – 4	Fenerbahçe
	Report (in Turkish)	C. Erkin 2'; Baroni 45'; S. Şentürk 58'; Alex 77'

Ankara 19 Mayıs Stadium
Attendance: 19,500
Referee: Bülent Yıldırım

Bursaspor	Fenerbahçe

Bursaspor:
GK	12	(England) Scott Carson
DF	20	(Morocco) Michaël Chrétien Basser	(yellow card) 53'
DF	38	(Turkey) İbrahim Öztürk (C)
DF	23	(Turkey) Serdar Aziz
DF	6	(Turkey) Gökçek Vederson
MF	7	(France) Alfred N'Diaye		(substituted off) 63'
MF	21	(Turkey) Adem Koçak		(substituted off) 56'
MF	10	(Argentina) Pablo Batalla
MF	33	(Turkey) Ozan İpek
FW	9	(Slovakia) Stanislav Šesták		(substituted off) 71'
FW	11	(Chile) Sebastián Pinto	(yellow card) 66'
Substitutes:
GK	1	(Turkey) Yavuz Özkan
DF	4	(Turkey) Ömer Erdoğan
MF	30	(Turkey) Musa Çağıran	(yellow card) 83'	(substituted on) 56'
MF	13	(Sweden) Gustav Svensson
MF	35	(Turkey) Hakan Aslantaş
FW	14	(Turkey) Okan Deniz		(substituted on) 71'
FW	22	(Turkey) Turgay Bahadır		(substituted on) 63'
Manager:
(Turkey) Ertuğrul Sağlam

Fenerbahçe:
GK	1	(Turkey) Volkan Demirel
DF	77	(Turkey) Gökhan Gönül		(substituted off) 58'
DF	4	(Turkey) Bekir İrtegün
DF	6	(Nigeria) Joseph Yobo		(substituted off) 31'
DF	3	(Switzerland) Reto Ziegler
MF	16	(Brazil) Cristian Baroni	45'	(yellow card) 45'
MF	5	(Turkey) Emre Belözoğlu	(yellow card) 73'
MF	38	(Turkey) Mehmet Topuz
MF	88	(Turkey) Caner Erkin	2'
MF	10	(Brazil) Alex de Souza (C)	78'	(substituted off) 81'
FW	23	(Turkey) Semih Şentürk	58'
Substitutes:
GK	34	(Turkey) Mert Günok
DF	53	(Turkey) Serdar Kesimal		(substituted on) 31'
DF	67	(Turkey) Orhan Şam		(substituted on) 58'
MF	62	(Turkey) Selçuk Şahin
MF	20	(Turkey) Özer Hurmacı
MF	9	(Slovakia) Miroslav Stoch
FW	7	(Senegal) Moussa Sow		(substituted on) 81'
Manager:
(Turkey) Aykut Kocaman

Assistant referees:
Cem Satman
Ekrem Kan
Fourth official:
Barış Şimşek

Match rules

- 90 minutes
- 30 minutes of extra time if necessary
- Penalty shoot-out if scores still level
- Seven named substitutes
- Maximum of three substitutions

Turkish Cup
2011–12 Winners
Fenerbahçe
5th Title

== See also ==
- 2011–12 Turkish Cup
- 2012 Turkish Super Cup
