= 2012 Turkish Super Cup =

2012 TFF Süper Kupa
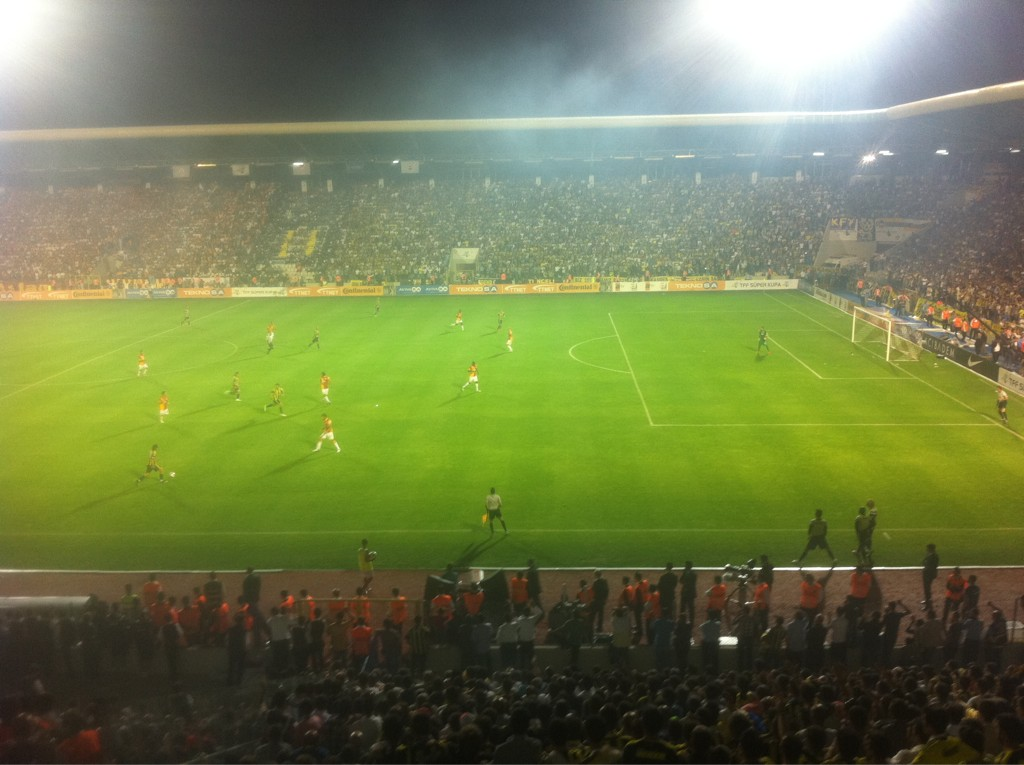
- Event: Turkish Super Cup
Galatasaray	Fenerbahçe
3	2
- Date: 12 August 2012
- Venue: Kazım Karabekir Stadium, Erzurum
- Man of the Match: Umut Bulut
- Referee: Cüneyt Çakır
- Attendance: 25,000
- Weather: Fine

2012 Turkish Super Cup (Turkish: TFF Süper Kupa) was the 39th edition of the Turkish Super Cup since its establishment as Presidential Cup in 1966. The match was contested between the 2011–12 Süper Lig champions Galatasaray and the 2011–12 Turkish Cup winners Fenerbahçe, making the game the 372nd edition of Kıtalar Arası Derbi. The game was the first to take place since 2010 Turkish Super Cup, as the 2011 Turkish Super Cup was cancelled because of the 2011 Turkish sports corruption scandal.

== Background ==
This was the 4th overall national super cup matchup between the teams since 1966, and the first matchup since 2006, when the cup was rebranded as TFF Süper Kupa. Galatasaray last won the cup in 2008 against Kayserispor, while Fenerbahçe last won the cup in 2009 against Beşiktaş. In their three previous finals, Fenerbahçe won two, in 1973 and 1985, while Galatasaray won in 1996.

== Path to the final ==
Galatasaray were champions in the regular season, finishing 9 points ahead of Fenerbahçe. In the championship playoffs, Fenerbahçe caught up with Galatasaray, but Galatasaray were crowned eventual champions, finishing 1 point ahead of Fenerbahçe. In the regular season, Galatasaray collected 77 points with 23 wins, 8 draws, and 3 losses. Fenerbahçe collected 68 points with 20 wins, 8 draws, and 6 losses. At the beginning of the championship playoffs, the regular season points were halved. Galatasaray finished collecting 48 points by 2 wins, 3 draws, and 1 loss. Fenerbahçe had a better run in the playoffs, by 4 wins, 1 draw, and 1 loss. But they only collected 47 points and Galatasaray became champions of 2011–12 Süper Lig, securing a berth in the Turkish Super Cup final.

Although runners-up of the league, Fenerbahçe performed better in the domestic cup. They entered the tournament at the third round. They won their third-round match against Konya Torku Şekerspor. In the fourth round, they beat Samsunspor. The quarter-final was the toughest match for Fenerbahçe, as they struggled against Kayserispor, but were winners after a penalty shoot-out. In the semi-finals stage, they played against Karabükspor. In the 2012 Turkish Cup Final they were crowned champions against rivals Bursaspor by a decisive 4–0 win, which was their first domestic cup win in 29 years, since 1983. By winning the cup, Fenerbahçe secured a berth in the Turkish Super Cup final.

== Match details ==
2012 Turkish Super Cup
12 August 2012
20:55 EEST (UTC+03)
Final

Galatasaray	3–2	Fenerbahçe
Bulut 19', 58'; İnan 90' (pen.)	Report (in Turkish)	Alex 45'; Kuyt 65'

Kazım Karabekir Stadium, Erzurum
Attendance: 25,000
Referee: Cüneyt Çakır

Galatasaray	Fenerbahçe

GK	25	(Uruguay) Fernando Muslera
DF	27	(Ivory Coast) Emmanuel Eboué
DF	13	(Cameroon) Dany Nounkeu	(yellow card) 68'
DF	26	(Turkey) Semih Kaya
DF	22	(Turkey) Hakan Balta (c)
MF	4	(Turkey) Hamit Altıntop
MF	50	(Turkey) Engin Baytar	(red card) 68'
MF	8	(Turkey) Selçuk İnan	(yellow card) 90+4'
MF	52	(Turkey) Emre Çolak	(yellow card) 31'	(substituted off) 83'
FW	19	(Turkey) Umut Bulut		(substituted off) 89'
FW	9	(Sweden) Johan Elmander		(substituted off) 69'
Substitutes:
GK	86	(Turkey) Ufuk Ceylan
DF	5	(Turkey) Gökhan Zan
DF	7	(Turkey) Aydin Yilmaz		(substituted on) 83'
MF	11	(Spain) Albert Riera
MF	35	(Turkey) Yekta Kurtuluş
MF	53	(Morocco) Nordin Amrabat		(substituted on) 69'
FW	77	(Turkey) Necati Ateș		(substituted on) 65'
Manager:
(Turkey) Fatih Terim Assistant referees: Bahattın Duran; Tarik Ongun; Fourth official: Süleyman Abay

GK	1	(Turkey) Volkan Demirel		(substituted off) 16'
DF	67	(Turkey) Orhan Sam	(yellow card) 70'	(substituted off) 89'
DF	2	(Turkey) Egemen Korkmaz
DF	4	(Turkey) Bekir Irtegün	(yellow card) 76'
DF	3	(Turkey) Hasan Ali Kaldırım
DF	5	(Turkey) Mehmet Topal		(substituted off) 69'
MF	16	(Brazil) Cristian
MF	38	(Turkey) Mehmet Topuz	(yellow card) 75'
MF	10	(Brazil) Alex (c)	(yellow card) 44'
MF	88	(Turkey) Caner Erkin
FW	11	(Netherlands) Dirk Kuyt
Substitutes:
GK	24	(Turkey) Mert Günok		(substituted on) 16'
DF	7	(Senegal) Moussa Sow		(substituted on) 89'
DF	9	(Slovakia) Miroslav Stoch
MF	17	(Turkey) Recep Niyaz
MF	21	(Turkey) Selçuk Sahin
MF	23	(Turkey) Semih Sentürk
MF	27	(Serbia) Milos Krasić		(substituted on) 69'
Manager:
(Turkey) Aykut Kocaman

== See also ==
- 2011–12 Süper Lig
- 2011–12 Turkish Cup
