= Yerlikaya =

Yerlikaya is a Turkish surname formed by the combination of the Turkish words yerli ("local; native") and kaya ("rock") and may refer to:

- Ali Yerlikaya (born 1968), Turkish former provincial governor, current Minister of the Interior
- Hamza Yerlikaya (born 1976), Turkish sport wrestler
- Hayrettin Yerlikaya (born 1981), Turkish footballer
