= Semih Şentürk =

Turkish footballer

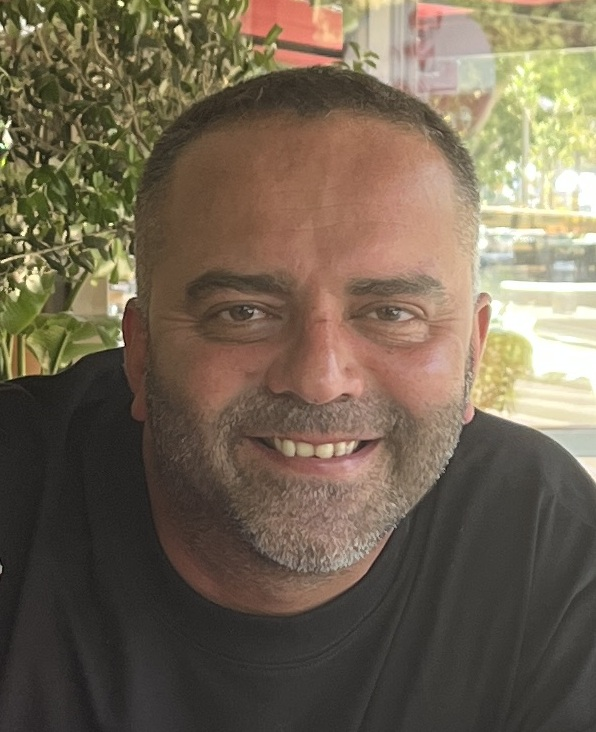
- Şentürk in 2023

Personal information
- Date of birth: 29 April 1983 (age 43)
- Place of birth: İzmir, Turkey
- Height: 1.82 m (6 ft 0 in)
- Position: Striker

Youth career
- 1993–1999: Özçamdibispor
- 1999–2002: Fenerbahçe A2

Senior career*
Years	Team	Apps	(Gls)
2001–2013	Fenerbahçe	205	(56)
2001–2002	→ İzmirspor (loan)	22	(3)
2014	Antalyaspor	13	(3)
2014–2016	İstanbul Başakşehir	31	(11)
2016–2018	Eskişehirspor	47	(18)
Total		318	(91)

International career
1999	Turkey U15	4	(1)
1999-2000	Turkey U16	27	(15)
2000-2001	Turkey U17	18	(1)
2000-2001	Turkey U18	4	(0)
2001	Turkey U19	4	(4)
2002-2003	Turkey U20	6	(2)
2003-2005	Turkey U21	21	(6)
2006	Turkey B	1	(0)
2007-2012	Turkey	28	(8)

Managerial career
- 2020–2024: Fenerbahçe (youth coach)
Medal record
Representing Turkey
Men's football
UEFA European Championship
Bronze medal – third place	2008 Austria & Switzerland
- * Club domestic league appearances and goals

Semih Şentürk (born 29 April 1983) is a Turkish former international footballer who played as a striker.

He has spent most of his club career at Fenerbahçe where he played between 1999 and 2014, winning 5 Süper Lig and 2 Turkish Cup titles, having risen through the ranks of the Fenerbahçe youth section. Şentürk was a part of Turkey at UEFA Euro 2008, in which Turkey reaches semi-finals. Şentürk was the top-scorer of Süper Lig in 2007–08 season with 17 goals. He has been named as 'Nöbetçi Golcü (Striker on Duty)' by media and fans for his super-sub status in Fenerbahçe and Turkish national team.

== Club career ==
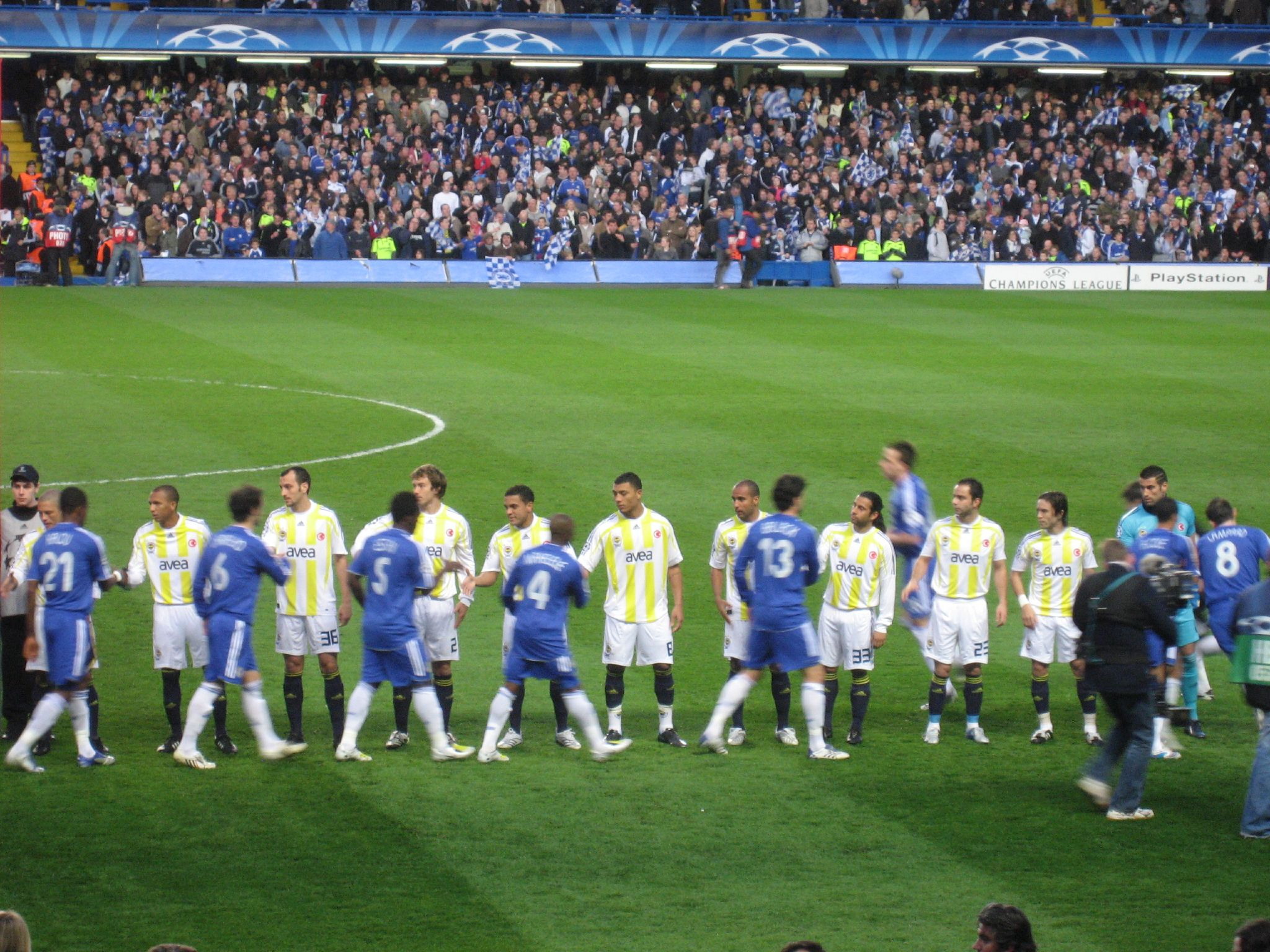
Şentürk among the Fenerbahçe line-up against Chelsea

Şentürk started his career at Özçamdibispor, a local club in İzmir in 1993. He joined Fenerbahçe in 1999. Şentürk cemented his place in the team during the 2007–08 Süper Lig season, in which he scored 17 goals and finished the season as league top scorer. His more prominent role in the team was rewarded after he was named as the vice-captain of the team in 2007 after the departure of the former captains Ümit Özat and Tuncay. His four goals against MTK Budapest on 6 August 2008 meant that Semih became only the second Turkish player after Fethi Heper to score four goals in a single European match. In 2008, he signed his first extension contract keeping him at the club until May 2010. In 2011, he signed another contract extension which will keep him at the club until 2014.

On 19 June 2013 Şentürk left Fenerbahçe. On 26 January 2014, Semih scored his first goal for his new team Antalyaspor. Later on, he played for İstanbul Başakşehir and Eskişehirspor.

== International career ==
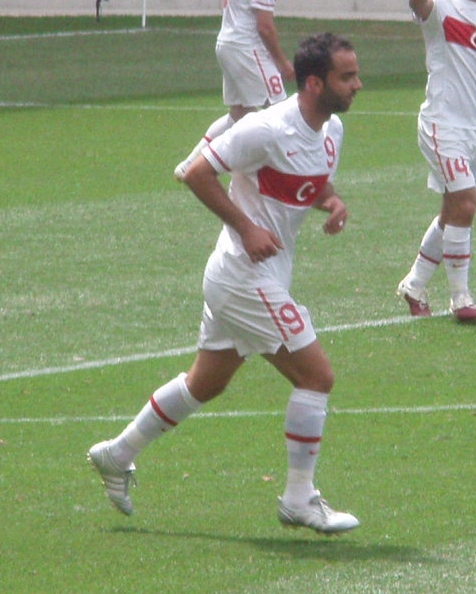
Semih Şentürk playing for Turkey in 2010

Şentürk was included to Turkey by Fatih Terim. On 11 June he came on as a substitute in the 46th minute and in the 57th minute of the second Group A encounter against Switzerland and scored the equalizer with a powerful header outjumping Swiss defence and beating the goalkeeper, even though he got a hand on it. In the quarter-finals match versus Croatia, Şentürk scored a last-second equalizer, leading team to beat Croatia through the penalty shootouts.

In Euro 2008 semi-final against Germany turned out to have a thriller ending in which Şentürk played a key role. In the 86th minute, just 7 minutes after Miroslav Klose's goal, Şentürk took a low cross provided by teammate Sabri Sarıoğlu and steered in the crucial equalizer. However, his side went on to be defeated as Germany's winger-back Philipp Lahm managed to score a decisive goal in the 90th minute, which knocked out Turkey eventually. Upon the end of the competition, Şentürk received many plaudits for his last minute heroics, with the press labeling him as the super-sub of the tournament.

== Coaching career ==
In November 2020 Fenerbahçe confirmed the return of Şentürk, who returned to the club as a academy coach. In July 2023, after several different positions in the club's academy, Şentürk was promoted to head coach of the club's U-19 team. On 18 September 2024, he announced his resignation from this position.

== Career statistics ==
=== Club ===
Appearances and goals by club, season and competition
Club	Season	League			Cup (Note: Includes Turkish Cup, Turkish Super Cup.)		Europe (Note: Includes UEFA Champions League, UEFA Europa League.)		Total	
Club	Season	Division	Apps	Goals	Apps	Goals	Apps	Goals	Apps	Goals
Fenerbahçe	2000–01	Süper Lig	1	0	0	0	—		1	0
Fenerbahçe	2002–03	Süper Lig	13	3	1	0	—		14	3
Fenerbahçe	2003–04	Süper Lig	13	1	1	1	—		14	2
Fenerbahçe	2004–05	Süper Lig	3	0	1	0	—		4	0
Fenerbahçe	2005–06	Süper Lig	22	9	5	4	1	0	28	13
Fenerbahçe	2006–07	Süper Lig	18	1	7	7	7	2	32	10
Fenerbahçe	2007–08	Süper Lig	27	17	3	0	8	2	38	19
Fenerbahçe	2008–09	Süper Lig	24	7	5	1	6	6	35	14
Fenerbahçe	2009–10	Süper Lig	21	6	2	1	6	0	29	7
Fenerbahçe	2010–11	Süper Lig	25	10	4	4	2	0	31	14
Fenerbahçe	2011–12	Süper Lig	22	1	3	2	—		25	3
Fenerbahçe	2012–13	Süper Lig	17	1	8	3	2	0	27	4
Fenerbahçe	2013–14	Süper Lig	0	0	0	0	0	0	0	0
Total			205	56	40	23	34	10	277	89
Antalyaspor	2013–14	Süper Lig	13	3	5	2	—		18	5
İstanbul Başakşehir	2014–15	Süper Lig	23	11	1	0	—		24	11
İstanbul Başakşehir	2015–16	Süper Lig	7	0	9	6	—		16	6
İstanbul Başakşehir	Total		30	11	10	6	—		40	17
Career total			248	70	55	31	32	9	335	111

=== International ===
Appearances and goals by national team and year
National team	Year	Apps	Goals
Turkey	2007	2	0
Turkey	2008	6	5
Turkey	2009	7	1
Turkey	2010	10	2
Turkey	2011	3	0
Total		28	8

Scores and results list Turkey's goal tally first, score column indicates score after each Şentürk goal.

List of international goals scored by Semih Şentürk
No.	Date	Venue	Opponent	Score	Result	Competition
1	29 May 2008	MSV-Arena, Duisburg, Germany	Finland	2–0	2–0	Friendly
2	11 June 2008	St. Jakob-Park, Basel, Switzerland	Switzerland	1–1	2–1	UEFA Euro 2008
3	20 June 2008	Ernst Happel Stadion, Wien, Austria	Croatia	1–1	1–1	UEFA Euro 2008
4	25 June 2008	St. Jakob-Park, Basel, Switzerland	Germany	2–2	2–3	UEFA Euro 2008
5	6 September 2008	Hrazdan Stadium, Yerevan, Armenia	Armenia	2–0	2–0	2010 FIFA World Cup qualification
6	1 April 2009	Ali Sami Yen Stadium, Istanbul, Turkey	Spain	1–0	1–2	2010 FIFA World Cup qualification
7	26 May 2010	Veterans Stadium, New Britain, United States	Northern Ireland	2–0	2–0	Friendly
8	7 September 2010	Şükrü Saracoğlu Stadium, Istanbul, Turkey	Belgium	2–1	3–2	UEFA Euro 2012 qualifying

== Honours ==
Fenerbahçe

- Süper Lig: 2000–01, 2003–04, 2004–05, 2006–07, 2010–11
- Türkiye Kupası: 2011–12, 2012–13
- Süper Kupa: 2007, 2009

Türkiye

- UEFA European Championship bronze medalist: 2008
