= Reha Erginer =

Turkish footballer

Personal information
- Full name: Reha Kemal Erginer
- Date of birth: 1 January 1970 (age 56)
- Place of birth: Manisa, Turkey
- Position: Midfielder

Team information
- Current team: Boluspor (manager)

Managerial career
- Years: Team
- 2002–2003: Kayseri Erciyesspor (assistant)
- 2003–2004: B.B. Ankaraspor (assistant)
- 2004–2009: MKE Ankaragücü (assistant)
- 2010–2011: Manisaspor (assistant)
- 2012–2013: Manisaspor
- 2014–2015: Boluspor
- 2016: Balıkesirspor
- 2017–2018: Denizlispor
- 2020–: Boluspor

Reha Erginer (born 1 January 1970) is a Turkish football coach and former player who is the manager of Boluspor.
