= Uğur Kavuk =

Turkish footballer

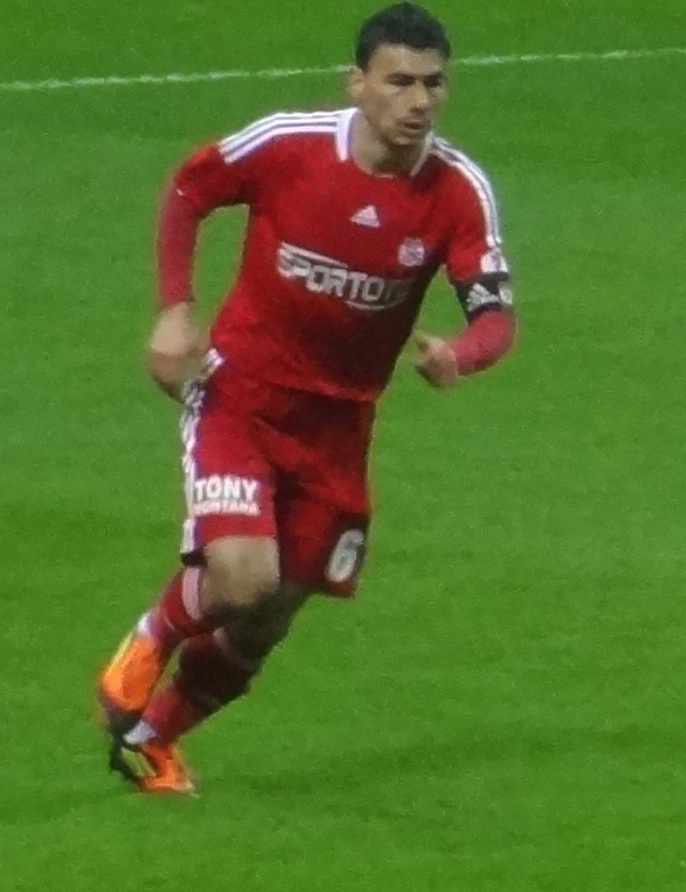

Personal information
- Date of birth: September 11, 1979 (age 47)
- Place of birth: Zonguldak, Turkey
- Height: 1.78 m (5 ft 10 in)
- Position: Fullback

Youth career
- 1997: Kilimli Belediyespor

Senior career*
Years	Team	Apps	(Gls)
1998–2000	Kilimli Belediyespor		
1998–1999	→ Karadeniz Ereglispor (loan)		
2001–2003	Zonguldakspor	30	(9)
2001–2002	→ Kilimli Belediyespor (loan)		
2003–2006	Istanbul B.B.	89	(5)
2006–2009	Antalyaspor	91	(4)
2009–2013	Sivasspor	91	(0)
2013	Gaziantepspor	2	(0)
2014–2015	İnegölspor	33	(0)
2015–2016	Ödemişspor	8	(2)
- * Club domestic league appearances and goals

Uğur Kavuk (born September 11, 1979 in Zonguldak, Turkey) is a Turkish footballer who last played as a fullback for Ödemişspor.
