= Alex (footballer, born 1977) =

Brazilian footballer

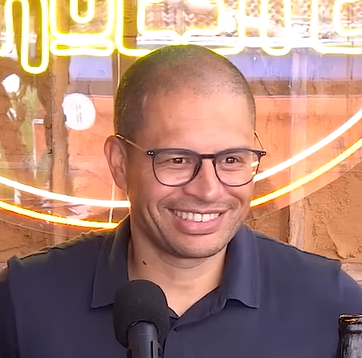
- Alex in 2025

Personal information
- Full name: Alexsandro de Souza
- Date of birth: 14 September 1977 (age 49)
- Place of birth: Curitiba, Paraná, Brazil
- Height: 1.75 m (5 ft 9 in)
- Position: Attacking midfielder

Team information
- Current team: Athletic-MG (head coach)

Senior career*
| Years | Team | Apps | (Gls) |
| 1995–1997 | Coritiba | 147 | (44) |
| 1997–2000 | Palmeiras | 184 | (55) |
| 2000–2002 | Parma | 0 | (0) |
| 2000 | → Flamengo (loan) | 12 | (3) |
| 2001 | → Palmeiras (loan) | 30 | (13) |
| 2001 | → Cruzeiro (loan) | 19 | (4) |
| 2002 | → Palmeiras (loan) | 15 | (5) |
| 2002–2004 | Cruzeiro | 104 | (59) |
| 2004–2012 | Fenerbahçe | 245 | (136) |
| 2013–2014 | Coritiba | 85 | (38) |
| Total | | 496 | (218) |

International career
| 1999–2000 | Brazil U20 | 15 | (3) |
| 1998–2005 | Brazil | 49 | (12) |

Managerial career
- 2021–2022: São Paulo U20
- 2023: Avaí
- 2024–2025: Antalyaspor
- 2025–2026: Operário Ferroviário
- 2026–: Athletic-MG
Medal record
Representing Brazil
Men's football
Copa América
| Winner | 1999 Paraguay |
| Winner | 2004 Peru |
FIFA Confederations Cup
| Runner-up | 1999 Mexico |
- * Club domestic league appearances and goals

Alexsandro de Souza (born 14 September 1977), commonly known as Alex de Souza or just Alex, is a Brazilian football coach and former player who played as an attacking midfielder. He is the current head coach of Athletic-MG.

Alex is best known for his time at Fenerbahçe, where he was a long-time captain and became the highest-scoring foreign player of all time in the Süper Lig. Throughout his career, he also played for Coritiba, Palmeiras, Flamengo and Cruzeiro in Brazil, as well as Parma in the Italian Serie A.

Internationally, Alex earned 48 caps and scored 12 goals for Brazil from 1998 to 2005. He was part of their squads at three Copa América tournaments, winning in 1999 and 2004, the latter as captain. He additionally went to the 2000 Olympics and two FIFA Confederations Cups, but never was chosen for the FIFA World Cup.

When he retired, he was near to 1,000 career appearances.

== Club career ==
=== Early years ===
Born in Curitiba, Alex first played professionally for his hometown club Coritiba, where he stayed from 1995 until 97, when he was sold to Palmeiras, from São Paulo. He won the Parque Antárctica club a Libertadores da América cup title, in 1999, a Rio-São Paulo cup title in 2000 and a Copa do Brasil title and a Mercosul cup title in 1998. He left Palmeiras and signed with Flamengo, of Rio de Janeiro in 2000.

In 2000, he returned to Palmeiras for a few months and then signed with Cruzeiro, where he stayed until 2002, when he returned to Palmeiras. Alex was sold to Parma of Italy. He returned to Cruzeiro, after playing only friendly matches for the Italian team. Made team captain and wearing jersey number 10, he led his team to winning the Brazilian triple crown (that is the State Championship, the Brasileirão and the Brazilian Cup). Cruzeiro won the Brasileirão with a record-breaking 100 points, 13 ahead of the second place, Santos, with more than 100 goals scored in 46 games.

=== Fenerbahçe ===
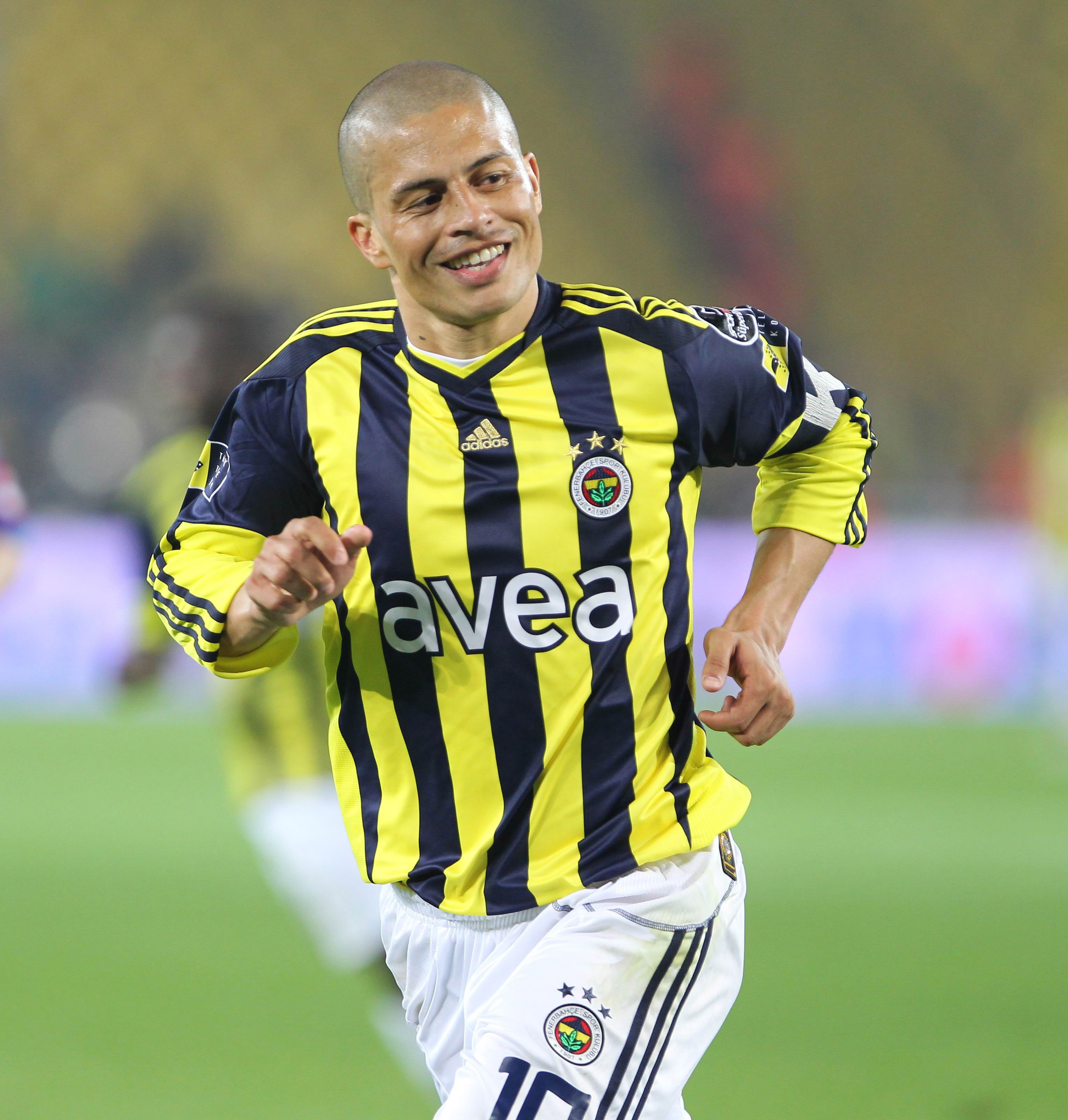
Alex playing for Fenerbahçe in 2011

Alex was then sold by Cruzeiro in 2004 for €5 million to Fenerbahçe. He became Fenerbahçe captain after the team's captain Ümit Özat's transfer to 1. FC Köln and vice-captains Tuncay's transfer to Middlesbrough and Rüştü Reçber's transfer to rival Beşiktaş. Alex scored his 100th goal in the Süper Lig for Fenerbahçe on 13 November 2010 against Gaziantepspor when they lost 2–1. At 33 years of age Alex scored a hat-trick against Bucaspor in the first 35 minutes of the game. Fenerbahçe won the match 5–2. His first goal in this game was Fenerbahçe's 3000th goal in the Süper Lig, so his kit and shoes used in the Bucaspor match are now shown in the club's museum. On 9 February 2011, he signed another two-year contract with Fenerbahçe.

On 15 May 2011, he scored five goals, including three penalties and a free-kick, in a 6–0 win against Ankaragücü.

After Fenerbahçe's league title for the year 2010–11, Alex won the golden boot award with 28 goals for the season, nine more than second place Burak Yılmaz. He made his 900th career appearance on 12 September 2011 in the opening match of the Super Lig season, a 1–0 victory against Orduspor. In the 2012 Turkish Cup final on 16 May 2012 against Bursaspor, Alex netted Fenerbahçe's fourth and final goal of a 4–0 victory and was named the game's "Man of the Match".

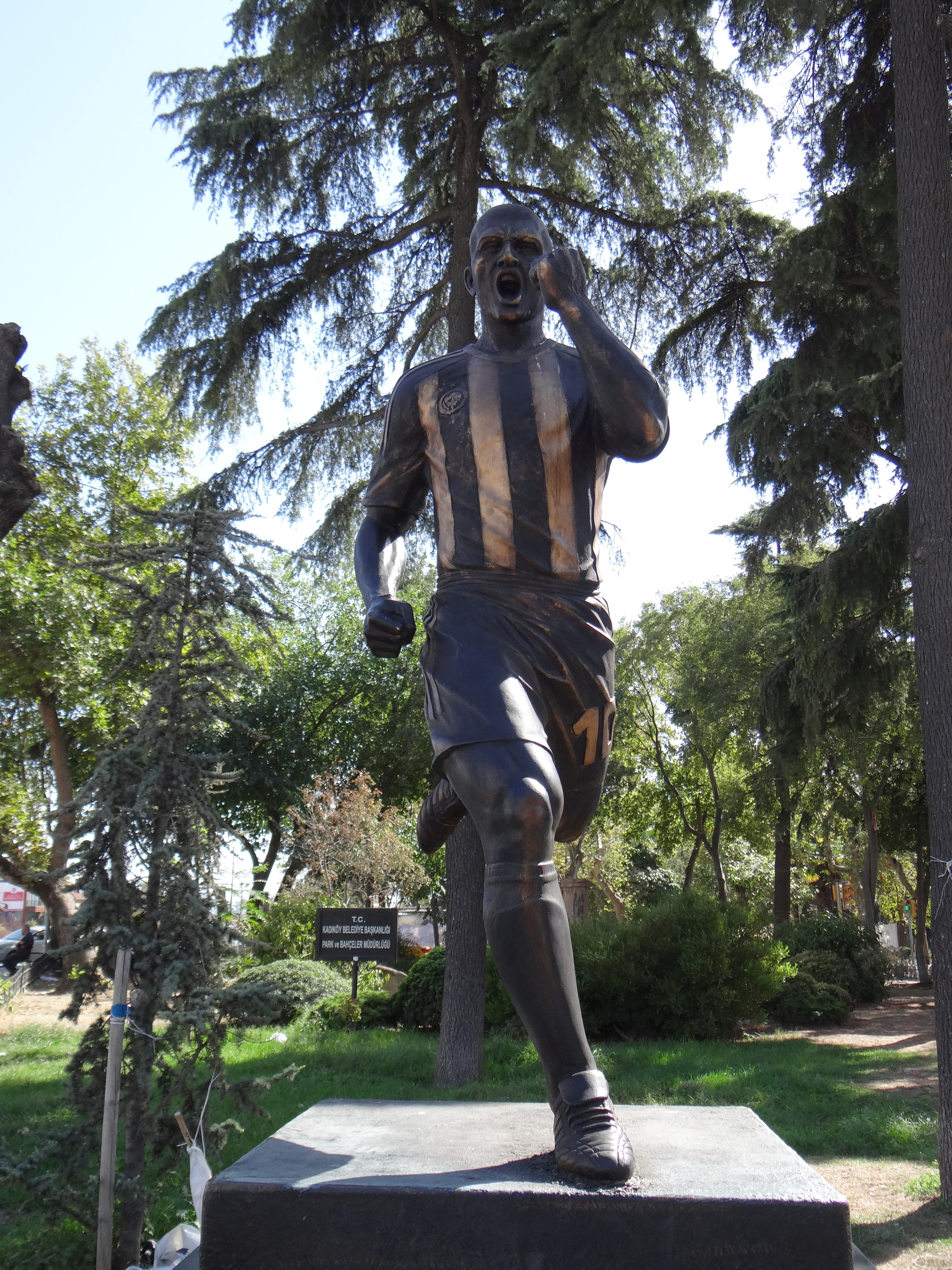
Statue of Alex at Kadıköy Yoğurtçu Park

On 15 September 2012, while Alex was still under contract with Fenerbahçe, a fan-funded statue of the player was unveiled in Kadıköy Yoğurtçu park. Alex's last goal for Fenerbahçe came on 20 September in the Europa League, scoring Fenerbahçe's second goal in a 2–2 draw with Marseille. Alex's last appearance for the club came on 29 September, playing the first half of a 2–0 defeat to Kasımpaşa in the 2012–13 Süper Lig. After a rift with coach Aykut Kocaman over the team's system, his contract with Fenerbahçe was terminated on 1 October. With Fenerbahçe he has concluded his impressive career in Turkey with 136 assists and 171 goals in 341 games. He left just five goals shy of matching the club record for league goals with 136 goals, held by former striker Aykut Kocaman. He scored Fenerbahçe's 3000th goal.

=== Coritiba ===
After he rarely featured for Fenerbahçe throughout the early part of the 2012–13 campaign, managing just five league appearances through October, Alex joined Brazilian side Coritiba on 18 October 2012 for an undisclosed fee. He made his debut for his boyhood club on 31 January 2013, playing the entirety of a 1–0 defeat of J. Malucelli in the Campeonato Paranaense. His first goal for his new club came on 9 February in a 1–1 draw with Arapongas, scoring the equalizing goal three minutes after Wellington Índio's opener in the 47th minute. Alex scored the solitary goal of the game against Londrina on 3 March, starting a run of nine straight matches where the player scored, netting 12 goals. Included in this goal-scoring run was a brace in a 6–0 defeat of Rio Branco on 13 April. Alex finished the Campeonato Paranaense campaign by scoring a brace in Coritiba's 3–1 defeat of Atlético Paranaense on 12 May, securing a 5–3 aggregate win in the final as Coritiba claimed a record 37th state title. In October 2014, Alex announced his retirement from football. His last game was a 3–2 win against Bahia, on 7 December 2014.

== International career ==
Alex made his senior international debut for Brazil on 23 September 1998 in a 1–1 friendly draw with FR Yugoslavia in São Luís, Maranhão, as an 82nd-minute substitute for Denílson in Brazil's first match since defeat in the 1998 FIFA World Cup. He scored his first goal in his third appearance, opening a 3–0 win over Latvia in his hometown the following 26 June.

At the 1999 Copa América in Paraguay, Alex scored the decisive goal in a 2–1 group win over Mexico with a 25-yard strike. Brazil won the tournament under manager Vanderlei Luxemburgo, with Alex and Ronaldinho being young replacements for Edílson and Leonardo who were dropped for disciplinary reasons. Days later at the 1999 FIFA Confederations Cup in Mexico, he scored twice in a 4–0 opening win over Germany and twice again in an 8–2 semi-final rout of Saudi Arabia, though his team lost the final to the hosts.

Alex also went with the Brazilian Olympic team to the 2000 tournament in Australia, concluding a 3–1 opening win over Slovakia and scoring the only goal of a group win against Japan; quarter-final defeat to Cameroon led to Luxemburgo's resignation. At the 2001 Copa América in Colombia, Alex equalised in a 3–1 group win over Paraguay as the team were again eliminated in a quarter-final shock, this time to Honduras. In qualification for the 2002 FIFA World Cup, he scored once to open a 3–1 home win over rivals Argentina. He was not chosen for the final tournament, which Brazil won under manager Luiz Felipe Scolari, and confessed in his autobiography that he drank heavily to distract himself from the event, while his wife miscarried upon hearing that Ricardinho had been called up as a replacement for the injured Emerson and not her husband.

Alex scored an added-time equaliser at the 2003 FIFA Confederations Cup in France as Brazil drew 2–2 with Turkey in their final group game in Saint-Étienne, but were eliminated nonetheless. Brazil won the 2004 Copa América in Peru, in which captain Alex scored in a 4–0 quarter-final win against Mexico; he was then overlooked for the 2006 FIFA World Cup as well.

== Style of play ==
A talented and creative playmaker, with an eye for goal, Alex usually played in a free role as an attacking midfielder. Although he lacked significant pace and physical power, and was not particularly hard-working defensively, he was known for his passing, technical skills, control, low centre of gravity, vision, reading of the game, and ability to provide many assists for his teammates, in addition to being capable of scoring himself, in particular from set pieces. In addition to his usual role as a number ten, he was also deployed as a second striker on occasion throughout his career, or even on the left flank.

== Coaching career ==
On 5 April 2021, after a period working as a pundit, Alex joined São Paulo after being appointed the head coach of the under-20 team. On 28 October 2022, he left the club.

On 16 November 2022, Alex was appointed head coach of Avaí, freshly relegated from the top tier. He was dismissed the following 3 May.

On 18 May 2024, Alex was appointed head coach of Antalyaspor. On 13 January 2025, he mutually agreed with the club to part ways.

On 16 June 2025, Alex was appointed as head coach of Operário Ferroviário in the second division, replacing Bruno Pivetti. He was sacked the following 18 January, after three losses in four matches into the new season.

On 21 February 2026, Alex took over Athletic-MG also in division two.

== Personal life ==
Alex married Daianne in 2000. The couple have two daughters and one son: Maria Eduarda, born in 2004, Antonia, born in 2006, and Felipe, born in 2010. He features prominently in Puma advertising and also has a modeling contract with Armani. Alex's father-in-law is the former president of Coritiba. After his retirement, Alex started to work on ESPN Brasil as a pundit and presenter for interview show Papo Cabeça.

== Career statistics ==
=== Club ===
Appearances and goals by club, season and competition
| Club | Season | League | | | National cup (Note: Includes Copa do Brasil, Turkish Cup) | | Continental | | Other | | Total | |
| Club | Season | Division | Apps | Goals | Apps | Goals | Apps | Goals | Apps | Goals | Apps | Goals |
|---|---|---|---|---|---|---|---|---|---|---|---|---|
| Coritiba | 1995 | Série B | 27 | 4 | 0 | 0 | – | | 25 (Note: Appearance(s) in Campeonato Paranaense) | 2 | 52 | 6 |
| Coritiba | 1996 | Série A | 18 | 5 | 2 | 0 | – | | 24 | 6 | 47 | 27 |
| Coritiba | 1997 | Série A | 2 | 2 | 4 | 2 | – | | 20 | 13 | 38 | 11 |
| Coritiba | 2013 | Série A | 29 | 12 | 1 | 0 | 1 (Note: Appearance(s) in Copa Sudamericana) | 0 | 12 | 14 | 47 | 27 |
| Coritiba | 2014 | Série A | 26 | 6 | 3 | 0 | – | | 8 | 4 | 38 | 11 |
| Coritiba | Total | | 102 | 29 | 10 | 2 | 1 | 0 | 89 | 39 | 202 | 70 |
| Palmeiras | 1997 | Série A | 28 | 7 | 0 | 0 | – | | 0 | 0 | 28 | 7 |
| Palmeiras | 1998 | Série A | 23 | 7 | 10 | 0 | 11 (Note: Appearance(s) in Copa Mercosur) | 6 | 21 (Note: Thirteen appearances and three goals in Campeonato Paulista, eight appearances and two goals in Torneio Rio–São Paulo) | 5 | 65 | 19 |
| Palmeiras | 1999 | Série A | 14 | 5 | 9 | 2 | 22 (Note: Seven appearances and three goals in Copa Mercosur, fourteen appearances and four goals in Copa Libertadores, one appearance in Intercontinental Cup) | 7 | 15 (Note: Twelve appearances and five goals in Campeonato Paulista, three appearances in Torneio Rio–São Paulo) | 5 | 60 | 19 |
| Palmeiras | 2000 | Série A | 0 | 0 | 0 | 0 | 13 (Note: Appearance(s) in Copa Libertadores) | 4 | 16 (Note: Eleven appearances and one goal in Campeonato Paulista, five appearances and four goals in Torneio Rio–São Paulo) | 5 | 31 | 10 |
| Palmeiras | Total | | 65 | 19 | 19 | 2 | 46 | 17 | 52 | 15 | 184 | 55 |
| Palmeiras (loan) | 2001 | Série A | 0 | 0 | 0 | 0 | 12 | 4 | 18 (Note: Fourteen appearances and eight goals in Campeonato Paulista, four appearances and one goal in Torneio Rio–São Paulo) | 9 | 30 | 13 |
| Palmeiras (loan) | 2002 | Série A | 0 | 0 | 2 | 0 | – | | 13 (Note: Appearance(s) in Torneio Rio–São Paulo) | 5 | 15 | 5 |
| Palmeiras (loan) | Total | | 0 | 0 | 2 | 0 | 12 | 4 | 31 | 14 | 45 | 18 |
| Flamengo (loan) | 2000 | Série A | 10 | 3 | 0 | 0 | 2 | 0 | 0 | 0 | 12 | 3 |
| Cruzeiro (loan) | 2001 | Série A | 18 | 4 | 0 | 0 | – | | 1 (Note: Appearance in Copa dos Campeões) | 0 | 19 | 4 |
| Cruzeiro | 2002 | Série A | 13 | 2 | 0 | 0 | – | | 0 | 0 | 13 | 2 |
| Cruzeiro | 2003 | Série A | 38 | 23 | 11 | 6 | 1 | 0 | 12 (Note: Appearance(s) in Campeonato Mineiro) | 9 | 62 | 38 |
| Cruzeiro | 2004 | Série A | 5 | 2 | 0 | 0 | 7 | 3 | 17 | 14 | 29 | 19 |
| Cruzeiro | Total | | 56 | 27 | 11 | 6 | 8 | 3 | 29 | 19 | 104 | 59 |
| Fenerbahçe | 2004–05 | Süper Lig | 31 | 24 | 5 | 3 | 8 (Note: Six appearances in UEFA Champions League, two appearances and one goal in UEFA Cup) | 1 | – | | 44 | 29 |
| Fenerbahçe | 2005–06 | Süper Lig | 31 | 15 | 8 | 2 | 4 (Note: Appearances in UEFA Champions League) | 3 | – | | 43 | 20 |
| Fenerbahçe | 2006–07 | Süper Lig | 32 | 19 | 3 | 0 | 12 (Note: Four appearances in UEFA Champions League, eight appearances and one goal in UEFA Cup) | 1 | – | | 47 | 20 |
| Fenerbahçe | 2007–08 | Süper Lig | 28 | 14 | 2 | 0 | 12 | 4 | 1 (Note: Appearance in Turkish Super Cup) | 0 | 43 | 18 |
| Fenerbahçe | 2008–09 | Süper Lig | 26 | 11 | 5 | 4 | 9 | 2 | – | | 40 | 17 |
| Fenerbahçe | 2009–10 | Süper Lig | 26 | 11 | 8 | 5 | 8 (Note: Appearances in UEFA Europa League) | 3 | 1 | 2 | 43 | 21 |
| Fenerbahçe | 2010–11 | Süper Lig | 33 | 28 | 1 | 0 | 4 (Note: Two appearances in UEFA Champions League, two appearances in UEFA Europa League) | 0 | – | | 38 | 28 |
| Fenerbahçe | 2011–12 | Süper Lig | 33 | 14 | 3 | 3 | – | | – | | 36 | 17 |
| Fenerbahçe | 2012–13 | Süper Lig | 5 | 0 | 0 | 0 | 4 (Note: Three appearances in UEFA Champions League, one appearance and one goal in UEFA Europa League) | 1 | 1 | 1 | 10 | 2 |
| Fenerbahçe | Total | | 245 | 136 | 35 | 17 | 61 | 15 | 3 | 3 | 344 | 171 |
| Career total | | | 496 | 218 | 77 | 27 | 130 | 39 | 205 | 90 | 910 | 380 |

=== International ===
Appearances and goals by national team and year
| National team | Year | Apps | Goals |
|---|---|---|---|
| Brazil | 1998 | 2 | 0 |
| Brazil | 1999 | 11 | 6 |
| Brazil | 2000 | 7 | 1 |
| Brazil | 2001 | 5 | 2 |
| Brazil | 2002 | 1 | 0 |
| Brazil | 2003 | 6 | 1 |
| Brazil | 2004 | 13 | 1 |
| Brazil | 2005 | 3 | 1 |
| Brazil | Total | 48 | 12 |

Scores and results list Brazil's goal tally first, score column indicates score after each Alex goal.

List of international goals scored by Alex
| No. | Date | Venue | Opponent | Score | Result | Competition | Ref. |
|---|---|---|---|---|---|---|---|
| 1 | 26 June 1999 | Arena da Baixada, Curitiba, Brazil | Latvia | 1–0 | 3–0 | Friendly | |
| 2 | 3 July 1999 | Estadio Antonio Aranda, Ciudad del Este, Paraguay | Mexico | 2–0 | 2–1 | 1999 Copa América | |
| 3 | 24 July 1999 | Estadio Jalisco, Guadalajara, Mexico | Germany | 3–0 | 4–0 | 1999 FIFA Confederations Cup | |
| 4 | 24 July 1999 | Estadio Jalisco, Guadalajara, Mexico | Germany | 4–0 | 4–0 | 1999 FIFA Confederations Cup | |
| 5 | 1 August 1999 | Estadio Jalisco, Guadalajara, Mexico | Saudi Arabia | 4–2 | 8–2 | 1999 FIFA Confederations Cup | |
| 6 | 1 August 1999 | Estadio Jalisco, Guadalajara, Mexico | Saudi Arabia | 7–2 | 8–2 | 1999 FIFA Confederations Cup | |
| 7 | 26 July 2000 | Estádio do Morumbi, São Paulo, Brazil | Argentina | 1–0 | 3–1 | 2002 FIFA World Cup qualification | |
| 8 | 18 July 2001 | Estadio Olímpico Pascual Guerrero, Cali, Colombia | Paraguay | 1–1 | 3–1 | 2001 Copa América | |
| 9 | 9 August 2001 | Arena da Baixada, Curitiba, Brazil | Panama | 2–0 | 5–0 | Friendly | |
| 10 | 23 June 2003 | Stade Geoffroy-Guichard, Saint-Étienne, France | Turkey | 2–2 | 2–2 | 2003 FIFA Confederations Cup | |
| 11 | 18 July 2004 | Estadio Miguel Grau, Piura, Peru | Mexico | 1–0 | 4–0 | 2004 Copa América | |
| 12 | 9 February 2005 | Hong Kong Stadium, Causeway Bay, Hong Kong | Hong Kong | 7–0 | 7–1 | Friendly | |

=== Manager ===
As of 12 January 2025

Managerial record by team and tenure
| Team | Nat. | From | To | Record | | | | | | | | Ref. |
| Team | Nat. | From | To | G | W | D | L | GF | GA | GD | Win % | Ref. |
|---|---|---|---|---|---|---|---|---|---|---|---|---|
| Avaí | (Brazil) | 16 November 2022 | 3 May 2023 | 18 | 6 | 4 | 8 | 22 | 25 | −3 | 33.33 | |
| Antalyaspor | (Turkey) | 18 May 2024 | 13 January 2025 | 21 | 8 | 4 | 9 | 29 | 40 | −11 | 38.10 | |
| Total | | | | 39 | 14 | 8 | 17 | 51 | 65 | −14 | 35.90 | — |

== Honours ==
Palmeiras

- Copa do Brasil: 1998
- Copa Mercosur: 1998
- Copa Libertadores: 1999
- Torneio Rio-São Paulo: 2000
- Copa dos Campeões: 2000

Flamengo

- Campeonato Carioca: 2000
- Taça Rio: 2000

Cruzeiro

- Campeonato Brasileiro Série A: 2003
- Copa do Brasil: 2003
- Campeonato Mineiro: 2003, 2004
- Copa Sul-Minas: 2001, 2002

Fenerbahçe

- Süper Lig: 2004–05, 2006–07, 2010–11
- Turkish Cup: 2011–12
- Turkish Super Cup: 2007, 2009

Coritiba

- Campeonato Paranaense: 2013

Brazil U20

- South American Youth Championship: 1992, 1995

Brazil U23

- CONMEBOL Pre-Olympic Tournament: 2000

Brazil

- Copa América: 1999, 2004

Individual

- Campeonato Paranaense Revelation: 1995
- Campeonato Paranaense Best Player: 1996
- Campeonato Paranaense Best Midfielder: 1997
- Copa Mercosur Best Player: 1998
- IFFHS World's Top Goal Scorer: 1999 (3rd place)
- South American Team of The Year: 1999, 2003
- Troféu Telê Santana Best Midfielder: 2002
- Troféu Telê Santana Star of the Year: 2003
- Bola de Ouro: 2003
- Bola de Prata: 2003
- Copa América Team of the Tournament: 2004
- Turkish Cup top scorer: 2004–05
- Footballer of the year in Turkey: 2005, 2010
- Süper Lig Gol Kralı: 2006–07 (19 goals), 2010–11 (28 goals)
- UEFA Champions League top assist provider: 2007–08 (6 assists)
- Turkish Cup Best Player: 2011–12

== Orders ==
Chevalier in the Order of Rio Branco

== See also ==
- List of Fenerbahçe S.K. footballers
- List of foreign Süper Lig players
