= Okan Salmaz =

Turkish professional footballer (born 1992)

Personal information
- Full name: Okan Salmaz
- Date of birth: 17 July 1992 (age 34)
- Place of birth: Tufanbeyli, Adana, Turkey
- Height: 1.74 m (5 ft 9 in)
- Position: Winger

Team information
- Current team: Ceyhanspor

Youth career
- 2006–2007: Adana Sarıçam Burukspor
- 2007–2008: Adanaspor

Senior career*
Years	Team	Apps	(Gls)
2008–2014	Adanaspor	61	(6)
2013	→ Eyüpspor (loan)	9	(0)
2014	→ Bayrampaşaspor (loan)	10	(0)
2014–2015	Gölbaşıspor	18	(4)
2015–2016	Tuzlaspor	1	(0)
2016	Anadolu Selçukspor	6	(0)
2016	Üsküdar Anadolu	8	(0)
2017	Kütahyaspor	8	(0)
2017–2018	Kahramanmaraşspor	5	(1)
2018	Niğde Belediyespor	1	(0)
2018–2019	Ankara Demirspor	4	(0)
2019–2020	Erzinspor	27	(6)
2020–	Ceyhanspor	0	(0)

International career
2008	Turkey U16	9	(1)
2008–2009	Turkey U17	7	(1)
2009–2010	Turkey U18	7	(0)
2012	Turkey U21	1	(0)
- * Club domestic league appearances and goals as of 8 March 2020

Okan Salmaz (born 17 July 1992) is a Turkish professional footballer who plays as a winger for Ceyhanspor. Salmaz is also a youth international.
