= Pablo Batalla =

Argentine footballer

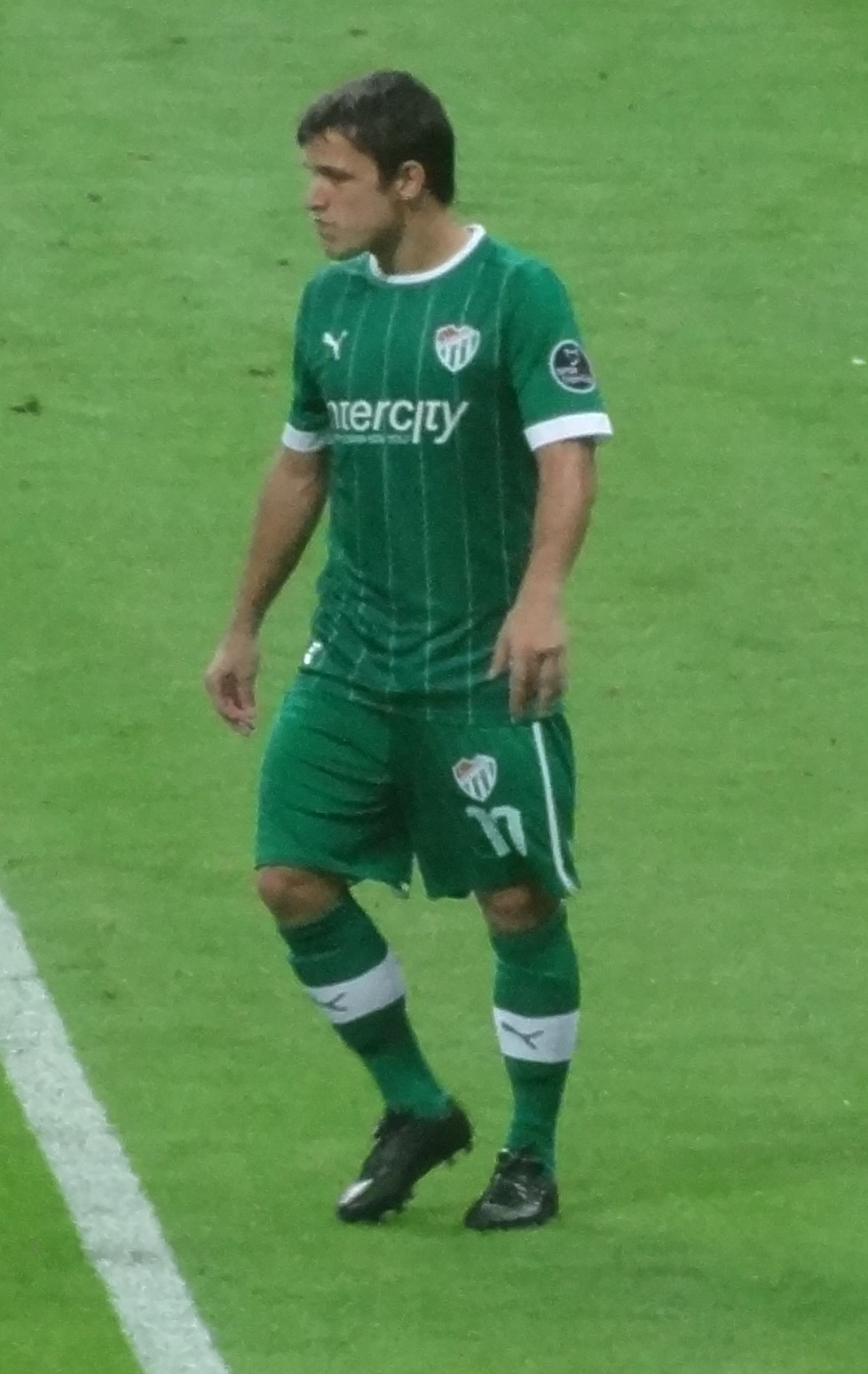

Personal information
- Full name: Pablo Martín Batalla
- Date of birth: 16 January 1984 (age 42)
- Place of birth: Córdoba, Argentina
- Height: 1.70 m (5 ft 7 in)
- Position: Midfielder

Youth career
- Deportivo Roca

Senior career*
Years	Team	Apps	(Gls)
2003–2005	Vélez Sársfield	41	(1)
2005	Pachuca	10	(0)
2006	Vélez Sársfield	8	(0)
2007	Quilmes	17	(3)
2007	Gimnasia LP	14	(1)
2008	Quilmes	0	(0)
2008	Deportivo Cali	28	(4)
2009–2014	Bursaspor	141	(42)
2014–2015	Beijing Guoan	50	(18)
2016–2018	Bursaspor	74	(17)
2019	Deportivo Roca	0	(0)
Total		383	(86)

Managerial career
- 2021: Bursaspor (assistant)
- 2023–2024: Nilüfer Belediyespor
- 2024–2025: Bursaspor
- * Club domestic league appearances and goals

Pablo Martín Batalla (Spanish pronunciation: [ˈpaβlo βaˈtaʝa]; (Note: In isolation, Batalla is pronounced [baˈtaʝa].) born 16 January 1984) is an Argentine football manager and former midfielder.

== Career ==
Batalla started his career with Vélez Sársfield in 2003, he has had two spells with the club, also playing for Pachuca in Mexico and for Quilmes during their relegation season in Clausura 2007.

Batalla signed for Bursaspor for the start of the Turkish Super League 2009–2010 season.

On 19 February 2014, Batalla transferred to Chinese Super League side Beijing Guoan but returned to Bursaspor in late January 2016. He scored his first goal at the 2015–16 season of the Süper Lig against Eskişehirspor on 27 February 2016.

== Later career ==
In August 2019, Batalla returned to Deportivo Roca as a sporting director and player. He got his debut as a player on 9 September 2019.

== Club ==
As of 18 May 2018

Appearances and goals by club, season and competition
Club	Season	League			Cup		International		Total	
Club	Season	Division	Apps	Goals	Apps	Goals	Apps	Goals	Apps	Goals
Deportivo Cali	2009	Categoría Primera A	20	10	0	0	0	0	20	10
Bursaspor	2009–10	Süper Lig	25	8	0	0	0	0	25	8
Bursaspor	2010–11	Süper Lig	32	3	3	0	3	1	38	4
Bursaspor	2011–12	Süper Lig	40	13	4	2	4	0	48	15
Bursaspor	2012–13	Süper Lig	33	15	4	1	4	3	41	19
Bursaspor	2013–14	Süper Lig	11	3	0	0	2	1	13	4
Bursaspor	Total		141	42	11	3	13	5	165	50
Beijing Guoan	2014	Chinese Super League	20	8	1	1	0	0	21	9
Beijing Guoan	2015	Chinese Super League	30	10	0	0	9	4	39	14
Beijing Guoan	Total		50	18	1	1	9	4	60	23
Bursaspor	2015–16	Süper Lig	14	3	0	0	—		14	3
Bursaspor	2016–17	Süper Lig	31	9	3	0	—		34	9
Bursaspor	2017–18	Süper Lig	29	5	1	0	—		30	5
Bursaspor	Total		74	17	4	0	—		78	17
Career total			279	87	16	4	22	9	317	100

== Honours ==
Vélez Sársfield

- Primera División Argentina (1): 2005 Clausura

Bursaspor

- Süper Lig (1): 2009–2010
