= Ivan Radeljić =

Bosnian footballer (born 1980)

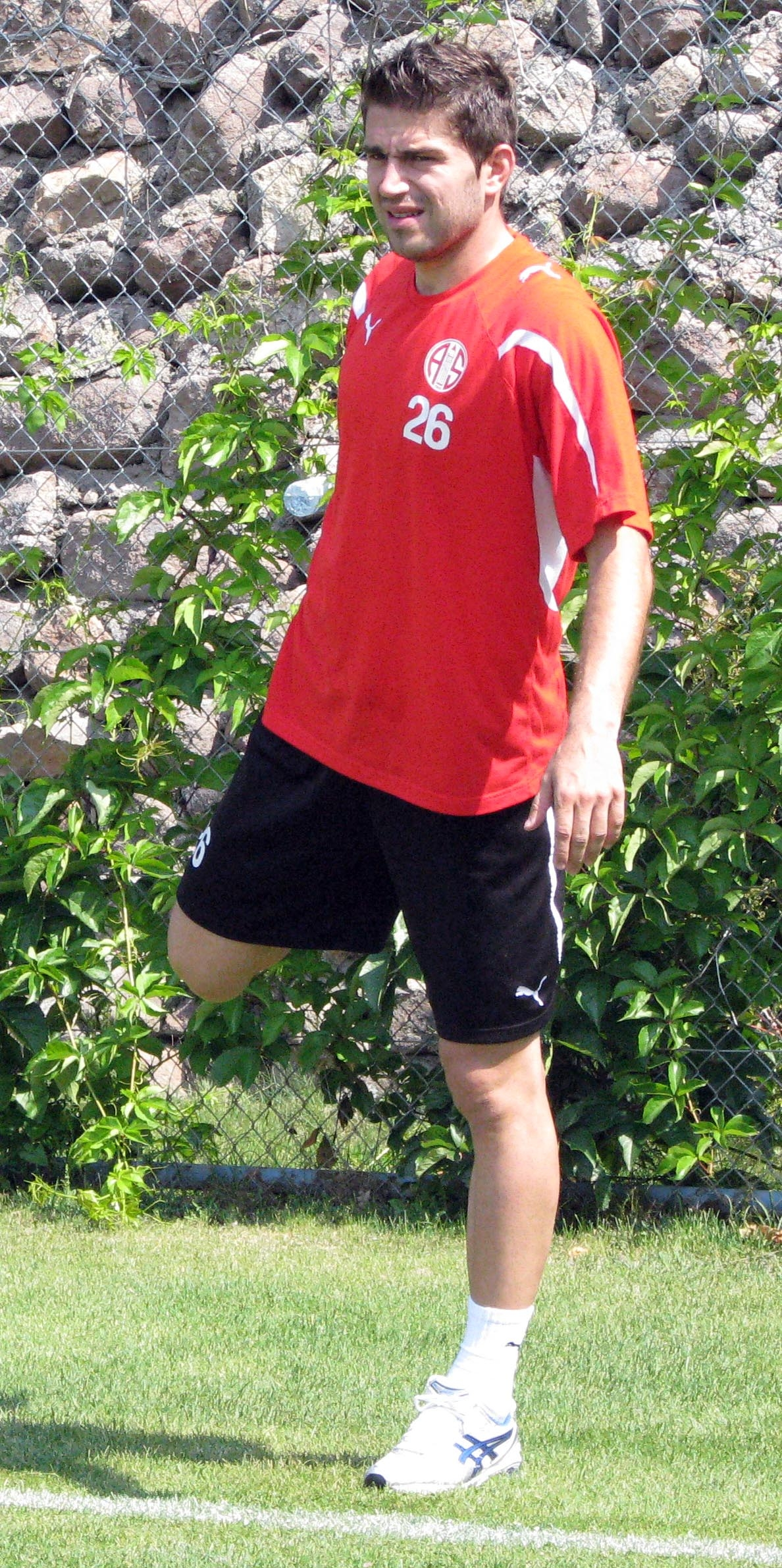
- Radeljić in 2007

Personal information
- Date of birth: 14 September 1980 (age 46)
- Place of birth: Imotski, SR Croatia, Yugoslavia
- Height: 1.89 m (6 ft 2 in)
- Position: Defender

Team information
- Current team: Croatia Zmijavci (manager)

Youth career
- NK Vinjani
- Hajduk Split

Senior career*
Years	Team	Apps	(Gls)
1999–2003	Hajduk Split	25	(0)
1999	→ Zadar (loan)	0	(0)
2001–2002	→ Šibenik (loan)	23	(1)
2003–2004	Inter Zaprešić	16	(0)
2004	Cerezo Osaka	15	(0)
2004–2005	Inter Zaprešić	32	(0)
2006–2008	Slaven Belupo	62	(2)
2008–2009	Energie Cottbus	42	(0)
2009–2010	Gençlerbirliği	22	(0)
2010–2012	Antalyaspor	36	(0)
2012–2015	RNK Split	21	(1)

International career
1999–2000	Croatia U-20	4	(0)
2007–2009	Bosnia and Herzegovina	10	(0)

Managerial career
- 2018–2019: Imotski
- 2019–2020: Hrvace
- 2020–2022: RNK Split
- 2023–2024: Slaven Belupo (assistant)
- 2024: Slaven Belupo
- 2024–: Croatia Zmijavci
- * Club domestic league appearances and goals

Ivan Radeljić (born 14 September 1980) is a Bosnian football manager and a former player who played as a defender. He is the manager of the Croatian club Croatia Zmijavci.

== Club career ==
Radeljić has spent a long period playing in Croatian football league for different clubs. He moved to Germany and signed a contract with FC Energie Cottbus in January 2008. He played 16 matches in his first Bundesliga season. He was released by Energie Cottbus in August 2009 and signed for Gençlerbirliği S.K.

== International career ==
Although he never played at Premier League BiH, he made his international debut for Bosnia and Herzegovina against Norway in March 2007. That was the first match after Fuad Muzurović got promoted as head coach. Radeljić substituted Safet Nadarević at that match. He has earned a total of 10 caps, scoring no goals. His final international was an August 2009 friendly match against Iran.

== Club statistics ==
Club performance			League	
Season	Club	League	Apps	Goals
Croatia			League	
1999–00	Hajduk Split	Prva HNL	8	0
1999–00	Zadar	Druga HNL	0	0
2000–01	Hajduk Split	Prva HNL	5	0
2001–02	Šibenik	Prva HNL	23	1
2002–03	Hajduk Split	Prva HNL	13	0
2003–04	Inter Zaprešić	Prva HNL	16	0
Japan			League	
2004	Cerezo Osaka	J1 League	15	0
Croatia			League	
2004–05	Inter Zaprešić	Prva HNL	14	0
2005–06	Inter Zaprešić	Prva HNL	18	0
2005–06	Slaven Belupo	Prva HNL	14	0
2006–07	Slaven Belupo	Prva HNL	31	1
2007–08	Slaven Belupo	Prva HNL	17	1
Germany			League	
2007–08	Energie Cottbus	Bundesliga	16	0
2008–09	Energie Cottbus	Bundesliga	25	0
Turkey			League	
2009–10	Gençlerbirliği	Süper Lig		
Country	Croatia		159	3
Country	Japan		15	0
Country	Germany		41	0
Country	Turkey		0	0
Total			215	3
