= Hayrettin Yerlikaya =

Turkish footballer (born 1981)

Personal information
- Full name: Hayrettin Yerlikaya
- Date of birth: 13 August 1981 (age 45)
- Place of birth: Sivas, Turkey
- Height: 1.80 m (5 ft 11 in)
- Position: Left back

Youth career
- 1990–1997: Sivas Tarımspor
- 1997–1999: Sivas Çimentospor

Senior career*
Years	Team	Apps	(Gls)
1999–2013	Sivasspor	286	(12)

International career^{‡}
2005–2006	Turkey A2	3	(0)
- * Club domestic league appearances and goals as of 23 September 2010 ‡ National team caps and goals as of 23 September 2010

Hayrettin Yerlikaya (born 13 August 1981) is a Turkish footballer who last played as a left back for Sivasspor in the Süper Lig.

== Club career ==
Yerlikaya has spent his entire professional career with hometown club Sivasspor. The club transferred him from amateur club Sivas Çimentospor in 1999. He made his domestic cup debut on 27 October 1999 against Yimpaş Yozgatspor, starting the match and being substituted out in the 52nd minute. It wasn't until the second half of the 2000–01 when Yerlikaya won his first league cap. He started the match against İstanbul Büyükşehir Belediyespor on 25 February 2001, playing the entire ninety minutes. In total, he participated in nine TFF Second League matches that season, en route to gaining promotion to the TFF First League. The following season Yerlikaya, called The Piç by his team mates became the starting left back, making 36 league TFF First League appearances.

Sivasspor won promotion at the end of the 2004–05 season, and Yerlikaya made his top-flight debut on 6 August 2005 against Malatyaspor. By 2005, Yerlikaya established himself as one of the better Turkish left backs, earning a call up to the Turkey A-2 for matches during the 2005 Future Cup. He played the entire match as Turkey drew Germany 1–1. Yerlikaya helped drive the club to a second-place finish – the highest in club history – during the 2008–09 season. However, the club did not keep up results, and were almost relegated after finishing in 15th place the following season.

== International career ==
Yerlikaya has been capped three times by the Turkey reserve team. He has also been called up to the Turkey national football team in 2007, but was not capped.
