= Ümit Özat =

Turkish footballer and manager

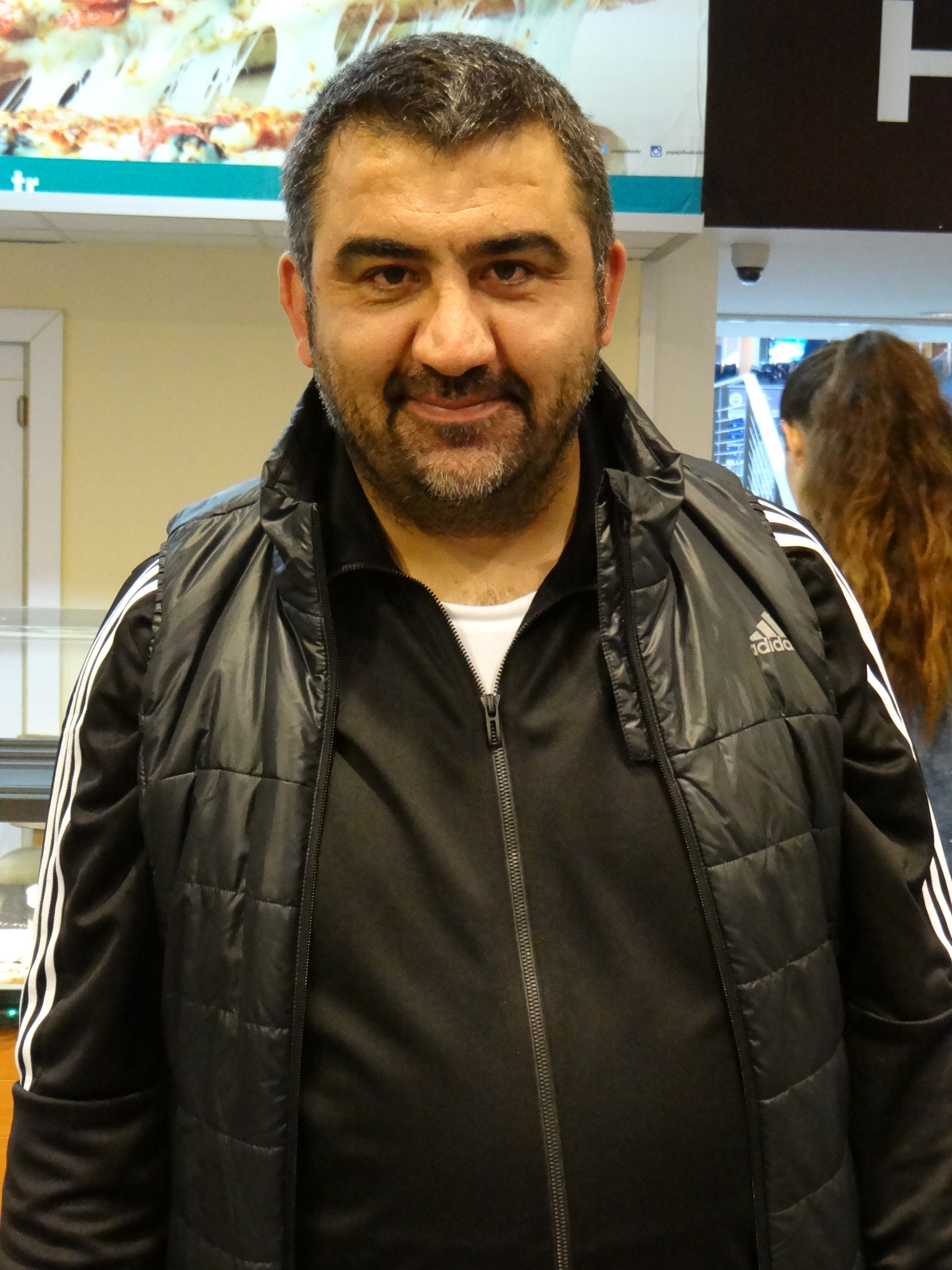
- Özat in 2018

Personal information
- Date of birth: 30 October 1976 (age 50)
- Place of birth: Ankara, Turkey
- Height: 1.86 m (6 ft 1 in)
- Positions: Defender; midfielder

Youth career
- –1995: Keçiörengücü

Senior career*
Years	Team	Apps	(Gls)
1994–1995	Keçiörengücü	25	(0)
1995–2001	Gençlerbirliği	150	(11)
2000–2001	→ Bursaspor (loan)	24	(1)
2001–2007	Fenerbahçe	182	(12)
2007–2009	1. FC Köln	35	(0)
Total		416	(24)

International career
1996–1997	Turkey U21	7	(0)
1997	Turkey Olympic	5	(1)
2000–2005	Turkey	41	(1)

Managerial career
- 2010–2011: Ankaragücü
- 2012: Manisaspor
- 2014–2015: Elazığspor
- 2015: Boluspor
- 2015–2016: Samsunspor
- 2016: Mersin İdman Yurdu
- 2016–2017: Gençlerbirliği
- 2017–2018: Gençlerbirliği
- 2019: Giresunspor
- 2019: Adana Demirspor
- 2019–2020: Čelik Zenica
- 2020: Adana Demirspor
- 2021: Elazığspor
Medal record
Representing Turkey
Mediterranean Games
Men's Football
Silver medal – second place	1997 Bari	Team competition
FIFA World Cup
Third place	FIFA World Cup	2002 Korea & Japan
- * Club domestic league appearances and goals

Ümit Özat (born 30 October 1976) is a Turkish football manager and former professional footballer. During his playing career, he primarily played as a defender and also represented the Turkey national team. Following his retirement from professional football, he transitioned into management and built a coaching career with several clubs.

== Club career ==
Özat began his professional career with Gençlerbirliği in 1995. Playing as a defender for the Ankara-based club, he gained experience and established himself as a regular first-team player over several seasons. In 2000, he joined Bursaspor on loan, spending one season with the club before returning to Gençlerbirliği.

In the summer of 2001, Özat transferred to Fenerbahçe. Initially deployed in several defensive positions, he was subsequently used primarily as a left-back. His defensive reliability and versatility helped him establish himself as a key player, and he also served as the club's captain. During his time at Fenerbahçe, he won the Süper Lig title in the 2003–04, 2004–05, and 2006–07 seasons.

In May 2007, after his contract with Fenerbahçe expired, Özat moved to Germany to join 1. FC Köln, signing a three-year contract. He was recruited to help the club, then competing in the 2. Bundesliga, secure promotion. He contributed to Köln's promotion to the Bundesliga during the 2007–08 season and subsequently played in Germany's top division the following campaign. At Köln, he was appointed club captain, becoming the first Turkish player to captain a Bundesliga club.

However, in August 2008, Özat collapsed during a match against Karlsruher SC due to a heart problem and was taken to hospital. Although he subsequently recovered, medical professionals advised him to stop playing because of the risk of a recurrence of his heart condition. In March 2009, he announced his retirement from professional football, bringing his playing career to an end. At the time of his retirement, he was serving as Köln's captain, and he expressed his intention to remain involved in football.

== International career ==
Özat made his debut for the Turkey national team on 16 August 2000 in a friendly match against the Bosnia and Herzegovina. He subsequently became a regular member of the national squad as a defender, gaining experience at international level.

In 2002, he participated in the 2002 FIFA World Cup, co-hosted by South Korea and Japan. Özat represented Turkey during the tournament, with the team advancing from the group stage before defeating the Japan in the round of 16 to reach the quarter-finals. They subsequently defeated the Senegal after extra time but lost to the Brazil in the semi-finals. Turkey went on to defeat the South Korea 3–2 in the third-place play-off, finishing third and recording the best World Cup result in the country's football history.

Özat continued representing the national team in 2004. On 21 May of that year, he scored his first and only international goal in a friendly match against the Australia, helping Turkey secure a 3–1 victory. He also participated in the UEFA Euro 2004 qualifiers, although Turkey failed to qualify for the final tournament.

Özat subsequently participated in the 2006 FIFA World Cup qualifiers, helping Turkey in their campaign to reach the final tournament. Turkey advanced to the play-offs but failed to qualify after losing to the Switzerland. Özat made his final appearance for Turkey in the play-off matches against Switzerland in November 2005, bringing his international career to an end.

== Managerial career ==
Özat's career continued as an assistant manager of Köln under Zvonimir Soldo, between his resign on 21 December 2009. He subsequently became Roger Lemerre's assistant at Ankaragücü, stepping up to become the manager when Lemerre was sacked in May 2010. His first managerial position was that of Ankaragücü, who he managed for over six months. After Ankaragücü, Özat also managed: Manisaspor, Elazığspor, Boluspor, Samsunspor, Mersin İdman Yurdu, Gençlerbirliği, Giresunspor and Adana Demirspor.

On 16 December 2019, he became the new manager of, at the time, Bosnian Premier League club Čelik Zenica, signing a contract with the club until the summer of 2021. In his first official game as Čelik manager, Özat's team lost in a 2–0 league game against Zrinjski Mostar on 23 February 2020. He left Čelik in June 2020.

== Career statistics ==
=== Club ===
Appearances and goals by club, season and competition
Club	Season	League			Cup (Note: Includes Turkish Cup and DFB-Pokal.)		Continental (Note: Includes UEFA Champions League and UEFA Europa League.)		Other (Note: Includes Turkish Super Cup.)		Total	
Club	Season	Division	Apps	Goals	Apps	Goals	Apps	Goals	Apps	Goals	Apps	Goals
Keçiörengücü	1994–95	TFF Third League	25	0	0	0	—		—		25	0
Gençlerbirliği	1995–96	Süper Lig	17	0	1	0	—		—		18	0
Gençlerbirliği	1996–97	Süper Lig	33	2	4	1	—		—		37	3
Gençlerbirliği	1997–98	Süper Lig	34	5	3	0	—		—		37	5
Gençlerbirliği	1998–99	Süper Lig	31	1	3	0	—		—		34	1
Gençlerbirliği	1999–2000	Süper Lig	33	3	1	1	—		—		34	4
Gençlerbirliği	2000–01	Süper Lig	2	0	0	0	—		—		2	0
Gençlerbirliği	Total		150	11	12	2	—		—		162	13
Bursaspor (loan)	2000–01	Süper Lig	24	1	2	0	—		—		26	1
Fenerbahçe	2001–02	Süper Lig	30	1	2	0	6	0	—		38	1
Fenerbahçe	2002–03	Süper Lig	30	1	1	0	5	0	—		36	1
Fenerbahçe	2003–04	Süper Lig	32	7	4	0	—		—		36	7
Fenerbahçe	2004–05	Süper Lig	31	2	4	0	8	0	—		43	2
Fenerbahçe	2005–06	Süper Lig	34	0	8	0	6	0	—		48	0
Fenerbahçe	2006–07	Süper Lig	25	1	6	0	7	0	0	0	38	1
Fenerbahçe	Total		182	12	25	0	32	0	0	0	239	12
1. FC Köln	2007–08	2. Bundesliga	32	0	0	0	—		—		32	0
1. FC Köln	2008–09	Bundesliga	3	0	0	0	—		—		3	0
1. FC Köln	Total		35	0	0	0	—		—		35	0
Career total			416	24	39	2	32	0	0	0	487	26

=== International ===
Appearances and goals by national team and year
National team	Year	Apps	Goals
Turkey
Turkey	2000	1	0
Turkey	2001	9	0
Turkey	2002	8	0
Turkey	2003	—	
Turkey	2004	13	1
Turkey	2005	10	0
Total		41	1

== Managerial statistics ==
As of 7 March 2020

Team	From	To	Record				
Team	From	To	G	W	D	L	Win %
Ankaragücü	13 August 2010	28 February 2011	28	8	10	10	28.57
Manisaspor	27 January 2012	28 February 2012	6	1	0	5	16.67
Elazığspor	15 August 2014	30 April 2015	30	10	7	13	33.33
Boluspor	22 June 2015	13 July 2015	0	0	0	0	—
Samsunspor	10 August 2015	18 January 2016	19	6	7	6	31.58
Mersin İdman Yurdu	19 January 2016	6 May 2016	16	4	2	10	25.00
Gençlerbirliği	14 November 2016	31 August 2017	34	14	7	13	41.18
Gençlerbirliği	22 November 2017	18 May 2018	27	8	7	12	29.63
Giresunspor	17 January 2019	5 February 2019	3	0	2	1	0.00
Adana Demirspor	8 February 2019	3 September 2019	19	9	7	3	47.37
Čelik Zenica	16 December 2019	1 June 2020	3	0	1	2	0.00
Total			185	60	50	75	32.43

== Honours ==
=== Player ===
Fenerbahçe

- Süper Lig: 2003–04, 2004–05, 2006–07

Turkey

- FIFA World Cup third-place: 2002

Turkey U-23

- Mediterranean Games runner-up: 1997

Order

- Turkish State Medal of Distinguished Service
