= Sebastián Pinto =

Chilean footballer (born 1986)

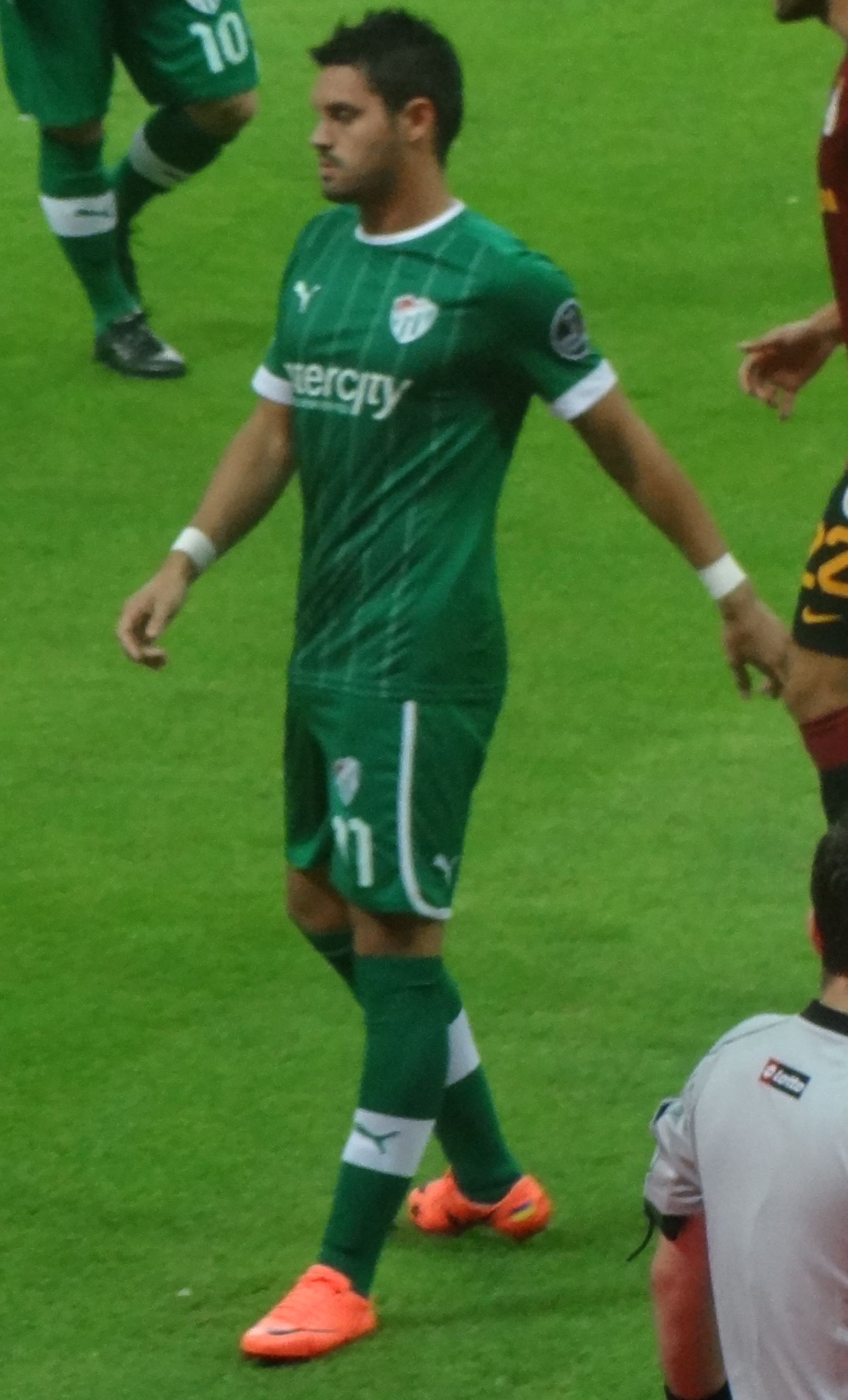
- Pinto with Bursaspor in 2012

Personal information
- Full name: Sebastián Andrés Pinto Perurena
- Date of birth: 5 February 1986 (age 40)
- Place of birth: Santiago de Chile, Chile
- Height: 1.87 m (6 ft 2 in)
- Position: Striker

Youth career
- 1998–2005: Universidad de Chile

Senior career*
Years	Team	Apps	(Gls)
2005–2007	Universidad de Chile	34	(10)
2006	→ Cobreloa (loan)	20	(5)
2008	Santos	0	(0)
2009	Godoy Cruz	5	(0)
2009–2010	Audax Italiano	27	(9)
2011	Varese	3	(0)
2011	O'Higgins	14	(13)
2012–2014	Bursaspor	48	(19)
2014	Millonarios	4	(1)
2015	O'Higgins	13	(3)
2015–2016	Eskişehirspor	13	(1)
2016	Quilmes	7	(0)
2017	Palestino	13	(4)
2019	Deportes Temuco	5	(0)
Total		206	(65)

International career
2011–2013	Chile	5	(3)
- * Club domestic league appearances and goals

Sebastián Pinto (born 5 February 1986) is a Chilean former professional footballer who played as a striker. His last team was Chilean Primera B club Deportes Temuco.

== Career ==
=== Begins of his career ===
Pinto began his career in the youth categories of Universidad de Chile, but had no regularity and was sent on loan to Cobreloa to gain more experience. He played also in Santos, Godoy Cruz, Audax Italiano and the Italian club Varese between 2008 and 2011.

=== O'Higgins, Bursaspor and Millonarios ===
In 2011, he came to O'Higgins where he was the second top-scorer of the tournament. In January 2012 he arrived at Turkish football club Bursaspor, being the top-scorer of the national cup with 5 goals. After almost three years at the club, he left finishing with a total of 65 games played and 29 goals. After that he went to Millonarios F.C. in 2014, playing 4 matches and scoring 1 goal.

=== Back to Chile ===
In 2015, he come back to O'Higgins, signing to the team for the Clausura 2014–15.

== International career ==
His debut for the Chile national team in 2006 on an unofficial friendly against the Aragon official football team. He returned later in 2011, in a friendly against Paraguay where he scored a hat-trick (one goal on a penalty shot).

International appearances and goals
#	Date	Venue	Opponent	Result	Competition	Goal
1	21 December 2011	Estadio La Portada, La Serena, Chile	Paraguay	3–2	Friendly	3(3)
2	9 June 2012	Estadio José Antonio Anzoátegui, Puerto La Cruz, Venezuela	Venezuela	2–0	2014 FIFA World Cup qualification	
3	11 September 2012	Estadio Monumental David Arellano, Santiago, Chile	Colombia	1–3	2014 FIFA World Cup qualification	

== Personal life ==
He is the son of the journalist and television presenter Carlos Pinto. His sister, Carla, is a DJ who took part in the reality show Mundos opuestos 2 in 2013.

Following his retirement, he made his home in Santa Cruz do Sul, Brazil, and turned into a paddle tennis player. From Brazil, he founded and manages Pádel Club Chile in Lo Barnechea, Santiago.
