= 2008 Toulon Tournament squads =

Below are the rosters for the 2008 Toulon Tournament. The given age and club affiliation were current as of the start of the tournament.

Those marked in bold have now been capped at full international level.

== Group A ==
=== Chile ===
Head coach: (Argentina) Marcelo Bielsa

| No. | Pos. | Player | Date of birth (age) | Caps | Goals | Club |
|---|---|---|---|---|---|---|
| 1 | GK | **Cristopher Toselli** | 15 June 1988 (aged 19) | | | (Chile) Universidad Católica |
| 2 | DF | **Juan Abarca** | 20 May 1989 (aged 19) | | | (Chile) Huachipato |
| 3 | DF | **Hans Martínez** | 4 January 1987 (aged 21) | | | (Chile) Universidad Católica |
| 4 | MF | Nicolás Crovetto | 15 March 1986 (aged 22) | | | (Chile) Audax Italiano |
| 5 | DF | **Rafael Caroca** | 17 July 1989 (aged 18) | | | (Chile) Colo-Colo |
| 6 | MF | **Carlos Carmona** | 21 February 1987 (aged 21) | | | (Chile) O'Higgins |
| 7 | FW | **José Pedro Fuenzalida** | 22 February 1985 (aged 23) | | | (Chile) Colo-Colo |
| 8 | MF | **Fernando Meneses** | 27 September 1985 (aged 22) | | | (Chile) Colo-Colo |
| 9 | MF | **Boris Sagredo** | 21 March 1989 (aged 19) | | | (Chile) Colo-Colo |
| 10 | MF | **Pedro Morales** | 25 May 1985 (aged 22) | | | Universidad de Chile |
| 11 | FW | **Juan Gonzalo Lorca** | 15 January 1985 (aged 23) | | | (Netherlands) Vitesse |
| 12 | GK | Raúl Olivares | 14 April 1988 (aged 20) | | | (Chile) Colo-Colo |
| 13 | DF | Nelson Rebolledo | 14 November 1985 (aged 22) | | | (Chile) Huachipato |
| 14 | FW | **Fabián Orellana** | 27 January 1986 (aged 22) | | | (Chile) Audax Italiano |
| 15 | MF | **Carlos Villanueva** | 5 February 1986 (aged 22) | | | (Chile) Audax Italiano |
| 16 | FW | **Eduardo Vargas** | 20 November 1989 (aged 18) | | | (Chile) Cobreloa |
| 17 | DF | **Gary Medel** | 3 October 1987 (aged 20) | | | (Chile) Universidad Católica |
| 18 | DF | **Gonzalo Jara** | 29 August 1985 (aged 22) | | | (Chile) Colo-Colo |

=== France ===
Head coach: Jean Gallice

| No. | Pos. | Player | Date of birth (age) | Caps | Goals | Club |
|---|---|---|---|---|---|---|
| 1 | GK | **Benoît Costil** | 30 July 1987 (aged 20) | 0 | 0 | (France) Caen |
| 2 | DF | Mohamadou Sissoko | 8 August 1988 (aged 19) | 0 | 0 | (Italy) Udinese |
| 3 | DF | Vincent Muratori | 3 August 1987 (aged 20) | 1 | 0 | (France) Monaco |
| 4 | MF | **Ricardo Faty** | 4 August 1986 (aged 21) | 5 | 1 | (France) Nantes |
| 5 | DF | **Sébastien Bassong** | 9 July 1986 (aged 21) | 0 | 0 | (France) Metz |
| 6 | MF | Pierre Ducasse | 7 May 1987 (aged 21) | 1 | 0 | (France) Bordeaux |
| 7 | FW | **Razak Boukari** | 25 April 1987 (aged 21) | 5 | 1 | (France) Lens |
| 8 | MF | Julien Quercia | 17 August 1986 (aged 21) | 1 | 1 | (France) Auxerre |
| 9 | FW | Jirès Kembo Ekoko | 8 January 1988 (aged 20) | 1 | 0 | (France) Sedan |
| 10 | FW | Elliot Grandin | 17 October 1987 (aged 20) | 1 | 0 | (France) Marseille |
| 11 | MF | Anthony Mounier | 27 September 1987 (aged 20) | 1 | 0 | (France) Lyon |
| 12 | MF | **Richard Soumah** | 6 October 1986 (aged 21) | 0 | 0 | (France) Guingamp |
| 13 | DF | Cyriaque Louvion | 24 July 1987 (aged 20) | 5 | 1 | (France) Le Mans |
| 14 | FW | Xavier Pentecôte | 13 August 1986 (aged 21) | 5 | 4 | (France) Bastia |
| 15 | MF | Damien Plessis | 5 March 1988 (aged 20) | 1 | 0 | (England) Liverpool |
| 16 | GK | Geoffrey Jourdren | 4 February 1986 (aged 22) | 5 | 0 | (France) Caen |
| 17 | MF | Alexandre Bonnet | 17 October 1986 (aged 21) | 1 | 1 | (France) Sedan |
| 18 | DF | Paul Baysse | 18 May 1988 (aged 20) | 1 | 0 | (France) Sedan |
| 19 | DF | Samuel Bouhours | 26 June 1987 (aged 20) | 0 | 0 | (France) Le Mans |
| 20 | DF | Mohamed Chakouri | 21 May 1986 (aged 21) | 5 | 1 | (Belgium) Charleroi |
| 21 | FW | Alexis Allart | 7 August 1986 (aged 21) | 0 | 0 | (France) Sedan |

=== Japan ===
Head coach: Yasuharu Sorimachi

| No. | Pos. | Player | Date of birth (age) | Caps | Goals | Club |
|---|---|---|---|---|---|---|
| 1 | GK | **Shusaku Nishikawa** | 18 June 1986 (aged 21) | | | (Japan) Oita Trinita |
| 2 | MF | **Hajime Hosogai** | 10 June 1986 (aged 21) | | | (Japan) Urawa Red Diamonds |
| 3 | DF | **Naoaki Aoyama** | 18 July 1986 (aged 21) | | | (Japan) Shimizu S-Pulse |
| 4 | DF | **Hiroki Mizumoto** | 12 September 1985 (aged 22) | | | (Japan) Gamba Osaka |
| 5 | DF | **Masahiko Inoha** | 28 August 1985 (aged 22) | | | (Japan) Kashima Antlers |
| 6 | MF | **Toshihiro Aoyama** | 22 February 1986 (aged 22) | | | (Japan) Sanfrecce Hiroshima |
| 7 | MF | **Koki Mizuno** | 6 September 1985 (aged 22) | | | (Scotland) Celtic |
| 8 | MF | **Keisuke Honda** | 13 June 1986 (aged 21) | | | (Netherlands) VVV-Venlo |
| 9 | DF | **Masato Morishige** | 21 May 1987 (aged 20) | | | (Japan) Oita Trinita |
| 10 | MF | Yohei Kajiyama | 24 September 1985 (aged 22) | | | (Japan) FC Tokyo |
| 11 | FW | **Shinji Okazaki** | 16 April 1986 (aged 22) | | | (Japan) Shimizu S-Pulse |
| 12 | DF | Yusuke Tanaka | 14 April 1986 (aged 22) | | | (Japan) Yokohama F. Marinos |
| 13 | MF | **Hiroyuki Taniguchi** | 27 June 1985 (aged 22) | | | (Japan) Kawasaki Frontale |
| 14 | DF | Hokuto Nakamura | 10 July 1985 (aged 22) | | | (Japan) Avispa Fukuoka |
| 15 | MF | Kota Ueda | 9 May 1986 (aged 22) | | | (Japan) Jubilo Iwata |
| 16 | MF | **Takuya Honda** | 17 April 1985 (aged 23) | | | (Japan) Shimizu S-Pulse |
| 17 | MF | **Tsukasa Umesaki** | 23 February 1987 (aged 21) | | | (Japan) Urawa Red Diamonds |
| 18 | GK | **Kaito Yamamoto** | 10 July 1985 (aged 22) | | | (Japan) Shimizu S-Pulse |
| 19 | DF | **Maya Yoshida** | 24 August 1988 (aged 19) | | | (Japan) Nagoya Grampus |
| 20 | FW | **Tadanari Lee** | 19 December 1985 (aged 22) | | | (Japan) Kashiwa Reysol |
| 21 | GK | Akihiro Hayashi | 7 May 1987 (aged 21) | | | (Japan) Ryutsu Keizai University |
| 22 | FW | **Takayuki Morimoto** | 7 May 1988 (aged 20) | | | (Italy) Catania |
| 23 | MF | Sergio Escudero | 1 September 1988 (aged 19) | | | (Japan) Urawa Red Diamonds |

=== Netherlands ===
Head coach: Hans Schrijver

| No. | Pos. | Player | Date of birth (age) | Caps | Goals | Club |
|---|---|---|---|---|---|---|
| 1 | GK | **Tim Krul** | 3 April 1988 (aged 20) | | | (Scotland) Falkirk |
| 2 | DF | Jeffrey Altheer | 9 March 1987 (aged 21) | | | (Netherlands) Excelsior |
| 3 | MF | Lorenzo Davids | 4 September 1986 (aged 21) | | | (Netherlands) NEC |
| 4 | DF | Rens van Eijden | 3 March 1988 (aged 20) | | | (Netherlands) PSV |
| 5 | DF | Niels Fleuren | 1 November 1986 (aged 21) | | | (Netherlands) VVV-Venlo |
| 6 | DF | Tom Hiariej | 25 July 1988 (aged 19) | | | (Netherlands) Groningen |
| 7 | MF | **Dominique Kivuvu** | 16 September 1987 (aged 20) | | | (Netherlands) NEC |
| 8 | DF | Milano Koenders | 31 July 1986 (aged 21) | | | (Netherlands) AZ |
| 9 | DF | Vito Wormgoor | 16 November 1988 (aged 19) | | | (Netherlands) Ajax |
| 10 | MF | **Mitchell Donald** | 10 December 1988 (aged 19) | | | (Netherlands) Ajax |
| 11 | DF | Jan-Arie van der Heijden | 3 March 1988 (aged 20) | | | (Netherlands) Ajax |
| 12 | MF | Willem Janssen | 4 July 1986 (aged 21) | | | (Netherlands) Roda JC |
| 13 | MF | Jeffrey Sarpong | 3 August 1988 (aged 19) | | | (Netherlands) Ajax |
| 14 | MF | Robbert Schilder | 18 April 1986 (aged 22) | | | (Netherlands) Heracles Almelo |
| 15 | MF | **Ruud Vormer** | 11 May 1988 (aged 20) | | | (Netherlands) AZ |
| 16 | GK | Wesley De Ruiter | 13 January 1986 (aged 22) | | | (Netherlands) Utrecht |
| 17 | MF | **Kemy Agustien** | 20 August 1986 (aged 21) | | | (Netherlands) AZ |
| 18 | FW | **Eljero Elia** | 13 February 1987 (aged 21) | | | (Netherlands) Twente |
| 19 | FW | Leroy George | 21 April 1987 (aged 21) | | | (Netherlands) Utrecht |
| 20 | FW | Istvan Bakx | 20 January 1986 (aged 22) | | | (Belgium) Kortrijk |
| 21 | FW | Stefan Nijland | 10 August 1988 (aged 19) | | | (Netherlands) Groningen |
| 22 | FW | Rydell Poepon | 28 August 1987 (aged 20) | | | (Netherlands) Willem II |

== Group B ==
=== Italy ===
Head coach: Pierluigi Casiraghi

| No. | Pos. | Player | Date of birth (age) | Caps | Goals | Club |
|---|---|---|---|---|---|---|
| 1 | GK | Davide Bassi | 12 April 1985 (aged 23) | | | (Italy) Empoli |
| 2 | DF | **Marco Motta** | 14 May 1986 (aged 22) | | | (Italy) Torino |
| 3 | DF | Paolo De Ceglie | 17 September 1986 (aged 21) | | | (Italy) Siena |
| 4 | MF | **Antonio Nocerino** | 9 April 1985 (aged 23) | | | (Italy) Juventus |
| 5 | DF | Lino Marzoratti | 12 October 1986 (aged 21) | | | (Italy) Empoli |
| 6 | DF | **Salvatore Bocchetti** | 30 November 1986 (aged 21) | | | (Italy) Frosinone |
| 7 | FW | Davide Lanzafame | 9 February 1987 (aged 21) | | | (Italy) Bari |
| 8 | MF | Tiberio Guarente | 1 November 1985 (aged 22) | | | (Italy) Atalanta |
| 9 | FW | **Pablo Osvaldo** | 12 January 1986 (aged 22) | | | (Italy) Fiorentina |
| 10 | MF | **Sebastian Giovinco** | 26 January 1987 (aged 21) | | | (Italy) Empoli |
| 11 | MF | **Claudio Marchisio** | 19 January 1986 (aged 22) | | | (Italy) Empoli |
| 12 | GK | Enrico Alfonso | 4 May 1988 (aged 20) | | | (Italy) Venezia |
| 13 | DF | Andrea Coda | 25 April 1985 (aged 23) | | | (Italy) Udinese |
| 14 | MF | **Daniele Galloppa** | 15 May 1985 (aged 23) | | | (Italy) Siena |
| 15 | DF | Hernan Dellafiore | 2 February 1985 (aged 23) | | | (Italy) Palermo |
| 16 | DF | **Lorenzo De Silvestri** | 23 May 1988 (aged 19) | | | (Italy) Lazio |
| 17 | MF | **Ignazio Abate** | 12 November 1986 (aged 21) | | | (Italy) Empoli |
| 18 | MF | **Antonio Candreva** | 28 February 1987 (aged 21) | | | (Italy) Udinese |
| 19 | FW | **Graziano Pellè** | 15 July 1985 (aged 22) | | | (Netherlands) AZ |
| 20 | MF | Daniele Dessena | 10 May 1987 (aged 21) | | | (Italy) Parma |
| 21 | MF | Luca Cigarini | 20 June 1986 (aged 21) | | | (Italy) Parma |

=== Ivory Coast ===
Head coach: (France) Gérard Gili

| No. | Pos. | Player | Date of birth (age) | Caps | Goals | Club |
|---|---|---|---|---|---|---|
| 1 | GK | Christian Fabrice Okoua | 19 November 1991 (aged 16) | | | (Ivory Coast) Africa Sports |
| 2 | DF | **Mamadou Bagayoko** | 31 December 1989 (aged 18) | | | (Ivory Coast) Africa Sports |
| 3 | DF | Serges Déblé | 1 October 1989 (aged 18) | | | (Ivory Coast) ASEC Mimosas |
| 4 | DF | **Sol Bamba** | 13 January 1985 (aged 23) | | | (Scotland) Dunfermline Athletic |
| 5 | DF | Serge Wawa | 1 January 1986 (aged 22) | | | (Ivory Coast) ASEC Mimosas |
| 6 | MF | Anthony Moura-Komenan | 20 January 1986 (aged 22) | | | (France) Libourne-Saint-Seurin |
| 7 | MF | Antoine N'Gossan | 30 November 1990 (aged 17) | | | (Ivory Coast) ASEC Mimosas |
| 8 | FW | Ahmed Hervé Diomande | | | | (Ivory Coast) ASEC Mimosas |
| 9 | FW | Guy-Roland Niangbo | 21 May 1986 (aged 21) | | | (Belgium) Charleroi |
| 10 | MF | **Emmanuel Koné** | 31 December 1986 (aged 21) | | | (Romania) CFR Cluj |
| 11 | FW | Ismaël Béko Fofana | 8 September 1988 (aged 19) | | | (Norway) Fredrikstad |
| 12 | FW | Franck Dja Djédjé | 2 June 1986 (aged 21) | | | (France) Grenoble |
| 13 | DF | **Constant Djakpa** | 17 October 1986 (aged 21) | | | (Romania) Pandurii Târgu Jiu |
| 14 | MF | **Kafoumba Coulibaly** | 26 October 1985 (aged 22) | | | (France) Bastia |
| 15 | FW | **Sekou Cissé** | 23 May 1985 (aged 22) | | | (Netherlands) Roda JC |
| 16 | GK | **Badra Ali Sangaré** | 30 May 1986 (aged 21) | | | (Thailand) BEC Tero Sasana |

=== Turkey ===
Head coach: Ümit Davala

| No. | Pos. | Player | Date of birth (age) | Caps | Goals | Club |
|---|---|---|---|---|---|---|
| 1 | GK | Ufuk Ceylan | 23 June 1986 (aged 21) | | | (Turkey) Vestel Manisaspor |
| 2 | DF | Durmuş Bayram | 15 March 1986 (aged 22) | | | (Turkey) Kayserispor |
| 3 | DF | Alparslan Erdem | 11 December 1988 (aged 19) | | | (Germany) Werder Bremen |
| 4 | DF | **Eren Güngör** | 2 April 1988 (aged 20) | | | (Turkey) Altay |
| 5 | DF | Orhan Şam | 1 June 1986 (aged 21) | | | (Turkey) Gençlerbirliği OFTAŞ |
| 6 | MF | Mehmet Güven | 30 July 1987 (aged 20) | | | (Turkey) Galatasaray |
| 7 | MF | **Caner Erkin** | 4 October 1988 (aged 19) | | | (Russia) CSKA Moscow |
| 8 | MF | **Özer Hurmacı** | 20 November 1986 (aged 21) | | | (Turkey) Ankaraspor |
| 9 | FW | İlhan Parlak | 18 January 1987 (aged 21) | | | (Turkey) Fenerbahçe |
| 10 | MF | **Nuri Şahin** | 5 September 1988 (aged 19) | | | (Netherlands) Feyenoord |
| 11 | FW | Özgürcan Özcan | 10 April 1988 (aged 20) | | | (Turkey) Gaziantepspor |
| 12 | GK | **Onur Kıvrak** | 1 January 1988 (aged 20) | | | (Turkey) Trabzonspor |
| 13 | MF | Bilal Çubukçu | 16 May 1987 (aged 21) | | | (Germany) Hertha BSC |
| 14 | DF | Emre Balak | 11 August 1988 (aged 19) | | | (Turkey) Samsunspor |
| 15 | MF | **Aydın Yılmaz** | 29 January 1988 (aged 20) | | | (Turkey) İstanbul BB |
| 16 | DF | Murat Kalkan | 20 May 1986 (aged 22) | | | (Turkey) Gençlerbirliği OFTAŞ |
| 17 | FW | **Adem Büyük** | 30 August 1987 (aged 20) | | | (Turkey) Altay |
| 18 | DF | Uğur Uçar | 5 April 1987 (aged 21) | | | (Turkey) Galatasaray |
| 19 | DF | **Aykut Demir** | 22 October 1988 (aged 19) | | | (Netherlands) SBV Excelsior |
| 20 | MF | Zafer Yelen | 30 August 1986 (aged 21) | | | (Germany) Hansa Rostock |
| 21 | MF | **Serdar Özkan** | 1 January 1987 (aged 21) | | | (Turkey) Beşiktaş |
| 22 | FW | Tufan Tosunoğlu | 22 July 1988 (aged 19) | | | (Germany) MSV Duisburg |
| 23 | GK | **Sinan Bolat** | 3 September 1988 (aged 19) | | | (Belgium) Racing Genk |

=== United States ===
Head coach: (Poland) Piotr Nowak

| No. | Pos. | Player | Date of birth (age) | Caps | Goals | Club |
|---|---|---|---|---|---|---|
| 1 | GK | Chris Seitz | 12 March 1987 (aged 21) | | | (United States) Real Salt Lake |
| 2 | DF | **Tony Beltran** | 11 October 1987 (aged 20) | | | (United States) Real Salt Lake |
| 3 | DF | Eric Brunner | 12 February 1986 (aged 22) | | | (United States) Miami FC |
| 4 | MF | Bryan Arguez | 13 January 1989 (aged 19) | | | (Germany) Hertha BSC |
| 5 | DF | Rob Valentino | 21 December 1985 (aged 22) | | | (United States) New England Revolution |
| 6 | DF | Julian Valentin | 23 February 1987 (aged 21) | | | (United States) Los Angeles Galaxy |
| 7 | DF | **Kamani Hill** | 28 December 1985 (aged 22) | | | (Germany) Vfl Wolfsburg |
| 8 | FW | Bryan Jordan | 13 September 1985 (aged 22) | | | (United States) Los Angeles Galaxy |
| 9 | FW | Gabriel Ferrari | 1 September 1988 (aged 19) | | | (Italy) Sampdoria |
| 10 | MF | **Benny Feilhaber** | 19 January 1985 (aged 23) | | | (England) Derby County |
| 11 | MF | **Brek Shea** | 28 February 1990 (aged 18) | | | (United States) FC Dallas |
| 12 | FW | Ellis McLoughlin | 8 July 1990 (aged 17) | | | (Germany) Hertha BSC |
| 13 | DF | Blake Wagner | 29 January 1988 (aged 20) | | | (United States) FC Dallas |
| 14 | DF | Jonathan Leathers | 5 November 1985 (aged 22) | | | (United States) Kansas City Wizards |
| 15 | MF | Corey Ashe | 14 March 1986 (aged 22) | | | (United States) Houston Dynamo |
| 16 | GK | Quentin Westberg | 25 April 1986 (aged 22) | | | (France) Troyes |
| 17 | FW | **Lee Nguyen** | 7 October 1986 (aged 21) | | | (Denmark) Randers FC |
| 18 | GK | Dominic Cervi | 9 May 1986 (aged 22) | | | (Scotland) Celtic F.C. |
| 19 | MF | Greg Dalby | 3 November 1985 (aged 22) | | | (Belgium) Charleroi |
| 20 | FW | Sammy Ochoa | 9 September 1986 (aged 21) | | | (Mexico) Tecos UAG |
| 21 | DF | Michael Gavin | 30 March 1987 (aged 21) | | | (United States) Los Angeles Galaxy |
| 22 | DF | Kyle Davies | 11 April 1989 (aged 19) | | | (England) Southampton |
