= 2008 Toulon Tournament =

Toulon Youth Festival

Tournament details
- Host country: France
- Dates: 20–29 May
- Teams: 8 (from 5 confederations)
- Venues: 7 (in 1 host city)

Final positions
- Champions: Italy (1st title)
- Runners-up: Chile

Tournament statistics
- Matches played: 16
- Goals scored: 42 (2.63 per match)
- Top scorer: (Ivory Coast) Sekou Cissé (4 goals)
- Best player: (Italy) Sebastian Giovinco

The 2008 Toulon Tournament was the 36th edition of the Toulon Tournament, and was held from 20 May to 29 May 2008. Tournament finished with the final between Italy and Chile at Stade Mayol in Toulon as Italy had the title after the final score of 1–0, scored by Pablo Osvaldo in the 70th minute.

== Participant teams ==
- Chile
- France (host)
- Italy
- Ivory Coast
- Japan
- Netherlands
- Turkey
- United States

== Venues ==
The matches were held in these communes:

- Aubagne
- Hyères
- La Londe
- La Seyne
- Saint-Cyr-sur-Mer
- Solliès-Pont
- Toulon

== Results ==
=== Group A ===
Team	Pld	W	D	L	GF	GA	GD	Pts	Qualification
Chile	3	3	0	0	9	3	+6	9	Advance to Semi-final
Japan	3	2	0	1	3	3	0	6	Advance to Semi-final
Netherlands	3	1	0	2	1	3	−2	3	
France	3	0	0	3	4	8	−4	0	

Source: US-Soccer

==== Match summaries ====
All times local (UTC+2)

2008-05-20
18:00

Japan	1–0	Netherlands
Lee 64'	report

Toulon

2008-05-20
20:30

France	3–5	Chile
Bonnet 19'; Quercia 23'; Pentecôte 47'	report	Fuenzalida 33'; Martínez 54'; Louvion 80' (o.g.); Lorca 89'; Sagredo 90'

Toulon

2008-05-22
18:00

France	1–2	Japan
Quercia 71'	report	Umesaki 17'; Morimoto 60'

Hyères

2008-05-22
20:30

Netherlands	0–2	Chile
	report	Fuenzalida 19'; Orellana 84' (pen.)

Hyères

2008-05-24
18:30

France	0–1	Netherlands
	report	Kivuvu 53'

Saint Cyr

2008-05-24
18:30

Chile	2–0	Japan
Carmona 75'; Morales 90+2'	report

Solliès-Pont

=== Group B ===
==== Table ====
Team	Pld	W	D	L	GF	GA	GD	Pts	Qualification
Italy	3	3	0	0	6	1	+5	9	Advance to Semi-final
Ivory Coast	3	2	0	1	5	2	+3	6	Advance to Semi-final
Turkey	3	1	0	2	4	8	−4	3	
United States	3	0	0	3	2	6	−4	0	

Source: US-Soccer

==== Match summaries ====
All times local (UTC+2)

2008-05-21
15:30

Turkey	3–2	United States
Güngör 19'; Şahin 35'; Parlak 59'	Report	Brunner 58'; Ochoa 72'

Toulon

2008-05-21
18:00

Ivory Coast	0–2	Italy
	Report	Giovinco 65', 73'

Toulon

2008-05-23
18:30

Ivory Coast	1–0	United States
Djapka 70' (pen.)	Report

La Seyne

2008-05-23
20:30

Italy	2–1	Turkey
Lanzafame 32'; Marchisio 89'	Report	Yılmaz 50'

La Seyne

2008-05-25
18:00

Italy	2–0	United States
Abate 31'; Dessena 36'	Report

La Valette

2008-05-25
18:00

Ivory Coast	4–0	Turkey
Cissé 43', 45+2', 86'; Moura 75'	Report

Aubagne

=== Semi-finals ===
2008-05-27

Chile	2–1	Ivory Coast
Morales 5'; Orellana 60'	Report	Djapka 40'

Toulon

2008-05-27

Italy	0–0 (a.e.t.)	Japan
	Report
Penalties
Bocchetti (penalty scored); Abate (penalty scored); Cigarini (penalty scored); Candreva (penalty scored); Giovinco (penalty scored)	5–4	(penalty scored) K. Honda; (penalty scored) Kajiyama; (penalty scored) Morishige; (penalty missed) Mizuno; (penalty scored) Mizumoto

Toulon

=== Third-place playoff ===
2008-05-29
18:00

Ivory Coast	2–2 (a.e.t.)	Japan
Fofana 31'; Cissé 90+4'	Report	Escudero 72'; Morishige 82'
Penalties
Djapka (penalty scored); Fofana (penalty missed); Kone (penalty scored); Anthony (penalty scored); Cissé (penalty scored)	4–3	(penalty scored) Honda; (penalty scored) Morishige; (penalty scored) Morimoto; (penalty missed) Lee; (penalty missed) Mizumoto

Toulon

=== Final ===
May 29, 2008
20:45

Chile	0–1	Italy
	Report	Osvaldo 70'

Toulon

2008 Toulon Tournament

Italy
First title

== Goal scorers ==
4 goals

- (Ivory Coast) Sekou Cissé

2 goals

- (Chile) José Pedro Fuenzalida
- (Chile) Pedro Morales Flores
- (Chile) Fabián Orellana
- (Ivory Coast) Constant Djapka
- (France) Julien Quercia
- (Italy) Sebastian Giovinco

1 goal

- (Chile) Carlos Carmona
- (Chile) Juan Gonzalo Lorca
- (Chile) Hans Martínez
- (Chile) Boris Sagredo
- (Ivory Coast) Beko Ismael Fofana
- (Ivory Coast) Anthony Moura
- (France) Alexandre Bonnet
- (France) Xavier Pentecôte
- (Italy) Pablo Osvaldo
- (Italy) Ignazio Abate
- (Italy) Daniele Dessena
- (Italy) Davide Lanzafame
- (Italy) Claudio Marchisio
- (Japan) Sergio Escudero
- (Japan) Tadanari Lee
- (Japan) Takayuki Morimoto
- (Japan) Masato Morishige
- (Japan) Tsukasa Umesaki
- (Netherlands) Dominique Kivuvu
- (Turkey) Eren Güngör
- (Turkey) İlhan Parlak
- (Turkey) Nuri Şahin
- (Turkey) Aydın Yılmaz
- (United States) Eric Brunner
- (United States) Sammy Ochoa

Own goal

- (France) Cyriaque Louvion (for Chile)

== Individual awards ==
- Player of the tournament:
  - (Italy) Sebastian Giovinco
- The Best goalkeeper:
  - (Italy) Davide Bassi

== Referees ==
Selected referees according to official website:

Referees:

- (Canada) Steven Depiero
- (Ivory Coast) Monetchet Nahi
- (France) Olivier Thual
- (Italy) Paolo Tagliavento
- (Japan) Kenji Ogiya
- (Portugal) Jorg Sousa
- (Scotland) Iain Brines
- (Turkey) Fırat Aydınus

Assistant Referees:

- (Canada) Daniel Belleau
- (Canada) Darren Clark
- (France) Karl Santigli
- (Italy) Massimiliano Grilli
- (Italy) Renato Faverani
- (Portugal) Jose Ramalho
- (Scotland) Francis Andrews
- (Scotland) Stuart Macaulay
