= Cheick Tioté =

Ivorian footballer (1986–2017)

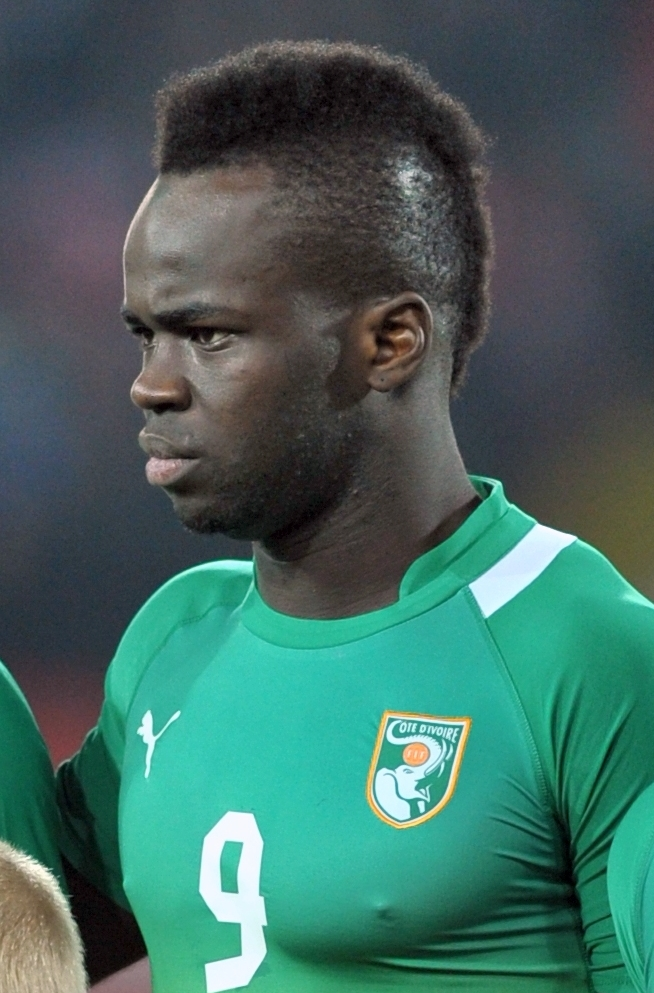
- Tioté representing the Ivory Coast in 2012

Personal information
- Full name: Cheick Ismaël Tioté
- Date of birth: 21 June 1986
- Place of birth: Yamoussoukro, Ivory Coast
- Date of death: 5 June 2017 (aged 30)
- Place of death: Beijing, China
- Height: 1.80 m (5 ft 11 in)
- Position: Defensive midfielder

Youth career
- 1998–2005: FC Bibo

Senior career*
Years	Team	Apps	(Gls)
2005–2008	Anderlecht	4	(0)
2007–2008	→ Roda JC (loan)	26	(2)
2008–2010	Twente	58	(1)
2010–2017	Newcastle United	139	(1)
2017	Beijing Enterprises Group	11	(0)
Total		238	(4)

International career
2009–2015	Ivory Coast	55	(1)
Medal record
Representing Ivory Coast
Men's football
Africa Cup of Nations
Winner	2015 Equatorial Guinea
Runner-up	2012 Equatorial Guinea-Gabon
- * Club domestic league appearances and goals

Cheick Ismaël Tioté (French pronunciation: [ʃɛik ismaɛl tjote]; 21 June 1986 – 5 June 2017) was an Ivorian professional footballer who played as a defensive midfielder.

After playing youth football for FC Bibo in his hometown of Yamoussoukro, he made his professional debut in 2005 with Belgian First Division A club Anderlecht. In 2008, following a loan at Roda JC, he joined Eredivisie club FC Twente, winning the title in his second season. In August 2010, he signed for Premier League club Newcastle United in England for a fee of £3.5 million. Tioté played 156 games for Newcastle over six and a half seasons, scoring one goal. In February 2017, he joined China League One club Beijing Enterprises Group. He died of cardiac arrest in June 2017, during a training session, aged 30.

Tioté played 55 times for the Ivory Coast national team from 2009 to 2015, scoring once. He represented the country at two FIFA World Cups and four Africa Cup of Nations, winning the 2015 edition of the latter.

== Early life ==
Born in Yamoussoukro, Tioté started out playing barefoot street football at the age of 10, not owning a pair of boots until he was 15. He played youth football for Ivorian minor league side FC Bibo.

In an interview with the Evening Chronicle, Tioté said he had nine brothers and sisters. Growing up in Abidjan, he gave up his studies at a young age. He stated that "football has always been the biggest thing to me ... I knew what I wanted to do and made sure that this was going to be my life. But I worked and worked and worked for it and it is because of that hard work that I have managed to make it."

== Club career ==
=== Anderlecht ===
In 2005, he was scouted by Belgian club Anderlecht and signed a three-year contract with the club. After spending months at the club's reserve, he made his debut for Anderlecht in a Belgian Cup match which they lost to Geel after Tioté missed his penalty. The following month, Tioté made his UEFA Champions League debut, where he made his first start in Matchday 6 Group Stage, in a 1–0 loss against Real Betis. It was not until 18 March 2006 that he made his league debut for the club, coming on as a late substitute, in a 4–0 win over Beveren. After making another league appearance, Tioté went on to make four appearances in all competitions in the 2005–06 season. The following season saw Tioté make three appearances in all competitions, due to spending most of the season with injuries.

In the 2007–08 season, he played on loan for Roda JC on a season-long loan deal, where he played alongside his countryman Sekou Cissé. After making his first start on his Roda JC debut, in a 5–3 win over VVV-Venlo on 2 September 2007, he scored his first goal for the club, in a 3–1 loss against Feyenoord. Since making an impact at Roda JC, he became the club's fan favourite there. On 27 December 2007 he scored his second Roda JC goal, in a 1–0 win over Heerenveen. On 4 April 2008, however, Tioté was sent off in the 33rd minute, in a 2–0 loss against NEC, which turns out to be his last appearance. After serving two match suspension for the rest of the season, he went on to make thirty appearances and scoring two times in all competitions.

=== Twente ===
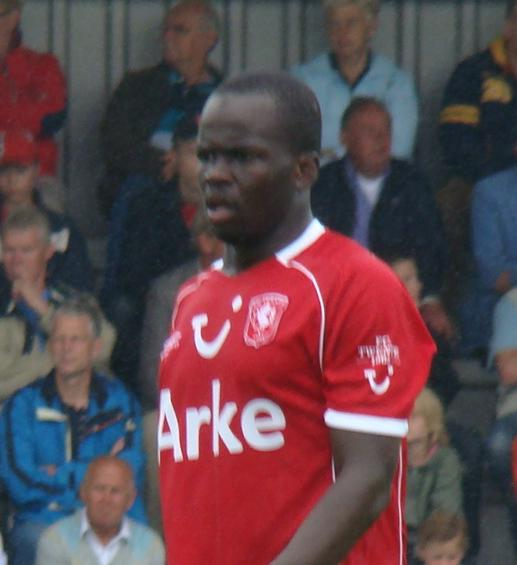
Tioté playing for Twente in 2008

At the end of the season, Roda JC expressed interest in signing Tioté, along with Cercle Brugge. Eventually, on 12 June 2008, Tioté signed for Dutch Eredivisie side Twente for a fee reported to be around €750,000, signing a four-year contract, with an option for another year. Upon joining the club, Tioté said he doubted of having first team football at Anderlecht should he have stayed.

Tioté made his competitive debut for the club on 13 August 2008, in a UEFA Champions League qualification round, in a 2–0 loss against Arsenal. Weeks later, on 30 August 2008, he made his league debut, making his first start, in a 1–1 draw against Roda JC in the opening game of the season. However, in a match against Feyenoord on 18 April 2009, he was sent off after a second bookable offence, which saw Twente lose 1–0. After returning to the first team from suspension, Tioté played the whole game in the final of KNVB Cup against Heerenveen, but lost out in the penalty-shootout after the game played 120 minutes, drawing 2–2. Despite this, Tioté established himself in the first team in his first season, as he made forty-one appearances in all competitions.

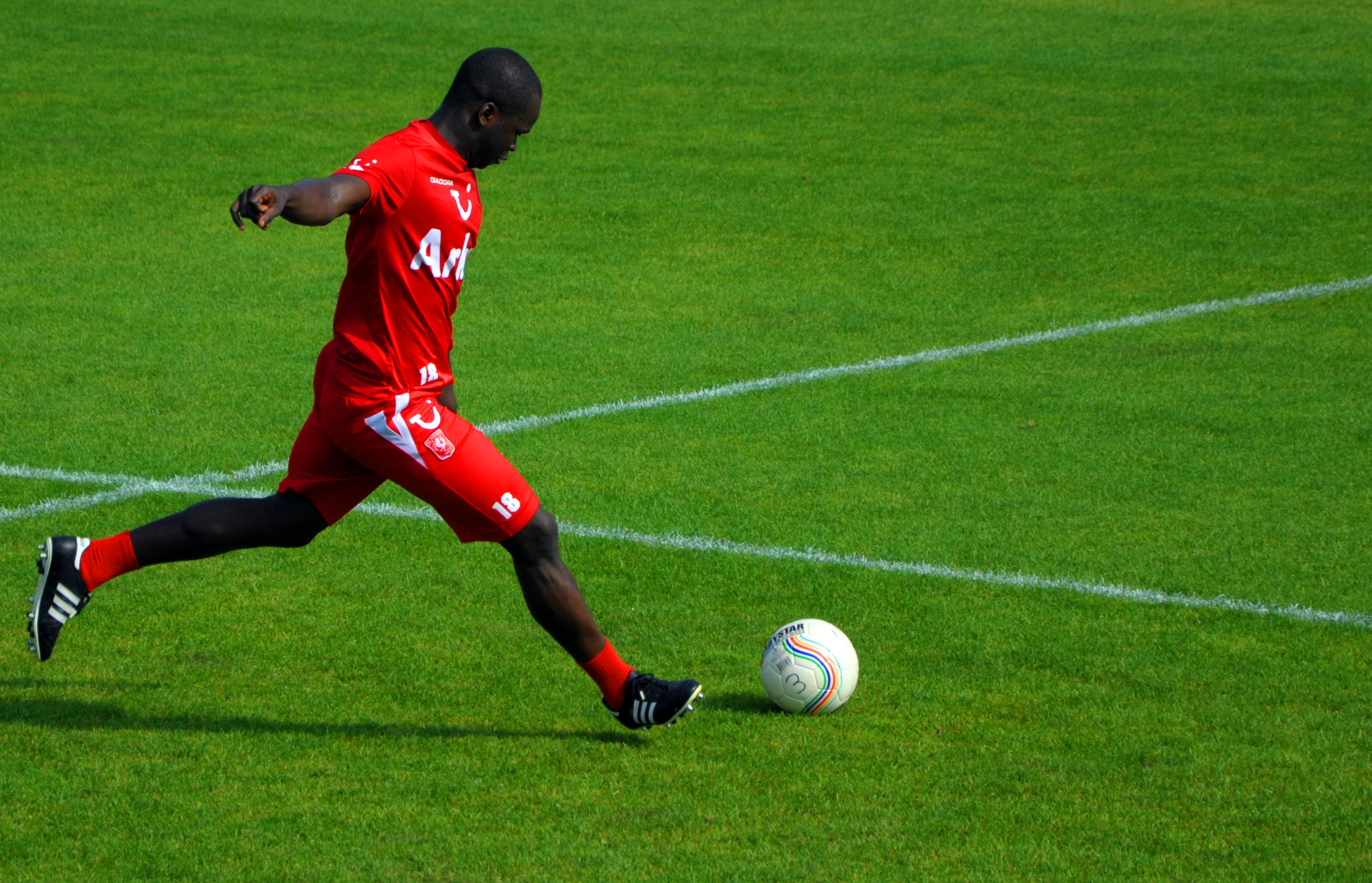
Tioté playing for Twente in 2009

Ahead of his second season at the club, Tioté was linked a move away from Twente, with French clubs expressing interest in signing him. After staying at the club throughout the summer, Tioté continued to be a first team regular and was sent-off on 20 September 2009, in a 3–2 win over Utrecht after a second bookable offence. On 10 April 2010, Tioté then scored his first goal for Twente, in a 2–0 win over Heerenveen. After receiving a yellow card during a 1–0 loss against AZ Alkmaar on 13 April 2010, Tioté served a one match suspension for this. Tioté made his return from suspension in the last game of the season, coming on as a second-half substitute, in a 2–0 win over NAC Breda to win the club's first ever league title. He also featured in the Europa League and Champions League, as he made forty-two appearances and scoring once in all competitions.

During his two years time at Twente, he gained his reputation for being a determined and resilient midfielder with a keen eye for a pass, making fifty-eight league appearances scoring one goal with fourteen assists. Following his performance in the World Cup, Tioté further attracted interests from clubs, including Birmingham City, but newly appointed manager Michel Preud'homme insisted on keeping him at the club. In the 2010–11 season, he went on to make two appearances, before signing for Newcastle United.

=== Newcastle United ===
On 26 August 2010, Tioté joined English Premier League side Newcastle United for a fee of £3.5 million, after he was granted a work permit. Upon joining the club, Tioté spoke to the local newspaper, the Evening Chronicle, about the move, saying: "It's a great thrill for me to be joining such a famous club as Newcastle United." He was given the number 24 shirt.

He made his debut on 18 September against Everton at Goodison Park. He completed all of his 64 passes, made two interceptions, completed all five of his attempted tackles, and his only shot was on target. Tioté quickly became a favourite among supporters. On 8 January 2011, he was sent off during Newcastle's third round FA Cup match against Stevenage. Newcastle attempted to appeal the decision, but the FA decided to uphold it, and Tioté was suspended for three matches. On 5 February, Tioté scored his first and what was to be his only goal for the club, a 25-yard volley for the late equaliser in a 4–4 draw against Arsenal after Newcastle had trailed 4–0 at half time. On 25 February 2011, Newcastle announced that Tioté had signed a new six-and-a-half-year contract to show his commitment to the club, keeping him at Newcastle until 2017. Upon signing his new deal, Tioté said: "The experience of playing in the Premier League has been better than I ever hoped it could be. This is a great club and the fans have been brilliant – I have never known support like it." Despite setback from suspensions, he made 28 appearances and scored once in all competitions.

In the 2011–12 season, Tioté started the season well for the club when he set up two goals in two matches between 17 and 24 September 2011, against Aston Villa and Blackburn Rovers, which resulted in a draw and a win respectively. However, during a 1–0 win over Wigan Athletic on 22 October, he suffered a broken nose and knee injury that resulted him out for two months. He returned on 17 December, playing 82 minutes before being substituted in a 0–0 draw against Swansea City. After the end of the African Cup of Nations, Tioté returned to the first team, where he set up one of the goals, in a 2–2 draw against Wolverhampton Wanderers on 25 February 2012. As the 2011–12 season progressed, he went on to make 24 appearances in all competitions.

After two seasons at Newcastle, Tioté picked up 25 yellow cards from 50 league games, a return of one yellow card every two games, but only received one sending off, against local rivals Sunderland. He was sent off in Newcastle's 1–1 draw at the Stadium of Light on 21 October 2012, for a late challenge on Steven Fletcher. In a 1–0 win against Queens Park Rangers on 22 December, Tioté received a yellow card, picking up his fifth booking of the season and resulting in him being suspended for one match. However, throughout the 2012–13 season, Tioté suffered a setback, due to international commitment on two occasions and injury. Despite this, he went on to make 31 appearances in all competitions in the 2012–13 season.

In the 2013–14 season, Tioté captained Newcastle for the first time, replacing Fabricio Coloccini and Yohan Cabaye, both ruled out by injury, and performed well in a 2–2 draw on 19 October 2013. Following the match, his role as captain was praised by manager Alan Pardew, who wanted him to captain another match. On 12 January 2014, and with Newcastle trailing 1–0 at home to Manchester City, Tioté had a goal controversially disallowed, when referee Mike Jones ruled that Yoan Gouffran had blocked the goalkeeper's view from an offside position, and pundits criticised the decision to disallow the goal. Later that month, Cabaye left the club to join Paris Saint-Germain, thus disrupting the successful partnership between the two men. As a result, his form suffered, with replacement Dan Gosling not up to the preferred standard. However, Tioté was given the captain's armband in the absence of Coloccini, who had suffered a knee injury against West Bromwich Albion. By the end of the 2013–14 season, Tioté had made 36 appearances in all competitions.

A hamstring injury meant that Tioté started the following season later than his teammates; it would be in September that he finally made his first appearance, against Hull City, in which he set up one of the goals, in a 2–2 draw. He would go on to make eleven more appearances in the league, before going on international duty for the 2015 African Cup of Nations. He sustained a knee injury, and had to have surgery on it, ruling him out for the rest of the season. This came as a blow for the player; he had stated to Ivorian press that he wanted to leave Newcastle. He had been previously linked with Arsenal and Manchester United, and admitted there had been contacts for him from Arsenal and an unnamed Russian club.

In the 2015–16 season, Tioté made 20 league appearances, firstly under Steve McClaren, and then under Rafael Benítez. Despite this, he could not displace the midfield pairing of Moussa Sissoko and Georginio Wijnaldum, and often played in positions not suited to him. On 6 February 2016, against West Bromwich Albion, Tioté had another goal disallowed in similar circumstances to the one two years earlier. This time, referee Lee Mason ruled that Aleksandar Mitrović had blocked the goalkeeper's view from an offside position, but the decision did not cost the team, as Mitrović would score the winner a few minutes later. The following summer saw Tioté linked with moves to Turkey and China, but nothing came to fruition. Benítez decided to keep him on as a squad player, and he fell further down the pecking order with Jonjo Shelvey, Jack Colback and Isaac Hayden all starting ahead of him. He made three more appearances for the club – once in the league, in a 1–1 draw with Aston Villa, and twice in the FA Cup, in both third round ties against Birmingham City.

=== Beijing Enterprises Group ===
On 9 February 2017, Tioté joined China League One side Beijing Enterprises Group for an undisclosed fee. Tioté made his Beijing Enterprises Group debut, in the opening game of the season, playing the whole game, in a 2–1 loss against Qingdao Huanghai. He appeared in 11 of 12 matches for the club until his last match on 3 June against Baoding Yingli ETS with a 4–2 win.

== International career ==
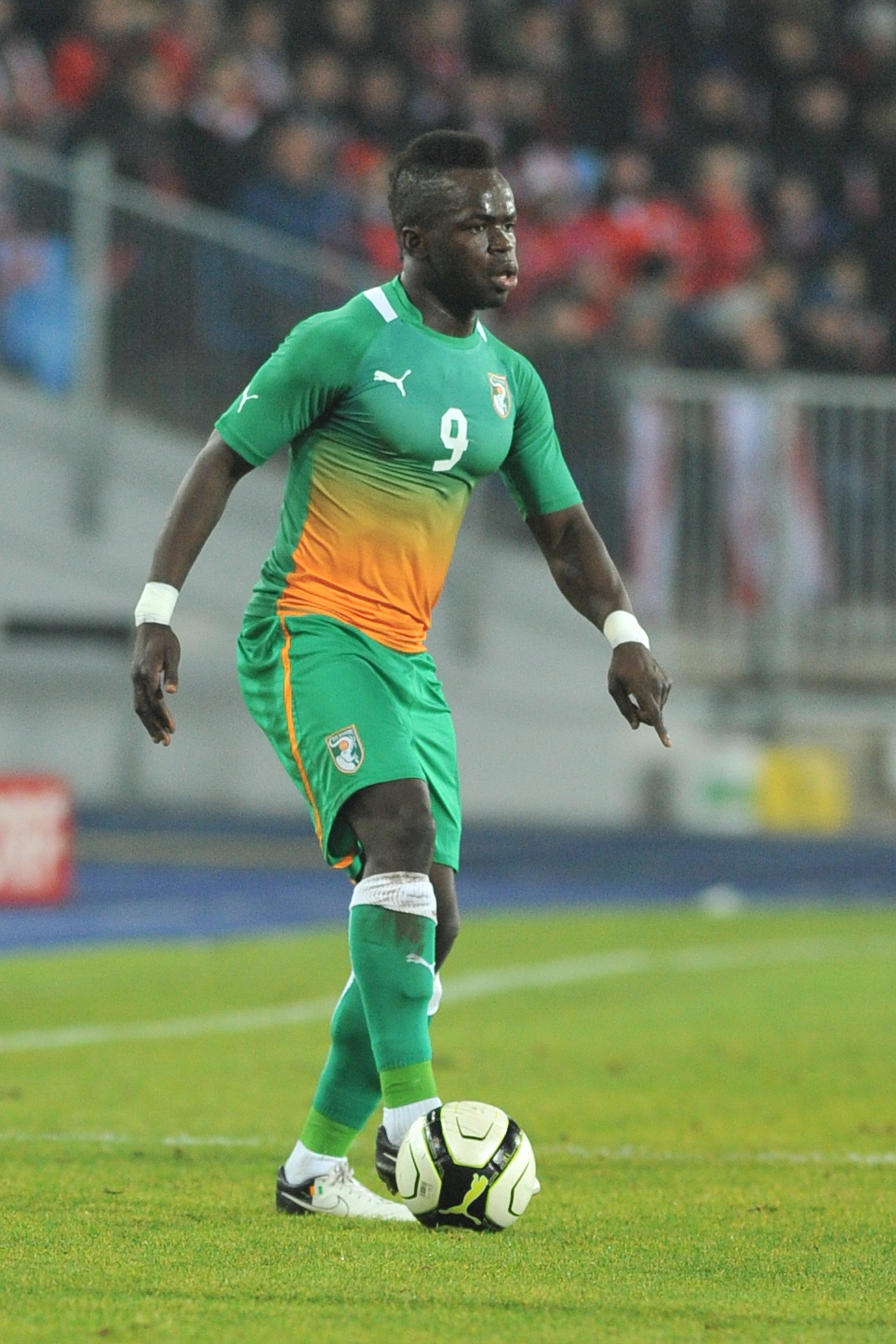
Tioté playing for the Ivory Coast in 2012

On 23 March 2009, Tioté was called up for the first time by the Ivory Coast, but did not play. After being called up once more in May, he made his international debut on 12 August in a friendly match against Tunisia. He was selected in the Ivory Coast's squad for the 2010 Africa Cup of Nations squad and given the squad number 9.

He started in all three of Les Éléphants' matches before their quarter final elimination by Algeria. Tioté also started each of the Ivory Coast's 2010 FIFA World Cup matches in South Africa, but the team did not advance to the second round. During one of the match against Brazil, Tioté was involved in a challenge with Elano that saw him suffer an injury and sidelined for the rest of the tournament.

On 13 January 2012, Tioté was sent off for a "crazy challenge" in a 2012 Africa Cup of Nations warm up match against Tunisia. However, he was in the starting line-up for the Ivory Coast's opening two group matches and both the semi-final and final, in which he scored the team's first kick in the penalty shootout defeat to Zambia. Following the end of the tournament, Tioté revealed that he gave away his medal to his friend because of the loss.

At the 2013 Africa Cup of Nations, Tioté scored his first international goal in the 50th minute of their 2–1 quarter-final loss to Nigeria. At the 2014 FIFA World Cup, Tioté featured in all three matches in the group stage.

At the 2015 Africa Cup of Nations, Tioté started in the first two group matches. He injured his ankle in the match against Mali, which ended his involvement in the tournament that the Ivory Coast went on to on to win.

== Personal life ==
Tioté was a devout Muslim. He observed fasting during the Islamic month of Ramadan.

In May 2011, Tioté's car was seized by the police for motoring offences. On 13 February 2013, he was arrested on suspicion of fraud, and had his car seized by the police. After admitting to possessing a forged Belgian driving licence, he was given a suspended sentence, as well as a six-month ban from driving.

In 2012, after Newcastle United announced their sponsorship deal with Wonga, Tioté, alongside his teammates Papiss Cissé, Hatem Ben Arfa and Demba Ba, initially refused to wear the new sponsor's name on their shirts. As Wonga was a payday loan firm, according to Sharia law, Muslims must not benefit from either lending money or receiving money from another person – meaning that charging interest is prohibited. The matter was settled the following season.

He had two children with his first wife, Madah. During his time at Newcastle, the couple lived in the village of Ponteland in Northumberland, and were married some time before his move to Tyneside. On 29 September 2014, it was reported by the Evening Chronicle that Tioté had married a second wife, Laeticia Doukrou, in the capital of the Ivory Coast, Abidjan. The marriage had taken place before the start of the season. His agent Jean Musampa, confirmed the marriage to the local newspaper, saying "I can say that he did get married and that it is his second marriage." Shortly afterwards, it was reported that his mistress Nkosiphile Mpofu, with whom he had a child, had ended their relationship.

== Death ==
On 5 June 2017, Tioté died in Beijing, China, after suffering a cardiac arrest in training. Demba Ba was amongst the first to pay tribute to the Ivorian via social media, and soon afterwards, many of his former Newcastle teammates followed suit. His former managers were similarly effusive with praise: Rafael Benítez labelled him "a true professional", Alan Pardew described him as "everything that you want in a Newcastle player", Steve McClaren (who had managed him at both Twente and Newcastle) remembered him as the toughest player he had ever seen, and Chris Hughton (who had brought him to Newcastle) spoke of his humility and called him "the perfect fit".

On 13 June, Tioté's memorial service was held in Beijing, which was attended by his Beijing Enterprises Group teammates and Papiss Cissé, who had played with him at Newcastle. On 15 June, his body was flown back to the Ivory Coast for a private funeral, amidst a dispute between his family and the Ivory Coast Football Federation over the location of his burial. He was given a military funeral in Abidjan on 18 June, attended by his national teammates and politicians including prime minister Amadou Gon Coulibaly. Beijing Enterprises Group retired Tioté's number 24 shirt on 24 June.

== Career statistics ==
=== Club ===
Appearances and goals by club, season and competition
Club	Season	League			National Cup (Note: Includes Belgian Cup, KNVB Cup, FA Cup, Chinese FA Cup.)		League Cup (Note: Includes League Cup.)		Continental		Total	
Club	Season	Division	Apps	Goals	Apps	Goals	Apps	Goals	Apps	Goals	Apps	Goals
Anderlecht	2005–06	Belgian First Division	2	0	1	0	—		1 (Note: Appearance(s) in the UEFA Champions League.)	0	4	0
Anderlecht	2006–07	Belgian First Division	2	0	0	0	—		0	0	2	0
Anderlecht	Total		4	0	1	0	—		1	0	6	0
Roda JC (loan)	2007–08	Eredivisie	26	2	0	0	—		—		26	2
Twente	2008–09	Eredivisie	28	0	3	0	—		10 (Note: Two appearances in the UEFA Champions League, eight appearances in the UEFA Cup.)	0	41	0
Twente	2009–10	Eredivisie	28	1	3	0	—		12 (Note: Two appearances in the UEFA Champions League, ten appearances in the UEFA Europa League.)	0	43	1
Twente	2010–11	Eredivisie	2	0	0	0	—		0	0	2	0
Twente	Total		58	1	6	0	—		22	0	86	1
Newcastle United	2010–11	Premier League	26	1	1	0	1	0	—		28	1
Newcastle United	2011–12	Premier League	24	0	0	0	0	0	—		24	0
Newcastle United	2012–13	Premier League	24	0	0	0	1	0	6 (Note: Appearances in the UEFA Europa League.)	0	31	0
Newcastle United	2013–14	Premier League	33	0	1	0	2	0	—		36	0
Newcastle United	2014–15	Premier League	11	0	1	0	0	0	—		12	0
Newcastle United	2015–16	Premier League	20	0	1	0	1	0	—		22	0
Newcastle United	2016–17	Championship	1	0	2	0	0	0	—		3	0
Newcastle United	Total		139	1	6	0	5	0	6	0	156	1
Beijing Enterprises Group	2017	China League One	11	0	0	0	—		—		11	0
Career total			238	4	13	0	5	0	29	0	285	4

=== International ===
Appearances and goals by national team and year
National team	Year	Apps	Goals
Ivory Coast	2009	3	0
Ivory Coast	2010	15	0
Ivory Coast	2011	4	0
Ivory Coast	2012	11	0
Ivory Coast	2013	8	1
Ivory Coast	2014	10	0
Ivory Coast	2015	4	0
Total		55	1

Scores and results list Ivory Coast's goal tally first, score column indicates score after each Tioté goal.

List of international goals scored by Cheick Tioté
No.	Date	Venue	Opponent	Score	Result	Competition
1	3 February 2013	Royal Bafokeng Stadium, Rustenburg, South Africa	Nigeria	1–1	1–2	2013 Africa Cup of Nations

== Honours ==
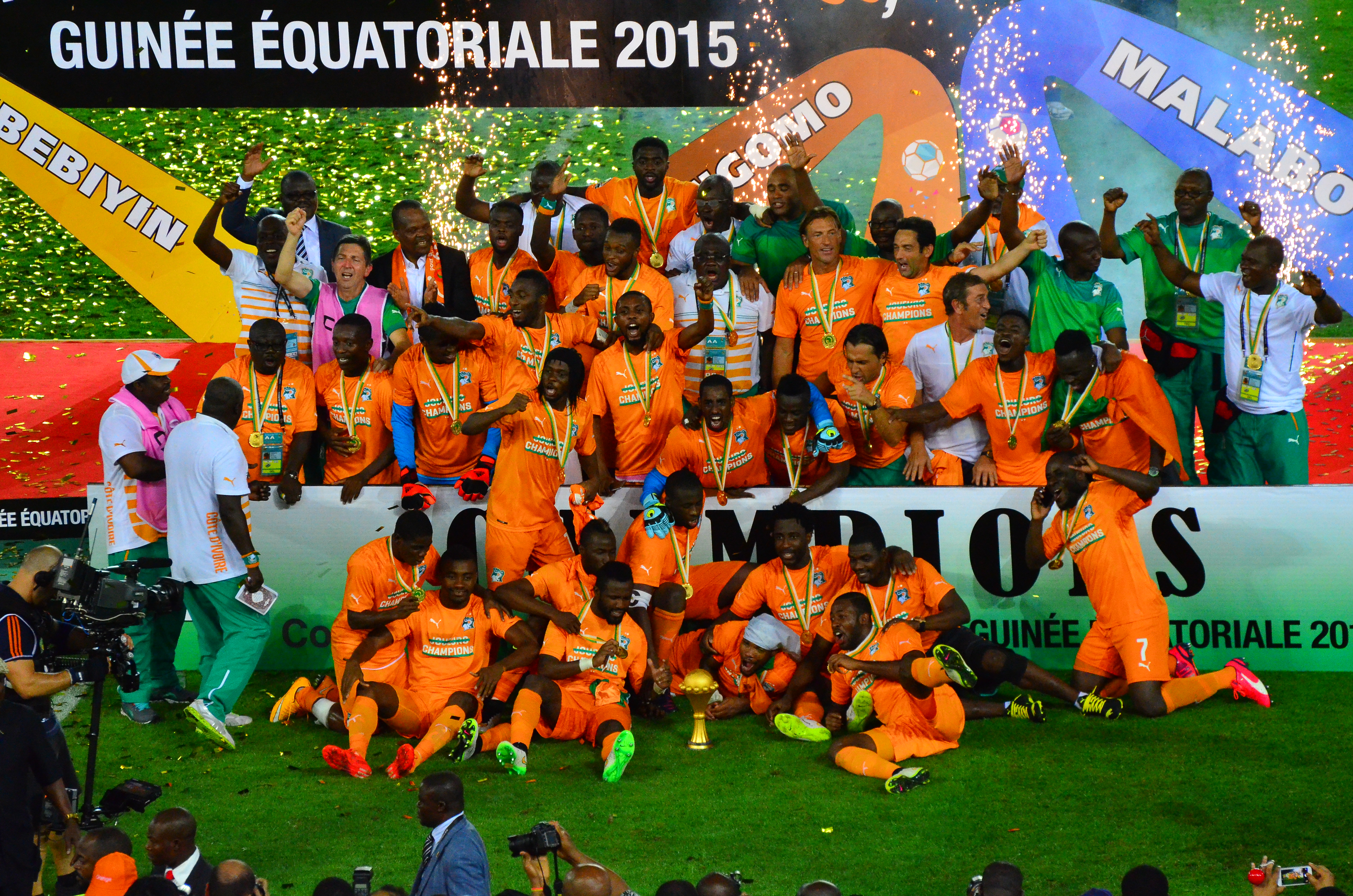
Tioté, standing next to Serge Aurier, celebrates winning the 2015 Africa Cup of Nations with the Ivory Coast national team

Anderlecht

- Belgian League: 2005–06, 2006–07
- Belgian Super Cup: 2006

Twente

- Eredivisie: 2009–10
- Dutch Super Cup: 2010

Ivory Coast

- Africa Cup of Nations: 2015
