= Michael Gavin =

American soccer player (born 1986)

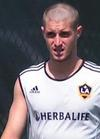
- Gavin with the LA Galaxy in 2008

Personal information
- Full name: Michael Gavin
- Date of birth: March 30, 1986 (age 40)
- Place of birth: Scottsdale, Arizona, U.S.
- Height: 5 ft 10 in (1.78 m)
- Position: Defender

Youth career
- 1997–2004: Sereno SC Golden Eagles '86
- 2000–2004: Horizon High School

College career
Years	Team	Apps	(Gls)
2004–2007	Portland Pilots	75	(4)

Senior career*
Years	Team	Apps	(Gls)
2006–2007	Bradenton Academics	26	(1)
2008	Los Angeles Galaxy	2	(0)

International career
2008	United States U23	0	(0)
- * Club domestic league appearances and goals as of 8 April 2009

Michael Gavin (born March 30, 1986) is an American former professional soccer player who featured for his teams as a left wing-back.

== Career ==
=== Youth Levels ===
Gavin served as captain of the '86 Sereno Golden Eagles, which featured future Major League Soccer players Brandon McDonald, Robbie Findley, Rob Valentino, as well as future NCAA players Joey Vitagliano, Andrew Antila, Cody Russell, Kegan Riley, and Jordan Demos.

Gavin's Sereno squad were highly successful, registering eight Arizona state championships (1997-2004), four Far West Region IV championships (2001-2004), three US Youth Soccer National Championships Final Four finishes (2001-2002, 2004), as well as a national runners-up finish (2003). During this period, Gavin found form as an attacking threat at the state and national levels, and represented the Arizona State Olympic Development Team in Far West Region IV competitions from 1998 to 2003.

Gavin simultaneously attended Horizon High School in Scottsdale, Arizona, and in his lone year playing prep soccer he won the 2003 State Championship. He was named Horizon's Defensive Player of the Year, chosen as an all-Region first-team performer, and was a 5A all-State selection by The Arizona Republic newspaper.

Gavin concluded his youth career in 2004 by signing a National Letter of Intent to play at the University of Portland.

=== College ===
Gavin went on to represent Portland Pilots men's soccer from 2004 to 2007. Gavin opened his college career by being named the West Coast Conference Freshman of the Year and an all-Conference selection in 2004. During his tenure, Gavin started 71 of his 75 appearances as the Pilots were ranked in the Top 25 by the United Soccer Coaches, TopDrawerSoccer, Soccer America, and College Soccer News. His collegiate career culminated in earning the captaincy for his side, developing a knack for scoring crucial late goals, being named to conference and national Teams of the Week by various publications, receiving all-Conference honors, and being named the Pilots' Most Inspirational Player.

While Gavin demonstrated himself to be a threat by scoring four goals himself and assisting on four others, professional scouts were drawn to Gavin's defensive prowess, as he was only shown 3 yellow cards during his college career and never sent off.

=== Professional ===
After Gavin spent two years with the Bradenton Academics of the USL Premier Development League, he was selected by the Los Angeles Galaxy as the 4th overall pick in the 2008 MLS Supplemental Draft, and started the 2008 season as the team's first-choice left back. However, after he departed for a national team call-up, he was dropped from the Starting XI. Gavin was reduced to a place on the bench as an unused substitute for the remainder of the season while the 2008 Galaxy side struggled to find consistent performance and leadership - the team were knocked out of the 2008 U.S. Open Cup, suffered a last place finish in the league, cycled through three different managers, and also changed sporting directors.

After Gavin began the 2009 season with the Galaxy, Bruce Arena overhauled his player personnel in favor of more experience, which ultimately left Gavin outside of the club's final 24-man roster for that season.

=== International career ===
Gavin was chosen to represent the United States U-23 National Team in the 2008 Toulon Tournament (now known as the Maurice Revello Tournament).

== Personal ==
Michael is the older brother of midfielder Blair Gavin. He resides with his wife and 3 children in Vernal, Utah.
