= FC Bibo =

Ivorian football club

FC Bibó
- Full name: F.C. Kossou Bibó
- Nickname: Bibó
- Founded: 15 October 1951
- Ground: Bibó Athletic Club, Kossou, Yamoussoukro
- Capacity: 1,450
Home colours	Away colours	Third colours

F.C. Kossou Bibó, or commonly known as F.C. Bibó is an Ivorian semi-professional football team based in Kossou, Yamoussoukro, Ivory Coast. Some noteworthy players have come through the academy including Sekou Cissé, Bassilia Sakanoko, Leoh Digbeu and Cheick Tioté.
