= Eren Güngör =

Turkish footballer

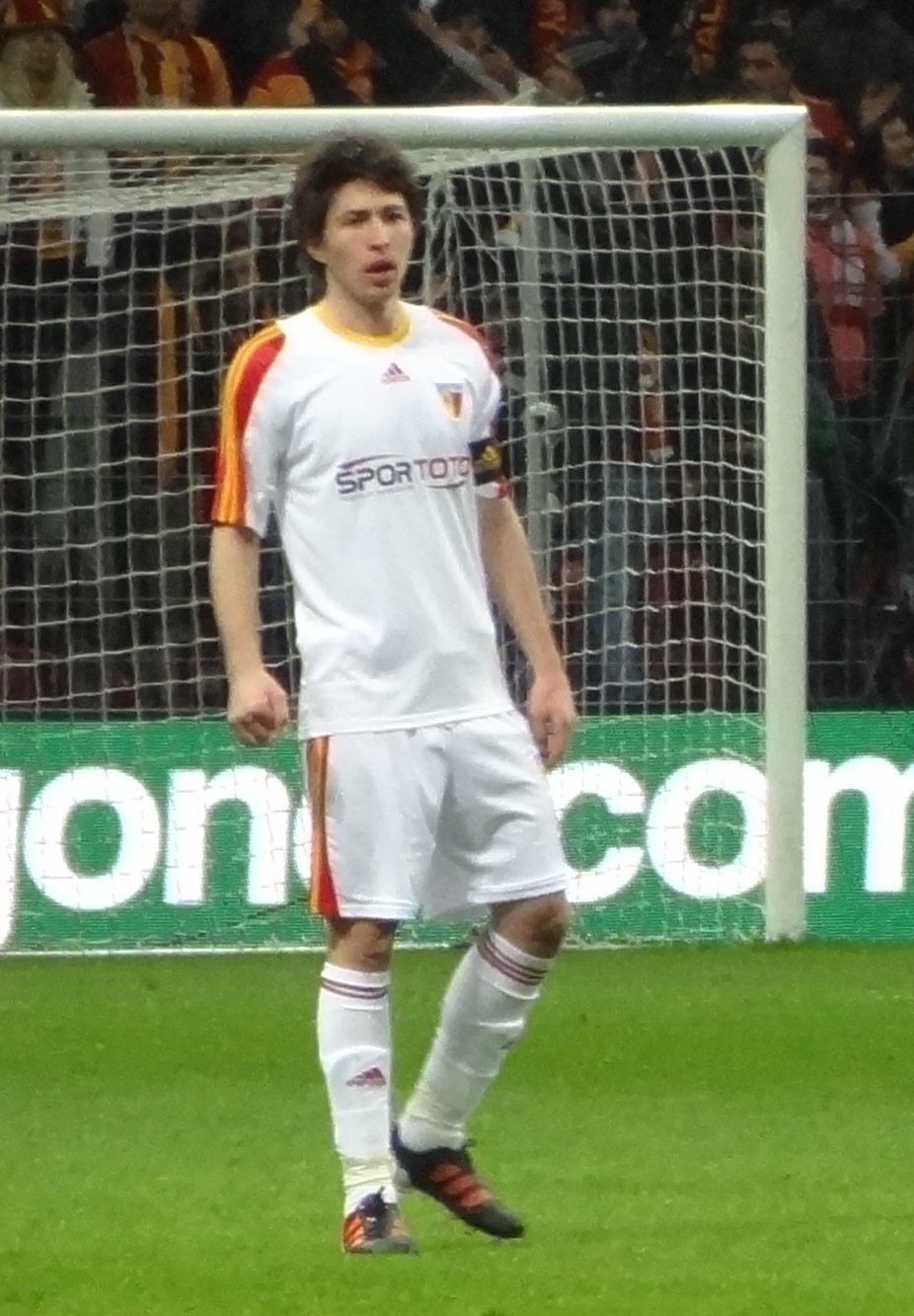

Personal information
- Date of birth: April 2, 1988 (age 38)
- Place of birth: Bergama, İzmir, Turkey
- Height: 1.87 m (6 ft 1 1/2 in)
- Position: Central defender

Youth career
- 1999–2004: Çamdibigücü

Senior career*
Years	Team	Apps	(Gls)
2004–2007	Altay	42	(3)
2008–2013	Kayserispor	85	(2)
2013–2015	Karabükspor	0	(0)

International career
2005	Turkey U17	2	(0)
2005–2006	Turkey U18	4	(0)
2006	Turkey U19	4	(0)
2007–2008	Turkey U21	11	(3)
2008–2009	Turkey	3	(0)
- * Club domestic league appearances and goals

Eren Güngör (born 2 April 1988) is a Turkish former footballer. He plays as a central defender or a left-back.

== Club career ==
Eren started his career playing for his local side Çamdibigücü, before moving to professional side Altay at the age of 14. He stayed with the first division club until the age of 19, when he signed a four-year contract with Süper Lig side Kayserispor.

== International career ==
Eren appeared for the Turkish side in the 2008 Toulon Tournament, scoring a goal in Turkey's 3–2 victory over the United States. Turkey, however, would not advance to the next round, finishing third in the group behind Italy and Ivory Coast.

Eren made his debut with the Turkey national team on 19 November 2008 in a friendly against Austria. Fatih Terim, the Turkey manager, selected him due to his outstanding form with his club, which saw Kayserispor concede six goals, in the three months since the beginning of the season in August 2008. He currently has five caps with the senior squad.
