= Jean-Christophe Cesto =

French association football player (born 1987)

Personal information
- Date of birth: 24 January 1987 (age 39)
- Place of birth: France
- Position: Defender

Senior career*
Years	Team	Apps	(Gls)
-2006/07	FC Nantes	0	(0)
2006/2007	Athlético Marseille	4	(0)
2007-2008	SC Bastia	1	(0)
2008-2009	Toulouse Rodéo FC	26	(2)
2010-2011	US Pontet Grand Avignon 84	30	(0)
2011/2012	SU Agen Football	15	(0)
2012-2016	SO Cholet	61	(1)
2017-2018	Football Club Challans	20	(0)
- * Club domestic league appearances and goals

Jean-Christophe Cesto (born 24 January 1987) is a French retired footballer.
