= Damien Bridonneau =

French footballer (born 1975)

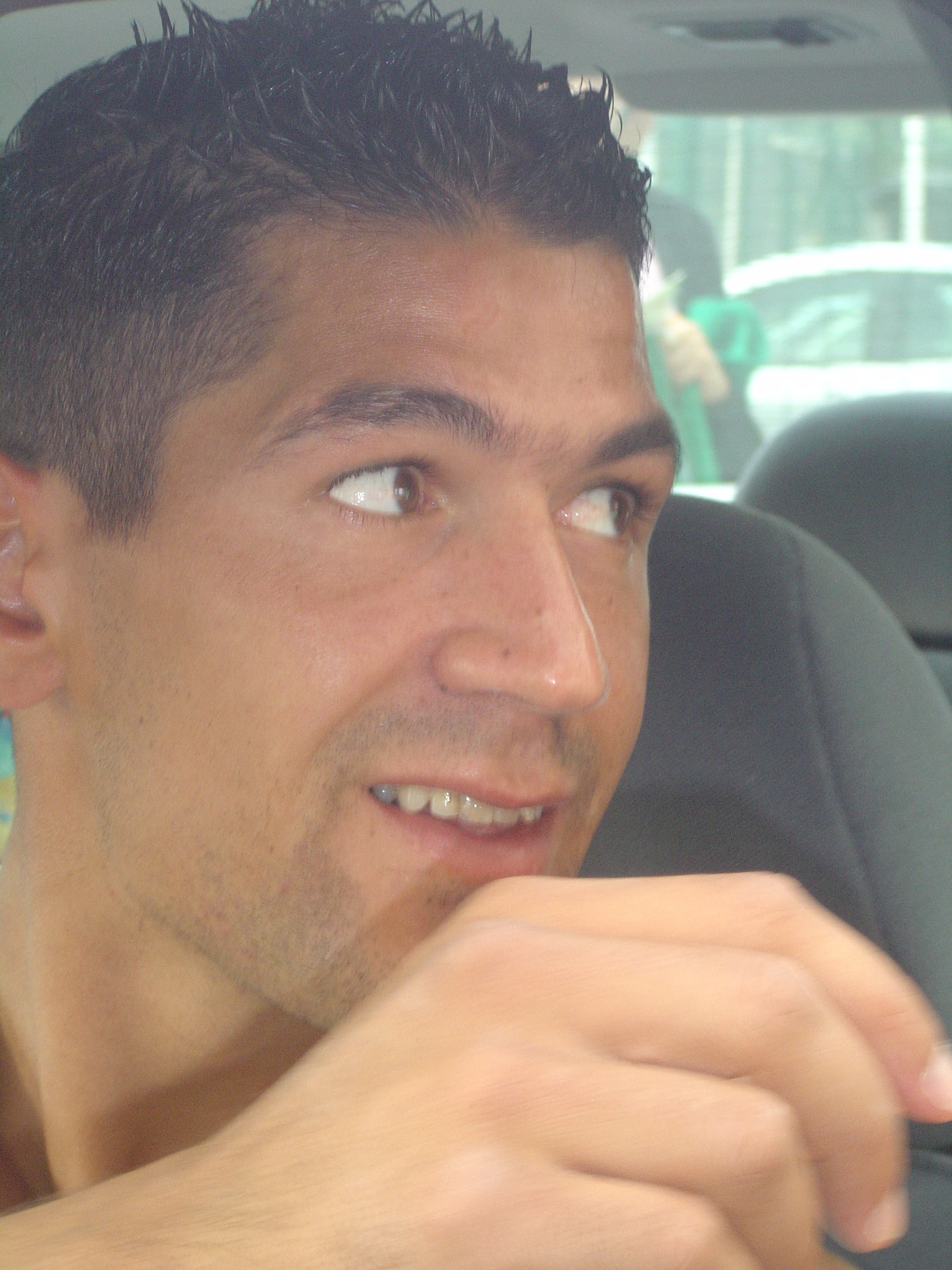
- Damien Bridonneau in 2004

Personal information
- Full name: Damien Bridonneau
- Date of birth: April 19, 1975 (age 51)
- Place of birth: Niort, France
- Height: 1.73 m (5 ft 8 in)
- Position: Defender

Senior career*
Years	Team	Apps	(Gls)
1993–2000	Chamois Niortais	133	(3)
2000–2003	Le Mans	76	(3)
2003–2004	Saint-Étienne	30	(1)
2004–2006	Guingamp	66	(0)
2006–2008	Bastia	65	(0)
2008–2010	Vannes	6	(0)
2012–2014	Chauray	?	(?)
- * Club domestic league appearances and goals as of 18:41, 13 December 2015 (UTC)

Damien Bridonneau (born April 19, 1975) is a professional footballer currently playing for Ligue 2 club Vannes OC. He plays as a defender.
