= Horizon High School (Scottsdale, Arizona) =

Secondary school in Maricopa County

Location
- 5601 East Greenway Road; Scottsdale, Arizona 85254; United States; 33°37′30″N 111°57′30″W

Information
- Type: Public high school
- Established: 1980
- School district: Paradise Valley Unified School District
- NCES District ID: 0405930
- CEEB code: 030401
- NCES School ID: 040593001084
- Principal: Shelley Strohfus
- Teaching staff: 76.90 (on an FTE basis)
- Grades: 9–12
- Enrollment: 1,863 (2023–2024)
- Student to teacher ratio: 24.23
- Colors: Green and gold
- Slogan: PCR (Pride, Courage, Respect)
- Nickname: Huskies
- Feeder schools: Desert Shadows Middle School (all), Sunrise Middle School (partial)
- Website: Official website

Horizon High School is a public high school in Scottsdale, Arizona in the Paradise Valley Unified School District.

The school was established in 1980. The current principal is Jennifer Jeras. About 1,800 students are enrolled in the school. The mascot is a Husky.

== History ==
In 1978 the Paradise Valley Unified School District commissioned the Architecture Firm of Michael and Kemper Goodwin Ltd. to design the new six-building campus. Construction began the following year and was undertaken by the Del E. Webb Corporation and was nearly completed when the school opened in August 1980. The school's Auditorium was constructed in 1983. Additional new classroom buildings were constructed in 2003 and 2008.

== Extracurricular activities ==
=== Choir ===
The Horizon High School Choir has about 400 students in the program. The different choirs include Women's Ensemble, Low Frequency, Show Divas, Towne Criers, Step On Stage, Decibelles, and Ensemble.

=== Athletics ===
In February 2003, the men's soccer team won the 5A State Championship.

In May 2019, the men's baseball team won the 5A State Championship.

In October 2021, the women's volleyball team placed second in the Nike Tournament of Champions.

The Horizon football team won the 2021 state championship. The football program has 2 titles 1994, and 2021 with a runner up appearance in 1995.

The Horizon girls' volleyball team won the 2021, 2022, 2023, and 2024 5A state championships.

The Horizon Spiritline Pom Team won the 2022-2023 state title.

=== Marching Band ===
Under the direction of Kyle Hollerbach, the Horizon Pride Regiment has been a member of the AzMBA since 2016.

Shows and Scorings
Show	Division	Year	Score
Grow	1A	2016-2017	74.7
The Flight	1A	2017-2018	74.05
Playback	1A	2018-2019	73.95
Pride	1A	2019-2020	69.53
A Moment Captured	2A	2021-2022	78.8
A Genie's Wish	2A	2022-2023	86.6
Reflect	2A	2023-2024	83.85

== Notable alumni (alphabetical order) ==
- Max Adler, actor.
- Jayson Durocher, former MLB player (Milwaukee Brewers).
- Tim Esmay, baseball coach
- Blair Gavin, former MLS Player for Chivas USA, New England Revolution, and Seattle Sounders FC.
- Michael Gavin, former MLS Player for LA Galaxy.
- Tuffy Gosewisch, MLB player (Seattle Mariners).
- Garrett Hedlund, actor, model and singer.
- Tommy Joseph, MLB player (Philadelphia Phillies).
- Sydney Leroux, soccer player and member of the United States women's national soccer team.
- Jeff Lewis, football player for Denver Broncos and Carolina Panthers; Northern Arizona University football coach.
- Kellan Lutz, actor.
- Cody McKay, former MLB player (Oakland Athletics, St. Louis Cardinals).
- Grace Park, former professional golfer, six-time LPGA winner.
- Ty Parten, former NFL football player.
- Rob Waldrop, former NFL and CFL football player.
- Jim Walmsley, ultra-marathon runner.
- Spenser Watkins, former MLB player, CPBL player (TSG Hawks)
- Brandon Wood, MLB player (Los Angeles Angels, Pittsburgh Pirates).
