= Bassilia Sakanoko =

Ivorian footballer (born 1985)

Bassalia Sakanoko
Personal information
- Full name: Bassalia Sakanoko
- Date of birth: 3 June 1985 (age 41)
- Place of birth: Abidjan, Ivory Coast
- Height: 1.82 m (6 ft 0 in)
- Position: Forward

Team information
- Current team: Nechin

Youth career
- 1995–2003: FC Bibo
- 2003–2005: Anderlecht

Senior career*
Years	Team	Apps	(Gls)
2005–2006	WS Woluwe	17	(1)
2006–2007	Gent	1	(0)
2006–2007	→ Oostende (loan)	29	(5)
2007–2008	Peruwelz	27	(10)
2008–2009	Mouscron	21	(1)
2009–2010	OH Leuven	27	(1)
2010–2011	WS Woluwe	9	(1)
2010	→ Lokomotiv Plovdiv (loan)	5	(0)
2011–2014	Ath	43	(2)
2014–2019	Deux Acren		
2019–2020	Warcoing		
2020–2021	Galmaarden		
2021–2022	Bever		
2022–2023	RUS Tournai		
2023–	Nechin		
- * Club domestic league appearances and goals as of 27 December 2012

Bassalia Sakanoko (born 3 June 1985) is an Ivorian footballer, who plays as a forward for Nechin in the Belgian Provincial Leagues.

== Club career ==
Born in Abidjan, Sakanoko played street football and futsal, until he joined semi-professional Ivorian team FC Bibo before going to Belgium for his first stint at WS Woluwe, where he made 17 appearances, scoring one goal. He spent the following year at K.V. Oostende after being signed, and sent straight out on loan by Gent, scoring five goals in 29 appearances.

=== Peruwelz ===
On 18 January 2007, Sakanoko signed for Peruwelz for a fee of €70,000. He became a first team regular for the rest of the season, after scoring a hat-trick in his first game including a 25-yard curling effort in the 90th minute to make Peruwelz win against Belgian Pro League leaders Anderlecht 3–2 in the cup.

=== Mouscron ===
In September 2008, he moved to Mouscron for an inflated fee of €500,000, earning himself a reputation for being able to beat players on the turn and hold the ball up with his speed and strength.

=== Oud-Heverlee Leuven ===
On 5 August 2009, Sakanoko made a much anticipated yet controversial move to rivals R.E. Mouscron for fee of €2 million with additional fees if he makes a number of appearances and a 20% sell on fee. This was the first club where he started to play a wider role, usually playing on the left wing, making 31 league appearances, twelve assists and four goal.

=== Return to WS Woluwe ===
He returned to WS Woluwe in 2010 for an undisclosed fee. He was sent directly out on loan to Lokomotiv Plovdiv, where he was a first team regular. In 2011, he joined third league club Géants Athois.
