= Leoh Digbeu =

Ivorian footballer

Personal information
- Full name: Leoh Dodo Digbeu
- Date of birth: 25 June 1990 (age 36)
- Place of birth: Adzope, Ivory Coast
- Height: 1.83 m (6 ft 0 in)
- Position: Forward

Youth career
- 2006–2008: Bibó

Senior career*
| Years | Team | Apps | (Gls) |
| 2008–2009 | Baia Mare | | |
| 2009–2011 | CFR Cluj | 0 | (0) |
| 2009–2011 | → UTA Arad (loan) | 16 | (1) |
| 2011–2014 | Africa Sports | | |
| 2014 | Național Sebiș | 13 | (2) |
| 2014 | Concordia Chiajna | 3 | (0) |
| 2015–2016 | Național Sebiș | | |
- * Club domestic league appearances and goals as of 19 August 2015

Leoh Dodo Digbeu (born 25 June 1990) is an Ivorian footballer who plays as a forward.
