= Brandon McDonald (footballer) =

Guamanian former soccer player (born 1986)

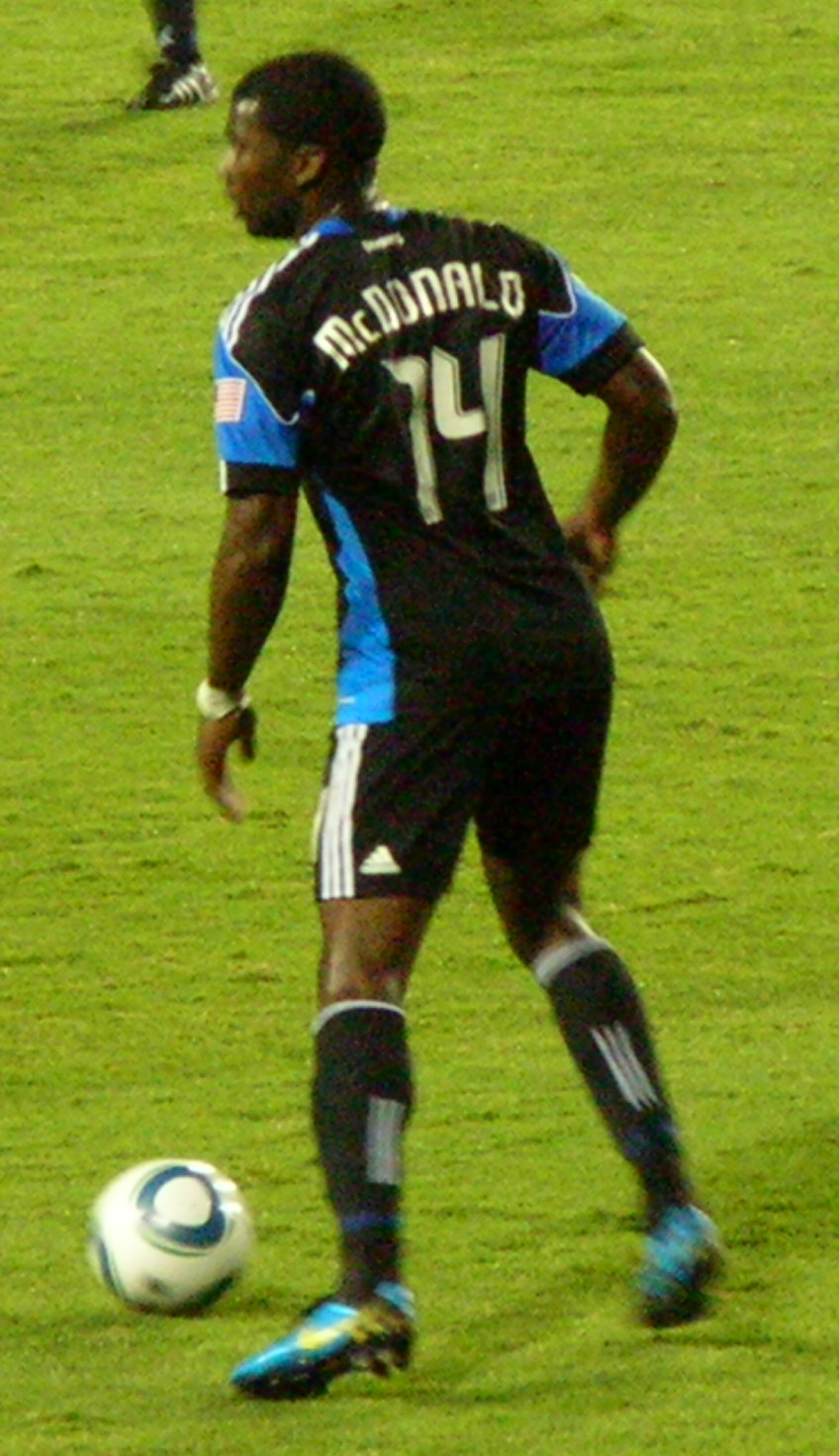
- McDonald with the San Jose Earthquakes in 2010

Personal information
- Full name: Brandon Marquee McDonald
- Date of birth: January 16, 1986 (age 40)
- Place of birth: Glendale, Arizona, United States
- Height: 6 ft 1 in (1.85 m)
- Position: Defender

College career
Years	Team	Apps	(Gls)
2004–2007	San Francisco Dons		

Senior career*
Years	Team	Apps	(Gls)
2006	San Francisco Seals	5	(0)
2007	San Jose Frogs	10	(1)
2008	LA Galaxy	16	(1)
2009–2011	San Jose Earthquakes	58	(3)
2011–2013	D.C. United	63	(3)
2013	Real Salt Lake	3	(0)
2014	Ljungskile SK	4	(0)
2015–2016	Chainat Hornbill	8	(0)
2016–2017	Rovers	0	(0)
2017	Penang FA	8	(0)
2019	Hanoi	4	(0)

International career^{‡}
2015–2016	Guam	13	(1)
- * Club domestic league appearances and goals as of January 21, 2020 ‡ National team caps and goals as of January 21, 2020

Brandon Marquee McDonald (born January 16, 1986) is a former footballer who played as a defender. Born in the United States, he represented Guam at international level.

== Club career ==
=== Amateur and college ===
McDonald was an NSCAA High School All-American while playing for Cactus High School and participated in the annual High School All-America game. In addition, he was in the USA National under-17 pool. Before moving to the University of San Francisco in 2004 McDonald played for the Sereno Golden Eagles youth club with Michael Gavin, Rob Valentino and current teammate Robbie Findley. McDonald played over 50 games for the Dons, finishing second on the team in scoring in his freshman year. He also shared the Stephen Negoesco Award for achievement by an underclassmen in 2004.

During his college years McDonald also played with both the San Francisco Seals and the San Jose Frogs of the USL Premier Development League.

=== Los Angeles Galaxy ===
McDonald was the 46th overall pick in the 2008 MLS SuperDraft, selected by the Los Angeles Galaxy, and made his MLS debut as a substitute in Galaxy's first match of the 2008 season against Colorado Rapids on March 29, 2008. He scored his first MLS goal on October 12, 2008, a 35-yard strike, also against Colorado. The then-rookie shared a locker room with David Beckham and Landon Donovan while taking instruction from Bruce Arena.

=== San Jose Earthquakes ===
After a season in Carson, McDonald moved to San Jose, where the Earthquakes finally gave him the chance to play on a regular basis. McDonald made the most of the opportunity, starting 28 matches in 2010 as the Northern California side advanced to the Eastern Conference Finals. Despite the team's success, improved depth along San Jose's back line made playing time difficult to come by in 2011 and - in need of cap space - the 'Quakes began looking to make a deal involving the talented back. He was waived by the Galaxy in February 2009 and signed with the San Jose Earthquakes on March 20, 2009.

=== D.C. United ===
On June 27, 2011, McDonald was traded to D.C. United from San Jose in exchange for allocation money. He signed a contract extension with D.C. on August 23, 2011. Terms of the new contract were undisclosed.

=== Real Salt Lake ===
McDonald was traded to Real Salt Lake on July 17, 2013, in exchange for a third-round 2014 MLS SuperDraft pick and a conditional pick in the 2015 MLS SuperDraft. He started three games for the team before being included in RSL's re-entry draft list but was not picked up in the draft.

=== Ljungskile SK ===
In 2014, McDonald signed for Ljungskile SK.

=== Chainat Hornbill ===
In July 2015, he joined Chainat Hornbill for the second half of the 2015 Thai Premier League season. Before moving to Rovers FC (Guam) to play for them a season in 2016.

=== Penang FA ===
In June 2017, McDonald signed for Penang FA, a club in the top division of Malaysian football, the Malaysia Super League. He made his debut against Four time MSL Champions, Johor Darul Ta'zim F.C.

=== Hanoi FC ===
Early in the 2019 V.League 1 season, McDonald signed for Hanoi FC.

== International career ==
On December 22, 2009, McDonald received his first call up to train with the senior US national team. In July 2014 McDonald was initially called up for the Guam national team EAFF Cup training camp but due to schedule conflicts he was unable to attend. McDonald has Guam roots on his father's side.

== Career statistics ==
=== International ===
Appearances and goals by national team and year
National team	Year	Apps	Goals
Guam	2015	8	1
Guam	2016	5	0
Total		13	1

Guam score listed first, score column indicates score after each McDonald goal.

List of international goals scored by Brandon McDonald
No.	Date	Venue	Cap	Opponent	Score	Result	Competition	Ref.
1	16 June 2015	Guam National Football Stadium, Hagatna, Guam	4	India	2–1	2–1	FIFA World Cup Qualification	

== Personal life ==
His sister Jessica McDonald is also a professional soccer player.
