= Patrice Sorbara =

French footballer (born 1985)

Personal information
- Date of birth: September 8, 1985 (age 41)
- Place of birth: Bastia, France
- Height: 1.79 m (5 ft 10 in)
- Position: Defender

Senior career*
Years	Team	Apps	(Gls)
2002–2007	SC Bastia (B team)		
2006–2007	SC Bastia	1	(0)
2007–2012	CA Bastia		
2012–2013	Borgo FC		
- * Club domestic league appearances and goals

Patrice Sorbara (born September 8, 1985) is a former French professional football player.

He played on the professional level in Ligue 2 for SC Bastia.
