= Constant Djakpa =

Ivorian footballer (born 1986)

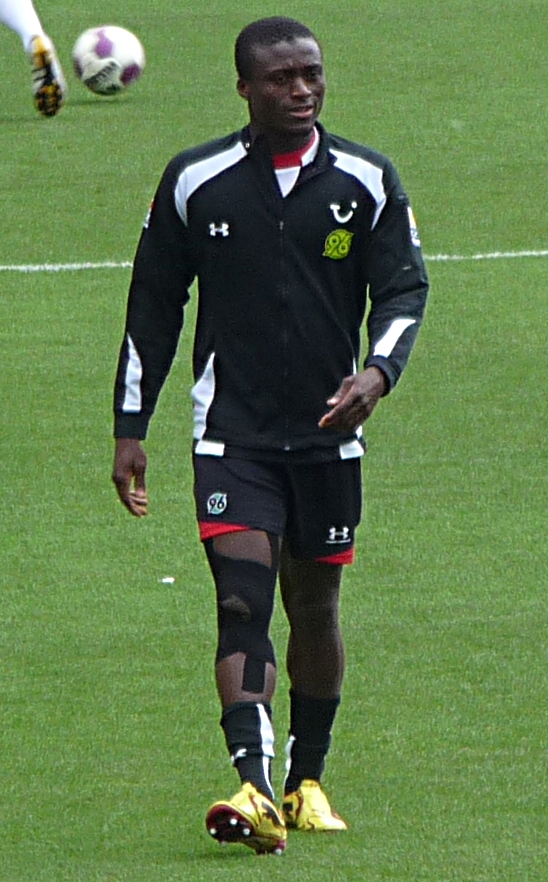
- Djakpa with Hannover in 2010

Personal information
- Full name: Tohouri Zahoui Constant Djakpa
- Date of birth: 17 October 1986 (age 40)
- Place of birth: Abidjan, Ivory Coast
- Height: 1.77 m (5 ft 9 1/2 in)
- Position: Left back

Youth career
- Stella Club d'Adjamé

Senior career*
Years	Team	Apps	(Gls)
2005	Stella Club d'Adjamé		
2006–2007	Sogndal	21	(0)
2007–2008	Pandurii Târgu Jiu	28	(2)
2008–2011	Bayer Leverkusen	9	(0)
2009–2011	→ Hannover 96 (loan)	38	(0)
2011–2016	Eintracht Frankfurt	71	(1)
2012	Eintracht Frankfurt II	2	(0)
2017	1. FC Nürnberg	11	(0)
2018–2019	Hessen Dreieich	23	(1)
2021	AS Poissy	0	(0)
2021–2022	AS Chatou		
Total		203	(4)

International career^{‡}
- Ivory Coast U21
- Ivory Coast U23
2007–2015	Ivory Coast	8	(0)
- * Club domestic league appearances and goals as of 9 October 2018 ‡ National team caps and goals as of 10 June 2016

Tohouri Zahoui Constant Djakpa (born 17 October 1986) is an Ivorian former professional footballer who played as a left back.

== Club career ==
Djakpa was born on 17 October 1986 in Abidjan, Ivory Coast and began playing football in 2005 at Stella Club d'Adjamé. In 2006, he moved to Europe to play for Norwegian second league side Sogndal.

In 2007, Djakpa joined Romanian side Pandurii Târgu Jiu, which paid €75,000 for his transfer. He made his Liga I debut under coach Eugen Neagoe on 29 July in a 1–1 draw against Universitatea Cluj, opening the scoring with a free kick. On 15 December he scored in a 3–1 away loss to Oțelul Galați, but also received a red card. On 26 April 2008, Djakpa made his last Liga I appearance in Pandurii's 1–0 loss against FC Vaslui in which he was sent off in the 62nd minute.

In June 2008, Djakpa was transferred from Pandurii to German side Bayer Leverkusen for a €1.1 million fee. He made his Bundesliga debut on 16 August when coach Bruno Labbadia used him as a starter in a 3–2 home loss to Borussia Dortmund. One year later he was loaned by Leverkusen to fellow Bundesliga club Hannover 96 for two seasons. For the 2011–12 season, Djakpa went to play for 2. Bundesliga side Eintracht Frankfurt whom he helped gain promotion to the first league. In the 2013–14 Europa League campaign, Djakpa appeared in four games for Eintracht, scoring two free-kick goals in their group stage victories against Bordeaux and APOEL. On 14 May 2016, Djakpa made his last Bundesliga appearance, playing for Eintracht in a 1–0 away loss to Werder Bremen, totaling 92 matches in the competition.

In January 2017, he returned to 2. Bundesliga at 1. FC Nürnberg for a six-month spell. On 12 September 2018, Djakpa joined Regionalliga Südwest side Hessen Dreieich. Djakpa ended his career in 2022, after playing in the French lower leagues for AS Poissy and AS Chatou.

== International career ==
Djakpa played for the Ivory Coast Olympic team and for the country's under-21 side. He represented the latter during the 2008 Toulon Tournament, scoring two goals, one from a penalty in a 1–0 win over the United States and the other in a loss to Chile.

Djakpa played eight games for Ivory Coast, making his debut on 21 November 2007 when coach Uli Stielike sent him to replace Bakari Koné in a friendly which ended with a 6–1 away win over Qatar. He was selected by coach Gérard Gili to be part of the 2008 Africa Cup of Nations squad, but did not play a single game there. Djakpa represented Ivory Coast in the 2014 World Cup, coach Sabri Lamouchi sending him in 74th minute to replace Arthur Boka in a 2–1 group stage victory against Japan from the group stage.

Djakpa's last two appearances for the national team took place during the 2017 Africa Cup of Nations qualifiers, both against Sudan, resulting in a victory and a draw.
