= Kafoumba Coulibaly =

Ivorian footballer

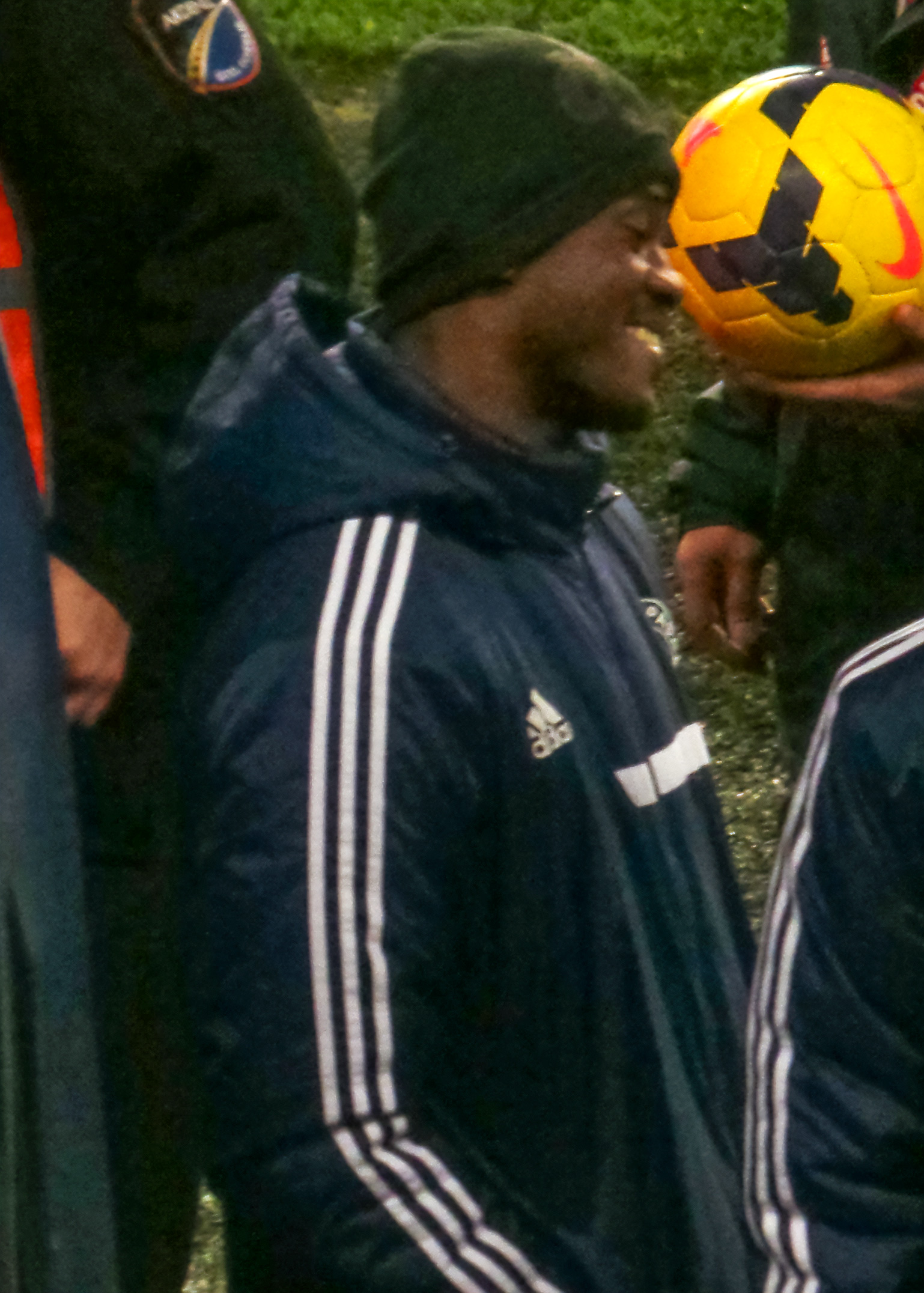
- Coulibaly in 2014

Personal information
- Full name: Kafoumba Coulibaly
- Date of birth: 26 October 1985 (age 41)
- Place of birth: Treichville, Ivory Coast
- Height: 1.79 m (5 ft 10 in)
- Position: Defensive midfielder

Youth career
- Académie de Sol Beni

Senior career*
| Years | Team | Apps | (Gls) |
| 2003–2004 | ASEC Mimosas | | |
| 2004–2005 | Beveren | | |
| 2005–2006 | Chonburi FC | | |
| 2006–2007 | BEC Tero | | |
| 2007–2008 | Bastia | 18 | (0) |
| 2008–2012 | Nice | 93 | (3) |
| 2012–2015 | Kasımpaşa | 5 | (0) |
| 2017 | CA Bastia | 1 | (0) |
| Total | | 117 | (3) |

International career
| 2008 | Ivory Coast U23 | | |
| 2008–2012 | Ivory Coast | 12 | (0) |
- * Club domestic league appearances and goals

Kafoumba Coulibaly (born 26 October 1985) is an Ivorian former professional footballer who played as a defensive midfielder.

== Club career ==
Coulibaly began his career at the famous Ivorian club ASEC Abidjan, in their youth academy run by former French international Jean-Marc Guillou. In 2004, he followed the well-trodden path from his homeland club to Belgian Jupiler League side Beveren, before spending time playing in Thailand for first Chonburi FC, then for BEC Tero.

In 2007, he moved to French Ligue 2 outfit Bastia, and after an impressive debut season in the French league, he was signed by Côte d'Azur-based Ligue 1 outfit Nice, joining his compatriot, and former Ivorian international Emerse Faé. In August 2012, Coulibaly signed a three-year contract with Turkish Süper Lig club Kasımpaşa, which was then terminated in mutual agreement in January 2015.

== International career ==
Coulibaly is part of the Ivorian squad for the 2008 Olympics in Beijing, China.

On 22 June 2008, he was part of the senior Ivorian squad for the 2010 World Cup qualifier against Botswana, but was an unused substitute, as the Elephants ran out 4–0 winners. Finally, he received his first cap in the 2010 FIFA World Cup qualification match against Mozambique on 7 September 2008.

== Career statistics ==
Ivory Coast national team
| Year | Apps | Goals |
| 2008 | 1 | 0 |
| 2009 | 0 | 0 |
| 2010 | 1 | 0 |
| 2011 | 4 | 0 |
| 2012 | 6 | 0 |
| Total | 12 | 0 |

== Honours ==
Ivory Coast

- Africa Cup of Nations runner-up:2012
