= Cyriaque Louvion =

French footballer (born 1987)

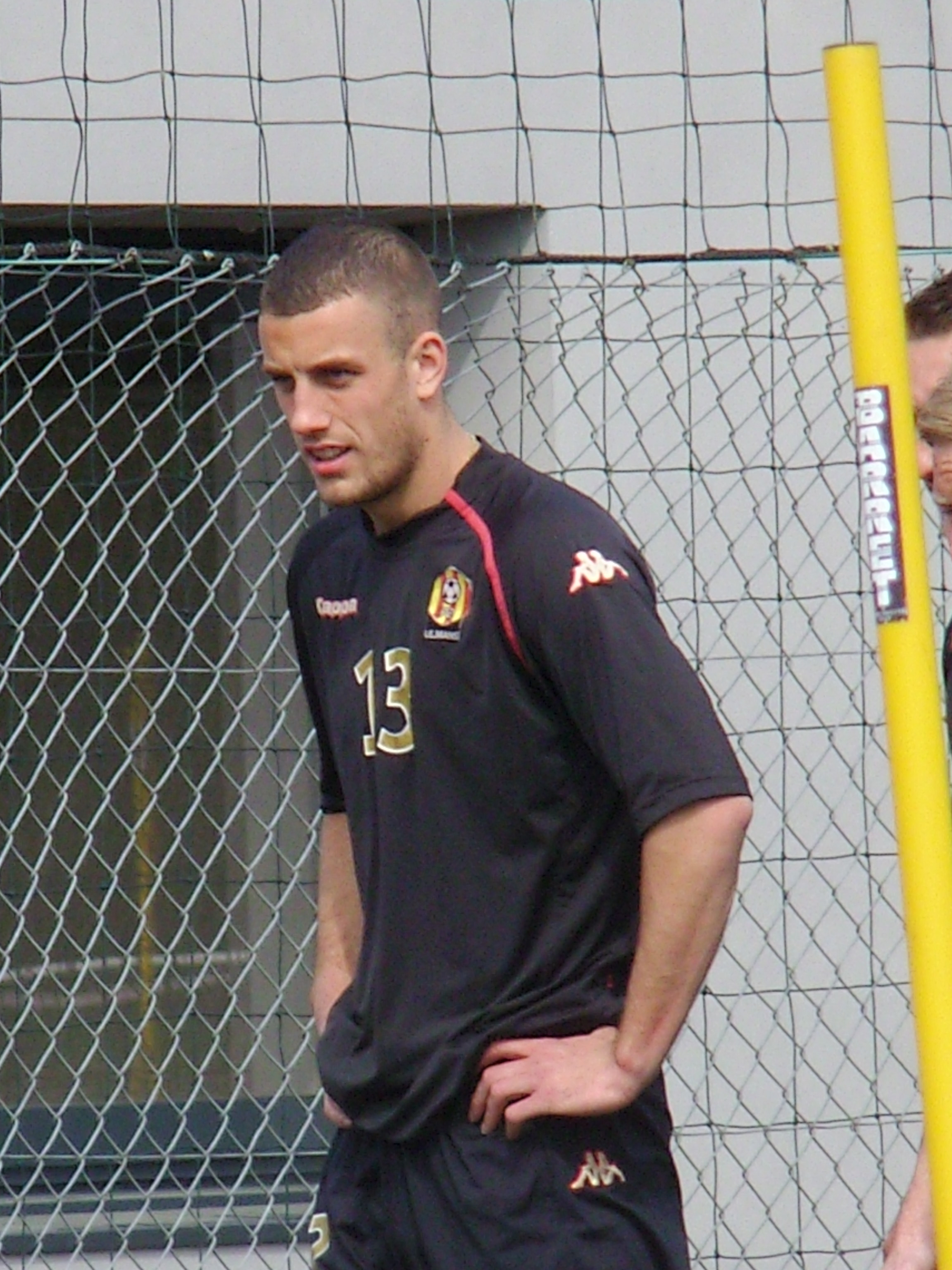
- Louvion with Le Mans in 2010

Personal information
- Date of birth: 24 July 1987 (age 39)
- Place of birth: Saint-Saulve, France
- Height: 1.85 m (6 ft 1 in)
- Position: Centre-back

Team information
- Current team: Thonon Evian

Youth career
- 1994–1998: UO Albertville
- 1998–2001: Lyon
- 2001–2004: Nice

Senior career*
Years	Team	Apps	(Gls)
2004–2006	Cannes	28	(1)
2006–2011	Le Mans	88	(0)
2010–2011	Le Mans B	6	(0)
2011–2015	Le Havre	80	(2)
2012–2014	Le Havre B	7	(0)
2015	Ergotelis	15	(0)
2015–2019	Tours	88	(5)
2016–2017	Tours B	3	(0)
2019–	Thonon Evian	22+ (Note: Statistics are missing for the 2019–20 season.)	(1+)

International career
2007	France U20	2	(0)
2007–2008	France U21	2	(0)
- * Club domestic league appearances and goals as of 01:33, 9 June 2022 (UTC)

Cyriaque Louvion (born 24 July 1987) is a French professional footballer who plays as a centre-back for Championnat National 3 club Thonon Evian.

== Club career ==
On 8 August 2019, Louvion left Tours to join Thonon Evian.

== Honours ==
Thonon Evian

- Championnat National 3: 2021–22
- Régional 1 Auvergne-Rhône-Alpes: 2019–20
