= Julien Quercia =

French footballer (born 1986)

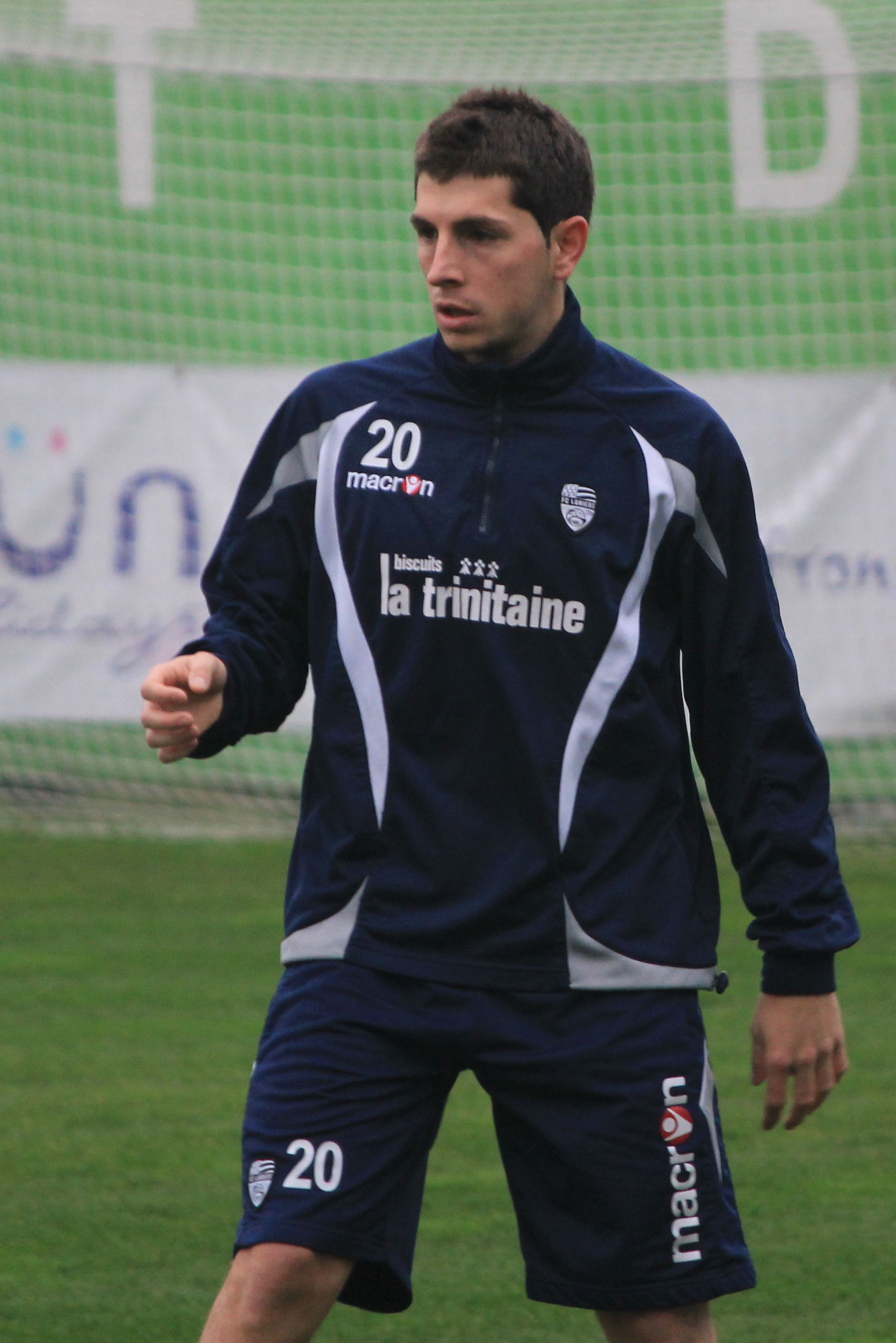
- Quercia training with Lorient in 2013

Personal information
- Date of birth: 17 August 1986 (age 40)
- Place of birth: Thionville, France
- Height: 1.69 m (5 ft 7 in)
- Positions: Midfielder; winger

Youth career
- Sochaux

Senior career*
Years	Team	Apps	(Gls)
2005–2008	Sochaux	50	(3)
2008–2011	Auxerre	55	(7)
2011–2015	Lorient	10	(2)
Total		115	(12)
- * Club domestic league appearances and goals

Julien Quercia (born 17 August 1986) is a French former professional footballer who played as a midfielder or winger for Sochaux, Auxerre, and Lorient.
