= Xavier Pentecôte =

French footballer (born 1986)

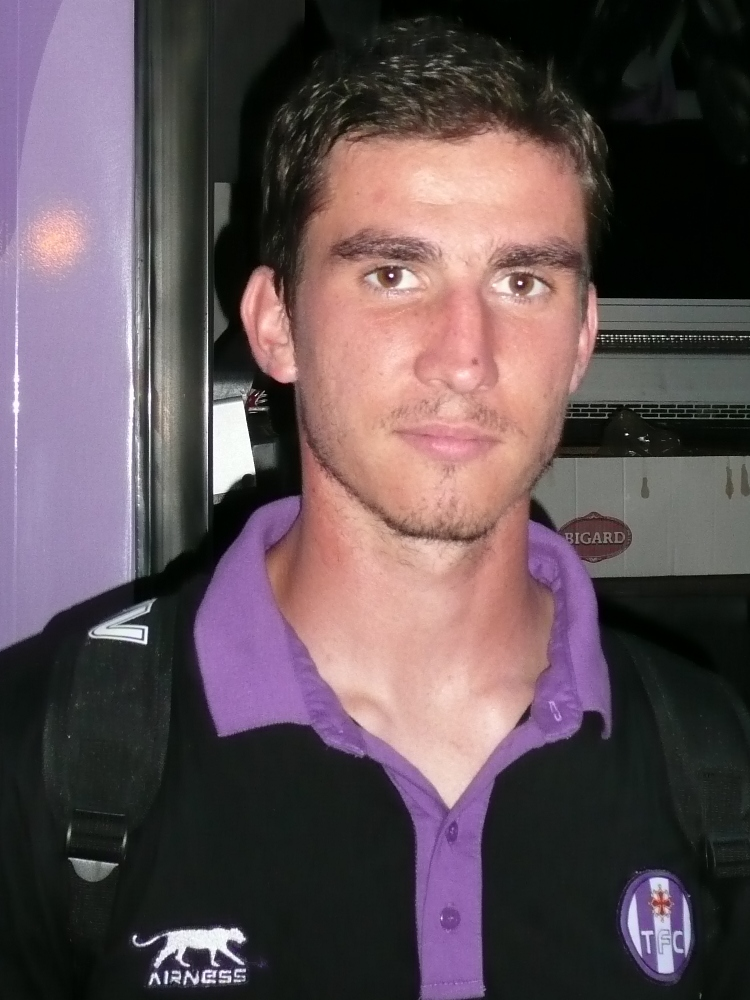
- Pentecôte with Toulouse in 2008

Personal information
- Date of birth: 13 August 1986 (age 40)
- Place of birth: Saint-Dié, France
- Height: 1.80 m (5 ft 11 in)
- Position: Striker

Youth career
- 2001–2004: Toulouse

Senior career*
Years	Team	Apps	(Gls)
2004–2011	Toulouse	33	(2)
2007–2008	→ Bastia (loan)	32	(12)
2010	→ Bastia (loan)	15	(12)
2011–2015	Nice	12	(0)
2012–2013	Nice B	3	(1)
Total		95	(27)
- * Club domestic league appearances and goals

Xavier Pentecôte (born 13 August 1986) is a French former professional footballer who played as a striker. He played for Toulouse, Bastia, and Nice.

== Career ==
Born in Saint-Dié, Pentecôte joined Toulouse in 2001 and turned professional in 2004. He spent the 2007–08 season on loan at Bastia, and rejoined the Corsican club in January 2010 for a second loan spell. in August 2011, he completed a move to Ligue 1 rivals Nice, signing a four-year contract.

He retired in 2015 after recurring injury problems.
