= Sekou Cissé =

Ivorian footballer

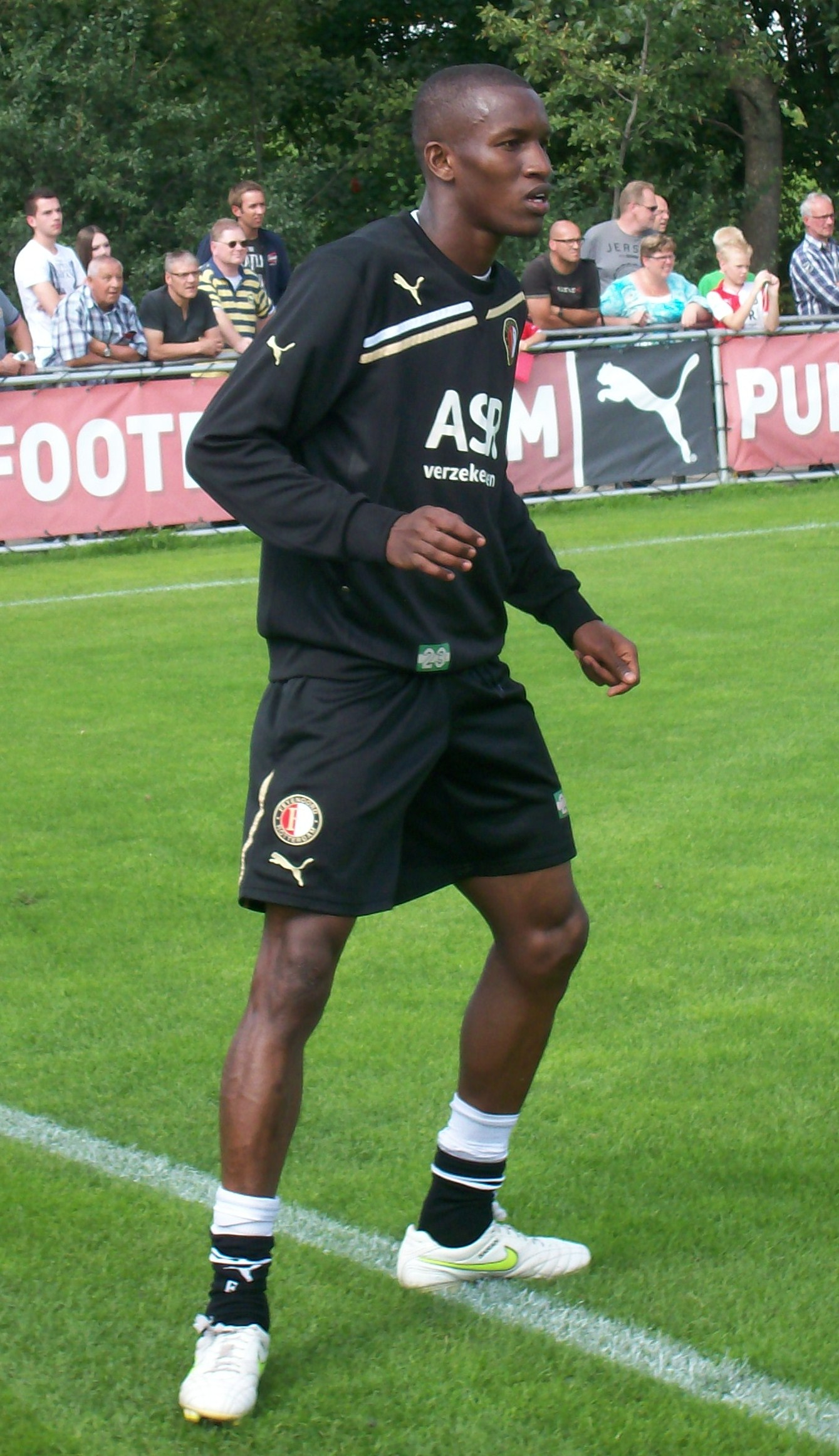
- Cissé with Feyenoord

Personal information
- Date of birth: 23 May 1985 (age 41)
- Place of birth: Dabou, Ivory Coast
- Height: 1.84 m (6 ft 0 in)
- Position: Forward

Youth career
- FC Bibo
- JMG Academy Abidjan

Senior career*
Years	Team	Apps	(Gls)
2004–2009	Roda JC	133	(24)
2009–2014	Feyenoord	59	(15)
2014–2015	Genk	32	(7)
2015–2016	Sochaux	26	(8)
2016–2017	Gazélec Ajaccio	31	(4)
2017–2019	Anorthosis Famagusta	27	(4)

International career
2008	Ivory Coast U23	4	(2)
2008–2009	Ivory Coast	10	(3)
- * Club domestic league appearances and goals

Sekou Cissé (born 23 May 1985) is an Ivorian former professional footballer who played as a forward.

== Club career ==
Cissé began his career in his home country, where he played for JMG Academy Abidjan, but moved to the Netherlands in February 2004 under the advice of fellow international Arouna Koné, who was playing for Roda at the time. Following the departure of Koné to Eindhoven in 2005, Cissé had a larger role in the Roda team and was noted for his speed.

In 2006, it was reported that Louis van Gaal, coach of fellow Eredivisie side AZ Alkmaar, was interested in signing him, as part of an exchange deal with Adil Ramzi. Roda, however, refused to negotiate, stating that they wanted to keep him in their team.

In the season 2008–09, Cissé started to become a very influential part of the Roda JC-team. His performance attracted the attention of other clubs and he was soon linked to clubs like Feyenoord, Eindhoven and Twente. It was made known on 30 June 2009, that Cissé would leave Roda, to join one of the major clubs in the Eredivisie, Feyenoord. On 5 July 2009, the transfer was officially announced on the website of Feyenoord, after he passed a medical test. It was announced that Cissé would sign a five-year contract with Feyenoord. After suffering many injuries and because of a lack of prospect, Cissé and Feyenoord dissolved his contract on 3 January 2014. After a successful trial he signed a contract on 13 January 2014, at Genk.

Cissé left Anorthosis Famagusta on 9 January 2019.

== International career ==
He was called up for the Ivory Coast preliminary squad for the 2008 African Cup of Nations competition to take place in Ghana.

He competed in the 2008 Toulon Tournament for the U-23 team, which placed third. Cissé was top scorer of the tournament with four goals.

== Career statistics ==
As of matches played on 19 July 2019

Ivory Coast national team
Year	Apps	Goals
2008	5	3
2009	5	0
Total	10	3

As of matches played on 19 July 2019

#	Date	Venue	Opponent	Score	Result	Competition
	1 June 2008	Abidjan, Ivory Coast	Mozambique	1–0	Won	2010 FIFA World Cup qualification
	22 June 2008	Abidjan, Ivory Coast	Botswana	1–0	Won	2010 FIFA World Cup Qualification
	22 June 2008	Abidjan, Ivory Coast	Botswana	4–0	Won	2010 FIFA World Cup Qualification
