= 2004–05 Galatasaray S.K. season =

Galatasaray
2004–05 season
- President: Özhan Canaydın
- Head coach: Gheorghe Hagi
- Stadium: Ali Sami Yen Stadı
- Süper Lig: 3rd
- Turkish Cup: Winners
- Top goalscorer: League: Hakan Şükür (18); All: Hakan Şükür (22)
Home colours	Away colours	Third colours

The 2004–05 season was Galatasaray's 101st in existence and the 47th consecutive season in the Süper Lig. This article shows statistics of the club's players in the season, and also lists all matches that the club have played in the season.

== Squad statistics ==
No.	Pos.	Name	Süper Lig		Türkiye Kupası		Total	
No.	Pos.	Name	Apps	Goals	Apps	Goals	Apps	Goals
1	GK	(Colombia) Faryd Mondragón	34	0	4	0	38	0
17	GK	(Turkey) Fevzi Elmas	1	0	0	0	1	0
12	GK	(Turkey) Aykut Erçetin	0	0	1	0	1	0
33	DF	(Turkey) Uğur Uçar	6	0	4	0	10	0
55	DF	(Turkey) Sabri Sarıoğlu	31	1	4	0	35	1
4	DF	(Turkey) Orhan Ak	18	3	3	0	21	3
2	DF	(Croatia) Stjepan Tomas	34	0	4	0	38	0
3	DF	(Turkey) Bülent Korkmaz (C)	13	0	2	0	15	0
4	DF	(Cameroon) Rigobert Song	32	2	4	0	36	2
19	DF	(Turkey) Cihan Haspolatlı	33	2	5	0	38	2
57	DF	(Turkey) Hakan Ünsal	15	0	2	1	17	1
29	MF	(Turkey) Mülayim Erdem	0	0	0	0	0	0
-	MF	(Cameroon) Alioum Saidou	6	0	0	0	6	0
23	MF	(Turkey) Zafer Şakar	2	0	0	0	2	0
67	MF	(Turkey) Ergün Penbe	32	1	4	0	36	1
18	MF	(Turkey) Ayhan Akman	21	1	5	2	26	3
11	MF	(Turkey) Hasan Şaş	22	4	5	0	27	4
28	MF	(France) Franck Ribéry	14	0	3	1	17	1
24	MF	(Romania) Ovidiu Petre	5	0	2	0	7	0
20	MF	(Turkey) Volkan Arslan	18	1	1	0	19	1
8	MF	(Brazil) Flávio Conceição	27	2	3	0	30	2
16	MF	(Switzerland) Hakan Yakın	2	0	0	0	2	0
22	MF	(Turkey) Arda Turan	1	0	1	0	2	0
14	FW	(Bosnia and Herzegovina) Elvir Baljić	10	1	0	0	10	1
58	FW	(Turkey) Hasan Kabze	14	8	2	0	16	8
6	FW	(Turkey) Arif Erdem	11	1	2	0	13	1
15	FW	(Romania) Florin Bratu	0	0	0	0	0	0
25	FW	(Turkey) Necati Ateş	33	15	5	3	38	18
9	FW	(Turkey) Hakan Şükür	33	18	3	4	36	22
-	FW	(Turkey) Ümit Karan	6	2	0	0	6	2
15	FW	(Turkey) Cafercan Aksu	2	0	1	0	3	0

=== Players in / out ===
==== In ====
Pos.	Nat.	Name	Age	Moving from
DF	(Cameroon)	Rigobert Song	28	RC Lens
DF	(Croatia)	Stjepan Tomas	28	Fenerbahçe SK
MF	(Brazil)	Flávio Conceição	30	Real Madrid CF
MF	(Cameroon)	Alioum Saidou	26	Istanbulspor
DF	(Turkey)	Uğur Uçar	17	Galatasaray A2
MF	(Turkey)	Arda Turan	17	Galatasaray A2
MF	(Turkey)	Mülayim Erdem	17	Galatasaray A2
MF	(Turkey)	Zafer Şakar	19	Galatasaray A2
MF	(France)	Franck Ribéry	21	FC Metz
FW	(Turkey)	Hasan Kabze	22	Çanakkalespor
MF	(Switzerland)	Hakan Yakın	27	VfB Stuttgart
GK	(Turkey)	Fevzi Elmas	21	Çanakkalespor

==== Out ====
Pos.	Nat.	Name	Age	Moving to
GK	(Ghana)	Richard Kingson	24	Ankaraspor
MF	(Brazil)	João Batista	29	FC Shakhtar Donetsk
DF	(Brazil) (Italy)	César Prates	29	Figueirense FC
DF	(Turkey)	Emrah Umut	22	Karşıyaka S.K.
MF	(Turkey)	Murat Erdoğan	28	Malatyaspor
FW	(Romania)	Florin Bratu	24	FC Nantes
FW	(Turkey)	Berkant Göktan	24	Beşiktaş JK
DF	(Hungary)	Dániel Tőzsér	19	Ferencvárosi TC
DF	(Turkey)	Ömer Erdoğan	27	Malatyaspor
FW	(Turkey)	Ümit Karan	28	Ankaraspor on loan
DF	(Turkey)	Suat Usta	24	Konyaspor on loan
FW	(Bosnia and Herzegovina)	Elvir Baljić	30	Konyaspor

== Süper Lig ==
=== Standings ===
Pos	Team	Pld	W	D	L	GF	GA	GD	Pts	Qualification or relegation
1	Fenerbahçe (C)	34	26	2	6	77	24	+53	80	Qualification to Champions League group stage (Note: Liverpool, winner of 2004–05 UEFA Champions League, forced to play in the UEFA Champions League first qualifying round as they cannot finish 2004–05 FA Premier League top four, so the title holder spot in the group stage became vacant and this spot goes to best excluded champions, champion of Turkey, originally qualified for the third qualifying round.)
2	Trabzonspor	34	24	5	5	73	29	+44	77	Qualification to Champions League second qualifying round
3	Galatasaray	34	24	4	6	64	25	+39	76	Qualification to UEFA Cup first round (Note: Galatasaray have won the 2004–05 Turkish Cup competition and thus are qualified for the first round of the UEFA Cup.)
4	Beşiktaş	34	20	9	5	70	39	+31	69	Qualification to UEFA Cup second qualifying round
5	Gençlerbirliği	34	14	9	11	52	41	+11	51	

Rules for classification: 1) points; 2) goal difference; 3) number of goals scored.
(C) Champions

== Türkiye Kupası ==
=== Second round ===
22 December 2004 1	Galatasaray SK	3–0	KDÇ Karabükspor	Istanbul
19:30 EET	Hakan Ünsal 22'; Ayhan Akman 43'; Necati Ateş 57'	(Report)		Stadium: Ali Sami Yen Stadı; Referee: Vedat Yüksel

=== Third round ===
22 January 2005 1	Galatasaray SK	1–0	Bursaspor	İzmit
20:00 EET	Hakan Şükür 16'	(Report)		Stadium: İsmet Paşa Stadı; Referee: Tolga Özkalfa

=== Quarter final ===
1 March 2005 1	Diyarbakırspor	0–1	Galatasaray SK	Diyarbakır
20:00 EET		(Report)	Ayhan Akman 40'	Stadium: Diyarbakır Atatürk Stadı; Referee: Bülent Demirlek

=== Semi final ===
20 April 2005 1	Galatasaray SK	1–1 (4–2 p)	Trabzonspor	Istanbul
20:00 EET	Necati Ateş 88'	(Report)	Fatih Tekke 57'	Stadium: Ali Sami Yen Stadı; Referee: İsmet Arzuman
	Penalties
	Ergün Penbe (penalty scored); Hasan Kabze (penalty scored); Necati Ateş (penalty scored); Sabri Sarıoğlu (penalty missed); Hasan Şaş (penalty scored)		(penalty scored) İbrahim Yattara; (penalty missed) Mehmet Hilmi Yılmaz; (penalty missed) Miroslaw Szymkowiak; (penalty scored) Celaleddin Koçak

=== Final ===
11 May 2005 1	Galatasaray SK	5–1	Fenerbahçe SK	Istanbul
21:00 EET	Franck Ribéry 15'; Necati Ateş 23'; Hakan Şükür 36', 71', 88'	(Report)	Fábio Luciano 40'	Stadium: Atatürk Olympic Stadium; Attendance: 17,061; Referee: Serdar Tatlı

== Friendlies ==
24 July 2004	Galatasaray SK	2–0	FK Partizan
		(Report)

1 August 2004 ChampionsWorld Series	FC Porto	1–2	Galatasaray SK	East Rutherford
	Maniche 90'	(Report)	Hakan Şükür 4'; Arif Erdem 85'	Stadium: Giants Stadium; Attendance: 15,408; Referee: Kevin Terry; Man of the Match: Hakan Sukur

8 January 2005	Galatasaray SK	0–0	Borussia Dortmund	Antalya
20:00		(Report)

10 January 2005	Galatasaray SK	1–1	FC Spartak Moscow	Antalya
20:00	Necati Ateş 85'	(Report)	Fernando Cavenaghi 40'

15 January 2005	FC Schalke 04	0–1	Galatasaray SK	Gelsenkirchen
16:30		(Report)	Necati Ateş 13'	Stadium: Arena auf Schalke; Attendance: 42,300

23 March 2005	Galatasaray SK	4–1	IFK Göteborg	Istanbul
19:30	Hasan Şaş 25'; Cafercan Aksu 28'; Volkan Arslan 32'; Özgürcan Özcan 89'	(Report)	Peter Ijeh 79'	Stadium: Ali Sami Yen Stadı

== Attendance ==
Competition	Av. Att.	Total Att.
Süper Lig	-	-
Türkiye Kupası	-	-
Total	-	-
