= Hurser Tekinoktay =

Turkish football trainer (born 1960)

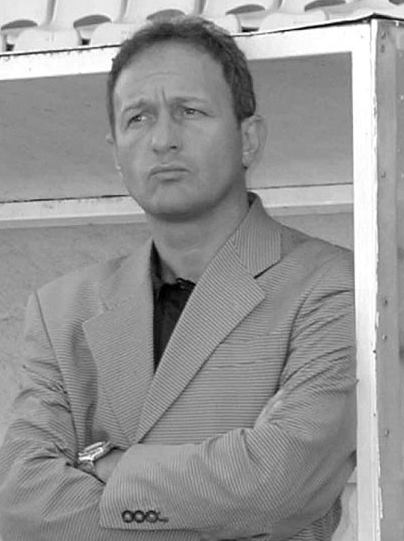
- Hurser Tekinoktay in 2002.

Personal information
- Full name: Hürser Tekinoktay
- Date of birth: 31 July 1960 (age 66)
- Place of birth: Istanbul, Turkey

Senior career*
Years	Team	Apps	(Gls)
1995–2000	Beşiktaş	269	(234)
Total		341	(267)
- * Club domestic league appearances and goals

Hurser Tekinoktay (born 31 July 1960) is a Turkish football trainer. He grew up in Beşiktaş and played for its youth team. He is fluent in Italian and English. He graduated from the College of Marmara Science Section.

== Career ==
He worked as an intern at the Club of Lazio on 1993-1994 season in Italy. He started his career that season. He is one of the new generation trainers in Turkey. Many of his students played in different national teams of Turkey:

Nihat Kahveci, one of his best players, was playing in Spain. Tolga Seyhan in Ukraine and Hasan Kabze in Russia are other examples of his footballers playing abroad.

He was candidate for Chairman of Beşiktaş on the May'2019 election.

=== Beşiktaş ===
With Beşiktaş, he trained many famous players. National level trainees include Yasin Sülün, Mesut Kumcuoğlu, Aydın Tuna, Tunç Kip, Savaş Kaya, Barbaros Yavasoglu, Yalçın Ayhan, Ali Cansun Bigecaslan and Nihat Kahveci. He was second trainer of Nevio Scala in the season 2000-2001.

=== Çanakkale Dardanelspor ===
After his duty in Beşiktaş, he started to work as the first trainer in Çanakkale Dardanelspor in 2001. At that time Dardanelspor was at the TFF First Division. During his duty in Çanakkale Dardanelspor he trained players such as Okan Koç, Tolga Seyhan, Gökhan Zan, Hasan Kabze, Mehmet Cogum, Fevzi Elmas, Ilkem Özkaynak, Ufuk Ates, Sinan Ertan, Unsal Aka, Mehmet Sen, Emirhan Ozdemir and Murat Önür.

== Team results ==
=== Beşiktaş ===
- 1995 Champion at United Nations Tournament.
- 1996 Berlin Champion at C Youth Tournament.
- 1997 Stuttgart Semifinal at 26th International Ergenzingen Tournament.
- 1998 Istanbul Champion at B Youth Group and A Youth Group.
- 1999-2000 Champion at Super Youth League.
- 1995-2000 Between these years 234 Win of 269 Official and Friendly matches at Beşiktaş.

=== Çanakkale Dardanelspor ===
- 2001- 2002 Season last 16 with Çanakkale Dardanelspor at Turkish Cup.
- 2001- 2002 ve 2002-2003 At these seasons 33 Win of 72 Official and Friendly matches.

== Managerial stats ==
Team	Nat	From	To	Record				
Team	Nat	From	To	G	W	D	Goal	Win %
Beşiktaş	(Turkey)	1995	2000	269	234	13	847	86.9
Çanakkale Dardanelspor	(Turkey)	2001	2003	72	33	14	118	45.8
'Total Career				341	267	27	965	78.2
