= 2003–04 Galatasaray S.K. season =

Galatasaray
2003–04 season
- President: Özhan Canaydın
- Head coach: Fatih Terim (until 20 March); Gheorghe Hagi
- Stadium: Atatürk Olympic Stadium
- Süper Lig: 6th
- Turkish Cup: Third round
- UEFA Champions League: Group stage
- UEFA Cup: Third round
- Top goalscorer: League: Hakan Şükür (12); All: Hakan Şükür (18)
- Highest home attendance: 71,334 vs Fenerbahçe (Süper Lig 21 September 2003)
- Lowest home attendance: 2,000 vs Çaykur Rizespor (Türkiye Kupası, 28 January 2004)
- Average home league attendance: 47,394
Home colours	Away colours	Third colours

The 2003–04 season was Galatasaray's 100th in existence and the 46th consecutive season in the Süper Lig. This article shows statistics of the club's players in the season, and also lists all matches that the club have played in the season.

== Squad statistics ==
No.	Pos.	Name	Süper Lig		Türkiye Kupası		Europe		Total	
No.	Pos.	Name	Apps	Goals	Apps	Goals	Apps	Goals	Apps	Goals
1	GK	(Colombia) (Lebanon) Faryd Mondragón	27	0	1	0	10	0	38	0
78	GK	(Ghana) Richard Kingson	1	0	0	0	0	0	1	0
-	GK	(Turkey) Mehmet Bölükbaşi	0	0	1	0	0	0	1	0
12	GK	(Turkey) Aykut Erçetin	7	0	1	0	0	0	8	0
-	DF	(Turkey) Uğur Uçar	1	0	0	0	0	0	1	0
55	DF	(Turkey) Sabri Sarıoğlu	31	4	2	0	9	1	42	5
4	DF	(Turkey) Orhan Ak	20	1	1	0	5	0	26	1
30	DF	(Romania) Gabriel Tamaș	6	0	2	0	5	0	13	0
2	DF	(Turkey) (Germany) Ömer Erdoğan	16	2	2	0	2	0	20	2
3	DF	(Turkey) Bülent Korkmaz (C)	23	0	0	0	8	0	31	0
5	DF	(Netherlands) Frank de Boer	15	1	0	0	8	0	23	1
22	DF	(Turkey) Abdullah Ercan	7	0	0	0	0	0	7	0
35	DF	(Turkey) Emrah Umut	4	0	0	0	0	0	4	0
29	DF	(Brazil) (Italy) César Prates	28	3	1	1	9	2	38	6
19	DF	(Turkey) Cihan Haspolatlı	23	2	0	0	6	1	29	3
57	DF	(Turkey) Hakan Ünsal	14	0	0	0	6	0	20	0
23	DF	(Turkey) (Netherlands) Suat Usta	10	1	0	0	2	0	12	1
-	MF	(Turkey) Eyüp Kaymakcı	1	0	0	0	0	0	1	0
33	MF	(Turkey) (England) Murat Erdoğan	10	2	0	0	3	1	13	3
67	MF	(Turkey) Ergün Penbe	24	0	2	1	10	0	36	1
18	MF	(Turkey) Ayhan Akman	23	1	2	0	5	0	30	1
11	MF	(Turkey) Hasan Şaş	22	2	1	0	9	1	32	3
8	MF	(Brazil) João Batista	16	1	2	0	7	0	25	1
24	MF	(Romania) Ovidiu Petre	22	1	2	0	6	0	30	1
20	MF	(Turkey) (Germany) Volkan Arslan	9	1	2	0	2	0	13	1
-	MF	(Turkey) Mülayim Erdem	1	0	0	0	0	0	1	0
7	MF	(Turkey) (Germany) Berkant Göktan	9	0	1	0	3	0	13	0
17	FW	(Brazil) Fábio Pinto	2	1	0	0	1	0	3	1
14	FW	(Bosnia and Herzegovina) Elvir Baljić	8	0	0	0	2	0	10	0
21	FW	(Democratic Republic of the Congo) (France) Ali Lukunku	1	1	0	0	1	0	2	1
6	FW	(Turkey) Arif Erdem	15	3	0	0	6	2	21	5
15	FW	(Romania) Florin Bratu	25	6	2	1	0	0	27	8
20	FW	(Turkey) Necati Ateş	14	9	0	0	2	0	16	9
10	FW	(Turkey) Hakan Şükür	29	12	1	0	9	6	39	18
9	FW	(Turkey) (Germany) Ümit Karan	8	1	2	1	4	0	14	2
-	FW	(Turkey) Cafercan Aksu	1	0	0	0	0	0	1	0

== Transfers ==
=== In ===
Pos.	Nat.	Name	Age	Moving from
DF	(Romania)	Gabriel Tamaș	20	(Romania) Dinamo București
DF	(Turkey)	Abdullah Ercan	32	(Turkey) Fenerbahçe
DF	(Netherlands)	Frank De Boer	33	(Spain) Barcelona
FW	(Turkey)	Hakan Şükür	32	(England) Blackburn Rovers
DF	(Turkey) (Germany)	Ömer Erdoğan	26	(Turkey) Diyarbakırspor
DF	(Turkey)	Orhan Ak	24	(Turkey) Kocaelispor
DF	(Brazil) (Italy)	César Prates	28	(Portugal) Sporting CP
MF	(Romania)	Ovidiu Petre	21	(Romania) Naţional București
FW	(Romania)	Florin Bratu	23	(Romania) Rapid București
MF	(Turkey) (England)	Murat Erdoğan	27	(Turkey) Gaziantepspor
MF	(Hungary)	Dániel Tőzsér	18	(Hungary) Debrecen
FW	(Turkey)	Necati Ateş	23	(Turkey) Adanaspor
DF	(Turkey)	Emrah Umut	21	(Turkey) Karşıyaka

=== Out ===
Pos.	Nat.	Name	Age	Moving to
MF	(Turkey)	Suat Kaya	36	Retired
GK	(Turkey)	Kerem İnan	23	(Turkey) Çaykur Rizespor
DF	(Turkey)	Emre Aşık	30	(Turkey) Beşiktaş
DF	(Portugal) (Mozambique)	Abel Xavier	31	(England) Liverpool
MF	(Turkey)	Vedat İnceefe	29	(Turkey) Manisaspor
MF	(Israel)	Haim Revivo	31	(Israel) F.C. Ashdod
DF	(Turkey)	Ümit Davala	30	(Italy) Inter Milan
DF	(Turkey)	Mehmet Polat	25	(Turkey) Gaziantepspor
FW	(Democratic Republic of the Congo) (France)	Ali Lukunku	27	(France) Lille
FW	(Brazil)	Fábio Pinto	22	(Brazil) Grêmio
DF	(Romania)	Gabriel Tamaș	20	(Russia) Spartak Moscow
DF	(Turkey)	Abdullah Ercan	32	(Turkey) İstanbulspor
DF	(Netherlands)	Frank de Boer	33	(Scotland) Rangers
GK	(Turkey)	Mehmet Bölükbaşi	25	(Turkey) İstanbulspor

== Pre-season ==
=== Amsterdam Tournament ===
==== Table ====
Team	Pld	W	D	L	GF	GA	GD	Pts
(Netherlands) Ajax	2	1	1	0	3	0	+3	7
(Italy) Internazionale	2	1	0	1	3	3	0	6
(Turkey) Galatasaray	2	1	0	1	2	4	-2	5
(England) Liverpool	2	0	1	1	1	2	-1	2

NB: An extra point is awarded for each goal scored.

==== Matches ====
1 August 2003

Galatasaray (Turkey)	0 – 3	(Italy) Internazionale
Hasan Şaş (red card) 82'	Report	Martins 37', 64'; Rebecchi 66'

Amsterdam ArenA, Amsterdam
Attendance: 42,000
Referee: Eric Braamhaar (Netherlands)
3 August 2003

Galatasaray (Turkey)	2 – 1	(England) Liverpool
Batista 21'; César Prates 38'	Report 1 Report 2	Heskey 36'; Mellor (red card) 85'; Gerrard (red card) 86'

Amsterdam ArenA, Amsterdam
Attendance: 35,000
Referee: René Temmink (Netherlands)

== Süper Lig ==
=== Standings ===
Pos	Team	Pld	W	D	L	GF	GA	GD	Pts
4	Gaziantepspor	34	18	3	13	52	51	+1	57
5	Denizlispor	34	17	4	13	52	43	+9	55
6	Galatasaray	34	15	9	10	56	47	+9	54
7	Samsunspor	34	13	7	14	46	47	−1	46
8	Malatyaspor	34	11	12	11	51	40	+11	45 (Note: Malatyaspor were ahead of Ankaragücü on head-to-head record: Ankaragücü–Malatyaspor 0–0, Malatyaspor–Ankaragücü 1–0.)

Rules for classification: 1) points; 2) goal difference; 3) number of goals scored.

== Türkiye Kupası ==
=== Second round ===
17 December 2003 1	Galatasaray SK	4–1	Türk Telekom GSK	Bursa
18:30 EET	Ergün Penbe 13'; Ümit Karan 18', pen' César Prates 67'; Florin Bratu 73'	(Report)	Tayfun Özkan 61'	Stadium: Bursa Atatürk Stadı; Attendance: 3,000; Referee: Vedat Tan

=== Third round ===
28 January 2004 1	Galatasaray SK	0–5	Çaykur Rizespor	Istanbul
21:00 EET		(Report)	Klodian Duro 38', 76'; Okan Öztürk 71', 88'; Zafer Demiray 84'	Stadium: Atatürk Olympic Stadium; Attendance: 2,000; Referee: Vedat Tan

== UEFA Champions League ==
=== Third qualifying round ===
13 August 2003 1	Galatasaray SK	3–0	PFC CSKA Sofia	Istanbul
21:00 EET	Hasan Şaş 3'; Hakan Şükür 6'; Arif Erdem 37'	(Report)		Stadium: Atatürk Olympic Stadium; Attendance: 66,300; Referee: (Germany) Markus Merk

27 August 2003 2	PFC CSKA Sofia	0–3	Galatasaray SK	Sofia
20:30 EET		(Report)	César Prates 28'; Sabri Sarıoğlu 53'; Arif Erdem 86'	Stadium: Balgarska Armia Stadium; Referee: (Italy) Domenico Messina

=== Group stage ===
Pos	Team	Pld	W	D	L	GF	GA	GD	Pts	Qualification
1	(Italy) Juventus	6	4	1	1	15	6	+9	13	Advance to knockout stage
2	(Spain) Real Sociedad	6	2	3	1	8	8	0	9	Advance to knockout stage
3	(Turkey) Galatasaray	6	2	1	3	6	8	−2	7	Transfer to UEFA Cup
4	(Greece) Olympiacos	6	1	1	4	6	13	−7	4	

Source: RSSSF

17 September 2003 1	Juventus FC	2–1	Galatasaray SK	Turin
21:45 EET	Alessandro Del Piero 5', 73'	(Report)	Hakan Şükür 19'	Stadium: Stadio delle Alpi; Referee: (Italy) Domenico Messina

30 September 2003 2	Galatasaray SK	1–2	Real Sociedad	Istanbul
21:45 EET	Hakan Şükür 61'	(Report)	Darko Kovačević 3'; Xabi Alonso 72'	Stadium: Atatürk Olympic Stadium; Attendance: 58,617; Referee: (Germany) Herbert Fandel

21 October 2003 3	Galatasaray SK	1–0	Olympiacos F.C.	Istanbul
21:45 EET	Cihan Haspolatlı 9'	(Report)		Stadium: Atatürk Olympic Stadium; Attendance: 41,125; Referee: (Switzerland) Urs Meier

5 November 2003 4	Olympiacos F.C.	3–0	Galatasaray SK	Piraeus
21:45 EET	Dimitris Mavrogenidis 6'; Nery Castillo 34'; Giovanni 90'	(Report)		Stadium: Georgios Kamaras Stadium; Referee: (Slovakia) Ľuboš Michel

2 December 2003 5	Galatasaray SK	2–0	Juventus FC	Dortmund
21:45 EET	Hakan Şükür 46', 90'	(Report)		Stadium: Westfalenstadion; Attendance: 44,045; Referee: (Denmark) Kim Milton Nielsen

10 December 2003 6	Real Sociedad	1–1	Galatasaray SK	San Sebastián
21:45 EET	Óscar de Paula 51'	(Report)	Hakan Şükür 26'	Stadium: Anoeta Stadium; Referee: (Norway) Terje Hauge

== UEFA Cup ==
=== Third round ===
26 February 2004 1	Galatasaray SK	2–2	Villarreal CF	Istanbul
20:30 EET	Murat Erdoğan 27'; César Prates 52'	(Report)	Sonny Anderson 7'; Juan Román Riquelme 22'	Stadium: Atatürk Olympic Stadium; Attendance: 55,000; Referee: (Italy) Stefano Farina

3 March 2004 2	Villarreal CF	3–0	Galatasaray SK	Vila-real
22:30 EET	Sonny Anderson 47'; Roger García Junyent 53'; Juan Román Riquelme 90'	(Report)		Stadium: El Madrigal; Referee: (Netherlands) Jan Wegereef

== Attendance ==
Competition	Av. Att.	Total Att.
Süper Lig	47,394	758,301
Türkiye Kupası	2,500	5,000
Europe	53,017	265,087
Total	44,712	1,028,388

- Sold season tickets: 38,000
