= 2002–03 Galatasaray S.K. season =

Galatasaray
2002–03 season
- President: Özhan Canaydın
- Head coach: Fatih Terim
- Stadium: Ali Sami Yen Stadı
- Süper Lig: 2nd
- Turkish Cup: Quarter-finals
- UEFA Champions League: Group stage
- Top goalscorer: League: Ümit Karan (16); All: Ümit Karan (19)
Home colours	Away colours	Third colours

The 2002–03 season was Galatasaray's 99th in existence and the 45th consecutive season in the Süper Lig. This article shows statistics of the club's players in the season, and also lists all matches that the club have played in the season.

== Squad statistics ==
No.	Pos.	Name	Süper Lig		Türkiye Kupası		CL		Total	
No.	Pos.	Name	Apps	Goals	Apps	Goals	Apps	Goals	Apps	Goals
1	GK	(Colombia) (Lebanon) Faryd Mondragón	32	0	1	0	6	0	39	0
61	GK	(Turkey) Mehmet Bölükbaşı	1	0	0	0	0	0	1	0
16	GK	(Turkey) Kerem İnan	1	0	2	0	0	0	3	0
16	GK	(Turkey) Aykut Erçetin	0	0	0	0	0	0	0	0
2	DF	(Turkey) Mehmet Polat	13	1	1	0	1	0	15	1
55	DF	(Turkey) Sabri Sarıoğlu	3	0	0	0	0	0	3	0
21	DF	(Mexico) Sergio Almaguer	4	0	1	0	3	0	8	0
51	DF	(Turkey) Ahmet Görkem Görk	1	0	0	0	0	0	1	0
35	DF	(Turkey) İlker Erbay	1	0	0	0	0	0	1	0
3	DF	(Turkey) Bülent Korkmaz (C)	30	1	2	0	6	0	38	1
2	DF	(Turkey) Vedat İnceefe	18	0	2	0	1	0	21	0
5	DF	(Turkey) Emre Aşık	17	0	2	0	4	0	23	0
20	DF	(Senegal) (Belgium) Mohamed Sarr	7	1	0	0	3	1	10	2
19	DF	(Turkey) Cihan Haspolatlı	23	2	2	1	3	1	28	4
57	DF	(Turkey) Hakan Ünsal	24	1	3	1	6	0	33	2
21	DF	(Turkey) (Netherlands) Suat Usta	5	0	1	0	0	0	6	0
12	DF	(Portugal) (Mozambique) Abel Xavier	11	0	1	0	0	0	12	0
10	MF	(Brazil) Felipe Jorge Loureiro	14	2	0	0	5	0	19	2
67	MF	(Turkey) Ergün Penbe	27	2	1	0	5	0	33	2
18	MF	(Turkey) Ayhan Akman	21	2	1	0	4	0	26	2
11	MF	(Turkey) Hasan Şaş	20	1	3	0	5	1	28	2
4	MF	(Brazil) João Batista	17	0	1	0	5	0	23	0
8	MF	(Turkey) Suat Kaya	10	1	0	0	3	0	13	1
20	MF	(Turkey) (Germany) Volkan Arslan	12	2	0	0	0	0	12	2
22	MF	(Turkey) Ümit Davala	23	1	3	0	5	0	31	1
52	MF	(Uruguay) Servet Gökçen	1	0	0	0	0	0	1	0
10	MF	(Israel) Haim Revivo	13	3	1	0	0	0	14	3
15	MF	(Turkey) Faruk Atalay	0	0	2	0	0	0	2	0
7	MF	(Turkey) (Germany) Berkant Göktan	11	3	3	0	0	0	14	3
17	FW	(Brazil) Fábio Pinto	18	0	3	0	4	1	25	1
14	FW	(Bosnia and Herzegovina) Elvir Baljić	16	2	1	0	4	0	21	2
6	FW	(Turkey) Arif Erdem	25	11	2	0	5	1	32	12
30	FW	(Turkey) Sedat Debreli	2	0	0	0	0	0	2	0
25	FW	(Brazil) Christian Corrêa Dionisio	11	3	0	0	4	0	15	3
21	FW	(Democratic Republic of the Congo) (France) Ali Lukunku	13	5	0	0	0	0	13	5
9	FW	(Turkey) (Germany) Ümit Karan	28	16	3	3	2	0	33	19

=== Players in / out ===
==== In ====
Pos.	Nat.	Name	Age	Moving from
DF	(Mexico)	Sergio Almaguer	33	Cruz Azul on loan
FW	(Brazil)	Christian Corrêa Dionisio	23	FC Girondins de Bordeaux
DF	(Senegal) (Belgium)	Mohamed Sarr	19	AC Milan on loan
MF	(Brazil)	Felipe Jorge Loureiro	25	CR Vasco da Gama
DF	(Turkey)	Hakan Ünsal	29	Blackburn Rovers FC
MF	(Turkey)	Ümit Davala	29	Inter Milan on loan
DF	(Turkey)	Mehmet Polat	24	Gaziantepspor
DF	(Turkey)	Cihan Haspolatlı	22	Kocaelispor
FW	(Brazil)	Fábio Pinto	21	SC Internacional
FW	(Bosnia and Herzegovina)	Elvir Baljić	28	Real Madrid CF on loan
DF	(Turkey)	Sabri Sarıoğlu	18	Galatasaray A2
MF	(Turkey)	İlker Erbay	18	Galatasaray A2
FW	(Turkey)	Sedat Debreli	18	Galatasaray A2
DF	(Portugal) (Mozambique)	Abel Xavier	30	Liverpool F.C. on loan
DF	(Turkey) (Netherlands)	Suat Usta	21	MVV Maastricht
MF	(Turkey) (Germany)	Volkan Arslan	24	Kocaelispor
MF	(Israel)	Haim Revivo	30	Fenerbahçe SK
FW	(Democratic Republic of the Congo) (France)	Ali Lukunku	26	Standard de Liège
GK	(Turkey)	Aykut Erçetin	20	VfB Stuttgart
MF	(Albania)	Klodian Duro	21	Samsunspor

==== Out ====
Pos.	Nat.	Name	Age	Moving to
MF	(Uruguay)	Andrés Fleurquin	27	Stade Rennais F.C.
MF	(Turkey)	Bülent Akın	24	Bolton Wanderers FC
DF	(Brazil)	Capone	30	Kocaelispor
DF	(Turkey)	Emrah Eren	23	Kocaelispor
MF	(Turkey)	Erhan Namlı	28	Elazığspor
MF	(Turkey)	Faruk Atalay	21	FC Kärnten
MF	(Colombia)	Gustavo Victoria	22	Gaziantepspor
DF	(Colombia)	Jersson González	28	River Plate CA
MF	(Albania)	Klodian Duro	21	Malatyaspor
FW	(Turkey)	Murat Sözkesen	27	Bursaspor
FW	(Romania)	Radu Niculescu	27	MKE Ankaragücü
DF	(France)	Sébastien Pérez	28	Olympique de Marseille
MF	(Turkey)	Sergen Yalçın	30	Beşiktaş JK
FW	(Turkey)	Serkan Aykut	27	Samsunspor
DF	(Mexico)	Sergio Almaguer	33	Cruz Azul
FW	(Brazil)	Christian Corrêa Dionisio	23	Grêmio FPA
DF	(Senegal) (Belgium)	Mohamed Sarr	19	AC Milan
MF	(Brazil)	Felipe Jorge Loureiro	25	CR Flamengo

== Süper Lig ==
=== Standings ===
Pos	Team	Pld	W	D	L	GF	GA	GD	Pts	Qualification or relegation
1	Beşiktaş (C)	34	26	7	1	63	21	+42	85	Qualification to Champions League group stage
2	Galatasaray	34	24	5	5	61	27	+34	77	Qualification to Champions League third qualifying round
3	Gençlerbirliği	34	19	9	6	76	40	+36	66	Qualification to UEFA Cup first round
4	Gaziantepspor	34	16	9	9	61	41	+20	57	Qualification to UEFA Cup first round
5	Malatyaspor	34	14	10	10	56	45	+11	52	Qualification to UEFA Cup first round

Rules for classification: 1) points; 2) goal difference; 3) number of goals scored.
(C) Champions

== Türkiye Kupası ==
Kick-off listed in local time (EET)

=== Second round ===
4 December 2002 1	Yimpaş Yozgatspor	1–3	Galatasaray SK	Yozgat
13:00 EET	Mustafa Özsöğüt 51', pen'	(Report)	Cihan Haspolatlı 19'; Hakan Ünsal 25'; Ümit Karan 64'	Stadium: Yozgat Şehir Stadı; Referee: Hamza Mısır

=== Third round ===
18 December 2002 1	Galatasaray SK	1–0	MKE Ankaragücü	Istanbul
20:00 EET	Ümit Karan 32'	(Report)		Stadium: Ali Sami Yen Stadı; Referee: Serdar Tatlı

=== Quarter-final ===
4 March 2003 1	Galatasaray SK	1–2	Malatyaspor	Istanbul
20:00 EET	Ümit Karan 66'	(Report)	Ziya Şahin 18'; Fazlı Ulusoy 44'	Stadium: Ali Sami Yen Stadı; Referee: Bülent Uzun

== UEFA Champions League ==
=== Group stage ===
Pos	Team	Pld	W	D	L	GF	GA	GD	Pts	Qualification
1	(Spain) Barcelona	6	6	0	0	13	4	+9	18	Advance to second group stage
2	(Russia) Lokomotiv Moscow	6	2	1	3	5	7	−2	7	Advance to second group stage
3	(Belgium) Club Brugge	6	1	2	3	5	7	−2	5	Transfer to UEFA Cup
4	(Turkey) Galatasaray	6	1	1	4	5	10	−5	4	

Source: RSSSF

18 September 2002 1	FC Lokomotiv Moscow	0–2	Galatasaray SK	Moscow
21:45 EET		Report	Mohamed Sarr 72'; Arif Erdem 81'	Stadium: Lokomotiv Stadium; Referee: (Switzerland) Massimo Busacca

24 September 2002 2	Galatasaray SK	0–2	FC Barcelona	Istanbul
21:45 EET		Report	Patrick Kluivert 26'; Luis Enrique 58'	Stadium: Ali Sami Yen Stadı; Referee: (Italy) Galatasaray SK

1 October 2002 3	Galatasaray SK	0–0	Club Brugge K.V.	Istanbul
21:45 EET		Report		Stadium: Ali Sami Yen Stadı; Referee: (France) Eric Poulat

23 October 2002 4	Club Brugge K.V.	3–1	Galatasaray SK	Bruges
21:45 EET	Sandy Martens 45'; Gert Verheyen 72'; Bengt Sæternes 90'	Report	Fábio Pinto 56'	Stadium: Jan Breydel Stadium; Referee: (Italy) Massimo De Santis

29 October 2001 5	Galatasaray SK	1–2	FC Lokomotiv Moscow	Istanbul
21:45 EET	Hasan Şaş 73'	Report	Dmitri Loskov 70'; Vadim Evseev 75'	Stadium: Ali Sami Yen Stadı; Referee: (Germany) Wolfgang Stark

13 November 2002 6	FC Barcelona	3–1	Galatasaray SK	Barcelona
21:45 EET	Daniel García Lara 10'; Gerard López 44'; Geovanni 56'	Report	Cihan Haspolatlı 20'	Stadium: Camp Nou; Referee: (Netherlands) Dick van Egmond

== Friendlies ==
31 July 2002 1	Galatasaray SK	2–0	Olympiacos F.C.	Istanbul
20:30 EET	Berkant Göktan 23'; Arif Erdem 90'	(Report)		Stadium: Atatürk Olimpiyat Stadı; Attendance: 79,414; Referee: Ali Aydın

== Attendance ==
Competition	Av. Att.	Total Att.
1. Lig	-	-
Türkiye Kupası	-	-
Champions League	19,760	59,279
Total	-	-

- Sold season tickets: 7,547
