= 2005–06 Galatasaray S.K. season =

Galatasaray
2005–06 season
- President: Özhan Canaydın
- Head coach: Eric Gerets
- Stadium: Ali Sami Yen Stadı
- Süper Lig: 1st
- Turkish Cup: Quarter-finals
- UEFA Cup: First round
- Top goalscorer: League: Necati Ateş (18); All: Necati Ateş (22)
Home colours	Away colours	Third colours

The 2005–06 season was Galatasaray foot ball club's 102nd in existence and the 48th consecutive season in the Süper Lig. This article shows statistics of the club's players in the season, and also lists all matches that the club have played in the season. The season also saw a first in Turkish football; for the first time in history the team that entered the last week first, Fenerbahçe, failed to win the title. Fenerbahçe and Galatasaray went into the last week deadlocked at 80 points and Fenerbahçe had a better head-to-head record. Fenerbahçe needed only a win to defend their title and win their third successive championship. However, a 1-1 draw to Denizlispor combined with a 3-0 Galatasaray win against Kayserispor gave Galatasaray their 16th league title.

== Squad statistics ==
No.	Pos.	Name	Süper Lig		Türkiye Kupası		UEFA Cup		Total	
No.	Pos.	Name	Apps	Goals	Apps	Goals	Apps	Goals	Apps	Goals
1	GK	(Colombia) Faryd Mondragón	34	0	2	0	2	0	38	0
17	GK	(Turkey) Fevzi Elmas	0	0	0	0	0	0	0	0
12	GK	(Turkey) Aykut Erçetin	0	0	4	0	0	0	4	0
-	DF	(Turkey) Uğur Demirok	1	0	0	0	0	0	1	0
33	DF	(Turkey) Uğur Uçar	17	0	2	1	2	0	21	1
55	DF	(Turkey) Sabri Sarıoğlu	21	3	4	1	1	0	26	4
5	DF	(Turkey) Orhan Ak	22	0	5	0	1	0	28	0
2	DF	(Croatia) Stjepan Tomas	32	0	5	0	2	0	39	0
3	DF	(Turkey) Emre Aşık	3	0	0	0	0	0	3	0
4	DF	(Cameroon) Rigobert Song	29	1	4	0	2	0	35	1
19	DF	(Turkey) Cihan Haspolatlı	27	3	5	0	1	0	33	3
6	DF	(Turkey) Yalçın Ayhan	4	0	1	0	0	0	5	0
25	DF	(Turkey) Ferhat Öztorun	9	0	2	0	0	0	11	0
26	MF	(Turkey) Aydın Yılmaz	12	1	2	1	0	0	14	2
7	MF	(Cameroon) Alioum Saidou	23	0	1	0	2	0	26	0
23	MF	(Turkey) Zafer Şakar	2	0	0	0	1	0	3	0
67	MF	(Turkey) Ergün Penbe	15	0	3	0	1	0	19	0
18	MF	(Turkey) Ayhan Akman	17	2	5	1	0	0	22	3
11	MF	(Turkey) Hasan Şaş	26	2	4	0	2	0	32	2
8	MF	(Czech Republic) Marek Heinz	18	3	4	1	2	0	24	4
20	MF	(Turkey) Volkan Arslan	17	2	4	0	1	0	22	2
-	MF	(Turkey) Altan Aksoy	9	1	2	0	0	0	11	1
24	MF	(Turkey) Mehmet Güven	1	0	1	0	0	0	2	0
22	MF	(Serbia and Montenegro) Saša Ilić	30	12	4	0	0	0	34	12
58	FW	(Turkey) Hasan Kabze	18	6	4	1	1	0	23	7
27	FW	(Turkey) Özgürcan Özcan	1	0	2	1	0	0	3	1
10	FW	(Turkey) Necati Ateş	32	18	5	4	2	0	39	22
9	FW	(Turkey) Hakan Şükür (C)	31	10	4	2	2	1	37	13
99	FW	(Turkey) Ümit Karan	24	16	4	2	2	0	30	18

== Süper Lig ==
=== Standings ===
Pos	Team	Pld	W	D	L	GF	GA	GD	Pts	Qualification or relegation
1	Galatasaray (C)	34	26	5	3	82	34	+48	83	Qualification to Champions League third qualifying round
2	Fenerbahçe	34	25	6	3	90	34	+56	81	Qualification to Champions League second qualifying round
3	Beşiktaş	34	15	9	10	52	39	+13	54	Qualification to UEFA Cup first round (Note: Beşiktaş have won the 2005–06 Turkish Cup competition and thus are qualified for the first round of the UEFA Cup.)
4	Trabzonspor	34	15	7	12	51	42	+9	52	Qualification to UEFA Cup second qualifying round
5	Kayserispor	34	15	6	13	59	42	+17	51 (Note: Kayserispor were ahead of Gençlerbirliği on head-to-head goal difference: Kayserispor–Gençlerbirliği 2–0, Gençlerbirliği–Kayserispor 3–2.)	Qualification to Intertoto Cup second round

Rules for classification: 1) points; 2) goal difference; 3) number of goals scored.
(C) Champions

=== Matches ===
7 August 2005 1	Galatasaray	2–1	Konyaspor	Istanbul
20:00 TRT		Report		Stadium: Ali Sami Yen Stadium

12 August 2005 2	Ankaragücü	0–1	Galatasaray	Ankara
20:00 TRT		Report		Stadium: Ankara 19 Mayıs Stadium

21 August 2005 3	Galatasaray	5–2	Malatyaspor	Istanbul
21:15 TRT		Report		Stadium: Ali Sami Yen Stadium

26 August 2005 4	Gaziantepspor	2–2	Galatasaray	Gaziantep
20:00 TRT		Report		Stadium: Kamil Ocak Stadium

11 September 2005 5	Galatasaray	2–0	Sivasspor	Istanbul
20:00 TRT		Report		Stadium: Ali Sami Yen Stadium

18 September 2005 6	Vestel Manisaspor	1–4	Galatasaray	İzmir
17:30 TRT		Report		Stadium: İzmir Atatürk Stadium

25 September 2005 7	Samsunspor	1–2	Galatasaray	Samsun
20:00 TRT		Report		Stadium: Samsun 19 Mayıs Stadium

2 October 2005 8	Galatasaray	4–1	Trabzonspor	Istanbul
21:00 TRT		Report		Stadium: Ali Sami Yen Stadium

15 October 2005 9	Kayseri Erciyesspor	1–2	Galatasaray	Kayseri
17:00 TRT		Report		Stadium: Kayseri Atatürk Stadium

22 October 2005 10	Galatasaray	1–1	Denizlispor	Istanbul
20:00 TRT		Report		Stadium: Ali Sami Yen Stadium

30 October 2005 11	Gençlerbirliği	2–1	Galatasaray	Ankara
14:00 TRT		Report		Stadium: Ankara 19 Mayıs Stadium

4 November 2005 12	Galatasaray	2–0	Diyarbakırspor	Istanbul
20:00 TRT		Report		Stadium: Ali Sami Yen Stadium

20 November 2005 13	Çaykur Rizespor	0–3	Galatasaray	Rize
19:00 TRT		Report		Stadium: Rize Atatürk Stadium

27 November 2005 14	Galatasaray	0–1	Fenerbahçe	Istanbul
19:00 TRT		Report		Stadium: Ali Sami Yen Stadium

3 December 2005 15	Ankaraspor	1–2	Galatasaray	Ankara
19:00 TRT		Report		Stadium: Ankara 19 Mayıs Stadium

10 December 2005 16	Galatasaray	3–2	Beşiktaş	Istanbul
19:00 TRT		Report		Stadium: Ali Sami Yen Stadium

16 December 2005 17	Kayserispor	1–3	Galatasaray	Kayseri
20:00 TRT		Report		Stadium: Kayseri Atatürk Stadium

22 January 2006 18	Konyaspor	0–1	Galatasaray	Konya
19:00 TRT		Report		Stadium: Konya Atatürk Stadium

29 March 2006 19	Galatasaray	2–0	Ankaragücü	Istanbul
20:10 TRT		Report		Stadium: Ali Sami Yen Stadium

5 February 2006 20	Malatyaspor	1–1	Galatasaray	Malatya
19:00 TRT		Report		Stadium: Malatya İnönü Stadium

12 February 2006 21	Galatasaray	6–0	Gaziantepspor	Istanbul
19:00 TRT		Report		Stadium: Ali Sami Yen Stadium

19 February 2006 22	Sivasspor	0–0	Galatasaray	Sivas
19:00 TRT		Report		Stadium: Sivas 4 Eylül Stadium

25 February 2006 23	Galatasaray	4–2	Vestel Manisaspor	Istanbul
19:00 TRT		Report		Stadium: Ali Sami Yen Stadium

4 March 2006 24	Galatasaray	3–2	Samsunspor	Istanbul
19:00 TRT		Report		Stadium: Ali Sami Yen Stadium

12 March 2006 25	Trabzonspor	1–1	Galatasaray	Trabzon
19:00 TRT		Report		Stadium: Hüseyin Avni Aker Stadium

19 March 2006 26	Galatasaray	4–2	Kayseri Erciyesspor	Istanbul
19:00 TRT		Report		Stadium: Ali Sami Yen Stadium

25 March 2006 27	Denizlispor	1–2	Galatasaray	Denizli
19:00 TRT		Report		Stadium: Denizli Atatürk Stadium

1 April 2006 28	Galatasaray	3–0	Gençlerbirliği	Istanbul
20:45 TRT		Report		Stadium: Ali Sami Yen Stadium

7 April 2006 29	Diyarbakırspor	1–3	Galatasaray	İzmir
20:00 TRT		Report		Stadium: İzmir Atatürk Stadium

16 April 2006 30	Galatasaray	4–2	Çaykur Rizespor	Istanbul
19:00 TRT		Report		Stadium: Ali Sami Yen Stadium

22 April 2006 31	Fenerbahçe	4–0	Galatasaray	Istanbul
19:00 TRT		Report		Stadium: Şükrü Saracoğlu Stadium

29 April 2006 32	Galatasaray	4–0	Ankaraspor	Istanbul
19:00 TRT		Report		Stadium: Ali Sami Yen Stadium

7 May 2006 33	Beşiktaş	1–2	Galatasaray	Istanbul
19:00 TRT		Report		Stadium: BJK İnönü Stadium

14 May 2006 34	Galatasaray	3–0	Kayserispor	Istanbul
19:00 TRT		Report		Stadium: Ali Sami Yen Stadium

== Türkiye Kupası ==
=== Group stage ===
Pos	Team	Pld	W	D	L	GF	GA	GD	Pts
1	Galatasaray	4	3	1	0	11	1	+10	10
2	Malatyaspor	4	3	1	0	5	1	+4	10
3	Diyarbakırspor	4	2	0	2	6	4	+2	6
4	Giresunspor	4	1	0	3	3	10	−7	3
5	Mersin İdman Yurdu	4	0	0	4	2	11	−9	0

Source: tff.org.tr

27 October 2005 1	Galatasaray SK	4–0	Mersin İdmanyurdu SK	Istanbul
20:00 EET	Necati Ateş 52', 86pen' Uğur Uçar 70'; Özgürcan Özcan 88'	(Report)		Stadium: Ali Sami Yen Stadı; Referee: Mustafa Kamil Abitoğlu

20 December 2005 2	Malatyaspor	1–1	Galatasaray SK	Malatya
20:00 EET	Balázs Tóth 6'	(Report)	Hasan Kabze 39'	Stadium: Malatya İnönü Stadı; Referee: Cem Papila

2 February 2006 3	Galatasaray SK	5–0	Giresunspor	Istanbul
20:00 EET	Ümit Karan 27'; Necati Ateş 61'; Hakan Şükür 78'; Aydın Yılmaz 82'; Sabri Sarıoğlu 85'	(Report)		Stadium: Ali Sami Yen Stadı; Referee: Vedat Yüksel

15 February 2006 4	Diyarbakırspor	0–1	Galatasaray SK	Diyarbakır
20:00 EET		(Report)	Marek Heinz 84'	Stadium: Diyarbakır Atatürk Stadı; Referee: Zafer Önder İpek

=== Quarter-final ===
8 March 2006 1	Fenerbahçe SK	2–1	Galatasaray SK	Istanbul
20:00 EET	Fábio Luciano 24'; Alexsandro de Souza 85'	(Report)	Ümit Karan 56'	Stadium: Şükrü Saracoğlu Stadı; Referee: Cüneyt Çakır

22 March 2006 2	Galatasaray SK	3–2	Fenerbahçe SK	Istanbul
20:00 EET	Ayhan Akman 11'; Necati Ateş 35'; Hakan Şükür 76'	(Report)	Tuncay 7'; Stephen Appiah 72'	Stadium: Ali Sami Yen Stadı; Referee: Bülent Demirlek

== UEFA Cup ==
=== First round ===
15 September 2005 1	Tromsø IL	1–0	Galatasaray SK	Tromsø
11:30 EET	Tamás Szekeres 77'	(Report)		Stadium: Alfheim Stadion; Referee: (Austria) Gerald Lehner

29 September 2005 2	Galatasaray SK	1–1	Tromsø IL	Istanbul
20:45 EET	Hakan Şükür 79'	(Report)	Stephen Ademolu 32'	Stadium: Ali Sami Yen Stadı; Attendance: 20,000; Referee: (Portugal) Antonio Manuel Almeida Costa

== Friendlies ==
12 July 2005	Roda JC Kerkrade	3–2	Galatasaray SK
20:00	Sekou Cissé 9', 18'; Dirk Jan Derksen 90p'	(Report)	Necati Ateş 54'; Ümit Karan 67p'

31 July 2005	Bursaspor	2–0	Galatasaray SK
20:30	Serdar Topraktepe 6p' Veli Acar 81'	(Report)

7 January 2006 Efes Pilsen Kupası	Galatasaray SK	5–3	Borussia Dortmund	Antalya
20:00	Stjepan Tomas 36'; Ümit Karan 43'; Necati Ateş 50p', 57'; Hasan Şaş 80'	(Report)	Salvatore Gambino 53', 69', 71'

9 January 2006 Efes Pilsen Kupası	Beşiktaş JK	1–1	Galatasaray SK	Antalya
20:00	İbrahim Akın 9'	(Report)	Saša Ilić 56'

== Attendance ==
Competition	Av. Att.	Total Att.
Süper Lig	-	-
Türkiye Kupası	-	-
UEFA Cup	20,000	20,000
Total	-	-
