= Nkenglikok =

Village in Cameroon

Coordinates: 3°46′07″N 11°12′36″E

Nkenglikok is a town in southern Cameroon, in the department of Nyong-et-Kéllé.

Cameroonian footballer Rigobert Song was born there. Song holds the record for the most caps for the Cameroon national team with 137.
