= Necati Ateş =

Turkish footballer (born 1980)

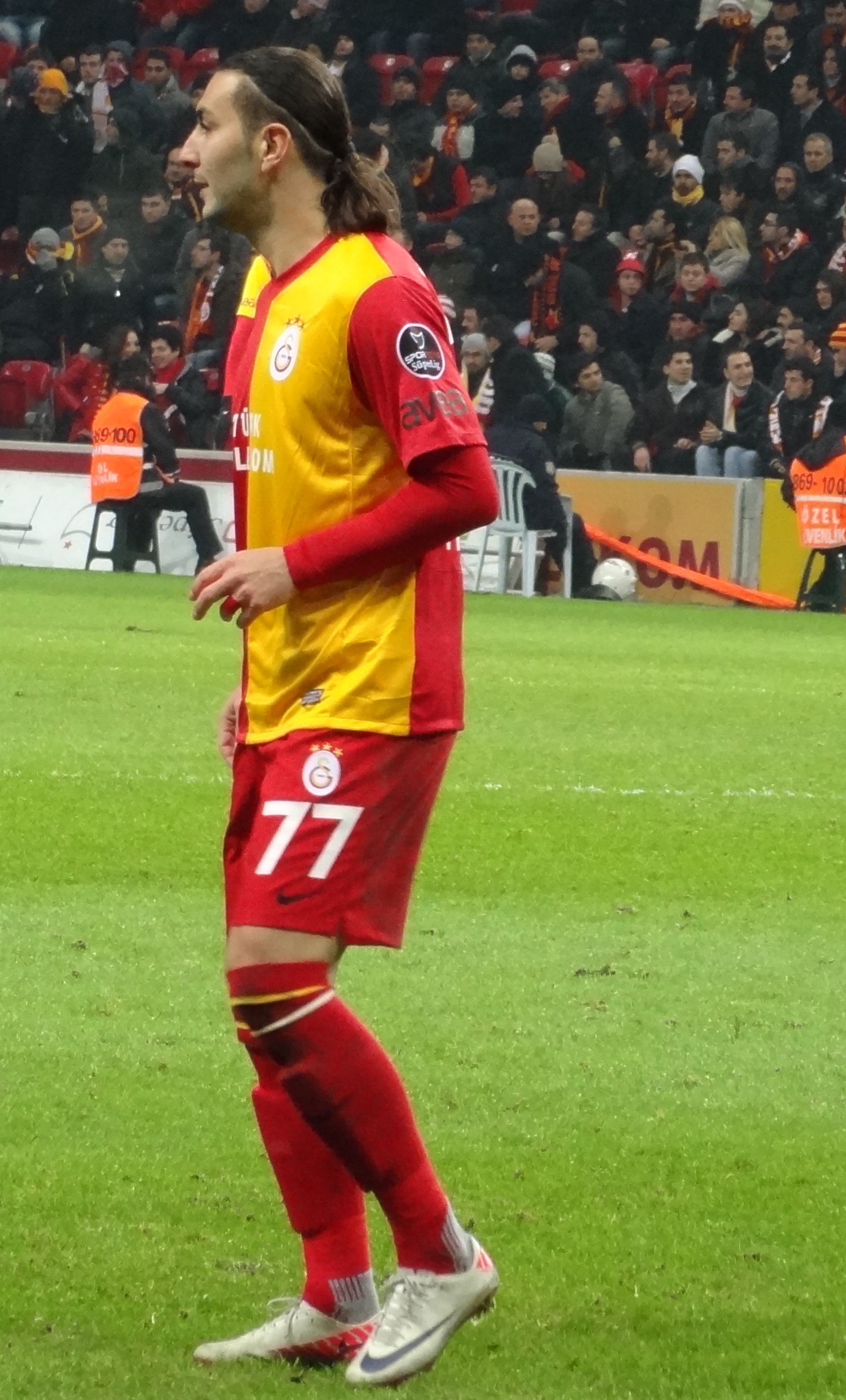
- Ateş in action for Galatasaray in 2012

Personal information
- Full name: Necati Ateş
- Date of birth: 3 January 1980 (age 46)
- Place of birth: İzmir, Turkey
- Height: 1.82 m (5 ft 11 1/2 in)
- Position: Forward

Team information
- Current team: Panathinaikos (assistant manager)

Youth career
- 1994–1997: Narlıdere Esnafspor
- 1997: Altay

Senior career*
| Years | Team | Apps | (Gls) |
| 1997–2001 | Altay | 59 | (22) |
| 2000 | → Aydınspor (loan) | 6 | (1) |
| 2002–2004 | Adanaspor | 81 | (41) |
| 2004–2009 | Galatasaray | 99 | (48) |
| 2007 | → Ankaraspor (loan) | 14 | (3) |
| 2008 | → İstanbul BB (loan) | 12 | (8) |
| 2008–2009 | → Real Sociedad (loan) | 35 | (1) |
| 2009–2012 | Antalyaspor | 76 | (31) |
| 2012 | Galatasaray | 15 | (8) |
| 2012–2014 | Eskişehirspor | 60 | (16) |
| 2014–2015 | Erciyesspor | 22 | (2) |
| 2015–2016 | Karşıyaka | 20 | (3) |
| Total | | 499 | (184) |

International career
| 1998 | Turkey U17 | 2 | (0) |
| 1998 | Turkey U18 | 9 | (1) |
| 1999 | Turkey U19 | 3 | (0) |
| 2001 | Turkey U20 | 3 | (0) |
| 2001 | Turkey U21 | 1 | (0) |
| 2002–2004 | Turkey A2 | 6 | (3) |
| 2003–2006 | Turkey | 19 | (5) |

Managerial career
- 2018–2022: Galatasaray (assistant)
- 2023–: Panathinaikos (assistant)
- * Club domestic league appearances and goals as of 7 February 2016

Necati Ateş (Turkish pronunciation: [nedʒaːti ateʃ]; born 3 January 1980) is a Turkish former professional footballer who played as a forward. He is the current assistant manager of Greek Super League club Panathinaikos.

== Club career ==
Born in İzmir, Ateş made his professional debut with Altay S.K. and Adanaspor, scoring for both at an impressive rate. In 2004, he signed with Süper Lig giants Galatasaray SK.

In 2005–06, Ateş played an integral part in Galatasaray's 16th national championship conquest. However, on 25 July 2007, club manager Karl-Heinz Feldkamp officially reported to the board he was not planning to use the player in the upcoming season, which resulted in a transfer list; he split (always on loan) the campaign between Ankaraspor and Istanbul Büyükşehir Belediyespor, netting 11 goals in total.

For 2008–09 another loan ensued, as Ateş joined Real Sociedad. Though heavily featured, he only managed to score once and the Basque side finished sixth, thus failing to return to La Liga.

In the 2009 summer, after more than 100 official matches and over 50 goals, Galtasaray released Ateş. He immediately joined fellow league club Antalyaspor, ranking joint-fourth in the topscorers' list as it finished ninth.

On the last day of the January 2012 transfer window, Ateş signed a six-month contract with old acquaintance Galatasaray for a fee of €250,000. He scored his first goal in his second spell on 4 February in a 2–1 win at Gaziantepspor, and went on to have an important offensive role as the team won the domestic league.

== International career ==
Ateş made his Turkey national team debut during the 2003 FIFA Confederations Cup, playing three times for the third-placed nation and going scoreless in the process. His first goal came on 26 March 2005, in a 2–0 home win against Albania for the 2006 FIFA World Cup qualifiers. He also netted in the turbulent playoff against Switzerland, in November.

== Career statistics ==
As of 17 July 2013

=== Club ===
Appearances and goals by club, season and competition
| Club | Season | League | | | National cup (Note: Includes Turkish Cup, Copa del Rey) | | Europe | | Other | | Total | |
| Club | Season | Division | Apps | Goals | Apps | Goals | Apps | Goals | Apps | Goals | Apps | Goals |
|---|---|---|---|---|---|---|---|---|---|---|---|---|
| Altay | 1997–98 | 1.Lig | 9 | 2 | 1 | 0 | – | | – | | 10 | 2 |
| Altay | 1998–99 | 1.Lig | 3 | 0 | 1 | 0 | – | | – | | 4 | 0 |
| Altay | 1999–2000 | 1.Lig | 8 | 0 | 1 | 0 | – | | – | | 9 | 0 |
| Altay | 2000–01 | Turkish Second Football League | 35 | 19 | 1 | 0 | – | | – | | 36 | 19 |
| Altay | 2001–02 | Turkish Second Football League | 4 | 1 | 0 | 0 | – | | – | | 4 | 1 |
| Altay | Total | | 59 | 22 | 4 | 0 | – | | – | | 63 | 22 |
| Aydınspor (loan) | 1999–2000 | Turkish Second Football League | 6 | 1 | 0 | 0 | – | | – | | 6 | 1 |
| Adanaspor | 2001–02 | Turkish Second Football League | 32 | 17 | 4 | 0 | – | | – | | 36 | 17 |
| Adanaspor | 2002–03 | Süper Lig | 33 | 19 | 1 | 0 | – | | – | | 34 | 19 |
| Adanaspor | 2003–04 | Süper Lig | 16 | 5 | 1 | 0 | – | | – | | 17 | 5 |
| Adanaspor | Total | | 81 | 41 | 6 | 0 | – | | – | | 87 | 41 |
| Galatasaray | 2003–04 | Süper Lig | 14 | 9 | 0 | 0 | 2 (Note: Appearances in UEFA Cup) | 0 | – | | 16 | 9 |
| Galatasaray | 2004–05 | Süper Lig | 33 | 15 | 5 | 4 | – | | – | | 38 | 19 |
| Galatasaray | 2005–06 | Süper Lig | 32 | 18 | 5 | 4 | 2 | 0 | – | | 39 | 22 |
| Galatasaray | 2006–07 | Süper Lig | 20 | 6 | 5 | 1 | 4 (Note: Appearances in UEFA Champions League) | 1 | 1 (Note: Appearance in Turkish Super Cup) | 0 | 30 | 8 |
| Galatasaray | Total | | 99 | 48 | 15 | 9 | 8 | 1 | 1 | 0 | 123 | 58 |
| Ankaraspor (loan) | 2007–08 | Süper Lig | 14 | 3 | 2 | 1 | – | | – | | 16 | 4 |
| İstanbul BB (loan) | 2007–08 | Süper Lig | 12 | 8 | 0 | 0 | – | | – | | 12 | 8 |
| Real Sociedad (loan) | 2008–09 | Segunda División | 35 | 1 | | | – | | – | | 35 | 1 |
| Antalyaspor | 2009–10 | Süper Lig | 29 | 13 | 8 | 5 | – | | – | | 37 | 18 |
| Antalyaspor | 2010–11 | Süper Lig | 28 | 13 | 3 | 0 | – | | – | | 31 | 13 |
| Antalyaspor | 2011–12 | Süper Lig | 19 | 5 | 0 | 0 | – | | – | | 19 | 5 |
| Antalyaspor | Total | | 76 | 31 | 11 | 5 | – | | – | | 87 | 36 |
| Galatasaray | 2011–12 | Süper Lig | 15 | 8 | 1 | 0 | – | | – | | 16 | 8 |
| Galatasaray | 2012–13 | Süper Lig | 0 | 0 | 0 | 0 | 0 | 0 | 1 | 0 | 1 | 0 |
| Galatasaray | Total | | 15 | 8 | 1 | 0 | 0 | 0 | 1 | 0 | 17 | 8 |
| Eskişehirspor | 2012–13 | Süper Lig | 0 | 0 | 0 | 0 | – | | – | | 0 | 0 |
| Career total | | | 397 | 163 | 39 | 15 | 10 | 1 | 2 | 0 | 446 | 180 |

=== International ===
Turkey
| Year | Apps | Goals |
| 2003 | 3 | 0 |
| 2004 | 3 | 0 |
| 2005 | 7 | 2 |
| 2006 | 6 | 3 |
| Total | 19 | 5 |

International goals Scores and results table. Turkey's goal tally first:

| # | Date | Venue | Opponent | Score | Result | Competition |
|---|---|---|---|---|---|---|
| 1. | 26 March 2005 | BJK İnönü, Istanbul, Turkey | Albania | 1–0 | 1–0 | 2006 World Cup qualification |
| 2. | 16 November 2005 | Şükrü Saracoğlu, Istanbul, Turkey | Switzerland | 3–1 | 4–2 | 2006 World Cup qualification – Playoffs |
| 3. | 24 April 2006 | Fenixstadion, Genk, Belgium | Belgium | 1–0 | 3–3 | Friendly |
| 4. | 31 May 2006 | Stadion am Bieberer Berg, Offenbach am Main, Germany | Saudi Arabia | 1–0 | 1–0 | Friendly |
| 5. | 24 April 2006 | Wagner and Partners, Sittard, Netherlands | Angola | 1–1 | 3–2 | Friendly |

== Honours ==
Galatasaray

- Süper Lig: 2005–06, 2011–12
- Turkish Cup: 2004–05
- Turkish Super Cup: 2012

Turkey

- FIFA Confederations Cup Third place: 2003
