= Ümit Karan =

Turkish footballer and manager

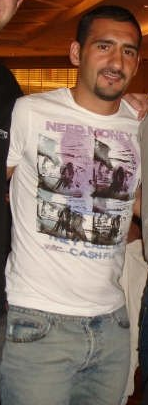
- Karan in 2008

Personal information
- Date of birth: 1 October 1976 (age 50)
- Place of birth: West Berlin, West Germany
- Height: 1.81 m (5 ft 11 1/2 in)
- Position: Striker

Team information
- Current team: Menemenspor (manager)

Youth career
- SC Minerva 93
- Hertha Zehlendorf

Senior career*
Years	Team	Apps	(Gls)
1995–1996	Türkiyemspor Berlin		
1996–2001	Gençlerbirliği	136	(50)
2001–2009	Galatasaray	170	(72)
2005	→ Ankaraspor (loan)	12	(5)
2009–2011	Eskişehirspor	41	(11)

International career
1999–2007	Turkey	10	(3)

Managerial career
- 2018–2019: Shkupi
- 2020: Shkupi
- 2021: Menemenspor
- * Club domestic league appearances and goals

Ümit Karan (born 1 October 1976) is a Turkish football manager and former player who is currently the manager of Menemenspor.

He played for Gençlerbirliği S.K., Ankaraspor, Galatasaray and Eskişehirspor. He made his international debut for Turkey in 1999, and earned a total of ten caps, scoring three goals.

== Club career ==
After playing for Gençlerbirliği for five seasons and scoring 91 goals, Ümit moved to Galatasaray at the start of the 2001–02 season and was a key player in Mircea Lucescu's squad as the main striker after Mario Jardel's departure.

During the 2004–05 season, he was loaned to Ankaraspor by manager Gheorghe Hagi due to his dip in form. However, Ümit made a strong return for the 2005–06 season with Galatasaray's new manager, Eric Gerets. Getting along well with Gerets and his playing style, Ümit scored 81 goals in 18 matches at the start of the season. But in early 2006, Umit's season was cut short by a knee injury, which kept him out of the game for six months.

At the start of the 2006–07 season, Ümit regained his place on the team after the injury layoff, scoring his 100th goal in the Süper Lig on 18 September 2006, against Beşiktaş.

Ümit has great finishing ability, and he is usually in pursuit of sensational goals, particularly with volleys and bicycle kicks. His most sensational goal is arguably the one against Vestel Manisaspor. Ümit latched onto a 40-meter pass just inside the box, struck a one-time shot with his right foot, and curled it around the goalkeeper. He also possesses good pace, stamina and strength. He has had his share of problems with his former Galatasaray managers, Fatih Terim and Gheorghe Hagi. On 24 June 2009 he was fired from his 2010 contract with Galatasaray, and he signed a contract with Eskisehirspor for three years.

== Managerial career ==
On 4 October 2018 Karan accepted an offer to become the manager of FK Shkupi. He took over the team who were struggling to meet expectations and found themselves in 9th. His first game in charge was on 21 October 2018, which Shkupi won 2–1 against fellow underperformers, Sileks. During his first season in charge of the Skopje based club, he managed to achieve a 4th place finish in the league and thus secured a Europa League qualifying slot. On 26 August 2019 Karan left his post as manager of Shkupi. His final game in charge was a 2–2 draw with Renova. On 30 September 2020 Karan re-joined Shkupi as manager on a one-year contract.

== Legal issues ==
Karan was tried on charges of sexual assault for an incident in 2015 and sentenced to 1 year and 8 months in prison in 2025.

== Career statistics ==
As of 15 May 2011

Club	Season	League			Turkish Cup		Europe		Total	
Club	Season	Division	Apps	Goals	Apps	Goals	Apps	Goals	Apps	Goals
Gençlerbirliği	1996–97	Süper Lig	13	3	1	0	–		14	3
Gençlerbirliği	1997–98	Süper Lig	30	2	3	2	–		33	4
Gençlerbirliği	1998–99	Süper Lig	31	14	3	1	–		34	15
Gençlerbirliği	1999–2000	Süper Lig	33	18	1	1	–		34	19
Gençlerbirliği	2000–01	Süper Lig	29	13	5	7	–		34	20
Gençlerbirliği	Total		136	50	13	11	–		49	61
Galatasaray	2001–02	Süper Lig	28	7	1	0	14 (Note: Appearances in UEFA Champions League)	7	43	14
Galatasaray	2002–03	Süper Lig	28	16	3	3	2	0	33	19
Galatasaray	2003–04	Süper Lig	8	1	2	1	4	0	14	2
Galatasaray	2004–05	Süper Lig	6	2	0	0	–		6	2
Galatasaray	2005–06	Süper Lig	24	17	4	2	2 (Note: Appearances in UEFA Cup)	0	30	19
Galatasaray	2006–07	Süper Lig	28	18	5	2	6	2	39	22
Galatasaray	2007–08	Süper Lig	30	11	7	3	5	3	42	17
Galatasaray	2008–09	Süper Lig	18	0	5	2	5 (Note: One appearance in UEFA Champions League, four appearances and one goal in UEFA Cup)	1	28	3
Galatasaray	Total		170	72	27	13	38	13	235	98
Ankaraspor (loan)	2004–05	Süper Lig	12	5	0	0	–		12	5
Eskişehirspor	2009–10	Süper Lig	24	7	2	1	–		26	8
Eskişehirspor	2010–11	Süper Lig	17	4	0	0	–		17	4
Eskişehirspor	Total		41	11	2	1	–		43	12
Career total			359	138	40	25	38	13	437	176

== Honours ==
Gençlerbirliği

- Turkish Cup: 2000–01

Galatasaray

- Süper Lig: 2001–02, 2005–06, 2007–08

Sporting positions
Preceded by Hakan Şükür	Galatasaray captain 2008–2009	Succeeded by Arda Turan
