= Murat Önür =

Turkish footballer

Personal information
- Full name: Murat Önür
- Date of birth: February 15, 1981 (age 45)
- Place of birth: Afşin, Turkey
- Height: 1.78 m (5 ft 10 in)
- Position: Left back

Youth career
- 1995–1997: Çanakkale Dardanelspor

Senior career*
| Years | Team | Apps | (Gls) |
| 1997–2006 | Çanakkale Dardanelspor | 167 | (2) |
| 2006–2008 | Mardinspor | 48 | (1) |
| 2008 | Diyarbakırspor | 17 | (1) |
| 2008–2010 | Eskişehirspor | 31 | (1) |
| 2011 | Boluspor | 10 | (0) |
| 2011–2013 | Denizlispor | 16 | (0) |
| 2013 | Kartalspor | 4 | (0) |

International career
| 1998–1999 | Turkey U17, Turkey U18 | 23 | (1) |
- * Club domestic league appearances and goals

Murat Önür (born February 15, 1981, in Afşin, Turkey) is a Turkish retired football player.
