= Rigobert Song =

Cameroonian footballer and manager (born 1976)

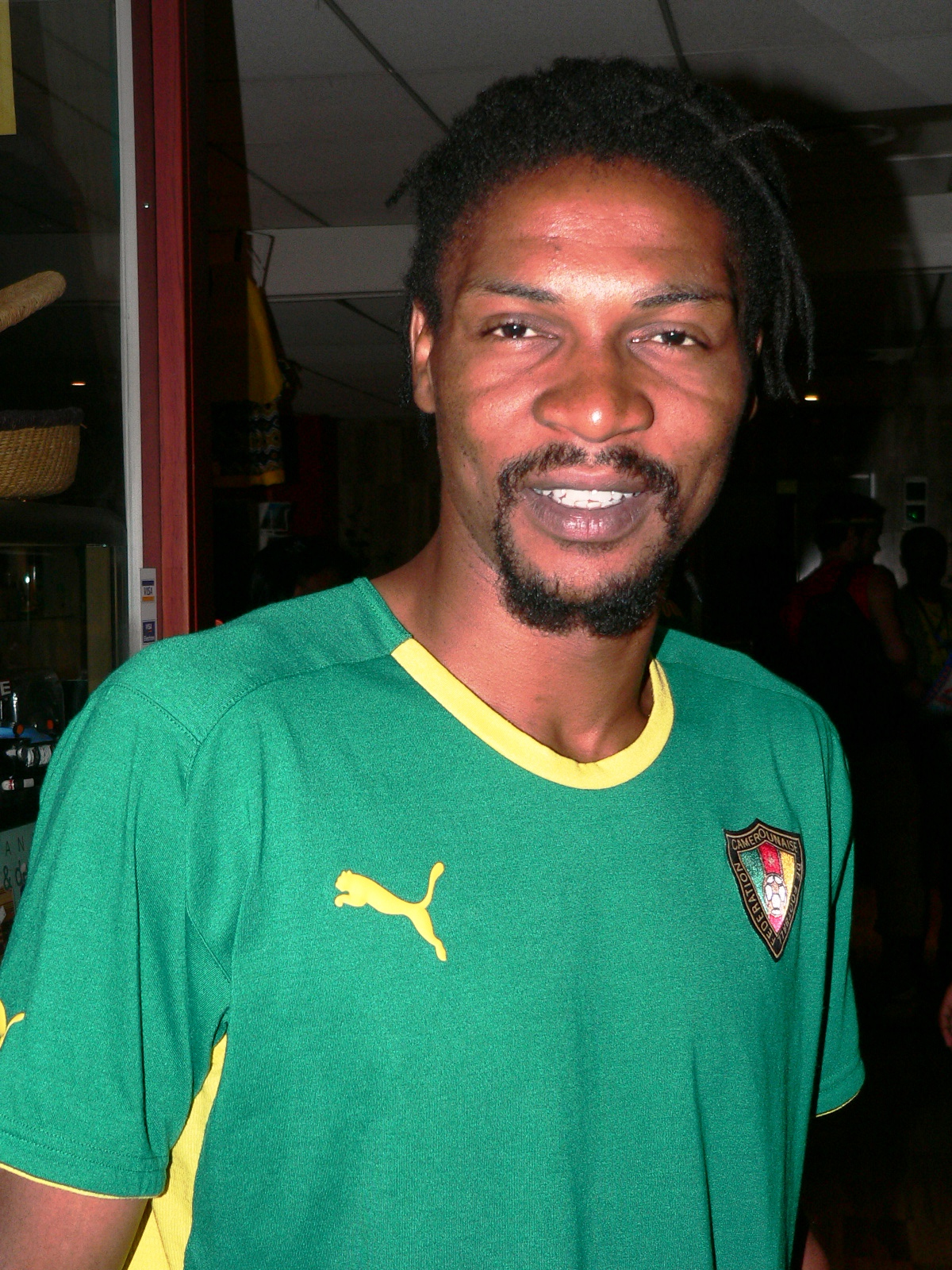
- Song with Cameroon in 2008

Personal information
- Full name: Rigobert Song Bahanag
- Date of birth: 1 July 1976 (age 50)
- Place of birth: Nkenglikok, Nyong-et-Kéllé, Cameroon
- Height: 1.85 m (6 ft 1 in)
- Position: Centre-back

Senior career*
Years	Team	Apps	(Gls)
1993–1998	Metz	123	(3)
1998	Salernitana	4	(1)
1999–2000	Liverpool	34	(0)
2000–2002	West Ham United	24	(0)
2001–2002	→ 1. FC Köln (loan)	16	(0)
2002–2004	Lens	63	(3)
2004–2008	Galatasaray	104	(4)
2008–2010	Trabzonspor	46	(0)
Total		414	(11)

International career
1993–2010	Cameroon	137	(5)

Managerial career
- 2016–2018: Cameroon A
- 2017–2018: Cameroon (caretaker)
- 2018–2022: Cameroon U23
- 2022–2024: Cameroon
- 2025: Central African Republic
Medal record
Men's football
Representing Cameroon
Africa Cup of Nations
Winner	2000
Winner	2002
Runner-up	2008
FIFA Confederations Cup
Runner-up	2003
- * Club domestic league appearances and goals

Rigobert Song Bahanag (born 1 July 1976) is a Cameroonian professional football manager and former player who most recently managed the Central African Republic national team.

Known for his defensive skills, Song usually played as a centre-back, but could also operate at right-back. Internationally, he played at a record eight Africa Cup of Nations tournaments and served as captain in five (the ones he was not captain for were South Africa 1996, Burkina Faso 1998 and Angola 2010), a record, and holds the record of most consecutive games played in the tournament with 35 first team games. He has won two CAF Africa Cup of Nations titles in 2000 and 2002. In 2009, Song was dropped as Cameroon skipper by new coach Paul Le Guen, who eventually appointed Samuel Eto'o as the new captain, which later caused concerns, as Song had never been on the bench in more than eleven years for Cameroon. With 137 appearances, Song also holds the record of the most capped player in the history of the Cameroon national team and has played in four World Cups, in 1994, 1998, 2002 and 2010.

Song started his professional career with Metz and helped the club to win the Coupe de la Ligue in 1996. After appearing at the 1998 World Cup, he joined Salernitana, newly promoted to the top-flight Italian Serie A. In January 1999, he left Italy to start successive stints with Liverpool, West Ham United and 1. FC Köln, but after failing to hold down a first-team place, he returned to France to play for Lens. He stayed there until 2004, before moving on to Turkey, where he spent four years with Galatasaray, winning two Süper Lig titles and the Turkish Cup. Song then signed a contract with Trabzonspor in 2008, where he won another Turkish Cup and stayed until 2010.

Aside from Zinedine Zidane, Song is the only player to have been sent off in two different World Cups, once against Brazil in 1994 and against Chile in 1998. He also holds the record as youngest player ever to be sent off in a World Cup, aged 17.

Nicknamed "Big Chief" by Turkish fans, he is the uncle of fellow Cameroon defensive midfielder Alex Song and of rugby league player Junior Nsemba.

== Early life ==
Rigobert Song Bahanag was born on 1 July 1976 in Nkenglikok, Nyong-et-Kéllé.

== Club career ==
=== Early years (1993–1998) ===
Song started his professional career at Metz. He made several strong appearances that earned him a selection to The Indomitable Lions for the World Cup in 1994.

=== Liverpool (1999–2000) ===
Following his Italian experience with Serie A side Salernitana, Song moved to Liverpool in January 1999 for £2.7 million. Having been frozen out by the Italians, he made a good impression during a trial spell at Anfield. Before he arrived, Song already had the distinction of playing in two World Cups for his country.

The first Cameroonian player to play for the Reds, Song made his League debut against Coventry City at Highfield Road. Early on he earned the support of Liverpool fans, who appreciated his strength, all-action style and effort. His natural position was centre-back, but during his time at Anfield, Song operated at right-back and became a popular figure with Liverpool fans, who used to affectionately sing "We've only got one Song!" He had a mixed 1999–2000 campaign, missing three months of the season, due to international matches with the Indomitable Lions, captaining them to victory in the 2000 African Nations Cup, and scoring the decisive penalty in the final game against Nigeria.

Song was not able to find a spot in the starting eleven during the 2000–01 season, and played just four games. One of the games was a 2000–01 UEFA Cup first round away game against Rapid București. Liverpool eventually won the tournament, making Song a UEFA Cup winner. His last appearance for Liverpool was a 1–1 draw with Sunderland at Anfield on 23 September 2000. He made a total of 38 appearances for the Reds. He left Anfield to sign for West Ham United on 28 November 2000, in a deal that also saw Liverpool capture young Finnish striker Daniel Sjölund.

=== West Ham, 1. FC Köln and Lens (2000–2004) ===
Song signed for West Ham for £2.5 million. The club identified the 24-year-old defender as a possible replacement for Rio Ferdinand, who had signed for Leeds United. He made his West Ham debut on 29 November 2000 in the League Cup. In a fourth-round game at The Boleyn Ground, West Ham lost 1–2 to Sheffield Wednesday. Song's debut was described by the BBC as "unhappy". In his early days, Song insisted that he did not want to be compared to Ferdinand, as he believed it was derogatory to his own talent. Over two seasons, he made 27 appearances for West Ham in all competitions without scoring, his final game coming on 29 September 2001; a 5–0 away defeat to Everton in the Premier League. In November 2001, he joined 1. FC Köln on loan, for the remainder of the 2001–02 season. He left West Ham on 26 June 2002, joining Lens.

=== Galatasaray (2004–2008) ===
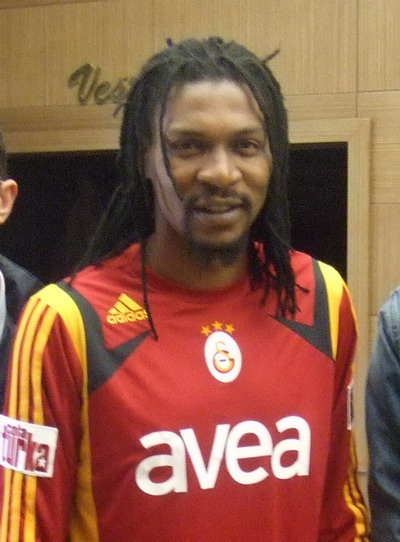
Song with Galatasaray in 2008

Song then signed for Galatasaray in 2004. He became an instant fan favourite, and formed a strong defensive partnership with Stjepan Tomas at the heart of defence.

During the 2006–07 season, he struggled to find a place in the team, after an argument with then-Galatasaray manager Eric Gerets during a league game. Although Song apologized for the incident both publicly and privately, Gerets had no interest in letting bygones be bygones, and the player remained out of favour. With the arrival of new coach Karl-Heinz Feldkamp in the 2007–08 season, Song once again become a vital member of the squad, and the club's new captain. Upon his return from the African Cup of Nations with Cameroon, however, he found himself on the bench due to injury, with the emergence of Emre Güngör who partnered Servet Çetin at the heart of the defence in Galatasaray's run for their 16th league title. With a better offer to play elsewhere, Song decided to leave at the end of the 2007–08 season to sign for fellow Süper Lig club Trabzonspor.

=== Trabzonspor (2008–2010) ===
Song joined the club on a free transfer. After a successful start to 2008–09 season, he became a fan-favorite in Trabzon, playing 28 games in the league without accumulating any yellow or red cards, nor scoring any goals. After Ersun Yanal resigned as manager, however, Song lost his place in the starting lineup. Nonetheless, during the next season, he became Trabzonspor's new captain on 1 December 2009, after Şenol Güneş took over as the club's new manager. Trabzonspor would end up becoming the last club of his professional career.

== International career ==
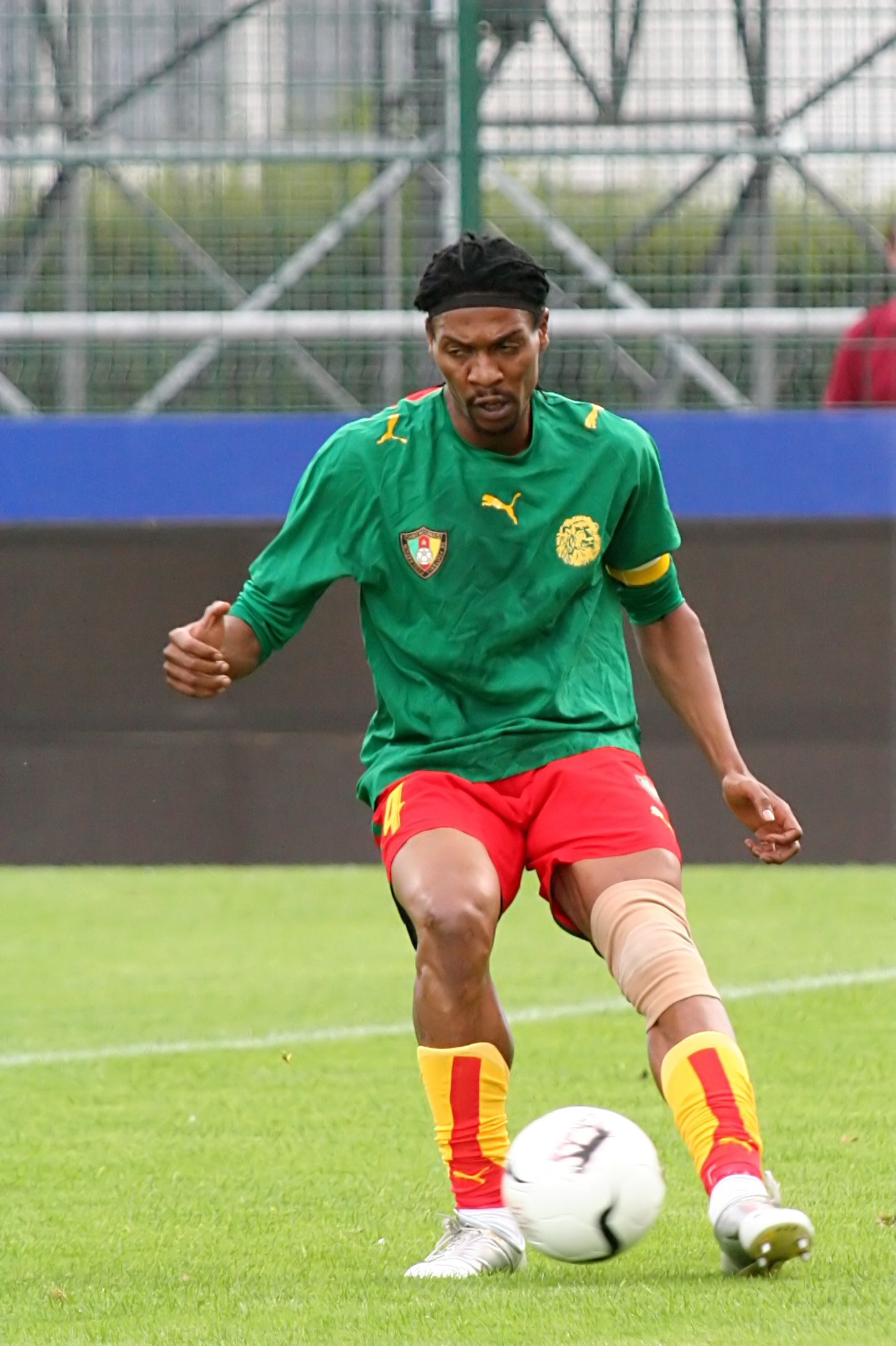
Song playing for Cameroon in 2006

Considered a key player for Cameroon for over a decade, Song played in the 1994, 1998, 2002 and 2010 World Cups. He made his international debut on 22 September 1993, in a game against Mexico.

At only 17 years old, Song was given a surprise call-up to Henri Michel's Cameroon squad for the 1994 World Cup, playing two group matches in the finals against Sweden and Brazil. He received a red card in the match against Brazil, becoming the youngest player ever to be sent off in a World Cup. Led by veteran striker Roger Milla, the Indomitable Lions were knocked out in the group stage. The 24 years and 42 days age gap between Milla (42 years and 35 days) and future captain Song (17 years and 358 days) became (and remains) the largest between two teammates in World Cup history.

Song then participated at the 1998 World Cup. Led by Song, Patrick Mboma and 17-year old striker Samuel Eto'o, Cameroon were eliminated in the group stage following a draw with Austria (1–1), a loss to Italy (3–0) and another draw with Chile. After receiving a red card in the last game against La Roja, Song broke another record: he became the first player ever to be sent off at two different World Cups. Zinedine Zidane, who was also sent off at this World Cup, has since achieved this feat as well, receiving his second red card in the final of the 2006 tournament.

Song was a part of the Cameroon squads that won the 2000 and 2002 Africa Cup of Nations. After winning the 23rd edition of the football championship of Africa, the Indomitable Lions featured in the 2002 World Cup, but were again eliminated in the group stage following a 1–1 draw with the Republic of Ireland, a 1–0 win over Saudi Arabia and a 2–0 defeat to Germany.

Song's next tournament was the 2003 Confederations Cup. The Indomitable Lions qualified for the semi-finals after wins against Brazil (0–1) and Turkey (1–0) and a draw with the United States. The defender then led his team against Colombia in the knockout stage. In the 72nd minute of the game, Song's long-time friend Marc-Vivien Foé collapsed in the centre circle, with no other players near him. Foé died the same day due to hypertrophic cardiomyopathy, a hereditary condition known to increase the risk of sudden death during physical exercise. Cameroon eventually won the game 1–0, but lost to France in the finals after extra time.

Although Cameroon did not manage to qualify for the 2006 World Cup finals, the team participated in the 2006 Africa Cup of Nations. In the tournament, Song became the most capped player in Cameroon history. After three wins over Angola (3–1), Togo (2–0) and Congo DR (2–0) in the group stage, the Indomitable Lions were eliminated in the quarter-finals by Ivory Coast, following a 24-penalty shoot-out, in which Cameroon was defeated 12–11.

Song was also part of the Cameroon squad for the 2008 Africa Cup of Nations. After a 4–2 loss to Egypt in the Group C opening match, the veteran defender led his team to wins against Zambia (5–1) and Sudan (3–0). In the first game against The Pharaohs, Song's nephew Alex made his international debut for Cameroon, joining Rigobert on the pitch at half-time. The captain then carried the Indomitable Lions to the knockout stage, in which they defeated Tunisia (2–3) and Ghana (0–1) before losing the final to Egypt 1–0. The only goal, made by Mohamed Aboutrika, came after a mistake by Song, who covered his face with his shirt during the opponent's celebration.

On 31 May 2008, Song scored the first goal for Cameroon after nine minutes, in a 2–0 home win against Cape Verde. With the win, the Indomitable Lions took an early lead in Group 1 of the 2010 World Cup and Africa Cup of Nations qualifiers.

In 2009, Song was dropped as captain of the Cameroonian national team, from the World Cup/African Nations Cup qualifiers by new coach Paul Le Guen, but still remained the player that defined the image of the national team. Le Guen eventually appointed Samuel Eto'o as his new captain. On 12 August 2009, Cameroon's most-capped player was left out of the starting eleven for the first time in ten years in a friendly game against Austria. In 16 years with the national team, he has been to the African Nations Cup a record eight times, serving as captain in five competitions - except in South Africa in 1996, Burkina Faso in 1998 and Angola in 2010. Song holds the record of most consecutive games played in the African Nations Cup, with 35 first-team games. He won the Nations Cup twice in Nigeria 2000 and Mali 2002, losing to Egypt in the finals in Ghana 2008.

In 2010, Cameroon was featured in the 2010 Africa Cup of Nations, but failed to win the tournament. On 13 January 2010, the Lions lost in a 1–0 group-stage upset against Gabon, but won a match against Zambia four days later, 3–2. Despite being considered an experienced player, some of Song's mistakes in the tournament were called "self-destructive": in the first game against Gabon, a defensive error allowed Daniel Cousin's goal, and against Zambia in the second, he headed a cross towards his own goal. The team still qualified for the quarter-finals with four points, after a draw with Tunisia on 21 January, in which Song came in as a substitute. Two days later, Cameroon was eliminated from the Africa Cup of Nations, following a 3–1 loss after extra time to Egypt. In the match, Aurélien Chedjou was preferred to Song, ending the former captain's run of 36 successive Africa Cup of Nations matches, a total of 3,201 minutes. After such events, Song was relegated to a role as backup for a string of games, as Le Guen often preferred to field younger players such as Sébastien Bassong and Benoît Assou-Ekotto.

Although he had handed the captain's armband over to Eto'o, Song was still selected for the 2010 World Cup squad in South Africa, making him the only player to play in the 1994 and 2010 World Cup finals. He was also the most experienced player to be featured in South Africa 2010, with 136 caps for his nation.

Song did not play in Cameroon's opening game of the World Cup against Japan. The Samurai Blue won the game 1–0, with a goal from Keisuke Honda. After the match, Song and some senior players claimed that Cameroon's youngsters were not up to required standard, and asked Le Guen to reconsider his lineup for the next group match against Denmark. Song, however, was again omitted in the game with Denmark, which Cameroon lost 2–1. With the loss, they became the first team to be mathematically eliminated in the 2010 World Cup. The former captain eventually featured in the last game against the Netherlands, his fourth World Cup participation; he entered the match as a substitute for Nicolas N'Koulou in the 73rd minute of the second-half. The Indomitable Lions went out of the tournament with a 1–2 loss and shortly after, on 1 August, Song retired from international duty after 137 total appearances.

== Managerial career ==
In late 2015, Song was reportedly close to becoming the manager of the Chad national team, but an agreement was never finalised. In February 2016, Song was appointed as manager of the Cameroon A' team, which is composed of players based in Cameroon. Following his hospitalisation for a brain aneurysm and subsequent recovery, Song resumed coaching duties in 2017, ahead of the qualification stage of the 2018 African Nations Championship. He led the team into the tournament, which saw Cameroon finish bottom of their group after two losses and a draw.

In April 2018, Song was one of 77 applicants for the vacant Cameroon national team job. He assumed the role on a caretaker basis later in the year.

On 17 October 2018, FECAFOOT announced that Song would take control of the Cameroon under-23 team for the 2019 Africa U-23 Cup of Nations campaign.

On 28 February 2022, it was announced that Song had replaced Toni Conceição as the manager of the Cameroon national team. He guided Cameroon to the 2022 FIFA World Cup, after beating Algeria in the final hurdle. At the 2022 FIFA World Cup, his Cameroon team failed to progress from the group stage, despite guiding Cameroon to their first World Cup victory since 2002 against the mighty Brazil, with a shock 1–0 win.

On 29 February 2024, he was dismissed from the job, following Cameroon's poor performance in the 2023 Africa Cup of Nations.

He became the Central African Republic national football team manager on 14 January 2025 ahead of the 2024 African Nations Championship in August 2025. His role as manager was not announced by the Central African Football Federation until 3 March 2025, and after claims the Federation was not consulted in the process, he was dismissed from his role on 10 March 2025.

== Outside football ==
=== Personal life ===
Song's father, Paul Song, died when he was young. Song is married to Esther Song, and has four children (two sons and two daughters): Ronny Paul, Bryan, Yohanna Bernadette and Hillary Veronique Liliane. They currently live in Liverpool. Rigobert is also a national ambassador for Cameroon.

He acquired French nationality by naturalization on 21 January 1999.

His nephew Alex Song played as a defensive midfielder for clubs in France, England, Spain, Russia, and Djibouti. About the relationship with Rigobert, Alex said: "I speak to him all the time and always call on him for advice. He's a good person to talk to because of his experience in England and I can ask him anything, depending on situations."

=== Illness ===
On 3 October 2016, it was reported that Song had suffered a "cerebral attack", and was hospitalised in Cameroon. He was in a coma for two days, after having had a stroke, with doctors planning to transfer him to a French hospital for further treatment. He returned to Cameroon in April 2017, and resumed coaching duties later that year.

== Career statistics ==
=== Club ===
Appearances and goals by club, season and competition
Club	Season	League			National cup		League cup		Europe		Total	
Club	Season	Division	Apps	Goals	Apps	Goals	Apps	Goals	Apps	Goals	Apps	Goals
Metz	1994–95	French Division 1	24	2	2	0	1	0	–		27	2
Metz	1995–96	French Division 1	37	0	0	0	4	0	–		41	0
Metz	1996–97	French Division 1	34	0	0	0	1	0	6 (Note: Appearance(s) in UEFA Cup)	1	41	1
Metz	1997–98	French Division 1	28	1	1	0	0	0	4	0	33	1
Metz	Total		123	3	3	0	6	0	10	1	142	4
Salernitana	1998–99	Serie A	4	1	2	0	–		–		6	1
Liverpool	1998–99	Premier League	13	0	0	0	0	0	–		13	0
Liverpool	1999–2000	Premier League	18	0	1	0	2	0	–		21	0
Liverpool	2000–01	Premier League	3	0	0	0	0	0	1	0	4	0
Liverpool	Total		34	0	1	0	2	0	1	0	38	0
West Ham United	2000–01	Premier League	19	0	1	0	2	0	–		22	0
West Ham United	2001–02	Premier League	5	0	0	0	1	0	–		6	0
West Ham United	Total		24	0	1	0	3	0	–		28	0
1. FC Köln	2001–02	Bundesliga	16	0	3	1	–		–		19	1
Lens	2002–03	Ligue 1	35	3	1	0	1	0	8 (Note: Six appearances in UEFA Champions League, two appearances and one goal in UEFA Cup)	1	45	4
Lens	2003–04	Ligue 1	28	0	0	0	3	0	4	0	35	0
Lens	Total		63	3	1	0	4	0	12	1	78	4
Galatasaray	2004–05	Süper Lig	28	2	4	0	–		–		36	2
Galatasaray	2005–06	Süper Lig	29	1	2	0	–		2	0	33	1
Galatasaray	2006–07	Süper Lig	25	1	2	0	1 (Note: Appearance in Turkish Super Cup)	0	7 (Note: Appearances in UEFA Champions League)	0	35	1
Galatasaray	2007–08	Süper Lig	22	0	2	1	–		8	1	32	2
Galatasaray	Total		104	4	10	1	1	0	17	1	132	6
Trabzonspor	2008–09	Süper Lig	28	0	3	0	–		–		31	0
Trabzonspor	2009–10	Süper Lig	18	0	5	1	–		2 (Note: Appearances in UEFA Europa League)	1	23	2
Trabzonspor	Total		46	0	8	1	–		2	1	56	2
Career total			414	11	29	3	16	0	42	4	501	18

=== International ===
Appearances and goals by national team and year
National team	Year	Apps	Goals
Cameroon	1993	1	0
Cameroon	1994	4	1
Cameroon	1995	2	0
Cameroon	1996	5	0
Cameroon	1997	7	0
Cameroon	1998	12	1
Cameroon	1999	3	1
Cameroon	2000	11	0
Cameroon	2001	10	0
Cameroon	2002	15	0
Cameroon	2003	7	0
Cameroon	2004	11	1
Cameroon	2005	6	1
Cameroon	2006	7	0
Cameroon	2007	6	0
Cameroon	2008	12	0
Cameroon	2009	6	0
Cameroon	2010	4	0
Total		129	5

List of international goals scored by Rigobert Song

#	Date	Venue	Opponent	Score	Result	Competition
1	28 January 1998	Roumdé Adjia Stadium, Garoua, Cameroon	Angola	1–0	Win	Friendly match
2	6 June 1999	Stade Ahmadou Ahidjo, Yaoundé, Cameroon	Eritrea	1–0	Win	2000 African Cup qualifying
3	6 June 2004	Stade Ahmadou Ahidjo, Yaoundé, Cameroon	Benin	2–1	Win	2006 World Cup qualifying
4	4 June 2005	Stade de l'Amitié, Cotonou, Benin	Benin	1–4	Win	2006 World Cup qualifying
5	31 May 2008	Stade Ahmadou Ahidjo, Yaoundé, Cameroon	Cape Verde	2–0	Win	2010 World Cup qualifying

=== Managerial ===
As of matches played 27 January 2024

Managerial record by team and tenure
Team	From	To	Record				
Team	From	To	P	W	D	L	Win %
Cameroon U23	23 October 2018	17 July 2022	3	1	1	1	33.33
Cameroon	1 March 2022	28 February 2024	23	6	8	9	26.09
Central African Republic	14 January 2025	10 March 2025	0	0	0	0	—
Total			31	9	11	11	29.03

== Honours ==
=== Player ===
Metz

- Coupe de la Ligue: 1995–96

Liverpool

- UEFA Cup: 2000–01

Galatasaray

- Süper Lig: 2005–06, 2007–08
- Turkish Cup: 2004–05

Trabzonspor

- Turkish Cup: 2009–10

Cameroon

- African Cup of Nations: 2000, 2002; runner-up, 2008
- FIFA Confederations Cup: runner up, 2003

=== Individual ===
- Africa Cup of Nations Player of the Tournament: 2002
- Africa Cup of Nations Team of the Tournament: 2000, 2002, 2006
- UNFP Ligue 1 Team of the Year: 1997–98
- IFFHS All-time Africa Men's Dream Team: 2021
- CAF Legends Award: 2012

Orders

- Knight of the Order of Valour

== See also ==
- List of men's footballers with 100 or more international caps
