= Ahmet Görkem Görk =

Turkish footballer

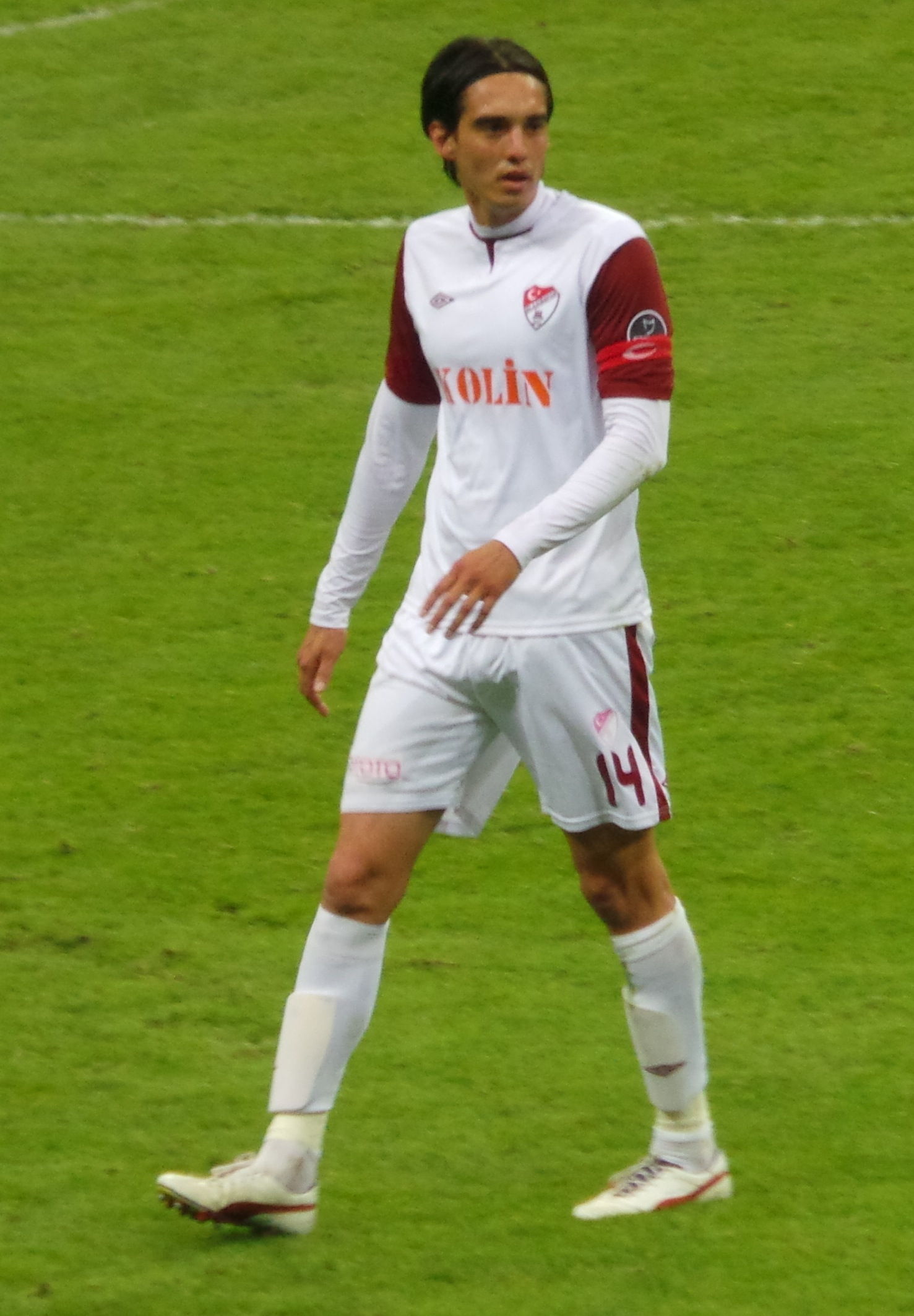

Personal information
- Full name: Ahmet Görkem Görk
- Date of birth: 30 June 1983 (age 43)
- Place of birth: Kadıköy, Istanbul, Turkey
- Height: 1.93 m (6 ft 4 in)
- Position: Centre back

Team information
- Current team: Boluspor (assistant manager)

Youth career
- 1999–2002: Galatasaray

Senior career*
Years	Team	Apps	(Gls)
2002–2004	Galatasaray	1	(0)
2004–2005	Beylerbeyi	30	(1)
2005–2006	Sivasspor	0	(0)
2006–2007	Eyüpspor	17	(3)
2007–2009	Çaykur Rizespor	27	(1)
2008	→ Boluspor (loan)	17	(6)
2009–2010	Konyaspor	28	(2)
2010–2011	Adanaspor	18	(1)
2011–2014	Elazığspor	51	(4)
2014	Çaykur Rizespor	7	(0)
2014–2016	Osmanlıspor	8	(0)
2016–2017	Eyüpspor	5	(0)

International career
2002	Turkey U20	1	(0)

Managerial career
- 2018–2019: İstanbul Başakşehir (youth)
- 2019–2020: Galatasaray (youth)
- 2021–2022: Niğde Anadolu (assistant)
- 2022–2023: Boluspor (academy)
- 2023: Boluspor (caretaker)
- 2023–: Boluspor
- * Club domestic league appearances and goals

Ahmet Görkem Görk (born 30 June 1983) is a Turkish professional football coach and a former centre back. He is an assistant coach with Boluspor.
