= Abdullah Ercan =

Turkish footballer and manager

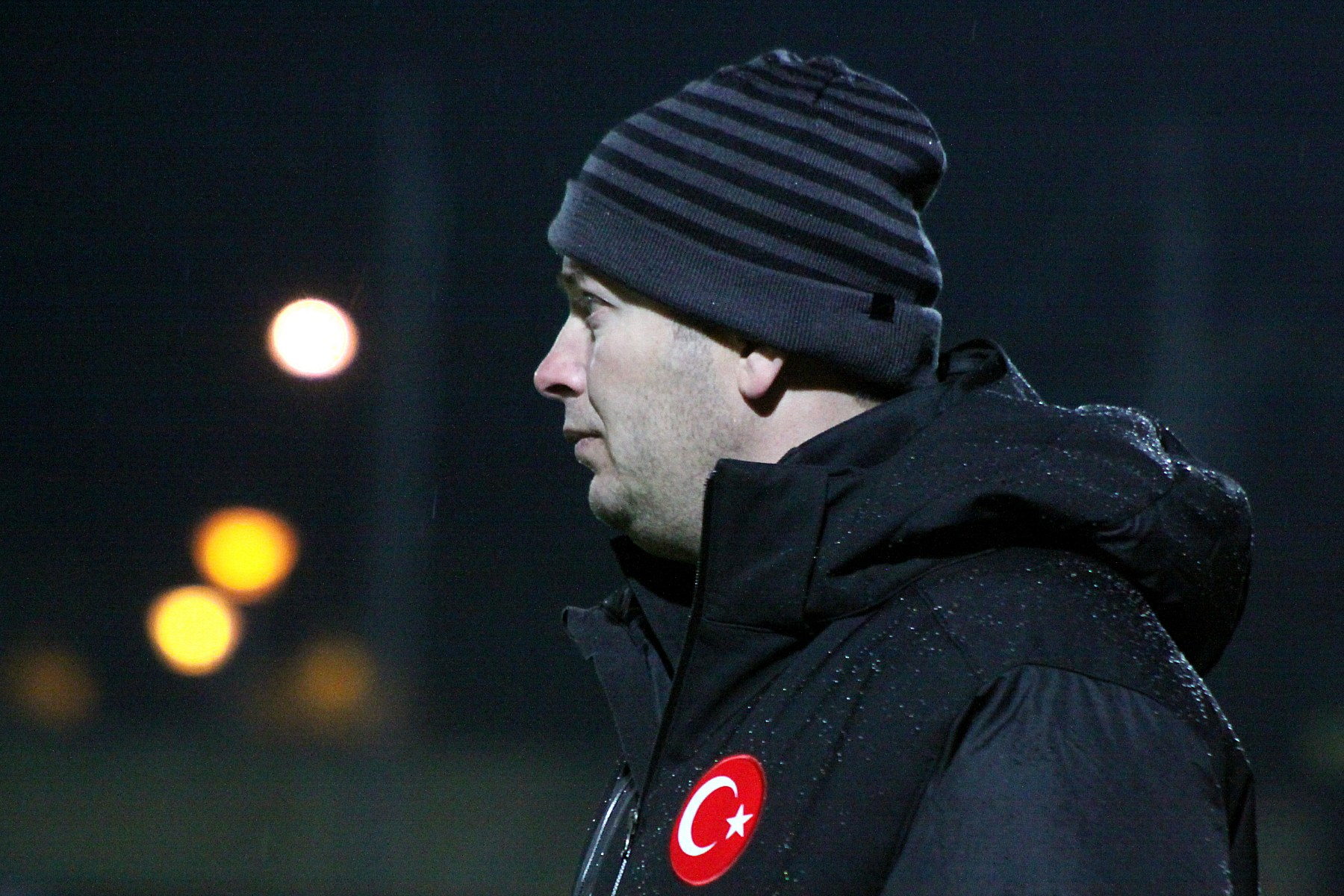
- Ercan in 2013

Personal information
- Full name: Abdullah Ercan
- Date of birth: 8 December 1971 (age 54)
- Place of birth: Istanbul, Turkey
- Height: 1.82 m (6 ft 0 in)
- Position: Left wing back

Youth career
- 1984–1990: Beyoğlu Kapalıçarşıspor

Senior career*
Years	Team	Apps	(Gls)
1990–1999	Trabzonspor	249	(11)
1999–2003	Fenerbahçe	101	(5)
2003–2004	Galatasaray	7	(0)
2004–2006	İstanbulspor	29	(0)
Total		386	(16)

International career
1989–1990	Turkey U18	10	(1)
1990–1993	Turkey U21	19	(1)
1993	Turkey Olympic	4	(0)
1993–2003	Turkey	68	(0)

Managerial career
- 2007–2011: Turkey U17
- 2008–2011: Turkey U21 (assistant)
- 2011–2012: Gaziantepspor
- 2012–2018: Turkey U21
- 2015–2018: Turkey (assistant)
- 2019: Menemen Belediyespor
- 2019: Sakaryaspor
Medal record
Third place	FIFA World Cup	2002
- * Club domestic league appearances and goals

Abdullah Ercan (born 8 December 1971) is a Turkish former professional footballer and manager. Born in Istanbul, Turkey, he primarily played as a defender during his playing career and represented several Turkish clubs, including Trabzonspor, Fenerbahçe and Galatasaray.

He made his debut for the Turkey national team in 1993, earning 68 international caps, and contributed to Turkey's third-place finish at the 2002 FIFA World Cup. After retiring as a player, he pursued a career in management, coaching Turkey's youth national teams and managing several clubs.

== Club career ==
Ercan began playing football at the amateur club Beyoğlu Kapalıçarşıspor and started his professional career after joining Trabzonspor in 1990. He played for Trabzonspor for approximately nine years, until 1999, establishing himself as a regular starting defender. During this period, he played a key role in the team, winning the Turkish Cup twice, and was regarded as one of the notable left-backs in Turkish football at the time.

After transferring to Fenerbahçe in 1999, Ercan played for the club until 2003. He helped Fenerbahçe win the Turkish top-flight league title in the 2000–01 season. However, his playing opportunities were limited during the 2002–03 season due to internal circumstances at the club. In 2003, he moved to Galatasaray, but made relatively few appearances for the team and left the club in December of the same year.

Ercan joined İstanbulspor in 2004 and played for the club for two seasons. He retired from professional football in 2006 while playing for İstanbulspor.

== International career ==
Ercan made his debut for the Turkey national team on 27 October 1993 in a 1994 FIFA World Cup qualifying match against Poland. He subsequently became a regular member of the national team and participated in UEFA Euro 1996, appearing in Turkey's group-stage matches.

Ercan also participated in UEFA Euro 2000, helping Turkey reach the quarter-finals. He subsequently represented Turkey at the 2002 FIFA World Cup, where the national team finished third.

He represented Turkey from 1993 to 2003, making 71 appearances for the national team without scoring a goal.

== Managerial career ==
Ercan was appointed as a coach of Turkey's youth national teams in 2007. From 2008 to 2011, he served as manager of the Turkey under-17 national team and assistant coach of the under-21 national team. During his tenure with the under-17 team, he led them to the quarter-finals of the 2009 FIFA U-17 World Cup and the semi-finals of the 2010 UEFA European Under-17 Championship.

In 2011, Ercan was appointed manager of Gaziantepspor, a position he held until January 2012. He subsequently managed Turkey's under-20 and under-21 national teams before serving as an assistant coach of the senior national team from 2015 to 2018.

== Honours ==
Trabzonspor

- Turkish Cup: 1992, 1995
- Turkish Super Cup: 1995
- Chancellor Cup: 1994, 1996

Fenerbahçe

- Süper Lig: 2000–01

Turkey

- FIFA World Cup third place: 2002

Order

- Turkish State Medal of Distinguished Service
