= Mehmet Çoğum =

Turkish footballer (born 1983)

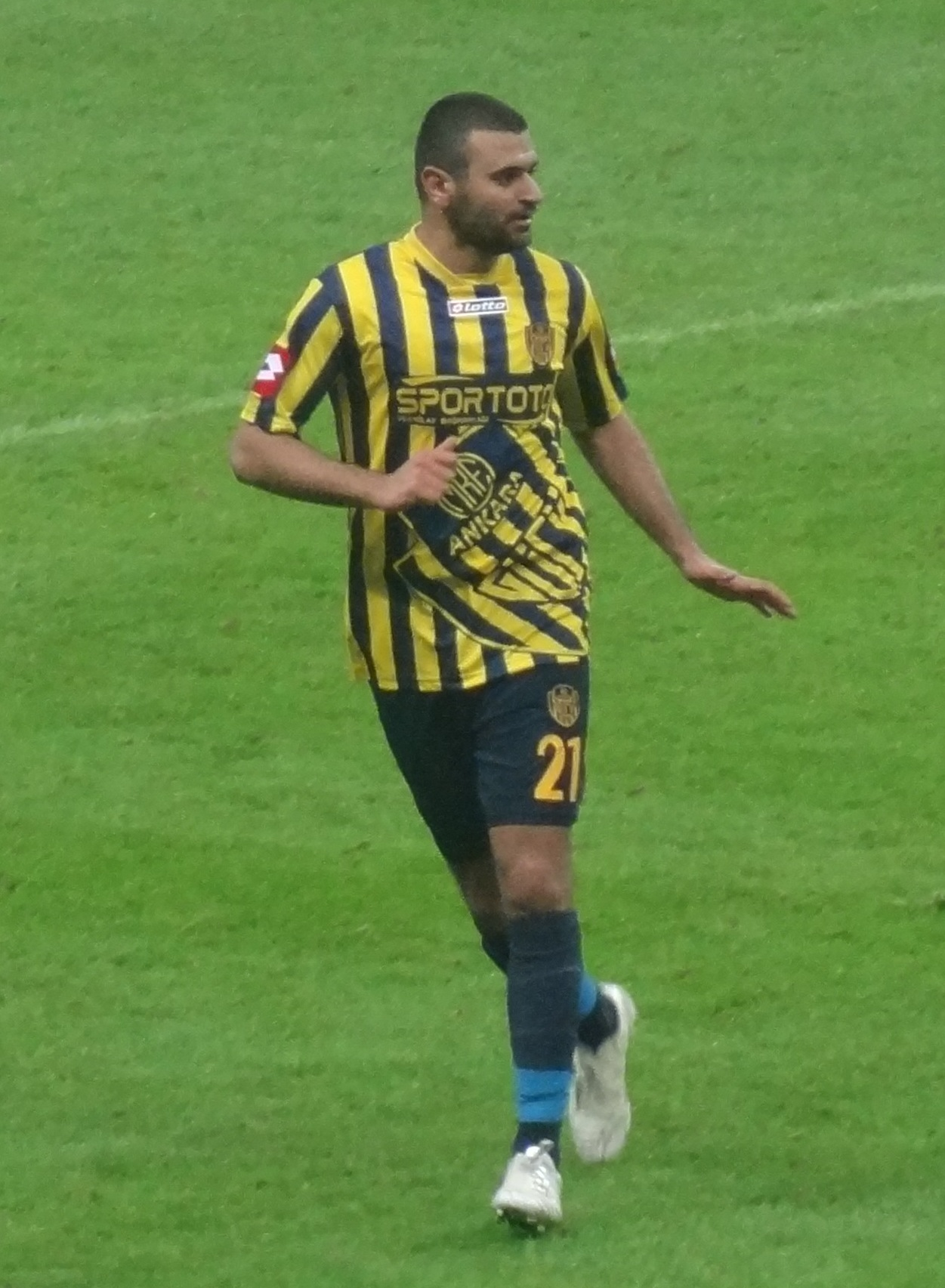

Personal information
- Full name: Mehmet Çoğum
- Date of birth: 5 February 1983 (age 43)
- Place of birth: İskenderun, Turkey
- Height: 1.81 m (5 ft 11 1/2 in)
- Positions: Right back; centre back

Youth career
- Dardanelspor

Senior career*
Years	Team	Apps	(Gls)
1999–2005	Dardanelspor	106	(1)
2005–2008	Gaziantepspor	77	(2)
2008–2009	Konyaspor	25	(0)
2009–2010	Denizlispor	11	(0)
2010–2011	Karabükspor	7	(0)
2011–2013	Ankaragücü	16	(0)
2013	Tavşanlı Linyitspor	2	(0)
2014	Karşıyaka	0	(0)

Managerial career
- 2017: Dardanelspor (assistant)
- 2018: Dardanelspor
- * Club domestic league appearances and goals

Mehmet Çoğum (born 5 February 1983) is a Turkish footballer who played as a right back and current football coach. He was most recently the head coach of Dardanelspor.

Çoğum began his professional career with Dardanel Spor A.Ş. Prior to joining MKE Ankaragücü, Çoğum played for Gaziantepspor, Konyaspor, Denizlispor, and Karabükspor.
