= Tolga Seyhan =

Turkish former footballer (born 1977)

Personal information
- Full name: Tolga Seyhan
- Date of birth: 17 January 1977 (age 49)
- Place of birth: Giresun, Turkey
- Height: 1.87 m (6 ft 1 1/2 in)
- Positions: Central defender; right back

Senior career*
Years	Team	Apps	(Gls)
1995–1996	Düzcespor	36	(5)
1996–2002	Çanakkale Dardanelspor	116	(4)
2002–2004	Malatyaspor	67	(11)
2004–2005	Trabzonspor	41	(1)
2005–2008	Shakhtar Donetsk	15	(0)
2006–2007	→ Galatasaray (loan)	4	(0)
2007–2008	→ Trabzonspor (loan)	12	(0)
2008–2009	Kocaelispor	10	(1)
2009	Hacettepespor	9	(1)
2009–2010	Gaziantepspor	17	(0)
2010–2011	Giresunspor	7	(0)

International career^{‡}
2004–2006	Turkey	18	(2)
- * Club domestic league appearances and goals as of 20 July 2011 ‡ National team caps and goals as of 15:09, 7 April 2009 (UTC)

Tolga Seyhan (born January 17, 1977) is a Turkish former footballer. He was born in Giresun, a city on the Black Sea.

== Club career ==
Tolga started out his career as a striker at Giresun Şafakspor. He continued at this position for a number of years and at several clubs including Sivasspor, Düzcespor and Çanakkale Dardanelspor. It was here that he was originally moved to defence, and he took it in his stride as he made the position of central defence his own.

He soon joined Malatyaspor and was extremely impressive as Malatyaspor defied expectations to remain in the Turkish Süper Lig in their first season in the top flight, in the 2001/2002 season. The next season was even more impressive as a late season run enabled Malatyaspor to claim a UEFA Cup place for the next season. By this point, Tolga had made his first appearances for the Turkey national team and was being courted by many clubs, but remained with Malatyaspor for the beginning of the next season.

When the Malatyaspor manager Ziya Doğan left to join Trabzonspor in January 2004 he took Tolga with him. Tolga has since developed into one of the best defenders in Turkish football.

Eighteen months later, Tolga was bought by the Ukrainian team Shakhtar Donetsk.

In July 2006, Galatasaray had made an agreement with Tolga to play for them, on loan for one season.

In July 2010, he returned to where he was born, Giresun, for a one-year contract with Giresunspor, playing in Turkish 1st division "Bank Asya League". Giresunspor's board decided to give him the captain armband.

== Honours ==
=== Club ===
Trabzonspor

- Turkish Cup: 2003–04
