= Okan Koç =

Turkish footballer

Personal information
- Date of birth: 22 January 1982 (age 44)
- Place of birth: Sakarya, Turkey
- Position: Right winger

Senior career*
Years	Team	Apps	(Gls)
2002–2003	Gençlerbirliği	30	(5)
2003–2004	Beşiktaş	17	(1)
2004	Konyaspor	12	(3)
2005–2006	Ankaragücü	11	(1)
2006	Konyaspor	10	(0)
2007–2008	Manisaspor	26	(0)
2009–2011	Denizlispor	17	(0)
2011–2012	Dardanelspor	10	(0)
2012	Anadolu Selçukspor	8	(1)
- * Club domestic league appearances and goals

Okan Koç (born 22 January 1982) is a Turkish former professional footballer who played as a right winger.

== Club career ==
Koç began his career with lower division club Çanakkale Dardanelspor, before being transferred to Gençlerbirliği in 2002, where he made his Super Lig debut. He transferred to Beşiktaş J.K. in 2003. He was loaned to Konyaspor in 2003–2004 season. He spent two seasons there until being transferred to Ankaragücü in 2005. He returned to Beşiktaş for the 2005–2006 season.

In September 2006, Koç was transferred to Konyaspor in a part-exchange deal including Kais. However, he was transferred to Vestel Manisaspor in January 2007. He was then transferred to Sakaryaspor in the 2008–2009 season. He was subsequently transferred to Altay in 2009.

== Style of play ==
During his professional career, Koç possessed an "excellent technical ability" and "pace".
