= Ali Lukunku =

Congolese former professional footballer (born 1976)

Personal information
- Full name: Maboula Ali Lukunku
- Date of birth: 14 April 1976 (age 50)
- Place of birth: Kinshasa, Zaire
- Height: 1.90 m (6 ft 3 in)
- Position: Striker

Senior career*
Years	Team	Apps	(Gls)
1995–1997	ASOA Valence	52	(26)
1997–1998	Monaco	0	(0)
1998–2003	Standard Liège	25	(16)
2002–2004	Galatasaray	14	(6)
2004	Lille	1	(0)
2004–2006	Gent	4	(0)
2006–2008	Standard Liège	23	(6)
2008	R.A.E.C. Mons	7	(0)
2008–2009	Erzgebirge Aue	12	(6)
2009–2010	RFC Liège	9	(0)
Total		147	(60)
- * Club domestic league appearances and goals

Maboula "Ali" Lukunku (born 14 April 1976) is a Congolese former professional footballer who played as a striker.

== Career ==
Born in Kinshasa, Lukunku moved with his family to Italy at an early age before they settled in Grenoble, France. He had success playing in the Belgian Pro League with Standard de Liège.
