= Mülayim Erdem =

Turkish footballer

Personal information
- Full name: Mülayim Erdem
- Date of birth: January 10, 1987 (age 39)
- Place of birth: Istanbul, Turkey
- Height: 1.82 m (6 ft 0 in)
- Position: Midfielder

Team information
- Current team: Vefa SK

Youth career
- 2000–2005: Galatasaray A2

Senior career*
Years	Team	Apps	(Gls)
2005–2009	Galatasaray	7	(0)
2006–2007	→ İstanbul BŞB (loan)	6	(0)
2007–2008	→ Orduspor (loan)	18	(0)
2008–2009	→ Gaziantep BŞB (loan)	2	(0)
2009–2011	Yalovaspor	48	(9)
2011–2013	Gölbaşıspor	48	(7)
2013–2014	Kocaeli Birlik Spor	30	(7)
2014–2015	Pazarspor	27	(3)
2015–2016	Manisa B.B.	10	(0)
2016–	Vefa SK		
- * Club domestic league appearances and goals

Mülayim Erdem (born January 10, 1987) is a Turkish footballer who currently plays for Vefa SK.

== Career ==
A midfielder, Erdem currently plays on loan for Gaziantep Büyükşehir Belediyespor. He is a product of the Galatasaray Youth Team.

Mülayim is also the nephew of the former Galatasaray player, Arif Erdem.
