= Zafer Şakar =

Turkish footballer

Personal information
- Date of birth: 25 September 1985 (age 41)
- Place of birth: Malatya, Turkey
- Height: 1.70 m (5 ft 7 in)
- Position: Midfielder

Youth career
- –2005: Galatasaray

Senior career*
Years	Team	Apps	(Gls)
2005–2009	Galatasaray	4	(0)
2006	→ Manisaspor (loan)	10	(0)
2006–2007	→ Denizlispor (loan)	0	(0)
2007–2009	→ Samsunspor (loan)	20	(1)
2009	→ Beylerbeyi (loan)		
2009–2010	Boluspor	12	(0)
2010–2011	Diyarbakırspor	8	(0)
2011	Gaziantep BB	13	(0)
2011–2012	İstanbul Güngörenspor	8	(1)
2012	Körfez	3	(0)
2012–2013	Batman Petrolspor	11	(2)

International career
2004	Turkey U19	4	(0)
2005	Turkey U20	3	(0)
- * Club domestic league appearances and goals

Zafer Şakar (born 25 September 1985) is a Turkish former football midfielder.

== Club career ==
Şakar played for Galatasaray, Denizlispor, Samsunspor, Beylerbeyi S.K., Boluspor, Diyarbakırspor, Güngörenspor and Gaziantep Büyükşehir Belediyespor. Şakar is a product of the Galatasaray youth team.

== International career ==
Şakar played for Turkey at the 2005 FIFA World Youth Championship in the Netherlands.
