= Cafercan Aksu =

Turkish footballer (born 1987)

Personal information
- Date of birth: 15 January 1987 (age 39)
- Place of birth: Antalya, Turkey
- Height: 1.83 m (6 ft 0 in)
- Position: Striker

Team information
- Current team: Siirt İl Özel İdaresi SK
- Number: 10

Youth career
- Galatasaray

Senior career*
Years	Team	Apps	(Gls)
2004–2009	Galatasaray	3	(1)
2005–2006	→ Çaykur Rizespor (loan)	2	(0)
2006–2007	→ İstanbul BB (loan)	28	(2)
2007–2008	→ Orduspor (loan)	29	(6)
2008–2009	→ Gaziantep BB (loan)	25	(5)
2009–2011	Selçukspor	64	(20)
2011–2013	Boluspor	30	(6)
2012	→ Giresunspor (loan)	10	(2)
2013–2014	Tavşanlı Linyitspor	19	(8)
2014	Karşıyaka SK	9	(1)
2014–2015	Kocaeli Birlik Spor	29	(6)
2015–2016	Kırklarelispor	29	(5)
2016–2018	Darıca Gençlerbirliği	55	(22)
2018–2019	Hekimoğlu Trabzon	28	(16)
2019	Buca FK	11	(1)
2020	Somaspor	7	(0)
2020–2021	Adıyaman 1954	24	(6)
2021–2022	Korkuteli Belediyespor		
2022–	Siirt İl Özel İdaresi SK	9	(1)

International career
2001	Turkey U15	9	(2)
2001	Turkey U16	9	(10)
2002–2004	Turkey U17	41	(18)
2003	Turkey U18	4	(0)
2004–2006	Turkey U19	22	(9)
2005	Turkey U21	2	(0)
- * Club domestic league appearances and goals as of 13 November 2022

Cafercan Aksu (born 15 January 1987) is a Turkish association football player who plays as a striker for TFF Third League club Siirt İl Özel İdaresi SK.

== Career ==
Formerly he played for Galatasaray youth team. He was loaned out to Rizespor at the beginning of 2005–06 season but he returned to Galatasaray during winter transfer window. However, without playing one minute in his second spell at the club, he was sent to İstanbul Büyükşehir Belediyespor in summer 2006. In the 2007–08 season, he was loaned to Türk Telekom League A side Orduspor. For 2008–09 season he is loaned to Gaziantep Büyükşehir Belediyespor.
