= Mehmet Polat =

Turkish footballer (born 1978)

Personal information
- Date of birth: 8 June 1978 (age 48)
- Place of birth: Gaziantep, Turkey
- Height: 1.78 m (5 ft 10 in)
- Positions: Defender; defensive midfielder

Youth career
- Gaskispor

Senior career*
| Years | Team | Apps | (Gls) |
| 1995–1998 | Gaskispor | 37 | (3) |
| 1997–1998 | → Gaziantep B. Bel.spor (loan) | 27 | (1) |
| 1998–2004 | Gaziantepspor | 121 | (10) |
| 1998–99 | → Karabükspor (loan) | 19 | (0) |
| 2002–2003 | → Galatasaray (loan) | 13 | (1) |
| 2005 | Çaykur Rizespor | 16 | (0) |
| 2006 | Samsunspor | 14 | (0) |
| 2007–2009 | Gaziantepspor | 41 | (0) |
| 2009 | Gençlerbirliği | 8 | (0) |
| 2010 | Bucaspor | 6 | (0) |
| 2011 | Mersin İdmanyurdu | 20 | (2) |

International career^{‡}
| 2001–2002 | Turkey | 4 | (0) |
- * Club domestic league appearances and goals as of 7 February 2011 ‡ National team caps and goals as of 7 February 2009

Mehmet Polat (born 8 June 1978 in Gaziantep) is a Turkish footballer who last played for Mersin İdmanyurdu. He is a versatile central defender who can also play as rightback or defensive midfielder. He was capped four times for Turkey. He spent 2002-03 season on loan at Galatasaray. Once considered one of the best defenders of Turkey, he could not live up to those predictions. He stands at 1.78 m and wears the jersey number 27, which is also the license plate for Gaziantep.

Transferred to Gençlerbirliği during the January transfer window of the 2008-2009 Season.
