= Hasan Kabze =

Turkish footballer

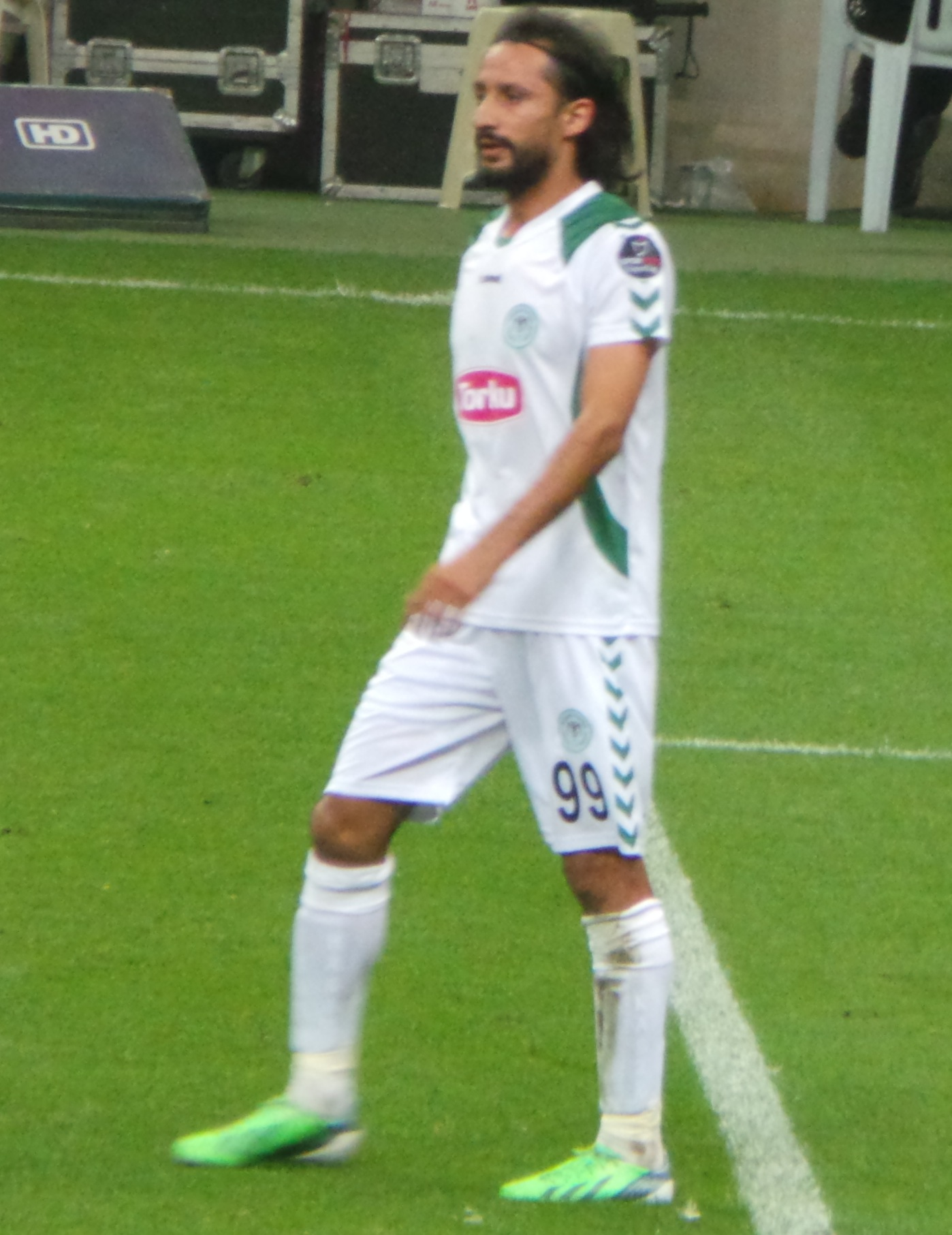
- Kabze in action for Torku Konyaspor

Personal information
- Full name: Hasan Salih Kabze
- Date of birth: 26 May 1982 (age 44)
- Place of birth: Ankara, Turkey
- Height: 1.85 m (6 ft 1 in)
- Positions: Striker; winger

Youth career
- 1999–2000: Bucaspor

Senior career*
Years	Team	Apps	(Gls)
2000–2002	Bucaspor	57	(14)
2002–2005	Dardanelspor	70	(25)
2005–2007	Galatasaray	54	(16)
2007–2010	Rubin Kazan	53	(8)
2010–2012	Montpellier	23	(3)
2012–2013	Orduspor	34	(7)
2013–2015	Konyaspor	54	(13)
2015–2016	Akhisar Belediyespor	10	(1)
2016	Sivasspor	20	(1)
2017	Altınordu	11	(3)

International career
2000	Turkey U18	4	(2)
2005–2008	Turkey A2	4	(2)
2006	Turkey	7	(2)
- * Club domestic league appearances and goals

Hasan Salih Kabze (born 26 May 1982) is a Turkish former professional footballer who played as a striker. Formerly, he played for Bucaspor, Çanakkale Dardanelspor, Galatasaray SK, Rubin Kazan, Montpellier HSC, Orduspor, Konyaspor, Akhisar Belediyespor, and Sivasspor. In 2006, he made seven appearances for the international scoring twice.

He studied at Anadolu University.

== Club career ==
=== Galatasaray ===
Kabze joined Galatasaray SK during the 2004–05 winter transfer window, and scored a goal in his debut on 4 February 2005, when the team beat Gaziantepspor 5–1 in a Süper Lig match. He scored a further two goals against Beşiktaş on the 33rd week of the Süper Lig, delivering a 2–1 win against the local rivals with the last kick of the match. After this game, Galatasaray won that year's League title.

=== Rubin Kazan ===
On 9 August 2007, Kabze joined the Russian Premier League team Rubin Kazan for a fee of €1.5 million. He scored his first goal for Rubin Kazan in a 3–1 victory against Spartak Moscow.

=== Montpellier ===
Kabze joined Ligue club Montpellier HSC in July 2010.

=== Orduspor ===
Kabze joined Orduspor on 17 January 2012. He was named as the team captain for the 2012–13 season.

=== Konyaspor ===
Kabze joined Konyaspor on 14 August 2013.

== International career ==
Kabze made his Turkey national team debut against Azerbaijan on 12 April 2006. Kabze also played three times for the Turkey national football B team in Future Cup'05 matches against Scotland, Germany and Czech Republic, scoring one goal each against Scotland and the Czech Republic. He played four times for Turkey U18. He scored two goals under-21

== Career statistics ==
As of 31 May 2013

=== Club ===
Club	Season	League		Cup		League Cup		Europe		Total	
Club	Season	Apps	Goals	Apps	Goals	Apps	Goals	Apps	Goals	Apps	Goals
Bucaspor	1999-00	4	0	0	0	-		-		4	0
Bucaspor	2000–01	27	5	1	1	-		-		28	6
Bucaspor	2001–02	26	9	0	0	-		-		26	9
Bucaspor	Total	57	14	1	1	0	0	0	0	58	15
Çanakkale Dardanelspor	2002–03	33	11	0	0	-		-		33	11
Çanakkale Dardanelspor	2003–04	19	2	0	0	-		-		19	2
Çanakkale Dardanelspor	2004–05	18	12	0	0	-		-		18	12
Çanakkale Dardanelspor	Total	70	25	0	0	0	0	0	0	70	25
Galatasaray	2004–05	14	7	2	1	-	-	-	-	16	8
Galatasaray	2005–06	18	6	4	1	-	-	-	-	22	7
Galatasaray	2006–07	22	3	6	1	-	-	-	-	28	4
Galatasaray	Total	54	16	12	3	0	0	0	0	66	19
Rubin Kazan	2007	11	4	0	0	-	-	-	-	11	4
Rubin Kazan	2008	23	2	4	0	-	-	-	-	27	2
Rubin Kazan	2009	14	2	1	0	-	-	-	-	15	2
Rubin Kazan	2010	5	0	0	0	-	-	-	-	5	0
Rubin Kazan	Total	53	8	5	0	0	0	0	0	58	8
Montpellier	2010–11	22	0	1	0	3	3	2	0	28	3
Montpellier	2011–12	1	0	0	0	2	0	0	0	3	0
Montpellier	Total	23	0	1	0	5	3	2	0	31	3
Orduspor	2011–12	9	2	0	0	6	1	-	-	15	3
Orduspor	2012–13	25	5	0	0	0	0	-	-	25	5
Orduspor	Total	34	7	0	0	6	1	0	0	40	8
Career total		291	70	19	4	11	4	2	0	323	78

=== International goals ===
As of 13 January 2013

#	Date	Venue	Opponent	Score	Result	Competition
1.	12 April 2006	Tofiq Bahramov Stadium, Baku, Azerbaijan	Azerbaijan	1–1	Draw	Friendly
2.	24 May 2006	Fenix Stadion, Genk, Belgium	Belgium	3–3	Draw	Friendly

== Honours ==
Galatasaray

- Super League: 2005–06
- Turkish Cup: 2005

Rubin Kazan

- Russian Premier League: 2008–09, 2009–10
- Russian Super Cup: 2010
