= João Batista (footballer, born 1975) =

Brazilian-Turkish footballer

Personal information
- Full name: João Batista Casemiro Marques
- Date of birth: 4 March 1975 (age 51)
- Place of birth: Santana de Cataguases, Brazil
- Height: 1.75 m (5 ft 9 in)
- Position: Midfielder

Senior career*
Years	Team	Apps	(Gls)
1996–2001	Gaziantepspor		
2001–2004	Galatasaray	59	(2)
2004–2005	Shakhtar Donetsk	11	(0)
2005–2008	Konyaspor	61	(1)
2008–2009	Kasımpaşa	18	(2)
Total		168	(8)
- * Club domestic league appearances and goals

João Batista Casemiro Marques (born 4 March 1975) is a former professional footballer who played the majority of his career in Turkey.

== Career ==
João Batista played for Gaziantepspor, Galatasaray, Konyaspor in Turkey and Shakhtar Donetsk in Ukraine.

== International career ==
Having not been capped by his native Brazil, Batista had the option of playing for Turkey if called up as Mehmet Aurélio. He was one of favourite player for Fatih Terim when he played for Galatasaray.

== Personal life ==
João Batista has dual Turkish citizenship with Mertol Karatay name on his passport.
