= Fevzi Elmas =

Turkish professional footballer

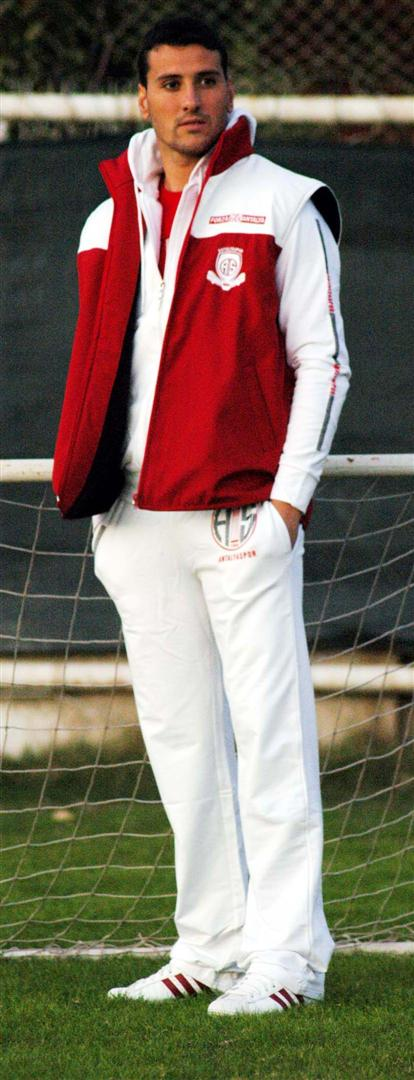

Personal information
- Date of birth: 9 June 1983 (age 43)
- Place of birth: Biga, Turkey
- Height: 1.82 m (6 ft 0 in)
- Position: Goalkeeper

Senior career*
| Years | Team | Apps | (Gls) |
| 1999–2005 | Dardanelspor | 16 | (0) |
| 2003–2004 | → Sakaryaspor (loan) | 3 | (0) |
| 2005–2007 | Galatasaray | 1 | (0) |
| 2007–2009 | Antalyaspor | 3 | (0) |
| 2009–2013 | Orduspor | 78 | (0) |
| 2013–2016 | Şanlıurfaspor | 59 | (0) |
| 2016–2017 | Adana Demirspor | 26 | (0) |
| 2017–2018 | Giresunspor | 0 | (0) |

International career
| 2001 | Turkey U19 | 1 | (0) |
| 2004–2005 | Turkey U21 | 6 | (0) |
- * Club domestic league appearances and goals

Fevzi Elmas (born 9 June 1983) is a Turkish former professional footballer who played as a goalkeeper.

== Career ==
Formerly, he played for Çanakkale Dardanelspor, Sakaryaspor, Galatasaray and Antalyaspor.

Elmas transferred to Antalyaspor from Galatasaray in July 2007. He played in one league match for Galatasaray in the Turkish Süper Lig during the 2004–05 season, appearing as a second-half substitute.
