= Çanakkale Dardanelspor =

Turkish sports club

Çanakkale Dardanel SK
- Full name: Çanakkale Dardanelspor Kulübü
- Founded: 26 July 1966; 59 years ago
- Ground: 18 Mart Stadium, Çanakkale
- Capacity: 12,692
- Chairman: Mehmet Önen
- Manager: Fadıl Kurt
- League: Amateur Football League
- 2022–23: 3.
- Website: www.dardanelspor.com.tr
Home colours	Away colours

Çanakkale Dardanelspor Kulübü is a sports club located in Çanakkale, Turkey.

== History ==
Çanakkale Dardanel SAŞ was founded as Çanakkalespor after merging Boğazspor, Türkgücü and Kalespor, which were amateur clubs of Çanakkale. The club's name was changed to Çanakkale Dardanelspor in 1991. When created in 1966, the football club began playing in the 3rd league in Turkey. This league is known as the TFFF 2. League today. Ten years after its founding, they were relegated to the amateur league in Turkey. After spending five years in the amateur league, they found themselves in the TFF First League, but only for one year in 1982–83 season. They were relegated to the amateur league once more. After spending just one more year in the amateur league, they were promoted to the third league in 1984, and would find themselves being yo-yoed between the third and second league until they reached the top flight of Turkish football in 1996. In 1999, they were relegated to the second league, and to third level in 2006 . They returned second level after defeating Tarsus İdman Yurdu as 5–0 at extra-play-off final in 2008–2009 season. However they suffered from squad narrowness at First League at next season and were relegated to Second League after a 3–0 loss to Altay at home match. In 2010–11 season they finished last of 2nd League Red Group and relegated to Third League, fourth level of Turkish League. This was their second consecutive relegation.

They have produced a healthy number of footballers who have gone on to play for a top flight club in Turkey. These players include Okan Koç, Tamer Tuna, Mehmet Yılmaz, Tolga Seyhan, Gökhan Zan, Mehmet Çoğum, Hasan Kabze, Erman Özgür, Mehmet Topal, Fevzi Elmas and Selçuk İnan.

== Attendances ==
- Turkish Super League: 1996–99
- TFF First League: 1982–83, 1986–87, 1993–96, 1999–06, 2009–10
- TFF Second League: 2006–09, 2010–11, 2013–2014
- TFF Third League: 1967–77, 1984–86, 1987–93, 2011–13, 2014–18
- Turkish Regional Amateur League: 2018–19
- Amateur Football League: 1977–82, 1983–84, 2019–

== Notable players ==
- (Turkey) Tolga Seyhan
- (Turkey) Okan Koç
- (Turkey) Mehmet Topal
- (Turkey) Fevzi Elmas
- (Turkey) Gökhan Zan
- (Turkey) Mehmet Yilmaz
- (Turkey) Mehmet Cogum
- (Turkey) Tamer Tuna
- (Turkey) Erman Özgür
- (Turkey) Selçuk İnan
- (Turkey) Hasan Kabze
