= Cihan Haspolatlı =

Turkish footballer

Personal information
- Full name: Cihan Haspolatlı
- Date of birth: 4 January 1980 (age 46)
- Place of birth: Diyarbakır, Turkey
- Height: 1.84 m (6 ft 0 in)
- Positions: Right full back; defensive midfielder

Senior career*
Years	Team	Apps	(Gls)
1998–2002	Kocaelispor	114	(6)
2002–2007	Galatasaray	126	(10)
2007–2008	Bursaspor	24	(1)
2008–2009	Konyaspor	31	(2)
2009–2010	Ankaragücü	15	(0)
2010–2013	İstanbul BB	70	(3)

International career^{‡}
2002–2003	Turkey	3	(1)
- * Club domestic league appearances and goals as of 06:22, 21 January 2013 (UTC) ‡ National team caps and goals as of 06:22, 21 January 2013 (UTC)

Cihan Haspolatlı (born 4 January 1980) is a former Turkish football player in midfield and right back positions.

== Club career ==
He played for Kocaelispor and Galatasaray. He was a key player while playing at Galatasaray, but was later on criticized by many supporters. Following the critics and his poor performance, he was sold to Bursaspor, then transferred to Konyaspor in 2008 and Ankaragücü in 2009.

== International career ==
Cihan was a part of the Turkey national team during the buildup to the 2002 World Cup Squad in Korea/Japan but missed out on selection to the final squad for the tournament.

== Honours ==
- Kocaelispor
  - Turkish Cup: 2002
- Galatasaray
  - Süper Lig: 2005-06
  - Turkish Cup: 2005

== Career statistics ==
=== International goals ===
Scores and results list. Turkey's goal tally first.

#	Date	Venue	Opponent	Score	Result	Competition
1.	August 21, 2002	Hüseyin Avni Aker Stadium, Trabzon, Turkey	Georgia	2–0	3–0	Friendly
