= 1999–2000 Galatasaray S.K. season =

Galatasaray
1999–2000 season
- President: (Turkey) Faruk Süren
- Head coach: (Turkey) Fatih Terim
- Stadium: Ali Sami Yen Stadı
- 1.Lig: 1st
- Turkish Cup: Winners
- UEFA Champions League: Group stage
- UEFA Cup: Winners
- Top goalscorer: League: Gheorghe Hagi (14); All: Gheorghe Hagi (25)
- Highest home attendance: 19,318 vs Gaziantepspor (1. Lig, 6 August 1999)
- Lowest home attendance: 7,797 vs Ankaraspor A.Ş. (Türkiye Kupası, 5 December 1999)
- Average home league attendance: 15,729
Home colours	Away colours	Third colours

The 1999–2000 season was Galatasaray's 96th in existence and the 42nd consecutive season in the 1. Lig. This article shows statistics of the club's players in the season, and also lists all matches that the club have played in the season. Galatasaray completed a treble of the 1.Lig, Turkish Cup and UEFA Cup.

== Club ==
=== Board of directors ===
Position	Staff
President	(Turkey) Faruk Süren
Second President	(Turkey) Ergun Gürsoy
Vice President	(Turkey) Ali Dürüst
Board Member	(Turkey) Mehmet Cansun
Board Member	(Turkey) Atilla Donat
Board Member	(Turkey) Ahmet Yolalan
Board Member	(Turkey) Osman Hattat
Board Member	(Turkey) Mustafa Sarıgül
Board Member	(Turkey) Ateş Ünal Erzen
Board Member	(Turkey) Varol Dereli
Board Member	(Turkey) Irfan Kurtoğlu

Elected as of 25 March 2000

Position	Staff
President	(Turkey) Faruk Süren
Second President	(Turkey) Mehmet Cansun
Vice President	(Turkey) Ali Dürüst
Board Member	(Turkey) Cem Şaşmaz
Board Member	(Turkey) Doç. Dr. Celal Erkut
Board Member	(Turkey) Osman Hattat
Board Member	(Turkey) Celal Gürcan
Board Member	(Turkey) Ibrahim Çağlar
Board Member	(Turkey) Aziz Üstel
Board Member	(Turkey) Burak Elmas

=== Facilities ===
Position	Staff
Stadium	(Turkey) Ali Sami Yen Stadium
Training facility	(Turkey) Florya Metin Oktay Facilities

== Squad statistics ==
No.	Pos.	Name	1. Lig		Türkiye Kupası		Europe		Total	
No.	Pos.	Name	Apps	Goals	Apps	Goals	Apps	Goals	Apps	Goals
1	GK	(Brazil) Claudio Taffarel	30	0	3	0	16	0	49	0
12	GK	(Turkey) Mehmet Bölükbaşı	5	0	1	0	2	0	8	0
30	GK	(Turkey) Kerem İnan	1	0	1	0	0	0	2	0
18	DF	(Turkey) Alper Tezcan	1	0	0	0	1	0	2	0
35	DF	(Brazil) Capone	25	3	4	1	17	3	46	7
4	DF	(Romania) Gheorghe Popescu	25	2	3	0	14	0	42	2
3	DF	(Turkey) Bülent Korkmaz (C)	22	0	3	1	8	0	33	1
14	DF	(Turkey) Fatih Akyel	17	0	2	0	10	1	29	1
21	DF	(Brazil) Bruno Quadros	0	0	0	0	2	0	2	0
2	DF	(Turkey) Vedat İnceefe	1	0	0	0	0	0	1	0
17	DF	(Turkey) Emrah Eren	10	0	1	0	1	0	12	0
33	DF	(Turkey) Hakan Ünsal	16	1	1	1	12	1	29	3
-	DF	(Turkey) Gündüz Gürol Azer	0	0	1	0	0	0	1	0
-	MF	(Turkey) Ceyhun Müderrisoğlu	0	0	1	0	0	0	1	0
67	MF	(Turkey) Ergün Penbe	28	1	3	0	13	0	44	1
7	MF	(Turkey) Okan Buruk	28	8	5	1	15	3	48	12
23	MF	(Turkey) Hasan Şaş	25	3	5	1	13	1	43	5
15	MF	(Turkey) Sergen Yalçın	18	4	3	2	0	0	21	6
20	MF	(Turkey) Tugay Kerimoğlu	10	1	1	0	5	1	16	2
8	MF	(Turkey) Suat Kaya	28	1	4	0	13	0	45	1
5	MF	(Turkey) Emre Belözoğlu	24	5	4	0	13	1	41	6
22	MF	(Turkey) Ümit Davala	28	0	5	2	13	3	46	5
10	MF	(Romania) Gheorghe Hagi	19	12	3	1	15	4	37	17
16	MF	(Turkey) Ahmet Yıldırım	17	2	1	0	13	0	31	2
-	MF	(Turkey) Osman Coşkun	1	0	0	0	0	0	1	0
13	MF	(Turkey) Mehmet Yozgatlı	9	0	2	1	1	0	12	1
11	FW	(Turkey) Saffet Akyüz	9	0	1	1	3	0	13	1
36	FW	(Brazil) Márcio Mixirica	23	9	5	3	6	0	34	12
6	FW	(Turkey) Arif Erdem	21	7	3	0	15	1	39	8
9	FW	(Turkey) Hakan Şükür	32	14	3	1	17	10	52	25

=== Players in / out ===
==== In ====
Pos.	Nat.	Name	Age	Moving from
DF	(Brazil)	Capone	27	Juventude
DF	(Brazil)	Bruno Quadros	22	CR Flamengo
FW	(Brazil)	Márcio Mixirica	24	Juventude
DF	(Turkey)	Emrah Eren	21	Adanaspor
MF	(Turkey)	Ahmet Yıldırım	25	Istanbulspor
FW	(Turkey)	Mehmet Yozgatlı	20	Istanbulspor
FW	(Turkey)	Saffet Akyüz	29	Istanbulspor
MF	(Turkey)	Sergen Yalçın	27	Siirtspor

==== Out ====
Pos.	Nat.	Name	Age	Moving to
FW	(Turkey)	Burak Akdiş	22	Göztepe SK on loan
GK	(Ghana)	Richard Kingson	21	Göztepe SK on loan
DF	(Brazil)	Bruno Quadros	22	Istanbulspor on loan
MF	(Turkey)	Tolunay Kafkas	31	Bursaspor on loan
MF	(Romania)	Ion Ionuț Luțu	27	Yimpaş Yozgatspor on loan
MF	(Turkey)	Ceyhun Eriş	22	Siirtspor
MF	(Turkey)	Osman Coşkun	27	MKE Ankaragücü
DF	(Australia)	Ufuk Talay	23	Bursaspor on loan
GK	(Turkey)	Volkan Kilimci	27	KSK Beveren
DF	(Turkey)	Vedat İnceefe	25	Istanbulspor on loan
MF	(Turkey)	Tugay Kerimoğlu	29	Rangers FC
FW	(Turkey)	Saffet Akyüz	29	MKE Ankaragücü on loan

== 1. Lig ==
=== Standings ===
Pos	Team	Pld	W	D	L	GF	GA	GD	Pts	Qualification or relegation
1	Galatasaray (C)	34	24	7	3	77	23	+54	79	Qualification to Champions League third qualifying round
2	Beşiktaş	34	23	6	5	74	27	+47	75	Qualification to Champions League second qualifying round
3	Gaziantepspor	34	17	11	6	49	27	+22	62	Qualification to UEFA Cup first round
4	Fenerbahçe	34	17	10	7	59	44	+15	61	
5	Gençlerbirliği	34	16	8	10	57	47	+10	56	

Rules for classification: 1) points; 2) goal difference; 3) number of goals scored.
(C) Champions

=== Matches ===
6 August 1999 1	Galatasaray SK	1–2	Gaziantepspor	Istanbul
19:00 EET	Gheorghe Hagi 10'	Report	Désiré Mbonabucya 22', 87'	Stadium: Ali Sami Yen Stadı; Referee: Bülent Uzun

15 August 1999 2	Trabzonspor	1–2	Galatasaray SK	Trabzon
19:00 EET	Hami Mandıralı 45p'	Report	Emre Belözoğlu 15'; Gheorghe Hagi 31'	Stadium: Hüseyin Avni Aker Stadium; Referee: Erol Ersoy

11 September 1999 3	Galatasaray SK	5–0	MKE Ankaragücü	Istanbul
19:00 EET	Gheorghe Hagi 10', 13'; Capone 34'; Arif Erdem 65'; Márcio Mixirica 83'	Report		Stadium: Ali Sami Yen Stadı; Referee: Sebahattin Şahin

17 September 1999 4	Adanaspor	3–4	Galatasaray SK	Adana
20:00 EET	Cafer Aydın 27', 57'; Ali Asım Balkaya 48'	(Report)	Tugay Kerimoğlu 6'; Hakan Şükür 36', 87'; Ahmet Yıldırım 68'	Stadium: Adana 5 Ocak Stadı; Referee: İbrahim Aksoy

24 September 1999 5	Samsunspor	0–1	Galatasaray SK	Samsun
20:00 EET		Report	Gheorghe Hagi 66'	Stadium: Samsun 19 Mayıs Stadium; Referee: Sadık İlhan

15 October 1999 6	Galatasaray SK	2–0	Antalyaspor	Istanbul
20:00 EET	Arif Erdem 8'; Capone 75'	Report		Stadium: Ali Sami Yen Stadı; Referee: Musa Eryılmaz

22 October 1999 7	Bursaspor	0–0	Galatasaray SK	Bursa
20:00 EET		(Report)		Stadium: Bursa Atatürk Stadı; Referee: Oğuz Sarvan

29 October 1999 8	Galatasaray SK	2–0	Göztepe SK	Istanbul
20:00 EET	Gheorghe Popescu 5p' Hakan Şükür 48'	Report		Stadium: Ali Sami Yen Stadı; Referee: Mustafa Çulcu

28 November 1999 9	Galatasaray SK	4–1	Erzurumspor	Istanbul
19:00 EET	Okan Buruk 42', 58'; Emre Belözoğlu 69'; Hakan Şükür 71p'	Report	Zafer Demir 79'	Stadium: Ali Sami Yen Stadı; Referee: Metin Tokat

3 December 1999 10	Gençlerbirliği SK	1–1	Galatasaray SK	Ankara
20:00 EET	Alfred Phiri 75'	Report	Hakan Şükür 12'	Stadium: Ankara 19 Mayıs Stadium; Referee: Oğuz Sarvan

12 December 1999 11	Galatasaray SK	1–0	Beşiktaş JK	Istanbul
19:00 EET	Okan Buruk 28'	Report		Stadium: Ali Sami Yen Stadı; Referee: Orhan Erdemir

18 December 1999 12	Denizlispor	2–4	Galatasaray SK	Denizli
19:00 EET	Mohamed Youssef 14'; Veysel Cihan 66'	(Report)	Okan Buruk 12'; Márcio Mixirica 23'; Hasan Şaş 63'; Emre Belözoğlu 81'	Stadium: Denizli Atatürk Stadı; Referee: İbrahim Aksoy

22 December 1999 13	Fenerbahçe SK	1–2	Galatasaray SK	Istanbul
19:00 EET	Viorel Moldovan 52'	Report	Hasan Şaş 23'; Márcio Mixirica 30'	Stadium: Şükrü Saracoğlu Stadium; Referee: Muhittin Boşat

26 December 1999 14	Galatasaray SK	2–1	Vanspor	Istanbul
19:00 EET	Okan Buruk 34'; Arif Erdem 58'	Report	Kubilay Toptaş 36'	Stadium: Ali Sami Yen Stadı; Referee: Cem Tosyalı

9 January 2000 15	Kocaelispor	1–2	Galatasaray SK	İzmit
19:00 EET	Roman Dąbrowski 84'	Report	Gheorghe Hagi 35'; Okan Buruk 66'	Stadium: İsmet Paşa Stadium; Referee: Erol Ersoy

15 January 2000 16	Galatasaray SK	3–1	Altay S.K.	Istanbul
19:00 EET	Gheorghe Hagi 4'; Capone 57'; Emre Belözoğlu 80'	Report	Emre Güsar 69'	Stadium: Ali Sami Yen Stadı; Referee: Zafer Önder İpek

23 January 2000 17	Istanbulspor	0–0	Galatasaray SK	Istanbul
13:30 EET		(Report)		Stadium: Çetin Emeç Stadium; Referee: Mustafa Kalkandelen

30 January 2000 18	Gaziantepspor	0–1	Galatasaray SK	Gaziantep
19:00 EET		Report	Hakan Şükür 44'	Stadium: Kamil Ocak Stadium; Referee: Metin Tokat

6 February 2000 19	Galatasaray SK	2–0	Trabzonspor	Istanbul
19:00 EET	Okan Buruk 44'; Hakan Şükür 49'	(Report)		Stadium: Ali Sami Yen Stadı; Referee: Kadir Tozlu

13 February 2000 20	MKE Ankaragücü	0–2	Galatasaray SK	Ankara
19:00 EET		Report	Gheorghe Hagi 32'; Yasin Çelik 52og'	Stadium: Ankara 19 Mayıs Stadium; Referee: Serdar Tatlı

20 February 2000 21	Galatasaray SK	4–0	Adanaspor	Istanbul
19:00 EET	Hakan Şükür 29', 56'; Gheorghe Popescu 52'; Arif Erdem 75'	Report		Stadium: Ali Sami Yen Stadı; Referee: Mustafa Çulcu

25 February 2000 22	Galatasaray SK	3–1	Samsunspor	Istanbul
20:00 EET	Hakan Şükür 23'; Sergen Yalçın 37'; Suat Kaya 70'	Report	İsmet Taşdemir 72'	Stadium: Ali Sami Yen Stadı; Referee: Bülent Uzun

5 March 2000 23	Antalyaspor	1–3	Galatasaray SK	Antalya
19:00 EET	Kamil Çakır 43'	(Report)	Hakan Şükür 22'; Arif Erdem 33', 45'	Stadium: Atatürk Stadı; Referee: Mutlu Çelik

12 March 2000 24	Galatasaray SK	6–0	Bursaspor	Istanbul
19:00 EET	Márcio Mixirica 10', 41'; Hakan Şükür 20p' Sergen Yalçın 36'; Ergün Penbe 72'; Ahmet Yıldırım 85'	Report		Stadium: Ali Sami Yen Stadı; Referee: Ünsal Çimen

19 March 2000 25	Göztepe SK	0–2	Galatasaray SK	İzmir
19:00 EET		Report	Sergen Yalçın 5'; Gheorghe Hagi 42'	Stadium: İzmir Atatürk Stadium; Referee: Metin Tokat

26 March 2000 26	Galatasaray SK	0–1	Fenerbahçe SK	Istanbul
19:00 EET		Report	Samuel Johnson 82'	Stadium: Ali Sami Yen Stadı; Referee: Erol Ersoy

1 April 2000 27	Erzurumspor	0–0	Galatasaray SK	Erzurum
12:00 EET		(Report)		Stadium: Cemal Gürsel Stadı; Referee: Murat Ilgaz

9 April 2000 28	Galatasaray SK	6–0	Gençlerbirliği SK	Istanbul
19:00 EET	Ümit Özat 10og' Hasan Şaş 23'; Arif Erdem 35'; Emre Belözoğlu 42'; Gheorghe Hagi 73'; Hakan Şükür 87'	Report		Stadium: Ali Sami Yen Stadı; Referee: Sebahattin Bitirim

14 April 2000 29	Beşiktaş JK	1–1	Galatasaray SK	Istanbul
20:00 EET	Mehmet Özdilek 30'	Report	Sead Halilagić 80og'	Stadium: İnönü Stadium; Referee: Oğuz Sarvan

23 April 2000 30	Galatasaray SK	2–2	Denizlispor	Istanbul
19:00 EET	Gheorghe Hagi 46'; Márcio Mixirica 90'	Report	Doncho Donev 72'; Mohammed Ali Kurtuluş 82'	Stadium: Ali Sami Yen Stadı; Referee: Yılnur Önen

29 April 2000 31	Vanspor	1–3	Galatasaray SK	Van
19:00 EET	Fernand Coulibaly 83'	(Report)	Gheorghe Hagi 32'; Sergen Yalçın 36'; Márcio Mixirica 77'	Stadium: Atatürk Stadı; Referee: Selçuk Dereli

7 May 2000 32	Galatasaray SK	5–0	Kocaelispor	Istanbul
19:00 EET	Okan Buruk 27'; Márcio Mixirica 50', 74'; Hakan Şükür 69'; Hakan Ünsal 89'	Report		Stadium: Ali Sami Yen Stadı; Referee: Serdar Tatlı

12 May 2000 33	Altay SK	1–0	Galatasaray SK	İzmir
17:30 EET	Telat Özden 28'	Report		Stadium: İzmir Atatürk Stadium; Referee: Metin Tokat

21 May 2000 34	Galatasaray SK	1–1	Istanbulspor	Istanbul
19:00 EET	Recep Çetin 71og'	Report	Mithat Yavaş 40'	Stadium: Ali Sami Yen Stadı; Referee: Muhittin Boşat

== Türkiye Kupası ==
Kick-off listed in local time (EET)

=== Third round ===
15 December 1999 1	Galatasaray SK	5–1	Ankaraspor A.Ş.	Istanbul
21:00 EET	Bülent Korkmaz 8'; Márcio Mixirica 16', 33'; Saffet Akyüz 17'; Ümit Davala 82'	(Report)	Bayram Çolak 49'	Stadium: Ali Sami Yen Stadı; Attendance: 7,797; Referee: Selçuk Dereli

=== Fourth round ===
19 January 2000 1	Galatasaray SK	2–1	Samsunspor	Istanbul
21:00 EET	Gheorghe Hagi 68'; Capone 77'	(Report)	İlhan Mansız 13'	Stadium: Ali Sami Yen Stadı; Referee: Murat Ilgaz

=== Quarter-final ===
2 February 2000 1	Trabzonspor	1–2	Galatasaray SK	Trabzon
20:00 EET	Davor Vugrinec 14'	(Report)	Sergen Yalçın 66', 71'	Stadium: Hüseyin Avni Aker Stadı; Referee: Oğuz Sarvan

=== Semi-final ===
16 February 2000	MKE Ankaragücü	0–2	Galatasaray SK	Ankara
20:30 EET		(Report)	Okan Buruk 32'; Hasan Şaş 87'	Stadium: Ankara 19 Mayıs Stadı; Referee: Erol Ersoy

=== Final ===
3 May 2000	Antalyaspor	3–5 (a.e.t.)	Galatasaray SK	Diyarbakır
15:00 EET	Mustafa Gürsel 40'; Zafer Demiray 70'; Kamil Çakır 94'	(Report)	Ümit Davala 13'; Márcio Mixirica 72'; Hakan Ünsal 99'; Mehmet Yozgatlı 112'; Hakan Şükür 113'	Stadium: Atatürk Stadı; Attendance: 14,000; Referee: Metin Tokat

== UEFA Champions League ==
=== Third qualifying round ===
11 August 1999 1	SK Rapid Wien	0–3	Galatasaray SK	Vienna
21:45 EET		(Report)	Hakan Ünsal 34'; Fatih Akyel 38'; Gheorghe Hagi 90'	Stadium: Ernst-Happel-Stadion; Referee: (Denmark) Kim Milton Nielsen

25 August 1999 2	Galatasaray SK	1–0 (4–0 agg.)	SK Rapid Wien	Istanbul
21:45 EET	Okan Buruk 52'	(Report)		Stadium: Ali Sami Yen Stadı; Referee: (Italy) Pierluigi Collina

=== Group stage ===
Pos	Team	Pld	W	D	L	GF	GA	GD	Pts	Qualification
1	(England) Chelsea	6	3	2	1	10	3	+7	11	Advance to second group stage
2	(Germany) Hertha BSC	6	2	2	2	7	10	−3	8	Advance to second group stage
3	(Turkey) Galatasaray	6	2	1	3	10	13	−3	7	Transfer to UEFA Cup
4	(Italy) Milan	6	1	3	2	6	7	−1	6	

Source: UEFA

14 September 1999 1	Galatasaray SK	2–2	Hertha BSC	Istanbul
21:45 EET	Hakan Şükür 23'; Gheorghe Hagi 86p'	Report	Michael Preetz 12'; Dariusz Wosz 13'	Stadium: Ali Sami Yen Stadı; Attendance: 23,000; Referee: (Switzerland) Urs Meier

21 September 1999 2	AC Milan	2–1	Galatasaray SK	Milan
21:45 EET	Leonardo Araújo 44'; Andriy Shevchenko 45'	Report	Ümit Davala 50'	Stadium: San Siro; Attendance: 37,822; Referee: (Scotland) Hugh Dallas

29 September 1999 3	Chelsea FC	1–0	Galatasaray SK	London
21:45 EET	Dan Petrescu 55'	Report		Stadium: Stamford Bridge; Attendance: 33,426; Referee: (Netherlands) Dick Jol

19 October 1999 4	Galatasaray SK	0–5	Chelsea FC	Istanbul
21:45 EET		Report	Tore André Flo 32', 49'; Gianfranco Zola 54'; Dennis Wise 79'; Gabriele Ambrosetti 88'	Stadium: Ali Sami Yen Stadı; Attendance: 20,600; Referee: (Portugal) Vítor Melo Pereira

27 October 1999 5	Hertha BSC	1–4	Galatasaray SK	Berlin
21:45 EET	Kjetil Rekdal 36p'	Report	Hakan Şükür 48', 66'; Tugay Kerimoğlu 81'; Okan Buruk 90'	Stadium: Olympiastadion; Attendance: 71,520; Referee: (Denmark) Kim Milton Nielsen

3 November 1999 6	Galatasaray SK	3–2	AC Milan	Istanbul
21:45 EET	Capone 27'; Hakan Şükür 87'; Ümit Davala 90'	Report	George Weah 20'; Federico Giunti 51'	Stadium: Ali Sami Yen Stadı; Attendance: 17,361; Referee: (Spain) Antonio López Nieto

== UEFA Cup ==
=== Third round ===
23 November 1999 1	Bologna F.C. 1909	1–1	Galatasaray SK	Bologna
	Giuseppe Signori 66'	(Report)	Hakan Şükür 81'	Stadium: Stadio Renato Dall'Ara; Attendance: 25,000; Referee: (England) Graham Poll

9 December 1999 2	Galatasaray SK	2–1 (3–2 agg.)	Bologna F.C. 1909	Istanbul
	Hasan Şaş 5'; Ümit Davala 30'	(Report)	Nicola Ventola 8'	Stadium: Ali Sami Yen Stadı; Attendance: 23,000; Referee: (Austria) Günter Benkö

=== Fourth round ===
2 March 2000	Borussia Dortmund	0–2	Galatasaray SK	Dortmund
		(Report)	Hakan Şükür 32'; Gheorghe Hagi 45'	Stadium: Westfalenstadion; Attendance: 52,400; Referee: (Portugal) Vítor Melo Pereira

9 March 2000	Galatasaray SK	0–0 (2–0 agg.)	Borussia Dortmund	Istanbul
		(Report)		Stadium: Ali Sami Yen Stadı; Attendance: 35,000; Referee: (Italy) Graziano Cesari

=== Quarter-final ===
16 March 2000	RCD Mallorca	1–4	Galatasaray SK	Palmal
	Lauren 78'	(Report)	Arif Erdem 44'; Emre Belözoğlu 48'; Hakan Şükür 59'; Okan Buruk 65'	Stadium: Son Moix; Attendance: 20,000; Referee: (Netherlands) Dick Jol

23 March 2000	Galatasaray SK	2–1 (6–2 agg.)	RCD Mallorca	Istanbul
	Capone 33'; Hakan Şükür 45+1'	(Report)	Carlitos 62'	Stadium: Ali Sami Yen Stadı; Attendance: 11,986; Referee: (Italy) Stefano Braschi

=== Semi-final ===
6 April 2000	Galatasaray SK	2–0	Leeds United FC	Istanbul
20:30	Hakan Şükür 13'; Capone 44'	(Report)		Stadium: Ali Sami Yen Stadı; Attendance: 17,819; Referee: (Germany) Hellmut Krug

20 April 2000	Leeds United FC	2–2 (2–4 agg.)	Galatasaray SK	Leeds
21:00	Eirik Bakke 16', 68'	(Report)	Gheorghe Hagi 5p' Hakan Şükür 42'	Stadium: Elland Road; Attendance: 38,306; Referee: (Slovakia) Ľuboš Micheľ

=== Final ===
17 May 2000	Galatasaray SK	0–0 (a.e.t.) (4–1 p)	Arsenal FC	Copenhagen
21:45 EET		Report		Stadium: Parken Stadium, Copenhagen; Attendance: 38,919; Referee: (Spain) Antonio López Nieto; Man of the Match: Cláudio Taffarel
	Penalties
	Ergün Penbe (penalty scored); Hakan Şükür (penalty scored); Ümit Davala (penalty scored); Gheorghe Popescu (penalty scored)		(penalty missed) Davor Šuker; (penalty scored) Ray Parlour; (penalty missed) Patrick Vieira

== Friendlies ==
=== TSYD Kupası ===
22 July 1999 1	Galatasaray SK	1–0	Beşiktaş JK	Istanbul
21:30 EET	Hakan Ünsal 87'	(Report)		Stadium: Ali Sami Yen Stadı; Referee: İsmet Cengiz

24 July 1999 1	Fenerbahçe SK	1–1	Galatasaray SK	Istanbul
20:30 EET	Alpay Özalan 46'	(Report)	Gheorghe Hagi 3'	Stadium: Fenerbahçe Stadı; Referee: Mustafa Kalkandelen

== Attendance ==
Competition	Av. Att.	Total Att.
1. Lig	15,729	267,401
Türkiye Kupası	7,855	15,710
UEFA Cup	16,102	128,815
Total	15,256	411,926
