= Galatasaray S.K. in international football =

Turkish club in European football

- Club: Galatasaray
- Most appearances: Bülent Korkmaz (101)
- Top scorer: Hakan Şükür (37)
- First entry: 1956–57 European Cup
- Latest entry: 2026–27 UEFA Champions League

Titles
- Europa League: 1: 2000
- Super Cup: 1: 2000

Galatasaray S.K. is a Turkish professional football club, found in 1905 by Ali Sami Yen, based on the European side of the city of Istanbul in Turkey. The club is Turkey's most successful football team in UEFA competitions.

Gala has first participated in a European competition in 1956, entering the European Cup, and have competed in forty eight seasons of European competitions since then. The club has achieved their most successful period in late 80s, the millennium year (2000) and beyond. They have won once both the UEFA Cup and the UEFA Super Cup title. Making them the first and only Turkish club to have won a European competition trophy. The successful millennium year resulted also in a qualification to the FIFA Club World Cup, but the second edition of the tournament had been cancelled owing to a combination of factors such as the collapse of FIFA's marketing partner in same year. Despite having reached several times the quarter-finals and also once the semi-finals of the UEFA Champions League campaign, the club has not won the trophy so far.

== History ==
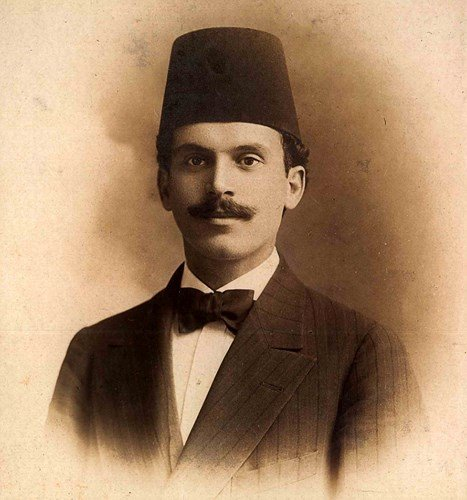

"Our aim is to play together like Englishmen, to have a color and a name, and to beat the non-Turkish teams".

—Ali Sami Yen, about the founding mission of Galatasaray.

=== Begin of the European era ===
Gündüz Kılıç started managing Galatasaray back in 1952, and it was under him that the team first competed in European competition in 1956–57, qualifying for the European Cup by winning the regional Istanbul Football League the previous season. The first game was a preliminary round game against Romanian side Dinamo București which ended up in a 3–4 loss on aggregate.

The 1969–70 European Cup season was a remarkable one, because the club make it to the quarter finals. In that round the opponent Legia Warsaw won the clash 1–3 on aggregate.

=== Knocking the doors of Europe: 1988–89 European Cup ===
The first-ever European success was achieved during the 1988–89 season of the European Cup club competition, when the club was being coached by Mustafa Denizli. Galatasaray started in the first round and reached the semi-finals where they got eliminated by Romanian club Steaua București and future Gala legend Gheorghe Hagi. Throughout the competition Galatasaray has played against Rapid Wien, Neuchâtel Xamax, Monaco and Steaua București. The second round game against Neuchâtel Xamax was an incredible one; Galatasaray lost the away game by 3-0 and the return game was being played in front of 35,000 fans at the Ali Sami Yen stadium and Galatasaray won the game by 5–0 and promoted to the quarter-finals on 5–3 aggregate.

=== The weather conditions were the real opponents: 1991–92 season ===
Galatasaray had built a strong squad that season and reached the quarter-finals after eliminating Stahl Eisenhüttenstadt and Baník Ostrava. In the quarter-finals, the opponents were German side Werder Bremen and Galatasaray took the lead 0–1 in the first game, but eventually lost the game (1–2). Unfortunately, the second leg at Ali Sami Yen was played in bad weather conditions due to snowfall during the match. Both sides failed to score and Werder Bremen won 2–1 on aggregate. That year, the German side won the trophy and according to many analysts, Galatasaray would have won the cup if they could have knocked out Werder Bremen in Istanbul.

=== The unforgettable millennium season ===
==== 1999–2000 UEFA Cup ====
17 May 2000	Galatasaray (Turkey)	0–0 (a.e.t.) (4–1 p)	(England) Arsenal	Parken Stadium, Copenhagen
20:45 CEST		Report		Attendance: 38,919; Referee: Antonio López Nieto (Spain)
	Penalties
	Penbe (penalty scored); Şükür (penalty scored); Davala (penalty scored); Popescu (penalty scored)		(penalty missed) Šuker; (penalty scored) Parlour; (penalty missed) Vieira

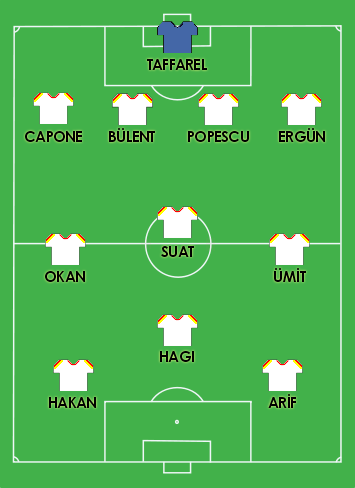
UEFA Cup Final match line-up against Arsenal, 17 May 2000

The 1999–2000 UEFA Cup competition was won by Galatasaray after they defeated Arsenal in the final. The victory marked the first time a Turkish side had won a European club football trophy, prompting wild celebrations on the streets of Istanbul.

Galatasaray entered the competition after finishing in third position in Group H after the first group stage of the 1999–2000 UEFA Champions League, resulting in their transfer to the UEFA Cup, ahead of fourth-placed Milan. Their final group stage victory, against Milan, began a series of victories against Bologna, Borussia Dortmund, Mallorca and Leeds United en route to the final, held at Parken Stadium in Copenhagen.

The final was scoreless through both the first 90 minutes and after extra time. After 94th minute Gala played remaining part of the extra time with 10 players; Gheorghe Hagi received a straight red card, after game footage showed the player holding and striking Tony Adams in the back; the Arsenal captain was awarded a yellow card for hitting Hagi during the altercation. In the ensuing penalty shoot-out, Patrick Vieira and Davor Šuker missed for Arsenal, while Galatasaray's Ergün Penbe, Hakan Şükür, Ümit Davala all converted past goalkeeper David Seaman. Gheorghe Popescu then scored the winning kick to win the UEFA Cup for Galatasaray.

Galatasaray had won an impressive treble that season, also winning the Süper Lig and the Turkish Cup.

==== 2000 UEFA Super Cup ====
25 August 2000	Real Madrid (Spain)	1–2 (a.e.t.)	(Turkey) Galatasaray	Stade Louis II, Monaco
20:45 CEST	Raúl 79' (pen.)	Report	Jardel 41' (pen.), 102'	Attendance: 15,000; Referee: Günter Benkö (Austria)

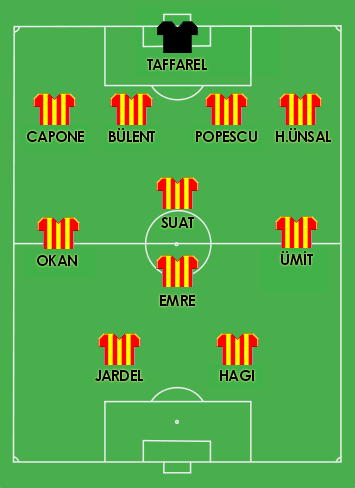
Super Cup match line-up against Real Madrid, 25 August 2000

=== 2000 UEFA Super Cup ===
On 25 August 2000, Galatasaray won the 2000 UEFA Super Cup by defeating Real Madrid 2–1 after extra time at the Stade Louis II in Monaco. The match featured new signing Luis Figo, making his first competitive appearance for his club. Galatasaray opened the scoring in the 41st minute with a penalty converted by Mário Jardel, after Hakan Ünsal was fouled in the box. Real Madrid equalised in the 79th minute through a goal by Raúl. In the 103rd minute of extra time, Jardel struck again with a "golden goal", securing Galatasaray's first UEFA Super Cup title. With the win, Galatasaray became the first and the only Turkish club to lift this trophy.

=== 2000s ===
==== UEFA Champions League Campaigns ====
In the 2000–01 season season, Galatasaray reached the UEFA Champions League quarter-finals for the first time since the 1988–89 season. After progressing through two group stages, they faced their last UEFA Super Cup final opponent Real Madrid again. Galatasaray won the first leg 3–2 at Ali Sami Yen but lost 3–0 in the return leg at the Santiago Bernabéu, resulting in a 5–3 aggregate defeat. The following season, 2001–02, Galatasaray reached the second group stage but finished fourth in their group, which included Barcelona, Liverpool, and Roma. In the 2002–03 season, Galatasaray participated in the first group stage but failed to progress, finishing fourth behind Barcelona, Lokomotiv Moscow, and Club Brugge. During the 2003–04 season, Galatasaray entered the competition in the third qualifying round, defeating CSKA Sofia with a 6–0 aggregate score. However, they were eliminated in the first round of the UEFA Cup by Villarreal.

==== UEFA Cup and Europa League Appearances ====
In the 2003–04 UEFA Cup, after being eliminated from the Champions League qualifiers, Galatasaray entered the competition but were knocked out in the first round by Villarreal. The 2004–05 season saw Galatasaray reach the group stage but fail to advance further. In the 2007–08 UEFA Cup, Galatasaray progressed to the Round of 16, defeating teams like Bordeaux in the Round of 32 but were eliminated by Hamburger SV with a 4–3 aggregate score. During the 2009–10 UEFA Europa League, under coach Frank Rijkaard, Galatasaray had a strong group stage performance, finishing first in Group F. They were eliminated in the Round of 32 by Atlético Madrid, who went on to win the tournament.

== Overall record ==
=== By competition ===
As of 3 November 2026

Competition	Pld	W	D	L	GF	GA	GD	W%
European Cup / UEFA Champions League	207	70	47	90	264	330	−66	33.82
UEFA Cup / UEFA Europa League	104	40	36	28	168	141	+27	38.46
UEFA Super Cup	1	1	0	0	2	1	+1	100.00
UEFA Cup Winners' Cup	32	12	7	13	42	55	−13	37.50
Total	344	123	90	131	476	527	−51	35.76

Legend: Pld = Matches played. W= Wins. D = Draws. L = Losses. GF = Goals For. GA = Goals Against. GD = Goal Difference. W% = Win percentage.

=== By club/country ===
As of 3 November 2026

Country	Club	Pld	W	D	L	GF	GA	GD
Albania	Vllaznia	2	2	0	0	6	1	+5
Subtotal		2	2	0	0	6	1	+5
Austria	Austria Wien	3	1	1	1	3	4	–1
Austria	Rapid Wien	8	4	0	4	13	13	0
Austria	Sturm Graz	4	0	2	2	3	7	–4
Subtotal		15	5	3	7	19	24	–5
Azerbaijan	Neftçi	1	1	0	0	3	1	+2
Subtotal		1	1	0	0	3	1	+2
Belgium	Anderlecht	4	0	1	3	3	13	–10
Belgium	Club Brugge	4	0	3	1	2	4	–2
Belgium	Union Saint-Gilloise	1	0	0	1	0	1	–1
Subtotal		9	0	4	5	5	18	–13
Bulgaria	CSKA Sofia	2	2	0	0	6	0	+6
Bulgaria	Levski Sofia	2	1	1	0	3	2	+1
Subtotal		4	3	1	0	9	2	+7
Croatia	Hajduk Split	1	1	0	0	2	0	+2
Croatia	Slaven Koprivnica	2	2	0	0	4	2	+2
Subtotal		3	3	0	0	6	2	+4
Czech Republic; Czechoslovakia	Baník Ostrava	2	1	0	1	2	2	0
Czech Republic; Czechoslovakia	Mladá Boleslav	2	1	1	0	6	3	+3
Czech Republic; Czechoslovakia	Sparta Prague	6	2	1	3	8	13	–5
Subtotal		10	4	2	4	16	18	–2
Denmark	Copenhagen	4	1	1	2	5	5	0
Denmark	Randers	2	1	1	0	3	2	+1
Subtotal		6	2	2	2	8	7	+1
England	Arsenal	3	0	1	2	2	8	–6
England	Chelsea	4	0	1	3	1	9	–8
England	Leeds United	2	1	1	0	4	2	+2
England	Liverpool	7	3	2	2	8	10	–2
England	Manchester City	1	0	0	1	0	2	–2
England	Manchester United	8	2	4	2	10	13	–3
England	Tottenham Hotspur	1	1	0	0	3	2	+1
England	West Bromwich Albion	2	0	0	2	2	6	–4
Subtotal		28	7	9	12	30	52	–22
Estonia	Levadia Tallinn	2	1	1	0	6	1	+5
Subtotal		2	1	1	0	6	1	+5
Finland	Lahti	2	1	1	0	3	2	+1
Subtotal		2	1	1	0	3	2	+1
France	Bordeaux	5	1	2	2	6	8	–2
France	Lille	1	1	0	0	4	2	+2
France	Marseille	2	1	1	0	4	2	+2
France	Monaco	7	2	1	4	7	13	–6
France	Nantes	2	1	1	0	1	0	+1
France	Paris Saint-Germain	6	2	0	4	5	14	–9
Subtotal		23	8	5	10	27	39	–12
Germany; East Germany; West Germany	1. FC Magdeburg	3	0	3	0	3	3	0
Germany; East Germany; West Germany	Bayer Leverkusen	2	0	1	1	1	5	–4
Germany; East Germany; West Germany	Bayern Munich	4	0	1	3	3	12	–9
Germany; East Germany; West Germany	Borussia Dortmund	6	1	1	4	4	13	–9
Germany; East Germany; West Germany	Eintracht Frankfurt	3	1	1	1	2	5	–3
Germany; East Germany; West Germany	Hamburger	2	0	1	1	3	4	–1
Germany; East Germany; West Germany	Hertha	3	2	1	0	7	3	+4
Germany; East Germany; West Germany	Uerdingen	2	0	1	1	1	3	–2
Germany; East Germany; West Germany	Schalke 04	4	1	2	1	4	5	–1
Germany; East Germany; West Germany	Stahl Eisenhüttenstadt	2	2	0	0	5	1	+4
Germany; East Germany; West Germany	Stuttgart	1	1	0	0	2	0	+2
Germany; East Germany; West Germany	Werder Bremen	2	0	1	1	1	2	–1
Subtotal		34	8	13	13	36	56	–20
Greece	Olympiacos	3	2	0	1	2	3	–1
Greece	Panathinaikos	2	2	0	0	4	1	+3
Greece	Panionios	1	1	0	0	3	0	+3
Greece	PAOK	1	1	0	0	3	1	+2
Subtotal		7	6	0	1	12	5	+7
Hungary	Ferencváros	2	1	0	1	4	2	+2
Subtotal		2	1	0	1	4	2	+2
(Republic of Ireland) Ireland	Cork City	2	2	0	0	3	1	+2
(Republic of Ireland) Ireland	Waterford	2	2	0	0	5	2	+3
Subtotal		4	4	0	0	8	3	+5
Israel	Maccabi Netanya	2	2	0	0	10	1	+9
Subtotal		2	2	0	0	10	1	+9
Italy	Bologna	2	1	1	0	3	2	+1
Italy	Juventus	8	3	3	2	16	12	+4
Italy	Lazio	6	2	2	2	4	5	–1
Italy	Milan	6	2	1	3	9	14	–5
Italy	Parma	2	0	1	1	1	3	–2
Italy	Roma	4	1	2	1	6	7	–1
Subtotal		28	9	10	9	39	43	–4
Kazakhstan	Astana	2	0	2	0	3	3	0
Kazakhstan	Tobol	2	1	1	0	3	1	+2
Subtotal		4	1	3	0	6	4	+2
Latvia	RFS	1	0	1	0	2	2	0
Subtotal		1	0	1	0	2	2	0
Lithuania	Žalgiris	2	1	1	0	3	2	0
Subtotal		2	1	1	0	3	2	+1
Luxembourg	Avenir Beggen	2	2	0	0	9	1	+8
Subtotal		2	2	0	0	9	1	+8
Moldova	Tiraspol	2	2	0	0	5	0	+5
Subtotal		2	2	0	0	5	0	+5
Netherlands	Ajax	2	1	0	1	4	2	2
Netherlands	AZ	3	0	2	1	4	7	–3
Netherlands	PSV	8	2	0	6	8	17	–9
Subtotal		13	3	2	8	16	26	–10
Norway	Bodø/Glimt	1	1	0	0	3	1	2
Norway	Molde	2	2	0	0	5	3	+2
Norway	Rosenborg	2	1	0	1	3	3	0
Norway	Tromsø	2	0	1	1	1	2	–1
Subtotal		7	4	1	2	12	9	3
Poland	Katowice	2	1	1	0	2	1	+1
Poland	Legia Warsaw	5	1	1	3	3	6	–3
Poland	Polonia Bytom	2	1	0	1	4	2	+2
Poland	Widzew Łódź	2	1	0	1	2	2	0
Subtotal		11	4	2	5	11	11	0
Portugal	Benfica	5	2	1	2	6	5	+1
Portugal	Braga	2	1	0	1	2	3	–1
Portugal	Porto	2	0	0	2	2	4	–2
Portugal	Sporting	1	0	0	1	1	3	–2
Subtotal		10	3	1	6	11	15	–4
Romania	CFR Cluj	2	1	1	0	4	2	+2
Romania	Dinamo București	6	4	1	1	14	6	+8
Romania	FC U Craiova	2	1	0	1	2	3	–1
Romania	Steaua București	4	0	2	2	3	8	–5
Subtotal		14	6	4	4	23	19	+4
Russia; Soviet Union	CSKA Moscow	2	0	1	1	1	4	–3
Russia; Soviet Union	Lokomotiv Moscow	6	3	1	2	8	5	+3
Russia; Soviet Union	Spartak Moscow	2	0	1	1	1	2	–1
Russia; Soviet Union	Torpedo Moscow	2	0	0	2	2	7	–5
Subtotal		12	3	3	6	12	18	–6
Scotland	Rangers	3	1	1	1	4	4	0
Scotland	St Johnstone	2	1	1	0	5	3	+2
Subtotal		5	2	2	1	9	7	+2
Serbia (Socialist Federal Republic of Yugoslavia) Yugoslavia	OFK Beograd	2	1	1	0	7	3	+4
Serbia (Socialist Federal Republic of Yugoslavia) Yugoslavia	Red Star Belgrade	4	0	2	2	2	6	–4
Subtotal		6	1	3	2	9	9	0
Slovakia; Czechoslovakia	Spartak Trnava	2	1	0	1	1	1	0
Subtotal		2	1	0	1	1	1	0
Slovenia	Olimpija Ljubljana	2	2	0	0	4	0	+4
Subtotal		2	2	0	0	4	0	+4
Spain	Athletic Bilbao	2	1	0	1	2	2	0
Spain	Atlético Madrid	7	0	3	4	3	9	–6
Spain	Barcelona	11	1	3	7	8	20	–12
Spain	Deportivo La Coruña	2	1	0	1	1	2	–1
Spain	Mallorca	2	2	0	0	6	2	+4
Spain	Real Madrid	9	3	0	6	10	28	–18
Spain	Real Sociedad	2	0	1	1	2	3	–1
Spain	Villarreal	2	0	1	1	2	5	–3
Subtotal		37	8	8	21	34	71	–37
Sweden	AIK	2	1	1	0	3	2	+1
Sweden	IF Elfsborg	1	1	0	0	4	3	+1
Sweden	IFK Göteborg	2	0	0	2	0	2	–2
Sweden	Helsingborgs IF	1	0	0	1	2	3	–1
Sweden	Malmö FF	1	0	1	0	2	2	0
Sweden	Östersund	2	0	1	1	1	3	–2
Subtotal		9	2	3	4	12	15	–3
Switzerland	Bellinzona	2	2	0	0	6	4	+2
Switzerland	Grasshopper	2	2	0	0	5	3	+2
Switzerland	Neuchâtel Xamax	2	1	0	1	5	3	+2
Switzerland	Sion	6	4	0	2	18	12	+6
Switzerland	St. Gallen	2	1	1	0	4	3	+1
Switzerland	Young Boys	2	0	0	2	2	4	–2
Switzerland	Zürich	3	1	1	1	4	4	0
Subtotal		18	11	2	5	44	32	+12
Ukraine	Dynamo Kyiv	1	0	1	0	3	3	0
Ukraine	Karpaty Lviv	2	0	2	0	3	3	0
Ukraine	Metalist Kharkiv	1	0	0	1	0	1	–1
Subtotal		4	0	3	1	6	7	–1
Total		344	123	90	131	476	527	–51

== Matches ==
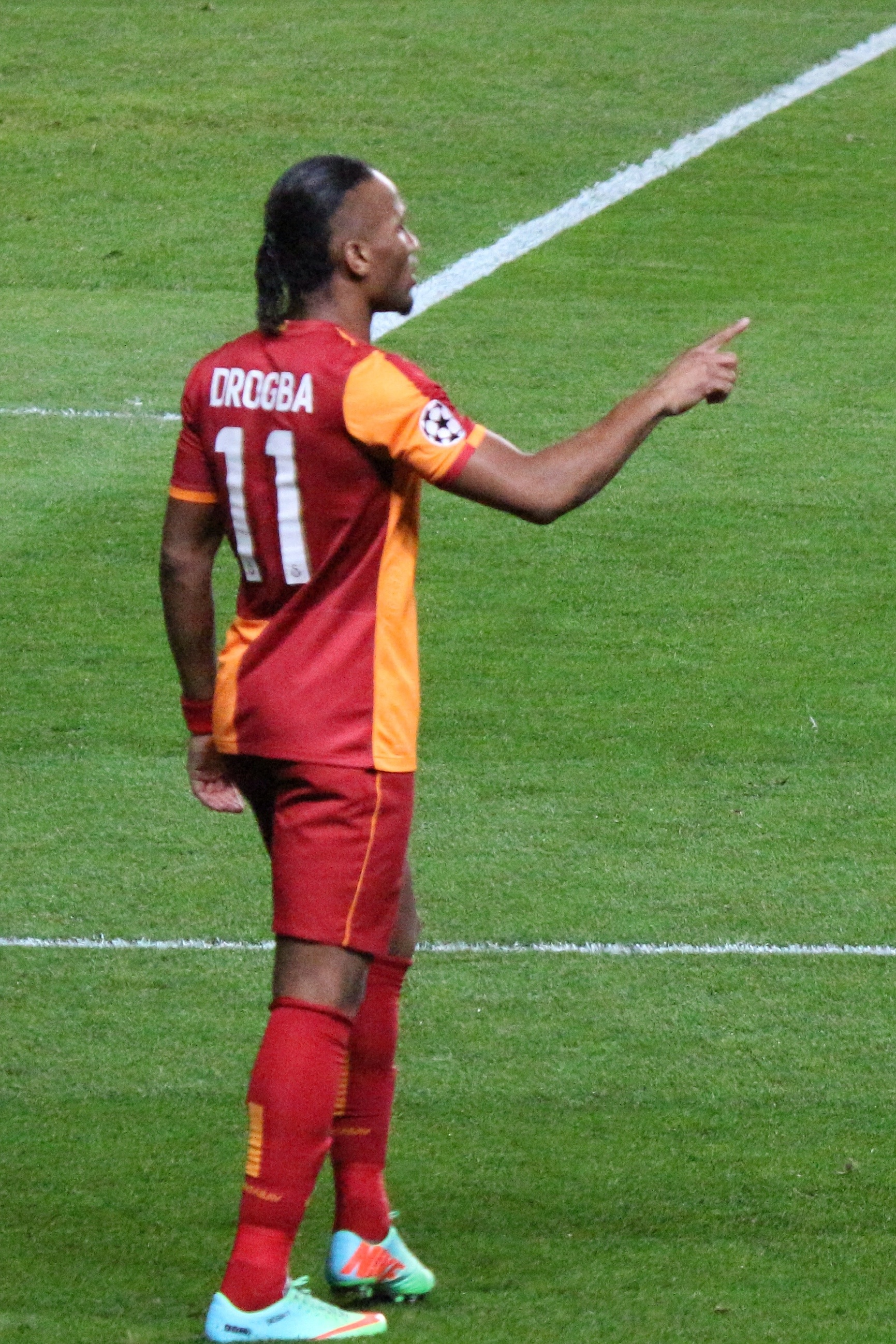
Didier Drogba playing in the UEFA Champions League last 16 against former club Chelsea in March 2014.

All results (home, away and neutral) list Galatasaray's goal tally first.

Colour key

Wins
Draws
Losses
Competition/Cup winners
Competition/Cup runners-up

Key

- a.e.t. = After extra time
- g.g. = Golden goal
- p = Penalty shoot-out
- N = Neutral venue
- a = Away goals rule
- c/t = Coin flipping
- po = Playoffs

Season	Competition	Round	Country	Opponent	Home	Away	Aggregate / Group / League position	Reference
1956–57	European Cup	Preliminary round	Romania	Dinamo București	2–1	1–3	3–4	
1962–63	European Cup	Preliminary round	Romania	Dinamo București	3–0	1–1	4–1	
1962–63	European Cup	First round	Poland	Polonia Bytom	4–1	0–1	4–2	
1962–63	European Cup	Quarter-finals	Italy	Milan	1–3	0–5	1–8	
1963–64	European Cup	Preliminary round	Hungary	Ferencváros	4–0	0–2	4–2	
1963–64	European Cup	First round	Switzerland	Zürich	2–0	0–2	4–4 (po 2–2 a.e.t.) (c/t)	
1964–65	European Cup Winners' Cup	First round	East Germany	1. FC Magdeburg	1–1	1–1	3–3 (po 1–1) (c/t)	
1964–65	European Cup Winners' Cup	Second round	Poland	Legia Warsaw	1–0	1–2	2–3 (po 0–1)	
1965–66	European Cup Winners' Cup	First round	Switzerland	Sion	2–1	1–5	3–6	
1966–67	European Cup Winners' Cup	First round	Austria	Rapid Wien	3–5	0–4	3–9	
1969–70	European Cup	First round	Ireland	Waterford	2–0	3–2	5–2	
1969–70	European Cup	Second round	Czechoslovakia	Spartak Trnava	1–0	0–1	1–1 (c/t)	
1969–70	European Cup	Quarter-finals	Poland	Legia Warsaw	1–1	0–2	1–3	
1971–72	European Cup	First round	Soviet Union	CSKA Moscow	1–1	0–3	1–4	
1972–73	European Cup	First round	West Germany	Bayern Munich	1–1	0–6	1–7	
1973–74	European Cup	First round	Spain	Atlético Madrid	0–1	0–0	0–1	
1975–76	UEFA Cup	First round	Austria	Rapid Wien	3–1	0–1	3–2	
1975–76	UEFA Cup	Second round	Soviet Union	Torpedo Moscow	2–4	0–3	2–7	
1976–77	European Cup Winners' Cup	First round	Sweden	AIK	1–1	2–1	3–2	
1976–77	European Cup Winners' Cup	Second round	Belgium	Anderlecht	1–5	1–5	2–10	
1978–79	UEFA Cup	First round	England	West Bromwich Albion	1–3	1–3	2–6	
1979–80	UEFA Cup	First round	Yugoslavia	Red Star Belgrade	0–0	1–3	1–3	
1982–83	European Cup Winners' Cup	First round	Finland	Lahti	2–1	1–1	3–2	
1982–83	European Cup Winners' Cup	Second round	Austria	Austria Wien	2–4	1–0	3–4	
1985–86	European Cup Winners' Cup	First round	Poland	Widzew Łódź	1–0	1–2	2–2 (a)	
1985–86	European Cup Winners' Cup	Second round	West Germany	KFC Uerdingen 05	1–1	0–2	1–3	
1986–87	UEFA Cup	First round	Romania	U Craiova	2–1	0–2	2–3	
1987–88	European Cup	First round	Netherlands	PSV Eindhoven	2–0	0–3	2–3	
1988–89	European Cup	First round	Austria	Rapid Wien	2–0	1–2	3–2	
1988–89	European Cup	Second round	Switzerland	Neuchâtel Xamax	5–0	0–3	5–3	
1988–89	European Cup	Quarter-finals	France	Monaco	1–1	1–0	2–1	
1988–89	European Cup	Semi-finals	Romania	Steaua București	1–1	0–4	1–5	
1989–90	UEFA Cup	First round	Yugoslavia	Red Star Belgrade	1–1	0–2	1–3	
1991–92	European Cup Winners' Cup	First round	Germany	Stahl Eisenhüttenstadt	3–0	2–1	5–1	
1991–92	European Cup Winners' Cup	Second round	Czechoslovakia	Baník Ostrava	0–1	2–1	2–2	
1991–92	European Cup Winners' Cup	Quarter-finals	Germany	Werder Bremen	0–0	1–2	1–2	
1992–93	UEFA Cup	First round	Poland	GKS Katowice	2–1	0–0	2–1	
1992–93	UEFA Cup	Second round	Germany	Eintracht Frankfurt	1–0	0–0	1–0	
1992–93	UEFA Cup	Third round	Italy	Roma	3–2	1–3	4–5	
1993–94	UEFA Champions League	First round	Ireland	Cork City	2–1	1–0	3–1	
1993–94	UEFA Champions League	Second round	England	Manchester United	0–0	3–3	3–3 (a)	
1993–94	UEFA Champions League	Group A	Spain	Barcelona	0–0	0–3	4th	
1993–94	UEFA Champions League	Group A	Russia	Spartak Moscow	1–2	0–0	4th	
1993–94	UEFA Champions League	Group A	France	Monaco	0–2	0–3	4th	
1994–95	UEFA Champions League	Qualifying round	Luxembourg	Avenir Beggen	4–0	5–1	9–1	
1994–95	UEFA Champions League	Group A	Spain	Barcelona	2–1	1–2	4th	
1994–95	UEFA Champions League	Group A	England	Manchester United	0–0	0–4	4th	
1994–95	UEFA Champions League	Group A	Sweden	IFK Göteborg	0–1	0–1	4th	
1995–96	UEFA Cup	Preliminary round	Czech Republic	Sparta Prague	1–1	1–3	2–4	
1996–97	UEFA Cup Winners' Cup	First round	Moldova	Tiraspol	4–0	1–0	5–0	
1996–97	UEFA Cup Winners' Cup	Second round	France	Paris Saint-Germain	4–2	0–4	4–6	
1997–98	UEFA Champions League	Second qualifying round	Switzerland	Sion	4–1	4–1	8–2	
1997–98	UEFA Champions League	Group A	Germany	Borussia Dortmund	0–1	1–4	4th	
1997–98	UEFA Champions League	Group A	Italy	Parma	1–1	0–2	4th	
1997–98	UEFA Champions League	Group A	Czech Republic	Sparta Prague	2–0	0–3	4th	
1998–99	UEFA Champions League	Second qualifying round	Switzerland	Grasshopper Club Zürich	2–1	3–2	5–3	
1998–99	UEFA Champions League	Group B	Italy	Juventus	1–1	2–2	2nd	
1998–99	UEFA Champions League	Group B	Spain	Athletic Bilbao	2–1	0–1	2nd	
1998–99	UEFA Champions League	Group B	Norway	Rosenborg	3–0	0–3	2nd	
1999–2000	UEFA Champions League	Third qualifying round	Austria	Rapid Wien	1–0	3–0	4–0	
1999–2000	UEFA Champions League	Group H	Germany	Hertha BSC	2–2	4–1	3rd	
1999–2000	UEFA Champions League	Group H	Italy	Milan	3–2	1–2	3rd	
1999–2000	UEFA Champions League	Group H	England	Chelsea	0–5	0–1	3rd	
1999–2000	UEFA Cup	Third round	Italy	Bologna	2–1	1–1	3–2	
1999–2000	UEFA Cup	Fourth round	Germany	Borussia Dortmund	0–0	2–0	2–0	
1999–2000	UEFA Cup	Quarter-finals	Spain	Mallorca	2–1	4–1	6–2	
1999–2000	UEFA Cup	Semi-finals	England	Leeds United	2–0	2–2	4–2	
1999–2000	UEFA Cup	Final	England	Arsenal	0–0 (a.e.t.), 4–1 (p) (N)			
2000	UEFA Super Cup	Final	Spain	Real Madrid	2–1 (g.g. in a.e.t.) (N)			
2000–01	UEFA Champions League	Third qualifying round	Switzerland	St. Gallen	2–2	2–1	4–3	
2000–01	UEFA Champions League	Group D	France	Monaco	3–2	2–4	2nd	
2000–01	UEFA Champions League	Group D	Austria	Sturm Graz	2–2	0–3	2nd	
2000–01	UEFA Champions League	Group D	Scotland	Rangers	3–2	0–0	2nd	
2000–01	UEFA Champions League	Group B	Italy	Milan	2–0	2–2	2nd	
2000–01	UEFA Champions League	Group B	France	Paris Saint-Germain	1–0	0–2	2nd	
2000–01	UEFA Champions League	Group B	Spain	Deportivo La Coruña	1–0	0–2	2nd	
2000–01	UEFA Champions League	Quarter-finals	Spain	Real Madrid	3–2	0–3	3–5	
2001–02	UEFA Champions League	Second qualifying round	Albania	KS Vllaznia	2–0	4–1	6–1	
2001–02	UEFA Champions League	Third qualifying round	Bulgaria	Levski Sofia	2–1	1–1	3–2	
2001–02	UEFA Champions League	Group D	Italy	Lazio	1–0	0–1	2nd	
2001–02	UEFA Champions League	Group D	Netherlands	PSV Eindhoven	2–0	1–3	2nd	
2001–02	UEFA Champions League	Group D	France	Nantes	0–0	1–0	2nd	
2001–02	UEFA Champions League	Group B	Italy	Roma	1–1	1–1	4th	
2001–02	UEFA Champions League	Group B	Spain	Barcelona	0–1	2–2	4th	
2001–02	UEFA Champions League	Group B	England	Liverpool	1–1	0–0	4th	
2002–03	UEFA Champions League	Group H	Russia	Lokomotiv Moscow	1–2	2–0	4th	
2002–03	UEFA Champions League	Group H	Spain	Barcelona	0–2	1–3	4th	
2002–03	UEFA Champions League	Group H	Belgium	Club Brugge	0–0	1–3	4th	
2003–04	UEFA Champions League	Third qualifying round	Bulgaria	CSKA Sofia	3–0	3–0	6–0	
2003–04	UEFA Champions League	Group D	Italy	Juventus	2–0	1–2	3rd	
2003–04	UEFA Champions League	Group D	Spain	Real Sociedad	1–2	1–1	3rd	
2003–04	UEFA Champions League	Group D	Greece	Olympiacos	1–0	0–3	3rd	
2003–04	UEFA Cup	Third round	Spain	Villarreal	2–2	0–3	2–5	
2005–06	UEFA Cup	First round	Norway	Tromsø	1–1	0–1	1–2	
2006–07	UEFA Champions League	Third qualifying round	Czech Republic	Mladá Boleslav	5–2	1–1	6–3	
2006–07	UEFA Champions League	Group C	France	Girondins de Bordeaux	0–0	1–3	4th	
2006–07	UEFA Champions League	Group C	England	Liverpool	3–2	2–3	4th	
2006–07	UEFA Champions League	Group C	Netherlands	PSV Eindhoven	1–2	0–2	4th	
2007–08	UEFA Cup	Second qualifying round	Croatia	Slaven Koprivnica	2–1	2–1	4–2	
2007–08	UEFA Cup	First round	Switzerland	Sion	5–1	2–3	7–4	
2007–08	UEFA Cup	Group H	France	Girondins de Bordeaux	N/A	1–2	3rd	
2007–08	UEFA Cup	Group H	Sweden	Helsingborgs IF	2–3	N/A	3rd	
2007–08	UEFA Cup	Group H	Greece	Panionios	N/A	3–0	3rd	
2007–08	UEFA Cup	Group H	Austria	Austria Wien	0–0	N/A	3rd	
2007–08	UEFA Cup	Round of 32	Germany	Bayer Leverkusen	0–0	1–5	1–5	
2008–09	UEFA Champions League	Third qualifying round	Romania	Steaua București	2–2	0–1	2–3	
2008–09	UEFA Cup	First round	Switzerland	Bellinzona	2–1	4–3	6–4	
2008–09	UEFA Cup	Group B	Greece	Olympiacos	1–0	N/A	2nd	
2008–09	UEFA Cup	Group B	Portugal	Benfica	N/A	2–0	2nd	
2008–09	UEFA Cup	Group B	Ukraine	Metalist Kharkiv	0–1	N/A	2nd	
2008–09	UEFA Cup	Group B	Germany	Hertha BSC	N/A	1–0	2nd	
2008–09	UEFA Cup	Round of 32	France	Girondins de Bordeaux	4–3	0–0	4–3	
2008–09	UEFA Cup	Round of 16	Germany	Hamburger SV	2–3	1–1	3–4	
2009–10	UEFA Europa League	Second qualifying round	Kazakhstan	Tobol	2–0	1–1	3–1	
2009–10	UEFA Europa League	Third qualifying round	Israel	Maccabi Netanya	6–0	4–1	10–1	
2009–10	UEFA Europa League	Play-off round	Estonia	Levadia Tallinn	5–0	1–1	6–1	
2009–10	UEFA Europa League	Group F	Greece	Panathinaikos	1–0	3–1	1st	
2009–10	UEFA Europa League	Group F	Austria	Sturm Graz	1–1	0–1	1st	
2009–10	UEFA Europa League	Group F	Romania	Dinamo București	4–1	3–0	1st	
2009–10	UEFA Europa League	Round of 32	Spain	Atlético Madrid	1–2	1–1	2–3	
2010–11	UEFA Europa League	Third qualifying round	Serbia	OFK Beograd	2–2	5–1	7–3	
2010–11	UEFA Europa League	Play-off round	Ukraine	Karpaty Lviv	2–2	1–1	3–3 (a)	
2012–13	UEFA Champions League	Group H	England	Manchester United	1–0	0–1	2nd	
2012–13	UEFA Champions League	Group H	Portugal	Braga	0–2	2–1	2nd	
2012–13	UEFA Champions League	Group H	Romania	CFR Cluj	1–1	3–1	2nd	
2012–13	UEFA Champions League	Round of 16	Germany	Schalke 04	1–1	3–2	4–3	
2012–13	UEFA Champions League	Quarter-finals	Spain	Real Madrid	3–2	0–3	3–5	
2013–14	UEFA Champions League	Group B	Spain	Real Madrid	1–6	1–4	2nd	
2013–14	UEFA Champions League	Group B	Italy	Juventus	1–0	2–2	2nd	
2013–14	UEFA Champions League	Group B	Denmark	Copenhagen	3–1	0–1	2nd	
2013–14	UEFA Champions League	Round of 16	England	Chelsea	1–1	0–2	1–3	
2014–15	UEFA Champions League	Group D	England	Arsenal	1–4	1–4	4th	
2014–15	UEFA Champions League	Group D	Germany	Borussia Dortmund	0–4	1–4	4th	
2014–15	UEFA Champions League	Group D	Belgium	Anderlecht	1–1	0–2	4th	
2015–16	UEFA Champions League	Group C	Spain	Atlético Madrid	0–2	0–2	3rd	
2015–16	UEFA Champions League	Group C	Kazakhstan	Astana	1–1	2–2	3rd	
2015–16	UEFA Champions League	Group C	Portugal	Benfica	2–1	1–2	3rd	
2015–16	UEFA Europa League	Round of 32	Italy	Lazio	1–1	1–3	2–4	
2017–18	UEFA Europa League	Second qualifying round	Sweden	Östersund	1–1	0–2	1–3	
2018–19	UEFA Champions League	Group D	Russia	Lokomotiv Moscow	3–0	0–2	3rd	
2018–19	UEFA Champions League	Group D	Germany	Schalke 04	0–0	0–2	3rd	
2018–19	UEFA Champions League	Group D	Portugal	Porto	2–3	0–1	3rd	
2018–19	UEFA Europa League	Round of 32	Portugal	Benfica	1–2	0–0	1–2	
2019–20	UEFA Champions League	Group A	France	Paris Saint-Germain	0–1	0–5	4th	
2019–20	UEFA Champions League	Group A	Spain	Real Madrid	0–1	0–6	4th	
2019–20	UEFA Champions League	Group A	Belgium	Club Brugge	1–1	0–0	4th	
2020–21	UEFA Europa League	Second qualifying round	Azerbaijan	Neftçi	N/A	3–1	N/A	
2020–21	UEFA Europa League	Third qualifying round	Croatia	Hajduk Split	2–0	N/A	N/A	
2020–21	UEFA Europa League	Play-off round	Scotland	Rangers	N/A	1–2	N/A	
2021–22	UEFA Champions League	Second qualifying round	Netherlands	PSV Eindhoven	1–2	1–5	2–7	
2021–22	UEFA Europa League	Third qualifying round	Scotland	St Johnstone	1–1	4–2	5–3	
2021–22	UEFA Europa League	Play-off round	Denmark	Randers	2–1	1–1	3–2	
2021–22	UEFA Europa League	Group E	Italy	Lazio	1–0	0–0	1st	
2021–22	UEFA Europa League	Group E	France	Marseille	4–2	0–0	1st	
2021–22	UEFA Europa League	Group E	Russia	Lokomotiv Moscow	1–1	1–0	1st	
2021–22	UEFA Europa League	Round of 16	Spain	Barcelona	1–2	0–0	1–2	
2023–24	UEFA Champions League	Second qualifying round	Lithuania	Žalgiris	1–0	2–2	3−2	
2023–24	UEFA Champions League	Third qualifying round	Slovenia	Olimpija Ljubljana	1–0	3–0	4−0	
2023–24	UEFA Champions League	Play-off round	Norway	Molde	2−1	3–2	5−3	
2023–24	UEFA Champions League	Group A	Denmark	Copenhagen	2–2	0–1	3rd	
2023–24	UEFA Champions League	Group A	England	Manchester United	3–3	3–2	3rd	
2023–24	UEFA Champions League	Group A	Germany	Bayern Munich	1–3	1–2	3rd	
2023–24	UEFA Europa League	Knockout round play-offs	Czech Republic	Sparta Prague	3–2	1–4	4–6	
2024–25	UEFA Champions League	Play-off round	Switzerland	Young Boys	0–1	2–3	2–4	
2024–25	UEFA Europa League	League phase	Greece	PAOK	3–1	N/A	14th	
2024–25	UEFA Europa League	League phase	Latvia	RFS	N/A	2–2	14th	
2024–25	UEFA Europa League	League phase	Sweden	IF Elfsborg	4–3	N/A	14th	
2024–25	UEFA Europa League	League phase	England	Tottenham Hotspur	3–2	N/A	14th	
2024–25	UEFA Europa League	League phase	Netherlands	AZ	N/A	1–1	14th	
2024–25	UEFA Europa League	League phase	Sweden	Malmö FF	N/A	2–2	14th	
2024–25	UEFA Europa League	League phase	Ukraine	Dynamo Kyiv	3–3	N/A	14th	
2024–25	UEFA Europa League	League phase	Netherlands	Ajax	N/A	1–2	14th	
2024–25	UEFA Europa League	Knockout phase play-offs	Netherlands	AZ	2–2	1–4	3–6	
2025–26	UEFA Champions League	League phase	Germany	Eintracht Frankfurt	N/A	1–5	20th	
2025–26	UEFA Champions League	League phase	England	Liverpool	1–0	N/A	20th	
2025–26	UEFA Champions League	League phase	Norway	Bodø/Glimt	3–1	N/A	20th	
2025–26	UEFA Champions League	League phase	Netherlands	Ajax	N/A	3–0	20th	
2025–26	UEFA Champions League	League phase	Belgium	Union Saint-Gilloise	0–1	N/A	20th	
2025–26	UEFA Champions League	League phase	France	Monaco	N/A	0–1	20th	
2025–26	UEFA Champions League	League phase	Spain	Atlético Madrid	1–1	N/A	20th	
2025–26	UEFA Champions League	League phase	England	Manchester City	N/A	0–2	20th	
2025–26	UEFA Champions League	Knockout phase play-offs	Italy	Juventus	5–2	2–3 (a.e.t.)	7–5	
2025–26	UEFA Champions League	Round of 16	England	Liverpool	1–0	0–4	1–4	
2026–27	UEFA Champions League	League phase	Portugal	Sporting CP	N/A	1–3		
2026–27	UEFA Champions League	League phase	Spain	Barcelona	1–4	N/A		
2026–27	UEFA Champions League	League phase	France	Lille	N/A	4–2		
2026–27	UEFA Champions League	League phase	Germany	VfB Stuttgart	2–0	N/A		
2026–27	UEFA Champions League	League phase	England	Aston Villa		N/A		
2026–27	UEFA Champions League	League phase	Greece	AEK Athens	N/A			
2026–27	UEFA Champions League	League phase	Netherlands	Feyenoord		N/A		
2026–27	UEFA Champions League	League phase	France	Paris Saint-Germain	N/A			

== Player statistics ==
As of 5 November 2026

Players in bold are still active with Galatasaray

=== Most appearances ===
Rank	Player	Years	UCL	UEL	UCWC	USC	Total	Ref.
1	(Turkey) Bülent Korkmaz	1985–2005	74	17	9	1	101	
2	(Turkey) Arif Erdem	1991–2000; 2001–2005	67	10	10	0	87	
3	(Turkey) Hakan Şükür	1992–1995; 1995–2000; 2003–2008	53	27	4	0	84	
4	(Turkey) Hasan Şaş	1998–2009	59	23	0	1	83	
5	(Turkey) Ergün Penbe	1994–2007	65	11	3	0	79	
6	(Uruguay) Fernando Muslera	2011–2025	55	23	0	0	78	
7	(Turkey) Suat Kaya	1986–1987; 1992–2003	52	11	1	1	65	
8	(Turkey) Hakan Ünsal	1994–2002; 2002–2005	49	7	4	1	61	
9	(Turkey) Okan Buruk	1991–2001; 2006–2008	38	16	3	1	58	
10	(Turkey) Sabri Sarıoğlu	2003–2017	26	31	0	0	57	
11	(Turkey) Ümit Davala	1996–2001; 2002–2003	43	6	4	1	54	
12	(Turkey) Tugay Kerimoğlu	1987–2000	35	10	8	0	53	
13	(Romania) Gheorghe Popescu	1997–2001	41	6	0	1	48	
14	(Turkey) Arda Turan	2004–2011; 2020–2022	11	36	0	0	47	
15	(Turkey) **Barış Alper Yılmaz**	2021–	29	15	0	0	44	
16	(Romania) Gheorghe Hagi	1996–2001	31	8	3	1	43	
17	(Turkey) Ayhan Akman	2001–2012	21	21	0	0	42	
18	(Colombia) Faryd Mondragón	2001–2007	37	4	0	0	41	
19	(Turkey) Ümit Karan	2001–2005; 2005–2009	25	15	0	0	40	
20	(Turkey) **Abdülkerim Bardakcı**	2022–	26	12	0	0	38	
21	(Turkey) Selçuk İnan	2011–2020	34	4	0	0	38	
22	(Brazil) Cláudio Taffarel	1998–2001	28	9	0	1	38	
23	(Uruguay) **Lucas Torreira**	2022–	26	11	0	0	37	
24	(Turkey) Hakan Balta	2007–2018	14	22	0	0	36	

== UEFA club ranking ==
As of end of 2025–26 season.

=== Five-year ranking ===
Rank	Club	Points
47	(Denmark) FC København	54.375
48	(France) Olympique Marseille	54.000
49	(Turkey) Galatasaray	53.500
50	(Hungary) Ferencváros	51.250
51	(Romania) Viktoria Plzen	50.500

==== Five-year ranking history ====
Season	Rank	Points	Ref.
1963	72 ▲	1.000	
1964	39 ▲	2.000	
1965	32 ▲	3.000	
1966	24 ▲	4.000	
1967	29 ▼	4.000	
1968	53 ▼	3.000	
1969	87 ▼	2.000	
1970	82 ▲	2.333	
1971	131 ▼	1.333	
1972	102 ▲	1.833	
1973	77 ▲	2.333	
1974	65 ▲	2.833	
1975	112 ▼	1.500	
1976	86 ▲	2.000	
1977	80 ▲	2.250	
1978	106 ▼	1.750	
1979	141 ▼	1.250	
1980	114 ▲	1.750	
1981	145 ▼	1.250	
1982	202 ▼	0.500	
1983	110 ▲	1.750	
1984	109 ▲	1.750	
1985	135 ▼	1.250	
1986	97 ▲	2.000	
1987	61 ▲	3.000	
1988	70 ▼	2.750	
1989	38 ▲	4.000	
1990	32 ▲	4.500	
1991	46 ▼	3.750	
1992	37 ▲	4.083	

Season	Rank	Points	Ref.
1993	33 ▲	4.416	
1994	34 ▼	4.166	
1995	37 ▼	4.332	
1996	36 ▲	4.332	
1997	29 ▲	4.499	
1998	40 ▼	3.832	
1999	68 ▼	31.175	
2000	33 ▲	51.925	
2001	16 ▲	71.987	
2002	15 ▲	78.362	
2003	18 ▼	78.495	
2004	15 ▲	74.656	
2005	35 ▼	50.872	
2006	71 ▼	33.634	
2007	97 ▼	26.791	
2008	87 ▲	30.469	
2009	60 ▲	33.445	
2010	43 ▲	43.890	
2011	45 ▼	44.510	
2012	60 ▼	38.310	
2013	41 ▲	54.400	
2014	36 ▲	55.340	
2015	38 ▼	50.020	
2016	32 ▲	57.920	
2017	31 ▲	58.840	
2018	49 ▼	29.500	
2019	68 ▼	22.500	
2020	64 ▲	23.500	
2021	94 ▼	17.000	
2022	54 ▲	32.000	

Season	Rank	Points	Ref.
2023	55 ▼	31.500	
2024	60 ▼	31.500	
2025	58 ▲	38.250	
2026	49 ▲	53.500	

== Honours ==
- UEFA Cup / UEFA Europa League

Winners (1): 1999–2000

- UEFA Super Cup

Winners (1): 2000

== See also ==
- List of Galatasaray S.K. records and statistics
- Turkish football clubs in European competitions
