= 2000 UEFA Cup final =

- The match programme cover
- Event: 1999–2000 UEFA Cup
Galatasaray	Arsenal
(Turkey)	(England)
0	0
- After golden goal extra time Galatasaray won 4–1 on penalties
- Date: 17 May 2000
- Venue: Parken Stadium, Copenhagen
- Man of the Match: Cláudio Taffarel (Galatasaray)
- Referee: Antonio López Nieto (Spain)
- Attendance: 38,919
- Weather: Light rain 13 °C (55 °F); 94% humidity

The 2000 UEFA Cup final was a football match that took place on 17 May 2000 at Parken Stadium in Copenhagen, Denmark to decide the winner of the 1999–2000 UEFA Cup. The game event pitted Galatasaray of Turkey and Arsenal of England, and was the final match of the 1999–2000 season, the 29th final of Europe's second largest club football competition, the UEFA Cup. It was Galatasaray's first appearance in a final of a European tournament and Arsenal's first UEFA Cup final.

Both clubs competed in the 1999–2000 UEFA Champions League first group stage, with each team finishing in third place; Galatasaray behind Chelsea and Hertha BSC and Arsenal behind Barcelona and Fiorentina, thus exiting the competition, and qualifying for the third round of the UEFA Cup. From there, the two sides advanced through the fourth round, the quarter-finals and the semi-finals to progress to the final. Galatasaray overcame Bologna, Borussia Dortmund, Mallorca and Leeds United on their way, while Arsenal defeated Nantes, Deportivo La Coruña, Werder Bremen and Lens.

The match was attended by 38,919 spectators, as Galatasaray won 4–1 on penalties following extra time, making it the first time for a Turkish side to win a European honour. They also obtained a Treble, having also won the Turkish league championship and the Turkish domestic cup titles. As a result of their triumph, Galatasaray became the first UEFA Cup winner to compete for the UEFA Super Cup, following the dissolution of the UEFA Cup Winners' Cup, and also initially qualified for the later-cancelled 2001 FIFA Club World Championship. The final was marred by the riots between supporters of the two sides.

== Route to the final ==
(Turkey) Galatasaray				Round	(England) Arsenal			
UEFA Champions League
Opponent	Agg.	1st leg	2nd leg	Qualifying rounds	Opponent	Agg.	1st leg	2nd leg
(Austria) Rapid Wien	4–0	3–0 (A)	1–0 (H)	Third qualifying round	Bye			
Opponent	Result			First group stage	Opponent	Result		
(Germany) Hertha BSC	2–2 (H)			Matchday 1	(Italy) Fiorentina	0–0 (A)		
(Italy) Milan	1–2 (A)			Matchday 2	(Sweden) AIK	3–1 (H)		
(England) Chelsea	0–1 (A)			Matchday 3	(Spain) Barcelona	1–1 (A)		
(England) Chelsea	0–5 (H)			Matchday 4	(Spain) Barcelona	2–4 (H)		
(Germany) Hertha BSC	4–1 (A)			Matchday 5	(Italy) Fiorentina	0–1 (H)		
(Italy) Milan	3–2 (H)			Matchday 6	(Sweden) AIK	3–2 (A)		
Group H third place: Pos / Team / Pld / Pts; 1 / (England) Chelsea / 6 / 11; 2 / (Germany) Hertha BSC / 6 / 8; 3 / (Turkey) Galatasaray / 6 / 7; 4 / (Italy) Milan / 6 / 6; Source: UEFA				Final standings	Group B third place: Pos / Team / Pld / Pts; 1 / (Spain) Barcelona / 6 / 14; 2 / (Italy) Fiorentina / 6 / 9; 3 / (England) Arsenal / 6 / 8; 4 / (Sweden) AIK / 6 / 1; Source: UEFA			
UEFA Cup
Opponent	Agg.	1st leg	2nd leg		Opponent	Agg.	1st leg	2nd leg
(Italy) Bologna	3–2	1–1 (A)	2–1 (H)	Third round	(France) Nantes	6–3	3–0 (H)	3–3 (A)
(Germany) Borussia Dortmund	2–0	2–0 (A)	0–0 (H)	Fourth round	(Spain) Deportivo La Coruña	6–3	5–1 (H)	1–2 (A)
(Spain) Mallorca	6–2	4–1 (A)	2–1 (H)	Quarter-finals	(Germany) Werder Bremen	6–2	2–0 (H)	4–2 (A)
(England) Leeds United	4–2	2–0 (H)	2–2 (A)	Semi-finals	(France) Lens	3–1	1–0 (H)	2–1 (A)

=== Galatasaray ===
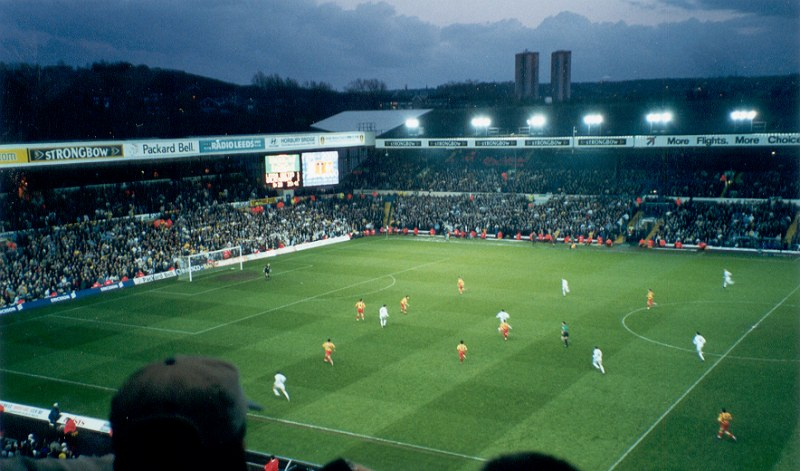
Galatasaray playing Leeds United during the second leg match at Elland Road

Galatasaray were required to qualify for the group stage, as Turkey's country coefficient only held qualifying places. The Turks entered the third qualifying round of the 1999–2000 UEFA Champions League, the final qualifying game of the competition, where they competed against Rapid Wien in two matches. Galatasaray won the first leg 3–0 at the Ernst-Happel-Stadion, and earned their spot in the first group stage following a 1–0 win at their home arena, Ali Sami Yen Stadium in the decisive leg. Galatasaray were scheduled to take part in Group G, containing Chelsea, Hertha BSC and Milan. Six matches were played, as they recorded a total two wins, one draw and three defeats, thus descending into the third round of the UEFA Cup.

Galatasaray faced Bologna in the competition's third round. The first game was played at Stadio Renato Dall'Ara, which ended in a 1–1 draw; the Italian side took the lead after a Giuseppe Signori goal during the second half, before Hakan Şükür levelled the score, with eight minutes remaining. At home, the Turkish side scored twice during the first half, and conceded once, as they won the match 2–1, and the overall leg 3–2. Galatasaray were pitted against Borussia Dortmund in the fourth round. Gala won 2–0 away at Westfalenstadion, while a scoreless draw in the homecoming match was enough for Galatasaray to see them through.

In the quarter-finals, Galatasaray's opponents were Mallorca. They won the first match 4–1, which was played at Son Moix. They booked their place in the next round by clinching a 2–1 home victory in the return leg, winning 6–2 on aggregate. Galatasaray were up against Leeds United in the semi-finals. The Istanbul side began their first game on home soil with a 2–0 win, following goals by Şükür and Capone. At Elland Road, their second match ended in a 2–2 stalemate, with Gheorghe Hagi and Şükür netting, thus winning the tie 4–2 and proceeding to the final.

=== Arsenal ===
Arsenal qualified automatically into the Champions League group stage because of England's country coefficient. They were drawn in Group B, along with AIK, Barcelona and Fiorentina. Each club played six matches, with Arsenal registering two victories, two draws and two defeats. This meant they finished in third place, one point behind second place holders Fiorentina, and hence entered the third round stage of the UEFA Cup.

Arsenal competed against Nantes in the third round of the contest. At their home venue, Arsenal Stadium, they defeated the French club 3–0, before recording a 3–3 draw at the Stade de la Beaujoire, ensuring the Gunners a 6–3 aggregate victory. They battled Deportivo La Coruña in the fourth round. Arsenal played at their home ground in the first match, and comprehensively beat the Spanish outfit by five goals to one, before suffering a 2–1 loss at Estadio Municipal de Riazor, which was still enough to take the English side to the next round on aggregate.

Werder Bremen were next up in the quarter-finals. Goals apiece by Thierry Henry and Freddie Ljungberg helped them to a 2–0 victory at home. Arsenal sealed their place in the semi-finals in the second leg played at the Weserstadion, a match which they won 4–2 after Ray Parlour's hat-trick and a lone Henry goal to register a 6–2 aggregate win. In the semi-finals, Arsenal collided with Lens. The first leg took place at home, and the Gunners won by one goal to nil, through an early goal scored by Dennis Bergkamp. They advanced at Stade Félix-Bollaert with a 2–1 victory, overall winning 3–1 to reach the final.

== Pre-match ==
=== Background ===
Galatasaray and Arsenal met each other for the first time in a European football competition, though the Turkish outfit had faced English clubs formerly on eight occasions. Their first was against Manchester United, in the 1993–94 Champions League second round, which they won 3–3 on away goals in a two-legged match. Both teams were reunited in the following season of the group stage, which concluded in a goalless tie and a Galatasaray blow. Other meetings include against West Bromwich Albion in the commencing round of the 1978–79 UEFA Cup, and Chelsea in this year's Champions League campaign. Arsenal by contrast ran into Turkish opposition twice, both of them against Fenerbahçe in the 1979–80 European Cup Winners' Cup first round; the home game was won by the English side 2–0, while the away leg ended in a 0–0 draw.

Arsenal had a better European record, compared to Galatasaray going into the match; they defeated Anderlecht with a 4–3 aggregate winning result, in the final of the 1969–70 Inter-Cities Fairs Cup. The London-based club reached the Cup Winners' Cup finales three times, in 1980, where they suffered a 5–4 defeat in a penalty shoot-out to Valencia, following a 0–0 stalemate; Arsenal also reached the 1994 final, winning 1–0 over Parma, and the following edition, losing 2–1 at the hands of Zaragoza. Their 1994 success led to them qualifying for that year's European Super Cup, where they were beaten 2–0 by Milan on aggregate in two games. This was Arsenal's first UEFA Cup (sixth in total) European final. The club were considered favorites to win the match.

Galatasaray entered the final in search for a Treble. Their fourteenth and fourth successive Turkish league title was confirmed on the final matchday. The Turkish club added the domestic cup to their trophy cabinet, after Antalyaspor was defeated with a 5–3 victory in the 2000 Turkish Cup Final. The side participated in their first UEFA Cup and European competition final, while also becoming the first ever team from Turkey to make the final in a UEFA club football competition.

=== Ticketing ===
Before the final, both finalists were awarded 12,000 tickets. The Danish Football Union announced that 9,000 tickets would be offered, for sale to the public, while the remaining 3,000 were sold to other European countries. UEFA allocated another 3,000 tickets to their officials and VIP members. Problems ensued after it was revealed that Galatasaray had been charging the tickets more than the original price, in order to prevent some football hooligans from entering the ground. The Turkish club's secretary general however, denied this and insisted that the tickets were being sold at their original price and to support the stadium and the club's other sporting activities.

=== Venue ===
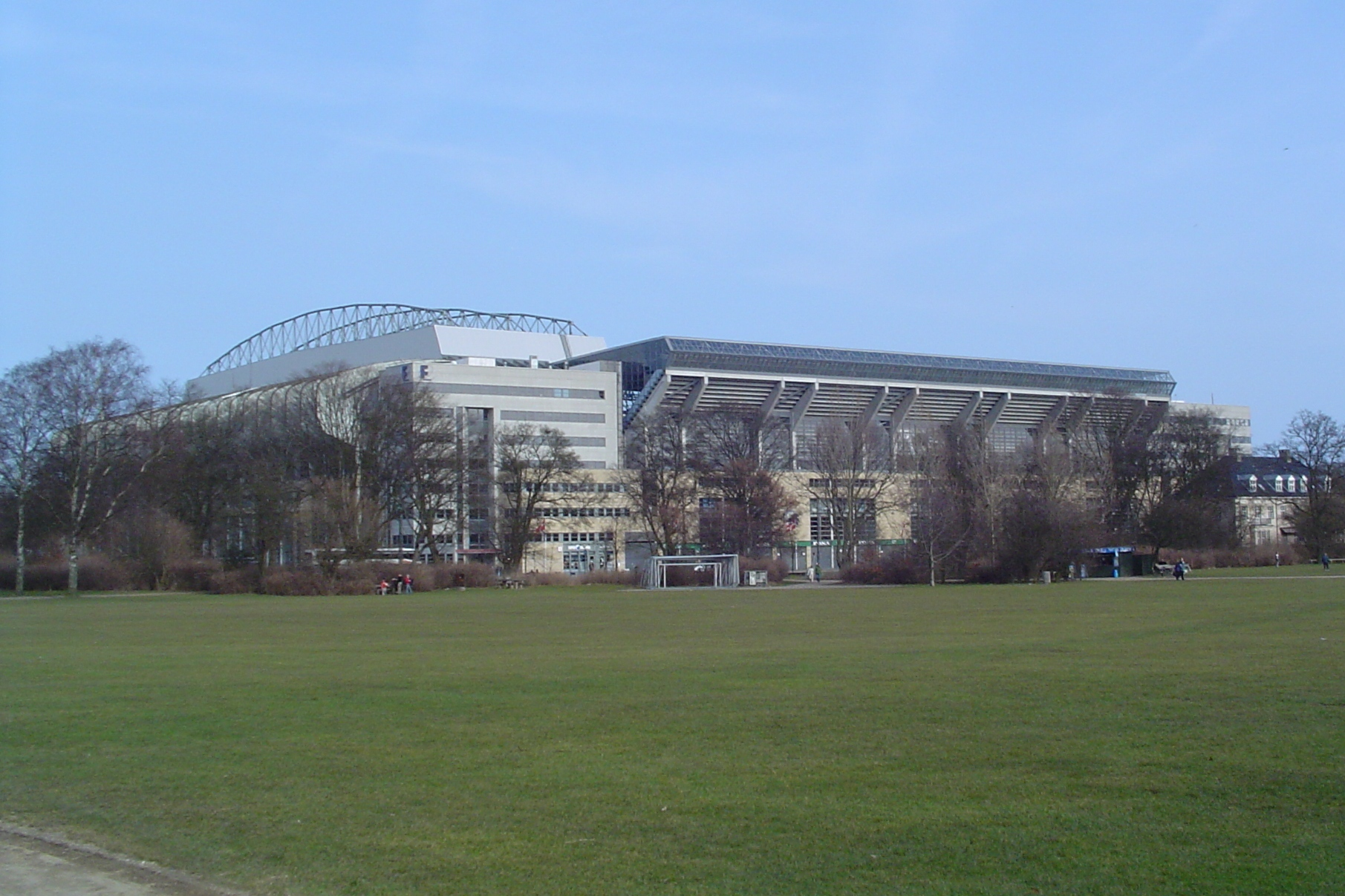
Parken Stadium, the venue of the final

Parken Stadium was selected as the venue for the final, after a decision made by the UEFA Executive Committee. It is located in the Indre Østerbro territory in Copenhagen; the site was once known as Idrætsparken, with the opening premiere held in 1911. It was the home of the Denmark national football team and Kjøbenhavns Boldklub's (KB) matches, until 1990, when the venue underwent reconstruction by the Danish lending company Baltica Finans A/S, with the former scrapped in favour of the new name, Parken Stadium. The concept was supported by the Danish Football Union with a contract that all of Denmark's national games would take place at the stadium for fifteen years. The price of the renovation was DKK640 million (£740 million). It made its debut two years later, in 1992, and has since then been the home base for F.C. Copenhagen's fixtures.

This was the second occasion that a major European final had been staged at Parken. The venue also hosted the 1994 Cup Winners' Cup Final between Arsenal and Parma.

=== Match ball ===
Adidas Terrestra Silverstream was the official match ball used in the final. It was assembled and marketed by German sport firm Adidas, and was the ninth ball in the European Championship series, as well as part of the Adidas Finale. The ball's design was created by British independent brand specialist company Design Bridge, and influenced by the waters, in the Netherlands and Belgium. The ball contains synthetic foam layers, making it more comfortable to grip and smoother to control. The Terrestra Silverstream was later unveiled as the official match ball of the UEFA Euro 2000.

=== Match officials ===
Before the final, a match official team from the Royal Spanish Football Federation was appointed, with Antonio López Nieto as the main referee of the final, his second UEFA Cup final since 1998 between Inter Milan and Lazio. Nieto obtained his international referee badge in 1993, and had previously taken charge of 30 European tournament games – 15 UEFA Champions League and 15 UEFA Cup matches. The Spaniard made his European debut in the second leg of the first-round tie between Manchester United and Kispest Honvéd in the 1993–94 UEFA Champions League. He was also present in the match referees squad during the UEFA Euro 1996 qualifiers and the main event, as well as at the 1998 FIFA World Cup qualifiers.

Nieto was joined by assistant referees Fernando Tresaco Gracia and Victoriano Giráldez Carrasco and fourth official Arturo Daudén Ibáñez.

=== Opening ceremony ===
An opening ceremony was held, prior to the match. At the start of the event, cheerleading girls dressed in pom-pom clothing stepped onto the football pitch to entertain the crowd; the routine also featured a small number of Danish–Turkish girls from a local school, performing a folk dance display containing Turkish elements. The act was succeeded by an appearance from Danish pop singer and actor Stig Rossen, who sang an alternative version of the notable song "Wonderful Copenhagen". Prince Joachim of Denmark, the youngest of Queen Margrethe II and Prince Henrik's two children, welcomed the opening ceremony by making a short speech to all the seated spectators in the stadium.

== Broadcasting ==
The final was made available on television, across 185 countries, with an estimated 500 million viewers. Danish television channel DR1 announced that they would use seventeen cameras, for the match coverage. In the United Kingdom, BBC One, the main channel of the public television corporation, the British Broadcasting Corporation acquired the rights for the final; the network broadcast the event, with live commentary provided by veteran professional sports pundit and television presenter Barry Davies, who was assisted by former English footballer Trevor Brooking. In the United Kingdom, the final came second in the overnight ratings list, with 9.1 million viewers, behind an episode of Coronation Street. The game was shown on Fox Sports World in the United States. In Turkey, the match was broadcast on the public television channel TRT 1.

== Match ==
=== Summary ===
==== First half ====
Arsenal started the match through a kick-off by Henry. Three minutes into the match, captain Tony Adams attempted to clear the ball with a header, only for it to land at the feet of Arif Erdem, who attempted a volley from outside the Arsenal area that was deflected on to the post, with Galatasaray being awarded a corner. Erdem took it, but failed to trouble the defence and the ball was easily cleared. Arsenal responded via Bergkamp, who received the ball from Marc Overmars; Bergkamp attempted to outrun Galatasaray defenders Capone and Gheorghe Popescu and into their area, but he was unable to keep the ball in play. Arsenal fashioned more chances, as Overmars won a one-on-one encounter against Capone, trying to reach Bergkamp, but the ball was easily read by Popescu and put out for a corner. The corner came to nothing, with Patrick Vieira trying to hit the ball, but an opportunity went to Henry, whose shot went over the bar. A third of the match played, Arsenal were awarded a free-kick after Okan Buruk received a yellow card for a slide tackle on Vieira.

Martin Keown took the free-kick, which Popescu unsuccessfully attempted to clear, giving Overmars a shot on goal, a volley which went over. One minute later, Galatasaray's first opportunity came when Erdem received a straight ball from a Hagi-taken free-kick and took a shot, which goalkeeper David Seaman managed to keep out with his left hand for a corner. The corner was taken, but no Galatasaray player was available to direct the ball towards the goal. Arsenal would create more opportunities, when Sylvinho snatched the ball from Hagi and ran down Galatasaray's left, before putting in a cross to the running Henry, who was halted by a clearance from Bülent Korkmaz. As Galatasaray grew more into the game, Erdem exchanged passes with Şükür, whose bicycle kick went completely off target. Arsenal began creating more chances – in the 35th minute, Overmars made a low powerful shot on goal, forcing Cláudio Taffarel to make a diving save. Overmars then made another run into the area, but his attempt went across the goal. Galatasaray nearly took the lead with only two minutes of the first half remaining, when Şükür found Erdem, who beat the offside trap. However, his shot went just wide.

==== Second half ====
Galatasaray kicked off the second half, with neither team having made any substitutions. During the third minute, Vieira picked out Parlour, but his shot hit the outside of the net. Galatasaray almost scored the opening goal, when Okan Buruk played in Hakan Şükür, whose shot hit the right post. Arsenal attempted to strike, with Sylvinho passing Hagi, and finding Henry, who in turn put in a cross for Keown, only for his shot to go over. Later, Parlour sent a long ball into the Galatasaray midfield, but no Arsenal player was there to pick up the ball. A free-kick was given to Bergkamp after a foul on Overmars, but it was cleared with a Popescu header. Galatasaray attempted an attack on the counter, with Capone giving the ball to Hagi, who lost his balance while preparing to take a shot. After receiving a pass, Hagi put in a wide cross for Şükür, but he was denied a shot on target after a clearance. Arsenal had another chance, when Henry snatched the ball from Korkmaz, and entered the penalty area, only to see his shot to go off target.

A throw-in by Hagi led to Şükür attempting to reach Erdem, who was in the penalty area, but he was tackled and play continued, which saw Arsenal attack on the counter under Parlour, whose volley went wide. Overmars then had an opportunity, after being given the ball by Henry, but the shot was off target. In the 70th minute, Korkmaz exchanged passes with Erdem, but his effort was successfully blocked by Tony Adams. Three minutes later, Parlour attempted a bending cross for Henry, but Taffarel read it easily. A well-played pass by Nwankwo Kanu ensured the ball reached Henry on the left area, who proceeded to give it to Overmars in the penalty area. Overmars's shot fell flat, but was still enough to force Taffarel to make a save. With four minutes of normal time remaining, the Turks came close to a winning goal, when Şükür collected the ball from the centre and entered Arsenal's area, but lost his footing before he could make an effort on goal, allowing Seaman to pick up the ball. Two minutes of injury time were added on, just when a free-kick was awarded to Galatasaray. Şükür took the shot, but the ball went around the wall and wide. It proved to be the final event in normal time, as the match entered extra time.

==== Extra time ====
With the match entering extra time and the golden goal rule applying, both sides had chances to score the decisive goal. In the second minute, Henry beat two defenders to enter the opponent's area, but his shot went just across the goal. Shortly after, Hagi received a straight red card, after game footage showed the player holding and striking Adams in the back; the Arsenal captain was awarded a yellow card for hitting Hagi during the altercation. As a result, Arsenal began to put the Turkish side under pressure by creating more chances through Henry, who almost won the game when he directed a header on goal from a long cross by Parlour, which Taffarel managed to keep out. Overmars's effort was then blocked by a Galatasaray defender.

Near the start of the second half in extra time, Galatasaray's first opportunity came, when Şükür attempted a shot from a Popescu cross, but the ball hit the side netting. After seven minutes, Kanu beat a defender, dribbled into the Galatasaray area and shot the ball twice, only to be denied twice by Taffarel. In the dying minutes both teams continued to create decisive chances – Galatasaray's Popescu was given a free-kick, after Şükür was brought down by Keown. However, the ball flew straight into Seaman's arms. Arsenal's Sylvinho put in a cross into the Galatasaray area to Henry, but ball was cleared away. The final whistle was blown and the match moved into a penalty shoot-out.

==== Penalty shoot-out ====
Galatasaray's Ergün Penbe stepped up to take the first spot kick and scored. He placed the ball inside the near right-hand corner, just past Seaman, who dived to his left. Davor Šuker was the first man up to take Arsenal's penalty kick. His effort proved to be unsuccessful, as the ball hit the left-hand post and bounced off the goal. Şükür became the next player to take Galatasaray's spot kick. He scored as he lobbed the ball in the right-hand corner. With Galatasaray leading 2–0, Arsenal's next penalty taker was Parlour. He placed the ball on the spot and successfully scored by burying the ball to Taffarel's right to make it 2–1. Ümit Davala calmly placed the goal, near the centre of the goal to make it 3–1 to Galatasaray. Arsenal's only hope now was Vieira, but the midfielder missed and hit the crossbar instead. Popescu then stepped up, and netted with a powerful shot, as Galatasaray won the penalty shoot-out 4–1.

=== Details ===
17 May 2000
20:45 UTC+2

Galatasaray (Turkey)	0–0 (a.e.t.)	(England) Arsenal
	Report
Penalties
Ergün (penalty scored); Şükür (penalty scored); Davala (penalty scored); Popescu (penalty scored)	4–1	(penalty missed) Šuker; (penalty scored) Parlour; (penalty missed) Vieira

Parken Stadium, Copenhagen
Attendance: 38,919
Referee: Antonio López Nieto (Spain)

Galatasaray	Arsenal

GK	1	(Brazil) Cláudio Taffarel
RB	35	(Brazil) Capone	(yellow card) 71'
CB	4	(Romania) Gheorghe Popescu	(yellow card) 63'
CB	3	(Turkey) Bülent Korkmaz (c)	(yellow card) 18'
LB	67	(Turkey) Ergün Penbe
DM	8	(Turkey) Suat Kaya		(substituted off) 95'
RM	7	(Turkey) Okan Buruk	(yellow card) 12'	(substituted off) 83'
LM	22	(Turkey) Ümit Davala
AM	10	(Romania) Gheorghe Hagi	(red card) 94'
CF	6	(Turkey) Arif Erdem	(yellow card) 48'	(substituted off) 95'
CF	9	(Turkey) Hakan Şükür
Substitutes:
GK	30	(Turkey) Kerem İnan
DF	14	(Turkey) Fatih Akyel
DF	33	(Turkey) Hakan Ünsal		(substituted on) 83'
MF	16	(Turkey) Ahmet Yıldırım		(substituted on) 95'
MF	18	(Turkey) Mehmet Yozgatlı
FW	23	(Turkey) Hasan Şaş	(yellow card) 119'	(substituted on) 95'
FW	36	(Brazil) Márcio Mixirica
Manager:
(Turkey) Fatih Terim

GK	1	(England) David Seaman
RB	2	(England) Lee Dixon
CB	6	(England) Tony Adams (c)	(yellow card) 94'
CB	5	(England) Martin Keown	(yellow card) 40'
LB	16	(Brazil) Sylvinho
RM	15	(England) Ray Parlour
CM	17	(France) Emmanuel Petit
CM	4	(France) Patrick Vieira	(yellow card) 23'
LM	11	(Netherlands) Marc Overmars		(substituted off) 115'
CF	10	(Netherlands) Dennis Bergkamp		(substituted off) 75'
CF	14	(France) Thierry Henry
Substitutes:
GK	24	(England) John Lukic
DF	3	(England) Nigel Winterburn
DF	19	(Germany) Stefan Malz
DF	22	(Ukraine) Oleh Luzhnyi
MF	18	(France) Gilles Grimandi
FW	9	(Croatia) Davor Šuker		(substituted on) 115'
FW	25	(Nigeria) Nwankwo Kanu		(substituted on) 75'
Manager:
(France) Arsène Wenger

Man of the Match:
Cláudio Taffarel (Galatasaray)

Assistant referees:
Fernando Tresaco Gracia (Spain)
Victoriano Giráldez Carrasco (Spain)
Fourth official:
Arturo Daudén Ibáñez (Spain)

Match rules

- 90 minutes
- 30 minutes of golden goal extra time if necessary
- Penalty shoot-out if scores still level
- Seven named substitutes
- Maximum of three substitutions

=== Statistics ===
Overall	Galatasaray	Arsenal
Goals scored	0	0
Total shots	20	16
Shots on target	8	5
Ball possession	—N/a	—N/a
Corner kicks	8	9
Fouls committed	23	20
Offsides	5	2
Yellow cards	6	3
Red cards	1	0

== Aftermath ==
After the players had collected their medals, UEFA president Lennart Johansson handed over the trophy to Bülent Korkmaz. Korkmaz celebrated by raising the silverware, together with Şükür and the rest of the Galatasaray squad on the podium, including the ejected Hagi himself as golden confetti rained down. A selected UEFA panel named Taffarel as the man of the match, and presented him with a trophy after the game.

Galatasaray manager Fatih Terim expressed his delight following his side's victory. He was interviewed by the Turkish press and dedicated the cup to Turkey and its public, particularly to those who lost their lives during the 1999 İzmit earthquake: "Many people suffered terribly in the earthquake in Turkey last year and if this victory brings some happiness back into their lives then I am delighted and so are all the players. We are very proud if we are able to help the Turkish people in some small way and this victory is for the whole country and all of the soccer fans in Turkey. I believe they were all united behind us". Terim also praised his own players and Taffarel: "I am proud and delighted he is in my team. He was magnificent and thoroughly deserved to be man of the match". Popescu, a former defender of Tottenham Hotspur, also indulged in the triumph and said: "I am sure the fans at my old club are delighted as well!"

As some Arsenal players were seen consoling each other, manager Arsène Wenger was left to rue the defeat and said that his Arsenal side could not take their chances: "It was not a huge advantage for us to have Hagi sent off, sometimes you defend better with 10 men because everybody is focused." He was displeased with the penalty shoot-out and criticised Spanish referee Antonio López Nieto for deciding the penalty shoot-out to take place in front of Galatasaray fans. Wenger was also unhappy with the decision made by UEFA officials regarding a coin toss during extra time, which would affect where the spot kicks would be taken.

The win was widely celebrated in Turkey; Galatasaray players and staff received a hero's welcome in Istanbul from the club's fans. The Turkish media hailed the match as one of the best achievements in their sports history and the biggest in football, the country's most popular sport. The Ministry of Youth and Sports minister Fikret Ünlü, who attended the final, described the performance as "marvelous" and "a big present from Galatasaray to Turkey". Ahmet Necdet Sezer, the President of Turkey highlighted the club's success by awarding the team with the State Medal of Distinguished Service, as a result for winning the country's first European competition. In August 2013 the two sides met in an Emirates Cup pre-season match. The friendly ended in a 2–1 win for Galatasaray.

== Fan riots ==
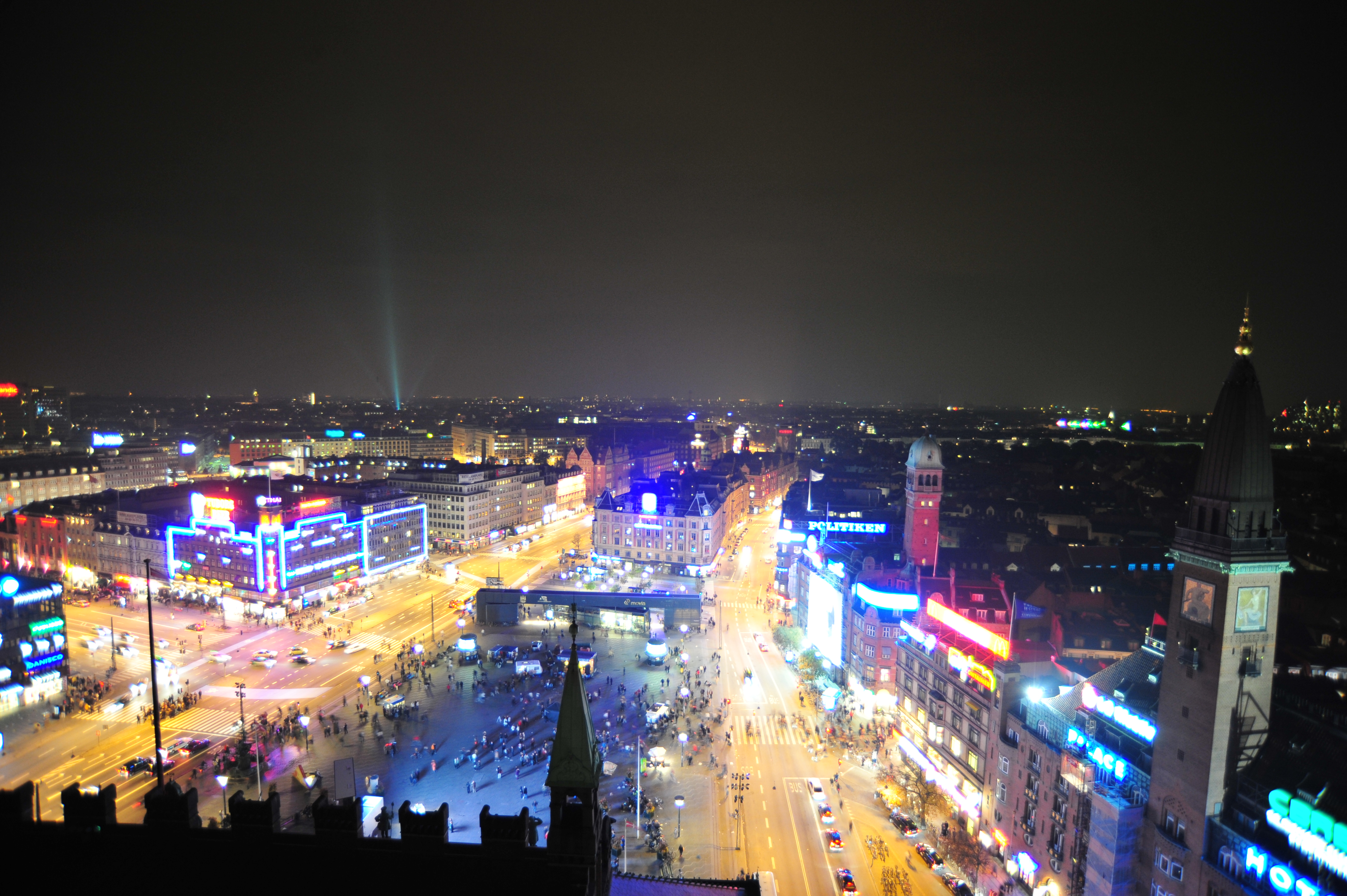
The City Hall Square, where the riots took place

The final was overshadowed by riots between the two sides – it began when Galatasaray fans stormed a club in Strøget, composed of Arsenal supporters. Arsenal fans responded by provoking the Galatasaray followers, along with fans of other clubs involved, as retribution for the two Leeds United supporters murdered, before the club's semi-final first leg match against Galatasaray. Four Britons and Turks were apprehended by the Danish riot police following the violence. The turmoil was covered by some British media; tabloid newspaper the Daily Mirror, published images, believed to be the Arsenal fans involved in the onslaught, while BBC News, ITN News and Sky News reported and broadcast television footage of the riots.

One Arsenal supporter, Paul Dineen was stabbed in the back with a knife, during the riots in a pub, near the City Hall Square. The incident caused Arsenal to offer their fans full compensation, if they did not want to travel and attend the match. Another three members of the public, identified as one Englishman, Turk and Dutchman were also wounded by knifing when the event was still under its way. Sixty people, all presumed to have been involved, were detained by Danish law enforcement, while another 19 suffered injuries as a result of the violence.

== See also ==
- 2000 UEFA Champions League final
- 2000 UEFA Super Cup
- Arsenal F.C. in European football
- Galatasaray S.K. in international football
- 1999–2000 Arsenal F.C. season
- 1999–2000 Galatasaray S.K. season
