= Gusar =

Gusar may refer to:

- Gusar, Tajikistan, a village near Panjakent
- Gusar District, a region in the northeast of Azerbaijan
- Gusar (city), the capital of the district in Azerbaijan
- Gusar, Iran, a village near Nehbandan
- HVK Gusar, a rowing club from Split, Croatia
- Emre Güsar (born 1977), a Turkish football player
