= Bruno Quadros =

Brazilian footballer and manager (born 1977)

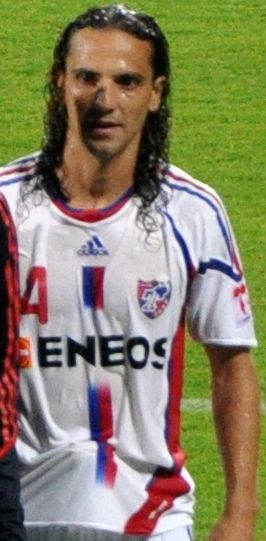
- Quadros with FC Tokyo in 2009

Personal information
- Full name: Bruno Everton Quadros
- Date of birth: February 3, 1977 (age 49)
- Place of birth: Rio de Janeiro, Brazil
- Height: 1.84 m (6 ft 0 in)
- Position: Defender

Team information
- Current team: Hokkaido Consadole Sapporo (assistant)

Youth career
- Flamengo

Senior career*
Years	Team	Apps	(Gls)
1996–1998	Flamengo	32	(2)
1998	Botafogo	12	(1)
1999	Flamengo		
1999–2000	Galatasaray	2	(0)
2000	İstanbulspor	10	(0)
2000–2001	Flamengo		
2001	Sport Recife	3	(0)
2002	São Caetano		
2002–2003	Guarani	59	(2)
2004	Cruzeiro	14	(0)
2005–2006	Cerezo Osaka	56	(0)
2007	Consadole Sapporo	43	(1)
2008–2009	FC Tokyo	25	(0)
2010	Alki Larnaca	9	(0)
2011–2012	Linense	23	(0)

Managerial career
- 2012–2014: Linense
- 2014: Duque de Caxias
- 2015: Marília
- 2016–: Hokkaido Consadole Sapporo (assistant)
- * Club domestic league appearances and goals as of 16 July 2010

Bruno Everton Quadros, or simply Bruno Quadros (born February 3, 1977), is a Brazilian manager and former defender who currently works as the assistant head coach of Cerezo Osaka.

== Club statistics ==
Club performance			League		Cup		League Cup		Total	
Season	Club	League	Apps	Goals	Apps	Goals	Apps	Goals	Apps	Goals
Brazil			League		Copa do Brasil		League Cup		Total	
1997	Flamengo	Série A	20	1					20	1
1998	Flamengo	Série A	12	1					12	1
1998	Botafogo	Série A	12	1					12	1
1999	Flamengo	Série A	0	0					0	0
Turkey			League		Türkiye Kupası		League Cup		Total	
1999/00	Galatasaray	First League	9	0					9	0
Brazil			League		Copa do Brasil		League Cup		Total	
2000	Flamengo	Série A	1	0					1	0
2001	Flamengo	Série A	0	0					0	0
2001	Sport Recife	Série A	3	0					3	0
2002	São Caetano	Série A	0	0					0	0
2002	Guarani	Série A	18	1					18	1
2003	Guarani	Série A	41	1					41	1
2004	Cruzeiro	Série A	14	0					14	0
Japan			League		Emperor's Cup		J.League Cup		Total	
2005	Cerezo Osaka	J1 League	33	0	4	1	8	1	45	2
2006	Cerezo Osaka	J1 League	23	0	1	0	7	0	31	0
2007	Consadole Sapporo	J2 League	43	1	0	0	-		43	1
2008	FC Tokyo	J1 League	2	0	0	0	4	2	6	2
2009	FC Tokyo	J1 League	23	0	3	1	8	0	34	1
Country	Brazil		121	5					121	5
Country	Turkey		9	0					9	0
Country	Japan		124	1	8	2	27	3	159	6
Total			254	6	8	2	27	3	289	11

== Honors ==
FC Tokyo

- J.League Cup : 2009
