= Ergün Penbe =

Turkish footballer and manager

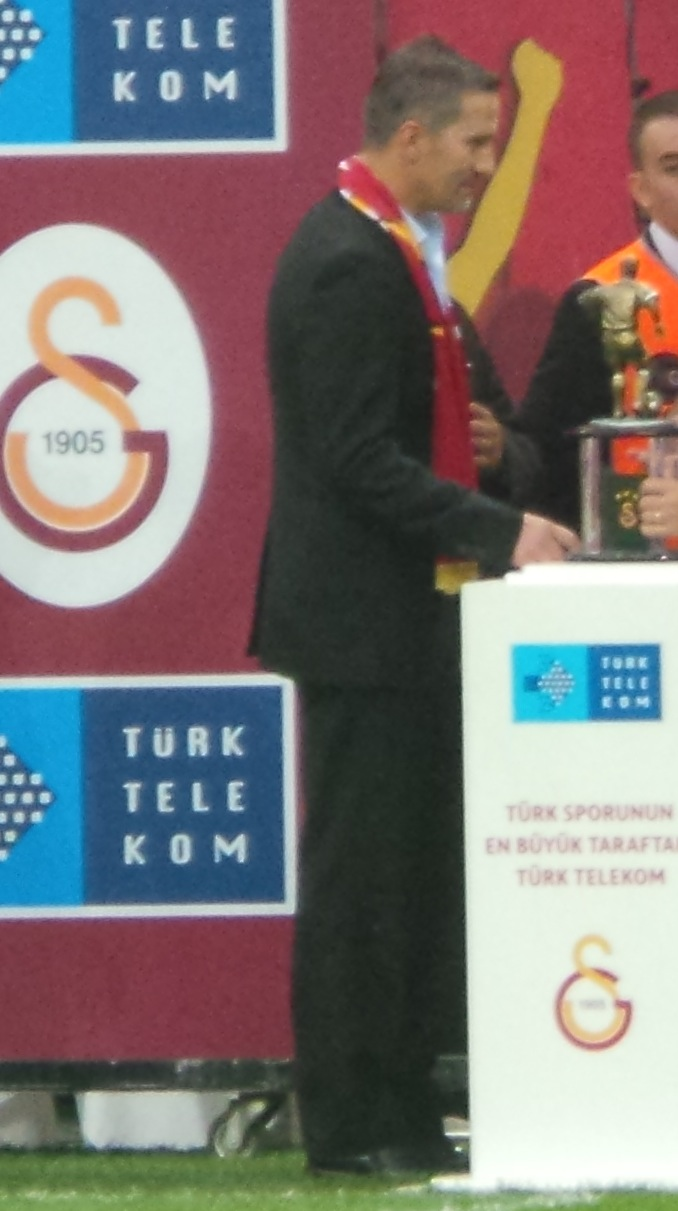
- Penbe with Galatasaray in 2013

Personal information
- Date of birth: 17 May 1972 (age 54)
- Place of birth: Zonguldak, Turkey
- Height: 1.78 m (5 ft 10 in)
- Positions: Left midfielder; left back

Team information
- Current team: Yeni Mersin İdmanyurdu (head coach)

Youth career
- Kilimli Belediyespor

Senior career*
Years	Team	Apps	(Gls)
1990–1992	Kilimli Belediyespor	51	(6)
1992–1994	Gençlerbirliği	57	(3)
1994–2007	Galatasaray	305	(10)
2007–2008	Gaziantepspor	17	(0)
Total		430	(19)

International career
1992-1993	Turkey U-21	5	(1)
1994–2006	Turkey	48	(0)

Managerial career
- 2008–2009: Hacettepe (assistant)
- 2009: Hacettepe
- 2010: Mersin İdmanyurdu (assistant)
- 2010–2011: Kartalspor
- 2011: Kayseri Erciyesspor
- 2012–2013: Giresunspor
- 2017: İnegölspor
- 2019–2021: Tarsus İdman Yurdu
- 2022: Çorumspor
- 2024–: Yeni Mersin İdmanyurdu
Medal record
Third place	FIFA World Cup	2002
- * Club domestic league appearances and goals

Ergün Penbe (born 17 May 1972), known by his nickname Kemik –literally meaning the Bone–, is a Turkish former professional footballer who played mostly as a left midfielder and left back, and is currently the manager of Yeni Mersin İdmanyurdu.

He is known for his "fair play" approach to the game, having gone through two seasons of football without a single booking. He also received the nickname Kemik (the bone), because of his calmness and ability to hold the team together. He spent most of his professional career with Galatasaray, winning a total of 12 titles. He wore number 67 during his career in honor of the identifying vehicle plate code number of his hometown, Zonguldak.

== Club career ==
Born in Zonguldak, Black Sea, Ergün begun his professional career with Gençlerbirliği SK. After that, in the 1994 summer, he signed with top division giants Galatasaray SK, being one of the team's most influential players in the following decade (in a variety of positions, including left back), and playing a very important part in the side's exploits from 1999–2001, which brought a total of six titles – two domestic doubles, the UEFA Cup and the UEFA Super Cup; in the first competition's final, he scored in the penalty shootout win against Arsenal.

On 27 August 2007, 35-year-old Ergün signed a 1+1 year contract with Gaziantepspor. He made his debut for his new team on 31 October in a Turkish Cup clash against Fenerbahçe. After helping the side finish eighth in the league, with the player appearing in exactly half of the games, he decided to retire at the age of 36.

Immediately after retiring, Ergün was appointed as assistant manager of lowly Hacettepe Spor Kulübü on 5 November 2008. After Erdoğan Arıca's resignation he was promoted to head coach, but could not prevent the club from being relegated to the second division.

On 12 February 2010, Ergün signed with Mersin Idman Yurdu in that same category, until the end of the season.

== International career ==
Ergün represented Turkey on 48 occasions, all of his caps coming whilst he was at Galatasaray, in a 12-year span.

He was part of the nation's final squads at UEFA Euro 2000 and the 2002 FIFA World Cup, playing in three matches in the former competition and five in the latter, as it respectively reached the quarterfinals and finished in third place.

== Managerial career ==
On October 1, 2024, he reached an agreement with Yeni Mersin İdmanyurdu, TFF 2. Lig team, until the end of the 2024-25 season.

== Career statistics ==
=== Club ===
Appearances and goals by club, season and competition
Club	Season	League		National cup		League cup		Europe		Total	
Club	Season	Apps	Goals	Apps	Goals	Apps	Goals	Apps	Goals	Apps	Goals
Gençlerbirliği	1991–92	1	0							1	0
Gençlerbirliği	1992–93	30	1							30	1
Gençlerbirliği	1993–94	26	2							26	2
Gençlerbirliği	Total	57	3	0	0	0	0	0	0	57	3
Galatasaray	1994–95	15	0							15	0
Galatasaray	1995–96	18	0							18	0
Galatasaray	1996–97	29	2							29	2
Galatasaray	1997–98	27	1							27	1
Galatasaray	1998–99	24	1							24	1
Galatasaray	1999–2000	28	1							28	1
Galatasaray	2000–01	27	1							27	1
Galatasaray	2001–02	31	1							31	1
Galatasaray	2002–03	27	2							27	2
Galatasaray	2003–04	24	0							24	0
Galatasaray	2004–05	32	1							32	1
Galatasaray	2005–06	15	0							15	0
Galatasaray	2006–07	8	0							8	0
Galatasaray	Total	305	10	0	0	0	0	0	0	305	10
Gaziantepspor	2007–08	17	0							17	0
Career total		379	13	0	0	0	0	0	0	379	13

=== International ===
Appearances and goals by national team and year
National team	Year	Apps	Goals
Turkey	1994	1	0
Turkey	1997	1	0
Turkey	1999	1	0
Turkey	2000	7	0
Turkey	2001	7	0
Turkey	2002	12	0
Turkey	2003	15	0
Turkey	2005	3	0
Turkey	2006	1	0
Total		48	0

== Managerial statistics ==
As of 9 June 2011

Team	From	To	Record				
Team	From	To	G	W	D	L	Win %
Hacettepe	March 2009	June 2009	10	2	2	6	20.00
Mersin İdmanyurdu	February 2010	2010	14	4	6	4	28.57
Kartalspor	June 2010	January 2011	15	1	9	5	6.67
Kayseri Erciyesspor	March 2011	May 2011	10	5	3	2	50.00
Total			49	12	20	17	24.49

== Honours ==
Galatasaray

- Turkish League: 1996–97, 1997–98, 1998–99, 1999–2000, 2001–02, 2005–06
- Turkish Cup: 1995–96, 1998–99, 1999–2000, 2004–05
- UEFA Cup: 1999–2000
- UEFA Super Cup: 2000

Turkey

- FIFA World Cup: third place 2002
- FIFA Confederations Cup: third place 2003

Order

- Turkish State Medal of Distinguished Service
