= Bülent Korkmaz =

Turkish footballer and manager

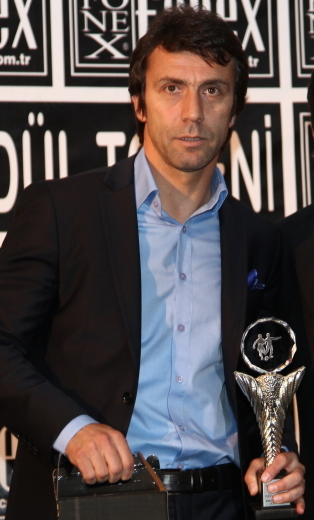
- Korkmaz in 2012

Personal information
- Full name: Bülent Korkmaz
- Date of birth: 24 November 1968 (age 57)
- Place of birth: Malatya, Turkey
- Height: 5 ft 11 in (1.80 m)
- Position: Defender

Youth career
- 1979–1985: Galatasaray

Senior career*
Years	Team	Apps	(Gls)
1987–2005	Galatasaray	430	(15)
Total		430	(15)

International career
1988	Turkey U21	3	(0)
1990–2005	Turkey	102	(3)

Managerial career
- 2006: Kayseri Erciyesspor
- 2007: Bursaspor
- 2007–2008: Gençlerbirliği
- 2009: Galatasaray
- 2009–2010: Baku
- 2011–2012: Karabükspor
- 2012–2013: İstanbul BB
- 2014–2015: Kayseri Erciyesspor
- 2015–2016: Mersin İdman Yurdu
- 2018–2019: Antalyaspor
- 2020: Konyaspor
- 2021: Alanyaspor
- 2022–2023: Çaykur Rizespor
- 2025: Esenler Erokspor
- 2026: Antalyaspor
Medal record
Representing Turkey
Men's football
FIFA World Cup
Third place	2002 Korea/Japan
- * Club domestic league appearances and goals

Bülent Korkmaz (born 24 November 1968), colloquially known by his given nicknames "Büyük Kaptan" (lit. 'Great Captain') and "Cengaver" (lit. 'Warrior'), is a Turkish football coach and former professional player.

Korkmaz was a one club man during his club career, playing as a centre-back for Galatasaray for his whole career for 18 consecutive seasons between 1987 and 2005, winning 8 Süper Lig, 6 Turkish Cup, 5 Turkish Super Cup,1 UEFA Cup and 1 UEFA Super Cup titles.

He is the 13th player in history to make over 100 appearances across European club competitions.

Korkmaz has got 102 senior caps for Turkey national football team.

== Club career ==
Korkmaz started his career at Galatasaray Futbol Akademisi as a goalkeeper in 1979. He changed his field role to become a defender following the advice from his youth coach. He was offered a professional contract by German club Bayer Leverkusen at the age of 16 but he chose to stay at Galatasaray and he was eventually promoted to senior squad in 1987.

Korkmaz was a part of squad reaching semi-finals of 1988–89 edition of UEFA European Cup. During the 2000 UEFA Cup Final between Galatasaray and Arsenal, he dislocated his shoulder but he declined to quit the game, continued the game until the end following in-field physio treatment where Galatasaray won the cup after extra time. However, the injury caused Korkmaz eventually to miss UEFA Euro 2000 competition.

Korkmaz was invited to play at "FIFA XI" squad against the 2002 FIFA World Cup hosts "Japan & Korea XI" at World Dream soccer exhibition, held at Yokohama International Stadium on 3 January 2001.

== International career ==
Korkmaz was part of the Turkey national team that finished third at the 2002 FIFA World Cup and, in 2003, had the same finishing position at the FIFA Confederations Cup. Korkmaz also represented Turkey in EURO 96.

== Coaching career ==
On 30 August 2005, Korkmaz was appointed as the assistant manager at Gençlerbirliği S.K., and resigned during the same season. In January 2007, he signed in Kayseri Erciyesspor as head coach while the team were sitting at the bottom of the ladder. Under Korkmaz's management, Kayseri Erciyesspor reached the final of 2006–07 Turkish Cup, losing 0–1 to Beşiktaş J.K., however; spotting 17th position, they relegated at the end of the season. On 23 February 2009, after the departure of Michael Skibbe, Korkmaz was appointed as the head coach of Galatasaray. Putting a performance of 7 wins out of 15 official games, his was sacked by the club in June 2009. On 8 November 2011, after the resignation of Yücel İldiz, Korkmaz joined Karabükspor as the head coach. Taking the team over from 16th position of standings, he managed the team to finish the season at 12th place, for a safe avoiding the relegation. In same season, Karabükspor reached semi-finals at 2011–12 Turkish Cup, for the first time at club's history. On 13 November 2012, Korkmaz replaced Carlos Carvalhal at İstanbul Büyükşehir Belediyespor. His contract was mutually terminated after his team got relegated as of 30 May 2013.

On 26 June 2026, Kormaz returned to Antalyaspor.

== Style of play and reception ==
Korkmaz was described as "an aggressive and powerful defender" by Bleacher Report, in 2014. Ozan Kabak, another home-grown Galatasaray player, expressed that he idolised Korkmaz, in 2020.

== Personal life ==
Korkmaz was born in Malatya in 1968. His younger brother, Mert Korkmaz (born 1971) is also a former professional footballer, played also for Galatasaray and holds 5 caps for Turkey. Korkmaz is married and has 2 daughters.

== Career statistics ==
=== Club ===
Appearances and goals by club, season and competition
Club	Season	League			Turkish Cup		Other Cup (Note: Appearances in President Cup and Prime Minister's Cup)		Continental (Note: Appearances in UEFA Champions League, UEFA Cup and UEFA Super Cup)		Total	
Club	Season	Division	Apps	Goals	Apps	Goals	Apps	Goals	Apps	Goals	Apps	Goals
Galatasaray	1987–88	1. Lig (Note: Named respectively as Milli Lig between 1959–1962, Türkiye 1. Futbol Ligi (1. Lig) between 1962–2000, and Süper Lig from 2001 to present)	0	0	1	0	1	0	—		2	0
Galatasaray	1988–89	1. Lig	10	0	1	0	1	0	7	0	19	0
Galatasaray	1989–90	1. Lig	19	0	0	0	1	0	2	0	22	0
Galatasaray	1990–91	1. Lig	30	1	4	0	1	0	—		35	1
Galatasaray	1991–92	1. Lig	27	3	2	0	—		5	0	34	3
Galatasaray	1992–93	1. Lig	29	1	6	0	1	0	5	0	41	1
Galatasaray	1993–94	1. Lig	30	1	5	1	1	0	9	0	45	2
Galatasaray	1994–95	1. Lig	31	1	6	0	1	0	8	0	46	1
Galatasaray	1995–96	1. Lig	29	0	6	0	1	0	2	0	38	0
Galatasaray	1996–97	1. Lig	32	2	1	0	1	0	4	0	38	2
Galatasaray	1997–98	1. Lig	29	1	7	0	—		8	0	44	1
Galatasaray	1998–99	1. Lig	21	1	6	0	—		2	0	29	1
Galatasaray	1999–00	1. Lig	22	0	3	1	—		8	0	33	1
Galatasaray	2000–01	1. Lig	27	0	2	0	—		15	1	44	1
Galatasaray	2001–02	Süper Lig	26	3	0	0	—		12	0	38	3
Galatasaray	2002–03	Süper Lig	30	1	2	0	—		6	0	38	1
Galatasaray	2003–04	Süper Lig	23	0	0	0	—		8	0	31	0
Galatasaray	2004–05	Süper Lig	13	0	2	0	—		0	0	15	0
Career total			428	15	54	2	9	0	101	1	592	18

=== International ===
Appearances and goals by national team and year
National team	Year	Apps	Goals
Turkey	1990	2	0
Turkey	1991	8	0
Turkey	1992	8	0
Turkey	1993	6	1
Turkey	1994	7	1
Turkey	1995	11	0
Turkey	1996	9	0
Turkey	1997	4	0
Turkey	1998	0	0
Turkey	1999	0	0
Turkey	2000	5	0
Turkey	2001	4	0
Turkey	2002	15	1
Turkey	2003	14	0
Turkey	2004	7	0
Turkey	2005	2	0
Total		102	3

=== Managerial statistics ===
As of 20 May 2022

Managerial record by team and tenure
Team	Nat.	From	To	Record					Ref.
Team	Nat.	From	To	G	W	D	L	Win %	Ref.
Kayseri Erciyesspor	(Turkey)	16 January 2006	29 May 2007	17	7	5	5	41.18	
Bursaspor	(Turkey)	27 June 2007	22 October 2007	9	1	4	4	11.11	
Gençlerbirliği	(Turkey)	1 November 2007	30 January 2008	10	2	3	5	20.00	
Galatasaray	(Turkey)	25 February 2009	30 June 2009	16	8	4	4	50.00	
Baku	(Azerbaijan)	24 September 2009	22 March 2010	44	16	14	14	36.36	
Karabükspor	(Turkey)	16 November 2011	30 June 2012	28	14	3	11	50.00	
İstanbul BB	(Turkey)	14 November 2012	30 June 2013	23	6	7	10	26.09	
Kayseri Erciyesspor	(Turkey)	30 July 2014	25 November 2014	11	1	6	4	9.09	
Mersin İdman Yurdu	(Turkey)	22 September 2015	4 January 2016	15	3	4	8	20.00	
Antalyaspor	(Turkey)	14 June 2018	15 November 2019	52	20	10	22	38.46	
Konyaspor	(Turkey)	13 February 2020	12 September 2020	13	4	4	5	30.77	
Alanyaspor	(Turkey)	6 September 2021	30 December 2021	16	7	4	5	43.75	
Çaykur Rizespor	(Turkey)	20 February 2022	8 June 2023	47	21	15	11	44.68	
Total				301	110	83	108	36.54	

== Honours ==
Turkey

- FIFA World Cup third-place: 2002
- FIFA Confederations Cup third-place: 2003

Galatasaray

- UEFA Cup: 1999–2000
- UEFA Super Cup: 2000
- Süper Lig (8): 1987–88, 1992–93, 1993–94, 1996–97, 1997–98, 1998–99, 1999–00, 2001–02
- Turkish Cup (6): 1990–91, 1992–93, 1995–96, 1998–99, 1999–2000, 2004–05
- Turkish Super Cup: 1988, 1991, 1993, 1996, 1997
- Chancellor Cup: 1990, 1995
- TSYD Cup (6): 1987–88, 1991–92, 1992–93, 1997–98, 1998–99, 1999–2000

Order

- Turkish State Medal of Distinguished Service

== See also ==
- List of men's footballers with 100 or more international caps
- List of one-club men

Sporting positions
Preceded by Tugay Kerimoğlu	Galatasaray captain 1995–2005	Succeeded by Hakan Şükür
