= Capone (footballer) =

Brazilian footballer (born 1972)

Personal information
- Full name: Carlos Alberto de Oliveira
- Date of birth: 23 May 1972 (age 54)
- Place of birth: Campinas, Brazil
- Height: 1.80 m (5 ft 11 in)
- Position: Defender

Youth career
- Ponte Preta

Senior career*
Years	Team	Apps	(Gls)
1990	Ponte Preta		
1991–1996	Mogi Mirim		
1996	São Paulo	13	(0)
1997	Kyoto Purple Sanga	10	(0)
1998–1999	Juventude	23	(2)
1999–2002	Galatasaray	67	(4)
2002	Kocaelispor	4	(0)
2003	Corinthians	0	(0)
2003	Atlético Paranaense	14	(0)
2004	Beitar Jerusalem	15	(1)
2004	Grêmio	8	(0)
2006	Portuguesa Santista		
2007	Londrina		
2008	Portuguesa Santista		
2010	Sorriso		
2010	Matsubara		

Managerial career
- 2009: Força
- * Club domestic league appearances and goals

Carlos Alberto de Oliveira (born 23 May 1972), known as Capone, is a Brazilian former professional footballer who played as a defender.

== Career statistics ==
Appearances and goals by club, season and competition
Club	Season	League			National cup (Note: Includes Emperor's Cup.)		League cup (Note: Includes J.League Cup.)		Total	
Club	Season	Division	Apps	Goals	Apps	Goals	Apps	Goals	Apps	Goals
Kyoto Purple Sanga	1997	J1 League	10	0	1	0	5	0	16	0
Total			10	0	1	0	5	0	16	0

== Honours ==
Mogi Mirim

- Campeonato Paulista Série A2: 1995

Juventude

- Campeonato Gaúcho: 1998
- Copa do Brasil: 1999

Galatasaray

- Turkish Cup: 1999–2000
- UEFA Cup: 1999–2000
- Turkish Super League: 1999–2000, 2001–02
- UEFA Super Cup: 2000

Corinthians

- Campeonato Paulista: 2003
