= Antonio López Nieto =

Spanish football referee (born 1958)

- Full name: Antonio Jesús López Nieto
- Born: 25 January 1958 (age 68); Málaga, Spain
- Other occupation: Architect

Domestic
Years	League	Role
1988-2003	La Liga	Referee

International
Years	League	Role
1993-2003	FIFA-listed	Referee

Antonio Jesús López Nieto (born 25 January 1958 in Málaga, Andalusia) is a former Spanish football referee, who officiated at one FIFA World Cup and during the UEFA Champions League.

In 1995, López accused representatives of Dynamo Kyiv of attempting to bribe him before a UEFA Champions League game against Panathinaikos of Greece, a charge Dynamo Kyiv continue to deny. As a result of this accusation, UEFA banned Dynamo from competitions for two years, a sanction that was later overturned.

He has refereed in three UEFA Cup finals, in 1995 (first leg), 1998 and 2000. López set a record at the 2002 FIFA World Cup, issuing 14 yellow cards and 2 red cards in a match between Germany and Cameroon. This record was then broken in the 2006 tournament by Valentin Ivanov during the match between Portugal and Netherlands, who issued 16 yellow cards and 4 red cards.

Preceded by UEFA Cup Final 1997 (France) Marc Batta (Spain) José García Aranda	UEFA Cup Final Referees; Final 1998 (Spain) Antonio López Nieto	Succeeded by UEFA Cup Final 1999 (Scotland) Hugh Dallas
Preceded by UEFA Cup Final 1999 (Scotland) Hugh Dallas	UEFA Cup Final Referees; Final 2000 (Spain) Antonio López Nieto	Succeeded by UEFA Cup Final 2001 (France) Gilles Veissière
