= Márcio Mixirica =

Brazilian footballer

Personal information
- Full name: Márcio Mandinga dos Santos
- Date of birth: 23 January 1975 (age 51)
- Place of birth: Mogi das Cruzes, Brazil
- Height: 1.85 m (6 ft 1 in)
- Position: Striker

Senior career*
Years	Team	Apps	(Gls)
1994–1998	Bragantino	30	(6)
1998	Etti Jundiaí		
1999	São José		
1999	Juventude	2	(0)
1999	Portuguesa	4	(0)
1999–2001	Galatasaray	28	(9)
2001–2003	Boavista	19	(2)
2004	Atlético Mineiro	20	(7)
2005	São Caetano	18	(2)
2006	Santa Cruz	21	(4)
2007	Sertãozinho		
2007–2009	Santo André		
2009–2010	Ponte Preta		
- * Club domestic league appearances and goals

Márcio Mandinga dos Santos (born 23 January 1975), usually known as Márcio Mixirica, is a Brazilian football striker currently playing for Ponte Preta.

== Honours ==
Galatasaray

- Turkish Super League: 1999–2000
- UEFA Cup: 1999–2000
- Turkish Cup: 1999–2000
