= Emre Güsar =

Turkish footballer (born 1977)

Personal information
- Date of birth: 4 September 1977 (age 49)
- Place of birth: Izmit, Turkey
- Height: 1.85 m (6 ft 1 in)
- Position: Defender

Senior career*
Years	Team	Apps	(Gls)
1996–1997	Kırklarelispor		
1997–2000	Altay		
2000–2001	Konyaspor		
2001–2002	Göztepe		
2002–2003	Bursaspor		
2003–2004	Kayserispor		
2004	Kocaelispor		
2004	Manisaspor		
2005–2006	Karşıyaka		
2006–2007	Mardinspor		
2007–2008	Adana Demirspor		
2008–2009	Körfez Belediyespor		
- * Club domestic league appearances and goals

Emre Güsar (born 4 September 1977) is a retired Turkish football defender.
