= 1999–2000 1.Lig =

42nd season of top-tier Turkish football

1.Lig
- Season: 1999–2000
- Champions: Galatasaray; 14th title
- Relegated: Altay; Göztepe; Vanspor
- Champions League: Galatasaray; Beşiktaş
- UEFA Cup: Gaziantepspor; Antalyaspor
- Intertoto Cup: Kocaelispor
- Matches: 306
- Goals: 878 (2.87 per match)
- Top goalscorer: Serkan Aykut (30 goals)

Statistics of Turkish First Football League in the 1999–2000 season.

== Overview ==
It was contested by 18 teams, and Galatasaray S.K. won the championship. And demotion of Altay S.K., Göztepe A.Ş., Vanspor was decided.

== League table ==
Pos	Team	Pld	W	D	L	GF	GA	GD	Pts	Qualification or relegation
1	Galatasaray (C)	34	24	7	3	77	23	+54	79	Qualification to Champions League third qualifying round
2	Beşiktaş	34	23	6	5	74	27	+47	75	Qualification to Champions League second qualifying round
3	Gaziantepspor	34	17	11	6	49	27	+22	62	Qualification to UEFA Cup first round
4	Fenerbahçe	34	17	10	7	59	44	+15	61	
5	Gençlerbirliği	34	16	8	10	57	47	+10	56	
6	Trabzonspor	34	15	8	11	47	41	+6	53	
7	Samsunspor	34	16	4	14	51	43	+8	52	
8	Denizlispor	34	13	8	13	55	57	−2	47	
9	Adanaspor	34	13	6	15	51	55	−4	45	
10	Bursaspor	34	12	6	16	51	63	−12	42	
11	Antalyaspor	34	11	8	15	42	58	−16	41	Qualification to UEFA Cup qualifying round (Note: Winner of 1999–2000 Turkish Cup, Galatasaray, qualified for UEFA Champions League, so the runner-up Antalyaspor qualified for the 2000-01 UEFA Cup qualifying round.)
12	Kocaelispor	34	11	7	16	44	58	−14	40	Qualification to Intertoto Cup first round
13	MKE Ankaragücü	34	9	12	13	45	56	−11	39	
14	Erzurumspor	34	10	8	16	40	61	−21	38	
15	İstanbulspor	34	8	13	13	38	43	−5	37	
16	Altay (R)	34	10	7	17	34	43	−9	37	Relegation to Turkish Second Football League
17	Göztepe (R)	34	7	5	22	26	54	−28	26	Relegation to Turkish Second Football League
18	Vanspor (R)	34	4	6	24	38	78	−40	18	Relegation to Turkish Second Football League

Rules for classification: 1) points; 2) goal difference; 3) number of goals scored.
(C) Champions; (R) Relegated

== Results ==
Home \ Away	ADA	ALT	ANT	BJK	BUR	DEN	ERZ	FNB	GAL	GAZ	GEN	GÖZ	İST	KOC	AGÜ	SAM	TRA	VAN
Adanaspor		1–0	1–2	1–3	1–1	3–2	2–0	1–3	3–4	3–0	1–2	2–0	2–1	3–0	2–2	0–1	1–2	2–0
Altay	2–1		2–0	2–2	1–2	1–0	3–0	2–3	1–0	1–3	0–2	0–0	0–0	0–1	0–0	2–1	3–1	2–0
Antalyaspor	2–2	3–1		2–2	1–1	2–2	1–2	2–3	1–3	0–0	2–1	1–0	0–3	3–0	0–0	0–1	0–2	4–1
Beşiktaş	0–1	3–0	4–0		5–1	1–1	2–0	1–3	1–1	1–0	4–0	2–1	3–0	1–0	3–1	4–0	1–1	2–1
Bursaspor	3–1	1–4	4–2	0–1		4–1	4–2	2–1	0–0	0–1	2–5	1–2	1–0	2–0	3–1	2–2	2–3	3–2
Denizlispor	4–2	2–1	4–0	0–2	1–3		2–1	1–1	2–4	1–0	1–3	2–0	3–1	3–1	1–1	4–1	0–2	1–0
Erzurumspor	4–1	0–0	4–0	1–4	4–1	0–1		1–5	0–0	1–1	1–1	0–0	0–0	3–3	2–1	1–0	2–1	2–0
Fenerbahçe	2–4	3–1	1–0	2–1	2–2	2–1	2–0		1–2	0–0	1–3	2–3	1–0	1–1	1–1	1–0	2–1	3–0
Galatasaray	4–0	3–1	2–0	1–0	6–0	2–2	4–1	0–1		1–2	6–0	2–0	1–1	5–0	5–0	3–1	2–0	2–1
Gaziantepspor	1–1	1–0	1–2	0–0	1–1	0–0	6–0	5–1	0–1		2–1	2–1	1–0	1–0	2–2	5–2	3–0	1–3
Gençlerbirliği	5–2	0–0	4–1	1–0	1–0	3–1	5–0	2–2	1–1	0–1		1–0	1–1	0–4	1–2	1–0	0–1	1–1
Göztepe	0–1	0–1	1–2	2–4	0–1	2–4	1–4	0–0	0–2	0–1	3–2		2–0	0–0	2–0	1–2	1–1	2–1
İstanbulspor	3–2	1–0	0–0	0–2	1–0	1–1	1–1	1–4	0–0	1–1	3–1	3–0		4–1	2–6	0–1	5–1	0–0
Kocaelispor	0–0	2–1	1–1	1–2	3–2	1–0	4–0	1–1	1–2	1–2	0–0	2–0	2–1		4–1	0–4	1–0	6–1
MKE Ankaragücü	0–0	3–0	1–3	2–3	2–1	3–1	1–0	1–1	0–2	1–1	0–0	1–2	2–2	3–2		1–2	1–1	1–0
Samsunspor	2–1	1–0	0–1	0–2	1–0	6–2	2–1	1–1	0–1	0–2	1–2	4–0	1–0	5–1	2–0		0–0	5–1
Trabzonspor	0–1	2–1	2–0	1–2	2–0	1–1	2–0	2–0	1–2	0–0	1–2	2–0	1–1	1–0	3–1	3–2		4–2
Vanspor	0–2	1–1	2–4	0–6	3–1	2–3	0–2	1–2	1–3	1–2	2–5	1–0	1–1	5–0	2–3	0–0	2–2	

Source: TFF, Mackolik
Legend: Blue = home team win; Yellow = draw; Red = away team win.

== Top scorers ==
Rank	Player	Club	Goals
1	(Turkey) Serkan Aykut	Samsunspor	30
2	(Turkey) Ahmet Dursun	Beşiktaş	21
3	(Turkey) Fazlı Ulusal	Antalyaspor	20
4	(Turkey) Ümit Karan	Gençlerbirliği	18
4	(Romania) Viorel Moldovan	Fenerbahçe	18
6	(Turkey) Cafer Aydın	Ankaragücü	16
6	(Turkey) Oktay Derelioğlu	Gaziantepspor	16
8	(Turkey) Ertuğrul Sağlam	Beşiktaş	14
8	(Turkey) Hakan Şükür	Galatasaray	14
10	(Turkey) Okan Yılmaz	Bursaspor	13
10	(Poland) Roman Dąbrowski	Kocaelispor	13
10	(Turkey) Hami Mandıralı	Trabzonspor	13
