= Hakan Şükür =

Turkish footballer (born 1971)

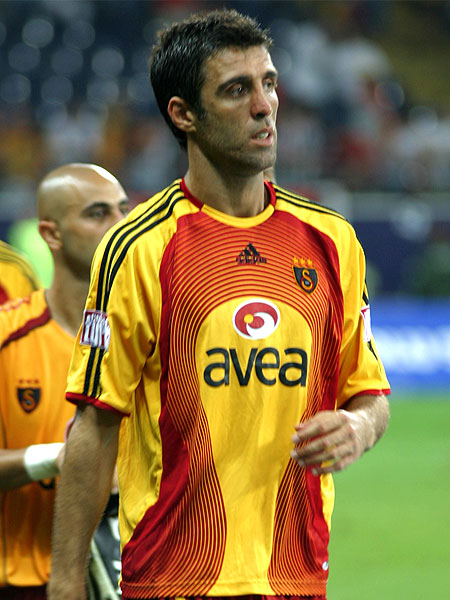
- Şükür playing for Galatasaray in 2006

Member of the Grand National Assembly
- In office 12 June 2011 – 23 June 2015
- Constituency: İstanbul (III)

Personal details
- Born: 1 September 1971 (age 55) Sapanca, Turkey
- Party: Independent (2013–present)
- Other political affiliations: Justice and Development Party (2011–2013)
- Spouses: Esra Elbirlik (m. 1995; div. 1995) Beyda Sertbaş (m. 1999)
- Children: 3
- Awards: State Medal of Distinguished Service (2002) (later revoked)
- Website: www.hakansukur.com.tr
Association football career
- Height: 1.91 m (6 ft 3 in)
- Position: Striker
Youth career
- Sakaryaspor
Senior career*
Years	Team	Apps	(Gls)
1987–1990	Sakaryaspor	41	(19)
1990–1992	Bursaspor	54	(11)
1992–1995	Galatasaray	90	(54)
1995	Torino	5	(1)
1995–2000	Galatasaray	156	(108)
2000–2002	Inter Milan	24	(5)
2002	Parma	15	(3)
2002–2003	Blackburn Rovers	9	(2)
2003–2008	Galatasaray	146	(55)
Total		540	(258)
International career
1987–1988	Turkey U16	6	(2)
1988–1990	Turkey U18	13	(1)
1990–1993	Turkey U21	16	(5)
1992–2007	Turkey	112	(51)
Medal record
Men's football
Representing Turkey
Mediterranean Games
Gold medal – first place	1993 Languedoc–Roussillon
FIFA World Cup
Third place	2002 Korea/Japan
- * Club domestic league appearances and goals

Hakan Şükür (Albanian: Shykyr; born 1 September 1971) is a Turkish former professional footballer who played as a striker. Nicknamed the "Bull of the Bosphorus" and Kral (king), he spent the majority of his professional career with Galatasaray, being a three-time Gol Kralı (Goal King, title and award given to the annual top goalscorer of the Süper Lig), representing the club in three different spells and winning a total of 14 major titles.

Şükür represented Turkey a total of 112 times, scoring 51 goals, making him the nation's top goalscorer and 19th in the world at the time of his retirement. One of the most prolific strikers of the modern era, he netted 383 goals throughout his club career as well as the fastest ever in a World Cup, in 2002. He retired from football in 2008.

In the 2011 general elections, he was elected as an Istanbul MP for the Justice and Development Party. He resigned from the party in December 2013, to serve as an independent MP. He has been wanted for arrest in Turkey since August 2016 for being a member of Gülen movement and has lived in exile in the United States since mid 2016. On 14 July 2017, a decree was issued by Erdoğan government stating that all medals awarded to Şükür were to be revoked.

== Club career ==
=== Early years ===
Born in Sapanca, Sakarya Province, Şükür began his football career with local club Sakaryaspor, making his professional debut shortly after his 17th birthday. His first goal came in a match against Eskişehirspor on 26 February 1989: with the match tied 2–2, he entered the pitch as a substitute and scored the winning goal; he went on to score a further 18 Süper Lig goals in his three-year spell with the club.

In the summer of 1990, Şükür joined fellow first division side Bursaspor. He scored six goals in 27 games in his second season, helping the team to a sixth-place finish, and making his Turkey national team debut shortly after.

=== Galatasaray – Torino ===
Subsequently, Şükür signed for national giants Galatasaray. Nicknamed the Bull of the Bosphorus, he scored 19 goals in thirty matches in his first year with the club, helping it win both the league and cup titles, adding 16 and 19, respectively, in the next two seasons and attracting the attention of Torino. In 1995, he moved to Turin, becoming the second Turkish player to ever play in Serie A, but returned to his country and Galatasaray in the following winter transfer window, after failing to settle and only netting once in the league.

Upon his return to Galatasaray, Şükür regained his scoring form, scoring 16 goals in the league and helping the club to win the cup. The following season, he collected 38 goals in the league, tying him for second-most goals scored in a season with Metin Oktay, one goal behind record holder Tanju Çolak; both players were playing for Galatasaray when they broke the record. Şükür also finished third in the ESM Golden Boot rankings with 57 points, behind Mário Jardel (60) and Ronaldo (68). He won the Gol Kralı award the following two seasons, netting 33 and 18 goals respectively, with the Galatasaray winning the title in all three seasons.

In the 1999–2000 season, Şükür's last with Galatasaray in his second stint, the team completed a domestic double for the second year in succession, and added the year's UEFA Cup, becoming the first Turkish side to win a European title; in the 4–1 penalty shootout win against Arsenal, he scored on his attempt, having netted ten times in 17 games during the campaign.

=== Return to Italy – Blackburn ===
Şükür then moved to Italy again, this time to Inter Milan, scoring six goals in 35 official matches. His appearances were limited by the presence of Ronaldo and Christian Vieri in the team's attack and January 2002, after one-and-a-half seasons, he signed with another team in the country, Parma, but was unable to produce again, only finding the net three times. He helped Parma win the Coppa Italia, but only played in the first leg of the final.

Having been released, on 9 December 2002, Şükür joined Blackburn Rovers in the Premier League for the remainder of the campaign, signed by former Galatasaray manager Graeme Souness. His spell began with him sustaining a broken leg in training, which ruled him out for two months, after which made his debut for the club on 1 March 2003, replacing the injured Egil Østenstad at half time in a 1–0 home win over Manchester City; he scored twice from nine appearances, both goals coming in a 4–0 defeat of Fulham at Loftus Road on 7 April.

=== Third spell at Galatasaray ===
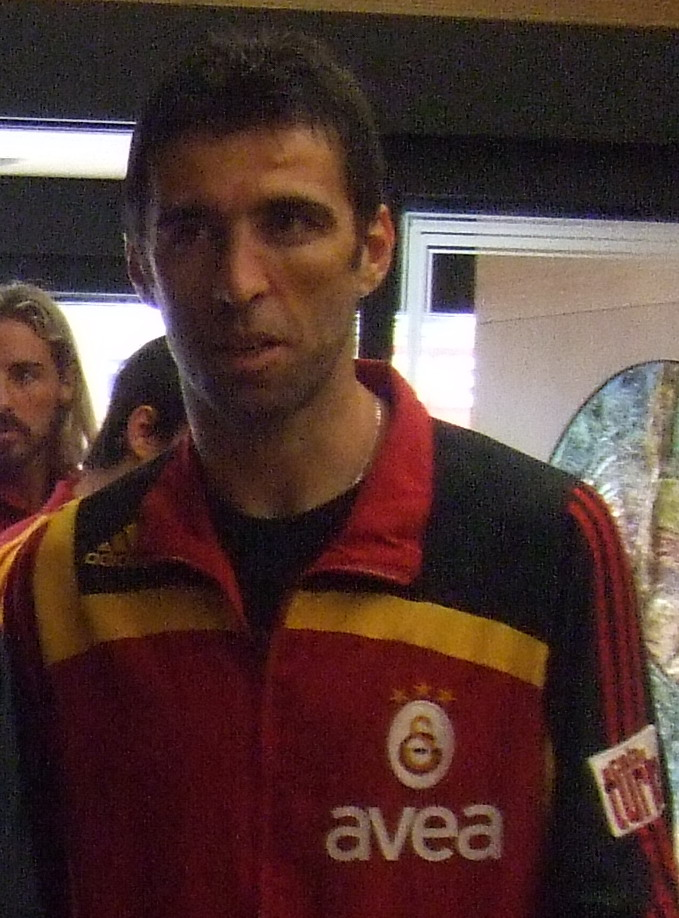
Şükür in 2008

Şükür returned to Galatasaray on 7 July 2003, after failing to negotiate a new contract with Blackburn. He scored 12 times in 28 league games in his first season and 18 in the following, with the team winning the 2005 Turkish cup during that timeframe. Also, on 3 December 2003, he found the net twice in a 2–0 home defeat of Juventus for the 2003–04 UEFA Champions League; in November 2003, to celebrate UEFA's Jubilee, he was selected as Turkey's Golden Player by the Turkish Football Federation, as their most outstanding player of the past fifty years.

In the 2005–06 season, Şükür again scored in double digits (ten) as Galatasaray again won the league. After helping the club win a record-tying 17th first division title in 2007–08, netting eleven goals, he decided to retire from the game, aged nearly 37. Subsequently, he often appeared as a television pundit on the Turkish Radio and Television Corporation; during his career, he scored 38 goals in all European competitions.

== International career ==
Şükür won his first cap for Turkey in a friendly with Luxembourg in March 1992 – his debut being awarded by German manager Sepp Piontek – scoring his first international goal in his next match, against Denmark, and totalling six in his first 11 appearances. He netted seven in qualification for UEFA Euro 1996 and started all of the matches at the finals in England, in which they were eliminated in the group stage without scoring a single goal.

Şükür scored eight times in qualification for the 1998 FIFA World Cup: half of those in a 6–4 home win over Wales on 20 August 1997, but Turkey did not reach the play-offs. At Euro 2000, he netted twice for the quarter-finalists, in a 2–0 group stage win against co-hosts Belgium.

During the 2002 World Cup, held in South Korea and Japan, Şükür scored once for Turkey in seven matches, as the national team finished in third place. On 29 June, he scored the fastest ever goal in a FIFA World Cup and in any major international football tournament, netting against South Korea 10.8 seconds into the third-place play-off, which Turkey went on to win 3–2.

Of his 112 senior appearances, Şükür captained Turkey in thirty. After appearing in some Euro 2008 qualifiers, notably scoring four against Moldova in a 5–0 win in Frankfurt, Germany, he was not selected for the finals, his last game being a 0–1 home loss to Greece at the age of 36 (17 October 2007).

== Personal life ==
Şükür is of Albanian origin. Both of his parents are immigrants from Yugoslavia, his father being born in Pristina, and his mother in Skopje. His surname is spelled "Shykyr" in Albanian. His first wife, Esra Elbirlik, married him in a ceremony broadcast live on television, initiated by Prime Minister Tansu Çiller and performed by Mayor of Istanbul Recep Tayyip Erdoğan.

The couple divorced after four months, and Elbirlik and her family died in the 1999 İzmit earthquake. Şükür fathered three children with his second spouse, Beyda. In 2010, the football stadium of Sancaktepe was named after him. In April 2014, his name was removed again.

== Politics ==
On 18 June 2011, Şükür was elected as a Member of Parliament to the Grand National Assembly of Turkey in the 2011 general elections, from the ruling Justice and Development Party (AKP), representing the 2nd electoral district of Istanbul Province.

On 16 December 2013, Şükür, known for his links to the Islamic Gülen movement of the Turkish cleric Fethullah Gülen, resigned from his position in protest after the interdiction of the group's "dershane" system, and decided to continue working as an independent MP. He subsequently went on to work as a football pundit for Turkish Radio and Television Corporation.

== Prosecution and exile ==
In February 2016, Şükür was charged with insulting president Recep Tayyip Erdoğan on Twitter. In August, after the 2016 Turkish coup attempt a warrant was issued for his arrest as he was charged with being a member of the Gülen movement, designated as a terrorist organization in Turkey since May 2016. In an interview published in May 2018 by The New York Times, Şükür stated that he left Turkey in September 2015 and moved to California to be with a friend. He mentioned that after his term as a member of parliament ended in 2015, he faced obstacles in every job he tried to pursue in Turkey, which led him to decide to live in the United States. He then called his wife and asked her to join him with their three children. After obtaining an investor EB-5 visa in the United States, he became a part-owner of a cafe in Palo Alto in 2016. He would later leave this job because "strange people kept coming into the bar". He noted that his long-term plan in the United States was not to run a cafe but to coach at a sports academy, similar to what he had planned to do in Turkey. In November 2019, he revealed in a video on his YouTube channel that he was working as an Uber driver. Germany's Welt am Sonntag, in an interview with Şükür, reported that he had closed his cafe to work as an Uber driver and was also selling books. Additionally, he mentioned that the Turkish government had seized his properties, businesses, and bank accounts in Turkey. On 3 April 2023, Şükür announced on his Twitter account that after seven-and-a-half years in the United States, he and his family had received their green cards, which would allow them to reside and work in the US. As of August 2023, Şükür has opened a boys' football school in Palo Alto.

On 1 December 2022, during the broadcast of a World Cup match between Canada and Morocco, by state-run Turkish Radio and Television Corporation (TRT), commentator Alper Bakırcıgil commented on Hakim Ziyech's goal in the fourth minute by mentioning Şükür, who scored the fastest goal in World Cup history at 10.8 seconds. He was removed from the broadcast at half-time and fired from his job later that day. News accounts speculated that his firing was due to TRT reacting to the mention of Şükür's name.

== Career statistics ==
=== Club ===
Appearances and goals by club, season and competition
Club	Season	League			Cup		Europe		Total	
Club	Season	Division	Apps	Goals	Apps	Goals	Apps	Goals	Apps	Goals
Sakaryaspor	1987–88	1.Lig	3	0	2	1	—		5	1
Sakaryaspor	1988–89	1.Lig	11	5			—		11	5
Sakaryaspor	1989–90	1.Lig	27	5			—		27	5
Sakaryaspor	Total		41	10	2	1	—		43	11
Bursaspor	1990–91	1.Lig	27	4			—		27	4
Bursaspor	1991–92	1.Lig	27	7	7	3	—		34	10
Bursaspor	Total		54	11	7	3	—		61	14
Galatasaray	1992–93	1.Lig	30	19	8	5	6	2	47	26
Galatasaray	1993–94	1.Lig	27	16	7	4	9	0	43	20
Galatasaray	1994–95	1.Lig	33	19	7	1	8	5	48	25
Galatasaray	Total		90	54	22	10	23	7	135	71
Torino	1995–96	Serie A	5	1	—		—		5	1
Galatasaray	1995–96	1.Lig	25	16	7	2	—		32	18
Galatasaray	1996–97	1.Lig	32	38	3	4	4	4	39	46
Galatasaray	1997–98	1.Lig	34	32	9	2	7	0	50	34
Galatasaray	1998–99	1.Lig	33	19	9	2	7	6	49	27
Galatasaray	1999–2000	1.Lig	32	14	5	1	17	10	54	25
Galatasaray	Total		156	119	33	15	35	20	224	152
Inter Milan	2000–01	Serie A	24	5	1	0	9	1	34	6
Parma	2001–02	Serie A	15	3	0	0	1	0	16	3
Blackburn Rovers	2002–03	Premier League	9	2	0	0	—		9	2
Galatasaray	2003–04	Süper Lig	28	12	1	0	9	6	38	18
Galatasaray	2004–05	Süper Lig	33	18	3	4	—		35	22
Galatasaray	2005–06	Süper Lig	31	10	4	2	2	1	37	13
Galatasaray	2006–07	Süper Lig	26	4	2	0	6	1	34	5
Galatasaray	2007–08	Süper Lig	28	11	4	1	9	2	41	14
Galatasaray	Total		146	55	14	7	26	10	186	72
Career total			540	260	79	34	94	38	709	332

=== International ===
Appearances and goals by national team and year
National team	Year	Apps	Goals
Turkey	1992	8	5
Turkey	1993	3	1
Turkey	1994	5	3
Turkey	1995	7	4
Turkey	1996	12	3
Turkey	1997	5	6
Turkey	1998	4	1
Turkey	1999	7	3
Turkey	2000	9	3
Turkey	2001	10	6
Turkey	2002	10	2
Turkey	2003	9	4
Turkey	2004	8	5
Turkey	2005	5	0
Turkey	2006	5	4
Turkey	2007	5	1
Total		112	51

== Honours ==
Sakaryaspor

- Turkish Cup: 1987–88

Bursaspor

- Prime Minister's Cup: 1992

Galatasaray

- Süper Lig: 1992–93, 1993–94, 1996–97, 1997–98, 1998–99, 1999–2000, 2005–06, 2007–08
- Turkish Cup: 1992–93, 1995–96, 1998–99, 1999–2000, 2004–05
- President Cup: 1993, 1996, 1997
- Prime Minister's Cup: 1995
- UEFA Cup: 1999–2000

Parma

- Coppa Italia: 2001–02

Turkey

- FIFA World Cup: third place 2002

Individual

- Turkish Footballer of the Year: 1996, 1997, 1998, 1999, 2000
- IFFHS World's Best Top Division Goal Scorer: 1997
- UEFA Jubilee Awards: Turkey's Golden Player 2004
- Top Scorer of Turkish League of all Times: 249 goals
- Top Scoring Turkish Player in Champions League: 22 goals
- Golden Foot Legends Award: 2014

== See also ==
- List of top international men's football goalscorers by country
- List of men's footballers with 100 or more international caps
- List of men's footballers with 50 or more international goals
- List of Galatasaray S.K. records and statistics
- List of foreign Serie A players

== Bibliography ==
- Sarıçiçek, Hasan (2006). Kral Hakan Şükür: Bir Kral'ın Entrikaları Alt Üst Eden Başarı Öyküsü (in Turkish). Biyografi.net Publications. ISBN 9789750039430.
- Tuncay, Bülent (2002). Galatasaray Tarihi: Avrupa Zaferleriyle Unutulmaz Yıldızlarıyla (in Turkish). Yapı Kredi Yayınları. ISBN 9750804546.

Sporting positions
Preceded by Bülent Korkmaz	Galatasaray captain 2005–2008	Succeeded by Ümit Karan
