= Nimani =

Nimani is a surname. Notable people with the surname include:

- Fadil Nimani (1967–2001), Kosovo Liberation Army commander
- Frédéric Nimani (born 1988), French footballer
- Fuad Nimani, Montenegrin-Albanian politician
- Shyqri Nimani (born 1941), Albanian graphic designer
- Zana Nimani (born 1961), Serbian singer of Kosovar-Albanian origin
- Valdan Nimani (born 1987), an Albanian football player
