= Turkey national football team =

Men's association football team

Turkey
- Nickname(s): Ay-Yıldızlılar (The Crescent-Stars); Bizim Çocuklar (Our Boys)
- Association: Turkish Football Federation (TFF)
- Confederation: UEFA (Europe)
- Head coach: Sergen Yalçın
- Captain: Hakan Çalhanoğlu
- Most caps: Rüştü Reçber (120)
- Top scorer: Hakan Şükür (51)
- Home stadium: Various
- FIFA code: TUR
| First colours | Second colours |

FIFA ranking
- Current: 33 ▼2 (18 November 2026)
- Highest: 5 (June 2004)
- Lowest: 67 (October 1993)

First international
- Turkey 2–2 Romania (Istanbul, Turkey; 26 October 1923) (Note: Since the Republic was not formally declared by the time of the event, the game was played between Romania and TFF. The city also was not consistently known as Istanbul in the English-speaking world until 1930.)

Biggest win
- Turkey 7–0 Syria (Ankara, Turkey; 20 November 1949); Turkey 7–0 South Korea (Geneva, Switzerland; 20 June 1954); Turkey 7–0 San Marino (Istanbul, Turkey; 10 November 1996)

Biggest defeat
- Poland 8–0 Turkey (Chorzów, Poland; 24 April 1968); Turkey 0–8 England (Istanbul, Turkey; 14 November 1984); England 8–0 Turkey (London, England; 14 October 1987)

World Cup
- Appearances: 3 (first in 1954)
- Best result: Third place (2002)

European Championship
- Appearances: 6 (first in 1996)
- Best result: Semi-finals (2008)

Olympic Games
- Appearances: 6 (first in 1924)
- Best result: Quarter-finals (1948, 1952)

Confederations Cup
- Appearances: 1 (first in 2003)
- Best result: Third place (2003)
Medal record
FIFA World Cup
| Bronze medal – third place | 2002 Korea and Japan | Team |
FIFA Confederations Cup
| Bronze medal – third place | 2003 France | Team |
- Website: tff.org

The Turkey national football team (Turkish: Türkiye millî futbol takımı), recognized as Türkiye by FIFA and UEFA, represent Turkey in men's international football matches. The team are controlled by the Turkish Football Federation (TFF), the governing body for football in Turkey, which was founded in 1923, and have been a member of FIFA since 1923 and UEFA since 1962.

The team played their first official international game in 1923 and have represented the nation in major competitions since their debut appearance at the 1924 Summer Olympics. They have participated in the Summer Olympics a total of six times (1924, 1928, 1936, 1948, 1952, and 1960) and reached the quarter-finals twice, in 1948 and 1952.

The team enjoyed their highest achievements in the 2000s, most notably finishing in third place at the 2002 FIFA World Cup and the 2003 FIFA Confederations Cup, and reaching the semi-finals at UEFA Euro 2008. They have qualified for the FIFA World Cup four times (1950, (Note: Turkey withdrew due to financial reasons.) 1954, 2002, and 2026) and reached the semi-finals in 2002, winning the bronze medal. The team qualified for the UEFA European Championship six times. Making their debut at Euro 1996, they reached the quarter-finals in Euro 2000 and the semi-finals in Euro 2008.

The country entered a resurgence in 2016, beginning with successful qualification campaigns for the Euro 2016, Euro 2020, and Euro 2024 championships, reaching the quarter-finals of the latter; and, after 24 years of absence, qualifying for the 2026 FIFA World Cup. The team were also promoted to League A, the top division of the UEFA Nations League, for the first time in their history in 2025. Despite entering the tournament with high expectations, Turkey underperformed and suffered early elimination in the group stage of the 2026 FIFA World Cup, but managed to defeat the United States in their final match.

In October 2023, Turkey was named as a co-host for UEFA Euro 2032 and will qualify automatically for the tournament.

== History ==
=== Early years ===
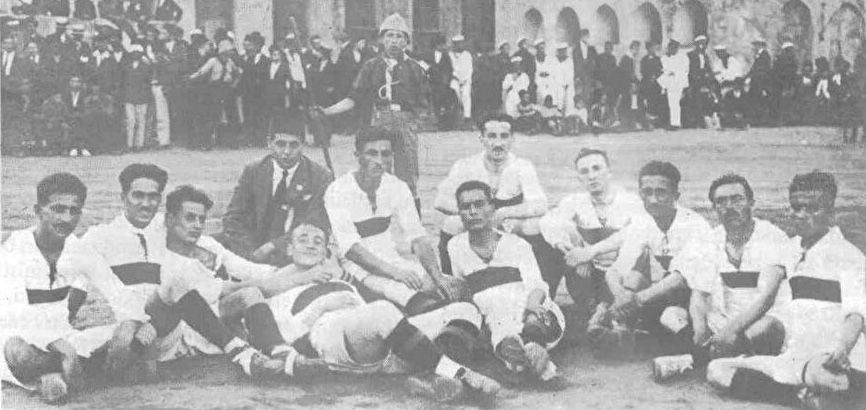
One of the early formations in 1922

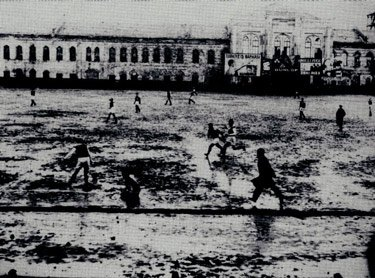
Türkiye against Romania in 1923

The Turkish national team's first game was against Romania, played on 26 October 1923 at Taksim Stadium in Istanbul, a 2–2 draw. Zeki Rıza Sporel is considered the first big star of Turkish football as he scored the first two goals against Romania. Turkey played their first ever official match at the 1924 Summer Olympics losing to Czechoslovakia 5–2. The first two goals in an official game were scored by Bekir Refet.

=== 1950s ===
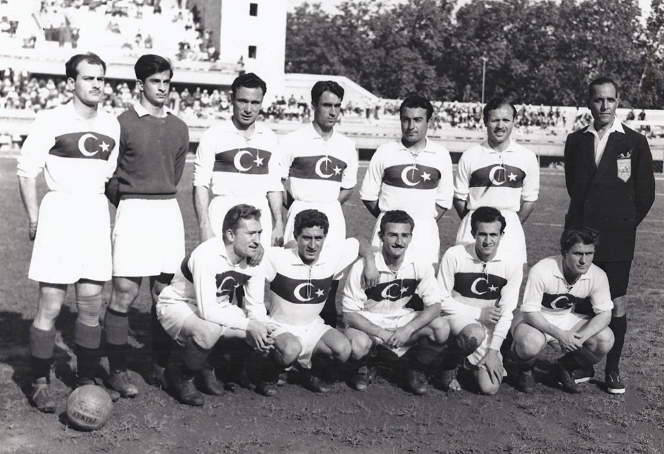
Turkey in 1950

Although Turkey qualified for the 1950 World Cup, beating Syria 7–0, they were forced to withdraw from the tournament due to financial problems.

Turkey then qualified for the 1954 World Cup after a play-off with Spain. They first lost 4–1 to Spain, but a 1–0 win a few days later initiated a replay (there was no clause for aggregate results in the rules at the time, which would have qualified Spain). On that occasion, they tied 2–2 after, booking their place after a coin toss. Turkey was grouped along with Hungary and West Germany. The Turks, however, never played Hungary due to the tournament format (Spain had been selected as a seeded team prior to the end of the qualification, and when Turkey qualified at their expense, they inherited the seed), and a 4–1 defeat by the Germans was followed by Turkey carrying out a 7–0 win over South Korea. Turkey lost the play-off game to West Germany 7–2.

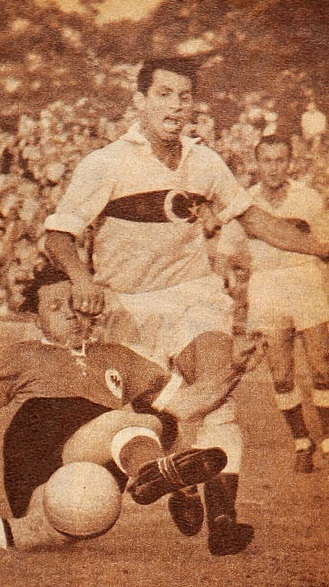
Turkey against West Germany at the 1954 World Cup

In 1956, however, Turkey did play Hungary in a friendly match in Istanbul, defeating what was one of the strongest teams of the era, 3–1. Lefter Küçükandonyadis, arguably one of the best Turkish strikers of all time, scored two goals during the tournament.

=== Near misses ===
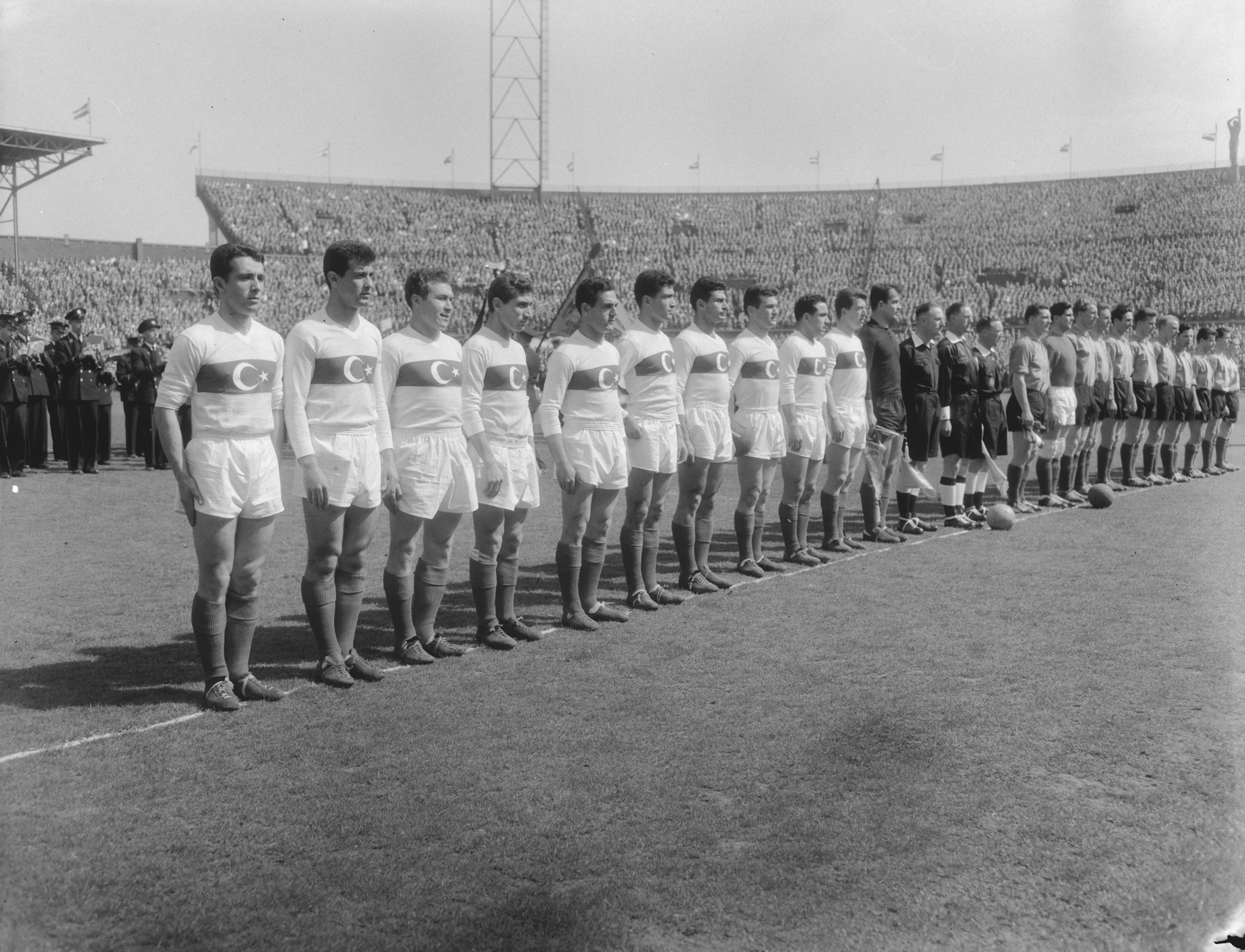
Turkey against Netherlands in 1958

Despite the introduction of a national league, and showings by Turkish clubs in European competition, the 1960s would be a barren time for the national team. Most players from the 1954 World Cup squad had already retired, and the new generation of players failed to qualify for a major tournament.

The 1970s saw Turkey holding back in the World Cup and UEFA European Championship qualifiers, but the team was a point too short to qualify for both UEFA Euro 1972 and Euro 1976.

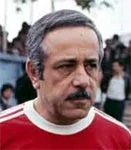
Coşkun Özarı coached Turkey in the 1970s and 1980s

In the 1980s the Turks also suffered one of their worst defeats with 8–0 scorelines twice against England. The Turks had suffered an 8–0 defeat before against Poland in 1968. But the 1990 World Cup qualifiers would mark a turning point for Turkish football, with Turkey only missing out on qualification in the final match. Prominent players in this period included Rıdvan Dilmen, Oğuz Çetin, Rıza Çalımbay, Feyyaz Uçar, and European Golden Boot winner Tanju Çolak.

=== 1990s ===
In 1990, coach Sepp Piontek was put in charge of the national team. Under his guidance, a group of new players debuted for the national team. Many of these players (which included Bülent Korkmaz, Alpay Özalan, Sergen Yalçın, Rüştü Reçber, and Hakan Şükür) would become the backbone of the national team for many years. Piontek's mission came to an end in 1993, when he was replaced by Fatih Terim, who in turn managed to qualify for Euro 1996. Turkey qualified for its first major tournament since 1954. The appointment of Piontek was a recommended move by another coach, Jupp Derwall, who had coached Galatasaray for three seasons.

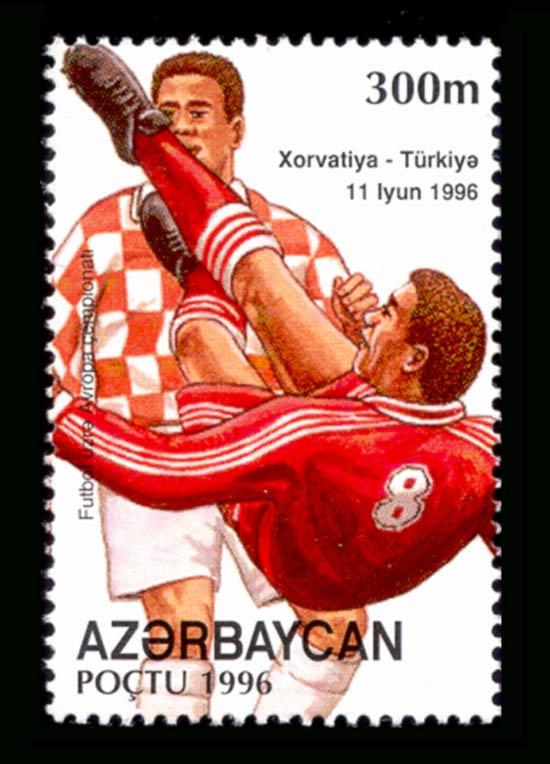
Turkish national football team on an Azerbaijan stamp for Euro 1996

Turkey qualified for Euro 1996, defeating both Switzerland and Sweden 2–1 during qualification. Despite a solid performance during the qualifiers, Turkey lost all their matches without scoring a single goal. They did, however, go home with an award: the fair play award, given to Özalan.

=== 2000s ===
Although Turkey failed to qualify for the 1998 World Cup, they qualified for Euro 2000 after winning a play-off against the Republic of Ireland. Turkey lost their first match 2–1 to Italy, then drew their second match against Sweden 0–0, and beat host nation Belgium 2–0, making it the first time in the history of the UEFA European Championship a host nation had been eliminated in the first round. This victory brought Turkey into the quarter-finals of the tournament, where they were beaten 2–0 by Portugal, with Arif Erdem missing a penalty.

Line-ups for the UEFA Euro 2000 game between Belgium and Turkey at the King Baudouin Stadium, Brussels on 19 June 2000

For the 2002 World Cup, Turkey finished second in their qualifying group, losing to Sweden in the match that would decide the number-one spot. The Turks were forced to play the play-offs against Austria. They defeated the Austrians 6–0 on aggregate and booked their place in the finals. The Turkish team started the 2002 World Cup with a 2–1 defeat against eventual winners Brazil. Turkey qualified from the group stage with a 3–0 win against China PR after drawing 1–1 with Costa Rica. Turkey then faced co-hosts Japan in the second round, winning 1–0. The Turkish team continued their run, as they beat Senegal 1–0 on a golden goal to book their place in the semi-finals, where a 1–0 defeat against eventual tournament winners Brazil forced them to play the third-place match. The Turks won the bronze medal after a 3–2 victory over co-hosts South Korea. Hakan Şükür scored Turkey's first goal in 10.8 seconds, despite the South Koreans kicking off first. It was the fastest goal in World Cup history. Tens of thousands of flag-waving Turkish fans greeted the World Cup squad on their return to Istanbul, where they joined a massive street party at Taksim Square. Rüştü Reçber, Alpay Özalan and Hasan Şaş were all included in the All-Star Team, with Reçber also being voted as the best goalkeeper in the UEFA Team of the Year 2002, while Şenol Güneş was being voted as the best manager.

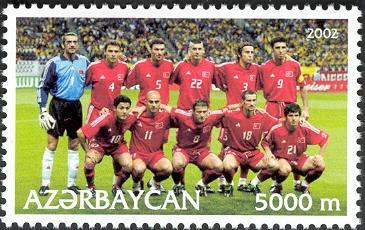
The Turkish national team on an Azerbaijani stamp for the 2002 FIFA World Cup

In 2003, Turkey finished third at the FIFA Confederations Cup. In the group stage, Turkey defeated the United States 2–1 before losing to Cameroon 1–0. In their final group match, Turkey drew 2–2 against Brazil, eliminating them from the tournament. Turkey lost to eventual tournament winners France 3–2 in the semi-finals, and then defeated Colombia 2–1 in the third-place match. Tuncay scored three goals and an assist, which won him the Silver Shoe Award and the Silver Ball Award for the second-best player of the tournament.

The Turks failed to qualify for Euro 2004 after Latvia won the qualification play-offs. They also missed out on the 2006 World Cup after failing to win the play-offs, this time on away goals against Switzerland, again after finishing second in their group.

Turkey qualified for their first international tournament in six years by finishing second behind Greece in Euro 2008 qualifying Group C to reach the tournament. They were placed alongside Switzerland, Portugal, and the Czech Republic in Group A. In their first match, they played Portugal and were beaten 2–0, but wins over Switzerland (2–1) and the Czech Republic (3–2) – both secured by late goals – meant qualification for the knockout stages. Turkey knocked out a host nation – Switzerland – in the group stages for the second time.

The quarter-final against Croatia was goalless after 90 minutes, and Croatia led 1–0 in the final minute of extra time, but another late Turkish goal by forward Semih Şentürk brought the game to penalties. The goal raised some controversy with Croatia fans and Croatia head coach Slaven Bilić, who claimed that the goal had been scored after extra time had elapsed. This complaint, however, was overruled, and the game went into penalties. Turkey defeated Croatia 3–1 on penalties.

Line-ups for the UEFA Euro 2008 match between Germany and Turkey on 25 June 2008 at St. Jakob-Park, Basel

Turkey went into the semi-final against Germany with just 14 outfield players available as a result of injuries and suspensions but scored first and were drawing 2–2. But they finished third by default after losing 3–2 with a last-minute goal by Philipp Lahm.

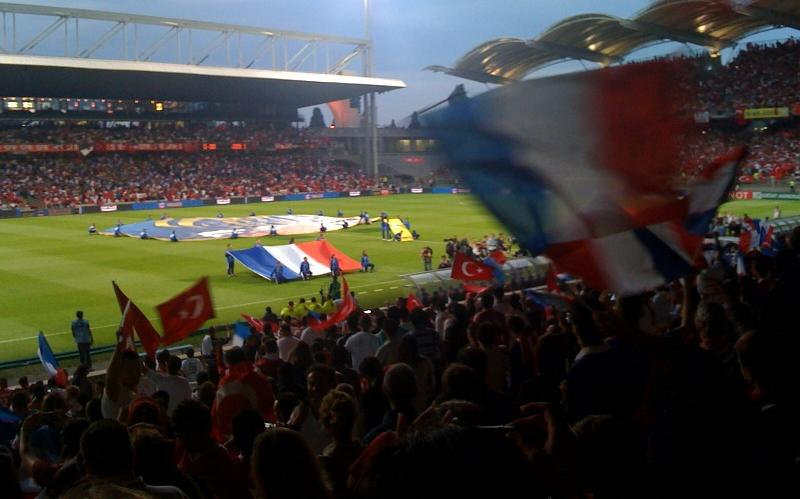
Turkey against France on 5 June 2009

=== 2010s ===
Turkey was drawn in UEFA Group 5 together with Armenia, Belgium, Bosnia and Herzegovina, Estonia and Spain. Turkey had a mixed qualifying campaign, finishing with 15 points and missing out on a play-off place to Bosnia and Herzegovina with 19 points. Spain topped the group to qualify, winning every game in the process. Coach Fatih Terim announced he would be resigning his post following their failure to qualify.

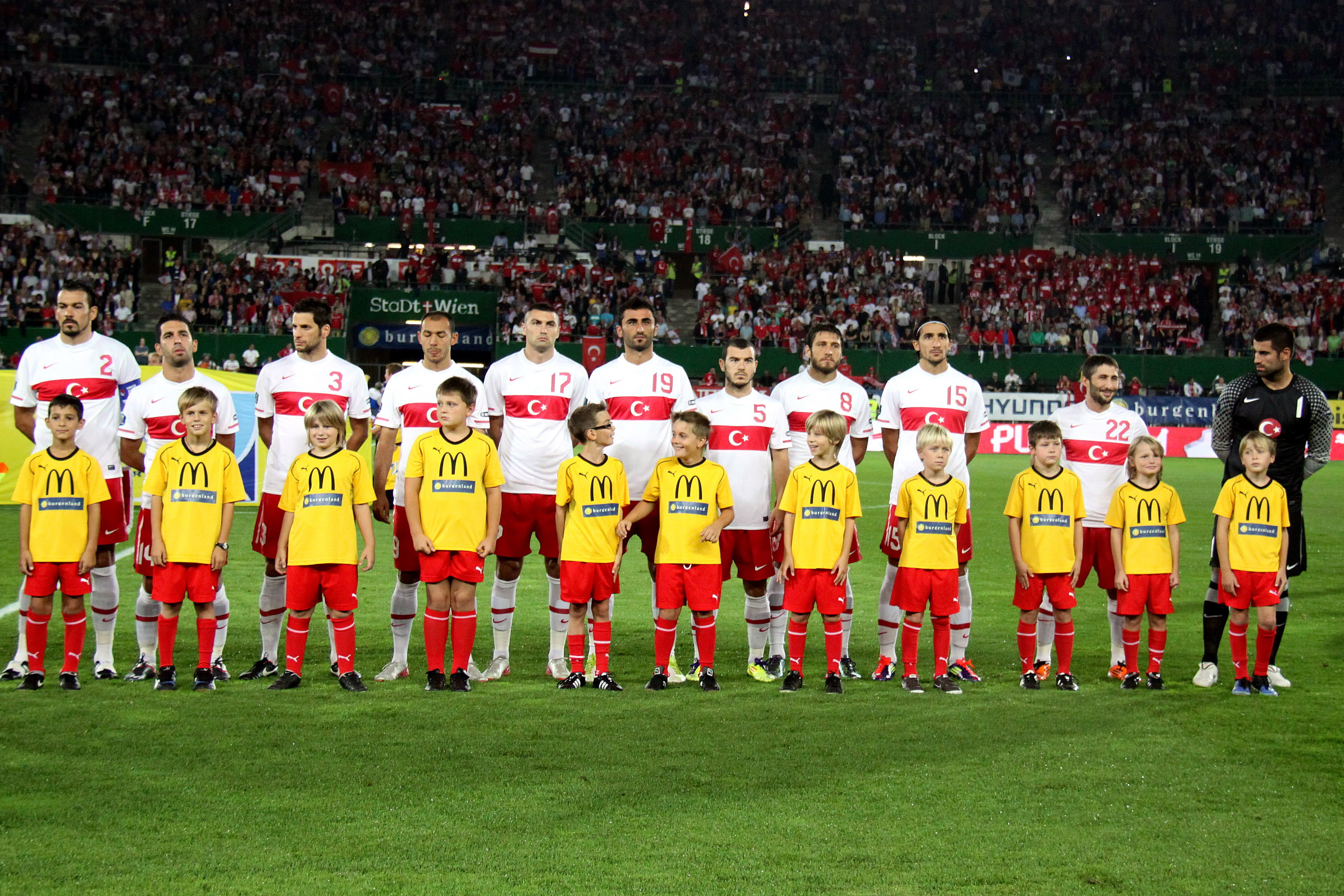
The Turks during Euro 2012 qualification

Turkey was drawn in Group A in qualification for Euro 2012, together with Kazakhstan, Austria, Belgium, Germany and Azerbaijan. The Turks reached the play-offs after beating Azerbaijan 1–0 but were eliminated 3–0 on aggregate by Croatia.

On 14 November 2012, Turkey celebrated their 500th match in a friendly game played against Denmark at the Türk Telekom Arena, Istanbul, which ended in a 1–1 draw. Before the match, footballers and coaches, who contributed to the national team's success in the past, were honored. Turkish pop singer Hadise, who wore a national team jersey with the number 500, performed a small concert.

Turkey was drawn in Group D in qualification for the 2014 World Cup, together with Andorra, Estonia, Hungary, the Netherlands and Romania, finishing fourth. Abdullah Avcı was sacked soon after. Fatih Terim was put in charge for the third time to lead the national team, but a 2–0 defeat against the Netherlands ended hopes of qualification.

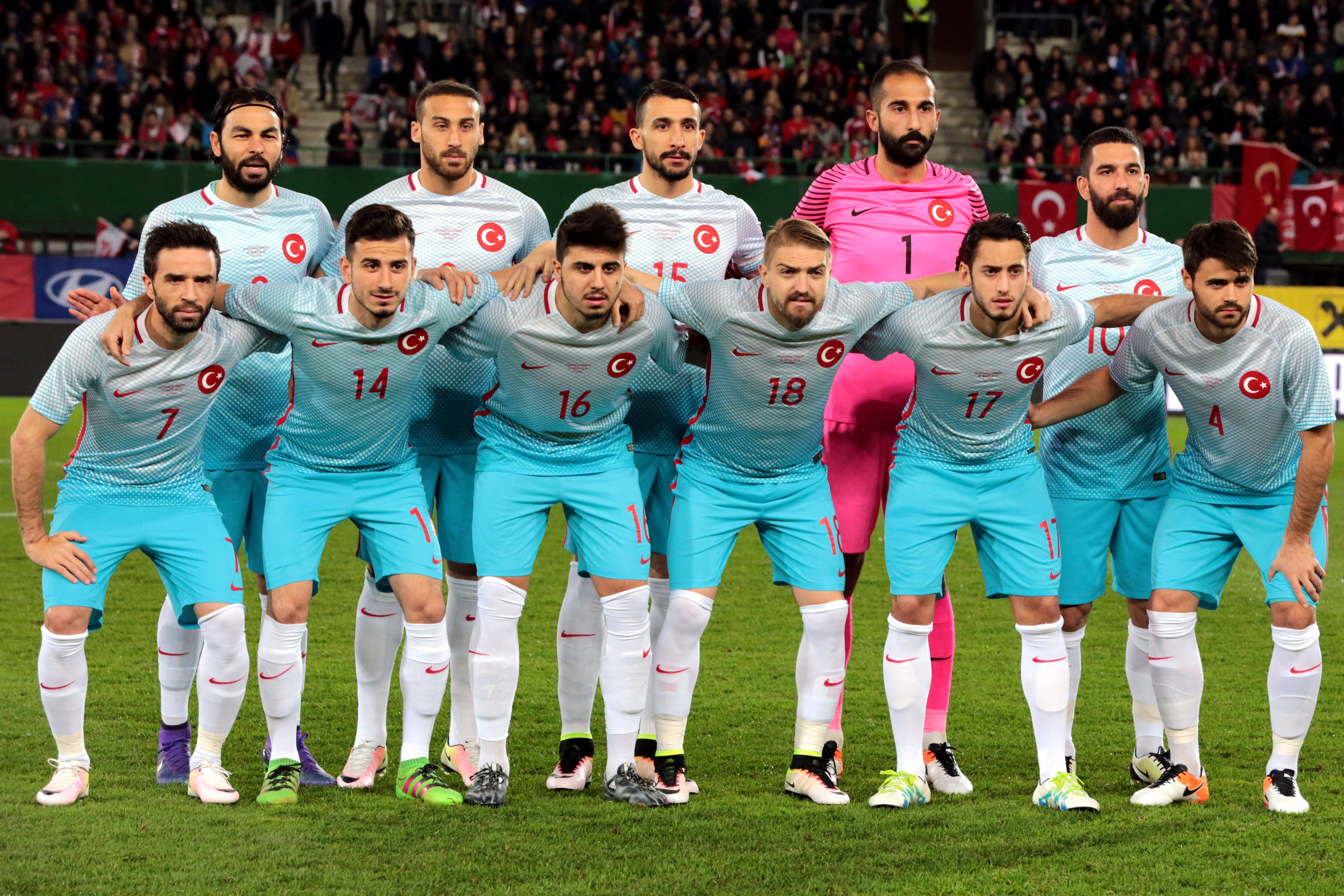
Turkey against Austria on 29 March 2016

Grouped in Group A in the qualification campaign for Euro 2016, with Iceland, Latvia, Kazakhstan, the Netherlands, and the Czech Republic, the team qualified for their first major tournament in eight years as the best third-placed team after beating Iceland 1–0, with Selçuk İnan netting a free kick in the 89th minute, along with Kazakhstan beating Latvia 1–0. After a year and a half of going unbeaten, a loss to England as a pre-tournament friendly ended the team's winning streak, subsequently leading to back-to-back losses against Croatia and Spain in the tournament. Turkey won their last game against the Czech Republic, 2–0. They nearly reached the last 16 until a late winner for Ireland against Italy meant that the latter instead qualified as one of the best third-placed teams.

Placed with Croatia, Finland, Iceland, Kosovo and Ukraine for 2018 World Cup qualifying, manager Fatih Terim left after an off-field incident, and 72-year-old former Romania manager Mircea Lucescu took over. After seven matches, Turkey were in pole position to qualify for the tournament, First, they boosted their World Cup hopes by beating Croatia 1–0, but a 3–0 defeat to Iceland at home ended automatic qualification hopes. After a 2–2 draw against Finland, the team finished fourth in Group I.

Turkey was drawn with Russia and Sweden in the 2018–19 UEFA Nations League B and performed poorly, leading to a bottom finish. In the first game at home against 2018 World Cup host and quarter-finalist Russia, Turkey lost 2–1. Turkey then put up its best performance in the League, winning 3–2 against Sweden on Swedish soil. However, Turkey could not extend their performances and lost to Russia in Sochi before suffering a humiliating 1–0 home loss to Sweden, thus initially relegating Turkey to League C. However, UEFA rule changes meant Turkey was allowed to remain in League B.

Turkey was drawn in Group H in the qualifying stages of Euro 2020 along with 2018 World Cup champions France, Iceland, Albania, Moldova, and Andorra. Veteran coach Şenol Güneş revolutionized the team, with many young talents, combining them with experienced players like Burak Yılmaz and Emre Belözoglu. The team eventually managed to achieve a 2–0 victory against France in Konya and a 1–1 draw at the Stade de France. Turkey then struggled against Andorra in their first match, winning after an 89th-minute goal at Vodafone Park in Istanbul. Turkey's only defeat in the group came against Iceland in Reykjavík, losing 2–1. The defeat came after the ill-treatment of the Turkish group at the Iceland customs, keeping them at the airport for three hours. This was followed by an Icelandic supporter holding a toilet brush to team captain Emre Belozoglu as a pretend microphone during an interview. The events were heavily criticized by the Turkish and European media. Turkey entered matchday nine as group leaders with 19 points. They and Iceland drew 0–0 at Turk Telekom Arena in Istanbul. After finishing behind France, a draw was enough to secure Turkey a spot in Euro 2020 finals, ahead of their away match against Andorra.

=== 2020s ===
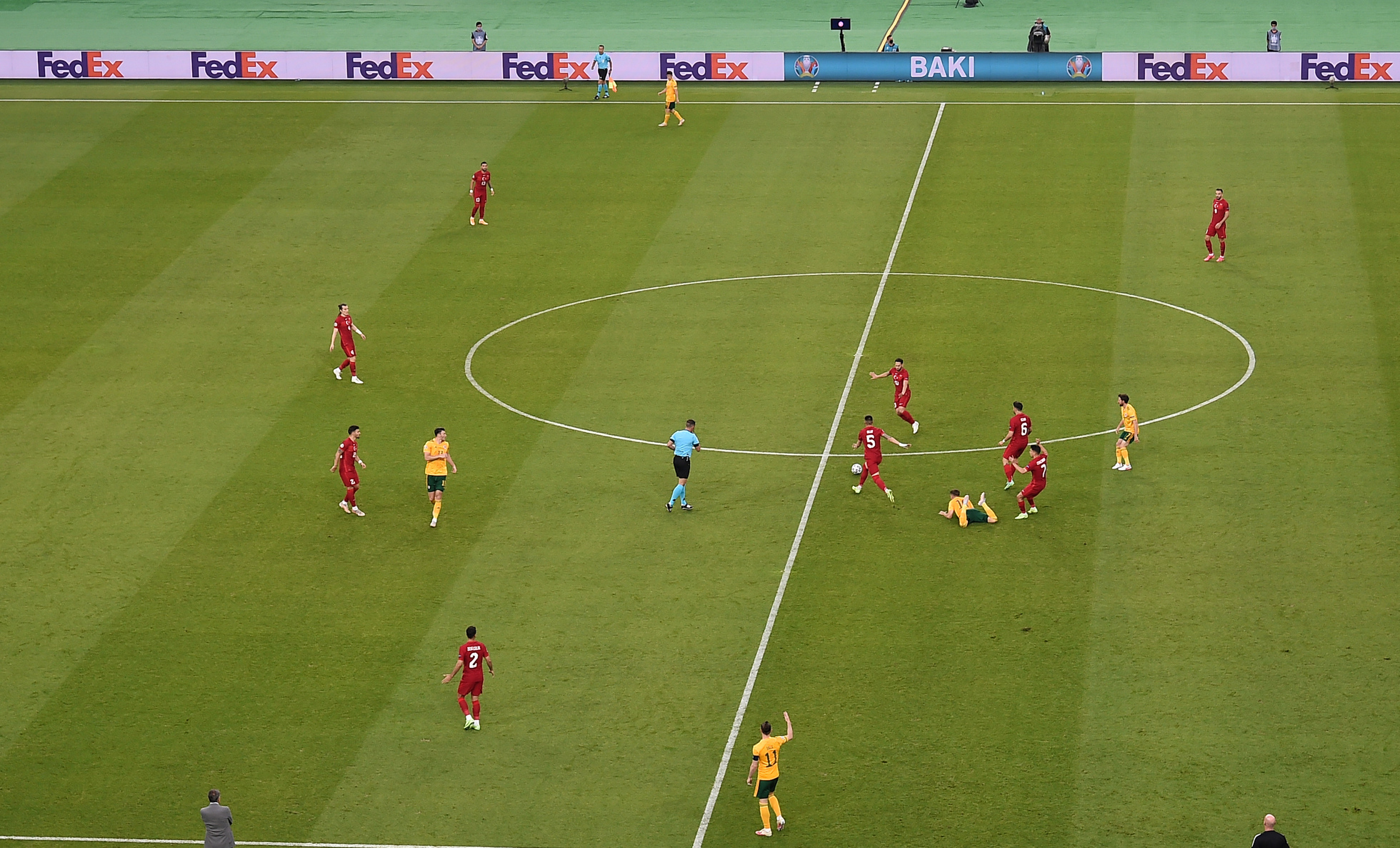
Turkey during the UEFA Euro 2020 group stage match against Wales in Baku

After qualifying for Euro 2020, which was postponed to June and July 2021 because of COVID-19, Turkey were drawn against Russia, alongside Hungary and Serbia, in the 2020–21 UEFA Nations League B. They performed poorly in their two opening games in September 2020. In the first game against Hungary at home, Turkey suffered a 1–0 defeat courtesy of a Dominik Szoboszlai goal from a free kick. Playing in Belgrade, following Aleksandar Kolarov's red card, the Turks were held goalless against Serbia. This hampered their chances of qualifying for League A, as their next opponents in October would be Russia—a team that Turkey haven't beaten since 1975—and Hungary.

In Moscow, Turkey drew 1–1 after Kenan Karaman's equalizer. The Turkish side then drew 2–2 against Serbia at home.

Against Russia, Denis Cheryshev scored for the Russians to take an early lead, making the Turkish side look hapless. But after Russia's red card reduced the side to ten men, the Turks eventually won 3–2. The Turks then traveled to Hungary with the hope that a win against the Hungarians could mean possible promotion, if Russia lost to Serbia. While Russia suffered a humiliating 5–0 defeat away in Belgrade, Turkey also lost 2–0 to the Hungarians. That meant Turkey and Serbia were tied on points, but Turkey were relegated after they lost the head-to-head away goals tiebreaker, 2–0. Such an outcome also meant Turkey would have to fight to get a direct Qatar 2022 ticket as play-off qualification appeared slim with their relegation, in which the 2022 World Cup qualifiers that started in March 2021.

Turkey had the honor of opening the Euro 2021 finals, but with Ciro Immobile and Lorenzo Insigne scoring, Turkey fell 3–0 to Italy. Roberto Mancini's side had been frustrated by Turkey's defensive approach in the first half but broke through in the 53rd minute when a hard-hit cross from Domenico Berardi flew in off Turkish defender Merih Demiral for an own goal. They went on to lose the next two games to both Switzerland and Wales, losing all three games alongside debutants North Macedonia.

In the 2022 World Cup qualifiers, Turkey was drawn into Group G with the Netherlands, Norway, Montenegro, Latvia, and Gibraltar. After they finished second in their group behind the Netherlands, they entered the 2022 FIFA World Cup UEFA playoffs against Portugal but lost 3–1 in a game in which Burak Yılmaz missed a crucial penalty to equalise, so Turkey failed to qualify for the 2022 FIFA World Cup. Afterwards, Yılmaz announced his international retirement.

In 2022–23 UEFA Nations League C, they were drawn in Group 1 with Luxembourg, the Faroe Islanders, Lithuania. They were promoted to League B after recording 13 points in six games. Their Nations League success not only rewarded them a playoff place should they fail to qualify directly, but also an easier draw in Group D with Croatia, Wales, Armenia, and Latvia. They subsequently qualified directly on 16 October 2023 and finished first on 19 November 2023.

Turkey took part in Euro 2024 Group F together with Portugal, Czech Republic and play-off winner Georgia and finished the group in 2nd place. The team reached the quarter-finals by beating Austria 2–1, then lost to the Netherlands 2–1 and finished the tournament in 5th place.

In 2024–25 UEFA Nations League B, they were drawn in Group 4 with Iceland, Montenegro, and Wales. Turkey finished second behind Wales following a 3–1 defeat to Montenegro in their final match. In the promotion play-offs against Hungary in March 2025, Turkey secured a 6–1 aggregate victory (3–1 and 3–0), earning promotion to League A for the first time and their first win over Hungary in 18 years.

In the 2026 World Cup qualifiers, Turkey was drawn into Group E alongside European champions Spain, Georgia, and Bulgaria. Despite earning a 2–2 away draw against Spain in their final group match in November 2025 and winning both home and away matches against Bulgaria and Georgia, Turkiye finished second due to an inferior goal difference, largely influenced by a 6–0 home defeat earlier in September, and thus advanced to the play-offs for the second consecutive time.

Drawn into Path C, Turkey defeated Romania 1–0 in the semi-finals in Istanbul on 26 March 2026, courtesy of a 53rd-minute goal by Ferdi Kadıoğlu. In the final, played away against Kosovo in Pristina on 31 March, Turkey secured a 1–0 victory through a 53rd-minute strike by Kerem Aktürkoğlu, qualifying for the 2026 FIFA World Cup, their first appearance in 24 years.

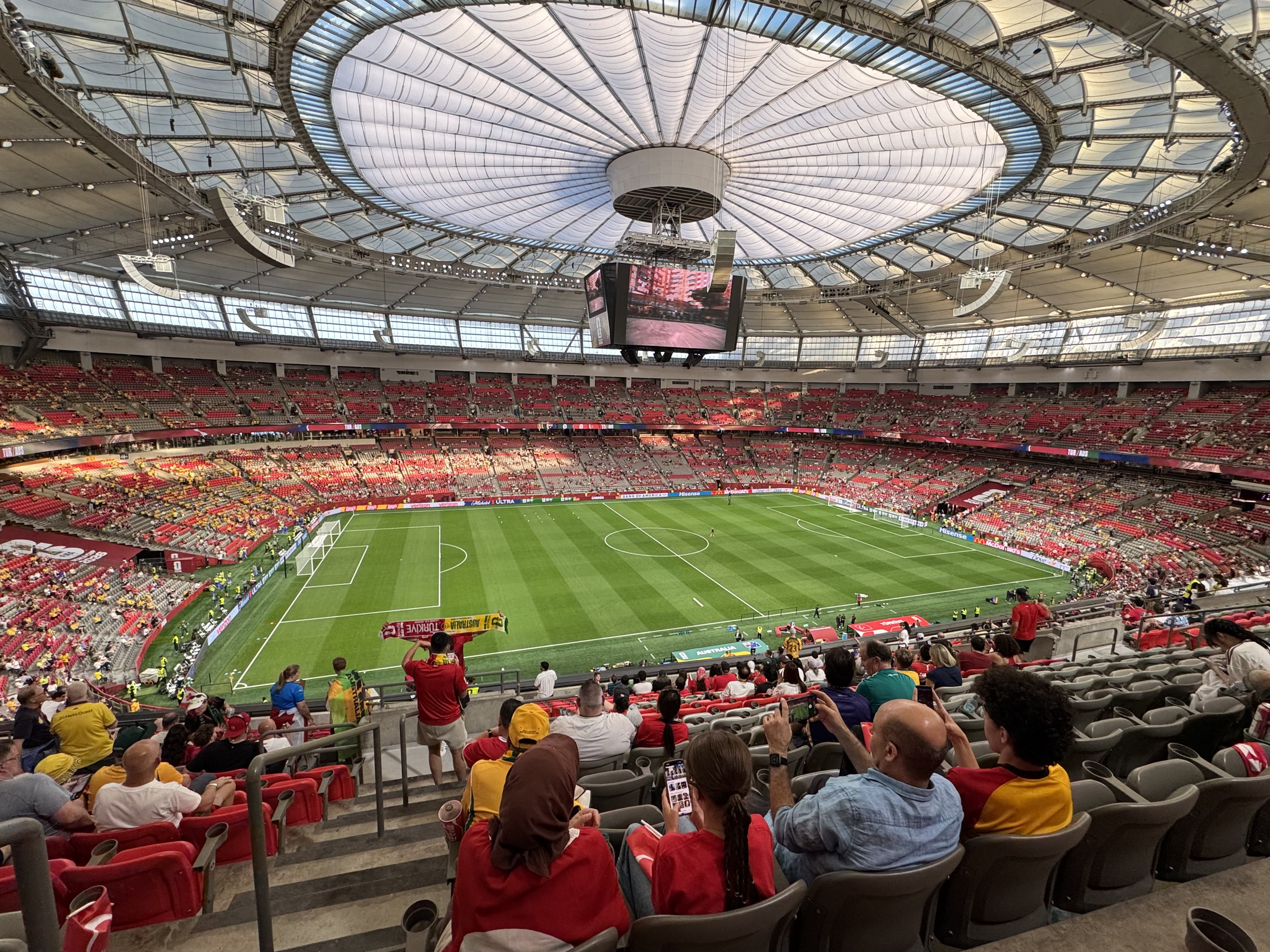
Australia vs. Turkey match in Vancouver, Canada (2026 FIFA World Cup)

At the 2026 FIFA World Cup, Turkey was in Group D (along with the USA (co-hosts), Australia and Paraguay) and was the second nation in the World Cup to be eliminated after Haiti; losing 2–0 to Australia in the opening match and then losing 1–0 to a 10-man Paraguay. Turkey had 62 shots in the first 2 games, scoring 0 goals. The team earned a late 3–2 victory in their final group match against co-hosts and group winners United States, but finished bottom of their group with three points.

In the 2026–27 UEFA Nations League A, Turkey was drawn in Group 1 alongside France, Italy and Belgium, marking its first participation in League A. Returning to the tournament 92 days after their exit from the 2026 FIFA World Cup, Turkey began its campaign with a 1–0 home defeat to Zinedine Zidane's France and a 4–1 home defeat to Roberto Mancini's Italy, followed by a 3–0 away defeat to Belgium and a 3–1 away defeat to Italy. The four consecutive losses marked the national team's worst run in competitive matches in 38 years and left it at risk of direct relegation to League B for the 2028–29 season. On 9 October 2026, the TFF announced that it had parted ways with head coach Vincenzo Montella, ending his three-year tenure with the national team.

=== 2030s ===
Turkey is set to take part of the UEFA Euro 2032 having automatically qualified as co-host in October 2023 along with Italy who also automatically qualified as co-host.

== Kit suppliers ==
First kit of Turkey (1922)

Turkey's kit colors were home red kits and white away kits, manufactured by Adidas, from 1983 to 2002. Nike became the manufacturer in 2003. 17 years later, they switched their kit colors to white as the home kit and red as the away kit until 2026 (ahead of the upcoming World Cup qualifying play-offs) when red became the home kit and white became the away kit again.

| Kit provider | Period |
|---|---|
| (Germany) Adidas | 1983−2002 |
| (United States) Nike | 2003−2026 |
| (Germany) Adidas | 2027−present |

== Rivalries ==
Turkey has developed several notable rivalries, the most well-known being Croatia and Greece.

Turkey and Croatia have played each other nine times, with their first encounter at Euro 1996; where both countries made their debuts in the opening match, which Croatia won 1–0. In Euro 2008, Turkey won on penalties after a 1–1 deadlock. The two teams faced each other in the 2012 Euro qualifying play-offs, with Croatia winning 3–0 in the first-leg in Istanbul, and advancing to the tournament finals following a 0–0 draw in the second-leg. The two teams faced each other once again in a European competition at Euro 2016, playing in the opening match of Group D, with Croatia winning 1–0. Only three months after the Euros, the two teams played in their opening match in Group I of 2018 FIFA World Cup qualifying, which finished 1–1. Exactly one year later, Turkey won the reverse fixture 1–0 at home, which played a key part in both countries' qualifying campaigns, although Turkey would not qualify for the World Cup while Croatia would finish runners-up behind France. Turkey and Croatia would again face each other during the UEFA Euro 2024 qualifying campaign, where Turkey managed to shock Croatia with a 1–0 win away as the Turks managed to top the table of a qualification group for the first time in their history, whereas Croatia, despite a 2–0 away win earlier to Turkey, had struggled with a rather poor performance and only managed to qualify at the last hurdle.

Turkey also has a historical rivalry with Greece. Playing 14 times, Turkey won eight matches, drew thrice, and lost only three games. Both countries have been described as "punching above their weight", with Greece winning Euro 2004 after being classified as underdogs before the competition, and Turkey advancing to the semi-finals of Euro 2008, where they were knocked out by Germany. Due to tension between the two countries and the dispute over Cyprus, coupled with several incidents occurring during matches between Turkish and Greek clubs, it has been described as one of the biggest international football rivalries.

== Results and fixtures ==
The following is a list of Turkey's match results in the last twelve months, as well as any future matches that have been scheduled.

Win Draw Loss Fixture

=== 2026 ===
| 26 March 2026 World Cup qualification play-offs | Turkey | 1–0 | Romania | Istanbul, Turkey |
| 20:00 TRT (UTC+03:00) | Kadıoğlu 53' | Report | | Stadium: Beşiktaş Stadium; Attendance: 38,979; Referee: François Letexier (France) |

| 31 March 2026 World Cup qualification play-offs | Kosovo | 0–1 | Turkey | Pristina, Kosovo |
| 20:45 CEST (UTC+02:00) | | Report | Aktürkoğlu 53' | Stadium: Fadil Vokrri Stadium; Attendance: 12,887; Referee: Michael Oliver (England) |

| 1 June Friendly | Turkey | 4–0 | North Macedonia | Istanbul, Turkey |
| 20:30 TRT (UTC+03:00) | Kökçü 2'; Uzun 16'; Gül 53'; Yılmaz 70' | Report | | Stadium: Şükrü Saracoğlu Stadium; Attendance: 33,994; Referee: José Luis Munuera Montero (Spain) |

| 6 June Friendly | Turkey | 2–1 | Venezuela | Fort Lauderdale, Florida, United States |
| 18:00 EDT (UTC−04:00) | Yılmaz 44'; Akgün 54' | Report | Mendoza 13' | Stadium: Inter Miami CF Stadium; Attendance: 14,000; Referee: Daniel Quintero (Mexico) |

| 13 June 2026 FIFA World Cup Group D | Australia | 2–0 | Turkey | Vancouver, British Columbia, Canada |
| 21:00 PDT (UTC−07:00) | Irankunda 27'; Metcalfe 75' | Report | | Stadium: BC Place; Attendance: 52,497; Referee: Jesús Valenzuela (Venezuela) |

| 19 June 2026 FIFA World Cup Group D | Turkey | 0–1 | Paraguay | Santa Clara, California, United States |
| 20:00 PDT (UTC−07:00) | | Report | Galarza 2' | Stadium: Levi's Stadium; Attendance: 68,827; Referee: Iván Barton (El Salvador) |

| 25 June 2026 FIFA World Cup Group D | Turkey | 3–2 | United States | Inglewood, California, United States |
| 19:00 PDT (UTC−07:00) | Güler 10'; Yılmaz 31'; Ayhan 90+8' | Report | Trusty 3'; Berhalter 49' | Stadium: SoFi Stadium; Attendance: 70,492; Referee: Mustapha Ghorbal (Algeria) |

| 25 September 2026–27 UEFA Nations League A | Turkey | 0–1 | France | İzmit, Turkey |
| 21:45 TRT (UTC+03:00) | | Report | Mbappé 54' | Stadium: Kocaeli Stadium; Attendance: 28,205; Referee: Felix Zwayer (Germany) |

| 28 September 2026–27 UEFA Nations League A | Turkey | 1–4 | Italy | Bursa, Turkey |
| 21:45 TRT (UTC+03:00) | Yılmaz 47' | Report | Bastoni 9'; Frattesi 22'; Kayode 27'; P. Esposito 50' | Stadium: Centennial Atatürk Stadium; Attendance: 33,891; Referee: Michael Oliver (England) |

| 2 October 2026–27 UEFA Nations League A | Belgium | 3–0 | Turkey | Liège, Belgium |
| 20:45 CEST (UTC+02:00) | De Bruyne 10', 60'; Lukaku 76' | Report | | Stadium: Stade Maurice Dufrasne; Attendance: 24,386; Referee: Rohit Saggi (Norway) |

| 5 October 2026–27 UEFA Nations League A | Italy | 3–1 | Turkey | Bologna, Italy |
| 20:45 CEST (UTC+02:00) | Scamacca 26'; Calafiori 65'; P. Esposito 87' | Report | Şimşir 61' | Stadium: Stadio Renato Dall'Ara; Attendance: 30,040; Referee: Szymon Marciniak (Poland) |

| 12 November 2026–27 UEFA Nations League A | Turkey | 1–2 | Belgium | İzmir, Turkey |
| 20:00 TRT (UTC+03:00) | Güler 20' | Report | De Bruyne 27'; De Ketelaere 30' | Stadium: Gürsel Aksel Stadium; Attendance: 19,697; Referee: Sandro Schärer (Switzerland) |

| 15 November 2026–27 UEFA Nations League A | France | 2–1 | Turkey | Bordeaux, France |
| 20:45 CET (UTC+01:00) | Topçu 49' (o.g.); Kroupi 80' | Report | Bardakcı 90' | Stadium: Stade Atlantique; Attendance: 40,033; Referee: Chris Kavanagh (England) |

== Coaching staff ==
As of 22 October 2026

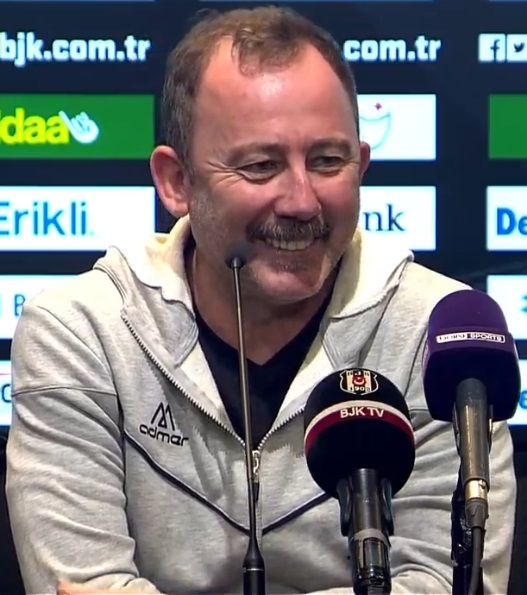
Sergen Yalçın, the current head coach of Turkey national football team.

| Position | Name |
|---|---|
| Head coach | (Turkey) Sergen Yalçın |
Assistant coach
| Assistant coach | (Turkey) Murat Kaytaz |
| Goalkeeping coach | (Turkey) Erol Ayçiçek |
Fitness coaches
| Fitness coaches | (Turkey) Niyazi Eniseler |
| Fitness coaches | (Turkey) Emre Gürbüz |
| Match analysts | (Turkey) Tarık Yiğit Egeli |
| Match analysts | (Turkey) Okan Aydıner |
| Match analysts | (Turkey) Muhammet Nuri Püren |
| Team manager | (Turkey) Serhat Mert |

== Players ==
=== Current squad ===
The following players were called up for the UEFA Nations League matches against Belgium and France on 12 and 15 November 2026, respectively.
Caps and goals are correct as of 19 November 2026, after the match against France.

| No. | Pos. | Player | Date of birth (age) | Caps | Goals | Club |
|---|---|---|---|---|---|---|
| 1 | GK | Berke Özer | 25 May 2000 (age 26) | 3 | 0 | (French Football Federation) Lille |
| 12 | GK | Ersin Destanoğlu | 1 January 2001 (age 25) | 0 | 0 | (United Arab Emirates Football Association) Al Jazira |
| 23 | GK | Serhat Öztaşdelen | 9 December 2004 (age 21) | 0 | 0 | (Turkish Football Federation) Kocaelispor |
| | GK | Uğurcan Çakır | 5 April 1996 (age 30) | 46 | 0 | (Turkish Football Federation) Galatasaray |
| 3 | DF | Merih Demiral | 5 March 1998 (age 28) | 70 | 6 | (Saudi Arabian Football Federation) Al-Ahli |
| 4 | DF | Emirhan Topçu | 11 October 2000 (age 26) | 3 | 0 | (Turkish Football Federation) Beşiktaş |
| 13 | DF | Eren Elmalı | 7 July 2000 (age 26) | 29 | 0 | (Turkish Football Federation) Galatasaray |
| 14 | DF | Abdülkerim Bardakcı | 7 September 1994 (age 32) | 35 | 3 | (Turkish Football Federation) Galatasaray |
| 15 | DF | Ahmetcan Kaplan | 16 January 2003 (age 23) | 0 | 0 | (Royal Dutch Football Association) NEC |
| 20 | DF | Ferdi Kadıoğlu | 7 October 1999 (age 27) | 37 | 2 | (The Football Association) Brighton & Hove Albion |
| 22 | DF | Mustafa Eskihellaç | 5 May 1997 (age 29) | 3 | 0 | (Turkish Football Federation) Trabzonspor |
| | DF | Ozan Kabak | 25 March 2000 (age 26) | 34 | 2 | (German Football Association) TSG Hoffenheim |
| | DF | Zeki Çelik | 17 February 1997 (age 29) | 68 | 3 | (Italian Football Federation) Juventus |
| 5 | MF | Salih Özcan | 11 January 1998 (age 28) | 38 | 1 | (Turkish Football Federation) Beşiktaş |
| 6 | MF | Orkun Kökçü | 29 December 2000 (age 25) | 56 | 4 | (Turkish Football Federation) Beşiktaş |
| 10 | MF | Hakan Çalhanoğlu | 8 February 1994 (age 32) | 110 | 22 | (Italian Football Federation) Inter Milan |
| 16 | MF | İsmail Yüksek | 26 January 1999 (age 27) | 40 | 1 | (Turkish Football Federation) Fenerbahçe |
| 7 | FW | İlhan Fakılı | 20 January 2006 (age 20) | 2 | 0 | (Turkish Football Federation) Beşiktaş |
| 8 | FW | Arda Güler | 25 February 2005 (age 21) | 38 | 8 | (Royal Spanish Football Federation) Real Madrid |
| 9 | FW | Enes Ünal | 10 May 1997 (age 29) | 35 | 3 | (Royal Spanish Football Federation) Getafe |
| 11 | FW | Can Uzun | 11 November 2005 (age 21) | 12 | 1 | (German Football Association) Eintracht Frankfurt |
| 17 | FW | Yunus Akgün | 7 July 2000 (age 26) | 25 | 4 | (Turkish Football Federation) Galatasaray |
| 18 | FW | Oğuz Aydın | 27 October 2000 (age 26) | 18 | 0 | (Turkish Football Federation) Fenerbahçe |
| 19 | FW | Deniz Gül | 2 July 2004 (age 22) | 16 | 2 | (Turkish Football Federation) Galatasaray |
| 21 | FW | Barış Yılmaz | 23 May 2000 (age 26) | 43 | 6 | (Turkish Football Federation) Galatasaray |
| | FW | Aral Şimşir | 19 June 2002 (age 24) | 2 | 1 | (Turkish Football Federation) Trabzonspor |

=== Recent call-ups ===
The following players have also been called up to the team within the last twelve months.

| Pos. | Player | Date of birth (age) | Caps | Goals | Club | Latest call-up |
|---|---|---|---|---|---|---|
| GK | Altay Bayındır | 14 April 1998 (age 28) | 14 | 0 | (Spain) Celta Vigo | v. Italy, 5 October 2026 |
| GK | Muhammed Şengezer | 5 January 1997 (age 29) | 1 | 0 | (Turkey) Başakşehir | v. Italy, 5 October 2026 |
| GK | Okan Kocuk | 27 July 1995 (age 31) | 0 | 0 | (Turkey) Samsunspor | v. Italy, 5 October 2026 |
| GK | Mert Günok | 1 March 1989 (age 37) | 37 | 0 | (Turkey) Fenerbahçe | 2026 FIFA World Cup |
| DF | Samet Akaydin | 13 March 1994 (age 32) | 19 | 1 | (Turkey) Trabzonspor | v. Italy, 5 October 2026 |
| DF | Yusuf Akçiçek | 25 January 2006 (age 20) | 3 | 0 | (Saudi Arabia) Al-Hilal | v. Italy, 5 October 2026 |
| DF | Adil Demirbağ | 10 December 1997 (age 28) | 0 | 0 | (Turkey) Konyaspor | v. Italy, 5 October 2026 |
| DF | Kaan Ayhan | 10 November 1994 (age 32) | 74 | 6 | (Turkey) Galatasaray | 2026 FIFA World Cup |
| DF | Çağlar Söyüncü | 23 May 1996 (age 30) | 61 | 2 | (Turkey) Çorum | 2026 FIFA World Cup |
| DF | Mert Müldür | 3 April 1999 (age 27) | 48 | 3 | (Turkey) Fenerbahçe | 2026 FIFA World Cup ^{INJ} |
| DF | Yasin Özcan | 20 April 2006 (age 20) | 1 | 0 | (Turkey) Beşiktaş | v. Romania, 26 March 2026 ^{TRA} |
| DF | Yiğit Demir | 2 August 2004 (age 22) | 0 | 0 | (Turkey) Fenerbahçe | v. Romania, 26 March 2026 ^{TRA} |
| DF | Hamza Güreler | 10 April 2006 (age 20) | 0 | 0 | (Turkey) Başakşehir | v. Romania, 26 March 2026 ^{TRA} |
| MF | Demir Tıknaz | 17 August 2004 (age 22) | 4 | 0 | (Portugal) Braga | v. Italy, 5 October 2026 |
| MF | Bartuğ Elmaz | 19 February 2003 (age 23) | 2 | 0 | (Turkey) Fenerbahçe | v. Italy, 5 October 2026 |
| MF | Melih Kabasakal | 18 February 1996 (age 30) | 1 | 0 | (Turkey) Trabzonspor | v. Italy, 5 October 2026 |
| MF | Emirhan İlkhan | 1 June 2004 (age 22) | 0 | 0 | (Italy) Torino | v. Italy, 5 October 2026 |
| MF | Atakan Karazor | 13 October 1996 (age 30) | 2 | 0 | (Germany) VfB Stuttgart | 2026 FIFA World Cup ^{PRE} |
| MF | Eyüp Aydın | 2 August 2005 (age 21) | 0 | 0 | (Turkey) Galatasaray | v. Romania, 26 March 2026 ^{TRA} |
| MF | Baran Gezek | 26 August 2005 (age 21) | 0 | 0 | (Turkey) Kayserispor | v. Romania, 26 March 2026 ^{TRA} |
| MF | Barış Kalaycı | 30 August 2005 (age 21) | 0 | 0 | (Turkey) Fatih Karagümrük | v. Romania, 26 March 2026 ^{TRA} |
| FW | Kenan Yıldız | 4 May 2005 (age 21) | 31 | 5 | (Italy) Juventus | 2026 FIFA World Cup ^{INJ} |
| FW | Yusuf Sarı | 20 November 1998 (age 28) | 6 | 1 | (Turkey) Başakşehir | 2026 FIFA World Cup ^{PRE} |
| FW | Kerem Aktürkoğlu | 21 October 1998 (age 28) | 58 | 15 | (Turkey) Fenerbahçe | v. Italy, 5 October 2026 |
| FW | İrfan Kahveci | 15 July 1995 (age 31) | 49 | 6 | (Turkey) Fenerbahçe | v. Italy, 5 October 2026 |
| FW | Semih Kılıçsoy | 15 August 2005 (age 21) | 4 | 0 | (Turkey) Beşiktaş | v. Kosovo, 31 March 2026 |
Notes: ^{PRE} = Preliminary squad/standby.; ^{INJ} = Not part of the current squad due to injury.; ^{SUS} = Player is suspended.; ^{RET} = Retired from international football.; ^{TRA} = Player included for training purposes only.

== Player records ==
As of 15 November 2026
Players in bold are still active with the Turkey national team.

=== Most appearances ===
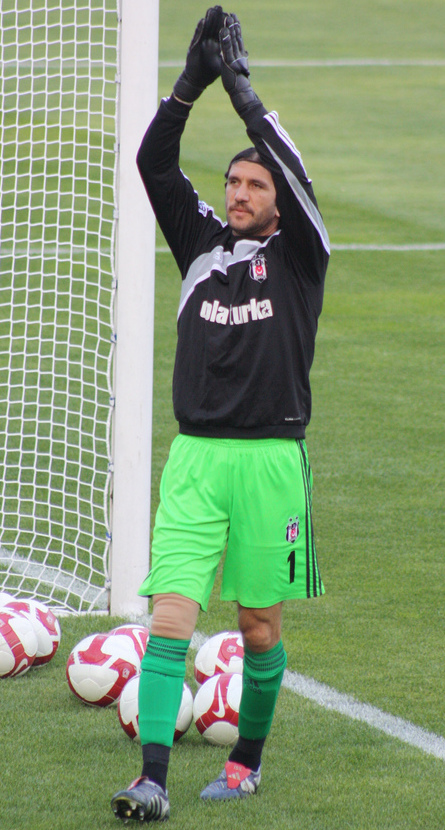
Rüştü Reçber is Turkey's most-capped player with 120 appearances.

| Rank | Player | Caps | Goals | Career |
|---|---|---|---|---|
| 1 | Rüştü Reçber | 120 | 0 | 1994–2012 |
| 2 | Hakan Şükür | 112 | 51 | 1992–2007 |
| 3 | **Hakan Çalhanoğlu** | 110 | 22 | 2013–present |
| 4 | Bülent Korkmaz | 102 | 2 | 1990–2005 |
| 5 | Emre Belözoğlu | 101 | 9 | 2000–2019 |
| 6 | Arda Turan | 100 | 16 | 2006–2017 |
| 7 | Tugay Kerimoğlu | 94 | 2 | 1990–2007 |
| 8 | Alpay Özalan | 90 | 4 | 1995–2005 |
| 9 | Hamit Altıntop | 82 | 7 | 2004–2014 |
| 10 | Mehmet Topal | 81 | 2 | 2008–2018 |

=== Top goalscorers ===
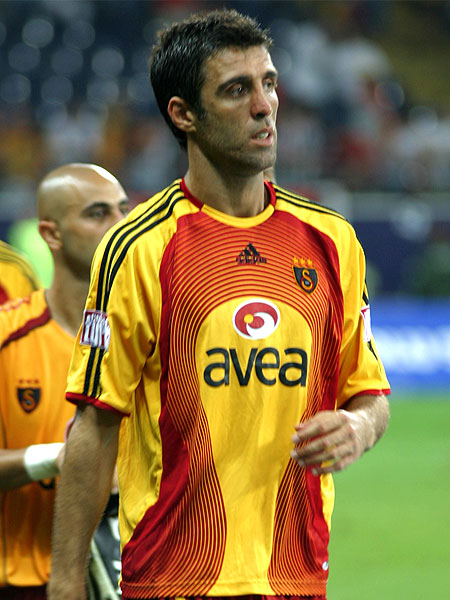
Hakan Şükür is Turkey's top scorer with 51 goals.

| Rank | Player | Goals | Caps | Ratio | Career |
|---|---|---|---|---|---|
| 1 | Hakan Şükür | 51 | 112 | 0.46 | 1992–2007 |
| 2 | Burak Yılmaz | 31 | 77 | 0.4 | 2006–2022 |
| 3 | Tuncay Şanlı | 22 | 80 | 0.28 | 2002–2010 |
| 3 | **Hakan Çalhanoğlu** | 22 | 110 | 0.2 | 2013–present |
| 5 | Lefter Küçükandonyadis | 21 | 46 | 0.46 | 1948–1963 |
| 5 | Cenk Tosun | 21 | 53 | 0.4 | 2013–2024 |
| 7 | Metin Oktay | 19 | 36 | 0.53 | 1955–1968 |
| 7 | Cemil Turan | 19 | 44 | 0.43 | 1969–1979 |
| 7 | Nihat Kahveci | 19 | 69 | 0.28 | 2000–2010 |
| 10 | Cengiz Ünder | 16 | 51 | 0.31 | 2016–2023 |
| 10 | Arda Turan | 16 | 100 | 0.16 | 2006–2017 |

=== Most clean sheets ===
| Rank | Player | Clean sheets | Caps | Ratio | Career |
|---|---|---|---|---|---|
| 1 | Rüştü Reçber | 53 | 120 | 0.44 | 1994–2012 |
| 2 | Volkan Demirel | 20 | 63 | 0.32 | 2004–2014 |
| 3 | Turgay Şeren | 16 | 46 | 0.35 | 1950–1966 |
| 4 | Volkan Babacan | 15 | 35 | 0.43 | 2014–2018 |
| 5 | **Mert Günok** | 14 | 37 | 0.38 | 2012–present |
| 5 | **Uğurcan Çakır** | 14 | 45 | 0.31 | 2019–present |
| 7 | Engin İpekoğlu | 10 | 32 | 0.31 | 1989–1999 |
| 8 | Ömer Çatkıç | 8 | 19 | 0.42 | 2000–2005 |
| 9 | Ali Artuner | 7 | 25 | 0.28 | 1965–1971 |
| 10 | Sabri Dino | 6 | 12 | 0.5 | 1969–1975 |
| 10 | Sinan Bolat | 6 | 12 | 0.5 | 2011–2019 |

=== Centuriate goals ===
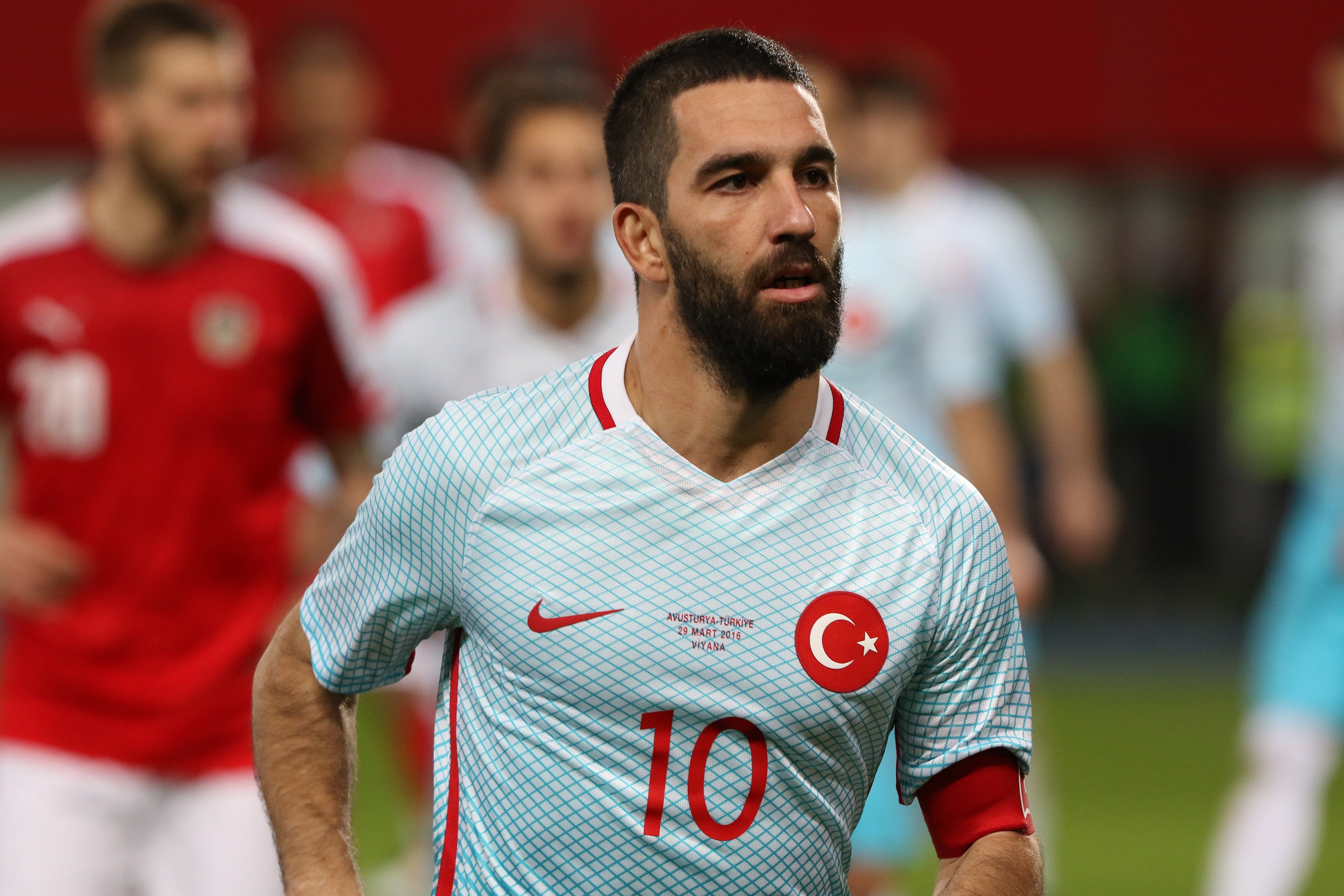
Arda Turan scored 600th goal for the Turkish national team.

As of 18 November 2025.

| Goal no. | Date | Scorer | Opponent | Result |
|---|---|---|---|---|
| 1st | 26 October 1923 | Zeki Rıza Sporel | Romania | 2–2 |
| 100th | 23 June 1954 | Mustafa Ertan | West Germany | 2–7 |
| 200th | 14 February 1973 | Osman Arpacıoğlu | Algeria | 4–0 |
| 300th | 27 February 1991 | Uğur Tütüneker | Yugoslavia | 1–1 |
| 400th | 27 March 1999 | Sergen Yalçın | Moldova | 2–0 |
| 500th | 9 October 2004 | Fatih Tekke | Kazakhstan | 4–0 |
| 600th | 5 September 2009 | Arda Turan | Estonia | 4–2 |
| 700th | 3 September 2015 | Selçuk İnan | Latvia | 1–1 |
| 800th | 13 November 2021 | Kerem Aktürkoğlu | Gibraltar | 6–0 |
| 900th | 18 November 2025 | Deniz Gül | Spain | 2–2 |

== Competitive record ==
=== FIFA World Cup ===
| FIFA World Cup record | | | | | | | | | | Qualification record | | | | | | |
| Year | Result | Rank | M | W | D | L | GF | GA | Squad | M | W | D | L | GF | GA | Link |
|---|---|---|---|---|---|---|---|---|---|---|---|---|---|---|---|---|
| (Uruguay) 1930 | Did not enter | | | | | | | | | Did not enter | | | | | | Link |
| (Italy) 1934 | Withdrew | | | | | | | | | Withdrew | | | | | | Link |
| (France) 1938 | Did not enter | | | | | | | | | Did not enter | | | | | | Link |
| (Brazil) 1950 | Qualified but withdrew | | | | | | | | | 1 | 1 | 0 | 0 | 7 | 0 | Link |
| (Switzerland) 1954 | Group stage | 9th | 3 | 1 | 0 | 2 | 10 | 11 | Squad | 3 | 1 | 1 | 1 | 4 | 6 | Link |
| (Sweden) 1958 | Withdrew | | | | | | | | | Withdrew | | | | | | Link |
| (Chile) 1962 | Did not qualify | | | | | | | | | 4 | 2 | 0 | 2 | 4 | 4 | Link |
| (England) 1966 | Did not qualify | | | | | | | | | 6 | 1 | 0 | 5 | 4 | 19 | Link |
| (Mexico) 1970 | Did not qualify | | | | | | | | | 4 | 0 | 0 | 4 | 2 | 13 | Link |
| (West Germany) 1974 | Did not qualify | | | | | | | | | 6 | 2 | 2 | 2 | 5 | 3 | Link |
| (Argentina) 1978 | Did not qualify | | | | | | | | | 6 | 2 | 1 | 3 | 9 | 5 | Link |
| (Spain) 1982 | Did not qualify | | | | | | | | | 8 | 0 | 0 | 8 | 1 | 22 | Link |
| (Mexico) 1986 | Did not qualify | | | | | | | | | 8 | 0 | 1 | 7 | 2 | 24 | Link |
| (Italy) 1990 | Did not qualify | | | | | | | | | 8 | 3 | 1 | 4 | 12 | 10 | Link |
| (United States) 1994 | Did not qualify | | | | | | | | | 10 | 3 | 1 | 6 | 11 | 19 | Link |
| (France) 1998 | Did not qualify | | | | | | | | | 8 | 4 | 2 | 2 | 21 | 9 | Link |
| (South Korea) (Japan) 2002 | Third place | 3rd | 7 | 4 | 1 | 2 | 10 | 6 | Squad | 12 | 8 | 3 | 1 | 24 | 8 | Link |
| (Germany) 2006 | Did not qualify | | | | | | | | | 14 | 7 | 5 | 2 | 27 | 13 | Link |
| (South Africa) 2010 | Did not qualify | | | | | | | | | 10 | 4 | 3 | 3 | 13 | 10 | Link |
| (Brazil) 2014 | Did not qualify | | | | | | | | | 10 | 5 | 1 | 4 | 16 | 9 | Link |
| (Russia) 2018 | Did not qualify | | | | | | | | | 10 | 4 | 3 | 3 | 14 | 13 | Link |
| (Qatar) 2022 | Did not qualify | | | | | | | | | 11 | 6 | 3 | 2 | 28 | 19 | Link |
| (Canada) (Mexico) (United States) 2026 | Group stage | 35th | 3 | 1 | 0 | 2 | 3 | 5 | Squad | 8 | 6 | 1 | 1 | 19 | 12 | Link |
| (Morocco) (Portugal) (Spain) 2030 | To be determined | | | | | | | | | | | | | | | |
| (Saudi Arabia) 2034 | To be determined | | | | | | | | | | | | | | | |
| Total:3/23 | Third place | 3rd | 13 | 6 | 1 | 6 | 23 | 22 | — | 146 | 59 | 28 | 60 | 223 | 218 | Link |

Turkey's FIFA World Cup history
| Year | Round | Score | Result | Date | Venue |
|---|---|---|---|---|---|
| 1954 | Group 2 | Turkey 1–4 West Germany | Loss | 17 June 1954 | Bern, Switzerland |
| 1954 | Group 2 | Turkey 7–0 South Korea | Win | 20 June 1954 | Geneva, Switzerland |
| 1954 | Group 2 | Turkey 2–7 West Germany | Loss | 23 June 1954 | Zürich, Switzerland |
| 2002 | Group C | Turkey 1–2 Brazil | Loss | 3 June 2002 | Ulsan, South Korea |
| 2002 | Group C | Turkey 1–1 Costa Rica | Draw | 9 June 2002 | Incheon, South Korea |
| 2002 | Group C | Turkey 3–0 China | Win | 13 June 2002 | Seoul, South Korea |
| 2002 | Round of 16 | Turkey 1–0 Japan | Win | 18 June 2002 | Rifu, Japan |
| 2002 | Quarter-final | Turkey 1–0 (a.s.d.e.t.) Senegal | Win | 22 June 2002 | Osaka, Japan |
| 2002 | Semi-final | Turkey 0–1 Brazil | Loss | 26 June 2002 | Saitama, Japan |
| 2002 | Third place play-off | Turkey 3–2 South Korea | Win | 29 June 2002 | Daegu, South Korea |
| 2026 | Group D | Turkey 0–2 Australia | Loss | 13 June 2026 | Vancouver, Canada |
| 2026 | Group D | Turkey 0–1 Paraguay | Loss | 19 June 2026 | Santa Clara, United States |
| 2026 | Group D | Turkey 3–2 United States | Win | 25 June 2026 | Inglewood, United States |

=== UEFA European Championship ===
| UEFA European Championship record | | | | | | | | | | Qualification record | | | | | | |
| Year | Result | Rank | M | W | D | L | GF | GA | Squad | M | W | D | L | GF | GA | Link |
|---|---|---|---|---|---|---|---|---|---|---|---|---|---|---|---|---|
| (France) 1960 | Did not qualify | | | | | | | | | 2 | 1 | 0 | 1 | 2 | 3 | Link |
| (Spain) 1964 | Did not qualify | | | | | | | | | 2 | 0 | 0 | 2 | 0 | 7 | Link |
| (Italy) 1968 | Did not qualify | | | | | | | | | 6 | 1 | 2 | 3 | 3 | 8 | Link |
| (Belgium) 1972 | Did not qualify | | | | | | | | | 6 | 2 | 1 | 3 | 5 | 13 | Link |
| (Socialist Federal Republic of Yugoslavia) 1976 | Did not qualify | | | | | | | | | 6 | 2 | 2 | 2 | 5 | 10 | Link |
| (Italy) 1980 | Did not qualify | | | | | | | | | 6 | 3 | 1 | 2 | 5 | 5 | Link |
| (France) 1984 | Did not qualify | | | | | | | | | 8 | 3 | 1 | 4 | 8 | 16 | Link |
| (West Germany) 1988 | Did not qualify | | | | | | | | | 6 | 0 | 2 | 4 | 2 | 16 | Link |
| (Sweden) 1992 | Did not qualify | | | | | | | | | 6 | 0 | 0 | 6 | 1 | 14 | Link |
| (England) 1996 | Group stage | 16th | 3 | 0 | 0 | 3 | 0 | 5 | Squad | 8 | 4 | 3 | 1 | 16 | 8 | Link |
| (Belgium) (Netherlands) 2000 | Quarter-finals | 6th | 4 | 1 | 1 | 2 | 3 | 4 | Squad | 10 | 5 | 4 | 1 | 16 | 7 | Link |
| (Portugal) 2004 | Did not qualify | | | | | | | | | 10 | 6 | 2 | 2 | 19 | 8 | Link |
| (Austria) (Switzerland) 2008 | Semi-finals | 3rd | 5 | 2 | 1 | 2 | 8 | 9 | Squad | 12 | 7 | 3 | 2 | 25 | 11 | Link |
| (Poland) (Ukraine) 2012 | Did not qualify | | | | | | | | | 12 | 5 | 3 | 4 | 13 | 14 | Link |
| (France) 2016 | Group stage | 17th | 3 | 1 | 0 | 2 | 2 | 4 | Squad | 10 | 5 | 3 | 2 | 14 | 9 | Link |
| (Europe) 2020 | Group stage | 24th | 3 | 0 | 0 | 3 | 1 | 8 | Squad | 10 | 7 | 2 | 1 | 18 | 3 | Link |
| (Germany) 2024 | Quarter-finals | 7th | 5 | 3 | 0 | 2 | 8 | 8 | Squad | 8 | 5 | 2 | 1 | 14 | 7 | Link |
| (England) (Scotland) (Republic of Ireland) (Wales) 2028 | To be determined | | | | | | | | | To be determined | | | | | | Link |
| (Italy) (Turkey) 2032 | Qualified as co-hosts | | | | | | | | | Qualified as co-hosts | | | | | | Link |
| Total | Semi-finals | 6/19 | 23 | 7 | 2 | 14 | 22 | 38 | | 128 | 56 | 31 | 41 | 166 | 159 | Link |

Turkey's UEFA European Championship history
| Year | Round | Score | Result | Date | Venue |
|---|---|---|---|---|---|
| 1996 | Group D | Turkey 0–1 Croatia | Loss | 11 June 1996 | Nottingham, England |
| 1996 | Group D | Turkey 0–1 Portugal | Loss | 14 June 1996 | Nottingham, England |
| 1996 | Group D | Turkey 0–3 Denmark | Loss | 19 June 1996 | Sheffield, England |
| 2000 | Group B | Turkey 1–2 Italy | Loss | 11 June 2000 | Arnhem, Netherlands |
| 2000 | Group B | Turkey 0–0 Sweden | Draw | 15 June 2000 | Eindhoven, Netherlands |
| 2000 | Group B | Turkey 2–0 Belgium | Win | 19 June 2000 | Brussels, Belgium |
| 2000 | Quarter-final | Turkey 0–2 Portugal | Loss | 24 June 2000 | Amsterdam, Netherlands |
| 2008 | Group A | Turkey 0–2 Portugal | Loss | 7 June 2008 | Geneva, Switzerland |
| 2008 | Group A | Turkey 2–1 Switzerland | Win | 11 June 2008 | Basel, Switzerland |
| 2008 | Group A | Turkey 3–2 Czech Republic | Win | 15 June 2008 | Geneva, Switzerland |
| 2008 | Quarter-final | Turkey 1–1 (3–1 p) Croatia | Draw | 20 June 2008 | Wien, Austria |
| 2008 | Semi-final | Turkey 2–3 Germany | Loss | 25 June 2008 | Basel, Switzerland |
| 2016 | Group D | Turkey 0–1 Croatia | Loss | 12 June 2016 | Paris, France |
| 2016 | Group D | Turkey 0–3 Spain | Loss | 17 June 2016 | Nice, France |
| 2016 | Group D | Turkey 2–0 Czech Republic | Win | 21 June 2016 | Lens, France |
| 2020 | Group A | Turkey 0–3 Italy | Loss | 11 June 2021 | Rome, Italy |
| 2020 | Group A | Turkey 0–2 Wales | Loss | 16 June 2021 | Baku, Azerbaijan |
| 2020 | Group A | Turkey 1–3 Switzerland | Loss | 20 June 2021 | Baku, Azerbaijan |
| 2024 | Group F | Turkey 3–1 Georgia | Win | 18 June 2024 | Dortmund, Germany |
| 2024 | Group F | Turkey 0–3 Portugal | Loss | 22 June 2024 | Dortmund, Germany |
| 2024 | Group F | Turkey 2–1 Czech Republic | Win | 26 June 2024 | Hamburg, Germany |
| 2024 | Round of 16 | Turkey 2–1 Austria | Win | 2 July 2024 | Leipzig, Germany |
| 2024 | Quarter-final | Turkey 1–2 Netherlands | Loss | 6 July 2024 | Berlin, Germany |

=== UEFA Nations League ===
UEFA Nations League record
| Season | Division | Group | M | W | D | L | GF | GA | P/R | RK |
|---|---|---|---|---|---|---|---|---|---|---|
| 2018–19 | B | 2 | 4 | 1 | 0 | 3 | 4 | 7 | Same position | 22nd |
| 2020–21 | B | 3 | 6 | 1 | 3 | 2 | 6 | 8 | ▼ | 29th |
| 2022–23 | C | 1 | 6 | 4 | 1 | 1 | 18 | 5 | ▲ | 35th |
| 2024–25 | B | 4 | 8 | 5 | 2 | 1 | 15 | 7 | ▲ | 23rd |
| 2026–27 | A | 1 | 4 | 0 | 0 | 4 | 2 | 11 | ▼ | 15th |
| Total | | | 28 | 11 | 6 | 11 | 45 | 38 | 15th | |

=== FIFA Confederations Cup ===
FIFA Confederations Cup record
| Year | Result | Position | Pld | W | D | L | GF | GA | Squad |
|---|---|---|---|---|---|---|---|---|---|
| (Saudi Arabia) 1992 | Did not qualify | | | | | | | | |
| (Saudi Arabia) 1995 | Did not qualify | | | | | | | | |
| (Saudi Arabia) 1997 | Did not qualify | | | | | | | | |
| (Mexico) 1999 | Did not qualify | | | | | | | | |
| (South Korea) (Japan) 2001 | Did not qualify | | | | | | | | |
| (France) 2003 | Third place | 3rd | 5 | 2 | 1 | 2 | 8 | 8 | Squad |
| (Germany) 2005 | Did not qualify | | | | | | | | |
| (South Africa) 2009 | Did not qualify | | | | | | | | |
| (Brazil) 2013 | Did not qualify | | | | | | | | |
| (Russia) 2017 | Did not qualify | | | | | | | | |
| Total | Third place | 1/10 | 5 | 2 | 1 | 2 | 8 | 8 | — |

=== Olympic Games ===
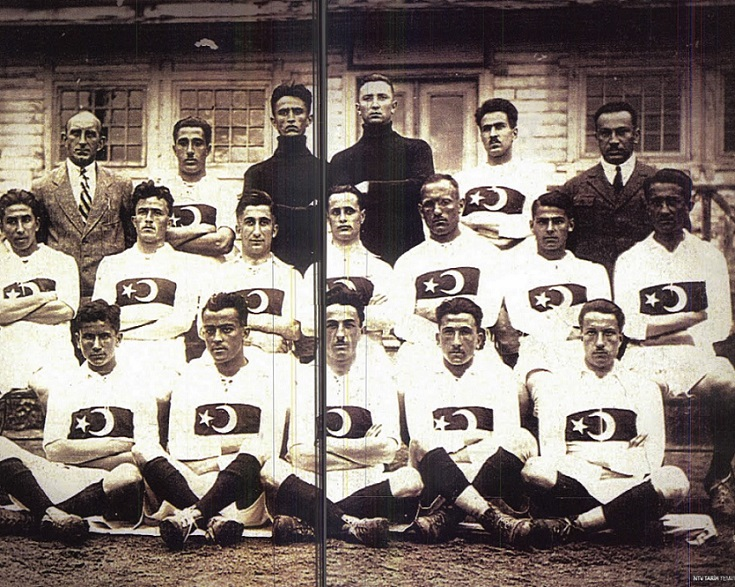
Turkey at the 1924 Summer Olympics in Paris

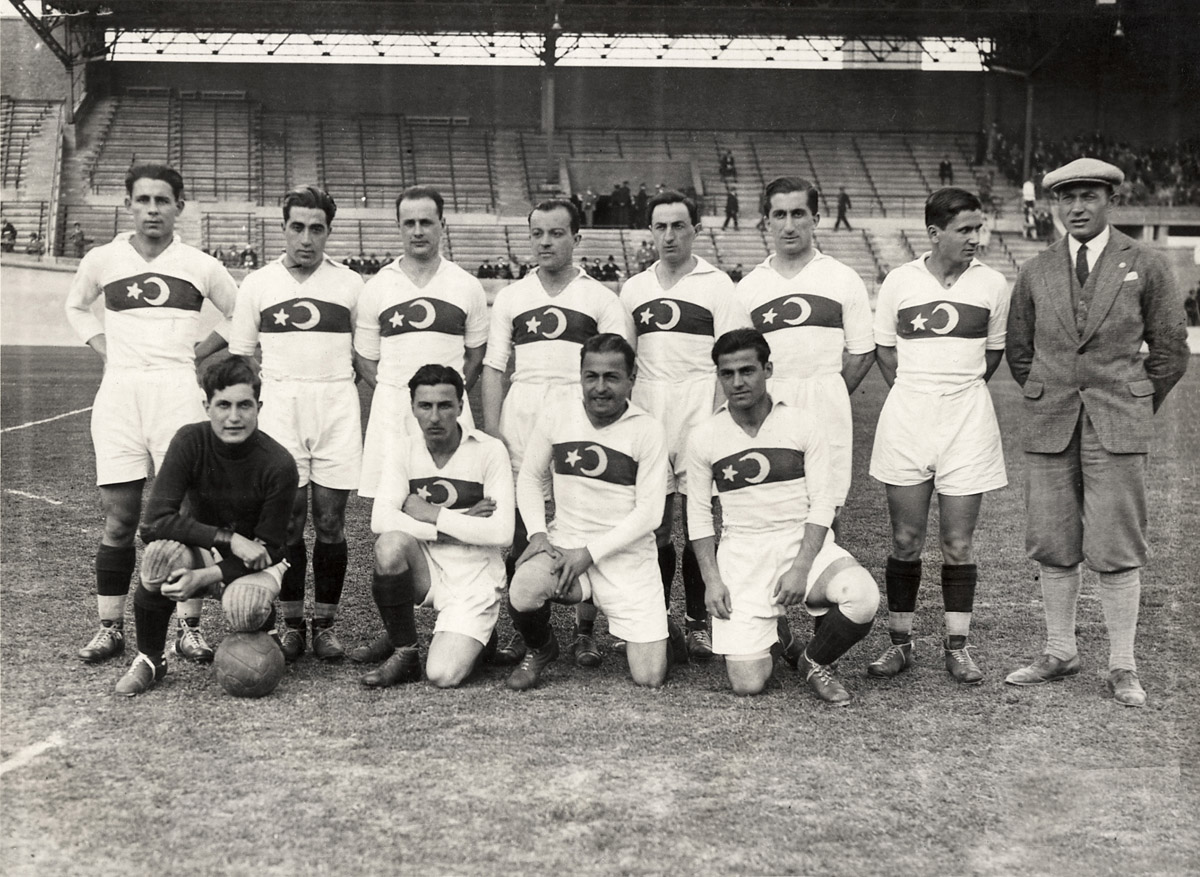
Turkey at the 1928 Summer Olympics in Amsterdam

For 1968–1988 see this page. Football at the Summer Olympics has been an under-23 tournament since 1992.

Olympic Games record
| Year | Result | Position | Pld | W | D | L | GF | GA | Squad |
|---|---|---|---|---|---|---|---|---|---|
| (France) 1924 | Round 1 | 13th | 1 | 0 | 0 | 1 | 2 | 5 | Squad |
| (Netherlands) 1928 | Round 1 | 14th | 1 | 0 | 0 | 1 | 1 | 7 | Squad |
| (Nazi Germany) 1936 | Round 1 | 15th | 1 | 0 | 0 | 1 | 0 | 1 | Squad |
| (United Kingdom) 1948 | Quarter-finals | 6th | 2 | 1 | 0 | 1 | 5 | 3 | Squad |
| (Finland) 1952 | Quarter-finals | 8th | 2 | 1 | 0 | 1 | 3 | 8 | Squad |
| (Australia) 1956 | Withdrew | | | | | | | | |
| (Italy) 1960 | Round 1 | 14th | 3 | 0 | 1 | 2 | 3 | 10 | Squad |
| (Japan) 1964 | Did not qualify | | | | | | | | |
| (Mexico) 1968 | Did not qualify | | | | | | | | |
| (West Germany) 1972 | Did not qualify | | | | | | | | |
| (Canada) 1976 | Did not qualify | | | | | | | | |
| (Soviet Union) 1980 | Did not qualify | | | | | | | | |
| (United States) 1984 | Withdrew | | | | | | | | |
| (South Korea) 1988 | Did not qualify | | | | | | | | |
| Since 1992 | See Turkey national under-23 football team | | | | | | | | |
| Total | Quarter-finals | 6/14 | 10 | 2 | 1 | 7 | 14 | 34 | — |

=== Mediterranean Games ===
Mediterranean Games record
| Year | Result | Position | Pld | W | D | L | GF | GA |
|---|---|---|---|---|---|---|---|---|
| (Egypt) 1951 | Did not participate | | | | | | | |
| (Spain) 1955 | Did not participate | | | | | | | |
| (Lebanon) 1959 | Runners-up | 2nd | 2 | 1 | 1 | 0 | 7 | 4 |
| (Italy) 1963 | Runners-up | 2nd | 5 | 3 | 1 | 1 | 12 | 7 |
| (Tunisia) 1967 | Fourth place | 4th | 5 | 2 | 1 | 2 | 5 | 7 |
| (Turkey) 1971 | Third place | 3rd | 4 | 3 | 1 | 0 | 4 | 1 |
| (Algeria) 1975 | Group stage | 7th | 4 | 0 | 2 | 2 | 1 | 5 |
| (Socialist Federal Republic of Yugoslavia) 1979 | Group stage | 5th | 3 | 1 | 1 | 1 | 2 | 2 |
| (Morocco) 1983 | Runners-up | 2nd | 4 | 2 | 0 | 2 | 4 | 5 |
| (Syria) 1987 | Third place | 3rd | 5 | 3 | 0 | 2 | 6 | 2 |
| 1991–present | See Turkey national under-20 football team | | | | | | | |
| Total | Runners-up | 8/10 | 32 | 15 | 7 | 10 | 41 | 33 |

=== Mediterranean Cup ===
Mediterranean Cup record
| Year | Result | Position | Pld | W | D | L | GF | GA |
|---|---|---|---|---|---|---|---|---|
| (Greece) 1949 | Runners-up | 2nd | 3 | 2 | 0 | 1 | 7 | 6 |
| 1950–53 | Fourth place | 4th | 3 | 6 | 1 | 1 | 4 | 4 |
| 1953–58 | Fourth place | 4th | 8 | 2 | 3 | 3 | 7 | 7 |
| Total | Runners-up | 3/3 | 14 | 10 | 4 | 5 | 18 | 17 |

=== Balkan Cup ===
Balkan Cup record
| Year | Result | Position | Pld | W | D | L | GF | GA |
|---|---|---|---|---|---|---|---|---|
| 1929–31 | Did not participate | | | | | | | |
| (Bulgaria) 1931 | Runners-up | 2nd | 2 | 1 | 0 | 1 | 3 | 5 |
| (Socialist Federal Republic of Yugoslavia) 1932 | Did not participate | | | | | | | |
| (Romania) 1933 | Did not participate | | | | | | | |
| (Greece) 1934–35 | Did not participate | | | | | | | |
| (Bulgaria) 1935 | Did not participate | | | | | | | |
| (Romania) 1936 | Did not participate | | | | | | | |
| (Albania) 1946 | Did not participate | | | | | | | |
| 1947 | Did not participate | | | | | | | |
| 1948 | Did not participate | | | | | | | |
| 1973–76 | Semi-finals | 4th | 2 | 1 | 0 | 1 | 6 | 7 |
| 1977–80 | Group stage | 3rd | 4 | 1 | 1 | 2 | 4 | 8 |
| Total | Runners-up | 3/12 | 8 | 3 | 1 | 4 | 13 | 20 |

=== ECO Cup ===
ECO Cup record
| Year | Result | Position | Pld | W | D | L | GF | GA |
|---|---|---|---|---|---|---|---|---|
| (Iran) 1965 | Runners-up | 2nd | 2 | 1 | 1 | 0 | 3 | 1 |
| (Pakistan) 1967 | Champions | 1st | 4 | 2 | 2 | 0 | 8 | 4 |
| (Turkey) 1969 | Champions | 1st | 4 | 2 | 2 | 0 | 8 | 2 |
| (Iran) 1970 | Runners-up | 2nd | 3 | 2 | 1 | 0 | 4 | 2 |
| (Pakistan) 1974 | Champions | 1st | 3 | 2 | 1 | 0 | 3 | 2 |
| (Iran) 1993 | Did not participate | | | | | | | |
| Total | 3 titles | 5/6 | 16 | 9 | 7 | 0 | 26 | 11 |

== Head-to-head record ==
The following table shows Turkey's all-time international record, as of 5 October 2026.

Positive record
Neutral record
Negative record

| Opponents | Pld | W | D | L | GF | GA | GD |
|---|---|---|---|---|---|---|---|
| Albania | 12 | 6 | 2 | 4 | 13 | 14 | -1 |
| Algeria | 3 | 1 | 0 | 2 | 4 | 2 | +2 |
| Andorra | 4 | 4 | 0 | 0 | 10 | 0 | +10 |
| Angola | 1 | 1 | 0 | 0 | 3 | 2 | +1 |
| Armenia | 4 | 3 | 1 | 0 | 7 | 2 | +5 |
| Australia | 3 | 2 | 0 | 1 | 4 | 3 | +1 |
| Austria | 18 | 8 | 1 | 9 | 25 | 25 | 0 |
| Azerbaijan | 8 | 6 | 1 | 1 | 11 | 3 | +8 |
| Belarus | 4 | 2 | 1 | 1 | 8 | 7 | +1 |
| Belgium | 12 | 3 | 5 | 4 | 17 | 21 | -4 |
| Bosnia and Herzegovina | 6 | 2 | 2 | 2 | 6 | 7 | -1 |
| Brazil | 6 | 0 | 2 | 4 | 3 | 10 | -7 |
| Bulgaria | 29 | 9 | 6 | 14 | 42 | 52 | -10 |
| Cameroon | 1 | 0 | 0 | 1 | 0 | 1 | -1 |
| Canada | 2 | 2 | 0 | 0 | 6 | 1 | +5 |
| Chile | 3 | 2 | 1 | 0 | 3 | 0 | +3 |
| China | 2 | 2 | 0 | 0 | 7 | 0 | +7 |
| Colombia | 1 | 1 | 0 | 0 | 2 | 1 | +1 |
| Costa Rica | 1 | 0 | 1 | 0 | 1 | 1 | 0 |
| Croatia | 12 | 2 | 6 | 4 | 11 | 15 | -4 |
| Czech Republic (Note: Includes the results of Czechoslovakia.) | 22 | 7 | 3 | 12 | 22 | 46 | -24 |
| Denmark | 10 | 2 | 5 | 3 | 9 | 12 | -3 |
| East Germany | 5 | 3 | 1 | 1 | 10 | 5 | +5 |
| Ecuador | 1 | 0 | 0 | 1 | 0 | 1 | -1 |
| Egypt | 6 | 4 | 0 | 2 | 13 | 10 | +3 |
| England | 11 | 0 | 2 | 9 | 1 | 33 | -32 |
| Estonia | 8 | 5 | 3 | 0 | 17 | 4 | +13 |
| Ethiopia | 2 | 1 | 1 | 0 | 3 | 0 | +3 |
| Faroe Islands | 3 | 1 | 1 | 1 | 6 | 3 | +3 |
| Finland | 15 | 5 | 4 | 6 | 24 | 22 | +2 |
| France | 7 | 1 | 1 | 5 | 5 | 14 | -9 |
| Georgia | 9 | 7 | 1 | 1 | 26 | 10 | +16 |
| Germany (Note: Includes the results of West Germany.) | 22 | 4 | 4 | 14 | 16 | 52 | -36 |
| Ghana | 2 | 0 | 2 | 0 | 3 | 3 | 0 |
| Gibraltar | 2 | 2 | 0 | 0 | 9 | 0 | +9 |
| Greece | 14 | 9 | 2 | 3 | 22 | 11 | +11 |
| Guinea | 1 | 0 | 1 | 0 | 0 | 0 | 0 |
| Honduras | 3 | 3 | 0 | 0 | 5 | 0 | +5 |
| Hungary | 20 | 7 | 2 | 11 | 26 | 36 | -10 |
| Iceland | 15 | 4 | 3 | 8 | 18 | 26 | -8 |
| Iran | 7 | 5 | 2 | 0 | 14 | 2 | +12 |
| Iraq | 3 | 2 | 1 | 0 | 8 | 1 | +7 |
| Israel | 6 | 4 | 0 | 2 | 9 | 12 | -3 |
| Italy | 18 | 0 | 5 | 13 | 12 | 36 | -24 |
| Ivory Coast | 1 | 0 | 1 | 0 | 1 | 1 | 0 |
| Japan | 3 | 1 | 0 | 2 | 3 | 5 | -2 |
| Kazakhstan | 6 | 6 | 0 | 0 | 19 | 2 | +17 |
| Kosovo | 4 | 4 | 0 | 0 | 13 | 2 | +11 |
| Latvia | 10 | 4 | 5 | 1 | 22 | 15 | +7 |
| Libya | 2 | 0 | 1 | 1 | 2 | 3 | -1 |
| Liechtenstein | 2 | 2 | 0 | 0 | 9 | 0 | +9 |
| Lithuania | 2 | 2 | 0 | 0 | 8 | 0 | +8 |
| Luxembourg | 9 | 7 | 1 | 1 | 18 | 9 | +9 |
| Malaysia | 1 | 1 | 0 | 0 | 3 | 0 | +3 |
| Malta | 6 | 5 | 1 | 0 | 15 | 4 | +11 |
| Moldova | 13 | 11 | 2 | 0 | 35 | 3 | +32 |
| Montenegro | 6 | 3 | 2 | 1 | 9 | 8 | +1 |
| Mexico | 1 | 0 | 0 | 1 | 0 | 1 | -1 |
| Netherlands | 15 | 4 | 4 | 7 | 15 | 23 | -8 |
| New Zealand | 1 | 1 | 0 | 0 | 2 | 1 | +1 |
| North Macedonia | 9 | 6 | 2 | 1 | 18 | 9 | +9 |
| Northern Ireland | 12 | 5 | 2 | 5 | 12 | 12 | 0 |
| Norway | 11 | 5 | 3 | 3 | 15 | 16 | -1 |
| Pakistan | 5 | 4 | 1 | 0 | 20 | 10 | +10 |
| Paraguay | 2 | 0 | 1 | 1 | 0 | 1 | -1 |
| Poland | 18 | 3 | 3 | 12 | 13 | 41 | -28 |
| Portugal | 10 | 2 | 0 | 8 | 9 | 22 | -13 |
| Qatar | 1 | 1 | 0 | 0 | 2 | 1 | +1 |
| Republic of Ireland | 14 | 3 | 6 | 5 | 16 | 27 | -11 |
| Romania | 28 | 7 | 7 | 14 | 26 | 49 | -23 |
| Russia (Note: Includes the results of Soviet Union.) | 23 | 4 | 3 | 16 | 12 | 39 | -27 |
| San Marino | 4 | 3 | 1 | 0 | 16 | 1 | +15 |
| Saudi Arabia | 3 | 3 | 0 | 0 | 6 | 1 | +5 |
| Scotland | 2 | 2 | 0 | 0 | 4 | 2 | +2 |
| Senegal | 1 | 1 | 0 | 0 | 1 | 0 | +1 |
| Slovakia | 6 | 4 | 1 | 1 | 8 | 3 | +5 |
| Slovenia | 2 | 1 | 0 | 1 | 1 | 2 | -1 |
| South Africa | 1 | 0 | 0 | 1 | 0 | 2 | -2 |
| South Korea | 7 | 4 | 2 | 1 | 13 | 4 | +9 |
| Spain | 13 | 1 | 5 | 7 | 7 | 25 | -18 |
| Serbia (Note: Includes the results of Yugoslavia.) | 12 | 1 | 5 | 6 | 16 | 28 | -12 |
| Sweden | 12 | 5 | 4 | 3 | 15 | 14 | +1 |
| Switzerland | 16 | 8 | 3 | 5 | 22 | 23 | -1 |
| Syria | 1 | 1 | 0 | 0 | 7 | 0 | +7 |
| Tunisia | 5 | 1 | 4 | 0 | 6 | 3 | +3 |
| Ukraine | 9 | 4 | 3 | 2 | 11 | 9 | +2 |
| United States | 6 | 3 | 1 | 2 | 10 | 9 | +1 |
| Uruguay | 1 | 0 | 0 | 1 | 2 | 3 | -1 |
| Uzbekistan | 1 | 1 | 0 | 0 | 2 | 0 | +2 |
| Venezuela | 1 | 1 | 0 | 0 | 2 | 1 | +1 |
| Wales | 13 | 5 | 4 | 4 | 14 | 14 | 0 |
| Total (94) | 663 | 267 | 151 | 247 | 931 | 946 | -15 |

== Honours ==
=== Global ===
- FIFA World Cup
  - (bronze) Third place (1): 2002
- FIFA Confederations Cup
  - (bronze) Third place (1): 2003

=== Continental ===
- UEFA European Championship
  - Semi-finalist: 2008 (Note: Although there was no third-place play-off match, UEFA decided to award the defeated semi-finalists of Euro 2008 with bronze medals.)

=== Regional ===
- Balkan Cup
  - Runners-up (1): 1931
- Mediterranean Cup
  - Runners-up (1): 1949
- Islamic Games
  - Silver medal (1): 1980

=== Friendly ===
- ECO Cup
  - Champions (3): 1967, 1969, 1974
  - Runners-up (2): 1965, 1970

=== Summary ===
| Competition | 1st place, gold medalist(s) | 2nd place, silver medalist(s) | 3rd place, bronze medalist(s) | Total |
|---|---|---|---|---|
| FIFA World Cup | 0 | 0 | 1 | 1 |
| FIFA Confederations Cup | 0 | 0 | 1 | 1 |
| Total | 0 | 0 | 2 | 2 |

=== Decoration ===
In 2002, the national team was honored with the Turkish "State Medal of Distinguished Service" for their third place achievement at the 2002 FIFA World Cup. All the team members, coaches and officials were given medals.

== See also ==
- Turkey national football team results
- List of Turkey international footballers
- List of Turkey national football team managers
- Turkey national football B team
- Turkey national under-21 football team
- Turkey national under-20 football team
- Turkey national under-19 football team
- Turkey national under-18 football team
- Turkey national under-17 football team
- Turkey national under-16 football team
- Turkey national under-15 football team
- Turkey national youth football team
- Turkish football clubs in European competitions
