= List of international goals scored by Hakan Şükür =

List of international goals scored by Turkish footballer Hakan Şükür

Hakan Şükür is the all-time top goalscorer for the Turkey national football team. Between his international debut in 1992 and his final match in 2007, he scored 51 goals in 112 senior appearances.

Şükür won his first cap for Turkey in a friendly with Luxembourg in March 1992 – his debut being awarded by German manager Sepp Piontek. He scored his first international goal in his next match against Denmark, and totalled six goals in his first 11 appearances. He netted seven times in qualification for UEFA Euro 1996 and started all of the matches at the finals in England.

During qualification for the 1998 FIFA World Cup, Şükür scored eight times, with half of those coming in a 6–4 home win over Wales on 20 August 1997. At UEFA Euro 2000, he netted twice for the quarter-finalists in a 2–0 group stage win against co-hosts Belgium. During the 2002 FIFA World Cup, held in South Korea and Japan, Şükür scored the fastest ever goal in a FIFA World Cup and in any major international football tournament. He netted against South Korea 10.8 seconds into the third-place play-off on 29 June, which Turkey went on to win 3–2.

Of his 112 senior appearances, Şükür captained Turkey in thirty. After appearing in UEFA Euro 2008 qualifying, where he notably scored four goals against Moldova in a 5–0 win in Frankfurt, he was not selected for the finals. His last game was a 0–1 home loss to Greece on 17 October 2007 at the age of 36.

== International goals ==
Scores and results list Turkey's goal tally first, score column indicates score after each Şükür goal.

No.	Date	Venue	Opponent	Score	Result	Competition
1	8 April 1992	Ankara, Turkey	Denmark	—	2–1	Friendly
2	26 August 1992	Trabzon, Turkey	Bulgaria	—	3–2	Friendly
3	26 August 1992	Trabzon, Turkey	Bulgaria	—	3–2	Friendly
4	28 October 1992	Ankara, Turkey	San Marino	1–0	4–1	1994 World Cup qualification
5	28 October 1992	Ankara, Turkey	San Marino	3–1	4–1	1994 World Cup qualification
6	27 October 1993	Istanbul, Turkey	Poland	1–1	2–1	1994 World Cup qualification
7	7 September 1994	Budapest, Hungary	Hungary	1–2	2–2	Euro 1996 qualifying
8	12 October 1994	Istanbul, Turkey	Iceland	3–0	5–0	Euro 1996 qualifying
9	12 October 1994	Istanbul, Turkey	Iceland	4–0	5–0	Euro 1996 qualifying
10	26 April 1995	Bern, Switzerland	Switzerland	1–0	2–1	Euro 1996 qualifying
11	6 September 1995	Istanbul, Turkey	Hungary	1–0	2–0	Euro 1996 qualifying
12	6 September 1995	Istanbul, Turkey	Hungary	2–0	2–0	Euro 1996 qualifying
13	15 November 1995	Stockholm, Sweden	Sweden	2–1	2–2	Euro 1996 qualifying
14	1 May 1996	Samsun, Turkey	Ukraine	—	3–2	Friendly
15	10 November 1996	Istanbul, Turkey	San Marino	4–0	7–0	1998 World Cup qualification
16	10 November 1996	Istanbul, Turkey	San Marino	6–0	7–0	1998 World Cup qualification
17	2 April 1997	Bursa, Turkey	Netherlands	1–0	1–0	1998 World Cup qualification
18	20 August 1997	Istanbul, Turkey	Wales	1–0	6–4	1998 World Cup qualification
19	20 August 1997	Istanbul, Turkey	Wales	3–3	6–4	1998 World Cup qualification
20	20 August 1997	Istanbul, Turkey	Wales	5–4	6–4	1998 World Cup qualification
21	20 August 1997	Istanbul, Turkey	Wales	6–4	6–4	1998 World Cup qualification
22	10 September 1997	Serravalle, San Marino	San Marino	3–0	5–0	1998 World Cup qualification
23	10 October 1998	Bursa, Turkey	Germany	1–0	1–0	Euro 2000 qualifying
24	27 March 1999	Istanbul, Turkey	Moldova	1–0	2–0	Euro 2000 qualifying
25	5 June 1999	Helsinki, Finland	Finland	2–2	4–2	Euro 2000 qualifying
26	5 June 1999	Helsinki, Finland	Finland	4–2	4–2	Euro 2000 qualifying
27	19 June 2000	Brussels, Belgium	Belgium	1–0	2–0	UEFA Euro 2000
28	19 June 2000	Brussels, Belgium	Belgium	2–0	2–0	UEFA Euro 2000
29	11 October 2000	Baku, Azerbaijan	Azerbaijan	1–0	1–0	2002 World Cup qualification
30	24 March 2001	Istanbul, Turkey	Slovakia	1–0	1–1	2002 World Cup qualification
31	2 June 2001	Istanbul, Turkey	Azerbaijan	3–0	3–0	2002 World Cup qualification
32	15 August 2001	Oslo, Norway	Norway	1–1	1–1	Friendly
33	1 September 2001	Bratislava, Slovakia	Slovakia	1–0	1–0	2002 World Cup qualification
34	5 September 2001	Istanbul, Turkey	Sweden	1–0	1–2	2002 World Cup qualification
35	14 November 2001	Istanbul, Turkey	Austria	2–0	5–0	2002 World Cup qualification
36	17 April 2002	Kerkrade, Netherlands	Chile	1–0	2–0	Friendly
37	29 June 2002	Daegu, South Korea	South Korea	1–0	3–2	2002 FIFA World Cup
38	11 June 2003	Istanbul, Turkey	North Macedonia	3–2	3–2	Euro 2004 qualifying
39	6 September 2003	Vaduz, Liechtenstein	Liechtenstein	3–0	3–0	Euro 2004 qualifying
40	9 September 2003	Dublin, Republic of Ireland	Republic of Ireland	—	2–2	Friendly
41	19 November 2003	Istanbul, Turkey	Latvia	2–0	2–2	Euro 2004 qualifying
42	21 May 2004	Sydney, Australia	Australia	—	3–1	Friendly
43	21 May 2004	Sydney, Australia	Australia	—	3–1	Friendly
44	2 June 2004	Seoul, South Korea	South Korea	1–0	1–0	Friendly
45	5 June 2004	Daegu, South Korea	South Korea	1–0	1–2	Friendly
46	18 August 2004	Denizli, Turkey	Belarus	1–0	1–2	Friendly
47	11 October 2006	Frankfurt, Germany	Moldova	1–0	5–0	Euro 2008 qualifying
48	11 October 2006	Frankfurt, Germany	Moldova	2–0	5–0	Euro 2008 qualifying
49	11 October 2006	Frankfurt, Germany	Moldova	3–0	5–0	Euro 2008 qualifying
50	11 October 2006	Frankfurt, Germany	Moldova	5–0	5–0	Euro 2008 qualifying
51	2 June 2007	Sarajevo, Bosnia and Herzegovina	Bosnia and Herzegovina	1–0	2–3	Euro 2008 qualifying

== Hat-tricks ==
No.	Date	Venue	Opponent	Goals	Result	Competition
1	20 August 1997	Istanbul, Turkey	Wales	4 – (5', 37', 77', 82')	6–4	1998 World Cup qualification
2	11 October 2006	Frankfurt, Germany	Moldova	4 – (35', 37', 43', 73')	5–0	Euro 2008 qualifying

== Statistics ==
Appearances and goals by national team and year
National team	Year	Apps	Goals
Turkey	1992	8	5
Turkey	1993	3	1
Turkey	1994	5	3
Turkey	1995	7	4
Turkey	1996	12	3
Turkey	1997	5	6
Turkey	1998	4	1
Turkey	1999	7	3
Turkey	2000	9	3
Turkey	2001	10	6
Turkey	2002	10	2
Turkey	2003	9	4
Turkey	2004	8	5
Turkey	2005	5	0
Turkey	2006	5	4
Turkey	2007	5	1
Total		112	51

Goals by competition
Competition	Goals
UEFA European Championship qualifying	19
FIFA World Cup qualification	17
Friendlies	12
UEFA European Championship	2
FIFA World Cup	1
Total	51

Goals by opponent
Opponent	Goals
Moldova	5
San Marino	5
Wales	4
Hungary	3
South Korea	3
Australia	2
Azerbaijan	2
Belgium	2
Bulgaria	2
Finland	2
Iceland	2
Slovakia	2
Sweden	2
Austria	1
Belarus	1
Bosnia and Herzegovina	1
Chile	1
Denmark	1
Germany	1
Latvia	1
Liechtenstein	1
North Macedonia	1
Netherlands	1
Norway	1
Poland	1
Republic of Ireland	1
Switzerland	1
Ukraine	1
Total	51

== See also ==
- List of top international men's football goalscorers by country
- Turkey national football team records and statistics
