= Shyqyri =

- Gender: Male

Origin
- Region of origin: Albania, Kosovo

Shyqyri is an Albanian masculine given name and may refer to:

- Shyqyri Alushi (1934–2019), Albanian singer
- Shyqyri Ballgjini (born 1954), Albanian footballer
- Shyqri Nimani (1941–2023), Albanian graphic designer
- Shyqyri Rreli (1930–2019), Albanian footballer
- Shyqyri Shala (born 1965), Albanian footballer
