= Shyqri Nimani =

Albanian graphic designer and professor (1941–2023)

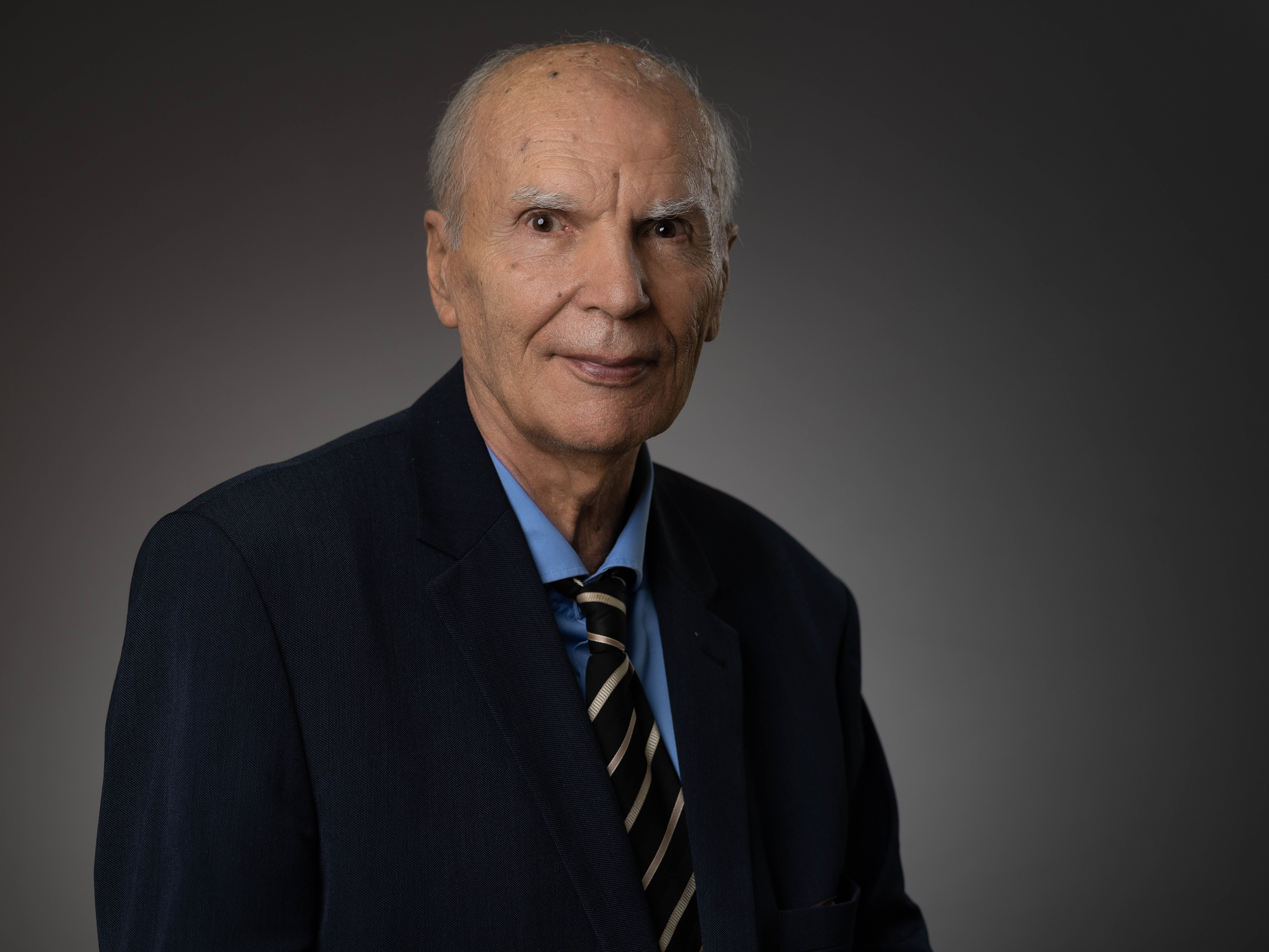
- Nimani in November 2022
- Born: 6 May 1941; Shkodër, Albania
- Died: June 22, 2023 (aged 82)
- Education: Academy of Applied Arts in Belgrade
- Occupations: Graphic designer, professor
- Known for: Founding the Graphic Design department at the University of Pristina
- Notable work: Kosova Film logo, University of Prishtina emblem, Grand Hotel logo, Declaration of Independence calligraphy

Shyqri Nimani (6 May 1941 – 22 June 2023) was a Kosovar Albanian graphic designer and professor. Known as one of the first professional Albanian graphic designers, he was also one of the founders of the Graphic Design department at the Faculty of Arts, University of Pristina.

== Early life and education ==
Nimani was born in Shkodër, Albania on 6 May 1941. He graduated from the Academy of Applied Arts in Belgrade in 1967, from the bookcraft section. He completed his postgraduate two years later in 1969 at the same university, and continued art research in Japan from 1976 to 1978.

== Works ==
Among his best known works are: Grand Hotel logo, University of Prishtina symbol, "117" movie poster, Kosova/UNMIK first stamps, Kosova Film logo, Jesenin book layout and illustration.

Besides graphic design Nimani worked in fields such as illustration, music and haiku poetry. He translated "100 Haiku" from Japanese to Albanian. Nimani was also known to be the calligrapher of the Kosovo's Declaration of Independence document that was signed in 2008.

== Death ==
Nimani died on 22 June 2023, at the age of 82.

== See also ==
- Albanian art
- Modern Albanian art
