= List of Galatasaray S.K. footballers (1–24 appearances) =

The following is a list of Galatasaray S.K footballers based in Istanbul, Turkey.

== Key ==
- The list is ordered first by date of debut, and then if necessary in alphabetical order.
- Appearances as a substitute are included.
- Statistics are correct up to and including the match played on 21 November 2026. Where a player left the club permanently after this date, his statistics are updated to his date of leaving.

Positions key
Pre-1960s		1960s–	
GK	Goalkeeper		
FB	Full back	DF	Defender
HB	Half back	MF	Midfielder
FW	Forward		

Nationality
Unless otherwise noted, the nationality of a player is determined by the country/countries which he has played for, or if said person has not played international football, their country of birth.
Position
Playing positions are listed according to the tactical formations that were employed at the time. Thus the change in the names of defensive and midfield positions reflects the tactical evolution that occurred from the 1960s onwards.
Club career
Club career is defined as the first and last calendar years in which the player appeared for the club in any of the competitions listed below.
Total appearances and Total goals
Total appearances and goals comprise those in the Atatürk Cup, Istanbul Football Cup, Istanbul Football League, Istanbul Friday League, Istanbul Shield, Prime Minister's Cup, Süper Lig, Turkish Football Championship, Turkish Cup, Turkish Super Cup, TSYD Cup, European Cup/UEFA Champions League, UEFA Cup/UEFA Europa League, Inter-Cities Fairs Cup, UEFA Cup Winners' Cup, UEFA Super Cup and FIFA Club World Cup. Matches; wartime matches are regarded as unofficial and are excluded, as are matches from the abandoned 1939–40 season.

== Players ==
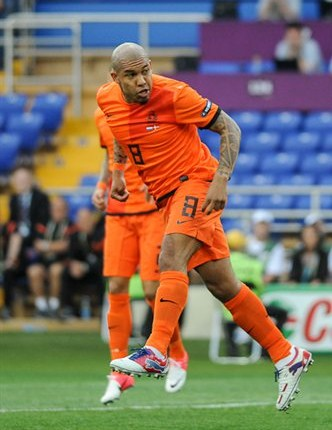
Nigel de Jong made 24 appearances for the Galatasaray.

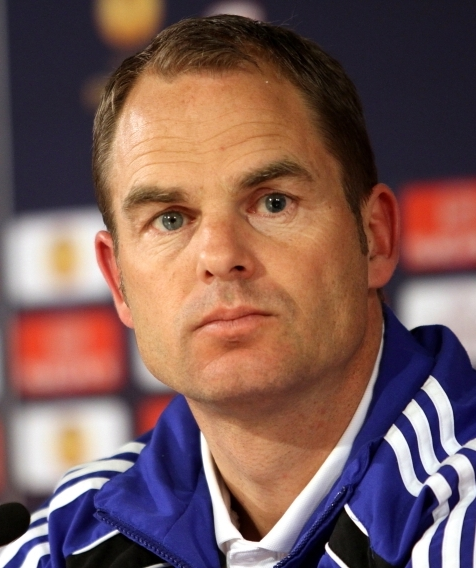
Frank de Boer made 23 appearances for the Galatasaray.

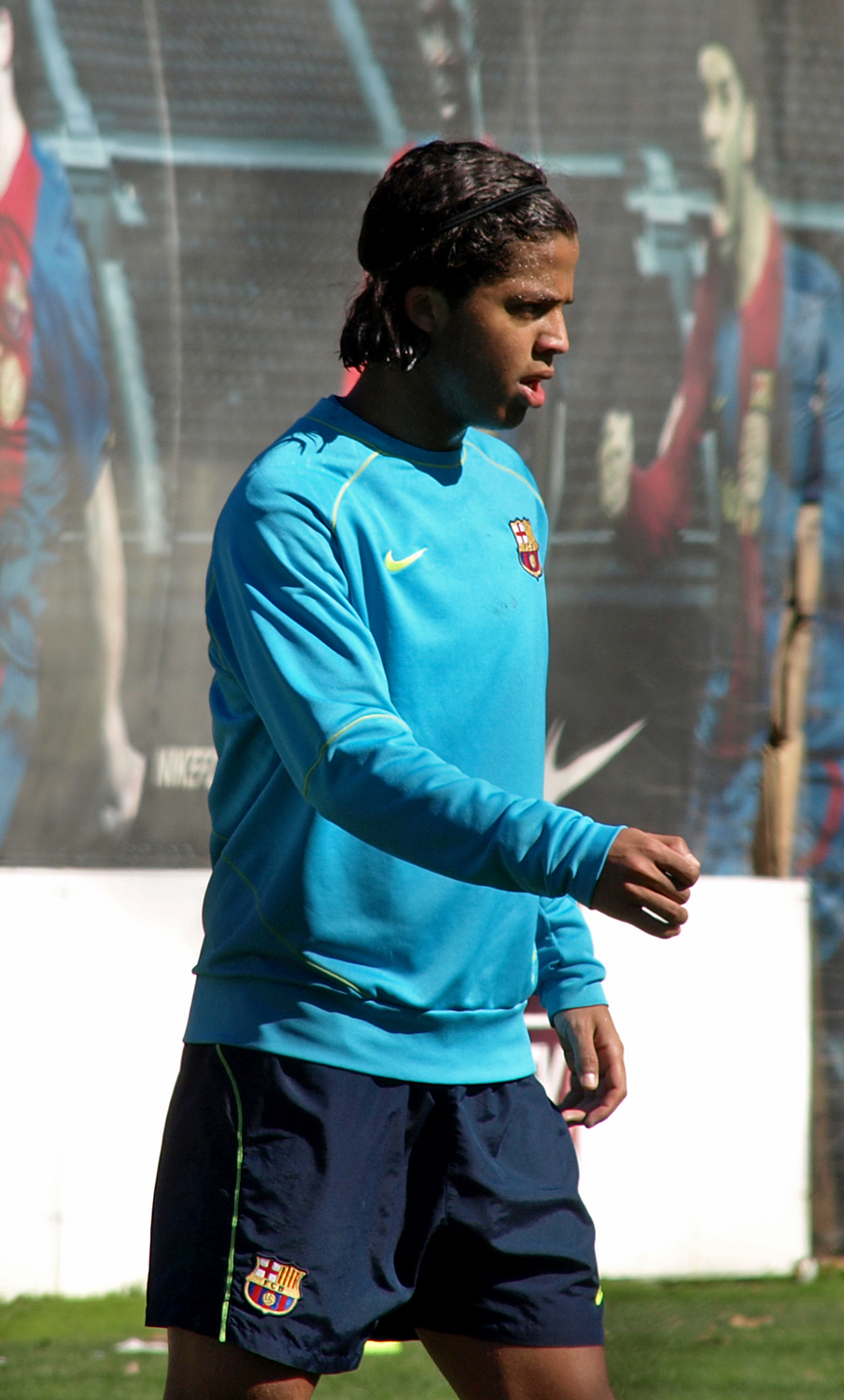
Giovani dos Santos made 18 appearances for the Galatasaray.

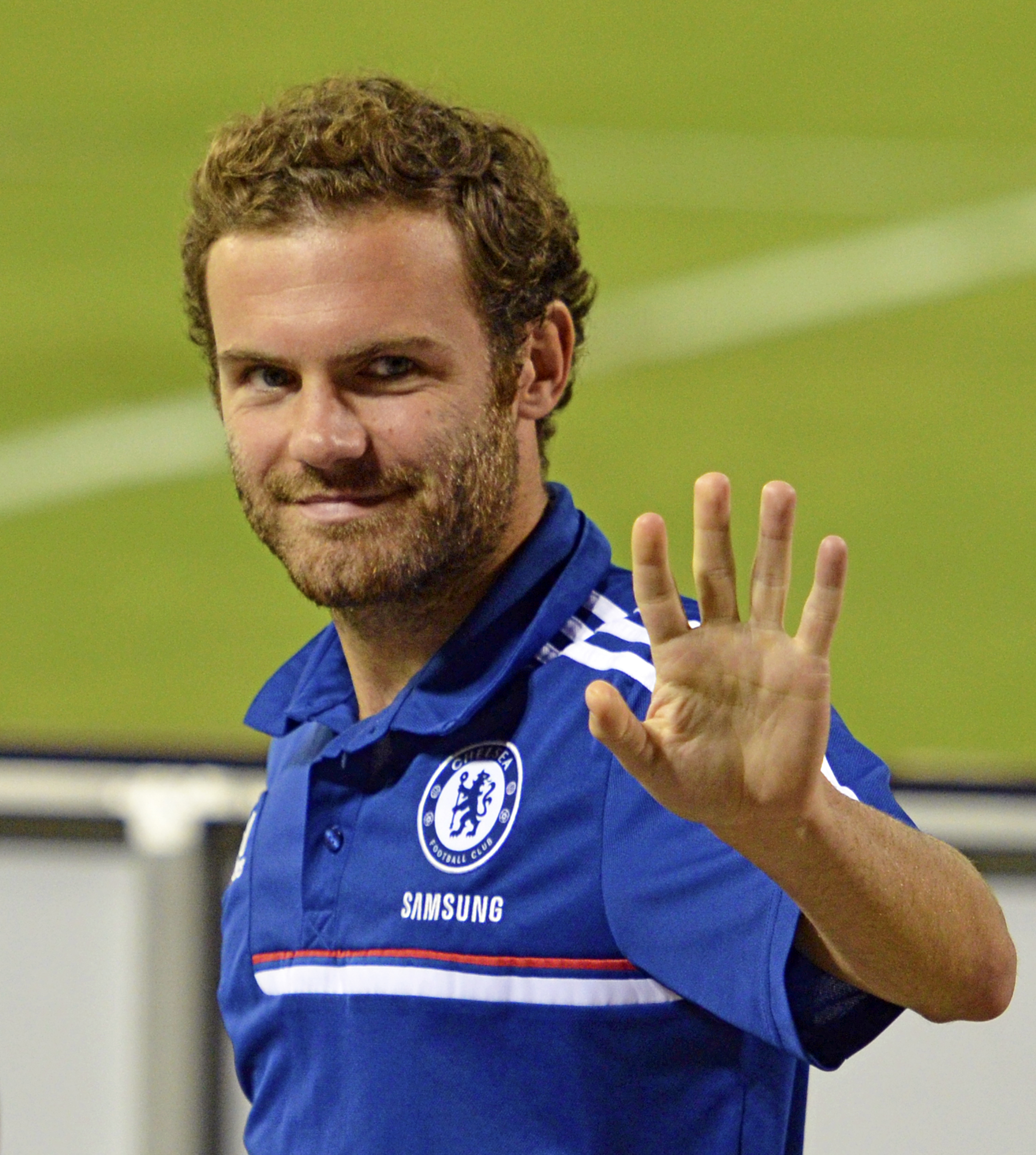
Juan Mata made 18 appearances for the Galatasaray.

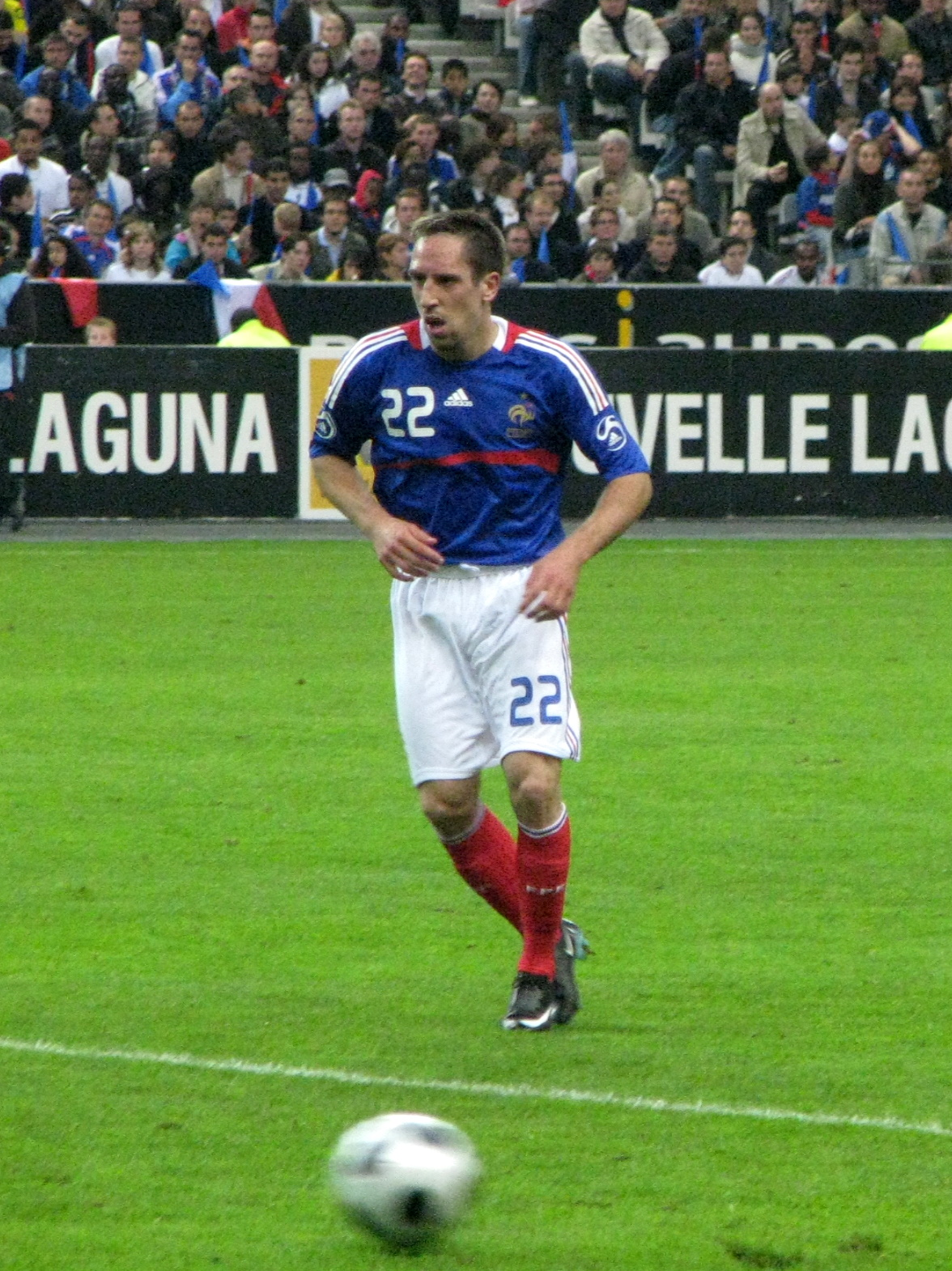
Franck Ribéry made 17 appearances for the Galatasaray.

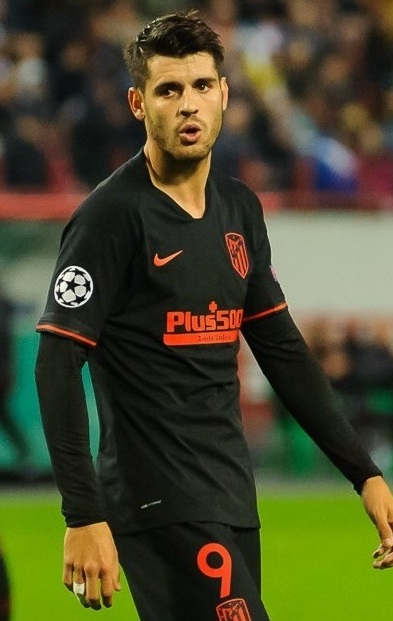
Álvaro Morata made 16 appearances for the Galatasaray.

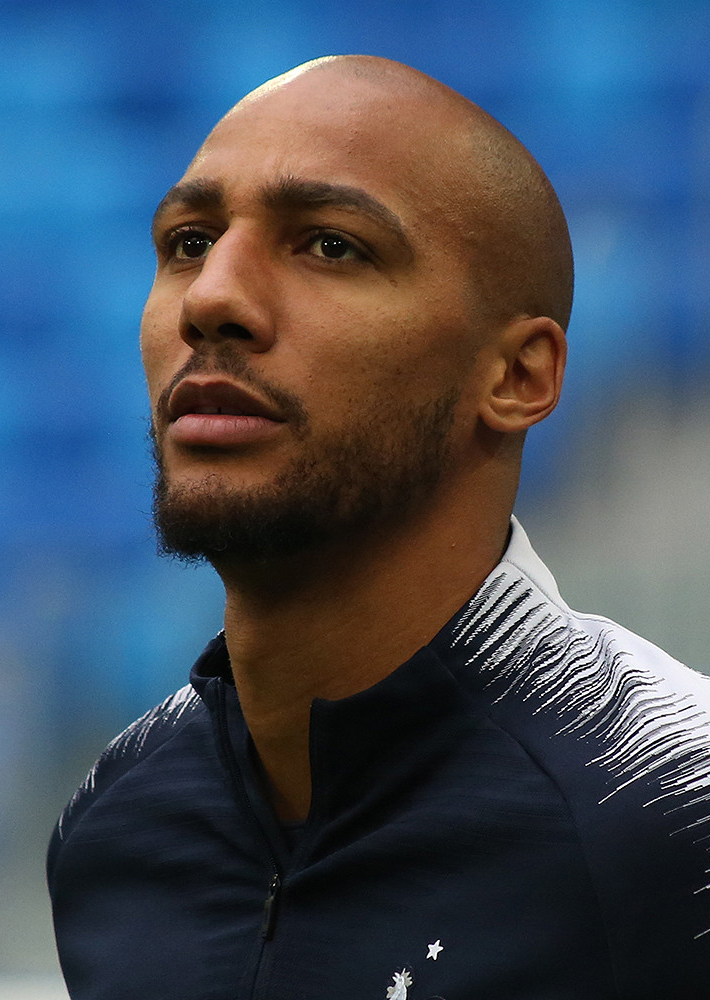
Steven Nzonzi made 15 appearances for the Galatasaray.

List of Galatasaray S.K. players with between 1 and 24 appearances
Name	Nationality	Position	Galatasaray career	Starts	Subs	Total	Goals	Ref(s)
Name	Nationality	Position	Galatasaray career	Appearances			Goals	Ref(s)
Marek Heinz	Czech Republic	FW	2005–2006	16	8	24	4	
Nigel de Jong	Netherlands	MF	2016–2018	17	7	24	1	
Marcelo Carrusca	Argentina	MF	2006–2009	13	11	24	2	
Levent Erköse	Turkey	FW	1984–1985	19	5	24	4	
Hasan Moralı	Turkey	MF	1978–1982	16	8	24	0	
Tuncer İnceler	Turkey	DF	1965–1969	23	1	24	0	
İlhan Selçuk İstinyeli	Turkey	DF	1946–1950	24	0	24	0	
Rasih Minkari	Turkey	FW	1932–1935, 1945–1946	24	0	24	6	
Şakir Baruer	Turkey	MF	1925–1933	24	0	24	2	
Burak Akdiş	Turkey	FW	1998–2000	4	19	23	5	
Frank de Boer	Netherlands	DF	2003–2004	23	0	23	1	
Ferhat Öztorun	Turkey	DF	2005–2007	17	6	23	0	
Erkan Ültanır	Turkey	FW	1985–1987	19	4	23	2	
Onursal Uraz	Turkey	MF	1967–1968	20	3	23	0	
José Rodríguez	Spain	MF	2015–2016	14	9	23	0	
Metehan Baltacı	Turkey	DF	2022–	9	13	22	0	
Tobias Linderoth	Sweden	MF	2007–2010	15	7	22	1	
Tolunay Kafkas	Turkey	MF	1998–2000	9	13	22	1	
Mustafa Denizli	Turkey	FW	1983–1984	16	6	22	5	
Dursun Ali Baran	Turkey	DF	1958–1961	19	3	22	0	
Sacit Öğet	Turkey	GK	1935–1939	22	0	22	0	
Fahir Bekdik	Turkey	MF	1933–1936	22	0	22	0	
Veysel Sarı	Turkey	DF	2013–2015	18	3	21	1	
Emin Bayram	Turkey	DF	2019–2024	11	9	20	0	
Omar Elabdellaoui	Norway	DF	2020–2022	17	3	20	0	
Felipe Jorge Loureiro	Brazil	MF	2002	13	7	20	2	
Ömer Erdoğan	Turkey	DF	2003–2004	16	4	20	2	
Roger Ljung	Sweden	FW	1993–1994	19	1	20	2	
Blerim Džemaili	Switzerland	MF	2014–2015	14	6	20	1	
Salim Cavunt	Turkey	FW	1945–1946, 1957–1959	20	0	20	3	
Hüseyin Şakir	Turkey	MF	1929–1938	20	0	20	0	
Rasim Atala	Turkey	GK	1926–1934	20	0	20	0	
Noa Lang	Netherlands	MF	2026	11	8	19	2	
Angeliño	Spain	DF	2023–2024	17	2	19	1	
Emiliano Insúa	Argentina	DF	2010–2011	14	5	19	0	
Emmanuel Culio	Argentina	MF	2011–2013	18	1	19	4	
Osman Akyol	Turkey	MF	1985–1996	8	11	19	0	
Torsten Gütschow	Germany	FW	1992–1993	16	3	19	12	
Ahmet Celovic	Turkey	FW	1968–1970	10	9	19	6	
Recep Öngör	Turkey	FW	1950–1952	19	0	19	5	
Kemal Öngü	Turkey	MF	1941–1944	19	0	19	0	
Derrick Köhn	Germany	DF	2024–2025	19	0	19	1	
Barbaros Olcayto	Turkey	FW	1940–1943	19	0	19	5	
Salahattin Buda	Turkey	FW	1933–1938	19	0	19	7	
Kemal Şefik	Turkey	FW	1928–1933	19	0	19	4	
Vahyi Oktay	Turkey	DF	1928–1932	19	0	19	0	
Jesse Sekidika	Nigeria	MF	2020–2022	5	14	19	1	
Juan Mata	Spain	MF	2022–2023	5	13	18	3	
Gedson Fernandes	Portugal	MF	2021	17	1	18	1	
Taner Alpak	Turkey	DF	1990–1992	6	12	18	1	
Suat Usta	Turkey	DF	2002–2004	11	7	18	1	
Çağlar Birinci	Turkey	DF	2010–2013	14	4	18	0	
Yaser Yıldız	Turkey	FW	2008–2009	2	16	18	3	
Giovani dos Santos	Mexico	FW	2010	11	7	18	0	
Muğdat Çelik	Turkey	FW	2018–2019	7	11	18	4	
Garbis Baklaoğlu	Turkey	FW	1949–1951	18	0	18	3	
Ozan Kabak	Turkey	DF	2018–2019	16	2	18	0	
İsmail Çipe	Turkey	GK	2018–2023	15	2	17	0	
Goran Pandev	North Macedonia	FW	2014–2015	13	4	17	7	
Franck Ribéry	France	MF	2005	14	3	17	1	
Hakan Çarkacı	Turkey	FW	1984–1986	4	13	17	2	
Murat Kandil	Turkey	FW	1977–1979	5	12	17	0	
Mustafa Dil	Turkey	FW	1978–1981	7	10	17	0	
Eray İşcan	Turkey	GK	2012–2018	14	3	17	0	
Saim Kaur	Turkey	GK	1940–1945	17	0	17	0	
Emre Mor	Turkey	MF	2019–2020	5	12	17	0	
Jimmy Durmaz	Sweden	MF	2019–2021	4	13	17	0	
Nicolò Zaniolo	Italy	MF	2023–2026	4	12	16	5	
Eyüp Aydın	Germany	MF	2023–	3	13	16	1	
Álvaro Morata	Spain	FW	2025	8	8	16	7	
Cédric Bakambu	Democratic Republic of the Congo	FW	2023–2024	2	14	16	2	
Alpaslan Öztürk	Turkey	DF	2021–2023	10	6	16	1	
Ismaël Bouzid	Algeria	DF	2007–2008	9	7	16	1	
Bogdan Stancu	Romania	FW	2010–2011	14	2	16	3	
Feridun Öztürk	Turkey	FW	1969–1970	13	3	16	2	
Bülent Eralp	Turkey	FW	1952–1953	16	0	16	5	
Mahmut Kefeli	Turkey	DF	1942–1948	16	0	16	4	
Mustafa Pekin	Turkey	MF	1937–1938	16	0	16	0	
Finlandiyalı Hayrullah	Turkey	MF	1935–1937	16	0	16	0	
Przemysław Frankowski	Poland	MF	2025–	11	4	15	0	
Christian Corrêa Dionisio	Brazil	FW	2002–2003	11	4	15	3	
Mehmet Polat	Turkey	DF	2002–2003	11	4	15	1	
Ali Lukunku	Democratic Republic of the Congo	FW	2002–2004	11	4	15	6	
Jô	Brazil	FW	2009–2010	9	6	15	3	
Steven Nzonzi	France	MF	2019–2020	15	0	15	0	
Iasmin Latovlevici	Romania	DF	2017–2018	11	4	15	0	
Mehmet Gönülaçar	Turkey	MF	1997–1998	0	15	15	3	
Soner Tolungüç	Turkey	DF	1992–1994	7	8	15	1	
İsmail Yönder	Turkey	MF	1940–1946	15	0	15	0	
Ulvi Yenal	Turkey	GK	1925–1933	15	0	15	0	
Münevver Epirden	Turkey	FW	1934–1935	15	0	15	5	
Ercüment Işıl	Turkey	FW	1926–1931	15	0	15	7	
Aleksey Batrakov	Russia	MF	2026–	11	3	14	6	
Carlos Vinícius	Brazil	FW	2024	2	12	14	2	
Haim Revivo	Israel	FW	2002–2003	11	3	14	3	
Murat Erdoğan	Turkey	MF	2002–2004	7	7	14	3	
Mehmet Yozgatlı	Turkey	MF	1999–2000	2	12	14	1	
Saffet Akyüz	Turkey	FW	1999–2000	3	11	14	1	
Elvir Bolić	Bosnia and Herzegovina	FW	1992	7	7	14	2	
Adrian Knup	Switzerland	FW	1996	10	4	14	2	
Cenk Gönen	Turkey	GK	2015–2017	14	0	14	0	
Benan Öney	Turkey	FW	1963–1964	13	1	14	0	
Yusuf Bahadır	Turkey	MF	1935–1940	14	0	14	0	
Oğuz Aydoğdu	Turkey	FW	1979–1980	10	4	14	1	
Haris Seferovic	Switzerland	FW	2022–2023	7	6	13	2	
Radu Niculescu	Romania	FW	2002	3	10	13	4	
Emrah Eren	Turkey	DF	1999–2000	1	12	13	0	
Ali Turan	Turkey	DF	2010–2011	9	4	13	0	
Gabriel Tamaș	Romania	DF	2003–2004	12	1	13	0	
Luis Pedro Cavanda	Belgium	DF	2016–2017	7	6	13	0	
Varol Ürkmez	Turkey	GK	1967–1970	11	2	13	0	
İlhan Geliş	Turkey	FW	1961–1963	13	0	13	0	
Rıza Köprülü	Turkey	MF	1932–1939	13	0	13	0	
Mehmet Yılmaz	Turkey	FW	1937–1939	13	0	13	4	
Ahmed Robenson	Turkey	GK	1906–1913	13	0	13	0	
Celâl İbrahim Bey	Ottoman Empire	MF	1906–1913	13	0	13	5	
Bekir Sıtkı Bircan	Turkey	DF	1906–1913	13	0	13	0	
Emin Bülend Serdaroğlu	Turkey	FW	1906–1913	13	0	13	5	
Fatih Öztürk	Turkey	GK	2020–2022	13	0	13	0	
Arda Ünyay	Turkey	DF	2025–	3	9	12	0	
Cihat Arslan	Turkey	DF	1993–1995	7	5	12	1	
Abel Xavier	Portugal	DF	2003	12	0	12	0	
Cris	Brazil	DF	2012	11	1	12	1	
Sinan Bolat	Turkey	GK	2014–2015	12	0	12	0	
Róbinson Zapata	Colombia	GK	2011	12	0	12	0	
Izet Hajrović	Bosnia and Herzegovina	MF	2014	7	5	12	1	
Barry Venison	England	DF	1995	12	0	12	0	
Hüseyin Güler	Turkey	FW	1952–1953	12	0	12	1	
Hızır Hantal	Turkey	GK	1933–1941	12	0	12	0	
Mehmet Nazif Gerçin	Turkey	DF	1925–1929	12	0	12	0	
Kemal Rıfat Kalpakçıoğlu	Turkey	DF	1919–1927	12	0	12	0	
Florin Andone	Romania	FW	2019–2020	8	4	12	2	
Aytaç Kara	Turkey	MF	2021–2022	4	8	12	0	
Renato Nhaga	Guinea-Bissau	MF	2026–	3	8	11	2	
Rafael Leão	Portugal	MF	2026–	6	5	11	2	
Efe Akman	Turkey	MF	2023–2025	2	9	11	0	
Erick Pulgar	Chile	MF	2022	7	4	11	0	
Mohamed Sarr	Senegal	DF	2002–2003	8	3	11	2	
Tolga Seyhan	Turkey	DF	2006–2007	9	2	11	0	
Altan Aksoy	Turkey	MF	2005–2006	6	5	11	1	
Mehmet Batdal	Turkey	FW	2010–2012	2	9	11	1	
Rauf Kılıç	Turkey	DF	1982–1984	5	6	11	2	
Ahmet Genç	Turkey	FW	1981–1982	7	4	11	0	
Yılmaz Yavman	Turkey	FW	1974–1975	9	2	11	0	
Selçuk Hergül	Turkey	FW	1961–1962	11	0	11	3	
Hidayet Öztekin	Turkey	MF	1969–1970	7	4	11	0	
Yıldırım Benayyat	Turkey	FW	1959–1972	5	6	11	0	
Turgan Ece	Turkey	MF	1944–1946	11	0	11	0	
Hasan Basri Bey	Ottoman Empire	MF	1906–1911	11	0	11	0	
Stevica Kuzmanovski	Yugoslavia	DF	1994	9	1	10	0	
Ünal Atay	Turkey	MF	1956–1959	9	1	10	0	
Bülent	Turkey	FW	1946–1948	10	0	10	2	
Tevfik Baha	Turkey	DF	1932–1934	10	0	10	0	
Ali Hamurcuoğlu	Turkey	FW	1982–1983	5	5	10	0	
Deniz Gül	Turkey	FW	2026–	4	6	10	1	
Yáser Asprilla	Colombia	MF	2026	3	6	9	0	
Carlos Cuesta	Colombia	DF	2025–	7	2	9	0	
Zvjezdan Misimović	Bosnia and Herzegovina	MF	2010–2011	8	1	9	0	
Yiğit Gökoğlan	Turkey	MF	2011–2014	0	9	9	1	
Kostas Mitroglou	Greece	FW	2019	3	6	9	2	
Mehmet Duymazer	Turkey	GK	1995–1997	9	0	9	0	
Dominic Iorfa	Nigeria	FW	1991–1992	1	8	9	0	
Mustafa Cevlan	Turkey	GK	1979–1980	9	0	9	0	
Bahattin Saykaloğlu	Turkey	MF	1981–1983	3	6	9	1	
Ertan Adatepe	Turkey	FW	1958–1960	9	0	9	1	
Zühtü Merter	Turkey	FW	1958–1960	9	0	9	2	
Necdet Erdem	Turkey	GK	1946–1948	9	0	9	0	
Zeki Egeli	Turkey	MF	1945–1947	9	0	9	1	
Lesley Ugochukwu	France	MF	2026–	0	8	8	0	
Iñaki Peña	Spain	GK	2022	8	0	8	0	
Sergio Almaguer	Mexico	DF	2002	8	0	8	0	
Ceyhun Eriş	Turkey	MF	1995–1998	1	7	8	0	
Alper Tezcan	Turkey	DF	1998–2000	8	0	8	0	
Murat Sözkesen	Turkey	FW	2001–2002	3	5	8	1	
Özgür Can Özcan	Turkey	FW	2005–2007	1	7	8	1	
Alparslan Erdem	Turkey	DF	2008–2010	3	5	8	0	
Jem Karacan	Turkey	MF	2015–2016	4	4	8	1	
Eyüp Taş	Turkey	DF	1979–1980	6	2	8	0	
Tuncay Soyak	Turkey	MF	1986–1987	8	0	8	0	
Tufan	Turkey	DF	1981–1982	5	3	8	0	
Bilgin Nesil	Turkey	FW	1969–1970	5	3	8	0	
Harun Kaya	Turkey	MF	1969–1970	3	5	8	0	
Bülent Varol	Turkey	FW	1950–1951	8	0	8	2	
Korhan Tugay	Turkey	FW	1946–1947	8	0	8	2	
Asım Bey	Turkey	DF	1928–1933	8	0	8	0	
Celal Şefik	Turkey	FW	1929–1933	8	0	8	4	
Necip Şahin Erson	Turkey	FW	1918–1924	8	0	8	2	
Gökay Güney	Turkey	DF	2018–2023	4	4	8	0	
Gökdeniz Gürpüz	Turkey	MF	2023–2026	3	4	7	0	
Ali Yavuz Kol	Turkey	FW	2018–2022	1	6	7	0	
Serdar Özkan	Turkey	MF	2010–2011	5	2	7	0	
Abdullah Ercan	Turkey	DF	2003–2004	2	5	7	0	
Furkan Ölçer	Turkey	DF	1974–1977, 1980–1981	4	3	7	0	
Atalay Babacan	Turkey	MF	2018–2023	2	5	7	1	
Fevzi Kezan	Turkey	FW	1975–1977	5	2	7	0	
Tatomir Radunović	Yugoslavia	GK	1967–1968	6	1	7	0	
Cengiz Erkazan	Turkey	FW	1970–1973	4	3	7	1	
Salih Dursun	Turkey	DF	2013–2017	3	4	7	0	
Erol Yanık	Turkey	FW	1962–1963	7	0	7	0	
Faruk Özceylan	Turkey	GK	1967–1968	4	3	7	0	
Muzaffer Tuğ	Turkey	MF	1932–1934	7	0	7	1	
Muammer Çakınay	Turkey	MF	1928–1931	7	0	7	1	
Sedat Cömert	Turkey	FW	1954–1955	7	0	7	1	
Fuad Hüsnü Kayacan	Turkey	FW	1909–1911	7	0	7	0	
Dalaklı Hüseyin	Turkey	DF	1906–1911	7	0	7	0	
İdris Bey	Ottoman Empire	FW	1909–1911	7	0	7	1	
Celil Yüksel	Turkey	MF	2018–2020	3	3	6	0	
Alp Küçükvardar	Turkey	FW	1996–1997	2	4	6	1	
Benhur Babaoğlu	Turkey	FW	1992–1994	1	5	6	0	
Umut Gündoğan	Turkey	MF	2013–2015	3	3	6	0	
Jusuf Hatunic	Yugoslavia	DF	1978–1979	6	0	6	0	
Nurettin Yılmaz	Turkey	FW	1976–1977	5	1	6	0	
Ural Metiner	Turkey	MF	1967–1968	4	2	6	0	
Bosko Kajganic	Yugoslavia	GK	1977–1978	6	0	6	0	
Faruk Aktaş	Turkey	DF	1976–1977	6	0	6	0	
Yılmaz Pamuk	Turkey	GK	1975–1977	5	1	6	0	
Berk İsmail Ünsal	Turkey	FW	2013–2017	3	3	6	0	
Erdoğan Gökçen	Turkey	FW	1962–1964	6	0	6	1	
Faik Soydaner	Turkey	FW	1951–1952	5	1	6	1	
Hidayet Volga	Turkey	DF	1952–1952	6	0	6	0	
Hikmet Demir	Turkey	FW	1949–1951	6	0	6	1	
Samim Ankara	Turkey	GK	1949–1951	6	0	6	0	
Mustafa Soyak	Turkey	FW	1949–1950	6	0	6	0	
Hicri Yüce	Turkey	MF	1935–1938	6	0	6	1	
Nubar Hamamcıyan	Turkey	FW	1936–1939	6	0	6	0	
Adnan Bindal	Turkey	FW	1933–1936	6	0	6	1	
Ahmet Cevat Bey	Ottoman Empire	DF	1912–1923	6	0	6	0	
Milija and Pavle Bakić	Principality of Montenegro	DF	1906–1910	6	0	6	0	
Sam Adekugbe	Canada	DF	2023	6	0	6	0	
Ali Turap Bülbül	Turkey	DF	2023–2026	1	4	5	0	
Yalçın Ayhan	Turkey	DF	2005–2006	4	1	5	0	
Zafer Şakar	Turkey	MF	2004–2006	0	5	5	0	
Ion Ionuț Luțu	Romania	MF	1998	5	0	5	0	
İhsan Okay	Turkey	DF	1987–1989	4	1	5	0	
Selçuk Yula	Turkey	FW	1991–1992	2	3	5	1	
Ziya Yıldız	Turkey	FW	1988–1990	1	4	5	0	
Ümit Özkalp	Turkey	FW	1980–1981	3	2	5	0	
Adnan Aydın	Turkey	DF	1982–1986	2	3	5	0	
Reşit Güner	Turkey	FW	1980–1981	3	2	5	2	
Ertan Gürkan	Turkey	DF	1965–1966	5	0	5	0	
Mustafa Aksoy	Turkey	FW	1965–1966	5	0	5	0	
Necdet Atsüren	Turkey	MF	1964–1965	5	0	5	0	
Cenap Doruk	Turkey	FW	1959–1961	5	0	5	0	
Vladimir Nikolovski	Yugoslavia	FW	1966–1968	5	0	5	0	
Bülent Şahinkaya	Turkey	MF	1975–1976	4	1	5	0	
Serdar Gücüyener	Turkey	FW	1975–1976	5	0	5	0	
Hilmi Ok	Turkey	FW	1953–1954	5	0	5	0	
İstepan Variyant	Turkey	DF	1949–1950	5	0	5	0	
Nazım Kayar	Turkey	FW	1945–1946	5	0	5	2	
Necmi Ungan	Turkey	GK	1937–1938	5	0	5	0	
Bülent Davran	Turkey	MF	1932–1937	5	0	5	0	
Müçteba Remzi	Turkey	MF	1930–1931	5	0	5	0	
Sadi Karsan	Turkey	FW	1918–1920	5	0	5	2	
Todor Bojkoff	Bulgaria	DF	1909–1911	5	0	5	0	
Rowland Rees	United Kingdom	FW	1909–1911	5	0	5	0	
Steryo	Bulgaria	FW	1909–1911	5	0	5	0	
Kerim Özdor	Turkey	DF	1923–1928	5	0	5	0	
Emre Can Coşkun	Turkey	DF	2013–2015	2	3	5	0	
Lucas Ontivero	Argentina	FW	2013–2014	2	3	5	0	
Berat Luş	Turkey	MF	2024–	0	4	4	0	
Serge Aurier	Ivory Coast	DF	2024	1	3	4	0	
Cafercan Aksu	Turkey	MF	2003–2005	0	4	4	0	
Erhan Namlı	Turkey	MF	2001–2002	0	4	4	0	
Emrah Umut	Turkey	DF	2003–2004	3	1	4	0	
Guillermo Burdisso	Argentina	DF	2013–2014	3	1	4	0	
Adnan İlgin	Turkey	DF	1997–1998	4	0	4	0	
Mike Marsh	England	DF	1995	4	0	4	0	
Rıza Tuyuran	Turkey	FW	1984–1985	4	0	4	0	
Barbaros Erdem	Turkey	FW	1984–1985	1	3	4	0	
Ömer Sağlam	Turkey	DF	1982–1983	4	0	4	0	
Altay Yavuzarslan	Turkey	GK	1962–1963	4	0	4	0	
Cemil Gümüşdere	Turkey	DF	1959–1960	4	0	4	0	
Erdem Arat	Turkey	GK	1964–1965	4	0	4	0	
Metin Kınay	Turkey	DF	1956–1957	4	0	4	0	
Hilmi Ecer	Turkey	MF	1946–1950	4	0	4	0	
Ahmet Yavaşoğlu	Turkey	FW	1945–1946	4	0	4	1	
Fazıl Peker	Turkey	GK	1938–1939	4	0	4	0	
Murat Poyraz	Turkey	FW	1938–1939	4	0	4	0	
Bekir Arun	Turkey	MF	1934–1936	4	0	4	0	
Cafer Akyaz	Turkey	FW	1934–1935	4	0	4	1	
Doğan Akagündüz	Turkey	FW	1933–1934	4	0	4	0	
Necdet Olcay	Turkey	FW	1932–1936	3	1	4	0	
Sabahattin	Turkey	GK	1935–1936	4	0	4	0	
Turhan	Turkey	FW	1940–1946	4	0	4	0	
Adil Giray	Turkey	GK	1919–1920	4	0	4	0	
Hüseyin Eden	Turkey	DF	1912–1920	4	0	4	0	
Hayri Gönen	Turkey	MF	1922–1926	4	0	4	0	
Sabri Mahir	Ottoman Empire	MF	1909–1910	4	0	4	0	
Horace Armitage	England	MF	1908–1911	4	0	4	0	
Birhan Vatansever	Turkey	MF	2014–2017	1	3	4	0	
Volkan Pala	Turkey	FW	2015–2016	0	4	4	0	
Recep Gül	Turkey	MF	2017–2019	1	3	4	0	
Ada Yüzgeç	Turkey	FW	2026–	0	3	3	0	
Batuhan Şen	Turkey	GK	2018–2026	0	3	3	0	
Hamza Akman	Turkey	MF	2022–2024	0	3	3	1	
Baran Aksaka	Turkey	MF	2022–2025	0	3	3	0	
Cengizhan Hınçal	Turkey	MF	1993–1994	0	3	3	0	
Fevzi Elmas	Turkey	GK	2004–2007	1	2	3	0	
Erman Kılıç	Turkey	MF	2013–2014	0	3	3	0	
Pavel Horvath	Czech Republic	MF	2001–2002	1	2	3	0	
Ferdi Elmas	Turkey	MF	2008–2009	1	2	3	0	
Ahmed Barusso	Ghana	MF	2007–2008	1	2	3	1	
Furkan Özçal	Turkey	MF	2012–2015	1	2	3	0	
Serdar Eylik	Turkey	MF	2009–2010	2	1	3	0	
Çetin Güngör	Turkey	MF	2009–2010	0	3	3	0	
Ergun Ortakçı	Turkey	MF	1977–1978	0	3	3	0	
Necmi	Turkey	FW	1984–1985	0	3	3	0	
Vefa Yamanoğlu	Turkey	FW	1981–1982	0	3	3	0	
Faruk Uçarlar	Turkey	MF	1969–1970	3	0	3	0	
Atılay Özgür	Turkey	FW	1968–1969	0	3	3	1	
Anıl Dilaver	Turkey	FW	2010–2011	2	1	3	1	
Emrah Başsan	Turkey	MF	2017–2018	1	2	3	1	
Cemal Bulgurcuoğlu	Turkey	GK	1952–1954	3	0	3	0	
Şükrü Gülesin	Turkey	FW	1953–1954	3	0	3	0	
Varujan Arslanyan	Turkey	FW	1949–1950	3	0	3	0	
İlyas Zorlu	Turkey	FW	1943–1944	3	0	3	4	
Talat Özışık	Turkey	MF	1940–1941	3	0	3	0	
Şevket Bulat	Turkey	MF	1936–1937	3	0	3	2	
Şemsi Abdi	Turkey	FW	1933–1935	3	0	3	0	
İbrahim Bey	Turkey	MF	1928–1930	3	0	3	0	
Rıfat Alper	Turkey	FW	1928–1930	3	0	3	0	
Vedat Abut	Turkey	FW	1926–1930	3	0	3	1	
Ali Gençay	Turkey	DF	1922–1926	3	0	3	0	
Yücel Özkan	Turkey	DF	1985–1986	1	2	3	0	
Highton	United Kingdom	FW	1909–1911	3	0	3	0	
Nüzhet Öniş	Turkey	GK	1922–1924	3	0	3	0	
Edip Ossa	Turkey	MF	1922–1924	3	0	3	0	
Ali Tümay	Turkey	FW	1906–1911	3	0	3	0	
Adnan İbrahim Piroğlu	Turkey	DF	1909	3	0	3	0	
Kerem Çalışkan	Turkey	FW	2016–2017	1	2	3	0	
Can Armando Güner	Argentina	MF	2026–	0	2	2	0	
Yusuf Dağhan Kahraman	Turkey	DF	2026–	0	2	2	0	
Baran Demiroğlu	Turkey	FW	2023–	0	2	2	0	
Mathias Ross	Denmark	DF	2022–2025	2	0	2	1	
Işık Kaan Arslan	Turkey	DF	2021–2024	1	1	2	0	
Sedat Debreli	Turkey	MF	2002–2003	1	1	2	0	
Cédric Carrasso	France	GK	2017–2018	2	0	2	0	
Hakan Yakin	Switzerland	MF	2004–2005	0	2	2	0	
Oğuz Sabankay	Turkey	MF	2006–2007	0	2	2	0	
Bruno Quadros	Brazil	DF	1999–2000	2	0	2	0	
Kadir Çattık	Turkey	FW	1985–1986	2	0	2	0	
Erdal	Turkey	DF	1984–1985	2	0	2	0	
Sabahattin İspirli	Turkey	FW	1983–1984	1	1	2	0	
Oral Keçelioğlu	Turkey	FW	1955–1955	1	1	2	0	
Erol Gürmen	Turkey	FW	1963–1964	2	0	2	0	
Sedat Günertem	Turkey	GK	1959–1960	2	0	2	0	
Resad Kunovac	Yugoslavia	FW	1978–1979	2	0	2	0	
Necdet Mizanoğlu	Turkey	MF	1953–1954	2	0	2	0	
Osman Tuğaltay	Turkey	FW	1953–1954	2	0	2	2	
Müfit Kalyoncu	Turkey	FW	1952	2	0	2	0	
Halil Şenal	Turkey	FW	1949–1950	2	0	2	0	
Natık	Turkey	DF	1947–1948	2	0	2	0	
Refii Erkal	Turkey	FW	1932–1933	2	0	2	0	
Nino Sarrafyan	Turkey	FW	1939–1941	2	0	2	1	
Enis Bey	Turkey	FW	1933–1934	2	0	2	1	
Fethi Bey	Turkey	FW	1932–1936	2	0	2	1	
Sabri Gençay	Turkey	FW	1938–1939	2	0	2	0	
Cengiz Sökmen	Turkey	GK	1985–1986	0	2	2	0	
Ljubomir Milic	Yugoslavia	MF	1971–1972	0	2	2	0	
Tahir Karacan	Turkey	FW	1974–1975	0	2	2	0	
Lasklo Lerinc	Yugoslavia	FW	1978–1979	1	1	2	0	
Arkın Tanman	Turkey	DF	1985–1986	2	0	2	0	
Hasan Reis	Turkey	FW	1985–1986	0	2	2	0	
Halil Burnaz	Turkey	MF	1937–1938	2	0	2	0	
Muhtar Tuncaltan	Turkey	MF	1951	2	0	2	3	
Kemal Nejat	Turkey	FW	1919–1924	2	0	2	0	
Javalı Abdülmuttalip	Indonesia	DF	1906–1907	2	0	2	0	
Mazhar Bey	Ottoman Empire	DF	1906–1907	2	0	2	0	
Boris Nikolof	Bulgaria	FW	1906–1907	2	0	2	1	
Saim Bey	Ottoman Empire	MF	1918–1920	2	0	2	0	
Yusuf Ziya Öniş	Turkey	FW	1918–1920	2	0	2	0	
Ali Sami Yen	Turkey	MF	1910–1911	2	0	2	0	
Arif Soydan	Turkey	FW	1922–1923	2	0	2	0	
Neşet Bey	Ottoman Empire	DF	1910–1913	2	0	2	0	
Gustavo Assunção	Brazil	MF	2021–2022	1	1	2	0	
Şadi Şadli Alioğlu	Turkey	FW	1925–1929	2	0	2	3	
Muhtar Bey	Turkey	MF	1926–1928	2	0	2	0	
Barış Zeren	Turkey	MF	2017–2018	0	2	2	0	
Bartuğ Elmaz	Turkey	MF	2020–2022	0	2	2	0	
El Chadaille Bitshiabu	France	DF	2026–	0	1	1	0	
Jankat Yılmaz	Turkey	GK	2018–	1	0	1	0	
Furkan Koçak	Turkey	MF	2026–	0	1	1	0	
Kadir Subaşı	Turkey	DF	2022–	0	1	1	0	
Ali Yeşilyurt	Turkey	DF	2023–	0	1	1	0	
Berk Balaban	Turkey	GK	2021–2024	0	1	1	0	
Ahmet Görkem Görk	Turkey	DF	2002–2003	0	1	1	0	
İlker Erbay	Turkey	DF	2002–2003	1	0	1	0	
Klodian Duro	Albania	MF	2002–2003	0	1	1	0	
Ümit Aydın	Turkey	MF	2000–2001	0	1	1	0	
Gürol Azer	Turkey	DF	1999–2000	0	1	1	0	
Yücel Çolak	Turkey	FW	1990–1991	1	0	1	0	
Seyfettin Kurtulmuş	Turkey	MF	1992–1993	0	1	1	0	
İsmail Göksel Şenyüz	Turkey	DF	1995–1996	0	1	1	0	
Mülayim Erdem	Turkey	MF	2003–2004	0	1	1	0	
Richard Kingson	Turkey	GK	2003–2004	1	0	1	0	
Uğur Demirok	Turkey	DF	2005–2006	0	1	1	0	
Uğur Akdemir	Turkey	DF	2006–2007	0	1	1	0	
Erhan Şentürk	Turkey	MF	2008–2009	0	1	1	0	
Murat Akça	Turkey	DF	2008–2009	1	0	1	0	
Cem Sultan	Turkey	FW	2010–2011	0	1	1	0	
Musa Çağıran	Turkey	MF	2010–2011	0	1	1	0	
Berkin Kamil Arslan	Turkey	MF	2009–2010	0	1	1	0	
Robert Spehar	Croatia	FW	2001–2002	0	1	1	0	
Cumhur Yılmaztürk	Turkey	MF	2009–2010	1	0	1	0	
Berk Neziroğluları	Turkey	DF	2009–2010	0	1	1	0	
Zekir Keskin	Turkey	MF	1990–1991	0	1	1	0	
Mehmet Durmaz	Turkey	DF	1987–1988	0	1	1	0	
Tolga Eriş	Turkey	FW	1991–1992	0	1	1	0	
Nasır Vanlıoğlu	Iran	MF	1987–1988	0	1	1	0	
Candemir Yılmam	Turkey	MF	1981–1982	1	0	1	0	
Kadir Özcan	Turkey	DF	1980–1981	1	0	1	0	
Ercan Aktuna	Turkey	DF	1967–1968	1	0	1	0	
Selim Soydan	Turkey	MF	1967–1968	1	0	1	0	
Erdal Akpınar	Turkey	DF	1965–1966	1	0	1	0	
Sabri Dino	Turkey	GK	1959–1960	0	1	1	0	
Mazhar Güremek	Turkey	FW	1964–1965	1	0	1	0	
Yılmaz Şen	Turkey	DF	1967–1968	1	0	1	0	
İsmail Şerbetçigil	Turkey	DF	1964–1965	1	0	1	0	
İsmail Tartan	Turkey	DF	1975–1976	1	0	1	0	
Engin Çınar	Turkey	FW	1977–1978	1	0	1	0	
Hakan Özkazbek	Turkey	MF	1985–1986	1	0	1	0	
Yervant Balcı	Turkey	GK	1966–1967	0	1	1	0	
Mertan Caner Öztürk	Turkey	FW	2011–2012	1	0	1	0	
Berk Yıldız	Turkey	MF	2011–2012	0	1	1	0	
Osman Uçaner	Turkey	GK	1965–1966	0	1	1	0	
Doğan Özdenak	Turkey	GK	1976–1977	1	0	1	0	
Mehmet Aktan	Turkey	DF	1975–1976	1	0	1	0	
İlker Erbay	Turkey	MF	1969–1970	0	1	1	0	
Aydoğan Tunay	Turkey	GK	1964–1965	1	0	1	0	
Yetiş Kaya	Turkey	FW	1974–1975	0	1	1	0	
Naşit Atvur	Turkey	FW	1967–1968	0	1	1	0	
Avram Kalpin	Turkey	FW	1970–1971	0	1	1	0	
Servet Gökçen	Turkey	DF	2002–2003	0	1	1	0	
Erdoğan Çelebi	Turkey	MF	1960–1961	1	0	1	0	
Uğur Öztürkmen	Turkey	DF	1959	0	1	1	0	
Günay Kayarlar	Turkey	MF	1955–1956	1	0	1	0	
Gültekin Gürel	Turkey	DF	1949–1950	1	0	1	0	
Metin Küçükmümin	Turkey	GK	1952–1953	1	0	1	0	
Ahmet Özmete	Turkey	DF	1952	1	0	1	0	
Edmond Danon	Turkey	FW	1949–1950	1	0	1	0	
Kadri Özaral	Turkey	FW	1949–1950	1	0	1	0	
Emel Yerkıvanç	Turkey	MF	1946–1947	1	0	1	0	
Süreyya Görkey	Turkey	FW	1948–1949	1	0	1	0	
Aleksandır Holyafkin	Turkey	FW	1947–1948	1	0	1	0	
Kamuran Olcayto	Turkey	MF	1932–1933	1	0	1	0	
Hakkı Olaç	Turkey	FW	1940–1941	1	0	1	1	
Recep	Turkey	FW	1940–1941	1	0	1	0	
Safa Özyurt	Turkey	GK	1935–1936	0	1	1	0	
Şefik Çakan	Turkey	FW	1937–1938	1	0	1	0	
Refik Tarman	Turkey	DF	1936–1937	1	0	1	0	
Mustafa Faruk	Turkey	FW	1932–1933	1	0	1	0	
Ziya İhsan İsban	Turkey	MF	1929–1930	1	0	1	0	
Sacit Haydar	Turkey	FW	1928–1929	1	0	1	0	
Emil Oberle	Germany	FW	1912–1913	1	0	1	0	
İsmet Uluğ	Turkey	DF	1918–1919	1	0	1	0	
Marek Godlewski	Poland	DF	1991–1992	0	1	1	0	
Okan Derici	Turkey	MF	2011–2012	0	1	1	0	
Eyüp Kaymakçı	Turkey	MF	2003–2004	0	1	1	0	
Ceyhun Müderrisoğlu	Turkey	MF	1999–2000	0	1	1	0	
Vladimir Pejovic	Yugoslavia	MF	1978–1979	1	0	1	0	
Şenol Yiğit	Turkey	MF	1985–1986	1	0	1	0	
Ersan Doğu	Turkey	FW	1996–1997	0	1	1	0	
Ahmet	Turkey	DF	1977–1978	1	0	1	0	
Pierre Esser	Germany	GK	1996–1997	1	0	1	0	
Ceylan Arıkan	Turkey	MF	1990–1991	0	1	1	0	
Talat Alptekin	Turkey	MF	1990–1991	0	1	1	0	
Orhan	Turkey	MF	1985–1986	1	0	1	0	
İlyas	Turkey	DF	1985–1986	1	0	1	0	
Nuri	Turkey	MF	1936–1937	1	0	1	0	
Emin	Turkey	GK	1937–1938	1	0	1	0	
Turan	Turkey	DF	1937–1938	1	0	1	0	
Firuz İrfan	Turkey	FW	1923–1924	1	0	1	1	
Karl Tzöllner	Germany	GK	1918–1919	1	0	1	0	
Reinhard Mayer	Germany	DF	1918–1919	1	0	1	0	
Mehmet Sadi	Ottoman Empire	MF	1918–1919	1	0	1	0	
Kemal Kanguro	Ottoman Empire	FW	1918–1919	1	0	1	0	
Hikmet Topuz	Turkey	FWF	1918–1919	1	0	1	0	
Salahattin Doğan	Turkey	MF	1922–1923	1	0	1	0	
Joseph Oberle	Germany	FW	1912–1913	1	0	1	0	
Muhsin Yeğen	Ottoman Empire	FW	1912–1913	1	0	1	1	
Hasnun Galip	Ottoman Empire	FW	1912–1913	1	0	1	0	
Oğuzhan Kayar	Turkey	MF	2013–2014	1	0	1	0	
Arap Hüsnü Bey	Turkey	FW	1922–1923	1	0	1	0	
Fehmi Ateş	Turkey	FW	1922–1923	1	0	1	0	
George (Jorj)	Germany	DF	1918–1919	1	0	1	0	
İbrahim Coşkun	Turkey	MF	2013–2014	0	1	1	0	
Fazıl Köprülü	Turkey	FW	1919–1920	1	0	1	0	
Sedat Ziya	Turkey	FW	1919–1920	1	0	1	0	
Sadi Kurt	Ottoman Empire	FW	1919–1920	1	0	1	0	
Zeki	Turkey	GK	1945–1946	1	0	1	0	
Emin Bey	Turkey	FW	1926–1927	1	0	1	0	
Abdüş Bey	Turkey	DF	1926–1927	1	0	1	0	
Mustafa Bey	Ottoman Empire	DF	1909–1910	1	0	1	0	
Kaan Baysal	Turkey	MF	2014–2015	0	1	1	0	
Yıldırım	Turkey	MF	1957–1958	1	0	1	0	
Ali Ülgen	Turkey	DF	2017–2018	0	1	1	0	
Abdussamed Karnuçu	Turkey	DF	2018–2019	0	1	1	0	
Malik Karaahmet	Turkey	FW	2018–2019	0	1	1	0	
Mustafa Kapı	Turkey	MF	2018–2020	0	1	1	0	
Erencan Yardımcı	Turkey	FW	2019–2021	0	1	1	0	
Valentine Ozornwafor	Nigeria	DF	2019–2022	0	1	1	0	
