= List of Galatasaray S.K. foreign footballers =

Many many many many have played for Galatasaray since its founding in 1905.

== List of players ==
Players highlighted in bold are still actively playing at Galatasaray.

Information correct as of the match played on 22 November 2026.

Nationality	Name	Position	Gala career	Appearances	Goals	Ref(s)	Notes
Albania	Lorik Cana	Midfielder	2010–2011	31	1		
Algeria	Ismaël Bouzid	Defender	2007–2008	16	1		
Algeria	Sofiane Feghouli	Midfielder	2017–2022	162	34		
Argentina	Marcelo Carrusca	Midfielder	2006–2009	24	2		
Argentina	Leo Franco	Goalkeeper	2009–2010	35	0		
Argentina	Emiliano Insúa	Defender	2010–2011	19	0		
Argentina	Emmanuel Culio	Midfielder	2011–2013	19	4		
Argentina	Guillermo Burdisso	Defender	2013–2014	4	0		
Argentina	Lucas Ontivero	Forward	2013–2014	5	0		
Argentina	Mauro Icardi	Forward	2022–2026	134	77		
Argentina	**Can Armando Güner**	Midfielder	2026–	2	0		
Australia	Harry Kewell	Forward	2008–2011	89	34		
Australia	Lucas Neill	Defender	2009–2011	51	1		
Austria	Yusuf Demir	Midfielder	2022–2026	26	2		
Belgium	Jason Denayer	Defender	2015–2016; 2017–2018	50	0		
Belgium	Luis Pedro Cavanda	Defender	2016–2017	13	0		
Belgium	Dries Mertens	Forward	2022–2025	136	25		
Belgium	Michy Batshuayi	Forward	2024–2025	30	7		
Bosnia and Herzegovina	Elvir Bolić	Forward	1992	14	2		
Bosnia and Herzegovina	Elvir Baljić	Forward	2002–2005	42	3		
Bosnia and Herzegovina	Zvjezdan Misimović	Midfielder	2010–2011	9	0		
Bosnia and Herzegovina	Izet Hajrović	Midfielder	2014	12	1		
Brazil	Cláudio Taffarel	Goalkeeper	1998–2001	144	0		
Brazil	Márcio Mixirica	Forward	1999–2001	47	12		
Brazil	Bruno Quadros	Defender	1999–2000	2	0		
Brazil	Capone	Defender	1999–2002	113	9		
Brazil	Mário Jardel	Forward	2000–2001	43	34		
Brazil	João Batista	Midfielder	2001–2004	65	2		
Brazil	Fábio Pinto	Forward	2002–2004	29	2		
Brazil	Christian Corrêa Dionisio	Forward	2002–2003	15	3		
Brazil	César Prates	Defender	2003–2004	38	6		
Brazil	Flávio Conceição	Midfielder	2004–2005	30	2		
Brazil	Lincoln	Midfielder	2007–2009	65	16		
Brazil	Jô	Forward	2009–2010	15	3		
Brazil	Elano	Midfielder	2009–2011	47	7		
Brazil	Felipe Melo	Midfielder	2011–2015	155	18		
Brazil	Cris	Defender	2012	12	1		
Brazil	Alex Telles	Defender	2014–2016	60	2		
Brazil	Mariano	Defender	2017–2020	105	2		
Brazil	Maicon	Defender	2017–2020	57	6		
Brazil	Fernando	Midfielder	2017–2019	58	4		
Brazil	Marcão	Defender	2019–2022	141	2		
Brazil	Felipe Jorge Loureiro	Midfielder	2020–2022	20	2		
Brazil	Gustavo Assunção	Midfielder	2021–2022	2	0		
Brazil	Tetê	Midfielder	2023–2024	45	3		
Brazil	Carlos Vinícius	Forward	2024	14	2		
Brazil	**Gabriel Sara**	Midfielder	2024–	103	10		
Bulgaria	Boris Nikolof	Forward	1906–1907	2	1		
Bulgaria	Todor Bojkoff	Defender	1909–1911	5	0		
Bulgaria	Steryo	Forward	1909–1911	5	0		
Cameroon	Alioum Saidou	Midfielder	2004–2006	32	0		
Cameroon	Rigobert Song	Defender	2004–2008	135	6		
Cameroon	Dany Nounkeu	Defender	2012–2015	46	0		
Cameroon	Aurélien Chedjou	Defender	2013–2017	119	12		
Canada	Sam Adekugbe	Defender	2023	6	0		
Cape Verde	Garry Rodrigues	Midfielder	2017–2019	78	16		
Chile	Erick Pulgar	Midfielder	2022	11	0		
Colombia	Faryd Mondragón	Goalkeeper	2001–2007	239	0		
Colombia	Gustavo Victoria	Defender	2001–2002	28	1		
Colombia	Juan Pablo Pino	Forward	2010–2013	25	6		
Colombia	Róbinson Zapata	Goalkeeper	2011	12	0		
Colombia	Radamel Falcao	Forward	2019–2021	43	20		
Colombia	**Davinson Sánchez**	Defender	2023–	136	11		
Colombia	**Carlos Cuesta**	Defender	2025–	9	0		
Colombia	Yáser Asprilla	Midfielder	2026	9	0		
Croatia	Stjepan Tomas	Defender	2004–2007	120	1		
Czech Republic	Pavel Horvath	Midfielder	2001–2002	3	0		
Czech Republic	Marek Heinz	Forward	2005–2006	24	4		
Czech Republic	Milan Baroš	Forward	2008–2013	115	61		
Czech Republic	Tomáš Ujfaluši	Defender	2011–2013	42	1		
Denmark	Victor Nelsson	Defender	2021–2026	144	4		
Denmark	Mathias Ross	Defender	2022–2025	2	1		
Denmark	**Elias Jelert**	Defender	2024–	35	1		
DR Congo	Ali Lukunku	Forward	2002–2004	15	6		
DR Congo	Shabani Nonda	Forward	2007–2010	88	38		
DR Congo	Christian Luyindama	Defender	2019–2023	79	5		
DR Congo	Cédric Bakambu	Forward	2023–2024	16	2		
Egypt	Mostafa Mohamed	Forward	2021–2023	58	17		
England	Horace Armitage	Midfielder	1908–1911	4	0		
England	Mike Marsh	Defender	1995	4	0		
England	Barry Venison	Defender	1995	12	0		
France	Didier Six	Forward	1987–1988	25	3		
France	Sébastien Pérez	Defender	2001–2002	33	4		
France	Franck Ribéry	Midfielder	2005	17	1		
France	Lionel Carole	Defender	2015–2018	66	1		
France	Bafétimbi Gomis	Forward	2017–2018; 2022–2023	86	51		
France	Cédric Carrasso	Goalkeeper	2017–2018	2	0		
France	Steven Nzonzi	Midfielder	2019–2020	15	0		
France	Sacha Boey	Defender	2021–2024; 2026	100	6		
France	Léo Dubois	Defender	2022–2024	31	1		
France	Tanguy Ndombele	Midfielder	2023–2024	26	0		
France	**Lesley Ugochukwu**	Midfielder	2026–	8	0		
Gabon	**Mario Lemina**	Midfielder	2019–2020; 2025–	97	6		
Germany	Rüdiger Abramczik	Forward	1984–1985	44	11		
Germany	Reinhard Stumpf	Defender	1992–1994	69	2		
Germany	Torsten Gütschow	Forward	1992–1993	19	12		
Germany	Falko Götz	Forward	1992–1994	80	22		
Germany	Koray Günter	Defender	2014–2018	50	0		
Germany	Lukas Podolski	Forward	2015–2017	75	34		
Germany	**Eyüp Aydın**	Midfielder	2023–	16	1		
Germany	Kerem Demirbay	Midfielder	2023–2025	76	7		
Germany	Derrick Köhn	Defender	2024–2025	19	1		
Germany	**Leroy Sané**	Midfielder	2025–	59	7		
Germany	**İlkay Gündoğan**	Midfielder	2025–	44	2		
Ghana	Ahmed Barusso	Midfielder	2007–2008	3	1		
Greece	Kostas Mitroglou	Forward	2019	9	2		
Guinea-Bissau	**Renato Nhaga**	Midfielder	2026–	11	2		
Hungary	**Roland Sallai**	Midfielder	2024–	94	8		
Indonesia	Javalı Abdülmuttalip	Defender	1906–1907	2	0		
Israel	Haim Revivo	Forward	2002–2003	14	3		
Italy	Morgan De Sanctis	Goalkeeper	2008–2009	39	0		
Italy	Nicolò Zaniolo	Midfielder	2023–2026	16	5		
Ivory Coast	Abdul Kader Keïta	Midfielder	2009–2010	38	10		
Ivory Coast	Emmanuel Eboué	Defender	2011–2015	101	5		
Ivory Coast	Didier Drogba	Forward	2013–2014	53	20		
Ivory Coast	Jean Michaël Seri	Midfielder	2019–2020	37	2		
Ivory Coast	Wilfried Zaha	Midfielder	2023–2026	43	10		
Ivory Coast	Serge Aurier	Defender	2024	4	0		
Ivory Coast	**Wilfried Singo**	Defender	2025–	36	2		
Japan	Junichi Inamoto	Midfielder	2006–2007	34	1		
Japan	Yuto Nagatomo	Defender	2018–2020	65	3		
Kosovo	Milot Rashica	Midfielder	2022–2023	30	6		
Lithuania	Gintaras Staučė	Goalkeeper	1994–1995	39	0		
Mexico	Sergio Almaguer	Defender	2002	8	0		
Mexico	Giovani dos Santos	Forward	2010	18	0		
Montenegro	Milija Bakić	Defender	1906–1910	6	0		
Morocco	Nordin Amrabat	Midfielder	2012–2015	56	3		
Morocco	Younès Belhanda	Midfielder	2017–2021	131	22		
Morocco	Hakim Ziyech	Midfielder	2023–2025	34	8		
Netherlands	Ulrich van Gobbel	Defender	1995–1997	37	2		
Netherlands	Frank de Boer	Defender	2003–2004	23	1		
Netherlands	Wesley Sneijder	Midfielder	2013–2017	175	46		
Netherlands	Nigel de Jong	Midfielder	2016–2018	24	1		
Netherlands	Ryan Babel	Midfielder	2019–2022	100	17		
Netherlands	Patrick van Aanholt	Defender	2021–2024	62	3		
Netherlands	Noa Lang	Midfielder	2026	19	2		
Nigeria	Dominic Iorfa	Forward	1991–1992	9	0		
Nigeria	Henry Onyekuru	Midfielder	2018–2019; 2020; 2021	71	22		
Nigeria	Oghenekaro Etebo	Midfielder	2020–2021	29	0		
Nigeria	Jesse Sekidika	Midfielder	2020–2022	19	1		
Nigeria	**Victor Osimhen**	Forward	2024–	85	69		
North Macedonia	Goran Pandev	Forward	2014–2015	17	7		
Norway	Martin Linnes	Defender	2016–2021	146	5		
Norway	Omar Elabdellaoui	Defender	2020–2022	20	0		
Norway	Fredrik Midtsjø	Midfielder	2022–2023	28	2		
Poland	Roman Kosecki	Forward	1990–1992	51	26		
Poland	**Przemysław Frankowski**	Midfielder	2025–	15	0		
Portugal	Abel Xavier	Defender	2003	12	0		
Portugal	Fernando Meira	Defender	2008–2009	36	0		
Portugal	Bruma	Midfielder	2013–2017	85	15		
Portugal	Josué Pesqueira	Midfielder	2016–2017	33	4		
Portugal	Gedson Fernandes	Midfielder	2021	18	1		
Portugal	Sérgio Oliveira	Midfielder	2022–2024	58	6		
Portugal	**Rafael Leão**	Midfielder	2026–	11	2		
Romania	Iosif Rotariu	Forward	1990–1992	39	5		
Romania	Iulian Filipescu	Defender	1995–1999	83	1		
Romania	Adrian Ilie	Forward	1996–1998	39	20		
Romania	Gheorghe Hagi	Midfielder	1996–2001	196	73		
Romania	Gheorghe Popescu	Defender	1997–2001	181	8		
Romania	Ion Ionuț Luțu	Midfielder	1998	5	0		
Romania	Radu Niculescu	Forward	2002	13	4		
Romania	Gabriel Tamaș	Defender	2003–2004	13	0		
Romania	Florin Bratu	Forward	2003–2004	27	7		
Romania	Ovidiu Petre	Midfielder	2003–2005	37	1		
Romania	Bogdan Stancu	Forward	2010–2011	16	3		
Romania	Iasmin Latovlevici	Defender	2017–2018	15	0		
Romania	Florin Andone	Forward	2019–2020	12	2		
Romania	Olimpiu Moruțan	Midfielder	2021–2023	36	3		
Romania	Alexandru Cicâldău	Midfielder	2021–2024	41	5		
Russia	**Aleksey Batrakov**	Midfielder	2026–	14	6		
Senegal	Mohamed Sarr	Defender	2002–2003	11	2		
Senegal	Badou Ndiaye	Midfielder	2017–2018; 2018–2019	50	4		
Senegal	Mbaye Diagne	Midfielder	2019–2022	62	26		
Senegal	**Ismail Jakobs**	Defender	2024–	76	0		
Serbia	Saša Ilić	Midfielder	2005–2007	76	25		
Spain	Albert Riera	Midfielder	2011–2014	80	4		
Spain	José Rodríguez	Midfielder	2015–2016	23	0		
Spain	Iñaki Peña	Goalkeeper	2022	8	0		
Spain	Juan Mata	Midfielder	2022–2023	18	3		
Spain	Angeliño	Defender	2023–2024	19	1		
Spain	Álvaro Morata	Forward	2025	16	7		
Suriname	Ryan Donk	Midfielder	2016–2021	155	8		
Sweden	Roger Ljung	Forward	1993–1994	20	2		
Sweden	Tobias Linderoth	Midfielder	2007–2010	22	1		
Sweden	Johan Elmander	Forward	2011–2013	61	17		
Sweden	Jimmy Durmaz	Midfielder	2019–2021	17	0		
Switzerland	Kubilay Türkyılmaz	Midfielder	1993–1996	68	25		
Switzerland	Adrian Knup	Forward	1996	14	2		
Switzerland	Hakan Yakin	Midfielder	2004–2005	2	0		
Switzerland	Blerim Džemaili	Midfielder	2014–2015	20	1		
Switzerland	Eren Derdiyok	Forward	2016–2019	84	26		
Switzerland	Haris Seferovic	Forward	2022–2023	13	2		
United Kingdom	Rowland Rees	Forward	1909–1911	5	0		
United Kingdom	Highton	Forward	1909–1911	3	0		
United States	Brad Friedel	Goalkeeper	1995–1997	40	0		
United States	DeAndre Yedlin	Defender	2021–2022	36	1		
Uruguay	Andrés Fleurquin	Midfielder	2001–2002	29	3		
Uruguay	Fernando Muslera	Goalkeeper	2011–2025	549	2		
Uruguay	Marcelo Saracchi	Defender	2020–2021	44	2		
Uruguay	**Lucas Torreira**	Midfielder	2022–	190	12		
Wales	Dean Saunders	Forward	1995–1996	32	21		
Yugoslavia	Vladimir Nikolovski	Forward	1966–1968	5	0		
Yugoslavia	Tatomir Radunović	Goalkeeper	1967–1968	7	0		
Yugoslavia	Ljubomir Milic	Midfielder	1971–1972	2	0		
Yugoslavia	Bosko Kajganic	Goalkeeper	1977–1978	6	0		
Yugoslavia	Lasklo Lerinc	Forward	1978–1979	2	0		
Yugoslavia	Resad Kunovac	Forward	1978–1979	2	0		
Yugoslavia	Jusuf Hatunic	Defender	1978–1979	6	0		
Yugoslavia	Ešref Jašarević	Midfielder	1979	27	9		
Yugoslavia	Tarik Hodžić	Forward	1981–1984	93	40		
Yugoslavia	Mirsad Sejdić	Forward	1981–1984	71	28		
Yugoslavia	Zoran Simović	Goalkeeper	1984–1990	251	1		
Yugoslavia	Dževad Prekazi	Midfielder	1985–1992	247	49		
Yugoslavia	Mersad Kovačević	Forward	1986–1989	114	38		
Yugoslavia	Stevica Kuzmanovski	Defender	1994	10	0		
Zimbabwe	Norman Mapeza	Defender	1994–1995	42	2		

== Photo gallery ==
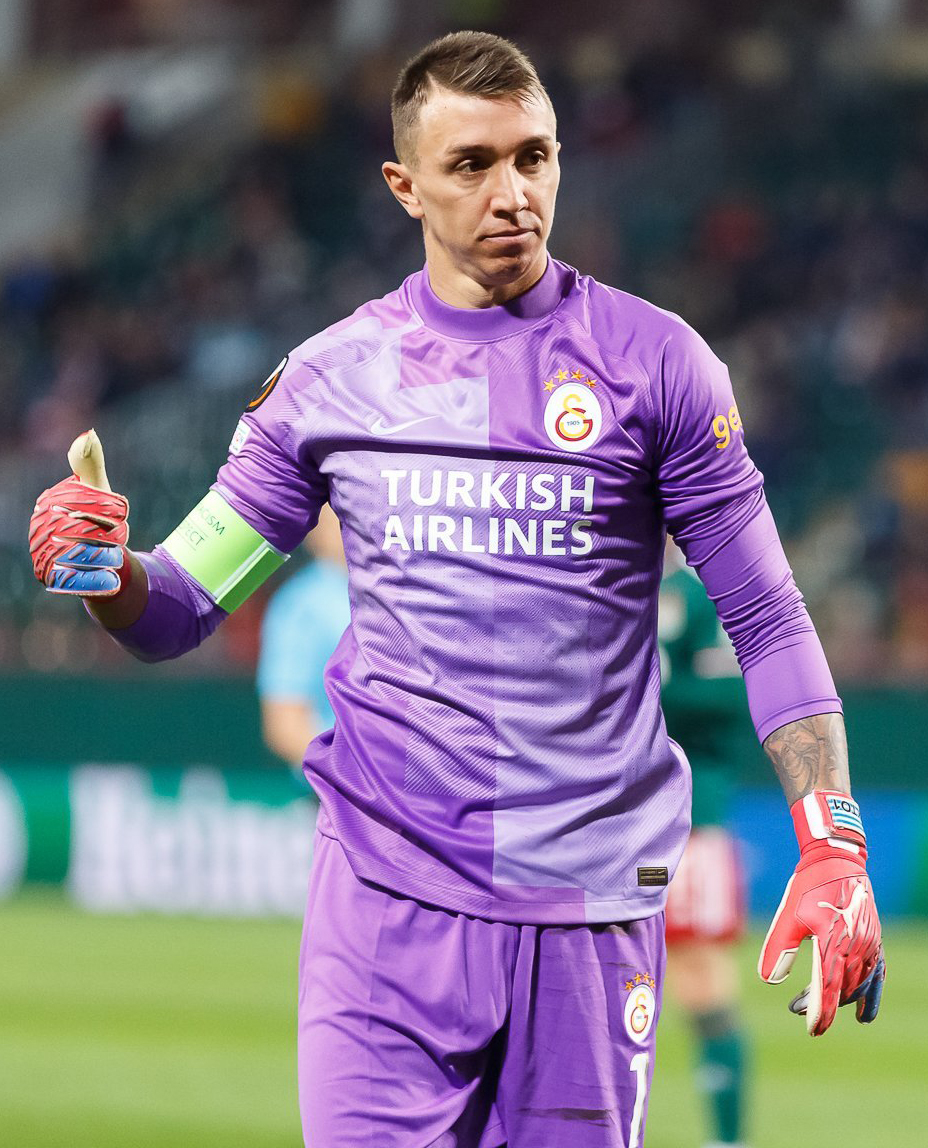
Fernando Muslera
(2011–2025)

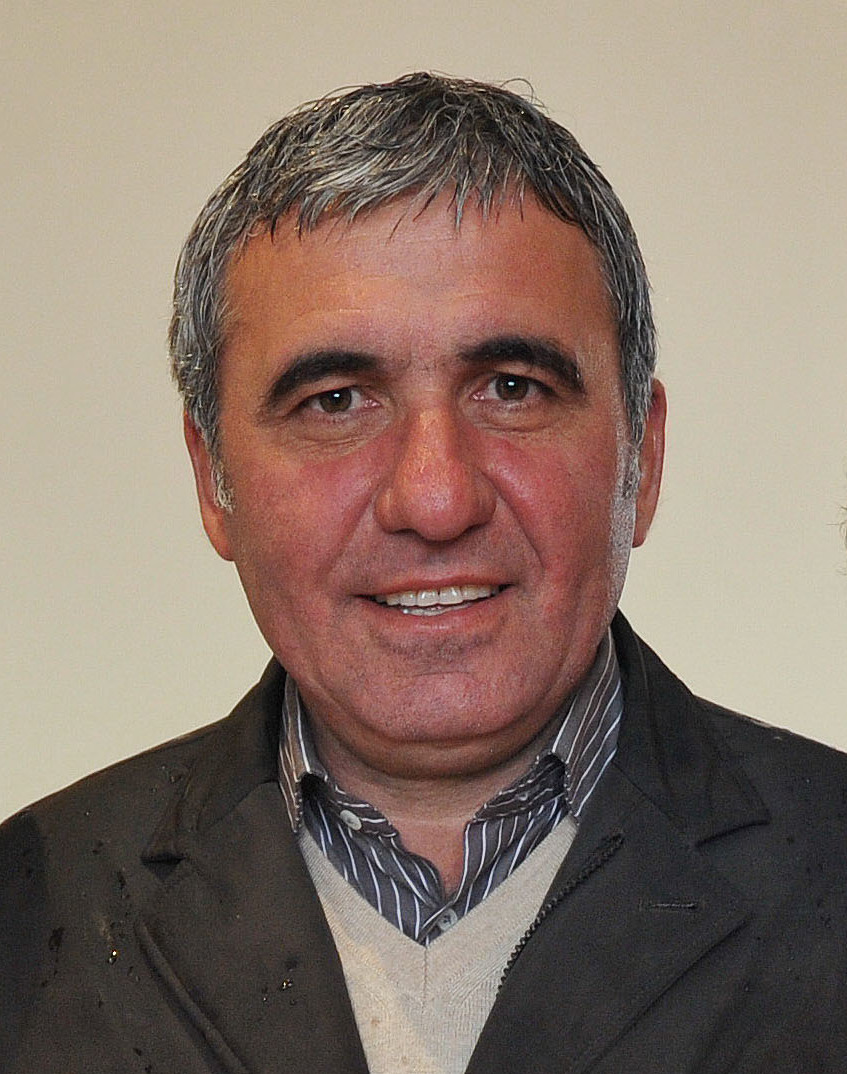
Gheorghe Hagi
(1996–2001)

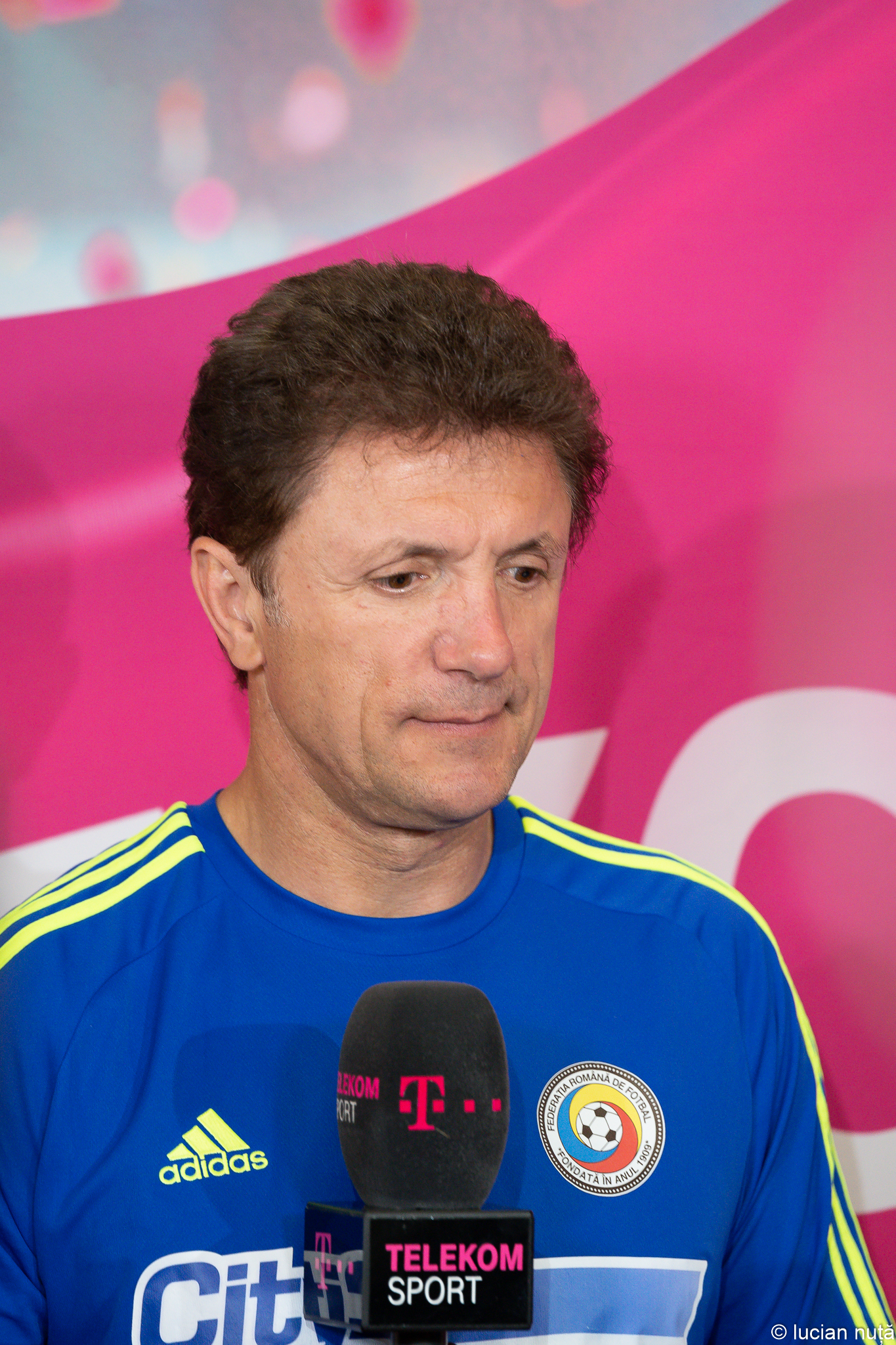
Gheorghe Popescu
(1997–2001)

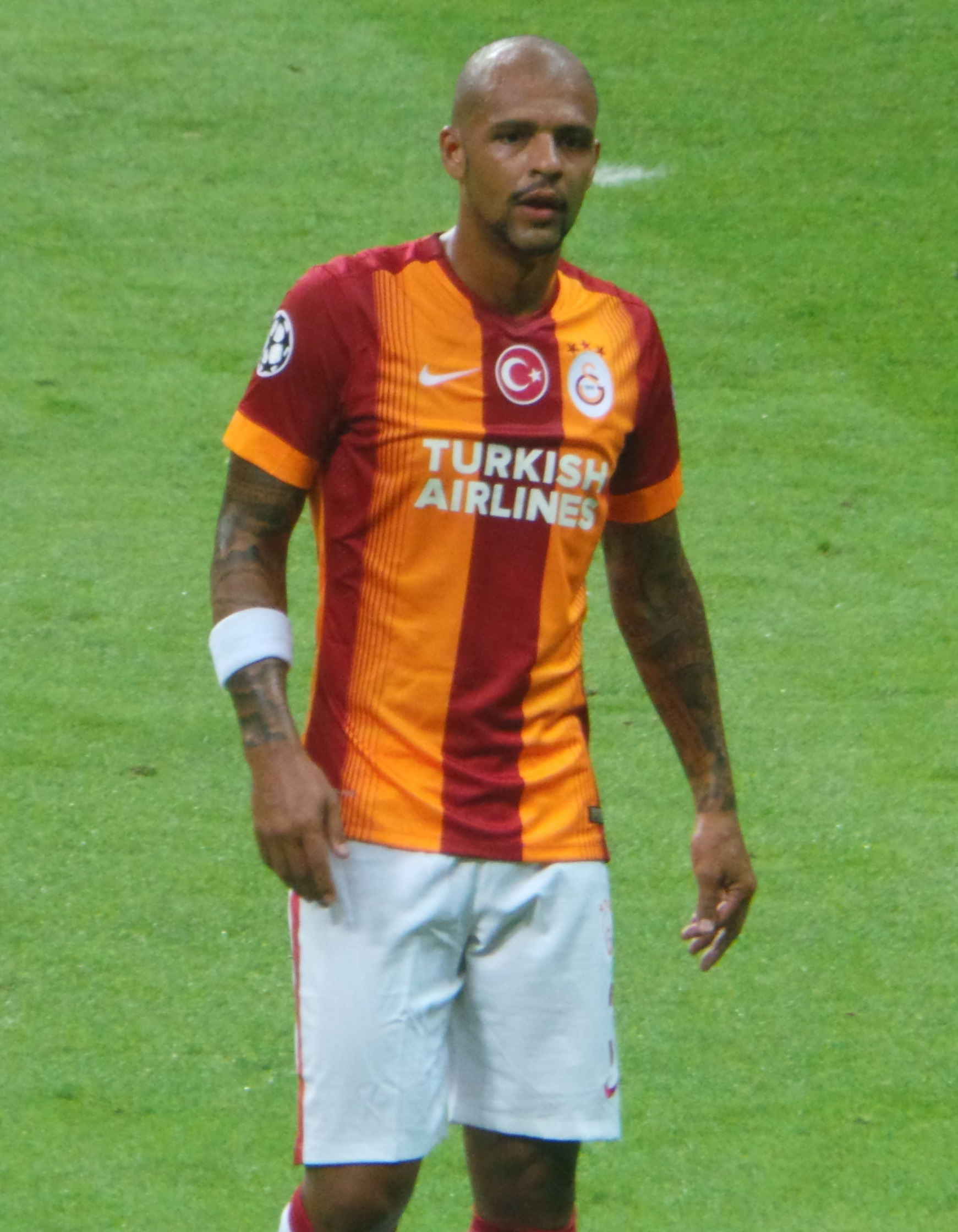
Felipe Melo
(2011–2015)

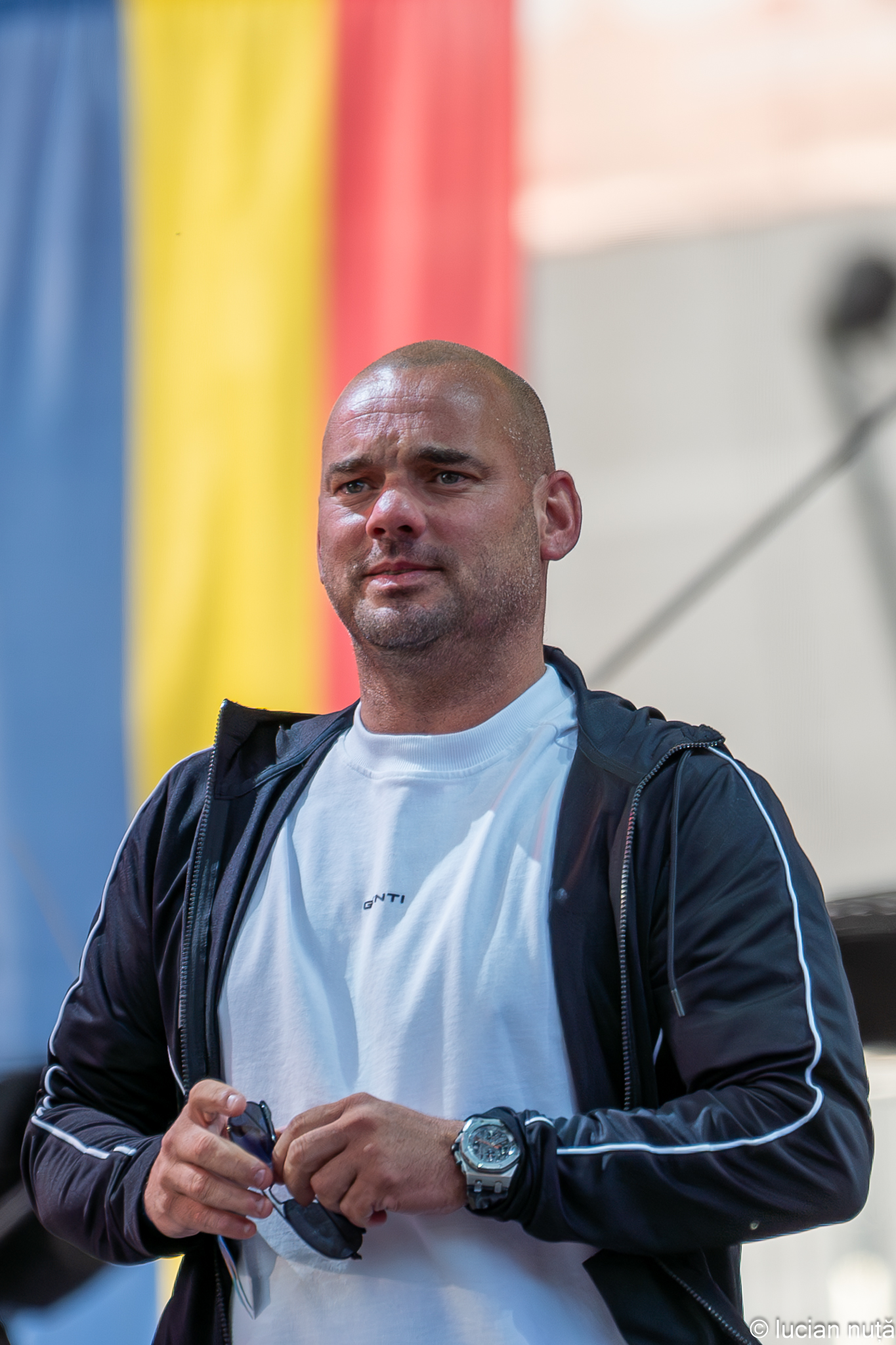
Wesley Sneijder
(2013–2017)

== See also ==
- List of Galatasaray S.K. footballers
- List of Galatasaray S.K. footballers (25–99 appearances)
- List of Galatasaray S.K. footballers (1–24 appearances)
