= Sabahattin =

Sabahattin is a Turkish given name for males. Variant forms of the name such as Sabahudin are also found in the former Ottoman Empire. Notable people with the name include:

- Prens Sabahaddin (1879–1948), Ottoman sociologist
- Sabahudin Agić (born 1969), Bosnian footballer
- Sabahattin Ali (1907–1948), Turkish novelist, short-story writer, poet, and journalist
- Sabahudin Bašović, Bosnian basketball player and coach
- Sabahudin Bilalović (1960–2003), Bosnian basketball player
- Sabahudin Bujak (born 1959), Bosnian-Herzegovinian football player
- Sabahattin Burcu (born 1951), Turkish boxer
- Sabahattin Cevheri (born 1950), Turkish politician
- Sabahattin Çakmakoğlu (1930–2024), Turkish bureaucrat and politician
- Sabahudin Delalić (born 1972), Bosnian sitting volleyball player
- Sabahattin Eyüboğlu (1908–1973), Turkish writer and essayist
- Sabahattin Hamamcıoğlu (born 1966), Turkish alpine skier
- Sabahattin Kalender (1919–2012), Turkish composer
- Sabahudin Kovačevič (born 1986), Slovenian ice hockey player
- Sabahudin Kurt (1935–2018), Bosnian singer
- Sabahattin Kuruoğlu (1937–1995), Turkish footballer
- Sabahattin Oğlago (born 1984), Turkish cross-country skier
- Sabahattin Özbek (1915–2001), Turkish minister
- Sebahattin Öztürk (born 1962), Turkish politician
- Sebahattin Öztürk (born 1969), Turkish wrestler
- Sabahudin Topalbećirević (born 1964), Bosnian sports commentator
- Sabahattin Usta (born 1990), Turkish footballer
- Sabahudin Vugdalić (born 1953), Bosnian sports journalist and football player
