= Turhan =

Turhan is a Turkish masculine given name. Notable persons with the name or surname include:

== Given name ==
- Turhan Baytop (1920–2002), Turkish botanist
- Turahan Bey (died 1456), Ottoman military commander and governor
- Turhan Bey (1922–2012), Turkish-American actor
- Turhan Erdoğan (1938–2019), Turkish academic
- Turhan Feyzioğlu (1922–1988), Turkish academic and politician
- Turhan Göker (1930–2022), Turkish track and field athlete
- Turhan Nejat Veziroğlu (born 1924), Turkish-American academic
- Turhan Përmeti (c. 1840–1927), Albanian politician and statesman
- Turhan Selçuk (1922–2010), Turkish cartoonist
- Turhan Sultan (c. 1627 –1683), Valide sultan of the Ottoman Empire and the final woman of the Sultanate of Women
- Turhan Taşan (born 1948), Turkish musician
- Turhan Tayan (born 1943), Turkish lawyer and politician
- Turhan Tezol (1932–2014), Turkish basketball player
- Turhan Yıldız (born 1940), Turkish footballer
- Turhan Yılmaz (born 1956), Turkish chess player

== Surname ==
- Elif Nur Turhan (born 1995), Turkish boxer
- Evren Nuri Turhan (born 1974), Turkish footballer
- İbrahim Turhan (born 1968), Turkish economist and politician
- Mehmet Cahit Turhan (born 1960), Turkish engineer and politician
- Necdet Turhan (born 1957), Turkish visually impaired mountain climber and long distance runner
- Olcay Turhan (born 1988), German footballer
- Sinan Turhan (born 1956), Turkish footballer
- Tuğra Turhan (born 2007), Turkish footballer

== Fictional characters ==
- Turhan, a character in Babylon 5
