= Necmi =

Necmi ([nedʒmi]) may refer to:

== Given name ==
- Necmi Perekli (born 1948), Turkish footballer
- Necmi Sönmez (born 1968), Turkish-German curator, art critic and writer

== Surname ==
- Ismail Necmi, Turkish independent photographer and filmmaker
