= Sabahudin Topalbećirević =

Bosnian journalist and sportscaster (born 1964)

- Born: 18 June 1964 (age 61); Sarajevo, SR Bosnia and Herzegovina, Yugoslavia
- Occupation: Sportscaster
- Years active: 1992–present
- Employer(s): BHT1, Federalna TV, Face TV, Nova BH

Sabahudin Topalbećirević (born 18 June 1964), also known as "Baho", is a Bosnian journalist and sportscaster who currently works for Nova BH. He is one of the most popular sportscasters in Bosnia and Herzegovina.

Topalbećirević has mostly commented football matches throughout his career, including other world known sports. In his long commentating career, he has won many awards for his many broadcasts of many sports matches and events.

== Career ==
Topalbećirević started his career as a sport journalist at the end of 1992 on Bosnia and Herzegovina national television. Very quickly he dragged attention of audience with his comments that were recognizable, emotional and based on knowledge.

He reported from the Olympic Games in Sydney and Beijing, 4 world and European championships in football, hundreds of broadcasts of Champions League, where of 51 games live. Topalbećirević attended 19 finals of the Champions League, 9 of which he broadcast for Public broadcaster services of Bosnia and Herzegovina. By this he is the absolute record holder in the ex-Yugoslavia.

He followed and reported from 5 European championships in basketball and live broadcast dozens of basketball, football and handball games of Bosnia and Herzegovina division and gained title of best commentator of Bosnia and Herzegovina.

Topalbećirević's live broadcasts of the Premier League of Bosnia and Herzegovina games, eternal derbies of FK Sarajevo and FK Željezničar, finale of Champions league between Bayern and Manchester United in 1999 and Liverpool and Milan in 2005 long ago entered annals of commentator work. “What a hand this man has” is an anthology sentence after the basketball game of Bosnia and Herzegovina and Croatia in 1997.

He commentated the title winning Youth European Championship final between Bosnia and Herzegovina and Lithuania in 2015, Amel Tuka's bronze medal at the World Championships in Beijing. In his career in total, Topalbećirević broadcast 44 final football and basketball games from European and world championships, Champions League finales, UEFA Cup, Cup Winners Cup in basketball, European championships and Olympic games. He was also the editor of the sports program on Live broadcast service and on Federalna televizija of Bosnia and Herzegovina from December 2006 to August 2008. In the period from August 2010 to June 2012, he worked as an executive editor of sports program on TV1.

Topalbećirević is also an author of several sport documentaries about great sport names from the ex-Yugoslavia. Back in 1998 in production of TV BiH he signed his first documentary “Blue story”, on the life of Ivica Osim, one of the best football managers from those areas.

Additionally, he is an author of the reportage on Elvir Baljić from 1999 titled “Prince Baljić”, when he signed a contract with Real Madrid and became the most expensive paid player in the world, as well as a story about Sergej Barbarez, Mirza Delibašić and Elvir Bolić.

In 2014, in production of Al Jazeera Balkans, he presented the movie “Our Brasil story”, speaking about creating the Bosnian Premier League in the most difficult times until qualifying to the 2014 FIFA World Cup in Brasil. Topalbećirević created the show “Top goal” which was for years the most popular sport show on Bosnian television.

In 2008, after the Olympic games in Beijing, he stopped working as a sports commentator. After a 2-year break he returned to TV.

Topalbećirević was the organizer and director of the first sports symposium “SIMPOSAR” that took place for the first time in Sarajevo in 2012 on the topic “Sport successes in the function of the country promotion”. Symposium gathered true sport legends of the region such as Mirko Novosel, Ivica Osim, Faruk Hadžibegić, Duško Vujošević, Aleksandar Petrović, Abas Arslanagić, sportsman who won close to 80 medals in European, world championships and Olympic games.

In the meantime SIMPOSAR brought to Sarajevo sports stars: Don Showalter, Igor Štimac, Joško Vlašić, Amel Tuka, Ćiro Blažević, Davor Šuker, Dragan Džajić, Božo Maljković, Dr. Nebojša Popović, Jean Tigana, Neven Spahija, Predrag Pašić, Mehmed Baždarević, Zlatan Nalić, Željko Pavličević, Željko Jerkov, Zdravko Reić, Božo Sušec, Robert Jarni, Ivica Tucak, Tadija Kačar, Stanko Poklepović, Josip Pandža, Rato Tvrdić, Gianni Ghedini. Two movies had been screened “Our Brasil story” from 2014 and “We will be the world champions” from 2015, author Darko Bajić.

In 1997, Topalbećirević was chosen for the best sports journalist in Bosnia and Herzegovina and in 2007 he won the special award for the affirmation of sports in Bosnia and Herzegovina. As a director of SIMPOSAR he participated in the „International conference on physical education and sports science” in Jaipur in 2017, India, as a key note speaker on the topic “Sport journalism”. In the meantime in January 2014, Topalbećirević launched the web portal brzevijesti.ba.

Since October 2018, he has been working for Nova BH.

== Personal life ==
=== Life and family ===
Topalbećirević graduated sport management in Sarajevo. He is married and is a father of two children. His son, Emir, is a professional basketball player who played for the Slovenian basketball team KK Škofja Loka during the 2022-23 season.

=== Health issues ===
On 28 August 2019, he suffered two kidney attacks in one day, one of them while reporting a 2019–20 UEFA Champions League play-off round match between Ajax and APOEL, which he reported for only one half, before deciding to stop calling the match and go to the hospital. He was released to treat himself at home the next day with proper therapy.
