= Croatia national under-23 football team =

National association football team

Croatia U23
- Nickname: Mladi Vatreni (The Young Blazers)
- Association: Croatian Football Federation (HNS)
- Confederation: UEFA (Europe)
- Head coach: Ognjen Vukojević
- Captain: Tonio Teklić
- Most caps: Željko Pavlović (5) Dražen Madunović (5) Mario Stanić (5) Josip Gašpar (5) Danijel Štefulj (5)
- Top scorer: Igor Cvitanović (2)
- FIFA code: CRO
First colours	Second colours

First international
- Croatia 1–1 Slovenia (Varaždin, Croatia; 17 March 1993)

Biggest win
- Qatar A 0–3 Croatia (Wiener Neustadt, Austria; 20 September 2022)

Biggest defeat
- Croatia 0–2 Tunisia (Alès, France; 17 June 1993)
- Website: hns-cff.hr

The Croatia national under-23 football team represents Croatia in international men's football matches for players aged 23 or under. It is governed by the Croatian Football Federation, the governing body for football in Croatia. It is a member of UEFA in Europe and FIFA in global competitions. The team's colours reference two national symbols: the Croatian checkerboard and the country's tricolour. Although the team never competed at the Olympics, the team is sometimes referred to as the Croatia Olympic football team (Croatian: Hrvatska olimpijska nogometna reprezentacija).

The team was formed for the 1993 Mediterranean Games held in France. Before the tournament, Croatia played two preparational friendlies against Slovenia, both ending in a 1–1 draw. These were the first matches ever played by the Croatian team. At the tournament itself, Croatia finished last in its four-team group, losing two games and drawing one. In 1996, the team played a friendly against Brazil as Brazil's preparation match for the upcoming 1996 Olympics, drawing 1–1. During the 1997 Mediterranean Games held in Italy, the team again finished last in its three-team group, losing both matches. In 1998, it won a friendly against Romania with a 0–1 score and in 2013 it lost a friendly against the Netherlands. The team didn't play any matches from 2013 until 2022 when it met the Qatari senior team as part of their pre-2022 FIFA World Cup preparation in a friendly in Austria, winning 3–0.

Since Croatia U21 never managed to secure Croatia's participation at the Olympics through the UEFA EURO U21 Championship, which serves as a qualifying system, Croatia U23 has never participated in the Olympics.

== History ==
Croatia's national under-23 football team was formed for the occasion of the 1993 Mediterranean Games, held in June 1993 in France. The team was led by Vlatko Marković. Its first matches, the two friendlies against Slovenia, were played as a preparation for the Mediterranean Games. The two teams first met on 17 March 1993 in Zaprešić, Croatia, and the second time on 12 May 1993 in Maribor, Slovenia, with both matches ending in a 1–1 draw. At the tournament itself, Croatia was in the group with Tunisia, Turkey, and France. It played its first match against Tunisia, losing 0–2. Its second match against Turkey also ended in defeat, with a score of 2–3. A 3–3 draw against France was their last match in the tournament. Croatia finished last among the ten teams, while Turkey won the tournament. The 1993 Mediterranean Games were at the same time the first Croatian encounter with international competitive football after its independence. The coach Marković was disappointed with the performance, blaming the "celebrities" within the team, commenting that "the first encounter with the world football shows us how low we have fallen, we're at the tail of all modern football events".

Croatia's U23 team went on to play against Brazil's U23 team in a friendly, which ended in a 1–1 draw. Croatia was led by Martin Novoselac. At the time Brazil held the champions title of the 1994 FIFA World Cup and was preparing for the 1996 Olympics in the United States.

Under the leadership of Ivo Šušak, the Croatian U23 team competed at the 1997 Mediterranean Games, being in the group with Bosnia and Herzegovina and Spain. It lost both matches, with scores 0–1 against Bosnia and Herzegovina and 1–2 against Spain, finishing last in its group. Italy won the tournament, while Croatia finished 10th among 13 teams. The football tournament at the next Mediterranean Games was limited to players aged 21 or younger, with Croatia not participating in future Mediterranean football tournaments.

In 1998, in Bucharest, Croatia played a friendly against Romania, which at the time had one of the best young football teams. Croatia won the match with a 0–1 score. Fifteen years later, in 2013, Croatia played against the Netherlands in Pula, with Croatia losing 2–3.

The team was formed again in September 2022 to replace Bolivia senior team for a friendly match against Qatar senior team, after Bolivia cancelled the match. The Croatian team was led by Robert Jarni who also led the Croatia U17 team. The match was played on 20 September 2022 in Wiener Neustadt in Austria as Qatar's preparation for the 2022 FIFA World Cup which they hosted. Croatia won 0–3. Qatar senior team played a return match against Croatia on 8 June 2023, in Vorau, with Croatia winning 0–1. The Croatian team was led by Ognjen Vukojević.

== Results ==
17 March 1993 Friendly	Croatia	1–1	Slovenia	Varaždin, Croatia
15:15	Cvitanović 6'	Report	Marušič 67'	Stadium: Stadion Varteks; Attendance: 5,000; Referee: Lajos Hartmann (Hungary)

12 May 1993 Friendly	Slovenia	1–1	Croatia	Maribor, Slovenia
16:30	Pavlin 25'	Report	Stanić 12'; Madunović (yellow card) 70'; Pinturić (yellow card) 78'; Štefulj (yellow card) 82'	Stadium: Ljudski vrt Attendance: 2,000; Referee: Ladislav Gádoši (Slovakia)

17 June 1993 1993 Mediterranean Games Gr B	Croatia	0–2	Tunisia	Alès, France
20:00	Jozinović (yellow card) 38'; Težački (red card) 78'	Report	Baya 57'; Selimi 86'	Stadium: Stade Pierre Pibarot; Attendance: 2,000; Referee: Giorgos Bikas (Greece)

19 June 1993 1993 Mediterranean Games Gr B	Croatia	2–3	Turkey	Sète, France
	Gašpar 56'; Okuroğlu 81' (o.g.)	Report	Erdem 25'; Yalçın 40', 62'	Stadium: Stade Louis-Michel; Attendance: 2,000; Referee: Merzak Nems (Algeria)

21 June 1993 1993 Mediterranean Games Gr B	France	3–3	Croatia	Alès, France
	Nouma 11', 64' (pen.); Zidane 79'	Report	Vlaović 33'; Vučević 49'; Cvitanović 52'	Stadium: Stade Pierre Pibarot; Attendance: 7,000; Referee: Salem Prolić (Bosnia and Herzegovina)

22 May 1996 Friendly	Brazil	1–1	Croatia	Manaus, Brazil
17:00	Sávio 48'	Report	Rapaić 36'	Stadium: Vivaldão; Attendance: 43,825

17 June 1997 1997 Mediterranean Games Gr D	Croatia	0–1	Bosnia and Herzegovina	Brindisi, Italy
		Report	Topić 40'	Stadium: Stadio Franco Fanuzzi; Referee: Graziano Cesari (Italy)

21 June 1997 1997 Mediterranean Games Gr D	Croatia	1–2	Spain	Lecce, Italy
	Bazina 19'; Jurić (red card) 29'; Žilić (yellow card); Kosić (yellow card)	Report	Ballesteros 7', 57'; Guréndez (yellow card)	Stadium: Stadio Via del Mare; Attendance: 150; Referee: Pascal Garibian (France)

17 March 1998 Friendly	Romania	0–1	Croatia	Bucharest, Romania
		Report	Vugrinec	Stadium: Stadionul Național

5 February 2013 Friendly	Croatia	2–3	Netherlands	Pula, Croatia
15:00	Kramarić 7'; Boras 90+1'	Report	de Jong 50'; Locadia 66'; Vilhena 80'	Stadium: Stadion Veruda; Referee: Darko Čeferin (Slovenia); Assistant referees: Andrej Kokolj (Slovenia); Jure Prapotnik (Slovenia); Fourth official: Marin Vidulin (Croatia)

20 September 2022 Friendly	Qatar A	0–3	Croatia	Wiener Neustadt, Austria
16:00 UTC		Report	Teklić 14' (pen.); Mitrović 16'; Kulenović 87'	Stadium: Stadion Wiener Neustadt; Referee: Stevan Radenkovic (Austria)

8 June 2023 Friendly	Qatar A	0–1	Croatia	Vorau, Austria
18:00 UTC	Shehata (yellow card) 34'	Report	Goda (yellow card) 36'; Bušnja (yellow card) 63'; Matanović 79'	Stadium: Ukraft Arena; Referee: Alexander Harkam (Austria)

== Coaching staff ==
=== Current coaching staff ===
Position	Name
Head coach	(Croatia) Ognjen Vukojević

== Players ==
=== Last squad ===
The following players were named in the squad for a friendly against Qatar A on 8 June 2023.

No.	Pos.	Player	Date of birth (age)	Caps	Goals	Club
1	GK	Lovro Majkić	8 October 1999 (age 27)	1	0	(Hellenic Football Federation) Aris
12	GK	Dinko Horkaš	10 March 1999 (age 27)	1	0	(Royal Spanish Football Federation) Las Palmas
2	DF	Luka Hujber	16 June 1999 (age 27)	1	0	(Football Association of Bosnia and Herzegovina) Sarajevo
3	DF	Bruno Goda	17 April 1998 (age 28)	1	0	(Croatian Football Federation) Dinamo Zagreb
4	DF	Branimir Kalaica	1 June 1998 (age 28)	1	0	(Kazakhstan Football Federation) Astana
5	DF	Vinko Soldo	15 February 1998 (age 28)	1	0	(Turkish Football Federation) Pendikspor
13	DF	Matej Maglica	25 September 1998 (age 28)	1	0	(German Football Association) Darmstadt 98
14	DF	Ivan Smolčić	17 August 2000 (age 26)	1	0	(Italian Football Federation) Como
15	DF	Jozo Stanić	6 April 1999 (age 27)	2	0	(Swiss Football Association) St. Gallen
6	MF	Mario Ćurić	28 September 1998 (age 28)	1	0	(Russian Football Union) Torpedo Moscow
8	MF	Neven Đurasek	15 August 1998 (age 28)	1	0	(Football Association of Bosnia and Herzegovina) Zrinjski
10	MF	Tonio Teklić	9 September 1999 (age 27)	2	1	(Polish Football Association) Widzew Łódź
16	MF	Mario Čuić	22 April 2001 (age 25)	1	0	(Football Association of Bosnia and Herzegovina) Posušje
18	MF	Leon Belcar	4 January 2002 (age 24)	1	0	(Croatian Football Federation) Lokomotiva Zagreb
7	FW	Kristian Fućak	14 November 1998 (age 27)	1	0	(Polish Football Association) Miedź
9	FW	Sandro Kulenović	4 December 1999 (age 26)	2	1	(Italian Football Federation) Torino
11	FW	Mario Ćuže	24 April 1999 (age 27)	1	0	(Football Association of Bosnia and Herzegovina) Zrinjski
17	FW	Denis Bušnja	14 April 2000 (age 26)	1	0	(Football Association of Bosnia and Herzegovina) Posušje
19	FW	Igor Matanović	31 March 2003 (age 23)	1	1	(German Football Association) SC Freiburg

== Competitive record ==
Champions
Runners-up
Third place
Fourth place
Tournament played fully or partially on home soil

=== Olympic Games ===
Summer Olympic Games record										Qualifications record	
Year	Round	Position	GP	W	D*	L	GF	GA	Squad	Qualifications record	
(Greece) 1896	Part of Austria-Hungary										
(France) 1900	Part of Austria-Hungary										
(United States) 1904	Part of Austria-Hungary										
(United Kingdom) 1908	Part of Austria-Hungary										
(Sweden) 1912	Part of Austria-Hungary										
(Belgium) 1920	Part of Yugoslavia										
(France) 1924	Part of Yugoslavia										
(Netherlands) 1928	Part of Yugoslavia										
(Germany) 1936	Part of Yugoslavia										
(United Kingdom) 1948	Part of Yugoslavia										
(Finland) 1952	Part of Yugoslavia										
(Australia) 1956	Part of Yugoslavia										
(Italy) 1960	Part of Yugoslavia										
(Japan) 1964	Part of Yugoslavia										
(Mexico) 1968	Part of Yugoslavia										
(West Germany) 1972	Part of Yugoslavia										
(Canada) 1976	Part of Yugoslavia										
(Soviet Union) 1980	Part of Yugoslavia										
(United States) 1984	Part of Yugoslavia										
(South Korea) 1988	Part of Yugoslavia										
(Spain) 1992	Not a FIFA member										
(United States) 1996	Did not qualify									UEFA European Under-21 Championship	1996
(Australia) 2000	Did not qualify									UEFA European Under-21 Championship	2000
(Greece) 2004	Did not qualify									UEFA European Under-21 Championship	2004
(China) 2008	Did not qualify									UEFA European Under-21 Championship	2008
(United Kingdom) 2012	Did not qualify									UEFA European Under-21 Championship	2012
(Brazil) 2016	Did not qualify									UEFA European Under-21 Championship	2016
(Japan) 2020	Did not qualify									UEFA European Under-21 Championship	2020
(France) 2024	Did not qualify									UEFA European Under-21 Championship	2024
(United States) 2028	To be determined									UEFA European Under-21 Championship	2028
(Australia) 2032	To be determined									UEFA European Under-21 Championship	2032
Total	0/29										

Matches
First match	—
Biggest win	—
Biggest defeat	—

=== Mediterranean Games ===
Since Croatia's independence, Croatia's U23 football team participated in two Mediterranean Games: 1993 and 1997. The next 2001 Mediterranean Games were limited to U21 teams, while the 2005 Mediterranean Games were set for the U23 teams, even though none of the players who participated were older than 21. The 2009 Mediterranean Games were limited to U20 teams, while the 2013 Games pushed the limit to U19 teams. Since 2018, the Mediterranean Games have invited U18, U19 and U21 teams, though, only U18 teams participated ever since. No Croatian team participated in the Mediterranean Games after 1997.

Mediterranean Games record
Year	Round	Position	GP	W	D*	L	GF	GA	Squad
(Egypt) 1951	Part of Yugoslavia								
(Spain) 1955	Part of Yugoslavia								
(Lebanon) 1959	Part of Yugoslavia								
(Italy) 1963	Part of Yugoslavia								
(Tunisia) 1967	Part of Yugoslavia								
(Turkey) 1971	Part of Yugoslavia								
(Algeria) 1975	Part of Yugoslavia								
(Socialist Federal Republic of Yugoslavia) 1979	Part of Yugoslavia								
(Morocco) 1983	Part of Yugoslavia								
(Syria) 1987	Part of Yugoslavia								
(Greece) 1991	Part of Yugoslavia								
(France) 1993	Group stage	10/10	3	0	1	2	5	8	1993
(Italy) 1997	Group stage	10/13	2	0	0	2	1	3	1997
Total	Group stage	2/13	5	0	1	4	6	11	Total

Correct as of 21 June 1997 after the match against Spain.

Matches
First match	Croatia 0–2 Tunisia (Alès, France; 17 June 1993)
Biggest win	—
Biggest defeat	Croatia 0–2 Tunisia (Alès, France; 21 June 1993)

== Statistics ==
=== Managers ===
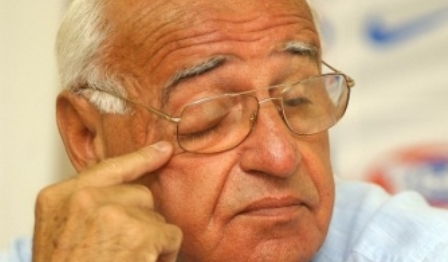
Vlatko Marković was the first coach of Croatia's U23 national team

The following table provides a summary of the complete record of each Croatia manager's results.

Key: Pld–games played, W–games won, D–games drawn; L–games lost, %–win percentage

Manager	Tenure	Pld	W	D	L	Win %	Tournaments
(Croatia) Vlatko Marković	1993	5	0	3	2	0.0	1993 Mediterranean Games – Group stage
(Croatia) Martin Novoselac	1996	1	0	1	0	0.0	—N/a
(Croatia) Ivo Šušak	1997–2013	4	1	0	3	25.0	1997 Mediterranean Games – Group stage
(Croatia) Robert Jarni	2022	1	1	0	0	100.0	—N/a
(Croatia) Ognjen Vukojević	2023	1	1	0	0	100.0	—N/a

Last updated: Qatar A vs Croatia, 8 June 2023.

=== Most capped players ===
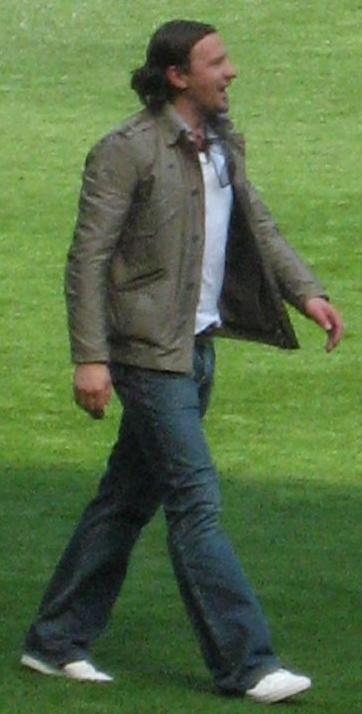
Mario Stanić (pictured), Željko Pavlović, Dražen Madunović, Josip Gašpar, and Danijel Štefulj are the most capped players for Croatia's U23 team, each playing three matches

Rank	Player	Caps	Goals	Career
1	Željko Pavlović	5	0	1993
1	Dražen Madunović	5	0	1993
1	Mario Stanić	5	1	1993
1	Josip Gašpar	5	1	1993
1	Danijel Štefulj	5	0	1993–1996
6	Zoran Ban	4	0	1993
6	Goran Vlaović	4	1	1993
6	Ivica Mornar	4	0	1993
6	Ivan Jurić	4	0	1996–1998
6	Mario Cvitanović	4	0	1996–1998

Last updated: Qatar A vs. Croatia, 8 June 2023

=== Top goalscorers ===
Rank	Player	Goals	Caps	Ratio	Career
1	Igor Cvitanović	2	3	0.67	1993
2	Andrej Kramarić	1	1	1	2013
2	Ivan Boras	1	1	1	2013
2	Josip Mitrović	1	1	1	2022
2	Igor Matanović	1	1	1	2023
2	Milan Rapaić	1	2	0.5	1993–1996
2	Davor Vugrinec	1	2	0.5	1996–1998
2	Mario Bazina	1	2	0.5	1997
2	Tonio Teklić	1	2	0.5	2022–2023
2	Sandro Kulenović	1	2	0.5	2022–2023
2	Goran Vučević	1	3	0.33	1993
2	Goran Vlaović	1	4	0.25	1993
2	Josip Gašpar	1	5	0.2	1993
2	Mario Stanić	1	5	0.2	1993

Last updated: Qatar A vs. Croatia, 8 June 2023

=== Most clean sheets ===
Rank	Player	Clean sheets	Caps	Ratio	Career
1	Nediljko Labrović	1	1	1	2022
1	Karlo Sentić	1	1	1	2022
1	Lovro Majkić	1	1	1	2023
1	Dinko Horkaš	1	1	1	2023
1	Vladimir Vasilj	1	3	0.33	1997–1998

Last updated: Qatar A vs. Croatia, 8 June 2023

== Record per opponent ==
Key

More wins than losses
As many wins as losses
Fewer wins than losses

Correct as of 8 June 2023, after the match against Qatar A.

Opponent	Pld	W	D	L	GF	GA	GD	Win %
Bosnia and Herzegovina	1	0	0	1	0	1	−1	0.00
Brazil	1	0	1	0	1	1	+0	0.00
France	1	0	1	0	3	3	+0	0.00
Netherlands	1	0	0	1	2	3	−1	0.00
Qatar A	2	2	0	0	4	0	+4	100.00
Romania	1	1	0	0	1	0	+1	100.00
Slovenia	2	0	2	0	2	2	+0	0.00
Spain	1	0	0	1	1	2	−1	0.00
Tunisia	1	0	0	1	0	2	−2	0.00
Turkey	1	0	0	1	2	3	−1	0.00
Total: 9 teams played	12	3	4	5	16	17	−1	25.00

== See also ==
- Croatia national football team
- Croatia national football B team
- Croatia national under-21 football team
- Croatia national under-20 football team
- Croatia national under-19 football team
- Croatia national under-18 football team
- Croatia national under-17 football team
- Croatia national under-16 football team
- Croatia national under-15 football team
- Croatia women's national football team
- Croatia women's national under-19 football team
- Croatia women's national under-17 football team
- Croatia women's national under-15 football team
