= Football at the 1993 Mediterranean Games – Men's team squads =

Below are the squads for the Football at the 1993 Mediterranean Games, hosted in Languedoc-Roussillon, France, and took place between 16 and 27 June 1993. Teams were national U-23 sides.

== Group A ==
=== Algeria ===
Head coach: (Algeria) Mustapha Aksouh

No.	Pos.	Player	Date of birth (age)	Caps	Club
	GK	Lyamine Bougherara	1 December 1971 (aged 21)		(Algeria) AS Ain M'lila
	GK	Fayçal Bentalaa	17 May 1972 (aged 21)		(Algeria) CR Belouizdad
	DF	Fayçal Hamdani	13 July 1970 (aged 22)		(Algeria) WA Boufarik
	DF	Ahmed Chedeba	21 October 1971 (aged 21)		(Algeria) CR Belouizdad
	DF	Abdelaziz Benhamlat	22 March 1974 (aged 19)		(Algeria) JS Kabylie
	DF	Messaoud Aït Abderrahmane (c)	6 November 1970 (aged 22)		(Algeria) JS Kabylie
	DF	Rezki Amrouche	17 November 1970 (aged 22)		(Algeria) NA Hussein Dey
	MF	Hakim Amaouche			(Algeria) JS Kabylie
	MF	Laïd Khiat	30 November 1970 (aged 22)		(Algeria) US Chaouia
	MF	Sid Ahmed Zerrouki	30 August 1970 (aged 22)		(Algeria) MC Oran
	MF	Nacer Gaid	9 November 1970 (aged 22)		(Algeria) ASM Oran
	MF	Lakhdar Adjali	18 July 1972 (aged 20)		(Algeria) NA Hussein Dey
	FW	Nacer Zekri	3 August 1971 (aged 21)		(Algeria) MC Alger
	FW	Fawzi Moussouni	8 April 1972 (aged 21)		(Algeria) CR Belouizdad
		Nabil Boursas			(Algeria) USM Ain Beida
		Mekki Merabet	8 April 1972 (aged 21)		(Algeria) USM Bel-Abbès
		Redouane Benmessahel			(Algeria) WA Boufarik

=== Greece ===
Head coach:

No.	Pos.	Player	Date of birth (age)	Caps	Club
	MF	Andreas Lagonikakis	4 June 1972 (aged 21)		(Greece) Panionios
	MF	Vasilios Tsiartas	12 November 1972 (aged 20)		(Greece) AEK Athens

=== Bosnia-Herzegovina ===
Head coach: Mirsad Fazlagić

No.	Pos.	Player	Date of birth (age)	Caps	Club
	GK	Admir Abdulahović			
	DF	Mirza Varešanović	31 May 1972 (aged 21)		(Bosnia and Herzegovina) FK Sarajevo
	DF	Mirsad Hibić	11 October 1973 (aged 19)		(Croatia) Hajduk Split
	DF	Memnun Suljagić	16 February 1966 (aged 27)		(Bosnia and Herzegovina) FK Sarajevo
	DF	Edin Ramčić	1 August 1970 (aged 22)		(Croatia) Uljanik
	DF	Jasenko Sabitović	29 May 1973 (aged 20)		(Croatia) Radnik Velika Gorica
	MF	Senad Repuh	18 November 1972 (aged 20)		(Bosnia and Herzegovina) FK Sarajevo
	MF	Nedžad Fazlagić	30 November 1974 (aged 18)		(Bosnia and Herzegovina) FK Sarajevo
	MF	Rusmir Cviko	2 January 1972 (aged 21)		(Bosnia and Herzegovina) FK Sarajevo
	MF	Sead Kapetanović	21 January 1972 (aged 21)		(Germany) Viktoria Aschaffenburg
	FW	Azrudin Valentić	21 July 1970 (aged 22)		(Bosnia and Herzegovina) FK Sarajevo
	FW	Emir Granov	17 February 1976 (aged 17)		(Bosnia and Herzegovina) FK Sarajevo
	MF	Esmir Džafić	7 October 1967 (aged 25)		(Bosnia and Herzegovina) Bosna Visoko
	FW	Boris Gavran	15 February 1972 (aged 21)		(Bosnia and Herzegovina) Čelik Zenica

== Group B ==
=== Croatia ===
Head coach: (Croatia) Vlatko Marković

No.	Pos.	Player	Date of birth (age)	Caps	Club
	GK	Željko Pavlović	2 March 1971 (aged 22)		Croatia Zagreb
	DF	Darko Butorović	12 August 1970 (aged 22)		(Croatia) Hajduk Split
	DF	Dražen Madunović	17 March 1971 (aged 22)		Croatia Zagreb
	DF	Danijel Štefulj	2 June 1973 (aged 20)		(Croatia) Varteks
	DF	Daniel Šarić	4 August 1970 (aged 22)		(Croatia) Rijeka
	MF	Josip Gašpar	15 March 1973 (aged 20)		Croatia Zagreb
	MF	Darko Jozinović	15 August 1970 (aged 22)		(Croatia) Cibalia
	MF	Joško Jeličić	5 January 1971 (aged 22)		(Croatia) Hajduk Split
	MF	Goran Vučević	18 May 1971 (aged 22)		(Spain) Barcelona
	MF	Robert Težački	22 May 1971 (aged 22)		(Croatia) Varteks
	MF	Dragan Buterin	25 October 1971 (aged 21)		(Croatia) Zadar
	MF	Đovani Roso	17 November 1972 (aged 20)		(Croatia) Zadar
	MF	Damir Krznar	10 July 1972 (aged 20)		(Croatia) Varteks
	FW	Mario Stanić	10 April 1972 (aged 21)		Croatia Zagreb
	FW	Zoran Ban	27 May 1973 (aged 20)		(Croatia) Rijeka
	FW	Goran Vlaović	7 August 1972 (aged 20)		Croatia Zagreb
	FW	Igor Cvitanović	1 November 1970 (aged 22)		Croatia Zagreb
	FW	Ivica Mornar	12 January 1974 (aged 19)		(Croatia) Hajduk Split
	FW	Krunoslav Pinturić	3 September 1971 (aged 21)		(Croatia) Zagreb

=== France ===
Head coach: Marc Bourrier

No.	Pos.	Player	Date of birth (age)	Caps	Club
	GK	Grégory Wimbée	19 August 1971		(France) Olympique Football Club Charleville
	GK	Richard Dutruel	24 December 1972		(France) Paris SG
	GK	Thomas Kokkinis	8 August 1971		(France) FC Metz
	DF	Serge Blanc	22 October 1972		(France) Montpellier
	DF	Bruno Carotti	30 September 1972		(France) Montpellier HSC
	DF	Oumar Dieng	30 December 1972		(France) Lille OSC
	DF	Maxence Flachez	5 August 1972		(France) Olympique Lyonnais
	DF	Fabien Leclercq	19 October 1972		(France) Lille OSC
	DF	Francis Llacer	9 September 1971		(France) Paris SG
	DF	Erwan Manac'h	2 October 1971		(France) SAS Épinal
	DF	Lilian Thuram	1 January 1972		(France) AS Monaco
	MF	Jocelyn Gourvennec	22 March 1972		(France) Stade Rennais
	MF	Reynald Pedros	10 October 1971		(France) Nantes
	MF	Eric Rabesandratana	18 September 1972		(France) AS Nancy
	MF	Zinedine Zidane	23 June 1972		(France) Girondins de Bordeaux
	FW	Pascal Nouma	6 January 1972		(France) Caen
	FW	Nicolas Ouedec	28 October 1971		(France) FC Nantes
	FW	Tony Vairelles	10 April 1973		(France) Nancy

=== Tunisia ===
Head coach:

No.	Pos.	Player	Date of birth (age)	Caps	Club
	MF	Zoubeir Baya	15 May 1971 (aged 22)		(Tunisia) ES Sahel
	FW	Adel Sellimi	16 November 1972 (aged 20)		(Tunisia) Club Africain

=== Turkey ===
Head coach: (Turkey) Fatih Terim

No.	Pos.	Player	Date of birth (age)	Caps	Club
	MF	Feti Okuroğlu	5 August 1971		(Turkey) Bursaspor
	DF	Şenol Yavaş	22 June 1973		(Turkey) Karşıyaka
	DF	Taner Taşkın	27 October 1972		(Turkey) Gençlerbirliği
	GK	Aydın Dağdelen	15 April 1971		(Turkey) Altay
	GK	Hasan Gültang	29 October 1972		(Turkey) Gençlerbirliği
	GK	Nihat Tümkaya	24 March 1972		(Turkey) İskenderunspor
	DF	Rahim Zafer	21 January 1971		(Turkey) Gençlerbirliği
	DF	Emre Aşık	13 December 1973		(Turkey) Fenerbahçe
	DF	Alpay Özalan	29 May 1973		(Turkey) Altay
	DF	Mutlu Topçu	16 November 1970		(Turkey) Beşiktaş
	MF	Sergen Yalçın	5 October 1972		(Turkey) Beşiktaş
	MF	Tugay Kerimoğlu	24 August 1970		(Turkey) Galatasaray
	MF	Ergün Penbe	17 May 1972		(Turkey) Gençlerbirliği
	FW	Arif Erdem	2 January 1972		(Turkey) Galatasaray
	FW	Hakan Şükür	1 September 1971		(Turkey) Galatasaray
	FW	Bülent Uygun	1 August 1971		(Turkey) Kocaelispor
	MF	Abdullah Ercan	8 December 1971		(Turkey) Trabzonspor
	FW	Cafer Aydın	17 November 1971		(Turkey) Kayserispor

== Group C ==
=== Italy ===
Head coach: (Italy) Cesare Maldini

No.	Pos.	Player	Date of birth (age)	Caps	Club
	GK	Francesco Toldo	2 December 1971		(Italy) Ravenna
	GK	Stefano Visi	11 December 1971		(Italy) Sambenedettese
	DF	Francesco Baldini	14 March 1974		(Italy) Lucchese
	DF	Simone Altobelli	20 July 1970		(Italy) Lecce
	DF	Francesco Colonnese	10 August 1971		(Italy) Cremonese
	DF	Daniele Delli Carri	18 September 1971		(Italy) Lucchese
	DF	Gianluca Francesconi	10 September 1971		(Italy) Reggiana
	DF	Salvatore Matrecano	5 October 1970		(Italy) Parma
	DF	Stefano Torrisi	7 May 1971		(Italy) Ravenna
	MF	Massimo Orlando	26 May 1971		(Italy) Fiorentina
	MF	Luigi Di Biagio	3 June 1971		(Italy) Foggia
	MF	Christian Panucci	12 April 1973		(Italy) Genoa
	MF	Eugenio Corini	30 July 1970		(Italy) Sampdoria
	MF	Gianluca Cherubini	28 February 1974		(Italy) Reggiana
	MF	Dario Marcolin	28 October 1971		(Italy) Lazio
	FW	Christian Vieri	12 July 1973		(Italy) Pisa
	FW	Marco Delvecchio	7 April 1973		(Italy) Venezia
	FW	Mauro Bertarelli	15 September 1970		(Italy) Sampdoria
	FW	Massimiliano Cappellini	21 January 1971		(Italy) Como

=== Morocco ===
Head coach: Abdelkhalek Louzani

No.	Pos.	Player	Date of birth (age)	Caps	Club
	GK	Khalid Fouhami	25 December 1972 (aged 20)		(Morocco) Wydad Casablanca
	GK	Mohamed Bouabdellaoui	3 August 1972 (aged 20)		(Morocco) Kawkab Marrakech
	DF	Jamal Drideb			(Morocco) Moghreb Tétouan
	DF	Boubker Ghandour			(Morocco) MAS Fez
	DF	Rachid Neqrouz	10 April 1972 (aged 21)		(Morocco) MC Oujda
	MF	Rachid Benmahmoud	14 September 1971 (aged 21)		(Morocco) Crédit Agricole de Rabat
	MF	Saïd Chiba	28 September 1970 (aged 22)		(Morocco) FUS Rabat
	MF	Aziz El Ouali	1 October 1970 (aged 22)		(France) Nîmes Olympique
	MF	Youssef Essadri			
	MF	Mohamed Foulouh			(Morocco) FAR Rabat
	MF	Boujemaa Kassab			(Morocco) Wydad Casablanca
	MF	Rachid Toufah			(Morocco) Wydad Casablanca
	FW	Abdelouahed Mouakil			
	FW	... Oustad			
		... Moradi			
		... Nafe			
		... Salhi			

=== Slovenia ===
Head coach: (Slovenia) Zdenko Verdenik

No.	Pos.	Player	Date of birth (age)	Caps	Club
	GK	Mladen Dabanovič	13 September 1971 (aged 21)		(Slovenia) NK Maribor
	GK	Janez Strajnar	20 April 1971 (aged 22)		(Slovenia) ND Slovan
	DF	Gregor Blatnik	15 December 1972 (aged 20)		(Slovenia) NK Celje
	DF	Franc Cifer	16 February 1971 (aged 22)		(Slovenia) NK Mura
	DF	Amir Karič	31 December 1973 (aged 19)		(Slovenia) NK Rudar Velenje
	DF	Aleš Križan	25 July 1971 (aged 21)		(Slovenia) NK Maribor
	DF	Miha Šporar	31 July 1972 (aged 20)		(Slovenia) NK Ljubljana
	MF	Peter Binkovski	28 June 1972 (aged 20)		(Slovenia) NK Maribor
	MF	Dušan Kosič	23 April 1971 (aged 22)		(Slovenia) NK Krka
	MF	Sašo Lukić	24 April 1973 (aged 20)		(Slovenia) NK Maribor
	MF	Miran Pavlin	8 October 1971 (aged 21)		(Slovenia) NK Naklo
	MF	Miloš Hudarin	18 June 1972 (aged 20)		(Slovenia) NK Olimpija Ljubljana
	MF	Anton Usnik	17 September 1973 (aged 19)		(Slovenia) NK Svoboda Ljubljana
	FW	Robert Marušič	10 August 1973 (aged 19)		(Slovenia) NK Naklo
	FW	Mladen Rudonja	26 July 1971 (aged 21)		(Slovenia) NK Izola
	FW	Ante Šimundža	28 September 1971 (aged 21)		(Slovenia) NK Maribor
	FW	Zlatko Zahovič	1 February 1971 (aged 22)		(Federal Republic of Yugoslavia) FK Partizan
	FW	Andrej Goršek	21 October 1970 (aged 22)		(Slovenia) NK Celje
