= Football at the 1997 Mediterranean Games – Men's team squads =

Below are the squads for the Football at the 1997 Mediterranean Games, hosted in Bari, Italy, and took place between 8 and 25 June 1997. Teams were national U-23 sides.

== Group A ==
=== Algeria ===
Head coach: Mustapha Aksouh

No.	Pos.	Player	Date of birth (age)	Caps	Club
	GK	Fouad Cheriet	10 January 1977 (aged 20)		(Algeria) CA Batna
	GK	Hichem Mezaïr	16 October 1976 (aged 20)		(Algeria) WA Tlemcen
	DF	Nassim Bounekdja	23 October 1976 (aged 20)		(Algeria) JS El Biar
	DF	Ouahid Fatahine			(Algeria) MC Alger
	DF	Tarek Ghoul	9 January 1975 (aged 22)		(Algeria) USM Alger
	DF	Moulay Haddou	14 June 1975 (aged 21)		(Algeria) MC Oran
	DF	Mohamed Hamdoud	9 June 1976 (aged 20)		(Algeria) USM Alger
	DF	Samir Khati			(Algeria) JS Kabylie
	DF	Samir Kherbouche	28 January 1976 (aged 21)		(Algeria) WA Tlemcen
	DF	Slimane Raho	20 October 1975 (aged 21)		(Algeria) MC Oran
	MF	Hocine Azizane	21 August 1976 (aged 20)		(Algeria) USM El Harrach
	MF	Hakim Boubrit	9 August 1974 (aged 22)		(Algeria) JS Kabylie
	MF	Rafik Diab			(Algeria) USM El Harrach
	MF	Farid Djahnine	18 August 1976 (aged 20)		(Algeria) USM Alger
	MF	Mourad Foudhili			(Algeria) MC Alger
	MF	Kheireddine Madoui	27 March 1977 (aged 20)		(Algeria) ES Sétif
	FW	Ryad Benchikha	5 March 1975 (aged 22)		(Algeria) USM El Harrach
	FW	Farès El Aouni	9 August 1977 (aged 19)		(Algeria) WA Tlemcen
	FW	Hamid Merakchi	28 January 1976 (aged 21)		(Algeria) ES Mostaganem
	FW	Fouad Smati			(Algeria) USM Alger

=== Libya ===
Head coach:

No.	Pos.	Player	Date of birth (age)	Caps	Club
	GK	Samir Aboud	29 September 1972 (aged 24)		(Libya) Al-Ittihad Tripoli
	DF	Khalifa Al-Magani	5 May 1974 (aged 23)		(Libya) Al Hilal Benghazi
	DF	Imaad Amer Al-Khafi			(Libya)
	MF	Hashem Jebril	30 November 1975 (aged 21)		(Libya) Al-Murooj Al-Marj
	MF	Aiman Akili	24 May 1978 (aged 19)		(Libya) Rafik Sorman
	FW	Khaled Shebli	2 September 1974 (aged 22)		(Libya) Al-Ittihad Tripoli

=== Slovenia ===
Head coach: Drago Kostanjšek

No.	Pos.	Player	Date of birth (age)	Caps	Goals	Club
	MF	Milenko Ačimovič	15 February 1977 (aged 20)			(Football Association of Slovenia) Olimpija
	DF	Samir Balagić	13 March 1975 (aged 22)			(Football Association of Slovenia) Rudar Velenje
	DF	Ingmar Bloudek	27 November 1975 (aged 21)			(Football Association of Slovenia) Mura
	MF	Danijel Brezič	15 February 1976 (aged 21)			(Football Association of Slovenia) Mura
	DF	Spasoje Bulajič	24 November 1975 (aged 21)			(Football Association of Slovenia) Maribor
	MF	Nastja Čeh	26 January 1978 (aged 19)			(Football Association of Slovenia) Maribor
	FW	Sebastjan Cimirotič	14 September 1974 (aged 22)			(Football Association of Slovenia) Olimpija
	MF	Robert Cugmas	2 October 1975 (aged 21)			(Football Association of Slovenia) Celje
	FW	Oskar Drobne	6 February 1975 (aged 22)			(Football Association of Slovenia) Maribor
	MF	Jernej Javornik	9 May 1975 (aged 22)			(Football Association of Slovenia) Rudar Velenje
	DF	Aleksander Knavs	5 December 1975 (aged 21)			(Football Association of Slovenia) Olimpija
	GK	Dino Lalič	12 July 1974 (aged 22)			(Football Association of Slovenia) Mura
	FW	Milan Osterc	4 July 1975 (aged 21)			(Football Association of Slovenia) Gorica
	FW	Ermin Rakovič	7 September 1977 (aged 19)			(Football Association of Slovenia) Olimpija
	MF	Andrej Razdrh	28 October 1976 (aged 20)			(Football Association of Slovenia) Primorje
	FW	Aljoša Sivko	18 January 1977 (aged 20)			(Football Association of Slovenia) Celje
	MF	Anton Žlogar	24 November 1977 (aged 19)			(Football Association of Slovenia) Primorje

=== Turkey ===
Head coach: (Turkey) Cem Pamiroğlu

No.	Pos.	Player	Date of birth (age)	Caps	Goals	Club
1	GK	Hakan Çalışkan	1 January 1978 (aged 19)	2	0	(Turkish Football Federation) Beşiktaş (loan to Muğlaspor)
2	DF	Emrah Eren	13 November 1978 (aged 18)	0	0	(Turkish Football Federation) Adanaspor
3	DF	Fatih Akyel	26 December 1977 (aged 19)	1	0	(Turkish Football Federation) Bakırköyspor
4	DF	Ali Eren Beşerler	25 October 1975 (aged 21)	7	0	(Turkish Football Federation) Gençlerbirliği
5	DF	Ümit Özat	30 October 1976 (aged 20)	6	0	(Turkish Football Federation) Gençlerbirliği
6	DF	Sinan Demircioğlu	23 April 1975 (aged 22)	2	0	(Turkish Football Federation) Beşiktaş
7	FW	İdris Gümüşdere	25 November 1976 (aged 20)			(Turkish Football Federation) Gençlerbirliği (loan to Adanaspor)
8	MF	Serdar Topraktepe	25 August 1976 (aged 20)			(Turkish Football Federation) Beşiktaş
9	FW	Mustafa Özkan	21 February 1975 (aged 22)			(Turkish Football Federation) Beşiktaş
10	FW	Serkan Aykut	24 February 1975 (aged 22)			(Turkish Football Federation) Samsunspor
11	FW	Çetin Güner	28 December 1977 (aged 19)			(Turkish Football Federation) Trabzonspor
12	GK	Kubilay Aydın	30 December 1975 (aged 21)			(Turkish Football Federation) Gençlerbirliği
13	MF	Hakkı Daş	1 February 1977 (aged 20)			(Turkish Football Federation) Kayseri Erciyesspor
14	MF	Erdal Eraslan	17 September 1977 (aged 19)			(Turkish Football Federation) Trabzonspor
15	MF	Hasan Yiğit	2 January 1975 (aged 22)			(Turkish Football Federation) Gaziantepspor
16	FW	Sinan Tanış	1 June 1976 (aged 21)			(Turkish Football Federation) Gaziantepspor
17	MF	Yıldıray Baştürk	24 December 1978 (aged 18)			(German Football Association) SG Wattenscheid 09
18	MF	Altan Aksoy	5 February 1976 (aged 21)			(Turkish Football Federation) Adanaspor
19	DF	Nuri Çolak	17 August 1975 (aged 21)			(Turkish Football Federation) Kocaelispor
20	DF	Ziya Şahin	6 April 1976 (aged 21)			(Turkish Football Federation) Vanspor
21	FW	Selahattin Kınalı	15 May 1978 (aged 19)			(Turkish Football Federation) Gümüşhanespor
22	DF	Ramazan Tunç	17 September 1975 (aged 21)			(Turkish Football Federation) Ankaragücü

== Group B ==
=== Albania ===
Coach: Sulejman Mema

No.	Pos.	Player	Date of birth (age)	Caps	Goals	Club
1	GK	Ermal Merxhushi				(Albanian Football Federation) KF Tirana
2	DF	Dritan Baholli	23 July 1974 (aged 22)			(Austrian Football Association) FK Austria Wien
3	DF	Blendi Haxhia	5 June 1974 (aged 23)			(Albanian Football Federation)
4	DF	Luan Pinari	27 October 1977 (aged 19)			(Albanian Football Federation) FK Dinamo Tirana
5	DF	Ardian Dashi	8 August 1975 (aged 21)			(Albanian Football Federation) KF Lushnja
6	DF	Lulzim Hushi	6 July 1976 (aged 20)			(Albanian Football Federation) KF Tirana
7	MF	Arjan Peço	26 April 1975 (aged 22)			(Albanian Football Federation) FK Partizani Tirana
8	MF	Devi Muka	21 December 1976 (aged 20)			(Albanian Football Federation) Flamurtari FC
9	FW	Auron Miloti	4 August 1974 (aged 22)			(Albanian Football Federation) KF Tirana
10	MF	Edi Martini	2 January 1975 (aged 22)			(Albanian Football Federation) KF Vllaznia Shkodër
11	FW	Mahir Halili	30 June 1975 (aged 21)			(Albanian Football Federation) FK Dinamo Tirana
12	GK	Anxhi Telaku				(Albanian Football Federation)
13	FW	Skerdilaid Curri	6 October 1975 (aged 21)			(Albanian Football Federation) FK Partizani Tirana
14	FW	Erjon Bogdani	14 April 1977 (aged 20)			(Albanian Football Federation) FK Partizani Tirana
15	MF	Herion Novaku	10 June 1976 (aged 21)			(Albanian Football Federation) FK Partizani Tirana
16	DF	Johan Driza	20 August 1976 (aged 20)			(Albanian Football Federation) Flamurtari FC
17	MF	Elton Marini	8 July 1974 (aged 22)			(Albanian Football Federation) FK Partizani Tirana
18	MF	Erion Matraku	25 October 1975 (aged 21)			(Albanian Football Federation)

=== Italy ===
Head coach: Marco Tardelli

No.	Pos.	Player	Date of birth (age)	Caps	Club
	GK	Gianluigi Buffon	28 January 1978 (aged 19)		(Italy) Parma
	GK	Matteo Gianello	7 May 1976 (aged 21)		(Italy) Chievo
	GK	Matteo Sereni	11 February 1975 (aged 22)		(Italy) Sampdoria
	DF	Alessandro Birindelli	12 November 1974 (aged 22)		(Italy) Empoli
	DF	Francesco Coco	8 January 1977 (aged 20)		(Italy) Milan
	DF	Alessandro Dal Canto	10 March 1975 (aged 22)		(Italy) Venezia
	DF	Alessandro Grandoni	22 July 1977 (aged 19)		(Italy) Lazio
	DF	Duccio Innocenti	20 September 1975 (aged 21)		(Italy) Lucchese
	DF	Emanuele Pesaresi	1 December 1976 (aged 20)		(Italy) Sampdoria
	DF	Fabio Rustico	20 May 1976 (aged 21)		(Italy) Atalanta
	DF	Marco Zamboni	7 December 1977 (aged 19)		(Italy) Chievo
	MF	Roberto Baronio	11 December 1977 (aged 19)		(Italy) Lazio
	MF	Jonathan Binotto	22 January 1975 (aged 22)		(Italy) Verona
	MF	Diego De Ascentis	31 July 1976 (aged 20)		(Italy) Bari
	MF	Stefano Fiore	17 April 1975 (aged 22)		(Italy) Chievo
	MF	Giuliano Giannichedda	21 September 1974 (aged 22)		(Italy) Udinese
	MF	Raffaele Longo	6 September 1977 (aged 19)		(Italy) Napoli
	FW	Marcello Campolonghi	15 February 1975 (aged 22)		(Italy) Brescia
	FW	Alessandro Iannuzzi	9 October 1975 (aged 21)		(Italy) Lazio
	FW	Cristiano Lucarelli	4 October 1975 (aged 21)		(Italy) Padova
	FW	Francesco Totti	27 September 1976 (aged 20)		(Italy) Roma
	FW	Nicola Ventola	24 May 1978 (aged 19)		(Italy) Bari

=== FR Yugoslavia ===
Head coach: Milan Živadinović

No.	Pos.	Player	Date of birth (age)	Caps	Goals	Club
	GK	Dragoslav Jevrić	8 July 1974 (aged 22)			(Football Association of Serbia and Montenegro) Red Star Belgrade
	GK	Dejan Pešić	16 December 1976 (aged 20)			(Football Association of Serbia and Montenegro) Radnički Niš
	GK	Darko Ljubanović	29 March 1976 (aged 21)			(Football Association of Serbia and Montenegro) Mogren
	DF	Milan Milijaš	12 October 1976 (aged 20)			(Football Association of Serbia and Montenegro) Zemun
	DF	Nenad Džodić	4 January 1977 (aged 20)			(Football Association of Serbia and Montenegro) Zemun
	DF	Ivica Dragutinović	13 November 1975 (aged 21)			(Royal Belgian Football Association) Gent
	MF	Darko Ljubojević	8 January 1975 (aged 22)			(Football Association of Serbia and Montenegro) Red Star Belgrade
	FW	Mihajlo Pjanović	13 February 1977 (aged 20)			(Football Association of Serbia and Montenegro) OFK Beograd
	MF	Slobodan Slović	9 February 1975 (aged 22)			(Football Association of Serbia and Montenegro) Železnik
	MF	Goran Trobok	6 September 1974 (aged 22)			(Football Association of Serbia and Montenegro) Budućnost Podgorica
	MF	Goran Bošković	11 October 1976 (aged 20)			(Football Association of Serbia and Montenegro) Red Star Belgrade
	DF	Mićo Vranješ	8 September 1975 (aged 21)			(Football Association of Serbia and Montenegro) Vojvodina
	FW	Nenad Jestrović	9 May 1976 (aged 21)			(Football Association of Serbia and Montenegro) OFK Beograd
	MF	Nikola Lazetić	9 February 1978 (aged 19)			(Football Association of Serbia and Montenegro) Red Star Belgrade
	MF	Ivan Tomić	5 January 1976 (aged 21)			(Football Association of Serbia and Montenegro) Partizan
	FW	Dragan Isailović	12 January 1976 (aged 21)			(Football Association of Serbia and Montenegro) Zemun

== Group C ==
=== France ===
Head coach: Raymond Domenech

No.	Pos.	Player	Date of birth (age)	Caps	Goals	Club
	GK	Tony Heurtebis	15 January 1975 (aged 22)			(French Football Federation) Rennes
	DF	Stéphane Pichot	2 September 1976 (aged 20)			(French Football Federation) Laval
	DF	Franck Jurietti	30 March 1975 (aged 22)			(French Football Federation) Gueugnon
	MF	Laurent Batlles	23 September 1975 (aged 21)			(French Football Federation) Toulouse
	FW	Kaba Diawara	16 December 1975 (aged 21)			(French Football Federation) Bordeaux
	FW	Frédéric Née	18 April 1975 (aged 22)			(French Football Federation) Caen
	MF	Ludovic Asuar	26 October 1976 (aged 20)			(French Football Federation) Marseille
	MF	Laurent Robert	21 May 1975 (aged 22)			(French Football Federation) Montpellier
	DF	François Grenet	8 March 1975 (aged 22)			(French Football Federation) Bordeaux
	DF	Romain Ferrier	24 February 1976 (aged 21)			(French Football Federation) Cannes
	DF	Djibril Diawara	3 January 1975 (aged 22)			(French Football Federation) Le Havre
	MF	Marc Zanotti	13 November 1975 (aged 21)			(French Football Federation) Bordeaux
	DF	Sébastien Schemmel	2 June 1975 (aged 22)			(French Football Federation) Nancy
	FW	Frédéric Machado	11 November 1975 (aged 21)			(French Football Federation) Lille
	DF	Olivier Tébily	19 December 1975 (aged 21)			(French Football Federation) Niort
	DF	Jean-Christophe Devaux	16 May 1975 (aged 22)			(French Football Federation) Lyon
	MF	Henri Savini	8 May 1975 (aged 22)			(French Football Federation) Nice
	DF	Bruno Calegari	13 May 1975 (aged 22)			(French Football Federation) Nice

=== Greece ===
Head coach: Ioannis Kollias

No.	Pos.	Player	Date of birth (age)	Caps	Club
	GK	Dimitrios Eleftheropoulos	7 August 1976 (aged 20)		(Greece) Olympiacos
	GK	Sotiris Liberopoulos	29 June 1977 (aged 19)		(Greece) Kalamata
	DF	Athanasios Kostoulas	24 March 1976 (aged 21)		(Greece) Kalamata
	DF	Georgios Koulakiotis	5 May 1977 (aged 20)		(Greece) Veria
	DF	Traianos Dellas	31 January 1976 (aged 21)		(Greece) Aris
	DF	Pantelis Konstantinidis	16 August 1975 (aged 21)		(Greece) Apollon Smyrnis
	DF	Paraskevas Antzas	18 August 1976 (aged 20)		(Greece) Xanthi
	DF	Giannis Goumas	24 May 1975 (aged 22)		(Greece) Panathinaikos
	DF	Dimitris Mavrogenidis	15 February 1975 (aged 22)		(Greece) Aris
	DF	Lazaros Semos	18 July 1975 (aged 21)		(Greece) Iraklis
	MF	Giorgos Karagounis	6 March 1977 (aged 20)		(Greece) Apollon Smyrnis
	MF	Vasilios Lakis	10 September 1976 (aged 20)		(Greece) Paniliakos
	MF	Stelios Sfakianakis	19 March 1976 (aged 21)		(Greece) Olympiacos
	MF	Vaggelis Koutsoures	2 February 1975 (aged 22)		(Greece) Kalamata
	MF	Giorgos Koltzos	13 September 1976 (aged 20)		(Greece) Athinaikos
	MF	Mike Panopoulos	9 October 1976 (aged 20)		(Greece) Aris
	MF	Kostas Kiassos	13 December 1975 (aged 21)		(Greece) OFI
	MF	Ieroklis Stoltidis	2 February 1976 (aged 21)		(Greece) Iraklis
	FW	Sotiris Konstantinidis	19 April 1977 (aged 20)		(Greece) Iraklis
	FW	Nikos Liberopoulos	4 August 1975 (aged 21)		(Greece) Panathinaikos

=== San Marino ===
Head coach:

No.	Pos.	Player	Date of birth (age)	Caps	Goals	Club
	GK	Federico Gasperoni	10 September 1976 (aged 20)			(Italian Football Federation) CBR Carli Pietracuta
	GK	Nicola Parenti				
	DF	Simone Bacciocchi	22 January 1977 (aged 20)			(San Marino Football Federation) FC Domagnano
	DF	Fabrizio Pelliccioni	13 October 1976 (aged 20)			(San Marino Football Federation) SS Folgore Falciano Calcio
	DF	Ferdinando Gasperoni				
	DF	Federico Moroni	8 September 1976 (aged 20)			(San Marino Football Federation) AC Juvenes/Dogana
	DF	Leone Gasperoni	3 September 1974 (aged 22)			(Italian Football Federation) CBR Carli Pietracuta
	DF	Mauro Marani	9 March 1975 (aged 22)			(San Marino Football Federation) S.S. Cosmos
	MF	Bryan Gasperoni	26 September 1974 (aged 22)			(Italian Football Federation) ASD Riccione 1929
	MF	Mirko Manzaroli	30 December 1979 (aged 17)			(San Marino Football Federation)
	MF	Federico Pelliccioni	13 October 1976 (aged 20)			(San Marino Football Federation) SS Folgore Falciano Calcio
	MF	Cristian Selva	5 July 1977 (aged 19)			(San Marino Football Federation) S.S. Cosmos
	MF	Damiano Vannucci	30 July 1977 (aged 19)			(Italian Football Federation) AC Bellaria Igea Marina
	MF	Alessandro Zanotti	27 July 1974 (aged 22)			(San Marino Football Federation) SS Folgore Falciano Calcio
	FW	Andrea Ugolini	23 July 1974 (aged 22)			(San Marino Football Federation) SP Tre Fiori
	FW	Matteo Mazza	19 September 1974 (aged 22)			(San Marino Football Federation)
	FW	Paolo Montagna	28 May 1976 (aged 21)			(San Marino Football Federation) AC Juvenes/Dogana

== Group D ==
=== Bosnia and Herzegovina ===
Head coach: Besim Šabić

No.	Pos.	Player	Date of birth (age)	Caps	Goals	Club
	GK	Almir Tolja	25 October 1974 (aged 22)			(Football Association of Bosnia and Herzegovina) Đerzelez
	DF	Zikret Buljina	10 October 1974 (aged 22)			(Football Association of Bosnia and Herzegovina) Čelik Zenica
	DF	Dženan Hošić	13 March 1976 (aged 21)			(Football Association of Bosnia and Herzegovina) FK Sarajevo
	DF	Elvis Mehadžić	13 December 1974 (aged 22)			(Football Association of Bosnia and Herzegovina) Jedinstvo Bihać
	MF	Almedin Hota	22 July 1976 (aged 20)			(Football Association of Bosnia and Herzegovina) Bosna Visoko
	MF	Zehrudin Kavazović	16 February 1975 (aged 22)			(Football Association of Bosnia and Herzegovina) Sloboda Tuzla
	MF	Vahidin Čahtarević	24 August 1976 (aged 20)			(Football Association of Bosnia and Herzegovina) Jedinstvo Bihać
	MF	Samir Muratović	25 February 1976 (aged 21)			(Football Association of Bosnia and Herzegovina) Drina Zvornik
	GK	Kenan Bećirević	6 October 1974 (aged 22)			(Football Association of Bosnia and Herzegovina) Bosna Visoko
	MF	Omer Joldić	1 January 1977 (aged 20)			(Football Association of Bosnia and Herzegovina) Sloboda Tuzla
	FW	Alen Mešanović	26 October 1975 (aged 21)			(Football Association of Bosnia and Herzegovina) Radnički Lukavac
	DF	Bojan Jurić	23 June 1975 (aged 21)			(Football Association of Bosnia and Herzegovina) Suhopolje
	FW	Marko Topić	1 January 1976 (aged 21)			(Swiss Football Association) FC Wil
	FW	Alen Avdić	3 April 1977 (aged 20)			(Football Association of Bosnia and Herzegovina) FK Sarajevo
	FW	Enes Mešanović	22 August 1975 (aged 21)			(Football Association of Bosnia and Herzegovina) Sloboda Tuzla
	DF	Ervin Smajlagić	7 March 1976 (aged 21)			(Football Association of Bosnia and Herzegovina) Jedinstvo Bihać
	MF	Edis Mulalić	23 October 1975 (aged 21)			(German Football Association) KFC Uerdingen 05
	MF	Dženan Uščuplić	18 August 1975 (aged 21)			(Football Association of Bosnia and Herzegovina) FK Sarajevo
	DF	Izudin Kamberović	23 February 1975 (aged 22)			(Football Association of Bosnia and Herzegovina) Bosna Visoko

=== Croatia ===
Head coach: Ivo Šušak

No.	Pos.	Player	Date of birth (age)	Caps	Goals	Club
	MF	Mario Bazina	8 September 1975 (aged 21)			(Croatian Football Federation) Hrvatski Dragovoljac
	MF	Ivan Bulat	24 June 1975 (aged 21)			(Croatian Football Federation) Osijek
	FW	Nino Bule	19 March 1976 (aged 21)			(Croatian Football Federation) NK Zagreb
	DF	Mario Cvitanović	6 May 1975 (aged 22)			(Croatian Football Federation) Dinamo Zagreb
	DF	Toni Grdić	23 May 1975 (aged 22)			(Croatian Football Federation) Šibenik
	MF	Ivan Jurić	25 August 1975 (aged 21)			(Croatian Football Federation) Hajduk Split
	MF	Domagoj Kosić	11 November 1975 (aged 21)			(Croatian Football Federation) Inker Zaprešić
	FW	Petar Krpan	1 July 1974 (aged 22)			(Croatian Football Federation) Osijek
	MF	Ivan Leko	7 February 1978 (aged 19)			(Croatian Football Federation) Hajduk Split
	DF	Mario Tokić	23 July 1975 (aged 21)			(Croatian Football Federation) Rijeka
	FW	Goran Tomić	18 March 1977 (aged 20)			(Croatian Football Federation) Šibenik
	DF	Igor Tudor	16 April 1978 (aged 19)			(Croatian Football Federation) Hajduk Split
	GK	Vladimir Vasilj	6 July 1975 (aged 21)			(Croatian Football Federation) Hrvatski Dragovoljac
	FW	Davor Vugrinec	24 March 1975 (aged 22)			(Croatian Football Federation) Varteks
	DF	Tonči Žilić	26 February 1975 (aged 22)			(Croatian Football Federation) Osijek
	DF	Boris Živković	15 November 1975 (aged 21)			(Croatian Football Federation) Hrvatski Dragovoljac

=== Spain ===
Head coach: Javier Clemente

No.	Pos.	Player	Date of birth (age)	Caps	Goals	Club
	FW	Iván Pérez	29 January 1976 (aged 21)			(Royal Spanish Football Federation) Extremadura
	GK	Francesc Arnau	23 March 1975 (aged 22)			(Royal Spanish Football Federation) FC Barcelona
	DF	Luis Cuartero	17 August 1975 (aged 21)			(Royal Spanish Football Federation) Zaragoza
	DF	Felipe Vaqueriza	23 January 1975 (aged 22)			(Royal Spanish Football Federation) Real Madrid
	DF	Gerardo García León	7 December 1974 (aged 22)			(Royal Spanish Football Federation) Lleida
	DF	Quique Álvarez	20 July 1975 (aged 21)			(Royal Spanish Football Federation) FC Barcelona
	DF	Sergio Ballesteros	4 September 1975 (aged 21)			(Royal Spanish Football Federation) Tenerife
	FW	Dani García	22 December 1974 (aged 22)			(Royal Spanish Football Federation) Zaragoza
	MF	Felipe Guréndez	18 November 1975 (aged 21)			(Royal Spanish Football Federation) Athletic Bilbao
	MF	Óscar Arpón	9 April 1975 (aged 22)			(Royal Spanish Football Federation) Real Betis
	MF	Juan Carlos Valerón	17 June 1975 (aged 21)			(Royal Spanish Football Federation) Las Palmas
