= Football at the 1993 Mediterranean Games =

1993 Mediterranean Games football tournament
Tournament details
- Host country: France
- City: Languedoc-Roussillon
- Dates: 16–27 June 1993
- Teams: 10

Final positions
- Champions: Turkey (1st title)
- Runners-up: Algeria
- Third place: France
- Fourth place: Italy

Tournament statistics
- Matches played: 16
- Goals scored: 43 (2.69 per match)
- Top scorer(s): (Turkey) Hakan Şükür (Turkey) Sergen Yalçın (4 goals each)

The 1993 Mediterranean Games football tournament was the 12th edition of the Mediterranean Games men's football tournament. The football tournament was held in Languedoc-Roussillon, France between 16 and 27 June 1993 as part of the 1993 Mediterranean Games and was contested by 10 teams. Countries were represented by their Olympic teams, except for host France, who took part with their U21 team. Turkey won the gold medal.

== Participating teams ==
Ten Olympic teams took part in the tournament, 3 teams from Africa and 7 teams from Europe. France participated with the under-21 team.

Federation	Nation
CAF Africa	Algeria; Morocco; Tunisia
AFC Asia	None
UEFA Europe	Bosnia and Herzegovina; Croatia; France (hosts); Greece; Italy; Slovenia; Turkey

== Venues ==
Cities	Venues	Capacity
Nîmes	Stade des Costières	19,000
Narbonne	Parc des Sports et de l'Amitié	12,000

== Tournament ==
All times local : CET (UTC+1)

Key to colours in group tables
Group winners advance to the Semi-finals

=== Group stage ===
==== Group A ====
Team	Pld	W	D	L	GF	GA	GD	Pts
Algeria	2	1	1	0	5	2	+3	3
Greece	2	1	0	1	4	5	−1	2
Bosnia and Herzegovina	2	0	1	1	2	4	−2	1

17 June 1993

Algeria	4–1	Greece
Zekri; Khiat; Hamdani		Goal

19 June 1993

Algeria	1–1	Bosnia and Herzegovina
Goal		Hibić

21 June 1993

Greece	3–1	Bosnia and Herzegovina
Tsiartas (pen.); Lagonikakis; Konstantinidis		Hibić

==== Group B ====
Team	Pld	W	D	L	GF	GA	GD	Pts
Turkey	3	2	1	0	7	3	+4	5
France	3	1	2	0	6	4	+2	4
Tunisia	3	1	0	2	2	5	−3	2
Croatia	3	0	1	2	5	8	−3	1

17 June 1993

Turkey	1–1	France
Şükür 84'	Report	Nouma 27'; Dugarry (red card) 32'

Stade Louis-Michel, Sète
Referee: Angelo Amendolia (Italy)
17 June 1993
20:00

Croatia	0–2	Tunisia
	Report	Baya 57'; Selimi 86'

Stade Pierre Pibarot, Alès
Attendance: 2,000
Referee: Giorgos Bikas (Greece)

19 June 1993

Croatia	2–3	Turkey
Gašpar 56'; Okuroğlu 81' (o.g.)	Report	Erdem 25'; Yalçın 40', 62'

Stade Louis-Michel, Sète
Attendance: 2,000
Referee: Merzak Nems (Algeria)
19 June 1993

France	2–0	Tunisia
Vairelles 84'; Gourvennec 86'

Stade Jean-Jacques Delmas, Mende

21 June 1993

Turkey	3–0	Tunisia
Yalçın 48'; Penbe 70'; Şükür 85'

Stade Louis-Michel, Sète
Referee: Milan Mitrović (Slovenia)
21 June 1993

France	3–3	Croatia
Nouma 11', 64' (pen.); Zidane 79'	Report	Vlaović 33'; Vučević 49'; Cvitanović 52'

Stade Pierre Pibarot, Alès
Attendance: 7,000
Referee: Salem Prolić (Bosnia and Herzegovina)

==== Group C ====
Team	Pld	W	D	L	GF	GA	GD	Pts
Italy	2	2	0	0	4	1	+3	4
Slovenia	2	0	1	1	1	2	−1	1
Morocco	2	0	1	1	0	2	−2	1

17 June 1993

Italy	2–0	Morocco
Bertarelli; Orlando

Stade Jean-Laffon, Perpignan
Referee: ? (France)

19 June 1993

Italy	2–1	Slovenia
Corini 24'; Vieri 88'		Zahovič 66' (pen.)

Stade Jean-Laffon, Perpignan
Referee: Serdar Çakman (Turkey)

21 June 1993

Morocco	0–0	Slovenia

Stade Jean-Laffon, Perpignan
Attendance: 2,000
Referee: Albert Wiltgen (Luxembourg)

=== Knockout stage ===
Semifinals
24 June –
Turkey	1
France	0
24 June –
Algeria	1
Italy	0

Final
27 June – Nîmes
Turkey	2
Algeria	0
Third place
27 June –
France	2
Italy	1

==== Semi-finals ====
24 June 1993

Turkey	1–0	France
Şükür 83'	Report

Stade Pierre Pibarot, Alès
Referee: Giorgos Bikas (Greece)

24 June 1993

Algeria	1–0	Italy
Zerrouki 50'	Report

Stade des Costières, Nîmes
Attendance: 3,000
Referee: Georges Ramos (France)

==== Third place match ====
26 June 1993

France	2–1	Italy
Vairelles 61'; Pedros 88'	Report	Delvecchio 30'

Stade des Costières, Nîmes
Attendance: 4,000
Referee: Mateo Beusan (Croatia)

==== Final ====
26 June 1993

Turkey	2–0	Algeria
Yalçın 62'; Şükür 88'; Ercan (red card) 90'	Report	Zekri (red card) 90'

Stade des Costières, Nîmes
Attendance: 11,000
Referee: Frédéric Philippoz (Switzerland)

== Tournament classification ==
Rank	Team	Pld	W	D	L	GF	GA	GD	Pts
1	Turkey	5	4	1	0	10	3	+7	9
2	Algeria	4	2	1	1	6	4	+2	5
3	France	5	2	2	1	8	6	+2	6
4	Italy	4	2	0	2	5	4	+1	4
Eliminated in the group stage
5	Greece	3	1	0	1	4	5	–1	2
6	Slovenia	2	0	1	1	1	2	–1	1
7	Tunisia	3	1	0	2	2	5	–3	2
8	Bosnia and Herzegovina	2	0	1	1	2	4	–2	1
9	Morocco	2	0	1	1	0	2	–4	1
10	Croatia	3	0	1	2	5	8	–3	1
