= Erwan Manac'h =

French footballer (born 1971)

Personal information
- Date of birth: 2 October 1971 (age 55)
- Place of birth: Brest, France
- Height: 1.88 m (6 ft 2 in)
- Position: Defender

Youth career
- –1990: Brest

Senior career*
Years	Team	Apps	(Gls)
1989–1991	Brest	21	(0)
1991–1994	Monaco	7	(0)
1992–1993	→ Épinal (loan)	25	(1)
1994–1996	Toulouse	63	(0)
1996–2002	Sochaux	170	(9)
Total		286	(10)

International career
- France U21
- * Club domestic league appearances and goals

Erwan Manac'h (born 2 October 1971) is a French former professional footballer who played as a defender.

== Club career ==
Manac'h played for 5 different clubs throughout his career: Brest, Monaco, Épinal, Toulouse, and Sochaux. He made a total of 61 appearances in the Division 1 in the process. In the 2000–01 season, he finished as Division 2 champion with Sochaux.

== International career ==
Manac'h represented France at youth level. He finished runner-up at the 1991 Toulon Tournament and was part of the squad that participated at the 1993 Mediterranean Games.

== After football ==
Later in his life, Manac'h went on to work in marketing for Adidas.

== Honours ==
Brest U19

- Coupe Gambardella: 1989–90

Sochaux

- Division 2: 2000–01

France U21

- Toulon Tournament runner-up: 1991

Individual

- UNFP Division 2 Team of the Year: 1997–98
