= Albania national under-23 football team =

National U-23 association football team

Albania Under-23
- Nickname(s): Kuqezinjtë (The Red and Blacks); Shqiponjat (The Eagles)
- Association: Federata Shqiptare e Futbollit (FSHF)
- Confederation: UEFA
- Most caps: Millan Vaso (15)
- Top scorer: Ilir Përnaska (9)
- FIFA code: ALB
First colours	Second colours	Third colours

First international
- Greece 1–0 Albania (Bucharest, Romania; 25 June 1969)

Last international
- Italy 4–0 Albania (Foggia, Italy; 19 June 1997)

Biggest win
- Albania 6–0 Turkey (Bucharest, Romania; 28 June 1969)

Biggest defeat
- Bulgaria 1–0 Albania (Athens, Greece; 7 July 1971)

Medal record

Balkan Youth Championship U23
Bronze medal – third place	1969	Team
Bronze medal – third place	1970	Team
Silver medal – second place	1974	Team
Bronze medal – third place	1976	Team

The Albania national under-23 football team represents Albania in international football at this age level and is controlled by Albanian Football Association, the governing body for football in Albania. The team competed in the UEFA European Under-23 Championship and Balkan Youth Championship, but after the rule change in 1975, the event had an age limit of 21.

== History ==
=== Balkan Youth Championship ===
Albania Under-23 participated in the Balkan Youth Championship tournaments from 1969 until 1976 when the age limit rule changed to the under 21, and then Albania participated with the Albania national under 21 football team. In two first tournament 1969 & 1970, Albania U23 was ranked 3rd out 5 national teams Participations in both occasions. Then in the 1971 & 1972 tournament they were ranked in the 4th place in both cases. They withdrew from the 1973 tournament and in the 1974 edition, Albania U23 managed to reach the final after winning Group B against Turkey U23 & Greece U23. In the final they lost 1–0 against Romania U23.

=== UEFA European Under-23 Championship ===
Albania U23 participated in 2 out 3 UEFA European Under-23 Championship in 1972 & 1974 where they were eliminated in both cases in the qualifying stages.

=== 1991 Mediterranean Games ===
==== Group stage – Group B ====
Team	Pld	W	D	L	GF	GA	GD	Pts
Greece	2	2	0	0	8	0	+8	4
Albania	2	1	0	1	2	6	−4	2
Algeria	2	0	0	2	1	5	−4	0

1991

Greece	5 – 0	Albania
	Report

Athens

1991

Albania	2 – 1	Algeria
	Report

Athens

=== 1997 Mediterranean Games ===
==== Group stage – Group B ====
Team	Pld	W	D	L	GF	GA	GD	Pts
Italy	2	1	1	0	4	0	+4	4
FR Yugoslavia	2	1	1	0	3	1	+2	4
Albania	2	0	0	2	1	7	−6	0

June 1997

FR Yugoslavia	3 – 1	Albania
	Report	Bogdani 60'

Stadio Comunale, Barletta, Italy
Referee: S. Tivolo (Slovenia)

June 1997

Albania	0 – 4	Italy
	Report

Stadio Pino Zaccheria, Foggia, Italy
Referee: Sabri Celik (Turkey)

== Players individual records ==
=== Top appearances ===
Rank	Position	Name	Career	Caps	Goals
1	MF	Millan Vaso	1970–1974	15	0
2	FW	Agim Janku	1970–1971	13	3
2	FW	Ilir Përnaska	1970–1972	13	9
4	MF	Iljaz Çeço	1969–1971	12	5
4	MF	Naim Allaj	1970–1974	12	0
6	MF	Sabah Bizi	1969–1971	11	2
6	MF	Faruk Sejdini	1970–1971	11	0
6	MF	Gjergji Thaka	1970–1971	11	0
9	DF	Perikli Dhales	1969–1971	10	0
9	GK	Bashkim Muhedini	1969–1971	10	0
9	DF	Safet Berisha	1969–1971	10	0
9	DF	Mihal Gjika	1969–1970	10	0

=== Top goalscorers ===
Rank	Position	Name	Career	Goals	Caps
1	FW	Ilir Përnaska	1970–1972	9	13
2	MF	Iljaz Çeço	1969–1971	5	12
3	FW	Agim Janku	1970–1971	3	13
3	MF	Muharrem Karriqi	1970–1971	3	13
5	MF	Sabah Bizi	1969–1971	2	11
5	FW	Ramazan Rragami	1969	2	3
5	MF	Bali	1969–1971	2	7
5	FW	Luan Metani	1976	2	1
5	MF	Ardian Arra	1976	2	3
5	FW	Shyqyri Ballgjini	1974–1976	2	6

== Competitive record ==
=== UEFA European Under-23 Championship Record ===
UEFA European Under-23 Championship record
Year	Round	GP	W	D	L	GS	GA
1972	Qualifying Stage	6	0	3	3	2	7
1974	Qualifying Stage	4	1	1	2	3	9
1976	Did Not Enter						
Total	0/2	10	1	4	5	5	16

=== Balkan Youth Championship Record ===
Balkan Youth Championship record
Year	Round	Position	Pld	W	D*	L	GF	GA
(Greece) 1968	Did Not Enter							
(Romania) 1969	Group Ch.	3rd	4	2	0	2	9	4
(Bulgaria) 1970	Group Ch.	3rd	4	2	1	1	3	2
(Greece) 1971	Group Ch.	4th	4	0	2	2	8	11
(Turkey) 1972	Semi-final	4th	3	1	0	2	3	5
(Socialist Federal Republic of Yugoslavia) 1973	Group Ch.	Withdrew						
(Romania) 1974	Runners-Up	2nd	3	1	1	1	3	3
(Bulgaria) 1975	Did Not Enter							
(Greece) 1976	Third Place	3rd	3	1	1	1	5	5
Total	Best:Runners-Up	6/8	21	7	4	9	31	30

*Denotes draws include knockout matches decided on penalty shoot-out.
**Gold background colour indicates that the tournament was won.

=== Mediterranean Games - Football ===
Football at the Mediterranean Games record
Year	Round	Position	GP	W	D	L	GS	GA
(Greece) 1991	Group stage	6th	2	1	0	1	2	6
(Italy) 1997	Group stage	11th	2	0	0	2	1	7
Total	0/2	Best: 6th	4	1	0	3	3	13

== See also ==
- Albania national football team
- Albania national under-21 football team
- Albania national under-20 football team
- Albania national under-19 football team
- Albania national under-18 football team
- Albania national under-17 football team
- Albania national under-16 football team
- Albania national under-15 football team
- Albania national football team results
- Albania national youth football team
- Albanian Superliga
- Football in Albania
- List of Albania international footballers
