= Ali Eren Beşerler =

Turkish footballer

Personal information
- Date of birth: 25 October 1975 (age 50)
- Place of birth: Ankara, Turkey
- Height: 1.83 m (6 ft 0 in)
- Position: Defender

Youth career
- 1992–1994: Gençlerbirliği

Senior career*
Years	Team	Apps	(Gls)
1994–1997	Gençlerbirliği	60	(1)
1997–2003	Beşiktaş	90	(0)
2003–2004	Çaykur Rizespor	8	(0)
2004–2005	Kocaelispor	12	(0)
Jan.-Jun.2005	Akçaabat Sebatspor	12	(1)
2005–2006	Altay	10	(0)
2006–2007	Sivasspor	0	(0)
Jan.-Jun.2007	Turgutluspor	3	(0)
Total		195	(2)

International career
1996–1997	Turkey U21	13	(0)
1999	Turkey	6	(0)
Medal record
Representing Turkey
Mediterranean Games
Men's Football
Silver medal – second place	1997 Bari	Team competition
- * Club domestic league appearances and goals

Ali Eren Beşerler (born 25 October 1975) is a former Turkish international footballer. He played 170 matches at Süper Lig, from 1994 to 2005.

== Career ==
=== Gençlerbirliği ===
Beşerler started his career at hometown club, the capital giant Gençlerbirliği. He played 18 league matches for the club youth team at PAF League (reserve league) in 1992–93 season and 12 league appearances and 2 goals in BAL Ligi for the amateur team. In 1994–95 season he was promoted to first team. At Gençlerbirliği he started to play for Turkey U21 since April 1996 and selected to 1997 Mediterranean Games.

=== Beşiktaş ===
He was offered a new 2-year contract by Gençlerbirliği after the tournament, but in October 1997, he was sold to Beşiktaş. He played 5 league matches in the first season, and played as a regular, played 23 starts, and made him received a call-up to national team. He also signed a new 4-year contract with club. With Turkey he played all 6 caps as starter, and helped Turkey qualify for UEFA Euro 2000. But in club level he just played 7 league matches at 1999-2000 and all from September to December, thus not selected to the UEFA Euro 2000 final tournament. In the next 2 seasons he played 39 league matches and all as starter. In his final season, he just played 13 starts and 2 substitutes appearances.

At the beginning of the 2001/2002 season he was recruited by his former coach Nevio Scala to Serie B outfit Genoa and initially signed a 4-year contract at $1 million per year. After the club's doctors identified an issue on his left knee and asked for further tests, Beşerler chose to cancel the contract and return to Beşiktaş instead.

=== Late career ===
In August 2003 he signed for Süper Lig newcomer Çaykur Rizespor on free transfer. But he just played 8 league matches. He then played for Kocaelispor at TFF First League, Süper Lig newcomer Akçaabat Sebatspor, Altay at TFF First League, Sivasspor at Süper Lig and lastly for Turgutluspor at TFF Second League.

== Honours ==
Beşiktaş J.K.

- Süper Lig: 2002-03

== International statistics ==
International appearances and goals
#	Date	Venue	Opponent	Result	Goal	Competition
1.	5 June 1999	Helsinki, Finland	Finland	4–2	0	UEFA Euro 2000 qualifying
2.	4 September 1999	Belfast, Northern Ireland, United Kingdom	Northern Ireland	3–0	0	UEFA Euro 2000 qualifying
3.	8 September 1996	Chişinău, Moldova	Moldova	1–1	0	UEFA Euro 2000 qualifying
4.	9 October 1999	Munich, Germany	Germany	0–0	0	UEFA Euro 2000 qualifying
5.	13 November 1999	Dublin, Republic of Ireland	Republic of Ireland	1–1	0	UEFA Euro 2000 qualifying
6.	17 November 1999	Bursa, Turkey	Republic of Ireland	0–0	0	UEFA Euro 2000 qualifying
