= Luigi Di Biagio =

Italian footballer (born 1971)

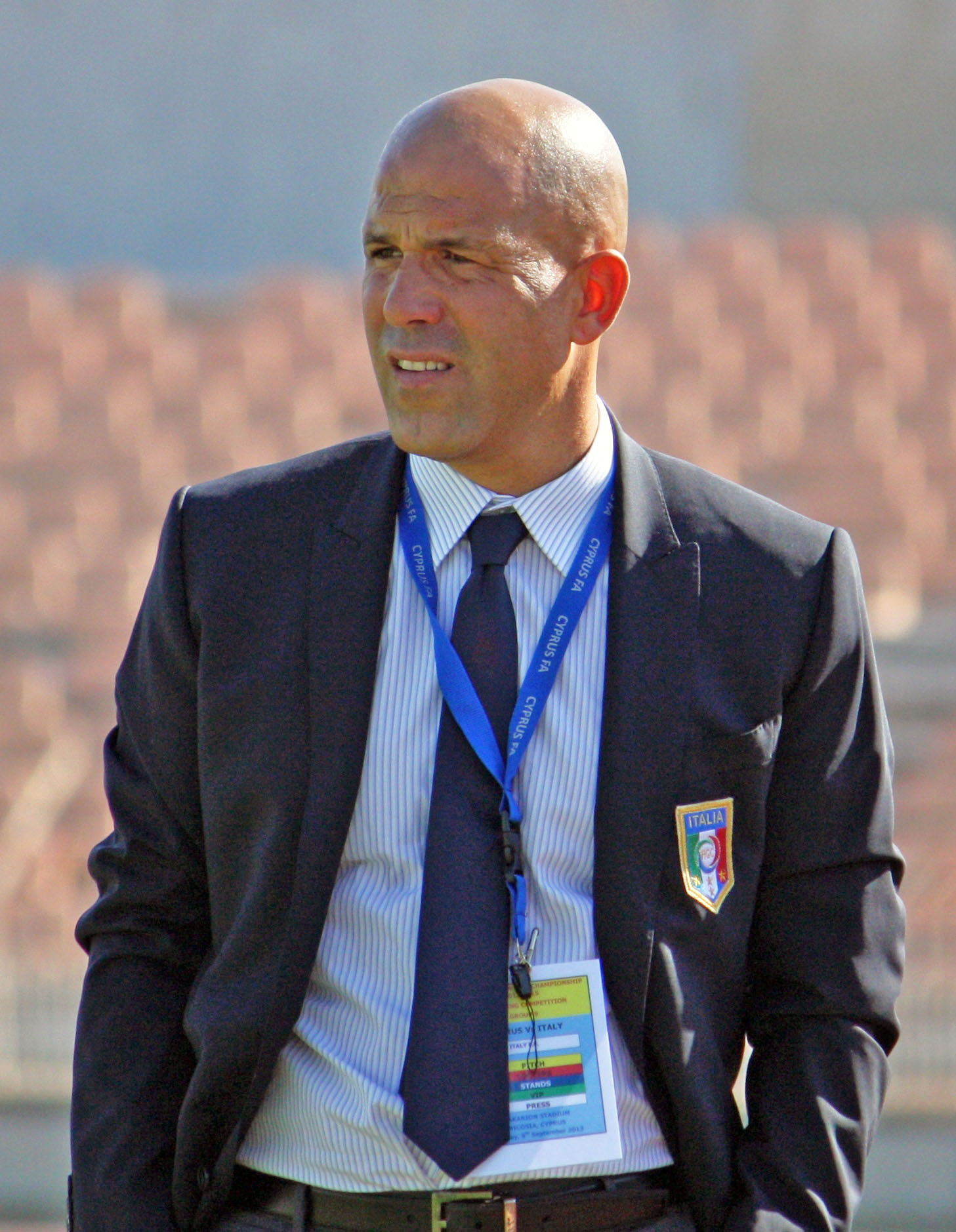
- Di Biagio as head coach of Italy U21 in 2013

Personal information
- Full name: Luigi Di Biagio
- Date of birth: 3 June 1971 (age 55)
- Place of birth: Rome, Italy
- Height: 1.75 m (5 ft 9 in)
- Positions: Midfielder; defender

Youth career
- Lazio

Senior career*
Years	Team	Apps	(Gls)
1988–1989	Lazio	1	(0)
1989–1992	Monza	62	(7)
1992–1995	Foggia	87	(12)
1995–1999	Roma	114	(16)
1999–2003	Inter Milan	117	(13)
2003–2006	Brescia	93	(16)
2007	Ascoli	8	(2)
Total		482	(66)

International career
1998–2002	Italy	31	(2)

Managerial career
- 2011–2013: Italy U20
- 2013–2019: Italy U21
- 2018: Italy (caretaker)
- 2020: SPAL
- 2023: Dinamo City
- 2025–: Saudi Arabia U23
Medal record
Men's football
Representing Italy
UEFA European Championship
Runner-up	2000 Belgium-Netherlands
- * Club domestic league appearances and goals

Luigi Di Biagio Cavaliere OMRI (Italian pronunciation: [luˈiːdʒi di ˈbjaːdʒo]; born 3 June 1971) is an Italian professional football manager and former player who is currently managing Saudi Arabia U23.

A former midfielder, Di Biagio last played for Ascoli in 2007, and previously also played for several other Italian clubs throughout his career, including Roma and Inter Milan, in particular. At international level, he also played 31 times for the Italy national side between 1998 and 2002, scoring two goals, representing his country at the 1998 and 2002 World Cups, as well as at Euro 2000, where Italy reached the final.

== Club career ==
=== Early career: Lazio, Monza, and Foggia ===
Di Biagio was born in Rome, on 3 June 1971. He initially played for Lazio (1988–89), making his Serie A debut with the side, and later played for Monza (1989–92) in Serie B and Serie C1, winning the Coppa Italia C1 in 1991. He later moved on to play for Foggia (1992–95) under Zeman, where he gained promotion to Serie A once again, establishing himself in the starting lineup of the club as a defensive minded central midfielder, who also served as a playmaker; he notably reached the semi-final of the Coppa Italia with Foggia during the 1994–95 season, attracting the attention of bigger Italian clubs.

=== Roma ===
Di Biagio began to achieve greater international exposure and fame in Italy due to his excellent and consistent performances whilst playing for Roma (1995–99), where he remained for five seasons, under managers Carlo Mazzone, Carlos Bianchi and Zeman once again; he would make his career debut in European Competitions with the club. During his time at Roma, he was able to help the squad to a fourth-place finish during the 1997–98 season, and managed to subsequently reach the quarter-finals of the 1998–99 UEFA Cup and the 1997–98 Coppa Italia. His consistent performances led him to become a permanent member of the Italy national side during this period. Di Biagio would make 140 appearances for Roma in all competitions, scoring 18 goals. 15 of his goals were scored in Serie A in 114 appearances.

=== Inter Milan ===
At the beginning of the 1999–2000 Serie A season, Di Biagio transferred to Inter Milan, and became a regular first team member due to his continued high standard of performance. During the 2001–02 season, he narrowly missed out on winning the Serie A title to Juventus on the final match-day; he received criticism, however, for his despondent performance in a 4–2 defeat to Lazio at the Stadio Olimpico in Rome, on his final league appearance of the season, despite initially scoring a goal during the match. Di Biagio remained at Inter until 2003, and during his four years at the club, he amassed 163 appearances, scoring a total of 18 goals in all competitions.

Although he was unable to win a title during his time with the club, he did manage to reach the semi-finals of the 2001–02 UEFA Cup with Inter, losing out to eventual Champions Feyenoord. He also reached the semi-finals of the 2002–03 Champions League with Inter, under manager Héctor Cúper, losing out to cross-city rivals and eventual Champions Milan on away goals. He also managed to win runners up medals in Serie A during the 2002–03 season under Cuper, as well as in the Coppa Italia during the 1999–2000 season, and the Italian Supercup in 2000, under Marcello Lippi.

=== Brescia ===
Di Biagio subsequently moved to Brescia (2003–2006) during his later career, where he played alongside Roberto Baggio during the 2003–04 season, frequently playing as a sweeper or as a centreback/secondary defensive playmaker in Brescia's three-man defence. Although Di Biagio managed a personal best of nine goals in Serie A the following year, Brescia were relegated to Serie B during the 2004–05 season, and Di Biagio finished his final season at Brescia playing in the Italian second division during the 2005–06 season.

=== Later career with Ascoli and retirement ===
Di Biagio signed for Ascoli in November 2006, but the bid was not considered to be valid by the federation, since the player was not released for free by Brescia before the 30 June deadline. The bid was therefore postponed until January 2007, and in the meantime Di Biagio went on training with Ascoli, and played from November to December with Promozione club Polisportiva La Storta from Rome, coached by his friend and former Dundee and Lazio footballer Alessandro Romano. Di Biagio played his first Ascoli match on 14 January 2007, against Cagliari. He collected only seven appearances that season, scoring two goals in 523 minutes. Ascoli finished second last in Serie A that season, and were relegated to Serie B. He retired at the end of the season, and returned to Polisportiva La Storta as a youth coach.

Despite his reputation and ability as a midfielder, Di Biagio had an unfortunate club and international career, failing to win a major trophy, and only winning the Coppa Italia Serie C1 with Monza.

== International career ==
Di Biagio was a regular member of the national side during the late 1990s and early 2000s, and was capped 31 times for Italy between 1998 and 2002, scoring two goals. He represented Italy at Under-23 level at the 1993 Mediterranean games, where they reached the final under manager Cesare Maldini. He made his senior debut for Italy on 28 January 1998, in a 3–0 friendly home win against Slovakia, under Cesare Maldini.

After a strong season with Roma, Di Biagio represented his country in the 1998 World Cup, appearing in each of Italy's five matches, and scoring a headed goal from a Roberto Baggio cross in the second group stage match against Cameroon, which ended in a 3–0 win for Italy; his goal being the 100th goal for Italy in World Cup matches. In the round of 16 match against Norway, Di Biagio set up Vieri's match-winning goal, and helped Italy to keep a clean sheet. Despite a strong tournament, in which he was considered to be one of the best performing midfielders, he missed the decisive penalty in the quarter-final shootout against hosts and eventual champions France, after a 0–0 deadlock following extra time, hitting the crossbar, as Italy were eliminated from the tournament.

Di Biagio continued to be a key player for Italy under Dino Zoff, and he went on to represent Italy at Euro 2000, starting alongside Albertini in midfield, and winning a runners-up medal as Italy lost 2–1 to France in the final on a golden goal. Di Biagio had another successful tournament for Italy, and he scored Italy's first goal against Sweden, heading in a Del Piero corner, in Italy's final group match, which ended in a 2–1 win, and which allowed Italy to top their group and progress to the quarter-finals. In the victorious semi-final penalty shootout against co-hosts the Netherlands, he took Italy's first penalty, and was able to convert it successfully on this occasion. It was the first penalty he had taken after the infamous miss which struck the crossbar during the 1998 World Cup, which immediately eliminated Italy from the competition.

Under Giovanni Trapattoni, Di Biagio was also a member of Italy's 2002 World Cup squad that was eliminated by co-hosts South Korea in the round of 16 following a 2–1 loss on a golden goal. Di Biagio made his only appearance of the tournament in Italy's opening group match, a 2–0 win against Ecuador on 3 June, which was his birthday, where he assisted Vieri's second goal of the match with a long ball, in the 27th minute; he was substituted by Gattuso in the 69th minute, and was ruled out for the remainder of the tournament due to injury. The lack of deep-lying playmakers and creativity in Italy's midfield as a result of Di Biagio's absence, and the team's consequent inability to control games in midfield was highlighted in the media as one of the reason's for their unexpected early elimination from the tournament. Di Biagio made his final appearance for Italy in a 1–1 friendly draw against Turkey, in Pescara, on 20 November 2002.

== Style of play ==
Di Biagio was regarded one of Italy's best and most consistent midfielders during the later 1990s and early 2000s, and one of the best players in the world in his position during his prime, consistently providing excellent performances for Roma, Inter and the Italy national side; he often stood out throughout his career for his leadership. Di Biagio was a complete, tenacious and combative defensive midfielder, whose best strengths involved quickly breaking up the opposition's attacks, although he was also capable of getting forward when needed, due to his ability to make attacking runs into the area, which enabled him to contribute to his team's offensive play with goals. Furthermore, he was known for his ability to either set the tempo of his team's build-up plays with short exchanges, or start counter-attacks with long balls after winning back possession. Throughout his career, Di Biagio earned a reputation as a strong, aggressive and hard-tackling midfielder, who had a knack for picking up cards; after Paolo Montero, he is the player with the most red cards in Serie A history (12). He is also the tenth most booked players in Serie A history, with 104 yellow cards in 391 appearances in the Italian top flight.

Although he was primarily deployed as a central or defensive midfielder, Di Biagio was capable of playing anywhere in midfield due to his tactical versatility, and played in every outfield position throughout his career, and was occasionally played in an attacking midfield role behind the forwards, or, even less frequently, as a centre-forward; he also played as a defender later in his career, once he lost his pace, functioning as a sweeper, as a full-back, or as a central defender. A hardworking player, Di Biagio was gifted with power, stamina, and tactical intelligence, as well as an acute defensive awareness and positional sense. He combined these attributes with a surprising technical ability, and was also capable of functioning creatively as a deep-lying playmaker in midfield, due to his ball control, vision, and passing range. Indeed, his central holding midfield role under Zdeněk Zeman in the manager's 4–3–3 system has also been likened to that of a metodista ("centre-half," in Italian football jargon), due to Di Biago's ability to dictate play in midfield, launch quick attacks, or assist his team defensively, as well as to maintain his position and thus allowing his teams to maintain a high defensive line with little space between the attack and the defence. Despite his more defensive playing role in midfield, Di Biagio also possessed a powerful shot from distance, and was a dangerous free kick and penalty kick taker, which also enabled him to contribute offensively Additionally, he excelled in the air, in spite of his relatively short stature, due to his elevation, physical strength, and heading accuracy, which made him a goal threat in the opposing box during set-pieces.

== Managerial career ==
Following his retirement from Ascoli in 2007, Di Biagio returned to football, signing a contract with the amateur 1993 youth side La Polisportiva La Storta as a youth coach, in 2008. In August 2007, he signed a contract with Cisco Roma as a youth coach. In July 2008, he had managed to officially obtain his first degree coaching licence.

On 25 July 2011, he was named the coach of Italy's under-20 side. On 2 July 2013, Luigi Di Biagio stepped up an age group to replace Devis Mangia as Italy's under-21 coach. He made his debut as the Italy under-21 coach on 14 August 2013, in a friendly match against Slovakia, which was won 4–1 by Italy. He eventually helped the U-21 side to qualify for the upcoming 2015 Under-21 European Championship in the Czech Republic, as Italy defeated Slovakia once again in the play-offs.

In the final tournament, Italy were placed in a group containing England and eventual finalists Portugal and Sweden, the latter of whom would go on to win the tournament. Italy finished third in their group, and were eliminated in the first round with four points.

Di Biagio led the Italy under-21 side to the semi-finals of the 2017 UEFA European Under-21 Championship, where they were eliminated by Spain on 27 June, following a 3–1 defeat.

On 5 February 2018, Di Biagio was confirmed to be the caretaker manager of the senior Italy team for their two friendlies on 23 and 27 March 2018 against Argentina and England respectively. On 17 March 2018, Di Biagio called up veteran goalkeeper Gianluigi Buffon for the two friendlies, despite his initial decision to retire. Di Biagio's first match as Italy coach ended in a 2–0 defeat to Argentina. His second, and final match as caretaker manager, ended in a 1–1 draw to England. On 15 May, it was announced Di Biagio would return to the under-21 side, after the appointment of Roberto Mancini.

Following the Italy U-21 side's first-round elimination in the 2019 UEFA European Under-21 Championship, held on home soil, Di Biagio announced his resignation as the under-21 side's manager on 25 June 2019.

On 10 February 2020, he was officially nominated as the new coach of Serie A team S.P.A.L. following the sacking of Leonardo Semplici. With fifteen matches still to be played, the club were at the bottom of Serie A at the time of his nomination. On 2 August 2020, his contract was terminated by mutual consent.

Following a three-year hiatus, Di Biagio returned to coaching on 2 August 2023, when he was appointed as the new manager of Albanian club Dinamo City. However, on 23 October of the same year, he resigned from his position, with the club sitting in second-last place in the league at the time of his departure.

On 31 August 2024, he was named the manager of the Saudi Arabia national under-23 football team.

== Outside of football ==
Since retiring from professional football, Di Biagio has also briefly worked as a football pundit and commentator on Sky Sport in 2010.

In the early 2020s, he also worked for DAZN.

== Career statistics ==
=== International ===
Appearances and goals by national team and year
National team	Year	Apps	Goals
Italy	1998	10	1
Italy	1999	3	0
Italy	2000	7	1
Italy	2001	3	0
Italy	2002	8	0
Total		31	2

=== International Goals ===
List of international goals scored by Luigi Di Biaglio
No.	Date	Venue	Opponent	Score	Result	Competition
1	17 June 1998	Stade de la Mosson, Montpellier, France	Cameroon	1–0	3–0	1998 FIFA World Cup
2	19 June 2000	Philips Stadion, Eindhoven, Netherlands	Sweden	1–0	2–1	UEFA Euro 2000

== Managerial statistics ==
As of match played 8 October 2023

Managerial record by team and tenure
Team	Nat	From	To	Record							
Team	Nat	From	To	G	W	D	L	GF	GA	GD	Win %
Italy U20	(Italy)	25 July 2011	2 July 2013	19	10	3	6	45	33	+12	52.63
Italy U21	(Italy)	2 July 2013	25 June 2019	59	28	13	18	101	62	+39	47.46
Italy (caretaker)	(Italy)	5 February 2018	14 May 2018	2	0	1	1	1	3	−2	0.00
SPAL	(Italy)	10 February 2020	2 August 2020	15	1	2	12	10	37	−27	6.67
Dinamo Tirana	(Albania)	1 August 2023	10 October 2023	9	2	1	6	8	14	−6	22.22
Total				103	41	20	42	165	149	+16	39.81

== Honours ==
=== Player ===
Inter Milan

- Serie A runner-up: 2002–03
- Coppa Italia runner-up: 2000
- Supercoppa Italiana runner-up: 2000

Monza

- Coppa Italia Serie C1: 1990–91

Italy

- UEFA European Championship runner-up: 2000

Italy U23

- Mediterranean Games: 4th place 1993

Individual

- AC Monza Hall of Fame

Orders

5th Class / Knight: Cavaliere Ordine al Merito della Repubblica Italiana: 2000
