= Dağdelen =

Dağdelen is a Turkish given name for males and a surname. Notable people with the surname include:

- Sevim Dağdelen, German politician
- Uğur Dağdelen, Turkish footballer
- Aydın Dağdelen, retired Turkish goalkeeper
