= Sinan Demircioğlu =

Turkish footballer

Personal information
- Date of birth: 23 April 1975 (age 51)
- Place of birth: Istanbul, Turkey
- Height: 1.75 m (5 ft 9 in)
- Position: Defender

Youth career
- 1991–1995: Beşiktaş

Senior career*
Years	Team	Apps	(Gls)
1995–2000	Beşiktaş	29	(0)
1997–2000	→ İstanbul BB (loan)	71	(4)
2000–2002	İstanbul BB	63	(1)
2002–2003	Göztepe	33	(1)
2003–2006	Diyarbakırspor	87	(2)
2006	Gaziantepspor	2	(0)
2006–2008	Samsunspor	40	(0)
2008–2012	Körfez Belediyespor	31	(0)

International career
1996–1997	Turkey U21	2	(0)
Medal record
Representing Turkey
Mediterranean Games
Men's Football
Silver medal – second place	1997 Bari	Team competition
- * Club domestic league appearances and goals

Sinan Demircioğlu (born 23 April 1975) is a Turkish retired footballer.

Sinan Demircioğlu is a former Turkey U21 internationals and has been played 151 matches in Süper Lig, 74 matches in 1. Lig and 100 matches at 1. Lig prior it reduced from 50 teams to 20 teams in 2001.

== Career ==
=== Beşiktaş ===
Sinan Demircioğlu started his career at Beşiktaş which is one of the Turkish Big-Three. He was promoted to first team in 1995-96 season aged 20. Before that, he also played for the youth teams at PAF League and BAL Ligi. With Beşiktaş, he was call-up to Turkey U18 team at 1992 UEFA European Under-18 Football Championship and 1993 UEFA European Under-18 Football Championship qualification. He also played for Turkish U20 team at 1993 FIFA World Youth Championship, Turkish Olympic team (de facto U21 team) at 1997 Mediterranean Games.

=== İstanbul Büyükşehir Belediyespor ===
After the tournament he was loaned to İstanbul Büyükşehir Belediyespor of TFF First League (at that time Second League prior the formation of the Turkish Super League) which also located in Istanbul. He played for the club for 5 seasons.

=== Göztepe & Diyarbakırspor ===
Sinan Demircioğlu returned to the Turkish top division in 2002–03 season, signed for Göztepe. After a season he left for Diyarbakırspor where he played another 3 seasons in the Turkish Süper Lig.

=== Late career ===
In August 2006 he left for his last Super League club Gaziantepspor on free transfer, but in September 2006 he signed for Samsunspor of TFF First League. He just played 16 times in his second season before he left the club as free agent.

In August 2008 he was signed by Körfez Belediyespor of TFF Second League.

== Honours ==
- Beşiktaş
  - Chancellor Cup: 1997
- Turkey
  - UEFA European Under-18 Football Championship: 1992

== Career statistics ==
Club statistics

As of 20 December 2009

Club performance			League		Cup		Continental		Total	
Season	Club	League	Apps	Goals	Apps	Goals	Apps	Goals	Apps	Goals
Turkey			League		Turkish Cup		Europe		Total	
1995–96	Beşiktaş	Süper Lig^{1}	13	0	2	0	?	?	?	?
1996–97	Beşiktaş	Süper Lig^{1}	16	0	1	0	?	?	?^{2}	?
1997–98	İstanbul BB	1. Lig^{3}	27	1	2	0	—		29	1
1998–99	İstanbul BB	1. Lig^{3}	23	2	2	0	—		25	2
1999–2000	İstanbul BB	1. Lig^{3}	21	1	1	0	—		22	1
2000–01	İstanbul BB	1. Lig^{3}	29	0	1	0	—		30	0
2001–02	İstanbul BB	1. Lig^{4}	34	1	1	0	—		35	1
2002–03	Göztepe	Süper Lig	33	1	2	0	—		35	1
2003–04	Diyarbakırspor	Süper Lig	28	0	1	0	—		29	0
2004–05	Diyarbakırspor	Süper Lig	30	2	1	0	—		31	2
2005–06	Diyarbakırspor	Süper Lig	29	0	3	0	—		32	0
2006–07	Gaziantepspor	Süper Lig	2	0	0	0	—		2	0
2006-07	Samsunspor	1. Lig^{4}	24	0	0	0	—		24	0
2007–08	Samsunspor	1. Lig^{4}	16	0	0	0	—		16	0
2008–09	Körfez Belediyespor	2. Lig	19	0	0	0	—		19	0
2009–10	Körfez Belediyespor	2. Lig	12	0	1	0	—		13	0
Career total			356	8	18	0	?	?	?^{2}	?

^{1}As First League
^{2}Include 1 match at Chancellor Cup
^{3}As Second League with 50 to 51 teams
^{4}As Second League A with 18 to 20 teams
