= Abdel Aziz El-Hammami =

Egyptian footballer

International career
Years	Team	Apps	(Gls)
- Egypt
Medal record
Men's Football
Representing Egypt
Mediterranean Games
Silver medal – second place	1951 Alexandria

Abdel Aziz El-Hammami (died before 2009) was an Egyptian footballer. He competed in the men's tournament at the 1948 Summer Olympics.

== Honours ==
Egypt

- Mediterranean Games: Silver Medal, 1951
