= Football at the 1991 Mediterranean Games =

1991 Mediterranean Games football tournament
Tournament details
- Host country: Greece
- Cities: Athens; Thessaloniki; Larissa; Patras; Heraklion
- Dates: 28 June – 12 July
- Teams: 11
- Venue(s): Athens Olympic Stadium; Kaftanzoglio Stadium; Alcazar Stadium; Pampeloponnisiako Stadium; Pankritio Stadium

Final positions
- Champions: Greece (2nd title)
- Runners-up: Turkey
- Third place: Morocco
- Fourth place: Yugoslavia

Tournament statistics
- Matches played: 14
- Goals scored: 44 (3.14 per match)
- Top scorer: (Greece) Panagiotis Sofianopoulos (7 goals)

The 1991 Mediterranean Games football tournament was the 11th edition of the Mediterranean Games men's football tournament. The football tournament was held in Athens, Greece between 28 June and 12 July 1991 as part of the 1991 Mediterranean Games and was contested by 11 teams and for the first time and since this edition, all countries were represented by the olympic teams. The host team, Greece, won the golden medal.

== Participating teams ==
Eleven olympic teams took part to the tournament, 4 teams from Africa and 7 teams from Europe.

Federation	Nation
CAF Africa	Algeria; Egypt; Morocco; Tunisia
AFC Asia	None
UEFA Europe	Albania; Cyprus; Greece (hosts); Italy; San Marino; Turkey; Yugoslavia

== Venues ==
Cities	Venues	Capacity
Athens	Olympic Stadium	70,000
Larisa	Alcazar Stadium	15,000

== Tournament ==
All times local : CET (UTC+2)

Key to colours in group tables
Group winners advance to the Semi-finals

=== Group stage ===
==== Group A ====
Team	Pld	W	D	L	GF	GA	GD	Pts
Turkey	2	1	0	1	3	2	+1	2
Egypt	2	1	0	1	2	1	0	2
Italy	2	1	0	1	1	2	−1	2

30 June 1991

Egypt	2–1	Turkey
Abo Greisha 56'; Rayyan 86'	Report	Alp (red card) 75'; Şükür 76'

Pampeloponnisiako Stadium, Patras
Attendance: 2,000
Referee: Václav Krondl (Czechoslovakia)

2 July 1991

Turkey	2–0	Italy
Kerimoğlu 59' (pen.), 81' (pen.)	Report

Pampeloponnisiako Stadium, Patras
Referee: Mohamed Mimoun (Algeria)

4 July 1991

Italy	1–0	Egypt
Rizzolo 61'	Report

Pampeloponnisiako Stadium, Patras
Referee: Vassilios Nikakis (Greece)

==== Group B ====
Team	Pld	W	D	L	GF	GA	GD	Pts
Greece	2	2	0	0	8	0	+8	4
Albania	2	1	0	1	2	6	−4	2
Algeria	2	0	0	2	1	5	−4	0

30 June 1991

Albania	2–1	Algeria
Goal		Rahem

Kaftanzoglio Stadium, Thessaloniki

2 July 1991
20:30 EEST

Greece	5–0	Albania
Sofianopoulos 11', 38', 79', 90+3'; Marinakis 77'; Moutas (red card) 87'		Nallbani (red card) 87'

Kaftanzoglio Stadium, Thessaloniki
Referee: Dušan Čolić (Yugoslavia)

4 July 1991
20:30 EEST

Greece	3–0	Algeria
Marinakis 53'; Sofianopoulos 66', 86'

Kaftanzoglio Stadium, Thessaloniki
Referee: Arcangelo Pezzella (Italy)

==== Group C ====
Team	Pld	W	D	L	GF	GA	GD	Pts
Yugoslavia	2	2	0	0	10	0	+10	4
Tunisia	2	1	0	1	1	5	−4	2
San Marino	2	0	0	2	0	6	−6	0

30 June 1991

Tunisia	1–0	San Marino
Goal

Alcazar Stadium, Larissa

2 July 1991

Yugoslavia	5–0	San Marino
Drobnjak 13' (red card) 53'; Šandalić 25'; Novak 59'; Jokanović 65'; Živković 82'		Della Valle (red card) 52'

Alcazar Stadium, Larissa
Referee: Sadık Deda (Turkey)

4 July 1991

Yugoslavia	5–0	Tunisia
Bogdanović 10'; Novak 15'; Jokanović 58'; Vukov 63', 78' (pen.)

Alcazar Stadium, Larissa

==== Group D ====
Team	Pld	W	D	L	GF	GA	GD	Pts
Morocco	1	1	0	0	3	0	+3	2
Cyprus	1	0	0	1	0	3	−3	0

4 July 1991

Cyprus	0–3	Morocco
		Ammouta 7'; Giannakis 20' (o.g.); Bodilan 71'

Pankritio Stadium, Heraklion
Referee: Ibrahim Nasur (Tunisia)

=== Knockout stage ===
Semi-finals
8 July – Athens
Greece (a.e.t.)	2
Yugoslavia	1
8 July – Athens
Turkey	1
Morocco	0

Final
12 July – Athens
Greece	3
Turkey	1
Third place
12 July – Athens
Yugoslavia	2
Morocco	3

==== Semi-finals ====
8 July 1991
21:30 EEST

Greece	2–1 (a.e.t.)	Yugoslavia
Marinakis 12'; Mitsopoulos 109'		Jokanović 53' (pen.)

Karaiskakis Stadium, Athens
Attendance: 30,000
Referee: Václav Krondl (Czech Republic)

8 July 1991

Turkey	1–0	Morocco
Günçar 72'

Karaiskakis Stadium, Athens
Referee: Eero Aho (Finland)

==== Third place match ====
12 July 1991

Yugoslavia	2–3	Morocco
Vukov; Jokanović		Raghib; Rokbi; Rmouj

==== Final ====
12 July 1991
19:30 EEST

Greece	3–1	Turkey
Marinakis 43'; Donis 70'; Sofianopoulos 81'	Report	Korkmaz 58'

Olympic Stadium, Athens
Attendance: 60,000
Referee: Eero Aho (Finland)

== Tournament classification ==
Rank	Team	Pld	W	D	L	GF	GA	GD	Pts
1	Greece	4	4	0	0	13	2	+11	8
2	Turkey	4	2	0	2	5	5	0	4
3	Morocco	3	2	0	1	6	3	+3	4
4	Yugoslavia	4	2	0	2	13	5	+8	4
Eliminated in the group stage
5	Egypt	2	1	0	1	2	1	+1	2
6	Albania	2	1	0	1	2	6	–4	2
7	Tunisia	2	1	0	1	1	5	–4	2
8	Italy	2	1	0	1	1	2	–1	2
9	Algeria	2	0	0	2	1	5	–4	0
10	San Marino	2	0	0	2	0	6	–6	0
11	Cyprus	1	0	0	1	0	3	–3	0
