= Stadio Pino Zaccheria =

Stadium in Foggia, Italy

Coordinates: 41°27′16″N 15°32′33″E

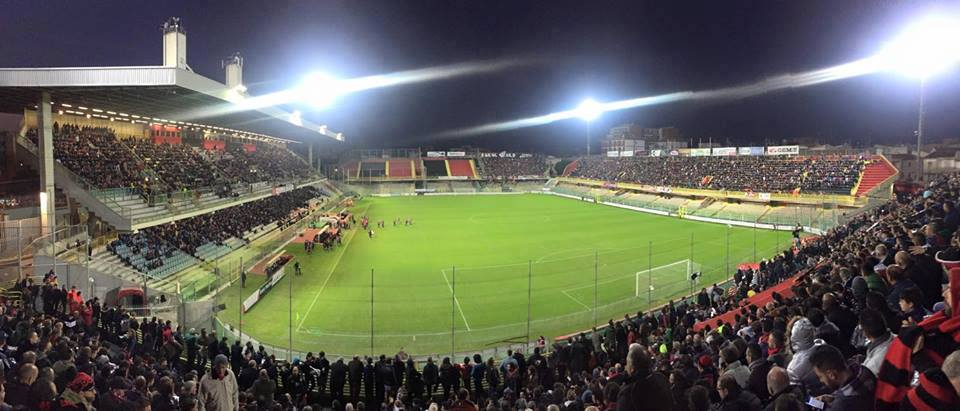
- Interactive map of Stadio Pino Zaccheria
- Location: Foggia, Italy
- Owner: Municipality of Foggia
- Capacity: 25,085
- Surface: Grass

Construction
- Opened: 22 November 1925; 100 years ago

Tenants
- Foggia Calcio; Italy national football team (selected matches)

Stadio Pino Zaccheria is a multi-use stadium in Foggia, Italy, which was inaugurated in 1925. It is currently used mostly for football matches and is the home ground of Foggia Calcio. The stadium holds around 25,000 people.

== History ==
The stadium is named after Pino Zaccheria, a valiant lieutenant and athlete from Foggia, and a pioneer of local basketball, who lost his life during the Greco-Italian War in Tirana on 4 April 1941.

== Notable matches ==
Date	Match	Score	Stage	Attendance
21 December 1991	Italy – Cyprus	2–0	UEFA Euro 1992 qualifying	17,732
16 June 1997	Libya U23 – Slovenia U23	2–2	1997 Mediterranean Games	
16 June 1997	Greece U23 – San Marino U23	4–1	1997 Mediterranean Games	
19 June 1997	Italy U23 – Albania U23	4–0	1997 Mediterranean Games	
20 June 1997	Turkey U23 – Slovenia U23	2–1	1997 Mediterranean Games	
25 June 1997	Spain U23 – Greece U23	0–1	1997 Mediterranean Games	
