= Football at the 1951 Mediterranean Games – Men's team squads =

Below are the squads for the Football at the 1951 Mediterranean Games, hosted by Egypt, and took place between 14 and 18 October 1951.

== Egypt ==
Coach:

No.	Pos.	Player	Date of birth (age)	Caps	Goals	Club
	GK	Ahmed Kato				(Egyptian Football Association) Al Ittihad Alexandria
	DF	Nour El-Dali	24 October 1928 (aged 22)			(Egyptian Football Association) Farouk
	DF	Abdel Aziz Hammami				(Egyptian Football Association) Al Ahly
	DF	Hanafy Bastan	6 December 1923 (aged 27)			(Egyptian Football Association) Farouk
	MF	Mohamed Abou Habaga				(Egyptian Football Association) Farouk
	FW	Mohamed El Guendi				(Egyptian Football Association) Al Ahly
	FW	El-Sayed El-Dhizui	14 September 1926 (aged 25)			(Egyptian Football Association) Al-Masry
	FW	Ahmed Mekkawi				(Egyptian Football Association) Al Ahly
		Hamza Abdel Mawla	26 October 1923 (aged 27)			
		Saad Rached				
		Awad Abdel Rahman				

== Greece ==
Coach: Giannis Helmis

No.	Pos.	Player	Date of birth (age)	Caps	Goals	Club
	GK	Stelios Kourouklatos	1922			(Hellenic Football Federation) Olympiacos
	DF	Ilias Rosidis	3 February 1927 (aged 24)			(Hellenic Football Federation) Olympiacos
	DF	Kostas Linoxilakis	5 March 1933 (aged 18)			(Hellenic Football Federation) Asteras Gyzi
	DF	Andreas Mouratis	29 November 1926 (aged 24)			(Hellenic Football Federation) Olympiacos
	MF	Giannis Ioannou	1931			(Hellenic Football Federation) Ethnikos Piraeus
	MF	Babis Kotridis	30 October 1928 (aged 22)			(Hellenic Football Federation) Olympiacos
	MF	Nikos Raditsas	1931			(Hellenic Football Federation) Asteras Gyzi
	MF	Giorgos Darivas	12 March 1926 (aged 25)			(Hellenic Football Federation) Olympiacos
	FW	Nikos Lekatsas	30 November 1925 (aged 25)			(Hellenic Football Federation) Ethnikos Piraeus
	MF	Thanasis Bebis (c)	1 January 1929 (aged 22)			(Hellenic Football Federation) Olympiacos
	FW	Babis Drosos	1927			(Hellenic Football Federation) Olympiacos

== Syria ==
Coach:

No.	Pos.	Player	Date of birth (age)	Caps	Goals	Club
	GK	Marwan Derderi				(Syrian Football Association) Al-Jaish
		Greiss Marouni				
		Mowaffak Hafez				
		Kevork Kassab				
		Michel Al-Tawil				
		Fetech Enani				
		Hakob Avrian				
		Jabra Al-Zarqa				
		Abdullah Al-Tawil				
		L. Garbi				
		M. Masri				
