= Slobodan Slović =

Serbian footballer

Personal information
- Full name: Slobodan Slović
- Date of birth: 9 February 1975 (age 51)
- Place of birth: Čačak, SR Serbia, SFR Yugoslavia
- Height: 1.79 m (5 ft 10 in)
- Position: Midfielder

Youth career
- Borac Čačak

Senior career*
| Years | Team | Apps | (Gls) |
| 1993–1996 | Borac Čačak | | |
| 1997–1998 | Železnik | 40 | (9) |
| 1998 | Red Star Belgrade | 6 | (0) |
| 1999–2001 | Železnik | 73 | (9) |
| 2001 | Korotan Prevalje | 2 | (0) |
| 2002–2003 | Železnik | 51 | (0) |
| 2004 | Borac Čačak | 8 | (0) |
| 2004–2008 | Cercle Brugge | 70 | (0) |
| 2008 | → Royal Antwerp (loan) | 14 | (1) |
| 2008–2009 | Royal Antwerp | 31 | (2) |
| 2009–2010 | Cappellen | | |
| 2011 | Inđija | 5 | (0) |
| 2011–2012 | Hajduk Beograd | 27 | (2) |
| 2012–2013 | Šumadija Jagnjilo | 21 | (1) |
| 2013 | Sopot | | |
| 2014 | Hajduk Beograd | | |
| Total | | 348 | (24) |

International career
| 1997 | FR Yugoslavia U21 | 1 | (0) |
| 1997 | FR Yugoslavia U23 | 2 | (1) |

Managerial career
- 2012: Hajduk Beograd (player-manager)
- * Club domestic league appearances and goals

Slobodan Slović (Serbian Cyrillic: Слободан Словић; born 9 February 1975) is a Serbian former professional footballer who played as a midfielder.

== Club career ==
Slović started out at his hometown club Borac Čačak, helping them win the Second League of FR Yugoslavia in the 1993–94 season and earn promotion to the First League of FR Yugoslavia. He was transferred to Železnik in the 1997 winter transfer window. After his consistent performances in the 1997–98 season, Slović secured a move to Red Star Belgrade. He, however, failed to make an impact with the team and quickly returned to Železnik. In the summer of 2001, Slović moved abroad to Slovenia and played briefly for Korotan Prevalje, before returning to Železnik once again.

After a brief comeback spell at Borac Čačak, Slović moved abroad for the second time and signed with Belgian First Division side Cercle Brugge in June 2004. He was loaned to Belgian Second Division club Royal Antwerp in January 2008. At the end of the season, Slović terminated his contract with Cercle Brugge and signed with Royal Antwerp on a permanent basis. He signed a contract with Belgian Third Division side Cappellen in August 2009.

In the summer of 2011, Slović joined Serbian League Belgrade side Hajduk Beograd. He served as the club's player-manager in the second half of the 2011–12 season.

== International career ==
In June 1997, Slović was capped once for FR Yugoslavia during the UEFA Under-21 Championship qualifiers. He also competed with the under-23 team at the Mediterranean Games later the same month.

== Honours ==
Borac Čačak

- Second League of FR Yugoslavia: 1993–94
