= Football at the Mediterranean Games =

Association Football at the Mediterranean Games
- Organiser(s): CIJM
- Founded: 1951
- Abolished: 2026
- Region: Mediterranean Sea (FIFA)
- Teams: 8 (from 3 confederations)
- Last champions: ♂ Algeria (2nd title) ♀ Portugal (1st title)
- Most championships: Italy (4 titles)

Football has been played consistently at the Mediterranean Games since 1951 for men and since 2026 for women.

Italy is the most successful team with four titles. From 1991, senior national teams are not allowed, which means only youth teams participate in the tournament.

In 2025, the International Committee of the Mediterranean Games decided, following a proposal from the Libyan Olympic Committee, to replace the football tournament with a futsal tournament from the 2030 Mediterranean Games in Priština, in order to reduce organisational costs.

== Team variants ==
=== Men ===
- 1951: National teams (full A)
- 1955–1987: National amateur teams, Olympic teams, National B teams and National teams (full A)
- 1991–1997: National U23 teams
- 2001: National U21 teams
- 2005: National U23 teams
- 2009: National U20 teams
- 2013: National U19 teams
- 2018–2022: National U18 teams
- 2026–present: National U21 teams

=== Women ===
- 2026–present: National U19 teams

== Men's tournament ==
=== Results ===
Year	Host	Gold medal game			Bronze medal game			Number of teams
Year	Host	Gold medalist	Score	Silver medalist	Bronze medalist	Score	Fourth place	Number of teams
1951; Details	(Egypt); Alexandria	Greece	^{n/a}	Egypt	Syria		No Fourth	3 (squads)
1955; Details	(Spain); Barcelona	Egypt	^{n/a}	Spain	France	^{n/a}	Syria	4 (squads)
1959; Details	(Lebanon); Beirut	Italy	^{n/a}	Turkey	Lebanon		No Fourth	3 (squads)
1963; Details	(Italy); Naples	Italy	3–0	Turkey	Spain	2–1	Morocco	9 (squads)
1967; Details	(Tunisia); Tunis	France; Medal shared with Italy	0–0 (a.e.t.)	No Second	Spain	2–1	Turkey	8 (squads)
1967; Details	(Tunisia); Tunis	Italy; Medal shared with France	0–0 (a.e.t.)	No Second	Spain	2–1	Turkey	8 (squads)
1971; Details	(Turkey); İzmir	Yugoslavia	1–0	Tunisia	Turkey	1–0 (a.e.t.)	Egypt	8 (squads)
1975; Details	(Algeria); Algiers	Algeria	3–2 (a.e.t.)	France	Tunisia	1–1 (4–3 p)	Morocco	9 (squads)
1979; Details	(Socialist Federal Republic of Yugoslavia); Split	Yugoslavia	3–0	France	Algeria	2–1	Greece	8 (squads)
1983; Details	(Morocco); Casablanca	Morocco	3–0	Turkey	Egypt	0–0 (5–2 p)	France	9 (squads)
1987; Details	(Syria); Latakia	Syria	2–1	France	Turkey	1–0 (a.e.t.)	Greece	8 (squads)
1991; Details	(Greece); Athens	Greece	3–1	Turkey	Morocco	3–2	Yugoslavia	11 (squads)
1993; Details	(France); Languedoc-Roussillon	Turkey	2–0	Algeria	France	2–1	Italy	10 (squads)
1997; Details	(Italy); Bari	Italy	5–1	Turkey	Greece	1–0	Spain	13 (squads)
2001; Details	(Tunisia); Tunis	Tunisia	1–0	Italy	France	2–0	Turkey	9 (squads)
2005; Details	(Spain); Almería	Spain	1–0	Turkey	Libya	1–1 (4–3 p)	Morocco	9 (squads)
2009; Details	(Italy); Pescara	Spain	2–1	Italy	Libya	0–0 (8–7 p)	France	12 (squads)
2013; Details	(Turkey); Mersin	Morocco	2–2 (3–2 p)	Turkey	Tunisia	4–0	Libya	8 (squads)
2018; Details	(Spain); Tarragona	Spain	3–2	Italy	Morocco	0–0 (7–6 p)	Greece	9 (squads)
2022; Details	(Algeria); Oran	France	1–0	Italy	Morocco	4–2	Turkey	8 (squads)
2026; Details	(Italy); Taranto	Algeria	2–0	Tunisia	Morocco	4–1	Italy	8 (squads)

^n/a A round-robin tournament determined the final standings.

=== Participating nations ===
Nation	51	55	59	63	67	71	75	79	83	87	91	93	97	01	05	09	13	18	22	26	Years
AFC
Lebanon			3	7						6											3
Syria	3	4		8		7			8	1						9					7
CAF
Algeria	Part of France				6		1	3	6	8	9	2	8	8	6			6	6	1	13
Egypt	2	1		5		4	6	8	3		5										8
Libya	Ita				8		8		9				13	7	3	3	4	9			9
Morocco	Fra			4	7	dq	4	6	1	5	3	9		5	4	w/o	1	3	3	3	15
Tunisia	Fra			6	5	2	3	7	7		7	7		1	7	7	3			2	13
UEFA
Albania											6		11			10	8			6	5
Bosnia and Herzegovina	Part of Yugoslavia											8	6				5	8			4
Croatia	Part of Yugoslavia											10	10								2
Cyprus											11										1
France		3			1	5	2	2	4	2		3	7	3		4		5	1		13
Greece	1					6	9	4	5	4	1	5	3	6	8	5		4	7		14
Italy			1	1	1						8	4	1	2	5	2	7	2	2	4	13
Kosovo	Part of Yugoslavia											Part of Serbia								8	1
North Macedonia	Part of Yugoslavia																6			7	2
Malta				9											9	11					3
Montenegro	Part of Yugoslavia															8					1
Portugal																			5		1
San Marino										7	10		12	9							4
Yugoslavia^{A}						1	5	1			4		5								5
Slovenia	Part of Yugoslavia											6	9								2
Spain		2		3	3								4		1	1		1	8		8
Turkey			2	2	4	3	7	5	2	3	2	1	2	4	2	6	2	7	4	5	18
Total nations (24)	3	4	3	9	8	7	9	8	9	8	11	10	13	9	9	12	8	9	8	8	

^{^A}Includes one appearance as Serbia

== Women's tournament ==
=== Results ===
Year	Host	Gold medal game			Bronze medal game			Number of teams
Year	Host	Gold medalist	Score	Silver medalist	Bronze medalist	Score	Fourth place	Number of teams
2026; Details	(Italy); Taranto	Portugal	4–0	Italy	Morocco	3–1	Slovenia	5 (squads)

=== Participating nations ===
Nation	26	Years
AFC
No team
CAF
Morocco	3	1
UEFA
Italy	2	1
Kosovo	5	1
Portugal	1	1
Slovenia	4	1
Total nations (5)	5	

== Overall medal tables (1951–2026) ==
=== Men ===
Rank	Nation	Gold	Silver	Bronze	Total
1	Italy	4	4	0	8
2	Spain	3	1	2	6
3	France	2	3	3	8
4	Algeria	2	1	1	4
5	Morocco	2	0	4	6
6	Greece	2	0	1	3
7	Yugoslavia	2	0	0	2
8	Turkey	1	7	2	10
9	Tunisia	1	2	2	5
10	Egypt	1	1	1	3
11	Syria	1	0	1	2
12	Libya	0	0	2	2
13	Lebanon	0	0	1	1
Totals (13 entries)		21	19	20	60

=== Women ===
Rank	Nation	Gold	Silver	Bronze	Total
1	Portugal	1	0	0	1
2	Italy	0	1	0	1
3	Morocco	0	0	1	1
Totals (3 entries)		1	1	1	3

=== Combined (men and women) ===
Rank	Nation	Gold	Silver	Bronze	Total
1	Italy	4	5	0	9
2	Spain	3	1	2	6
3	France	2	3	3	8
4	Algeria	2	1	1	4
5	Morocco	2	0	5	7
6	Greece	2	0	1	3
7	Yugoslavia	2	0	0	2
8	Turkey	1	7	2	10
9	Tunisia	1	2	2	5
10	Egypt	1	1	1	3
11	Syria	1	0	1	2
12	Portugal	1	0	0	1
13	Libya	0	0	2	2
14	Lebanon	0	0	1	1
Totals (14 entries)		22	20	21	63

== Summary ==
=== Men (1951–1987) ===
As end of 1987 Mediterranean Games. 10 editions compete between Senior teams but many teams not compete national A teams. All matches not between two A Senior team are not counted as A-level match by FIFA.

Rank	Team	Part	M	W	D	L	GF	GA	GD	Points
1	France	7	32	16	8	8	44	27	+17	56
2	Turkey	8	32	15	7	10	41	33	+8	52
3	Italy	3	13	10	2	1	32	6	+26	32
4	Algeria	5	19	10	2	7	29	25	+4	32
5	Morocco	7	22	8	8	6	23	21	+2	32
6	Egypt	7	24	8	7	9	42	33	+9	31
7	Yugoslavia	3	12	9	2	1	32	9	+23	29
8	Spain	3	13	7	5	1	28	12	+16	26
9	Tunisia	6	20	6	6	8	21	23	–2	24
10	Greece	6	21	6	4	11	24	38	–14	22
11	Syria	6	18	4	1	13	15	41	–26	13
12	Lebanon	3	11	1	1	9	4	26	–22	4
13	Libya	3	9	1	1	7	7	18	–11	4
14	San Marino	1	3	0	1	2	0	7	–7	1
15	Malta	1	4	0	0	4	4	18	–14	0

=== Men (1951–2022) ===
Rank	Team	Part	M	W	D	L	GF	GA	GD	Points
1	Turkey	17	72	35	13	24	99	78	+21	118
2	France	13	55	29	12	14	80	51	+29	99
3	Italy	12	47	30	7	10	96	34	+62	97
4	Spain	8	34	19	10	5	63	32	+31	67
5	Greece	14	46	19	6	21	64	66	–2	63
6	Morocco	14	44	15	15	14	63	49	+1	60
7	Tunisia	12	40	15	12	13	50	47	+3	57
8	Algeria	12	39	14	8	17	52	60	–8	50
9	Yugoslavia	5	19	13	3	3	49	15	+34	42
10	Egypt	8	27	9	7	11	44	36	+8	34
11	Libya	9	31	3	11	17	22	56	–34	20
12	Syria	7	20	4	2	14	16	46	–30	14
13	Bosnia and Herzegovina	4	11	2	3	6	14	24	–10	9
14	Albania	4	10	1	1	8	8	27	–19	4
15	Lebanon	3	11	1	1	9	4	26	–22	4
16	Portugal	1	3	1	0	2	2	3	–1	3
17	Slovenia	2	5	0	3	2	5	7	–2	3
18	Montenegro	1	2	0	2	0	0	0	0	2
19	Croatia	2	5	0	1	4	6	11	–5	1
20	North Macedonia	1	4	0	1	3	5	13	–8	1
21	San Marino	4	9	0	1	8	1	32	–31	1
22	Cyprus	1	1	0	0	1	0	3	–3	0
23	Malta	3	8	0	0	8	4	31	–27	0

== See also ==
- Mediterranean Cup (men's football)
- Football at the African Games
- Football at the Asian Games
