= Muharrem Karriqi =

Albanian footballer

Muharrem Karriqi (born in Kavajë) is a retired Albanian footballer who played most of his professional career as playmaker for Besa Kavajë football club during the 1970s. He is widely considered as the most talented midfielder in club history.

He won a league title with Partizani.

== Honours ==
- Albanian Superliga: 1

1979
