= Dražen Madunović =

Croatian footballer

Personal information
- Date of birth: 17 March 1971 (age 55)
- Place of birth: SR Croatia, SFR Yugoslavia
- Position: Defender

Senior career*
Years	Team	Apps	(Gls)
1992	Varteks	20	(1)
1993	Croatia Zagreb	4	(0)
1993–2001	Varteks	213	(8)
2001–2003	Hapoel Be'er Sheva	58	(2)
Total		295	(11)

Managerial career
- 2012: NK Zagreb
- 2013-2014: Croatia U-19
- 2015-2020: NK Zagreb
- * Club domestic league appearances and goals

Dražen Madunović (born 17 March 1971) is a retired Croatian football defender.

== Managerial career ==
He took charge at NK Zagreb in November 2011, succeeding Luka Bonačić who had replaced Dražen Besek himself earlier in the season.
