= Danijel Štefulj =

Croatian footballer (born 1973)

Personal information
- Date of birth: 2 June 1973 (age 53)
- Place of birth: Čakovec, Croatia, Yugoslavia
- Height: 1.80 m (5 ft 11 in)
- Positions: Defender; midfielder

Senior career*
Years	Team	Apps	(Gls)
1992–1995	Varteks	70	(4)
1996–1999	Croatia Zagreb	37	(3)
1998	→ Slaven Belupo (loan)	11	(1)
1999–2005	Hannover 96	130	(15)
2004	→ Nürnberg (loan)	16	(2)
2005–2006	Paderborn	1	(0)
2006	Rot-Weiss Essen	10	(0)
2007–2008	Međimurje	21	(2)
2008–2011	Deutsch Kaltenbrunn	86	(9)
2011–2014	SC Wiesen	78	(14)

International career
1993–1996	Croatia U21	4	(0)
1996	Croatia	2	(0)
- * Club domestic league appearances and goals

Danijel Štefulj (born 2 June 1973) is a retired Croatian footballer who played as a defender or midfielder.

During his 16-year-long professional career, Štefulj played for several clubs in Croatia and Germany, most notably Croatia Zagreb (now Dinamo Zagreb) and Hannover 96.

== Club career ==
Born in Čakovec, Štefulj started his professional career with NK Varteks in 1992, before transferring to Croatia Zagreb in the winter break of the 1995–96 season. During the 1997–98 season, he also spent a few months on loan to NK Slaven Belupo. In 1999, he moved to German side Hannover 96, who played in the 2. Bundesliga at the time. He established himself as a regular at the club, appearing in a total of 95 league matches over the following three seasons and helping the club gain promotion to the Bundesliga in 2002. He scored a total of 14 league goals during the three seasons.

During the 2002–03 season, he appeared in a total of 22 Bundesliga matches for Hannover, scoring his only goal of the season in a 4–2 win against 1. FC Nürnberg in February 2003. The following season, he made 9 more Bundesliga appearances for Hannover before being loaned to Nuremberg in February 2004, making 16 appearances for the club in the 2nd Bundesliga until the end of the season and scoring two goals for the club in a 4–3 win at VfL Osnabrück in May 2004. He also helped Nuremberg return to the top flight for the 2004–05 season.

He then returned to Hannover following the end of the 2003–04 season, but only made 4 Bundesliga appearances for the club throughout the entire 2004–05 Bundesliga season. In the summer of 2005, he moved to SC Paderborn 07, where he only made one appearance in the 2nd Bundesliga before moving to Rot-Weiss Essen in the winter break of the 2005–06 season and making 10 appearances for the club in the Regionalliga Nord. He also helped Essen gain promotion to the 2. Bundesliga for the 2006–07 season, but made no appearances in the league before leaving for NK Međimurje in January 2007. He finished his senior career with Međimurje during the 2007–08 season, but had a few years at Austrian fifth and sixth tier sides.

== International career ==
Štefulj made four international appearances for the Croatian national under-21 football team between 1993 and 1996, all in international friendlies. He also won two full international caps for Croatia in their friendly matches against Poland and Hungary in 1996.

== Personal life ==
He has a son named Daniel, which is pronounced the same, but with different spelling. Daniel is also a footballer and has played for Varaždin, a club unassociated with the club Štefulj played for, NK Varteks, which had changed name to NK Varaždin in 2010, then folded in 2015.
