= Stade Louis-Michel =

Stadium in Sète, France

- Interactive map of Stade Louis-Michel
- Location: Sète, Occitanie, France
- Coordinates: 43°24′45″N 3°40′14″E
- Capacity: 8,500
- Surface: Grass

Construction
- Opened: 1990
- Renovated: 2005

Tenants
- SC Sète

Stade Louis-Michel (French pronunciation: [stad lwi miʃɛl]) is a multi-purpose stadium in Sète, France. It is currently used mostly for football matches and is the home stadium of SC Sète. The stadium is able to hold 8,500 people.
