= Robert Marušič =

Slovenian footballer

Personal information
- Date of birth: 10 August 1973 (age 53)
- Height: 1.84 m (6 ft 0 in)
- Position: Defender

Senior career*
Years	Team	Apps	(Gls)
1992–1995	Živila Naklo	66	(28)
1996–1998	Gorica	62	(15)
1998–1999	Primorje	30	(6)
1999–2000	Maccabi Herzliya	35	(2)
2001–2002	Triglav Kranj	5	(0)
2003-2004	Viktoria Plzeň		
2004–2005	Šenčur	8	(7)

Managerial career
- 2017: Triglav Kranj
- 2018: Triglav Kranj
- * Club domestic league appearances and goals

Robert Marušič (born 10 August 1973) is a Slovenian retired football defender.
