= Vladimir Vasilj =

Footballer (born 1975)

Personal information
- Date of birth: 6 July 1975 (age 51)
- Place of birth: Hanover, West Germany
- Height: 1.88 m (6 ft 2 in)
- Position: Goalkeeper

Youth career
- 199?–1995: Mladost Dubint

Senior career*
Years	Team	Apps	(Gls)
1995–1998	Hrvatski Dragovoljac	63	(0)
1998–2001	Dinamo Zagreb	5	(0)
2001–2003	NK Zagreb	57	(0)
2004	Varteks	30	(0)
2004–2005	Dinamo Zagreb	20	(0)
2005	Konyaspor	2	(0)
2006–2009	Široki Brijeg	61	(0)
Total		238	(0)

International career
1996–1997	Croatia U21	7	(0)
1998–2004	Croatia	2	(0)

Managerial career
- 2011–2013: Brotnjo (sports director)
Medal record
Competitor for Croatia
Bronze medal – third place	FIFA World Cup	1998
- * Club domestic league appearances and goals

Vladimir Vasilj (born 6 July 1975) is a Croatian former professional footballer who played as a goalkeeper. Born in Germany, he made two appearances for the Croatia national team.

== Career ==
Born in Hanover, West Germany, Vasilj started his professional career at Croatian club Hrvatski Dragovoljac in the 1995–96 season. He continued to play for the club in the following three seasons, being their first-choice goalkeeper in two of the three seasons.

In the spring of 1998, he became the Croatia national team's third-choice goalkeeper and was also named to the final 22-man squad for the 1998 World Cup finals in France, but did not play any matches at the tournament where Croatia finished third. Prior to the World Cup, he made his international debut by appearing as a substitute goalkeeper in the second half of Croatia's friendly match against Slovakia played on 29 May 1998 in Pula.

He left Hrvatski Dragovoljac for Dinamo Zagreb in the summer of 1998, but was merely the club's third-choice goalkeeper and managed to make only two domestic league appearances in the following two seasons. He became the club's second-choice goalkeeper after Dražen Ladić's retirement in May 2000 and made three domestic league appearances in the 2000–01 season before transferring to Dinamo's local rivals NK Zagreb for the 2001–02 season. He played for the club in the following two seasons and was their first-choice goalkeeper in both of them, also playing a significant role in the Zagreb team that surprisingly won the Croatian First League champions title in 2002.

In the spring of 2002, he returned to the Croatia national team as their third-choice goalkeeper and was also named to the final 23-man squad for the 2002 World Cup finals in South Korea and Japan, but once again did not manage to play any matches at the tournament. Prior to the World Cup, he won his second international cap in a friendly match against Hungary. He subsequently did not win any international caps, but was called up to be the Croatia national team's third-choice goalkeeper at the Euro 2004 finals in Portugal after the team's first-choice goalkeeper Stipe Pletikosa was forced to withdraw from the tournament due to an injury.

At club level, Vasilj left Zagreb for NK Varteks in the summer of 2003 and spent one season at the club as their first-choice goalkeeper, making 30 domestic league appearances as well as appearing in both of the club's two matches in the first round of the UEFA Cup, where they were eliminated by Hungarian club Debreceni VSC. He returned to Dinamo Zagreb in the summer of 2004 and spent one season at the club as their first-choice goalkeeper, making a total of 20 domestic league appearances and also appearing in all of the club's six UEFA Cup matches that season.

He left Dinamo in the summer of 2005 and joined Turkish club Konyaspor, where he spent the first part of the 2005–06 season as the second-choice goalkeeper, making only two appearances in the Süper Lig, and he subsequently went on to leave Konyaspor for NK Široki Brijeg from Bosnia and Herzegovina at the beginning of 2006, signing an 18-month contract until June 2007. He was released by the club and then retired in July 2009.

== Personal life ==
Vladimir is the father of Bosnian footballer Nikola Vasilj.

== Honours ==
Dinamo Zagreb

- Croatian First League: 1998–99, 1999–00

NK Zagreb

- Croatian First League: 2001–02

Široki Brijeg

- Bosnian Premier League: 2005–06
- Bosnian Cup: 2007

Croatia

- FIFA World Cup Third place: 1998
