= Football at the 1997 Mediterranean Games =

1997 Mediterranean Games football tournament
Tournament details
- Host country: Italy
- City: Bari
- Dates: 16–25 June
- Teams: 13

Final positions
- Champions: Italy (4th title)
- Runners-up: Turkey
- Third place: Greece
- Fourth place: Spain

Tournament statistics
- Matches played: 19
- Goals scored: 50 (2.63 per match)
- Top scorer: (Greece) Nikos Liberopoulos (5 goals)

The 1997 Mediterranean Games football tournament was the 13th edition of the Mediterranean Games men's football tournament. The football tournament was held in Bari, Italy between 16 and 25 June 1997 as part of the 1997 Mediterranean Games and was contested by 13 teams, all countries were represented by the Olympic teams. Italy won the gold medal.

== Participating teams ==
Thirteen teams for U-23 took part in the tournament, 2 teams from Africa and 11 teams from Europe.

Federation	Nation
CAF Africa	Algeria; Libya
AFC Asia	None
UEFA Europe	Albania; Bosnia and Herzegovina; Croatia; France; Greece; Italy (hosts); San Marino; Spain; Slovenia; Turkey (holders); FR Yugoslavia

== System ==
The 13 teams will be divided into four groups of three teams and one group of four teams. Teams are awarded three points for a win and one for a draw. No points are awarded for a defeat. The top sides in each group will advance to the semi-finals.

== Venues ==
7 stadiums were allocated to host the matches.

Stadium	City	Capacity
Stadio San Nicola	Bari	58,270
Stadio Degli Ulivi	Andria	9,140
Stadio Comunale	Barletta	9,200
Stadio Franco Fanuzzi	Brindisi	6,200
Stadio Pino Zaccheria	Foggia	25,085
Stadio Via del Mare	Lecce	33,876
Stadio Erasmo Iacovone	Taranto	30,450

== Tournament ==
All times local : CET (UTC+1)

Key to colours in group tables
Group winners advance to the Semi-finals

=== Group stage ===
==== Group A ====
Team	Pld	W	D	L	GF	GA	GD	Pts
Turkey	3	2	1	0	5	3	+2	7
Algeria	3	0	3	0	4	4	0	3
Slovenia	3	0	2	1	4	5	−1	2
Libya	3	0	2	1	3	4	−1	2

16 June 1997

Turkey	2–2	Algeria
Güner 6', 21'	Report	Ghoul 50' (pen.); El Aouni 56'

Stadio Degli Ulivi, Andria, Italy
Referee: Celino Gracia Redondo (Spain)
16 June 1997

Libya	2–2	Slovenia
83'		Goal

Stadio Pino Zaccheria, Foggia, Italy

18 June 1997

Turkey	1–0	Libya
Özkan 22'	Report

Stadio Via del Mare, Lecce, Italy
Referee: Salem Prolić (Bosnia and Herzegovina)
18 June 1997

Algeria	1–1	Slovenia
Bounekdja 84'		Osterc 48' (pen.)

Stadio Degli Ulivi, Andria, Italy
Referee: Georgios Psychomanis (Greece)

20 June 1997

Turkey	2–1	Slovenia
Bulajič 22' (o.g.); Özat 38'; Özkan (red card) 42'	Report	Osterc 65'

Stadio Pino Zaccheria, Foggia, Italy
Attendance: 2,000
Referee: Zoran Arsić (FR Yugoslavia)
20 June 1997

Algeria	1–1	Libya
Merakchi		Muhammad

Stadio Comunale, Barletta, Italy
Referee: Marco Turo (San Marino)

==== Group B ====
Team	Pld	W	D	L	GF	GA	GD	Pts
Italy	2	1	1	0	4	0	+4	4
FR Yugoslavia	2	1	1	0	3	1	+2	4
Albania	2	0	0	2	1	7	−6	0

17 June 1997

FR Yugoslavia	3–1	Albania
Slović 43'; Tomić 45+3' (pen.); Jestrović 80'		Bogdani 60'

Stadio Comunale, Barletta, Italy
Referee: S. Tivolo (Slovenia)

19 June 1997

Italy	4–0	Albania
Ventola 13'; Baronio 60'; Iannuzzi 67'; Fiore 69'

Stadio Pino Zaccheria, Foggia, Italy
Attendance: 7,000
Referee: Sabri Çelik (Turkey)

21 June 1997

Italy	0–0	FR Yugoslavia

Stadio Degli Ulivi, Andria, Italy
Referee: Eric Romain (Belgium)

==== Group C ====
Team	Pld	W	D	L	GF	GA	GD	Pts
Greece	2	2	0	0	7	1	+6	6
France	2	1	0	1	4	3	+1	3
San Marino	2	0	0	2	1	8	−7	0

16 June 1997

Greece	4–1	San Marino
Lakis 7'; Liberopoulos 16', 50'; Kiassos 58'		Selva 90+1'

Stadio Pino Zaccheria, Foggia, Italy

18 June 1997

France	4–0	San Marino
Diawara 17'; Zanotti 35', 52'; Grenet 70'

Stadio Via del Mare, Lecce, Italy
Referee: Boucif Lazoun (Algeria)

20 June 1997

Greece	3–0	France
Liberopoulos 16', 40' (pen.); Konstantinidis 23'

Stadio Franco Fanuzzi, Brindisi, Italy
Referee: Graziano Cesari (Italy)

==== Group D ====
Team	Pld	W	D	L	GF	GA	GD	Pts
Spain	2	1	1	0	2	1	+1	4
Bosnia and Herzegovina	2	1	1	0	1	0	+1	4
Croatia	2	0	0	2	1	3	−2	0

17 June 1997

Bosnia and Herzegovina	1–0	Croatia
Topić

Stadio Franco Fanuzzi, Brindisi, Italy
Referee: Graziano Cesari (Italy)

19 June 1997

Spain	0–0	Bosnia and Herzegovina

Stadio Erasmo Iacovone, Taranto, Italy
Referee: Lucien Bouchardeau (Niger)

21 June 1997

Spain	2–1	Croatia
Ballesteros 6', 57'	Report	Bazina 18'

Stadio Via del Mare, Lecce, Italy
Attendance: 100
Referee: Pascal Garibian (France)

=== Knockout stage ===
Semifinals
23 June – Lecce
Italy	2
Spain	0
23 June – Taranto
Greece	0
Turkey (a.e.t.)	1

Final
25 June – Bari
Italy	5
Turkey	1
Third place
25 June – Foggia
Spain	0
Greece	1

==== Semi-finals ====
23 June 1997

Italy	2–0	Spain
Ventola 67'; Longo 90+3'

Stadio Via del Mare, Lecce, Italy
Attendance: 3,500
Referee: Pascal Garibian (France)

23 June 1997

Greece	0–1 (a.e.t.)	Turkey
Koulakiotis (red card) 87'	Report	Gümüşdere 98'

Stadio Erasmo Iacovone, Taranto, Italy
Referee: Lucien Bouchardeau (Niger)

==== Third place match ====
25 June 1997

Spain	0–1	Greece
		Liberopoulos 85'

Stadio Pino Zaccheria, Foggia, Italy
Attendance: 2,000
Referee: Marco Tura (San Marino)

==== Final ====
25 June 1997
17:30

Italy	5–1	Turkey
Totti 28', 43' (pen.); Ventola 30', 51'; Longo 65'	Report	Güner 16'; Aykut (red card) 69'

Stadio San Nicola, Bari
Attendance: 20,000
Referee: Zoran Arsić (FR Yugoslavia)

== Final standings ==
Pos	Team	Pld	W	D	L	GF	GA	GD	Pts	Final result
1st place, gold medalist(s)	Italy (H)	4	3	1	0	11	1	+10	10	Gold Medal
2nd place, silver medalist(s)	Turkey	5	3	1	1	7	8	−1	10	Silver Medal
3rd place, bronze medalist(s)	Greece	4	3	0	1	8	2	+6	9	Bronze Medal
4	Spain	4	1	1	2	2	4	−2	4	Fourth place
5	FR Yugoslavia	2	1	1	0	3	1	+2	4	Eliminated in group stage
6	Bosnia and Herzegovina	2	1	1	0	1	0	+1	4	Eliminated in group stage
7	France	2	1	0	1	4	3	+1	3	Eliminated in group stage
8	Algeria	3	0	3	0	4	4	0	3	Eliminated in group stage
9	Slovenia	3	0	2	1	4	5	−1	2	Eliminated in group stage
10	Croatia	2	0	0	2	1	3	−2	0	Eliminated in group stage
11	Albania	2	0	0	2	1	7	−6	0	Eliminated in group stage
12	San Marino	2	0	0	2	1	8	−7	0	Eliminated in group stage
13	Libya	5	0	2	3	3	4	−1	2	Eliminated in group stage

(H) Hosts
