= Stade Pierre Pibarot =

Stadium in Alès, France

- Interactive map of Stade Pierre Pibarot
- Location: Alès, France
- Coordinates: 44.1189°N 4.09°E
- Capacity: 12,000
- Surface: Grass

Tenant
- Olympique Alès

Stade Pierre Pibarot is a stadium in Alès, France. It is currently used for football matches and is the home stadium of Olympique Alès. The stadium holds 12,000 spectators. It is named after Pierre Pibarot.
