= Željko Pavlović =

Croatian footballer

Personal information
- Date of birth: 2 March 1971 (age 55)
- Place of birth: Sarajevo, SFR Yugoslavia
- Height: 1.88 m (6 ft 2 in)
- Position: Goalkeeper

Senior career*
Years	Team	Apps	(Gls)
1989–1992	Željezničar	7	(0)
1992–1994	Croatia Zagreb	3	(0)
1994–1996	NK Zagreb	58	(0)
1996–1997	FC Linz	35	(0)
1997–2001	LASK	105	(0)
2001–2003	Anderlecht	0	(0)
2003–2004	Austria Salzburg		
2004	FC Kärnten	13	(0)
2004–2008	Wacker Innsbruck	107	(0)
2009	Hrvatski Dragovoljac	0	(0)
Total		328	(0)

International career
1996–2001	Croatia	7	(0)
- * Club domestic league appearances and goals

Željko Pavlović (born 2 March 1971) is a retired Croatian football goalkeeper.

== Club career ==
Pavlović started his professional career in 1989 at the club FK Željezničar from Bosnia and Herzegovina and transferred after three seasons to Croatian club Dinamo Zagreb, where he spent one season as understudy to Dražen Ladić and made three domestic league appearances before leaving the club for their city rivals NK Zagreb in the summer of 1994. He spent two seasons with Zagreb as the club's first-choice goalkeeper and then he moved abroad by signing with Austrian club FC Linz for the 1996–97 season. He subsequently continued to play for LASK Linz after FC Linz merged with the club in the summer of 1997.

At club level, Pavlović played for LASK Linz until the end of the 2000–01 season and then he left the club for RSC Anderlecht from Belgium. However, he never managed to establish himself as the first-choice goalkeeper in the Anderlecht team in both of the two seasons he spent there and returned to Austria by signing with Wüstenrot Salzburg in July 2003. He spent only one half-season with Salzburg and went on to play for FC Kärnten until the end of the 2003–04 season. In July 2004, Pavlović signed with Wacker Tirol and has been the club's first-choice goalkeeper ever since, making a total of 57 Bundesliga appearances until the end of the 2005–06 season.

== International career ==
Pavlović made his debut for the Croatia national team playing as the team's substitute goalkeeper in the second half of their friendly match against Israel on 26 March 1996 in Varaždin. He subsequently had to wait for more than three years to win his second international cap for the team, playing all 90 minutes in a friendly match against France on 13 November 1999 at the Stade de France. In 2000, he made three appearances for Croatia in international friendlies before he went on to play the only competitive international match in his career, playing all 90 minutes against Scotland in the Croatia national team's second qualifying match for the 2002 World Cup on 11 October 2000 in Zagreb. He made his last appearance for the Croatia national team in their friendly match against Greece on 25 April 2001 in Varaždin. Pavlović won a total of seven international caps for Croatia.
