= Aydın Dağdelen =

Turkish footballer

Personal information
- Date of birth: 15 April 1971 (age 55)
- Place of birth: İzmir, Turkey
- Position: Goalkeeper

Senior career*
Years	Team	Apps	(Gls)
1990–1991	Altay		
1991–1992	Soma Linyitspor		
1992–2002	Altay		
1999–2000	→ Diyarbakırspor (loan)		
- * Club domestic league appearances and goals

Aydın Dağdelen (born 15 April 1971) is a Turkish retired football goalkeeper.
