= Italy national under-23 football team =

Italy's national under-23 football team

Italy Under-23
- Nickname(s): Gli Azzurrini (The Little Blues)
- Association: Italian Football Federation (Federazion Italia Giuoco Calcio – FIGC)
- Confederation: UEFA (Europe)
- Top scorer: Nicola Ventola (4)
- FIFA code: ITA
First colours	Second colours

First international
- England 1–0 Italy (Nottingham, England; 20 December 1967)

Biggest win
- Italy 4–0 Albania (Foggia, Italy; 19 June 1997); Italy 5–1 Turkey (Bari, Italy; 25 June 1997)

Biggest defeat
- Sweden 4–1 Italy (Växjö, Sweden; 10 October 1971)

Olympic Games
- Appearances: 5 (first in 1992)
- Best result: Bronze medallist: (2004)

Mediterranean Games
- Appearances: 6 (first in 1997)
- Best result: Gold medalist: (1997)

The Italy national under-23 football team (Italian: Nazionale Under-23 di calcio dell'Italia) represented Italy in international under-23 football competitions. Managed by the Italian Football Federation, it ceased to exist after the suppression of the UEFA European Under-23 Championship in 1977; its heir is the Olympic team, which has the same age criteria as the former under-23s.

The under-23's best result in UEFA competitions was reaching the quarter-finals of the 1974 UEFA European Under-23 Championship. An impromptu U-23 team was formed in 1997, twenty years after their most recent appearance; they won the football tournament of the 1997 Mediterranean Games. As of 2022, an Italy U-23 team has not played ever since.

== History ==
The forerunner of the under-23 national team was the "youth" national team (Italian: nazionale "giovanile"), which debuted on 6 April 1942, in Turin, against Hungary. In this encounter, both teams were made up of players born no earlier than 1920, making them de facto under-23 teams. After World War II, the national team – also known as the "cadetti" (cadets), "giovani" (youth) or "primavera" (spring) – played regular matches at least until 1960, based on selections of players under the age of 23.

The under-23 team was officially established in 1967, by a resolution of the FIGC Federal Council: with this act, the FIGC established that, from the 1967–68 season, the new selection would replace the national B team. The new team made their debut on 20 December 1967, in a 1–0 defeat against England played at City Ground in Nottingham. The FIGC hired Romolo Alzani as team coach. On 26 March 1969, the team won their first match, a 2–1 win against Northern Ireland. Coached by Ferruccio Valcareggi, between 1969 and 1970, they played at the Latin Cup, their first tournament in their history, in which they won their only game against Spain in February 1970.

== Honours ==
- Mediterranean Games: 1997

== Olympics football Record ==
Since 1992 Olympic football changed to a U-23 event, and the European U-21 teams are technically U-23 teams. European national teams qualify for the Olympic football tournament through the UEFA European U-21 Championship.

- Before 1992: See Italy national football team
- 1992: Quarter-Finals
- 1996: Group Stage
- 2000: Quarter-Finals
- 2004: Bronze Medal
- 2008: Quarter-Finals
- 2012: Did not qualify
- 2016: Did not qualify
- 2020: Did not qualify
- 2024: Did not qualify

=== Overage players in Olympic Games ===
Tournament	Player 1	Player 2	Player 3
1996	Gianluca Pagliuca (GK)	Massimo Crippa (MF)	Marco Branca (FW)
2004	Matteo Ferrari (DF)	Andrea Pirlo (MF)	did not select
2008	Tommaso Rocchi (FW)	did not select	

== See also ==
- Italy national football team
- Italy national under-21 football team
- Football in Italy
