= Vittore Martini =

Italian footballer and manager (1912–1993)

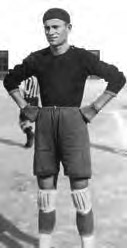

Personal information
- Date of birth: 22 April 1912
- Place of birth: Rho, Italy
- Date of death: 17 January 1993 (aged 80)
- Place of death: Milan, Italy
- Height: 1.78 m (5 ft 10 in)
- Position: Goalkeeper

Senior career*
Years	Team	Apps	(Gls)
1931–1932	Ternana	1	(0)
1932–1933	Juventus Trapani	2	(0)
1933–1936	Catanzaro	44	(0)
1936–1939	AC Milan	3	(0)
1939–1940	Ternana	12	(0)
1940–1941	Savona	20	(2)
1941–1942	Liguria	15	(0)
1943–1944	Legnano	12	(0)
1946–1947	Marsala		
Total		109	(2)

Managerial career
- 1949–1950: Belenenses
- 1955–1956: Vitória Setúbal
- 1957–1958: Greece
- 1958: AEK Athens
- 1959: Vigevano
- 1965: Chiasso
- * Club domestic league appearances and goals

Vittore "Rino" Martini (22 April 1912 – 17 January 1993) was an Italian footballer who played as a goalkeeper and a later manager.

== Club career ==
Martini began his football career in 1931 at Ternana, playing as a goalkeeper. In 1932, he was transferred to Juventus Trapani for one season and then he played at U.S. Catanzaro 1929 for three years, where he won the only title of his career, the Serie C1 in 1936. Then he made the big step of his career, joining the hometown club, Milan, which was also the peak moment in his career. At Milan, he played for three seasons as a back-up goalkeeper, before returning to the club where he first played, Ternana, for one season. Afterwards, he spent another season at Savona. He was distinguished by his power, with a characteristic in his career that he scored with direct volleys. Even today, he holds the goalscoring record for a Serie B goalkeeper, after he scored twice against Siena, the first with a penalty and the second with a direct volley. In 1941, he moved to Liguria, where he played for a season. In total, he made 18 appearances as a starter in Serie A, during difficult times for Italy and football, as the World War II raged and the leagues certainly took a back seat. In 1943, he played Legnano for a year and took a break before returning to football in 1946 for a season with Marsala, where he ended his playing career in 1956.

== Managerial career ==
A year and a half after his retirement as a footballer, Martini became the manager of Belenenses, replacing Alejandro Scopelli. In Lisbon he actually began his managerial career, and as a practitioner of the Italian school of football, he emphasized on defence, losing the Lisbon Championship and finishing third in the Taça de Portugal. He departed from the club in 1950.

The next stop in his career was Vitória Setúbal in 1955, where he finished third in the Taça Ribeiro dos Reis and afterwards came the call from Greece. The HFF, recognizing his ability to fix the defensive line, entrusted him with the Greece national team, where, however, he did not manage to achieve similar results. The heavy defeat 7–1 on 1 October 1958 for the qualifiers of the 1960 European Nations' Cup in Paris by the organizer France of Kopa, Fontaine and Wisniewski, who tore apart the Greek defense and 9 days later, under the weight of the outcry, Martini was fired. He ended his spell in Greece with 2 wins, a draw and 4 defeats in 7 games with 8–17 goals.

On 5 August 1958 the president of AEK Athens, Nikos Goumas, after their unsuccessful previous season, was determined to give his team back their competitive identity that allowed them to star and called the Italian manager who was famous apart from his good defensive game and for his discipline. Martini led the team to the Athens FCA Championship, but after 3 wins in 9 matches he was removed on November and replaced by Kostas Negrepontis.

In 1959, he had a brief spell at Chiasso. The beginning of the 60's found him wandering and for three and a half seasons unemployed, until he was called to the Italian-Swiss border by the Swiss second division Chiasso to replace the technical duo of Carlo Rigotti and Tullio Grassi. This was his last professional involvement in football before he retired from football.

== Personal life ==
After his retirement from football, Martini became a businessman in Lombardy. He died on 17 January 1993.

== Honours ==
=== As a player ===
U.S. Catanzaro 1929

- Serie C1: 1935–36 (Girone D)
