= Georgios Helakis =

Greek sports journalist

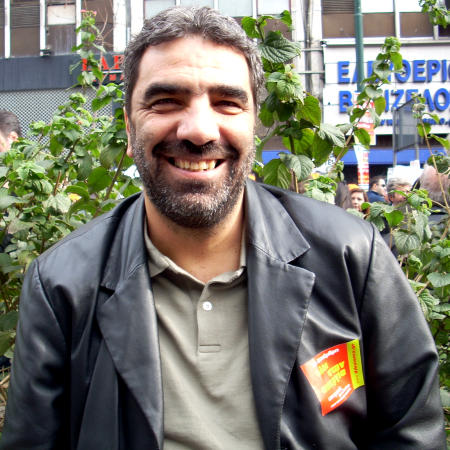
- Helakis at a protest march against the privatization of Pension System in Athens.
- Born: July 11, 1964 (age 61); Seliana, Aigialeia, Greece
- Occupation: Sports commentator
- Employer: Sport FM
- Known for: Live radio broadcasting of international football matches of Greece national football team

Georgios (George) Helakis (Greek: Γεώργιος Χελάκης) is a Greek sports journalist, famous for his passionate live radio broadcasting of international football matches, particularly Champions League and 2004 UEFA European Championship. During Euro 2004 opening match he compared the Greece national football team to a pirate ship, a name which has become the official nickname of the squad since Greece won the tournament.

== Biography ==
Born in the village Seliana in Aigialeia in 1964, Helakis is co-owner and commentator for numerous sports media outlets, including SportDay (Greece's best selling sports daily) and SportFM (Greece's most popular sports radio station). For a short period in the late 2000s, he had also been chairman of Panegialios FC, the semi-professional club of his home town.

Beyond his media-related activities, Helakis is well known as a left-wing activist. The influence of his political ideas is obvious when commenting on matches, citing examples from history and politics and reminding listeners and readers that football must not be used to express national superiority or nationalistic ideas. In the 1980s he was a member of the Communist Party of Greece, but after the party split in 1991, he joined the Coalition of the Left (Synaspismos). In the party's 2004 national congress he was elected in the Central Committee of the party, and in the 2007 legislative election he was a candidate for the Coalition of the Radical Left in the Athens B constituency. He was also candidate for the mayoralty in Kallithea in the 2006 local elections, his platform taking 12 percent of the vote.
