= Greece national football team =

Men's association football team

Greece
- Nickname(s): Εθνική (Ethniki; The National); Γαλανόλευκη (Galanolefki; The Azure & White); Πειρατικό (Piratiko; The Pirate Ship)
- Association: Hellenic Football Federation (HFF) (Ελληνική Ποδοσφαιρική Ομοσπονδία – ΕΠΟ)
- Confederation: UEFA (Europe)
- Head coach: Ivan Jovanović
- Captain: Anastasios Bakasetas
- Most caps: Giorgos Karagounis (139)
- Top scorer: Nikos Anastopoulos (29)
- Home stadium: Karaiskakis Stadium
- FIFA code: GRE
First colours	Second colours

FIFA ranking
- Current: 40 ▲1 (18 November 2026)
- Highest: 8 (April 2008, October 2011)
- Lowest: 66 (September 1998)

First international
- Greece 1–4 Italy (Piraeus, Greece; 7 April 1929)

Biggest win
- Greece 8–0 Syria (Athens, Greece; 25 November 1949)

Biggest defeat
- Hungary 11–1 Greece (Budapest, Hungary; 25 March 1938)

World Cup
- Appearances: 3 (first in 1994, last in 2014)
- Best result: Round of 16 (2014)

European Championship
- Appearances: 4 (first in 1980)
- Best result: Champions (2004)

Olympic Games
- Appearances: 3 (first in 1920)
- Best result: Round of 16 (1920, 1952)

Confederations Cup
- Appearances: 1 (first in 2005)
- Best result: Group stage (2005)
Medal record
Men's football
UEFA European Championship
Gold medal – first place	2004 Portugal	Team
Mediterranean Games
Gold medal – first place	1951 Alexandria	Team
Gold medal – first place	1991 Athens	Team
Bronze medal – third place	1997 Bari	Team
Mediterranean Cup
Silver medal – second place	1950–53 Mediterranean Cup
Balkan Cup
Silver medal – second place	1934–35 Balkan Cup
Bronze medal – third place	1929–31 Balkan Cup
Bronze medal – third place	1935 Balkan Cup
Bronze medal – third place	1936 Balkan Cup
- Website: epo.gr

The Greece national football team (Greek: εθνική ομάδα ποδοσφαίρου Ελλάδας, romanized: ethnikí omáda podosfaírou Elládas) represents Greece in men's international football matches, and is controlled by the Hellenic Football Federation, the governing body for football in Greece. Greece is one of only ten national teams to have been crowned UEFA European Champions.

Greece's first appearance in a major tournaments was at UEFA Euro 1980 and the 1994 FIFA World Cup. The UEFA Euro 2004 marked the highest point in Greece's football history when they won the tournament in only their second participation. Dismissed as rank outsiders before the tournament, Greece defeated some of the favourites in the competition including defending European champions France, and hosts Portugal twice (the opening game of the tournament and again in the final). In the decade after the 2004 victory, Greece qualified for the finals tournament of all but one major competition entered, reaching also during that period, an all-time high of eighth in the FIFA World Rankings.

== History ==
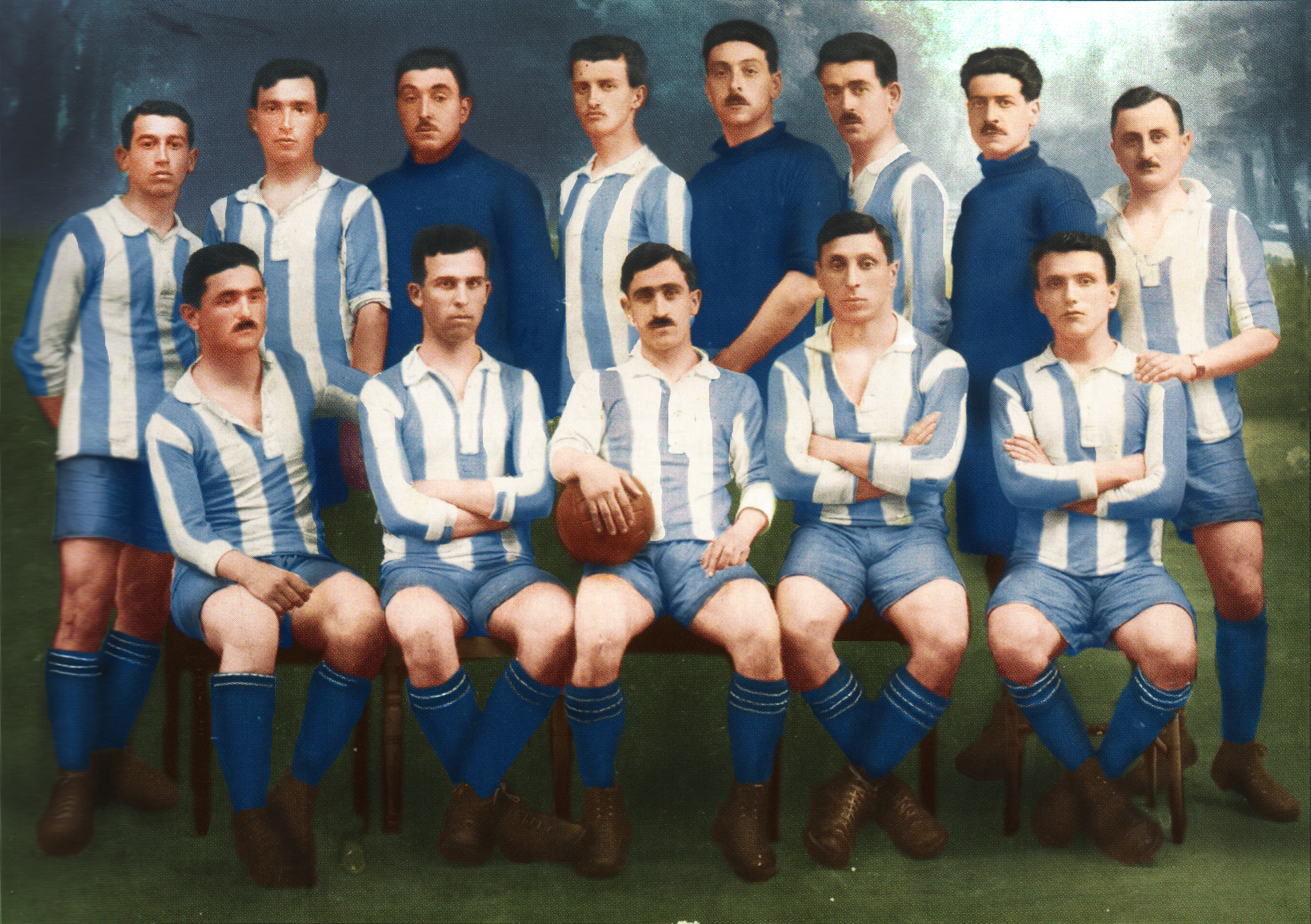
The national team for the Inter-Allied Games in Paris, 1919

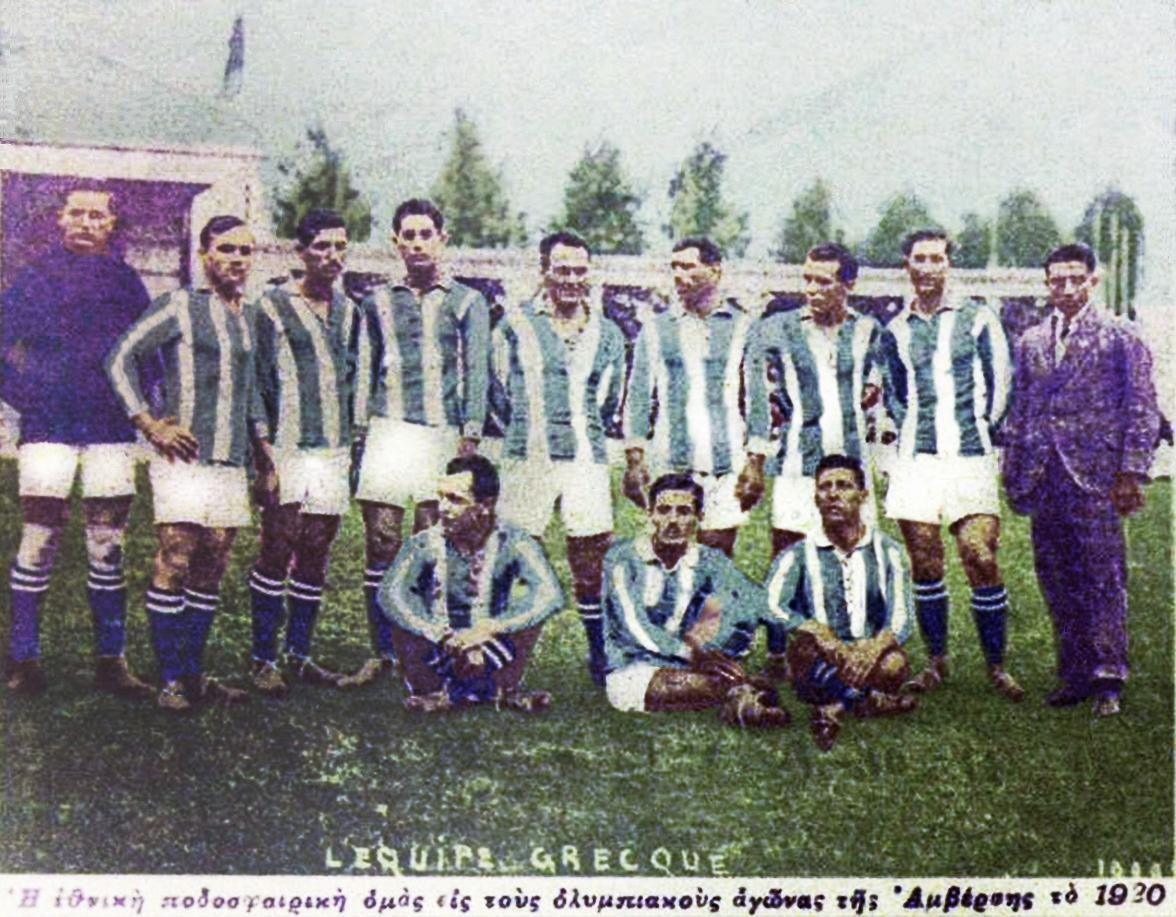
Greece squad for the 1920 Olympics

=== First years ===
On 12 April 1896, a Greek XI represented by Podilatikos Syllogos Athinon lost to a Denmark XI by either 9–0 or 15–0, at the Neo Phaliron Velodrome in Athens in a demonstration game during the 1896 Olympic Games.

The first three editions of the Olympic football event (1900–06) had an unofficial status, as the event was not yet open for national football teams to compete, and only had limited participation of three or four club teams from a few nations. Greece had no club team invited in the 1900 Olympics and the 1904 Olympics, but then hosted the 1906 Olympics, competing against a Danish club team again (DBU Copenhagen) and two club teams from the Ottoman Empire (Smyrna and Thessaloniki). The team to represent Greece compiled of players from Athens, hence the Athens City selection, and in the final they conceded 9 goals from the Denmark XI in the first half alone, and thereby they withdrew from the final at half time, and were then invited to a play-off in a match to decide the second place, but Athens declined and were promptly ejected from the tournament.

Greece had to wait 13 years for their next (unofficial) appearance when they participated in the Inter-Allied Games in Paris in 1919, following the end of World War I, and once again it was a disaster as the team conceded twenty goals without reply in their first two games, although this time with a silver lining since Greece managed to beat Romania in their third and final match with a dramatic 3–2 win. In the following year, Greece participated in the 1920 Summer Games of Antwerp, being knocked out in the first round by Sweden with yet another heavy defeat (9–0). This match is recognized as their first official match by FIFA. Notable figures during these years was Giorgos Kalafatis, player and later manager of the team, and Giannis Andrianopoulos.

The Greece national team's first official match came on 7 April 1929 in a 1–4 loss to Italy B, with Alberto Nahmias being the author of the nation's first-ever official goal.

=== 1930s Balkan Cups ===
Between 1929 and 1936, Greece participated in six Balkan Cups, with their best campaign coming in the 1934–35 Balkan Cup when they finished second, just one point short of Yugoslavia. A notable figure during these years was Kostas Choumis, who scored a total of 7 goals in the Balkan Cup, being among the all-time top goal scorers in the competition's history.

=== 1950s Mediterranean Cups ===
Between 1949 and 1958, Greece participated in three Mediterranean Cups, with their best campaign coming in the 1950–53 Mediterranean Cup when they finished second just one point short of Italy B. A notable figure during these years was Georgios Darivas, who was the top goal scorer of the 1950-53 edition with 4 goals, a tally that includes a hat-trick against Turkey.

In 1951, Greece also won the 1st edition of the Mediterranean Games men's football tournament, held in Alexandria, Egypt, defeating both Syria and the hosts Egypt on their way to the title. The star of the Greece team was Nikos Lekatsas, who was the top goal scorer with 4 goals, a tally that includes a hat-trick against Syria.

=== 1970s World Cups near misses ===
During the following decades, Greece had passion but little international success in the sport, as the nation's economic and social situations after World War II did not allow for successful development of a national team.

At its best, Greece narrowly missed qualifying for two FIFA World Cup competitions: 1970 (despite a quality team, including some of its greatest-ever players, such as Mimis Domazos, Giorgos Sideris, Giorgos Koudas and Mimis Papaioannou), and 1978.

=== Euro 1980 ===
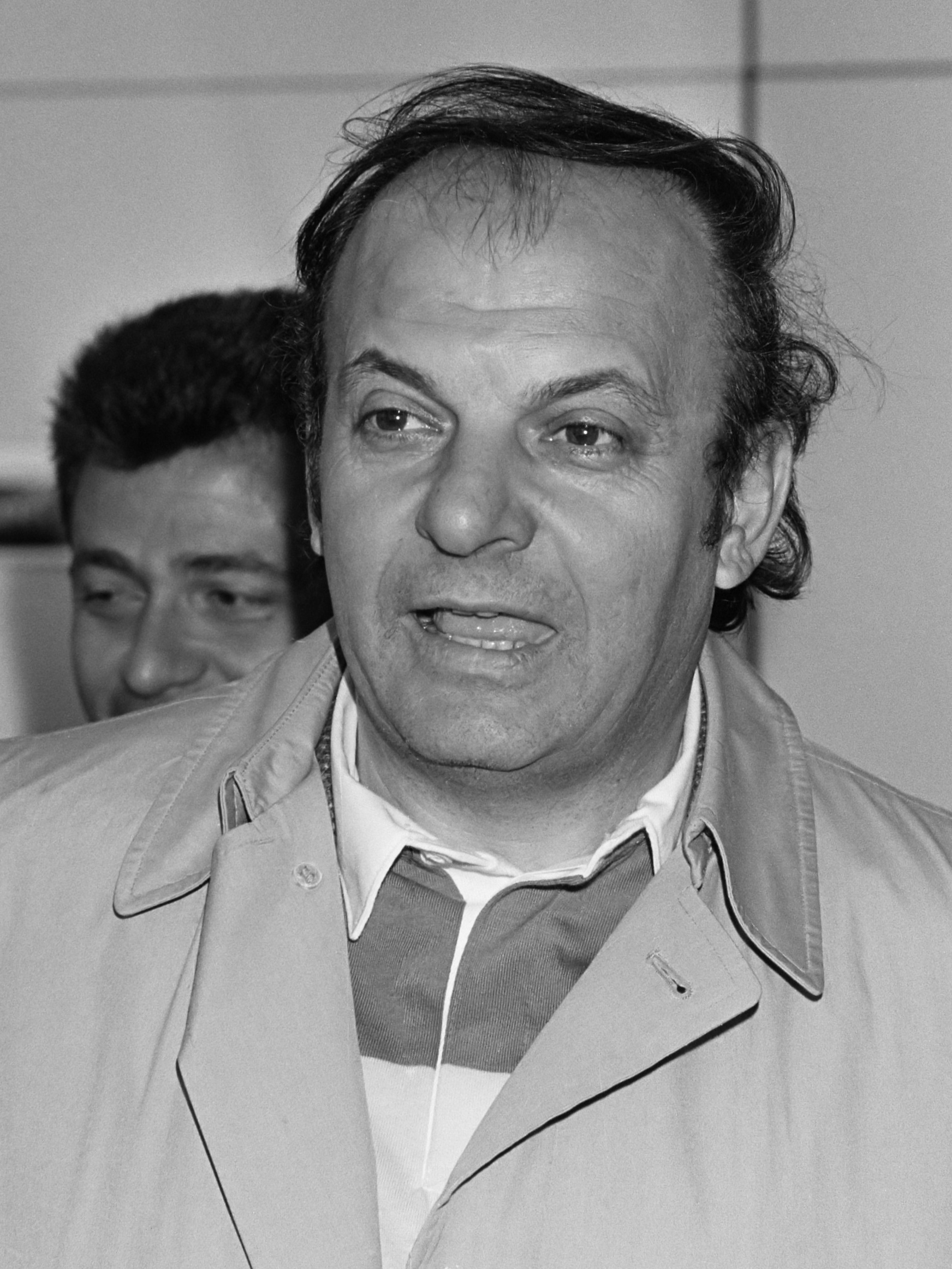
Alketas Panagoulias led Greece to the Euro 1980 and 1994 FIFA World Cup

Greece, under the guidance of Alketas Panagoulias, made its first appearance in a major tournament at the Euro 1980 in Italy, after qualifying top of a group that included the Soviet Union and Hungary, both world football powers. In the final tournament, Greece was drawn into group A with West Germany, the Netherlands, and Czechoslovakia. In their first game, Greece held the Dutch until the only goal of the game was scored with a penalty kick by Kist, in the 65th minute. Three days later Greece played Czechoslovakia in Rome. After holding the Czechoslovaks 1–1 at the end the first half, Greece eventually lost 3–1. In their last game, Greece earned a 0–0 draw against eventual winners West Germany, concluding what was considered a decent overall performance in the team's maiden presence in a final phase of any football competition.

=== Wilderness before 1994 ===
Greece failed to qualify for six competitive tournaments: three World Cups and three Euros, during which the Greeks largely produced poor performance. Despite this, Greece did have some surprisingly good results, such as a shock away draw to Italy in the 1982 FIFA World Cup qualification; a 3–2 win away over Hungary and a goalless draw away to England for the UEFA Euro 1984 qualifying; a goalless home draw to Belgium in the 1986 FIFA World Cup qualification; a surprise 1–0 home victory over Poland in the UEFA Euro 1988 qualifying; a 1–0 shock home win over Bulgaria and a 1–1 draw to Denmark in the 1990 FIFA World Cup qualification; and a heroic 3–2 comeback victory over Portugal. However, Greece suffered from shortage of quality strikers and its defence was largely disorganized at best, resulting in Greece botching important games and thus failed to qualify.

=== 1994 World Cup ===
The team's success in qualifying for the 1994 FIFA World Cup in the United States, marked the first time they had made it to the FIFA World Cup finals. Greece finished first and undefeated in their qualifying group, surpassing Russia in the final game. In the final tournament Greece were drawn into Group D with Nigeria, Bulgaria, and Argentina. After the successful qualifying campaign, expectations back in Greece were high as no one could imagine the oncoming astounding failure. Most notable reason for this complete failure was that Alketas Panagoulias opted to take a squad full of those players – though most of them aging and out of form – that helped the team in the qualifying instead of new emerging talents seeing it as a reward for their unprecedented success. Furthermore, they had the disadvantage of being drawn into a "group of death", with runners-up at the 1990 FIFA World Cup Argentina, later semifinalists Bulgaria, and Nigeria, one of the strongest African teams. Panagoulias was also criticized for his and the Greek Federation's practice of carrying the players around to various events of the Greek community and sponsors before the official matches. It is worth mentioning that all players of the squad, including the three goalkeepers, took part in those three games, something very rare.

This tournament was humiliating for the Greece squad, though it was understandable (if not say predictable) given its maiden appearance and the vast disparity of quality of opponents. In their first game against Argentina at Foxboro Stadium just outside Boston, they lost 4–0. Four days later Greece suffered another 4–0 blow from Bulgaria at Soldier Field in Chicago, and then, in what would be their final game, they lost to Nigeria 2–0 at Foxboro Stadium again. In the end, Greece were eliminated in the first round by losing all three games, scoring no goals and conceding ten.

=== Near misses ===
Greece failed to qualify for the Euro 1996 finishing third in the group behind Russia and Scotland. In their 1998 World Cup qualifying tournament the team finished only one point shy of second-placed Croatia after a 0–0 draw by the eventual Group winners, the Danish. Croatia and Denmark would make the Semi-Finals and Quarter-Finals respectively, of that World Cup. In their Euro 2000 qualifying group, Greece finished again in third place, two points behind second-placed Slovenia in a highly disappointing campaign that saw the team lose at home to Latvia. In the 2002 World Cup qualifying Greece finished a disappointing fourth in their group behind England, Germany and Finland, which led to the sacking of coach Vasilios Daniil, replaced by Otto Rehhagel. Highlights of the campaign included a 5–1 defeat in Finland and the 2–2 draw that followed in England, the first of two games the Greece national team would be under the reins of the German coach.

=== European Champions: Euro 2004 victory ===
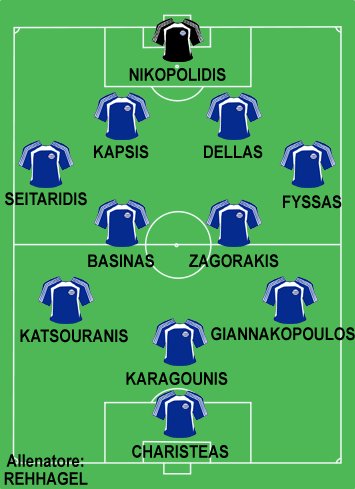
Greece line-up in Euro 2004

==== Qualification ====
Greece started the UEFA Euro 2004 qualification campaign with defeats at home to Spain and away to Ukraine, both with a 2–0 scoreline. The team went on to win their remaining six games, including a 1–0 away win over Spain in Zaragoza, securing first place in the group and an appearance in the European Championship finals for the first time in 24 years.

==== Before the tournament ====
Greece were the second-least favorite in the competition to win, with Latvia being the least favorite. Greece were also considered as outsiders and underdogs and were given odds of 150–1 of winning before the tournament. They were drawn in Group A, ending up with Portugal, Spain and Russia, a "group of death"; Portugal, hosts and favourites to win, Spain, UEFA Euro 1964 champions and favorites to win, and Russia, who won the first-ever tournament as the Soviet Union. Very few people expected Greece to proceed to the quarter-finals, let alone win the tournament.

==== Group stage ====
In the opening match against hosts Portugal, Greece achieved a surprise 2–1 victory, thanks to a 25-yard strike by Giorgos Karagounis and a penalty by Angelos Basinas. Greece received the nickname "pirate ship" (Το Πειρατικό) used by Greek sportscasters in reference to the floating ship used in the tournament's opening ceremony. Four days later, Greece stunned Spain in front of a largely Spanish crowd with a 1–1 draw after being down 1–0 at half time. Greece fell behind from a defensive lapse, which allowed Fernando Morientes to score. However a sublime diagonal pass by playmaker Vasilios Tsiartas allowed Angelos Charisteas to score an equaliser in the second half, giving Greece hope of qualifying. In the final group match Greece fell behind 2–0 to Russia (who were already eliminated) within the first ten minutes of the game but managed to pull one back through Zisis Vryzas and thus progressed to the next round, at the expense of Spain, on goals scored. Dmitri Kirichenko had the chance to eliminate Greece in the final minutes of this match, but his stretched effort squeezed just wide.

==== Quarter-finals ====
In the quarter-finals Greece faced off with the undefeated and reigning champions France. At 65 minutes Greece took the lead. Angelos Basinas played a perfect pass to captain Theodoros Zagorakis, who flicked the ball high in the air, past veteran French defender Bixente Lizarazu, and sent a perfect cross to Angelos Charisteas for the header and goal. Greece held on to win despite a late French onslaught, with close efforts by Thierry Henry, thus knocking France out of Euro 2004 and becoming the first team ever to defeat both the hosts and defending champions in the same tournament.

==== Semi-finals ====
Greece reached the semi-finals to face the Czech Republic, who were the only team to defeat all of their opponents to that point. The Czech record included a convincing 3–2 win over the Netherlands, a 2–1 win over Germany, and a 3–0 win over Denmark in the quarter-finals. At this stage in the tournament the Czechs were favourites to take the trophy. The game began nervously for Greece, as the Czech Republic applied much pressure. Tomáš Rosický hit the bar in the opening minutes, and Jan Koller had several efforts saved by Antonios Nikopolidis. The Czechs chances were dealt a blow when influential midfielder Pavel Nedvěd left the pitch injured in the first half. After 90 minutes the game ended 0–0, despite the Czechs having most of the game's missed chances. In the final minute of the first half of extra time, a close range silver goal header by Traianos Dellas from a corner of Vasilios Tsiartas ended the Czech campaign, putting Greece into the final of Euro 2004 and sending their fans into raptures.

==== Final ====
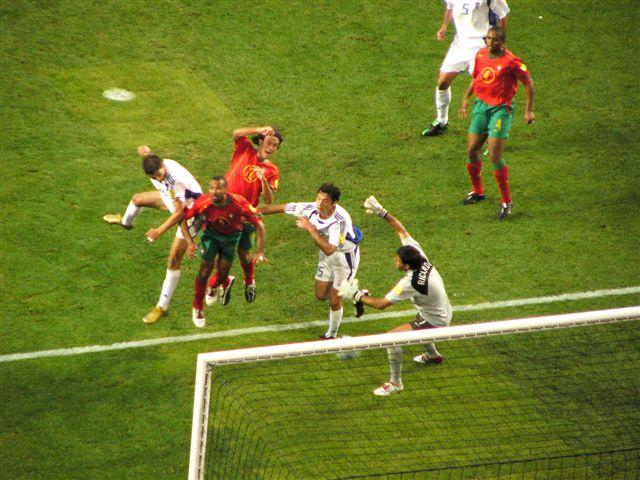
Angelos Charisteas scoring Greece's winning goal in the Euro 2004 final

Greece starting line-up against Portugal at the UEFA Euro 2004 final

For the first time in history the final was a repeat of the opening match, with Greece and hosts Portugal facing off in a rematch. In the 57th minute Charisteas gave Greece the lead with a header from a corner by Angelos Basinas. Portugal had much of the possession, but the Greece defence was solid and dealt with most attacks. Cristiano Ronaldo had a good chance to equalise in the dying moments, but could not apply a finish. Greece held on to win 1–0, winning the tournament, an achievement considered by many to be one of the greatest football upsets in history, if not the greatest. Greece captain Zagorakis was named the player of the tournament, having led Greece and made the most tackles in the entire tournament.

==== Recognition ====
Greece's victory shot them up in the FIFA World Rankings from 35th in June 2004 to 14th in July 2004. This is one of the largest upward moves in a single month in the top echelon of the rankings. The triumph of Greece at Euro 2004 is the biggest sporting achievement in the country's history for a team sport, along with the successes of the Greece national basketball team in the European Championships of 1987, 2005 and 2006 FIBA World Championship and the World Championship title of Greece women's national water polo team in 2011. The team has appeared on stamps and received medals from Konstantinos Stephanopoulos (the President of Greece), Archbishop Christodoulos of Athens, and an ecstatic ovation from the country's population which came out to see the team drive with the trophy from the Athens airport to the Panathenaic Stadium where the Greek political and religious leadership was awaiting them. The Euro 2004 winners were selected as "World Team of the Year" at the 2005 Laureus World Sports Award for Team of the Year.

=== 2005 Confederations Cup ===
As European champions, Greece qualified for the 2005 FIFA Confederations Cup in Germany and were drawn into Group B along with 2002 FIFA World Cup champions Brazil, 2004 AFC Asian Cup champions Japan, and 2003 CONCACAF Gold Cup champions Mexico. Greece lost their first two matches 3–0 to Brazil and 1–0 to Japan before drawing 0–0 with Mexico to finish at the bottom of the group. The squad included players such as Stathis Tavlaridis, Loukas Vyntra, Michalis Sifakis, Ioannis Amanatidis and Theofanis Gekas, all of whom earned their first call ups or maiden caps in the national squad.

=== 2006 World Cup qualifying ===
After winning the Euro 2004, Greece faced Ukraine, Turkey, Denmark, Albania, Georgia and Kazakhstan in Group 2 of the 2006 FIFA World Cup qualification tournament. Greece opened their campaign with a 2–1 loss to Albania in Tirana before draws with Turkey (0–0) and Ukraine (1–1) followed by a 3–1 victory over Kazakhstan.

In 2005, Greece resumed their campaign with three victories, defeating Denmark 2–1; Georgia 3–1; and Albania 2–0; before earning a goalless away draw with Turkey. Just prior to the 2005 FIFA Confederations Cup, Greece lost 1–0 at home to Ukraine after a late goal from Andriy Husin. Following a 2–1 away win against Kazakhstan, the team experienced a setback after a 1–0 defeat to Denmark in Copenhagen diminished their chances of qualification.

In their last game, Greece defeated Georgia, finishing in fourth place, four points behind first-placed Ukraine, two behind Turkey, and a point behind Denmark. Throughout the match, fans in the Karaiskakis Stadium chanted the name of Otto Rehhagel in their utmost support and he said afterwards "Even if 10 years pass, part of my heart will be Greek".

=== Euro 2008 ===
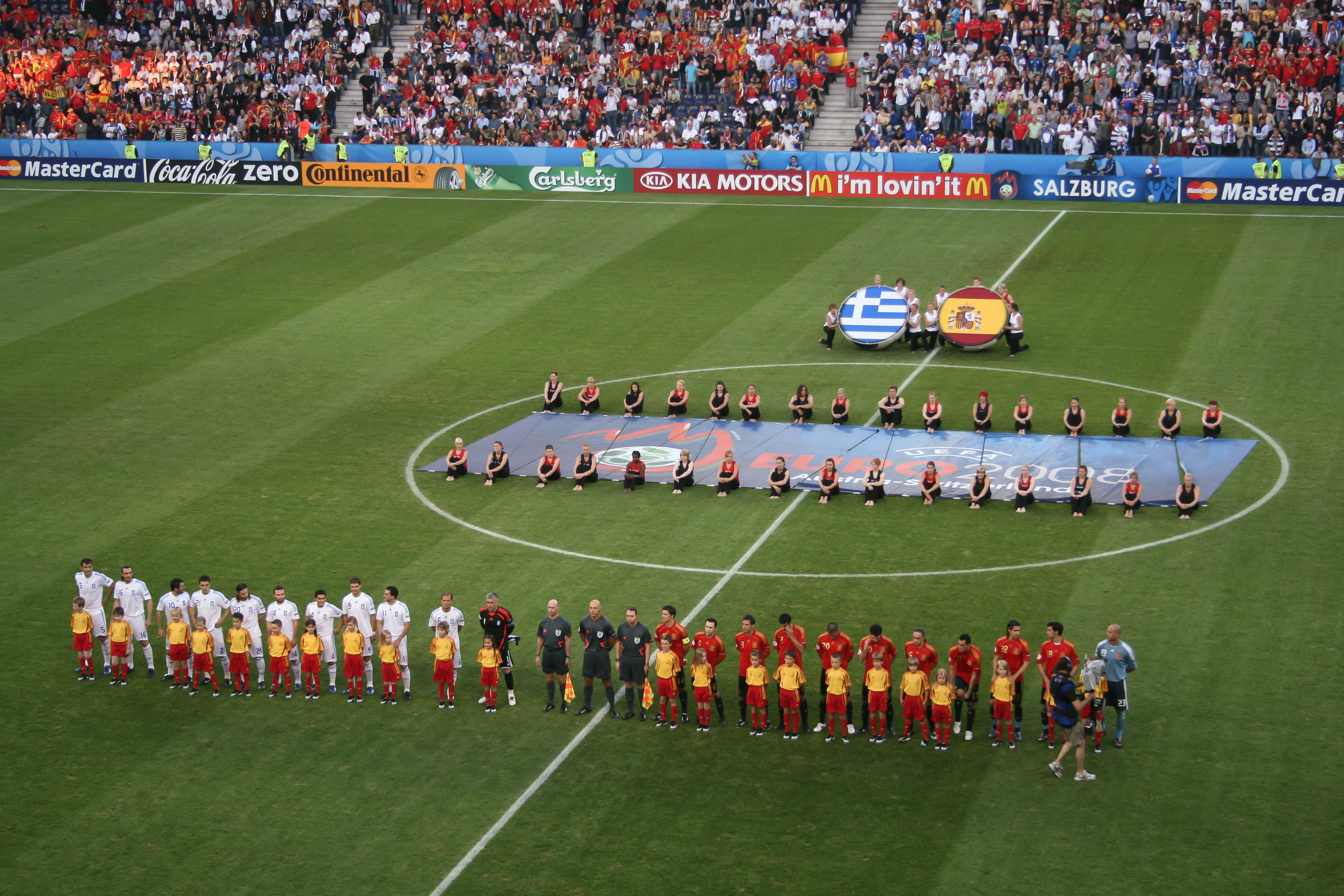
Greece vs Spain in Red Bull Arena during UEFA Euro 2008

Greece was the highest-ranked seed for the UEFA Euro 2008 qualifying tournament and was drawn with Turkey, Norway, Bosnia and Herzegovina, Hungary, Moldova and Malta.

They began their Euro 2008 qualification campaign with victories over Moldova, Norway and Bosnia and Herzegovina before suffering a 4–1 home loss against Turkey in Athens. Greece went on to win away to Malta, with the only goal coming in the 66th minute from an Angelos Basinas penalty, beat Hungary and Moldova at home and drew 2–2 away to Norway despite having hit the goalpost three times in this match. The draw in Oslo was followed by a 3–2 home win against Bosnia-Herzegovina and a 1–0 away win to Turkey, securing its presence to the Euro 2008 finals at their old rival's home ground. In the last two matches, Greece overcame Malta 5–0 in Athens and defeated Hungary with an away 2–1 win, finishing first in their group with a total of 31 points, the most points gained among any team in qualifying.

As defending European champions, Greece were top seed for the final tournament and were drawn with Sweden, Spain, and Russia in Group D.

In the tournament, Greece team lost all three games and scored only one goal. Greece underperformed in the opening match against Sweden and lost 2–0 before losing 1–0 to Russia. Having already been eliminated, Angelos Charisteas opened the scoring for Greece against Spain, but lost 2–1, becoming the first defending champion not to earn a single point in the next European Championship.

=== 2010 World Cup ===
Despite the prowess of Europe's top 2010 World Cup qualifying top scorer, Theofanis Gekas—who produced 10 goals in as many games—Greece took second place to Switzerland in Group 2 of UEFA qualification, thus advancing to a home-and-away playoff round, where they faced Ukraine. After a scoreless draw at home in the first match, the second leg in Donetsk saw Greece triumph with a 1–0 win, sending Greece to the 2010 FIFA World Cup. At the 2010 World Cup draw in Cape Town, South Africa on 4 December 2009, Greece found itself grouped with two familiar opponents from its first World Cup appearance in 1994. Argentina and Nigeria were yet again drawn into group stage play alongside Greece, this time into Group B with South Korea replacing Greece's third 1994 opponent, Bulgaria.

In its World Cup opener, Greece lost 2–0 to South Korea after a dismal performance characterized by excessive long-ball attacks and a lack of offensive creativity. In the second fixture against Nigeria, Greece won 2–1, coming from behind after conceding an early goal. Dimitris Salpingidis scored Greece's first-ever goal in the World Cup finals in the 44th minute of the first half to tie the match at 1–1. Vasilis Torosidis scored the winning goal in the 71st minute, securing the first points and first victory for Greece in tournament history. In the third match against heavily favoured Argentina, Greece needed a combination of results to advance to the next round. As expected, in what would be his final game as Greece's national team head coach, Otto Rehhagel conjured up a very defensive-minded strategy, leaving Georgios Samaras with nearly all offensive responsibilities as the lone striker. The strategy nearly paid off in the second half with the score still locked at 0–0 when Samaras beat the last Argentine defender on a quick long-ball counter-attack but curled a rushed shot just wide of the far post. Greece held Argentina scoreless until the 77th minute but ultimately lost 2–0, finishing third in Group B.

Greece moved from 13th to 12th in the FIFA World Rankings following the tournament. Russia, Croatia and France dropped lower than Greece while Uruguay and Chile jumped ahead of them.

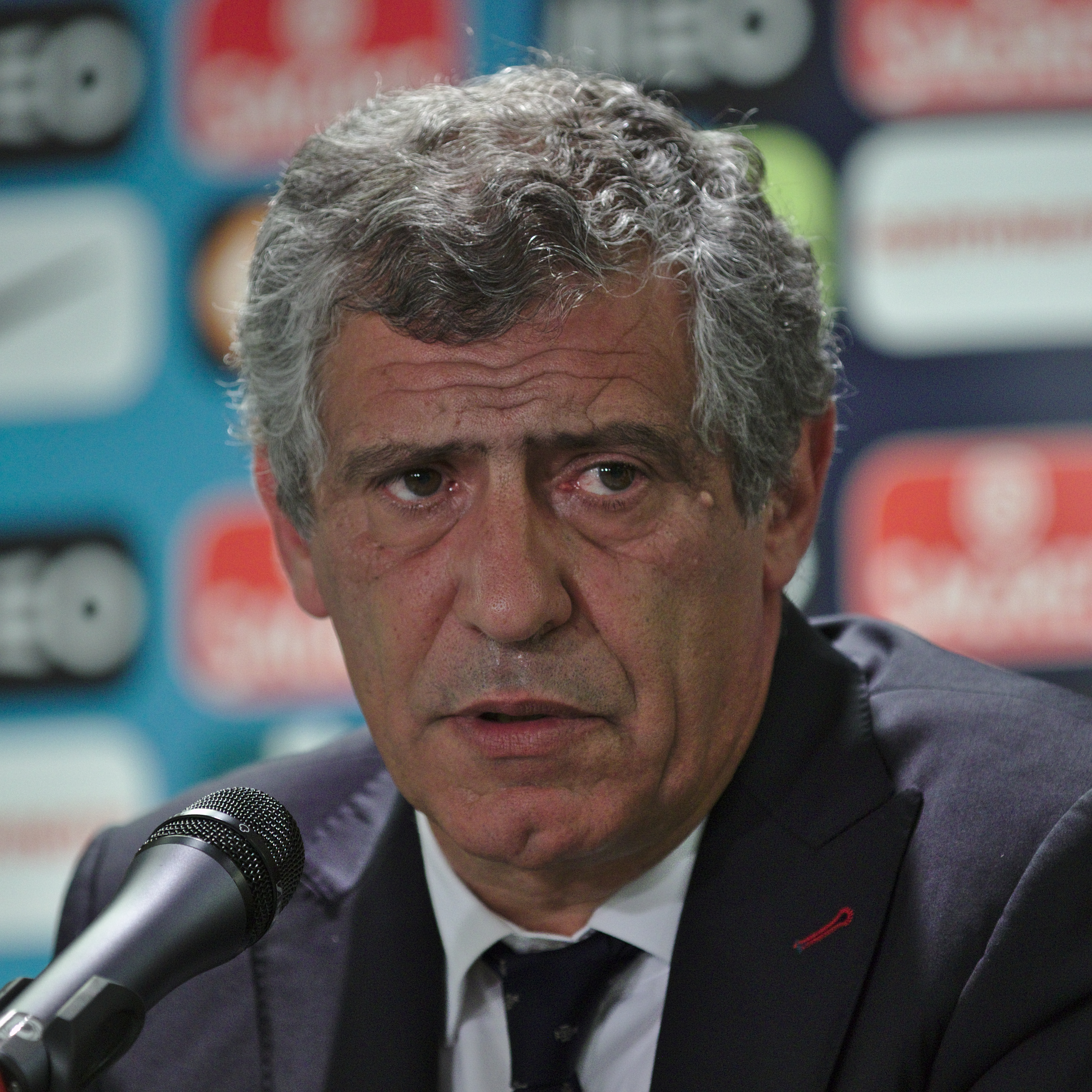
Fernando Santos

Twenty-four hours removed from Greece's World Cup loss to Argentina, Otto Rehhagel stepped away from his post as Greece national team manager. Eight days later a new era in Greece football was ushered in as the Hellenic Football Federation named former AEK Athens and PAOK boss Fernando Santos the new manager. Under Santos the Greece immediately went to work on an unprecedented streak of success, setting a senior-club record by going unbeaten in Santos' first seventeen matches as manager. While Greece's proficiency in stifling opposition attacks seemed to wane toward the end of Rehhagel's tenure, the emergence of Santos seemed to galvanize Greece defending once more. Through seven international friendlies and ten Euro 2012 qualifiers, Greece kept nine clean sheets and conceded just one goal in each of the remaining eight contests. From start to end of their unbeaten run, Santos' national side moved from No. 12 to No. 8 in FIFA's world rankings, equaling the highest mark in history credited by FIFA to Greece. Only one match from their streak featured a team (other than Greece) that appeared at the 2010 World Cup, a 1–0 defeat of Serbia in Belgrade.

=== Euro 2012 ===
==== Qualifying ====
With its late-game comeback victory over Georgia in October 2011, Greece padded its historic football tournament résumé, most importantly by sealing an automatic berth into UEFA's 2012 European Football Championship tournament. For the second time in team history the national side won its qualifying group for a major football tournament without a single loss incurred, as Greece also went undefeated in 1994 World Cup qualifiers. Adding to its 1980, 2004 and 2008 Euro qualifying campaigns, the Georgia triumph marked the fifth time overall that Greece has won its qualification group for a major tournament. Although their tendency to produce positive results remained steady throughout qualifying, so too did the Greece proclivity to start games slowly and concede early goals. This habit would plague Greece through qualifying and eventually tarnish their Euro 2012 performances.

Over two qualifying contests, Greece trailed Georgia on the scoreboard for 130 of 180 minutes and still managed to grab four of six possible points in the standings by way of three late strikes. Goals scored in the dying minutes of games, often coming from defenders, became somewhat of a Greek signature on Group F's table. In fact Greece was able to take and keep a first-half lead just once in ten games, the 3–1 home defeat of Malta which was ranked 50th of 53 teams in Europe. In Malta, a last-second tie-breaking strike from defender Vasilis Torosidis pocketed a crucial extra two points in the standings for Greece, the same number of points it held over Croatia at the end of qualifying. Despite allowing weaker teams in the group to bring the game to them, Greece admirably held powerful Croatia scoreless through two meetings and deservedly won Group F four days after a decisive 2–0 home win versus the second-place Croats. Theofanis Gekas, who retired from national team service in 2010 after Fernando Santos' third game as manager, came out of retirement in time to contribute a goal to the result. Gekas was eventually included in Santos's 23-man Euro 2012 roster, leaving out Euro 2004 hero, Angelos Charisteas who scored the group-clinching goal in the aforementioned Greece qualifying victory in Georgia.

==== Group stage in Poland ====
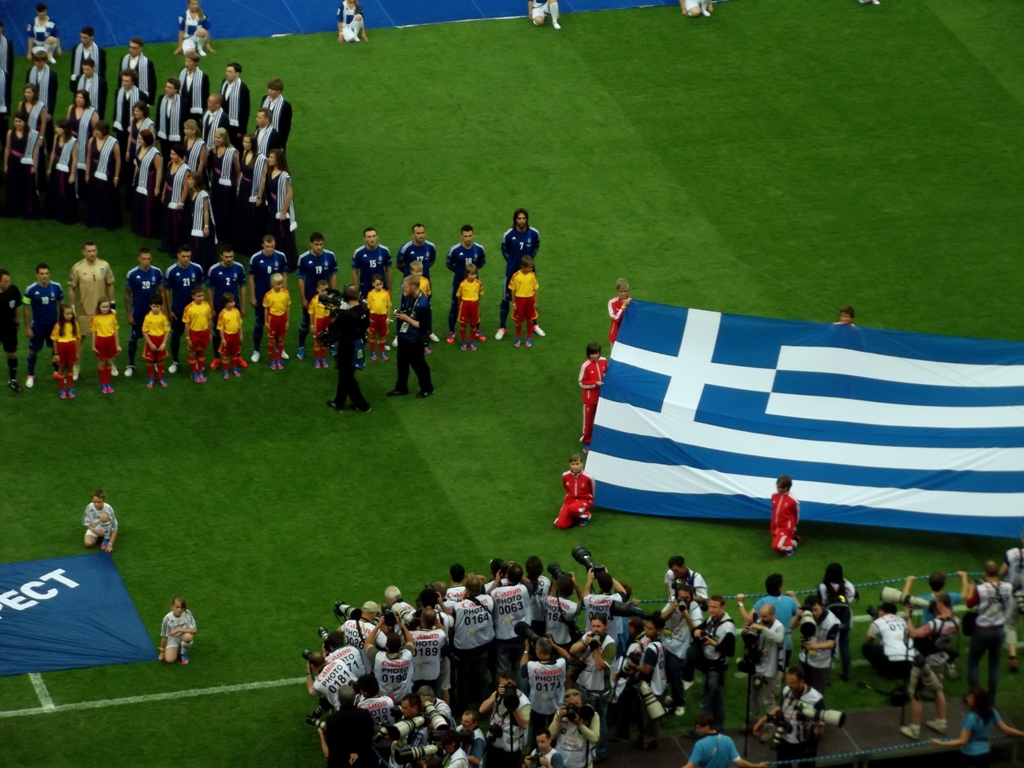
Greece players singing the Greece national anthem in Euro 2012 opening match against the hosts Poland (1–1)

"Shades of 2004" was a commonly perceived theme regarding the buildup to Euro 2012 for Greece and their progression through the tournament. As in 2004 Greece was drawn into the same group as the host nation, Poland on this occasion, and also had the pressure of playing in the tournament's opening match. Two familiar foes from its 2004 championship run, Russia and Czech Republic, joined Greece and Poland in Group A on 2 December 2011 at the tournament's final draw in Kyiv. Upon drawing the lowest-ranked teams from Pots 1 and 2 as well as the second-lowest from Pot 4, Greece's prospects of passing the group stage at Euro 2012 were given a boost.

Ideas of steering "To Piratiko" to a dream start in host-nation territory as Greece did in Portugal eight years before, rapidly turned sour during the opening match's first half. From the outset Greece appeared uncomfortable holding the ball for long spells and seemed content to allow hosts Poland to push numbers forward with the ball, hoping to score through counter-attacks. However, Poland made the most of its early possession, as top scorer Robert Lewandowski converted a header from a goal line cross past a scurrying Kostas Chalkias. Hope and momentum continued to tip in favor of Poland when Sokratis Papastathopoulos received his second yellow card of the game in just the 44th minute from Spanish referee Carlos Velasco Carballo. Greece began to boss the game after halftime while playing down a man. Dimitris Salpingidis made the greatest impact on the game for Greece as a second-half substitute, making brilliant penetrating runs behind the Polish defense, eventually bringing the game level 1–1 on a mistake by Poland keeper Wojciech Szczęsny. Salpingidis was then responsible for levelling up the numbers for Greece when Szczęsny made a red-card foul on Salpingidis' breakaway attempt on goal in the 68th minute. But Greece captain Giorgos Karagounis' subsequent penalty kick was turned away by substitute keeper Przemysław Tytoń. A second goal by Salpingidis was disallowed as he was assisted by an offside Kostas Fortounis, denying Greece's best opportunity to take three points from what ended as an improbable 1–1 draw.

The Czech Republic exploited Greece's weakness at the left-defender position early in the second group stage match, notching two goals in the first six minutes. Just as Poland had, the Czechs repeatedly penetrated Greece back line behind left-side defender José Holebas, scoring on a through-ball and a cross from Cholevas' side. Petr Čech's gaffe on a Georgios Samaras cross in the second half turned into a gift goal for Theofanis Gekas. The Czechs then eased off on their early pressure, opting to sit back and guard their lead for much of the second half, but Gekas' goal was too little too late. Greece lost the match 2–1, placing them at the foot of Group A in need of a victory over the attack-minded Russians to advance to the knockout rounds.

After thrashing the Czech Republic 4–1 and displaying more offensive potency in a 1–1 draw with Poland, the Russians were favored to earn the one point they needed to advance against the Greeks, especially since they defeated the Greeks in the previous two European Championships. However, Greece delivered a trademark 1–0 defensive victory and advanced to the Euro 2012 quarterfinals. Greece scored when Russia defender Sergei Ignashevich errantly headed a Greece throw-in behind the Russian defense for Giorgos Karagounis to pounce on. Greece's captain sprinted in on goal and struck the ball at the back post under keeper Vyacheslav Malafeev in first-half stoppage time to send the Russians reeling into the locker rooms. Ignashevich appeared to have conceded an additional golden scoring opportunity for Greece upon tripping Karagounis in the Russian penalty area early in the second half, but referee Jonas Eriksson instead booked Karagounis for what he believed to be simulation. This being Karagounis' second yellow card of the tournament, Greece was to be without its suspended captain in the next round. With that victory, Greece qualified to the quarterfinals for a second time after their successful Euro 2004 campaign.

==== Quarter-finals ====
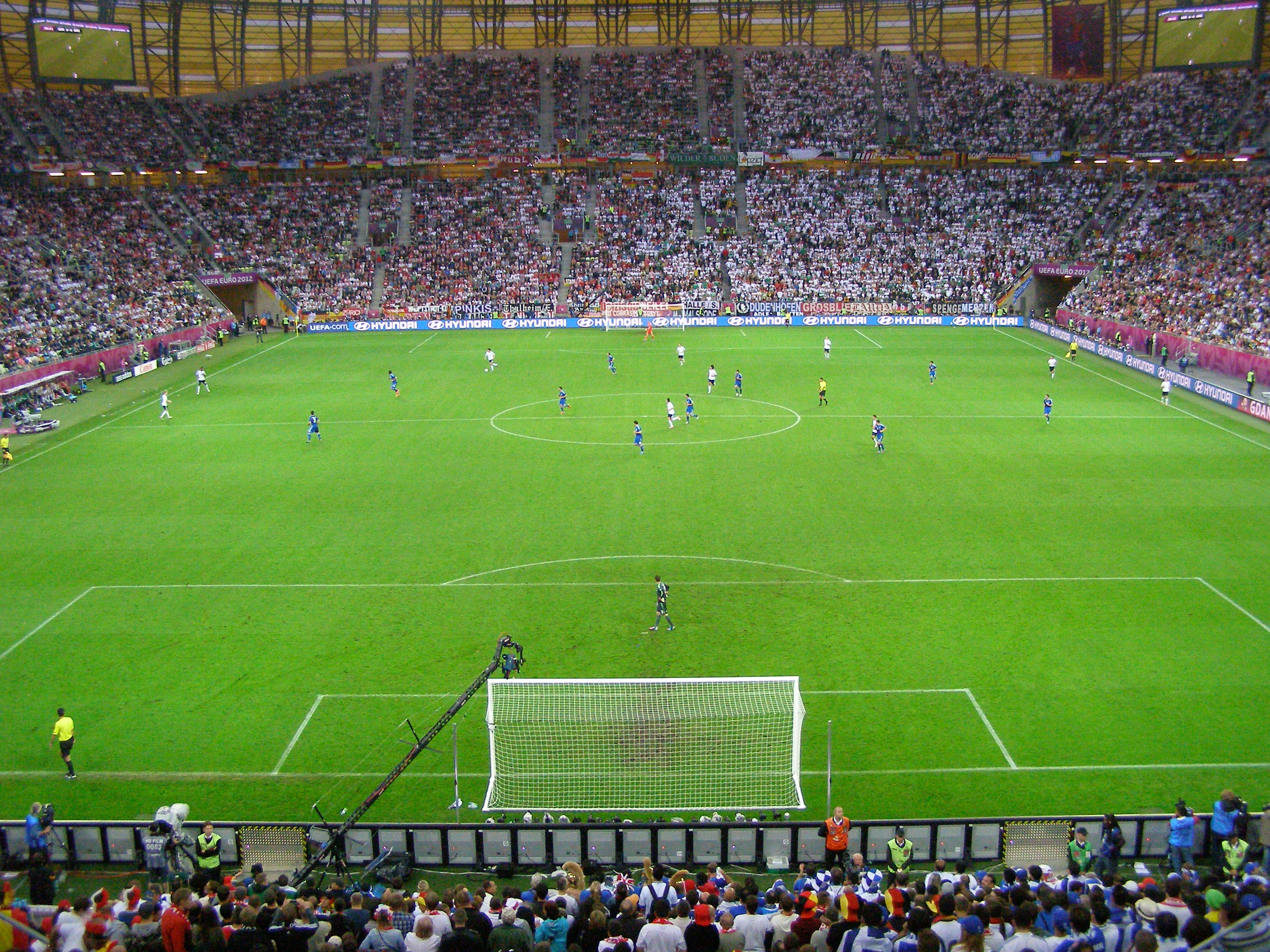
Greece played against Germany for a place in the semi-finals of Euro 2012, but they were eliminated after a 4–2 loss in the quarter-final match

In the quarter-finals, Greece met with a Germany side that won all three of its group matches against Portugal, Denmark and the Netherlands. Greece applied very little pressure in the midfield in the opening period, slowing the tempo of the game and affording Germany the majority of possession. Young Sotiris Ninis switched off momentarily in defence, allowing German captain Philipp Lahm to cut infield and open the scoring with a long-distance strike. Greece remained calm as in Georgios Samaras they carried a constant threat. On the counter-attack, they pulled level early in the second half; regaining possession in their defensive third, Georgios Fotakis found Dimitris Salpingidis streaking 40 yards deep into German territory. Salpingidis delivered a ball five yards in front of goalkeeper Manuel Neuer, which Samaras was able to meet and power underneath Neuer for the equalizer. Twenty minutes later, however, the Germans led 4–1. Greece scored an 89th-minute penalty kick by Salpingidis, but the match ended 4–2 to the Germans, ending Greece's Euro 2012 campaign.

=== 2014 World Cup ===
==== Qualifying ====
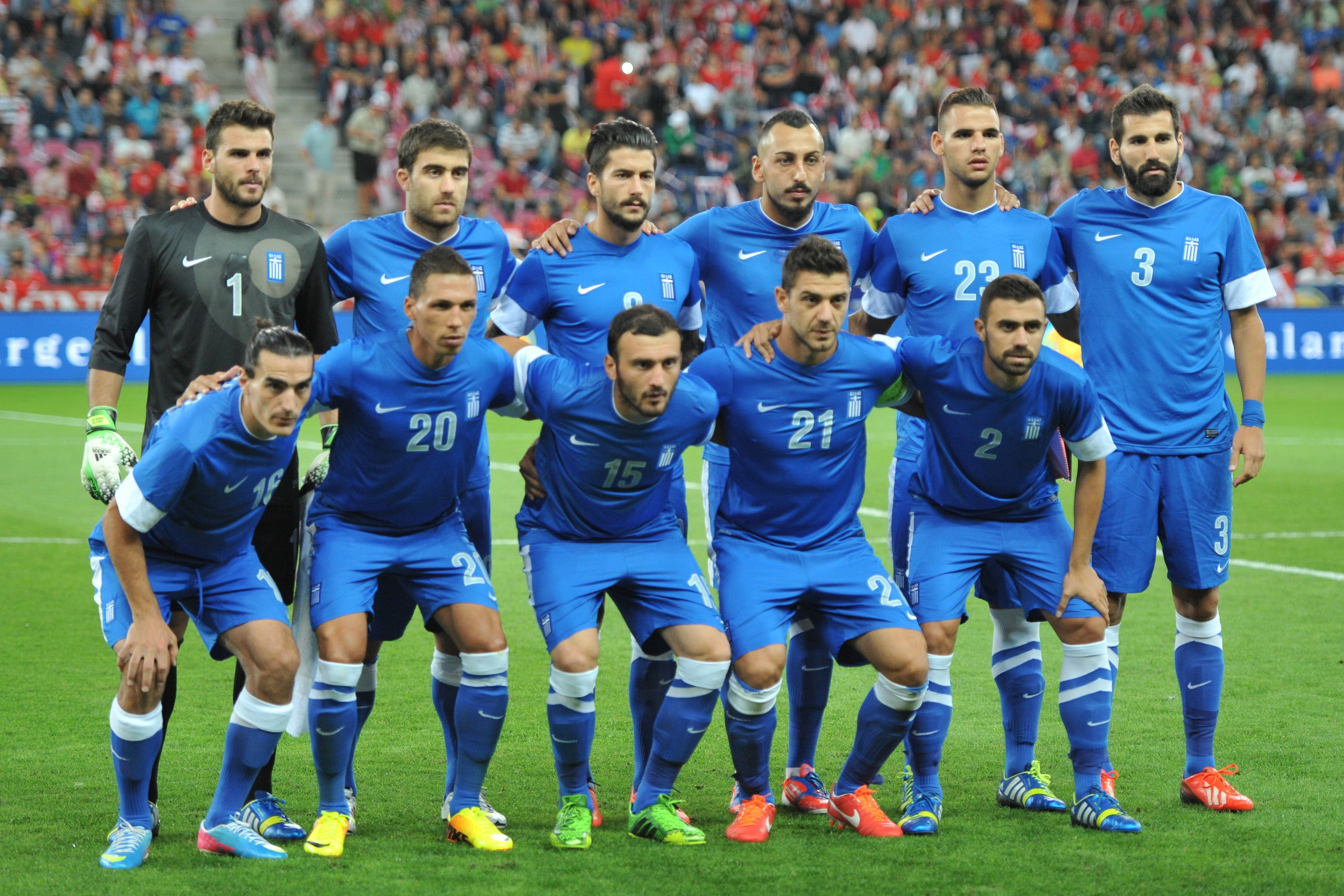
Greece national team in 2013

To reach the 2014 World Cup in Brazil, Greece had to contend with a team on the rise in Bosnia and Herzegovina and a dangerous Slovak side seemingly in decline since its memorable 2010 World Cup qualifying and finals performances. Latvia, a familiar qualification foe for Greece in its previous two major tournaments (2010 World Cup, Euro 2012), joined the fray as well. Ahead of those aforesaid tournaments, Bosnia twice narrowly missed out on its first major international tournament appearance due to consecutive playoff defeats at the hands of Portugal. No playoff would be necessary for Bosnia in 2013, as it won its qualifying group over Greece on goal difference. The decisive match was in Bosnia on 22 March, when Greece succumbed to three set-piece goals (two free-kick headers and one penalty miss rebound) in a 3–1 defeat. Greece's defense proved rigid throughout qualifying, conceding zero goals in open play. Four goals were allowed by Greece in ten games, the first of which was a penalty by Latvia, and yet four goals were too many for a relatively unproductive Grece attack to overcome. Though Greece was shut out just once, the team only managed to score 12 goals, an output Bosnia reached in its second game.

Following group play Romania, which claimed second place over Hungary and Turkey in a group dominated by the Dutch, awaited Greece in a two-legged playoff. The last time the two sides met in late 2011, Romania came into Greece and dealt Fernando Santos his first defeat as manager in his 18th game at the bench. Greece reversed the prior 3–1 result in their favour this time, scoring each goal through skillful one-touch passing and finishing. Kostas Mitroglou accounted for three of Greece's four goals in a 4–2 aggregate playoff victory, though none were actual game-winners. Dimitris Salpingidis notched the game winner in Athens, while the second leg finished 1–1 in Bucharest.

==== Finals ====
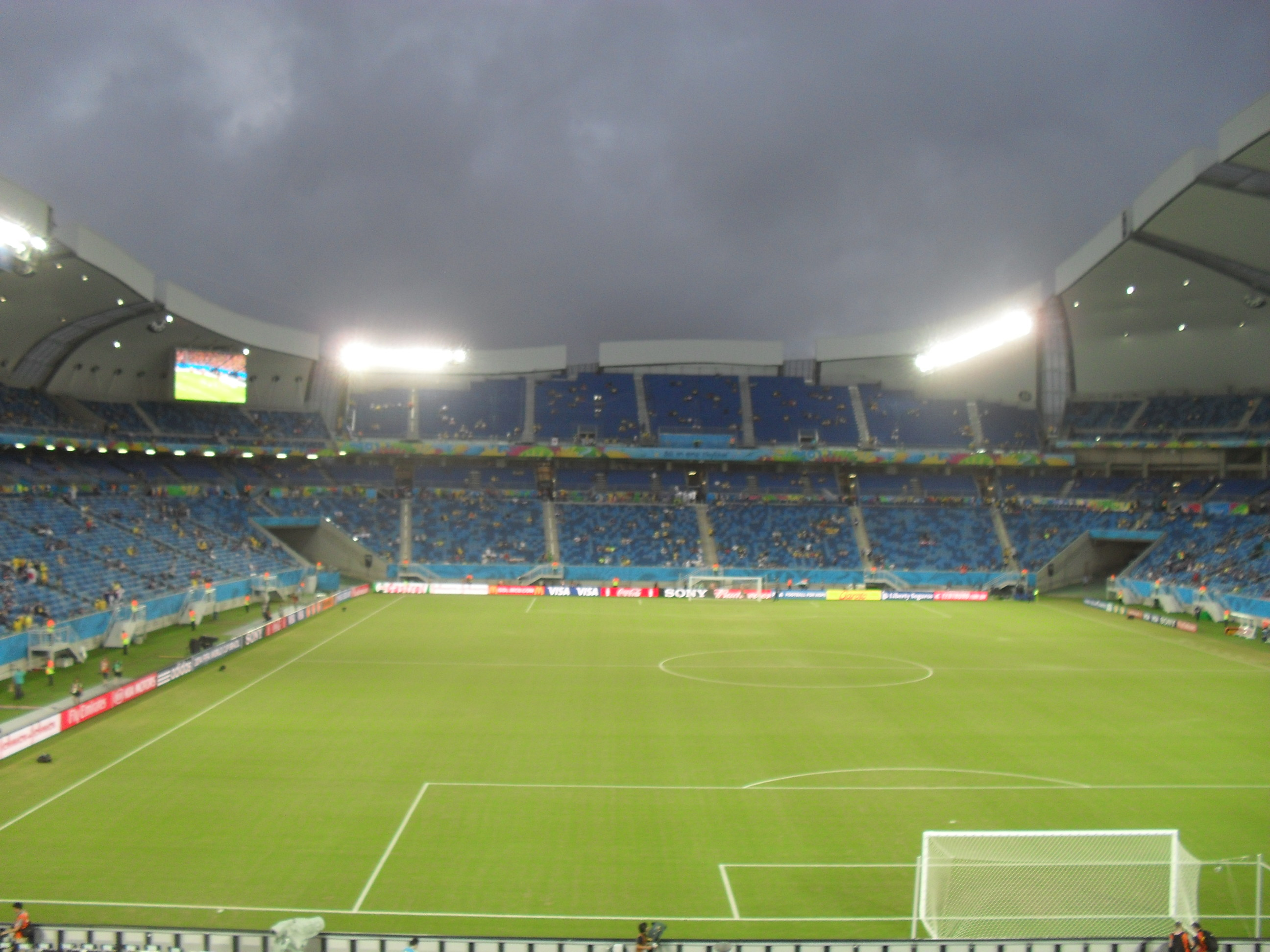
Arena das Dunas before the Japan vs Greece match

Aracaju was chosen as the team's base camp for the tournament in Brazil. Greece was drawn into Group C with Colombia, Côte d'Ivoire and Japan and ultimately created an extraordinarily similar tournament experience as it did two years prior at Euro 2012. Greece conceded an early goal in their first game against Colombia, but Panagiotis Kone narrowly missed equalizing just one minute after Colombia's fifth-minute goal. Trailing 2–0 in the 63rd minute, Theofanis Gekas' header from six yards struck the crossbar for Greece's best chance of the match. The Colombians proved to be the more clinical finishers, prevailing 3–0 despite an even number of shots for both teams and a slight possession advantage in Greece's favor. To stave off the threat of elimination, the Greece needed to earn at least a point in their second match with Japan, who sat alongside them at the bottom of Group C. The task grew more difficult once captain Kostas Katsouranis received two yellow cards, reducing Greece to ten men in the 38th minute. Greece held out for a 0–0 draw and remained tied with Japan on points. The draw made it necessary for Greece to defeat Ivory Coast in their final group match in order to reach the round of 16 for the first time in their history. An early injury to midfielder Panagiotis Kone brought on young Olympiacos midfielder Andreas Samaris, who would score his first international goal after intercepting a poor back-pass by an Ivorian defender. Swansea City striker Wilfried Bony equalized for Ivory Coast in the 73rd minute. In the first minute of stoppage time, Ivory Coast striker Giovanni Sio obstructed a Samaras shot by clipping him from behind in the Ivorian penalty area, resulting in a Greece penalty kick which Samaras converted with 30 seconds remaining in the game, prompting wild celebrations in Greece.

As Group C runners-up Greece was paired in the round of 16 with Group D shock winners Costa Rica, who won their first-ever World Cup group stage ahead of former world champions Uruguay, Italy and England. Trailing 1–0 but handed an advantage by the dismissal of Costa Rican Óscar Duarte, Greece forced extra time through a Sokratis Papastathopoulos equalizer ten seconds into stoppage time. This was the only goal that Costa Rica goalkeeper Keylor Navas conceded in open play throughout the tournament. Navas thwarted several opportunities for Greece throughout the 30 minutes of extra time and saved Theofanis Gekas' penalty in the game's concluding penalty shootout. Costa Rica claimed its first World Cup knockout stage victory and denied Greece its first by defeating Greece 5–3 on penalties.

=== After 2014 ===
==== Euro 2016 qualifying: Reorganisation and decline ====
The team appointed Claudio Ranieri as head coach in July 2014. He was sacked in November of the same year after a shocking home defeat to the Faroe Islands. Sergio Markarián was appointed in his place, but he too came under fire, after the team's terrible performances in the remaining UEFA Euro 2016 qualifying. The team's form after September 2014 proved to be abysmal, with no wins in over a year. Greece finished in last place in their Euro Qualifying group, earning just one victory against Hungary in the final round, and failing to qualify for the tournament. Greece, along with the Netherlands and Bosnia and Herzegovina were the only nations from Pot 1 not to qualify for the finals. Those three had taken part in the 2014 FIFA World Cup. Incidentally, the three teams would also fail to qualify for the World Cup in 2018.

==== 2018 World Cup qualifying: Resurgence ====
In attempting to qualify for the 2018 FIFA World Cup, Greece would suffer a second successive failure to reach a major tournament, despite improvements and some positive results. They finished second in Group H of the European qualifying stages, nine points behind runaway leaders Belgium and two points clear of third placed Bosnia and Herzegovina. Greece were subsequently drawn against Croatia in the play-off round, where they were knocked out over two legs; a 4–1 away defeat set the tone for Greece's campaign and in the second leg, they drew a blank in a 0–0 stalemate against the Croats to signify the end of their World Cup hopes.

==== 2018–19 Nations League and Euro 2020 qualifying: Inconsistency, fall and promising finish ====
Greece had to start their UEFA Nations League in League C due to previously poor performance. Greece won and lost three games each to these opponents altogether, and only finished third in the Nations League and was unable to promote to League B when UEFA revised the format.

Greece's qualification campaign for UEFA Euro 2020 commenced with the team being placed in Group J. Due to disappointing results, John van 't Schip decided not to call-up some of the leading members of the squad, such as Sokratis Papastathopoulos and Kostas Manolas for their final matches. A more youthful Greek showed a massive improvement in their attacking and pressing style of play. In the final three games Greece achieved successive victories. Greece finished third in the final table but this was still not enough to earn a play-off spot.

==== 2020–21 Nations League and 2022 World Cup qualifying ====
Having been forced to remain in League C due to poor performance, Greece had to start its campaign on their quest to be promoted. Greece needed a win in the last game against Slovenia at home to achieve promotion to League B. The match ended on 0-0, with Greece failing to promote a second consecutive time, despite being unbeaten and having conceded just one goal.

Greece was put in Group B for the 2022 FIFA World Cup qualifiers. The campaign started with an upset away 1–1 draw against group favourites Spain, but was followed by two 1-1 draws to Georgia at home and Kosovo away. A 2–1 home win over Sweden kept the hopes for qualification alive, and was followed by a 2–0 away win against Georgia. At the crucial away match in Stockholm, Greece made a good performance in the first half but eventually lost 2–0 to Sweden. Another loss, 1–0 at home to group winners Spain ratified Greece's elimination from the finals, with Greece failing to qualify for a World Cup for the second consecutive time.

==== 2022–23 Nations League and Euro 2024 qualifying ====
Under the instructions of manager Gus Poyet, Greece had a successful run in the Group C2 of the 2022–23 competition. The Galanolefki secured promotion to League B by topping the group ahead of Kosovo, Northern Ireland, and Cyprus.

Their Nations League success guaranteed them a playoff spot should they not qualify directly. They subsequently were put into the Group B for the Euro 2024 qualifiers along with the Netherlands, France, the Republic of Ireland, and Gibraltar. After they finished third in their group, they qualified for the playoffs due to their Nations League success. In the semi-final of the Path C play-off, Greece won comfortably at home against Kazakhstan (5–0), scoring 2 goals in the first quarter-hour and taking a 4-goal lead at half-time. However, they were eliminated in the play-off final away by Georgia on penalties (2–4) after a goalless draw throughout 120 minutes.

==== 2024–25 Nations League and 2026 World Cup qualifying ====
Greece entered its new UEFA Nations League campaign under the helm of Ivan Jovanović, who signed a 2-year contract. On 10 October 2024, they upset England at Wembley Stadium, defeating them 2–1. Vangelis Pavlidis, who scored both of Greece's goals, dedicated them to the late George Baldock.

===== Nations League promotion play-offs triumph =====
Ultimately, Greece would finish second of the table, having lost to England 3–0 at the mass-scale attended Athens Olympic Stadium in the reverse fixture that condemned the Greeks to second due to inferior goal difference, but secured a place for the promotion play-offs, in a two-leg tie against Scotland.

On 20 Match 2025, the first leg was hosted at the Karaiskakis Stadium in Piraeus, which was declared as Greece's national venue since 2024. A successful penalty kick from Scott McTominay at the 33th minute, leaded to a 0–1 home loss. Meanwhile, 17-year-old Greek-born K.R.C. Genk wonderkid Konstantinos Karetsas, whose change of association from Belgium to Greece was approved just two weeks before his first-ever Greek international debut as a substitute, was a key influence to Greece's full control during the second half of the game, despite their loss.

That paid off during the second leg hosted at Hampden Park in Glasgow three days later, when Greece, with an average starting-eleven age of a record-breaking 22.7 years, including the scoring attacking midfielder trio of Giannis Konstantelias, Konstantinos Karetsas (whose goal marked him as the youngest Nations League scorer, surpassing Lamine Yamal) and Christos Tzolis, dominated and overturned the Scots' initial result in a 3–0 away win (3–1 on aggregate), and secured their first ever promotion to the League A of the competition.

In the qualifiers for the 2026 World Cup, against Denmark, Scotland and Belarus, Greece failed to secure qualification for the final stage, finishing in third place in its group. Despite its strong start with a 5–1 victory over Belarus, the continuation was not similar, as the national team suffered defeats to Scotland in Glasgow (3–1) and to Denmark both at home (0–3) and away (3–1). This campaign left the team mathematically out of contention for qualification.

== Home stadium ==
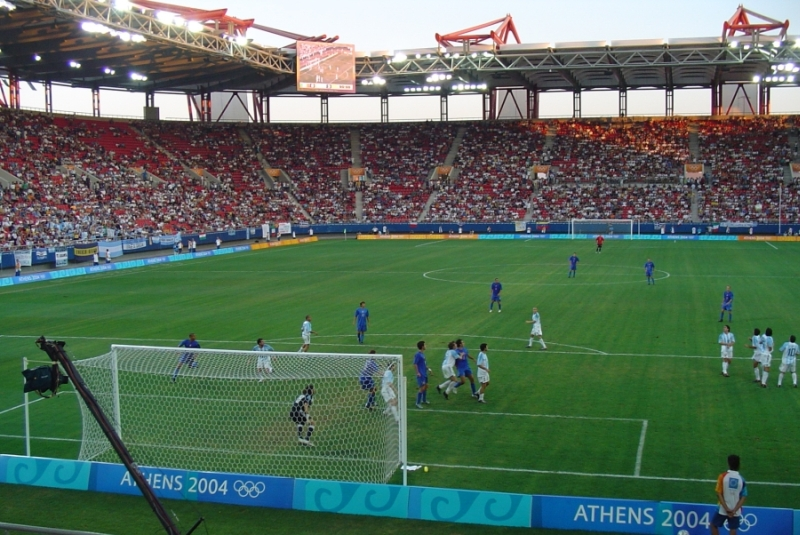
The Karaiskakis Stadium in Piraeus, the home ground of Greece from 2004 until 2017, and again since 2024

Traditionally, Greece has spent most of its history playing home matches in different stadiums primarily in or near Athens, as well as in various other cities across the country. The national team's home ground was the Karaiskakis Stadium in Piraeus from its reconstruction in 2004 until 2017.

Since their first international fixture in 1929 and for the next 33 years, Greece regularly used the Leoforos Alexandras Stadium as their home ground. Their first home match away from it was played at the Nikos Goumas Stadium in 1962, and the Karaiskakis Stadium was used for the first time in 1964 after it was renovated. In 1966, Kaftanzoglio Stadium in Thessaloniki became the first venue outside Athens to host the national team. From then on, these stadiums were alternated until the early 1980s, along with others like Thessaloniki's Toumba Stadium and Kleanthis Vikelidis Stadium, inaugurated in 1975 and 1977, respectively. Greece also played home matches at other venues such as Kostas Davourlis Stadium in Patras and Anthi Karagianni Stadium in Kavala during the 1970s. In 1982, the Georgios Kamaras Stadium was added to the list of Athens-based home grounds.

On 16 November 1983, the newly built Athens Olympic Stadium (OAKA), the largest in the country, hosted the national team for the first time in a UEFA Euro 1984 qualifier against Denmark. It served as the primary home ground throughout the 1980s and 1990s, until it closed for renovations in 2001. During this period, matches were also held at other stadiums, both in Athens and in provincial cities. From the early 2000s, the Athens Olympic Stadium was gradually used less frequently. Between 2000 and the Euro 2004 qualifiers, Greece returned to using the Leoforos Alexandras Stadium. From 2004 onwards, the Karaiskakis Stadium became the primary home venue, with few matches played elsewhere. In 2018, Greece returned to the OAKA for a friendly against Switzerland and announced it as the home ground for the UEFA Nations League.

For the UEFA Euro 2020 qualifiers, Greece initially planned to split matches between OAKA in Athens and the Pankritio Stadium in Heraklion, Crete. However, as the latter required upgrades to meet FIFA standards, the entire campaign was held in Athens. They remained at OAKA until 2021, before making a temporary move to the Georgios Kamaras Stadium later that year for the UEFA Nations League, with two matches also hosted in Volos.

On 7 March 2023, it was announced that the newly built Agia Sophia Stadium in Nea Filadelfeia, Athens, would become the national team's new home ground. However, for the 2024 Nations League campaign, Greece returned to the Karaiskakis Stadium in Piraeus for the first time since 2017.

Stadium	City / town	Pld	W	D	L	Win %	Years hosted
Karaiskakis Stadium	Piraeus	76	34	17	25	44.7	1964–1965, 1967, 1969–1974, 1976, 1981, 1983–84, 1988, 1994, 2004–2017, 2024–
Olympic Stadium	Athens	77	39	17	21	50.6	1982–2001, 2007, 2009, 2018–21, 2024
Leoforos Alexandras Stadium	Athens	58	27	11	20	46.6	1929–1965, 1967, 1970, 1973, 1976, 1978–1980, 1984, 2002–2004
Kaftanzoglio Stadium	Thessaloniki	19	5	4	10	26.3	1966, 1969, 1971–1972, 1975, 1977–1978, 1982–1983, 1985, 1991–1992, 1994–1995, 1997, 1999
Pankritio Stadium	Heraklion	8	6	1	1	75.0	2004, 2007, 2009, 2012, 2025–2026
Toumba Stadium	Thessaloniki	7	2	3	2	28.6	1975, 1995, 2007, 2021, 2026
Nikos Goumas Stadium	Nea Filadelfeia	6	2	3	1	33.3	1968, 1973, 1978, 1982, 1997, 2001
Agia Sophia Stadium	Nea Filadelfeia	6	3	2	1	50.0	2023–24
Kleanthis Vikelidis Stadium	Thessaloniki	5	2	2	1	40.0	1977, 1981, 2002
Theodoros Vardinogiannis Stadium	Heraklion	5	4	1	0	80.0	1995, 1997, 2001, 2003
Georgios Kamaras Stadium	Rizoupoli	4	2	1	1	50.0	1982, 2020, 2022
Zosimades Stadium	Ioannina	4	3	1	0	75.0	1982, 1992, 1996, 2002
Panthessaliko Stadium	Volos	4	3	0	1	75.0	2010, 2022, 2026
Anthi Karagianni Stadium	Kavala	3	2	0	1	66.7	1976, 1999
Diagoras Stadium	Rhodes	3	1	0	2	33.3	1987, 2000, 2002
Kostas Davourlis Stadium	Patras	2	1	0	1	50.0	1976, 2002
Alcazar Stadium	Larissa	2	1	0	1	50.0	1983, 1999
Pampeloponnisiako Stadium	Patras	2	2	0	0	100.0	1990, 2008
Kalamata Municipal Stadium	Kalamata	2	2	0	0	100.0	1995-96
Xanthi Ground	Xanthi	2	1	1	0	50.0	1999–2000
Chalkida Municipal Stadium	Chalkida	1	1	0	0	100.0	1996
Volos Municipal Stadium	Volos	1	0	0	1	0.0	1999
Kilkis Municipal Stadium	Kilkis	1	1	0	0	100.0	1999
Kozani Municipal Stadium	Kozani	1	1	0	0	100.0	1999
Trikala Municipal Stadium	Trikala	1	0	1	0	0.0	1999
Messiniakos Stadium	Kalamata	1	1	0	0	100.0	2000
Michalis Kritikopoulos Stadium	Kaisariani	1	0	0	1	0.0	2001
Alexandroupoli Municipal Stadium	Alexandroupolis	1	1	0	0	100.0	2002
AEL FC Arena	Larissa	1	1	0	0	100.0	2011
Perivolia Municipal Stadium	Chania	1	0	0	1	0.0	2014
Total		297	145	63	89	48.6%	

Last updated: Greece vs. Serbia, 16 November 2026

The following list contains foreign stadiums where Greece has been considered the home team. This list includes friendlies, FIFA World Cup and UEFA European Championship matches.

Stadium	City & Country	Pld	W	D	L	Win %	Years hosted
Beogradski SK Stadium	Belgrade, Yugoslavia	1	0	0	1	0.0	1932
Stadionul ONEF	Bucharest, Romania	1	0	0	1	0.0	1933
Yunak Stadium	Sofia, Bulgaria	1	0	0	1	0.0	1935
Levski Field	Sofia, Bulgaria	1	0	1	0	0.0	1935
Stadio Olimpico	Rome, Italy	1	0	0	1	0.0	1980
Stadio Communale	Torino, Italy	1	0	1	0	0.0	1980
GSZ Stadium	Larnaca, Cyprus	2	2	0	0	100.0	1999
Estádio do Bessa	Porto, Portugal	1	0	1	0	0.0	2004
Estádio do Dragão	Porto, Portugal	1	1	0	0	100.0	2004
Waldstadion	Frankfurt, Germany	2	0	1	1	0.0	2005
King Fahd International Stadium	Riyadh, Saudi Arabia	1	0	1	0	0.0	2006
Tsirio Stadium	Limassol, Cyprus	1	1	0	0	100.0	2006
GSP Stadium	Nicosia, Cyprus	3	3	0	0	100.0	2006, 2008
Craven Cottage	London, England	1	0	0	1	0.0	2007
LTU Arena	Düsseldorf, Germany	1	1	0	0	100.0	2008
Stadion am Bieberer Berg	Offenbach am Main, Germany	1	0	1	0	0.0	2008
Stadion Wals-Siezenheim	Salzburg, Austria	3	0	0	3	0.0	2008
Free State Stadium	Bloemfontein, South Africa	1	1	0	0	100.0	2010
Peter Mokaba Stadium	Polokwane, South Africa	1	0	0	1	0.0	2010
Cashpoint Arena	Altach, Austria	1	0	0	1	0.0	2011
Kufstein Arena	Kufstein, Austria	1	0	1	0	0.0	2012
Wrocław Municipal Stadium	Wrocław, Poland	1	0	0	1	0.0	2012
Warsaw National Stadium	Warsaw, Poland	1	1	0	0	100.0	2012
PPL Park	Chester, PA, United States	1	0	1	0	0.0	2014
Red Bull Arena	Harrison, NJ, United States	1	1	0	0	100.0	2014
Estádio Castelão	Fortaleza, Brazil	1	1	0	0	100.0	2014
Letzigrund	Zürich, Switzerland	1	0	0	1	0.0	2018
Total		33	12	8	13	36.4%	2018

== Team image ==
Greece's traditional colors are blue and white, originating from the Greece flag. Although blue was used as the home kit since the team's inception, white became the primary home color following UEFA Euro 2004. In recent decades, Greece has worn either a set of white jerseys, shorts, and socks or an all-blue combination. Formerly, the kit consisted of a combination of blue jerseys and white shorts and vice versa. Meanwhile, Greece's kit has occasionally featured stripes, crosses, or other designs, as well as various values of blue.

On 10 April 2013, the Hellenic Football Federation announced a partnership with American manufacturer Nike, with their first kit debuting on 7 June 2013 in the away match to Lithuania. On 4 March 2014, Greece unveiled their latest kit also worn at the 2014 FIFA World Cup.

The crest (εθνόσημο means "national sign"), which is used in the kit, is the official emblem of the national team.

=== Kit sponsorship ===
Supplier	Period
(Japan) Asics	1980–1981
(West Germany) Puma	1982–1987
(West Germany) Adidas	1988–1989
(Japan) Asics	1989–1991
(Italy) Diadora	1991–1998
(Italy) Lotto	1998–2001
(France) Le Coq Sportif	2001–2003
(Germany) Adidas	2004–2013
(United States) Nike	2013–2025
(Germany) Adidas	2026–

=== Nicknames ===
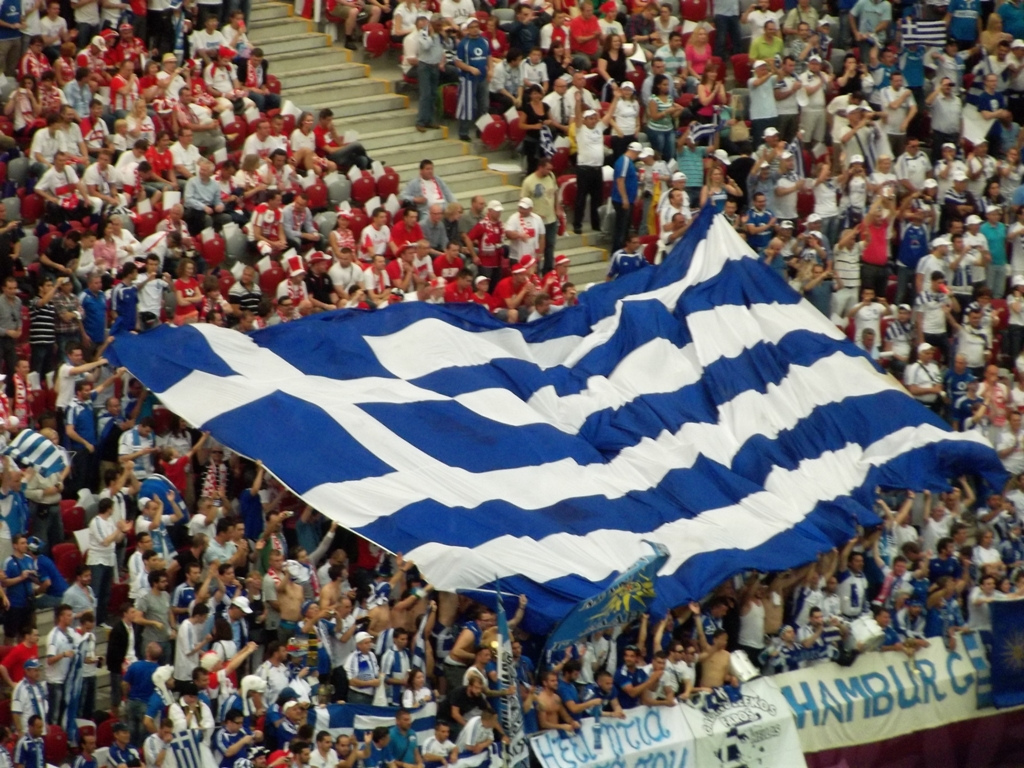
Flag of Greece held by fans

Traditionally, Greece is referred to by the media and the Greeks in general simply as Ethniki (Εθνική) in Greek, which means 'National'. The team is often called Galanolefki (Sky blue-white) due to the use of the colors of the Greece flag as kit colors. Both nicknames are used for the country's national teams in other sports as well.

During the opening ceremony at the UEFA Euro 2004, which took place right before the inaugural game of the tournament between Greece and hosts Portugal, a replica of a 16th-century ship was used referring to the expeditions of the Portuguese explorers of that time. Greek radio sports journalist Georgios Helakis, while broadcasting the opening match, commented that "since the Portuguese team appeared in such a ship, it's time for us to become pirates and steal the victory". Eventually, Greece beat the hosts and the team was described as Piratiko, meaning the 'Pirate ship', which emerged as the new nickname of the team repeated with every win during the tournament. Especially after Greece won in the final to Portugal, the new nickname was established to commemorate the coronation of Greece as European champions.

=== Rivalries ===
Greece has a historical rivalry with Turkey; having played them a total of 13 matches, winning three, drawing three, and losing seven games. Both countries have been described as "punching above their weight"; with Greece winning Euro 2004 despite being classified as underdogs before the competition, and Turkey followed-up their World Cup semi-final appearance in 2002 by advancing to the semi-finals of Euro 2008, where they were knocked out by Germany. The relationship with Turkey is very intense overall. It is fueled by a dispute between the two countries, the dispute over Cyprus, and several incidents occurring during matches between Turkish and Greek clubs, it has been described as one of the most intense international football rivalries.

Greece has also developed a rivalry with Romania, due to the number of times they have met in their history, with 36 matches being played across all competitions, including friendlies. Greece has won 8 matches and Romania has won 18 matches, with 10 matches between them ending in a draw.

== Results and fixtures ==
The following is a list of match results in the last 12 months, as well as any future matches that have been scheduled.

Win Draw Loss Fixture

=== 2026 ===
27 March 2026 Friendly	Greece	0–1	Paraguay	Piraeus, Greece
21:00 UTC+2		Report	D. Gómez 52'	Stadium: Karaiskakis Stadium; Attendance: 10,000; Referee: Daniele Chiffi (Italy)

31 March 2026 Friendly	Hungary	0–0	Greece	Budapest, Hungary
19:00 UTC+2		Report		Stadium: Puskás Aréna; Attendance: 54,849; Referee: Florian Badstübner (Germany)

4 June 2026 Friendly	Sweden	2–2	Greece	Solna, Sweden
19:00 UTC+2	Gyökeres 53'; Nilsson 69'	Report	Tsimikas 10'; Masouras 90+5'	Stadium: Nationalarenan; Attendance: 39,139; Referee: Aaron Wyn Jones (Wales)

7 June 2026 Friendly	Greece	0–1	Italy	Heraklion, Greece
21:00		Report	Esposito 18'	Stadium: Pankritio Stadium; Attendance: 13,000; Referee: Yigal Frid (Israel)

24 September 2026 2026–27 UEFA Nations League	Serbia	1–2	Greece	Belgrade, Serbia
20:45 CEST (UTC+02:00)	Živković 4'	Report	Tzolis 74'; Douvikas 90+5'	Stadium: Rajko Mitić Stadium; Attendance: 5,701; Referee: Glenn Nyberg (Sweden)

27 September 2026 2026–27 UEFA Nations League	Germany	0–1	Greece	Augsburg, Germany
20:45 CEST (UTC+02:00)		Report	Kourbelis 74'	Stadium: Augsburg Arena; Attendance: 28,945; Referee: Chris Kavanagh (England)

1 October 2026 2026–27 UEFA Nations League	Greece	2–2	Netherlands	Thessaloniki, Greece
21:45 EEST (UTC+03:00)	Ioannidis 23'; Masouras 45+2'	Report	Van Dijk 59'; Reijnders 89'	Stadium: Toumba Stadium; Attendance: 26,538; Referee: Marco Guida (Italy)

4 October 2026 2026–27 UEFA Nations League	Greece	0–0	Germany	Thessaloniki, Greece
21:45 EEST (UTC+03:00)		Report		Stadium: Toumba Stadium; Attendance: 27,599; Referee: Clément Turpin (France)

13 November 2026 2026–27 UEFA Nations League	Netherlands	7–0	Greece	Amsterdam, Netherlands
20:45 CET (UTC+01:00)	Summerville 6'; Reijnders 12', 18', 33'; Timber 40', 59'; Malen 61'	Report		Stadium: Johan Cruyff Arena; Attendance: 51,221; Referee: Rohit Saggi (Norway)

16 November 2026 2026–27 UEFA Nations League	Greece	1–0	Serbia	Volos, Greece
21:45 EET (UTC+02:00)	Masouras 69'	Report		Stadium: Panthessaliko Stadium; Attendance: 20,960; Referee: Michael Oliver (England)

== Coaching staff ==
As of 1 August 2024.

Position	Name
Head coach	(Serbia) Ivan Jovanović
Assistant coach	(Bosnia and Herzegovina) Predrag Erak (Greece) Dimitris Danilidis (Greece) Nikos Kolombourdas (Greece) Christos Karydopoulos
Goalkeeping coach	(Greece) Fanis Katergiannakis
Analyst	(Greece) Dimitris Broussalis
Sporting director	(Greece) Vasilis Torosidis
Sporting director	(Greece) Dimitris Salpingidis
Technical director (of all national teams)	(Greece) Dimitrios Papadopoulos
Press officer	(Greece) Nikolas Vasilaras

=== Coaching history ===
The following table lists all assigned football managers for the national team and their records since Greece's first international game in April 1929.

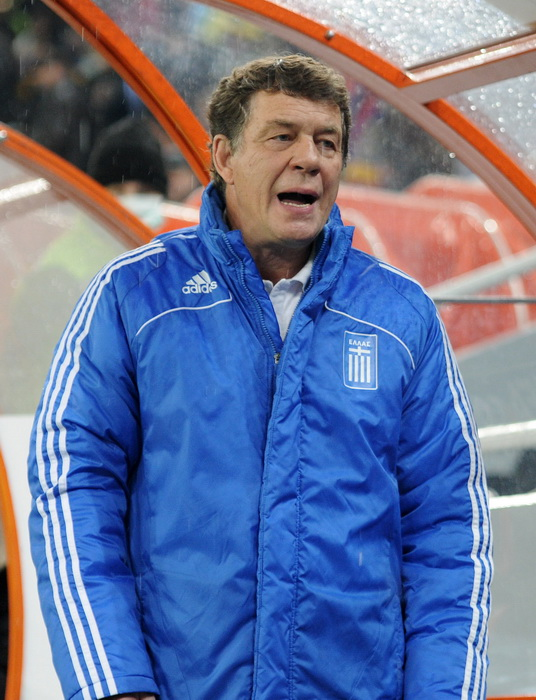
Manager Otto Rehhagel, under whose guidance Greece were crowned European champions in 2004

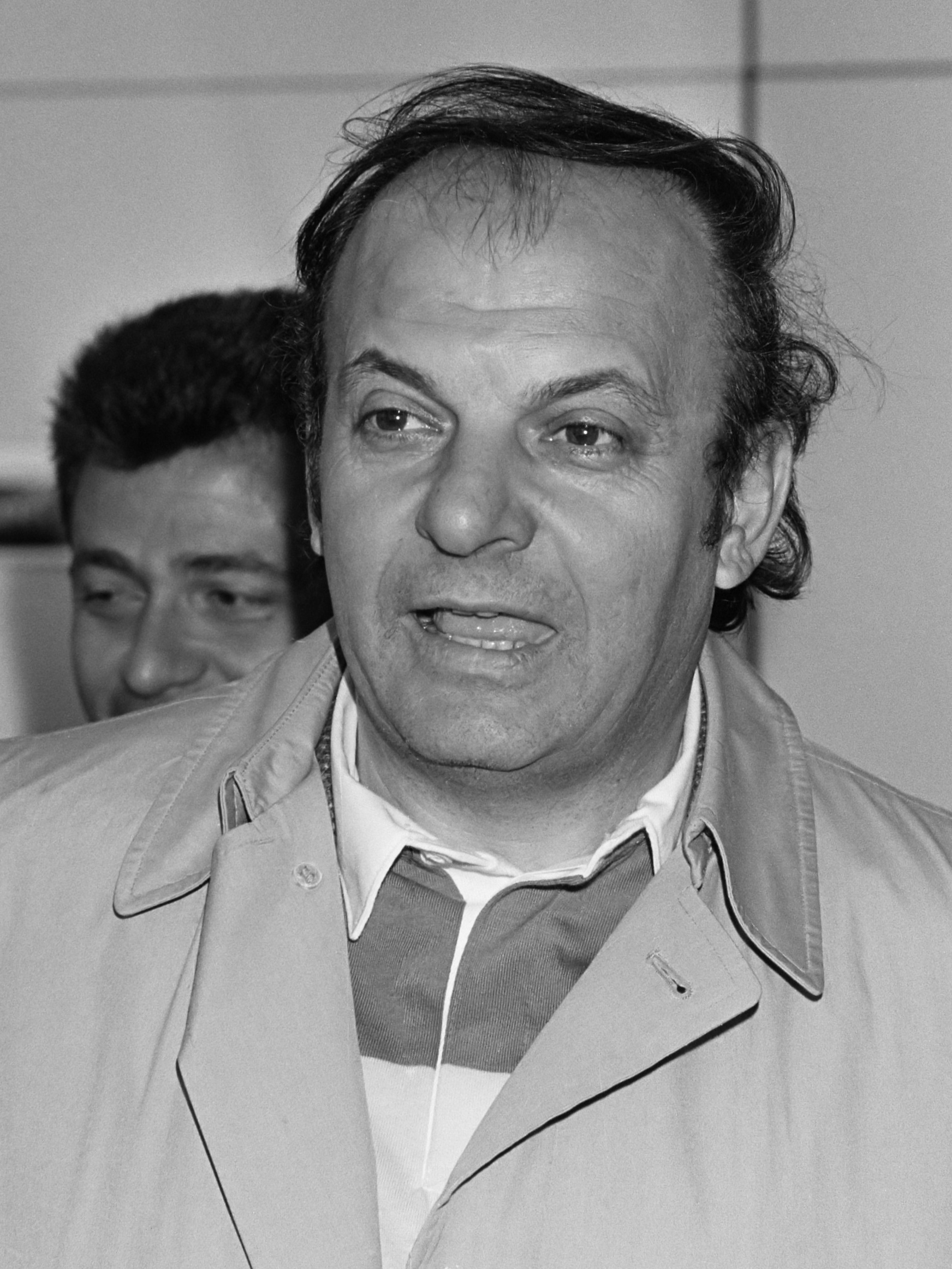
Alketas Panagoulias, with whom Greece first appeared at the European Championship (1980) and the World Cup (1994)

Updated 16 November 2026.

Name	Greece career	Pld	W	D	L	GF	GA	Win %	Major competitions
(Greece) Apostolos Nikolaidis	1929 1934–1935	5	1	1	3	6	13	20%	
(Czechoslovakia) Jan Kopřiva	1929–1930	3	1	1	1	4	10	33.3%	
(Hungary) József Schweng	1930	1	0	0	1	0	3	0%	
(Greece) Hellenic Football Federation	1930–1931	5	1	0	4	12	15	20%	
(Greece) Loukas Panourgias	1932	4	0	0	4	2	14	0%	
(Greece) Kostas Negrepontis	1933–1934 1938 1948–1950 1953	16	5	1	10	23	25	31.3%	
(Greece) Kostas Konstantaras	1935	4	0	1	3	6	16	0%	
(Hungary) József Künsztler	1936	2	0	0	2	6	10	0%	
(England) Bill Baggett	1938	1	0	0	1	1	11	0%	
(Greece) Antonis Migiakis	1951 1952–1953 1954–1955 1958 1961	12	3	4	5	13	16	17%	
(Greece) Nikos Katrantzos	1951	1	1	0	0	1	0	100%	
(Greece) Giannis Chelmis	1951 1954 1955	8	3	1	4	9	10	37.5%	
(Greece) Kostas Andritsos	1956	1	0	0	1	1	7	0%	
(Italy) Rino Martini	1957–1958	7	2	1	4	8	17	28.6%	
(France) Paul Baron	1959–1960	5	1	0	4	4	15	20%	
(Greece) Tryfon Tzanetis	1960–1961 1962–1964	11	5	1	5	19	25	45.5%	
(Greece) Lakis Petropoulos	1964–1965 1967 1969–1971 1976–1977	35	6	9	20	34	62	17.1%	
(Greece) (Socialist Federal Republic of Yugoslavia) Panos Markovic	1966–1967	2	2	0	0	6	1	100%	
(Greece) Kostas Karapatis	1968	1	0	0	1	0	1	0%	
(Greece) Dan Georgiadis	1968–1969	8	3	4	1	19	13	37.5%	
(Northern Ireland) Billy Bingham	1971–1973	12	2	3	7	11	23	16.7%	
(Greece) Alketas Panagoulias	1973–1976 1977–1981 1992–1994	74	23	20	31	89	121	31.1%	1980 European Championship– Group stage 1994 World Cup– Group stage
(Greece) Christos Archontidis	1982–1984	21	5	3	13	17	33	23.8%	
(Greece) Miltos Papapostolou	1984–1988	46	14	15	17	46	61	30.4%	
(Greece) Alekos Sofianidis	1988–1989	7	3	1	3	13	10	42.9%	
(Greece) Antonis Georgiadis	1989–1991 1992	30	11	9	10	34	38	36.7%	
(Greece) Stefanos Petritsis	1992	1	0	0	1	0	1	0%	
(Greece) Kostas Polychroniou	1994–1998	34	17	6	11	56	32	50%	
(Romania) Anghel Iordănescu	1998–1999	7	4	2	1	11	7	57.1%	
(Greece) Vasilis Daniil	1999–2001	30	14	8	8	46	34	46.7%	
(Greece) Nikos Christidis	2001	1	0	1	0	0	0	0%	
(Germany) Otto Rehhagel	2001–2010	106	53	23	30	138	111	50%	2004 European Championship– Champions 2008 European Championship– Group stage 2010 World Cup– Group stage
(Portugal) Fernando Santos	2010–2014	49	26	17	6	56	36	53.1%	2012 European Championship– Quarter-final 2014 World Cup– Round of 16
(Italy) Claudio Ranieri	2014	4	0	1	3	1	5	0%	
(Greece) Kostas Tsanas	2014, 2015	5	1	1	3	5	9	20%	
(Uruguay) (Argentina) (Armenia) Sergio Markarián	2015	3	0	2	1	1	2	0%	
(Germany) Michael Skibbe	2015–2018	27	11	5	11	30	26	40.7%	
(Greece) Angelos Anastasiadis	2018–2019	7	2	1	4	8	11	28.6%	
(Netherlands) John van 't Schip	2019–2021	26	11	9	6	29	23	42.3%	
(Uruguay) Gus Poyet	2022–2024	22	12	4	6	35	15	54.5%	
(Greece) Nikos Papadopoulos	2024	2	1	0	1	3	2	50%	
(Serbia) Ivan Jovanović	2024–	26	13	5	8	40	32	50%	
Total	1929–present	672	257	160	255	843	916	38.2%	
Santos has the national record of 17 consecutive unbeaten games.

== Players ==
=== Current squad ===
The following players were called for the 2026–27 UEFA Nations League matches against the Netherlands on 13 November 2026 and Serbia on 16 November 2026.
Caps and goals as of 16 November 2026, after the match against Serbia.

No.	Pos.	Player	Date of birth (age)	Caps	Goals	Club
1	GK	Odysseas Vlachodimos	26 April 1994 (age 32)	53	0	(Royal Spanish Football Federation) Sevilla
12	GK	Konstantinos Tzolakis	8 November 2002 (age 24)	14	0	(The Football Association) Hull City
13	GK	Christos Mandas	17 September 2001 (age 25)	4	0	(Italian Football Federation) Lazio
2	DF	Georgios Vagiannidis	12 September 2001 (age 25)	16	0	(Portuguese Football Federation) Sporting CP
3	DF	Konstantinos Koulierakis	28 November 2003 (age 22)	24	0	(Italian Football Federation) Roma
4	DF	Konstantinos Mavropanos	11 December 1997 (age 28)	48	2	(The Football Association) West Ham United
5	DF	Panagiotis Retsos	9 August 1998 (age 28)	29	0	(Hellenic Football Federation) Olympiacos
15	DF	Lazaros Rota	23 August 1997 (age 29)	31	0	(Hellenic Football Federation) AEK Athens
17	DF	Pantelis Chatzidiakos	18 January 1997 (age 29)	41	0	(Hellenic Football Federation) PAOK
21	DF	Kostas Tsimikas	12 May 1996 (age 30)	57	2	(The Football Association) Liverpool
22	DF	Dimitris Giannoulis	17 October 1995 (age 31)	34	0	(Hellenic Football Federation) PAOK
	DF	Manolis Saliakas	12 September 1996 (age 30)	7	0	(Hellenic Football Federation) Olympiacos
6	MF	Ilias Koutsoupias	10 May 2001 (age 25)	1	0	(Royal Belgian Football Association) Anderlecht
11	MF	Anastasios Bakasetas (captain)	28 June 1993 (age 33)	84	19	(Cyprus Football Association) APOEL
16	MF	Thanasis Androutsos	6 May 1997 (age 29)	17	1	(Hellenic Football Federation) OFI
19	MF	Konstantinos Karetsas	19 November 2007 (age 19)	15	3	(German Football Association) Borussia Dortmund
21	MF	Christos Zafeiris	23 February 2003 (age 23)	22	0	(Hellenic Football Federation) PAOK
23	MF	Nectarios Triantis	1 May 2003 (age 23)	6	0	(United States Soccer Federation) Minnesota United
	MF	Dimitrios Kourbelis	2 November 1993 (age 33)	58	4	(Hellenic Football Federation) Asteras Tripolis
7	FW	Georgios Masouras	1 January 1994 (age 32)	65	13	(Saudi Arabian Football Federation) Neom
8	FW	Andrews Tetteh	25 May 2001 (age 25)	10	0	(Hellenic Football Federation) Panathinaikos
9	FW	Anastasios Douvikas	2 August 1999 (age 27)	26	3	(Italian Football Federation) Como
10	FW	Christos Tzolis	30 January 2002 (age 24)	39	10	(The Football Association) Arsenal
14	FW	Vangelis Pavlidis	21 November 1998 (age 28)	63	10	(Portuguese Football Federation) Benfica
18	FW	Charalampos Kostoulas	30 May 2007 (age 19)	7	0	(The Football Association) Brighton & Hove Albion
	FW	Fotis Ioannidis	10 January 2000 (age 26)	26	7	(Portuguese Football Federation) Sporting CP
	FW	Alexandros Kyziridis	16 September 2000 (age 26)	2	0	(Turkish Football Federation) Çorum

=== Recent call-ups ===
The following players have also been called up to the Greece squad within the last twelve months.

Pos.	Player	Date of birth (age)	Caps	Goals	Club	Latest call-up
GK	Antonis Tsiftsis	21 July 1999 (age 27)	1	0	(Greece) PAOK	v. Hungary, 31 March 2026
DF	Triantafyllos Tsapras	22 October 2001 (age 25)	0	0	(Greece) Panathinaikos	v. Germany, 4 October 2026
DF	Giannis Michailidis	18 February 2000 (age 26)	5	0	(Greece) PAOK	v. Germany, 4 October 2026^{INJ}
DF	Giorgos Kyriakopoulos	5 February 1996 (age 30)	11	0	(Greece) Panathinaikos	v. Germany, 4 October 2026
DF	Andreas Ntoi	2 February 2003 (age 23)	3	0	(Portugal) Rio Ave	v. Germany, 27 September 2026
MF	Dimitrios Pelkas	26 October 1993 (age 33)	47	5	(Greece) PAOK	v. Germany, 4 October 2026^{INJ}
MF	Christos Mouzakitis	25 December 2006 (age 19)	12	0	(England) Hull City	v. Germany, 4 October 2026
MF	Sotiris Kontouris	24 February 2005 (age 21)	0	0	(Greece) Panathinaikos	v. Italy, 7 June 2026
MF	Giannis Konstantelias	5 March 2003 (age 23)	18	4	(Germany) Borussia Dortmund	v. Paraguay, 27 March 2026^{INJ}
Notes: ^{INJ} = Unavailable due to injury; ^{PRE} = Preliminary squad/standby; ^{RET} = Retired from international football; ^{SUS} = Suspended from the matches in question

== Individual statistics ==
As of 16 November 2026
Players in bold are still active with Greece.

=== Most capped players ===
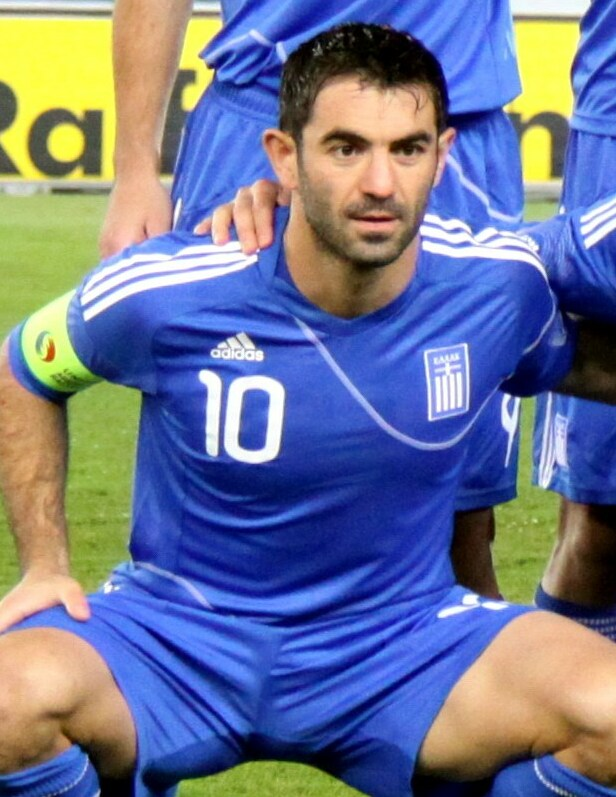
Giorgos Karagounis is Greece's most capped player with 139 appearances.

Rank	Player	Caps	Goals	Position	Career
1	Giorgos Karagounis	139	10	MF	1999–2014
2	Theodoros Zagorakis	120	3	MF	1994–2007
3	Kostas Katsouranis	116	10	MF	2003–2015
4	Vasilis Torosidis	101	10	DF	2007–2019
5	Angelos Basinas	100	7	MF	1999–2009
6	Stratos Apostolakis	96	5	DF	1986–1998
7	Antonios Nikopolidis	90	0	GK	1999–2008
7	Sokratis Papastathopoulos	90	3	DF	2008–2019
9	Angelos Charisteas	88	25	FW	2001–2011
10	**Anastasios Bakasetas**	84	19	MF	2016–present

=== Top goalscorers ===
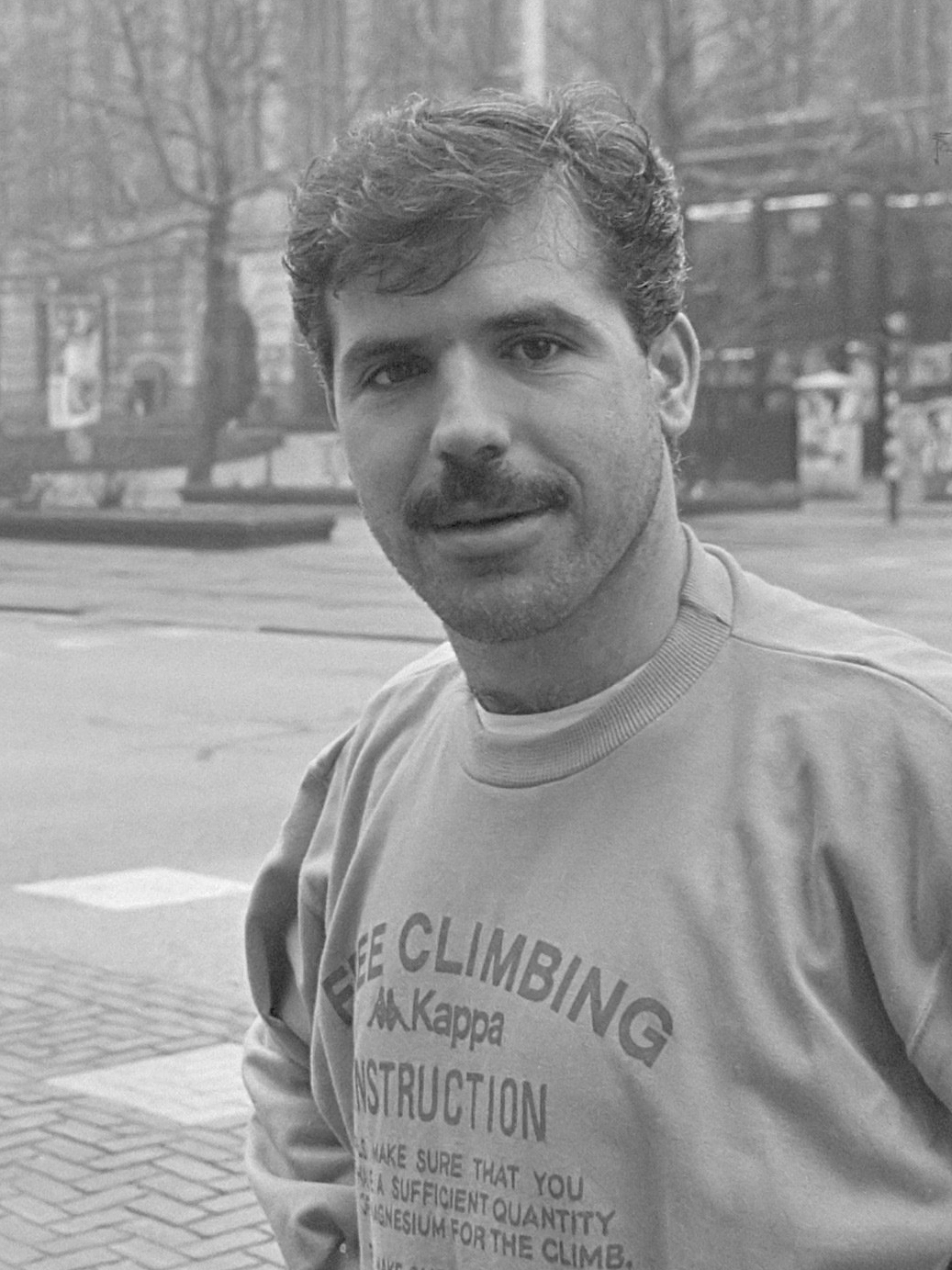
Nikos Anastopoulos is Greece's top scorer with 29 goals.

Rank	Player	Goals	Caps	Ratio	Period
1	Nikos Anastopoulos	29	74	0.39	1977–1988
2	Angelos Charisteas	25	88	0.28	2001–2011
3	Fanis Gekas	24	78	0.31	2005–2014
4	Dimitris Saravakos	22	78	0.28	1982–1994
5	Mimis Papaioannou	21	61	0.34	1963–1978
6	**Anastasios Bakasetas**	19	84	0.23	2016–present
7	Nikos Machlas	18	61	0.3	1993–2002
8	Demis Nikolaidis	17	54	0.31	1995–2004
8	Kostas Mitroglou	17	65	0.26	2009–2019
10	Panagiotis Tsalouchidis	16	76	0.21	1987–1995

=== Captains ===
List of captaincy periods of the various captains throughout the years.

Name	Period	Notes
Georgios Andrianopoulos	1929–1930	
Giorgos Giamalis	1930–1932	
Filippos Kourantis	1932–1935	
Antonis Migiakis	1935–1938	
Kleanthis Maropoulos	1948–1950	
Nikos Pentzaropoulos	1950–1951	
Thanasis Bebis	1951–1954	
Ilias Rosidis	1954–1960	
Kostas Polychroniou	1961–1967	
Giorgos Sideris	1968–1970	
Mimis Domazos	1970–1979	
Giorgos Koudas	1979–1982	European Championship captain (1980); First captain of Greece national football team in a major competition
Anthimos Kapsis	1982	
Nikos Anastopoulos	1983–1988	
Tasos Mitropoulos	1988–1994	World Cup captain (1994); First captain of Greece national football team in a World Cup
Stratos Apostolakis	1994–1998	
Demis Nikolaidis	1998–1999	
Nikos Machlas	1999	
Marinos Ouzounidis	1999–2001	
Theodoros Zagorakis	2001–2007	European Championship winning captain (2004)
Angelos Basinas	2007–2009	European Championship captain (2008)
Giorgos Karagounis	2009–2014	World Cup captain (2010); European Championship captain (2012); World Cup captain (2014)
Dimitris Salpingidis	2014	
Vasilis Torosidis	2014–2019	
Kostas Stafylidis	2019–2020	
Anastasios Bakasetas	2020–	

== Competitive record ==
=== Competitive results ===
These are Greece's results in the major competition that they have participated in. The results in the main tournament have been listed directly in the total column.

As of 16 November 2026

Competition	Total							Home					Away				
Competition	Pld	W	D	L	GF	GA	GD	W	D	L	GF	GA	W	D	L	GF	GA
FIFA World Cup	152	60	36	56	182	211	−29	37	16	18	103	68	23	20	38	79	143
UEFA European Championship	144	65	30	51	199	167	+32	39	5	21	117	71	26	25	30	82	96
UEFA Nations League	32	20	5	7	40	23	+17	10	4	3	27	8	10	1	4	18	15
FIFA Confederations Cup	3	0	1	2	0	4	−4	—	—	—	—	—	0	1	2	0	4
Olympic Games	1	0	0	1	1	2	−1	—	—	—	—	—	0	0	1	1	2
Mediterranean Games	2	2	0	0	6	0	+6	—	—	—	—	—	—	—	—	—	—
Mediterranean Cup	17	4	5	8	15	31	−16	—	—	—	—	—	—	—	—	—	—
Balkan Cup	24	3	4	17	36	76	−40	—	—	—	—	—	—	—	—	—	—
Total	377	154	81	142	479	514	-35	86	25	42	247	147	59	47	75	180	260

=== FIFA World Cup ===
FIFA World Cup record										Qualification record					
Year	Result	Position	Pld	W	D*	L	GF	GA	Squad	Pld	W	D	L	GF	GA
(Uruguay) 1930	Did not enter									Did not enter					
(Italy) 1934	Did not qualify									1	0	0	1	0	4
(France) 1938	Did not qualify									3	2	0	1	5	12
(Brazil) 1950	Did not enter									Did not enter					
(Switzerland) 1954	Did not qualify									4	2	0	2	3	2
(Sweden) 1958	Did not qualify									4	0	1	3	2	9
(Chile) 1962	Did not qualify									4	1	0	3	3	8
(England) 1966	Did not qualify									6	2	1	3	10	14
(Mexico) 1970	Did not qualify									6	2	3	1	13	9
(West Germany) 1974	Did not qualify									4	0	0	4	5	11
(Argentina) 1978	Did not qualify									4	1	1	2	2	6
(Spain) 1982	Did not qualify									8	3	1	4	10	13
(Mexico) 1986	Did not qualify									6	1	2	3	5	10
(Italy) 1990	Did not qualify									6	1	2	3	3	15
(United States) 1994	Group stage	24th	3	0	0	3	0	10	Squad	8	6	2	0	10	2
(France) 1998	Did not qualify									8	4	2	2	11	4
(South Korea) (Japan) 2002	Did not qualify									8	2	1	5	7	17
(Germany) 2006	Did not qualify									12	6	3	3	15	9
(South Africa) 2010	Group stage	25th	3	1	0	2	2	5	Squad	12	7	3	2	21	10
(Brazil) 2014	Round of 16	13th	4	1	2	1	3	5	Squad	12	9	2	1	16	6
(Russia) 2018	Did not qualify									12	5	5	2	18	10
(Qatar) 2022	Did not qualify									8	2	4	2	8	8
(Canada) (Mexico) (United States) 2026	Did not qualify									6	2	1	3	10	12
(Morocco) (Portugal) (Spain) 2030	To be determined									To be determined					
(Saudi Arabia) 2034	To be determined									To be determined					
Total	Round of 16	3/23	10	2	2	6	5	20	—	142	58	34	50	177	191

* Draws include knockout matches decided on penalty kicks.

Greece's World Cup history
First match	Argentina 4–0 Greece (Foxborough, United States; 21 June 1994)
Biggest win	Greece 2–1 Nigeria (Bloemfontein, South Africa; 17 June 2010); Greece 2–1 Ivory Coast (Fortaleza, Brazil; 24 June 2014)
Biggest defeat	Argentina 4–0 Greece (Foxborough, United States; 21 June 1994); Bulgaria 4–0 Greece (Chicago, United States; 26 June 1994)
Best result	Round of 16 (2014)
Worst result	Group stage (1994, 2010)

=== UEFA European Championship ===
UEFA European Championship record										Qualification record					
Year	Result	Position	Pld	W	D*	L	GF	GA	Squad	Pld	W	D	L	GF	GA
(France) 1960	Did not qualify									2	0	1	1	2	8
(Spain) 1964	Did not enter									Did not enter					
(Italy) 1968	Did not qualify									5	2	1	2	7	8
(Belgium) 1972	Did not qualify									6	1	1	4	3	8
(Socialist Federal Republic of Yugoslavia) 1976	Did not qualify									6	2	3	1	12	9
(Italy) 1980	Group stage	8th	3	0	1	2	1	4	Squad	6	3	1	2	13	7
(France) 1984	Did not qualify									8	3	2	3	8	10
(Germany) 1988	Did not qualify									8	4	1	3	12	13
(Sweden) 1992	Did not qualify									8	3	2	3	11	9
(England) 1996	Did not qualify									10	6	0	4	23	9
(Belgium) (Netherlands) 2000	Did not qualify									10	4	3	3	13	8
(Portugal) 2004	Champions	1st	6	4	1	1	7	4	Squad	8	6	0	2	8	4
(Austria) (Switzerland) 2008	Group stage	16th	3	0	0	3	1	5	Squad	12	10	1	1	25	10
(Poland) (Ukraine) 2012	Quarter-finals	7th	4	1	1	2	5	7	Squad	10	7	3	0	14	5
(France) 2016	Did not qualify									10	1	3	6	7	14
(Europe) 2020	Did not qualify									10	4	2	4	12	14
(Germany) 2024	Did not qualify									10	5	2	3	19	8
(England) (Scotland) (Republic of Ireland) (Wales) 2028	To be determined									To be determined					
(Italy) (Turkey) 2032	To be determined									To be determined					
Total	1 Titles	4/17	16	5	3	8	14	20	—	128	61	25	42	189	144

* Draws include knockout matches decided via penalty shoot-out.

Greece's European Championship history
First match	Netherlands 1–0 Greece (Naples, Italy; 11 June 1980)
Biggest win	Greece 2–1 Portugal (Porto, Portugal; 12 June 2004); Greece 1–0 France (Lisbon, Portugal; 25 June 2004); Greece 1–0 (a.e.t.) Czech Republic (Porto, Portugal; 1 July 2004); Greece 1–0 Portugal (Lisbon, Portugal; 4 July 2004); Greece 1–0 Russia (Warsaw, Poland; 16 June 2012)
Biggest defeat	Czechoslovakia 3–1 Greece (Rome, Italy; 14 June 1980); Sweden 2–0 Greece (Salzburg, Austria; 10 June 2008); Germany 4–2 Greece (Gdańsk, Poland; 22 June 2012)
Best result	Champions (2004)
Worst result	Group stage (1980, 2008)

=== UEFA Nations League ===
UEFA Nations League record
Season	Division	Group	Pld	W	D*	L	GF	GA	P/R	RK
2018–19	C	2	6	3	0	3	4	5	Same position	33rd
2020–21	C	3	6	3	3	0	6	1	Same position	37th
2022–23	C	2	6	5	0	1	10	2	▲	34th
2024–25	B	2	8	6	0	2	14	5	▲	15th
2026–27	A	2	6	3	2	1	6	10	Same position	9th
Total			32	20	5	7	40	23	9th	

* Draws include knockout matches decided via penalty shoot-out.

Greece's Nations League history
First match	Greece 1–0 Estonia (Tallinn, Estonia; 8 September 2018)
Biggest win	Greece 3–0 Cyprus (Volos, Greece; 9 June 2022); Greece 3–0 Finland (Piraeus, Greece; 7 September 2024); Greece 3–0 Scotland (Glasgow, Scotland; 23 March 2025)
Biggest defeat	Netherlands 7–0 Greece (Amsterdam, Netherlands; 13 November 2026)
Best result	League A 9th Position
Worst result	League C 37th Position

=== FIFA Confederations Cup ===
FIFA Confederations Cup record
Year	Result	Position	Pld	W	D*	L	GF	GA	Squad
(Saudi Arabia) 1992	Did not qualify								
(Saudi Arabia) 1995	Did not qualify								
(Saudi Arabia) 1997	Did not qualify								
(Mexico) 1999	Did not qualify								
(South Korea) (Japan) 2001	Did not qualify								
(France) 2003	Did not qualify								
(Germany) 2005	Group stage	7th	3	0	1	2	0	4	Squad
(South Africa) 2009	Did not qualify								
(Brazil) 2013	Did not qualify								
(Russia) 2017	Did not qualify								
Total	Group stage	1/10	3	0	1	2	0	4	—

* Draws include knockout matches decided on penalty kicks.

Greece's Confederations Cup history
First match	Brazil 3–0 Greece (Leipzig, Germany; 16 June 2005)
Biggest win	None
Biggest defeat	Brazil 3–0 Greece (Leipzig, Germany; 16 June 2005)
Best result	None
Worst result	Group stage (2005)

=== Olympic Games ===
Olympic Games record
Year	Result	Position	Pld	W	D*	L	GF	GA	Squad
(Greece) 1896	No football tournament was held								
(France) 1900	Did not enter								
(United States) 1904	Did not enter								
(United Kingdom) 1908	Did not enter								
(Sweden) 1912	Did not enter								
(Belgium) 1920	Round of 16	14th	1	0	0	1	0	9	Squad
(France) 1924	Did not enter								
(Netherlands) 1928	Did not enter								
(United States) 1932	No football tournament was held								
(Nazi Germany) 1936	Did not enter								
(United Kingdom) 1948	Did not enter								
(Finland) 1952	Round of 16	21st	1	0	0	1	1	2	Squad
(Australia) 1956	Did not enter								
(Italy) 1960	Did not qualify								
(Japan) 1964	Did not qualify								
(Mexico) 1968	Did not qualify								
(West Germany) 1972	Did not qualify								
(Canada) 1976	Did not qualify								
(Soviet Union) 1980	Did not qualify								
(United States) 1984	Did not qualify								
(South Korea) 1988	Did not qualify								
Since 1992	See Greece national under-23 football team								
Total	Round of 16	2/19	2	0	0	2	1	11	—

* Draws include knockout matches decided on penalty kicks.

== FIFA ranking history ==
Greece's history in the FIFA World Ranking. The table shows the position that Greece held in December of each year (and the current position as of 2026), as well as the highest and lowest positions annually.

Year	Position	Highest	Lowest
1993	34	32	36
1994	28	28	37
1995	34	23	34
1996	35	30	45
1997	42	29	46
1998	53	42	66
1999	34	30	46
2000	42	31	42
2001	57	43	61
2002	48	46	59
2003	30	26	48
2004	18	14	36
2005	16	12	20
2006	16	14	32
2007	11	11	16
2008	20	8	20
2009	13	11	20
2010	11	11	13
2011	14	8	14
2012	13	10	15
2013	12	11	16
2014	24	10	25
2015	41	24	44
2016	42	37	52
2017	47	38	47
2018	43	42	47
2019	54	43	60
2020	53	53	54
2021	55	53	55
2022	51	48	55
2023	47	47	52
2024	39	39	54
2025	46	39	48

- FIFA-ranking yearly averages for Greece
View source data.

== Head-to-head record ==
As of 16 November 2026, after the match against Serbia.

Positive Record Neutral Record Negative Record

Against	P	W	D	L	GF	GA
Albania	13	6	3	4	13	10
Argentina	2	0	0	2	0	6
Armenia	6	4	1	1	7	3
Australia	11	4	3	4	14	14
Austria	13	4	5	4	20	18
Belarus	4	2	1	1	6	2
Belgium	11	3	4	4	11	13
Bolivia	2	1	1	0	2	1
Bosnia and Herzegovina	11	5	5	1	17	9
Brazil	2	0	1	1	0	3
Bulgaria	25	7	6	12	35	43
Cameroon	1	0	0	1	0	3
Canada	4	3	1	0	5	0
Ivory Coast	1	1	0	0	2	1
Chile	1	1	0	0	1	0
Colombia	2	0	0	2	0	5
Costa Rica	1	0	1	0	1	1
Croatia	8	2	4	2	9	10
Cyprus	29	19	6	4	55	27
Czech Republic	5	2	2	1	3	2
Czechoslovakia	5	0	0	5	2	11
Denmark	18	3	4	11	19	40
East Germany	8	2	0	6	7	12
Ecuador	1	0	1	0	1	1
Egypt	10	5	2	3	18	12
El Salvador	2	2	0	0	6	1
England	11	1	2	8	5	27
England (olympic team)	2	1	0	1	5	3
Estonia	6	3	2	1	9	5
Ethiopia	3	3	0	0	7	3
Faroe Islands	4	2	0	2	11	4
Finland	20	11	3	6	34	22
France	10	1	2	7	9	26
France (2nd team)	6	1	2	3	2	4
Georgia	10	7	3	0	17	6
Germany	6	1	1	4	6	12
Gibraltar	4	4	0	0	16	1
Great Britain	1	1	0	0	4	2
Ghana	1	0	1	0	1	1
Honduras	1	1	0	0	2	1
Hungary	23	10	7	6	33	37
Hungary (2nd team)	1	0	0	1	2	4
Iceland	3	2	0	1	4	3
Republic of Ireland	7	6	1	0	10	1
Italy	13	1	4	8	6	23
Italy (2nd team)	7	0	2	5	4	20
Israel	17	9	5	3	26	20
Japan	2	0	1	1	0	1
Kazakhstan	4	4	0	0	12	2
Kosovo	6	3	3	0	7	3
North Korea	1	0	1	0	2	2
South Korea	4	0	1	3	1	6
Latvia	8	5	2	1	13	6
Libya	1	1	0	0	4	0
Liechtenstein	5	4	1	0	8	1
Lithuania	4	2	1	1	4	2
Luxembourg	9	8	0	1	17	3
Malta	12	8	3	1	26	7
Mexico	4	1	2	1	4	4
Moldova	7	6	1	0	13	2
Morocco	1	0	1	0	0	0
Montenegro	2	1	0	1	2	2
Netherlands	13	1	2	10	5	33
New Zealand	1	1	0	0	2	0
Nigeria	4	2	1	1	4	3
Northern Ireland	9	6	0	3	13	11
Norway	9	5	2	2	13	10
Mandatory Palestine	2	2	0	0	4	1
Paraguay	2	0	0	2	0	3
Poland	18	4	4	10	13	30
Portugal	14	5	5	4	18	16
Qatar	1	1	0	0	1	0
Romania	35	7	10	18	36	70
Russia	11	2	5	4	10	14
San Marino	2	2	0	0	6	0
Saudi Arabia	3	1	1	1	6	4
Scotland	6	3	0	3	8	7
Serbia	4	3	0	1	4	3
Slovakia	6	4	1	1	10	5
Slovenia	7	3	4	0	11	3
Spain	12	1	3	8	11	21
Spain (2nd team)	2	1	0	1	3	7
Senegal	1	0	0	1	0	2
Soviet Union	11	2	0	9	4	25
Sweden	9	3	4	2	12	13
Switzerland	15	2	4	9	12	20
Syria	2	2	0	0	12	0
Turkey	13	3	3	8	11	18
Ukraine	6	2	2	2	3	4
United States	1	0	1	0	1	1
Wales	2	1	0	1	3	4
West Germany	6	0	3	3	5	11
FR Yugoslavia	2	0	1	1	1	3
Yugoslavia	20	2	2	16	18	61
Total	672	257	160	255	843	916

The game against Great Britain's Olympic Team (1952) was recognized as an official game of the Greece National Team by the Hellenic Football Federation.

== Honours ==
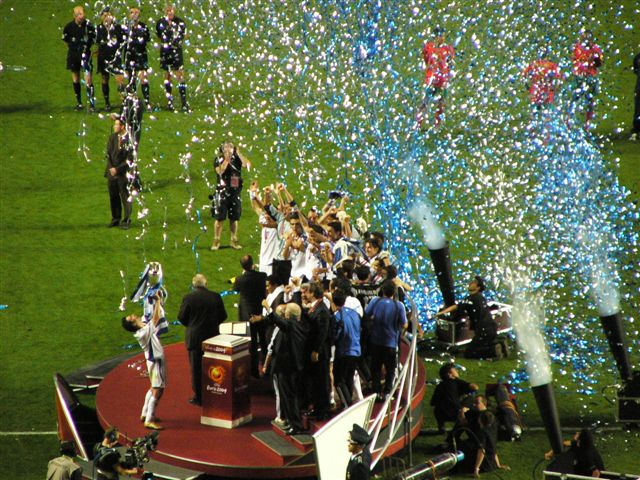
The Greece national team at the UEFA Euro 2004 trophy ceremony

=== Continental ===
- UEFA European Championship
  - (gold) Champions: 2004

=== Regional ===
- Mediterranean Games
  - (gold) Gold medal: 1951, 1991
  - (bronze) Bronze medal: 1997
- Mediterranean Cup
  - (silver) Runners-up: 1950–53
- Balkan Cup
  - (silver) Runners-up: 1934–35
  - (bronze) Third place: 1929–31, 1935, 1936

=== Friendly ===
- Cyprus International Football Tournament
  - (gold) Champions: 1999, 2006
- Sir Stanley Matthews Cup
  - (silver) Runners-up: 1988

=== Awards ===
- Laureus World Team of the Year: 2005
- World Soccer Team of the Year: 2004
- FIFA Confederations Cup Fair Play Award: 2005

=== Summary ===
Competition	1st place, gold medalist(s)	2nd place, silver medalist(s)	3rd place, bronze medalist(s)	Total
UEFA European Championship	1	0	0	1
Total	1	0	0	1

== See also ==
- List of Greece international footballers
- Greece national under-23 football team (Greece Olympic team)
- Greece national under-21 football team
- Greece national under-20 football team
- Greece national under-19 football team
- Greece national under-17 football team

== Notes ==
Achievements
Preceded by 2000 France	European Champions; 2004 (First title)	Succeeded by 2008 Spain
Awards
Preceded by England rugby union	Laureus World Team of the Year; 2005	Succeeded by Renault Formula One Team
