= Turkey national under-20 football team =

National under-20 association football team representing Turkey

Turkey Under-20
- Nickname: Genç Milliler
- Association: Turkish Football Federation (TFF)
- Confederation: UEFA (Europe)
- Head coach: Uğur İnceman
- Most caps: Enver Cenk Şahin (19)
- Top scorer: Enver Cenk Şahin (5)
- FIFA code: TUR
First colours	Second colours

FIFA U-20 World Cup
- Appearances: 3 (first in 1993)
- Best result: Round of 16 (2005, 2013)

The Turkey national under-20 football team (Turkey national under-19 football team) is the national under-20 football team of Turkey and is controlled by the Turkish Football Federation.

The team competes in the FIFA U-20 World Cup, which is held every two years. To qualify for this tournament (which is held in odd years), the team must finish in the top five of the UEFA European Under-19 Football Championship from the previous year (unless acting as host).

== Competitive record ==
=== FIFA World Youth Championship/U-20 World Cup Record ===
Year	Result	GP	W	D*	L	GS	GA
(Tunisia) 1977	Did not qualify						
(Japan) 1979	Did not qualify						
(Australia) 1981	Did not qualify						
(Mexico) 1983	Did not qualify						
(Soviet Union) 1985	Did not qualify						
(Chile) 1987	Did not qualify						
(Saudi Arabia) 1989	Did not qualify						
(Portugal) 1991	Did not qualify						
(Australia) 1993	Group stage	3	0	1	2	1	8
(Qatar) 1995	Did not qualify						
(Malaysia) 1997	Did not qualify						
(Nigeria) 1999	Did not qualify						
(Argentina) 2001	Did not qualify						
(United Arab Emirates) 2003	Did not qualify						
(Netherlands) 2005	Round of 16	4	1	1	2	4	7
(Canada) 2007	Did not qualify						
(Egypt) 2009	Did not qualify						
(Colombia) 2011	Did not qualify						
(Turkey) 2013	Round of 16	4	2	0	2	6	6
(New Zealand) 2015	Did not qualify						
(South Korea) 2017	Did not qualify						
(Poland) 2019	Did not qualify						
(Argentina) 2023	Did not qualify						
(Chile) 2025	Did not qualify						
(Azerbaijan) (Uzbekistan) 2027	Did not qualify						
(Armenia) (Georgia (country)) 2029	To be determined						
Total	3/25	11	3	2	6	11	21

*Red border colour indicates tournament was held on home soil.

=== UEFA European Under-19 Championship ===
UEFA European Under-19 Championship

2023 UEFA European Under-19 Championship

=== Mediterranean Games ===
Turkey B

Football at the Mediterranean Games
Year	Rank	GP	W	D	L	GS	GA
(Egypt) 1951	-	0	0	0	0	0	0
(Spain) 1955	-	0	0	0	0	0	0
(Lebanon) 1959	2	2	1	1	0	7	4
(Italy) 1963	2	5	3	1	1	12	7
(Tunisia) 1967	4	5	2	1	2	5	7
(Turkey) 1971	3	4	3	1	0	4	1
(Algeria) 1975	7	4	0	2	2	1	5
(Socialist Federal Republic of Yugoslavia) 1979	5	3	1	1	1	2	2
(Morocco) 1983	2	4	2	0	2	4	5
(Syria) 1987	3	5	3	0	2	6	2
1991 – present	See Turkey national under-20 team						
Total	8/10	32	15	7	10	41	33

Overall record as of September 29, 2013: 28 matches played, 13 wins, 10 draws, 5 losses.

=== Toulon Tournament ===
- 2003 Toulon Tournament
- 2008 Toulon Tournament
- 2012 Toulon Tournament
- 2018 Toulon Tournament

=== Under-20 Four Nations Tournament ===
- 2014 Under-20 Four Nations Tournament

== 1993 FIFA World Youth Championship ==
=== Group C ===
Team	Pts	Pld	W	D	L	GF	GA	GD
England	5	3	2	1	0	3	1	+2
United States	3	3	1	1	1	8	3	+5
South Korea	3	3	0	3	0	4	4	0
Turkey	1	3	0	1	2	1	8	−7

7 March 1993
18:15

South Korea	1–1	England
Watson 32' (o.g.)	(Report)	Pearce 82'

Olympic Park Stadium, Melbourne
Attendance: 15,732
Referee: Hellmut Krug (Germany)

7 March 1993
20:30

Turkey	0–6	United States
	(Report)	Baba 22'; Joseph 26', 72'; Faklaris 28', 46', 90'

Olympic Park Stadium, Melbourne
Attendance: 15,732
Referee: Jorge Nieves (Uruguay)

9 March 1993
18:15

England	1–0	United States
Bart-Williams 69'	(Report)

Olympic Park Stadium, Melbourne
Attendance: 9,274
Referee: Jorge Nieves (Uruguay)

9 March 1993
20:30

South Korea	1–1	Turkey
Cho 48'	(Report)	Reçber 85'

Olympic Park Stadium, Melbourne
Attendance: 9,274
Referee: Dodji Mawuk Hounnake Kouassi (Togo)

11 March 1993
18:15

England	1–0	Turkey
Joachim 12'	(Report)

Olympic Park Stadium, Melbourne
Attendance: 12,972
Referee: Jorge Nieves (Uruguay)

11 March 1993
20:30

South Korea	2–2	United States
Lee 39', 52'	(Report)	Kelly 37'; Zavagnin 78'

Olympic Park Stadium, Melbourne
Attendance: 12,972
Referee: Hellmut Krug (Germany)

== 2005 FIFA World Youth Championship ==
=== Group B ===
Team	Pts	Pld	W	D	L	GF	GA	GD
China	9	3	3	0	0	9	4	+5
Ukraine	4	3	1	1	1	7	6	+1
Turkey	4	3	1	1	1	4	4	0
Panama	0	3	0	0	3	2	8	−6

11 June 2005
17:30

Turkey	1–2	China
Gökhan 84'	(Report)	Tan Wangsong 22'; Zhao Xuri 90+5'

Galgenwaard Stadion, Utrecht
Attendance: 10,000
Referee: Eric Braamhaar (Netherlands)

11 June 2005
20:30

Ukraine	3–1	Panama
Aliev 20' (pen.), 22'; Feschuk 32'	(Report)	Arzhanov 26' (o.g.)

Galgenwaard Stadion, Utrecht
Attendance: 2,500
Referee: Khalil Al Ghamdi (Saudi Arabia)

14 June 2005
17:30

China	3–2	Ukraine
Zhu Ting 31'; Chen Tao 66' (pen.); Cui Peng 75'	(Report)	Vorobei 19'; Aliev 70' (pen.)

Galgenwaard Stadion, Utrecht
Attendance: 2,300
Referee: Rodolfo Sibrian (El Salvador)

15 June 2005
20:30

Panama	0–1	Turkey
	(Report)	Gökhan 24'

Galgenwaard Stadion, Utrecht
Attendance: 6,100
Referee: Jorge Larrionda (Uruguay)

17 June 2005
20:30

Turkey	2–2	Ukraine
Sezer 8' (pen.), 53'	(Report)	Aliev 5', 19'

De Vijverberg, Doetinchem
Attendance: 9,500
Referee: Luis Medina Cantalejo (Spain)

17 June 2005
20:30

China	4–1	Panama
Zhou Haibin 6'; Gao Lin 40'; Hao Junmin 51'; Lu Lin 78'	(Report)	Venegas 37'

Galgenwaard Stadion, Utrecht
Attendance: 4,000
Referee: Essam Abd El Fatah (Egypt)

=== Round of 16 ===
22 June 2005
20:30

Spain	3–0	Turkey
Juanfran 28', 36'; Robusté 69'	(Report)

Univé Stadion, Emmen
Attendance: 8,400
Referee: Terje Hauge (Norway)

== 2013 FIFA U-20 World Cup ==
=== Group C ===
Pos	Team	Pld	W	D	L	GF	GA	GD	Pts	Group stage result
1	Colombia	3	2	1	0	5	1	+4	7	Advance to knockout stage
2	Turkey (H)	3	2	0	1	5	2	+3	6	Advance to knockout stage
3	El Salvador	3	1	0	2	2	7	−5	3	
4	Australia	3	0	1	2	3	5	−2	1	

(H) Hosts
22 June 2013
18:00

Colombia	1–1	Australia
Córdoba 78'	Report	De Silva 46'

Hüseyin Avni Aker Stadium, Trabzon
Attendance: 4,662
Referee: Milorad Mažić (Serbia)

22 June 2013
21:00

Turkey	3–0	El Salvador
Uçan 9'; Şahin 46', 64'	Report

Hüseyin Avni Aker Stadium, Trabzon
Attendance: 4,662
Referee: Sandro Ricci (Brazil)

25 June 2013
18:00

Australia	1–2	El Salvador
Brillante 9'	Report	Coca 17'; Peña 40'

Yeni Şehir Stadium, Rize
Attendance: 13,015
Referee: Stéphane Lannoy (France)

25 June 2013
21:00

Turkey	0–1	Colombia
	Report	Quintero 52'

Yeni Şehir Stadium, Rize
Attendance: 13,015
Referee: Noumandiez Doué (Ivory Coast)

28 June 2013
21:00

Australia	1–2	Turkey
Maclaren 52'	Report	Çalhanoğlu 54'; Yokuşlu 87'

Hüseyin Avni Aker Stadium, Trabzon
Attendance: 11,286
Referee: Roberto García (Mexico)

28 June 2013
21:00

El Salvador	0–3	Colombia
	Report	Rentería 21'; Córdoba 25' (pen.); Quintero 90+1'

Kamil Ocak Stadium, Gaziantep
Attendance: 2,000
Referee: Néant Alioum (Cameroon)

=== Round of 16 ===
2 July 2013
21:00

France	4–1	Turkey
Kondogbia 18'; Bahebeck 34'; Sanogo 68'; Veretout 74'	Report	Bakış 77'

Kamil Ocak Stadium, Gaziantep
Attendance: 14,800
Referee: Alberto Undiano Mallenco (Spain)

== Current squad ==
=== Past squads ===
FIFA World Youth Championship/U-20 World Cup squads

- 1993 FIFA World Youth Championship
- 2005 FIFA World Youth Championship
- 2013 FIFA U-20 World Cup

== Head-to-head record ==
The following table shows Turkey's head-to-head record in the FIFA U-20 World Cup.

Opponent	Pld	W	D	L	GF	GA	GD	Win %
Australia	1	1	0	0	2	1	+1	100.00
China	1	0	0	1	1	2	−1	0.00
Colombia	1	0	0	1	0	1	−1	0.00
El Salvador	1	1	0	0	3	0	+3	100.00
England	1	0	0	1	0	1	−1	0.00
France	1	0	0	1	1	4	−3	0.00
Panama	1	1	0	0	1	0	+1	100.00
South Korea	1	0	1	0	1	1	+0	0.00
Spain	1	0	0	1	0	3	−3	0.00
Ukraine	1	0	1	0	2	2	+0	0.00
United States	1	0	0	1	0	6	−6	0.00
Total	11	3	2	6	11	21	−10	27.27

== See also ==
Under 20 Elite League

- Turkey national football team
- Turkey national under-21 football team
- Turkey national under-20 football team
- Turkey national under-19 football team
- Turkey national under-17 football team
- Turkey national youth football team
