= Algeria national football team all-time record =

The Algeria national football team has played teams from every confederation except OFC. They played their first international on January 6, 1963, in Algiers against Bulgaria, winning 2–1. The team they have played the most is Tunisia, with a total of 41 games played. Their biggest win has been by 15 goals against South Yemen in 1973.

== Competition records ==
=== FIFA World Cup record ===
FIFA World Cup record
Appearances : 4
FIFA World Cup finals									FIFA World Cup qualification					
Year	Round	Result	Pld	W	D	L	GF	GA	Pld	W	D	L	GF	GA
(Uruguay) 1930	Part of France								Part of France					
(Italy) 1934	Part of France								Part of France					
(France) 1938	Part of France								Part of France					
(Brazil) 1950	Part of France								Part of France					
(Switzerland) 1954	Part of France								Part of France					
(Sweden) 1958	Part of France								Part of France					
(Chile) 1962	Part of France								Part of France					
(England) 1966	Did not enter								Did not enter					
(Mexico) 1970	Did not qualify								2	0	1	1	1	2
(West Germany) 1974	Did not qualify								2	1	0	1	2	5
(Argentina) 1978	Did not qualify								4	1	2	1	2	3
(Spain) 1982	Group stage	13th	3	2	0	1	5	5	8	5	2	1	16	6
(Mexico) 1986	Group stage	22nd	3	0	1	2	1	5	6	5	1	0	13	3
(Italy) 1990	Did not qualify								6	3	2	1	6	2
(United States) 1994	Did not qualify								8	2	3	3	8	11
(France) 1998	Did not qualify								2	1	0	1	2	3
(South Korea) (Japan) 2002	Did not qualify								10	3	3	4	13	14
(Germany) 2006	Did not qualify								12	3	5	4	15	15
(South Africa) 2010	Group stage	28th	3	0	1	2	0	2	13	8	2	3	17	8
(Brazil) 2014	Round of 16	14th	4	1	1	2	7	7	8	6	0	2	16	7
(Russia) 2018	Did not qualify								8	2	2	4	15	12
(Qatar) 2022	To be determined								To be determined					
(Canada) (Mexico) (United States) 2026	To be determined								To be determined					
Total	Round of 16	4/21	13	3	3	7	13	19	89	40	23	26	126	91

=== Olympic Games record ===
Olympic Games
Appearances: 2
Year	Round	Position	Pld	W	D	L	GF	GA
1908-1960	Part of France							
(Japan) 1964	Did not enter							
(Mexico) 1968	Did not qualify							
(West Germany) 1972	Did not qualify							
(Canada) 1976	Did not qualify							
(Soviet Union) 1980	Quarter-finals	8th	4	1	1	2	4	5
(United States) 1984	Did not qualify							
(South Korea) 1988	Did not qualify							
(Spain) 1992	Did not qualify							
(United States) 1996	Did not qualify							
(Australia) 2000	Did not qualify							
(Greece) 2004	Did not qualify							
(China) 2008	Did not qualify							
(United Kingdom) 2012	Did not qualify							
(Brazil) 2016	Group stage	14th	3	0	1	2	4	6
(Japan) 2020	Did not qualify							
(France) 2024	To be determined							
Total	Quarter-finals	2/26	7	1	2	4	8	11

- Prior to the Barcelona 1992 campaign, the Football at the Summer Olympics was open to full senior national teams.

=== Africa Cup of Nations record ===
Africa Cup of Nations
Appearances: 18
Year	Round	Position	Pld	W	D	L	GF	GA
(Sudan) 1957	Part of France							
(Egypt) 1959	Part of France							
(Ethiopia) 1962	Part of France							
(Ghana) 1963	Did not enter							
(Tunisia) 1965	Did not enter							
(Ethiopia) 1968	Group stage	6th	3	1	0	2	5	6
(Sudan) 1970	Did not qualify							
(Cameroon) 1972	Did not qualify							
(Egypt) 1974	Did not qualify							
(Ethiopia) 1976	Did not qualify							
(Ghana) 1978	Did not qualify							
(Nigeria) 1980	Runners-up	2nd	5	2	2	1	6	7
(Libya) 1982	Fourth place	4th	5	2	1	2	5	6
(Ivory Coast) 1984	Third place	3rd	5	3	2	0	8	1
(Egypt) 1986	Group stage	6th	3	0	2	1	2	3
(Morocco) 1988	Third place	3rd	5	1	3	1	4	4
(Algeria) 1990	Champions	1st	5	5	0	0	13	2
(Senegal) 1992	Group stage	10th	2	0	1	1	1	4
(Tunisia) 1994	Disqualified after qualification							
(South Africa) 1996	Quarter-finals	5th	4	2	1	1	5	3
(Burkina Faso) 1998	Group stage	15th	3	0	0	3	2	5
(Ghana) (Nigeria) 2000	Quarter-finals	6th	4	1	2	1	5	4
(Mali) 2002	Group stage	15th	3	0	1	2	2	5
(Tunisia) 2004	Quarter-finals	8th	4	1	1	2	5	7
(Egypt) 2006	Did not qualify							
(Ghana) 2008	Did not qualify							
(Angola) 2010	Fourth place	4th	6	2	1	3	4	10
(Equatorial Guinea) (Gabon) 2012	Did not qualify							
(South Africa) 2013	Group stage	13th	3	0	1	2	2	5
(Equatorial Guinea) 2015	Quarter-finals	6th	4	2	0	2	6	5
(Gabon) 2017	Group stage	10th	3	0	2	1	5	6
(Egypt) 2019	Champions	1st	7	6	1	0	13	2
(Cameroon) 2021	Qualified							
(Ivory Coast) 2023	To be determined							
(Guinea) 2025	To be determined							
Total	2 Titles	18/32	74	28	21	25	93	83

=== African Games record ===
African Games
Appearances: 7
Year	Round	Position	Pld	W	D	L	GF	GA
(Republic of the Congo) 1965	Fourth place	4th	5	2	0	3	6	5
(Nigeria) 1973	Group stage	5th	3	1	1	1	6	6
(Algeria) 1978	Gold medal	1st	5	4	1	0	9	2
(Kenya) 1987	Disqualified ^{1}							
(Egypt) 1991	Did not qualify							
(Zimbabwe) 1995	Group stage	6th	3	1	0	2	2	4
(South Africa) 1999	Group stage	6th	3	1	0	2	2	4
(Nigeria) 2003	Group stage	5th	3	1	1	1	3	4
(Algeria) 2007	Group stage	5th	3	1	1	1	4	4
(Mozambique) 2011	Did not qualify							
(Republic of the Congo) 2015	Did not enter							
(Morocco) 2019	Did not qualify							
(Ghana) 2023	To be determined							
Total	Gold Medal	7/11	25	11	4	10	32	29

- Prior to the Cairo 1991 campaign, the Football at the African Games was open to full senior national teams.
- ^1Algeria withdrew in protest at CAF's decision to order a replay of the first leg against Tunisia; CAF had made this decision following Tunisia's protest that Algeria had fielded two ineligible players.

=== African Nations Championship record ===
African Nations Championship
Appearances: 1
Year	Round	Position	Pld	W	D	L	GF	GA
(Ivory Coast) 2009	Did not qualify							
(Sudan) 2011	Fourth place	4th	6	2	3	1	7	4
(South Africa) 2014	Did not enter							
(Rwanda) 2016	Disqualified ^{1}							
(Morocco) 2018	Did not qualify							
(Cameroon) 2020	Did not qualify							
(Algeria) 2022	Qualified							
Total	Fourth Place	1/5	6	2	3	1	7	4

^1 The CAF disqualified Algeria from the CHAN 2016 because the team have abandoned the qualifiers of the previous edition, the CHAN 2014.

=== Mediterranean Games Record ===
from 1991 U21 teams.

Mediterranean Games
Appearances: 11
Year	Round	Position	Pld	W	D	L	GF	GA
(Egypt) 1951	Part of France							
(Spain) 1955	Part of France							
(Lebanon) 1959	Part of France							
(Italy) 1963	Did not enter							
(Tunisia) 1967	Group stage	6th	3	1	0	2	4	6
(Turkey) 1971	Did not qualify							
(Algeria) 1975^{1}	Gold medal	1st	6	6	0	0	14	3
(Socialist Federal Republic of Yugoslavia) 1979	Bronze medal	3rd	5	2	2	1	7	6
(Morocco) 1983	Group stage	6th	2	1	0	1	3	3
(Syria) 1987^{1}	Group stage	8th	3	0	0	3	1	7
(Greece) 1991	Group stage	8th	2	0	0	2	1	5
(France) 1993	Silver medal	2nd	4	2	1	1	6	4
(Italy) 1997	Group stage	8th	3	0	3	0	4	4
(Tunisia) 2001	Group stage	8th	2	0	0	2	3	7
(Spain) 2005	Quarter-finals	6th	3	1	1	1	3	4
(Italy) 2009	Did not qualify							
(Turkey) 2013	Did not qualify							
(Spain) 2018	Group stage	6th	3	1	0	2	3	5
(Algeria) 2021	Qualified							
Total	Gold Medal	11/18	36	14	7	15	49	54

- Prior to the Athens 1991 campaign, the Football at the Mediterranean Games was open to full senior national teams.
- ^1 Algeria participated with the national B team in 1975 and 1987.

=== Arab Nations Cup record ===
Arab Nations Cup
Appearances: 2
Year	Round	Position	Pld	W	D	L	GF	GA
(Lebanon) 1963	Did not enter							
(Kuwait) 1964	Did not enter							
(Iraq) 1966	Did not enter							
(Saudi Arabia) 1985	Did not enter							
(Jordan) 1988	Group stage ^{1}	5th	4	1	2	1	3	3
(Syria) 1992	Did not enter							
(Qatar) 1998	Group stage ^{2}	10th	2	0	1	1	0	3
(Kuwait) 2002	Did not enter							
(Saudi Arabia) 2012	Did not enter							
Total	Group Stage	2/9	6	1	3	2	3	6

1. Algeria participated with the national University team
2. Algeria participated with the national U-23 team

=== Pan Arab Games record ===
Pan Arab Games
Appearances: 1
Year	Round	Position	Pld	W	D	L	GF	GA
(Egypt) 1953	Part of France							
(Lebanon) 1957	Part of France							
(Morocco) 1961	Part of France							
(United Arab Republic) 1965	Did not enter							
(Syria) 1976	Did not enter							
(Morocco) 1985	Bronze medal ^{1}	3rd	5	2	0	3	4	6
(Syria) 1992	Did not enter							
(Lebanon) 1997	Did not enter							
(Jordan) 1999	Withdrew							
(Algeria) 2004	No tournament							
(Egypt) 2007	Did not enter							
(Qatar) 2011	Did not enter							
Total	Bronze Medal	1/11	5	2	0	3	4	6

1. Algeria participated with the B team

=== Other records ===
Year	Position
(Greece) 1969 World military Cup	2nd
(Iraq) 1972 Palestine Cup of Nations	3rd
(Libya) 1973 Palestine Cup of Nations	3rd
(Iran) 1982 Vahdat Cup	2nd
(Algeria) (Iran) 1991 Afro-Asian Cup of Nations	1st
(Mali) 2004 African Military cup	3rd
(Germany) 2005 World military Cup	2nd
(Uganda) 2008 African Military cup	2nd
(Brazil) 2011 World military Cup	1st
(South Korea) 2015 World military Cup	1st
Total	3 titles

== Head-to-head record ==
Key
Positive balance (more Wins)
Neutral balance (Wins = Losses)
Negative balance (more Losses)

Last match updated was against Niger on 6 October 2026.

CAF:

Flag	Nationality	From	To	P	W	D	L	%	GF	GA	GD
(Angola)	Angola	1985	2024	10	2	7	1	20%	20	13	+7
(Benin)	Benin	1983	2019	11	8	2	1	72.73%	25	8	+17
(Botswana)	Botswana	2019	2025	3	3	0	0	100%	9	1	+8
(Burkina Faso)	Burkina Faso	1967	2025	24	10	8	6	41.67%	38	22	+16
(Burundi)	Burundi	1992	2026	7	4	2	1	57.14%	13	5	+8
(Cameroon)	Cameroon	1984	2022	11	2	4	5	18.18%	12	13	-1
(Cape Verde)	Cape Verde	2000	2023	5	3	2	1	60%	13	6	+7
(Central African Republic)	Central African Republic	2010	2017	3	2	0	1	66.67%	5	2	+3
(Chad)	Chad	2002	2003	2	1	1	0	50%	4	1	+3
(Republic of the Congo)	Congo	1978	1992	2	1	1	0	50%	4	1	+3
(Djibouti)	Djibouti	2021	2021	2	2	0	0	100%	12	0	+12
(Democratic Republic of the Congo)	DR Congo	1965	2026	6	3	4	0	50%	9	4	+5
(Ivory Coast)	Ivory Coast	1965	2022	23	7	8	8	30.43%	24	29	-5
(Egypt)	Egypt	1963	2023	29	10	12	7	34.48%	34	34	0
(Ethiopia)	Ethiopia	1968	2016	7	4	2	1	57.14%	15	6	+9
(Equatorial Guinea)	Equatorial Guinea	2022	2025	4	2	1	1	50%	5	2	+3
(Gabon)	Gabon	1995	2011	6	1	2	4	16.67%	9	14	-5
(The Gambia)	Gambia	2006	2025	10	5	3	2	50%	14	7	+7
(Ghana)	Ghana	1973	2022	11	4	2	5	36.36%	13	10	+3
(Guinea)	Guinea	1968	2025	18	6	5	7	40%	25	25	+0
(Guinea-Bissau)	Guinea-Bissau	1992	1993	2	2	0	0	100%	7	2	+5
(Kenya)	Kenya	1977	2019	8	4	1	3	50%	13	7	+6
(Lesotho)	Lesotho	2015	2016	2	2	0	0	100%	9	1	+8
(Liberia)	Liberia	1999	2024	7	4	3	0	57.14%	18	5	+13
(Libya)	Libya	1967	2012	22	16	3	3	72.73%	40	10	+30
(Madagascar)	Madagascar	1965	2003	2	2	0	0	100%	4	1	+3
(Malawi)	Malawi	1978	2014	7	4	1	2	57.14%	13	6	+7
(Mali)	Mali	1965	2022	27	14	3	10	51.85%	41	25	+16
(Mauritania)	Mauritania	1985	2024	7	5	1	1	71.43%	19	4	+15
(Morocco)	Morocco	1965	2021	33	11	11	11	33.33%	33	33	0
(Mozambique)	Mozambique	1986	2025	4	3	0	1	75%	11	3	+8
(Namibia)	Namibia	2001	2003	4	4	0	0	100%	7	0	+7
(Niger)	Niger	1981	2026	11	9	1	1	81.82%	29	4	+25
(Nigeria)	Nigeria	1973	2025	24	11	4	9	45.83%	29	26	+3
(Rwanda)	Rwanda	2004	2025	7	5	2	0	71.43%	12	2	+10
(Senegal)	Senegal	1977	2023	22	12	7	3	54.55%	34	19	+15
(Seychelles)	Seychelles	2015	2016	2	2	0	0	100%	6	0	+6
(Sierra Leone)	Sierra Leone	1980	2022	6	2	3	1	33.33%	7	4	+3
(Somalia)	Somalia	2023	2025	2	2	0	0	100%	6	1	+5
(South Africa)	South Africa	1996	2025	7	1	5	1	14.29%	9	8	+1
(Sudan)	Sudan	1980	2025	11	5	5	1	45.45%	17	7	+10
(Tanzania)	Tanzania	1973	2023	11	6	4	1	54.55%	25	10	+15
(Togo)	Togo	1992	2024	8	5	1	2	62.5%	15	5	+10
(Tunisia)	Tunisia	1963	2023	50	20	16	14	40%	48	38	+10
(Uganda)	Uganda	1968	2025	17	10	4	3	58.82%	30	15	+15
(Zambia)	Zambia	1977	2026	16	8	3	5	50%	21	13	+8
(Zimbabwe)	Zimbabwe	1989	2025	9	4	4	1	44.44%	19	12	+7

Rest of the World:

Flag	Nationality	From	To	P	W	D	L	%	GF	GA	GD
(Albania)	Albania	1976	1976	1	0	0	1	0%	0	3	-3
(Argentina)	Argentina	2007	2026	2	0	0	2	0%	3	7	-4
(Armenia)	Armenia	2014	2014	1	1	0	0	100%	3	1	+2
(Austria)	Austria	1982	2026	2	0	1	1	0%	3	5	-2
(Bahrain)	Bahrain	1988	2025	3	1	2	0	33.33%	5	1	+4
(Belgium)	Belgium	2002	2014	3	0	1	2	0%	2	5	-3
(Brazil)	Brazil	1965	2007	4	0	0	4	0%	0	8	-8
(Bolivia)	Bolivia	2024	2024	1	1	0	0	100%	3	2	+1
(Bosnia and Herzegovina)	Bosnia and Herzegovina	2012	2012	1	0	0	1	0%	0	1	-1
(Bulgaria)	Bulgaria	1963	2000	6	1	2	3	16.67%	6	9	-3
(Canada)	Canada	1984	1984	1	1	0	0	100%	1	0	+1
(Chile)	Chile	1982	1982	1	1	0	0	100%	3	2	+1
(China)	China PR	1964	2004	4	2	1	1	50%	6	2	+4
(Colombia)	Colombia	2019	2019	1	1	0	0	100%	3	0	+3
(Cuba)	Cuba	1974	1974	1	0	0	1	0%	0	1	-1
(Czechoslovakia)	Czechoslovakia †	1964	1964	2	1	0	1	50%	4	4	0
(Denmark)	Denmark	1989	1989	1	0	1	0	0%	0	0	0
(England)	England	2010	2010	1	0	1	0	0%	0	0	0
(Finland)	Finland	1989	1989	1	1	0	0	100%	2	0	+2
(France)	France	2001	2001	1	0	0	1	0%	1	4	-3
(Germany)	Germany *	1964	2014	3	2	0	1	50%	5	3	+2
(East Germany)	East Germany †	1974	1985	4	0	1	3	0%	4	14	-10
(Greece)	Greece	1975	1979	2	2	0	0	100%	7	1	+6
(Guatemala)	Guatemala	2026	2026	1	1	0	0	100%	7	0	+7
(Hungary)	Hungary	1967	1985	2	0	0	2	0%	1	4	-3
(Iran)	Iran	1991	2022	4	2	0	2	50%	5	5	0
(Iraq)	Iraq	1972	2025	8	1	4	3	12.5%	4	8	-4
(Indonesia)	Indonesia	1986	1986	1	1	0	0	100%	2	1	+1
(Italy)	Italy	1989	1989	1	0	0	1	0%	0	1	-1
(Jordan)	Jordan	1986	2026	3	1	1	1	33.33%	4	4	0
(Netherlands)	Netherlands	2026	2026	1	1	0	0	100%	1	0	+1
(South Korea)	South Korea	1985	2014	2	1	0	1	50%	4	4	0
(North Korea)	North Korea	1969	1969	1	0	0	1	0%	1	3	-2
(Kuwait)	Kuwait	1987	1988	2	1	0	1	50%	1	2	-1
(Lebanon)	Lebanon	1974	2021	3	2	1	0	66.67%	8	3	+5
(Luxembourg)	Luxembourg	2010	2010	1	0	1	0	0%	0	0	0
(Malaysia)	Malaysia	1986	1986	1	0	1	0	0%	2	2	0
(Malta)	Malta	1971	1989	3	2	1	0	66.67%	3	1	+2
(Mexico)	Mexico	1985	2020	2	0	1	1	0%	2	4	-2
(Northern Ireland)	Northern Ireland	1986	1986	1	0	1	0	0%	1	1	0
(Oman)	Oman	1996	2015	3	3	0	0	100%	6	1	+5
(Qatar)	Qatar	1972	2021	6	4	1	1	66.67%	9	4	+5
(Palestine)	Palestine	1972	1972	1	1	0	0	100%	2	0	+2
(Peru)	Peru	1982	1982	1	0	1	0	0%	1	1	0
(Poland)	Poland	1979	1980	2	0	0	2	0%	1	6	-5
(Portugal)	Portugal	2018	2018	1	0	0	1	0%	0	3	-3
(Republic of Ireland)	Republic of Ireland	1982	2010	2	1	0	1	50%	2	3	-1
(Romania)	Romania	1984	2014	5	2	2	1	40%	8	7	+1
(Russia)	Russia	2014	2014	1	0	1	0	0%	1	1	0
(Saudi Arabia)	Saudi Arabia	1976	2025	5	2	2	1	40%	8	6	+2
(Slovakia)	Slovakia	2001	2001	1	0	1	0	0%	1	1	0
(Slovenia)	Slovenia	2010	2014	2	1	0	1	50%	2	1	+1
(Soviet Union)	Soviet Union †	1964	1964	1	0	1	0	0%	2	2	0
(Spain)	Spain	1986	1986	1	0	0	1	0%	0	3	-3
(Sweden)	Sweden	1975	2025	6	0	1	5	0%	4	15	-11
(Switzerland)	Switzerland	1983	2026	3	0	0	3	0%	1	6	-5
(Syria)	Syria	1972	1980	5	3	1	1	60%	7	2	+5
(Turkey)	Turkey	1972	1979	3	2	0	1	66.67%	2	4	-2
(United Arab Emirates)	United Arab Emirates	1973	2025	7	3	3	1	42.86%	6	4	+2
(United States)	United States	2010	2010	1	0	0	1	0%	0	1	-1
(Uruguay)	Uruguay	2009	2026	2	1	1	0	50%	1	0	+1
(Vietnam)	Vietnam **	1959	1959	1	1	0	0	100%	5	0	+5
(South Yemen)	South Yemen †	1972	1973	2	2	0	0	100%	19	2	+17
(Socialist Federal Republic of Yugoslavia)	Yugoslavia †	1963	1980	4	0	1	3	0%	4	9	-5

Notes:

- (†) Defunct national teams
- (*) Results for West Germany listed separately
- (**) Results as North Vietnam

=== Statistics by Confederation ===
- Last update: As of 6 October 2026

==== Asian Football Confederation ====
R.	Confederation	Played	Won	Drawn	Lost	GF	GA	GD
1	Central Asian Football Association	3	1	0	2	3	4	−1
2	ASEAN Football Federation	3	2	1	0	9	3	+6
3	East Asian Football Federation	8	4	1	3	14	9	+5
4	West Asian Football Federation	52	28	15	9	90	39	+51
5	South Asian Football Federation	1	0	0	1	0	1	−1
Total		66	34	17	15	113	56	+57

==== Confederation of African Football ====
R.	Confederation	Played	Won	Drawn	Lost	GF	GA	GD
1	Union of North African Football Federations	137	54	46	37	152	120	+32
2	West African Football Union	236	120	60	56	385	201	+183
3	Central African Football Federations' Union	37	13	10	14	53	37	+16
4	Council for East and Central Africa Football Associations	75	46	20	9	145	52	+93
5	Council of Southern Africa Football Associations	64	34	19	11	114	58	+56
Total		552	270	156	127	853	466	+387

==== Americas ====
R.	Confederation	Played	Won	Drawn	Lost	GF	GA	GD
1	North American Football Union	4	1	1	2	3	5	−2
2	Central American Football Union	1	1	0	0	7	0	+7
3	Caribbean Football Union	1	0	0	1	0	1	−1
4	South American Football Confederation	12	4	2	6	14	20	−6
Total		18	6	3	9	24	26	–2

==== Union of European Football Associations ====
R.	Confederation	Played	Won	Drawn	Lost	GF	GA	GD
1	Union of European Football Associations	75	15	18	41	71	129	−58

==== Oceania Football Confederation ====
R.	Confederation	Played	Won	Drawn	Lost	GF	GA	GD
1	Oceania Football Confederation	0	0	0	0	0	0	0

==== By competition ====
As of 6 October 2026

Competition	Pld	W	D	L	GF	GA	GD	Win%	PPG
FIFA World Cup	18	4	4	10	18	31	−13	22.22	0.88
FIFA World Cup qualification	111	56	27	28	188	107	+81	50.45	1.75
Africa Cup of Nations	88	34	25	29	109	97	+12	38.63	1.44
African Nations Championship	4	1	3	0	5	2	+3	25.00	1.50
African Nations Championship qualification	3	2	1	0	5	0	+5	66.67	2.3
Africa Cup of Nations qualification (Note: Qualifiers for the 2006/2010 Nations Cup are included in the World Cup figures only.)	130	74	33	23	242	107	+135	56.92	1.96
International Friendlies	252	101	73	78	361	276	+85	40.07	1.49
Minor tournaments (Note: Includes the FIFA Arab Cup, Football at the Summer Olympics, Football at the African Games, Football at the Mediterranean Games, Arab Nations Cup, Palestine Cup of Nations and Afro-Asian Cup of Nations.)	87	44	20	23	150	77	+73	50.57	1.74
Total	693	316	186	191	1078	698	+380	45.58	1.63

=== Team yet to play against Algeria ===
Teams yet to play Algeria
Afghanistan	Azerbaijan	Suriname	
Australia	South Sudan	Ukraine	Trinidad and Tobago
Bhutan	Scotland	El Salvador	Turks and Caicos Islands
Brunei	São Tomé and Príncipe	U.S. Virgin Islands	
Mauritius	Honduras		
Chinese Taipei	Nicaragua		
Hong Kong	Panama		
Eswatini	Comoros	Anguilla	Ecuador
India	Belarus	Antigua and Barbuda	Paraguay
Japan	Croatia	Aruba	Venezuela
Kyrgyzstan	Cyprus	Bahamas	Saint Lucia
Laos	Czech Republic	Barbados	American Samoa
Macau	Estonia	Bermuda	Cook Islands
Costa Rica	Faroe Islands	Bonaire	Fiji
Maldives	Macedonia	British Virgin Islands	Kiribati
Mongolia	Georgia	Cayman Islands	New Caledonia
Myanmar	Gibraltar	Curaçao	New Zealand
Saint Martin	Greece	Dominica	Niue
Pakistan	Iceland	Dominican Republic	Papua New Guinea
Philippines	Israel	French Guiana	Samoa
Tajikistan	Kazakhstan	Grenada	Solomon Islands
Thailand	Latvia	Guadeloupe	Tahiti
Timor-Leste	Liechtenstein	Guyana	Tonga
Turkmenistan	Lithuania	Haiti	Tuvalu
Uzbekistan	Moldova	Jamaica	Vanuatu
Montenegro	Martinique	Sint Maarten	
Montserrat	Saint Martin	Singapore	
Norway	Puerto Rico	Comoros	
Sri Lanka		Andorra	San Marino
Saint Vincent and the Grenadines	Wales	Saint Kitts and Nevis	Belize
