= Serge Perruchini =

Monegasque-born French footballer (born 1955)

Personal information
- Date of birth: 7 January 1955 (age 71)
- Place of birth: Monaco
- Height: 1.80 m (5 ft 11 in)
- Position: Defender

Senior career*
| Years | Team | Apps | (Gls) |
| 1973–1978 | AS Monaco | 39 | (0) |
| 1978–1979 | Montpellier | 20 | (0) |

International career
| 1975 | France amateurs | | |
- * Club domestic league appearances and goals

Serge Perruchini (born 7 January 1955) is a former footballer who played as a defender. Born in Monaco, he played for the French national amateur team.

== Career ==
Between 1973 and 1978, Perruchini played a total of 45 matches for AS Monaco, including 31 in the French Division 1, and was part of the team that won the Division 1 title in the 1977–78 season. In 1978, he joined French Division 3 side Montpellier, where he played 22 matches.

In 1975, he played for the French national amateur team at the Mediterranean Games in Algeria, where they finished as silver medalists. He was also part of France's team at the 1975 and 1976 Toulon Tournament, although he didn't play any matches in either.

== Honours ==
Monaco

- French Division 2: 1976–77
- French Division 1: 1977–78

France amateurs

- Football at the Mediterranean Games silver medalist: 1975
