= Turkey national football B team =

Reserve team for the Turkey national football team

Turkey B
- Nickname: Ay Yıldızlar (The Crescent Stars)
- Association: Turkish Football Federation
- Head coach: Mehmet Yıldırım
- Most caps: Tevfik Köse; Ferhat Kiraz; Kemal Tokak (8)
- Top scorer: Veysel Sarı (4)
First colours	Second colours

First international
- Turkey A2 2–1 Germany B (Mönchengladbach, Germany; 6 September 2002)

Biggest win
- Turkey A2 5–0 Estonia U-23 (Adana, Turkey; 29 February 2012)

Biggest defeat
- Denmark U-21 4–0 Turkey A2 (Vejle, Denmark; 6 June 2011)

The Turkey national football B team or Turkey national under-23 football team, also known as the Turkey A2 national football team, is a reserve team for the Turkey national football team. It features players from the A2 Ligi. The team played their first match in 2002 at the 2003 Future Cup. They have played 23 matches, winning eleven, drawing eight, and losing four. The team is currently coached by Mehmet Yıldırım.

== History ==
The A2 team was seldom used from the foundation in 2002 until 2008.

When Guus Hiddink took over the senior squad, he re-introduced the reserve squad. The team came together for their first camp in Istanbul in November 2010. The team played their first matches against Belarus in February 2011.

The team participated in the 2012 Toulon Tournament from 23 May to 1 June. They finished in second place after losing the final to Mexico. They also won the 2011–13 International Challenge Trophy.

At the 2013 Islamic Solidarity Games in Palembang, Indonesia, the team took the bronze medal defeating the squad of Saudi Arabia 2–1. The team won its first gold medal in the tournament at the 2021 Islamic Solidarity Games in Konya, Turkey, by beating Saudi Arabia 1–0 in the final.

== Results and statistics ==
=== Olympic Games ===
Olympic Games record
Year	Result	Position	Pld	W	D	L	GF	GA
(Spain) 1992	Did not qualify							
(United States) 1996	Did not qualify							
(Australia) 2000	Did not qualify							
(Greece) 2004	Did not qualify							
(China) 2008	Did not qualify							
(United Kingdom) 2012	Did not qualify							
(Brazil) 2016	Did not qualify							
(Japan) 2020	Did not qualify							
(France) 2024	Did not qualify							
(United States) 2028	To be decided							
(Australia) 2032	To be decided							
Total	Quarter-finals	0/9	0	0	0	0	0	0

=== Mediterranean Games ===
Mediterranean Games record
Year	Result	Rank	M	W	D	L	GF	GA
(Egypt) 1951	did not participate							
(Spain) 1955	did not participate							
(Lebanon) 1959	Runners-up	2nd	2	1	1	0	7	4
(Italy) 1963	Runners-up	2nd	5	3	1	1	12	7
(Tunisia) 1967	Fourth place	4th	5	2	1	2	5	7
(Turkey) 1971	Third place	3rd	4	3	1	0	4	1
(Algeria) 1975	Group stage	7th	4	0	2	2	1	5
(Socialist Federal Republic of Yugoslavia) 1979	Group stage	5th	3	1	1	1	2	2
(Morocco) 1983	Runners-up	2nd	4	2	0	2	4	5
(Syria) 1987	Third place	3rd	5	3	0	2	6	2
1991–present	See Turkey national under-20 football team							
Total	Runners-up	8/10	32	15	7	10	41	33

=== Most appearances and goals ===
Appearances

Player	Caps	Goals
Tevfik Köse	8	3
Ferhat Kiraz	8	0
Kemal Tokak	8	0
Kağan Söylemezgiller	7	0
Necati Ateş	6	3

Goals

Player	Goals	Caps
Yakup Alkan	5	5
Veysel Sarı	4	4
Ersen Martin	3	5
Necati Ateş	3	6
Tevfik Köse	3	8
Erdi Güncan	3	5
Melih Rahman Nişancı	1	5
Okan Baydemir	1	5
İbrahim Hırçın	1	5
Samet Katanalp	1	5
Oğuzhan Durmuş Çeşmeli	1	5
Ali Say	1	5
Orkun Dervişler	1	5

== Squads ==
=== Current squad ===
The squad as of 28 July 2022, which participated at the 5th Islamic Solidarity Games in Konya, Turkey from 8 August to 16 August 2022.

Head coach: Mehmet Yıldırım

No.	Pos.	Player	Date of birth (age)	Caps	Club
	GK	Utku Yuvakuran	11 February 1997 (age 29)		(Turkey) Beşiktaş
	GK	İrfan Can Eğribayat	30 June 1998 (age 28)		(Turkey) Göztepe
	GK	Ataberk Dadakdeniz	5 August 1999 (age 27)		(Turkey) Antalyaspor
	GK	Batuhan Şen	3 February 1999 (age 27)		(Turkey) Galatasaray
	DF	Ahmet Gülay	13 January 2003 (age 23)		(Turkey) Alanyaspor
	DF	Fatih Kuruçuk	21 January 1998 (age 28)		(Turkey) Bandırmaspor
	DF	Muhammet Taha Şahin	22 October 2000 (age 26)		(Turkey) Manisa FK
	DF	Tayyip Talha Sanuç	17 December 1999 (age 26)		(Turkey) Adana Demirspor
	DF	İsmail Çokçalış	21 June 2000 (age 26)		(Turkey) Adana Demirspor
	DF	Kazımcan Karataş	16 January 2003 (age 23)		(Turkey) Galatasaray
	DF	Arda Kızıldağ	15 October 1998 (age 28)		(Turkey) Gaziantep
	MF	Kartal Kayra Yılmaz	4 November 2000 (age 25)		(Turkey) Beşiktaş
	MF	Polat Yaldır	17 May 2003 (age 23)		(Turkey) Samsunspor
	MF	Ali Kaan Güneren	8 April 2000 (age 26)		(Turkey) Ankaragücü
	MF	Mehmet Özcan	10 August 1998 (age 28)		(Turkey) Bandırmaspor
	MF	Tuğbey Akgün	9 April 2003 (age 23)		(Turkey) Bursaspor
	MF	Burak Kapacak	26 May 1998 (age 28)		(Turkey) Fenerbahçe
	MF	Barış Alper Yılmaz	23 May 2000 (age 26)		(Turkey) Galatasaray
	MF	Adem Eren Kabak	12 December 2000 (age 25)		(Turkey) Konyaspor
	MF	Celil Yüksel	1 January 1998 (age 28)		(Turkey) Samsunspor
	FW	Muhammed Gümüşkaya	1 January 2001 (age 25)		(Turkey) Fenerbahçe
	FW	Metehan Altunbaş	7 January 2003 (age 23)		(Turkey) Adanaspor
	FW	Umut Nayir	28 June 1993 (age 33)		(Turkey) Giresunspor

== Honours ==
- International Challenge Trophy: 2011–13
- Future Team Cup: 2002–03, 2004–05
- Islamic Solidarity Games: gold in 2022, bronze in 2013
