= Ataberk Dadakdeniz =

Turkish footballer (born 1999)

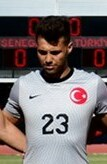
- Dadakdeniz in 2022

Personal information
- Full name: Mehmet Ataberk Dadakdeniz
- Date of birth: 5 August 1999 (age 27)
- Place of birth: İzmir, Turkey
- Height: 1.94 m (6 ft 4 in)
- Position: Goalkeeper

Team information
- Current team: Gaziantep
- Number: 35

Youth career
- 2011–2012: Bursa Güvenspor
- 2012–2016: Bursaspor

Senior career*
| Years | Team | Apps | (Gls) |
| 2016–2021 | Bursaspor | 22 | (0) |
| 2021–2026 | Antalyaspor | 5 | (0) |
| 2024–2025 | → Erzurumspor (loan) | 31 | (0) |
| 2026 | Sakaryaspor | 3 | (0) |
| 2026– | Gaziantep | 0 | (0) |

International career^{‡}
| 2016 | Turkey U17 | 1 | (0) |
| 2017 | Turkey U18 | 3 | (0) |
| 2021–2022 | Turkey U19 | 13 | (0) |
| 2022 | Turkey U23 | 3 | (0) |
Medal record
Men's football
Representing Turkey
Islamic Solidarity Games
| Gold medal – first place | 2021 Konya |
- * Club domestic league appearances and goals as of 11 October 2026 ‡ National team caps and goals as of 23:07, 26 February 2023 (UTC)

Mehmet Ataberk Dadakdeniz (born 5 August 1999) is a Turkish professional footballer who plays as a goalkeeper for Süper Lig club Gaziantep.

== Club career ==
Dadakdeniz is a youth product of Bursa Güvenspor and Bursaspor. He signed his first professional contract with Bursaspor on 16 May 2016 for 3 years. On 16 September 2021, he moved to Antalyaspor signing a 2.5 year contract. He made his professional debut with Antalyaspor as a starter in a 0–0 Süper Lig tie with Beşiktaş on 26 February 2023, saving a penalty and keeping a clean sheet.

== International career ==
Dadakdeniz is a youth international for Turkey, having played up to the Turkey U23 in their winning campaign at the 2021 Islamic Solidarity Games.

== Honours ==
Turkey U23

- Islamic Solidarity Games: 2021
