= Yugoslavia Olympic football team =

National association football team

Yugoslavia
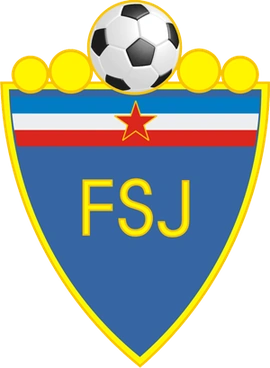
- Association: Football Association of Yugoslavia
- FIFA code: YUG
First colours	Second colours

Summer Olympic Games
- Appearances: 11 (first in 1920)
- Best result: Gold Medal, 1960

Olympic medal record

Men's Football
Silver medal – second place	1948 London	Team
Silver medal – second place	1952 Helsinki	Team
Silver medal – second place	1956 Melbourne	Team
Gold medal – first place	1960 Rome	Team
Bronze medal – third place	1984 Los Angeles	Team

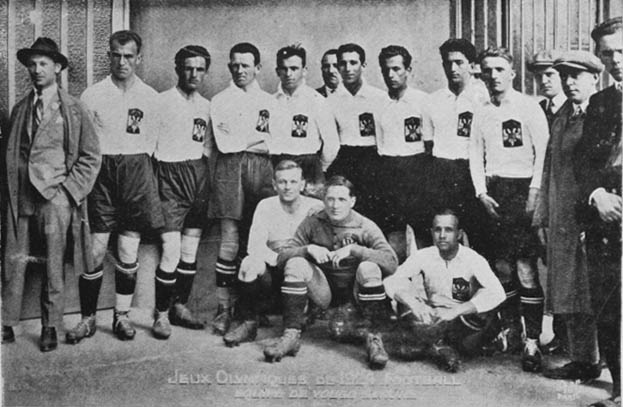
Yugoslavia at the 1924 Summer Olympics

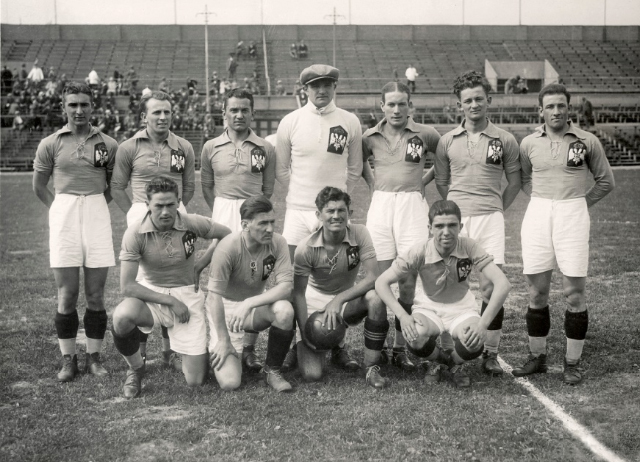
Yugoslavia at the 1928 Summer Olympics

The Yugoslavia Olympic football team was the men's national football team of Yugoslavia from 1918 to 1992 in the Socialist Federal Republic of Yugoslavia.

After the state's dissolution in 1992, the following teams were formed:

- Bosnia and Herzegovina national under-23 football team
- Croatia national under-23 football team
- Macedonia national under-23 football team
- Slovenia national under-23 football team
- FR Yugoslavia national under-23 football team (succeeded by Serbia national under-23 football team and Montenegro national under-23 football team in 2006)

== Competitive record ==
=== Summer Olympics ===
Since 1992 the Olympic roster may consist of under-23 year old players, plus three over the age players.

Gold medal Silver medal Bronze medal

Summer Olympics										Qualification						
Year	Host	Round	Pld	W	D	L	F	A	Squad	Pos.	Pld	W	D	L	F	A
1900 to 1968		See Yugoslavia national football team								See Yugoslavia national football team						
1972	West Germany	Did not qualify								2nd	4	2	1	1	3	2
1976	Canada	Did not qualify								R1	2	0	1	1	1	4
1980	Soviet Union	Fourth place	6	3	1	2	9	7	Squad	1st	4	3	0	1	9	3
1984	United States	Third place	6	5	0	1	16	10	Squad	1st	6	4	1	1	14	6
1988	South Korea	Group stage	3	1	0	2	4	4	Squad	1st	8	6	1	1	17	5
1992	Spain	Did not qualify								2nd	6	4	0	2	11	10
Total		Third place	15	9	1	5	29	21	—	3/6	30	19	4	7	55	30

=== Mediterranean Games ===
Football at the Mediterranean Games
Year	Placing	M	W	D	L	GF	GA
1951-1967	DNE	0	0	0	0	0	0
(Turkey) 1971	1	3	2	1	0	8	2
(Algeria) 1975	5	4	2	1	1	8	3
(Socialist Federal Republic of Yugoslavia) 1979	1	5	5	0	0	16	4
(Morocco) 1983	DNE	0	0	0	0	0	0
(Syria) 1987	DNE	0	0	0	0	0	0
(Greece) 1991	4	4	2	0	2	13	5
Total	4/11	16	11	2	3	45	14

Yugoslavia national under-20 football team

== See also ==
- Football in Yugoslavia
- Yugoslavia national football team
- Yugoslavia national under-21 football team
- Yugoslavia national under-19 football team
