= Eren Karadağ =

Turkish footballer (born 2000)

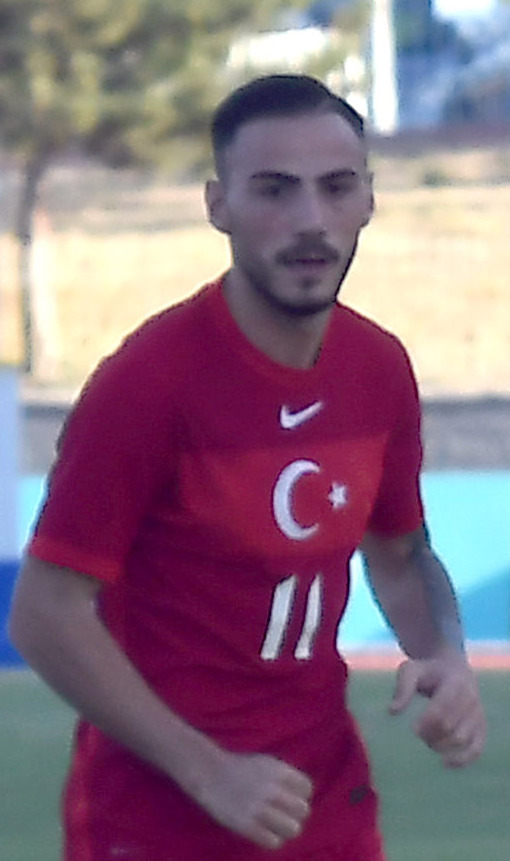
- Eren Karadağ in 2022

Personal information
- Date of birth: 1 January 2000 (age 26)
- Place of birth: Rize, Turkey
- Height: 1.74 m (5 ft 9 in)
- Position: Winger

Team information
- Current team: Sarıyer (on loan from Çorum)
- Number: 11

Youth career
- 2011–2018: Çaykur Rizespor

Senior career*
Years	Team	Apps	(Gls)
2018–2023	Çaykur Rizespor	5	(0)
2020	→ Esenler Erokspor (loan)	6	(0)
2020–2021	→ Pazarspor (loan)	35	(16)
2022	→ Adanaspor (loan)	17	(1)
2022–2023	→ Düzcespor (loan)	32	(7)
2023–	Çorum	45	(7)
2023–2024	→ Batman Petrolspor (loan)	12	(0)
2024	→ Küçükçekmece Sinopspor (loan)	14	(8)
2026–	→ Sarıyer (loan)	6	(0)

International career^{‡}
2022	Turkey U23	3	(1)
Medal record
Men's football
Representing Turkey
Islamic Solidarity Games
Gold medal – first place	2021 Konya
- * Club domestic league appearances and goals as of 13 October 2026 ‡ National team caps and goals as of 06:32, 2 February 2023 (UTC)

Eren Karadağ (born 1 January 2000) is a Turkish professional footballer who plays as a winger for TFF First League club Sarıyer on loan from Çorum.

== Professional career ==
A youth product for Çaykur Rizespor since 2011, he signed a professional contract with them in 2018 and began his senior career with successive loans with Esenler Erokspor and Pazarspor. He made his professional debut for Çaykur Rizespor in a 3–0 Süper Lig loss to Beşiktaş on 13 August 2021.

On 13 November 2025, Karadağ was banned from playing for 9 months for his involvement in the 2025 Turkish football betting scandal.

== International career ==
Karadağ represented the Turkey U23s in their winning campaign at the 2021 Islamic Solidarity Games.

== Honours ==
Turkey U23

- Islamic Solidarity Games: 2021
