= Aleksandar Panajotović =

Yugoslav and Serbian footballer

Personal information
- Date of birth: 28 January 1952 (age 74)
- Place of birth: FPR Yugoslavia
- Positions: Defender; forward

Youth career
- Radnički Pirot

Senior career*
Years	Team	Apps	(Gls)
1968–1970	Radnički Pirot		
1970–1976	Red Star Belgrade	72	(23)
1977–1982	Radnički Niš	153	(17)
198x–198x	Yumco Vranje		
198x–198x	Napredak Aleksinac		
Total		225	(40)

International career
1971	Yugoslavia Olympic	3	(5)
1973	Yugoslavia U23	2	(1)
Medal record
Gold medal – first place	Mediterranean Games	1971
- * Club domestic league appearances and goals

Aleksandar Panajotović (Serbian Cyrillic: Александар Панајотовић; born 28 January 1952) is a former Yugoslav and Serbian footballer.

== Club career ==
After growing up in Kruševac, Panajotović moved to Pirot with his family when still a child. He initially played handball but later switched to football and joined the youth team of Radnički Pirot. Shortly after, Panajotović was promoted to the first team, helping them win promotion to the Yugoslav Second League in 1969. A year later, Panajotović was transferred to Yugoslav champions Red Star Belgrade, signing a four-year contract in June 1970.

In the second half of the 1976–77 season, Panajotović moved to fellow Yugoslav First League side Radnički Niš. He was a regular member of the team that reached the semi-finals of the 1981–82 UEFA Cup, scoring three goals in the process. During the following season, Panajotović left the club and spent the final years of his career with Yumco Vranje and Napredak Aleksinac, playing in the lower leagues.

== International career ==
Panajotović represented Yugoslavia at the 1971 Mediterranean Games, winning the gold medal. He scored four goals in the tournament. He also played for Yugoslavia during the 1974 UEFA European Under-23 Championship.

== Honours ==
Red Star Belgrade

- Yugoslav First League: 1972–73
- Yugoslav Cup: 1970–71
