= Yugoslavia national under-23 football team =

Yugoslavia national under-23 football team may refer to:

- Yugoslavia national under-21 football team, which replaced the U-23 team in 1978
- Yugoslavia Olympic football team, which competed in the Olympic football tournament, an under-23 competition
