= Paul Imiéla =

French footballer (1943–2024)

Personal information
- Date of birth: 23 January 1943
- Place of birth: Houdain, German-occupied Belgium and Northern France
- Date of death: 17 September 2024 (aged 81)
- Height: 1.81 m (5 ft 11 in)
- Position: Defender

Senior career*
Years	Team	Apps	(Gls)
1965–1980	Amiens	404	(30)
Total		404	(30)

International career
- France Amateurs
- * Club domestic league appearances and goals

Paul Imiéla (23 January 1943 – 17 September 2024) was a French footballer who played as a defender. He played his entire career for Amiens SC, for whom he was voted "player of the century" by Le Courrier picard.

== Biography ==
Born in Houdain on 23 January 1943, Imiéla was spotted by Amiens in 1964 by a volunteer manager. He joined the club while it was in the Championnat de France Amateur. The club moved up to Division 2 during his time there, and he played seven seasons for the club within the league as a captain. He was also captain of the France amateur national team.

Imiéla died on 17 September 2024, at the age of 81.
