= Nikos Lekatsas =

Greek footballer (1926–?)

Personal information
- Date of birth: 1926
- Place of birth: Piraeus, Greece
- Position: Forward

Youth career
- –1944: Keramikos Kaminion

Senior career*
Years	Team	Apps	(Gls)
1944–1949	Aris Piraeus		
1949–1957	Ethnikos Piraeus		

International career
1949–1951	Greece	3	(4)
- * Club domestic league appearances and goals

Nikos Lekatsas (Greek: Νίκος Λεκατσάς; 1926 – unknown) was a Greek footballer who played as a forward for Ethnikos Piraeus. He featured three times for the Greece national team between 1949 and 1951, scoring four goals.

== Career statistics ==
Appearances and goals by national team and year
National team	Year	Apps	Goals
Greece	1949	1	0
Greece	1950	0	0
Greece	1951	2	4
Total		3	4

Scores and results list Greece's goal tally first, score column indicates score after each Greece goal.

List of international goals scored by Nikos Lekatsas
No.	Date	Venue	Opponent	Score	Result	Competition
1	14 October 1951	Muhammad Ali Stadium, Alexandria, Egypt	Syria	1–0	4–0	1951 Mediterranean Games
2	14 October 1951	Muhammad Ali Stadium, Alexandria, Egypt	Syria	2–0	4–0	1951 Mediterranean Games
3	14 October 1951	Muhammad Ali Stadium, Alexandria, Egypt	Syria	3–0	4–0	1951 Mediterranean Games
4	18 October 1951	Muhammad Ali Stadium, Alexandria, Egypt	Egypt	2–0	2–0	1951 Mediterranean Games
