= Hasan Özdemir (footballer) =

Turkish footballer

Personal information
- Full name: Hasan Kemal Özdemir
- Date of birth: 9 February 1964 (age 62)
- Place of birth: Sinop, Turkey

Senior career*
Years	Team	Apps	(Gls)
1982–1992	Fenerbahçe		
1988–1989	→ Sakaryaspor (loan)		
1989–1990	→ Adana Demirspor (loan)		
1991–1992	→ Adana Demirspor (loan)		
1992–1996	Sakaryaspor		
1996–1997	Alanyaspor		
1997–2001	Sakaryaspor		
1988–1989	→ Sapancaspor (loan)		

International career
1985–1990	Turkey	3	(0)

Managerial career
- 2011–2013: Fenerbahçe (youth)
- * Club domestic league appearances and goals

Hasan Kemal Özdemir (born 9 February 1964) is a retired Turkish football defender. He was capped three times for Turkey, and was also a squad member at the 1983 Mediterranean Games.
