= Philippe Prieur =

French footballer (born 1960)

Personal information
- Full name: Philippe Prieur
- Date of birth: 2 March 1960 (age 66)
- Place of birth: Amboise, France
- Height: 1.75 m (5 ft 9 in)
- Position: Striker

Senior career*
Years	Team	Apps	(Gls)
1977–1981	Paris FC	21	(9)
1981–1986	Le Havre	127	(48)
1986–1988	Caen	62	(33)
1988	Mulhouse	0	(0)
1988–1989	Valenciennes	17	(1)
1989–1990	Le Havre	26	(6)
1990–1991	Chamois Niortais	31	(9)
1991–1992	Lyon Duchère	11	(4)
1992	Bourges	9	(2)
- * Club domestic league appearances and goals

Philippe Prieur (born 2 March 1960) is a French former professional footballer who played as a striker. He was a member of the French squad that won a silver medal at the 1987 Mediterranean Games.
