= Ferhat Kiraz =

Turkish professional footballer (born 1989)

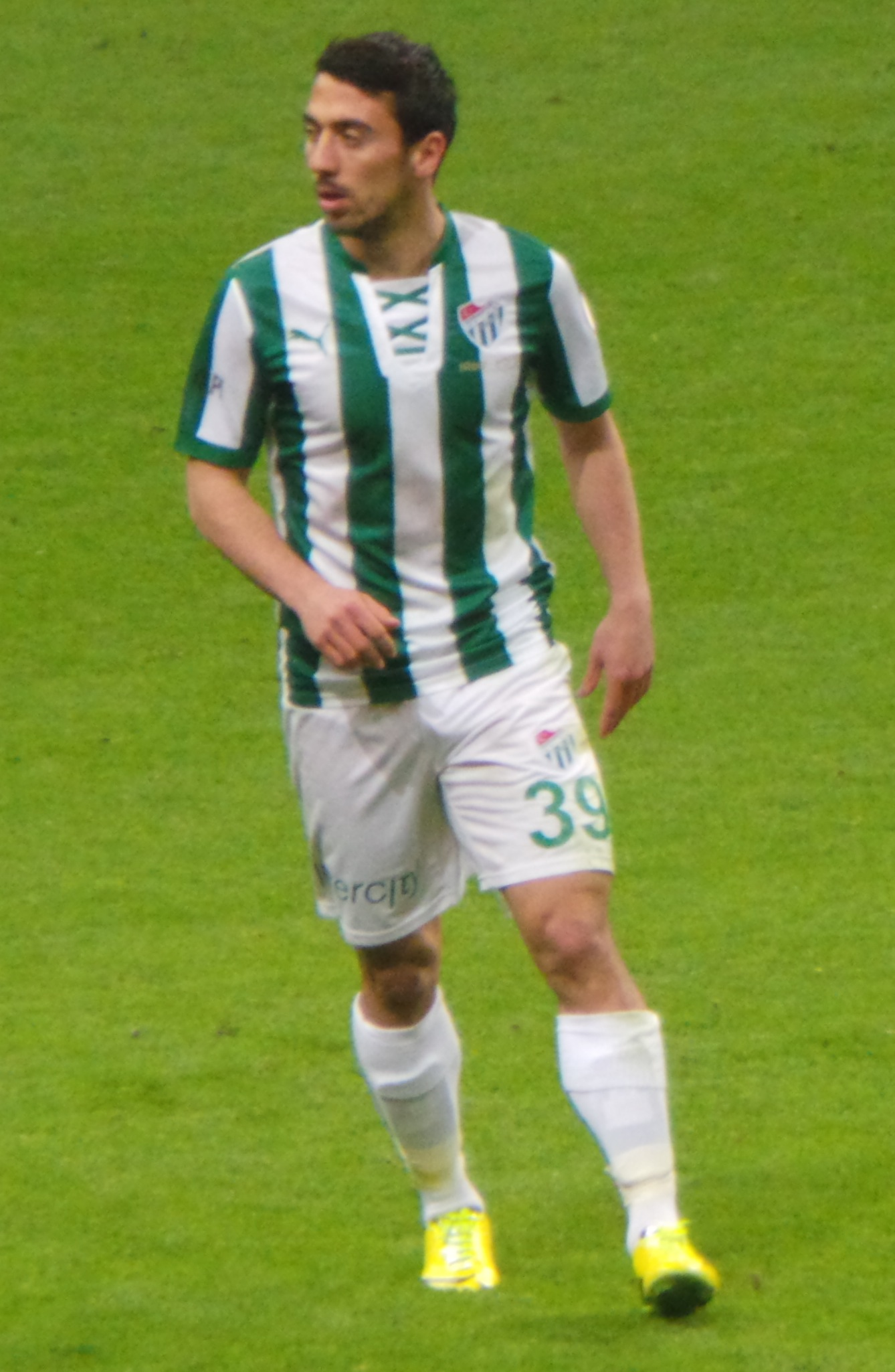
- Kiraz playing for Bursaspor in 2013

Personal information
- Full name: Ferhat Kiraz
- Date of birth: January 2, 1989 (age 37)
- Place of birth: Bozkır, Konya, Turkey
- Height: 1.77 m (5 ft 10 in)
- Position: Left midfielder

Youth career
- 2001–2005: Konya Demirspor
- 2005–2006: Gençlerbirliği

Senior career*
Years	Team	Apps	(Gls)
2006–2010	Gençlerbirliği	8	(0)
2008–2009	→ Karşıyaka (loan)	29	(7)
2010	→ Hacettepe (loan)	12	(2)
2010–2012	Boluspor	60	(22)
2012–2015	Bursaspor	55	(8)
2015–2017	Kasımpaşa	29	(0)
2017	Yeni Malatyaspor	9	(0)
2017–2018	Ankaragücü	23	(0)
2018–2019	Eskişehirspor	18	(0)
2020	Bucaspor 1928	1	(0)

International career
2005	Turkey U16	10	(2)
2005–2006	Turkey U17	12	(5)
2006–2007	Turkey U18	5	(1)
2006–2008	Turkey U19	30	(8)
2009	Turkey U21	7	(0)
2011–2013	Turkey A2	10	(0)
- * Club domestic league appearances and goals as of 16:07, 22 December 2020 (UTC)

Ferhat Kiraz (born 2 January 1989) is a Turkish professional footballer who plays as a left winger. Kiraz is also a youth international, capped at the U-17, U-18, U-19, and U-21 levels.

== Early life and club career ==
Kiraz was born 2 January 1989 in the town of Bozkır in Konya Province. The same year he was born, his father moved to Austria for work. His father visits Kiraz and the rest of his family twice a year. He has a younger brother, Yusuf, a right back currently playing for Hacettepe. Kiraz began his career with local club Konya Demirspor. Sami Özdedeoğlu, then manager of the club, suggested Kiraz to Ünal Karaman, who was then manager of the Turkey national under-21 football team. Kiraz was called up to the Turkey U-16 team, and was subsequently the subject of several inquiries from other clubs. Among them were Istanbul-giants Beşiktaş. However, Kiraz chose Gençlerbirliği instead.

Kiraz signed for Gençlerbirliği in 2005. He competed in the youth leagues before making his debut at the end of the 2006–07 season, coincidentally against the club he turned down, Beşiktaş. Kiraz made eight more appearances for the club before being loaned out to Karşıyaka at the beginning of the 2007–08 season. He made 29 appearances for the İzmir-based club, scoring seven goals. The next season, Kiraz was loaned out to feeder club Hacettepe during the winter transfer period. Kiraz scored two goals in 12 appearances with the club. Boluspor transferred Kiraz before the beginning of the 2010–11 season.
