= Latakia Municipal Stadium =

Multi-purpose stadium in Latakia, Syria

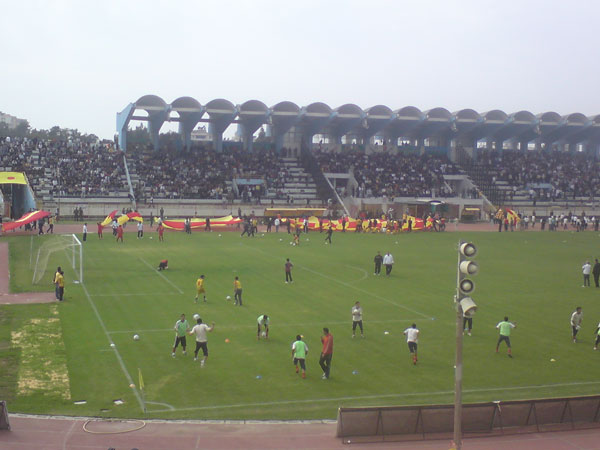
- Interactive map of Latakia Municipal Stadium
- Location: Latakia, Syria
- Coordinates: 35.5277°N 35.7852°E
- Owner: Government of Syria
- Operator: Ministry of Sports and Youth
- Capacity: 28,000

Construction
- Opened: 1978
- Renovated: 2004

Tenants
- Tishreen SC; Hutteen SC; Tadamon SC (formerly)

Latakia Municipal Stadium (Arabic: الملعب البلدي) is a multi-purpose stadium in Latakia, Syria. It is currently used mostly for football matches. The stadium has a capacity of 28,000 spectators. The stadium was opened in 1978 and completely renovated in 2004. It is home to Syrian Premier League football clubs Hutteen SC and Tishreen SC.

The stadium was home to the final match of the football competition at the 1987 Mediterranean Games. Until the fall of the Assad regime in 2024, the Stadium was named Al-Assad Stadium.
