= Metehan Altunbaş =

Turkish footballer (born 2003)

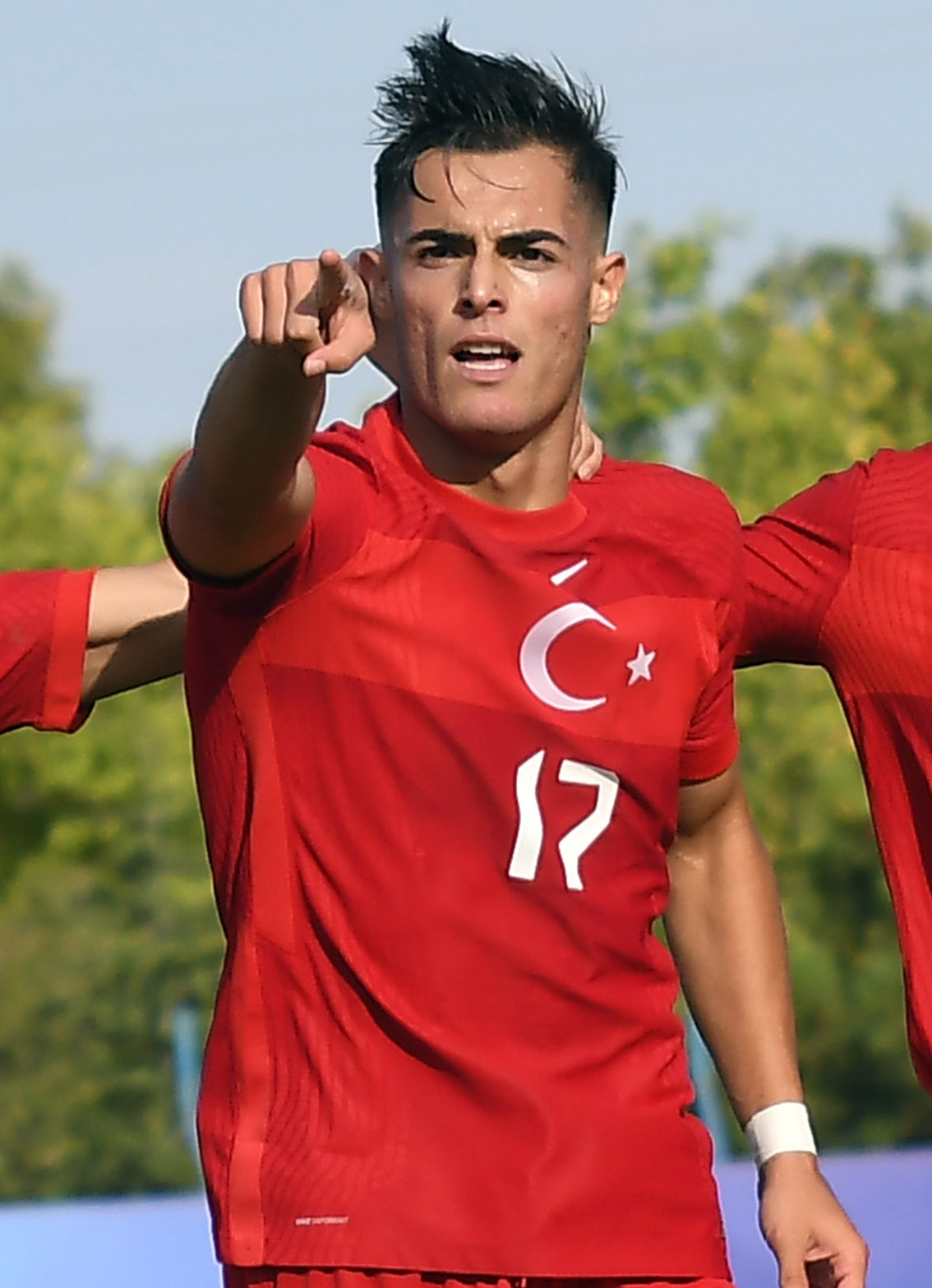
- Altunbaş in 2022

Personal information
- Date of birth: 7 January 2003 (age 23)
- Place of birth: Eskişehir, Turkey
- Height: 1.86 m (6 ft 1 in)
- Position: Forward

Team information
- Current team: Kocaelispor
- Number: 26

Youth career
- 2012–2019: Eskişehirspor

Senior career*
Years	Team	Apps	(Gls)
2018–2021	Eskişehirspor	14	(1)
2020–2022	Juniors OÖ	35	(4)
2020–2022	LASK	3	(0)
2022–2025	Adanaspor	72	(6)
2023	→ Ankara Demirspor (loan)	14	(5)
2025–2026	Eyüpspor	18	(7)
2026–	Kocaelispor	7	(1)

International career^{‡}
2020	Turkey U17	1	(0)
2021–2022	Turkey U19	9	(2)
2022	Turkey U23	4	(1)
2023–2024	Turkey U21	4	(1)
Medal record
Men's football
Representing Turkey
Islamic Solidarity Games
Gold medal – first place	2021 Konya
- * Club domestic league appearances and goals as of 11 October 2026 ‡ National team caps and goals as of 10 September 2024

Metehan Altunbaş (born 7 January 2003) is a Turkish footballer who plays as a forward for Süper Lig club Kocaelispor.

== Career ==
=== Club career ===
Altunbaş came through the youth ranks of Eskişehirspor, making his professional debut for the club in a TFF First League match against İstanbulspor as an overtime substitute on 28 October 2018.

In September 2020, Eskişehirspor announced his transfer to Austrian first tier side LASK, effective January 2021, for a transfer fee of reportedly €150,000. He initially was designed to play for LASK's reserve team Juniors OÖ in second tier, though making his Austrian Bundesliga debut already on 14 March 2021.

=== International career ===
He played for Turkey national under-17 football team in 2020, a friendly against Slovakia, which ended with a 1–0 win for Turkey. He was also part of the U-19 team, having scored two games after nine appearances.

He was summoned to the U-23 squad for the 2021 Islamic Solidarity Games in Konya, as his team won the tournament. He played four games out of five, and scored only one, which was the goal in the final against Saudi Arabia, as Turkey gained gold with a 1–0 win. It was notable that he became the first player to score a goal against Saudi goalkeeper Nawaf Al-Aqidi after nine games without conceding a goal from an open play.

== Honours ==
Turkey U23

- Islamic Solidarity Games: 2021
