= Football at the 1971 Mediterranean Games =

1971 Mediterranean Games football tournament
Tournament details
- Host country: Turkey
- City: İzmir
- Dates: 6–16 October
- Teams: 8 (from 3 confederations)
- Venue: 1 (in 1 host city)

Final positions
- Champions: Yugoslavia Olympic (1st title)
- Runners-up: Tunisia
- Third place: Turkey B
- Fourth place: Egypt

Tournament statistics
- Matches played: 14
- Goals scored: 24 (1.71 per match)
- Top scorer: (Socialist Federal Republic of Yugoslavia) Aleksandar Panajotović (5 goals)

The 1971 Mediterranean Games football tournament was the 6th edition of the Mediterranean Games men's football tournament. The football tournament was held in İzmir, Turkey between the 6–16 October 1971 as part of the 1971 Mediterranean Games.

== Participating teams ==
The following countries have participated for the final tournament:

Federation	Nation
CAF Africa	Egypt; Morocco; Tunisia
AFC Asia	Syria
UEFA Europe	France Amateurs (holders); Greece Olympic; Turkey B (hosts); Yugoslavia Olympic

== Venues ==
Cities	Venues	Capacity
İzmir	İzmir Atatürk Stadium	70,000
İzmir	Alsancak Stadium	25,000
Manisa	Manisa Stadium	?

== Tournament ==
All times local : Time zone (UTC+3)

Key to colours in group tables
Advance to the Final
Advance to the Third place match
Advance to the Fifth place match

=== Group stage ===
==== Group A ====
Team	Pld	W	D	L	GF	GA	GD	Pts
Tunisia	3	2	1	0	3	1	+2	5
Turkey B	3	2	1	0	3	1	+2	5
France Amateurs	3	1	0	2	2	3	−1	2
Syria	3	0	0	3	1	4	−3	0

Tunisia won group on draw.

6 October 1971
18:15

Turkey B	2–1	Syria
Kurukaya 38'; Renklibay 62'	Report	Abdulghani Tatish 27'

Atatürk Stadium, İzmir
Attendance: 47,350
Referee: Nikolaos Zlatanos (Greece)
7 October 1971
20:30

France Amateurs	1–2	Tunisia
Di Caro 12'		Adhouma 84'; Chakroun 85'

Atatürk Stadium, İzmir
Attendance: 4,000
Referee: Mohamed Diab Al-Attar (Egypt)

9 October 1971
20:30

Turkey B	0–0	Tunisia

Atatürk Stadium, İzmir
Attendance: 48,338
Referee: Nikolaos Zlatanos (Greece)
9 October 1971
15:00

France Amateurs	1–0	Syria
Pierre Bouveresse 64'

Manisa Stadium, Manisa
Referee: Mohamed El Azari (Morocco)

12 October 1971
15:00

Tunisia	1–0	Syria
Khouini 79'

Alsancak Stadium, İzmir
Attendance: 60,000
Referee: Mohamed Diab Al-Attar (Egypt)
12 October 1971
20:30

France Amateurs	0–1	Turkey B
	Report	Ergücü 26'

Atatürk Stadium, İzmir
Attendance: 62,825
Referee: Mohamed El Azari (Morocco)

==== Group B ====
Team	Pld	W	D	L	GF	GA	GD	Pts
Yugoslavia Olympic	2	1	1	0	7	2	+5	3
Egypt	2	0	2	0	1	1	0	2
Greece Olympic	2	0	1	1	1	6	−5	1
Morocco (disqualified)	0	0	0	0	0	0	0	0

8 October 1971
15:00

Egypt	0–1	Morocco
		Faras 31'

Alsancak Stadium, İzmir
Referee: Robert Frauciel (France)
8 October 1971
20:30

Yugoslavia Olympic	6–1	Greece Olympic
Novak 8', 53'; Nalić 30'; Panajotović 34', 58', 80'		Zafiropoulos 74'

Atatürk Stadium, İzmir
Attendance: 10,000
Referee: Ömer Karadağ (Turkey)

10 October 1971
15:00

Morocco	1–0	Greece Olympic
Abdelkader Ben Bouali 36'

Manisa Stadium, Manisa
Referee: Hédi Seoudi (Tunisia)
10 October 1971
20:30

Yugoslavia Olympic	1–1	Egypt
Panajotović 30'		Mohammed 89'

Atatürk Stadium, İzmir
Attendance: 10,000
Referee: Veli Necdet Arığ (Turkey)

13 October 1971
20:30

Yugoslavia Olympic	1–0 (Abandoned)	Morocco
Novak 18'	Report	Faras (red card) 8'; Lamrani (red card) 44'

Atatürk Stadium, İzmir
Attendance: 15,000
Referee: Robert Frauciel (France)

Match abandoned at 1–0, Morocco walked off after second player were sent off. Morocco disqualified and all their results annulled.

13 October 1971
15:00

Greece Olympic	0–0	Egypt

Manisa Stadium, Manisa
Referee: Sedat Özselçuk (Turkey)

=== Knockout stage ===
Fifth place
15 October – İzmir
France Amateurs	3
Greece Olympic	1

Final
15 October – İzmir
Tunisia	0
Yugoslavia Ol.	1
Third place
16 October – İzmir
Turkey B (a.e.t.)	1
Egypt	0

==== Fifth place match ====
15 October 1971
15:00

France Amateurs	3–1	Greece Olympic
Michel Granier 26', 32'; Imiéla 58'		Zafiropoulos 6'

Alsancak Stadium, İzmir
Referee: Sedat Özselçuk (Turkey)

==== Third place match ====
15 October 1971
20:30

Turkey B	1–0 (a.e.t.)	Egypt
Baykul Tüysüz 96'	Report

Atatürk Stadium, İzmir
Attendance: 45,250
Referee: Nikolaos Zlatanos (Greece)

==== Final ====
16 October 1971
20:30

Tunisia	0–1	Yugoslavia Olympic
	Report	Panajotović 51'

Atatürk Stadium, İzmir
Attendance: 56,178
Referee: Muzaffer Sarvan (Turkey)

== Tournament classification ==
Rank	Team	Pld	W	D	L	GF	GA	GD	Pts
1	Yugoslavia Olympic	3	2	1	0	8	2	+6	5
2	Tunisia	4	2	1	1	3	2	+1	5
3	Turkey B	4	3	1	0	4	1	+3	7
4	Egypt	3	0	2	1	1	2	–1	2
Eliminated in the group stage
5	France Amateurs	4	2	0	2	5	4	+1	4
6	Greece Olympic	3	0	1	2	2	9	–7	1
7	Syria	3	0	0	3	1	4	–3	0

== Goalscorers ==
There were 24 goals scored in 14 matches, for an average of 1.71 goals per match.

5 goals

- (Socialist Federal Republic of Yugoslavia) Aleksandar Panajotović

2 goals

- (France) Michel Granier
- (Greece) Zafiropoulos
- (Socialist Federal Republic of Yugoslavia) Marijan Novak

1 goal

- (Egypt) Mohammed
- (France) Pierre Bouveresse
- (France) Ange Di Caro
- (France) Paul Imiéla
- (Syria) Abdulghani Tatish
- (Tunisia) Abdesselam Adhouma
- (Tunisia) Ezzedine Chakroun
- (Tunisia) Moncef Khouini
- (Turkey) Adem Kurukaya
- (Turkey) Ali Osman Renklibay
- (Turkey) Mustafa Ergücü
- (Turkey) Baykul Tüysüz
- (Socialist Federal Republic of Yugoslavia) Mesud Nalić
