= Football at the 2021 Islamic Solidarity Games =

Tournament details
- Host country: Turkey
- Dates: 8 – 16 August
- Teams: 8 (from 3 confederations)
- Venues: 2 (in 1 host city)

Final positions
- Champions: Turkey (1st title)
- Runners-up: Saudi Arabia
- Third place: Azerbaijan
- Fourth place: Algeria

Tournament statistics
- Matches played: 12
- Goals scored: 24 (2 per match)
- Top scorer(s): (Algeria) Chemseddine Bekkouche (Saudi Arabia) Ahmed Al-Ghamdi (Senegal) Meleye Diagne (Turkey) Muhammed Gümüşkaya (2 goals each)

Football at the 2021 Islamic Solidarity Games was a football competition held between 8-16 August 2022 at Konya Metropolitan Municipality Stadium and Karatay Mehmet Otkut Football Field in Konya, Turkey. Under the rules, only players born on or after 1 January 1998 (U23) were eligible to participate in the preliminary and final competitions of the tournament. However, up to three players who exceeded this age limit might also be included in the official list of athletes for the final competition. The eight teams was divided into 2 groups of 4 teams each.

Turkey won the first gold medal in the tournament, by beating Saudi Arabia 1–0 in the final.

== Participating teams ==
Eight participated teams. All teams are of Under-23.

Men

Confederation	Nation
CAF (Africa)	Algeria; Cameroon; Morocco; Senegal
AFC (Asia)	Iran; Saudi Arabia
UEFA (Europe)	Azerbaijan; Turkey (hosts)

== Venues ==
Cities	Venues	Capacity
Konya	Selcuk University 15 July Stadium	5,000
Konya	Cumhuriyet Stadium	1,500

== Group stage ==
=== Group A ===
Pos	Team	Pld	W	D	L	GF	GA	GD	Pts	Qualification
1	Turkey (H)	3	2	1	0	5	3	+2	7	Advance to knockout stage
2	Algeria	3	1	2	0	5	2	+3	5	Advance to knockout stage
3	Senegal	3	1	1	1	3	2	+1	4	
4	Cameroon	3	0	0	3	2	8	−6	0	

Source: Islamic Solidarity Games
(H) Hosts
8 August 2022
12:30

Algeria	3–0 (w/o)	Cameroon

Selcuk University 15 July Stadium, Konya
8 August 2022
16:00

Turkey	1–0	Senegal
Gümüşkaya 27'

Selcuk University 15 July Stadium, Konya

10 August 2022
12:30

Turkey	3–2	Cameroon
Karadağ 45'; Aydın 60'; Sanuç 80'		Marou 24'; Wassou 85'

Selcuk University 15 July Stadium, Konya
Referee: Metehan Alpat (Turkey)
10 August 2022
16:00

Senegal	1–1	Algeria
Sambou 63'		Bekkouche 84' (pen.)

Selcuk University 15 July Stadium, Konya

12 August 2022
12:30

Cameroon	0–2	Senegal
		Diagne 32', 65'

Selcuk University 15 July Stadium, Konya
12 August 2022
16:00

Turkey	1–1	Algeria
Cherifi 13' (o.g.)		Temine 19'

Selcuk University 15 July Stadium, Konya
Referee: Hasan Kaçar (Turkey)

=== Group B ===
Pos	Team	Pld	W	D	L	GF	GA	GD	Pts	Qualification
1	Saudi Arabia	3	3	0	0	6	0	+6	9	Advance to knockout stage
2	Azerbaijan	3	1	1	1	5	3	+2	4	Advance to knockout stage
3	Morocco	3	1	1	1	5	4	+1	4	
4	Iran	3	0	0	3	0	9	−9	0	

Source: Islamic Solidarity Games
8 August 2022
12:30

Morocco	3–0 (w/o)	Iran

Cumhuriyet Stadium, Konya
8 August 2022
16:00

Saudi Arabia	1–0	Azerbaijan
Al-Ghamdi 90+6'

Cumhuriyet Stadium, Konya

10 August 2022
12:30

Morocco	0–2	Saudi Arabia
		Al-Johani 45+2'; Al-Mutairi 90+1'

Cumhuriyet Stadium, Konya
10 August 2022
16:00

Azerbaijan	3–0 (w/o)	Iran

Cumhuriyet Stadium, Konya

12 August 2022
12:30

Azerbaijan	2–2	Morocco
Ibrahimli 6'; Abdullazade 47' (pen.)		Slim 10'; Regragui 90+3'

Cumhuriyet Stadium, Konya
12 August 2022
16:00

Iran	0–3 (w/o)	Saudi Arabia

Cumhuriyet Stadium, Konya

== Knockout stage ==
Semifinals
14 August – Konya
Turkey	1
Azerbaijan	0
14 August – Konya
Saudi Arabia	2
Algeria	1

Final
16 August – Konya
Turkey	1
Saudi Arabia	0
Third place
16 August – Konya
Azerbaijan (p)	0 (4)
Algeria	0 (3)

=== Semifinals ===
14 August 2022

Turkey	1–0	Azerbaijan
Gümüşkaya 43'

Selcuk University 15 July Stadium, Konya
Referee: Cihan Aydın (Turkey)

14 August 2022
17:00

Saudi Arabia	2–1	Algeria
Asiri 14'; Al-Ghamdi 20'		Bekkouche 37' (pen.)

Cumhuriyet Stadium, Konya

=== Bronze medal match ===
16 August 2022
14:00

Azerbaijan	0–0 (a.e.t.)	Algeria
Penalties
	4–3

Cumhuriyet Stadium, Konya

=== Gold medal match ===
16 August 2022
17:00

Turkey	1–0	Saudi Arabia
Altunbaş 26'

Selcuk University 15 July Stadium, Konya
Referee: Marcel Bîrsan (Romania)

== Final ranking ==
Pos	Team	Pld	W	D	L	GF	GA	GD	Pts	Final result
1	Turkey	5	4	1	0	7	3	+4	13	Gold medal
2	Saudi Arabia	5	4	0	1	8	2	+6	12	Silver medal
3	Azerbaijan	5	1	2	2	5	4	+1	5	Bronze medal
4	Algeria	5	1	3	1	6	4	+2	6	Fourth place
5	Morocco	3	1	1	1	5	4	+1	4	Eliminated in group stage
6	Senegal	3	1	1	1	3	2	+1	4	Eliminated in group stage
7	Cameroon	3	0	0	3	2	8	−6	0	Eliminated in group stage
8	Iran	3	0	0	3	0	9	−9	0	Eliminated in group stage

Source: Islamic Solidarity Games

== Goalscorers ==
There were 24 goals scored in 12 matches, for an average of 2 goals per match.

2 goals

- (Algeria) Chemseddine Bekkouche
- (Saudi Arabia) Ahmed Al-Ghamdi
- (Senegal) Meleye Diagne
- (Turkey) Muhammed Gümüşkaya

1 goal

- (Algeria) Mounder Temine
- (Azerbaijan) Rufat Abdullazade
- (Azerbaijan) Ismayil Ibrahimli
- (Cameroon) Souaibou Marou
- (Cameroon) Patient Wassou
- (Morocco) Hamza Regragui
- (Morocco) Reda Slim
- (Saudi Arabia) Ziyad Al-Johani
- (Saudi Arabia) Turki Al-Mutairi
- (Saudi Arabia) Haitham Asiri
- (Senegal) Bouly Junior Sambou
- (Turkey) Metehan Altunbaş
- (Turkey) Eren Aydın
- (Turkey) Eren Karadağ
- (Turkey) Tayyip Talha Sanuç

1 own goal

- (Algeria) Toufik Cherifi (against Turkey)
