= France national amateur football team =

France Amateurs
- Nickname: Les Bleus (The Blues)
- Association: French Football Federation (FFF)
First colours	Second colours

First international
- France Amateurs 2–1 Austria Amateurs (Strasbourg, France; 10 May 1934)

Last international
- Congo 3–2 France Amateurs (Mohammedia, Morocco; 20 July 1989)

Biggest win
- France Amateurs 14–0 Chad (Abidjan, Ivory Coast; 27 December 1961)

Biggest defeat
- France Amateurs 0–5 West Germany Amateurs (Mulhouse, France; 11 May 1977)

The France national amateur football team was the amateur representative team for France in football. It was active from 1932 to 1989.

== History ==
The team was created following the introduction of professional-level football in France in 1932. Although it is not the same team as the France Olympic football team, the amateurs participated in the qualification phases for the Olympic Games in 1960 and 1980.

On 15 May 1963, the team played in a match against the England amateur team for the occasion of the centenary of The Football Association.

During the 1967 Mediterranean Games, the final between France and Italy finished in a 0–0 draw. The referees decided to determine a winner via a coin toss, which Italy won. However, the organizational committee overturned this decision and declared both countries as winners. In their next five Mediterranean Games appearances, France finished runners-up three times in 1975, 1979, and 1987.

The team's last ever match was a 3–2 loss against Congo in Mohammedia, Morocco on 22 July 1989.

== Mediterranean Games record ==
Football at the Mediterranean Games
Year	Round	GP	W	D	L	GS	GA
(Egypt) 1951	—	0	0	0	0	0	0
(Spain) 1955	3	3	2	1	0	6	2
(Lebanon) 1959	—	0	0	0	0	0	0
(Italy) 1963	—	0	0	0	0	0	0
(Tunisia) 1967	1	5	3	1	1	9	5
(Turkey) 1971	5	4	2	0	2	5	4
(Algeria) 1975	2	6	3	1	2	10	6
(Socialist Federal Republic of Yugoslavia) 1979	2	5	2	2	1	6	7
(Morocco) 1983	4	4	1	2	1	1	1
(Syria) 1987	2	5	3	1	1	7	2
1991 – present	See France national under-20 team						
Total	7/10	32	16	8	8	44	27

== See also ==
- France national football team
- France national football B team
