= Football at the 1979 Mediterranean Games =

1979 Mediterranean Games football tournament
Tournament details
- Host country: Yugoslavia
- City: Split
- Dates: 21–29 September
- Teams: 8 (from 2 confederations)

Final positions
- Champions: Yugoslavia Olympic (2nd title)
- Runners-up: France Amateurs
- Third place: Algeria B
- Fourth place: Greece Olympic

Tournament statistics
- Matches played: 16
- Goals scored: 45 (2.81 per match)
- Top scorer: (Socialist Federal Republic of Yugoslavia) Zlatko Vujović (4 goals)

The 1979 Mediterranean Games football tournament was the 8th edition of the Mediterranean Games men's football tournament. The football tournament was held in Split, Yugoslavia between 21 and 29 September 1979 as part of the 1979 Mediterranean Games and was contested by 8 teams.

== Participating teams ==
Eight teams took part in the tournament.

Federation	Nation
CAF Africa	Algeria B (holders); Egypt; Morocco; Tunisia
AFC Asia	No team
UEFA Europe	France Amateurs; Greece Olympic; Turkey B Yugoslavia Olympic (hosts)

== Venues ==
Cities	Venues	Capacity
Split	Stadion Poljud	35,000
Šibenik	Stadion Rade Končar	8,000
Omiš	Omiš Stadium	

== Tournament ==
All times local : Time zone (UTC+1)

Key to colours in group tables
Advance to the Semi-finals

=== Group stage ===
==== Group A ====
Team	Pld	W	D	L	GF	GA	GD	Pts
Yugoslavia Olympic	3	3	0	0	10	2	+8	6
Greece Olympic	3	1	1	1	6	8	−2	3
Morocco	3	0	2	1	2	3	−1	2
Egypt	3	0	1	2	2	7	−5	1

21 September 1979

Morocco	1–1	Greece Olympic
Dolmy ?' (pen.)		Kouimtzidis

Stadion NK Zadar, Zadar
21 September 1979

Yugoslavia Olympic	3–0	Egypt
Primorac 21'; Slišković 38'; Zl. Vujović 74'

Stadion Rade Končar, Šibenik
Attendance: 18,000
Referee: René Vigliani (France)

23 September 1979

Egypt	0–0	Morocco

Stadion Rade Končar, Šibenik
23 September 1979

Yugoslavia Olympic	5–1	Greece Olympic
Slišković 32'; Pašić 43'; Janjanin 62', 69'; Primorac 83'		Kourouzidis 79'

Stadion NK Zadar, Zadar
Attendance: 14,000
Referee: Paolo Bergamo (Italy)

25 September 1979

Greece Olympic	4–2	Egypt
Tsirikas 23'; Gerothodoros 60', 71'; Strantzalis 79'		Nouh 3', 33'

Stadion NK Zadar, Zadar
25 September 1979

Yugoslavia Olympic	2–1	Morocco
Zl. Vujović 43'; Šestić 76'		Boussati 50'

Stadion Rade Končar, Šibenik
Attendance: 6,000
Referee: Nihat Özbirgül (Turkey)

==== Group B ====
Team	Pld	W	D	L	GF	GA	GD	Pts
France Amateurs	3	1	2	0	4	3	+1	4
Algeria B	3	1	2	0	3	2	+1	4
Turkey B	3	1	1	1	2	2	0	3
Tunisia	3	0	1	2	2	4	−2	1

21 September 1979

Algeria B	1–1	France Amateurs
Bensaoula 54'		Ricort 8'

Omiš Stadium, Omiš
Attendance: 5,000
Referee: Stjepan Glavina (Yugoslavia)
21 September 1979

Turkey B	1–0	Tunisia
N. Oğuz Aydoğdu 54'	Report

Sportski Center, Makarska
Referee: Abdel Rauf (Egypt)

23 September 1979

Algeria B	1–1	Tunisia
Bousri 38'		Bayari 5'

Omiš Stadium, Omiš
Attendance: 3,500
23 September 1979

France Amateurs	1–1	Turkey B
Trivino 4'		Ulucan 57' (pen.)

Sportski Center, Makarska
Attendance: 4,000
Referee: Bruno Galler (Switzerland)

25 September 1979

Algeria B	1–0	Turkey B
Fergani 68'

Omiš Stadium, Omiš
Attendance: 5,000
Referee: Marijan Rauš (Yugoslavia)
25 September 1979

France Amateurs	2–1	Tunisia
Trivino 27'; Couriol 52'		Hergal 75'

Sportski Center, Makarska

=== Knockout stage ===
Semifinals
27 September
France Amateurs	2
Greece Olympic	1
27 September – Šibenik
Yugoslavia Olympic	3
Algeria B	2

Final
29 September – Split
Yugoslavia Olympic	3
France Amateurs	0
Third place
29 September – Split
Algeria B	2
Greece Olympic	1

==== Semi-finals ====
27 September 1979

France Amateurs	2–1	Greece Olympic
Jacques Raymond; Ricort		Tsirikas

Stadion NK Zadar, Zadar

27 September 1979

Yugoslavia Olympic	3–2	Algeria B
Primorac 4' (pen.); Bogdan 84'; Šestić 88'		Belloumi 60'; Douadi 69'

Stadion Rade Končar, Šibenik
Attendance: 7,000
Referee: Bruno Galler (Switzerland)

==== Third place match ====
29 September 1979

Algeria B	2–1	Greece Olympic
Belloumi 10'; Assad 61' (pen.)		Tsirikas 20'

Stadion Poljud, Split

==== Final ====
29 September 1979

Yugoslavia Olympic	3–0	France Amateurs
Pašić 24'; Zl. Vujović 54', 85'

Stadion Poljud, Split
Attendance: 50,000
Referee: Paolo Bergamo (Italy)

== Tournament classification ==
Rank	Team	Pld	W	D	L	GF	GA	GD	Pts
1	Yugoslavia Olympic	5	5	0	0	16	4	+12	10
2	France Amateurs	5	2	2	1	6	7	–1	6
3	Algeria B	5	2	2	1	7	6	+1	6
4	Greece Olympic	5	1	1	3	8	12	–4	3
Eliminated in the group stage
5	Turkey B	3	1	1	1	2	2	0	3
6	Morocco	3	0	2	1	2	3	–1	2
7	Tunisia	3	0	1	2	2	4	–2	1
8	Egypt	3	0	1	2	2	7	–5	1
