= Football at the 1975 Mediterranean Games =

1975 Mediterranean Games football tournament
Tournament details
- Host country: Algeria
- City: Algiers
- Dates: 24 August – 6 September
- Teams: 9 (from 2 confederations)
- Venue: 2 (in 1 host city)

Final positions
- Champions: Algeria B (1st title)
- Runners-up: France Amateurs
- Third place: Tunisia
- Fourth place: Morocco

Tournament statistics
- Matches played: 22
- Goals scored: 58 (2.64 per match)
- Top scorer: (Algeria) Aïssa Draoui (5 goals)
- Best player: (Algeria) Aïssa Draoui

The 1975 Mediterranean Games football tournament was the 7th edition of the Mediterranean Games men's football tournament. The football tournament was held in Algiers, Algeria between 24 August and 6 September 1975 as part of the 1975 Mediterranean Games and was contested by 9 teams.

== Participating teams ==
Nine teams took part in the tournament. Algeria participated with B team composed mostly of military players. France with B team composed of amateur players.

Federation	Nation
CAF Africa	Algeria B (hosts); Egypt; Libya; Morocco; Tunisia
AFC Asia	No team
UEFA Europe	France Amateurs; Greece Olympic; Turkey B Yugoslavia Olympic (holders)

== Venues ==
Algiers	Football at the 1975 Mediterranean Games is located in Algeria	Algiers
Stade 5 Juillet 1962	Football at the 1975 Mediterranean Games is located in Algeria	Stade 20 Août 1955
Capacity: 85,000	Football at the 1975 Mediterranean Games is located in Algeria	Capacity: 20,000

== Tournament ==
All times local : Time zone (UTC+1)

Key to colours in group tables
Advance to the Semi-finals

=== Group stage ===
==== Group A ====
Team	Pld	W	D	L	GF	GA	GD	Pts
Algeria B	4	4	0	0	10	1	+9	8
France Amateurs	4	3	0	1	6	3	+3	6
Egypt	4	2	0	2	9	7	+2	4
Libya	4	1	0	3	4	8	−4	2
Greece Olympic	4	0	0	4	3	13	−10	0

24 August 1975

Algeria B	2–0	France Amateurs
Draoui 5'; Ighili 42'

Stade 5 Juillet 1962, Algiers
Referee: Velibor Ljujić (Yugoslavia)
24 August 1975

Libya	1–0	Greece Olympic
Goal

Stade 5 Juillet 1962,, Algiers

26 August 1975

Algeria B	5–0	Greece Olympic
Safsafi 14'; Draoui 18', 59' ? (o.g.); Betrouni 89'

Stade 5 Juillet 1962, Algiers
Referee: Orhan Cebe (Turkey)
26 August 1975

France Amateurs	2–0	Egypt
Goal

Stade 5 Juillet 1962, Algiers

29 August 1975

France Amateurs	2–0	Libya
Goal

Stade 5 Juillet 1962, Algiers
29 August 1975

Algeria B	1–0	Egypt
Draoui 85'

Stade 5 Juillet 1962, Algiers
Attendance: 40,000
Referee: Hédi Seoudi (Tunisia)

31 August 1975

Algeria B	2–1	Libya
Keddou 5', 17' (pen.)		? 75'

Stade 5 Juillet 1962, Algiers
Referee: Velibor Ljujić (Yugoslavia)
31 August 1975

Egypt	5–2	Greece Olympic
Shehata 6'; El Seyagui 22'; El-Bably 30'; Abdel Baquy 35'; Abdel Fattah 64'		Goal

Stade 5 Juillet 1962, Algiers

2 September 1975

Egypt	4–2	Libya
Gaafar 12'; El-Bably 43'; Shehata 62', 89'		Goal

Stade 5 Juillet 1962, Algiers
2 September 1975

Greece Olympic	1–2	France Amateurs
Goal		Goal

Stade 5 Juillet 1962, Algiers

==== Group B ====
Team	Pld	W	D	L	GF	GA	GD	Pts
Tunisia	3	1	2	0	3	2	+1	4
Morocco	3	1	2	0	1	0	+1	4
Yugoslavia Olympic	3	1	1	1	6	3	+3	3
Turkey B	3	0	1	2	0	4	−4	1

24 August 1975

Tunisia	3–2	Yugoslavia Olympic
Agrebi 14', 17'; Ghommidh 83'	Report	Antolić 49'; Bakota 51'

20 August 1955 Stadium, Algiers
Referee: Michel Vautrot (France)
24 August 1975

Morocco	1–0	Turkey B
Ouahbi 57'	Report

20 August 1955 Stadium, Algiers
Referee: Abdelkader Aouissi (Algeria)

28 August 1975

Yugoslavia Olympic	0–0	Morocco
	Report

20 August 1955 Stadium, Algiers
Attendance: 4,000
Referee: Panagiotis Kolliropoulos (Greece)
28 August 1975

Tunisia	0–0	Turkey B

20 August 1955 Stadium, Algiers
Referee: El Sadi (Egypt)

31 August 1975

Yugoslavia Olympic	4–0	Turkey B
Lazarević 21'; Pejović 46', 61', 73'	Report

20 August 1955 Stadium, Algiers
Referee: Salem Muhammed Adel (Libya)
31 August 1975

Morocco	0–0	Tunisia

20 August 1955 Stadium, Algiers
Attendance: 5,000

=== Classification stage ===
==== Seventh-place match ====
5 September 1975

Turkey B	1–1 (a.e.t.)	Libya
Goal		Goal
Penalties
	4–2

Stade 5 Juillet 1962, Algiers
Referee: Panagiotis Kolliropoulos (Greece)

==== Fifth-place match ====
5 September 1975

Yugoslavia Olympic	2–0	Egypt
Gaafar 45' (o.g.); Šimek 66'	Report

Stade 5 Juillet 1962, Algiers
Referee: Michel Vautrot (France)

=== Knockout stage ===
Semifinals
4 September – Algiers
Algeria B (a.e.t.)	2
Tunisia	1
4 September – Algiers
France Amateurs (p)	1 (4)
Morocco	1 (3)

Final
6 September – Algiers
Algeria B (a.e.t.)	3
France Amateurs	2
Third place
6 September – Algiers
Tunisia (p)	1 (4)
Morocco	1 (3)

==== Semi-finals ====
4 September 1975

Algeria B	2–1 (a.e.t.)	Tunisia
Naïm 62'; Draoui 96'		Kammoun 70'

Stade 5 Juillet 1962, Algiers
Attendance: 70,000
Referee: Velibor Ljujić (Yugoslavia)

4 September 1975

France Amateurs	1–1 (a.e.t.)	Morocco
Goal		Yaghcha
Penalties
	4–3

Stade 5 Juillet 1962, Algiers

==== Third-place match ====
6 September 1975

Tunisia	1–1 (a.e.t.)	Morocco
Agrebi 79'		Fetoui 84'
Penalties
	4–3

Stade 5 Juillet 1962, Algiers

==== Final ====
6 September 1975

Algeria B	3–2 (a.e.t.)	France Amateurs
Kaoua 71'; Betrouni 90'; Menguelti 111'		Rouyer 35'; Schaer 76' (pen.)

Stade 5 Juillet 1962, Algiers
Attendance: 70,000
Referee: Pedro María Urrestarazu Elordi (Spain)

== Tournament classification ==
Rank	Team	Pld	W	D	L	GF	GA	GD	Pts
1	Algeria B	6	6	0	0	15	4	+11	12
2	France Amateurs	6	3	1	2	10	6	+4	7
3	Tunisia	5	1	3	1	5	5	0	5
4	Morocco	5	1	4	0	3	2	+1	6
Eliminated in the group stage
5	Yugoslavia Olympic	4	2	1	1	8	3	+5	5
6	Egypt	5	2	0	3	9	9	9	4
7	Turkey B	4	0	2	2	1	5	–4	2
8	Libya	5	1	1	3	5	9	–4	3
9	Greece Olympic	4	0	0	4	3	13	–10	0

== Goalscorers ==
There were 58 goals scored in 22 matches, for an average of 2.64 goals per match.

5 goals

- (Algeria) Aïssa Draoui
