= Football at the 1955 Mediterranean Games =

1955 Mediterranean Games football tournament
Tournament details
- Host country: Spain
- City: Barcelona
- Dates: 16–23 July 1955
- Teams: 4 (from 3 confederations)
- Venue: 1 (in 1 host city)

Final positions
- Champions: Egypt (1st title)
- Runners-up: Spain B
- Third place: France Amateurs
- Fourth place: Syria

Tournament statistics
- Matches played: 6
- Goals scored: 21 (3.5 per match)
- Top scorer(s): (Egypt) El-Sayed El-Dhizui (4 goals)

The 1955 Mediterranean Games football tournament was the 2nd edition of the Mediterranean Games men's football tournament. The football tournament was held in Barcelona, Spain between the 16–23 July 1955 as part of the 1955 Mediterranean Games.

== Participating teams ==
The following countries have participated for the final tournament:

Federation	Nation
CAF Africa	Egypt
AFC Asia	Syria
UEFA Europe	France Amateurs; Spain B (hosts)

== Venues ==
Cities	Venues	Capacity
Barcelona	Camp de Les Corts	60,000
Barcelona	Estadio de Montjuic	55,000

== Final tournament ==
All times local : CET (UTC+1)

=== Matches ===
16 July 1955

Spain B	2–1	France Amateurs
Antonio Corsín 32'; Santamaría 88'	Report	Maurice Marin 39'

Camp de Les Corts, Barcelona
Referee: Kassar (Egypt)

17 July 1955

Egypt	6–2	France Amateurs
El-Dhizui; El-Mekkawi; Baheeg; Abdel Fattah	Report	Baulu; Joël Pillard

Camp de Les Corts, Barcelona
Referee: Ramón Azón Roma (Spain)
17 July 1955

Spain B	3–0	Syria
Antonio Corsín 29'; José María Ruiz 30'; Muñoz 31'	Report

Camp de Les Corts, Barcelona
Attendance: 72,000
Referee: Louis Fauquemberghe (France)

20 July 1955

Spain B	1–1	Egypt
Eduardo Vilches 85'		Baheeg 70'

Camp de Les Corts, Barcelona
Referee: Fauzi Tello (Syria)
20 July 1955

France Amateurs	4–0	Syria
Maurice Marin 24', 30'; Baulu 27'; Joël Pillard 79'	Report

Camp de Les Corts, Barcelona
Referee: Ramón Azón Roma (Spain)

23 July 1955

Egypt	3–0	Syria
El-Dhizui 17', 25'; Abdel Fattah 84'	Report

Camp de Les Corts, Barcelona
Referee: Ramón Azón Roma (Spain)

=== Tournament classification ===
Rank	Team	Pld	W	D	L	GF	GA	GD	Pts
1	Egypt	3	2	1	0	10	3	+7	5
2	Spain B	3	2	1	0	6	2	+4	5
3	France Amateurs	3	1	0	2	7	8	–1	2
4	Syria	3	0	0	3	0	10	–10	0

== Winner ==
1955 Mediterranean Games

Egypt
First title

== Statistics ==
=== Goalscorers ===
There were 23 goals scored in 6 matches, for an average of 3.83 goals per match.

4 goals

- (Egypt) El-Sayed El-Dhizui

3 goals

- (France) Maurice Marin

2 goals

- (Egypt) Essam Baheeg
- (Egypt) Ahmed Nabih El-Mekkawi
- (Egypt) Hamdi Abdel Fattah
- (France) Jean-Claude Baulu
- (France) Joël Pillard
- (Spain) Antonio Corsín

1 goal

- (Spain) Miguel Muñoz
- (Spain) José María Ruiz
- (Spain) Paco Santamaría
- (Spain) Eduardo Vilches
