= Football at the 1983 Mediterranean Games =

1983 Mediterranean Games football tournament
Tournament details
- Host country: Morocco
- City: Casablanca
- Dates: 9–17 September
- Teams: 9 (from 3 confederations)
- Venue: 3 (in 3 host cities)

Final positions
- Champions: Morocco (1st title)
- Runners-up: Turkey B
- Third place: Egypt
- Fourth place: France Amateurs

Tournament statistics
- Matches played: 13
- Goals scored: 26 (2 per match)
- Top scorer: (Morocco) Mustafa El Haddaoui (4 goals)

The 1983 Mediterranean Games football tournament was the 9th edition of the Mediterranean Games men's football tournament. The football tournament was held in Casablanca, Morocco between 9 and 17 September 1983 as part of the 1983 Mediterranean Games and was contested by 9 teams.

== Participating teams ==
Nine teams took part in the tournament.

Federation	Nation
CAF Africa	Algeria; Egypt; Libya; Morocco (hosts); Tunisia
AFC Asia	Syria
UEFA Europe	France Amateurs; Greece Olympic; Turkey B

== Venues ==
Cities	Venues	Capacity
Casablanca	Stade Mohammed V	67,000
Rabat	Moulay Abdellah Stadium	68,000
El Jadida	Stade El Abdi	15,000

== Tournament ==
All times local : Time zone (UTC+0)

Key to colours in group tables
Advance to the Semi-finals

=== Group stage ===
Morocco, Egypt and Turkey qualified for semifinals. France won the fourth semifinal place on lots.

==== Group A ====
Team	Pld	W	D	L	GF	GA	GD	Pts
Morocco (H)	2	1	1	0	2	0	+2	3
Greece Olympic	2	1	1	0	2	1	+1	3
Libya	2	0	0	2	1	4	−3	0

9 September 1983

Morocco	0–0	Greece Olympic

Stade Mohammed V, Casablanca

11 September 1983

Greece Olympic	2–1	Libya
Papachristou 5'; Chatzopoulos 81'		Goal

Stade Mohammed V, Casablanca

13 September 1983

Morocco	2–0	Libya
El Haddaoui; Khalifa

Stade Mohammed V, Casablanca

==== Group B ====
Team	Pld	W	D	L	GF	GA	GD	Pts
Egypt	2	1	1	0	1	0	+1	3
France Amateurs	2	1	1	0	1	0	+1	3
Syria	2	0	0	2	0	2	−2	0

9 September 1983

France Amateurs	1–0	Syria
Goal

Moulay Abdellah Stadium, Rabat

11 September 1983

Egypt	1–0	Syria
El-Mashaqui 27'

Moulay Abdellah Stadium, Rabat
Referee: Yusuf Namoğlu (Turkey)

13 September 1983

Egypt	0–0	France Amateurs

Moulay Abdellah Stadium, Rabat

==== Group C ====
Team	Pld	W	D	L	GF	GA	GD	Pts
Turkey B	2	1	0	1	3	2	+1	2
Algeria	2	1	0	1	3	3	0	2
Tunisia	2	1	0	1	4	5	−1	2

9 September 1983

Turkey B	3–1	Tunisia
Çalımbay 39'; Akbaşlı 44', 51'	Report	Rakbaoui 21'

Stade El Abdi, El Jadida
Referee: José Luis García Carrión (Spain)

11 September 1983

Tunisia	3–2	Algeria
Hergal 10'; Rakbaoui 31'; Ben Messaoud 43'		Belloumi 36'; Guendouz 89' (pen.)

Stade El Abdi, El Jadida
Attendance: 15,000
Referee: Mohamed Hossam Eddine (Egypt)

13 September 1983

Turkey B	0–1	Algeria
	Report	Guendouz 31'; Kouici (red card) 87'

Stade El Abdi, El Jadida
Attendance: 10,000
Referee: Salem Sherif (Libya)

=== Knockout stage ===
Semifinals
15 September – Casablanca
Morocco	2
Egypt	1
15 September – Casablanca
Turkey B	1
France Amateurs	0

Final
17 September – Casablanca
Morocco	3
Turkey B	0
Third place
17 September – Casablanca
Egypt (p)	0 (5)
France Amateurs	0 (2)

==== Semi-finals ====
15 September 1983
16:00

Morocco	2–1	Egypt
El Haddaoui 16', 25'		Youssef 54'

Stade Mohammed V, Casablanca

15 September 1983
18:00

Turkey B	1–0	France Amateurs
Özdemir 60'

Moulay Abdellah Stadium, Rabat
Referee: Abdelali Naciri (Morocco)

==== Third place match ====
17 September 1983
16:00

Egypt	0–0	France Amateurs
Penalties
	5–2

Stade Mohammed V, Casablanca

==== Final ====
17 September 1983
18:00

Morocco	3–0	Turkey B
El Haddaoui 25'; Souadi 45'; Labied 80'

Stade Mohammed V, Casablanca
Attendance: 45,000
Referee: José Luis García Carrión (Spain)

== Tournament classification ==
Rank	Team	Pld	W	D	L	GF	GA	GD	Pts
1	Morocco	4	3	1	0	8	2	+6	7
2	Turkey B	4	2	0	2	4	5	–1	4
3	Egypt	4	1	2	1	2	2	0	4
4	France Amateurs	4	1	2	1	1	1	0	4
Eliminated in the group stage
5	Greece Olympic	2	1	1	0	2	1	+1	3
6	Algeria	2	1	0	1	3	3	0	2
7	Tunisia	2	1	0	1	4	5	–1	2
8	Syria	2	0	0	2	0	2	–2	0
9	Libya	2	0	0	2	2	5	–3	0
