= Football at the 1987 Mediterranean Games =

1987 Mediterranean Games football tournament
Tournament details
- Host country: Syria
- City: Latakia
- Dates: 15–25 September
- Teams: 8

Final positions
- Champions: Syria (1st title)
- Runners-up: France Amateurs
- Third place: Turkey Olympic
- Fourth place: Greece XI

Tournament statistics
- Matches played: 16
- Goals scored: 33 (2.06 per match)
- Top scorer: (France) Philippe Prieur (6 goals)

The 1987 Mediterranean Games football tournament was the 10th edition of the Mediterranean Games men's football tournament. The football tournament was held in Latakia, Syria between 15 and 25 September 1987 as part of the 1987 Mediterranean Games and was contested by 8 teams. The host team Syria won the golden medal.

== Participating teams ==
8 teams took part in the tournament.

Federation	Nation
CAF Africa	Algeria XI; Morocco XI (holders)
AFC Asia	Lebanon; Syria (hosts)
UEFA Europe	France Amateurs; Greece XI; San Marino; Turkey Olympic

== System ==
The 8 teams were divided into two groups of four teams. Teams are awarded two points for a win and one for a draw. No points are awarded for a defeat. The top two sides in each group will advance to the semi-finals.

== Venues ==
Cities	Venues	Capacity
Latakia	Sports City Stadium	45,000
Latakia	Al-Assad Stadium	28,000

== Tournament ==
All times local : CET (UTC+2)

Key to colours in group tables
Group winners advance to the Semi-finals

=== Group stage ===
==== Group A ====
Team	Pld	W	D	L	GF	GA	GD	Pts
France Amateurs	3	2	1	0	5	0	+5	5
Greece XI	3	2	0	1	2	1	+1	4
Morocco XI	3	1	1	1	2	2	0	3
Algeria XI	3	0	0	3	1	7	–6	0

15 September 1987

Morocco XI	0–1	Greece XI
		Tsalouchidis 78'

Al-Assad Stadium, Latakia
15 September 1987

Algeria XI	0–4	France Amateurs
		Prieur ?

Al-Assad Stadium, Latakia

17 September 1987

Morocco XI	0–0	France Amateurs

Al-Assad Stadium, Latakia
17 September 1987

Algeria XI	0–1	Greece XI
		Goal

Al-Assad Stadium, Latakia

19 September 1987

France Amateurs	1–0	Greece XI
Goal

Al-Assad Stadium, Latakia
19 September 1987

Morocco XI	2–1	Algeria XI
El Ghorf 49'; Nader (?)		? 23'

Al-Assad Stadium, Latakia

==== Group B ====
Team	Pld	W	D	L	GF	GA	GD	Pts
Syria	3	3	0	0	10	1	+9	6
Turkey Olympic	3	2	0	1	5	1	+4	4
Lebanon	3	0	1	2	1	7	–6	1
San Marino	3	0	1	2	0	7	–7	1

16 September 1987

San Marino	0–0	Lebanon
	Report

Al-Hamadaniah Stadium, Aleppo
Referee: Christos Kolokythas (Greece)
16 September 1987

Syria	1–0	Turkey Olympic
Abu Al-Sel 16' (pen.); Darwish (red card) 56'	Report	Tural (red card) 74'

Al-Hamadaniah Stadium, Aleppo
Referee: Abdelali Naciri (Morocco)

18 September 1987

Turkey Olympic	1–0	Lebanon
Özdilek 42'	Report

Al-Hamadaniah Stadium, Aleppo
Referee: Jean-Marie Lartigot (France)
18 September 1987

Syria	3–0	San Marino
Goal	Report

Al-Hamadaniah Stadium, Aleppo
Referee: Amar Gothari (Algeria)

20 September 1987

Turkey Olympic	4–0	San Marino
Aydın; İnsel	Report

Al-Hamadaniah Stadium, Aleppo
Referee: Amar Gothari (Algeria)
20 September 1987

Syria	6–1	Lebanon
Ahmad; Abu Al-Sel; Deeb 65', 70'; Saad 80'; Al Shaar 87'		Abboud 55' (pen.)

Al-Hamadaniah Stadium, Aleppo

=== Knockout stage ===
Semifinals
22 September
Syria (p)	1 (3)
Greece XI	1 (2)
23 September
France Amateurs	1
Turkey Olympic	0

Final
25 September
Syria	2
France Amateurs	1
Third place
24 September
Turkey Olympic (a.e.t.)	1
Greece XI	0

==== Semi-finals ====
22 September 1987

Syria	1–1	Greece XI
Penalties
	3–2

23 September 1987

France Amateurs	1–0	Turkey Olympic
Prieur 49'	Report

Al-Assad Stadium, Latakia
Referee: Dieter Pauly (W. Germany)

==== Third place match ====
24 September 1987

Turkey Olympic	1–0 (a.e.t.)	Greece XI
Görsen 94'; Karamırnak (red card) 118'	Report

Al-Assad Stadium, Latakia
Attendance: 20,000
Referee: Dieter Pauly (W. Germany)

==== Final ====
25 September 1987

Syria	2–1	France Amateurs
Mahrous 37'; Abu Al-Sel 85' (pen.)		Prieur 44'

Al-Assad Stadium, Latakia
Attendance: 30,000

== Tournament classification ==
Rank	Team	Pld	W	D	L	GF	GA	GD	Pts
1	Syria	5	4	1	0	13	3	+10	9
2	France Amateurs	5	3	1	1	7	2	+5	7
3	Turkey Olympic	5	3	0	2	6	2	+4	6
4	Greece XI	5	2	1	2	3	3	0	5
Eliminated in the group stage
5	Morocco XI	3	1	1	1	2	2	0	3
6	Lebanon	3	0	1	2	1	7	–6	1
7	San Marino	3	0	1	2	0	7	–7	1
8	Algeria XI	3	0	0	3	1	7	–6	0
