= Football at the 1951 Mediterranean Games =

1951 Mediterranean Games football tournament
Tournament details
- Host country: Kingdom of Egypt
- City: Alexandria
- Dates: 14–18 October 1951
- Teams: 3 (from 3 confederations)
- Venue: 1 (in 1 host city)

Final positions
- Champions: Greece (1st title)
- Runners-up: Egypt
- Third place: Syria

Tournament statistics
- Matches played: 3
- Goals scored: 14 (4.67 per match)
- Top scorer(s): (Greece) Nikos Lekatsas (4 goals)

The 1951 Mediterranean Games football tournament was the 1st edition of the Mediterranean Games men's football tournament. The football tournament was held in Alexandria, the Egypt between 14–18 October 1951 as part of the 1951 Mediterranean Games.

== Participating teams ==
The following countries have participated for the final tournament:

Federation	Nation
CAF Africa	Egypt (hosts)
AFC Asia	Syria
UEFA Europe	Greece

== Venues ==
Cities	Venues	Capacity
Alexandria	Alexandria Stadium	15,000

== Standings ==
Rank	Team	Pld	W	D	L	GF	GA	GD	Pts
1	Greece	2	2	0	0	6	0	+6	4
2	Egypt	2	1	0	1	8	2	+6	2
3	Syria	2	0	0	2	0	12	–12	0

== Matches ==
All times local : CET (UTC+2)

14 October 1951

Greece	4–0	Syria
Lekatsas 18', 23', 71'; Mouratis 75' (pen.)

Alexandria Stadium, Alexandria, Egypt
Attendance: 10,000
Referee: Mohammed Al-Sayed (Egypt)

16 October 1951

Egypt	8–0	Syria
El-Mekkawi; El-Dhizui; El-Guindi; Rached; Abdel Mawla (pen.)

Alexandria Stadium, Alexandria, Egypt

18 October 1951

Egypt	0–2	Greece
		Kotridis 10'; Lekatsas 53'

Alexandria Stadium, Alexandria, Egypt
Attendance: 20,000
Referee: Fauzi Tello (Syria)

== Winner ==
1951 Mediterranean Games

Greece
First title

== Statistics ==
=== Goalscorers ===
There were 14 goals scored in 3 matches, for an average of 4.67 goals per match.

4 goals

- (Greece) Nikos Lekatsas

2 goals

- (Egypt) El-Sayed El-Dhizui
- (Egypt) Mohamed El Guendi
- (Egypt) Saad Rached

1 goal

- (Egypt) Hamza Abdel-Moula
- (Egypt) Ahmed Nabih El-Mekkawi
- (Greece) Babis Kotridis
- (Greece) Andreas Mouratis
