= Fahd =

Fahd (Arabic: فهد, "leopard" or "cheetah"), also transliterated Fahed or Fahad, may refer to:

== Given name ==
=== Fahad ===
- Fahad Ag Almahmoud (died 2024), Malian Tuareg militant
- Fahad Ali (born 1987), Indian television actor
- Fahad Babar (born 1992), Pakistani born American cricketer
- Fahad Belal Al-Salik (born 1991), Saudi basketball player
- Fahad Albutairi (born 1985), Saudi stand-up comedian
- Fahad Ensour (born 1934), Jordanian politician
- Fahad Fazil (born 1982), Indian actor
- Fahad al Hajeri (born 1991), Kuwaiti footballer
- Fahad al-Kubaisi (born 1981), Qatari singer
- Fahad Mua’adzam Shah (born 1994), Malaysian prince
- Fahad Mustafa (born 1983), Pakistani actor
- Fahad Al-Muwallad (born 1994), Saudi football player
- Fahad Talib (born 1994), Iraqi football player
- Fahad Tariq (born 1990), Emirati cricketer
- Fahad Thani (born 1973), Qatari footballer
- Fahad Usman (born 1976), UAE cricketer
- Fahad Yasin Haji Dahir (born 1978), Somali politician

=== Fahd ===
- Fahd of Saudi Arabia (1921–2005), king of Saudi Arabia, 1982–2005
- Fahd Aktaou (born 1993), Dutch footballer
- Fahd Aodi (born 1982), Syrian footballer
- Fahd El Bahja (born 1993), Italian footballer
- Fahd bin Abdul Rahman Balghunaim (born 1952), Saudi engineer
- Fahd Ballan (1933–1997), popular Syrian Druze singer
- Fahd Al-Bishi (born 1965), Saudi footballer
- Fahd Jassem al-Freij (born 1950), Syrian politician and minister
- Fahd Gomaa (born 1999), Egyptian footballer
- Fahd Al-Hamdan (1966–2013), Saudi footballer
- Fahd Hariri (born 1980/81), Lebanese businessman
- Fahd Al-Hayyan (1971–2023), Saudi Arabian actor
- Fahd Jaradat (1930–2015), Jordanian soldier and politician
- Fahd Faraj al-Juwair (1969–2006), high-ranking member of al-Qaeda
- Fahd El Khoumisti (born 1993), French footballer
- Fahd Al-Mehallel (born 1970), Saudi footballer
- Fahd Al-Mesmary (born 2004), Libyan footballer
- Fahd Moufi (born 1996), French-Moroccan footballer
- Fahd Ndzengue (born 2000), Gabonese footballer
- Fahd Al-Qadi (1957–2019), Saudi Islamic scholar
- Fahd Qawasmi (1934–1984), Palestinian engineer and politician
- Fahd al-Quso (1974–2012), Yemeni Islamist terrorist
- Fahd Al-Rasheed, Saudi businessman
- Fahd bin Mahmoud al Said (1940–2026), deputy prime minister of the Sultanate of Oman
- Fahd Saleh (born 1985), Syrian footballer
- Fahd bin Abdullah Al Saud (born 1948), Saudi royal and former deputy defense minister
- Fahd bin Abdullah bin Mohammed Al Saud (born 1941), Saudi minister of defense
- Fahd bin Badr Al Saud, Saudi politician
- Fahd bin Muqrin Al Saud, Saudi businessman
- Fahd bin Salman Al Saud (1955–2001), Saudi royal and businessman
- Fahd bin Saud Al Saud (1923–2006), Saudi royal and businessman
- Fahd bin Sultan Al Saud (born 1950), Saudi royal and governor of Tabuk Province
- Fahd bin Turki Al Saud (born 1959), Saudi prince
- Fahd Youssef (born 1987), Syrian footballer

=== Fahed ===
- Fahed Attal (born 1985), Palestinian football player
- Fahed Boodai, Kuwaiti investment banker and businessman
- Fahed Dermech (born 1966), Tunisian footballer
- Fahed Masoud (born 1980), Emirati footballer
- Fahed Al-Mobarak (born 1984), Saudi footballer
- Fahed Al-Mofarij (born 1978), Saudi footballer
- Fahed Salem (born 1953), Kuwaiti judoka

== Surname ==
=== Fahad ===
- Ghanima Al-Fahad (born 1973), Kuwaiti media personality
- Abrar Fahad (1998–2019), Bengali murder victim

=== Fahed ===
- Rony Fahed (born 1981), Lebanese basketball player

== Nickname ==
- Fahad, nom de guerre of Yusuf Salman Yusuf (1901–1949), Iraqi communist leader

== Other uses ==
- Fahd (armored personnel carrier), a 4x4 Egyptian armored personnel carrier
- Al-Fahd, a Saudi armored vehicle
- Al Fahd 300, an Iraqi missile

== See also ==
- King Fahd (disambiguation), places and institution carrying King Fahd name
- Fahad, Khuzestan, village in Iran
- Fahda (name)
