= Fadia =

Fadia can be either a given name or a surname of Arabic origin. It is the feminine form of the names Fadi and Fady, which are quite common in Arab countries, especially in the Gulf, while the feminine name Fadia is quite rare but mostly found in Morocco. The name Fadia derives from the Arabic verb fada and means "savior" or "one who sacrifices herself for others." There is also a variant, Fahdia, which combines the names Fadia and Fahda. There was also an important family of Roman plebeian origin that was called this, the Fadia gens. Famous people with the name Fadia include:

== Given name ==
- Women of the Fadia gens
  - Fadia (83 BC–30 BC), first wife of Roman general Mark Antony
- Princess Fadia of Egypt (1943–2002), youngest daughter of the late King Farouk of Egypt
- Fadia Najeeb Thabet, Yemeni child protection officer
- Fadia Faqir (born 1956), Jordanian British author
- Fadia Omrani (born 1984), Tunisian handball player

== Surname ==
- Ankit Fadia (born 1985), Indian author, speaker, television host, and hacker
