= Gomaa (name) =

Gomaa (and its variant Gumaa) is a surname and a masculine given name. Notable people with the name include:

== Surname ==
- Abdallah Gomaa (born 1996), Egyptian football player
- Abdallah Gomaa Awad (born 1993), Egyptian football player
- Ahmed Gomaa (born 1988), Egyptian football player
- Ali Gomaa (born 1952), Egyptian Islamic scholar and jurist
- Fahd Gomaa (born 1999), Egyptian football player
- Hossameldin Gomaa (born 1984), Egyptian volleyball player
- Mohamed Adel Gomaa (born 1993), Egyptian football player
- Numan Gumaa (1937–2014), Egyptian attorney and politician
- Saleh Gomaa (born 1993), Egyptian football player
- Sharawi Gomaa (1920–1988), Egyptian military officer and politician
- Wael Gomaa (born 1975), Egyptian football player

== Given name ==
- Gomaa Frahat (1941–2021), Egyptian cartoonist
- Gumaa Al-Shawan (1937–2011), Egyptian spy
- Mirgaani Gomaa Rizgalla (born 1946), Sudanese boxer
