= Fadi =

Fadi (also spelled Fahdi or Fadhi; Arabic: فادي) is an Arabic name meaning "redeemer or savior".It is common among Arab Christians but is also used among Muslims. Fady and Fadey are similar names. Fadia is the female equivalent. Notable people with the name include:

== Given name ==
- Fadi Abboud (born 1955), Lebanese businessman and politician
- Fadi Afash (born 1974), Syrian footballer
- Fadee Andrawos (born 1981), Lebanese singer and actor of Palestinian origin
- Fadi Frem (born 1953), Lebanese politician
- Fadi Ghosn (born 1979), Lebanese footballer
- Fadi Hammadeh (born 1972), Syrian race car driver
- Fadi Kattan (born c. 1978), Palestinian chef
- Fadi El Khatib (born 1979), Lebanese basketball player
- Fadi Makki (born 1968), Lebanese businessman and politician

== Fictional characters ==
- Fadi, fictional character in the Robert Ludlum novel The Bourne Betrayal
