= Ahmed Elmsmari =

Libyan footballer (born 2006)

Personal information
- Full name: Ahmed Fakhri Adem Elmsmari
- Date of birth: 21 January 2006 (age 20)
- Position: Forward

Youth career
- Atlético Madrid
- 2022–2024: Rayo Vallecano
- 2024–2025: Barcelona

International career^{‡}
Years	Team	Apps	(Gls)
2022	Libya U17	2	(1)
2024	Libya U20	4	(0)
- ‡ National team caps and goals as of 22:00, 25 March 2025 (UTC)

Ahmed Fakhri Adem Elmsmari (Arabic: أحمد المسماري; born 21 January 2006) is a Libyan footballer.

== Club career ==
Having played in the academies of Atlético Madrid and Rayo Vallecano, Elmsmari signed for Barcelona's youth sector in August 2024.

== International career ==
Elmsmari was called up to the full Libya national football team in August 2024 for games against Benin and Nigeria. Having not featured in these games, he was instead called up to the nation's under-20 side for the 2024 UNAF U-20 Tournament in November 2024. Libya assistant coach Abu Bakr Al-Harak later clarified that Elmsmari had not featured for the senior side yet as he was not physically ready.
