= Jalal Damja =

Libyan footballer and coach

Personal information
- Full name: Jalal Al-Damja
- Date of birth: 1966 (age 59–60)
- Place of birth: Tripoli, Libya

Youth career
- 1977–1982: Mezran

Senior career*
Years	Team	Apps	(Gls)
1982–?	Mezran		
?–1999	Al-Wahda FC		

International career
1984–1999	Libya	50	(?)

Managerial career
- 2016–2017: Libya
- 2019: Libya
- * Club domestic league appearances and goals

Jamal Damja (Arabic: جلال الدامجة; born 1966) is a Libyan football coach.

== Libya ==
Damja was assigned the Libya head coach role in October 2016 after previous manager Javier Clemente led the Mediterranean Knights to a dispiriting loss against DR Congo, the penultimate 2018 world cup qualifier they played that year. Taking charge a week before Libya's last qualifier facing Tunisia, he lost his first match at the national team's helm 1-0, placing them at the bottom of their group. Responding to their run of results, Damja blamed the fact that all of their fixtures were not staged in Libya due to the dissension that has beset the country for decades so they would never have home advantage. His contract expired in November 2017 and he was replaced by assistant Amer Almalmi.

He was reappointed in 2019 following Libya's failure to qualify for the 2019 Africa Cup of Nations. Later on, he resigned on 24 October 2019.
