= Libya national football team =

Men's association football team

Libya
- Nickname(s): فُرْسَانُ الْمُتَوَّسِط, Fursan al-Mutawasit (The Mediterranean Knights)
- Association: Libyan Football Federation (LFF)
- Confederation: CAF (Africa)
- Sub-confederation: UNAF (North Africa)
- Head coach: Youssoupha Dabo
- Captain: Moatasem Al-Musrati
- Most caps: Ahmed Saad Osman (80)
- Top scorer: Ahmed Ben Soueid (50)
- Home stadium: Tripoli Stadium
- FIFA code: LBY
First colours	Second colours

FIFA ranking
- Current: 106 ▲7 (18 November 2026)
- Highest: 36 (September 2012)
- Lowest: 187 (July 1997)

First international
- Libya 5–2 Palestine (Alexandria, Egypt; 3 August 1953)

Biggest win
- Libya 21–0 Muscat and Oman (Baghdad, Iraq; 6 April 1966)

Biggest defeat
- Egypt 10–2 Libya (Alexandria, Egypt; 6 August 1953)

Africa Cup of Nations
- Appearances: 3 (first in 1982)
- Best result: Runners-up (1982)
Medal record
Men's Football
Africa Cup of Nations
Silver medal – second place	1982 Libya
African Nations Championship
Gold medal – first place	2014 South Africa
Mediterranean Games
Bronze medal – third place	2005 Almería
Bronze medal – third place	2009 Pescara

The Libya national football team (Arabic: منتخب لِيْبيَا لِكُرَّةُ الْقَدَم) represents Libya in men's international football and is controlled by the Libyan Football Federation. The team has never qualified for FIFA World Cup but has qualified for editions of the Africa Cup of Nations in 1982, 2006 and 2012. In 1982, the team was both the host and runner-up. In the Arab Cup, Libya finished second in 1964 and 2012, and third in 1966. The team is affiliated with both FIFA and Confederation of African Football (CAF).

Due to political circumstances, Libya has typically been less successful in international competition compared to other North African teams like Algeria, Morocco, Egypt and Tunisia. Libya has never qualified for the FIFA World Cup and its participation in AFCON is sporadic, having only qualified for three AFCON editions.

In the 2010s, Libya's global ranking improved due to the increasing number of Libyan players playing in foreign leagues. At the 2012 Africa Cup of Nations, the team recorded their first-ever win in the tournament outside Libya. Their FIFA world ranking rose to a high of 36 in September 2012; Libya then won a gold medal in the 2014 African Nations Championship. However, the Libyan Civil War caused the stoppage of the Libyan Premier League and severely disrupted domestic affairs. Libya was eliminated in the first round of the 2015 Africa Cup of Nations qualification by Rwanda and failed to qualify for the 2016 African Nations Championship as the defending champions.

== History ==
=== Early history ===
Libya's national team was first initiated in 1918, but did not play an official international until 3 August 1953, when they defeated Palestine 5–2 in the first Arab Games in 1953. The team's first manager was Masoud Zantouny, and the first foreign manager was Englishman James Bingham, who took charge of the Libyan national team for the 1961 Arab Games. The first player ever to score for the Libyan national team in an official international was Mukhtar Ghonaay.

The first penalty ever scored by a member of the national team was in the 1953 Arab Games group stage; in the match against Egypt, Ali Zantouny scored in the 3–2 defeat. The national team's first participation in the Arab Cup was in 1964, the second edition of the competition, held in Kuwait.

The first ever player to score for the Libyan national team in a non-official international was Mustapha Makki in a warm-up friendly played prior to the 1953 Arab Games tournament, played against Palestine in Alexandria in 1952. The national team's first attempt to qualify for an Olympic football tournament was in 1967, where they played their first qualification match against Niger in an attempt to qualify for the 1968 Olympic football tournament in Mexico City.

=== World Cups ===
Libya first entered the FIFA World Cup qualifiers in 1970. Their early attempts failed, but during the 1980s the national side strengthened. The country's geopolitical position, however, affected the football team, who had to withdraw from qualifying for the 1982 and 1990 World Cups.

Libya came closest to qualifying for the World Cup in 1986. They came to within a game of reaching the finals in Mexico. After winning their match against Sudan in their first game, the Libyans beat Ghana in the next round before taking on Morocco for a place at the finals. Morocco won the first game 3–0 and went through, even though Libya won the return leg 1–0.

After not entering the 1994 and 1998 FIFA World Cup competition, Libya came back in the qualifying competition for Korea/Japan. The Libyans advanced to the second round at the expense of Mali, who were beaten 4–3 on aggregate. In the group stage, Libya managed only two draws in eight games.

In the qualifying for the 2006 FIFA World Cup, a 9–0 two-legged victory against São Tome and Principe put the Libyans through to the group stage. Libyan player Al-Saadi Gaddafi was banned from the team after failing a drug test.

A difficult group followed containing Egypt, Cameroon and Ivory Coast, the eventual group winners and qualifiers for the World Cup. However, The Knights were able to secure good results against these sides, as they beat Egypt 2–1 in Tripoli, and held Cameroon and Ivory Coast to 0–0 draws, helping them to a 4th-place finish and a place at the 2006 African Cup of Nations finals in Egypt.

During the qualifying campaign for the 2010 FIFA World Cup, Libya defeated each side in the second round during home matches (they also defeated Lesotho away). However they were defeated by Gabon in an away match, and failed to qualify to the next round on goal difference.

In the qualifying campaign for the 2014 FIFA World Cup, Libya reached the final match in the group stage without a defeat. They were defeated 1–0 by Cameroon and failed to advance to the final round.

In the qualifying campaign for the 2018 FIFA World Cup, Libya defeated Rwanda 4–1 on aggregate in the second round but were eliminated after losing the first three matches in the group stages.

=== African Cup Of Nations ===
==== Libya 1982 ====
The biggest football tournament to be held in Libya was the 1982 African Cup of Nations. Libya qualified automatically as hosts and were put in a group alongside Ghana, Cameroon and Tunisia. The opening match of the tournament saw the hosts take on Ghana in Tripoli in a 2–2 draw. A 2–0 win over Tunisia and a goalless draw against Cameroon saw Libya topping the group.

In the semi-finals, Libya came from behind to beat Zambia 2–1 and set up another match with Ghana, this time in the final on 19 March. Ghana scored first in the 35th minute, but Libya equalised in the 70th. This was followed by a tense period of extra time in which no goals were scored. In a long penalty shootout, Ghana came out triumphant 7–6.

==== Egypt 2006 ====
Libya's second African Cup of Nations saw a return to the higher levels of the international footballing scene at the 2006 African Cup of Nations finals in Egypt. They qualified for the competition after a goalless draw with Sudan in their ninth qualifying match.

Libya were drawn in Group A with Egypt (the hosts and eventual winners), 2006 World Cup-qualifiers Ivory Coast and Morocco. Libya lost 3–0 to Egypt in Cairo, then lost 2–1 to Ivory Coast. A goalless draw against Morocco saw Libya finish bottom of the group.

=== Post-Gaddafi era ===
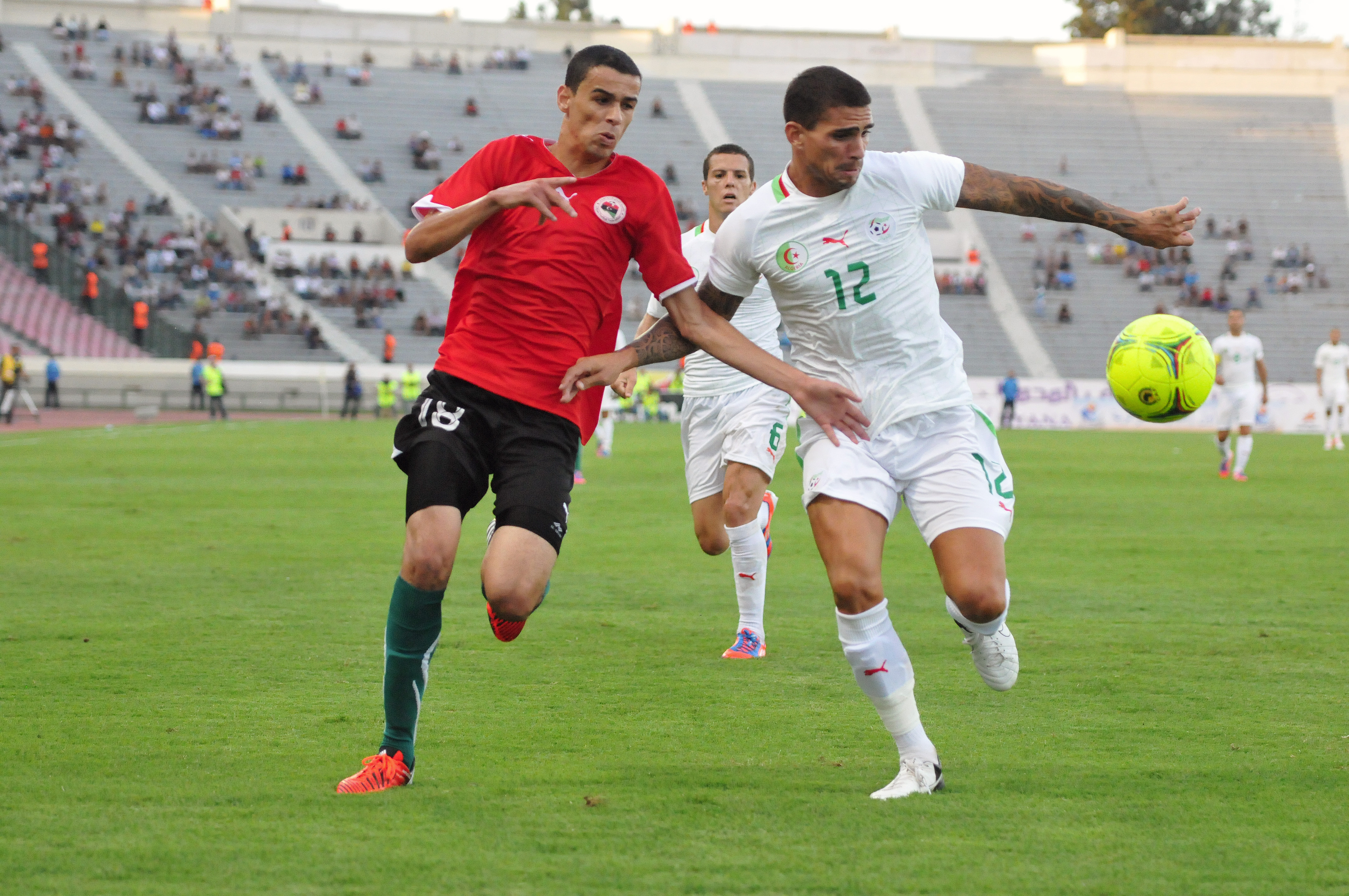
The national football team of Libya versus Algeria in 2013

Libya played its first match after the Battle of Tripoli (and thus the end of the Gaddafi era in Libya) on 3 September 2011, with a new uniform sporting the National Transitional Council flag of Libya.

The match, part of the 2012 Africa Cup of Nations qualification campaign, resulted in a 1–0 victory over Mozambique. The historic goal was scored by Rabee'a al Laafi. Like Libya's previous home match, a 3–0 defeat of Comoros in qualifying, played in Stade 26 mars in Bamako, Mali, a relocation was necessary due to the ongoing Libyan Civil War, and so the Petro Sport Stadium in Cairo, Egypt became the venue. The match was played behind closed doors for security reasons.

Prior to the team's final game in the qualification campaign, against Zambia, coach Marcos Paquetá claimed that the team was now "not only playing for football success but for a new government and a new country". The match was played on 8 October 2011, and resulted in a 0–0 draw which was good enough for both teams to qualify. Paquetá and his team danced and celebrated afterwards.

In November 2011 the team travelled to the United Arab Emirates to play a friendly match against Belarus organized by FIFA and broadcast Dubai Sports. The team members, along with the Libyan national chess team, also attended an event at the Libyan Consulate in Dubai organized to honour their contribution to their country in the field of sports.

On 7 June 2013, Libya met DR Congo in its first match on home ground in two years.

==== 2012 Africa Cup of Nations ====
Having qualified, Libya were drawn into Group A with co-hosts Equatorial Guinea, qualification rivals Zambia and pre-tournament favourites Senegal.

The Mediterranean Knights' first game, the tournament's opening match, saw them lose to an 87th-minute winner from ex-Real Madrid winger Javier Ángel Balboa. Libya went on to secure a 2–2 draw with Zambia in terrible conditions at the Estadio de Bata, before two goals from Ihaab al Bousseffi guided them to a 2–1 victory over Senegal, their first Nations Cup win in 30 years and a first on foreign soil. After four points from three games Libya was eliminated at the group stage.

==== 2014 African Nations Championship Final ====
Libya played Ghana in the 2014 CHAN final. Extra time was given (two 15 minutes), however both teams failed to score. It was taken to penalty shootouts, where the Libyan team scored the first three penalties, missed two others and scored the final sixth and their Ghanaian opponents missed the first two, scored the next three then missed the final sixth penalty (resulting in 3 penalties scored). The match finished (0–0) and was won by the Mediterranean Knights by penalties (4–3).

==== Coaching crisis ====
After Javier Clemente's dismissal in 2016, Jalal Damja took over the national team. He left in 2017 after his contract expired. Omar Almaryami was later appointed as coach and led Libya to the semi-finals of the 2018 African Nations Championship. After Libya's elimination by Morocco, Adel Amrouche was appointed in May 2018. His goal was to help Libya qualify for the 2019 Africa Cup of Nations. He led Libya to a 0–0 draw against South Africa away from home. However, days before Libya's match against Nigeria, Amrouche suddenly left the team's camp and later resigned. During an interview with Reuters, Amrouche said that the reason for his resignation was that the Libyan Football Federation was repeatedly interfering with his work as a coach. He also cited unpaid wages as a reason for his resignation.

Omar Almaryami was again appointed as a caretaker coach of Libya. The team lost twice to Nigeria (4–0 away, 3–2 home) and Almaryami was replaced by former striker Fawzi Al-Issawi, who led Libya to an 8–1 away win over Seychelles. However, Libya later lost to South Africa 2–1, and Libya failed to qualify for the 2019 Africa Cup of Nations. It was noted during the match that al-Issawi's assistant, Abu Bakr Bani was the one who made substitutions and instructed players, leaving many to wonder who was the actual coach.

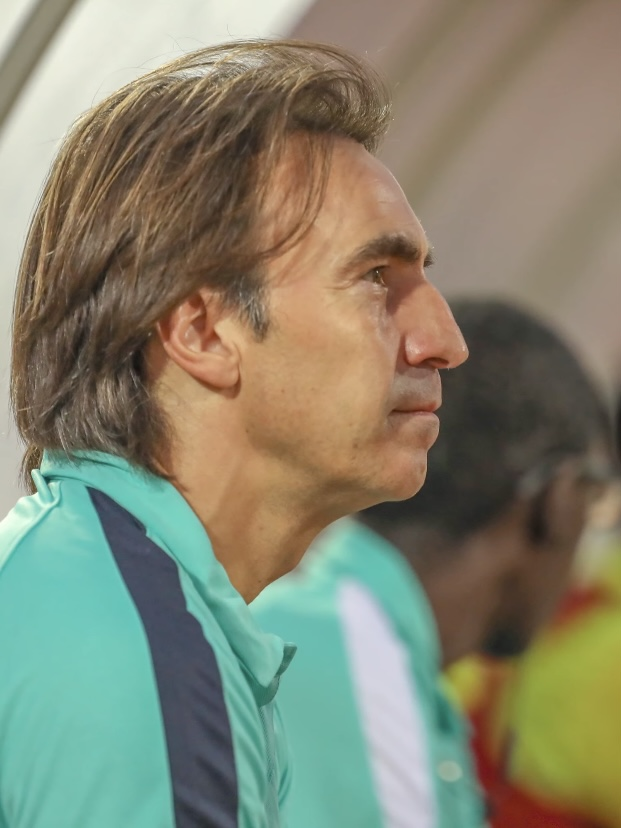
Corentin Martins became the manager of the national football team of Libya in 2022

After the match against South Africa, Jalal Damja was reappointed as the head coach for temporary matches in the 2021 Africa Cup of Nations qualification before Faouzi Benzarti was named as new coach of Libya. Under Benzarti, Libya opened their campaign with a disastrous 1–4 loss to Tunisia, the home of Benzarti, before managed to salvage an important 2–1 win over Tanzania to gain hope for qualifying to an AFCON tournament since 2012. Yet, managerial crisis once again erupted when Benzarti left the team and Libya had to appoint a local coach, Ali El Margini, in charge against Equatorial Guinea, a team that had not won a single game in the qualification. Internal instability proved to be a rupture, as Libya lost two consecutive games against the Central African opponent and fell out of top two position. El Margini left after losing all three of his games in charge. He was replaced by Zoran Filipović, who led a team of domestic players into the 2020 African Nations Championship. Libya were eliminated in the group stage after two draws and a loss in three games. Defeats in their final two AFCON qualifiers saw Filipovic sacked in May 2021. Javier Clemente was reappointed as head coach shortly afterwards.

== Kits ==
In the Gaddafi era the National team used to play its home matches wearing the green coloured kit representing the Flag of Libyan Arab Jamahiriya. However, after the Libyan Civil War in 2011, Libya changed its flag to the new one which was used from 1951 to 1969 back when Libya was a Kingdom. This change resulted in changing the national team's kit in order to represent the new flag. The team played its home matches with colours: Red, Black and Green (as in the flag). Red dominates the strip and is the sole jersey colour. The away colours were white in both eras. Since 2011, the LFF emblem and the national team's badge was changed into the current design. The previous badge was two balls in front of green coloured Libya's map which is also in front of a sun.

During late 2011 and early 2012 the Libyan team wore white jerseys temporarily in their qualification games and 2012 Africa Cup of Nations. However, in mid-2012 the team began to use red jerseys. In 2014, Libya replaced the green socks worn by the players with black ones.

Adidas is the supplier of the official team strip.

== Home stadium ==
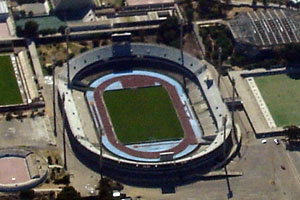
Tripoli Stadium

The Tripoli Stadium is a multi-purpose stadium in Tripoli, Libya. It can hold 80,000 spectators.

It was the main venue used by the Libyan national football team in its FIFA World Cup and African Nations Cup qualifying matches as well as friendlies and other international games.

The stadium hosted many games of the 1982 African Cup of Nations held in Libya along with the 28 March Stadium in Benghazi.

The 28 March Stadium in Benghazi was also used by the national team sometimes.

FIFA lifted the ban on Libyan stadiums in 2013, during the 2014 FIFA World Cup qualification. However, it was re-imposed in 2014 due to increased security concerns. The Libyan national team was forced to host games in neighboring countries such as Algeria, Morocco, Egypt or Tunisia (Tunisia the most popular choice due to its close distance to Libya).

Libya played their first home game since 2013 at the Martyrs of February Stadium in Benghazi against Tunisia on 25 March 2021, where they lost 2–5.

== Rivalries ==
Libya's only real rivalries are with its fellow North African footballing nations, Algeria, Morocco, Egypt and, mainly, Tunisia. Matches between Libya and any one of these opponents are highly charged encounters. Libya defeated Egypt 2–1 in a World Cup qualifier on 8 October 2004, the Pharaohs only managed to beat the Libyans on their own turf twice. The rivalry was rekindled at the 2007 Arab Games, where the teams drew 0–0; Egypt eventually claimed the gold medal on goal difference from the Libyans.

Libya also has a rivalry with Morocco. Libya's last win against Morocco was during the 1986 World Cup qualifiers, which Libya won 1–0. A friendly was played between both countries on the 11th of October 2019 in which they tied. Matches between Libya and Tunisia are also very tense, the last time they played was a 5–2 win from the latter in the African Cup of Nations qualification group stage round.

== Results and fixtures ==
The following is a list of match results in the last 12 months, as well as any future matches that have been scheduled.

Win Draw Loss Fixture

=== 2025 ===
15 November Friendly	Libya	1–0	Mauritania	Benina, Libya
16:00 UTC+2	Mahmoud Al-Shalwi 31'	Report		Stadium: Benina Martyrs Stadium

25 November 2025 Arab Cup qualifiers	Palestine	0–0 (4–3 p)	Libya	Al Rayyan, Qatar
19:00 UTC+3		Report		Stadium: Al Gharafa Stadium; Referee: Mario Escobar (Guatemala)
	Penalties
	Dabagh (penalty scored); Hemdan (penalty scored); Saleh (penalty scored); Termanini (penalty missed); Mahajna (penalty scored)		(penalty missed) Yusuf; (penalty scored) Ali; (penalty scored) Taqtaq; (penalty scored) Tajouri; (penalty missed) Al Hbeishi

=== 2026 ===
27 March Friendly	Libya	0–0	Niger	Casablanca, Morocco
19:00 UTC+1		Report		Stadium: Larbi Zaouli Stadium; Referee: Mustapha Kech Chaf (Morocco)

31 March Friendly	Liberia	2–2	Libya	Casablanca, Morocco
16:00 UTC+1	Dorley 76'; P. Balde 82'	Report	El Maremi 44'; Al-Musrati 45+1'	Stadium: Larbi Zaouli Stadium; Referee: Hamza El Fariq (Morocco)

24 September 2027 AFCON qualification	Libya	2–2	Botswana	Tripoli, Libya
15:00 UTC+0	Alhibeeshi 87'; El Maremi 90+6' (pen.)	Report	Orebonye 30', 42'	Stadium: Tripoli International Olympic Stadium; Referee: Jean Pierre Nguiene Bissila (Congo)

29 September 2027 AFCON qualification	Uganda	1–0	Libya	Hoima, Uganda
18:00 UTC+0	Vula 45+2'	Report		Stadium: Hoima City Stadium; Referee: Naby Laye Touré (Guinea)

13 November 2027 AFCON qualification	Tunisia	0–2	Libya	Sfax, Tunisia
17:00 UTC+1		Report	Youssef 44' (pen.); Elhouni 62'	Stadium: Taieb Mhiri Stadium; Referee: Hamza El Fariq (Morocco)

17 November 2027 AFCON qualification	Libya	1–1	Tunisia	Tripoli, Libya
18:00 UTC+2	El Maremi 45+5' (pen.)	Report	Ben Slimane 3'	Stadium: Tripoli Stadium; Attendance: 0 (Behind closed doors); Referee: Raphiou Ligali (Benin)

=== 2027 ===
24 March 2027 AFCON qualification	Botswana	v	Libya	TBD, Botswana
TBD				Stadium: TBD

28 March 2027 AFCON qualification	Libya	v	Uganda	TBD, Libya
TBD				Stadium: TBD

== Coaching history ==
- (Libya) Massoud Zantouny (1953)
- (Libya) Salim Faraj Balteb (1957–1960)
- (England) James Benjeham (1961)
- (England) Billy Elliott (1961–1963)
- (Socialist Federal Republic of Yugoslavia) Vojin Božović (1964–1965)
- (England) George Skinner (1965–1966)
- (Algeria) Mokhtar Arribi (1966–1967)
- (England) Keith Spurgeon (1967–1968)
- (Libya) Ali Zantouny (1968–1969)
- (Socialist Federal Republic of Yugoslavia) Milan Selbetishi (1969–1970)
- (England) George Ainsley (1970–1971)
- (Romania) Nicolae Oaidă (1971–1972)
- (Libya) Hassan Al-Amer (1972)
- (Romania) Titus Ozon (1972–1974)
- (Libya) Mohammed El-Khamisi (1974–1975)
- (Libya) Abed Ali Al-Aqili (1975–1976)
- (Libya) Mohammed El-Khamisi (1976–1977)
- (Libya) Ali Al-Zaqori (1977–1978)
- (England) Ron Bradley (1978–1980)
- (Libya) Mohammed El-Khamisi (1980–1982)
- (Hungary) Béla Göltl (1982)
- (Romania) Cicerone Manolache (1983–1984)
- (Libya) Mohammed El-Khamisi (1984)
- (Libya) Hashimi El-Bahlul (1984–1986)
- (Libya) Mohammed El-Khamisi (1988–1989)
- (Libya) Ahmed Ben Soueid (1989)
- (Libya) Hashimi El-Bahlul (1991–1997)
- (Romania) Ion Moldovan (1998)
- (Scotland) Danny McLennan (1998)
- (Italy) Eugenio Bersellini (1998–1999)
- (Argentina) Carlos Bilardo (1999–2000)
- (Argentina) Miguel Angel Lemme (2000–2001)
- (Italy) Francesco Scoglio (2002)
- (Croatia) Ilija Lončarević (2003–2004)
- (Libya) Mohammed El-Khamisi (2004–2005)
- (Croatia) Ilija Lončarević (2005–2006)
- (Egypt) Mohsen Saleh (2006)
- (Libya) Abou Bakr Bani (2006–2007)
- (Tunisia) Faouzi Benzarti (2007–2009)
- (Serbia) Branko Smiljanić (2009–2010)
- (Brazil) Marcos Paquetá (2010–2012)
- (Libya) Abdul-Hafeedh Arbeesh (2012–2013)
- (Spain) Javier Clemente (2013–2016)
- (Libya) Jalal Damja (2016–2017)
- (Algeria) Adel Amrouche (2017–2018)
- (Libya) Fawzi Al-Issawi (2018–2019)
- (Libya) Jalal Damja (2019)
- (Tunisia) Faouzi Benzarti (2019–2020)
- (Libya) Ali El Margini (2020)
- (Montenegro) Zoran Filipović (2020–2021)
- (Spain) Javier Clemente (2021–2022)
- (Spain) Ramon Catala (2022)
- (France) Corentin Martins (2022–2023)
- (Libya) Hamdi Bataw (2023)
- (Libya) Salim Al-Jalali (interim, 2023)
- (Serbia) Milutin Sredojević (2023–2024)
- (Libya) Nasser Al-Hadrininew (interim, 2024–2025)
- (Senegal) Aliou Cissé (2025–2026)
- (Senegal) Youssoupha Dabo (2026–)

== Players ==
=== Current squad ===
The following players were called up for the 2027 Africa Cup of Nations qualification matches against Tunisia in November 2026.

Caps and goals correct as of 17 November 2026, after the match against Tunisia.

No.	Pos.	Player	Date of birth (age)	Caps	Goals	Club
1	GK	Murad Al-Wuheeshi	28 February 1997 (age 29)	31	0	(Libyan Football Federation) Al-Ahly Benghazi
12	GK	Mohammed Al-Ghannai	19 October 2001 (age 25)	0	0	(Libyan Football Federation) Olympic Azzaweya
22	GK	Ayman Al-Tihar	27 April 2002 (age 24)	10	0	(Libyan Football Federation) Al-Ahli Tripoli
2	DF	Mohammed Al-Ajnaf	6 September 1999 (age 27)	1	0	(Libyan Football Federation) Al-Ahli Tripoli
3	DF	Subhi Al-Dhawi	8 June 2004 (age 22)	19	1	(Libyan Football Federation) Al-Ittihad Tripoli
4	DF	Ali Youssef	7 September 2001 (age 25)	34	1	(Libyan Football Federation) Al-Ittihad Tripoli
5	DF	Ibrahim Bourouis	10 February 1999 (age 27)	2	0	(Libyan Football Federation) Al-Madina
6	DF	Saif Jaddour	18 December 1998 (age 27)	9	0	(Libyan Football Federation) Asswehly
13	DF	Mohammed Khalil	13 December 2001 (age 24)	2	0	(Libyan Football Federation) Al Ahli Tripoli
17	DF	Fadel Salama	21 February 2002 (age 24)	31	2	(Libyan Football Federation) Al-Ittihad Tripoli
27	DF	Daniel Elfadli	6 April 1997 (age 29)	6	1	(Austrian Football Association) LASK
	DF	Abdelaziz Al-Suwaei	4 February 1997 (age 29)	12	0	(Libyan Football Federation) Al-Ahli Tripoli
	DF	Ahmed Huwaydi	26 February 1994 (age 32)	5	0	(Libyan Football Federation) Asswehly
8	MF	Mahmoud Al-Shalwi	8 August 2001 (age 25)	8	2	(Libyan Football Federation) Al-Ittihad Tripoli
10	MF	Muaid Ellafi	7 March 1996 (age 30)	43	9	(Libyan Football Federation) Al-Ahli Tripoli
11	MF	Abdullah Al-Orfey	24 July 1994 (age 32)	2	0	(Libyan Football Federation) Asswehly
14	MF	Alaa Al-Qajdar	19 February 1998 (age 28)	2	0	(Libyan Football Federation) Al-Nasr Benghazi
16	MF	Bashir Al-Hibeeshi	28 October 2003 (age 23)	9	1	(Libyan Football Federation) Al-Ahli Tripoli
18	MF	Hussein Taktak	20 April 2002 (age 24)	9	1	(Libyan Football Federation) Al-Ahly Benghazi
20	MF	Osamah Al-Shuraimi	20 February 2001 (age 25)	30	1	(Tunisian Football Federation) Club Africain
	MF	Ahmad Benali	7 February 1992 (age 34)	13	0	(Libyan Football Federation) Al-Ittihad Tripoli
	MF	Hamza Al-Mugsi	28 February 2003 (age 23)	0	0	(Libyan Football Federation) Al-Ittihad Tripoli
7	FW	Mohamed Al-Tubal	23 June 1993 (age 33)	35	0	(Libyan Football Federation) Al-Ittihad Tripoli
9	FW	Ezoo El Maremi	22 August 1998 (age 28)	17	7	(Libyan Football Federation) Al-Ahli Tripoli
15	FW	Amjed Al-Gsheim	26 April 1999 (age 27)	4	0	(Libyan Football Federation) Asswehly
19	FW	Mouad Eissa	8 May 1999 (age 27)	23	2	(Libyan Football Federation) Asswehly
21	FW	Ahmed Al-Bizi	26 August 2002 (age 24)	7	0	(Libyan Football Federation) Al-Ittihad Tripoli
26	FW	Ismael Tajouri-Shradi	28 March 1994 (age 32)	14	0	(Libyan Football Federation) Al-Nasr Benghazi
	FW	Hamdou Elhouni	12 February 1994 (age 32)	46	5	(Libyan Football Federation) Al-Ahli Tripoli

=== Recent call-ups ===
The following players have been called up to the Libya squad in the last 12 months.

Pos.	Player	Date of birth (age)	Caps	Goals	Club	Latest call-up
GK	Mohamed Darebi	5 May 2003 (age 23)	1	0	(Libya) Al-Ittihad Tripoli	v. Tunisia, 13 November 2026 ^{INJ}
GK	Jawad Rizq	20 January 1994 (age 32)	0	0	(Libya) Al-Nasr Benghazi	v. Liberia, 31 March 2026
GK	Mouad Al-Mansouri	29 August 1993 (age 33)	0	0	(Libya) Asswehly	2025 FIFA Arab Cup qualification
DF	Ayoub Lajhar	10 July 2004 (age 22)	0	0	(United States) FC Cincinnati	v. Tunisia, 13 November 2026 ^{WD}
DF	Moataz Al-Jurnazi	28 February 2002 (age 24)	2	0	(Libya) Al-Ahly Benghazi	v. Uganda, 29 September 2026
DF	Jumaa Abu Raqiqah	7 December 1997 (age 28)	4	0	(Libya) Al-Ahly Benghazi	v. Liberia, 31 March 2026
DF	Ahmed Saleh	1 January 2001 (age 25)	15	1	(Libya) Asswehly	2025 FIFA Arab Cup qualification
DF	Talal Farhat	8 September 1994 (age 32)	13	0	(Libya) Al-Ittihad Tripoli	2025 FIFA Arab Cup qualification
DF	Mohammed Al-Shiteewi	29 July 1993 (age 33)	4	0	(Libya) Al-Hilal Benghazi	2025 FIFA Arab Cup qualification
DF	Yousef Karah	26 April 2000 (age 26)	3	0	(Libya) Al-Ittihad Tripoli	2025 FIFA Arab Cup qualification
MF	Muhanad Madyen	25 March 1994 (age 32)	25	0	(Libya) Al-Nasr Benghazi	v. Uganda, 29 September 2026
MF	Abdulmunem Okasha	11 January 1997 (age 29)	14	1	(Libya) Asswehly	v. Uganda, 29 September 2026
MF	Ashraf Al-Maghasi	28 March 2001 (age 25)	0	0	(Libya) Al-Ahly Benghazi	v. Uganda, 29 September 2026
MF	Moatasem Al-Musrati	6 April 1996 (age 30)	44	3	(Libya) Al-Ahli Tripoli	v. Liberia, 31 March 2026
MF	Omar Al-Qulaib	13 October 1997 (age 29)	1	0	(Libya) Al-Madina	v. Liberia, 31 March 2026
MF	Farouk Al-Falith	7 February 1999 (age 27)	1	0	(Libya) Al-Madina	v. Liberia, 31 March 2026
MF	Omar El-Harek	12 November 2006 (age 20)	1	0	(Libya) Al-Ahli Tripoli	v. Liberia, 31 March 2026
MF	Abdallah Dagou	21 September 2000 (age 26)	8	0	(Libya) Al-Ahly Benghazi	2025 FIFA Arab Cup qualification
MF	Omran Al-Tawerghi	15 February 1997 (age 29)	3	0	(Libya) Al-Ahli Tripoli	2025 FIFA Arab Cup qualification
FW	Fahd Al-Mesmary	10 June 2004 (age 22)	8	1	(Libya) Al-Ahly Benghazi	v. Uganda, 29 September 2026
FW	Mohamed Bawa	20 July 2004 (age 22)	1	0	(Sweden) GAIS	v. Liberia, 31 March 2026
FW	Ahmed Elmsmari	21 January 2006 (age 20)	0	0	(Spain) Leganés B	v. Liberia, 31 March 2026
Notes: ^{INJ} Withdrew due to injury; ^{PRE} Preliminary squad / standby; ^{WD} Withdrew due to non-injury issue

== Records ==
As of 25 March 2025
Players in bold are still active with Libya.

=== Most appearances ===
Rank	Player	Caps	Goals	Career
1	Ahmed Saad Osman	80	20	2001–2013
2	**Faisal Al Badri**	73	14	2011–present
3	Muhammad Nashnoush	72	0	2011–2021
4	**Motasem Sabbou**	64	2	2013–present
5	Ahmed El Trbi	61	0	2013–2022
6	Younes Al Shibani	60	3	2003–2013
7	**Ali Salama**	59	2	2010–present
8	Muhammad Al Maghrabi	58	4	2006–2013
9	Mohamed Al Ghanodi	55	8	2013–2017
10	Tarik El Taib	54	11	1997–2011

=== Top goalscorers ===
Rank	Name	Goals	Caps	Ratio	Career
1	Ali Al-Biski	35	44	0.8	1961–1970
2	Ahmed Saad Osman	20	80	0.25	2001–2013
3	Ahmed Al Masli	17	32	0.53	1998–2008
4	**Faisal Al Badri**	14	73	0.19	2011–present
5	Tarik El Taib	11	50	0.22	1997–2011
6	Nader Kara	10	34	0.29	2001–2009
7	**Muaid Ellafi**	9	39	0.23	2014–present
8	Mohamed Al Ghanodi	8	54	0.15	2011–2017
9	**Ahmed Krawa'a**	7	20	0.35	2009–present
9	Anis Saltou	7	28	0.25	2013–2023

== Competitive record ==
=== FIFA World Cup ===
FIFA World Cup record									Qualification record					
Year	Round	Position	Pld	W	D*	L	GF	GA	Pld	W	D	L	GF	GA
(Uruguay) 1930	Part of (Italy) Italy								Part of Italy					
(Italy) 1934	Part of (Italy) Italy								Part of Italy					
(France) 1938	Part of (Italy) Italy								Part of Italy					
(Brazil) 1950	Not a FIFA member								Not a FIFA member					
(Switzerland) 1954	Not a FIFA member								Not a FIFA member					
(Sweden) 1958	Not a FIFA member								Not a FIFA member					
(Chile) 1962	Not a FIFA member								Not a FIFA member					
(England) 1966	Withdrew								Withdrew					
(Mexico) 1970	Did not qualify								2	1	0	1	3	5
(West Germany) 1974	Did not enter								Declined participation					
(Argentina) 1978	Did not qualify								2	0	1	1	0	1
(Spain) 1982	Withdrew								2	1	1	0	2	1
(Mexico) 1986	Did not qualify								6	3	2	1	7	3
(Italy) 1990	Withdrew								2	1	0	1	3	2
(United States) 1994	Disqualified								Disqualified					
(France) 1998	Did not enter								Declined participation					
(South Korea) (Japan) 2002	Did not qualify								10	1	2	7	11	22
(Germany) 2006	Did not qualify								12	5	3	4	17	10
(South Africa) 2010	Did not qualify								6	4	0	2	7	4
(Brazil) 2014	Did not qualify								6	2	3	1	5	3
(Russia) 2018	Did not qualify								8	3	1	4	8	11
(Qatar) 2022	Did not qualify								6	2	1	3	4	7
(Canada) (Mexico) (United States) 2026	Did not qualify								10	4	4	2	12	10
(Morocco) (Portugal) (Spain) 2030	To be determined								To be determined					
(Saudi Arabia) 2034	To be determined								To be determined					
Total		0/15							72	27	18	27	79	79

=== Africa Cup of Nations ===
Africa Cup of Nations record									Qualification record					
Year	Round	Position	Pld	W	D	L	GF	GA	Pld	W	D	L	GF	GA
(Sudan) 1957	Not affiliated to CAF								Not affiliated to CAF					
(United Arab Republic) 1959	Not affiliated to CAF								Not affiliated to CAF					
(Ethiopia) 1962	Not affiliated to CAF								Not affiliated to CAF					
(Ghana) 1963	Not affiliated to CAF								Not affiliated to CAF					
(Tunisia) 1965	Not affiliated to CAF								Not affiliated to CAF					
(Ethiopia) 1968	Did not qualify								2	0	1	1	4	5
(Sudan) 1970	Did not enter								Did not enter					
(Cameroon) 1972	Did not qualify								2	0	0	2	1	3
(Egypt) 1974	Withdrew								Withdrew					
(Ethiopia) 1976	Did not enter								Did not enter					
(Ghana) 1978	Did not enter								Did not enter					
(Nigeria) 1980	Did not enter								Did not enter					
(Libya) 1982	Runners-up	2nd	5	2	3	0	7	4	Qualified as hosts					
(Ivory Coast) 1984	Did not qualify								2	1	0	1	2	2
(Egypt) 1986	Did not qualify								4	2	0	2	5	4
(Morocco) 1988	Withdrew								Withdrew					
(Algeria) 1990	Withdrew								Withdrew					
(Senegal) 1992	Did not enter								Did not enter					
(Tunisia) 1994	Did not enter								Did not enter					
(South Africa) 1996	Did not enter								Did not enter					
(Burkina Faso) 1998	Did not enter								Did not enter					
(Ghana) (Nigeria) 2000	Did not qualify								2	0	0	2	1	6
(Mali) 2002	Did not qualify								8	3	0	5	8	14
(Tunisia) 2004	Did not qualify								6	3	1	2	12	8
(Egypt) 2006	Group stage	14th	3	0	1	2	1	5	12	5	3	4	17	10
(Ghana) 2008	Did not qualify								6	2	2	2	7	6
(Angola) 2010	Did not qualify								6	4	0	2	7	4
(Equatorial Guinea) (Gabon) 2012	Group stage	10th	3	1	1	1	4	4	6	3	3	0	6	1
(South Africa) 2013	Did not qualify								2	0	0	2	0	3
(Equatorial Guinea) 2015	Did not qualify								2	0	1	1	0	3
(Gabon) 2017	Did not qualify								6	2	1	3	8	6
(Egypt) 2019	Did not qualify								6	2	1	3	16	11
(Cameroon) 2021	Did not qualify								6	1	0	5	7	15
(Ivory Coast) 2023	Did not qualify								6	1	1	4	2	8
(Morocco) 2025	Did not qualify								6	1	2	3	3	7
(Kenya) (Tanzania) (Uganda) 2027	To be determined								To be determined					
2028	To be determined								To be determined					
Total	Runners-up	3/35	11	3	5	3	12	13	90	30	16	47	106	116

=== Olympic Games ===
Olympic Games record
Appearances: 0
Year	Round	Position	Pld	W	D	L	GF	GA
1896 – 1948	Did not exist							
(Finland) 1952	Did not enter							
(Australia) 1956	Did not enter							
(Italy) 1960	Did not enter							
(Japan) 1964	Did not enter							
(Mexico) 1968	Did not qualify							
(West Germany) 1972	Did not enter							
(Canada) 1976	Did not qualify							
(Soviet Union) 1980	Withdrew during qualification							
(United States) 1984	Did not qualify							
(South Korea) 1988	Did not enter							
(Spain) 1992	Did not enter							
(United States) 1996	Did not enter							
(Australia) 2000	Did not enter							
(Greece) 2004	Did not qualify							
(China) 2008	Did not qualify							
(United Kingdom) 2012	Did not qualify							
(Brazil) 2016	Did not enter							
(Japan) 2020	Did not qualify							
(France) 2024	Did not qualify							
Total		0/28						

- Football at the Summer Olympics has been an under-23 tournament since the 1992 edition.

=== All-Africa Games ===
All-Africa Games record
Appearances: 1
Year	Round	Position	Pld	W	D	L	GF	GA
(Republic of the Congo) 1965	Did not enter							
(Nigeria) 1973	Did not enter							
(Algeria) 1978	Group stage ^{1}	8th	3	1	0	2	3	4
(Kenya) 1987	Did not enter							
(Egypt) 1991	Did not enter							
(Zimbabwe) 1995	Did not enter							
(South Africa) 1999	Did not enter							
(Nigeria) 2003	Did not qualify							
(Algeria) 2007	Did not qualify							
(Mozambique) 2011	Did not enter							
(Republic of the Congo) 2015	Did not enter							
(Morocco) 2019	To be determined							
(Ghana) 2023	To be determined							
Total	Group stage	1/11	3	1	0	2	3	4

- Prior to the Cairo 1991 campaign, the Football at the All-Africa Games was open to full senior national teams.
- ^1 Libya was disqualified from the tournament due to violence with the Egyptian team during the match in the group stage.

=== African Nations Championship ===
African Nations Championship record
Appearances: 4 (Note: Libya played against Tunisia at the 2020 African Nations Championship qualification, home and away, and Libya lost both matches 0–1 and 1–2. On 20 December 2019, the Tunisian Football Federation withdrew from the finals due to the pressure of the calendar after the approval of the clubs. On 31 January 2020, the Confederation of African Football (CAF) decided to replace Tunisia with Libya in the finals.)
Year	Round	Position	Pld	W	D	L	GF	GA
(Ivory Coast) 2009	Group stage	7th	3	0	2	1	1	3
(Sudan) 2011	Did not qualify							
(South Africa) 2014	Champions	1st	6	1	5	0	6	4
(Rwanda) 2016	Did not qualify							
(Morocco) 2018	Fourth place	4th	6	2	2	2	7	6
(Cameroon) 2020	Group stage	13th	3	0	2	1	1	2
(Algeria) 2022	Group stage	9th	3	1	0	2	1	2
(Kenya) (Tanzania) (Uganda) 2024	Withdrew							
Total	1 title	5/7	21	4	11	6	16	17

=== Mediterranean Games ===
Mediterranean Games record
Appearances: 9
Year	Round	Position	Pld	W	D	L	GF	GA
(Egypt) 1951	Did not enter							
(Spain) 1955	Did not enter							
(Lebanon) 1959	Did not enter							
(Italy) 1963	Did not enter							
(Tunisia) 1967	Group stage	8th	3	0	1	2	1	5
(Turkey) 1971	Did not enter							
(Algeria) 1975	Group stage	7th	4	1	0	3	4	8
(Socialist Federal Republic of Yugoslavia) 1979	Did not enter							
(Morocco) 1983	Group stage	9th	2	0	0	2	2	5
(Syria) 1987	Did not enter							
(Greece) 1991	Did not enter							
(France) 1993	Did not enter							
(Italy) 1997	Group stage	10th	3	0	2	1	3	4
(Tunisia) 2001	Group stage	7th	2	0	1	1	1	2
(Spain) 2005	Bronze medalists	3rd	5	1	2	2	3	10
(Italy) 2009	Bronze medalists	3rd	4	0	3	1	0	1
(Turkey) 2013	Fourth place	4th	5	1	1	3	6	12
(Spain) 2018	Group stage	9th	2	0	0	2	1	8
(Algeria) 2022	Did not enter							
Total	Bronze medalists	9/18	30	3	10	17	21	55

- Prior to the Athens 1991 campaign, the Football at the Mediterranean Games was open to full senior national teams.

=== FIFA Arab Cup ===
FIFA Arab Cup record
Appearances: 4
Year	Round	Position	Pld	W	D	L	GF	GA
(Lebanon) 1963	Did not enter							
(Kuwait) 1964	Runners-up	2nd	4	2	2	0	9	5
(Iraq) 1966	Third place	3rd	5	2	2	1	20	4
(Saudi Arabia) 1985	Did not enter							
(Jordan) 1988	Did not enter							
(Syria) 1992	Did not enter							
(Qatar) 1998	Group stage	11th	4	0	0	2	2	4
(Kuwait) 2002	Withdrew							
(Saudi Arabia) 2012	Runners-up	2nd	5	3	2	0	11	8
(Qatar) 2021	Did not qualify							
(Qatar) 2025	Did not qualify							
Total	Runners-up	4/9	18	7	6	3	42	21

=== Arab Games ===
Arab Games record
Appearances: 9
Year	Round	Position	Pld	W	D	L	GF	GA
(Egypt) 1953	Bronze medalists	3rd	3	2	0	1	10	14
(Lebanon) 1957	Group stage	8th	3	0	0	3	5	12
(Morocco) 1961	Bronze medalists	3rd	5	2	1	2	13	13
(United Arab Republic) 1965	Bronze medalists	3rd	6	4	0	2	44	18
(Syria) 1976	Did not enter							
(Morocco) 1985	Group stage	5th	2	1	0	1	2	2
(Syria) 1992	Did not enter							
(Lebanon) 1997	Group stage	6th	3	0	2	1	4	5
(Jordan) 1999	Bronze medalists	3rd	6	3	2	1	11	6
(Algeria) 2004	No tournament							
(Egypt) 2007	Silver medalists	2nd	4	3	1	0	7	1
(Qatar) 2011	Group stage	7th	3	0	2	1	1	2
Total	Silver medalists	9/11	35	15	8	12	97	73

== Honours ==
=== Continental ===
- Africa Cup of Nations
  - (silver) Runners-up (1): 1982
- African Nations Championship
  - (gold) Champions (1): 2014

=== Regional ===
- Arab Cup
  - (silver) Runners-up (2): 1964, 2012
  - (bronze) Third place (1): 1966
- Islamic Games
  - (gold) Gold medal (1): 1980

=== Friendly ===
- LG Cup (1): 2004

=== Summary ===
Competition	1st place, gold medalist(s)	2nd place, silver medalist(s)	3rd place, bronze medalist(s)	Total
CAF African Cup of Nations	0	1	0	1
CAF African Nations Championship	1	0	0	1
Total	1	1	0	2

== See also ==
- 1986 FIFA World Cup qualification (CAF) (The closest Libya came to qualifying for the World Cup).
