= Gatehouse Bank =

Islamic bank in the United Kingdom

Gatehouse Bank PLC
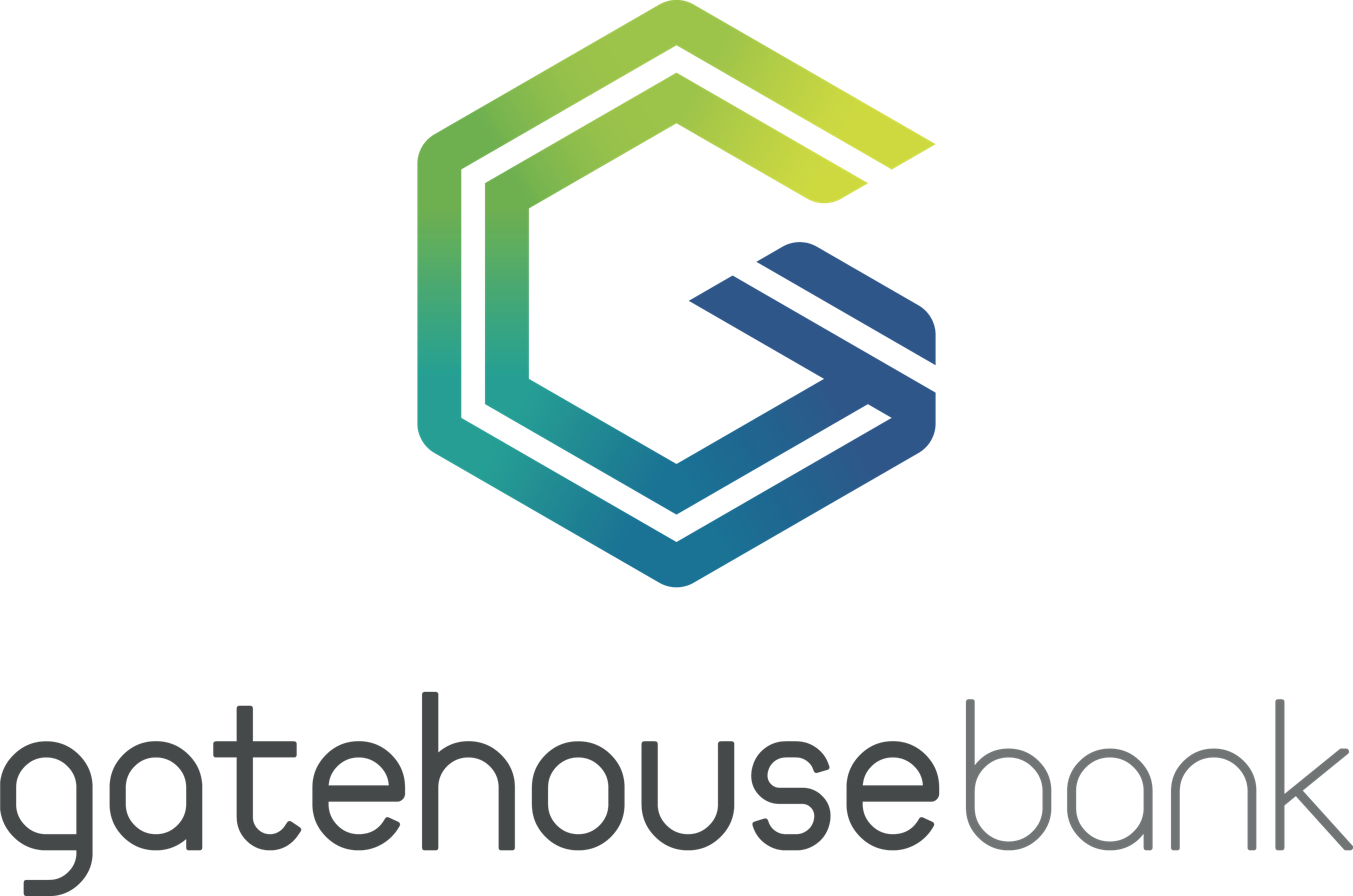
- Type: Public limited company
- Industry: Financial services
- Founded: 2007 (London)
- Headquarters: London, United Kingdom
- Area served: Worldwide
- Key people: Fahed Boodai (Chairman), Charles Haresnape (CEO)
- Products: Home finance, savings
- Number of employees: 183
- Website: www.gatehousebank.com

Gatehouse Bank PLC is a UK regulated Islamic bank headquartered in London, with additional offices in Birmingham, Milton Keynes and Wilmslow.

Gatehouse Bank was founded in 2007 and is a subsidiary of Gatehouse Financial Group. It offers savings products for UK customers and residential property finance in England and Wales for residents in the UK and overseas. Gatehouse Bank is authorised by the Prudential Regulation Authority (PRA) and regulated by the PRA and the Financial Conduct Authority (FCA).

Gatehouse Bank’s business and operations are conducted in accordance with the Shariah principles of transparent, fair, and socially responsible banking. This includes operating in a way which shares risk and reward equitably. No funds are invested in non-Shariah compliant industries such as arms, alcohol, tobacco, and adult entertainment. In 2019, Gatehouse Bank joined 129 founding members from around the world in becoming a founding signatory to the UN Principles for Responsible Banking.

== Leadership ==
- Fahed Boodai – Chairman
- Gerald Gregory – Deputy Chairman
- Abdulaziz Saud AlBader – Vice Chairman
- Lesley Beecher – Non-Executive Director
- Phillip McLelland - Non-Executive Director
- Charles Haresnape – Chief Executive Officer
- Danesh Mahadeva – Chief Financial Officer
- Dr Usman Chaudry – Chief Risk Officer
- Tracey Bailey – Chief Operating Officer
- Andy Homer – Chief Customer Officer
- Mohaimin Chowdhury – Chief Legal Officer
- Joanna Collings – Chief People Officer

== Products and services ==
Gatehouse Bank provides a range of property finance across England and Wales for UK residents, expats and international residents. The Bank’s home purchase plans offer a Shariah-compliant alternative to traditional mortgages. It also offers Buy-to-Let purchase plans, as a Shariah-compliant alternative for landlords.

Gatehouse Bank was an early entrant into the UK’s Build to Rent and Private Rented Sector (PRS) markets, establishing Gatehouse Living Group as a wholly owned subsidiary of the Bank, which comprised an investment arm, Gatehouse Investment Management and a property management arm, Ascend Estates Limited. In 2026, the Group was sold to US-based, asset management firm, Apollo Global Management, to support the Bank’s long-term growth strategy.

In 2021, Gatehouse launched its Woodland Saver Accounts (previously named ‘Green Saver’). For every account opened or renewed, the Bank plants a tree in a certified UK woodland project in partnership with Forest Carbon at no additional cost to the customer. The trees are planted across nine UK woodland projects certified by the government’s Woodland Carbon Code. In August 2026, the Bank announced that it had reached the milestone of planting 80,000 trees on behalf of its customers.

In 2022, Gatehouse Bank launched a range of green home finance products which offer a reduced rental rate for customers acquiring or refinancing a property with an energy efficiency rating of A or B. Additionally, the Bank offsets the carbon emissions generated by the average UK property for the product’s initial fixed term, at no additional cost to the customer.

In 2022, the Bank launched a mobile savings app available on iOS and Android, which can be used to open and manage an account.

== Recent strategy ==
In December 2024, Gatehouse Bank formed a partnership with ColCap Financial UK Limited which involved a forward flow arrangement to originate in excess of £550m of Shariah-compliant home finance. The partnership also entailed a sale of circa £109 million of the Bank’s beneficial interest in its existing home finance portfolio. This formed the first step in Gatehouse Bank’s strategy for long-term growth, which involves a series of planned back book sales from 2026 onwards, allowing for the recycling of capital held.

In August 2026, Gatehouse Bank completed a subsequent sale of the economic interest in a £405m Home Purchase Plan (HPP) portfolio to Waterfall Asset Management, which the bank cites as the largest Islamic home finance portfolio sale in the UK up to that point.

In 2026, Gatehouse Bank sold its Build to Rent subsidiary, Gatehouse Living Group (GLG) to global alternative asset manager, Apollo Global Management.At that point, Gatehouse Living Group had established five single-family residential platforms, successfully exited three, and acquired more than 5,000 homes from major UK housebuilders.

== Awards ==
- MoneyComms Award Winner 2026 – Best Ethical Cash ISA Provider
- Global Islamic Finance Award (GIFA) Winner 2025 – Best Islamic Bank for Green Savings and Financing
- European Excellence Awards 2025 – Public Affairs and Political Communications
- MoneyComms Award Winner 2025 – Best Green Savings Provider
- Moneynet Award Winner 2025 – Best Green Fixed Rate Savings Provider (Woodland Saver Accounts)
- International Business Magazine Awards 2025 – Most Trusted Islamic Bank UK
- International Business Magazine Awards 2025 – Leading Shariah-Compliant Bank UK
- Islamic Finance News’ (IFN) Best Banks Poll 2020, 2022 and 2024 – Best Islamic Bank in the United Kingdom
- MoneyComms Award Winner 2024 – Best Regular Savings Provider
- MoneyComms Award Winner 2024 – Best Ethical Cash ISA Provider
- Moneyfacts Award Winner 2024 – ISA Provider of the Year
- Corporate Vision Magazine ‘Corporate Excellence Awards’ 2024 – Best Shariah-Compliant Bank 2024 United Kingdom
