= Hashimi El-Bahlul =

Libyan footballer (1945-2024)

Personal information
- Full name: Hashimi El-Bahlul bin Hamed
- Date of birth: 1945
- Place of birth: Tripoli, Libya
- Date of death: 26 March 2024 (aged 78–79)
- Place of death: Tripoli, Libya
- Height: 1.75 m (5 ft 9 in)
- Position: Midfielder

Senior career*
Years	Team	Apps	(Gls)
1964–1976	Al Ahli Tripoli		

International career
1964–1976	Libya		

Managerial career
- Al Ahli Tripoli
- 1984–1986: Libya
- 1989: Al Ahli Tripoli
- 1994–1997: Libya
- * Club domestic league appearances and goals

Hashimi El-Bahlul bin Hamed (Arabic: الهاشمي البهلول; 1945 - 26 March 2024) was a Libyan football manager and footballer.

== Life and career ==
El-Bahlul was born in 1945 in Tripoli, Libya. He attended Ahmed Qanaba Elementary School in Libya. He mainly operated as a midfielder. He specifically operated as a defensive midfielder. He initially operated as a left-winger before switching to midfielder. He was nicknamed the "Kaizer of Libyan football". As a youth player, he joined the youth academy of Al Ahli Tripoli. He started his senior career with the club. He helped the club win the league. He was a Libya international. He was regarded as one of the team's most important players. He retired from playing football because of an injury.

El-Bahlul was appointed manager of Al Ahli Tripoli. He helped the club win the league. He helped them reach the final of the 1984 African Cup Winners' Cup. In 1984, he was appointed manager of the Libya national football team. He managed the team for 1986 FIFA World Cup qualification. In 1989, he returned as manager to Al Ahli Tripoli. In 1994, he returned as manager to the Libya national football team.

== Illness and death ==
He suffered a stroke in 2016. He died on 26 March 2024 in Tripoli, Libya.
