= Fahad Ensour =

Jordanian judge and politician (born 1934)

- فهد النسور

Minister of State of Legal Affairs
- In office 25 October 2004 – 5 April 2005

Jordan Constitutional Court Justice
- Incumbent
- Assumed office October 2012

Personal details
- Born: Fahad Abdul Karim Mofaddi Abu Al-Athem Ensour; 1934 (age 91–92) Salt, Emirate of Transjordan (present-day Jordan)
- Education: Damascus University

Fahad Ensour (Arabic: فهد النسور) was Jordan's Secretary of State for Legal Affairs.

He was born in Jordan in 1934. He obtained his law degree from the Syrian University/Damascus in 1959. Nsour served as attorney general and a judge in various courts. Between 1972–1974 to 1978 he worked as a legal adviser at the Cabinet. He chaired the Supreme Court of Jordan from 1988 to 1997.

In 2012, Ensour has been appointed as a Constitutional Court Justice in the Constitutional Court, which is considered the highest judicial body in Jordan.
