= Ghanima Al-Fahad =

Kuwaiti media personality

- Born: Kuwait, Kuwait
- Occupation: Singer
- Known for: Music & Politics in Kuwait
- Political party: SPLM

Ghanima Al-Fahad (Arabic: غنيمة الفهد) is a Kuwaiti media personality. She is known as a commentator on Kuwaiti heritage, and health matters and has appeared on TV cookery shows with traditional Kuwaiti recipes. She is often interviewed on disappearing Kuwaiti domestic traditions such as when interviewed by the Kuwait News Agency (KUNA) on traditional mother and daughter housekeeping games such as Baroue - a form of home-made doll house.
