= Fady =

Fady, Al Fady, or Fadey is an Arabic male given name meaning "redeemer, savior". Fady may refer to:

== People ==
- Fady Elsayed (born 1993), British actor
- Fady Joudah (born 1971), Palestinian-American poet and physician
- Fady Maalouf (born 1979), Lebanese-German pop singer
- Fadey Sargsyan (1923–2010), Armenian scientist and politician
- Faydee (born 1987), stage name of Fady Fatrouni, Australian singer and songwriter of Lebanese origin

== Other uses ==
- Fady (taboo), a taboo in Malagasy culture

== See also ==
- Fadi, a given name
