= Fadi Hammadeh =

Syrian autocross driver (born 1972)

Fadi Hammadeh (alternative Hamadeh) (born April 23, 1972) is a Syrian autocross driver.

== Career ==
Fadi Hammadeh won the Saudi autocross championship in 2003 and 2004. He also won the 2004-2005 International Syrian Hill-Climb and Speed Test championship. In 2004, he won the international Middle East championship (2004 front wheel), and was the record holder in the Jordanian hill climb in the N group.

Hammadeh won the 2008 Syrian Hill climb and Speed test championship, and came in second in the Middle East hill climb championship the same year.
