= Fahd Al-Mesmary =

Libyan footballer (born 2004)

Personal information
- Full name: Fahd Tarik Saad Mohamed
- Date of birth: 10 June 2004 (age 22)
- Place of birth: Libya
- Height: 1.81 m (5 ft 11 in)
- Positions: Striker; left wing

Senior career*
Years	Team	Apps	(Gls)
–2022	Al-Ahly SC		
2022–2023	FK Sutjeska Nikšić	14	(02)
2024–2025	Al Tahaddy SC		
2025–2026	Club Africain	29	(0)
- * Club domestic league appearances and goals

Fahd Tarik Saad Mohamed (Arabic: فهد المسماري; born 10 June 2004) is a Libyan footballer who plays as a striker for Libya national team.

== Early life ==
Al-Mesmary started his career with Libyan side Al-Ahly SC. He was promoted to the club's first team during the 2020/21 season.

== Career ==
Al-Mesmary has represented Libya internationally. He was first called up to the Libya national football team in 2023 for a match against the Equatorial Guinea national football team.

== Style of play ==
Al-Mesmary mainly operates as a striker. He has been described as having a "wide vision for the field... possesses a remarkable physical reserve".
