= Fahad, Khuzestan =

Fahad فهد
- Village
- Location within Iran
- Coordinates: 31°45′24″N 48°27′49″E
- Country: Iran
- Province: Khuzestan
- County: Shush
- Bakhsh: Shavur
- Rural District: Seyyed Abbas

Population (2006)
  - Total: 560
- Time zone: UTC+3:30 (IRST)
  - Summer (DST): UTC+4:30 (IRDT)

Fahad (Persian: فهد; also known as Beyt-e Ka‘b-e ‘Omar) is a village in Seyyed Abbas Rural District, Shavur District, Shush County, Khuzestan Province, Iran. At the 2006 census, its population was 560, in 99 families, and was named after King Fahd of Saudi Arabia.
