= Fadia Najeeb Thabet =

Yemeni post graduate student in America

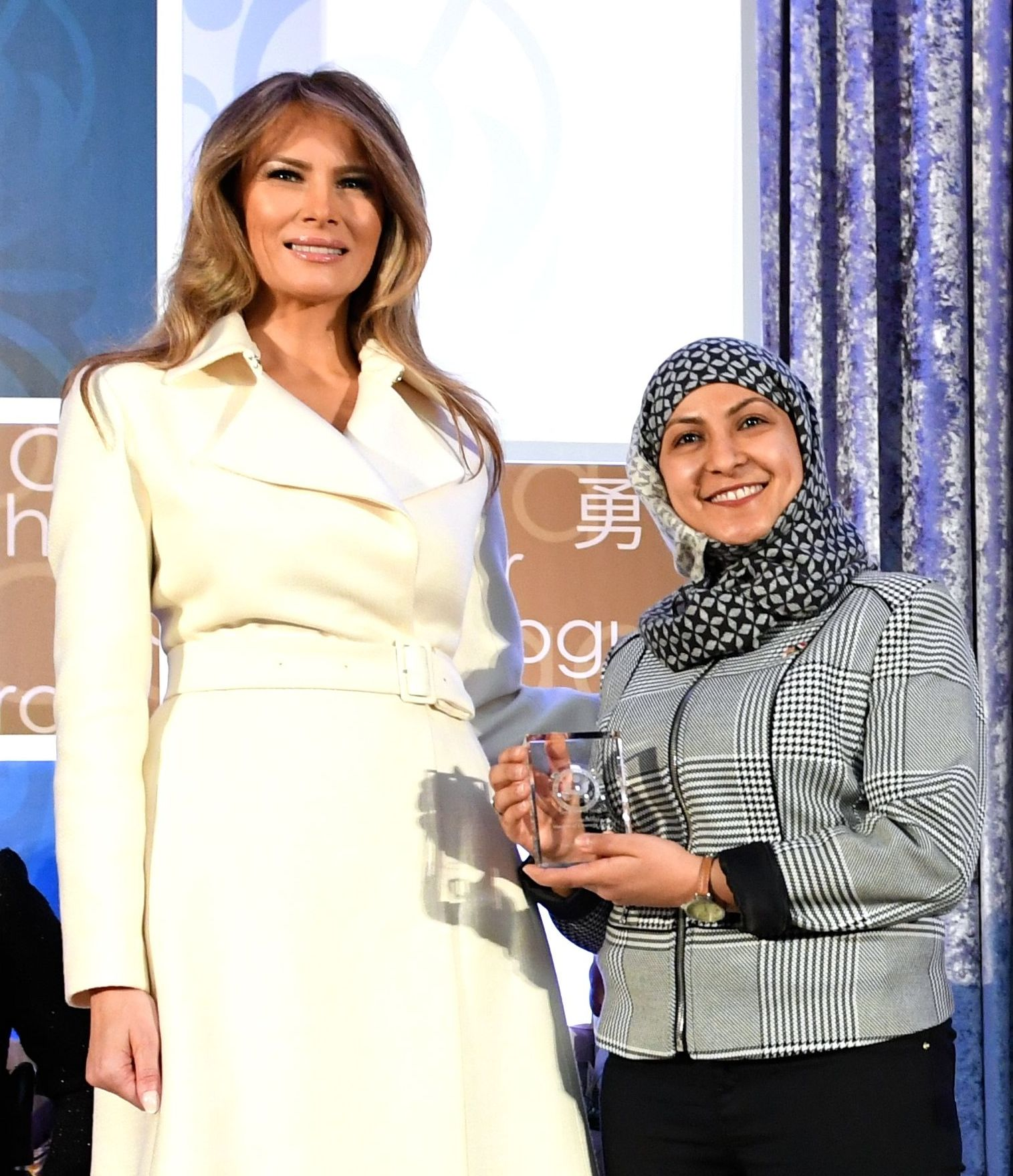
- Fadia Najeeb Thabet with Melania Trump at the International Women of Courage Award 2017
- Education: SIT Graduate Institute
- Known for: Human rights activist

Fadia Najeeb Thabet (Arabic: فادية نجيب ثابت) is a Yemeni post graduate student in America. In 2017 she was given an International Women of Courage Award for six years of work she did before 2016 as a child protection officer in Yemen.

== Life ==
For six years she was a child protection officer in Yemen. She was caring for traumatised children. She prevented boys from being recruited and radicalised. She helped prevent them from joining terrorists groups like the Houthis and Al-Qaeda and its local branch Ansar al Sharia and becoming child soldiers in the Yemeni civil war. She provided evidence to the United Nations of cases of human rights violations by various groups.

She moved to the United States in 2016 as a Hubert H. Humphrey Fellow. She decided to take a master's degree in Washington DC at the SIT Graduate Institute.

In March 2017 she became an International Women of Courage Award recipient.
