= Fahd El Bahja =

Italian footballer (born 1993)

Personal information
- Date of birth: 14 July 1993 (age 33)
- Place of birth: Sarzana, Italy
- Positions: Midfielder; winger; striker

Youth career
- Paris Saint-Germain

Senior career*
Years	Team	Apps	(Gls)
2012–2013	Noto		
2016	Lamarri		
2017	Maceratese	0	(0)
2017	Locarno		
2019	Marsala		
2019–2020	Alba		
2020	Marsala		
2022	Zimbru Chișinău	3	(0)
- * Club domestic league appearances and goals

Fahd El Bahja (Arabic: فهد البهجة; born 14 July 1993) is an Italian professional footballer who most recently played as a midfielder, winger, or striker for Zimbru Chișinău.

== Career ==
As a youth player, El Bahja joined the youth academy of Ligue 1 side Paris Saint-Germain. In 2012, he signed for Noto in the Italian fourth tier after receiving interest from Moroccan top flight club Wydad. In 2016, he signed for Lammari in the Italian fifth tier. Before the second half of 2016–17, El Bahja signed for Italian third tier team Maceratese.

In 2017, he signed for Locarno in the Swiss fifth tier. Before the second half of 2018–19, he signed for Italian fifth tier outfit Marsala. Before the second half of 2021–22, El Bahja signed for Zimbru Chișinău in the Moldovan top flight. On 18 March 2022, he debuted for Zimbru Chișinău in a 5–1 loss to Petrocub.
