= Fahed Boodai =

Kuwaiti entrepreneur

- فهد فيصل بودي
- Born: Fahed Faisal Boodai
- Education: University of San Diego; Loyola Marymount, MBA
- Occupation: Investment banker

Fahed Faisal Boodai (Arabic: فهد فيصل بودي) is a Kuwaiti entrepreneur. He is the chairman and co-founder of Gatehouse Financial Group and Gatehouse Bank.

== Education ==
Boodai received an MBA in Finance from the Loyola Marymount University in Los Angeles, and a bachelor's degree in International Business from the University of San Diego.

== War service ==
Iraq invaded Kuwait in 1990, when Boodai was 17. He joined the Kuwait armed forces in exile, and underwent basic training. Drawing on his fluency in English and Arabic, he went on to work with the US military as a translator.

Boodai was posted to military intelligence with the 18th Airborne Corps operating on the northern border of Saudi Arabia. After Kuwait was liberated by US-led coalition forces, he was given an officer rank and helped the US Army's host nation affairs unit foster relations with the Kuwaiti population.

Boodai was awarded the US Army Commendation Medal for meritorious service to the US Army during Operation Desert Storm and the liberation of Kuwait.

== Career ==
Boodai began his career as deputy manager – International Division of the Securities House, a publicly traded investment firm on the Kuwait stock exchange. He held several roles over the years, working his way up to vice chairman and chief executive, which he held until June 2023.

During his tenure, Boodai founded a US partner firm for Securities House, Global Securities House Ltd, where he developed Shariah-compliant screening tools and managed equity portfolios for Gulf investors.

In 2002, Boodai founded Gatehouse Capital KSCC, a Kuwaiti investment firm, where he led strategic investments in student housing, single family rentals in the US and UK and over US$1.25 billion in US Light Industrial with Brennan Investment Group. Boodai served as Chairman of the organisation from 2016 until June 2023.

=== Gatehouse Bank ===
In 2007, Boodai co-founded Gatehouse Bank, where he led its restructuring and repositioning into real estate and wealth management in 2011, as well as subsequent restructuring into a digital challenger bank in 2017. Under Boodai's leadership, Gatehouse raised its paid-up capital and secured investments from a sovereign wealth fund.

Boodai is viewed as a pioneering force in the UK's Build to Rent sector, and, under his stewardship, Gatehouse Bank was an early entrant into the UK's Build to Rent and Private Rented Sector (PRS) markets.

Gatehouse Bank’s first major venture, Project Thistle, delivered 918 newly built family rental homes across Greater Manchester and Liverpool between 2014 and 2017. The portfolio was sold to Goldman Sachs in 2021 for approximately £150m, marking a landmark transaction for the sector.

The Bank subsequently expanded its activities through major institutional partnerships, including a £500m joint venture with TPG Real Estate Partners and further partnerships with Carlyle and Greykite. In 2023, Gatehouse Living Group was established as a wholly owned subsidiary of Gatehouse Bank, which comprised an investment arm, Gatehouse Investment Management (GIM) and a property management arm, Ascend Estates Limited.

In 2026, the Group was sold to US-based, asset management firm, Apollo Global Management, to support the long-term growth strategy of Gatehouse Bank.

In December 2024, Gatehouse Bank formed a partnership with ColCap Financial UK Limited, a UK subsidiary of ColCap Financial Group, which is a leading Australian non-bank lender.

The partnership involved a forward flow arrangement to originate in excess of £550m of Shariah-compliant home finance and a sale of circa £109m of the Bank’s beneficial interest in its existing home finance portfolio. This formed the first step of Gatehouse Bank’s strategy for long-term growth, which includes a series of planned back book sales from 2026 onwards, allowing for the recycling of capital held.

In 2026, Gatehouse Bank completed the sale of its economic interest in a £405 million Home Purchase Plan (HPP) portfolio to Waterfall Asset Management, marking the largest Islamic home finance portfolio sale in the UK to date.

== Awards and recognition ==
In October 2011, Boodai was recognised as one of the top 40 under 40 up-and-coming real estate superstars by Real Estate Forum.

Boodai was presented with the Award for Business at the first Arabian Business London Awards in 2019.

== Personal life ==
Boodai is married to Sheikha Al-Zain Sabah Al-Naser Al-Sabah, who assumed office as the ambassador of Kuwait to the United States in March 2023. The couple have three children.
