= Fadia gens =

Plebeian family of ancient Rome

The gens Fadia was a plebeian family at Rome. Members of this gens are first mentioned around the time of Cicero, but they did not obtain any of the higher offices of the Roman state under the Republic. Their fortunes improved under the Empire, and two of the Fadii held consulships during the second century.

== Origin ==
The nomen Fadius seems to be one of several names derived from the cognomen Fadus. They were not of Roman origin; The Fadii mentioned by Cicero were natives of Arpinum, in the southern part of Latium, and thus his fellow townsmen. Some of them evidently migrated to Rome, where they traveled in distinguished circles, although they obtained only minor fame.

== Praenomina ==
The Fadii Galli are known to have used the praenomina Titus, Marcus, and Quintus, all of which were amongst the most common names throughout Roman history. The other Fadii also bore common praenomina, including Gaius, Sextus, and Lucius.

== Branches and cognomina ==
The only family of this gens mentioned under the Republic bore the cognomen Gallus, a common surname that typically signified a cockerel, but could also refer to a Gaul, perhaps alluding to an ancestor who fought against the Gauls, or in some manner resembled them. The two consuls of the second century bore the surname Rufus, "red" or "reddish", and its diminutive, Rufinus, suggesting that they too may have belonged to a distinct family. Celer, the cognomen of a first-century Roman governor, means "swift". A number of Fadii are mentioned without any cognomen.

== Members ==
This list includes abbreviated praenomina. For an explanation of this practice, see filiation.

=== Fadii Galli ===
- Titus Fadius Gallus, quaestor of Cicero during his consulship in BC 63. He was tribune of the plebs in 57, and endeavoured to bring about Cicero's recall from exile. Fadius himself seems to have been exiled at a later time, during which Cicero wrote his friend concerning his misfortune.
- Marcus Fadius Gallus, (Note: Erroneously called "Fabius" in some editions of Cicero.) a close friend of Cicero and Atticus, was one of Caesar's supporters during the Civil War. In 49 BC, he was one of Caesar's legates in Spain.
- Quintus Fadius Gallus, a brother of Marcus, with whom he was engaged in a dispute in 46 BC. Cicero, who recommended Marcus to Paetus, regarded his brother Quintus as a homo non sapiens.
- Fadia Q. f., the daughter of Quintus Fadius Gallus, had her inheritance stolen through the fraudulent machinations of Publius Sextilius Rufus.

=== Others ===
- Gaius or Quintus Fadius, the father-in-law of Mark Antony, was a very wealthy freedman.
- Fadia, the first wife of the triumvir Mark Antony, to whom she bore several children.
- Sextus Fadius, mentioned by Cicero as one of the physician Nicon's disciples.
- Lucius Fadius, one of the aediles at Arpinum in 44 BC.
- Marcus Fadius Celer Flavianus Maximus, the first governor of Mauretania Tingitana, from AD 43 to 48.
- Lucius Fadius Rufinus, consul suffectus in AD 113, he served from the Kalends of May to the Kalends of September.
- Gaius Fadius Rufus, consul suffectus in AD 145, serving from the Kalends of November to the end of the year.

== See also ==
- List of Roman gentes

== Bibliography ==
=== Ancient sources ===
- Marcus Tullius Cicero, De Finibus Bonorum et Malorum, Epistulae ad Atticum, Epistulae ad Familiares, Epistulae ad Quintum Fratrem, Philippicae, Post Reditum in Senatu.

=== Modern sources ===
- Cassell's Latin and English Dictionary, D.P. Simpson, ed., Macmillan Publishing Company, New York (1963).
- George Davis Chase, "The Origin of Roman Praenomina", in Harvard Studies in Classical Philology, vol. VIII, pp. 103–184 (1897).
- Dictionary of Greek and Roman Biography and Mythology, William Smith, ed., Little, Brown and Company, Boston (1849).
- Theodor Mommsen et alii, Corpus Inscriptionum Latinarum (The Body of Latin Inscriptions, abbreviated CIL), Berlin-Brandenburgische Akademie der Wissenschaften (1853–present).
- J. E. H. Spaul, "Governors of Tingitana", in Antiquités Africaines, vol. XXX, No. 1 (1994), pp. 235–260.
