= Fahda (name) =

Fahda is an Arabic feminine given name. Notable people with the name include:

- Fahda bint Falah Al Hithlain, Saudi royal and third wife of King Salman
- Fahda bint Saud Al Saud (born 1953), Saudi royal and daughter of King Saud
- Fahda bint Asi Al Shuraim (died 1934), Arabian royal woman, mother of former Saudi King Abdullah

== See also ==
- Fahd (disambiguation)
