= Fahd Gomaa =

Egyptian footballer (born 1999)

Personal information
- Date of birth: 11 January 1999 (age 27)
- Height: 1.83 m (6 ft 0 in)
- Position: Forward

Team information
- Current team: Amer Village

Youth career
- 2009–2021: Al Ahly

Senior career*
| Years | Team | Apps | (Gls) |
| 2021–2023 | Al Ahly | 0 | (0) |
| 2021–2023 | → Smouha (loan) | 12 | (0) |
| 2023 | → El Dakhleya (loan) | 7 | (0) |
| 2023–2024 | Asyut Petroleum | | |
| 2024–2025 | Kahraba Ismailia | | |
| 2025 | → Tanta (loan) | | |
| 2025– | Amer Village | | |
- * Club domestic league appearances and goals as of 23:14, 2 March 2026 (UTC)

Fahd Gomaa (Arabic: فهد جمعة; born 11 January 1999) is an Egyptian professional footballer who plays as a forward for Amer Village.

== Club career ==
Gomaa joined the academy of Al Ahly in 2009, progressing through the youth ranks before making his debut in a friendly match against Misr Insurance. Following the 2–2 draw, in which Gomaa notched an assist, he was described by Al Ahly technical director, Amr Anwar, as a "promising striker", lauding his speed and strength.

In August 2021, as part of Al Ahly's deal to sign Hossam Hassan from Smouha, Gomaa was loaned to the Alexandria-based club, alongside teammate Beckham. Though he signed a two-year loan deal, after just one season Gomaa requested to be recalled by Al Ahly, citing a lack of playing time. Despite speaking to Btolat in January 2023 to dispel rumours of his unhappiness, claiming he was receiving good treatment from staff, Gomaa failed to feature again for Smouha, with his final appearance coming as a last-minute substitute against Haras El Hodoud on 1 November 2022.

In January 2023, Gomaa was recalled by Al Ahly, and the club entered negotiations with fellow Egyptian Premier League club El Dakhleya to arrange a loan deal. This move was confirmed on 31 January 2023, with Gomaa signing a 6-month loan deal. After seven appearances for El Dakhleya, Gomaa was released by Al Ahly in July 2023. He would later state in an interview with Egyptian media that he believed the decision to leave Al Ahly on loan had been a mistake.

In September 2023 he agreed a deal with Egyptian Second Division club Asyut Petroleum, signing a three-year contract. Despite this, the following year he was playing for Kahraba Ismailia, before a loan move was agreed in January 2025 with Tanta.

== Personal life ==
Gomaa's uncle is former professional footballer, and Egypt international, Mohamed Ramadan, and it was Ramadan who encouraged Gomaa to begin playing football.

== Career statistics ==
=== Club ===
Appearances and goals by club, season and competition
| Club | Season | League | | | National Cup | | League Cup | | Other | | Total | |
| Club | Season | Division | Apps | Goals | Apps | Goals | Apps | Goals | Apps | Goals | Apps | Goals |
|---|---|---|---|---|---|---|---|---|---|---|---|---|
| Al Ahly | 2021–22 | Egyptian Premier League | 0 | 0 | 0 | 0 | 0 | 0 | 0 | 0 | 0 | 0 |
| Al Ahly | 2022–23 | Egyptian Premier League | 0 | 0 | 0 | 0 | 0 | 0 | 0 | 0 | 0 | 0 |
| Al Ahly | Total | | 0 | 0 | 0 | 0 | 0 | 0 | 0 | 0 | 0 | 0 |
| Smouha (loan) | 2021–22 | Egyptian Premier League | 11 | 0 | 1 | 0 | 1 | 0 | 0 | 0 | 13 | 0 |
| Smouha (loan) | 2022–23 | Egyptian Premier League | 1 | 0 | 0 | 0 | 0 | 0 | 0 | 0 | 1 | 0 |
| Smouha (loan) | Total | | 12 | 0 | 1 | 0 | 1 | 0 | 0 | 0 | 14 | 0 |
| El Dakhleya (loan) | 2022–23 | Egyptian Premier League | 7 | 0 | 0 | 0 | 0 | 0 | 0 | 0 | 7 | 0 |
| Career total | | | 19 | 0 | 1 | 0 | 1 | 0 | 0 | 0 | 21 | 0 |
